= Stort Navigation =

Canalised river in Hertfordshire, England

Coordinates: 51°46′57.23″N 0°5′47.88″E

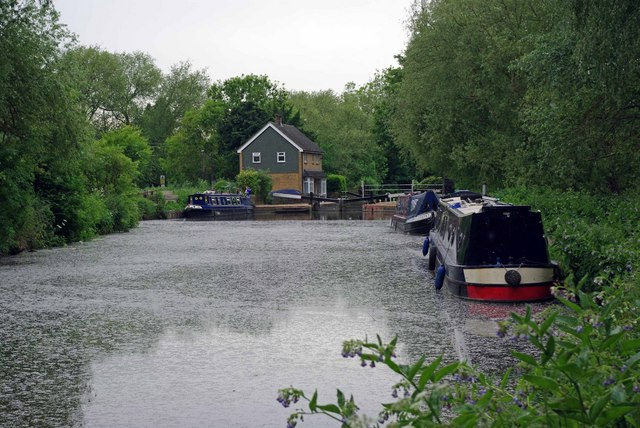
- The navigation approaching Roydon lock
- Interactive map of Stort Navigation

Specifications
- Length: 13.75 miles (22.13 km)
- Maximum boat length: 86 ft 0 in (26.21 m)
- Maximum boat beam: 13 ft 3 in (4.04 m)
- Locks: 15
- Status: navigable
- Navigation authority: Canal and River Trust

History
- Principal engineer: Thomas Yeoman
- Date of act: 30 March 1766
- Date completed: 1769

Geography
- Connects to: Lee Navigation

The Stort Navigation is the canalised section of the River Stort running 22 kilometres (14 mi) from the town of Bishop's Stortford, Hertfordshire, downstream to its confluence with the Lee Navigation at Feildes Weir near Rye House, Hoddesdon, Hertfordshire.

== History ==
Stort Navigation Act 1758
- Act of Parliament
- Parliament of Great Britain
- Long title: An Act for making the River Stort navigable, in the Counties of Hertford and Essex, from the new Bridge in the Town of Bishop Stortford, into the River Lee, near a Place called The Rye, in the County of Hertford.
- Citation: 32 Geo. 2. c. 42
- Territorial extent: Great Britain

Dates
- Royal assent: 23 March 1759
- Commencement: 23 November 1758 (Note: Start of session.)
Other legislation
| Relates to | Stort Navigation Act 1766; Lee Conservancy Act 1868 |

Status: Current legislation

Text of statute as originally enacted

With the growth of the malt trade in Bishop's Stortford in the early eighteenth century, attention turned to providing better transport facilities. The River Stort joined the River Lea, and the malt trade at Ware had benefitted from improvements made on that river. A similar solution was therefore sought for the Stort, and a public meeting was held on 11 December 1758. The chief promoter seems to have been Thomas Adderley. A bill was duly submitted to Parliament, and became an act of Parliament, the Stort Navigation Act 1758 (32 Geo. 2. c. 42) in March 1759. It was entitled An Act for making the River Stort navigable, in the counties of Hertford and Essex, from the New Bridge, in the town of Bishop Stortford, into the River Lea, near a Place called the Rye, in the county of Hertford. Commissioners were appointed to oversee the work and to raise the capital to fund the project. They failed in this duty, and the powers of the first act lapsed, as it imposed time limits during which the work had to be completed.

Stort Navigation Act 1766
- Act of Parliament
- Parliament of Great Britain
- Long title: An Act for making and continuing navigable the River Stort, in the Counties of Hertford and Essex.
- Citation: 6 Geo. 3. c. 78
- Territorial extent: Great Britain

Dates
- Royal assent: 30 April 1766
- Commencement: 17 December 1765
Other legislation
| Relates to | Stort Navigation Act 1758; Lee Conservancy Act 1868 |

Status: Current legislation

Text of statute as originally enacted

A second act of Parliament was sought after three men proposed to the commissioners that they would fund the scheme in return for the tolls. This met with the commissioners' approval, and the Stort Navigation Act 1766 (6 Geo. 3. c. 78) was obtained on 30 March 1766. It was entitled An Act for making and continuing navigable the River Stort, in the counties of Hertford and Essex, and it empowered Charles Dingley, George Jackson and William Masterson to build the Navigation and to collect tolls. They had five years to complete the work, and the powers of the first act were repealed by the second. Work began on 24 September, under the direction of Thomas Yeoman, who was also the surveyor for the Lee Navigation, and was completed in autumn 1769. The navigation, which included fifteen locks, was officially opened on 24 October 1769.

In 1796, Jackson issued a Stort halfpenny token for use on the navigation. The reverse shows the course of the river with a horse-drawn barge in the foreground. It was struck by Matthew Boulton in mid-1796, despite the date on the piece (1795). Conrad Heinrich Küchler was the designer.

Because the navigation was privately funded, there is no record of the actual cost, but Jackson, speaking in 1812 and by then named Sir George Duckett, stated that it had not been a good business proposition. The Lee Navigation paid the proprietors £105 in 1774, for improvements made to the junction between the two rivers. Trade increased gradually, rising from around 18,000 or 19,000 tons in 1791 to 40,000 tons in 1811.

=== Table of tolls ===
The tolls specified by the enabling act of Parliament were as follows.

Tonnage rates
| For wheat, rye, beans or peas | 0s 6d per quarter. (£0.025) |
| For malt or oats | 0s 4d ditto. (£0.016) |
| For barley, or any other sort of grain not before enumerated | 0s 5d ditto. (£0.024) |
| For meal or flour (five bushels to a sack) | 0s 4d per sack. (£0.016) |
| For coal, culm or cinders | 2s 6d per chaldron (£0.13/m³) |
| For lime | 2s 6d ditto (£0.13/m³) (£0.125) |
| For oil-cakes, malt-dust, pigeon dung or other manure of any Kind | 1s 6d per ton (£0.075) |
| For goods, wares or merchandise not before enumerated | 2s 6d ditto. (£0.125) |

And so in proportion for any less Quantity.

Boats returning with a back lading of Oil-cake, Malt-dust, Pigeon Dung or any other Kind of Manure, which have passed up or down the River immediately before, and paid the Tolls or Rates on their Cargoes, shall be exempted from Tonnage Rate on such Manure.

=== Development ===
Once the Stort was navigable to Bishop's Stortford, there was interest in making it part of a larger network. The City of London's Thames and Canal Committee appointed the engineer Robert Whitworth to survey a route for a canal between Bishop's Stortford and Cambridge. He was to produce a report, including an estimate of the cost of construction, and give his opinion on whether any other route to Cambridge might be better. Although he was asked to do this in November 1779, it was more than a year until he produced the report, which was published on 6 December 1780. His plan followed the obvious route, passing up the Stort valley, and crossing into the Granta valley to reach Cambridge. However, this involved passing in front of Audley End, the home of Lord Howard de Walden, who vehemently opposed the scheme. A public meeting held in November 1781 ended in disarray, and no further action was taken at the time.

John Phillips was next to revive the plan in 1785, although it was a small part of a grand scheme to link London to Kings Lynn. He hoped to avoid the opposition experienced previously by routing his Bishop's Stortford to Cambridge link to the west of the Shotgrove and Audley End estates. He did not find favour because his costings were thought to be wildly optimistic. George Jackson proposed a route to the Thames and Canal Committee in 1788, which passed behind Audley End and through Saffron Walden. This was surveyed by Samuel Weston, as Whitworth was busy in Scotland. Lord Howard opposed this route, too, as did the Bedford Level Corporation. In 1789, a line proposed by John Rennie was considered, which would have passed through Saffron Walden to join the River Little Ouse near Wilton Ferry. A bill was presented to Parliament, but was withdrawn in the face of serious opposition.

London and Cambridge Junction Canal Act 1812
- Act of Parliament
- Parliament of the United Kingdom
- Long title: An Act for making and maintaining a navigable Canal with Aqueducts, Feeders, and Reservoirs, from the Stort Navigation at or near Bishop's Stortford, in the County of Hertford to join the River Cam near Clayhithe Sluice, in the County of Cambridge, with a navigable Branch or Cut from the said Canal at Sawston to Whaddon, in the County of Cambridge.
- Citation: 52 Geo. 3. c. cxli
- Territorial extent: United Kingdom

Dates
- Royal assent: 9 June 1812
- Commencement: 9 June 1812 (Note: The Acts of Parliament (Commencement) Act 1793.)
Other legislation
| Amended by | London and Cambridge Junction Canal Act 1814 |

Status: Amended

Text of statute as originally enacted

London and Cambridge Junction Canal Act 1814
- Act of Parliament
- Parliament of the United Kingdom
- Long title: An Act to alter and amend an Act made in the Fifty second Year of His present Majesty, for making a Canal from the Stort Navigation, at or near Bishops Stortford, to the River Cam.
- Citation: 54 Geo. 3. c. clxviii
- Territorial extent: United Kingdom

Dates
- Royal assent: 20 June 1814
- Commencement: 20 June 1814
Other legislation
| Amends | London and Cambridge Junction Canal Act 1812 |

Status: Current legislation

Text of statute as originally enacted

The next attempt was made in 1811, with Jackson, now called Sir George Duckett, driving the plan. A bill was introduced to Parliament, but was defeated in committee. A second bill was introduced in January 1812, with some modifications, and despite organised opposition, became an act of Parliament, the London and Cambridge Junction Canal Act 1812 (52 Geo. 3. c. cxli) on 9 June 1812. It authorised the raising of £870,000 for the project, which included 52 locks on the main line, 13 on a branch to Whaddon, and three tunnels. Work could not be started until £425,250 had been raised. However, only £121,300 was subscribed, and so a second act, the London and Cambridge Junction Canal Act 1814 (54 Geo. 3. c. clxviii) was obtained, to authorise just the sections from the River Cam to Saffron Walden, and the branch to Whaddon. Despite the authorisation, no work was ever done, and the idea of the London and Cambridge Junction Canal faded away.

=== Operation ===
A change of ownership occurred in 1832, when the bankers Duckett, Morland and Company failed, and Sir George Duckett, the son of one of the original three funders, became bankrupt. At the time, the annual income from tolls was around £5,000, and the whole concern was estimated to be worth £150,000. It passed to a firm called Birbecks, who had loaned the company £40,000 but then foreclosed the mortgage. They then passed it on to Gurney and Co., who were bankers based in Norwich.

In May 1842 the Northern and Eastern Railway opened a line to Bishop's Stortford, which followed the valley of the Stort, and had stations almost on the banks of the navigation. The effect on trade was dramatic, with income dropping from £5,477 to £2,593 in the ten years between 1838 and 1848. The decline then stopped, and the Lee Navigation gave serious thought to purchasing their neighbour. Two acts of Parliament, the Lee Conservancy Act 1868 (31 & 32 Vict. c. cliv) and the Lee Conservancy Act 1874 (37 & 38 Vict. c. xcvi), obtained by them included powers to authorise the acquisition, but surveys were made, and the amount of repairs and dredging that would be required persuaded them to only offer a small sum, which was rejected. Gurney and Co. sold it in 1873 to a firm of brewers from Spitalfields called Truman, Hanbury and Co. Sir Walter Gilbey took it over next, and formed the Stort Navigation Company Ltd in 1905, a company in which most of the directors were members of his own family.

With income dropping, Gilbey began negotiating with the Lee Navigation. Bishop's Stortford Urban District Council offered £170 towards its purchase, on condition that other local authorities should also contribute. Later that year, one side of Brick Lock at Roydon collapsed. As it was the second lock above the junction with the Lee, nearly all the barges that operated on the Navigation were trapped above it. Gilbey offered the Navigation to the Lee Navigation for a small fee. Although the deal was not finalised, they sent extra men to assist the six already employed on rebuilding the lock, and it reopened on 4 October 1909. Another assessment by the Lee Conservancy Board estimated that £10,800 was needed to put it back into good order, and noted that income had dropped from £927 to £319 between 1901 and 1907. Eventually Gilbey gave in, and the Lee Conservancy Board took ownership on 1 June 1911, having paid just five shillings (25p) for it.

Prior to the takeover, the Lee Conservators had applied for a loan under the Development and Road Improvement Funds Act 1909 (9 Edw. 7. c. 47), and were granted five annual payments of £2,500, to be repaid when profits were made. Work began on rebuilding the locks in 1913, but the onset of the First World War in 1914 resulted in all work stopping, except for urgent repairs. It resumed when the war ended, and the navigation was reopened on 4 July 1924, the ceremony being performed by Harry Gosling, the Minister of Transport. Some traffic returned to the navigation, as trade in timber, grain and malt grew, but it died away after the Second World War, and the last commercial traffic was in 1972. However, the growth in leisure boating was already well under way, and the navigation has seen a new lease of life as a result.

== Present day ==
The 15 locks (see table) are built to take boats 86 feet (26 m) by 13.25 feet (4.0 m), which means that they are not quite wide enough to take two narrow boats at a time. The Navigation is now managed by the Canal & River Trust as successor to British Waterways.

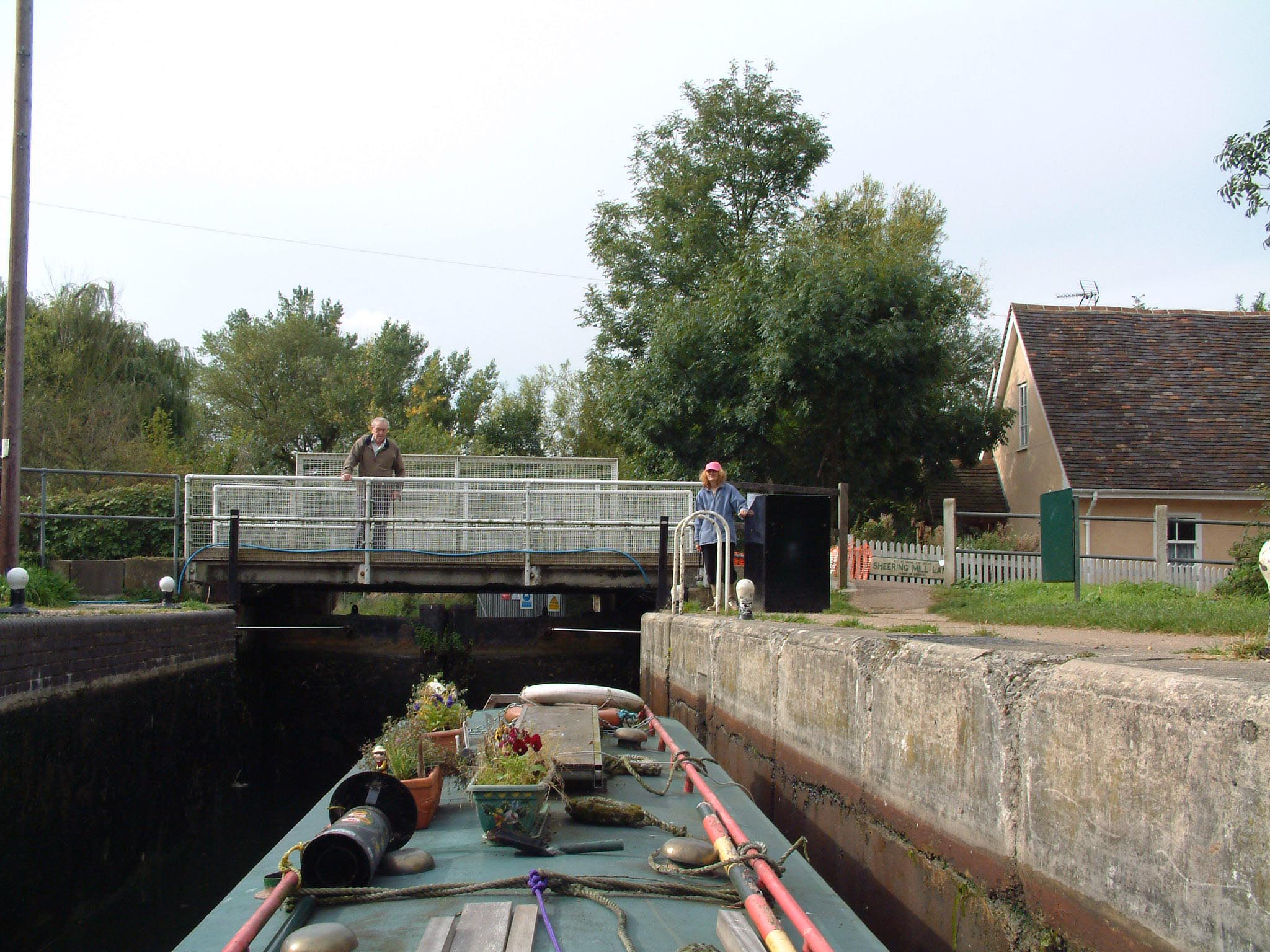
Sheering Mill lock

Locks on the Stort Navigation
| Lock name | Lock number | Change in level | Distance from Feilde's Weir |
|---|---|---|---|
| South Mill Lock | 1 | 5 ft 5 in (1.65 m) | 12.5 mi (20.1 km) |
| Twyford Lock | 2 | 7 ft 0 in (2.13 m) | 12.0 mi (19.3 km) |
| Spellbrook Lock | 3 | 5 ft 0 in (1.52 m) | 10.8 mi (17.4 km) |
| Tednambury Lock | 4 | 5 ft 9 in (1.75 m) | 10.0 mi (16.1 km) |
| Sawbridgeworth Lock | 5 | 7 ft 5 in (2.26 m) | 8.9 mi (14.3 km) |
| Sheering Mill Lock | 6 | 5 ft 8 in (1.73 m) | 8.4 mi (13.5 km) |
| Feakes Lock | 7 | 6 ft 0 in (1.83 m) | 7.75 mi (12.47 km) |
| Harlow Mill Lock | 8 | 8 ft 9 in (2.67 m) | 6.75 mi (10.86 km) |
| Latton Lock | 9 | 6 ft 0 in (1.83 m) | 5.4 mi (8.7 km) |
| Burnt Mill Lock | 10 | 3 ft 7 in (1.09 m) | 4.5 mi (7.2 km) |
| Pardon Mill Lock | 11 | 7 ft 0 in (2.13 m) | 3.5 mi (5.6 km) |
| Hunsdon Mill Lock | 12 | 7 ft 0 in (2.13 m) | 2.5 mi (4.0 km) |
| Roydon Lock | 13 | 6 ft 0 in (1.83 m) | 1.5 mi (2.4 km) |
| Brick Lock | 14 | 6 ft 3 in (1.91 m) | 0.8 mi (1.3 km) |
| Lower Lock | 15 | 3 ft 9 in (1.14 m) | 0.3 mi (0.48 km) |

There is a towpath along the entire length of the navigation, which forms part of a number of long-distance walks. The Stort Valley Way is a 28-mile (45 km) circular walk, while the Three Forests Way is a 60-mile (97 km) circular walk, passing through Hatfield Forest, Hainault Forest and Epping Forest. It was devised by the West Essex Group of the Ramblers Association, as a way to commemorate the Silver Jubilee of Elizabeth II.

== Route ==
The navigation begins in Bishop's Stortford, just to the south of the A1250 Hockerill Bridge. It receives its water supply from the upper River Stort, which rises as a series of streams near Langley, some 11 miles (18 km) to the north. Nearby and to the east is Bishop's Stortford railway station, on the London Liverpool Street to Kings Lynn line. Both bear south, and the railway crosses to the west bank. South Mill lock marks the start of the descent, and beyond it are watermeadows and Rushy Mead Nature Reserve, an 11.5-acre (4.7 ha) site run by Essex Wildlife Trust which was the location of a sewage pumping station prior to 1950. After Twyford Lock, it passes below Wallbury Camp, on the east bank. This is an iron-age hill fort, and is a scheduled ancient monument. Spellbrook Lock and Tadnambury Lock follow shortly afterwards. The river flows around Tadnambury Lock in a large loop, on which Hallingbury Mill is located. It was built in 1874, and there is a granary built on the site of the original mill which was demolished in 1885. The breast-shot waterwheel is 7 feet (2.1 m) wide and 16 feet (4.9 m) in diameter. The Grade II* listed mill was restored in the late 1960s, and is now a hotel and bistro. The railway crosses back to the east bank, as the navigation enters Sawbridgeworth.

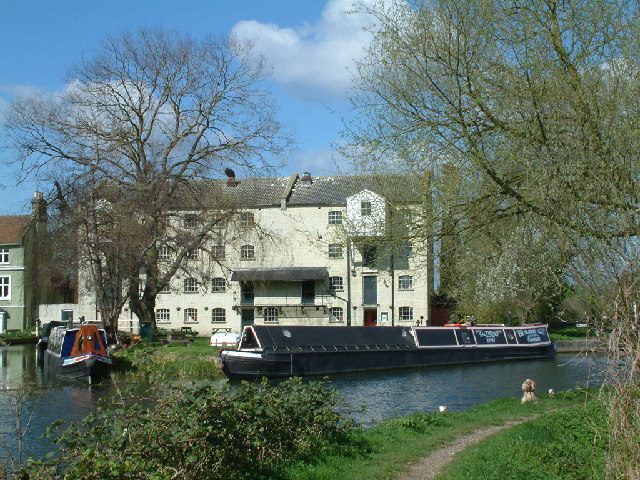
Parndon Mill dates from the 19th century, and used both water and steam power.

Sawbridgeworth Lock is located on the northern edge of the town, where both the timber-framed and weatherboarded mill house, and the nearby grain store, date from the 18th century and are Grade II listed. Sheering Mill Lock is to the east, where the navigation is sandwiched between the village of Lower Sheering and the town. The mill house here dates from the 17th century, and is timber framed with exterior plasterwork. It was extended in the 19th and 20th centuries, and contains reproduction features, which make the historical evidence more difficult to decipher. Below Sawbridgeworth is Feakes Lock, where the navigation turns towards the south-west. As it does so, it forms the eastern edge of the Pishiobury Estate, a country house and landscaped park containing gardens from the 16th century and later. The Grade II listed grounds include formal canals, and the landscaping is attributed to Capability Brown.

On the northern edge of Harlow, it passes under the A1184 road, which is immediately followed by Harlow Lock. The adjacent mill probably dates from the 17th century, but gives few clues to its age. It is now a restaurant. The railway separates the navigation from the town. There are no significant buildings at Latton Lock or Burnt Mill Lock, but there is a mill building at Parndon Lock, dating from the mid- or late-19th century. It used both water power and steam power, although none of the machinery survives except a water turbine. The mill house is somewhat older, dating from the mid-18th century, and is a three-storey brick building, the front of which is rendered.

Near Hunston Mill Lock is the brick base of a watermill, which was demolished in 1902, and a brick bridge with abutments. There was a mill on the site in 1066. Some 19th century cast-iron sluices still control water flow through the site. The adjacent mill house with its stables, coach house and walls are all Grade II listed. The house dates from the 17th century, although it was faced with brick and extended in the 19th century, and extended again in 1912. To the west is Briggens, an 18th-century house with landscaped gardens designed by Charles Bridgeman around 1720, which also has some Edwardian pleasure gardens. The house is now a hotel, and there is a golf course in part of the gardens, although most of the 18th century landscape features have been retained.

Just after Roydon Lock, the railway crosses from the south bank to the north on a low bridge. Roydon railway station is very close to the navigation, although its attractive timber-framed and plastered buildings dating from 1844 face away from the river. The navigation now enters the Lee Valley Regional Park and threads its way between flooded gravel pits and Rye Meads sewage treatment works to the north. Just above Brick Lock, the three-storey Roydon mill building is constructed of yellow bricks for the first two storeys, while the third storey is made of weatherboarding on a timber frame. At the lock, the lock-keepers cottage, dating from 1830, still stands. It is constructed of painted brick with a slate roof, and carries an oval plaque with the text "G.D. 1830". This celebrates Sir George Duckett, who was responsible for the construction of the waterway. The final lock is Lower Lock, after which the navigation joins the Lee Navigation, just to the north of Feilde's Weir Lock.

== See also ==
- Canals of the United Kingdom
- History of the British canal system

== Bibliography ==
- Boyes, John; Russell, Ronald (1977). The Canals of Eastern England. David and Charles. ISBN 978-0-7153-7415-3.
- Cumberlidge, Jane (2009). Inland Waterways of Great Britain (8th Ed.). Imray Laurie Norie and Wilson. ISBN 978-1-84623-010-3.
- Nicholson (2006). Nicholson Guides Vol 1: Grand Union, Oxford & the South East. Harper Collins. ISBN 978-0-00-721109-8.
- Paget-Tomlinson, E (2006). Illustrated History of Canal & River Navigations. Landmark Publishing. pp. 180–181. ISBN 1-84306-207-0.
- Priestley, Joseph (1831). "Historical Account of the Navigable Rivers, Canals and Railways of Great Britain".
