= Sheering =

Village in Essex, England

Coordinates: 51.80431°N 0.18451°E

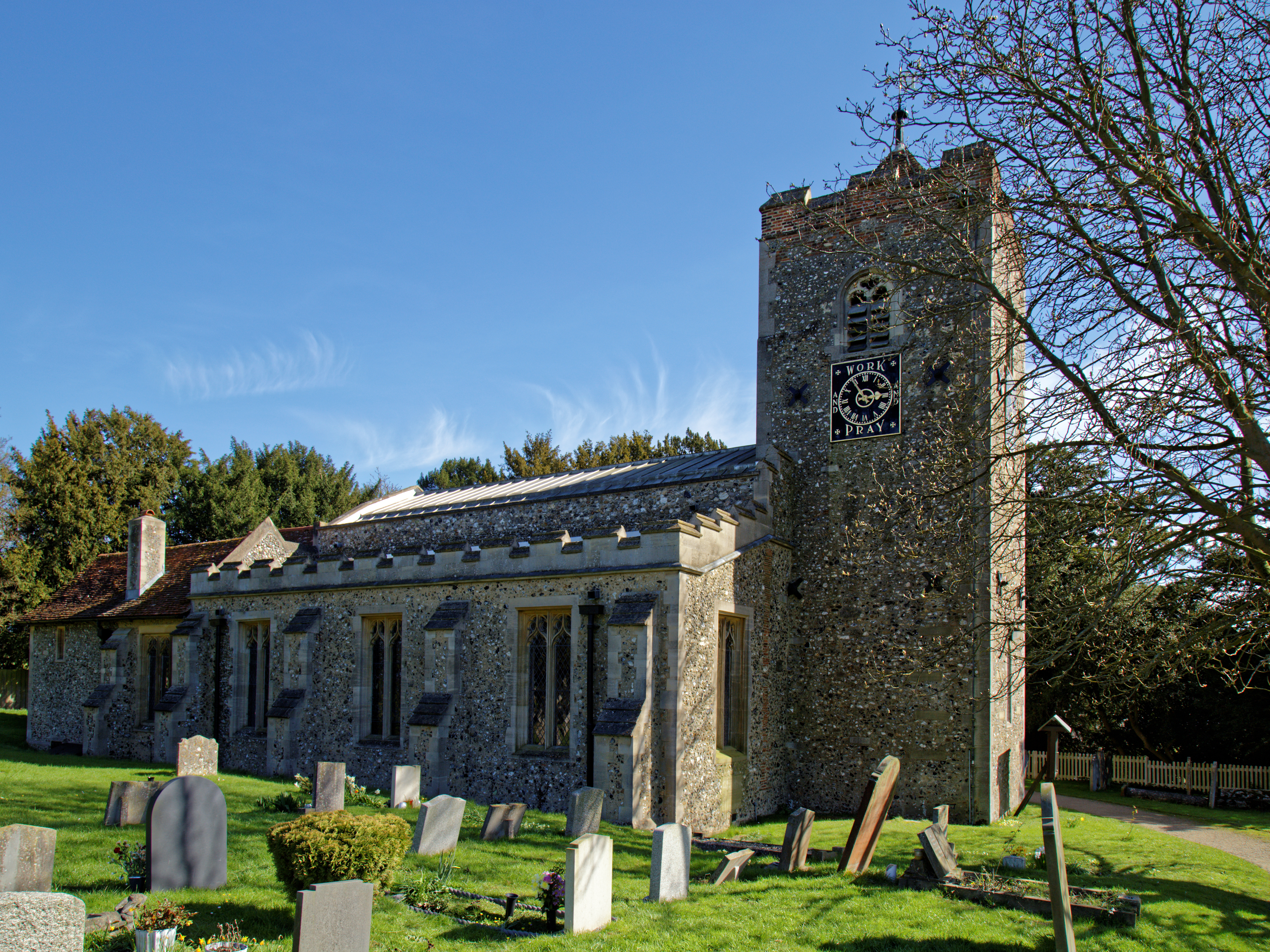
- Church of St Mary the Virgin, Sheering

- Location within Essex
- Population: 3,133 (Parish, 2021)
- Civil parish: Sheering
- District: Epping Forest
- Shire county: Essex
- Region: East
- Country: England
- Sovereign state: United Kingdom
- Post town: BISHOP'S STORTFORD
- Postcode district: CM22
- Dialling code: 01279
- Police: Essex
- Fire: Essex
- Ambulance: East of England
- UK Parliament: Harlow

Sheering is a village and civil parish in the Epping Forest district of Essex, England. The village is situated 2.8 miles (5 km) north-east from Harlow, 4.5 miles (7 km) south of Bishop's Stortford and 25 miles (40 km) north-east from London. The Stort Navigation to the west has a lock at Sheering Mill. Lower Sheering, adjacent to Sawbridgeworth in Hertfordshire and its railway station, forms part of the civil parish. At the 2021 census the parish had a population of 3,133.

There is a Church of England primary school and a public house - The Cock Inn, a general store with a post office, a sandwich shop and a hairdresser's.

Bus services connect Sheering to Harlow and Chelmsford.

The Parish Church of St Mary the Virgin on Church Lane, Sheering is a Grade I listed building. Four other buildings in the parish are Grade II* listed.

== See also ==
- Harry Goschen, baronet of Durrington House in the Parish of Sheering and County of Essex
- Steve Harris (musician) of Iron Maiden
- The Hundred Parishes
