= Roydon, Essex =

Village in Essex, England

Coordinates: 51.773°N 0.0396°E

Roydon
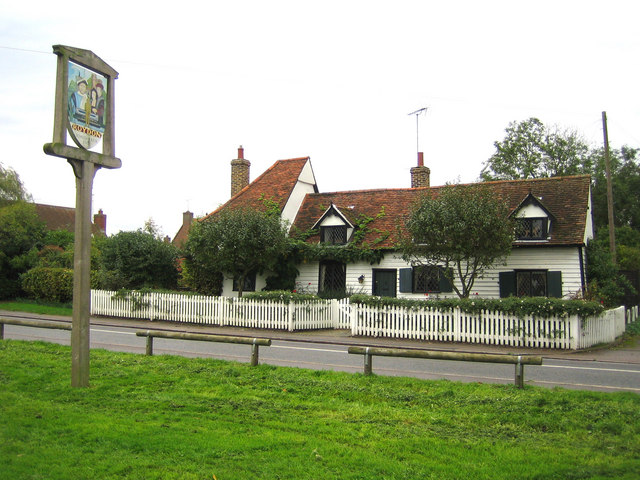
- Roydon, Essex, with village sign

- Location within Essex
- Area: 7.022 km^{2} (2.711 sq mi)
- Population: 3,074 (Parish, 2021)
  - Density: 438/km^{2} (1,130/sq mi)
- OS grid reference: TL408102
- Civil parish: Roydon
- District: Epping Forest
- Shire county: Essex
- Region: East
- Country: England
- Sovereign state: United Kingdom
- Post town: HARLOW
- Postcode district: CM19
- Dialling code: 01279
- Police: Essex
- Fire: Essex
- Ambulance: East of England
- UK Parliament: Harlow

Roydon is a village and civil parish in the Epping Forest district of Essex, England. It is located 2 miles (3.2 km) west of Harlow, 4 miles (6.4 km) east of Hoddesdon and 5 miles (8.0 km) north-west of Epping, forming part of the border with Hertfordshire. At the 2021 census the parish had a population of 3,074.

The village lies on the Stort Navigation and River Stort. Roydon is recorded in the Domesday Book of 1086 as Ruindune, and appears later as Reidona in c. 1130, as Reindon in 1204, and as Roindon in 1208.

The village has a village shop, sub post office, pharmacy and church. The church, St Peter's, dates from the Middle Ages and was given Grade I listed status on 20 February 1967.

Briggens House, dating back to the 18th century, was used as a forgery centre for the WW2 SOE.

Roydon was ranked as the best London commuter town in 2025.

== Transport ==
=== Train ===
The village is served by Roydon railway station on the West Anglia Main Line, with trains operated by Greater Anglia linking the village to Stratford and Bishops Stortford.

=== Bus ===
Route number	Route	Notes
31	Coopersale to Harlow Bus Station via Epping, Epping Green, Roydon	Mon-Sat

== Education ==
The village has its own primary school, Roydon Primary School. The original school building was built in 1876.

== Poplars ==
Roydon is known for its black poplar trees, particularly the World's End Poplar. The Roydon Countrycare Section of the Roydon Society received £3,467 from the Heritage Lottery Fund for the Black Poplar Project.

== Recreation ==
The village is the home of the Roydon Marina Village. The 32 acres (13 ha) holiday complex comprises a 315 berth marina, camp site, holiday lodges, residential homes, hotel, and restaurant, Pizza and Steak. The area encompasses Roydon Mill, a three-storey, brick-built mill, built in 1906.

Angling is available in the park includes a section of the River Stort, the weir pool and a mature gravel pit. Further to the west is the 120 acres (49 ha) Glen Faba lake which is part of the Lee Valley Park. The name Glen Faba comes from a chalet park that was compulsorily purchased by Epping Forest District Council in the early 1970s.

Roydon has one dedicated restaurant, Franco's, and three pubs - The New Inn (now closed), The Crusader (now closed) and The White Hart.

The village hall was built in 1920, and is used by local groups.

== Sport ==
The village's cricket team, Roydon C.C. play at the southern end of Occupation Lane. Football team Roydon F.C. are members of the Essex Olympian Football League Division One and play at Harlow Road. Formed in 1901, the club played in the Hertford & District League from soon after their formation until the 2000–01 season, when they won each of the Hertford & District League Premier Division championship and the Hertford & District League Jubilee Cup for the first time. They joined the Essex Intermediate League Division Three in 2001, and were runners-up in their first season, winning promotion to the Essex Intermediate League Division Two. They were runners-up of Division Two in 2004–05, and, because of the renaming of the league at this time, won promotion to the Essex Olympian Football League Division One. Following a successful fundraising campaign, tennis courts were built in the village in 1989.

== Notable residents ==
- TV entertainer Michael Barrymore; it was at a March 2001 party at his Roydon home that the death of Stuart Lubbock occurred. Lubbock, 31, was found floating in Barrymore's swimming pool.
- Musician David Gilmour
- Actor Ray Winstone
- Actress Jaime Winstone
- Physicist Sir Ralph Howard Fowler
- Politician Lord Rushcliffe
- Businessman Lord Sheppard
