= Harlow railway station =

Harlow railway station may refer to:

- Harlow Town railway station, the main railway station for the town of Harlow
- Harlow Mill railway station, Harlow's second (less used) railway station, previously known as Harlow railway station
