= Rushy Mead =

Nature reserve in Essex, England

Coordinates: 51.8549°N 0.1722°E

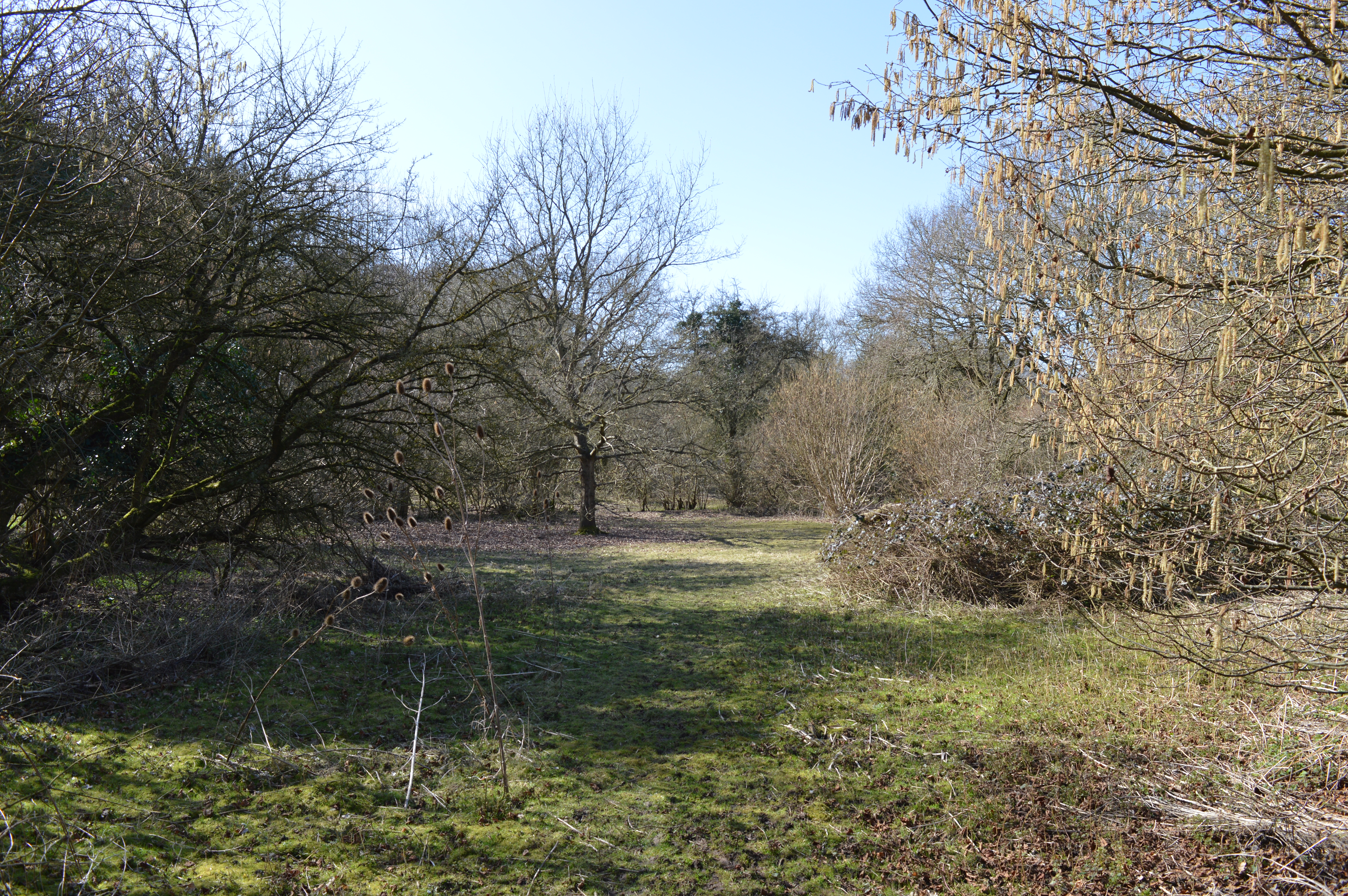
- Interactive map of Rushy Mead
- Type: Nature reserve
- Location: Great Hallingbury, Essex
- OS grid: TL 497 196
- Area: 4.6 hectares (11 acres)
- Manager: Essex Wildlife Trust

Rushy Mead is a 4.6-hectare (11-acre) nature reserve on the bank of the River Stort in Essex, between Sawbridgeworth and Bishop's Stortford. Until the 1950s it was the site of a pumping station for a sewage works. It is owned by Thames Water and Wimpey Homes, and managed by the Essex Wildlife Trust. The name Rushy Mead comes from an old map showing the area as riverside meadows.

The site has areas of sedges and reeds with water near the surface all year. They provide protection for snipe and water rails in the winter, and sedge and reed warblers in the summer. The northern part is alder woodland with some ash and willow. In drier areas there is chalk grassland which supports a wide variety of wild flowers. The site also has many species of invertebrates.

There is access from the Stort navigation towpath and from Hallingbury Road.
