= Posh and Becks =

Victoria and David Beckham

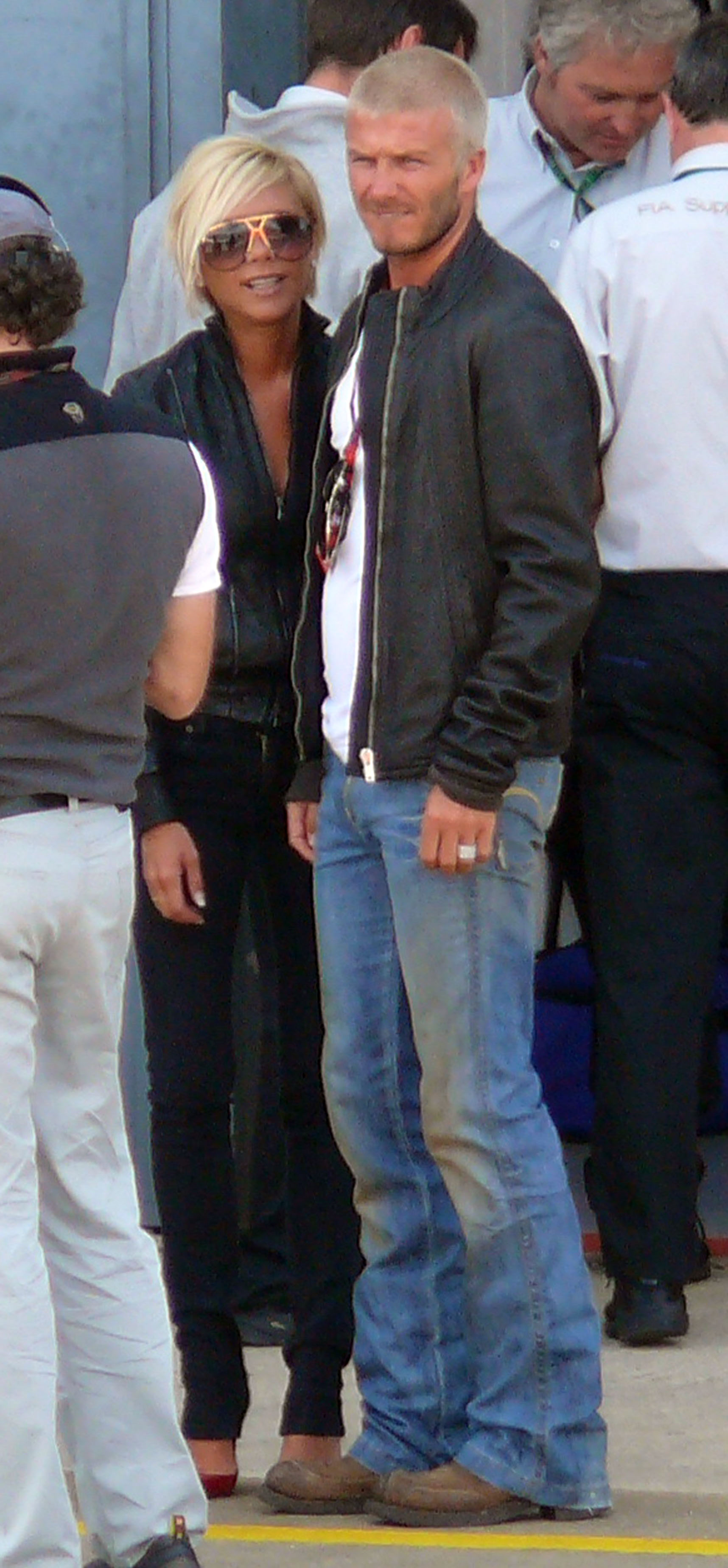
Victoria (Posh Spice) and David Beckham in 2007

Posh and Becks is a widely used nickname for the British celebrity supercouple Victoria Beckham (born 1974, née Adams, "Posh Spice" of the Spice Girls) and David Beckham (born 1975, a footballer and former England captain). Posh & Becks is also the title of a book about the couple by Andrew Morton.

The pair started dating in 1997, which led to the use of the term by the popular media. Their celebrity wedding took place on 4 July 1999, and the home in Hertfordshire, England, that they bought shortly afterwards has been nicknamed by the media as "Beckingham Palace" (a portmanteau of Buckingham Palace and the name Beckham). They have four children: sons Brooklyn Joseph Beckham, Romeo James Beckham, and Cruz David Beckham; and daughter Harper Seven Beckham.

"Posh and Becks" as a phrase was included in the Collins Concise English Dictionary in 2001. The term "Posh and Becks" is commonly used by newspapers and other media, especially in headlines, and has become a well-known phrase within UK popular culture. The term "Posh and Becks" has also found its way into rhyming slang, referring to "sex".
