= Sawbridgeworth Marsh =

Site of Special Scientific Interest

Coordinates: 51.8209°N 0.1634°E

- Site of Special Scientific Interest
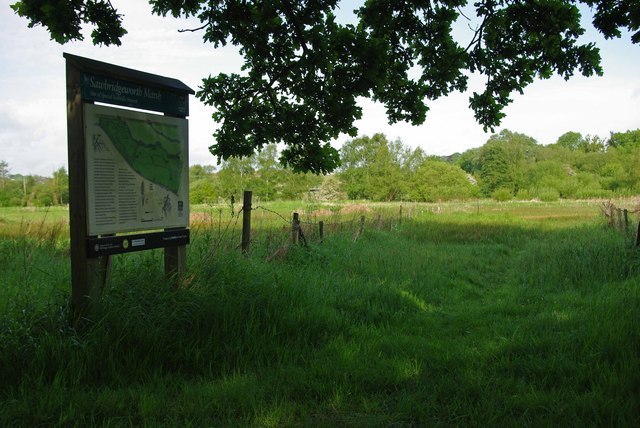
- Location of Sawbridgeworth Marsh.
- Area of search: Hertfordshire; Essex
- Grid reference: TL492158
- Interest: Biological
- Area: 6.3 ha (16 acres)
- Notification date: 1986
- Location map: Magic Map

Sawbridgeworth Marsh is a 6.3-hectare (16-acre) biological Site of Special Scientific Interest (SSSI) near Sawbridgeworth in Hertfordshire, apart from a small area in the north which is in Essex. It is managed by the Essex Wildlife Trust. The planning authorities are East Hertfordshire District Council and Uttlesford District Council. (Note: Comparison of the Natural England (NE) map with the county boundaries shows that a very small area in the north of the site is in Essex. The Natural England citation shows it in both counties and jointly owned by the Essex and Herts and Middlesex Wildlife Trusts, but it is not included in the NE list of Essex SSSIs. The site is also not included in the Wikipedia list of Essex SSSIs as this is based on the NE list. The Essex Wildlife Trust page on the site states that it is jointly owned, but it is not listed on the Herts and Middlesex Wildlife Trust website.)

The site is a river valley marsh close to the River Stort, which has a varied wetland flora. Grazing and cutting of the marsh in rotation maintain biological diversity. The site also has an important wetland fauna and many moth species. Uncommon plants include marsh willowherb, marsh valerian and marsh arrow-grass, and drainage ditches and two ponds have a rich aquatic life.

The site is always open and there is access from Hallingbury Road.
