= Harlow Mill railway station =

Railway station in Essex, England

Harlow Mill
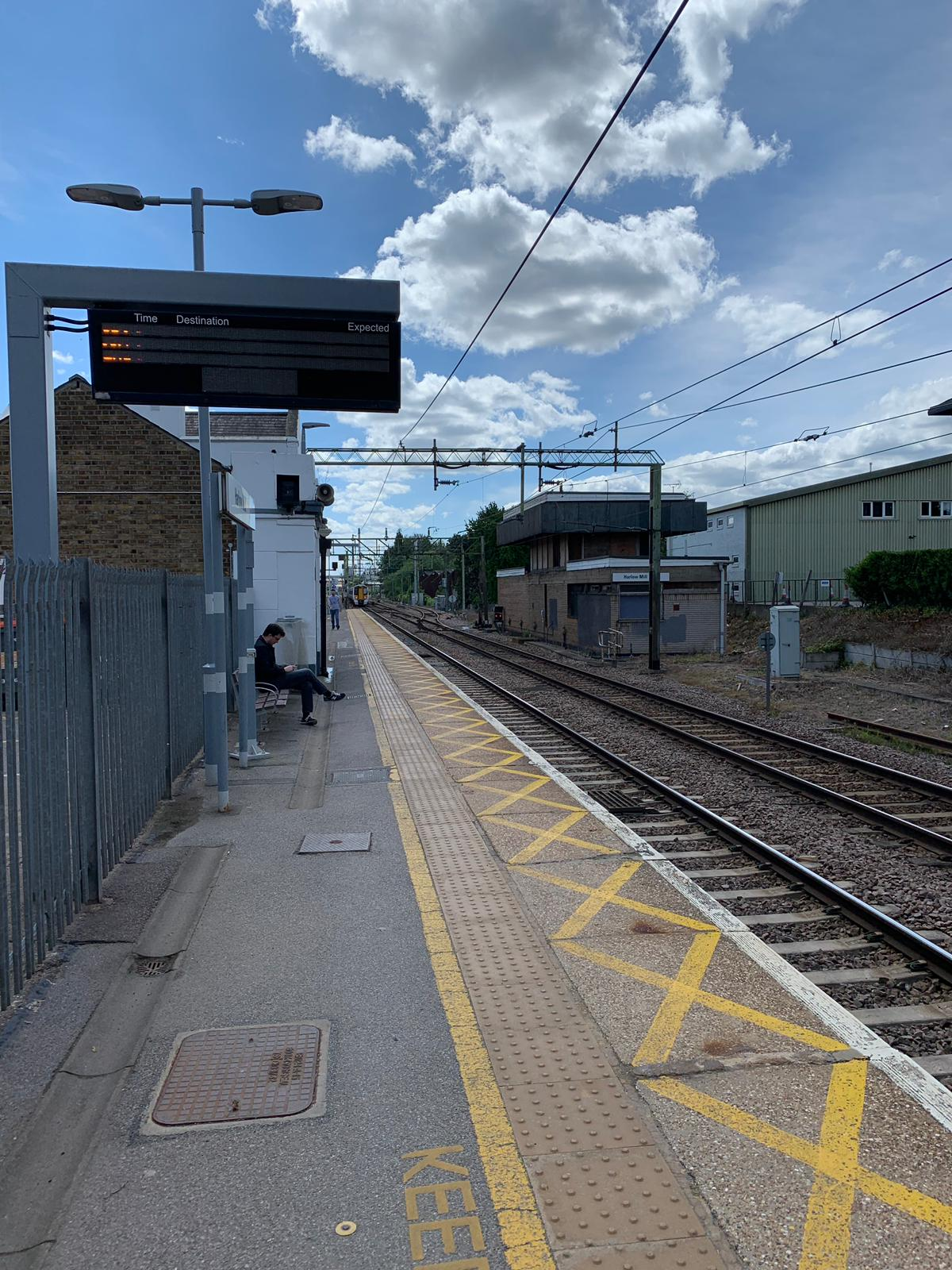
- Harlow Mill railway station in 2019

General information
- Location: Old Harlow, Harlow; England
- Coordinates: 51.79°N 0.132°E
- Grid reference: TL471123
- Owner: Network Rail
- Manager: Greater Anglia
- Platforms: 2

Other information
- Station code: HWM
- Classification: DfT category E

History
- Opened: 1842

Passengers
- 2020/21: ▼67,976
- 2021/22: ▲0.165 million
- 2022/23: ▲0.205 million
- 2023/24: ▲0.241 million
- 2024/25: ▲0.279 million
Location
Notes
- Passenger statistics from the Office of Rail and Road

Harlow Mill railway station is on the West Anglia Main Line serving the eastern part of Harlow in Essex, England. It is 24 miles 36 chains (39.3 km) down the line from London Liverpool Street and is situated between Harlow Town and Sawbridgeworth stations. Its three-letter station code is HWM.

The station and all trains serving it are operated by Greater Anglia.

== History ==
The station was opened in 1842 as Harlow, on the Northern and Eastern Railway's line between London and Bishop's Stortford. It served the village of the same name, located on the London to Cambridge toll road. In the late 1940s, as the new town of Harlow was being built, the original village of Harlow was named Old Harlow and incorporated as a district in the new town. The station was renamed Harlow Mill on 13 July 1960, after the mill on the River Stort, just north of the station.

In 2023, a series of improvements were made at the station. The car park was expanded by ten spaces and a new 12-space cycle storage facility was installed, providing six more cycle spaces than previously. A new waiting room on platform 1 was also installed.

== Services ==
All services at Harlow Mill are operated by Greater Anglia using Class 720 EMUs.

The typical off-peak service in trains per hour is:

- 1 tph to London Liverpool Street
- 1 tph to Stratford
- 1 tph to Bishop's Stortford
- 1 tph to Cambridge North

During the peak hours, the station is served by an additional hourly service between London Liverpool Street and Cambridge. The station is also served by a small number of peak hour services to and from Ely.

On Sundays, the services between Stratford and Bishop's Stortford do not run.

Preceding station	National Rail	Following station
Harlow Town	Greater Anglia West Anglia Main Line	Sawbridgeworth
