= Rowneybury House =

House in Sawbridgeworth, Hertfordshire, England

Coordinates: 51.7983°N 0.1356°E

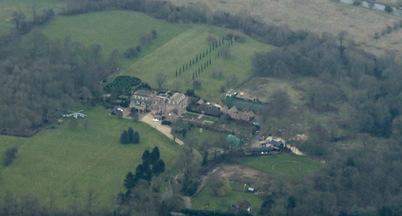
Rowneybury House from the air

Rowneybury House /ˈraʊnibəri/ is a house in Sawbridgeworth, Hertfordshire, England.

The property on which Rowneybury stands was part of Pishiobury before being divided in the 1880s. It was owned by Hertfordshire County Council and used as a home for children with disabilities. The original property had two upper floors, and a cellar under the majority of the main building. After lying empty for several years, it was purchased from the Council and renovated. In 1999, the property was purchased by Spice Girl Victoria Beckham and her husband David Beckham for £2.5 million. The property became dubbed "Beckingham Palace" by the press as a portmanteau of their surname and Buckingham Palace. They spent around £3 million on refurbishment, including a maze designed by James Gardner, in the grounds. In 2001, Victoria Beckham made a virtual tour of the mansion available online.

The property was put up for sale by the Beckhams in 2013. The house, with 17 acres (6.9 ha) of grounds, was bought by the insurance tycoon Neil Utley, chairman of Hastings Direct, and Narmali Utley for £11.35 million in 2014.

Rowneybury Cottage, near the entrance to the estate on Harlow Road, is a Grade II listed building. This timberframed house, dating from the late 16th-century to early 17th-century, was listed in 1981.
