= Paul Hamilton (architect) =

British architect (1924–2004)

Paul Hamilton (1924–2004) was a British architect of Austrian origin.

== Early life ==
Paul Hamilton was born Paul Albert Herschan in Vienna, Austria. He attended the Gymnasium Kundmanngasse in 1935 in Vienna. Paul was expelled along with 49 other Jewish pupils in Apr 1938. His parents left Vienna for Brno, Czech Republic, while he stayed with an Aunt in Vienna and then came as a child refugee to Britain via the Kindertransport in May 1939.

His sponsor was the eminent Psychiatrist Dr Hugh Crichton-Miller and the Crichton-Millers became his foster family; Paul was sent to board at Taunton School, Somerset.

His father Max and Camilla Herschan were murdered at Terezín concentration camp in January 1942.

== Military service ==
Paul Herschan joined the British Army in 1943, changing his surname to Hamilton. He served in the 12th Battalion The Parachute Regiment, taking part in the D Day landings as a Pathfinder; he was badly wounded. On returning to fitness he was promoted to Sergeant, and took part in the Rhine Crossing Operation Varsity. The unit then moved to the Far East, taking part in Operation Tiderace, and actions in Singapore and Java. He was demobbed in Sep 1947 in London and formally became a British subject. His military career and experiences of D Day is mentioned in Helen Fry's Book "The King's Most Loyal Enemy Aliens."

== Education ==
He trained at the Architectural Association in London, starting in 1948. His fellow student was John Bicknell with whom he later went into architectural partnership

== Work ==
Paul Hamilton often collaborated with John Bicknell; starting at the AA and later at British Rail, they formed the two partner architectural practice of Bicknell & Hamilton.

His notable works include:

- The Tallac House which featured in the 1992 film, The Bodyguard, with Whitney Houston and Kevin Costner
- Harlow Town railway station
- Paddington Maintenance Depot: Lorry workshops, offices and boiler house (1968) at London Paddington station; known as the Battleship Building. Adjacent is The Rotunda, since 2003 offices of Nissan Design Europe.
- Signal box at Birmingham New Street railway station
- Jordleys, Goring on Thames. House for private client. Later bought and lived in by the Bicknell family
- Helen House, Oxford, 1982. Worlds first children hospice
