= Sawbridgeworth Cricket Club =

Sawbridgeworth Cricket Club
Club Formed	1862
Main Ground	Town Fields, Sawbridgeworth, Hertfordshire
Second Ground	Leventhorpe School, Sawbridgeworth, Hertfordshire, CM21 9BY
1st XI League	Home Counties Premier League, Div 1 East
Other Leagues	Saracens Hertfordshire League Div 4, 8 Herts and Essex Cricket League Div 6
League History	1974–present
Honours	Herts League: Twice; Herts Cup: Once; Herts Plate: Once; Herts 2nd XI League: Once

Sawbridgeworth Cricket Club is a cricket club located in Sawbridgeworth, Hertfordshire, England.

The main ground is at Town Fields in the centre of Sawbridgeworth, behind Bell Street, the main commercial street in the town. The club's second ground is situated at The Leventhorpe School, to the north of the town.

== Club history ==
Cricket was probably first-played in Sawbridgeworth in the eighteenth century, however the first definite match was in 1823 when two games were played against Saffron Walden. The town had an informal cricket team for many years, home matches played at Pishiobury Park, until the vicar of Sawbridgeworth's Great St Mary's Church, Reverend Arthur Drummond, formed a more formal club in 1862. The first permanent ground was at Rowney Field, and the club moved to Town Fields in 1877.

== Honours ==
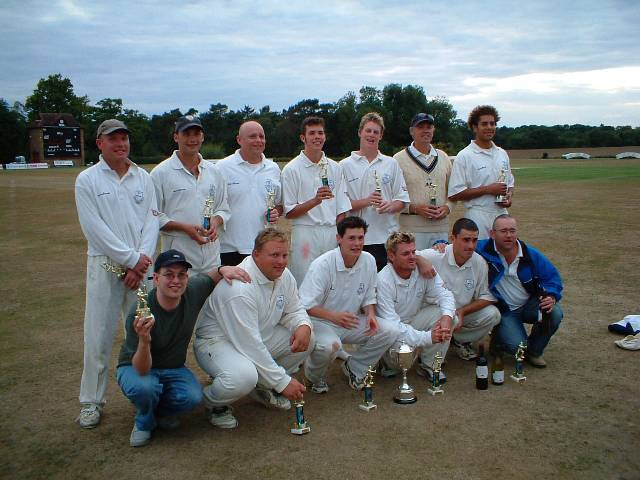
Sawbridgeworth after winning the Hertfordshire Becker Cup in 2003

- Hertfordshire League winners - 1984, 2003 (Div 1)
- Hertfordshire Cup winners - 2003
- Hertfordshire Plate winners - 2004
- Hertfordshire T20 winners - 2015
- Hertfordshire Second XI Championship winners - 1975

== Club Records (All Games 1862-2019) ==
- Most Appearances - Ted Levey (1,776)
- Most Runs - Ted Levey (43,703)
- Most Wickets - Ernie Clarke (1,320)
- Highest Innings Total - 428-3 declared, 23 August 2002 versus Essex Tools at Town Fields
- Highest Individual Score - Matt Birch (223)

== Notable players ==
- Ryan Cunningham
- Andrew Richardson
