= Roydon railway station =

Railway station in Essex, England

Roydon
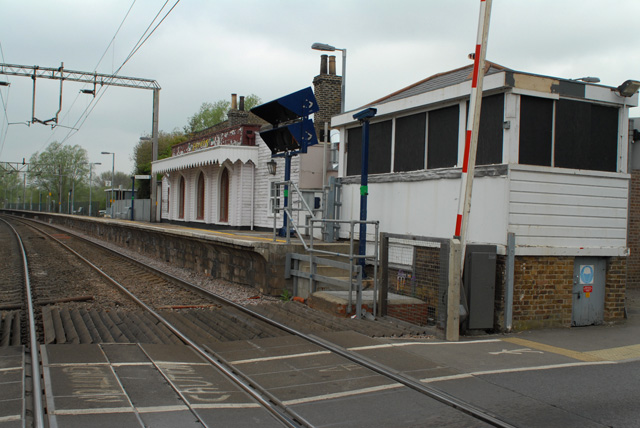

General information
- Location: Roydon, Epping Forest District; England
- Coordinates: 51.775°N 0.036°E
- Grid reference: TL405104
- Owner: Network Rail
- Manager: Greater Anglia
- Platforms: 2

Other information
- Station code: RYN
- Classification: DfT category E

History
- Opened: 1844

Passengers
- 2020/21: ▼40,704
- 2021/22: ▲0.101 million
- 2022/23: ▲0.102 million
- 2023/24: ▲0.121 million
- 2024/25: ▲0.133 million
Location
Notes
- Passenger statistics from the Office of Rail and Road

Roydon railway station is on the West Anglia Main Line serving the village of Roydon in Essex, England. It is 20 miles 9 chains (32.4 km) down the line from London Liverpool Street and is situated between Broxbourne and Harlow Town stations. Its three-letter station code is RYN.

The station and all trains serving it are operated by Greater Anglia.

== History ==
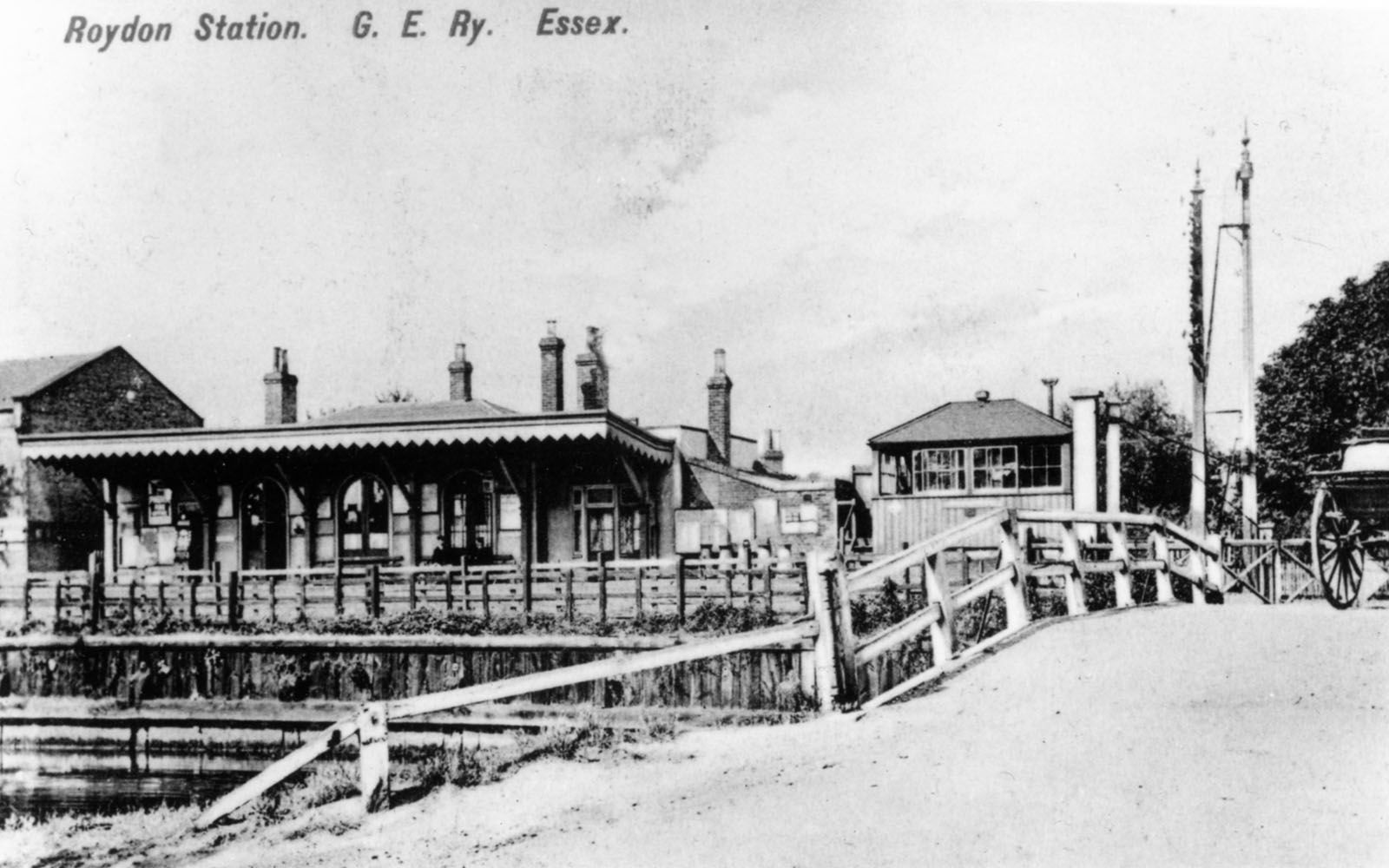
The station circa 1900

The station was designed by Francis Thompson and opened by the Northern and Eastern Railway in 1844. The main station building was abandoned by British Railways in 1978 and remained unoccupied until being converted into a restaurant. The station was given Grade II listed status on 30 April 1971.

The station's signal box, built in 1876, is one of only two surviving examples of the GER Type I signal box.

In 2016 the station's ticket office was demolished, and a waiting room was built on its foundations. Additional customer information screens, ticket machines, and improved CCTV and lighting were added at the same time.

== Services ==
Roydon is unusual in that it is the only station on the West Anglia Main line served solely on the Stratford - Bishops Stortford services, of which are all operated by Greater Anglia using Class 720 EMUs.

The typical off-peak service in trains per hour is:

- 2tph to Stratford
- 2tph to Bishop's Stortford

During peak hours, half hourly trains run between Cambridge and London Liverpool Street instead.

On Sundays, there is an hourly service between Liverpool Street and Cambridge North.

Preceding station	National Rail	Following station
Broxbourne	Greater Anglia West Anglia Main Line	Harlow Town
