= Spellbrook =

Coordinates: 51.837°N 0.155°E

- Location within Hertfordshire
- Population: 275 (2005 est.)
- District: East Hertfordshire
- Shire county: Hertfordshire
- Region: East
- Country: England
- Sovereign state: United Kingdom
- Post town: SAWBRIDGEWORTH
- Postcode district: CM21
- Dialling code: 01279
- Police: Hertfordshire
- Fire: Hertfordshire
- Ambulance: East of England
- UK Parliament: Hertford and Stortford

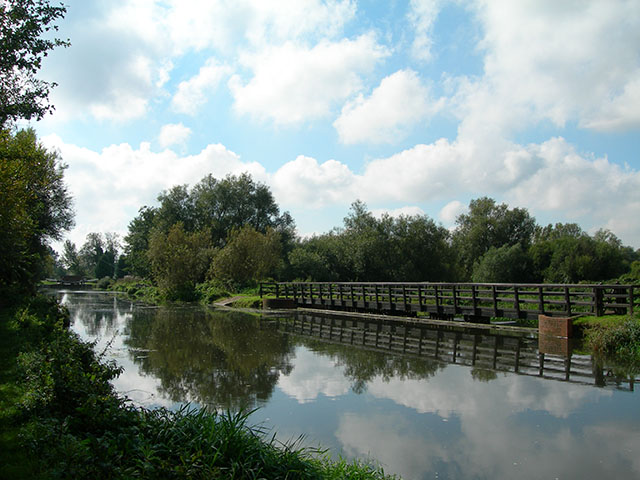
Spellbrook Weir on the Stort

Spellbrook is a hamlet in Hertfordshire, situated between Bishop's Stortford and Sawbridgeworth.

== Location ==
Spellbrook is one mile south of Bishop's Stortford, thirteen miles east of Hertford and ten miles north of Epping. It lies on the A1184 The river Stort flows through the east of the town, past the Three Horseshoes public house. It has a school, Spellbrook Primary

Nearby towns and cities: Bishop's Stortford, Sawbridgeworth

Nearby villages: Trimms Green, Allen's Green, Little Hallingbury

== Politics and local government ==
Spellbrook is administered by East Hertfordshire district council.

Sawbridgeworth Town Council also covers Spellbrook.

== History & notable events ==
In 1966, the criminal Harry Roberts was captured near Spellbrook (in Thorley Woods) in a former air hanger (used for storing hay), after murdering three policemen. This was the culmination of Britain's then largest ever manhunt, which had lasted 98 days.
