= Alexander Annesley =

English legal and political writer

Alexander Annesley (died December 1813, aged 60), was an English legal and political writer of the late eighteenth century.

== Biography ==
Annesley was a London solicitor and member of the Inner Temple. After many years' practice, by which he acquired a large fortune, he retired to Hyde Hall, Sawbridgeworth, Hertfordshire, and died there on 6 December 1813. He is buried in Great St Mary's, Sawbridgeworth, and there is a funerary hatchment and a wall monument to him there with 15 December given as the date of death.

Annesley was a man of many accomplishments, paid repeated visits to the continent, and was an enthusiastic sportsman. In politics he followed William Pitt.

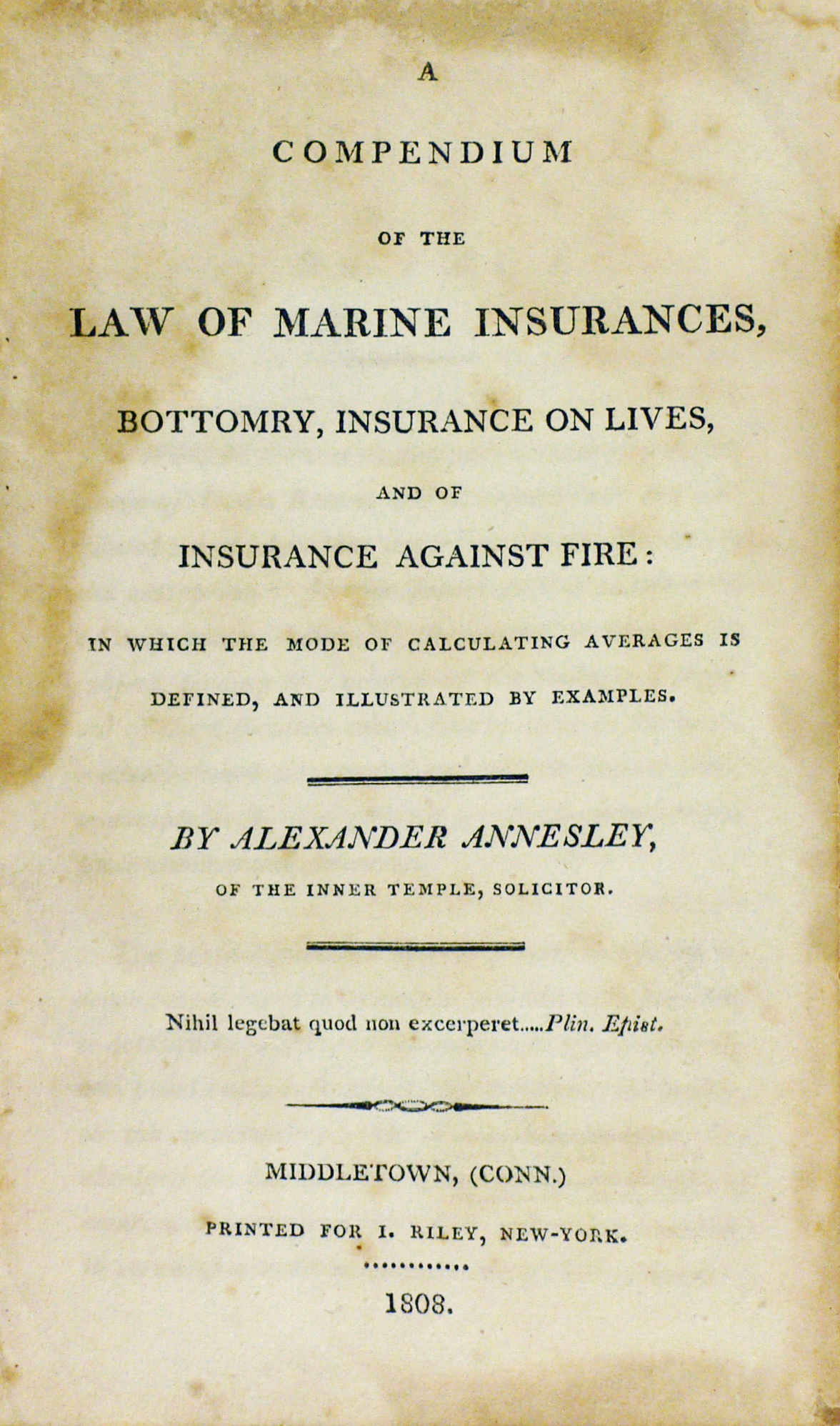
Compendium of the law of marine insurances, 1808 (Milano, Mansutti Foundation)

His works are:

1. Strictures on the true Cause of the present alarming Scarcity of Grain and Provisions, and a Plan for permanent Relief, 1800. Annesley proposed ‘bounties on production rather than on importation, an excise on all grain, the establishment of public granaries and additional corn-mills.’
2. Observations on the Danger of a Premature Peace, 1800.
3. A Compendium of the Law of Marine Insurance, Bottomry, Insurance on Lives, and of Insurance against Fire, in which the mode of calculating averages is defined and illustrated by example, 1808
