= Andrew Richardson (Jamaican cricketer) =

Jamaican cricketer (born 1981)

Personal information
- Full name: Andrew Peter Richardson
- Born: 6 September 1981 (age 45); Kingston, Jamaica
- Height: 191 cm (6 ft 3 in)
- Batting: Left-handed
- Bowling: Right-arm fast-medium
- Role: Bowler

Career statistics
Competition	FC	LA	T20
Matches	68	36	2
Runs scored	711	98	0
Batting average	9.73	14.00	–
100s/50s	0/0	0/0	–
Top score	31*	23*	0*
Balls bowled	8,490	1,430	36
Wickets	192	29	3
Bowling average	23.96	41.89	12.00
5 wickets in innings	6	0	0
10 wickets in match	0	0	0
Best bowling	5/32	4/36	2/16
Catches/stumpings	24/–	8/–	1/–
- Source: CricketArchive, 10 September 2022

Andrew Peter Richardson (born 6 September 1981) is a former West Indian cricketer who played in the role of a right arm fast medium bowler. Richardson picked up 192 wickets at an average of 23.96 in his first class career. He also featured for West Indies in the 2000 Under-19 Cricket World Cup, Jamaica, Sawbridgeworth Cricket Club and the Jamaica Tallawahs.

== Playing career ==
During the 2008/09 season, Richardson helped Jamaica win the Regional Four Day Competition by taking 33 wickets at an average of 23.12. Following this, it was announced that Richardson would replace the out of form Darren Powell in the West Indies squad for the tour England in April 2009. Chairman of selector, Clyde Butts, said "This year Richardson has been bowling very well and deserves his selection. He is tall, accurate and has the ability to get wickets at crucial stages in the game".
