= Pishiobury =

Manor and estate in Hertfordshire, England

Coordinates: 51.800°N 0.143°W

Pishiobury Park, as remodelled or rebuilt in 1782–84 by Jeremiah III Milles (1751-1797) to the designs of James Wyatt. Coloured lithograph from Neale's, Views of Seats 1821

Pishiobury, sometimes spelled Pishobury, was a manor and estate in medieval Sawbridgeworth, Hertfordshire. Its denomination as "Pishiobury" only emerged in the mid to late 19th century.

== History ==
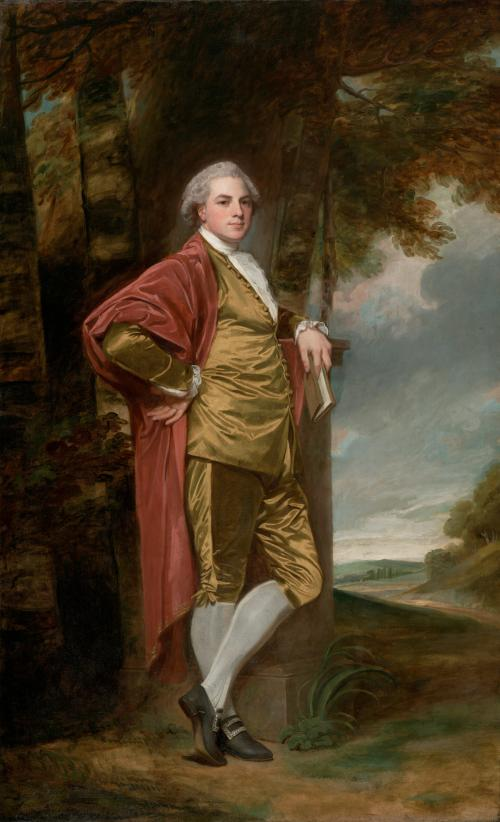
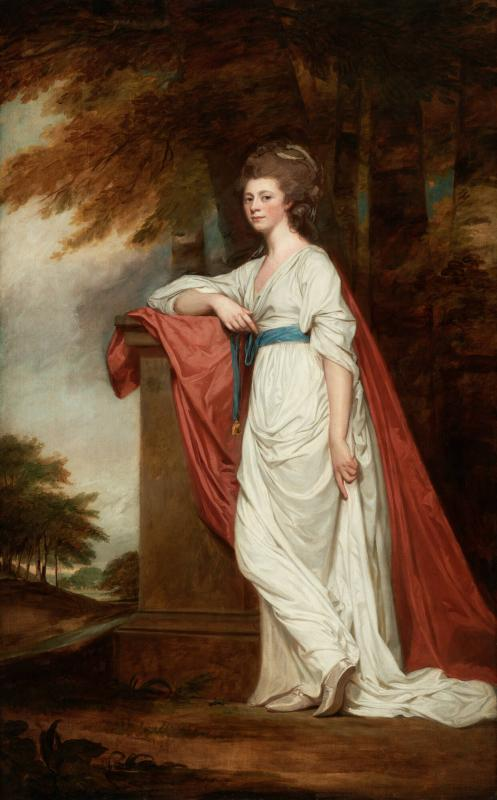
Matching portraits of Jeremiah III Milles (1751-1797) and his wife Rose Gardiner (1757-1835), heiress of Pishiobury, Hertfordshire, painted by George Romney c. 1780/83. Collection of Huntington Library Art Gallery, California

This sub-manor of Pishiobury originated in a grant of 74 libartes of land within the Manor of Sawbridgeworth in Braughing Hundred, which Geoffrey de Mandeville, 1st Earl of Essex, who died in 1144, made to Warin FitzGerold and Henry FitzGerold to hold by service of one Knight for each 20 libartes. Henry survived his brother, but his niece Margaret FitzGerold/FitzWarin inherited Pishiobury. She had married in 1200 Baldwin de Redvers, son of William de Redvers, 5th Earl of Devon, and in 1228 she levied a fine with William de Saye by which it was agreed that William and his heirs were to have free warren, a hunting right, throughout Sawbridgeworth.

The successive Lords of the manor of Pishiobury had local hunting rights and their own park, too. In 1248 William de Saye granted the heiress of Pishiobury, Margaret FitzGerold/FitzeWarin, wife of Baldwin de Redvers, the right of free hunting on her own estate with dogs, birds or nets, and free fishing in the river where it joined her lands; in return she recognized the de Sayes' right to have free warren over the whole Sawbridgeworth, including Pishiobury.

This agreement shows how the right of other manors developed out of the original manorial powers of John, Lord Robert Lisle's son, kept 12 acres (49,000 m^{2}) of underwood from the land called Vodeleye; the park of Gedelesho and Gedelesho Wood (Gilston) and its keeper are mentioned, so presumably this was the manorial park. That the estate had some boundary fence or bank marking it off from neighbouring land is suggested by a reference to a house, on the left hand side within the second gare, which contained two chambres for habitation. Some idea of the size of Pishiobury estate emerges from the long lease which Richard le Scrope, 1st Baron Scrope of Bolton, granted to John Chauncy in 1400. The property then consisted of 319½ acres of arable, 58 acres (230,000 m^{2}) of pasture and 36 acres (150,000 m^{2}) of meadow - houses and an orchard. In 1534, Lord Scrope, sold the manor to Henry VIII who granted it to Queen Anne Boleyn; an extent made at this time once again describes the estate. The perimeter of the park was nearly two miles; it was well wooded with game, deer and rabbits, and there was a lodge on one side for the keeper: could this have been the house within the second gate of 1343? There was a moated house within the park with stabling for twenty horses. The house was described as "somewhat fallen into decay"; it was replaced in 1585 by a new house built by Sir Walter Mildmay. Chauncy described it as a "very neat and fair Pile of building for the Manor-house, upon a rising Ground in the Vale near the River Stort, lately converted into a Paddock for Deer, adorned in the Front thereof with a fair Bowling Green, raised about five Foot high, enclosed with a Brick Wall top with stone, and balls upon it, and two fair walks planted with trees; each walk extending about four Furlongs in length from the house to the road; where it is observable that there is no dust in summer, nor no dirt winter, a clear description of the setting of an Elizabethan house in its ground. The estate passed from the Gardiner family on the marriage of Rose Gardiner (1757-1835) (whose memorial tablet exists in St Mary's Church, Sawbridgeworth), daughter and heiress of Edward Gardiner (d.1779) of Pishiobury, to Jeremiah III Milles (1751-1797), son of Rev. Jeremiah II Milles (d.1784), Dean of Exeter. The house was remodelled or rebuilt by Jeremiah III Milles to the designs of James Wyatt in 1782–84. It was then illustrated in John Preston Neale's Views of Seats of 1821.

The mansion is now Grade II* listed; other buildings of the grounds are Grade II or II*.

The estate was sold into divided ownership in the early 20th century. From 1941, the main building was used as an approved school. Now, it is used as an office building. Parts of the park have been subject to housing development.

== Residents of Pishiobury ==
Geoffrey de Mandeville, 1st Earl of Essex, who died in 1144, made the sub-manor of Pishiobury originated in a grant of 74 libartes of land within the main Manor of Sawbridgeworth to Warin FitzGerold and Henry FitzGerold, to hold by service of one Knight for each 20 libartes.

Henry survived his brother, but his niece Margaret FitzWarin (Gerold) inherited Pishiobury. She married in 1200 Baldwin de Redvers, 6th Earl of Devon.

Margaret was succeeded at Pishiobury by her son, also Baldwin de Redvers, 7th Earl of Devon, on whose death without issue, his widow Countess Margaret de Savoy had livery of the Manor until her death in 1292. It then passed to Earl Baldwin's sister Isabella de Redvers, Countess of Abalina, who died the following year and was succeeded at Pishiobury by her daughter Abalina de Fortibus, wife of Edmund Earl of Lancaster, second son to King Edward I. Her cousin, Hugh de Courtnay, great-great grandson of William de Redvers was her heir, but Warin de Lisle claimed Pishiobury in right of his son Robert de Lisl and was successful in 1310 (Henry Fitzgerald's daughter Alice was married with Robert de Lisle).

Robert de Lisle was summoned as Lord Lisle in 1311 and on his death in 1343 was succeeded by his grandson John Lord Lisle who died in 1356. Robert de Lisle was succeeded by his son William Lord Lisle who in 1393 granted Pishiobury to Richard Scrope, 1st Baron Scrope of Bolton.

It remained in the Scropes, until 1534 when the 8th Lord Scrope sold it King Henry VIII, who annexed it to the Royal Honour of Hudson. An extend of the Manor, probably for the King at about this time, describes the park at Pishiobury to be nearly two miles in circumference, well wooded and supplied with game, deer and foxes.

Pishiobury was also enjoyed for a short period by Anne Boleyn on whose execution it reverted to the Crown. Kind Edward VI granted it to a gentleman of the Chamber and in 1555 it was held by Thomas Mildmay, whose son, Sir Walter Mildmay, began the present house in 1585. In 1611, Sir Thomas Mildmay sold the manor of Pishiobury to Lord Lionel Cranfield. The Hewett Baronetcy, of Pishiobury in the County of Hertford, was created on 19 July 1660 for Thomas Hewett, Member of Parliament for Windsor but the title became extinct on the first viscount's death in 1689.

Later residents include Rowland Alston (1782–1865), the brewer Francis Charrington and Francis William Buxton (1847–1911), barrister and Liberal Party politician.
