= Lower Sheering =

Coordinates: 51.809°N 0.161°E

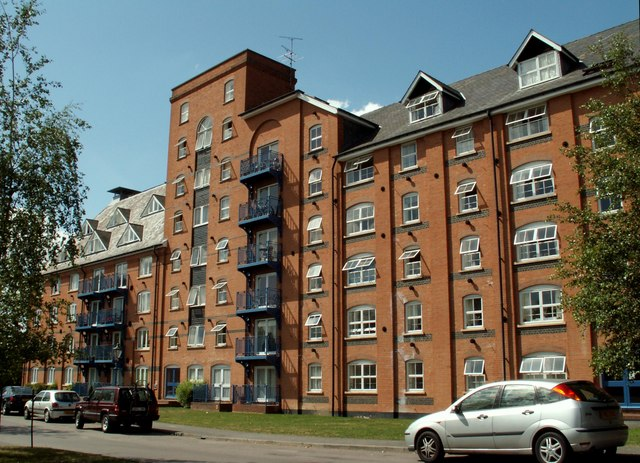
- Waterside Place

- Location within Essex
- Civil parish: Sheering
- District: Epping Forest
- Shire county: Essex
- Region: East
- Country: England
- Sovereign state: United Kingdom
- Police: Essex
- Fire: Essex
- Ambulance: East of England

Lower Sheering is a residential dormitory area based on Sheering Lower Road, in the civil parish of Sheering, and the Epping Forest district of Essex, England. It conjoins the Hertfordshire town of Sawbridgeworth at the north-east of the Essex town of Harlow.

Lower Sheering has about 1100 households and lies in the Stort Valley. Businesses include The Maltings, close to Sawbridgeworth railway station on the West Anglia Main Line between Cambridge and Liverpool Street.
