= Langley, Essex =

Village in Essex, England

Coordinates: 51.995551°N 0.103296°E

Langley
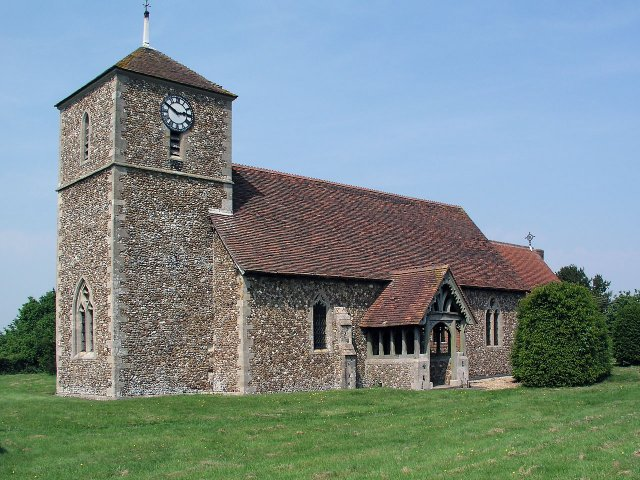
- Langley Church

- Location within Essex
- Population: 376 (Parish, 2021)
- OS grid reference: TL445351
- District: Uttlesford
- Shire county: Essex
- Region: East
- Country: England
- Sovereign state: United Kingdom
- Post town: SAFFRON WALDEN
- Postcode district: CB11
- Dialling code: 01799
- Police: Essex
- Fire: Essex
- Ambulance: East of England

For the historic house in Essex called Langley's, see Great Waltham.

Langley is a village and civil parish near Clavering in the English county of Essex, seven miles west-south-west of Saffron Walden. At the 2021 census the parish had a population of 376.

== Governance ==
There is a Langley Parish Council.

It is located in the local government district of Uttlesford and within the Saffron Walden (UK Parliament constituency).

== Topography ==
The Parish of Langley consists of two parts, "Langley Upper Green" and "Langley Lower Green" which are linked by roads and footpaths. Bull Lane connects Upper and Lower Green. The Upper Green has OS grid reference (TL445351) and the Lower Green has OS grid reference (TL437344).

The River Stort passes through Langley Lower Green.

The highest point of the county of Essex at 482 feet (147 m) is near to the village of Langley at Chrishall Common, close to the Hertfordshire border.

== Description ==
Langley in Essex adjoins two other counties Hertfordshire and Cambridgeshire, which are both visible on its horizons and has a Cambridge post code.

The village has large areas of open Common Land as well as ribbons of village green along its roads. The village is very rural; surrounded by arable farming; with numerous public footpaths; narrow country roads, bridleways and byways and is situated along routes very popular with cyclists.

== Village amenities ==
The Upper Green contains the newly erected "Langley Village Hall and Community Centre" from 2021.

The only remaining public house, "The Bull", is located on Bull Lane at the Lower Green.

The village's 12th century, Grade II listed, Church of England parish church, "St John the Evangelist" is located at The Causeway, Langley Upper Green. Its western tower was added in the 14th century and chancel in the 16th century. It stands at around 450 feet above sea level. It was re-opened in 1885 after thorough restorations.

Facing onto the Upper Green at Bull Lane is the Langley Baptist Church. The building dates from 1828, after the formation of a baptist group by villagers in 1826.

The village has an active Women's Institute (the WI).

The parish is home to varied business units, a Rally school and a popular tea-room.

The upper green is a good size for Cricket matches and has a cricket pitch marked on it.

The nearest shop is in Clavering and the nearest supermarkets are in Saffron Walden and Royston. The local doctors surgeries and pharmacies are in Newport. The local post office is at Clavering.

The nearest railway station is Audley End with links to Cambridge, and London and Stansted airport via Bishop's Stortford.

There is no regular public transport.

The village is known for its popular (locally organised through volunteers and parish council) "Langley Village Fete" held on the August Bank Holiday each year on the Upper Green and in the Village Hall.

== History ==
Langley is an Anglo-Saxon name for a long clearing in woodland.

A pathway along the remains of a former Roman road passes along Langley's parish boundary with Clavering.

It has its closest historical connections to Clavering.

Between 1891 and 1895, Walter Hazell (later a liberal MP) hired superintendents to run a training farm from a farmhouse he rented (originally with 4 acres increasing to 28 acres in 1892) in Langley, Essex near Saffron Walden. The training farm was for unemployed and unskilled young men from London unable to obtain work. Whereas the farm was not profitable the success of the skills training led them to move to a 225-acre site in Buckinghamshire instead. Around 100 men (a few boys 14-17 and five aged 40-46, but an average age of 24) were helped. 44 came from lodging houses and refuges. The intention was to gain skills and emigrate to Canada with the Self-Help Emigration Society. The farm was apparently called Bird Tree Farm.

== Wildlife ==
The skies are patrolled by red kites and the village is surrounded by herds of fallow deer.

There are various protected wildflower verges.

== See also ==
- The Hundred Parishes
