= Harlow Town railway station =

Railway station in Essex, England

Harlow Town
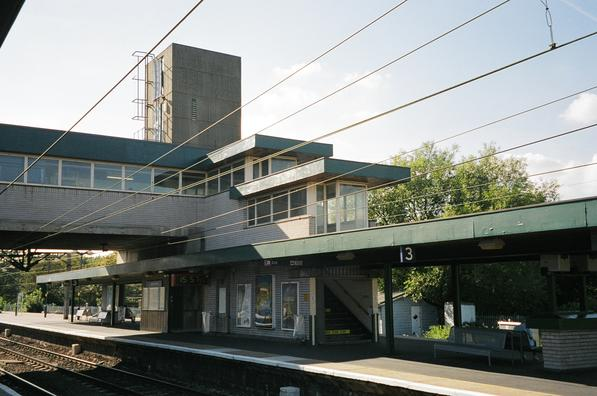
- Platform 3

General information
- Location: Harlow, Harlow District; England
- Coordinates: 51.781°N 0.095°E
- Grid reference: TL446112
- Manager: Greater Anglia
- Platforms: 4

Other information
- Station code: HWN
- Classification: DfT category C1

History
- Opened: 1842

Passengers
- 2020/21: ▼0.527 million
- 2021/22: ▲1.313 million
- 2022/23: ▲1.546 million
- 2023/24: ▲1.818 million
- 2024/25: ▲1.847 million

Listed Building – Grade II
- Feature: Harlow Town Station including Platform Structures
- Designated: 25 November 1995
- Reference no.: 1117351
Location
Notes
- Passenger statistics from the Office of Rail and Road

Harlow Town railway station is on the West Anglia Main Line serving the town of Harlow in Essex, England. It is 22 miles 59 chains (36.6 km) down the line from London Liverpool Street and is situated between Roydon and Harlow Mill stations. Its three-letter station code is HWN.

The station and all trains serving it are operated by Greater Anglia.

== History ==
The station was opened in 1842 as Burnt Mill, to serve the small village of the same name.

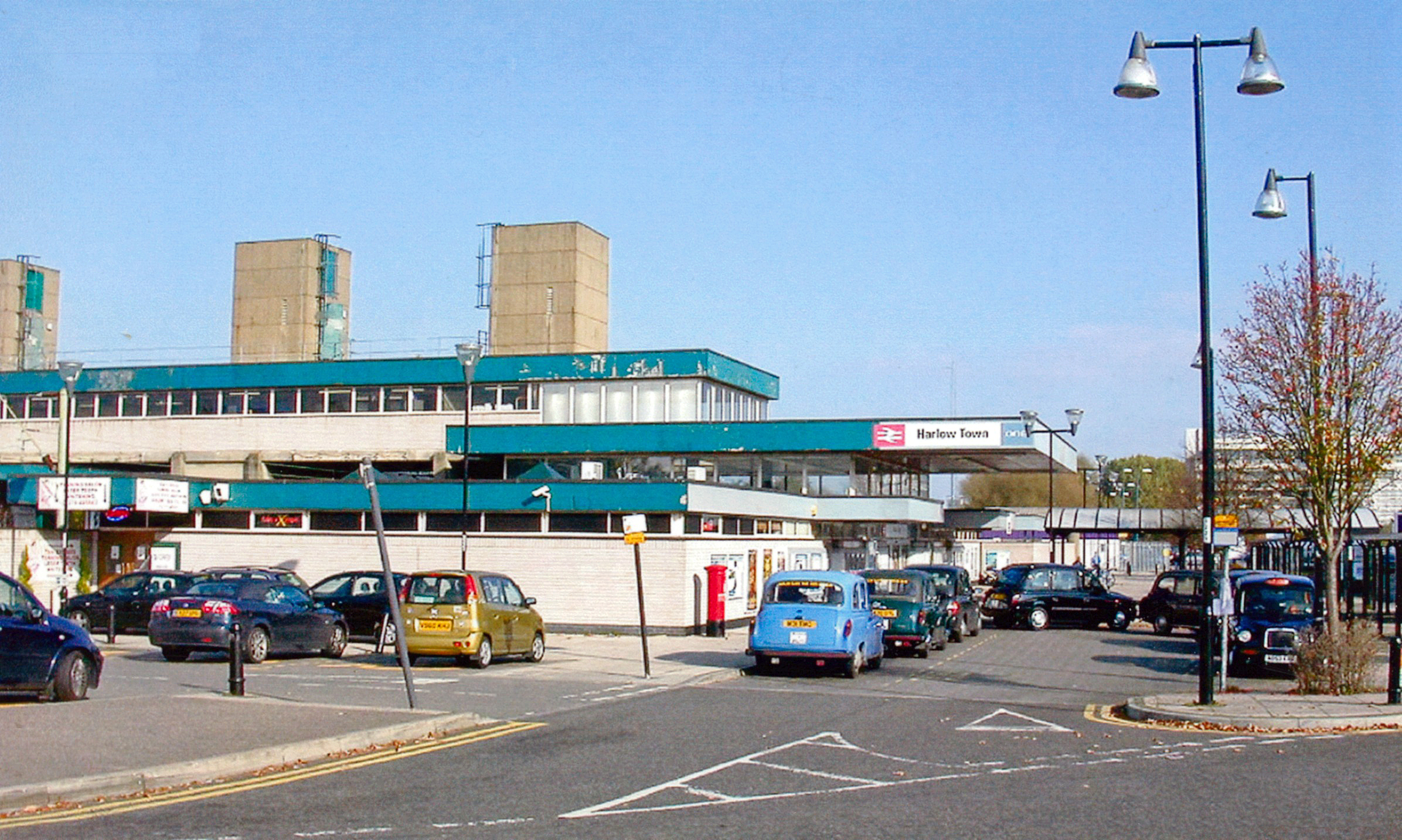
The station building in 2007

Between March 1959 and July 1960 the station was rebuilt to serve the post-war new town of Harlow, to designs by Paul Hamilton with John Bicknell and Ian Fraser of the British Railways (Eastern Region) architects department (chief architect: H. H. Powell). Described by Pevsner as "low, crisp and entirely ungimmicky", its architectural quality was recognised in 1996 when it was made a Grade II listed building. The listing entry states "the Eastern Region Architect's Department was the most creative branch of British Railways, designing a number of powerful modern stations in conjunction with the Region's electrification. The new station for Harlow New Town was the flagship of this achievement. It is a building with powerful spatial qualities, of especial interest particularly for its architectural design".

The Architect and Building News in 1959 said the architects have aimed at expressing the beauty of continuous surfaces of natural materials and paintwork has been reduced to a minimum.

On 13 July 1960, the station was renamed Harlow Town. Its status as a listed building has meant that alterations to conform with the Disability Discrimination Act have had to be carried out sensitively to protect the original architectural conception.

== Services ==
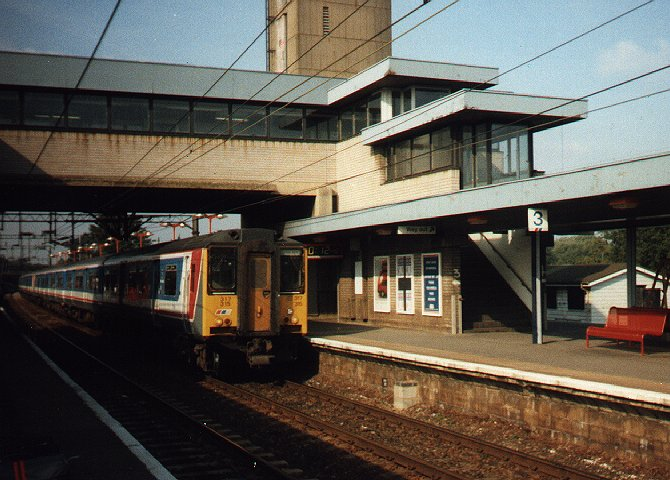
A Network SouthEast Class 317 at Harlow Town in the mid-1990s

All services at Harlow Town are operated by Greater Anglia (including some services which operate under the Stansted Express brand). Services are operated using Class 720 and 745 EMUs.

The typical off-peak service in trains per hour (tph) is:

- 4 tph to London Liverpool Street (2 of these are fast Stansted Express services and 2 are semi-fast services)
- 2 tph to Stratford (1 stopping, 1 semi fast)
- 2 tph to Bishop's Stortford
- 2 tph to Stansted Airport
- 2 tph to Cambridge North (1 semi-fast, 1 stopping)

During the peak hours, the station is served by an additional 2tph to/from Liverpool Street and Stansted Airport, as well as a small number of services to and from Ely.

On Sundays, the services between Stratford and Bishop's Stortford do not run.

Preceding station	National Rail	Following station
Roydon or Broxbourne	Greater Anglia West Anglia Main Line	Harlow Mill or Sawbridgeworth
Tottenham Hale	Stansted Express Stansted_Express	Stansted Airport

== The station today ==
The station has four platforms. Platform 2 is for services towards London Liverpool Street and Stratford. Platform 3 is for services towards Stansted Airport and Cambridge. Platforms 1 and 4 are used less frequently for slow trains and as a waiting loop for freight trains from the aggregate terminal a mile down the line, they are however used by a number of peak starting/terminating services to/from Liverpool Street or Stratford and by a few through trains northbound and southbound. Currently all platforms accommodate 12 car trains.

In December 2009 ticket barriers were installed at the station, to help reduce fare evasion from the station.
