= Sawbridgeworth railway station =

Railway station in Hertfordshire, England

Sawbridgeworth
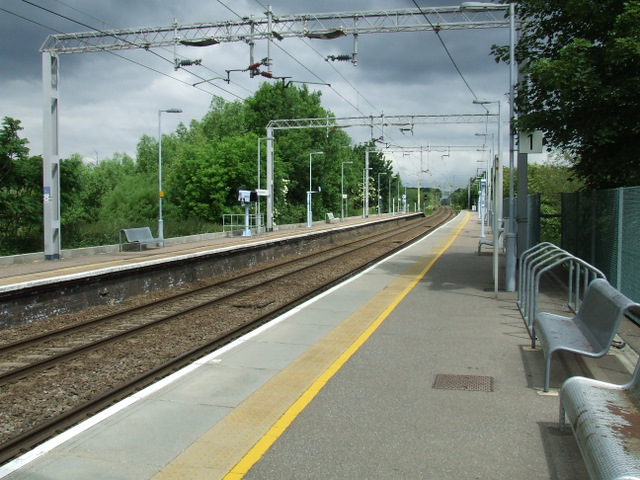
- Sawbridgeworth railway station in 2010

General information
- Location: Sawbridgeworth, East Hertfordshire; England
- Coordinates: 51.814°N 0.16°E
- Grid reference: TL490150
- Owner: Network Rail
- Manager: Greater Anglia
- Platforms: 2

Other information
- Station code: SAW
- Classification: DfT category E

History
- Opened: 1842

Passengers
- 2020/21: ▼0.105 million
- 2021/22: ▲0.293 million
- 2022/23: ▲0.354 million
- 2023/24: ▲0.428 million
- 2024/25: ▲0.471 million
Location
Notes
- Passenger statistics from the Office of Rail and Road

Sawbridgeworth railway station is on the West Anglia Main Line serving the town of Sawbridgeworth in Hertfordshire, England. It is 26 miles 57 chains (43.0 km) down the line from London Liverpool Street and is situated between Harlow Mill and Bishop's Stortford stations. Its three-letter station code is SAW.

The waiting room was added in 1960 by H. H. Powell of the British Railways Eastern Region Architect's Department with H. E. Green as the Project Architect. The ticket office was added in 1972 by S. Hardy with Project Architect P. H. Thomas.

The station and all trains serving it are operated by Greater Anglia. Both platforms were extended to accommodate 12-coach trains in 2011.

The station adjoins Lower Sheering in neighbouring Essex, and part of the station was previously in Essex.

== Services ==
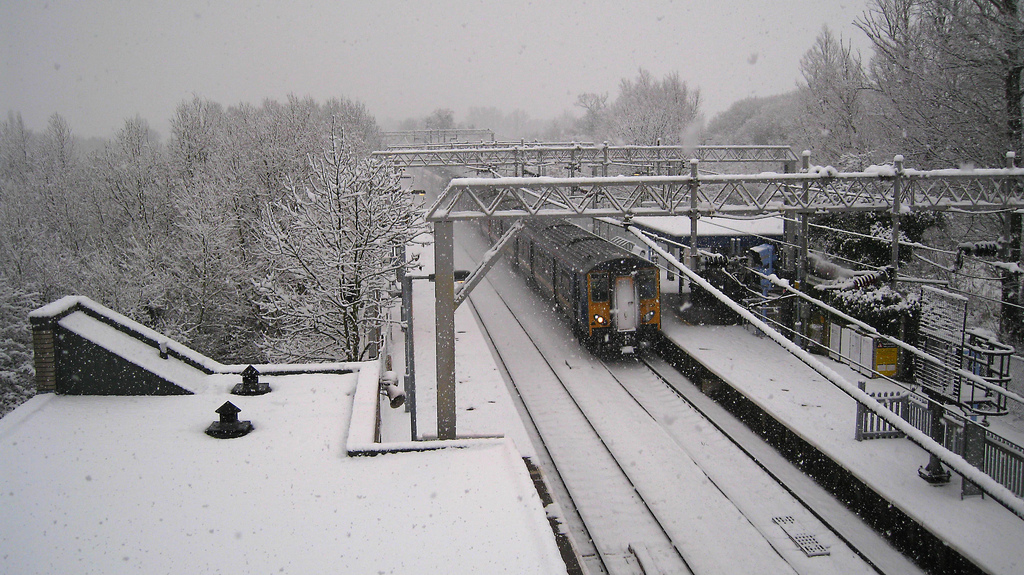
During the snow of January 2010

All services at Sawbridgeworth are operated by Greater Anglia using Class 720 EMUs.

The typical off-peak service in trains per hour is:

- 1 tph to London Liverpool Street
- 2 tph to Stratford
- 2 tph to Bishop's Stortford
- 1 tph to Cambridge North

During the peak hours, the Cambridge North service doubles to 2tph and runs to Cambridge only. Some services also continue to Ely.

Additionally, a small number of Stansted Express services serve the station during peak hours only.

On Sundays, the station is served by a half-hourly service between London Liverpool Street and Cambridge North.

| Preceding station | National Rail | Following station |
|---|---|---|
| Harlow Mill or Harlow Town | Greater Anglia West Anglia Main Line | Bishop's Stortford |

== Level crossing ==
The level crossing to the south of the station is manually operated, like the signals at Liverpool Street Panel (L).

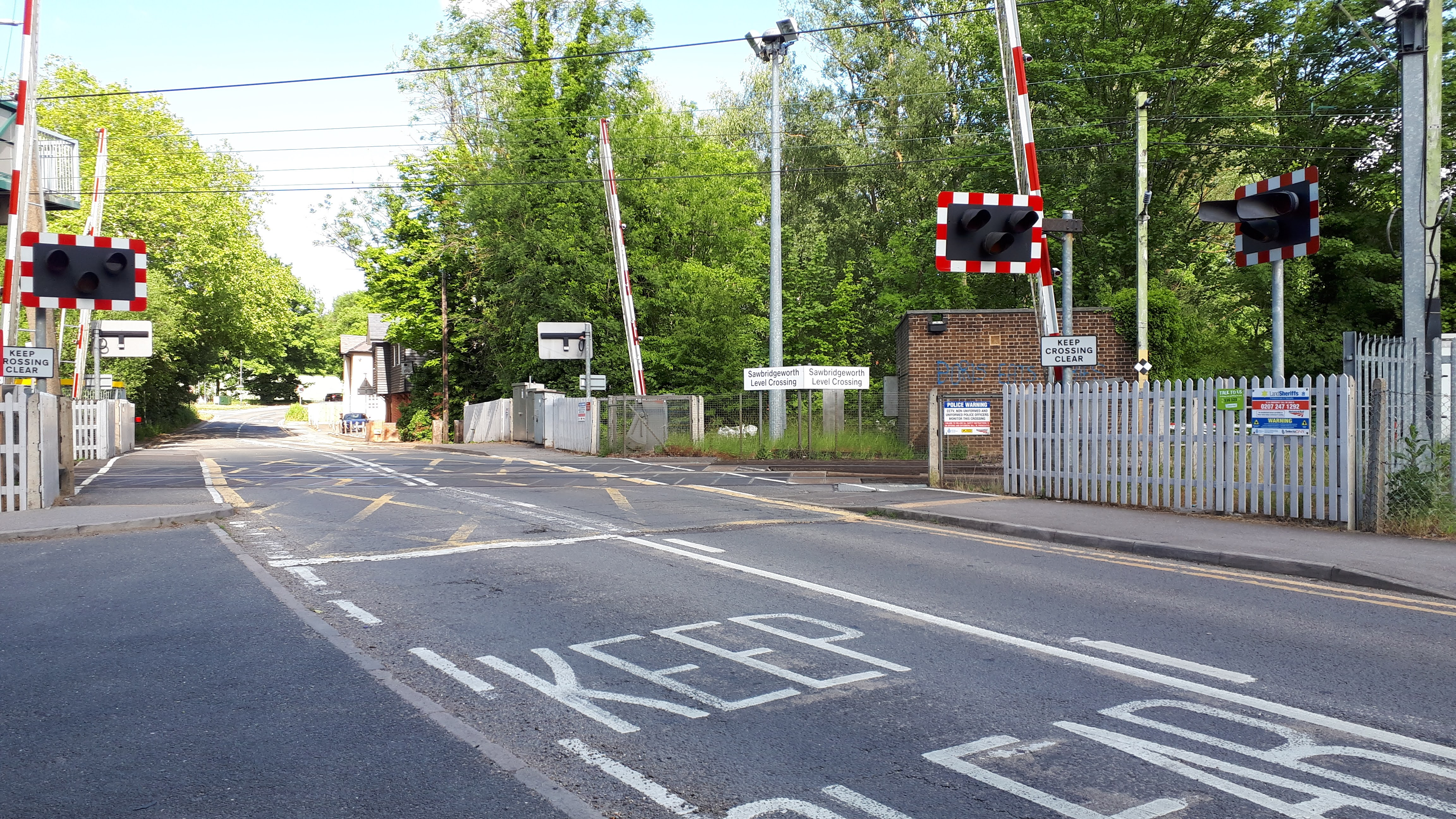
Sawbridgeworth Level Crossing
