= Sawbridgeworth =

Town in Hertfordshire, England

Coordinates: 51.814°N 0.150°E

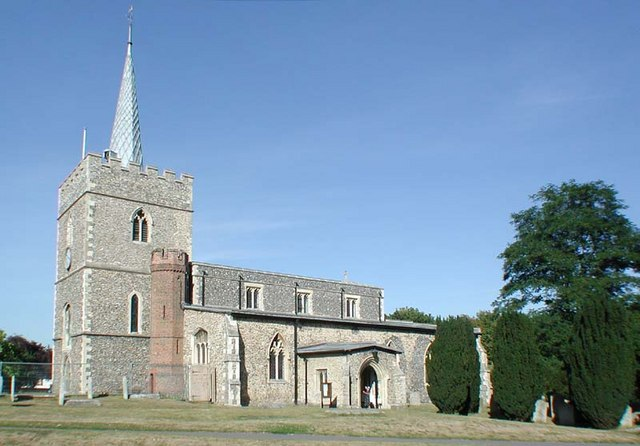
- St Mary the Great, Sawbridgeworth

- Location within Hertfordshire
- Population: 8,742 (Parish, 2021); 10,475 (Built-up area, 2021)
- OS grid reference: TL481151
- Civil parish: Sawbridgeworth
- District: East Hertfordshire
- Shire county: Hertfordshire
- Region: East
- Country: England
- Sovereign state: United Kingdom
- Post town: Sawbridgeworth
- Postcode district: CM21
- Dialling code: 01279
- Police: Hertfordshire
- Fire: Hertfordshire
- Ambulance: East of England
- UK Parliament: Hertford and Stortford

Sawbridgeworth (/ˈsɔːbrɪdʒwɜːrθ/ SAW-brij-wurth, historically /ˈsæpswəθ/ SAPS-wəth or /-səθ/ SAPS-əth) is a town and civil parish in the East Hertfordshire district of Hertfordshire, England. It lies 10 miles (16 km) east of the county town of Hertford, in between the towns of Bishop's Stortford to the north and Harlow to the south. The town is on the west bank of the River Stort, which forms the county boundary with Essex.

As well as the town itself, the parish also covers surrounding rural areas, particularly to the north and south of the town, including the hamlet of Spellbrook. At the 2021 census, the parish had a population of 8,742, and the Sawbridgeworth built-up area as defined by the Office for National Statistics, which extends beyond the parish boundary to include the Lower Sheering area, had a population of 10,475.

== History ==
The name Sawbridgeworth derives from the Old English Saebeorhtsworð meaning the enclosure belonging to someone called Saebeorht.

The manor of "Sabrixteworde" (one of the many spellings previously associated with the town) was recorded in the Domesday Book of 1086. After the Battle of Hastings it was granted to Geoffrey de Mandeville by William the Conqueror. Local notables have included John Leventhorpe, an executor of both King Henry IV and King Henry V's wills, and Anne Boleyn, who was given the Pishiobury/Pishobury estate, located to the south of the town.

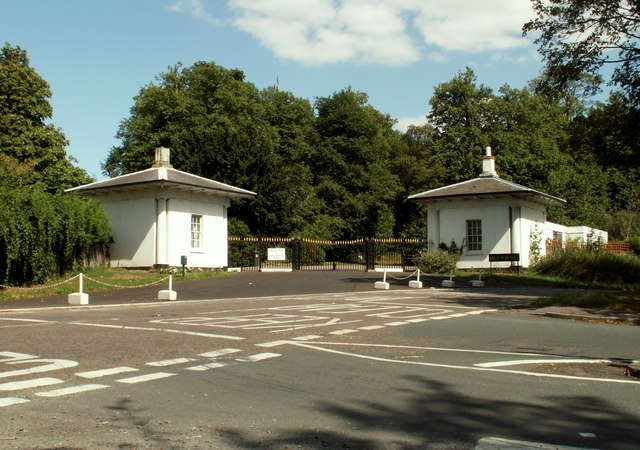
Entrance to Great Hyde Hall; it was known simply as Hyde Hall when it was held by the Jocelyn family in the 16th and 17th centuries

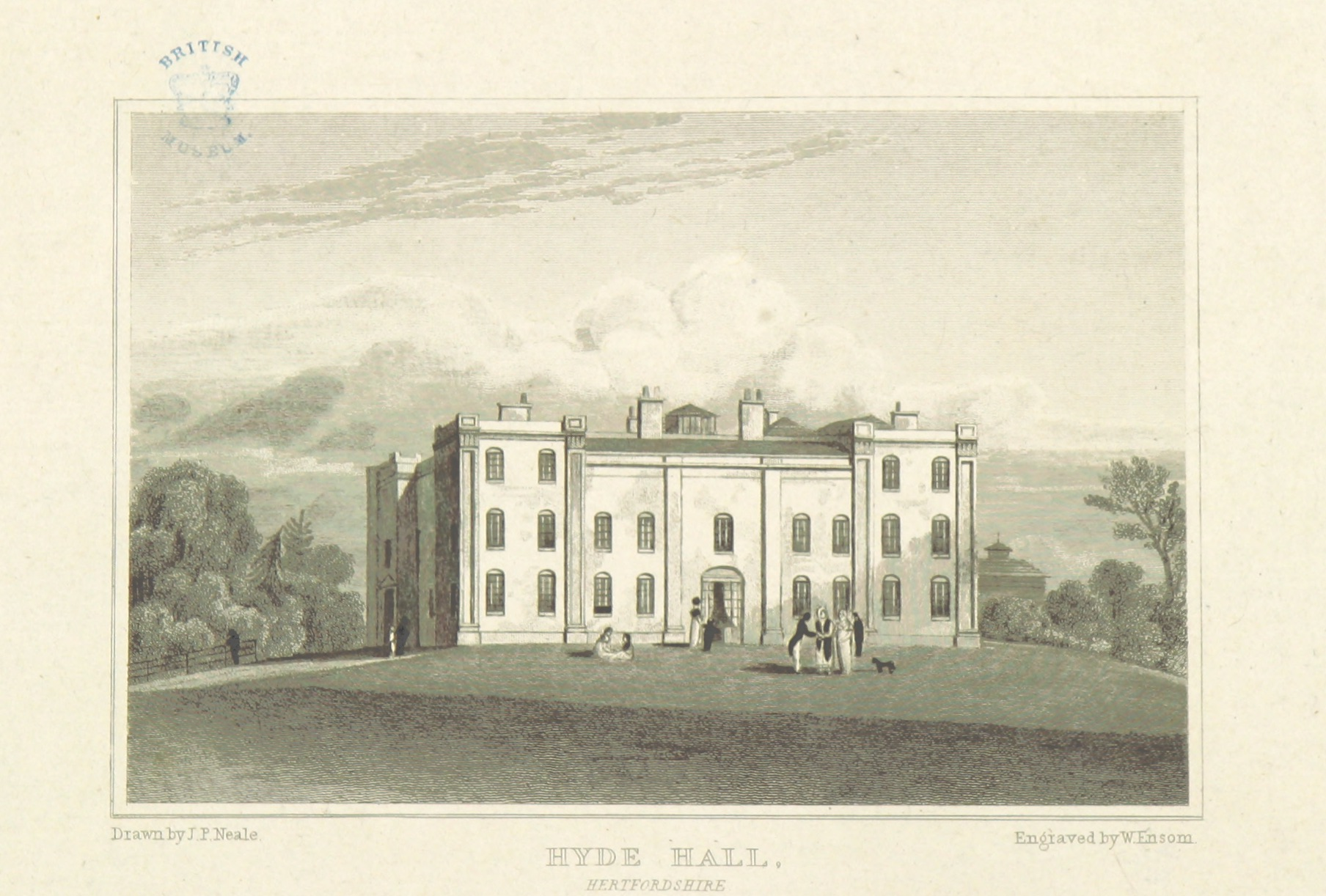
Print of Hyde Hall (1818) by J. P. Neale

The Great Hyde Hall mansion and surrounding land was acquired by Sir Walter Lawrence, the master builder, in the 1920s. In 1934, he instituted the Walter Lawrence Trophy for the fastest century in county cricket. He built a cricket ground and pavilion in the grounds where the great and the good of the cricket world came to play against Sir Walter's home team, which often included his three sons: Jim, Guy and Pat. Sir Walter also had two daughters: Molly and Gipsy. Great Hyde Hall was sold in 1945 and became a school. It is a Grade II* listed building and has now been divided into housing.

There are numerous buildings date from the Tudor, Stuart and Georgian periods in the town centre, much of which was designated a conservation area in 1968.

Great St Mary's Church is a Grade I listed building; "of special interest as a substantially unaltered large medieval parish church, typical of the Hertfordshire type, and with an outstanding collection of memorials of the highest artistic quality". It was built in the 13th century (although a church on the site existed in Saxon times) and includes a Tudor tower containing a clock bell (1664) and eight ringing bells, the oldest of which dates from 1749. It is thought to be called 'Great' St Mary's to distinguish it from St Mary's, Gilston. Ralph Jocelyn of Hyde Hall, who was Lord Mayor of London in 1464 and in 1476, is buried here; images of many of his family and other locals have been engraved on brass, and the church is popular for enthusiasts of brass rubbing. The ghost of Sir John Jocelyn, known for his love of horses, is reputed to appear riding a white horse on the old carriage drive every 1 November.

The town's prosperity came from the maltings, some of which now house antiques centres. Among the maltsters were George Fawbert and John Barnard; in 1839 they set up the Fawbert and Barnard charity to fund local children and their education, funding a local infant school that still exists today.

By the time of the Norman conquest, or soon after, Sawbridgeworth's rich farming land was fully developed for cultivation as was possible with the means available at the time: it was the richest village community in the county. Many important medieval families had estates here. The land was divided among them, into a number of manors or distinct estates; the lord of each manor had rights not only over this land but also over the people who farmed it. The number of manors increased during the Middle Ages, by a process of subinfeudation, that is the granting out of a part of an existing manor to a new owner so that the new manor was created. Many manors sprang from the original Domesday Book holding of the de Mandeville family. The first came to be called Sayesbury manor, from the de Say family who inherited it from the de Mandevilles in 1189. The many important people who held these manors built themselves houses with hunting parks around them; when they died their tombs enriched the parish church, so that today St Mary's has one of the finest collections of church monuments in the country. The town was also the seat of the Earl of Roden Jocelyn family.

Sawbridgeworth railway station opened in 1841 on the Northern and Eastern Railway.

During the Second World War RAF Sawbridgeworth was built to the north-west of the town (in the neighbouring parish of High Wych). Supermarine Spitfires, Westland Lysanders, North American Mustangs and de Havilland Mosquito operated from the airfield, among other types - for a complete history of the airfield, see the book Where the Lysanders were ....., by Paul Doyle, published in 1995 by Forward Airfield Research Publishing. The Walter Lawrence & Son Ltd joinery works, located in Lower Sheering, between the canal and the railway, built over 1,000 Mosquito fuselage shells and wing skins for de Havilland during the Second World War. Subsequently, it reverted to making joinery and doors for the building trade. The joinery works was closed in about 1982 and Lawrence Moorings flats complex was built on the site.

Sawbridgeworth was the birthplace of composer Bernard Rose (1916–1996) and the actor Stephen Greif (1944–2022).

Sawbridgeworth has been twinned with Bry-sur-Marne in France since 1973, and Moosburg an der Isar in Germany since 2018.

== Governance ==
There are three tiers of local government covering Sawbridgeworth, at parish (town), district, and county level: Sawbridgeworth Town Council, East Hertfordshire District Council, and Hertfordshire County Council. The town council is based at Sayesbury Manor on Bell Street.

For national elections, Sawbridgeworth forms part of the Hertford and Stortford constituency.

=== Administrative history ===
Sawbridgeworth was an ancient parish in the Braughing Hundred of Hertfordshire.

From 1835, the parish was included in the Bishop's Stortford Poor Law Union, a group of parishes which collectively administered their responsibilities under the poor laws. It therefore became part of the Bishop's Stortford Rural Sanitary District in 1872. When elected parish and district councils were established under the Local Government Act 1894, Sawbridgeworth was given a parish council and included in the Hadham Rural District, which covered the parts of the Bishop's Stortford Rural Sanitary District that were in Hertfordshire.

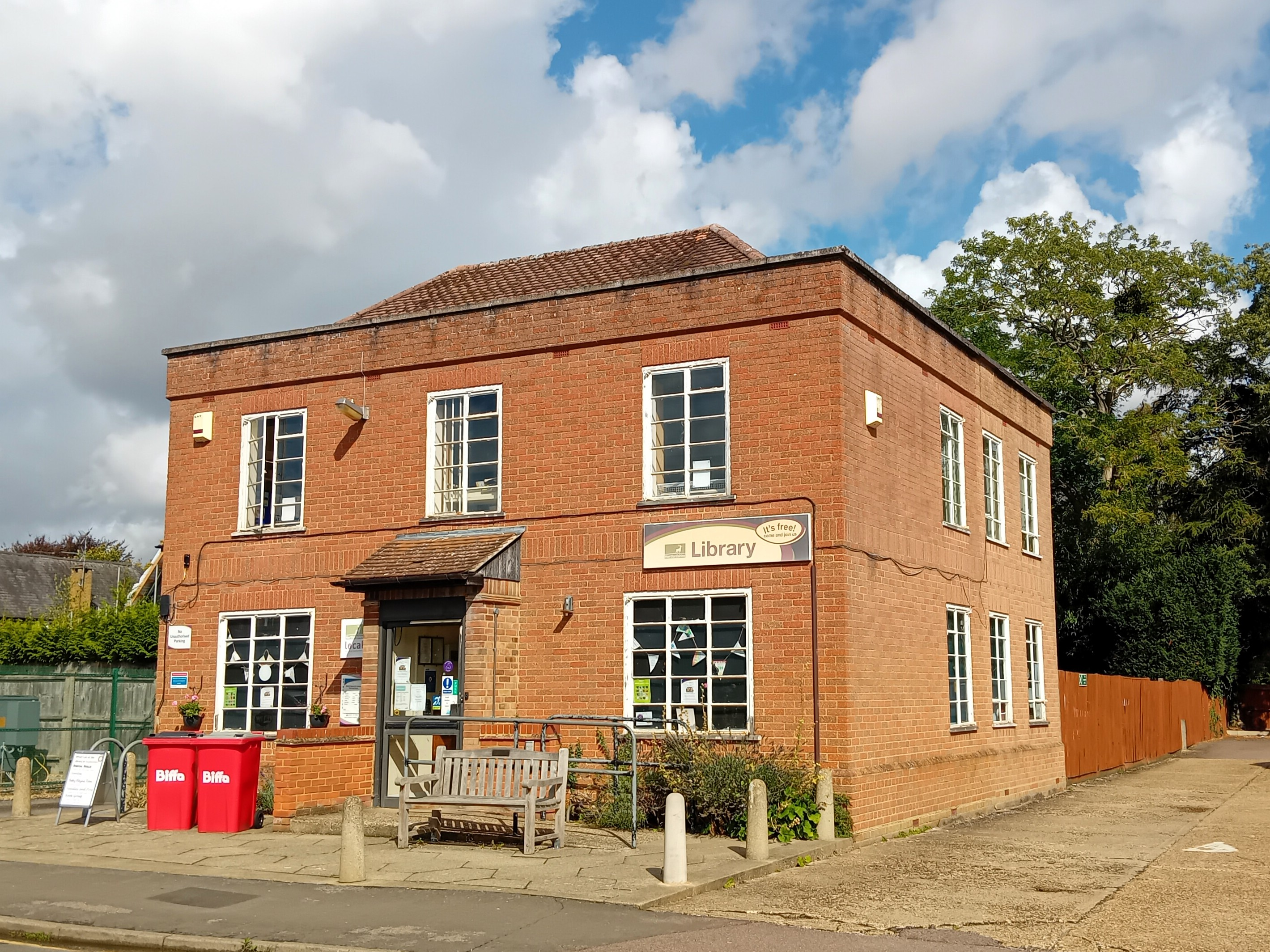
Sawbridgeworth Library, The Forebury: Built in 1937 as headquarters of Sawbridgeworth Urban District Council, now serves as the town's library

In 1901, Sawbridgeworth was made a separate urban district, removing it from the Hadham Rural District. It was decided that the whole parish of Sawbridgeworth was not suitable for becoming an urban district, and so the more rural western part of the parish was made a separate civil parish called High Wych, which remained in the Hadham Rural District, and the reduced parish of Sawbridgeworth was converted into an urban district with effect from 1 April 1901.

Until 1914 Sawbridgeworth Urban District Council met at offices on Bell Street (sometimes called Cock Street). In 1914 the council moved to the upper floor of the town's fire station at 5 Church Street, which had been built in 1905. In 1937 the council built itself new offices on The Forebury, holding its first meeting in the new building on 5 July 1937.

Sawbridgeworth Urban District was abolished in 1974 under the Local Government Act 1972, when district-level functions passed to the new East Hertfordshire District Council. A successor parish called Sawbridgeworth was created covering the former urban district, with its parish council taking the name Sawbridgeworth Town Council.

Coat of arms, granted 1962

Sawbridgeworth Urban District Council had been granted a coat of arms on 20 July 1962. The arms were transferred to the new town council in 1974.

=== Fire service ===
The town has an on-call fire station, in Station Road, with one fire engine. Sawbridgeworth had its own fire brigade from 1897 until it was merged into the National Fire Service in 1941. In 1948 control of the local fire brigade passed to the Hertfordshire Fire Brigade, since renamed the Hertfordshire Fire and Rescue Service, run by Hertfordshire County Council.

== Geography ==
Sawbridgeworth adjoins the border between Hertfordshire and Essex. The village of Lower Sheering is across the county boundary into Essex, and adjoins Sawbridgeworth along its eastern edge, east of the railway station and of the River Stort. It has a Sawbridgeworth CM21 postal code, but is in the Epping Forest District of Essex. Lower Sheering is classed as part of the Sawbridgeworth built-up area by the Office for National Statistics.

== Geology ==
Underlying the town at some depth is the London Clay stratum, with a thick layer of Boulder clay laid down during the ice ages, including the Anglian. The soil on top of this is a loam, with glacial erratics of Hertfordshire puddingstone conglomerate found around the town.

== Education ==
Sawbridgeworth has a secondary school, the Leventhorpe Academy, which had a public swimming pool and leisure centre until its closure at the end of 2024. Sawbridgeworth has two primary schools, Reedings and Mandeville, and one infant school, Fawbert & Barnard.

== Media ==
Sawbridgeworth is within the BBC London and ITV London region. Television signals are received from the Crystal Palace TV transmitter, BBC East and ITV Anglia can also be received from the Sandy Heath transmitter.

Local radio stations are BBC Three Counties Radio, Heart Hertfordshire and East Herts Radio, a community-based station.

The town is served by the local newspapers, Bishop's Stortford Independent and Hertfordshire Mercury.

== Sport ==
Sawbridgeworth Town FC, a non-league football club, was established in 1897. The Men's 1st Team currently play in the Spartan South Midlands League, step five of the English non-league system. Home matches are played at Crofters End, Sawbridgeworth.

Sawbridgeworth Cricket Club field three senior sides on a Saturday and seven colts sides, from ages nine to fifteen. The 1st XI plays in the Hertfordshire Cricket League. The main ground is Town Fields, situated behind Bell Street. The second ground is at Leventhorpe Academy.

Sawbridgeworth has tennis and bowls clubs.

== Local groups ==
Sawbridgeworth is home to 309 Squadron of the Air Training Corps. Additionally, the 1st Sawbridgeworth Scout Group, which was established in 1908, is located in the town.

== Transport ==
The A1184 road runs through the town. The River Stort Navigation flows north–south along the eastern edge of the town, parallel to the railway, and past the Maltings.

The town is served by Sawbridgeworth railway station, located on the West Anglia Main Line between London Liverpool Street and Cambridge. The station and all trains serving it are operated by Greater Anglia.

There are bus services to Harlow, Bishops Stortford, and Stansted Airport, operated by Arriva Herts & Essex.

The Stort Navigation is the canalised section of the River Stort running 22 kilometres (14 mi) from the town of Bishop's Stortford, through Sawbridgeworth, downstream to its confluence with the Lee Navigation.

== See also ==
- Sawbridgeworth Marsh SSSI
- The Hundred Parishes

=== Nearby villages ===
- High Wych
- Spellbrook
- Much Hadham

== Notable people ==
- Rowland Alston (1782–1865), MP for Hertfordshire from 1835 to 1841.
- Alexander Annesley (c. 1753 - 1813), lawyer
- David Beckham (1975-), former England captain, and singer Victoria Beckham (1974-) lived in Rowneybury House.
- Anne Boleyn (c. 1501 - 1536), second wife of King Henry VIII, held Pishiobury until her execution.
- Robert Jocelyn, 1st Viscount Jocelyn (c.1688-1756), Lord Chancellor of Ireland; he was a member of the Jocelyn family of Hyde Hall.
- Pip Pyle (1950-2006), progressive rock drummer, particularly of Canterbury scene bands.
- Thomas Rivers (1797-1878), nurseryman.
- Elizabeth Rivers (1903-1964), artist.
- Frank Silcock (1838-1897), first-class cricketer and founding member of Essex County Cricket Club.
- John Stanier (British Army officer), Chief of the General Staff of the British Army from 1982 to 1985.
- George Horace Brooke Thompson (1928–2025), also known as Robin Thompson, physicist specialising in semiconductor lasers, lived in Sawbridgeworth for more than 50 years.
- Christine Walkden, television presenter and gardener.
