= Bishop's Stortford railway station =

Railway station in Hertfordshire, England

Bishop's Stortford
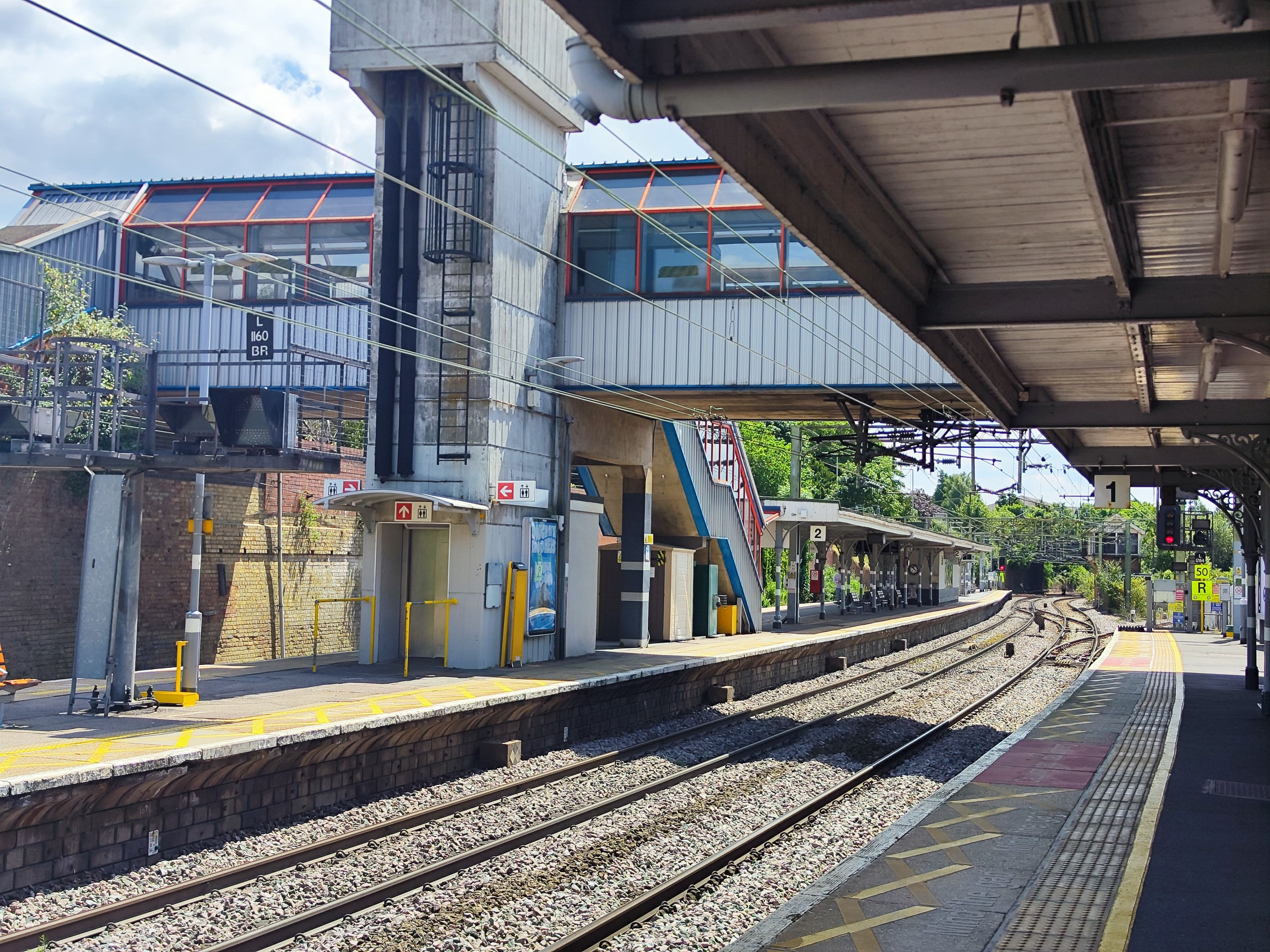

General information
- Location: Bishop's Stortford, District of East Hertfordshire, England
- Coordinates: 51.867°N 0.165°E
- Grid reference: TL491208
- Manager: Greater Anglia
- Platforms: 3

Other information
- Station code: BIS
- Classification: DfT category C2

History
- Original company: Northern and Eastern Railway
- Pre-grouping: Great Eastern Railway
- Post-grouping: London and North Eastern Railway

Key dates
- 16 May 1842: Station opened

Passengers
- 2020/21: ▼0.712 million
- Interchange: ▼9,698
- 2021/22: ▲2.004 million
- Interchange: ▲34,895
- 2022/23: ▲2.363 million
- Interchange: ▲71,988
- 2023/24: ▲2.806 million
- Interchange: ▲0.103 million
- 2024/25: ▲3.003 million
- Interchange: ▲0.124 million
Location
Notes
- Passenger statistics from the Office of Rail and Road

Bishop's Stortford railway station is on the West Anglia Main Line serving the town of Bishop's Stortford, in Hertfordshire, England. It is 30 miles 27 chains (48.8 km) down the line from London Liverpool Street, and is situated between Sawbridgeworth and Stansted Mountfitchet stations. The station and all trains serving it are operated by Greater Anglia, including the half-hourly Stansted Express service.

== History ==
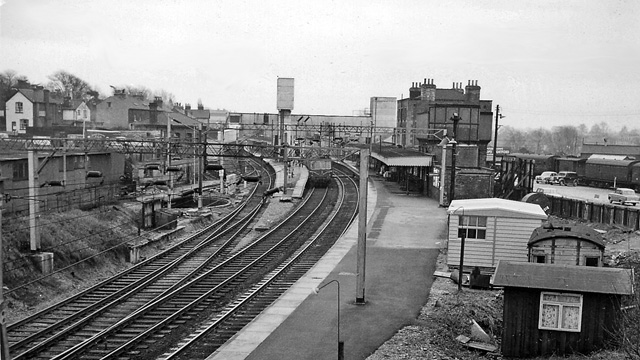
The station in 1961

The station was opened by the Northern and Eastern Railway as a temporary terminus on 16 May 1842; it became a through station on 30 July 1845 when the line was extended through to Norwich Victoria.

In 1843, the train from London to Bishop's Stortford was timetabled to run at 36 miles per hour (58 km/h), exclusive of stops; this was the fastest booked run on any English railway at the time.

The station site included a large goods yard occupying the land formerly used for car parking to the west, now a housing development, as well as sidings running as far west as the riverside wharves of the Stort Navigation. To the east, a small turntable and engine sheds lay on land recently used as a garage and (as of 2012) earmarked for supermarket use. During the station's heyday, the station had two signal boxes: South, located opposite the current building and behind platform 3, and North, controlling access to the Bishop's Stortford–Braintree branch line.

For most of the station's life, four lines passed through it, as opposed to the current three lines. There were up and down main lines, to the west of the now much extended island platform, with a branch line and passing loop (with access to turntable) to the east of the island platform; the northern end of which was located where the footbridge is today.

Bishop's Stortford was also a junction station for the cross-country route to Dunmow and Braintree, which opened to passengers on 22 February 1869 and closed on 3 March 1952. The line continued in use for goods trains and occasional excursions, closing in stages with the final section to Easton Lodge closing on 17 February 1972.

The station was the scene of a fatal crash on the last full day of the General Strike of 1926, when a southbound goods train operated by a volunteer crew crashed into the rear of an earlier train sitting in platform two. The platform canopy was demolished and a waiting passenger was killed.

== Facilities and layout ==
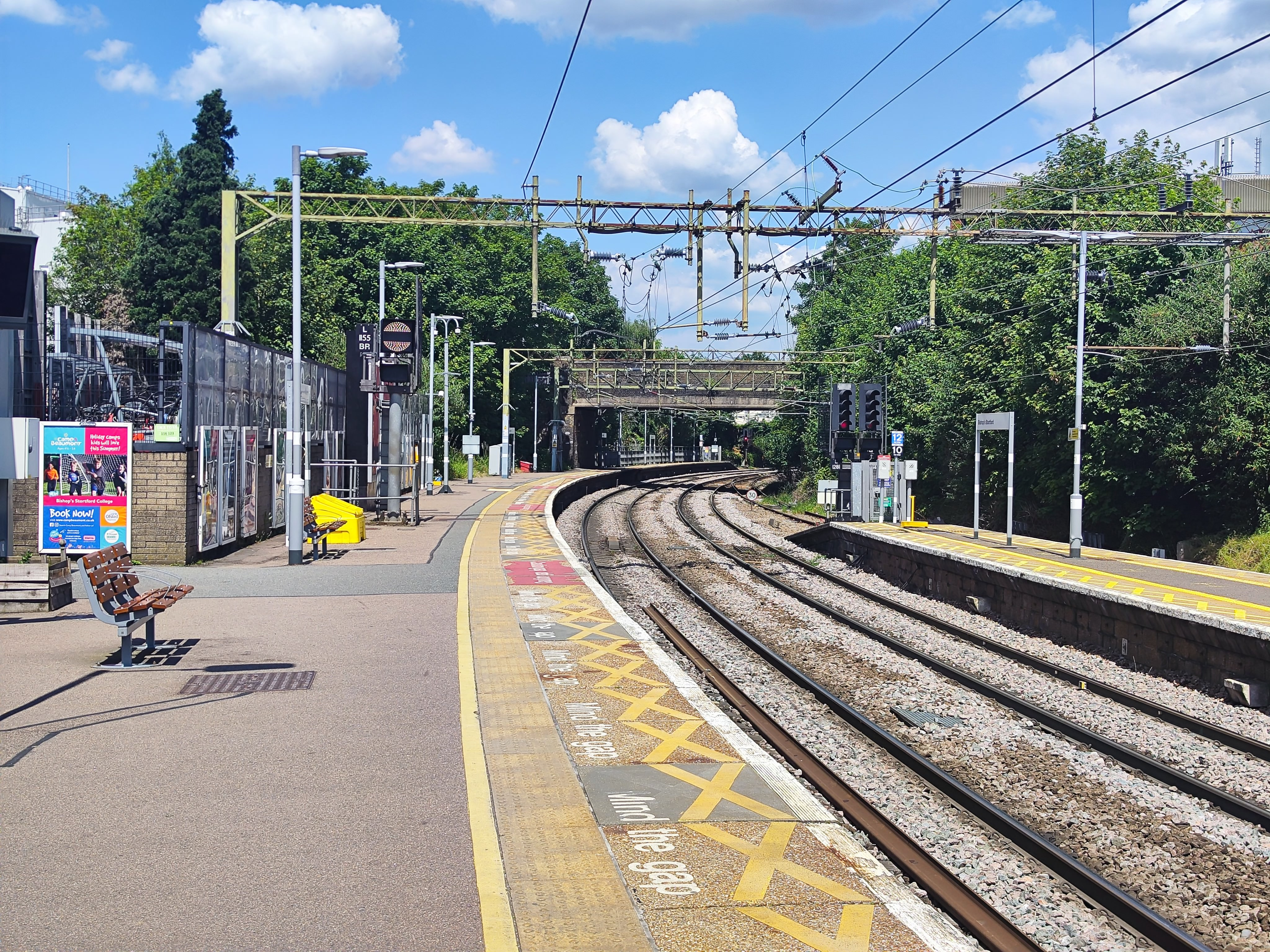
The station, facing north

The station has three platforms:

1. for services towards Stansted Airport and Cambridge
2. used for services to London Liverpool Street
3. a terminal platform, used for services between Stratford and Bishop's Stortford. It is also used by a few services to/from Cambridge via Stansted Airport which start/terminate here.

The station has two entrances: one from Station Road where there is ticket hall, waiting room and passenger information; the other entrance is for direct access to platforms 2 and 3. Ticket barriers have been installed at the station to prevent fare evasion.

In 2014, the station underwent extensive modernisation; this resulted in the construction of a new ticket office, barrier line, retail outlets and a new platform canopy.

== Services ==
The typical off-peak service in trains per hour (tph) is:

- 4 tph to London Liverpool Street; of which:
  - 2 call at Tottenham Hale only (Stansted Express)
  - 1 calls at Harlow Town, Broxbourne, Cheshunt and Tottenham Hale
  - 1 calls at Sawbridgeworth, Harlow Mill, Harlow Town, Broxbourne, Cheshunt and Tottenham Hale
- 2 tph to Stratford; of which:
  - 1 calls at Sawbridgeworth, Harlow Mill, Harlow Town, Roydon, Broxbourne, Cheshunt, Waltham Cross, Enfield Lock, Northumberland Park, Tottenham Hale and Lea Bridge.
  - 1 calls at Sawbridgeworth, Harlow Town, Roydon, Broxbourne, Cheshunt, Tottenham Hale and Lea Bridge
- 2 tph to Stansted Airport, running non-stop (Stansted Express)
- 2 tph to Cambridge North; of which:
  - 1 calls at Audley End, Whittlesford Parkway and Cambridge
  - 1 calls at Stansted Mountfitchet, Elsenham, Newport, Audley End, Great Chesterford, Whittlesford Parkway, Shelford and Cambridge.

On Sundays, this is reduced to:

- 4 tph to London Liverpool Street; of which:
  - 2 call at Tottenham Hale only
  - 1 call at Sawbridgeworth, Harlow Town, Broxbourne, Cheshunt and Tottenham Hale
  - 1 call at Sawbridgeworth, Harlow Mill, Harlow Town, Roydon, Broxbourne, Cheshunt, Tottenham Hale and Hackney Downs
- 2 tph to Stansted Airport, both running non-stop
- 2 tph to Cambridge; of which:
  - 1 calls at Audley End and Whittlesford Parkway
  - 1 calls at Stansted Mountfitchet, Elsenham, Newport, Audley End, Great Chesterford, Whittlesford Parkway and Shelford.

During peak hours, the station is served by an additional 2 tph between Liverpool Street and Cambridge/Ely. At other times, it is necessary to change at Cambridge for onward travel, using services provided by CrossCountry, East Midlands Railway or Great Northern; Great Northern services also serve King's Lynn.

Preceding station	National Rail	Following station
Sawbridgeworth	Greater Anglia; West Anglia Main Line	Stansted Mountfitchet
Harlow Town	Greater Anglia; Stansted Express	Stansted Mountfitchet
	Disused railways	
Terminus	Great Eastern Railway; Stortford–Braintree branch line	Hockerill Halt; Line and station closed
