= River Stort =

River in Essex and Hertfordshire, England

Stort
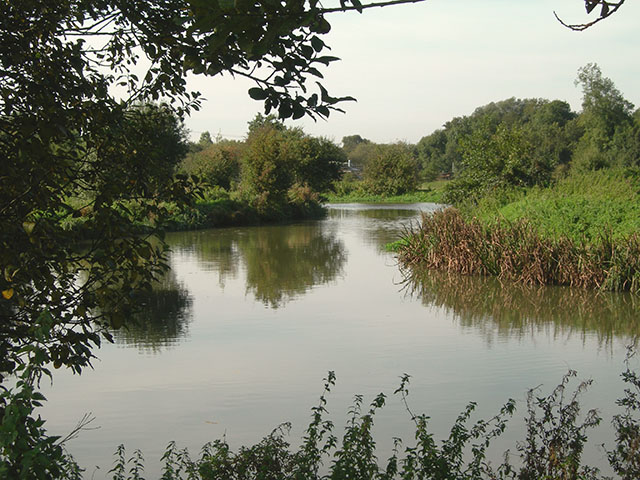
- The Stort above Harlow, Essex

Location
- Country: United Kingdom
- Region: Hertfordshire
- City: Bishop's Stortford

Physical characteristics
- Source
  - location: Near Langley, Essex, England
  - coordinates: 52.0027°N 0.0683°E
  - elevation: 130 m (430 ft)
- Mouth: River Lea
  - location: Near Hoddesdon, Hertfordshire
  - coordinates: 51.7644°N 0.0141°E
  - elevation: 28 m (92 ft)
- Length: 38 km (24 mi)

The River Stort is a chalk river in Essex and Hertfordshire, England. It is 24 miles (39 km) long and flows from near the village of Langley to the River Lea at Hoddesdon.

The river's name is a back-formation from the name of the town of Bishop's Stortford. The 16th-century cartographers Christopher Saxton and William Camden named it the Stort, assuming the town of Stortford was named for its ford. The river was originally called the Stour.

== Course ==
The Stort rises north of Langley in Hertfordshire, although north of Maunden it only flows in times of high rainfall. From Langley, the river flows in a generally southerly direction through the villages of Clavering and Manuden and the market town of Bishop's Stortford.

It then flows past Sawbridgeworth, before it changes direction and flows west past Harlow and Roydon. The Stort finally empties into the Lea at Feildes Weir, Hoddesdon.

== Stort Navigation ==
The Stort Navigation is the canalised section of the River Stort running 22 km (14 mi) from Bishop's Stortford to its confluence with the Lee Navigation. It has 15 locks.

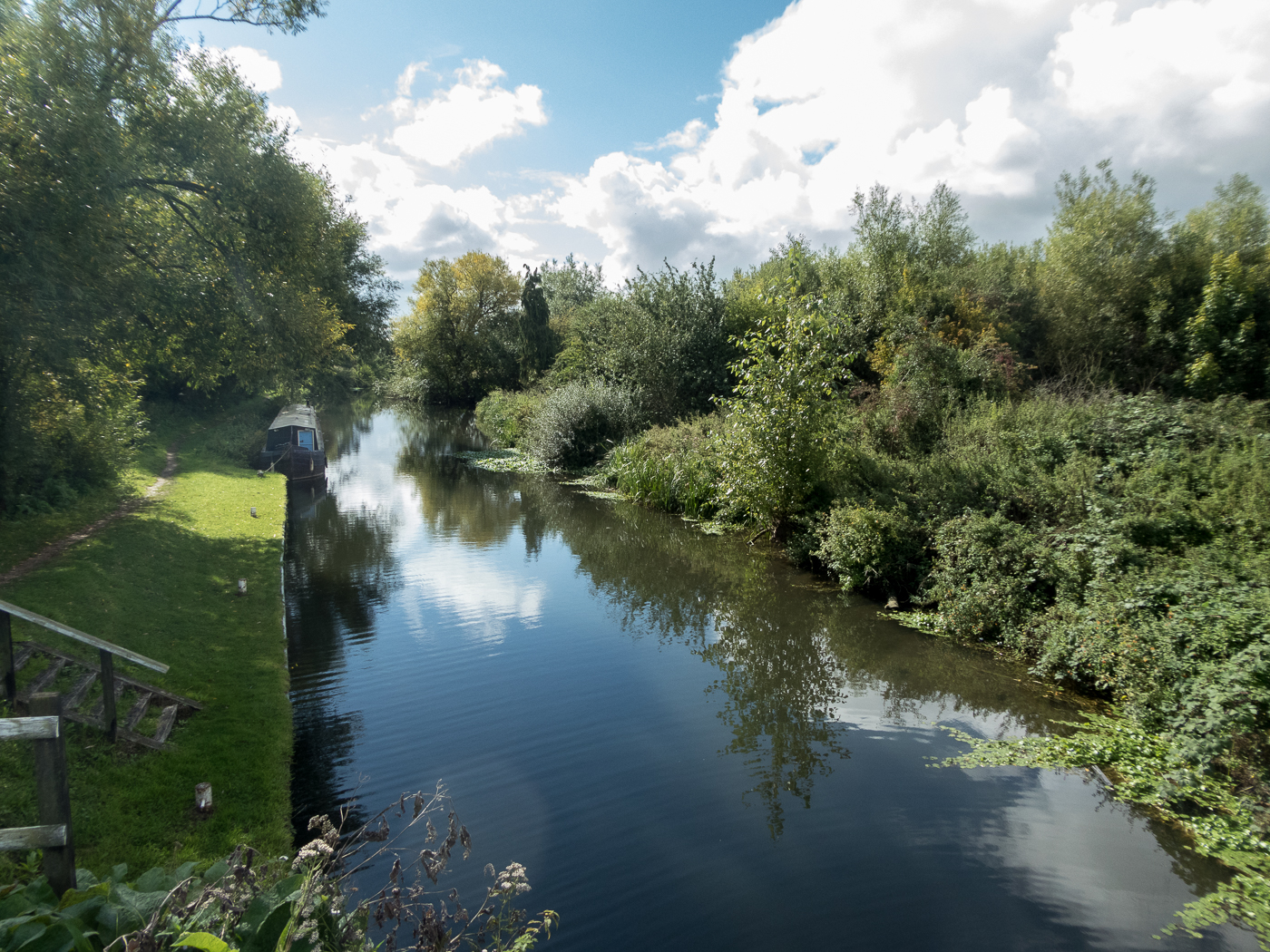
The Stort Navigation at Spellbrook in Essex
