= The Road Ahead: America's Creeping Revolution =

1949 book by John T. Flynn

- 1949 paperback edition
- Author: John T. Flynn
- Language: English
- Published: New York
- Publisher: Devin-Adair Company
- Publication date: September 1949
- Publication place: United States
- Pages: 160

The Road Ahead: America's Creeping Revolution is a 1949 book by American journalist John T. Flynn, that argues that socialism was infiltrating into the politics of the United States. The book has had at least three printings, totaling over 500,000 copies. Many of these were distributed by the Fighters For Freedom, a division of The Committee for Constitutional Government, Inc., based in New York City.

The book has no formal introduction. The author states at the bottom of the book jacket: "I wrote this book to answer a question that practically everybody is asking: Where are we heading? I thought it was about time for someone to answer it, candidly and with blunt facts". It continues with the statement that "...this country is traveling to its destruction". The book then describes events and political attitudes prevalent in post-World War II America that pointed, according to Flynn, to a shift toward socialism. This shift was being steered by the very political leaders of the day who were decrying communism in Europe on the one hand and expanding the tax burden on the American people to fight the emerging Cold War with Russia.

The book discusses the history of the rise of European socialism, beginning with the Marxist influence of the Fabian Society and nationalization of industry in England. Flynn then lists similar steps that were being taken or proposed in American politics, including the expansion of government to regulate almost every aspect of American life, elimination of the gold standard in favor of a fiat currency, the rise in tax rates to much higher levels, the burden on the Federal budget of a bloated welfare system, and "the offer of free health care".

Karl Schriftgiesser of The New York Times wrote that this book and Politics Has No Morals by Norman Beasley "are perhaps the most important books about the contemporary American scene that we will have this year".
