= Ulmus × hollandica 'Vegeta' =

Elm cultivar

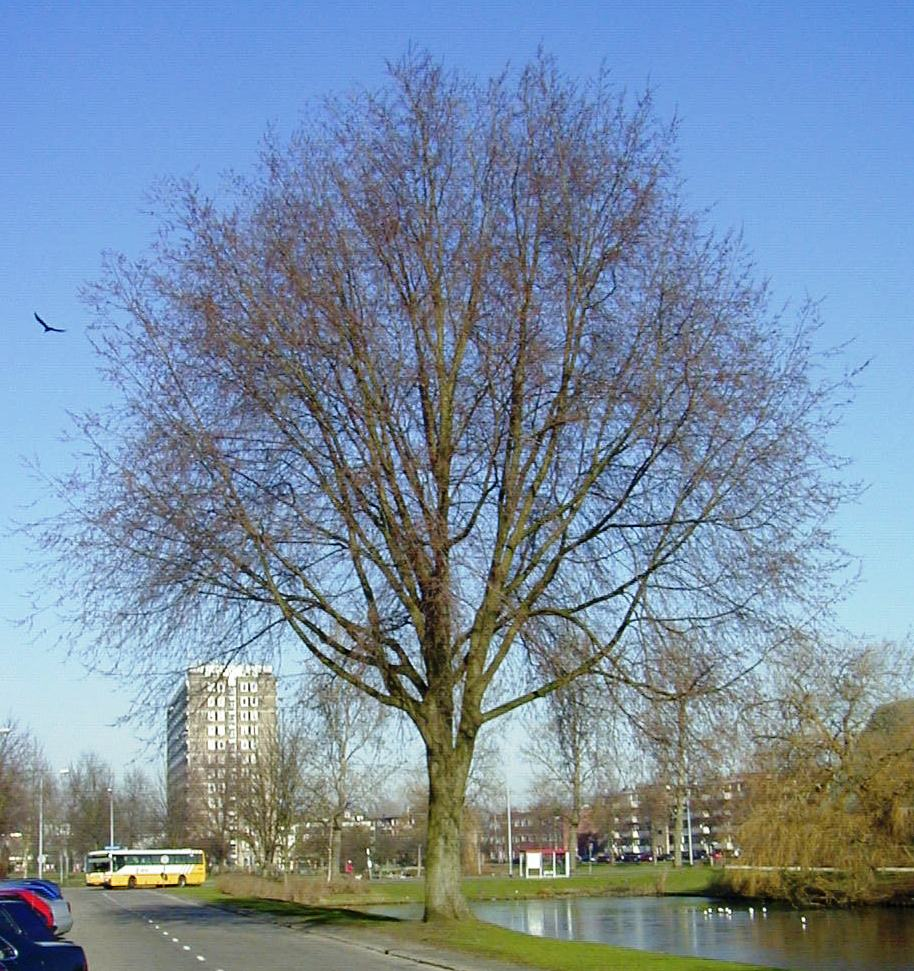
- 'Vegeta', Groningen.
- Hybrid parentage: U. glabra × U. minor
- Cultivar: 'Vegeta'
- Origin: England

Ulmus × hollandica 'Vegeta', sometimes known as the Huntingdon Elm, is an old English hybrid cultivar raised at Brampton, near Huntingdon, by nurserymen Wood & Ingram in 1746, allegedly from seed collected at nearby Hinchingbrooke Park. In Augustine Henry's day, in the later 19th century, the elms in Hinchingbrooke Park were U. nitens. Richens, noting that wych elm is rare in Huntingdonshire, normally flowering four to six weeks later than field elm, pointed out that unusually favourable circumstances would have had to coincide to produce such seed: "It is possible that, some time in the eighteenth century, the threefold requirements of synchronous flowering of the two species, a south-west wind" (wych does occur in quantity in Bedfordshire), "and a mild spring permitting the ripening of the samaras, were met."

The tree was given the epithet 'Vegeta' by Loudon, a name previously accorded the Chichester Elm by Donn, as Loudon considered the two trees identical. The latter is indeed a similar cultivar, but raised much earlier in the 18th century from a tree growing at Chichester Hall, Rawreth in Essex.

== Description ==
In areas unaffected by Dutch elm disease, Huntingdon Elms commonly grow to over 35 m, bearing long, straight branches ascending from a short bole < 4 m in height; the bole of mature trees has distinctive lattice-patterned bark-ridges which distinguish the tree from another popular U. × hollandica cultivar 'Major', known as 'Dutch Elm', whose bark breaks into small shallow flakes. The glossy, oval leaves, borne on smooth branchlets that never feature corky wings, have petioles >10 mm long, which distinguish the tree from the Wych Elm, and are very distinctly asymmetric at the base, < 12 cm long by < 7.5 cm broad contracting to an acuminate apex. The tightly clustered apetalous flowers are bright red, and appear in early spring. The samarae are obovate, < 25 mm long.

A distinguishing feature of 'Vegeta', according to Schneider (1906) and Mitchell (1974), is that the leaf margins to right and left of the petiole start from a vein, not from the midrib. The hybrid leaves from Hinchingbrooke Park collected by Heybroek in 1960 do not share this feature, nor do some old 'Vegeta'-like cultivars in Oxford and Edinburgh (see ' 'Vegeta'-like cultivars', below). This unusual feature, however, clearly appears in the older cultivar, Chichester Elm, and is frequently present in 'Vegeta' elsewhere (see gallery). If the feature distinguishes Chichester from Huntingdon, the former may be more common in cultivation than currently believed, having over time been mis-called Huntingdon. A 2013 DNA test of old Chichester elms (see under 'Cicestria') did not include a younger nursery-sourced "Huntington" as a "control".

Elwes & Henry and Bean attested that 'Vegeta' suckers freely, but other writers have stated that it does not sucker at all. This contradiction arises from methods of propagation: higher class nurseries grafted cuttings onto Wych Elm stock, which would not produce suckers, whilst others simply rooted the cuttings, which would. A comparatively high percentage of the seed is usually viable, but produces variable offspring.

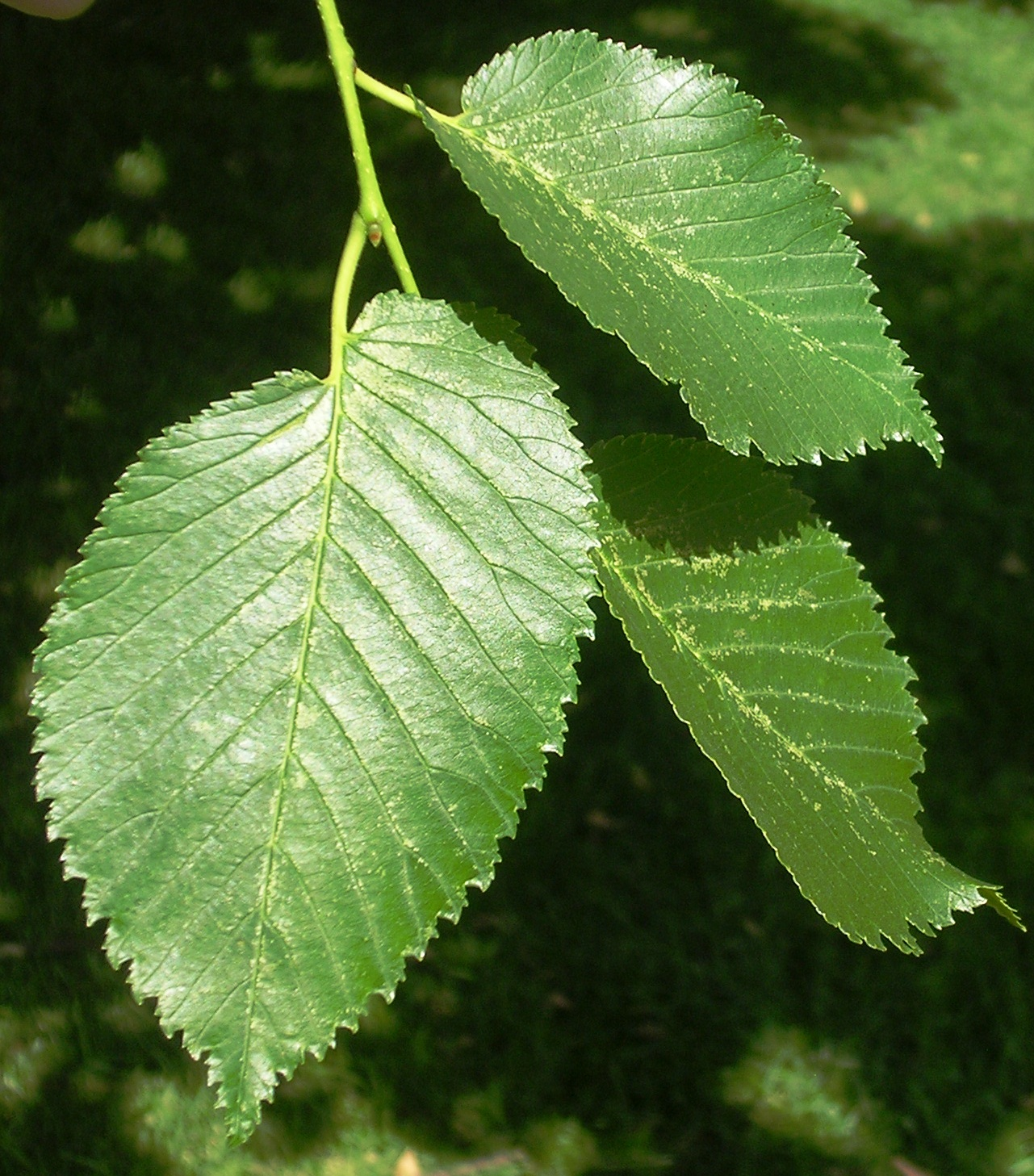
'Vegeta' leaves; note long petioles. Southsea Common

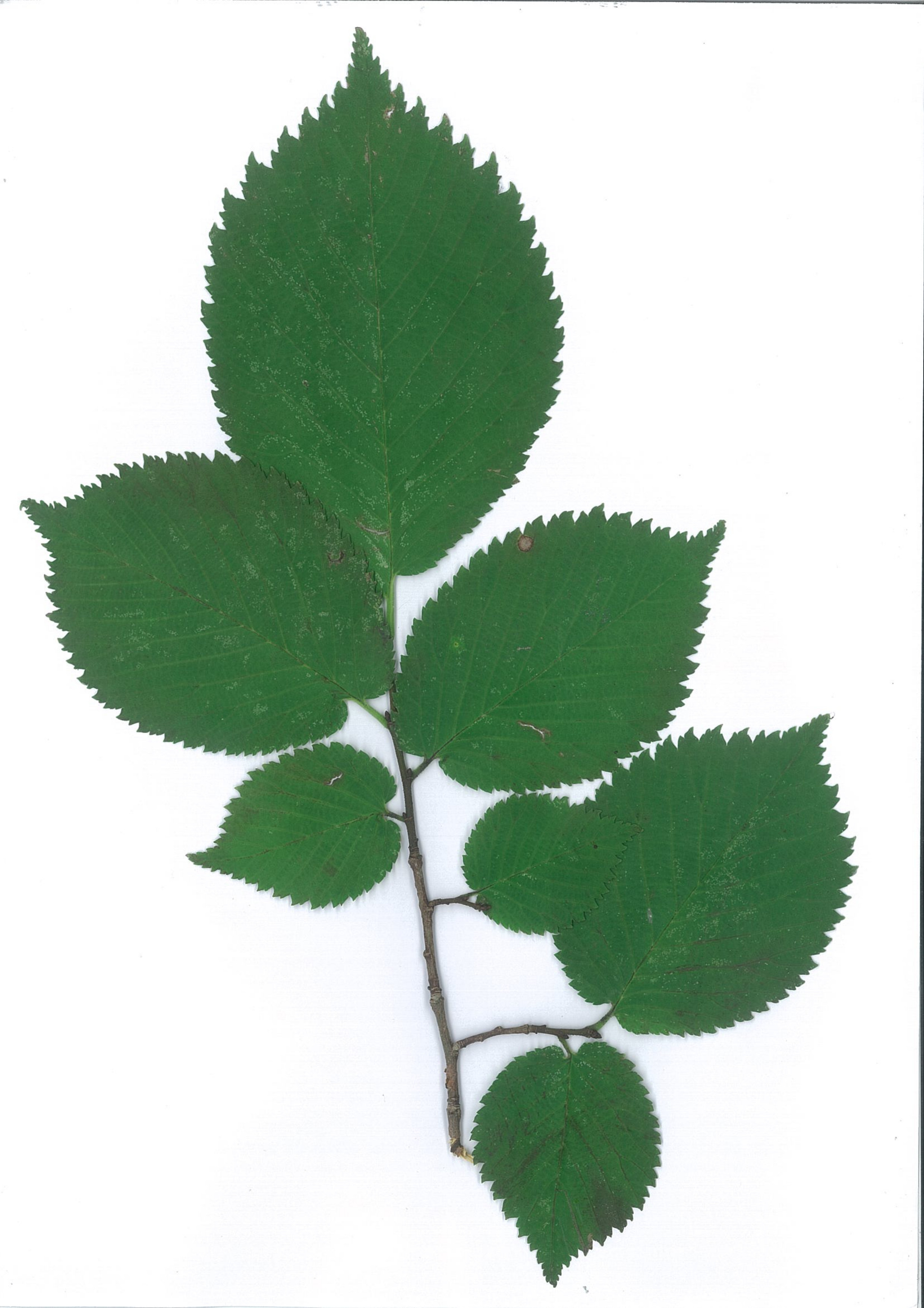
'Vegeta' leaves, Osney churchyard, Botley Road, Oxford

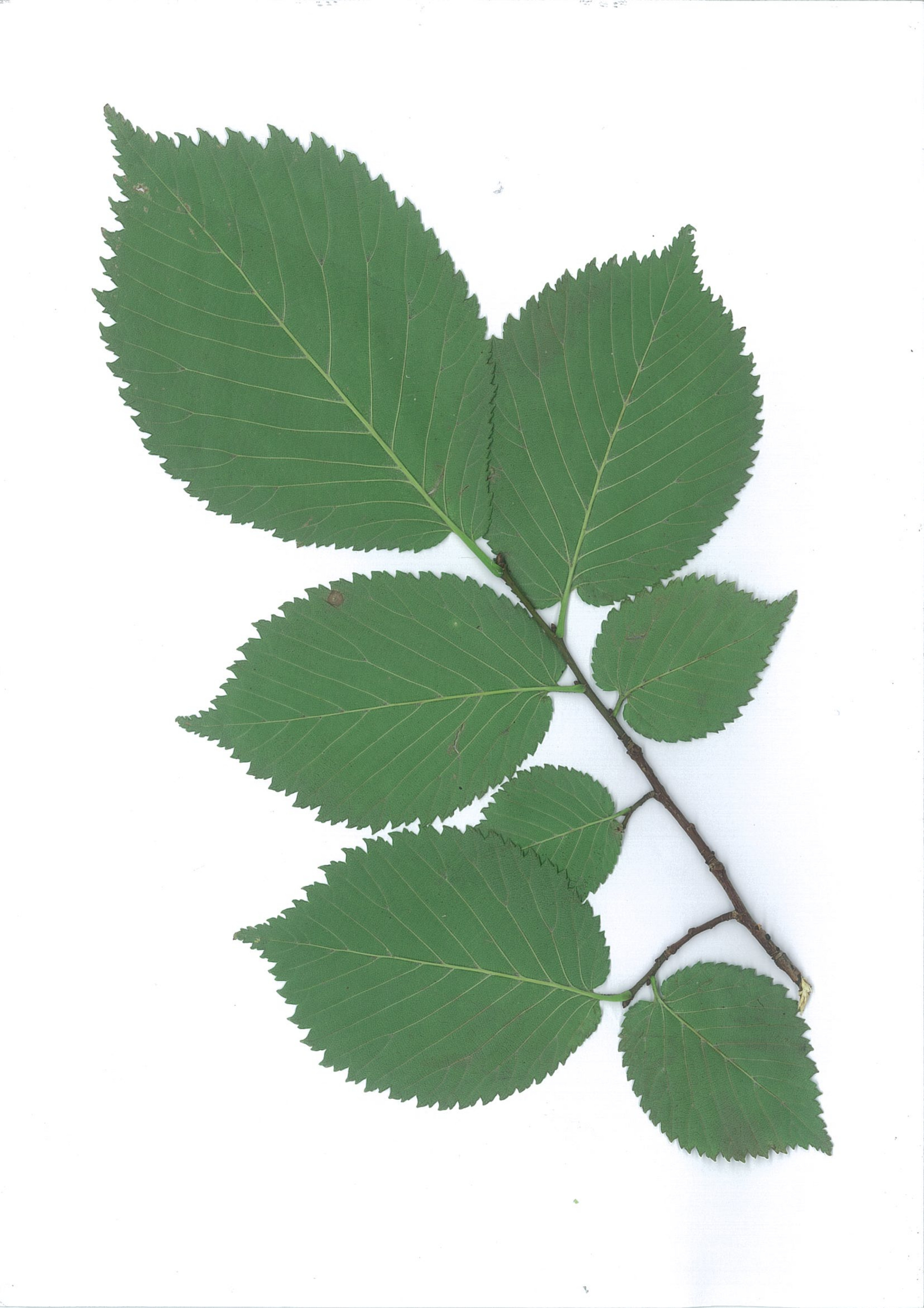
Underside

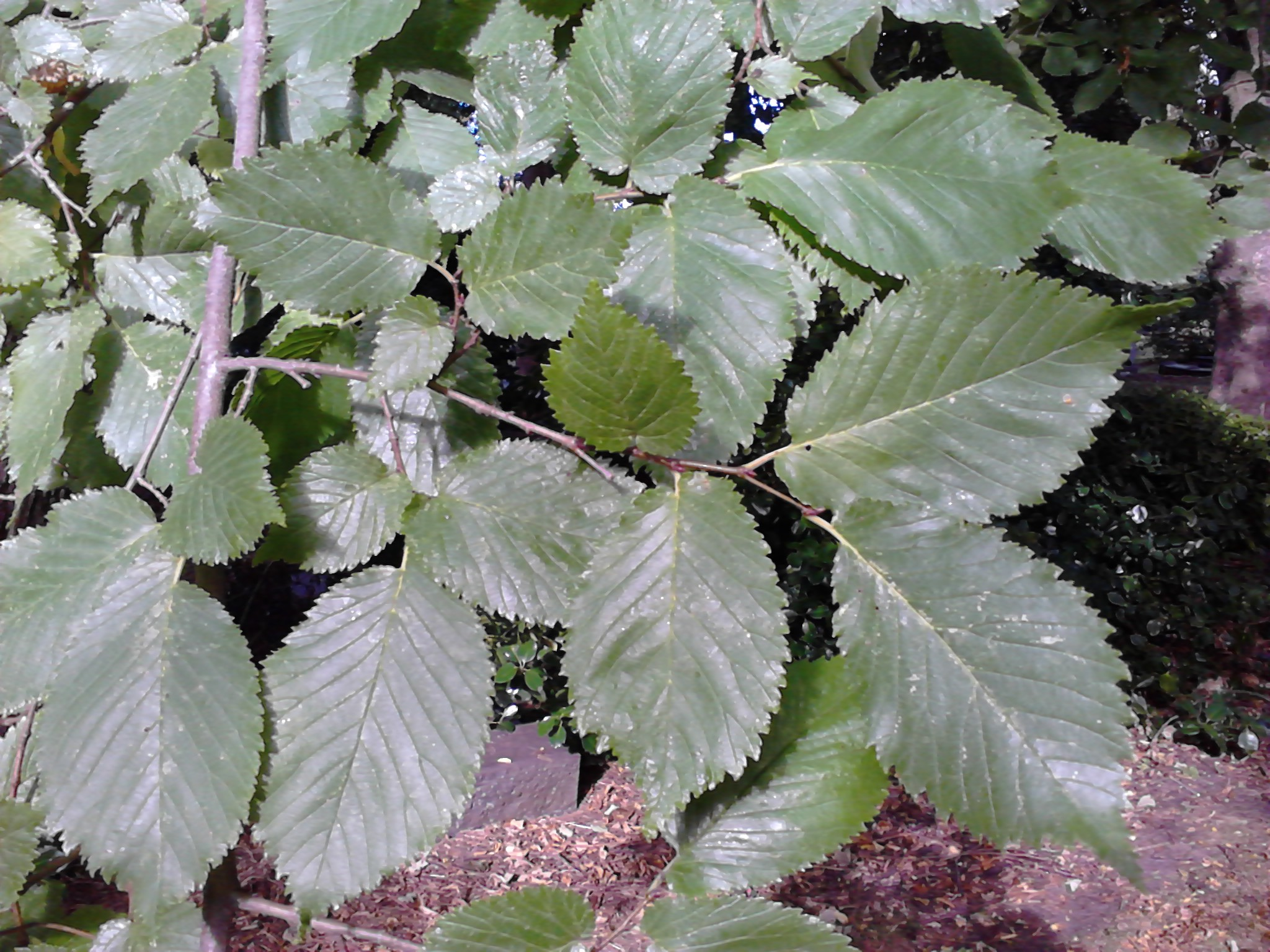
'Vegeta' foliage, North Merchiston Cemetery, Edinburgh

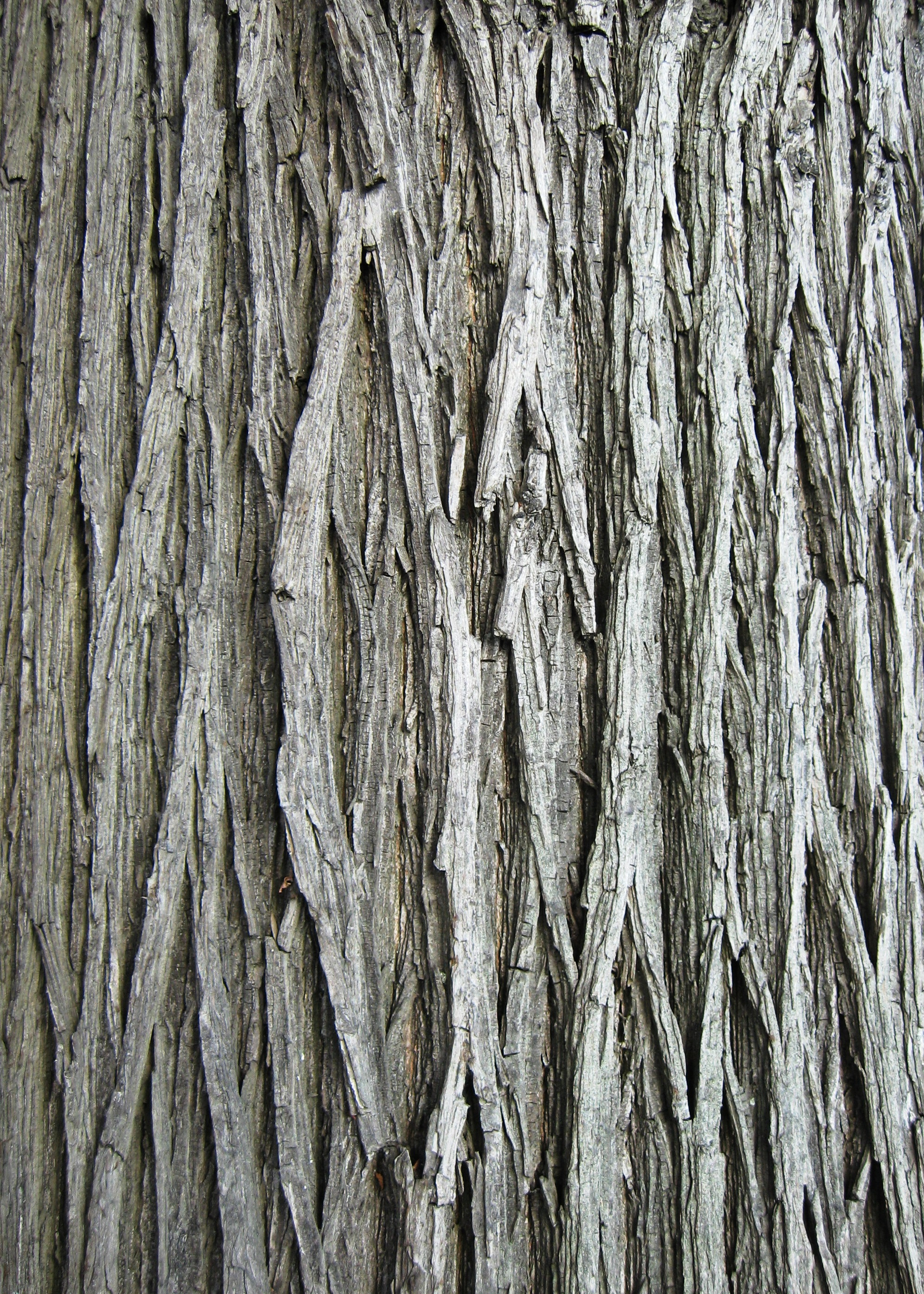
'Vegeta' bark; note lattice pattern

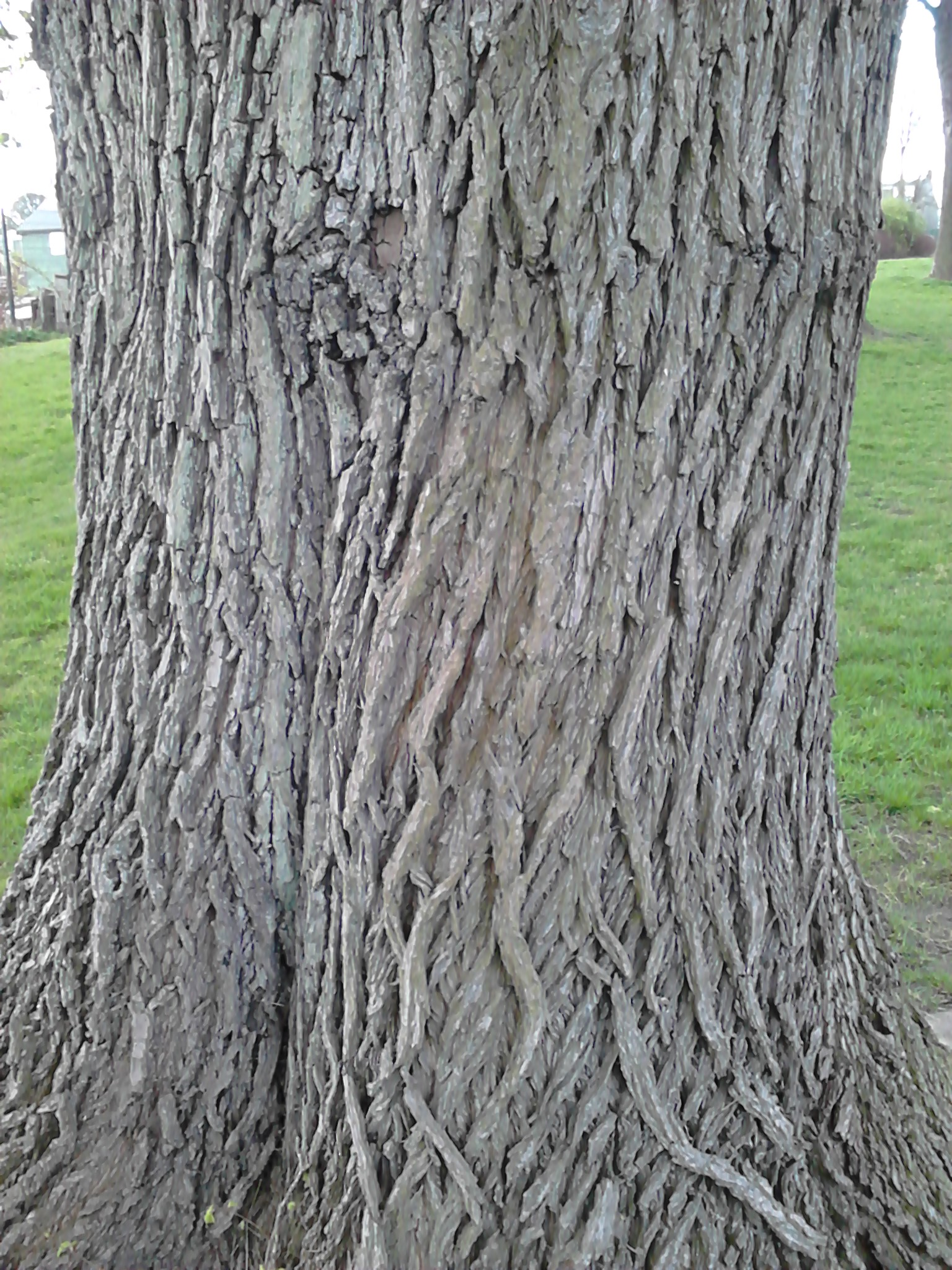
Bark of 'Vegeta', Inverleith Park, Edinburgh

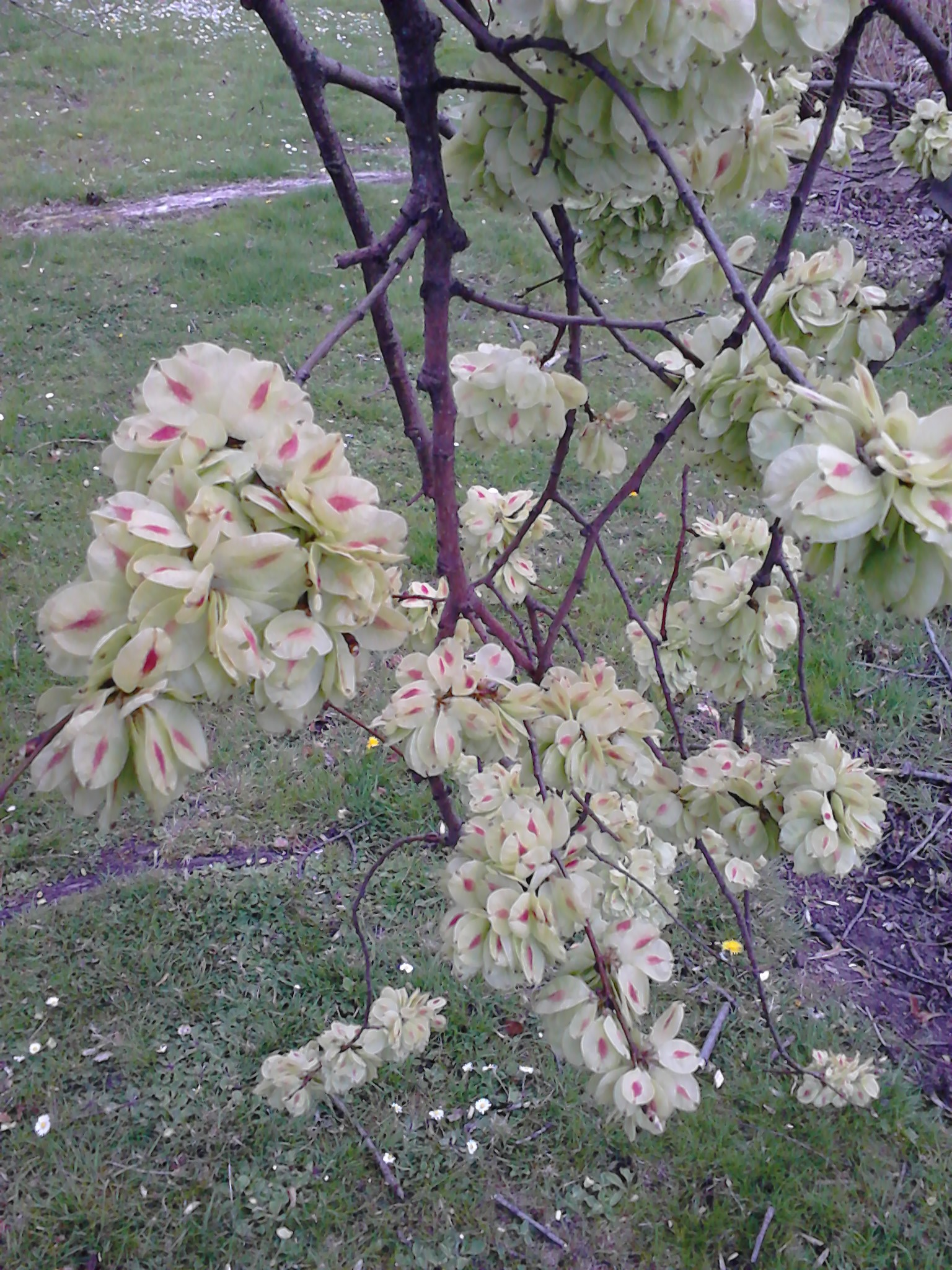
'Vegeta' samarae, showing seed close to notch

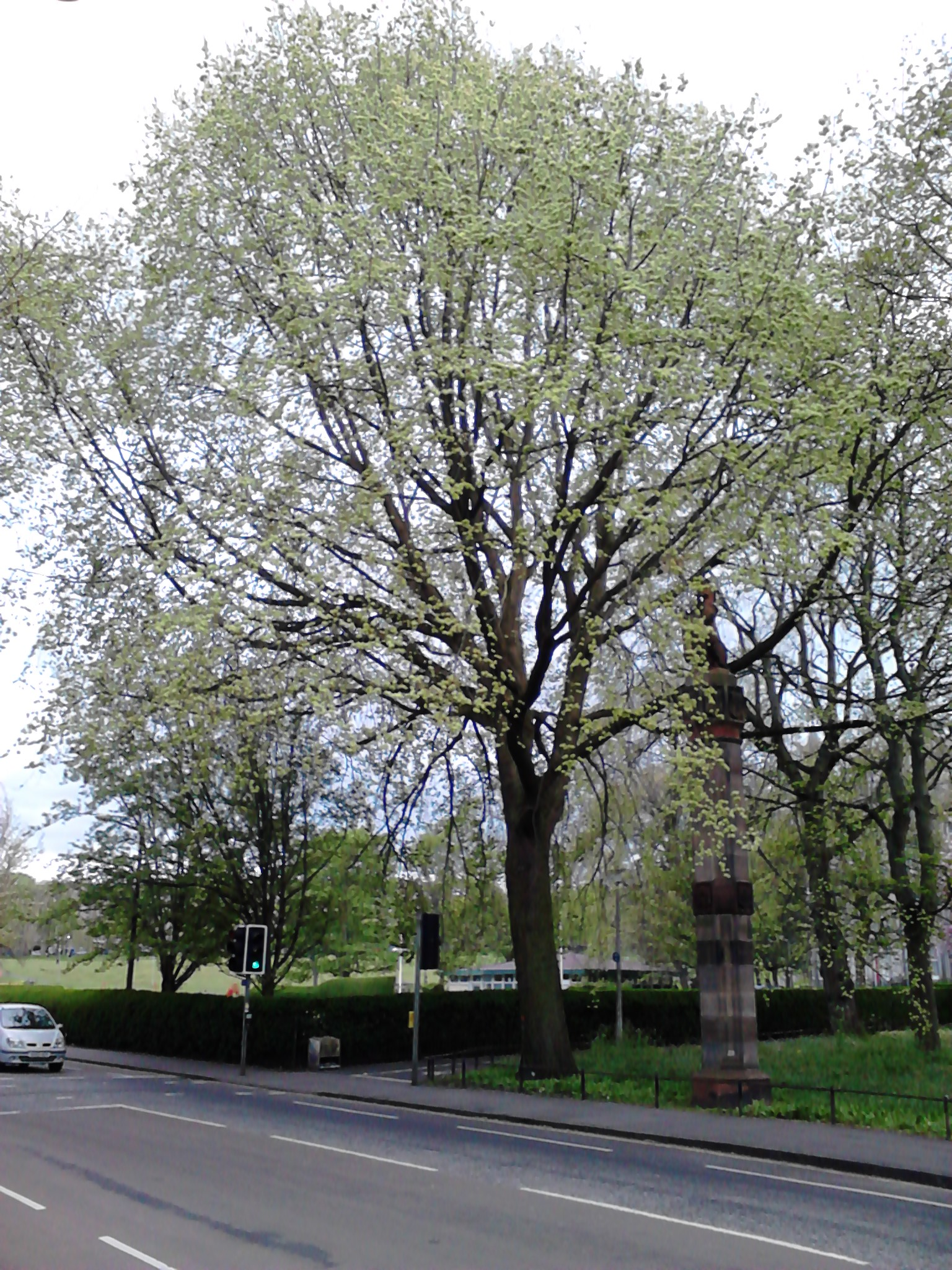
'Vegeta' fruiting, The Meadows, Edinburgh

== Pests and diseases ==
The tree was one of four European cultivars found by researchers in The Netherlands to be resistant to the initial strain of Dutch elm disease, Ophiostoma ulmi, prevalent in the 1920s and '30s, the others being 'Monumentalis' Rinz, 'Berardii' and 'Exoniensis'. The four were rated less resistant than U. foliacea clone 23, from Spain, later cultivated as 'Christine Buisman'. 'Vegeta' has, however, only a marginal resistance to the later, three times more lethal strain, Ophiostoma novo-ulmi.

== Cultivation ==
The tree was widely planted in England, particularly between the end of the nineteenth century and the 1930s, owing to its very rapid growth (< 3 m per annum) and attractive wide-spreading form, but its habit of forking sometimes led to splitting of the trunk and premature death. On the continent it was marketed in the late 19th century by the Späth nursery of Berlin as U. vegeta Loud., 'Huntingdon elm', and by the Ulrich nursery of Warsaw as U. montana vegeta, whence it was introduced to Eastern Europe, surviving there in several arboreta. Introduced to the US, it appeared in the catalogues of Hovey's nursery of Boston, Massachusetts, from the 1850s, as Ulmus glabra vegeta, 'Huntingdon Elm', as U. vegeta in the 1902 catalogue of the Bobbink and Atkins nursery, Rutherford, New Jersey, and as U. Huntingdoni in the catalogues of Kelsey's, New York, and of the Plumfield Nursery of Fremont, Nebraska, where it was described as 'one of the finest of this family'. It was planted at the Dominion Arboretum, Ottawa, in 1893 as U. montana Huntingdoni, Also introduced to Australasia (to Victoria in 1865), the tree was marketed by several Australian nurseries in the late 19th and early 20th centuries.

Owing to its resistance to the original strain of Dutch elm disease, 'Vegeta' was planted in large numbers across Amsterdam after the Second World War as a replacement for 'Belgica' (Belgian Elm), but was itself eventually replaced by the Dutch cultivar 'Dodoens' following the arrival of the more lethal strain of DED in the early 1970s. The tree is still occasionally cultivated in the Netherlands. Seven were planted in 2019 in Randweg, Nederhorst den Berg, as part of Wijdemeren City Council's elm collection. The two planted there c.1970 (in Spiegelweg) remain healthy.

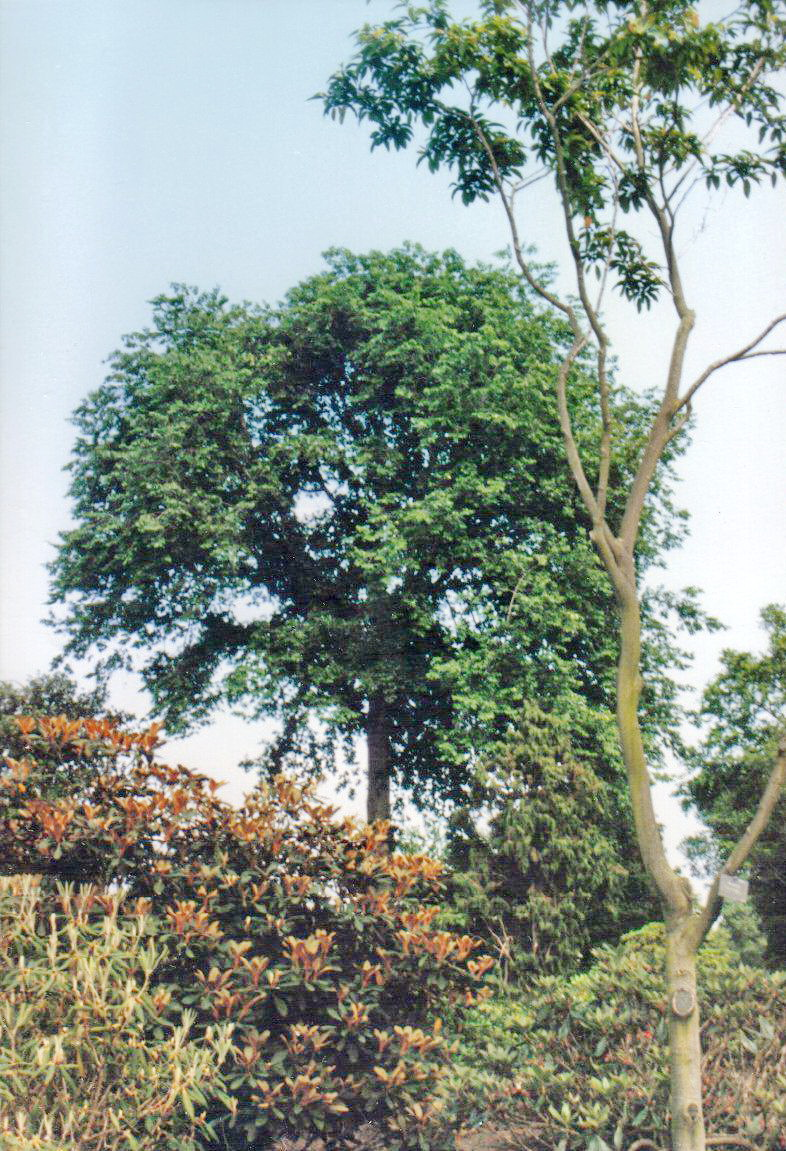
'Vegeta' in Royal Botanic Garden Edinburgh (1989)

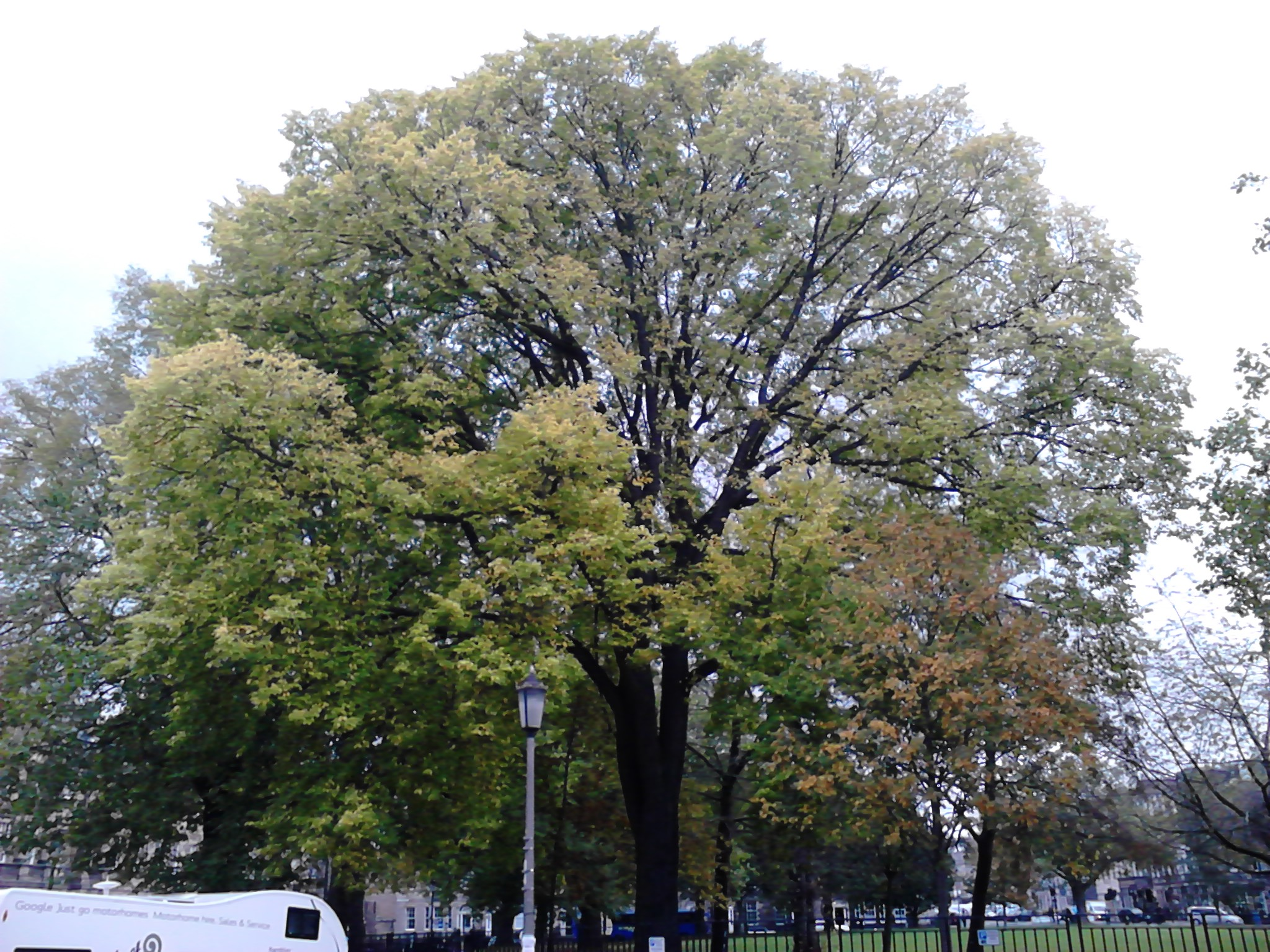
'Vegeta', autumn colours, Charlotte Square, Edinburgh (2016)

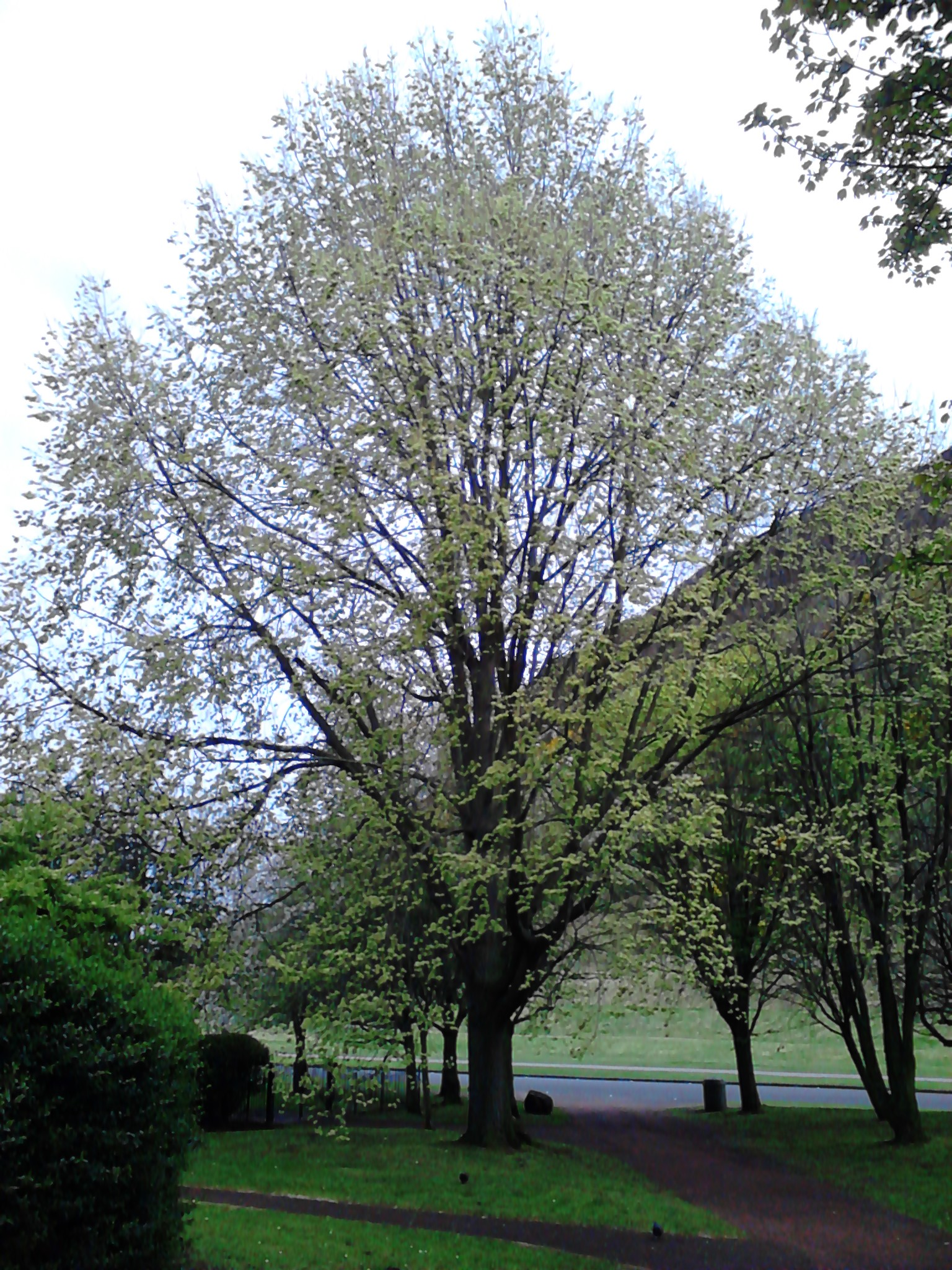
'Vegeta' fruiting, Holyrood Park, Edinburgh (2016)

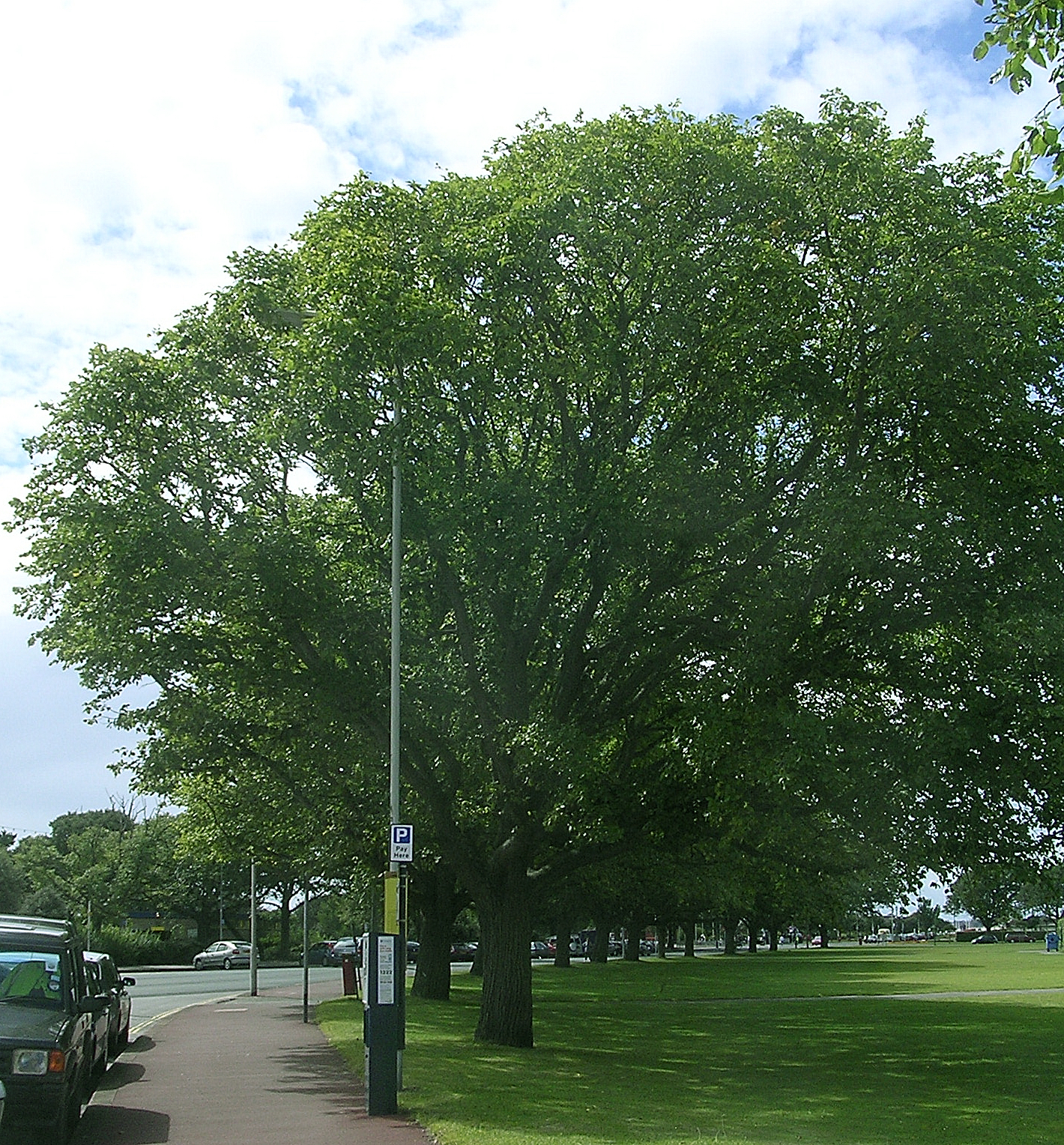
Wind-pruned 'Vegeta', Southsea Common (2007)

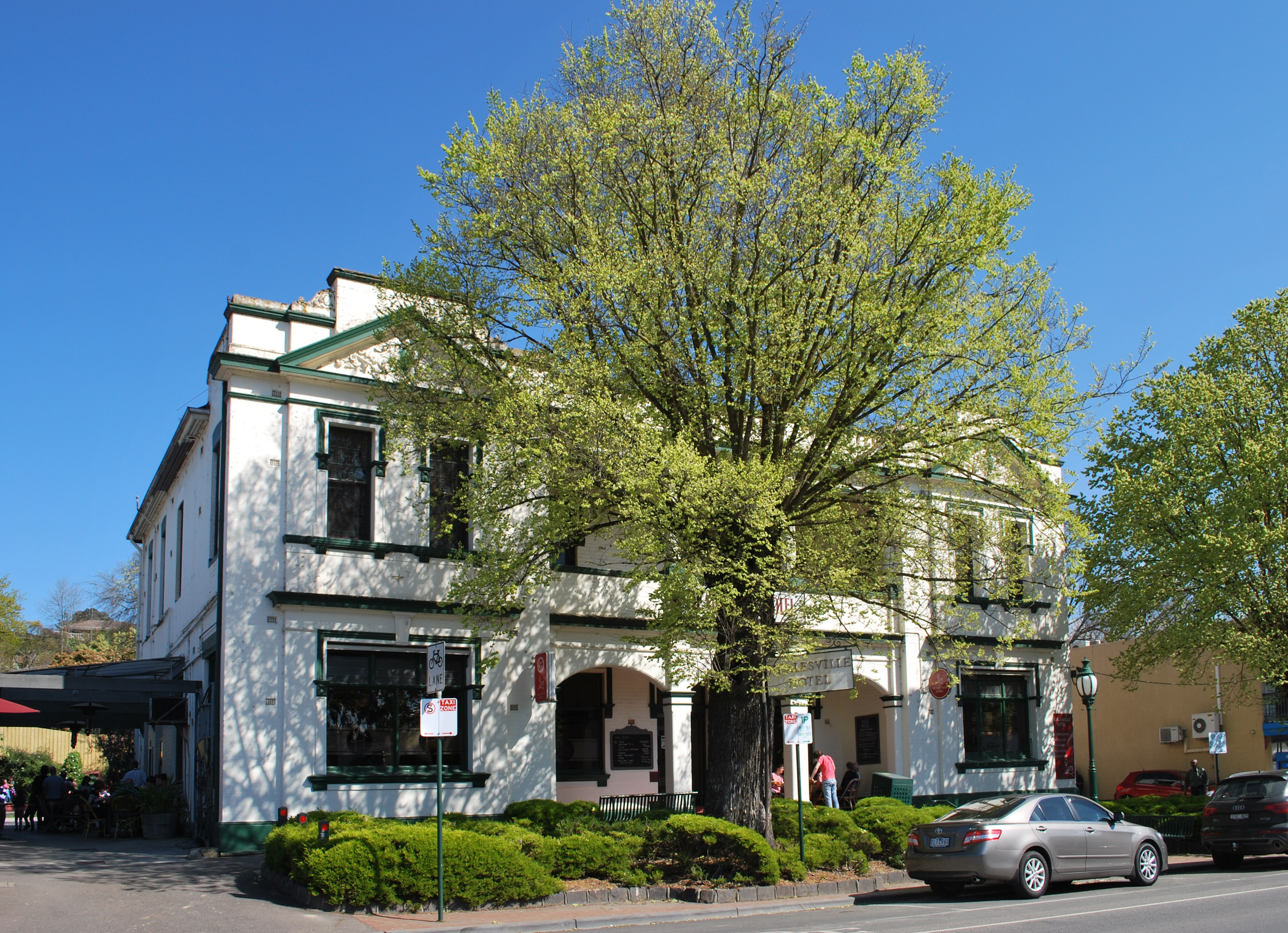
'Vegeta', Healesville, Victoria (2010)

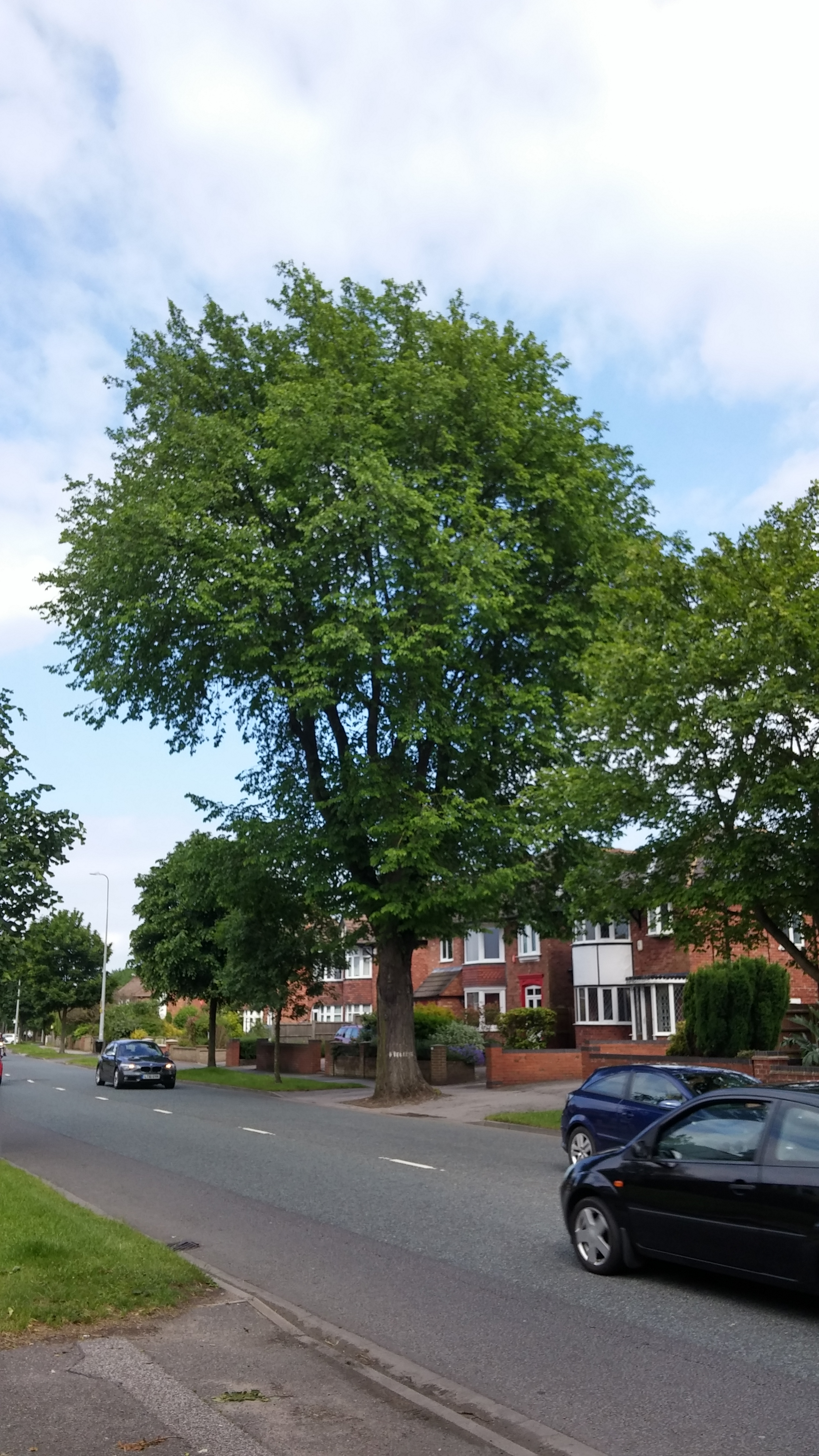
'Vegeta' in Lincoln (2016)

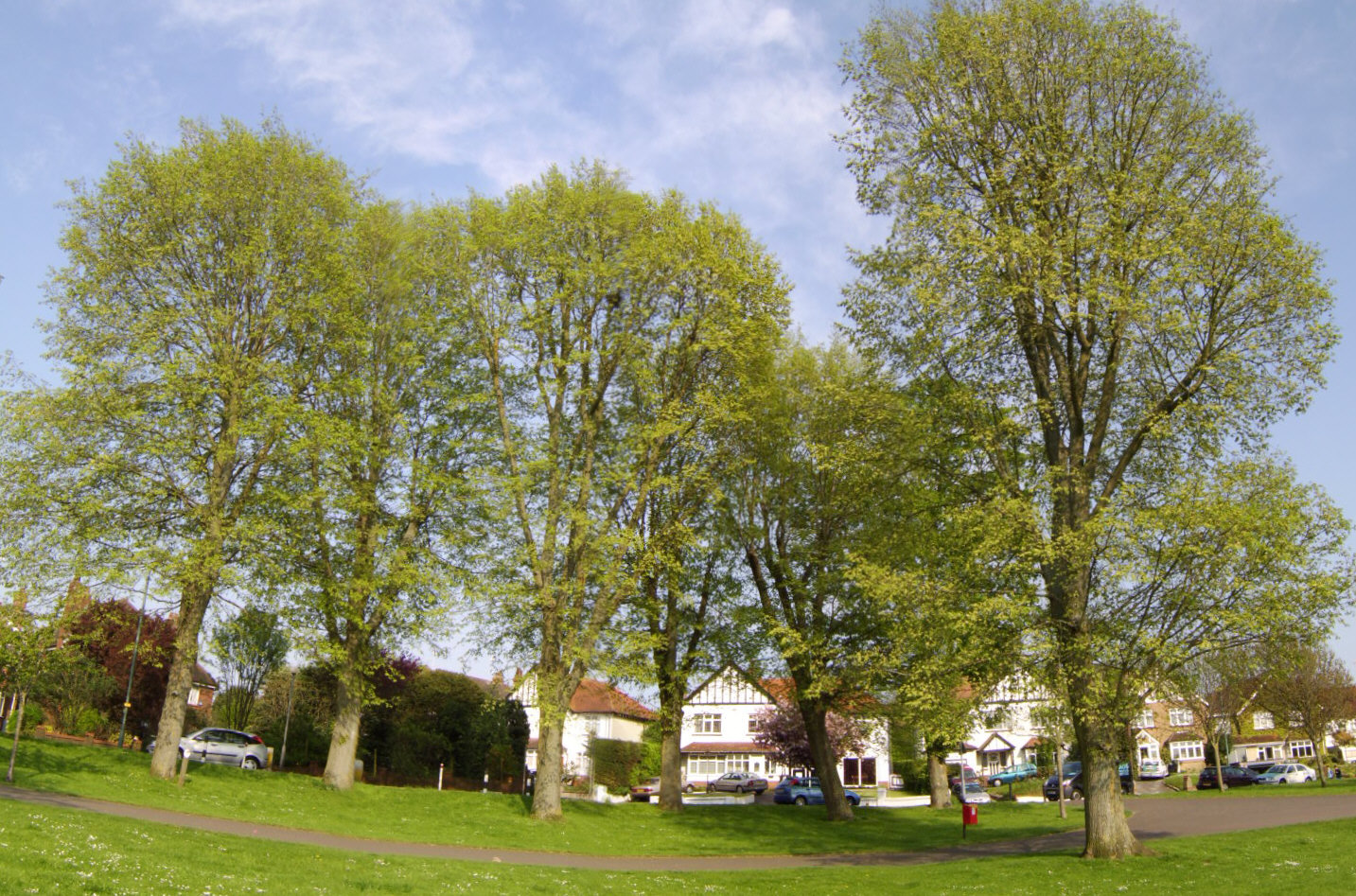
Pruned 'Vegeta' in Hove Park, East Sussex (2006)

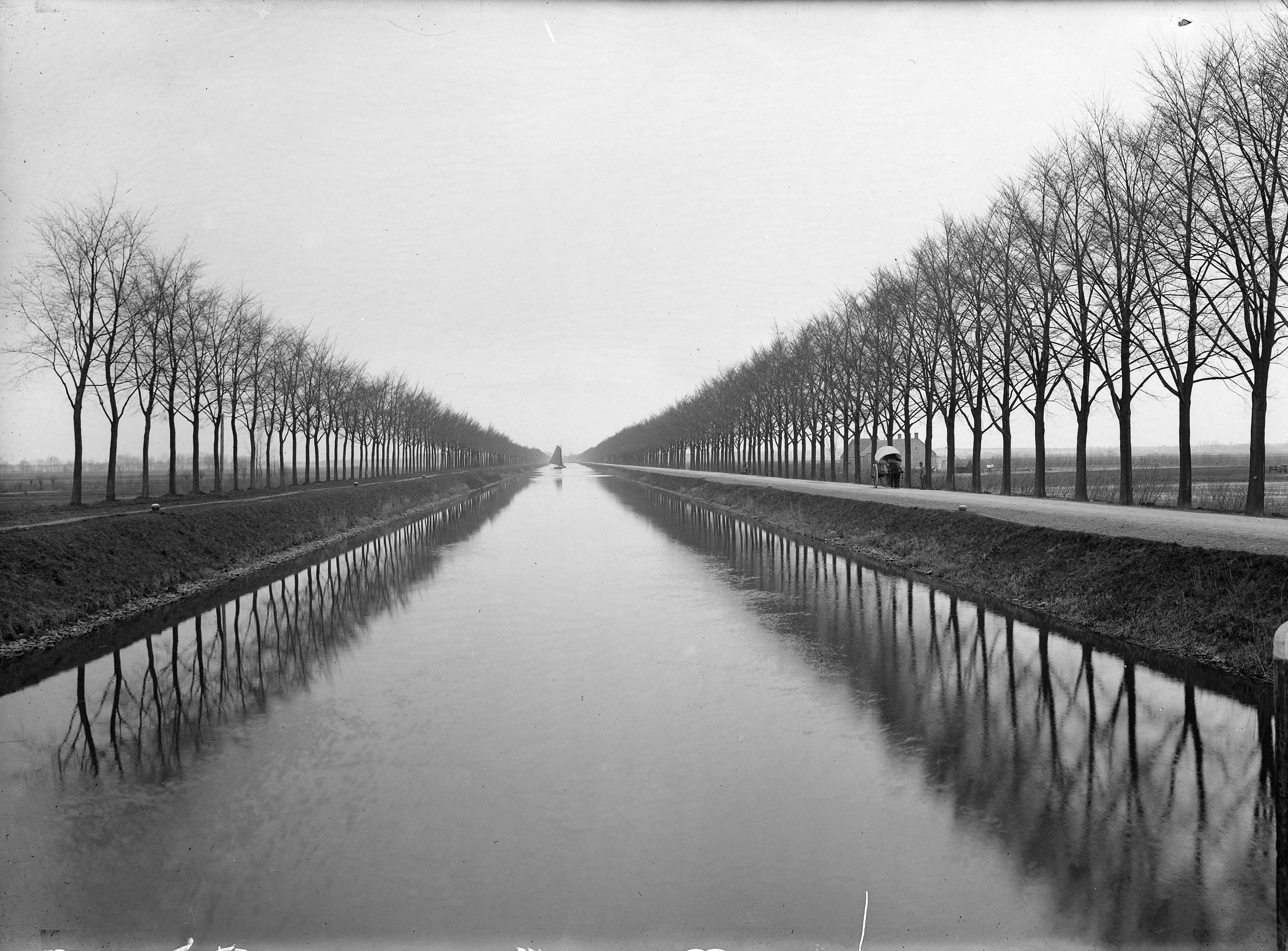
'Vegeta', Zuid-Willemsvaart, the Netherlands (mid 20th century)

== Notable trees ==
The UK TROBI Champion grew at Higham Ferrers in Northamptonshire, measuring 28 m high by 167 cm d.b.h. in 1999 but was felled in 2014; another at Courteenhall in the same county measured 166 cm d.b.h. In London, many examples still survive, notably around the Millfields Recreation Ground, the largest measuring 31 m high by 88 cm d.b.h.; others can be found at Hackney, two in Gibson Square, Islington, and one in Westminster known as The Marylebone Elm. Several dozen planted in the 1920s survive on Southsea Common in Portsmouth, isolated from disease by the sea and urban sprawl. Lincoln has five examples on Yarborough Crescent and in Hull there are four on Brunswick Avenue. One tree survives at the foot of Ladies Mile, Bristol. Another elm is located in Sheffield, as a street tree on the corner of Chelsea Road, and known locally as the Chelsea Elm.

In Wales, one very large tree (NT number 771, last recorded in 1995) stood in the grounds of Powis Castle, near Welshpool; others have been reported from Abergavenny and Caernarfon. Edinburgh has several of note, in The Meadows and Bruntsfield Links, in Inverleith Park, Fettes College, and Abercromby Place. In Éire, 'Vegeta' is represented by a tree at the Kildangan Stud, Kildangan.

Notable plantings in Australia include the Avenue of Honour in Ballarat, and Brisbane Avenue, Canberra. Mature specimens line the main street in Healesville, Victoria. Some very large specimens survive in New Zealand, notably in Auckland where it is considered "the finest of all the elms" in that city. The 16 trees planted in 1922 around the rotunda at Auckland Zoo were described as "magnificent... with stately crowns and spreading, drooping branches".

== 'Vegeta'-like hybrids ==
F1 hybrids between Wych and Field Elm (e.g. Huntingdon Elm) are fully fertile, but produce widely variant progeny. An elm at Magdalen College, Oxford, long believed to be a wych elm, then identified by Elwes as a 'Vegeta'-type hybrid, was for a time the largest elm known in Britain before it was blown down in 1911 (see under U. × hollandica). An old 'Vegeta'-type hybrid (girth 4.5 m) stood until 2021 at the University College sports ground, Abingdon Road, Oxford. Bean noted that hybrids similar to Huntingdon occur naturally in parts of east-central England and may have been raised by nurseries and distributed, and that the raising and distributing of saplings from the seed of Huntingdon will have produced elms similar to, but not the true Huntingdon clone. The Rivers Nursery, Sawbridgeworth, Hertfordshire, which closed in the 1980s, was known to have sold seedlings, rather than clones, of the Huntingdon Elm, a practice which resulted in a lawsuit brought by a disgruntled nurseryman at the Oxford Assizes in 1847.

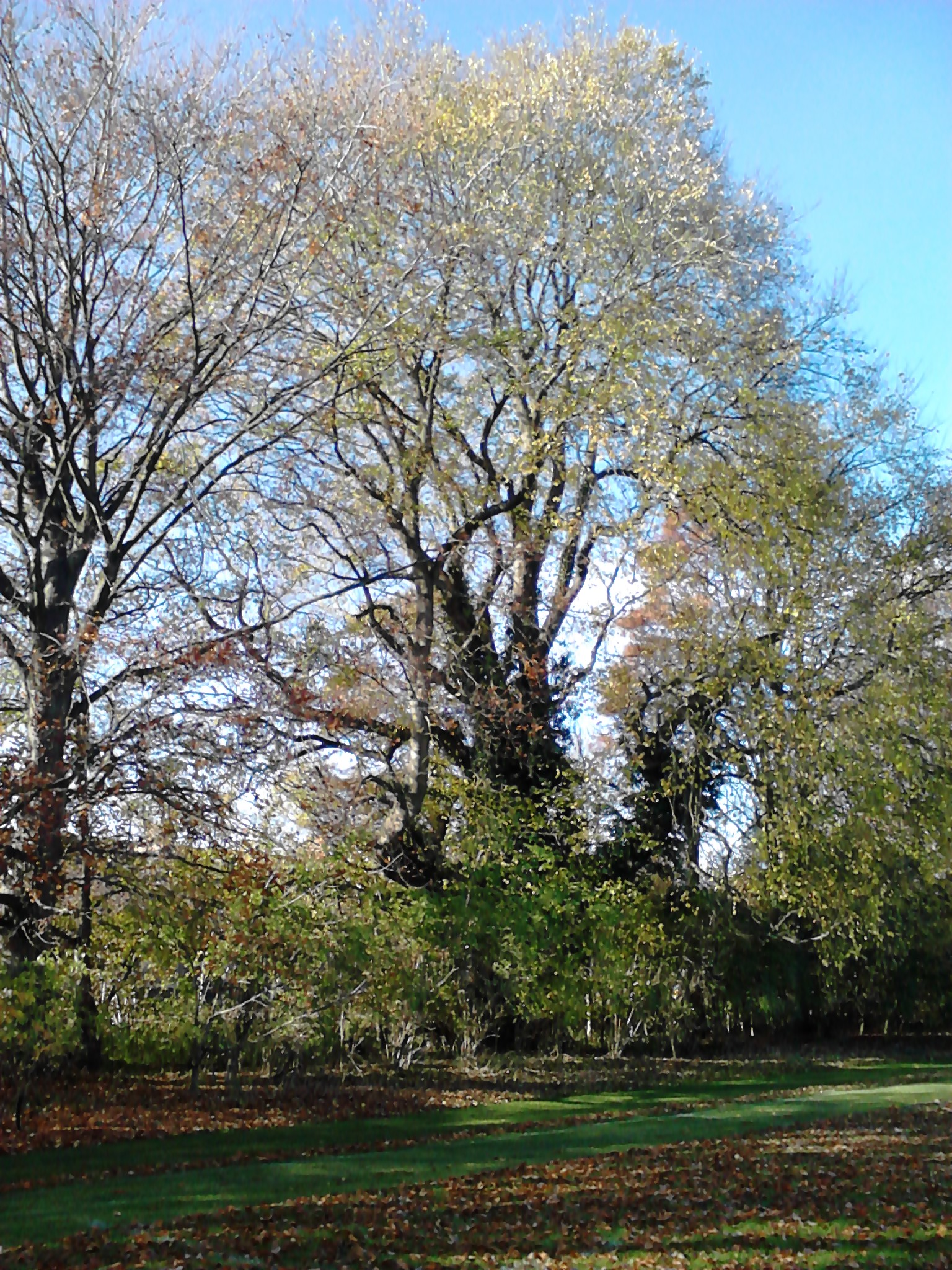
Old 'Vegeta'-type hybrid, University College sports ground, Abingdon Road, Oxford (2017)

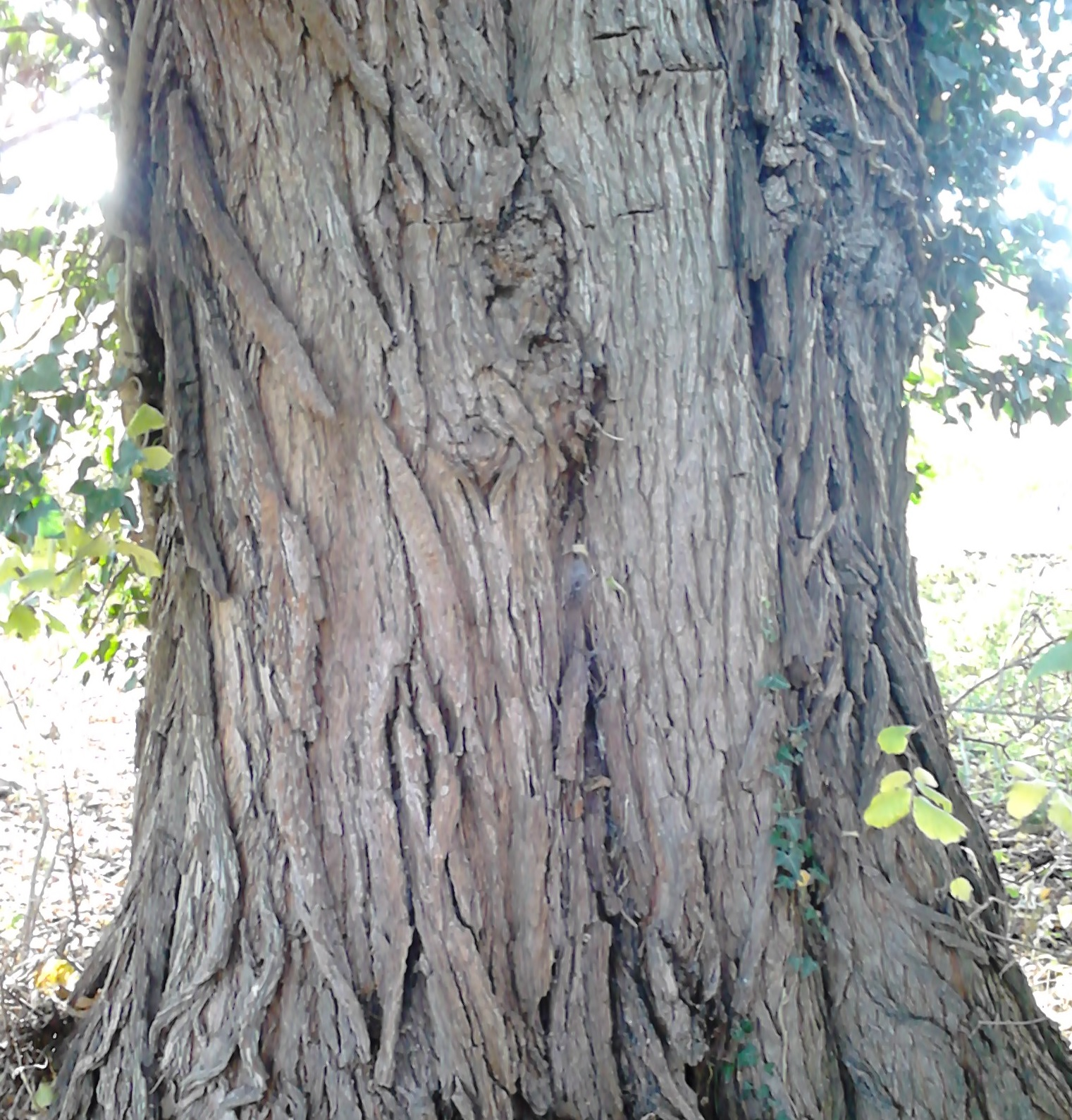
Bark of University College elm, Oxford

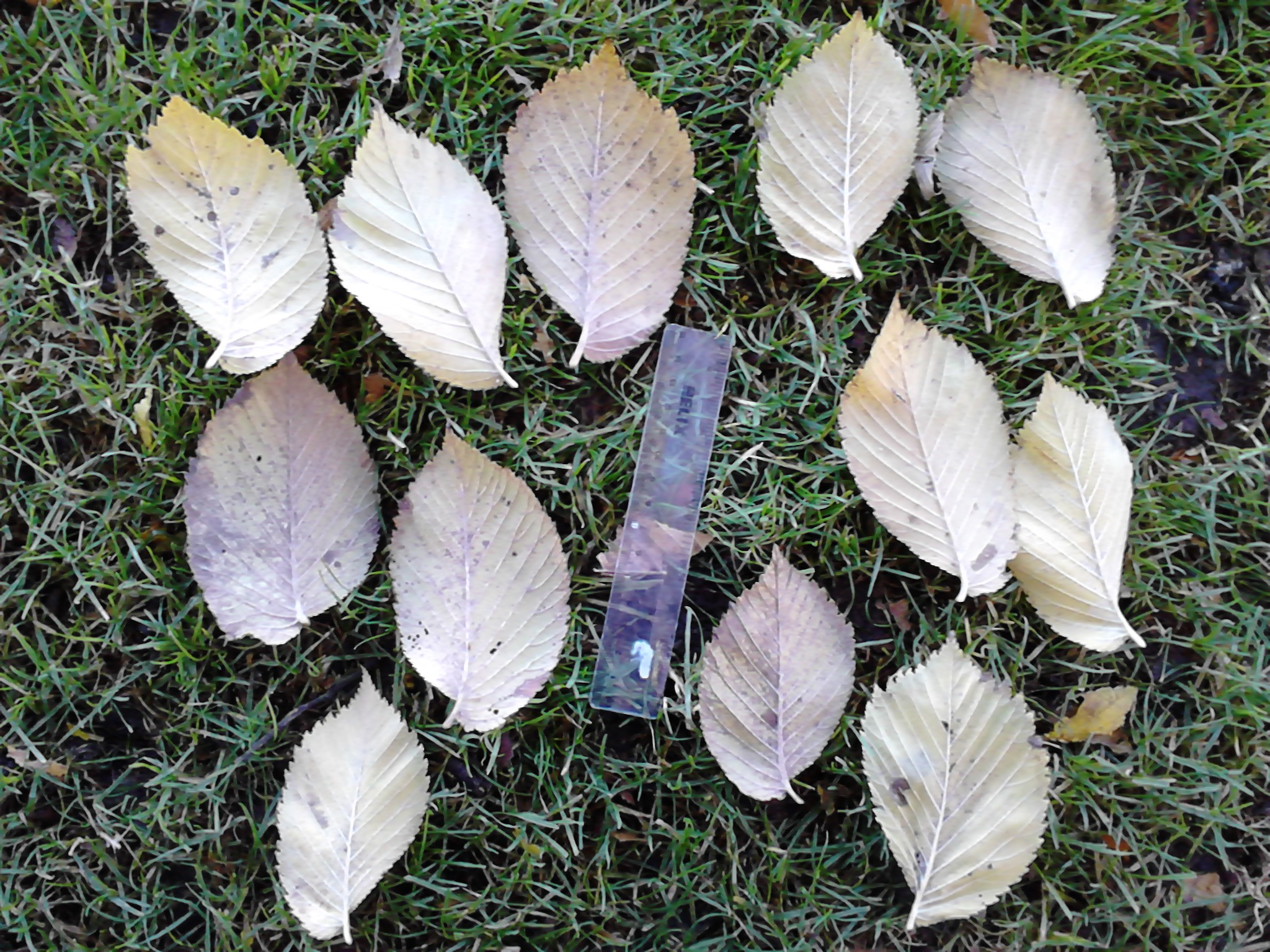
Autumn leaves of University College elm

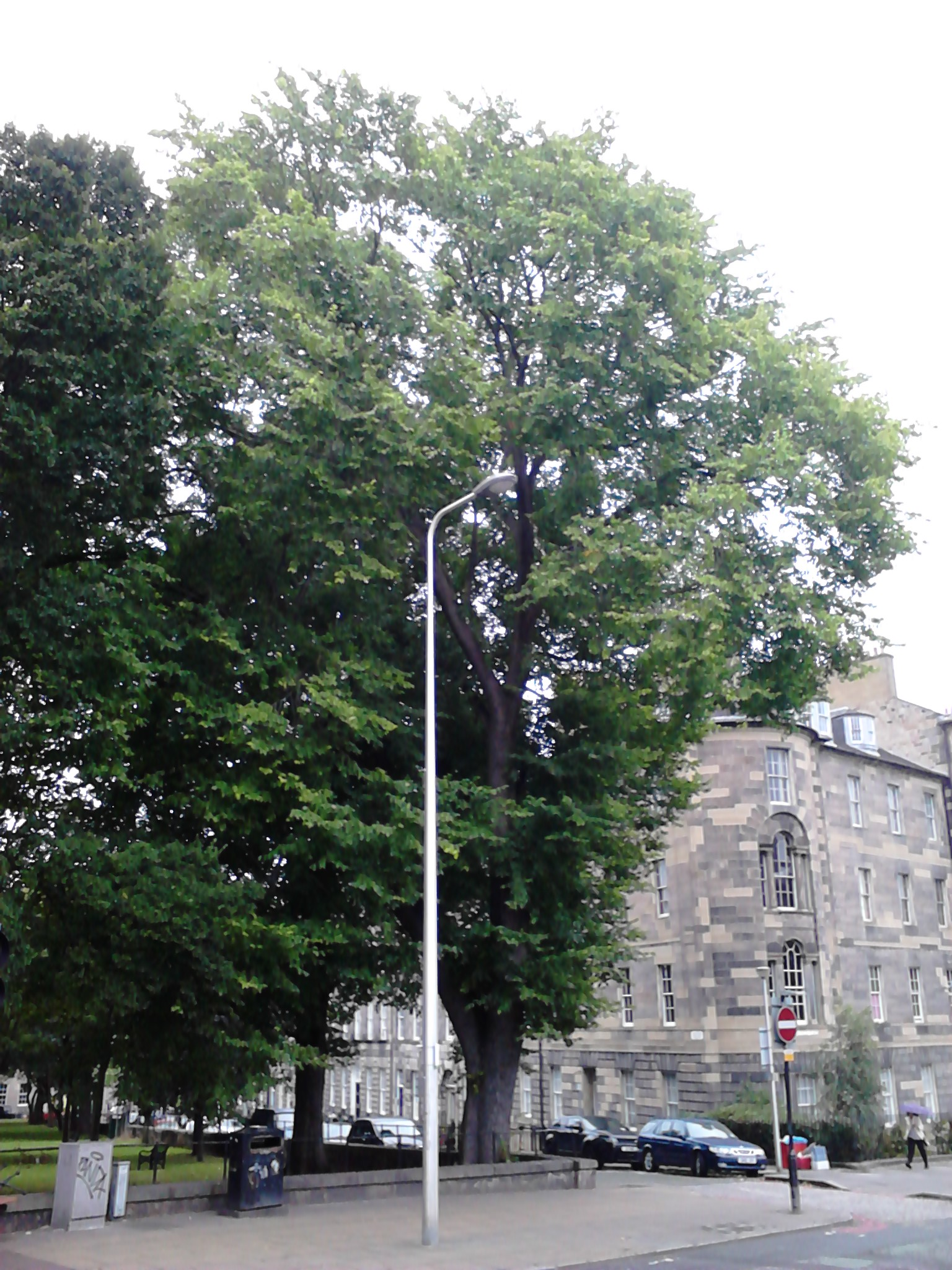
U. × hollandica, Gayfield Square, Edinburgh

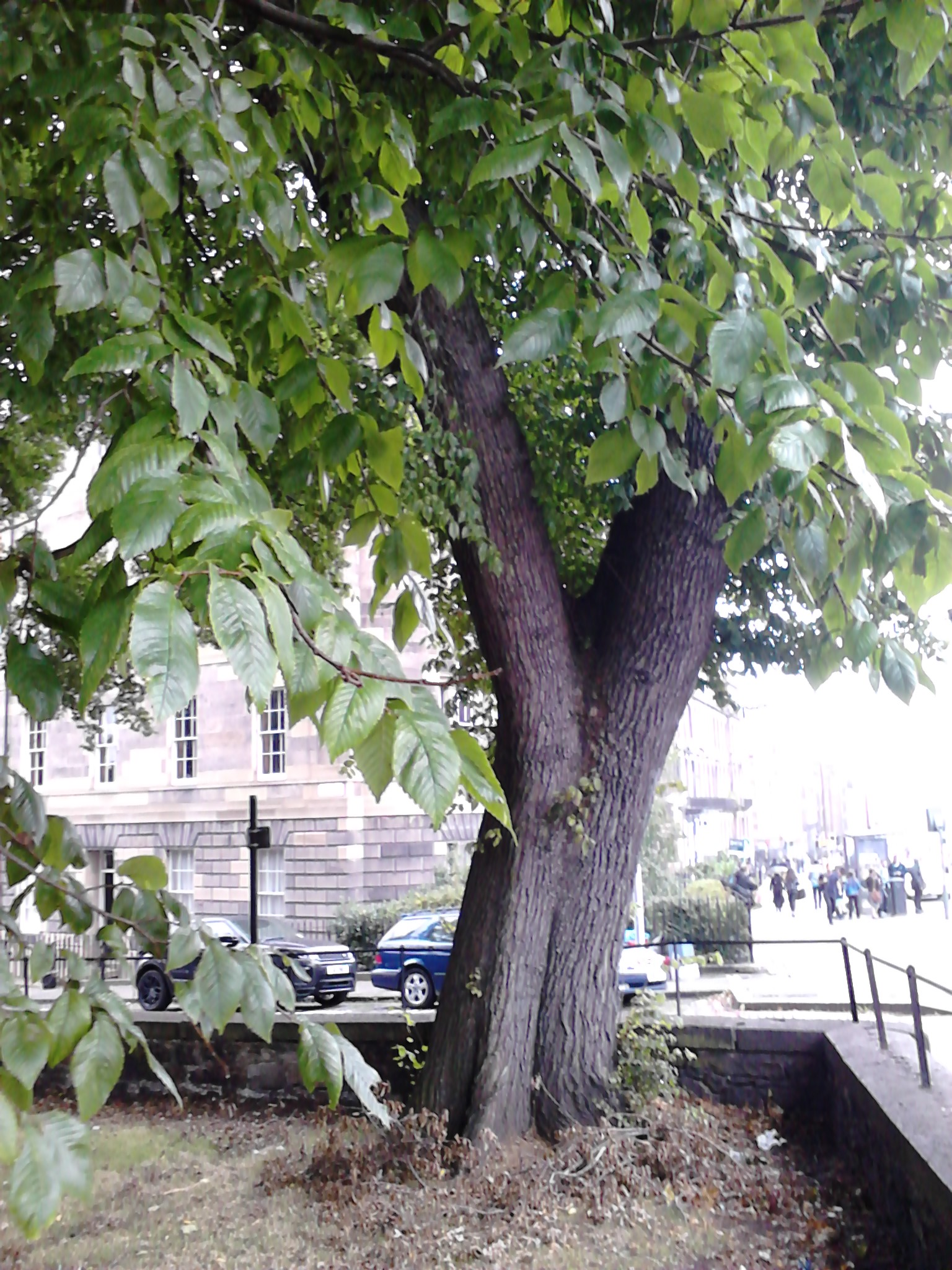
Bole of Gayfield Square elm

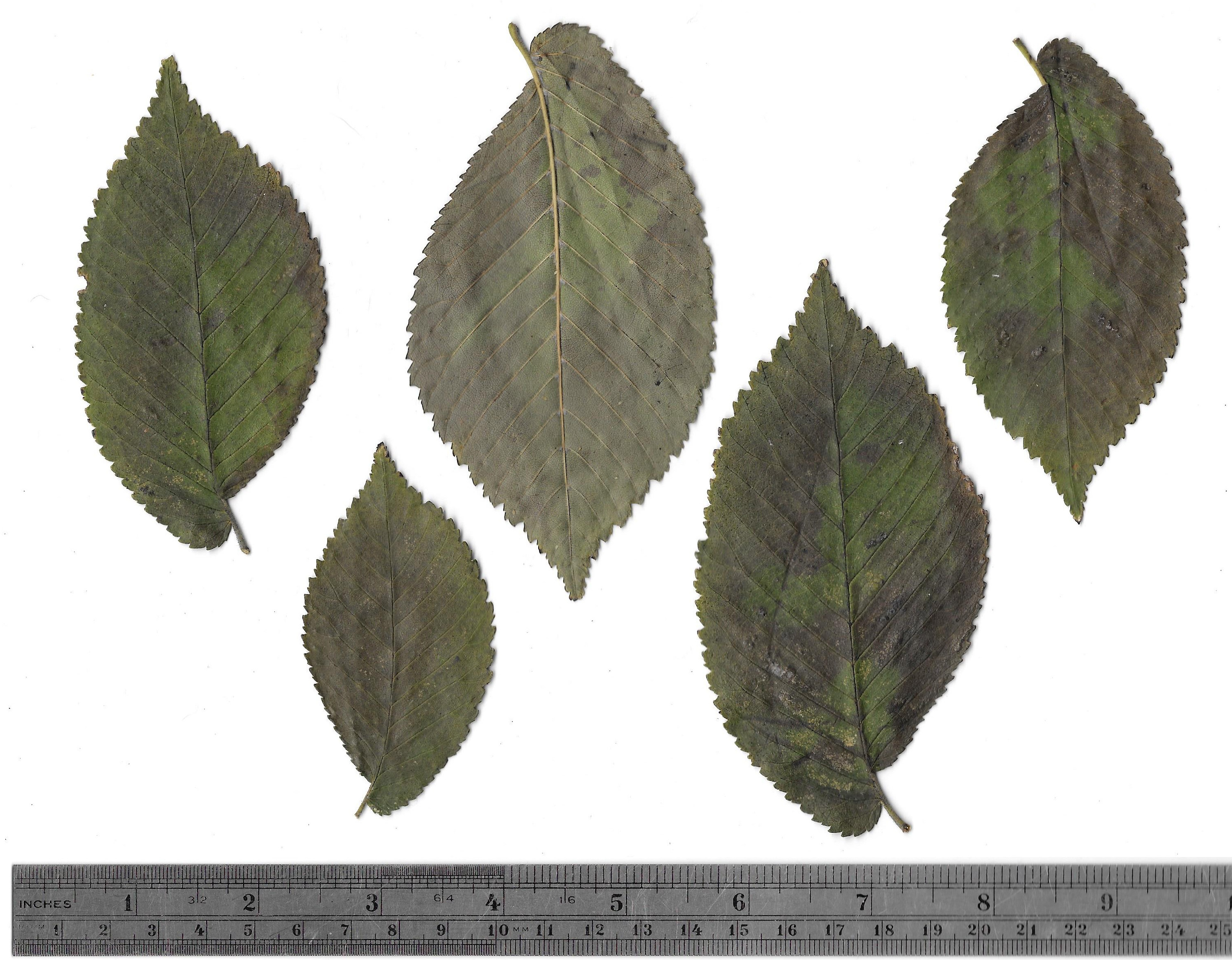
Leaves of Gayfield Square elm

== Synonymy ==
- Ulmus huntingdonensis: Dieck (Zöschen, Germany) Haupt-catalog der Obst- und gehölzbaumschulen des ritterguts Zöschen bei Merseburg supplement 1, 1887, p. 28.
- Ulmus huntingdonii Hort.: Rehder, in Bailey, The standard cyclopedia of horticulture 6: 3411, 1917, in synonymy.

== Hybrid cultivars ==
- 'Commelin'
- U.'260' (Ulmus pumila × 'Vegeta'), raised at Wageningen but never commercially released; a few specimens survive as part of the Brighton & Hove CC NCCPG Elm Collection at Happy Valley Park, Woodingdean, and in the Netherlands five were planted on the Overmeerseweg and Dammerweg in Nederhorst den Berg in 2015 as part of Wijdemeren City Council's elm collection.

== Accessions ==
=== North America ===
- Holden Arboretum, US. Acc. no. 70–128
- Morton Arboretum, US. Acc. nos. 593–30, 71–70
- New York Botanical Garden, US. Acc. no. 529/89
- United States National Arboretum, Washington D.C., US. Acc. no. PI38492

=== Europe ===
- Bodnant Garden, Conwy, UK. No accession details.
- Brighton & Hove City Council, UK. NCCPG Elm Collection
- Hortus Botanicus Nationalis, Salaspils, Latvia. One tree, planted 1998, acc. no. 18127.
- Rainis Park, Liepāja, Latvia. Two trees, planted before 1994.
- Royal Botanic Garden Edinburgh, UK. Acc. no. 19699364
- Westonbirt Arboretum , Tetbury, Glos., UK. Two trees, one without planting date or acc. no., the other planted 2001, acc. no. 1999/118.

=== Australasia ===
- Avenue of Honour, Ballarat, Australia. Details not known.
- Box Hill, (central plantation), Victoria, Australia. Details not known.
- Colac Botanic Gardens, Australia. Details not known.
- Eastwoodhill Arboretum , Gisborne, New Zealand. 3 trees, details not known.
- Fawkner Park, South Yarra, Australia. Details not known.
- Kyneton Botanic Gardens, Kyneton, Australia. Details not known.
- Royal Botanic Gardens, Melbourne , Australia
- Waite Arboretum, University of Adelaide, Adelaide, Australia. Acc. no. 336

== Nurseries ==
=== Australasia ===
- Established Tree Transplanters Pty. Ltd., Wandin, Victoria, Australia.

=== Europe ===
- Noordplant , Glimmen, Netherlands.
