= Conference (disambiguation) =

A conference is a meeting, often lasting a few days.

Conference may also refer to:

- Conference (sports)
- Conference (LDS Church)
- "Conference" (Not Going Out), a 2013 television episode
- "Conference" (Peep Show), a 2007 television episode
- Conference pear, autumn cultivar of the European pear (Pyrus communis)
