= John T. Flynn =

American journalist (1882–1964)

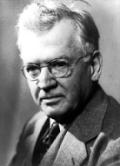
- John T. Flynn
- Born: John Thomas Flynn; October 25, 1882; Bladensburg, Maryland, U.S.
- Died: April 13, 1964 (aged 81); Amityville, New York, U.S.
- Occupation: Journalist
- Known for: Opposition to Franklin D. Roosevelt; Pearl Harbor advance-knowledge conspiracy theory

John Thomas Flynn (October 25, 1882 – April 13, 1964) was an American journalist best known for his opposition to President Franklin D. Roosevelt and to American entry into World War II. In September 1940, Flynn helped establish the America First Committee (AFC), which he abandoned when Pearl Harbor was attacked a year later, switching to support of the war effort. In his intense opposition to Roosevelt, Flynn later went on to advance the Pearl Harbor advance-knowledge conspiracy theory.

== Career ==
=== Early life and journalism ===
Flynn was born on October 25, 1882, in Bladensburg, Maryland. After graduating from Georgetown Law School, Flynn chose a career in journalism. He started at the New Haven Register, but eventually moved to New York, where he was financial editor of the New York Globe. During the 1920s and 1930s, he wrote articles for such leading publications as The New Republic, Harper's Magazine, and Collier's Weekly. He became one of the best-known political commentators in the United States. Like Oswald Garrison Villard, another key figure in the Old Right, Flynn was a leftist with populist inclinations during this period. He supported Franklin D. Roosevelt for president but criticized the New Deal. In 1939, he predicted that Social Security would be under water by 1970, and insolvent by 1980.

=== 1930s ===
In 1931, Flynn's book, Graft in Business, was published. In this work, Flynn outlined an argument that business could not be trusted, and strongly advocated for government enforcement of rules of fair competition. Flynn's ideas were a key influence on President Roosevelt's National Industrial Recovery Act. Consistently at all stages of his literary career, Flynn opposed militarism. He was a key advisor to the 1934 Nye Committee, which investigated the role of the so-called "merchants of death" (munitions manufacturers and bankers) in leading to U.S. entry into World War I. By 1936, Flynn had publicly broken with Roosevelt. He was already drawing comparisons between the centralist features of the New Deal on the one hand, and Benito Mussolini's policies on the other; he wrote: "We seem to be not a long way off from the kind of Fascism which Mussolini preached in Italy before he assumed power; and we are steadily approaching the conditions which made Fascism possible."

=== America First, 1940–1941 ===
Flynn was one of the founders of the non-interventionist America First Committee, the first nationally organized coalition of the many politically wide-ranging groups which opposed America's entry into World War II. Flynn and the America Firsters accused FDR of falsely claiming that he wanted to keep America out of the war, while in reality pursuing a number of increasingly militant policies to help Britain in every way possible, in violation of the neutrality treaties which had been passed by isolationist Senators earlier in the 1930s. Flynn soon became head of the New York City chapter, and largely through his efforts quickly claimed a membership of 135,000. As Roosevelt rolled out a series of policies to give "all help short of war", America First mounted campaigns against them, on the grounds that each of them constituted war: first, the nation's first peacetime draft — Selective Service, begun in 1940, then Lend-Lease which allowed the British, near bankruptcy, to continue to buy the food and arms they needed as they reached their second year of resisting Nazi invasion single-handedly. Both these passed in Congress, but America First gained enormous momentum in a nation riven by the entirely contradictory wishes to both support the British yet stay out of the war, with 850,000 members within a year of its founding. In September, 1941, Flynn organized a Senate subcommittee investigation led by Senator Wheeler, into the movie studios for creating pro-British and pro-interventionist "propaganda" in more than 50 Hollywood films, with studio heads Jack Warner and Darryl Zanuck compelled to testify.

=== World War II ===
On December 7, 1941 – the moment he learned of the attack on Pearl Harbor – Flynn wanted the America First Committee to disband, and throw their support entirely toward the war effort – which it did, on December 11, 1941. Flynn had by then turned entirely against New Deal progressivism, which he regarded not as liberal at all, but as a "degenerate form of socialism and debased form of capitalism". In 1944 he wrote As We Go Marching, a sharp critique of the American drift toward statism of the fascist variety:

But when fascism comes it will not be in the form of an anti-American movement or pro-Hitler bund, practicing disloyalty. Nor will it come in the form of a crusade against war. It will appear rather in the luminous robes of flaming patriotism; it will take some genuinely indigenous shape and color, and it will spread only because its leaders, who are not yet visible, will know how to locate the great springs of public opinion and desire and the streams of thought that flow from them and will know how to attract to their banners leaders who can command the support of the controlling minorities in American public life. The danger lies not so much in the would-be Fuhrers who may arise, but in the presence in our midst of certainly deeply running currents of hope and appetite and opinion. The war upon fascism must be begun there.

The book warned of an unholy alliance influencing U.S. foreign policy, and included these words satirizing the view presented by advocates of foreign wars:

The enemy aggressor is always pursuing a course of larceny, murder, rapine and barbarism. We are always moving forward with high mission, a destiny imposed by the Deity to regenerate our victims, while incidentally capturing their markets; to civilise savage and senile and paranoid peoples, while blundering accidentally into their oil wells.

In fall 1944, Flynn completed a 25-page document entitled The Truth about Pearl Harbor which so impressed publisher Robert McCormick that he had it printed in its entirety, beginning on the front page of the October 22 Chicago Tribune, in hopes of influencing the upcoming election. Flynn argued that Roosevelt and his inner circle had been plotting to provoke the Japanese into an attack on the U.S. and thus provide a reason to enter the war since January 1941; and that the sanctions which the Roosevelt Administration had placed on Japan during that year were intended for that purpose (specifically, the oil embargo, whose lifting was attached to conditions the Administration knew Japan could never agree to). Flynn also alleged that Pearl Harbor's able Navy and Army commanders, Admiral Husband E. Kimmel and General Walter Short, were left without proper warning that conditions had deteriorated to this extent with Japan, so they would be caught off guard. Flynn had the article, reprinted in pamphlet form, distributed out of his office. This would mark the beginning of Pearl Harbor advance-knowledge conspiracy theory.

Shortly after his brief tenure working with the GOP for the 1944 presidential elections, Flynn learned that GOP candidate Thomas E. Dewey had allegedly gotten hold of highly classified information that America had broken the Japanese naval code early in 1940 – long before the attack on Pearl Harbor – but, at the administration's request, not made this information public. Besides lowering his opinion of the GOP as too weak to fight his nemesis, Roosevelt, Flynn further reasoned that meant FDR must have known in precise detail that the attack was coming and deliberately withheld this information from the now-disgraced commanders in order to create an outraged demand for war. Flynn added this information to his booklet, retitling it "The Final Secret of Pearl Harbor," which again ran as a front-page story in the Chicago Tribune and became a booklet printed and distributed by Merwin K. Hart's National Economic Council. Flynn's allegations led to a new congressional investigation of the attack, for which Flynn became chief investigator. However, two Republicans joined the Democrats on the committee in creating a report that ostensibly vindicated Roosevelt. While U.S. and British cryptologists had made some progress in decrypting the Japanese naval code by late 1941, the code was not broken until late May 1942, before the planned Japanese invasion of Midway Island.

=== Cold War ===
During the Cold War period, Flynn continued his opposition to interventionist foreign policies and militarism. An early critic of American involvement in the affairs of Indochina, he maintained that sending US troops would "only be proving the case of the Communists against America that we are defending French imperialism". Flynn became an early and avid supporter of Senator Joseph McCarthy. This was ironic because Flynn "had long ridiculed the idea that communism was a threat to America", dismissing American Communists as a tiny handful of fractious isolated radicals who were too busy attacking each other to threaten democracy. In March 1943, he wrote that fighting communism in America was "a waste of time", and argued in As We Go Marching that the real threat was fascism.

== Personal life and death ==
For many years, Flynn made his home in Bayside, Queens, in a large compound overlooking Little Neck Bay, with a house and a separate building he used as a broadcasting studio. He was a neighbor and friend of Jessie Taylor Corbett, the widow of boxing champion James J. Corbett. His son, Thomas Flynn, was an influential figure credited with helping to save New York City from bankruptcy in the 1970s. Flynn died on April 13, 1964, at the age of 81.

== Publications ==
=== Articles ===
- "Edward L. Bernays: The Science of Ballyhoo". The Atlantic Monthly, May 1932. OCLC 31975427

=== Books ===
- Investments Trusts Gone Wrong!: Wall Street and the Security Markets. New York: New Republic, 1930.
  - Reprinted: New York: Arno Press, 1975. ISBN 978-0405069550
- Graft in Business.... New York: Vanguard Press, 1931. 318 pages.
- God's Gold: The Story of Rockefeller and His Times. New York: Harcourt, Brace & Company, 1932.
- Country Squire in the White House. New York: Doubleday, 1940.
- Men of Wealth: The Story of Twelve Significant Fortunes from the Renaissance to the Present Day. New York: Simon & Schuster, 1941.
- Meet Your Congress. New York: Doubleday, 1944.
- As We Go Marching. New York: Doubleday, 1944.
- The Epic of Freedom Philadelphia: Fireside Press, 1947.
- The Roosevelt Myth. New York: Devin-Adair Publishing Company, 1948.
  - Spanish: El Mito de Roosevelt Barcelona: Libreria Imperis, 1948.
- The Road Ahead: America's Creeping Revolution. (PDF) New York: Devin-Adair Publishing Company, 1949.
- Communists and the New Deal: Part II New York: American Mercury, 1952. OCLC 48432109
- The Lattimore Story. New York: Devin-Adair Publishing Company, 1953. Also available from HathiTrust. This book concerns the Orientalist and writer Owen Lattimore.
- While You Slept: Our Tragedy in Asia and Who Made It. New York: Devin-Adair Publishing Company, 1953.
- America's Unknown War: The War We Have Not Begun to Fight America's Future, 1953.
- McCarthy: His War on American Reds, and the Story of Those Who Oppose Him. 1954.
- The Decline of the American Republic and How to Rebuild It. New York: Devin-Adair Publishing Company, 1955. 212 pages. ISBN 978-9991109596
- Fifty Million Americans in Search of a Party. 1955.

=== Book reviews ===
- "America's Day of Infamy". Review of The Final Secret of Pearl Harbor, by Rear Admiral R. A. Theobald. The Freeman, May 1954. (pp. 26–27)

=== Pamphlets ===
- The Truth About Pearl Harbor. Great Britain: Strickland Press, 1945.
- The Final Secret of Pearl Harbor October 1945. Reproduced in Bartlett, Bruce R. Cover-Up
- The Thought Police: An Episode in Radical Bigotry. New York: John T. Flynn, 1946. OCLC 41228543
- The Smear Terror New York: John T. Flynn, 1947. 30 pages. Originally published serially in the Chicago Tribune, beginning Sunday, January 12, 1947. OCLC 2286808
- Betrayal at Yalta. America's Future, 1955. OCLC 43098261
- Militarism: The New Slavery for America America's Future, 1955. 15 pages. OCLC 40170709
- John T. Flynn Replies to his Critics. New York: John T. Flynn, 195-. OCLC 10214960

=== Published posthumously ===
- Forgotten Lessons: Selected Essays of John T. Flynn. New York: The Foundation for Economic Education, 1996. 199 pages. ISBN 978-1572460157
