= Elizabeth Rivers =

English artist based in Ireland

- Elizabeth Rivers
- Born: 5 August 1903; Sawbridgeworth, Hertfordshire
- Died: 20 July 1964 (aged 60); Dalkey, County Dublin
- Education: Goldsmiths' College; Royal Academy Schools; École nationale supérieure des beaux-arts

Elizabeth Joyce Rivers (5 August 1903 – 20 July 1964) was an English painter, engraver, illustrator and author, based in Ireland for most of her life.

== Life ==
Born in Sawbridgeworth, Hertfordshire in England on 5 August 1903, she was a member of the family of Thomas Rivers (nurseryman). Rivers was educated at Goldsmiths' College, London where she worked under Edmund J. Sullivan. In 1926 she won a scholarship to the Royal Academy Schools, where she continued her training under Walter Sickert, winning several prizes. In 1929 she entered for the Prix de Rome at the British School at Rome, and was exhibited at the Imperial Institute, in London, in 1930. She moved to Paris in 1931 to continue her art education at the École de fresques (of the École nationale supérieure des beaux-arts) with André Lhote and Gino Severini. By 1932 she was considered part of the 'Twenties Group´ and had exhibition work shown in the Wertheim Gallery in London.

In 1935 she made her first visit to Ireland to join her Royal Academy Schools contemporary, Amy Elton, to paint and run a guest-house on Inishmore in the Aran Islands. She then lived on the island from 1936 to 1943 and her first book This Man, published by The Guyon House Press in 1939, was written while she was in Aran. She also wrote a book titled Stranger in Aran published in 1946 by the Cuala Press, republished in 1971 by Peter Owen. She had exhibitions at the Royal Hibernian Academy. A portfolio of her wood engravings was published by the Waddington Galleries. Except for a short period during the Second World War and from 1957-1959 when she lived in Cornwall, Rivers lived in Ireland where she also worked with Evie Hone for designs for stained glass. During the Second World War she lived in London and worked as a fire warden during the blitz. She also exhibited in the New English Art Club and the Royal Academy Summer Exhibition between 1928 and 1944. She also wrote Out of Bondage: Israel, published by Peter Owen in 1957.

While she was living in the west of Ireland she became friends with The White Stag group founder Basil Rakoczi. He commented in a letter in 1942 about her:

"Miss Rivers. Her book 'This Man' is certainly her best work. [...] the strange thing is her ability to draw male nudes—I have never known a woman draw the male body well before ... She ... is awfully interesting though very reserved ... I really think she is a genius mislaid."

Elizabeth Rivers died on 20 July 1964 in her home in Dalkey, County Dublin. She is buried in St. Maelruain's Church, Tallaght.

== Illustrations ==
Rivers created illustrations for other people's books such as:

- Theocritus's Second and Seventh Idylls (1927), translated by Charles Stuart Calverley. Illustrated with woodcuts by Elizabeth Rivers, published by John Lane
- Lord Tennyson's The Day-Dream (1928), published by John Lane
- On the Edge by Walter de la Mare (1930), published by Faber & Faber
- Valley of Graneen by Sean Dorman (1944), published by Peter Davies Ltd
- Connemara Journal by Ethel Mannin (1947), published by Westhouse
- The Man who invented Sin by Seán Ó Faoláin (1948), published by Devin-Adair, New York
- Our Cornwall by C.C. Vyvyan (1948), published by Westaway Books
- The Mad O'Haras, by Patricia Lynch (1948), published by J.M. Dent & Sons, London
- The Wager, and other stories, by Daniel Corkery (1950), published by Devin-Adair, New York
- The Old Place by C.C. Vyvyan ([1952]), published by Museum Press
- The White Hound of the Mountain, and Other Irish Folk Tales, by Thomas J. Kiernan (1962), published by Devin-Adair, New York
- Out of Bedlam, 27 wood-engravings with texts by Christopher Smart (1956), published by the Dolmen Press

Rivers also provided illustrations for the Radio Times and greetings cards published by the Dolmen Press.

== Public collections ==
Rivers's work is in many public collections in the UK (e.g. British Museum, Ashmolean Museum, and Ulster Museum), Ireland (e.g. National Library of Ireland, which holds an archive of her papers, National Gallery of Ireland, and Crawford Art Gallery in Cork), USA (e.g. Paul Mellon Centre, Yale University and Wake Forest University, North Carolina), and Canada (e.g. University of Waterloo).
