= Thomas Rivers (nurseryman) =

English nurseryman

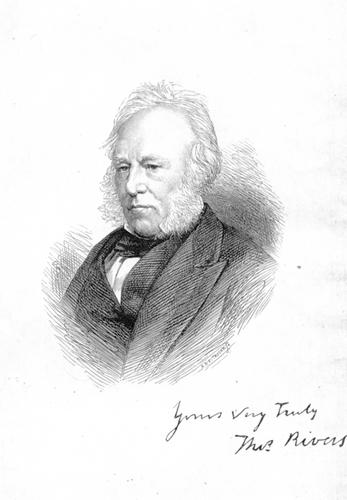
Thomas Rivers, 1873 drawing

Thomas Rivers (1798–1877) was an English nurseryman, known for developing new varieties of roses and fruits.

== Life ==
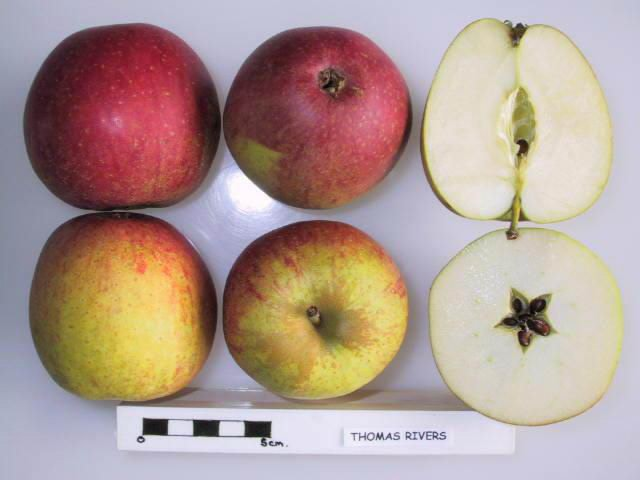
Cross section of the Thomas Rivers apple, National Fruit Collection

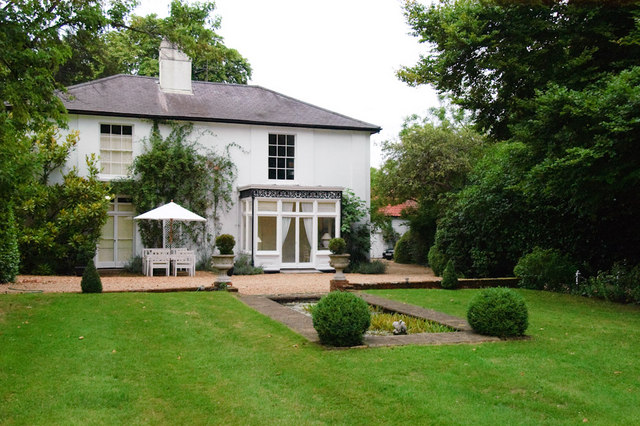
Bonks Hill House, Rivers's home

The son of Thomas and Jane Rivers of Sawbridgeworth, Hertfordshire, he was born there on 27 December 1798. His ancestor John Rivers from Berkshire, established the Rivers family nurseries at Sawbridgeworth in 1725. On the retirement of his father in 1827, Rivers concentrated on the cultivation of roses.

As a practical nurseryman, by the introduction of the "Early Rivers" plum, Rivers both extended the fruit season and enabled British fruit-growers to compete with European rivals. He also developed small fruit trees, and in 1854 took part in founding the British Pomological Society.

Rivers died at Bonks Hill, Sawbridgeworth, on 17 October 1877, and was buried at Sawbridgeworth.

== Works ==
Rivers published:

- Catalogue of Roses, 1833.
- The Rose Amateur's Guide 1837, 11th edition 1877.
- Miniature Fruit Garden; or the Culture of Pyramidal Fruit Trees, 1840, 20th edition 1891.
- The Orchard House; or the Cultivation of Fruit Trees in Pots under Glass, 1850; 5th edition, 1858; 6th edition, 1859;16th edition edited by his son T. F. Rivers, 1879.

He also contributed to gardening journals, beginning with a paper on apple cultivation in Loudon's Gardener's Magazine in 1827.

== Family ==
By his marriage in 1827 to Mary Ann, Rivers had two sons and four daughters. His son Thomas Francis Rivers took over the family business and edited his father's works. It was Thomas Francis Rivers who introduced the Conference pear. His granddaughter, Thomas Francis's daughter May Rivers, was a notable botanical illustrator. His great-granddaughter was the artist Elizabeth Rivers (1903–1964), who won a scholarship to the Royal Academy Schools.
