= Rivers Nursery =

British horticultural company (1725–1987)

Coordinates: 51°48′35″N 0°7′55″E

The Rivers Nursery (also known as Rivers and Son) was a nursery founded in 1725 near Sawbridgeworth and closed in the 1980s. It specialised in fruit trees and roses and is best known for developing the Conference pear. The plant breeders who ran the nursery corresponded with leading scientists and horticulturalists of their times. Rivers Nursery was believed to be the oldest nursery in Britain before its closure.

== History ==
The Rivers Nursery was established by John Rivers in 1725. It specialised in fruit trees (especially in pots), roses, and "orchard houses" made of glass after the 1845 abolition of the glass tax.

The Rivers Nursery became second only to the local maltings as a local employer. Work was gendered, with men preparing the soil, planting, staking, digging and packing, and women pollinating, tying in and grafting.

At its peak in the late 19th century, the nursery covered around 400 acres of land. By the 1950s, there were 300 acres of orchards. Rivers was considered a "giant of the Victorian era" and a main rival to Bunyard's Royal Nursery and Laxton Brothers.

The Nursery used catalogues to advertise products and offered an advisory service to make identifications and recommendations.

Rivers Nursery often exhibited at Royal Horticultural Society shows, and won gold medals. These shows were also opportunities for staff to be recruited.

Sawbridgeworth railway station, opened in 1842, enabled plants to be moved quickly from the nursery and aided trade. Prior to this, in the 1830s, the Duke of Bedford chose to work with the Norwich Nursery instead of Rivers, who were closer to his estate, because Norwich could arrange for cheaper transportation via the canals.

=== Plants and innovations ===
Rivers Nursery were responsible for introducing British long-flowering roses.

==== Soft fruit ====
Thousands of soft fruit trees were cultivated every year at the Nursery when it was at its peak. Rivers's Early Prolific was bred in 1834 by Thomas Rivers. Czar was a nearly black plum named after Alexander II of Russia who had visited Britain in 1874, the year that it was introduced. Rivers's president plum was one of the most popular varieties in California in the 1920s.

In 1950, the Ministry of Agriculture acknowledged England's "indebtedness to the Rivers Family" for their work breeding peaches.

==== Pears and apples ====
Rivers were particularly known for their pears. Fertility and Conference pears were some of the first developed in Britain that rivalled the popularity of French pears, which had dominated orchards from around the 1200s. Conference was displayed by Thomas Francis Rivers at the 1885 Apple and Pear Conference at the RHS garden in Chiswick. Conference accounts for the majority of British pear production into the 21st century.

In 1906 Rivers advertised 161 varieties of apple.

=== 20th century decline and closure ===
During World War I and World War II, Rivers had labour shortages and land was requisitioned for growing food crops. In the post-war period, the Nursery sought to run a garden centre but this was not successful.

In 1985, the Nursery was struggling to compete and was sold for development and finally closed in 1987. Most of the orchard land was dug up.

== Influence and legacy ==
In the late 1860s, Charles Darwin corresponded with the Rivers family about bud variations and plant breeding experiments.

For over 70 years, Audley End House regularly purchased from Rivers Nursery. The orchard house at Audley was designed by the second Thomas Rivers and stocked with Rivers fruit trees. Lord Braybrooke wanted it both for growing and as a space to walk without being outside. A replica was built in 2001. Architect Philip Webb also used fruit trees and grapevines from Rivers.

Many of the National Collections of grapevines came from Rivers Nurseries, who collected as well as breeding.

In 1984, The Times reported that Rivers Nursery was the oldest nursery in Britain.

By the 2010s, volunteers cultivated the Rivers Nursery Orchard, which was around 5 acres in size with 700 trees and sought to preserve diverse varieties of fruit. The 300th anniversary was celebrated in 2025.

== Rivers family ==
At least eight generations of the Rivers family worked the nursery. Members of the Rivers family involved in the business or related fields included:

- John Rivers, founder of the business.
- Thomas Rivers (1770 – 1844) ran the nursery from 1792. Specialised in roses and published a catalogue in 1833.
- Thomas Rivers (1798 – 17 October 1877) ran the Nursery from 1827. Interested in roses and fruit. Notable contributions to gardening journals. Founder of the British Pomological Society in 1854.
- Thomas Francis Rivers (1830 – 17 August 1899) ran the Nursery from 1872, known for introducing the Conference pear.
- May Rivers, botanical illustrator specialising in fruit identification.
