= Norman Beasley =

American journalist (1887–1963)

- Born: April 6, 1887; Michigan
- Died: July 2, 1963 (aged 76); New York
- Occupations: Journalist, author

Norman Beasley (April 6, 1887 – July 2, 1963) was an American journalist and author, best known for writing biographies. He also served in the United States Army as a colonel.

== Career ==
Norman Beasley was born in Detroit, Michigan, where his parents had moved just before his birth.

Beasley's writing career began after graduating from Detroit College of Law, working as a journalist for The Detroit Journal, and later for The Dearborn News.

He began writing books on history in the late 1920s, publishing Men, money, and motors: the drama of the automobile through Harper & Brothers in 1929. His biographical works would include books on William S. Knudsen, Frank Knox, Mary Baker Eddy, and Carter Glass, which was co-written with Rixey Smith.

Beasley's book on William Knudsen, a leading automotive industry executive and general during World War II, is the only book-length work focused solely him and covering his entire life, and contains an introduction by Knudsen himself. However, other books exist focusing on Knudsen's work at Ford Motor Company. The book was authorized by the Knudsen family shortly before Knudsen's death. It was reprinted in 2011 by Literary Licensing, LLC.

Beasley's writings on The First Church of Christ, Scientist are notable for two reasons. First, they are among a handful of books on the subject neither written by a member of the church nor by someone attacking the church, but, as one review puts it, "dispassionately" from a historical perspective. Secondly, the historical accounts do not end where most historical accounts end in 1910 with the passing of founder Mary Baker Eddy, but continue into the 1950s and cover the growth of the church doing that period. He wrote three books covering the topic, they are not authorized church literature sold in the church's Reading Rooms however.

A small controversy arose around Beasley's book The Cross and the Crown when Bliss Knapp accused Beasley of copying some passages related to his parents from his own book Ira Oscar Knapp and Flavia Stickney Knapp. The matter was settled out of court and the passages were removed from further printings.

In 1950, James Cash Penney, the founder of J. C. Penney, especially thanked Beasley for his book Main Street merchant; the story of the J.C. Penney Company while writing his own autobiography.

== Personal life ==
Norman Beasley was a member of the Presbyterian church. He had one child, named Norman Baird.

== Published works ==
- Men, money, and motors: the drama of the automobile (New York: Harper & Brothers, 1929)
- Freighters of fortune; the story of the Great Lakes (New York, Harper & Brothers, 1930)
- Men working; a story of the Goodyear tire & rubber co. (New York and London: Harper & brothers, 1931)
- Frank Knox, American; a short biography (Garden City, N.Y: Doubleday, Doran & Company, inc., 1936)
- Texas, the Lone star state (Garden City, N. Y.: Doubleday, Doran & company, inc., 1936)
- Michigan, the Wolverine state (Garden City, N.Y.: Doubleday, Doran and company, inc., 1936)
- Carter Glass; a biography with Rixey Smith (New York: Longmans, Green and co., 1939)
- Knudsen: a Biography (New York: Whittlesey House, 1947), ISBN 978-1-934044-01-8
- Main Street merchant; the story of the J.C. Penney Company (New York: Whittlesey House, 1948)
- Politics has no morals (New York: Scribner, 1949)
- The cross and the crown (New York: Duell, Sloan and Pearce, 1952)
- The continuing spirit (London: Allen & Unwin, 1957)
- Made in Detroit (New York: Putnam, 1957)
- For the years to come; a story of International Nickel of Canada with John F. Thompson (New York: Putnam, 1960)
- Mary Baker Eddy (New York: Duell, Sloan, and Pearce, 1963)
