= Devin-Adair Publishing Company =

American conservative publishing house (1911–1981)

- Status: Defunct
- Founded: 1911
- Founder: Henry Garrity
- Country of origin: United States
- Publication types: books

The Devin-Adair Publishing Company (1911–1981) was an American conservative publishing house.

== History ==
Henry Garrity created the publishing house in 1911 in New York City.

His son Devin Garrity inherited it in 1939. It moved from New York City to Old Greenwich, Connecticut, in 1970.

Devin Garrity was also featured in the ABC television series, Answers for Americans, which aired briefly in the 1953–1954 television season.

Originally known for publication of Irish poetry and books on popular ornithology, Devin-Adair began to focus on anti-Communist, conservative, and libertarian books for the political movement that eventuated in the election of President Ronald Reagan. The principal publishers of such books were Devin-Adair, Caxton Publishers (Idaho), Henry Regnery Company (Chicago), Western Islands (Boston), and Arlington House (Connecticut). Garrity managed to have friends across the broad spectrum of the American right from Human Events and National Review to The Freeman, American Opinion, The Review of the News, and Conservative Digest.

== Titles ==
Irish titles:

- J. Breckenridge Ellis: The Woodneys: An American Family (1914)
- Humphrey Joseph Desmond: Why God Loves the Irish (1918)
- Sean O'Faolain: The Man Who Invented Sin and Other Stories (1948)
- Sean O'Faolain: The Irish: A Character Study (1949)
- Sean O'Faolain: A Summer in Italy (1950)
- Daniel Corkery: The Wager, and Other Stories, illustrated by Elizabeth Rivers (1950)
- Sean O'Faolain: The Short Story (1951)
- Sean O'Faolain: Newman's Way': The Odyssey of John Henry Newman (1952)
- Sean O'Faolain: An Autumn in Italy (1953)
- Thomas J. Kiernan: The White Hound of the Mountain, and Other Irish Folk Tales, illustrated by Elizabeth Rivers (1962)

Anti-communist titles:

- The Roosevelt Myth (1948)
- The Road Ahead: America's Creeping Revolution (1949)
- While You Slept: Our Tragedy in Asia and Who Made It (1951)
- Elizabeth Bentley: Out of Bondage: The Elizabeth Bentley Story (1951)
- Frank Chodorov: One Is a Crowd (1952)
- The Lattimore Story (1955)
- The Decline of the American Republic, and How to Rebuild It (1955)
- Bernardo Teixeira: The Fabric of Terror: Three Days in Angola (1965)
- Julius Epstein: Operation Keelhaul: The Story of Forced Repatriation from 1944 to the Present (1973)

American Naturalists Series titles:

- John Burroughs' America: Selections from the Writings of the Hudson River Naturalist (1952)
- Ernest Thompson Seton's America: Selections from the Writings of the Artist-Naturalist (1954)
- Theodore Roosevelt's America. Selections from the Writings of the Oyster Bay Naturalist (1955)
- John and William Bartram's America: Selections from the Writings of the Philadelphia Naturalists (1957)
- A Naturalist in Alaska by Adolph Murie (1961)
- Other Edens: The Sketchbook of an Artist Naturalist by John Henry Dick (1979)
