= Conference pear =

Variety of pear

Conference
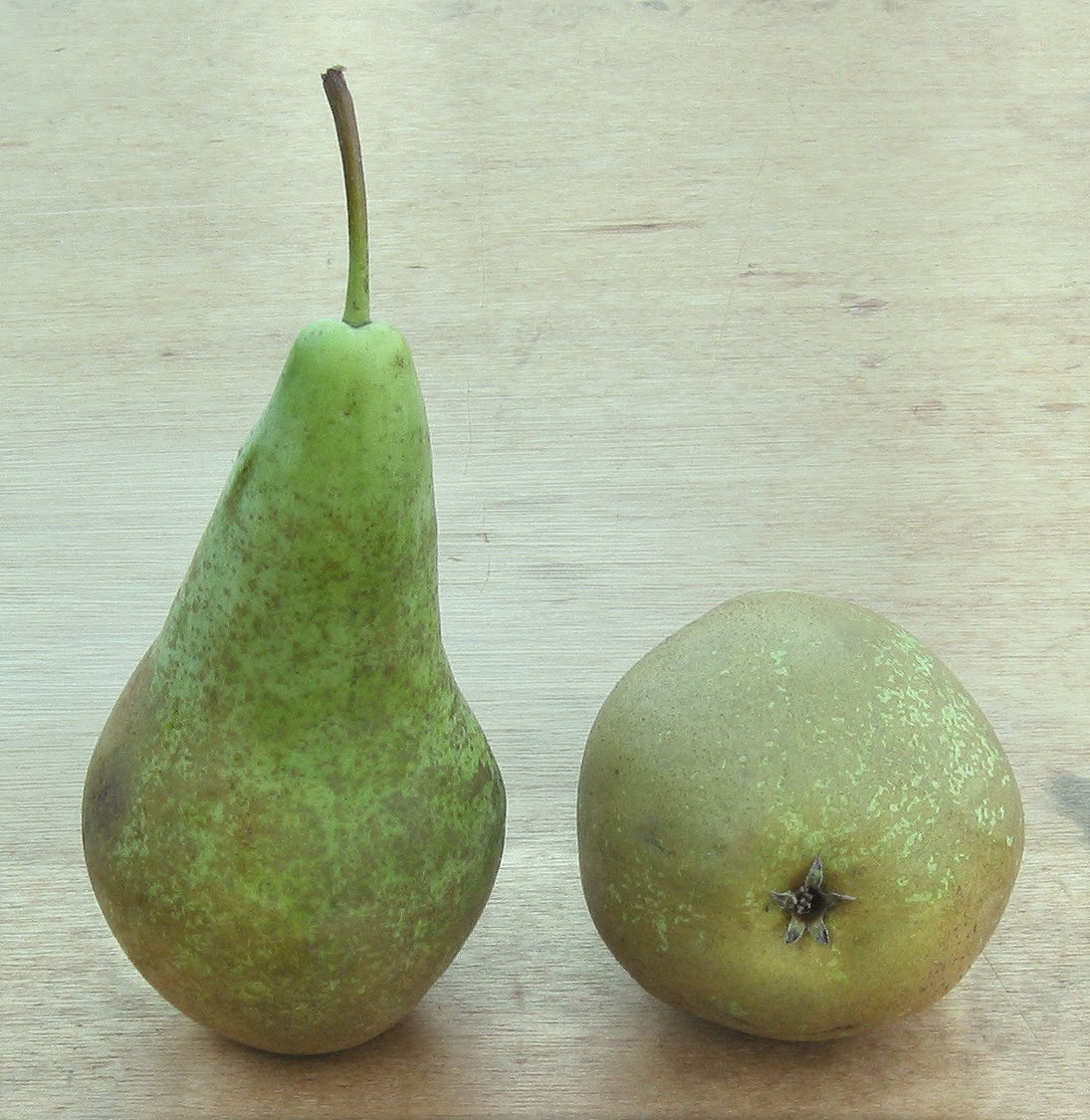
- Conference pear
- Genus: Pyrus
- Species: Pyrus communis
- Cultivar: 'Conference'
- Breeder: Thomas Rivers
- Origin: Great Britain

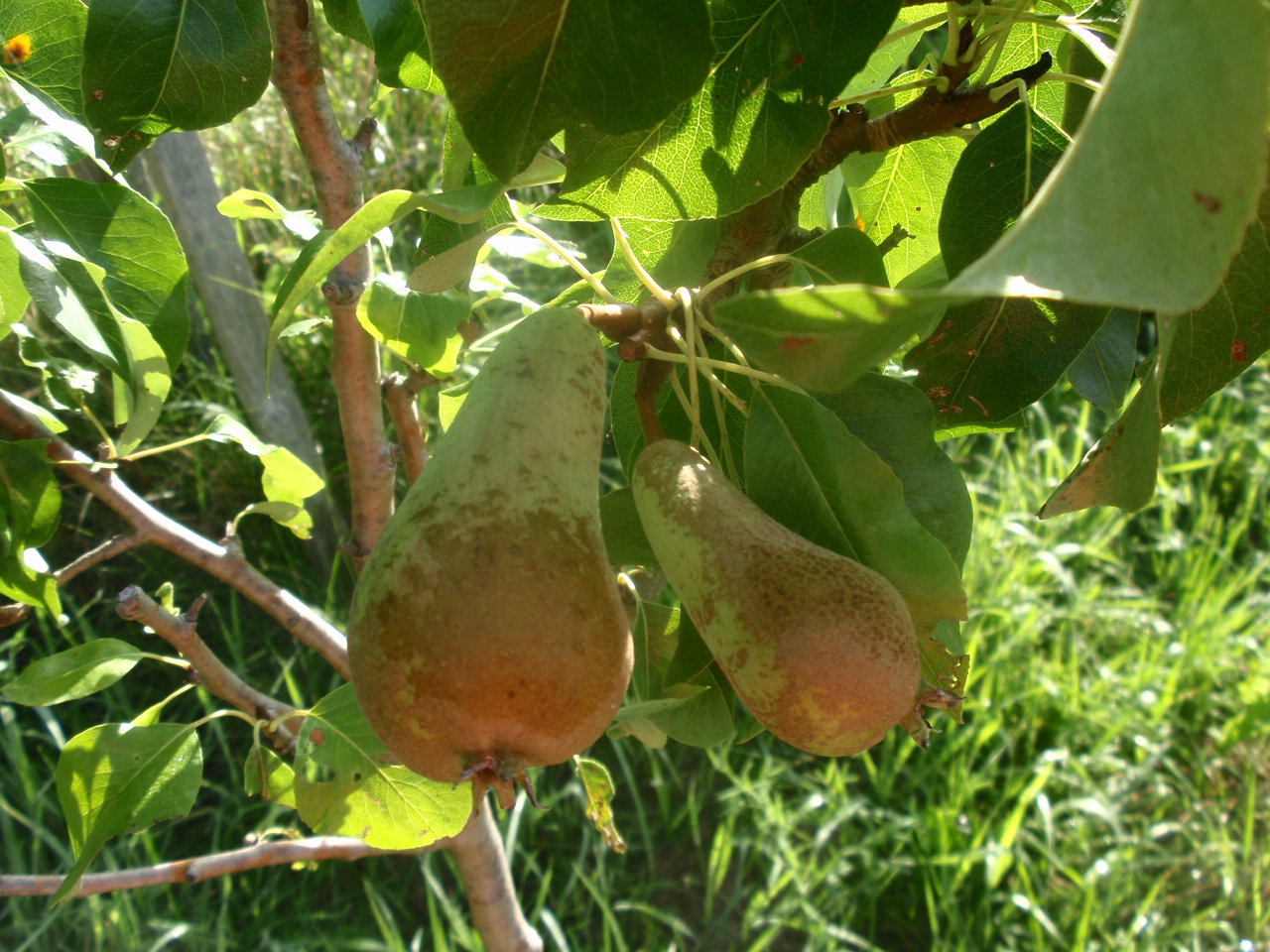
Conference pear

A Conference pear is a variety of pear. It is an autumn cultivar of the European pear (Pyrus communis). The variety was developed in Britain by Thomas Francis Rivers from his Rivers Nursery in Sawbridgeworth, Hertfordshire. Its name derives from the National British Pear Conference in London in 1885, where it won first prize.

== Description ==
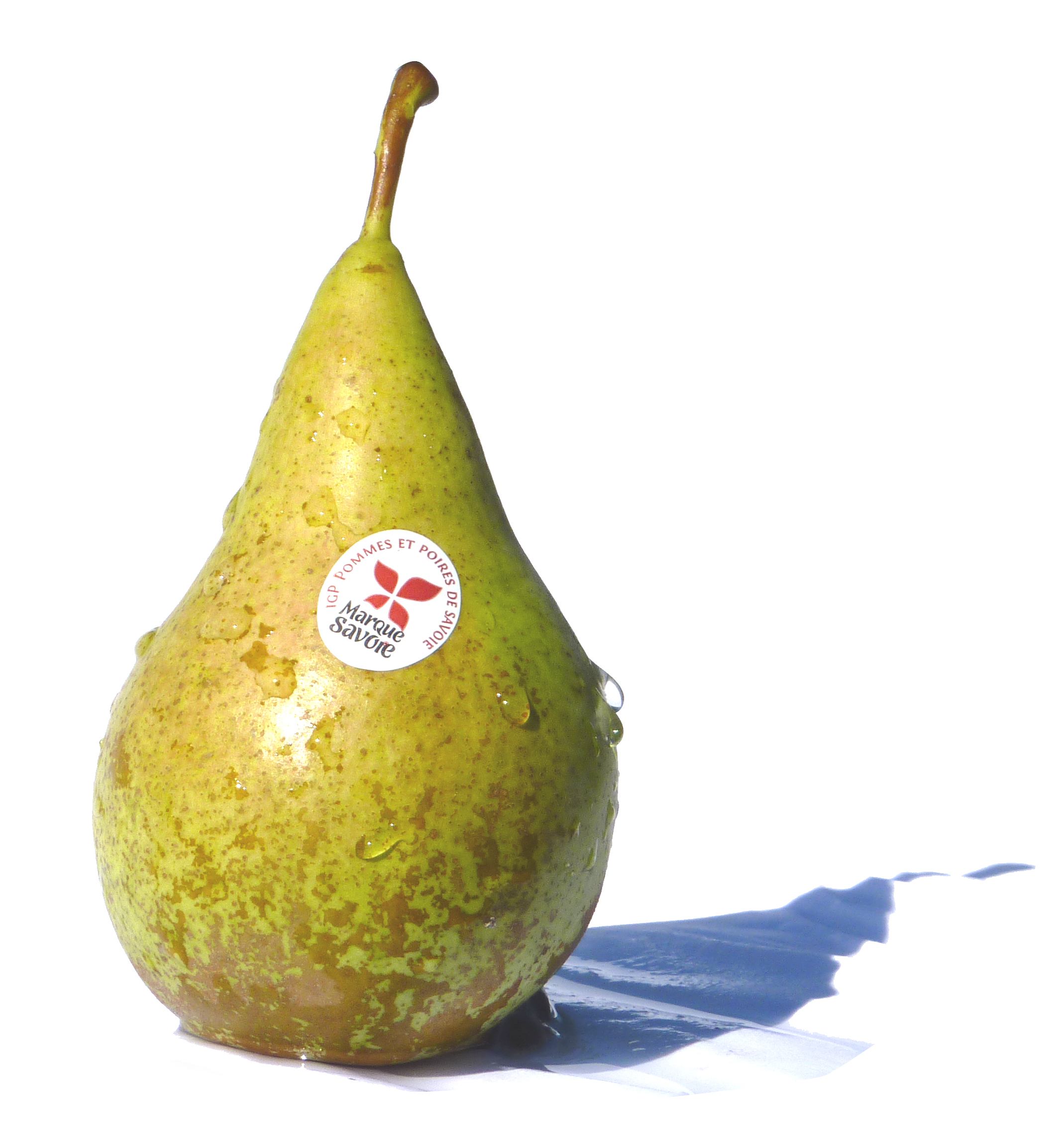
Conference pear from Savoie

A medium-sized pear with an elongated bottle shape, the Conference pear is similar in appearance to the 'Bosc pear'. A table pear, it is suitable for fresh-cut processing. The fruit skin is thick greenish-brown, becoming pale yellow when ripe. The flesh is white, but turns pale yellow when the pear is ripe. The texture is very fine and soft, and the flavour is sweet. The brown part of the skin is called russet or russetting; it is more or less apparent depending on weather conditions.

== Cultivation and production ==
The Conference pear adapts to a variety of conditions, and is widely grown in Europe. It thrives on land that is sunny, rich and not too chalky. In France, the production areas of this variety are mostly in the north (Loire, North Picardy) and the Alps (Savoie and the little Southern Alps). It is grown commercially in many areas of the United Kingdom and accounts for around 90% of UK pears.

Production will be enhanced by the nearby presence of pollinating varieties such as the Williams pear. It is a particularly resistant fruit, especially against scab. The Conference pear can be eaten until January if kept cool in a refrigerator or cellar ventilated.

There is strong sales competition in Europe from neighbouring countries (in order: Netherlands, Belgium, Spain and Italy). The flavour of Conference pears grown in Savoie, was recognized in 1996 by a PGI (a Protected Geographical Indication) in the European Union, and 2012 it was the only PGI obtained by a pear in France.

== Mutants ==
Some mutants of the Conference pear are grown commercially as club varieties. These include:

- Corina, a mutant of Conference, which is suited to earlier picking, although with smaller fruit size.
- Red Conference, a red color mutation with growing popularity.

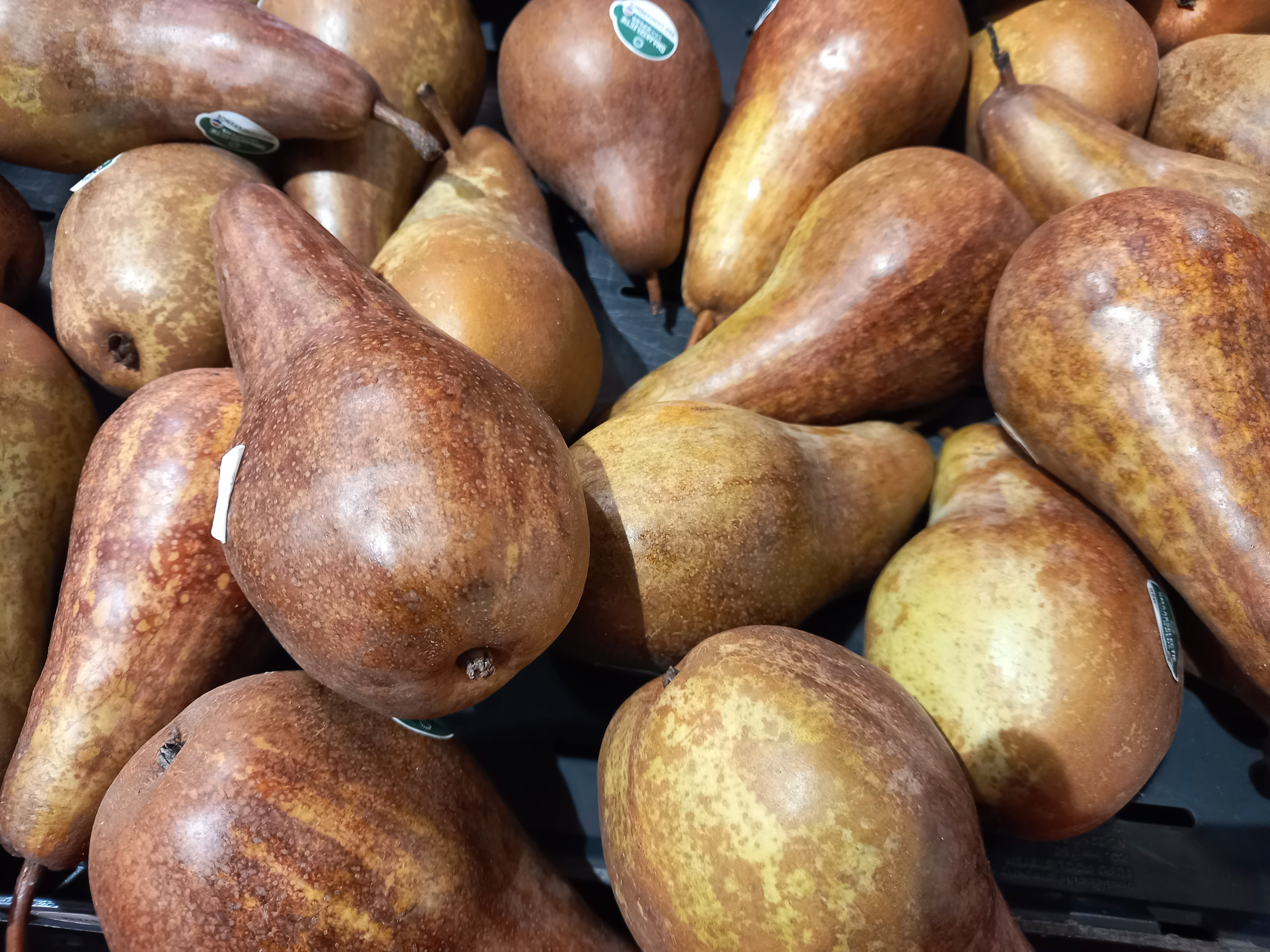
Red Conference pears at a Dutch greengrocer
