= Northern and Eastern Railway =

Overview
- Locale: Essex, Middlesex and Hertfordshire, England
- Dates of operation: 1840–1902
- Successor: Great Eastern Railway

Technical
- Track gauge: 4 ft 8 1/2 in (1,435 mm)
- Previous gauge: 5 ft (1,524 mm)

The Northern & Eastern Railway (N&ER) was an early British railway company, that planned to build a line from London to York. Its ambition was cut successively back, and it was only constructed from Stratford, east of London, to the towns of Bishop's Stortford and Hertford. It was always short of money, and it got access to London over the Eastern Counties Railway (ECR). It was built at the track gauge of 5 ft (1,524 mm), but it converted to standard gauge in 1844.

Its main line opened progressively between 1840 and 1842. It was worked by the neighbouring ECR, and it leased its network to that company in from the beginning of 1844 for 999 years. From that time it was a financial company only, it amalgamated with the ECR's successor, the Great Eastern Railway, in 1902.

The entire network is still in use and is now electrified, and part of the original main line now forms a section of the West Anglia Main Line between London Liverpool Street and Cambridge.

== Proposals ==
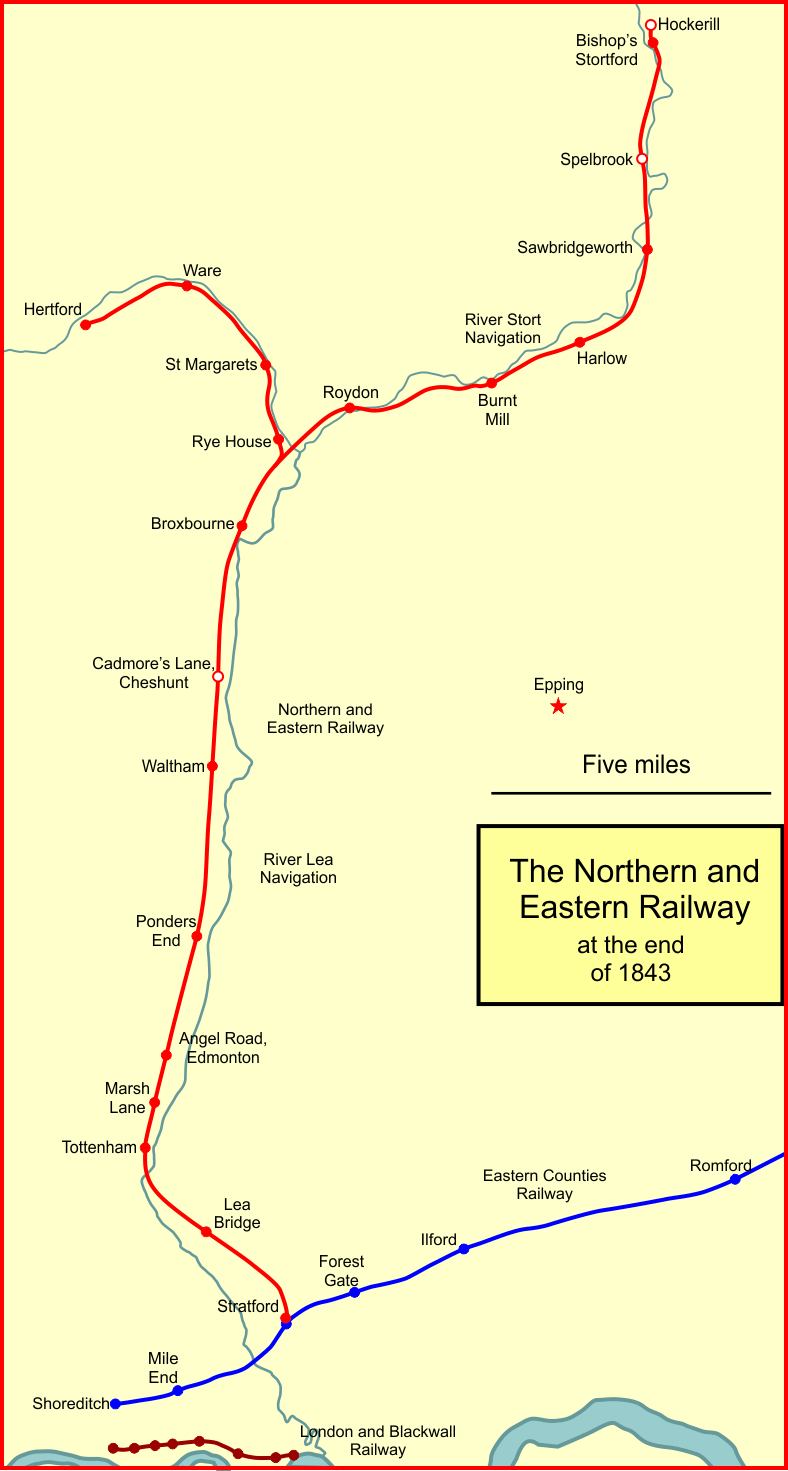
The Northern and Eastern Railway network at the end of 1843

When the Stockton and Darlington Railway was opened in 1825, great enthusiasm for railway transport was generated. A number of schemes were put forward for connecting London and York, and some of these were planned to pass through Cambridge. A canal engineer, Nicholas Wilcox Cundy, surveyed such a line, to be known as the Grand Northern & Eastern Railway, in 1834, and the following year another survey was made, by Joseph Gibbs, for another line from London through Cambridge to York. This scheme went to Parliament in the 1836 session as a proposed "Great Northern Railway" (nothing to do with the subsequent Great Northern Railway a decade later). The 1836 proposal was rejected by Parliament.

Northern and Eastern Railway Act 1836
- Act of Parliament
- Parliament of the United Kingdom
- Long title: An Act for making a Railway to form a Communication between London and Cambridge, with a view to its being extended hereafter to the Northern and Eastern Counties of England.
- Citation: 6 & 7 Will. 4. c. ciii

Dates
- Royal assent: 4 July 1836

Text of statute as originally enacted

Meanwhile, a public meeting was held at Cambridge Town Hall on 23 January 1836, at which it was decided to support a route surveyed by James Walker. A bill for a Northern & Eastern Railway was prepared; it was to run from London to Cambridge, with a branch from a little south of Cambridge to Newmarket, Norwich and Great Yarmouth. The extension from Cambridge to Lincoln was not included, as the surveys had not been completed. The bill was passed as the Northern and Eastern Railway Act 1836 (6 & 7 Will. 4. c. ciii), but the route was cut back to run from London to Cambridge only; it received royal assent on 4 July 1836. Authorised share capital was £1,200,000. Although the construction cost was large, the company was confident of a 16% return.

== The London terminus, and track gauge ==
The N&ER was to have its London terminus at Islington. The topography was such that this would have required tunnelling to reach it, and it was realised that this was an expensive proposition. An approach was made to the Commercial Railway (later the London and Blackwall Railway) with a view to using its final approach to London and Minories terminus. This was unsuccessful, so the ECR was contacted, with a view to using its Shoreditch terminus. This was agreed to, and Parliament ratified the arrangement, so the N&ER's planned line was rerouted south of Tottenham to join the ECR at Stratford. The rental for this arrangement was to be £7,000 a year, with an additional charge per passenger. The ECR agreed to build a separate terminus at Shoreditch for the N&ER.

When the ECR determined its track gauge of 5 ft (1,524 mm), the N&ER had to adopt the same gauge in order to use the approach tracks. The first section of the ECR was opened on 18 June 1839, from a temporary terminus at Mile End to another temporary terminus at Romford.

== Contract award, and a retrenchment of scope ==
At the end of 1837 a contract for construction of the line was awarded to David Macintosh. In March 1838 construction began, with Michael Borthwick as resident engineer. From the beginning, the N&ER was unable to raise the capital it needed for building its line. By May 1837 the contractor was in difficulties, and Robert Stephenson was appointed as engineer-in-chief, with Borthwick continuing as resident engineer. George Parker Bidder was appointed as the new contractor. Engineering contractors Grissell and Peto were approached late in 1837 about building the line as far as Bishop's Stortford. In March 1840 they started work between Stratford and Tottenham, and finally took over the work between Tottenham and Broxbourne from David McIntosh.

Northern and Eastern Railway Act 1840
- Act of Parliament
- Parliament of the United Kingdom
- Long title: An Act to enable the Northern and Eastern Railway Company to abandon a Portion of the Line originally authorized to be made; and to alter and amend several of the Powers and Provisions of the Acts relating to the said Railway.
- Citation: 3 & 4 Vict. c. lii

Dates
- Royal assent: 4 June 1840

Text of statute as originally enacted

The N&ER company obtained a further act of Parliament, the Northern and Eastern Railway Act 1840 (3 & 4 Vict. c. lii), which received royal assent on 4 June 1840; the line beyond Bishop's Stortford to Cambridge was abandoned, and the share capital was reduced to £720,000.

== Opening ==
On 15 September 1840 the N&ER started operation between the ECR's Stratford station and Broxbourne, a distance of about 15 miles (24 km). At first this was a single track; it was doubled in 1841. Trains ran through from Shoreditch, but the ECR insisted that Shoreditch to Stratford journeys were exclusive to them.

The line was extended as far as Harlow on 9 August 1841; to Spelbrook (a temporary terminus) on 19 November 1841; and as far as Bishop's Stortford on 16 May 1842.

A criticism of the route of the N&ER was that the line followed the valley of the River Lea, while nearly all of the settlements were on higher ground, and were some distance from their respective stations. Tottenham was used as the railhead for cattle being brought in to London; they were driven on foot from there to the city markets. In the second half of 1842 a dividend of 2% was paid.

== Hertford branch ==
Northern and Eastern Railway Act 1841
- Act of Parliament
- Parliament of the United Kingdom
- Long title: An Act to enable the Northern and Eastern Railway Company to make certain Deviations in the Line of their Railway, and to alter and amend the several Acts relating to the said Railway.
- Citation: 4 & 5 Vict. c. xxiv

Dates
- Royal assent: 18 May 1841

Northern and Eastern Railway (Broxbourne, &c. Branch Line) Act 1841
- Act of Parliament
- Parliament of the United Kingdom
- Long title: An Act to enable the Northern and Eastern Railway Company to make a Branch Line of Railway; and to alter and amend the several Acts relating to the said Railway.
- Citation: 4 & 5 Vict. c. xlii

Dates
- Royal assent: 21 June 1841

In June 1841 royal assent was given to an act of Parliament, the Northern and Eastern Railway (Broxbourne, &c. Branch Line) Act 1841 (4 & 5 Vict. c. xlii) for a branch from Broxbourne to Hertford; it became the present-day Hertford East Branch Line. Work on the Hertford branch line began early in 1843, and it opened as a single track on 31 October 1843. It was doubled in October 1846 (after the lease by the ECR).

== Hockerill ==
The northernmost extent of the line was at Bishop's Stortford, opened before the end of 1843, when the N&ER ceased to control its own network. However a special arrangement was made to receive excursion trains at Hockerill, 1/2 mile (0.8 km) or so north of Bishop's Stortford station. The overbridge at that point today carries Hockerill Street, and Stortford was then a much smaller community; Hockerill was a distinct village. (The later Hockerill Halt station on the Dunmow branch was opened in 1910.) An advertisement in The Times in October 1843 read:

Newmarket Houghton Meeting—A special train, consisting of first-class carriages only, of the Northern and Eastern Railway, stopping only at Tottenham and Broxbourne, will leave the London Terminus, Shoreditch, for Hockerill, Bishop's Stortford, on Monday, 23d inst., at half-past-seven a.m., and return from Hockerill at half-past nine o'clock at night, thereby enabling persons attending Newmarket to see the whole of the races and return to London the same evening. Ample accommodation may be had at Hockerill should parties prefer to send their private horses and carriages the day before to wait the arrival of the trains. Horse and carriages can be taken on at the Tottenham station, thereby avoiding passing through the city. Previous notice should be given by parties taking their own horses and carriages, to prevent the possibility of disappointment. Extra post horses and carriages will be in attendance to convey persons forward, and may be ordered to be in readiness by sending a letter to Messrs. Edwards and Stokes of Hockerill. Places may be secured [to travel] by coaches meeting the train to Newmarket and back, at the Golden Cross, Charing-cross. Fares—Hockerill to Newmarket and back, inside £1 10s, outside £1 1s.

These excursions were advertised to be run on 9 and 11 October 1843, and (after the lease of the N&ER to the ECR) on 15 and 28 October 1844.

== Leased to the Eastern Counties Railway ==
Northern and Eastern Railway Act 1844
- Act of Parliament
- Parliament of the United Kingdom
- Long title: An Act to authorize the letting on Lease to the Eastern Counties Railway Company of the Railways and Works of the Northern and Eastern Railway Company, and to give effect to certain Arrangements entered into by the said Companies, and to amend and enlarge some of the Provisions of the Acts relating to the first-named Company.
- Citation: 7 & 8 Vict. c. xx

Dates
- Royal assent: 23 May 1844

On 25 October 1843 an agreement facilitated by G. P. Bidder was reached by the ECR and N&ER, and from 1 January 1844 the entire N&ER system was leased to the ECR for 999 years; the arrangement was formally ratified by the Northern and Eastern Railway Act 1844 (7 & 8 Vict. c. xx) in May 1844. The ECR was to pay the N&ER 5% annually on the £970,000 capital cost of building the line, and profits would be apportioned. The N&ER continued as a nominally independent company, receiving the lease charges but not operating any railway; eventually it merged into the Great Eastern Railway in 1902.

== Gauge change ==
At the same time as the discussion about the lease took place, the two companies agreed that their uncommon track gauge of 5 ft (1,524 mm) was a hindrance, and they decided to alter it to the British standard gauge of 4 ft 8 1/2 in (1,435 mm). The physical conversion was undertaken between 5 September and 7 October 1844; it was achieved without interruption to the running of trains, except on the Hertford branch.

== Engineering details ==
Whishaw reported that the rails are "of the double parallel form" (that is, not fish-bellied and broadly similar to modern bullhead rail) in lengths of 12 and 15 feet (3.7 and 4.6 m). "The upper and lower webs are not of similar section": Whishaw meant that the head and foot are not identical. The sleepers were of larch, 9 feet (2.7 m) in length, and 10 by 5 inches (25 by 13 cm) in cross section. The ballasting was of gravel, of at least 2 feet (0.6 m) in thickness throughout.

== From 1844 ==
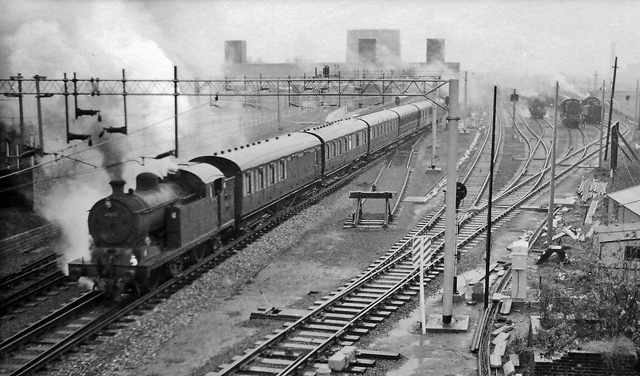
Broxbourne station in 1960

From the first day of 1844, the N&ER was simply a financial shell company, receiving lease charges from the ECR but not having any rail operations of its own. The N&ER network extended from Stratford to Bishop's Stortford and from Broxbourne to Hertford, and it became the stem of the important main line to Cambridge, which was built and owned north of Stortford by the ECR. The approach to London was later altered to run through Hackney Downs, but the Stratford to Copper Mill Junction (Tottenham Hale) section was retained, and became a key link for goods traffic approaching Temple Mills Yard.

In 1849 the ECR opened a branch line from Angel Road to Enfield.

The ECR and certain other companies in the east of England amalgamated to form the Great Eastern Railway (GER) in 1862. The GER adopted a policy of running frequent passenger services on the London suburban lines: in 1864 there were 29 departures per day for the N&ER line. Shoreditch station had been renamed Bishopsgate, but it was obviously inadequate for both main line traffic and N&ER line traffic, and the decision was taken to extend westwards: Liverpool Street station was opened in 1871, with a connection to the underground Metropolitan Railway opening in 1875.

In 1872 a new shorter route towards Broxbourne was opened, from Bethnal Green, near Liverpool Street, via Hackney Downs to Copper Mill Junction, south of Tottenham Hale station. In time this became the dominant route from London. In 1891 the Churchbury loop was opened, from Bury Street Junction via Lower Edmonton to Cheshunt. The area was undeveloped and the sparse train service failed to encourage residential travel. It closed to ordinary passenger trains in 1909.

The N&ER line never became the primary route from London to York (which was the Great Northern Railway's route via Peterborough and Newark), but from 1882 the GER participated with the GNR in a joint railway, the Great Northern and Great Eastern Joint Railway, which gave it access to Doncaster, and by means of running powers to York. A significant flow of coal ran south from Yorkshire to London over the N&ER's line, and for a while an express passenger train, the Cathedrals Express, ran over the route. The cathedrals alluded to were Ely, Peterborough and Lincoln, and the service ran from 1892 to 1918.

== The twentieth century ==
Passenger use of the line intensified in the 20th century, particularly for residential travel as people became accustomed to travelling longer distances in order to live in more rural surroundings. Cambridge too became increasingly significant as a regional centre, attracting express passenger trains over the route. Goods and mineral traffic too remained dominant, although declining steeply after 1955.

Organisationally the N&ER company was absorbed into the GER in 1902; the GER was a constituent of the new London and North Eastern Railway in 1923 (as part of the "grouping" of the railways) and in 1948 the LNER in turn was nationalised.

The Churchbury Loop from Bury Street Junction, near Enfield, and Cheshunt, had been dormant so far as passenger use was concerned, since 1909. In 1960 it was electrified and reopened as part of a new electrified suburban network; the line was retitled the Southbury loop. At first six trains an hour were run, although this was later reduced. The new suburban electric trains ran as far as Bishop's Stortford and Hertford. For the time being the southern part of the N&ER route remained unelectrified, but electrification was provided from May 1969.

The entire network remains in use at the present day. The dominant traffic is on the section between Copper Mill Junction and Bishop's Stortford, part of the route from London Liverpool Street station to Cambridge and Stansted Airport.

== Stations ==
Only stations marked in bold are still in existence.

=== Main line ===
Junction with Eastern Counties Railway main line

- **Stratford**; opened April 1842; combined with ECR station 1 April 1847;
- **Lea Bridge**; opened 15 September 1840; also known as Lea Bridge Road; closed 8 July 1985; reopened 15 May 2016;

Direct line via Hackney Downs (built 1872) converges

- **Tottenham**; opened 15 September 1840; renamed Tottenham Hale after 1875;
- **Marsh Lane** (or Marsh Lane Tottenham); opened 1842; closed after December 1842; reopened June 1843; renamed Park in 1852; renamed Northumberland Park 1923;
- Edmonton; opened 15 September 1840; closed after December 1842; reopened June 1843; renamed Water Lane (Junction); later renamed Angel Road; closed 31 May 2019 and replaced by Meridan Water;

ECR Enfield branch (built 1849) diverges

- **Ponders End**; opened 15 September 1840;
- **Waltham Cross**; opened 15 September 1840; relocated 1885; at times known as simply Waltham, or Waltham Cross and Abbey;
- **Cheshunt**; opened 31 May 1846;
- Cadmores Lane Cheshunt; opened by December 1841; closed after May 1842;
- **Broxbourne**; opened 15 September 1840; renamed Broxbourne Junction; relocated 1960;

Hertford branch diverges

- **Roydon**; opened 9 August 1841;
- **Netteswell**; opened by September 1841; soon renamed Burnt Mill and Netteswell; renamed Burnt Mill 1843; renamed Harlow Town 1960;
- **Harlow**; opened 9 August 1841; renamed Harlow Mill 1960;
- **Sawbridgeworth**; opened 22 November 1841;
- Spelbrook; opened 22 November 1841 as temporary terminus; closed 16 May 1842;
- **Stortford**; opened 16 May 1842; renamed Bishop's Stortford 1845;

Line continues as ECR to Cambridge

- Hockerill; temporary excursion station (on ECR line) in use in October 1843 and October 1844.

=== Hertford branch ===
From Broxbourne:

- **Rye House**; opened privately 1845; opened to public 31 May 1846;
- **St Margarets**; opened 31 October 1843; relocated 3 July 1863;
- **Ware**; opened 31 October 1843;
- **Hertford**; opened 31 October 1843; relocated 27 February 1888; renamed Hertford East 1923; still open.

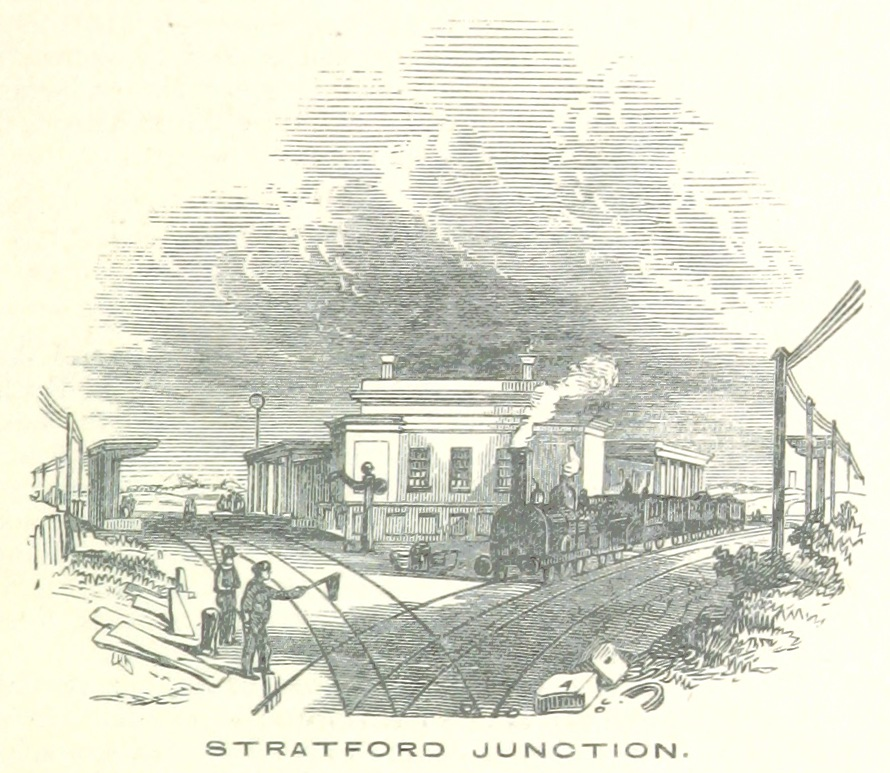
Stratford Junction in 1851

Whishaw reported that "At Shoreditch this Company is accommodated with part of the Eastern Counties station. The intermediate stations already opened to the public are at the Lea Bridge Road, Tottenham, Edmonton, Enfield-Highway and Ponder’s End, Waltham Cross, and Broxbourne." In fact the two parts of Stratford station were to the east of the point of junction; the present day platforms 1 and 2 are on the site of the original N&ER station. The station was approached by Station Road, connecting to Angel Lane. The present-day main entrance in Gibbins Road came much later.

== Locomotives ==
The company purchased 14 2-2-2 locomotives from four builders:

- Robert Stephenson and Company
- Bury, Curtis, and Kennedy
- R. B. Longridge and Company (of Bedlington, Northumberland)
- Charles Tayleur and Co (later Vulcan Foundry)

The locomotives were regauged to standard gauge in September and October 1844.

Whishaw said that "The principal engine-station [depot] is near the Stratford junction."

== Carriages ==
Carriages were 20 feet (6.1 m) long and 7 feet (2.1 m) wide. They had six wheels and were first, second or third class with capacity for 24, 32 and 60 to 70 passengers respectively. They had footboards to allow passengers to board at locations with no or low platforms. The third class carriages were open to the elements.

Whishaw had a comment about the carriages: "The carriages on this line present a novelty in being mounted on six instead of four wheels, except those of the Great Western and Blackwall lines. One of the advantages of this mode of construction is, that the carriages are less likely to run off the line, or to give way by reason of an axle breaking on the journey."

== See also ==
- Eastern Counties Railway
- Great Eastern Railway
