= Broxbourne railway station =

Network Rail station in Hertfordshire, England

Broxbourne
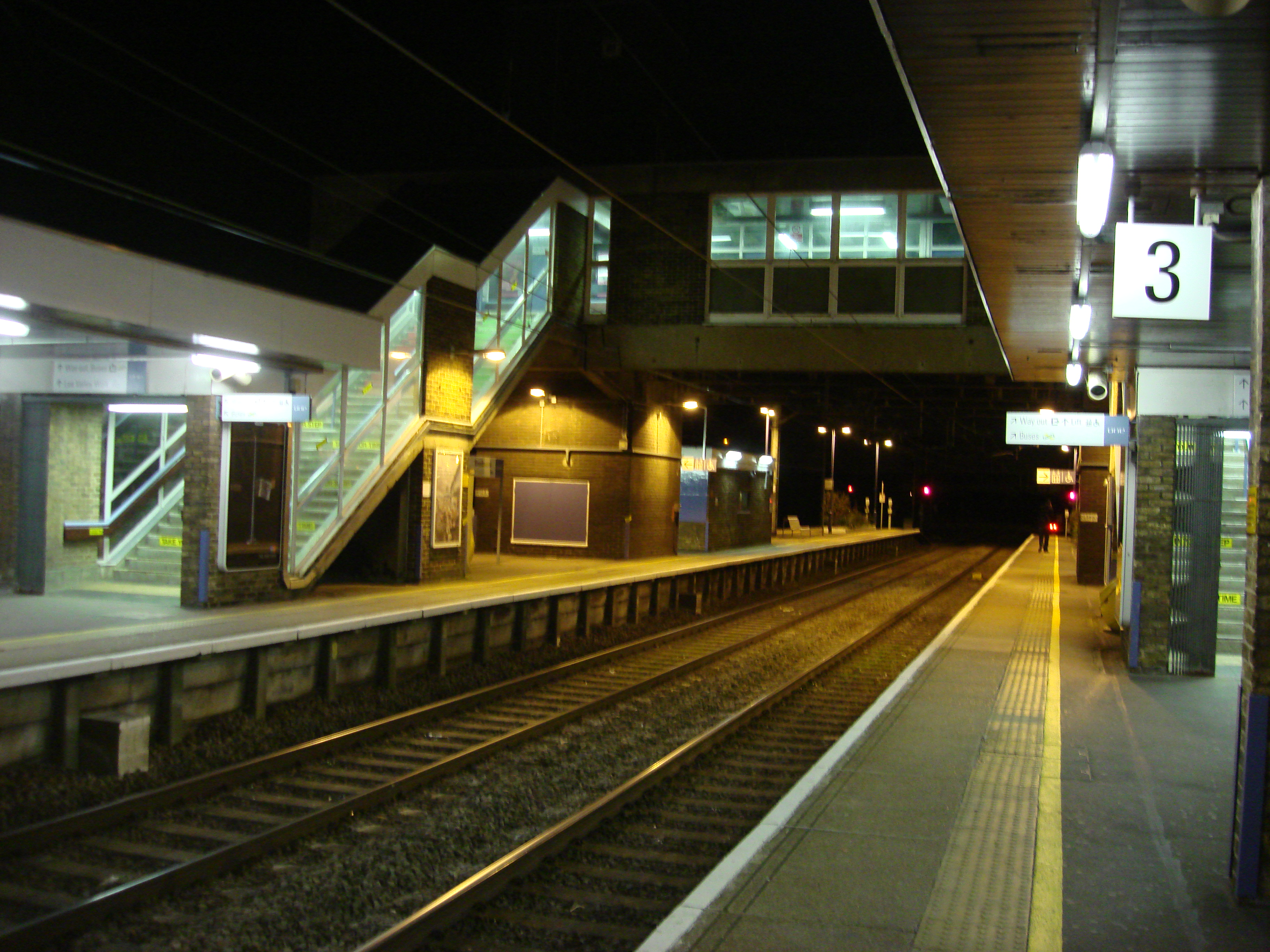
- Interactive map of Broxbourne

General information
- Location: Broxbourne
- Local authority: Borough of Broxbourne
- Grid reference: TL374072
- Managed by: Greater Anglia
- Station code: BXB
- DfT category: C2
- Number of platforms: 4
- Accessible: Yes
- Fare zone: B

National Rail annual entry and exit
- 2020–21: ▼0.389 million
- Interchange: ▼84,032
- 2021–22: ▲1.141 million
- Interchange: ▲0.220 million
- 2022–23: ▲1.376 million
- Interchange: ▲0.285 million
- 2023–24: ▲1.625 million
- Interchange: ▲0.348 million
- 2024–25: ▲1.797 million
- Interchange: ▼0.343 million

Railway companies
- Original company: Northern and Eastern Railway
- Pre-grouping: Great Eastern Railway
- Post-grouping: London and North Eastern Railway

Key dates
- 15 September 1840: Opened as Broxbourne & Hoddesdon
- 4 May 1970: Renamed Broxbourne

Other information
- External links: Departures; Facilities
- Coordinates: 51.747°N 0.011°W

Broxbourne railway station is on the West Anglia Main Line serving the towns of Broxbourne and Hoddesdon in Hertfordshire, England. It is 17 miles 17 chains (27.7 km) down the line from London Liverpool Street and is situated between Cheshunt and Roydon. Its three-letter station code is BXB and it is in fare zone B.

The station and all trains serving it are operated by Greater Anglia.

== History ==
Broxbourne station was officially opened by the Northern and Eastern Railway on 15 September 1840. It was on the company's proposed line to Cambridge, but the next section of the line to Latton Mill (Harlow) was not opened until August 1841. Therefore, for a short period of time Broxbourne was the terminus for the line which ran up the Lea Valley from Stratford Junction, where it joined the Eastern Counties Railway. The original station building was demolished in 1959 and replaced with new buildings designed by H. H. Powell, of the British Railways Eastern Region Architects' Department with T. Rainier as the Project Architect.

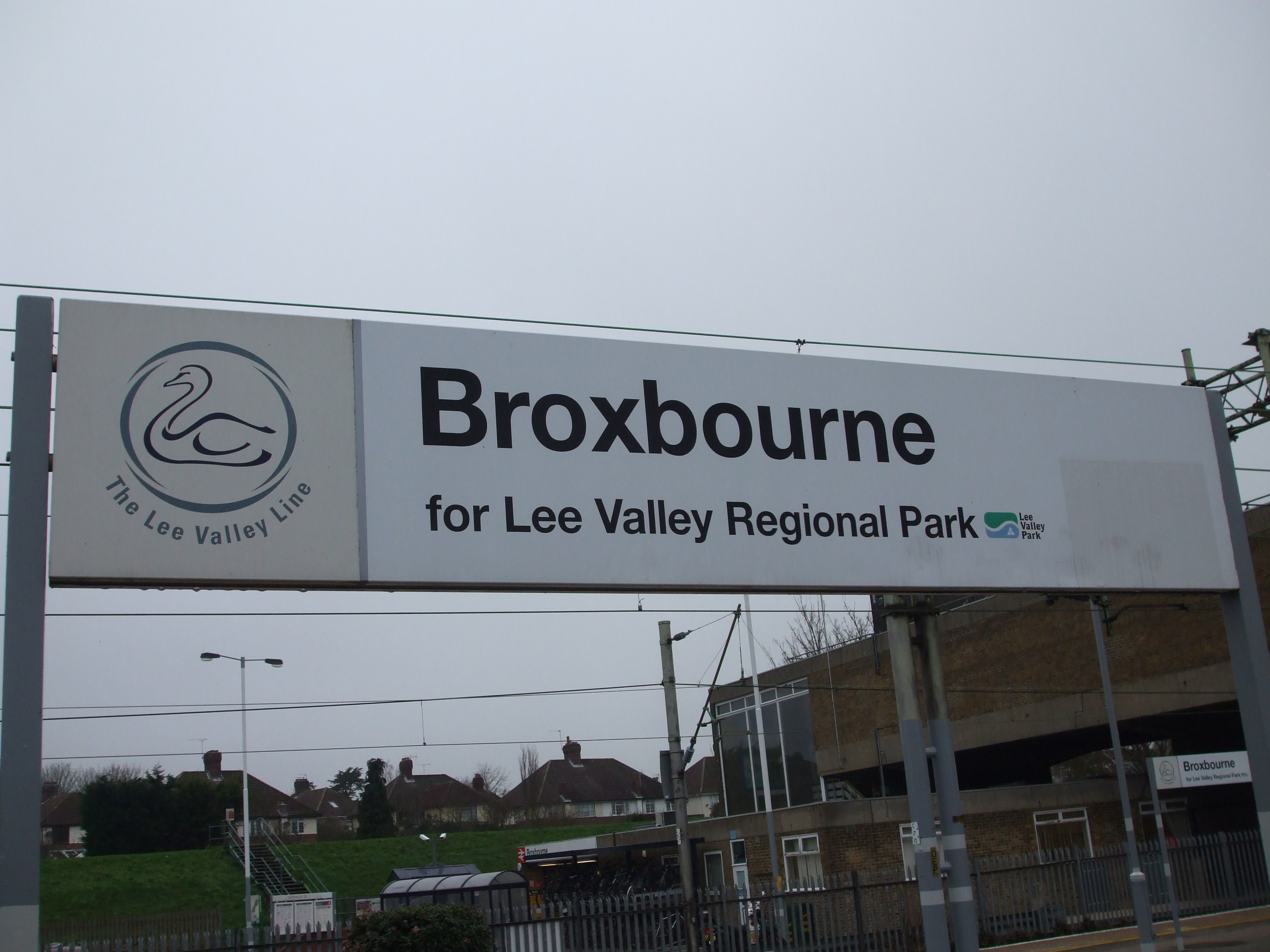
Broxbourne Station Sign intersecting Lea Valley

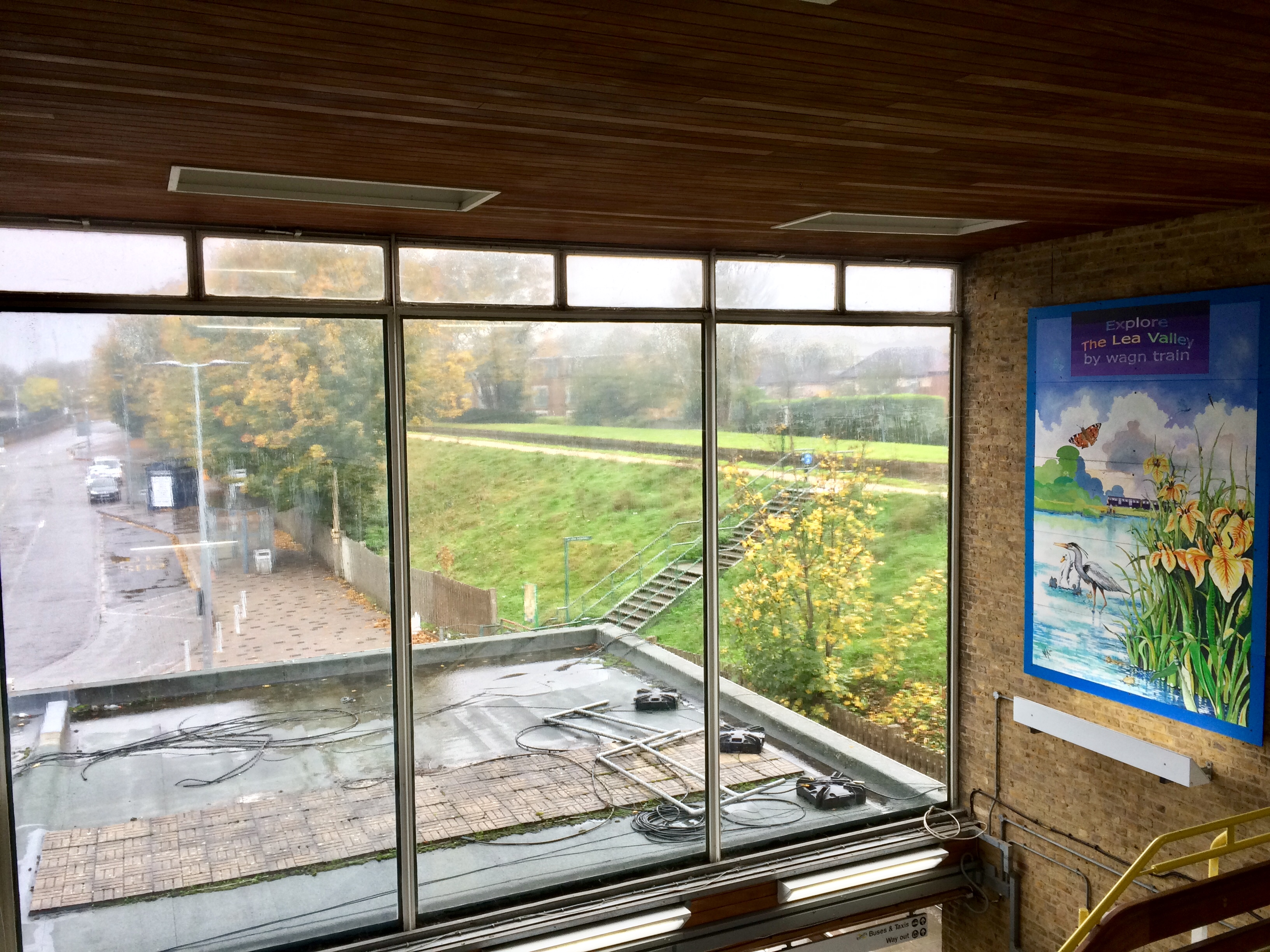
Inside Broxbourne Station

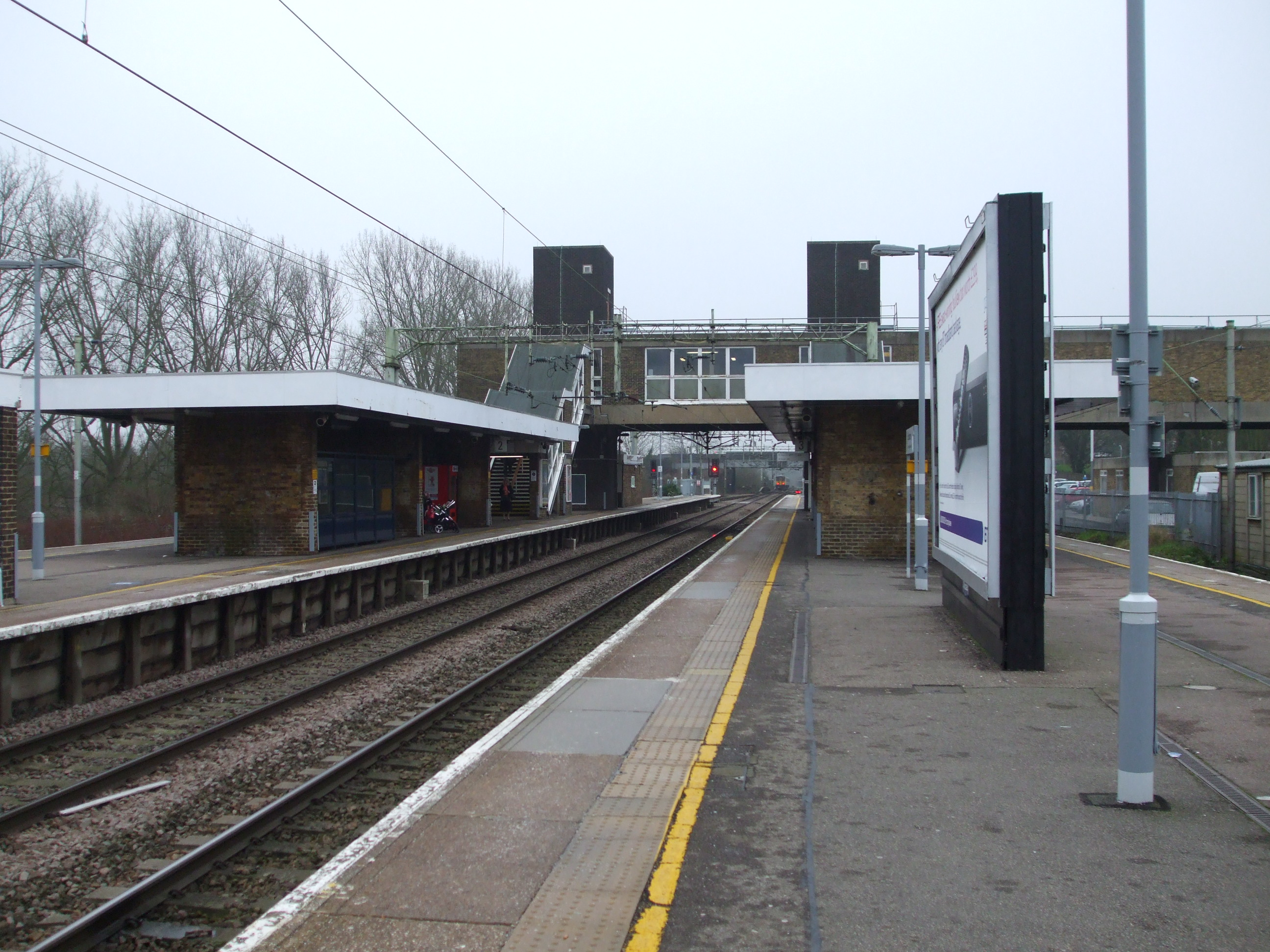
Broxbourne northbound platforms looking south

The station was Grade II listed in March 2009; "one of a very small number of post-war railway stations of clear architectural distinction".

Ticket barriers were installed in 2011. The station was later added to the Oyster system, outside of the numbered zones.

The centre platforms (platforms 2 and 3) were extended to accommodate 12-coach trains in December 2011, though initially no 12-coach trains were scheduled to call. In 2022, platforms 1 & 4 were also extended.

Of the four platforms, platforms 1 & 2 are used by southbound services to and from Liverpool Street and Stratford, while platform 3 & 4 are used for northbound services towards Hertford East, Bishops Stortford, Cambridge/Ely and Stansted Airport.

== Services ==
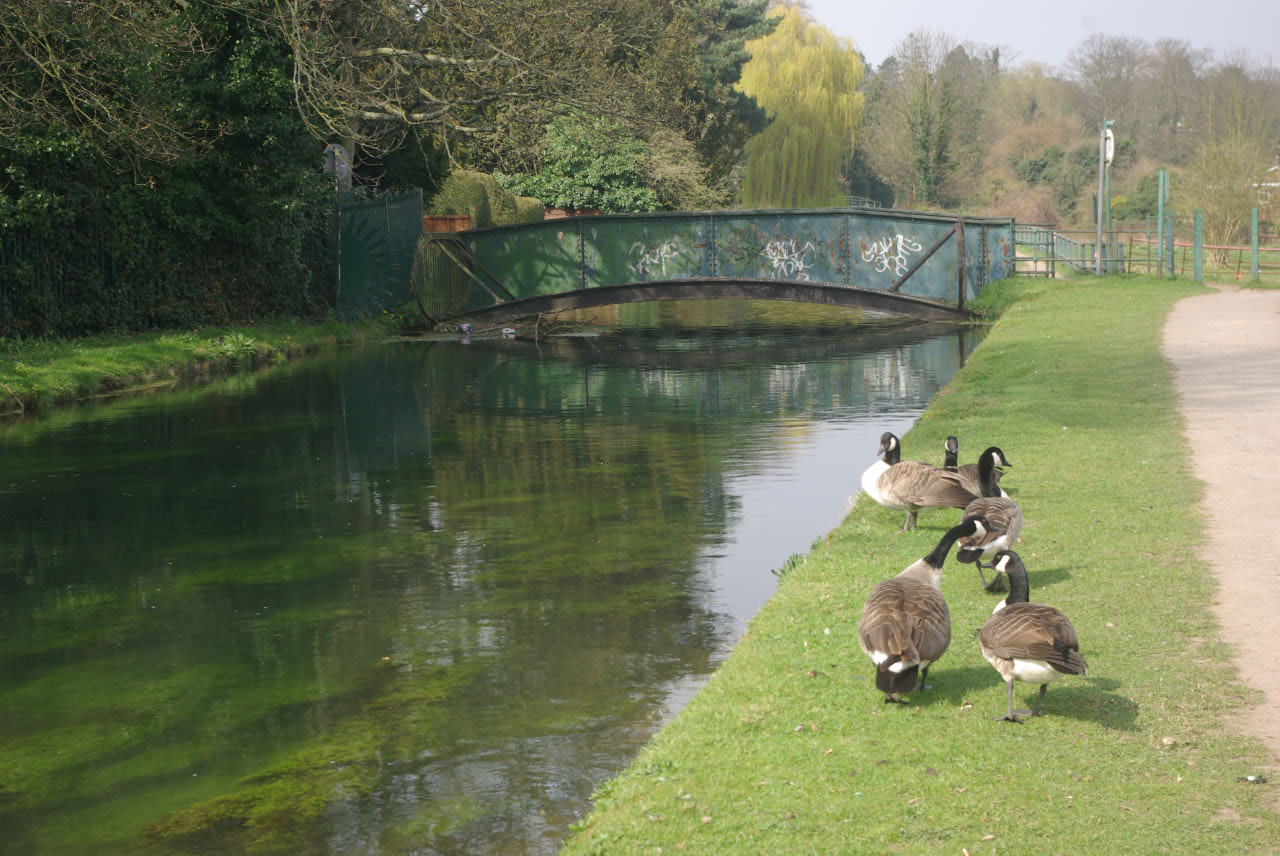
Broxbourne station footpath showing New River

The typical Monday-Saturday off-peak service is:

- 4 tph (trains per hour) to London Liverpool Street, of which:
  - 2 call at Cheshunt and Tottenham Hale, taking 28 minutes.
  - 2 call at Cheshunt, Waltham Cross, Enfield Lock, Brimsdown, Ponders End, Tottenham Hale and Hackney Downs, taking 36 minutes.
- 2 tph to Stratford, of which
  - 1 calls at Cheshunt, Waltham Cross, Enfield Lock, Northumberland Park, Tottenham Hale and Lea Bridge.
  - 1 calls at Cheshunt, Tottenham Hale and Lea Bridge.
- 2 tph to Hertford East, calling at Rye House, St Margarets and Ware, taking 17 minutes.
- 2 tph to Bishops Stortford, of which:
  - 1 calls at Roydon, Harlow Town, Harlow Mill and Sawbridgeworth
  - 1 calls at Roydon, Harlow Town and Sawbridgeworth
- 1 tph to Cambridge North calling at Harlow Town, Bishop's Stortford, Audley End and Whittlesford Parkway, taking 46 minutes.
- 1 tph to Cambridge North which calls at Roydon, Harlow Town, Harlow Mill, Sawbridgeworth, Bishop's Stortford, Stansted Mountfitchet, Elsenham, Newport, Audley End, Great Chesterford, Whittlesford Parkway, Shelford and Cambridge taking 60 minutes.

In the peak additional services to and from Liverpool Street/Ely serve the station.

On Sundays the general service pattern is:

- 2 tph to London Liverpool Street, of which:
  - 1 calls at Cheshunt and Tottenham Hale, taking 30 minutes.
  - 1 calls at Cheshunt, Tottenham Hale and Hackney Downs.
- 2 tph to Stratford, calling at Cheshunt, Waltham Cross, Enfield Lock, Brimsdown, Ponders End, Tottenham Hale and Lea Bridge.
- 2 tph to Hertford East as above, taking 18 minutes.
- 1 tph to Cambridge North, of calling at Harlow Town, Sawbridgeworth, Bishop's Stortford, Audley End Whittlesford Parkway and Shelford.
- 1 tph to Cambridge North which calls at all stations (as above).

Preceding station	National Rail	Following station
Cheshunt	Greater Anglia West Anglia Main Line	Roydon or Harlow Town
Cheshunt	Greater Anglia Hertford East Branch Line	Rye House
