= Hardmead Lock =

Canal lock in Hertfordshire, England

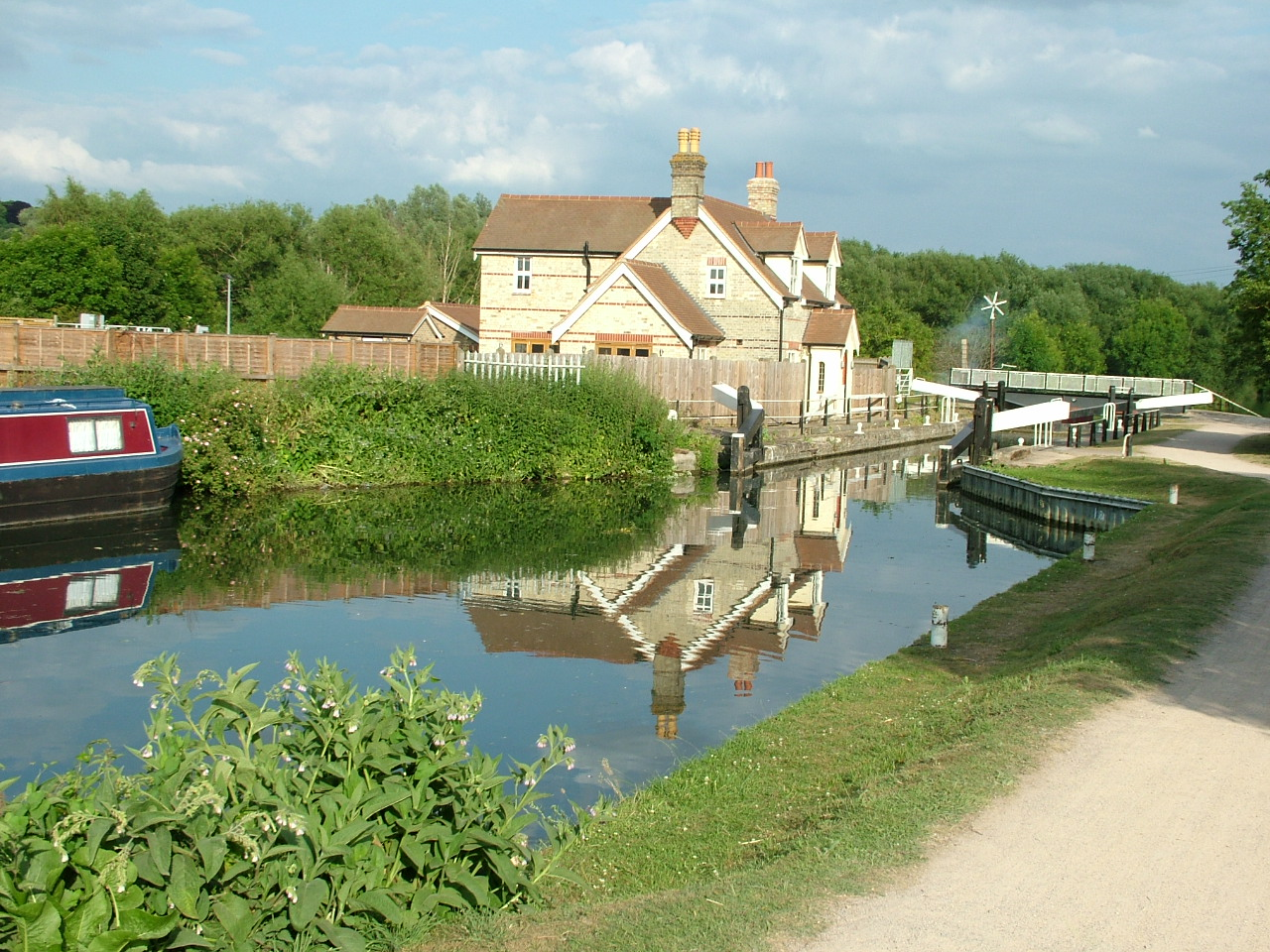
- Hardmead Lock
- Interactive map of Hardmead Lock
- 51.801911°N 0.014371°W
- Waterway: River Lee Navigation
- County: Hertfordshire
- Maintained by: Canal & River Trust
- Operation: Manual
- Length: 85 feet (25.9 m)
- Width: 16 feet (4.9 m)
- Fall: 5 feet 6 inches (1.7 m)
- Distance to Bow Creek: 22.5 miles (36.2 km)
- Distance to Hertford Castle Weir: 3.8 miles (6.1 km)

Hardmead Lock (No. 3) is a lock on the River Lee Navigation at Great Amwell close to the town of Ware.

The lock has a reputation as being difficult to negotiate.

== Location ==
The lock-keeper's cottage stands on an island formed by a section of the River Lee Flood Relief Channel which flows through an automatic sluice gate adjacent to the lock.

To the east of the lock is the Amwell Quarry nature reserve a Site of Special Scientific Interest (SSSI) and a section of the Old River Lea known as the Amwell Magna Fishery where it merges with its tributary the River Ash .

The New River flows close by to the west.

== Public access ==
The lock is located on the River Lee Navigation towpath which is part of the Lea Valley Walk

== Public transport ==
Ware railway station

Next lock upstream	River Lee Navigation	Next lock downstream
Ware Lock; 2.5 miles	Hardmead Lock; Grid reference: TL3689513388	Stanstead Lock; 1.0 mile
