= Robert Mylne =

Robert Mylne may refer to:

- Robert Mylne (mason) (1633–1710), Scottish master-mason
- Robert Mylne (architect) (1733–1811), Scottish architect and engineer, great-grandson of the mason
- Robert Mylne (writer) (1643–1747), Scottish writer, engraver and antiquary
- Robert William Mylne (1817–1890), English architect, civil engineer and geologist
- Robert Scott Mylne (1854–1920), antiquarian, son of Robert William Mylne

== See also ==
- Robert Milne (disambiguation)
