= Rye House railway station =

Network Rail station in Hertfordshire, England

Rye House
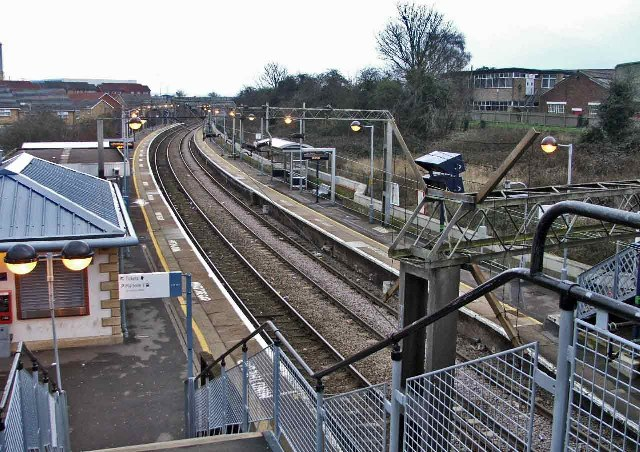
- Rye House station looking south
- Interactive map of Rye House

General information
- Location: Rye House, Hoddesdon
- Local authority: Borough of Broxbourne
- Grid reference: TL384097
- Managed by: Greater Anglia
- Station code: RYH
- DfT category: E
- Number of platforms: 2
- Accessible: Yes, platform 1 only
- Fare zone: B

National Rail annual entry and exit
- 2020–21: ▼0.136 million
- 2021–22: ▲0.284 million
- 2022–23: ▲0.337 million
- 2023–24: ▲0.415 million
- 2024–25: ▲0.436 million

Key dates
- 1843: Opened

Other information
- External links: Departures; Facilities
- Coordinates: 51.769°N 0.006°E

Rye House railway station is on the Hertford East branch line off the West Anglia Main Line in the east of England, serving the Rye House area of Hoddesdon, Hertfordshire. It is 18 miles 71 chains (30.4 km) down the line from London Liverpool Street and is situated between Broxbourne and St Margarets. Its three-letter station code is RYH.

The station and all trains calling are operated by Greater Anglia.

== Services ==
All services at Rye House are operated by Greater Anglia using Class 720 EMUs.

The typical off-peak service is two trains per hour in each direction between Hertford East and London Liverpool Street via Tottenham Hale. Additional services, including trains to and from Stratford call at the station during the peak hours.

On Sundays, southbound services at the station run to and from Stratford instead of London Liverpool Street.

| Preceding station | National Rail | Following station |
|---|---|---|
| Broxbourne | Greater Anglia Hertford East Branch Line | St Margarets |
