= Stanstead Lock =

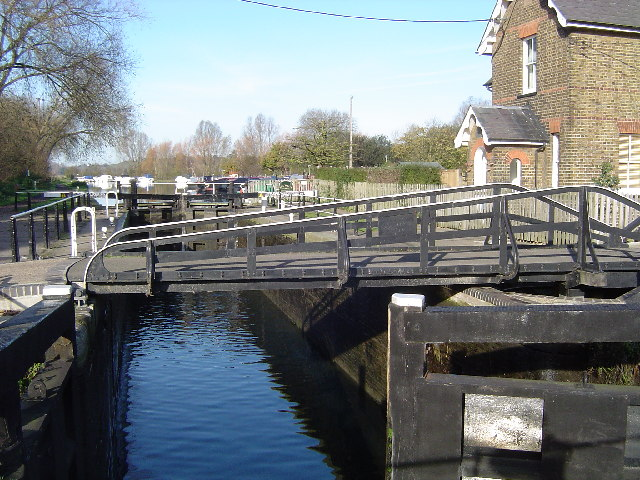
- The lock, lock-keeper's house and swing-bridge
- Interactive map of Stanstead Lock
- 51.790953°N 0.000131°E
- Waterway: River Lee Navigation
- County: Hertfordshire
- Maintained by: Canal & River Trust
- Operation: Manual
- Length: 85 feet (25.9 m)
- Width: 16 feet (4.9 m)
- Fall: 8 feet 4 inches (2.5 m)
- Distance to Bow Creek: 21.5 miles (34.6 km)
- Distance to Hertford Castle Weir: 4.8 miles (7.7 km)

Stanstead Lock (No4) is a lock on the River Lee Navigation close to the villages of Stanstead Abbotts and St Margarets. The lock which incorporates a rare example of a swing-bridge, has the reputation of being one of the country's most difficult to negotiate.

== Location ==
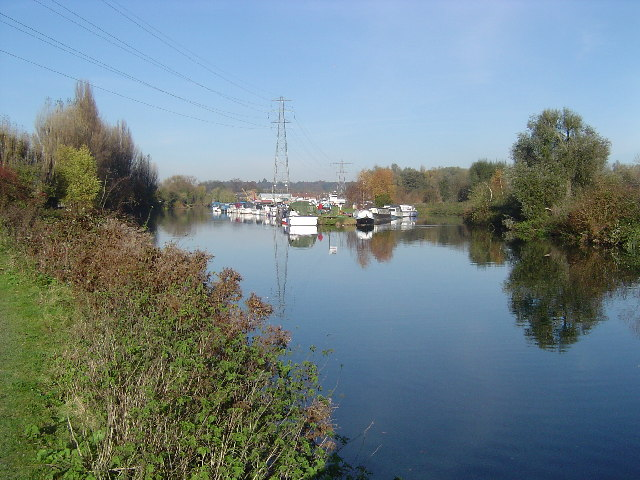
Stanstead marina viewed from the south. The Stanstead mill stream merges with the Navigation in the foreground

The lock-keeper's house is located on an island formed by a section of the River Lee Flood Relief Channel that flows through the automatic sluice gate adjacent to the lock.

Located to the south of the lock is the Stanstead marina.

== Public transport ==
St Margarets (Hertfordshire) railway station

Next lock upstream	River Lee Navigation	Next lock downstream
Hardmead Lock; 1.0 mile	Stanstead Lock; Grid reference: TL3792812197	Feildes Weir Lock; 2.5 miles
