= Spelbrook railway station =

Disused railway station in Spelbrook, Hertfordshire

Spelbrook

General information
- Location: Spellbrook, Hertfordshire; England
- Coordinates: 51.8366°N 0.1578°E
- Grid reference: TL487175

Other information
- Status: Disused

History
- Original company: Northern and Eastern Railway
- Pre-grouping: Northern and Eastern Railway

Key dates
- 22 November 1841: Opened
- 16 May 1842: Closed
Location

Spelbrook railway station, also known as Spellbrook railway station, Spelbroke railway station and Spillbrook railway station served the hamlet of Spellbrook, Hertfordshire, England, from 1841 to 1842 on the Northern and Eastern Railway.

== History ==
The station was opened on 22 November 1841 by the Northern and Eastern Railway. It was a temporary terminus that was only open for 6 months, closing on 16 May 1842 when Bishop's Stortford opened.

| Preceding station | Historical railways | Following station |
|---|---|---|
| Broxbourne; Line and station open | Northern and Eastern Railway | Terminus |
