= Stanstead St Margarets =

Village in Hertfordshire, England

Coordinates: 51.79°N 00.00°E

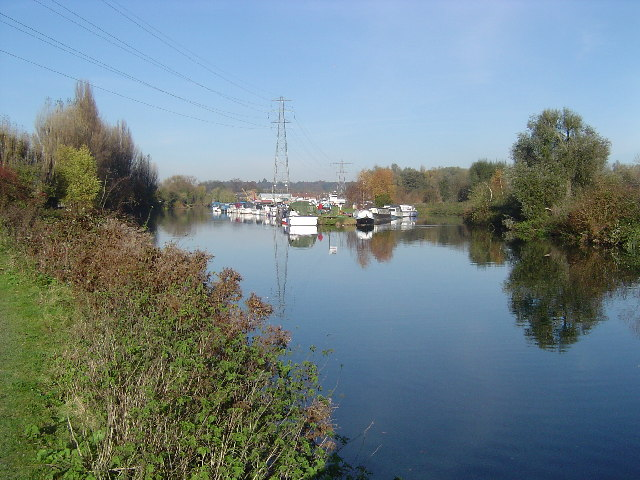
- Marina on the River Lea Navigation

- Location within Hertfordshire
- Population: 1,576 (Parish, 2021)
- OS grid reference: TL3711
- District: East Hertfordshire
- Shire county: Hertfordshire
- Region: East
- Country: England
- Sovereign state: United Kingdom
- Post town: WARE
- Postcode district: SG12
- Dialling code: 01920
- Police: Hertfordshire
- Fire: Hertfordshire
- Ambulance: East of England
- UK Parliament: Broxbourne

Stanstead St Margarets, often abbreviated to just St Margarets, is a village and civil parish in the East Hertfordshire district of Hertfordshire, England. It is located halfway between the towns of Hoddesdon and Ware. It lies on the west bank of the River Lea, which separates it from Stanstead Abbotts on the east bank. Stanstead St Margarets is now classed as part of the Stanstead Abbotts built up area by the Office for National Statistics, and has Stanstead Abbotts postal addresses. It is served by St Margarets railway station. At the 2021 census, the parish had a population of 1,576.

== History ==
The area which became the parish of Stanstead St Margarets appears to have anciently formed part of the parish of Great Amwell. Stanstead St Margarets is not mentioned in the Domesday Book of 1086. From the 12th century onwards, references to a place called Thele start appearing, which also became known as Pons de Thele (Bridge of Thele) from its bridge over the River Lea. By the mid-13th century Thele had become a separate parish from Great Amwell.

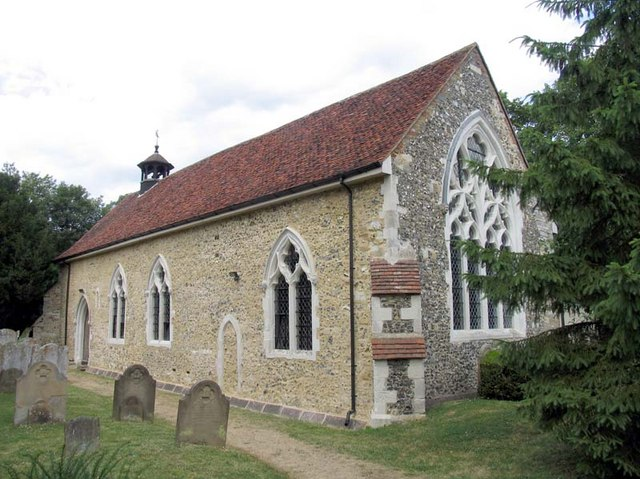
St Margaret's Church

The parish church is dedicated to St Margaret. It was largely rebuilt around 1316, although retains some Norman features from an earlier building.

The name of the parish fluctuated over time. In the 12th century, the Thele area formed part of the same manor as Stanstead Abbotts on the east bank of the river. The parish on the west bank of the river was known at different times by several names, including Thele, Pons de Thele, and Stanstead Thele, before the name settled on Stanstead St Margarets, combining the names of the manor to which it belonged and the name of its parish church.

== Geography ==
The Greenwich Meridian (longitude 0°) passes through the village with its exact position marked by Meridian obelisks which were erected in 1984 to commemorate the centenary of the adoption of the prime meridian line.

The settlement of Stanstead St Margarets lies between the River Lea and the New River, along the Hoddesdon Road. It is classed as part of the Stanstead Abbotts built up area by the Office for National Statistics. That built up area also includes the parts of Great Amwell parish around St Margarets railway station. The name Stanstead St Margarets is not used in postal addresses; the main part of the settlement around the parish church has Stanstead Abbotts postal addresses, as does the adjoining area around St Margarets railway station in Great Amwell parish.

The parish of Stanstead St Margarets also includes some rural areas to the west of the settlement and some peripheral parts of the built up area of Hoddesdon.

== Transport ==
The village is served by St Margarets station on the Hertford East Line, operated by Greater Anglia. The station lies just outside the parish of Stanstead St Margarets, being in the neighbouring parish of Great Amwell. St Margarets station was formerly the junction with the now closed Buntingford Branch Line.

The 25 bus route from Harlow to Cheshunt runs through the village. There are also bus connections to Hertford and Bishop's Stortford.

== Sport and leisure ==
The St. Margaretsbury recreation ground hosts the football club St. Margaretsbury F.C., with youth and adult teams, as well as a cricket club.

The village has a Scout Group, the 1st Stanstead Abbotts & St. Margaret's Scout Group.

== See also ==
- Stanstead Abbotts
- Stanstead Lock, River Lea
