= Rye House, Hertfordshire =

Grade I listed house in Hertfordshire, England

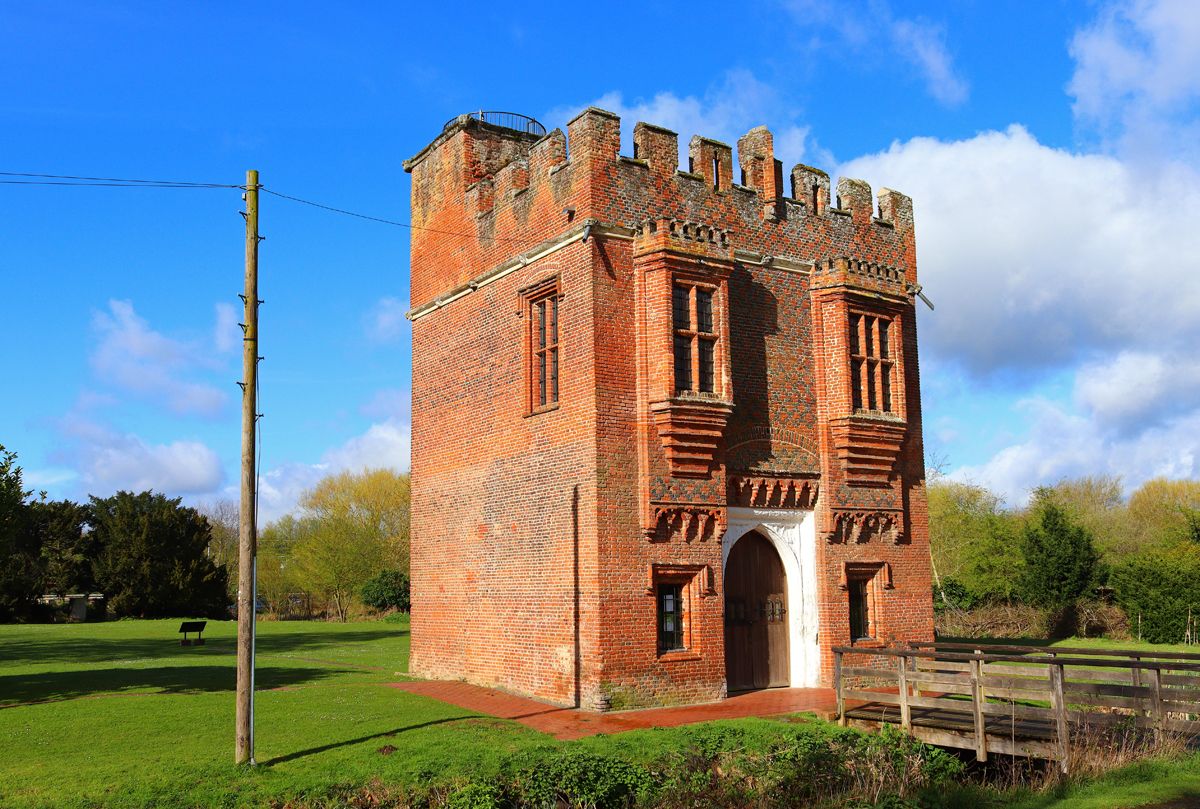
- The gatehouse of Rye House, the only surviving part of the manor house

- Location within Hertfordshire

General information
- Location: Lee Valley Park, Hoddesdon
- Coordinates: 51.7711°N 0.007°E
- Construction started: c.1443

Rye House in Hoddesdon, Hertfordshire is a former fortified manor house, located in what is now the Lee Valley Regional Park. The 15th-century gatehouse is the surviving part of the structure and is a Grade I listed building. The site is a scheduled monument.

The house gave its name to the Rye House Plot of 1683, an alleged plan to assassinate Charles II of England and his brother James.

== History ==
The ownership of Rye House was very stable over four centuries; but the fabric gradually ran down, and the buildings diminished.

=== Foundation ===
Andres Pedersen, a Danish soldier who took part in the Hundred Years' War, was denizenised in England in 1433, becoming Sir Andrew Ogard. In 1443 he was allowed to impark part of the manor of Rye, the area then called the Isle of Rye, in the parish of Stanstead Abbots, and was given licence to crenellate what became Rye House. Over 50 types of moulded brick were used in its construction.

=== Early Modern period ===
In 1517 William Parr was living at Rye House; it was the main family home for the Parrs, Catherine Parr and Anne Parr also, after their father's death, until 1531. It passed in 1577 to Joyce Frankland from her husband William. The Frankland family sold it to the Baeshe family, in 1619.

It was later the setting of the Rye House Plot. In 1683, when the putative plot was actively being discussed, it was occupied by Richard Rumbold, one of the conspirators. It was bought by the Fieldes family in 1676, in the person of the Hertford MP Edmund Feilde (or Field). A short film was made about the Rye House Plot in the late 1920s.

=== From the 19th century ===
By 1834 Rye House had become a workhouse. Subsequently (William) Henry Teale developed it into a tourist attraction, buying the house and 50 acres in 1864. There were a maze and a bowling green, among other features. An affray there in 1885 between Catholic excursionists and Orangemen led to a question in the House of Commons. In 1870, Teale acquired the Great Bed of Ware and put it to use in his pleasure garden. In 1911 it was described as a hotel. After interest in the garden waned in the 1920s, the bed was bought by the Victoria and Albert Museum in 1931. The moat was put to uses including growing water cress. The part that had been filled in was excavated in the 1980s.

== Geography ==
The local geography played a significant part in the history of the house. At Hoddesdon the River Stort runs into the River Lea, and the area was often flooded. The lord of the manor of Rye maintained a bridge over the Lea, and a causeway. The causeway became part of the coaching road via Bishop's Stortford into East Anglia.

== Gallery ==
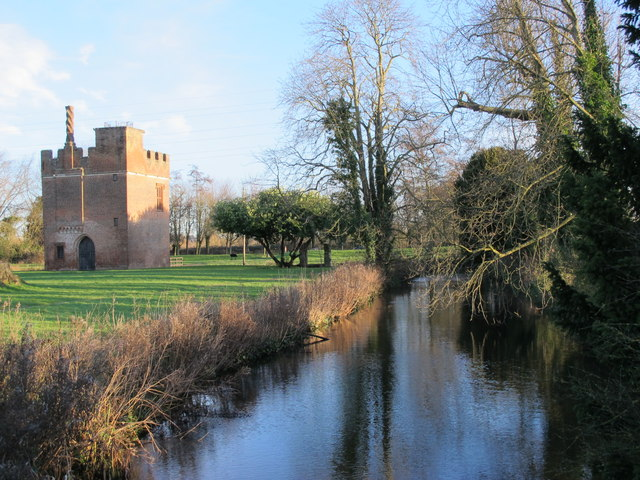
The moat and gatehouse

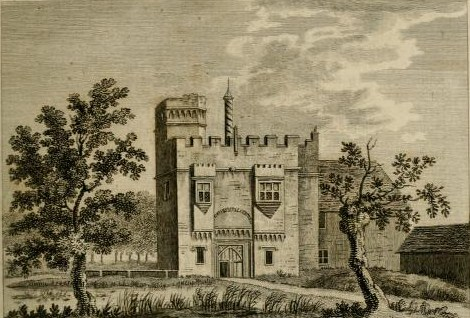
Engraving from 1777, showing the gatehouse brickwork before restoration. By 1795 some of this brickwork had gone.

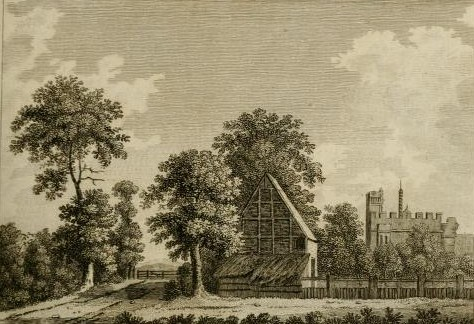
View from the road (1777 engraving), facing south-west

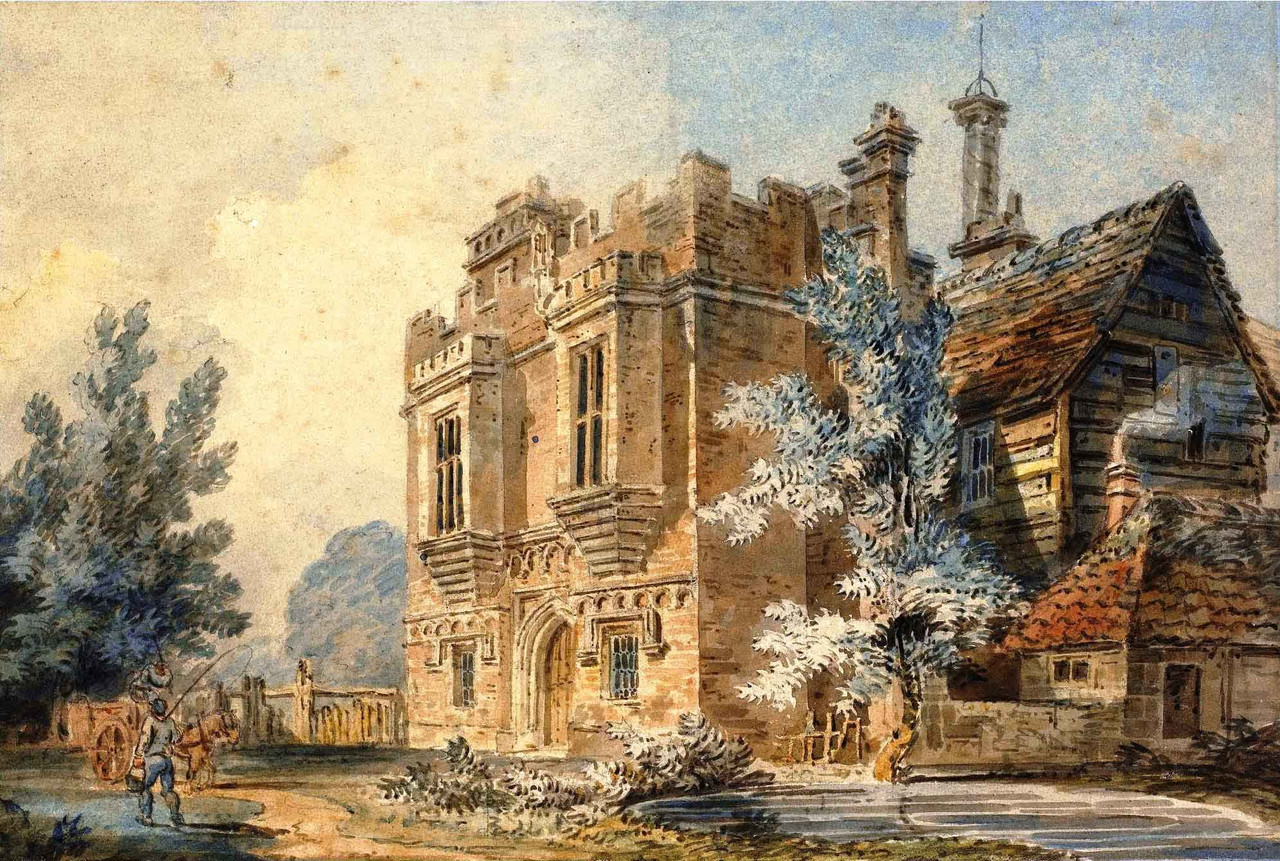
1793 illustration of Rye House by J. M. W. Turner

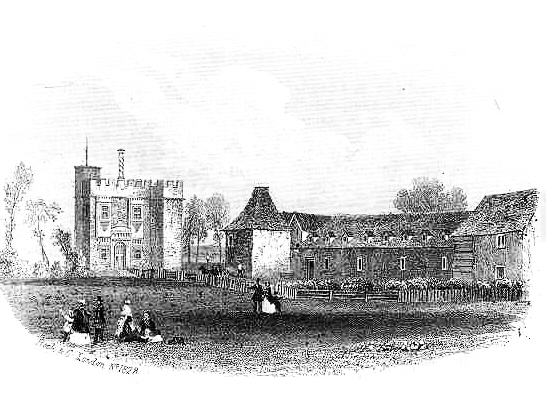
Rye House, 1823 engraving. The long building was a barn and malting-house, then used as a workhouse

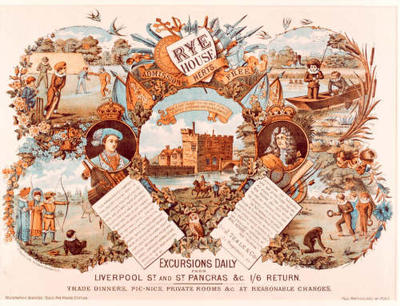
Poster from around 1880, advertising excursions to Rye House from London terminuses

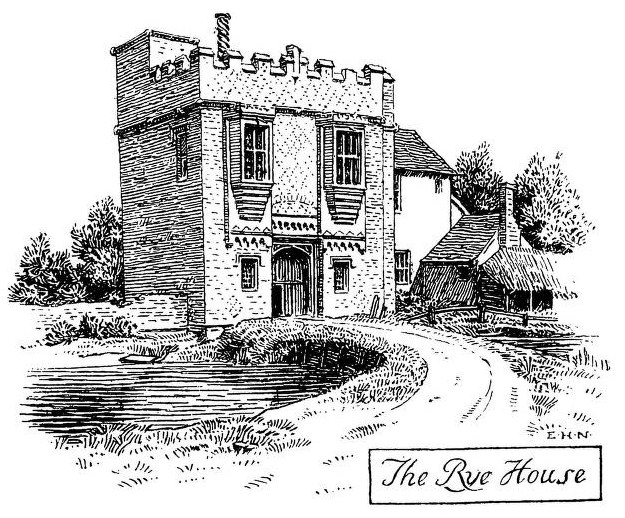
Engraving by Edmund Hort New from an 1897 edition of The Compleat Angler

== See also ==
- Rye House railway station
