= Robert Milne =

Robert Milne may refer to:

- Robert Menli Lyon (1789–c. 1863), Scottish-born humanitarian, born Robert Milne
- Bob Milne (footballer) (1870–1932), Scottish-born footballer who played for Ireland
- Robert Milne (cricketer, born 1960), English cricketer
- Robert Milne (cricketer, born 1852) (1852–1927), English cricketer
- Robert Milne (Canadian politician) (1881–1953), member of parliament
- Robert Duncan Milne (1844–1899), American science fiction writer
- Robert Milne, telecommunications consultant, see Inmos
- Robert Milne, Master of Dulwich College

== See also ==
- Bob Milne, American musician
- Robert Mylne (disambiguation)
