= Hertford East branch line =

Railway line in Hertfordshire, England

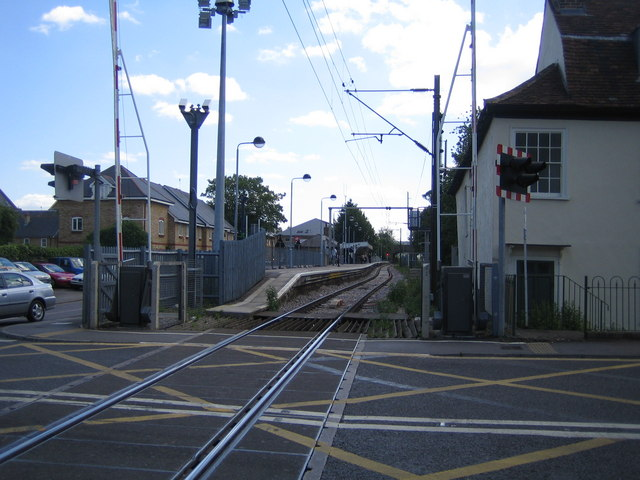
- The single track line through Ware railway station

Overview
- Status: Operational
- Owner: Network Rail
- Locale: East of England
- Termini: Broxbourne; Hertford East
- Stations: 4

Service
- Type: Heavy rail, Commuter rail
- System: National Rail
- Operator(s): Greater Anglia
- Depot(s): Ilford
- Rolling stock: Class 720

History
- Opened: 1843

Technical
- Line length: 5 miles 64 chains (9.3 km)
- Track gauge: 1,435 mm (4 ft 8 1/2 in) standard gauge
- Electrification: 25 kV 50 Hz AC OHLE
Route map
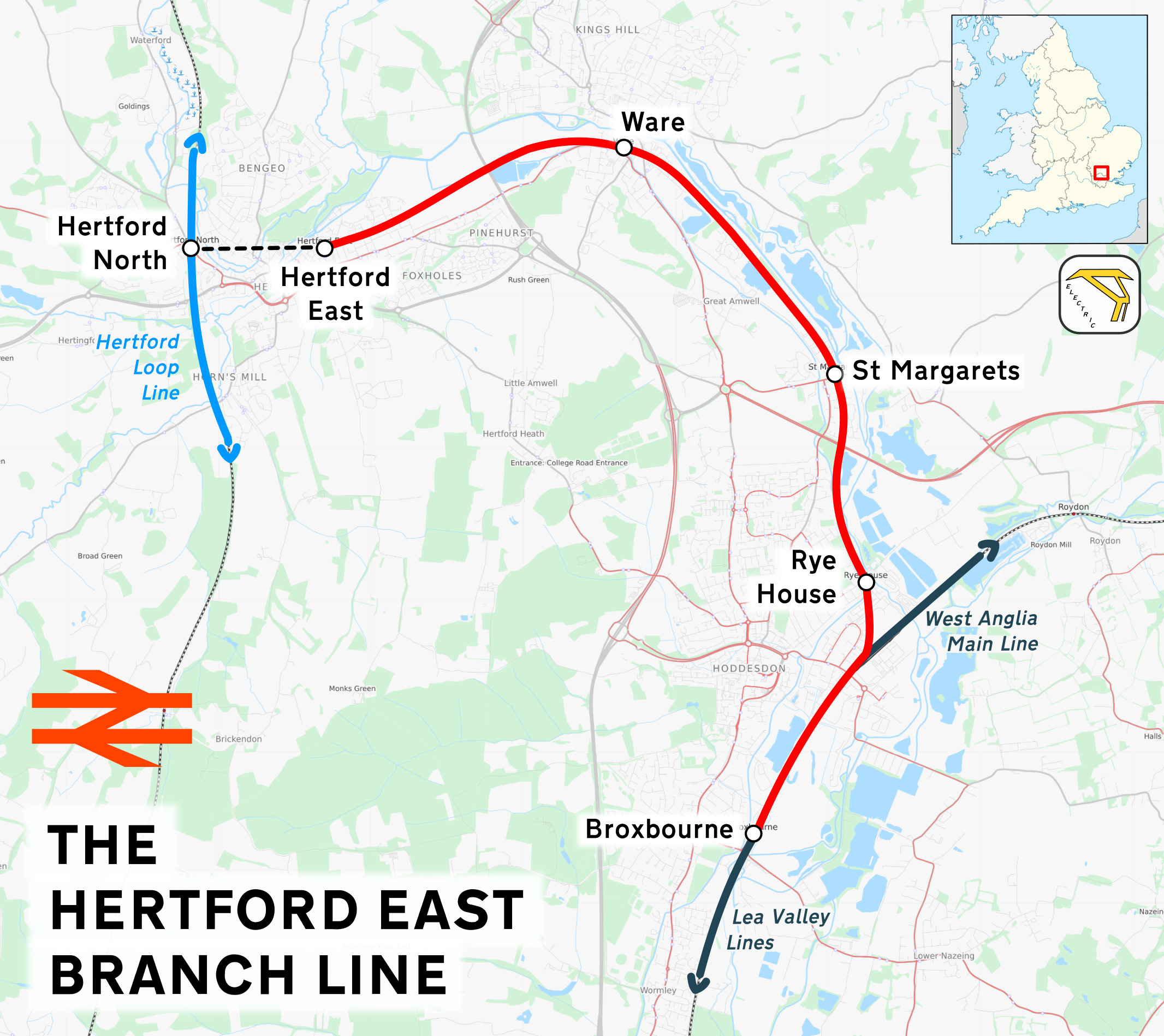
(Click to expand)

The Hertford East branch line is a railway line in Hertfordshire, England running between Hertford East and Broxbourne. The line follows the route of the Lea Valley, serving intermediate towns and villages. It branches off the West Anglia Main Line north of Broxbourne, and could be seen as part of the Lea Valley lines—a collection of commuter routes into London. It is 5 miles 64 chains (9.33 km) in length.

== History ==
In June 1841, the Northern and Eastern Railway (N&ER) was given authorisation in the Northern and Eastern Railway (Broxbourne, &c. Branch Line) Act 1841 (4 & 5 Vict. c. xlii) to construct a branch from Broxbourne to Hertford. Work on the line began early in 1843 and the branch (and all stations on it) was opened as a single track on 31 October of that year. Operation by the N&ER was short-lived as it had already agreed that the Eastern Counties Railway would lease its lines (then from Stratford to Bishop's Stortford as well as the Hertford East branch). The line was doubled in October 1846.

The original Hertford station was opened in 1843. It was sited to avoid two nearby schools, but later it was closed and in 1888 Hertford East station was opened further west and closer to the town centre. Another station existed in 1858 on the line from Hatfield, but this closed as soon as Hertford North station opened in 1924.

Part of the Hertford East branch was used for the Buntingford Branch Railway, or "The Bunt", a railway which ran from Buntingford to London from 1863 to 1964. The Buntingford Railway split off this line just to the north of St Margarets station.

== Route and services ==
The line curves away from Broxbourne to the left and heads towards Hertford. For most of its length, it is bounded by the New River on its south side and the River Lea and Lee Navigation on the north side.

Towns and villages served are:

- Broxbourne
- Rye House on the outskirts of Hoddesdon
- St Margarets and neighbouring Stanstead Abbotts
- Ware
- Hertford East.

The line is part of the Network Rail Strategic Route 5, SRS 05.03 and is classified as a London and South East Commuter line.

There are currently two trains an hour on this line serving all stations. Future plans for this line see the lengthening of platforms to facilitate longer trains and create extra capacity on the line. Services on this line are currently operated by Greater Anglia using Class 720 units consisting of 5 or 10 car formations.

Usually, trains on the Hertford East branch line go to Liverpool Street (on Mondays to Saturdays, via Tottenham Hale and Hackney Downs), and Stratford (on Sundays). On days of engineering works, train services often terminate at Broxbourne.

== Infrastructure ==
The line is double track throughout except for a small section through Ware where it is single track. It is electrified at 25 kV AC using overhead line equipment, and has a loading gauge of W6.
