= St Margarets railway station (Hertfordshire) =

Network Rail station in Hertfordshire, England

St Margarets
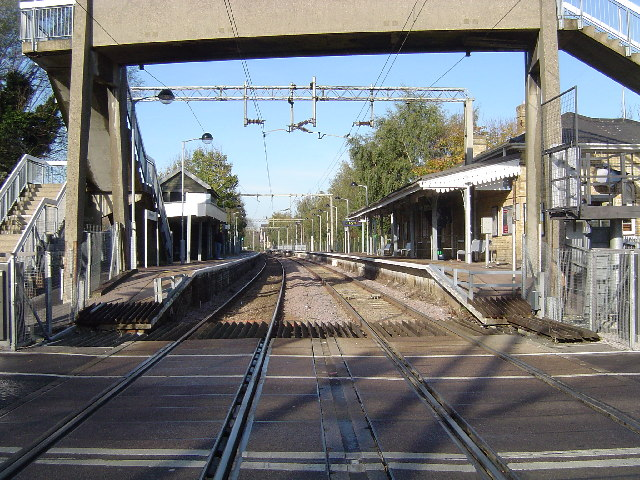
- Interactive map of St Margarets

General information
- Location: Stanstead St Margarets
- Local authority: East Hertfordshire
- Grid reference: TL381118
- Managed by: Greater Anglia
- Station code: SMT
- DfT category: E
- Number of platforms: 2
- Accessible: Yes
- Fare zone: B

National Rail annual entry and exit
- 2020–21: ▼89,100
- 2021–22: ▲0.232 million
- 2022–23: ▲0.268 million
- 2023–24: ▲0.325 million
- 2024–25: ▲0.351 million

Key dates
- 1843: Opened

Other information
- External links: Departures; Facilities
- Coordinates: 51.788°N 0.001°E

St Margarets railway station is on the Hertford East branch line off the West Anglia Main Line in the east of England, serving the villages of Stanstead St Margarets and Stanstead Abbotts, Hertfordshire. It is 20 miles 25 chains (32.7 km) down the line from London Liverpool Street and is situated between Rye House and Ware. Its three-letter station code is SMT. It is in the civil parish of Great Amwell.

The station and all trains calling are operated by Greater Anglia.

== History ==
St Margarets was previously the junction with the now closed Buntingford Branch Line to Buntingford.

The station won the Small Station of the Year award at the National Rail Awards in 2026.

== Facilities ==
There is a ticket office that is open at peak times as well as a self-service ticket machine, and a waiting room and toilets. The Oyster card system was extended through to Hertford East and became operational at St Margaret's in 2015.

== Services ==
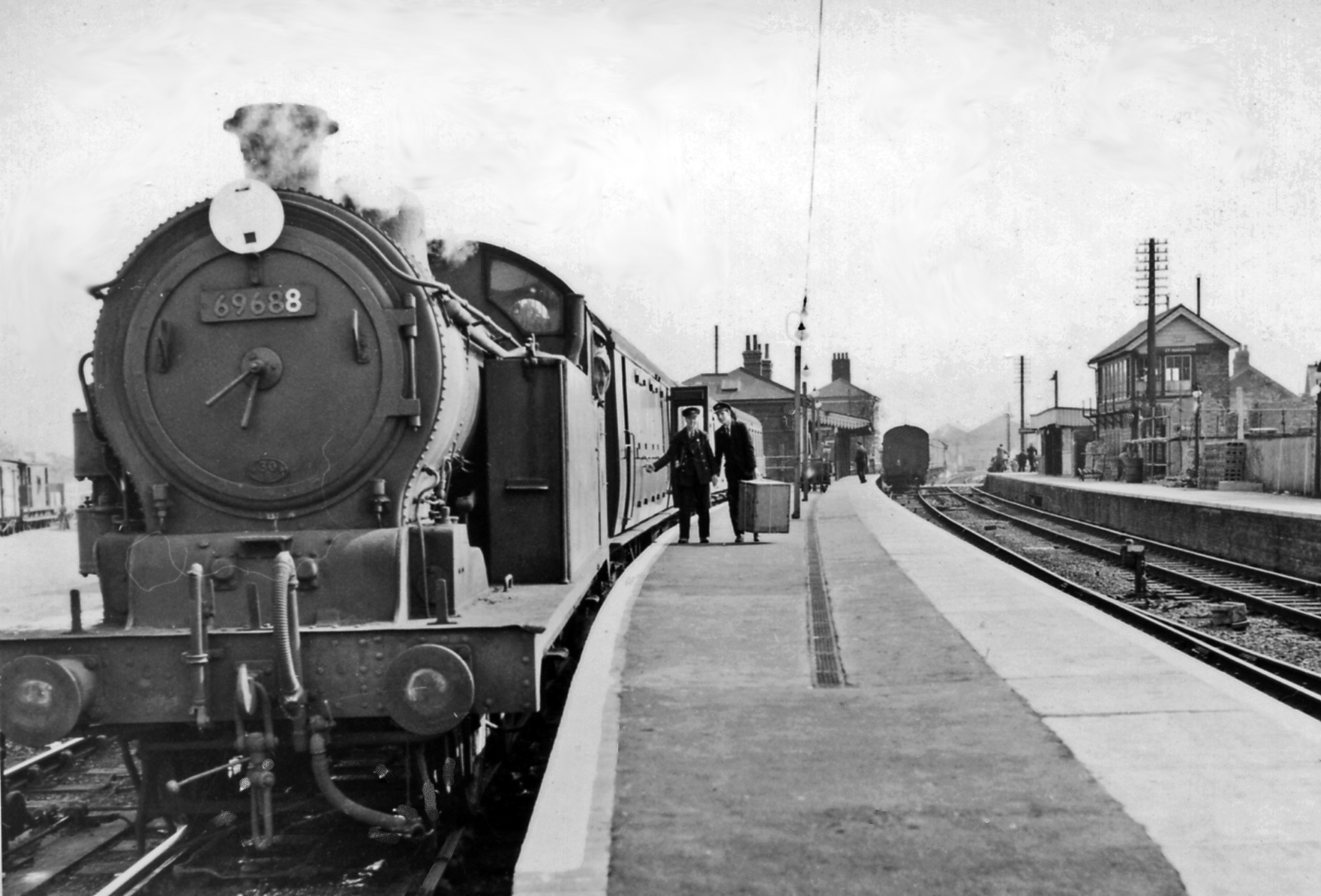
Buntingford branch train in 1959

All services at St Margarets are operated by Greater Anglia using Class 720 EMUs.

The typical off-peak service is two trains per hour in each direction between Hertford East and London Liverpool Street via Tottenham Hale. Additional services, including trains to and from Stratford call at the station during the peak hours.

On Sundays, southbound services at the station run to and from Stratford instead of London Liverpool Street.

Preceding station	National Rail	Following station
Rye House	Greater Anglia Hertford East Branch Line	Ware
	Disused railways	
Rye House Line and station open	British Rail Eastern Region Buntingford Branch Line	Mardock Line and station closed

== Community rail ==
A community rail group provide flowers on the platform, local literature and history, and local information boards.
