= Robert William Mylne =

Robert William Mylne, FRS FRSE FGS FRIBA (14 June 1817 – 2 July 1890) was an English architect, civil engineer and geologist.

== Life ==
Mylne was born in Great Amwell, Hertfordshire, the son of William Chadwell Mylne (1781–1863) and grandson of Robert Mylne (1733–1811), both of whom were chief engineers of the New River Company. His mother was Mary Smith Coxhead (1791–1884).

Robert William himself also practiced as an architect and engineer. In 1836 he worked on designing new docks at Sunderland, and he traveled to Italy and Sicily in the early 1840s. He acted as his father's assistant for twenty years, becoming an authority on water supply. He was later appointed Engineer to the Limerick Water Company, and provided a fresh-water supply for one of the Spithead forts.

He wrote a number of books, primarily on the subject of the geology of London, as well as producing several geological maps of the area. His 1856 "Map of the Geology and Contours of London and its Environs", produced at a scale of 4 miles to 1 inch, was the first comprehensive geological map of London. In 1859 he was one of a party of eminent scientists, including Joseph Prestwich, Sir John Evans, Hugh Falconer, Godwin-Austen and John W. Flower, who investigated the discovery of ancient human remains in the Somme valley, establishing the antiquity of man.

He was an associate of the Institute of British Architects from 1839, and a member of the Geological Society from 1848 and of the Smeatonian Society of Civil Engineers. In 1860, he was elected a Fellow of the Royal Society. His candidature citation read:

The author of a work 'On the London Strata,' and three Geological and Topographical and Statistical Maps of London and its Environs, 1856; of a paper 'On the ancient Basilicae of Rome,' 'On the Supply from Artesian Wells in the London Basin,' 1840. Attached to science, and anxious to promote its progress.

In 1884, he was elected a Fellow of the Royal Society of Edinburgh. His proposers were George Seton, Lord Kelvin, William Rutherford and Peter Guthrie Tait.

He died at Home Lodge in Great Amwell in 1890. He is buried in the Mylne family vault at St John the Baptist Church in Amwell, designed by his ancestor Robert Mylne.

== Family ==
In 1852 he married Hannah Scott (1826–1885), the daughter of George Scott.

Their eldest son was Robert Scott Mylne FRSE.

== Publications ==
- "On the supply of Water from Artesian Wells in the London Basin", 1840
- "Account of the Ancient Basilica of San Clemente in Rome", 1845
- "Sections of the London Strata", 1850
- "Topographical Map of London and its Environs", 1851 and 1855
- "Map of the Geology and Contours of London and its Environs", 1856
- "Map of London, Geological - Waterworks and Sewers", 1858
