= Stanstead Abbotts =

Village in Hertfordshire, England

Coordinates: 51.788613°N 0.012308°E

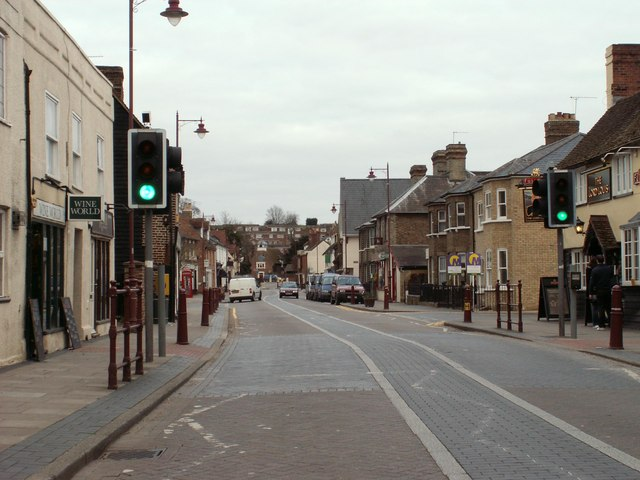
- The High Street in Stanstead Abbotts

- Location within Hertfordshire
- Population: 2,046 (Parish, 2021); 3,728 (Built up area, 2021)
- OS grid reference: TL4011
- Civil parish: Stanstead Abbots
- District: East Hertfordshire
- Shire county: Hertfordshire
- Region: East
- Country: England
- Sovereign state: United Kingdom
- Post town: WARE
- Postcode district: SG12
- Dialling code: 01920
- Police: Hertfordshire
- Fire: Hertfordshire
- Ambulance: East of England
- UK Parliament: Broxbourne

Stanstead Abbotts (alternatively Stanstead Abbots) is a village and civil parish in the East Hertfordshire district of Hertfordshire, England. It lies 2 miles (3 km) south-east of Ware, its post town. The centre of the village adjoins the east bank of the River Lea, which forms the parish boundary with the neighbouring parishes of Stanstead St Margarets and Great Amwell west of the river.

The Stanstead Abbotts built up area as defined by the Office for National Statistics extends beyond the parish boundary to include Stanstead St Margarets and the parts of Great Amwell parish around St Margarets railway station; although outside the parish, these areas also have Stanstead Abbotts postal addresses. To the east of the village, Stanstead Abbotts parish includes surrounding rural areas, and the southern boundary of the parish forms the county boundary with Essex. At the 2021 census, the parish had a population of 2,046 and the Stanstead Abbotts built up area had a population of 3,728.

== History ==
=== Name and origins ===
The earliest mention of Stanstead Abbotts found so far goes back to 693 - 709. In a charter of AD693 from Swaefred, King of Essex, giving some land in Nazing. Rob Bennett, one of Stanstead Abbotts history researchers, found the following charter for the endowment of a nunnery/monastic house, at Nazing, south of the village at the following website: Anglo-Saxons.net : S 65a He ran the text through a couple of translators and then re-wrote it for sense; the early part reads like A-S poetry! Here is his translation:

I the king have understood. I understood and urgently considered the nearness of my end. Nothing is steady in the affairs of man, nothing permanent. Only a good standing without blemish in the eyes of God. For this reason, for the remedy of my soul, I have to give you a fymme (farm?) of my land that is in Nazing, of which the land is part of an [enodmerese?], with all of my belongings. The fields of the woods and fisheries...Sadly the text at this point is damaged and fragmentary. However the last few words read in Latin: cuius terre terminibus est Stanhemstede in australi parte . This is difficult to translate though seems to say 'this landmark (or site) is in the southern part of Stanhemstede.

king (of Essex), to Fymme; grant of 30 hides (manentes) in Nazeingbury, Essex. Latin.

We know the exact site of the nunnery from Archeological excavations and it's about 3.5 miles away from the centre of Stanstead Abbotts. What we have here is possibly the first reference to our area in a charter.

The village's name was recorded as "Stanstede" in the Domesday Book of 1086. In the twelfth century the manor passed to the abbot of Waltham Holy Cross. By the fourteenth century the suffix "Abbatis", "Abbotts" or "Abbot" formed part of the parish's name. The abbey continued possession of the manor until its dissolution in 1531.

The manor of Stanstead Abbotts was granted to Anne Boleyn and remained with the crown after her execution. In 1559 Queen Elizabeth granted it to Edward Baeshe and it remained in the Bashe family for several generations.

== The village ==
Once situated on the main A414, Stanstead Abbotts has many old buildings in its High Street, although many have now made way for newer residential properties. The village is on the Hertford East branch line, with trains from St Margarets station to Liverpool Street station. The main industry in the village used to be making ale but many of the original maltings have now been demolished to make way for a small business park.

The main entrance to the All Nations Christian College in Stanstead Abbotts was used as the entrance to the school in the "St Trinians" films.

The local school is St Andrews Primary CE (VC) Primary School.

The Lee Valley Marina, part of the Lee Valley Park, is located to the south of the village on the River Lea.

The village was awarded the title "Best kept village in Hertfordshire – large village" in 1999.

Several bus routes run through or near the village, including buses to Harlow, Hunsdon, Hertford, Cheshunt, and Waltham Cross.

The Stanstead Abbotts built up area as defined by the Office for National Statistics extends beyond the parish boundary to include Stanstead St Margarets and the parts of Great Amwell parish around St Margarets railway station. These areas west of the River Lea within the built up area also have Stanstead Abbotts postal addresses.

== Sport and leisure ==
The village has a Scout Group, the 1st Stanstead Abbotts & St. Margaret's Scout Group.

Stanstead Abbotts has a Non-League football club St. Margaretsbury F.C., which plays at The Recreation Ground.

== See also ==
- St James' Church, Stanstead Abbotts
- Stanstead Lock, River Lea
- The Hundred Parishes
- Stanstead St Margarets
