= Robert Scott Mylne =

Rev Robert Scott Mylne FRSE FSSA FSA BCL (2 April 1854 – 23 November 1920) was an English vicar, antiquarian and historical author.

== Life ==
He was born on 2 April 1854 the son of Robert William Mylne (died 1890) and his wife, Hannah Scott.

He was rector of Furtho in Northamptonshire then of Great Amwell.

In 1902 he was elected a Fellow of the Royal Society of Edinburgh. His proposers were Sir Arthur Mitchell, Sir Archibald Geikie, George Chrystal and Alexander Crum Brown.

He died on 23 November 1920 at Great Amwell in Hertfordshire. He is buried in the churchyard of St John the Baptist in a vault designed for his family by his ancestor, Robert Mylne.

== Publications ==
- The Master Masons to the Crown of Scotland and Their Work (1893) – chosen as one of the "books of the week" by The Times shortly after its publication
- The Cathedral Church of Bayeux (1904)
- The True Ground of Faith
- The Canon Law
- The Deep Waters of Blue Galilee (poem)
