= Great Amwell =

Village in Hertfordshire, England

Coordinates: 51.794°N 0.014°W

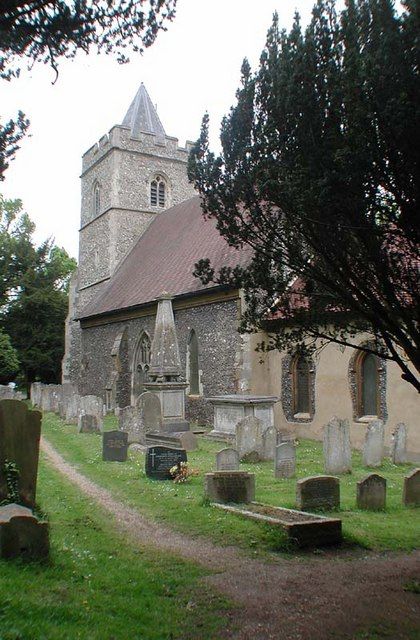
- Parish church of St John the Baptist, Great Amwell

- Location within Hertfordshire
- Population: 2,223 (Parish, 2021)
- OS grid reference: TL365125
- Civil parish: Great Amwell
- District: East Hertfordshire
- Shire county: Hertfordshire
- Region: East
- Country: England
- Sovereign state: United Kingdom
- Post town: WARE
- Postcode district: SG12
- Dialling code: 01920
- Police: Hertfordshire
- Fire: Hertfordshire
- Ambulance: East of England

Great Amwell is a village and civil parish in the East Hertfordshire district of Hertfordshire, England. It lies 1 1/2 miles (2.4 km) south-east of Ware, its post town, and about 20 miles (32 km) north of London. At the 2021 census the parish had a population of 2,223.

== History ==
On a hill above the church there are some traces of an Iron Age hill fort, but more substantial remains of the earthworks were destroyed by landscaping of the Old Vicarage gardens in about 1840. To the west, on the road to Hertford, is a large tumulus at Barrowfield.

In the Domesday Book of 1086 Great Amwell and neighbouring Little Amwell were a single parish recorded as "Emmewell". By the 17th century, the name of the village was recorded as Amwell Magna, Much Amwell or Great Amwell. The name is probably derived from a spring to the northeast of the village called Emma's Well, which was used by Sir Hugh Myddelton as one of the sources of the New River in the early 17th century. It is believed to have been named after Queen Emma of Normandy, wife of King Æthelred and King Cnut the Great. A nearby white stone memorial is inscribed with verses from by the Quaker poet, John Scott of Amwell (1730-1783).

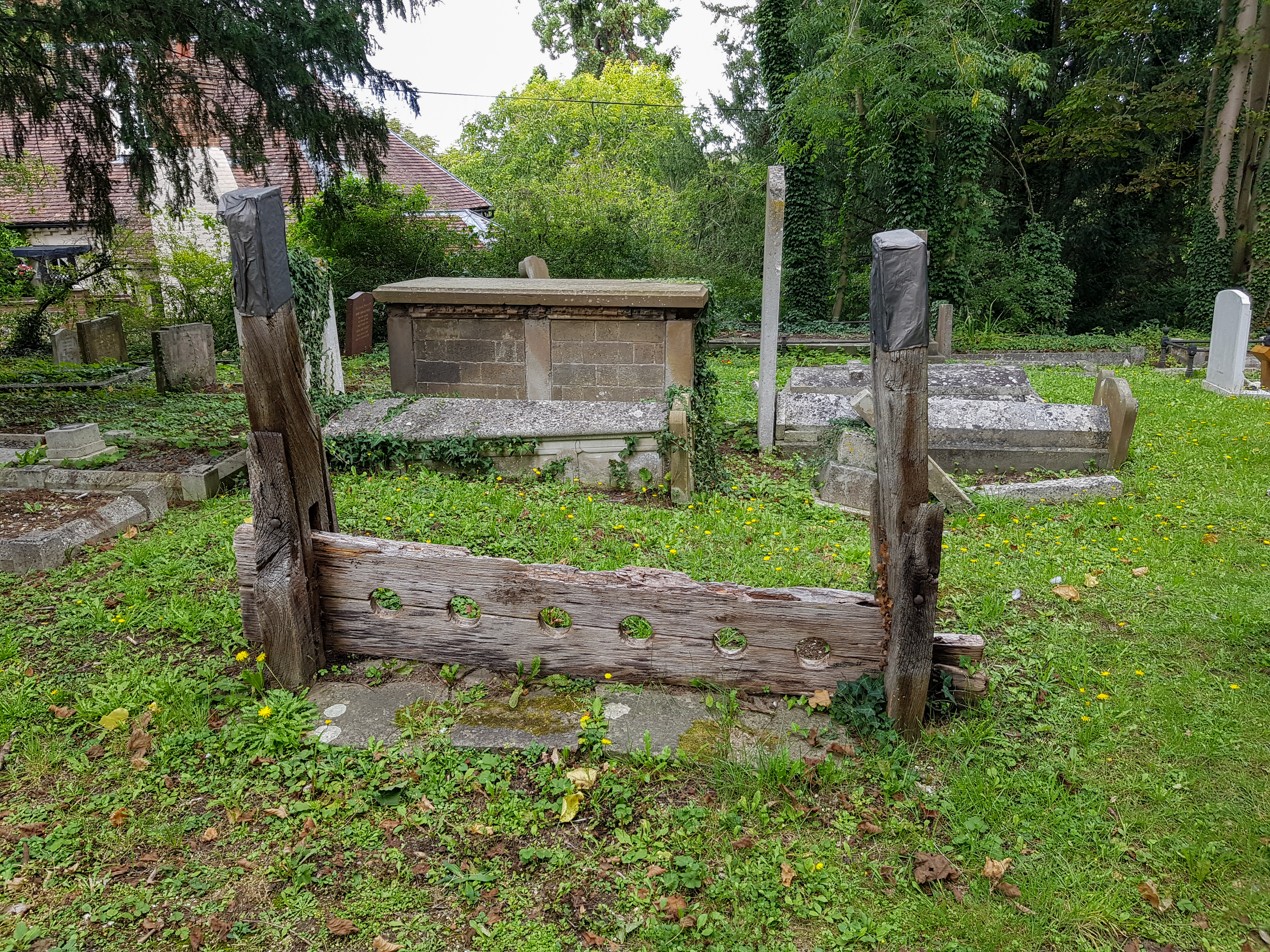
The village stocks in St John's churchyard.

The Church of England parish church is a medieval building dedicated to St John the Baptist. The nave and chancel date from the 11th century with a Norman chancel arch. A bell tower was added in the 15th century and the building was restored in 1866. It is a Grade II* listed building. The stocks in the churchyard date from the 17th or 18th century and were moved there from behind the George IV pub in 1887.

The East India College was founded at the hamlet of Hailey to the south of the parish in 1806, for the education of young men intended for the civil service of the East India Company in India. It was built in the neoclassical style to the design of William Wilkins. When the company was abolished in 1858, the buildings were briefly used as a barracks by the army, but were converted into a public school, Haileybury College, in 1862.

== Governance ==
Great Amwell has three tiers of local government at parish, district, and county level: Great Amwell Parish Council, East Hertfordshire District Council, and Hertfordshire County Council.

Great Amwell was in the hundred of Hertford. The parish was included in the Ware Poor Law Union from 1835. It therefore became part of the Ware Rural District under the Local Government Act 1894. Ware Rural District was abolished in 1974, becoming part of East Hertfordshire.

== Transport ==
The village has no railway station, the nearest being Ware or St Margarets both of which are on the Hertford East branch line which passes through the parish. There are a few bus routes, these are:

- Arriva Shires & Essex route 310 Hertford-Waltham Cross which operates every 30 minutes Monday to Friday daytime and,
- Arriva Shires & Essex route 311 Hertford-Waltham Cross which operates every 30 minutes Monday to Friday daytime and,
- Vectare route 35 Hertford-Bishops Stortford which operates every two hours Monday to Saturday Daytime and hourly Monday to Friday peak hours,
- SM Coaches route 524 Harlow-Hertford which operates hourly Monday to Saturday daytime
- Arriva Shires & Essex Green Line route 724 Harlow-Heathrow Airport which operates hourly daily.

== Notable people ==
Great Amwell has been the residence of some celebrated literary characters, among whom are:

- Izaak Walton, (1593–1683), the noted angler;
- John Scott of Amwell, (1730–83), author of several poems and tracts, who built a grotto containing several apartments, which still exists;
- John Hoole, (1727–1803), translator of Tasso and biographer of John Scott of Amwell;
- Rev Robert Scott Mylne FRSE FSSA FSA, (1854-1920), antiquarian, vicar of Amwell, where he is buried in the Mylne vault.

Others buried in Amwell include:

- William Warner, (1558?-1609), poet and historian;
- Alexander Small, (1710-1794), Scottish surgeon and frequent correspondent of Benjamin Franklin;
- Harold Abrahams in 1978, Olympian depicted in the film Chariots of Fire;
- Sybil Evers, (1904–1963), English singer and actress.

Richard Warren (d. 1628), a passenger on the Mayflower in 1620, who settled in Plymouth Colony and co-signed the Mayflower Compact, was married on 14 April 1610 at Great Amwell to Elizabeth Walker, daughter of Augustine Walker. Richard and Elizabeth are the ancestors of two U.S. Presidents, Ulysses S. Grant and Franklin Delano Roosevelt.

== See also ==
- The Hundred Parishes
