= Ware railway station =

Railway station in Hertfordshire, England

Ware
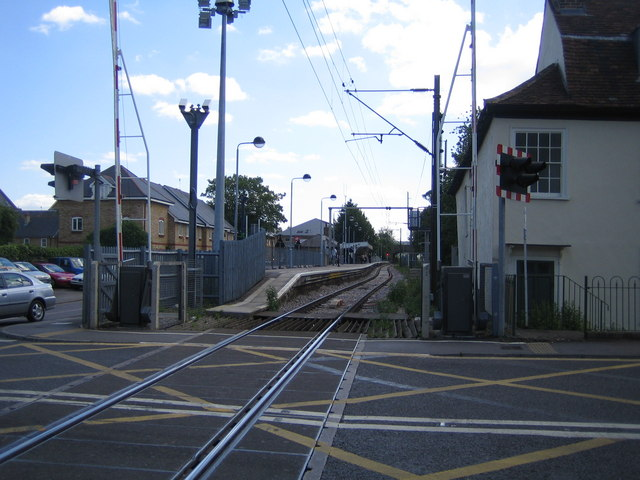
- Interactive map of Ware

General information
- Location: Ware
- Local authority: District of East Hertfordshire
- Grid reference: TL360139
- Managed by: Greater Anglia
- Station code: WAR
- DfT category: D
- Number of platforms: 1
- Accessible: Yes
- Fare zone: B

National Rail annual entry and exit
- 2020–21: ▼0.234 million
- 2021–22: ▲0.651 million
- 2022–23: ▲0.807 million
- 2023–24: ▲1.013 million
- 2024–25: ▲1.068 million

Railway companies
- Original company: Northern and Eastern Railway
- Pre-grouping: Great Eastern Railway
- Post-grouping: London and North Eastern Railway

Key dates
- 31 October 1843: Opened

Other information
- External links: Departures; Facilities
- Coordinates: 51.808°N 0.029°W

Ware railway station is a stop on the Hertford East branch line off the West Anglia Main Line in the East of England, serving the town of Ware, Hertfordshire. It is 22 miles 16 chains (35.7 km) down the line from London Liverpool Street and is situated between St Margarets and Hertford East.

The station and all trains calling are operated by Greater Anglia; its three-letter station code is WAR. It has a single bi-directional platform and track on what is otherwise a double-track railway.

== History ==
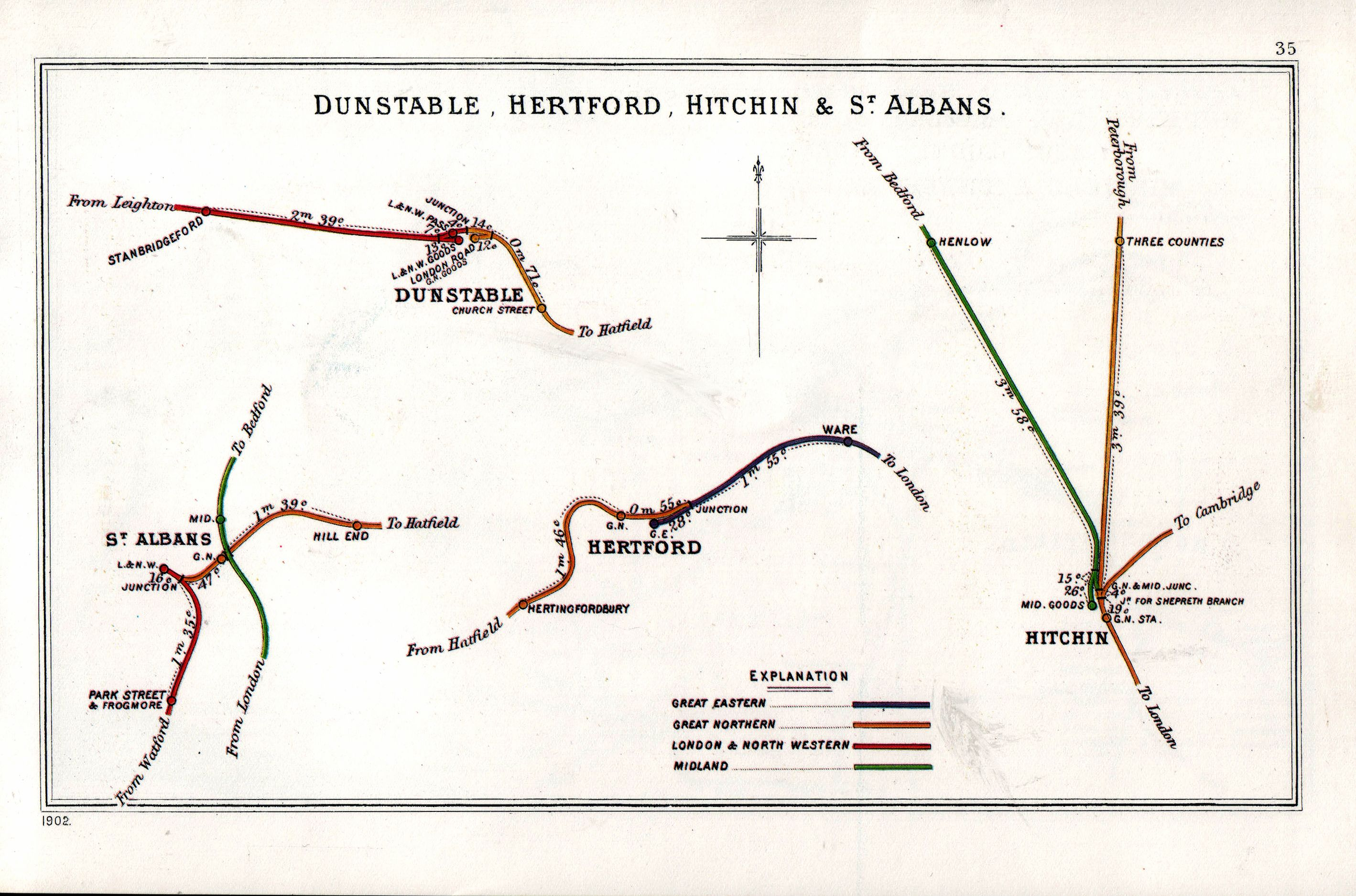
A 1902 Railway Clearing House map of railways in the vicinity of Ware (centre)

The station building dates back to the opening of the line in 1843.

== Services ==
All services at Ware are operated by Greater Anglia, using Class 720 electric multiple units.

The typical off-peak service is two trains per hour in each direction between Hertford East and London Liverpool Street, via Tottenham Hale. Additional services, including trains to and from Stratford call at the station during peak hours. On Sundays, southbound services at the station run to and from Stratford instead of Liverpool Street.

Preceding station	National Rail	Following station
St Margarets	Greater Anglia Hertford East Branch Line	Hertford East
