= Tottenham Hale station =

London Underground and railway station in the London Borough of Haringey

Tottenham Hale
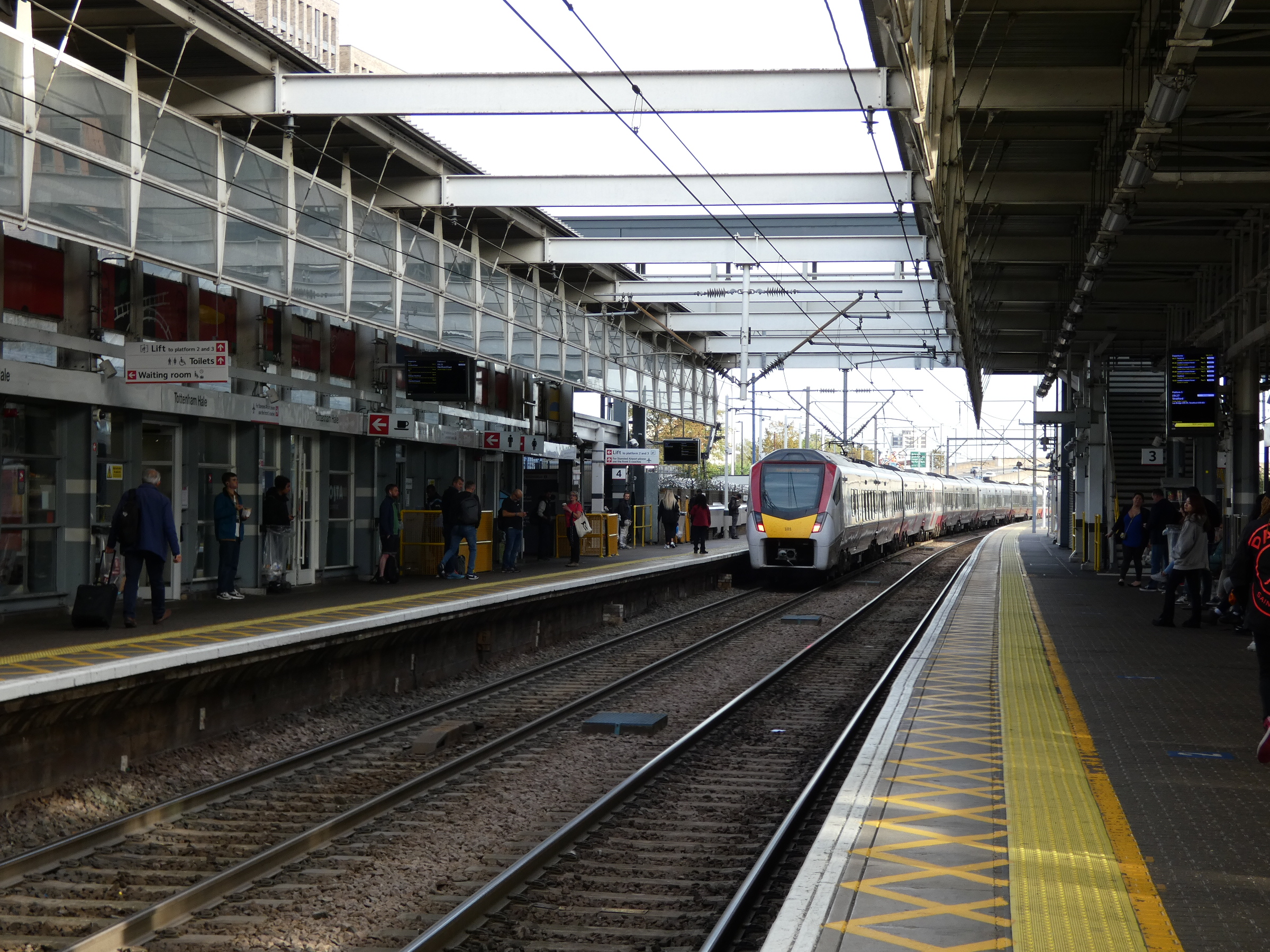
- Interactive map of Tottenham Hale

General information
- Location: Tottenham Hale
- Local authority: London Borough of Haringey
- Managed by: Greater Anglia
- Station code: TOM
- DfT category: D
- Number of platforms: 5 (2 London Underground, 3 National Rail (numbered 2-4))
- Accessible: Yes
- Fare zone: 3

London Underground annual entry and exit
- 2021: ▼7.12 million
- 2022: ▲12.49 million
- 2023: ▲13.24 million
- 2024: ▲13.27 million
- 2025: ▲13.98 million

National Rail annual entry and exit
- 2020–21: ▼2.652 million
- Interchange: ▼0.178 million
- 2021–22: ▲6.096 million
- Interchange: ▲0.408 million
- 2022–23: ▲7.564 million
- Interchange: ▲0.502 million
- 2023–24: ▲8.498 million
- Interchange: ▲0.656 million
- 2024–25: ▲9.256 million
- Interchange: ▲0.751 million

Key dates
- 15 September 1840: Opened (N&ER)
- 1 September 1968: Opened (Victoria line)

Other information
- External links: TfL station info page; Departures; Facilities
- Coordinates: 51.5883°N 0.0597°W

Tottenham Hale is an interchange station located in Tottenham Hale, north London for London Underground and National Rail services. On the National Rail network it is on the Lea Valley Lines section of the West Anglia Main Line, 6 miles (9.7 km) from London Liverpool Street, and is served by Greater Anglia and Stansted Express. On the Underground it is on the Victoria line between Blackhorse Road and Seven Sisters.

The station was opened in 1840, with Underground services added in 1968. A new station building and an additional platform has been added as part of a regeneration scheme.

== History ==
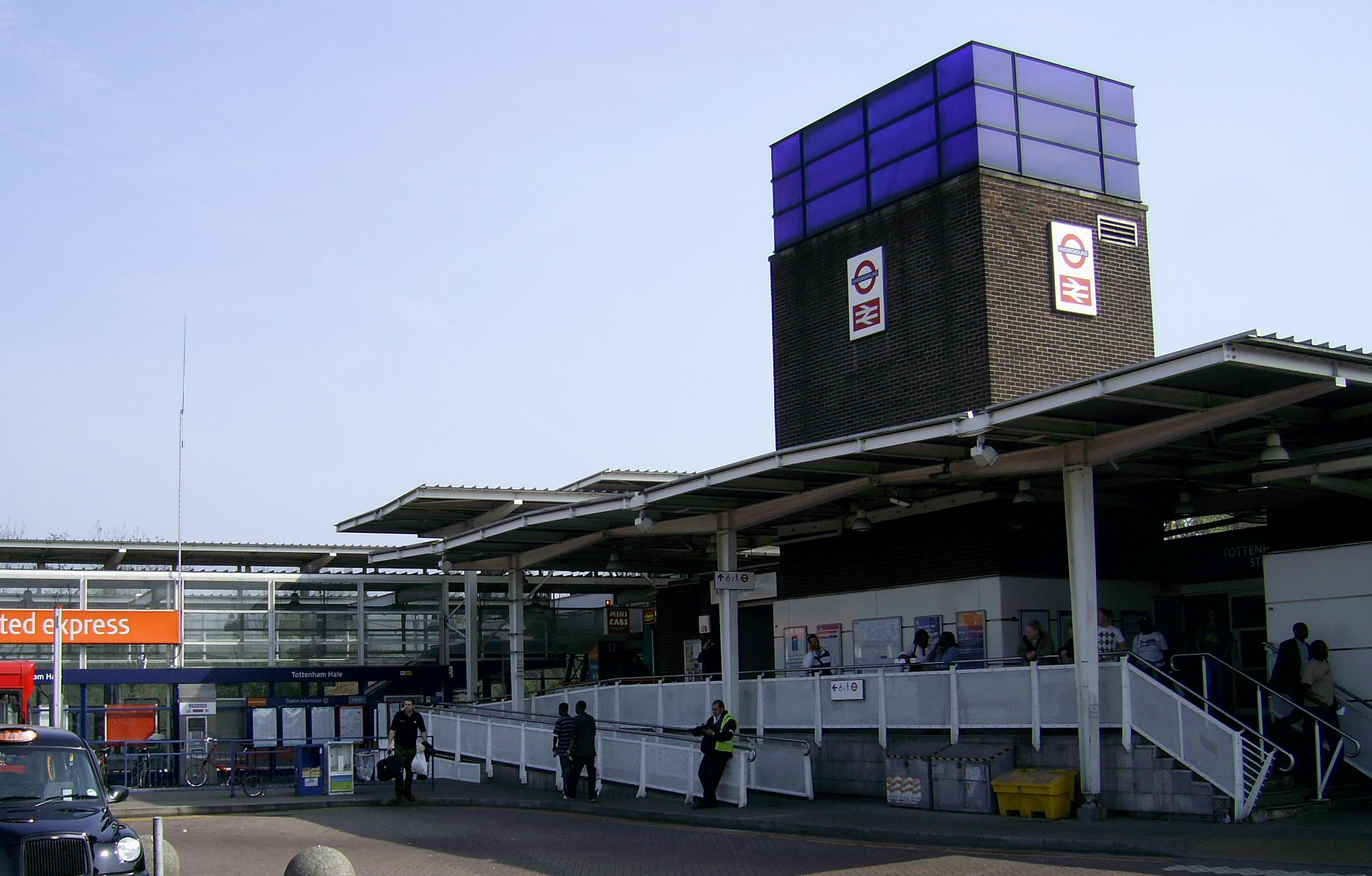
Tottenham Hale station in 2007

The station opened on 15 September 1840 as Tottenham, on the Northern & Eastern Railway (N&ER) line from Stratford in east London to Broxbourne in Hertfordshire. The Northern and Eastern Railway was leased by the Eastern Counties Railway in 1844 who took over operation of the line. Until 1868 Tottenham Hale was a railhead for cattle traffic from East Anglia. Trains were unloaded there, and the cattle driven miles down what is now the A10 road towards London. Four years later in 1872 the route via Clapton was opened, offering a slightly more direct route to Liverpool Street.

In 1875, the suffix 'Hale' was added to the station's name; this was removed in November 1938, before being restored in 1968.

In 1882 the line through Tottenham Hale became part of a major rail freight artery, with the opening of the Great Northern and Great Eastern Joint Railway. This provided a link for the Great Eastern from the coalfields in the north to London. This led to a second pair of running lines known as the Slow Lines being added in 1913.

In 1963, the link from Tottenham South Junction to the Tottenham and Hampstead Line was closed to passengers, with the end of services to/from Palace Gates via Seven Sisters.

On 14 July 1967, planning permission was granted for the addition of the London Underground Victoria line station. The station was renamed Tottenham Hale on 1 September 1968, when it became an interchange station with London Underground on the opening of the first stage of the Victoria line.

The Lea Valley line between Copper Mill Junction and Cheshunt was electrified at 25 kV in 1969. Many of the private goods sidings were removed at this time.

In February 2012 operation of the station changed once again, with Greater Anglia taking over the franchise.

=== Accidents and incidents ===
- On 12 September 1858 a passenger train collided with some goods wagons that had been shunted onto the main line. Nobody was seriously injured. Eighteen months later on 20 February 1860 the station was the site of a serious railway accident when a locomotive derailed, killing the driver, fireman and seven passengers.
- On 29 August 1913 a northbound mail train (carrying passengers) ran into the back of a freight train just south of the station at Tottenham South Junction. The cause was a signal passed at danger in foggy conditions. Two passengers were badly injured, 16 less so.
- The area was always susceptible to flooding, one of the worst instances being between 18 and 22 February 1919 when the River Lea overflowed its banks and rail traffic was suspended.
- On 12 February 1927 an express passenger train, hauled by LNER Class D15 4-4-0 No. 8808, was in collision with a lorry on a level crossing. Owing to foggy conditions, the train was not travelling at high speed.
- On 4 October 1929, another accident occurred at Tottenham North Junction (just south of the station) when a goods train, hauled by LNER Class J15 0-6-0 No. 7938, passed a signal at danger and was hit by a passenger train, which was hauled by LNER Class B17 4-6-0 No. 2808 Gunton. There were no fatalities.
- On 21 March 1944 (during World War Two), several incendiary bombs fell close to the station, destroying a lineside hut.

== Passenger volume ==
Passenger Volume at Tottenham Hale (Note: These statistics only cover entries, exits and interchanges at the National Rail station, and do not include the London Underground.)
	2006–07	2007–08	2008–09	2009–10	2010–11	2011–12	2012–13	2013–14	2014–15	2015–16	2016–17	2017–18	2018–19	2019–20	2020–21	2021–22	2022–23
Entries and exits	3,316,037	3,753,982	3,961,490	3,599,516	3,831,805	4,014,020	4,543,876	4,790,567	5,745,036	6,926,144	7,939,000	8,171,404	8,532,344	9,245,492	2,651,550	6,096,468	7,563,650
Interchanges	108,386	166,323	167,547	158,848	190,186	246,556	428,431	599,845	645,205	352,639	367,258	365,900	395,519	574,761	178,317	407,698	502,460

The statistics cover twelve month periods that start in April.

== Tottenham Hale Bus Station ==
Tottenham Hale Bus Station
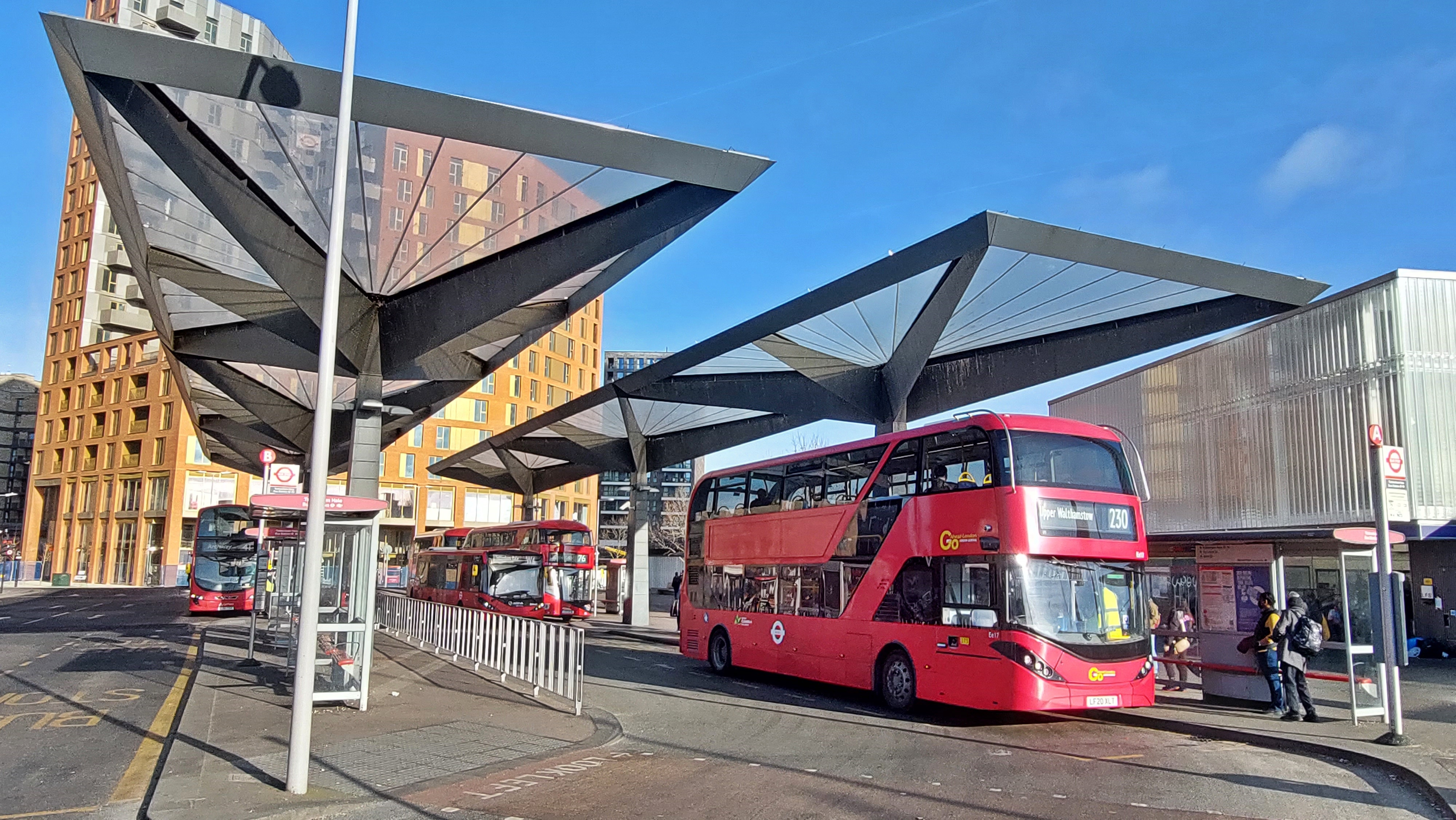
- The bus station in 2023

General information
- Location: Tottenham Hale; Haringey
- Operator: Transport for London
- Bus stands: 4
- Bus operators: Arriva London; Go-Ahead London
- Connections: Victoria Line and National Rail services from Tottenham Hale Station
Location

Tottenham Hale bus station is located beside the railway station.

Following the 2011 England riots which began in Tottenham, a redevelopment of the tube, bus and rail stations was used to encourage investment in the area. The £110 million bus and rail interchange project for Tottenham Hale was completed in 2014. As part of the project the bus station was roofed with ETFE, which is also used in the Eden Project.

The bus station roof was a finalist for Best Urban Design in the 2018 Haringey Design Awards 2018, and in the 2015 British Constructional Steelwork Association Structural Steel Design Awards.

The following bus routes serve the bus station London Buses route 41, 76, 123, 192, 230, W4, N41 and N73.

== Services ==
Tottenham Hale is served by trains operated by Greater Anglia and on London Underground's Victoria line. Off peak services at the station in trains per hour (tph) are:

National Rail

- 8 tph to London Liverpool Street (6 tph fast, 2 tph call at Hackney Downs)
- 4 tph to Stansted Airport (2 tph fast to Bishops Stortford, 2 fast to Harlow Town
- 2 tph to Hertford East (Fast to Ponders End then all stations)
- 2 tph to Cambridge North (Both fast to Cheshunt, then 1 semi-fast and 1 all stations)
- 4 tph to Stratford (via Lea Bridge)
- 2 tph to Meridian Water (calling at Northumberland Park)
- 2 tph to Bishop's Stortford (1 stopping, 1 semi fast)

During peak hours, the station is served by an additional 2 tph to Cambridge. Train calling patters also vary greatly during this period.

On Sundays, the services between Stratford and Bishops Stortford do not run, and the Hertford East services are routed to Stratford via Lea Bridge to maintain the 4tph service.

London Underground

- 27 tph to Walthamstow Central
- 27 tph to Brixton

Preceding station	National Rail	Following station
London Liverpool Street	Stansted Express Stansted Express	Harlow Town or Bishop's Stortford
London Liverpool Street	Greater Anglia West Anglia Main Line	Cheshunt
Hackney Downs	Greater Anglia Lea Valley Lines	Ponders End or Northumberland Park or Cheshunt
Lea Bridge	Greater Anglia Lea Valley Lines	Ponders End or Northumberland Park or Cheshunt
Preceding station	LUL	Following station
Seven Sisters towards Brixton	Victoria line	Blackhorse Road towards Walthamstow Central
	Disused railways	
South Tottenham	Tottenham & Hampstead Junction Railway	Terminus

== Future ==
Transport for London has active plans for the station to be expanded, including:

- extending the existing bridge to form a new Station entrance from Hale Village, providing improved access from the east to Tottenham Hale transport interchange;
- re-routing the London Underground escape route and relocating the vent shaft;
- providing a new, upgraded Station control facility; and
- retail units.

Funding is being sought to increase the number of lines from Coppermill Junction (between Lea Bridge and Tottenham Hale) and Meridian Water to provide a turn-up-and-go four trains per hour service for the Lea Valley.

In February 2013, the Crossrail task force of business group London First, chaired by former Secretary of State for Transport Andrew Adonis, published its recommendations on Crossrail 2, favouring a route almost identical to the regional option proposed by TfL in 2011. The report was endorsed by Network Rail. This proposal will see four tracks restored through Tottenham Hale and direct links to South-West London.

== Bibliography ==
- Butt, R. V. J. (October 1995). The Directory of Railway Stations: details every public and private passenger station, halt, platform and stopping place, past and present (1st ed.). Sparkford: Patrick Stephens Ltd. ISBN 978-1-85260-508-7. OCLC 60251199. OL 11956311M.
