= Hertford East railway station =

Network Rail station in Hertfordshire, England

Hertford East
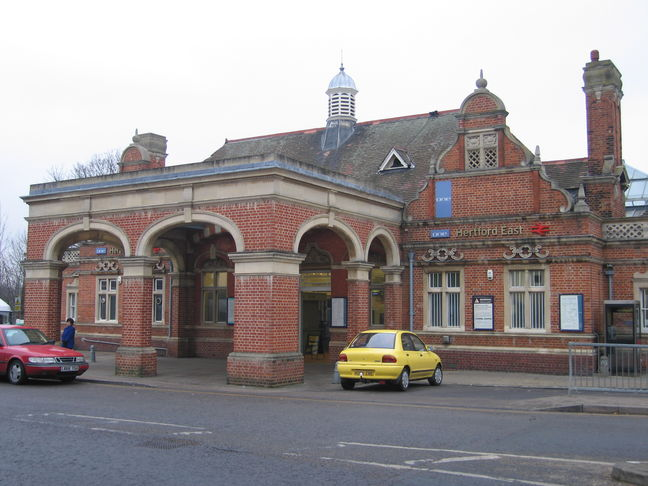
- The main entrance to the station
- Interactive map of Hertford East

General information
- Location: Hertford
- Local authority: District of East Hertfordshire
- Grid reference: TL330129
- Managed by: Greater Anglia
- Station code: HFE
- DfT category: E
- Number of platforms: 2
- Accessible: Yes
- Fare zone: B

National Rail annual entry and exit
- 2020–21: ▼0.243 million
- 2021–22: ▲0.674 million
- 2022–23: ▲0.901 million
- 2023–24: ▲1.011 million
- 2024–25: ▲1.077 million

Railway companies
- Original company: Great Eastern Railway
- Pre-grouping: Great Eastern Railway
- Post-grouping: London and North Eastern Railway

Key dates
- 31 October 1843: first station opened
- 27 February 1888: present station opened as Hertford
- 1 July 1923: Renamed Hertford East

Other information
- External links: Departures; Facilities
- Coordinates: 51.799°N 0.073°W

Hertford East railway station is the northern terminus of the Hertford East branch line off the West Anglia Main Line in the east of England, and is located in the town of Hertford in Hertfordshire. It is 24 miles 19 chains (39.0 km) down the line from London Liverpool Street and is one of two stations in the town, the other being Hertford North on the Hertford Loop Line. Its three-letter station code is HFE.

The station and all trains calling are operated by Greater Anglia.

There are two platforms, although platform number one is generally only used during peak times, during times of disruption and primarily for trains to and from Stratford station.

== History ==
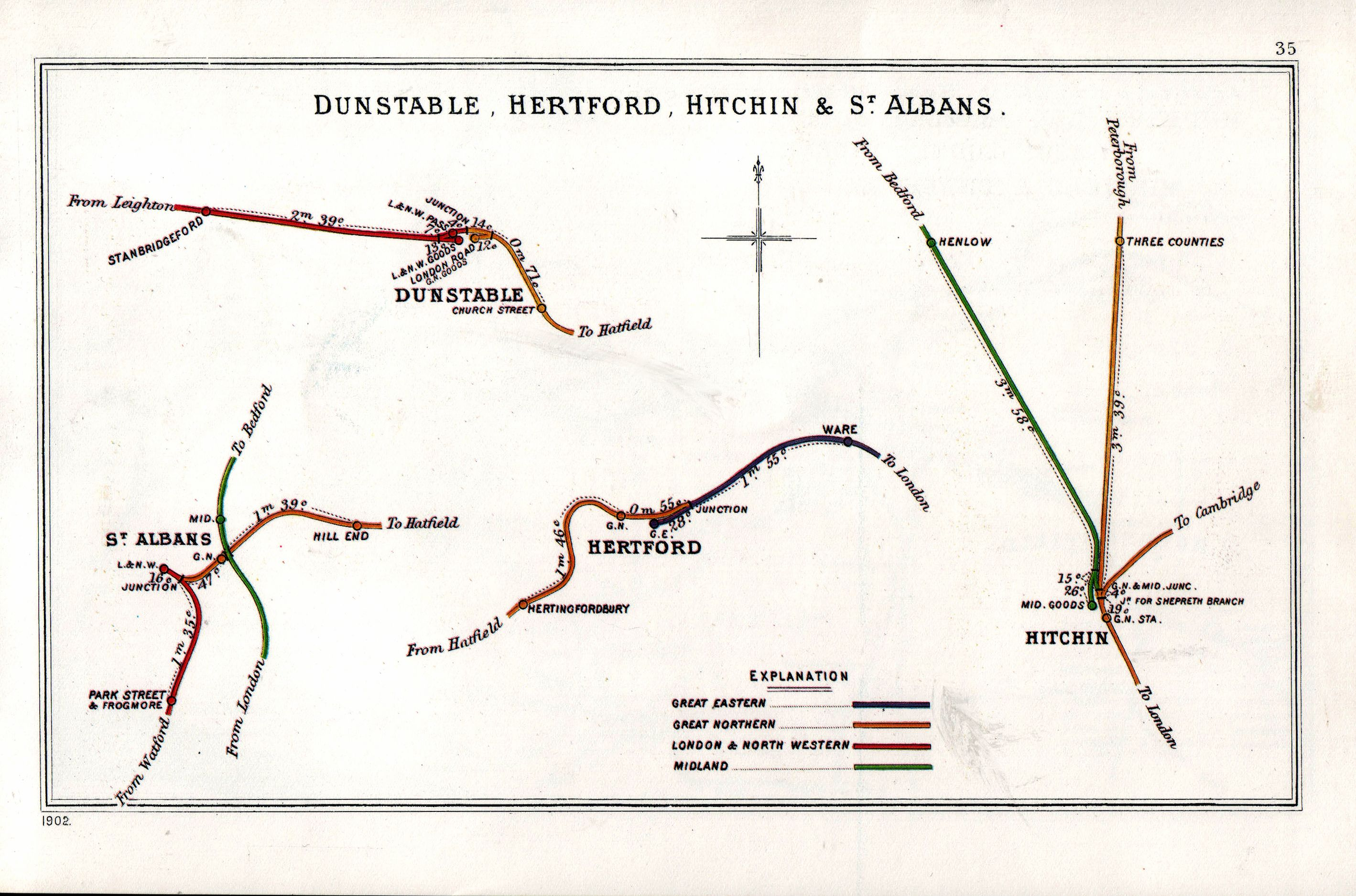
A 1902 Railway Clearing House map of railways in the vicinity of Hertford East (centre, shown here in violet as G.E.)

The first station opened on 31 October 1843 sited to the east of the present station. The current station, designed by W. N. Ashbee, was opened by the Great Eastern Railway on 27 February 1888, replacing the first station. The station was listed in 1974 as a Grade II listed building; in 1996 the buffer stop lights on platform 1 were separately listed in their own right.

The Grade II listed signal box at the station was dismantled in October 2021 to allow for platform extensions. It will be relocated to the Wensleydale Railway.

== Services ==
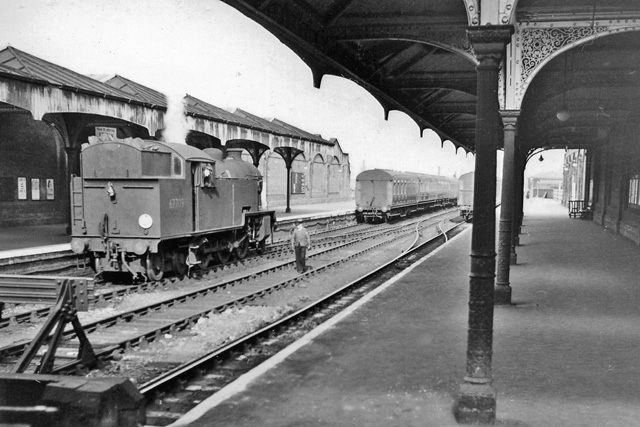
View eastwards, out from stop blocks in 1959

All services at Hertford East are operated by Greater Anglia using Class 720 EMUs.

The typical off-peak service is two trains per hour to and from London Liverpool Street via Tottenham Hale, which start and terminate at Hertford East. Additional services, including trains to and from Stratford, run to and from the station during the peak hours.

On Sundays, services run to and from Stratford instead of London Liverpool Street.

Preceding station	National Rail	Following station
Ware	Greater Anglia Hertford East Branch Line	Terminus

== Proposed developments ==
Some options of the proposed East West Rail involved reopening a route between Hertford East railway station and Hertford North railway station; however a 2009 discussion paper noted that while "the new connection appears technically feasible, doubts must be cast over its public acceptability and deliverability". Since then, a northern route via Bedford and St Neots has been preferred, and flats built on the old route by Hertford Weir would make the cross-Hertford route impracticable.

== In popular culture ==
Hertford East doubles as Yeovil Railway Station in the 1960 film School for Scoundrels, seen in the opening titles and closing credits.

The station features in a number of different channel branding films (called 'Idents' in the television industry) for the ITV channels in the UK. Different, but similar idents have been created for each five of ITV's channels.
