= Community education =

Education centered on dialogue and communication

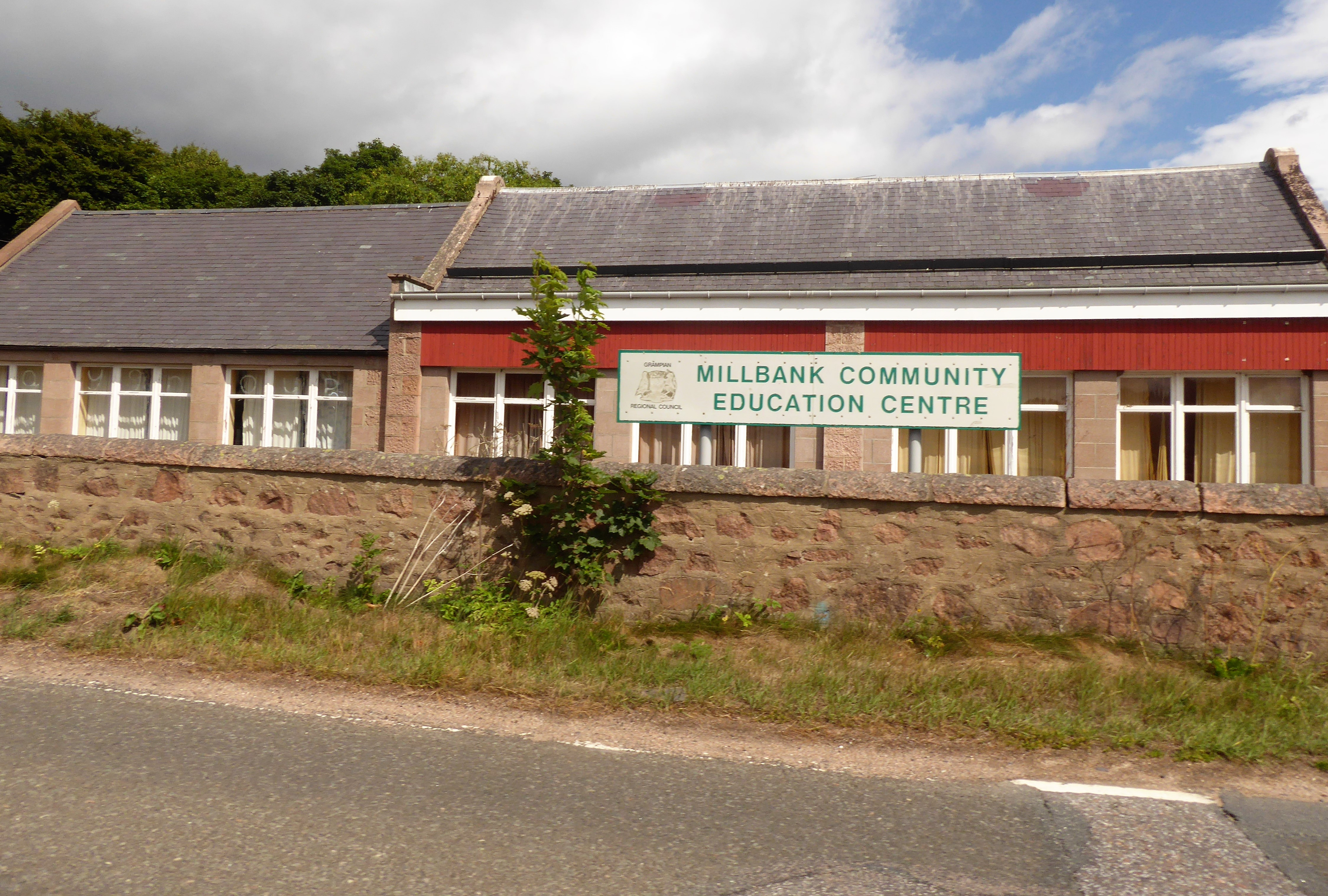
Millbank Community Education Centre in Aberdeenshire, 2018.

Community education, also known as Community-Based Education or Community Learning & Development, or Development Education is an organization's programs to promote learning and social development work with individuals and groups in their communities using a range of formal and informal methods. A common defining feature is that programmes and activities are developed in dialogue with communities and participants. The purpose of community learning and development is to develop the capacity of individuals and groups of all ages through their actions, the capacity of communities, to improve their quality of life. Central to this is their ability to participate in democratic processes.

Community education encompasses all those occupations and approaches that are concerned with running education and development programmes within local communities, rather than within educational institutions such as schools, colleges and universities. The latter is known as the formal education system, whereas community education is sometimes called informal education. It has long been critical of aspects of the formal education system for failing large sections of the population in all countries and had a particular concern for taking learning and development opportunities out to poorer areas, although it can be provided more broadly.

There are a myriad of job titles and employers include public authorities and voluntary or non-governmental organisations, funded by the state and by independent grant making bodies. Schools, colleges and universities may also support community learning and development through outreach work within communities. The community schools movement has been a strong proponent of this since the sixties. Some universities and colleges have run outreach adult education programmes within local communities for decades. Since the seventies the prefix word ‘community’ has also been adopted by several other occupations from youth workers and health workers to planners and architects, who work with more disadvantaged groups and communities and have been influenced by community education and community development approaches.

Community educators have over many years developed a range of skills and approaches for working within local communities and in particular with disadvantaged people. These include less formal educational methods, community organising and group work skills. Since the nineteen sixties and seventies through the various anti poverty programmes in both developed and developing countries, practitioners have been influenced by structural analyses as to the causes of disadvantage and poverty i.e. inequalities in the distribution of wealth, income, land etc. and especially political power and the need to mobilise people power to effect social change. Thus the influence of such educators as Paulo Friere and his focus upon this work also being about politicising the poor.

In the history of community education and community learning and development, the UK has played a significant role in hosting the two main international bodies representing community education and community development. These being the International Community Education Association, which was for many years based at the Community Education Development Centre based in Coventry UK. ICEA and CEDC have now closed, and the International Association for Community Development, which still has its HQ in Scotland. In the 1990s there was some thought as to whether these two bodies might merge. The term community learning and development has not taken off widely in other countries. Although community learning and development approaches are recognised internationally. These methods and approaches have been acknowledged as significant for local social, economic, cultural, environmental and political development by such organisations as the UN, WHO, OECD, World Bank, Council of Europe and EU.

== Definition ==
Community education is often used interchangeably with adult education in Europe, particularly in the United Kingdom. For example, night schools and classes in village halls or community centres had been key opportunities for learning in communities outside of traditional school. Community education bridges the gap between adult education, lifelong learning and community development. John Rennie, former director of the Community Education Development Centre in Coventry, wrote that there are five tenants to defining community education: (1) the best solutions come from collective knowledge and shared experiences involving the community, (2) education is a lifelong activity, (3) use of a variety of resources, (4) each person has a contribution to make, and (5) a sense of citizenship. In the 1960s and 1970s, the UK saw an increase in community development and community action organisations which had the potential to blur the lines between the responsibilities of adult education and community development. However, poverty and social disadvantage emphasised the need for adult education opportunities and a community approach supported the need to meet individual circumstances and to understand barriers to learning. Ian Martin, Honorary Fellow, Community and Society at the University of Edinburgh, has argued that community education "will allow genuinely alternative and democratic agendas to emerge at the local level." In a 1996 UNESCO report known as Learning: The Treasure Within learning throughout life was promoted as benefiting both society and individuals because it allowed them to respond to the changing labour market and social landscape.

== History ==
Community development and planning became more of a priority after the decolonisation of independent states in Asia, Africa, Oceania and the Caribbean, and the Second World War. Community development was first significantly promoted by the United Nations (UN) in the 1950s as a way to develop the socioeconomic prospects of low-income countries by supporting education, housing and healthcare infrastructure. The UN established a Regional and Community Development Division and a Community Development and Organization Section. In the 1970s, a shift in adult education saw practitioners experiment with more informal outreach work within local communities. The International Association for Community Development (IACD) was established in 1953 in the United States, and has since gone on to represent community development at the UN and partner with the United States, UK, Canada, Hungary, Hong Kong, Australia, Europe, New Zealand, Nigeria, India, Philippines, Georgia, Ireland and Kenya. The IACD includes community education as a way in which community development can empower people within their communities.

=== In the UK ===
==== England and Wales ====
In July 1917 the British government, under Lloyd George, established The Ministry of Reconstruction. This governmental department aimed to address a number of political and social areas including employment, housing and industrial relations. In 1919, The Ministry of Reconstruction Adult Education Committee (AEC) published the Final Report in which it argued that adult education was a "permanent national necessity." The AEC was chaired by A.L. Smith, and members included historian and social critic R.H. Tawney. Tawney believed that adult education was a democratic bottom-up process, that acts as a space for individuals to challenge and change their community. In the Final Report the need for adult education is described as individuals desire for "adequate opportunities for self-expression and the cultivation of their personal powers and interests." The 1919 Final Report identified a number of challenges that education may help to improve and these include; international cooperation, gender equality, maintaining democracy, and employment and the quality of work.

The UK underwent a reform in social welfare during and after the inter-war period. Community centres were built in newly established suburban housing estates under the 1936 Housing Act and the 1937 Physical Training and Recreation Act, and the Education Act 1944 introduced the Youth and Community Service. In the Ministry of Education pamphlet A Guide to the Education System of England and Wales (1945) it is stated that:

A more recent development has been the decision of the Government that the provision of community centres where men and women can meet for social and educational purposes and for recreation should be regarded as coming within the scope of the education service. Local education authorities are now expected to review the needs of their areas and provide such centres, which will have buildings of their own and full-time staff.

— Ministry of Education, A Guide to the Educational System of England and Wales (1945)

In a 1944 booklet entitled Citizen Centres for Adult Education by the Education Settlements Association (see, Settlement movement), posits adult education as vital to the "social reconstruction" of post-war Britain. One of the main challenges identified in the booklet is provision of centres and states that "the primary function of any local citizen centre should be the progressive development of the individual as a member of a free society, through mental training, the encouragement of self-effort, and the exercise of personal responsibility."

During the 1960s, Britain experienced increased poverty. In a 1965 survey entitled The Poor and the Poorest, Peter Townsend and Brian Abel-Smith measured poverty as the rate of people receiving National Assistance and, from this, they found approximately 14% of British people were living in poverty. British social researcher, Richard Titmuss published his book Income Distribution and Social Change in 1962, and argued that the wealth divide between classes was much wider than shown in official statistics. In 1965 the Seebohm Committee was established to investigate and review the work of social services in Britain. The subsequent Seebohm Report was published in 1968 and recommended greater integration between social care services and other health and social welfare services, particularly proposing the creation of a single family services department. The Seebohm Committee's work bolstered interest in community work as it was seen as a way to facilitate plans for social change. The Seebohm Report argued that in order to prevent delinquency, social work should be involved in encouraging positive community values and empowering people to help themselves. In 1965 a study group, chaired by Dame Eileen Younghusband and funded by the Calouste Gulbenkian Foundation, investigated the role of community work in Britain and how best to go about training community workers. The study group published their findings in 1968 and defined community work "as a means of giving life to local democracy" and said that community work was important to coordinate and develop "services within and among organisations in a local community." In response to concern about poverty and social inequalities in Britain, Prime Minister Harold Wilson introduced the National Community Development Projects (CDPs) in 1969. Subsequently this influenced creation of the Urban Aid Programme, which allocated grants to local authorities to support education, housing, and social care organisations. Martin Loney described the CDPs as "the story of Britain's largest ever government funded social experiment." The rationale of the CDPs, and similar American projects such as the Community Action Programmes for Juvenile Delinquency, was that social issues were local and caused by individual pathology.

CDPs were established in 12 cities and towns in Coventry, Liverpool, Southwark, Glyncorrwg, Bately, Birmingham, Canning Town, Cumbria, Newcastle, Oldham, Paisley and North Shields. The aim was for researchers to identify local issues, and work alongside the local community to provide and evaluate different methods of intervention. A number of reports were published particularly by the North Tyneside CDP, following CDPs research, and these include Whatever Happened to Council Housing (1976), Gilding the Ghetto (1979) and Costs of Industrial Change (1981).

In 1973, Adult Education: A Plan for Development was published by the Department of Education, also known as the Russell Report. The Russell Committee was chaired by Sir Lionel Russell and was first established by the Labour Government in 1969. However, the after the 1979 election, the Conservative Government under Margaret Thatcher came into power and this may have effected the approach of the Committee. The reports recognised that there was increased demand for adult education and that with "modest" investment could benefit adult education greatly to make use of existing resources. The General Statement of the Russell Report explained:

[Adult Education] is an agent changing and improving our society: but for each individual the means of change may differ and each must develop in his own way, at his own level and through his own talents.

— Russell Committee, The Russell Report, Paragraph 6, General Statement

The committee expressed that adult learning should be directed by the learner's individual needs e.g. for vocational reasons, for employment or to upskill in a job. The Report outlined ten important recommendations; (1) establishment of a Development Council for Adult Education for England and Wales, (2) ongoing partnership between statutory and voluntary bodies when providing adult learning, (3) the secretary of state should provide guidance in accordance with the Education Act 1944 for how Local Education Authorities (LEAs) should provide adult learning, (4) increase number of full-time staff employed in adult learning with appropriate career and salary structures, (5) offer access to qualifications at all levels for adult learners, (6) targeted provision should be available for "disadvantaged adults", (7) increase in accommodation, premises, available for adult learning, (8) maintain funding structure for universities, (9) the Workers Educational Association (WEA) should be funded by LEAs and the Department for Education, and (10) greater opportunities for residential adult education. The Russell Committee were obliged to focus on non-vocational adult education. The Russell Report supported the use of the Direct Grant that funds were specifically stipulated for adult learning bodies. The Committee conducted research for the Report, and they recommended that programmes for learning should be developed specifically for disadvantaged individuals. 'Disadvantaged' is defined, in The Russell Report, as "[...] the extent to which integration into society" is influenced by physical or mental health, poverty or social deprivation, or lack of basic education, learning impairment or language barriers.

In 1977 the Advisory Council for Adult and Continuing Education (ACACE) was established in 1977 after the Russell Report and was chaired by British sociologist Richard Hoggart until 1983. The Council established committees related to national educational policies, conceptualising continuing education, for example integrating higher education and vocational training. In 1979, the ACACE carried out a survey of adult learners' access to higher education and they conclude that "recurrent post-secondary education could be established without heavy new expenditure, especially on capital projects. The basis of the system is there." In another 1979 paper entitled Towards Continuing Education: a discussion paper, the ACACE argue that adult education should include vocational training under the Employment Acts and the Education Acts. The ACACE defined adult education as a social policy concept, meaning that it would address issues relating to social change and the economy, and Naomi McIntosh argued that the council helped to change people's attitudes about adult education.

In 1987, the National Vocational Qualifications (NVQs) was introduced in England, Wales and Northern Ireland as framework to standardise vocational qualifications. This followed the creation of the National Council for Vocational Qualifications (NCVQ), consisting of members appointed by the secretary of state for education and employment. The council aimed to accreddit qualifications, and assign levels to qualifications within the NVQ framework. Criticism of the framework, however, ranged from less flexibility for learners, too bureaucratic and the expense of new assessment procedures. In his book 'Russell and After: The Politics of Adult Learning (1969-1997)', Peter Clyne argues that "by concentrating on vocational qualifications and work-related skills and knowledge, the NCVQ was moving against the flow of the conclusions and recommendations of the Russell Committee and ACACE. A potentially damaging rift was being created between different forms of adult learning."

The UK Government published the Green paper entitled 'The Learning Age: a renaissance for a new Britain' in February 1998 presented by the then Secretary of State for Education and Employment David Blunkett. The paper describes learning as "contributing to social cohesion" and that it "fosters a sense of belonging, responsibility and identity." The paper also proposes setting up an Adult and Community Learning Fund "to sustain and encourage new schemes locally that help men and women gain access to education, including literacy and numeracy."

National Training Organisations (NTOs) worked in partnership across education with the government and third sector to: identify skill shortages, develop occupational standards, provide advice on training and communicate between partners. PAULO was an NTO for community-based learning and development established in January 2000. PAULO was concerned with the educational need of learners but also of the staff and their training by focusing on: appropriate community venues, prioritising voluntary learning, emphasising links between learning, individual and collective action and citizenship, promoting social inclusion and equality, and widening participation in lifelong learning.

The Learning and Skills Act 2000 was introduced and established the Learning and Skills Council (LSC) to ensure provision of education and training for young people and adults. Local LSCs were also established to guide local education authorities with providing adult and community learning opportunities. The Adult Learning Inspectorate (ALI) was a non-departmental public body established under the 2000 Act and headed by the Inspectorate David Sherlock. However, the UK Government established the Office for Standards in Education (OFSTED) in 1990 and advising on adult learning and community education came under its remit in 2007, replacing the ALI.

The Institute for Employment Studies published 'Adult Learning in England: a Review' in 2000 alongside The National Institute of Adult Continuing Education (NIACE) and gave an account of the services involved in providing community education. NIACE was an educational charity, founded in 1921, to promote adult learning in England and Wales before it became part of the Learning and Work Institute in 2016. The main agencies and services identified in the 2000 review are listed below as their current iterations:

1. Ministerial Departments e.g. the Department for Education
2. Jobcentre Plus (as part of the Department for Work and Pensions)
3. Local Education Authorities (LEAs)
4. Education and Skills Funding Agency
5. Voluntary and charity organisations
6. The National Careers Service
7. The Open University (OU)
8. BBC Schools
9. Employers
10. Trade Unions

Adult education is devolved in the UK, as well as regional authorities in England. Devolution deals in England were established in the Apprenticeships, Skills, Children and Learning Act 2009. Devolved authorities are responsible for allocating the Adult Education Budget (AEB) and meeting the needs of local employers. Between 2018 and 2019, adult education functions were transferred to certain mayoral combined authorities (MCAs) under the Local Democracy, Economic Development and Construction Act 2009. From 2022 to 2023, the Department of Education had devolved approximately 60% of the AEB to 9 MCAs and the mayor of London. The regional authorities were: Cambridgeshire and Peterborough, Greater London Authority, Greater Manchester, Liverpool City Region, North of Tyne, South Yorkshire, Tees Valley, West Midlands, West of England, and West Yorkshire. Between August and December 2022, under the Sunak Government, the Department for Education established devolution deals with: Cornwall, East Midlands, Norfolk, the North East, Suffolk, and York and North Yorkshire.

In January 2021, the Department for Education published the White Paper "Skills for Jobs: Lifelong Learning for Opportunity and Growth" which aimed to "strengthen links between employers and further education providers." In 2020 the then Prime Minister Boris Johnson delivered a speech on the Lifetime Skills Guarantee in which he stated the education system in England "will move to a system where every student will have a flexible lifelong loan entitlement to four years of post-18 education – and suddenly, with that four year entitlement, and with the same funding mechanism, you bring universities and FE closer together." The White Paper made recommendations that aimed to deliver on the Lifetime Skills Guarantee by implementing a flexible Lifelong Loan Entitlement "to the equivalent of four years post-18 education from 2025." A major theme of the Paper was emphasising the role of employers working with education providers, and it recommends developing 'Local Skills Improvement Plans' to match skills with the needs of the labour market, including technical skills as well as improving english, maths and digital skills. £2.5 billion is proposed as a 'National Skills Fund' to upskill and reskill adult learners. Statutory guidance for Local Skills Improvement Plans was published in October 2022, in reference to the Skills and Post-16 Education Act 2022, and states that the Plans should set out key priorities and represent the needs of employers and how to address skill needs of employers in partnership with local education services.

===== Welsh policy =====
In 2012, the Welsh Government published guidance for providers of adult education and adult learners entitled "Education for Sustainable Development and Global Citizenship: A common understanding for the adult and community learning sector." The report encouraged partnership between Adult and Community Learning (ACL) practitioners and Education for Sustainable Development and Global Citizenship (ESDGC):

The ACL sector is incredibly diverse in its learners, providers and in the curriculum areas on offer. The ACL sector is well placed to deliver ESDGC to the hardest-to reach learners who may otherwise not engage with mainstream education. ACL is delivered by local authorities, voluntary and community organisations, further education (FE) institutions, higher education (HE) institutions, work-based learning providers and others including prisons, museums and libraries. There is a rich history of adult learning in Wales, and lifelong learning remains at the forefront of Welsh Government policy.

— Welsh Government, Education for Sustainable Development and Global Citizenship: A common understanding for the adult and community learning sector (2012)

ESDGC is defined as supporting individuals to understand issues around climate change, food provision, biodiversity, international wars, terrorism and poverty.

The current adult and community learning strategy in Wales was published in 2017. The policy states its vision as "a Wales where learning is at the core of all we do; where participation in learning is encouraged and rewarded; and where people have equal opportunities to gain the skills for life and work that they need to prosper." The focus is on supporting adults with essential skills such as communication, ESOL, numeracy, digital skills, and employability skills.

==== Scotland ====
Community education in Scotland was established after the publication of the Alexander Report in 1975 entitled 'Adult Education: the Challenge of Change' chaired by Sir Kenneth Alexander. The Alexander Report encouraged merging adult education, youth work and community development into one service. The Report referred to adult education as "voluntary leisure time courses" which "have no specific vocational purpose and which are voluntarily attended by a student in the time when he is not engaged in his normal daily occupation." Recommendations also included prioritising areas of multiple deprivation to serve disadvantaged communities, to make better use of colleges, and the establishment of a Scottish Council for Community Education. The publication of the Report coincided with local government reform in Scotland, which saw the creation of new larger local authorities under the Local Government (Scotland) Act 1973. As a result of the report adult education, community development and youth work were redefined as the Community Education Service, but many adult educators and youth workers did not change their professional approach. A report about training was developed by the Scottish Community Education Council in 1984.

The Scottish Community Education Council (SCEC) was established in 1982, first chaired by Scottish academic and activist Baroness Elizabeth Carnegy. The SCEC would go on to be chaired by Ralph Wilson, Dorothy Dalton, Esther Robertson, and Charlie McConnell until 2002. Training for Change was a report published after the SCEC created second working party on training chaired by Geoffrey Drought in 1984 and defined community education as "purposive developmental and educational programmes and structures which afford opportunities for individual and collective growth and change throughout life." The Report focused on the need to provide flexible community education training and recommended improving the quality of fieldwork practice and supervision for community educators. The 1980s saw the expansion of community education projects in some of the largest Scottish local authority areas, for example, Strathclyde, and Lothian and Tayside. In 1979, the Adult Learning Project (ALP) was established which introduced a number of learning initiatives in the Gorgie Dalry area of Edinburgh. The ALP was financed by the Scottish Education Department and the Lothian Regional Council, as part of the Urban Aid project. The ALP developed learning opportunities by conducting secondary source investigation into the local area, primary source investigation by making contact with people in the community, finding co-investigators by recruiting volunteers from the public, building codifications which involved codifying themes from their findings to understand objectives and actions for the project to meet the needs of the community, and lastly developing appropriate learning opportunities. In 1989, the Community Education Validation and Endorsement Group (CeVe) was created with the remit to develop guidelines for the validation of community education training, and the competencies they developed included: engaging appropriately with local communities, empower individuals and groups, and to gather and use evaluative data to improve and develop programmes.

In 1998, a working group was created chaired by Douglas Osler to explore community education in Scotland, and worked alongside the Council of Scottish Local Authorities (COSLA). COSLA was established in 1975 as a national association of Scottish councils and defines itself as "the voice of Local Government in Scotland." The Osler Report entitled "Communities: Change through Learning" was published in November 1998 aimed to address "long-term confusion between community education as a way of working and community education as an amalgam of the 3 fields." Gordon Mackie et al. (2011) argue that Osler Committee approached community education under the vision of New Labour's Third Way, seeing it as a technique instead of one means of a service to the community. The Osler Report recommended that local authorities should develop community learning plans that met the needs of communities and that also contribute to the Government's aims for social inclusion, lifelong learning and active citizenship.

Following the Osler Report, the Scottish Executive published "Working and Learning Together to build stronger communities" in 2004 and in which the community education service is renamed as 'Community Learning and Development' (CLD). It set out 3 national priorities for CLD: (1) achievement through learning for adults by providing learning opportunities to improve core skills of literacy, numeracy, communications, working with others, problem-solving and information communications technology (ICT), (2) achievement through learning for young people, and (3) achievement through building community capacity. Structurally, practice changed from a Community Education Service to local and regional CLD Partnerships. Partnerships, in the 2004 report, are made up of local authority services (e.g. education, social work, community services, environmental protection, housing, arts and leisure, and libraries), as well as agency and voluntary partners representing issues (e.g. tenant's organisations, local youth and community councils, and equalities groups). The Scottish Executive also established a Ministerial Advisory Committee to conduct the Community Education Training Review (CETR), resulting in the "Empowered to Practice: The future of community learning and development training in Scotland" in 2003. This report concluded that there should be a stronger disciplinary system for practitioners, which may be achieved by greater management in the service. The recommendations from this report were furthered and resulted in the creation of a Short Life Task Group (SLTG) in 2004 chaired by Professor Ted Milburn.

The SLTG was given the remit to advise Ministers " regarding the establishment of a practitioner-led body responsible for validation, endorsement, accreditation and registration for community learning and development, with enhanced capacity, building upon the work of CeVe (Community Education Validation and Endorsement)." Findings from the SLTG resulted in the publication of the Milburn Report entitled "Strengthening Standards: Improving the Quality of Community Learning and Development Service Delivery" in January 2006. The main distinction was the recommendation to consider practice as a profession funded by the government. The proposed 'professional body' would have "independent status" and have responsibilities including: developing a qualifications framework for continuing professional development (CPD), and registration for practitioners to distinguish between practitioners who are qualified in CLD or Community Education and those who are not. Ministers agreed to establish a CLD Standards Council and an interim council was established in 2007. In February 2008, the Cabinet Secretary for Education and Lifelong Learning directed the CLD Standards Council to:

- Deliver a professional approvals structure for qualifications, courses and development for CLD practitioners
- Consider and establish a registration system for practitioners
- Develop and establish a model of CPD and training for practitioners

Development of The CLD Standards Council was officially completed in December 2008.

The most recent review of Community Learning Development (CLD) in Scotland was commissioned by the then Minister for Higher and Further Education and Veterans Graeme Dey in December 2023 and led by independent reviewer Kate Still. The report entitled "Learning: For All. For Life. A report from the Independent Review of Community Learning and Development (CLD)" was published in July 2024. Emphasis of the report was placed on "the extent to which CLD is contributing to delivering positive outcomes in line with Scottish Government priorities, including examination of the respective roles and responsibilities of those involved." The review made a number of recommendations in six key areas (1) leadership and structures, (2) overarching policy narratives, (3) focus on delivery, (4) budgets and funding, (5) developing the workforce and standards, and (6) demonstrating impact. Recommendations under the first key area included; establishing a joint CLD Strategic Leadership Group between the Scottish Government and COSLA, improve consistency within local authority structures, and regular reports to the Scottish Government. The second key area involved recommending development of a clear and cohesive policy narrative on life-long learning. Focus on delivery recommendations emphasised the importance of establishing a detailed prioritised and timed delivery plan and tackling the "current ESOL crisis". The fourth key area recommended reassessing the current balance of spending and the fifth key area recommended developing a CLD Workforce Plan. Lastly, demonstrating impact involved recommendations such as funding Scotland's participation in the OECD International Survey of Adult Skills (PIAAC), and creating an annual celebration of CLD success.

CLD is described by the Scottish Government as:

a professional practice within education with delivery stretching across all stages of lifelong learning. The purpose of CLD is to provide early intervention and prevention to those experiencing, or at risk of experiencing, inequality of opportunity within the education and skills system.

— CLD Independent Review (2024), Scottish Government

The main statutory basis for CLD currently is provided by The Requirements for Community Learning and Development (Scotland) Regulations 2013. The requirements only legally apply to local authorities, but are intended for all those who partner with local authorities in working towards shared outcomes for CLD. The policy includes strategic guidance on how local authorities can: develop partnership working, identify a range of partners, develop activities to deliver CLD outcomes, and improve performance. Practitioners can work in CLD without formal qualifications, with relevant experience, but it is often required by local authorities for practitioners to complete an approved professional qualification. Undergraduate degree and postgraduate qualifications in the subject are offered at the following Scottish universities: University of Dundee, The University of Edinburgh, University of Glasgow, University of the Highlands and Islands and University of West of Scotland.

==== Republic of Ireland ====
In the 1960s, there was limited government investment in community education for adults. The Irish Committee, chaired by Con Murphy and appointed in 1969 by Brian Lenihan, Minister of Education, defined adult education as facilities for adults outside of full-time school education to "learn whatever they need to learn at any period of their lives." The report entitled 'Adult Education in Ireland' or The Murphy Report, similar to the Russell Report, was published in 1973. It went on to provide five features of adult education, that must be met for the term to apply. These are; (1) must be "purposefully educative" meaning the learner must be motivated to learn, (2) must be "systematic" to reach agreed learning outcomes, (3) must last for longer than a single session, (4) must be an alternative to self-directed learning, require some tuition, and (5) must be "continuously evaluated or assessed and reinforced". The Murphy Report outlined 22 recommendations to develop adult education in Ireland, which included the need for better understanding of the literacy challenges facing adults.

In 1969 the non-governmental organisation Aos Oideachais Náisiúnta Trí Aontú Saorálach or The Irish National Association of Adult Education (AONTAS) was created by a group of individuals interested in community adult learning. The idea for the AONTAS was first formed by Liam Carey, from the Dublin Institute of Adult Education, after he delivered a seminar about adult education in Ireland in May 1968. Following this, a committee was established with the remit to set up a National Association of Adult Education. AONTAS was formally created in May 1969 as a "think tank for adult educators" wrote Carey. In 1974, following The Murphy Report, the Archdiocese of Dublin established the first adult literacy service in Ireland, the Dublin Literacy Scheme as part of the Dublin Institute of Adult Education. Demand for the Dublin Literacy Scheme led to AONTAS forming a separate organisation specifically focusing on adult literacy, the National Adult Literacy Agency (NALA). The NALA constitution, amended in 1984, defined its aim as "To advance the means of promoting adult literacy in Ireland, where literacy is taken as an integral part of adult basic education and adult continuing education."

In 1981 the Irish minister of education established a review of lifelong learning, and chaired by Ivor Kenny, this became known as The Kenny Report published in 1984. The Kenny Report argued for the importance of a structured adult education system, that met the needs of all adults, including those with fundamental basic needs. However, two of the report's recommendations were implemented: ad hoc Adult Education Boards were established in Vocational Educational Committee's, and the Adult Literacy and Community Education Budgets were created. Despite this, the Department of Education and Science described the Kenny Report as having:

[...] little impact on an education system already straining to cope with a greatly expanded provision for a rapidly increasing youth population and the financial crisis of the mid-1980s. This led the Organization for Economic Cooperation and Development (OECD) to conclude that, despite considerable reference to the ideal of lifelong learning, as in nearly all other countries, there is no evidence of any concerted efforts to render it a reality.

— Department of Education and Science (2000), "Learning for life: White paper on adult education", p.54

In 2000, the Government of Ireland Department of Education and Science published Learning for Life: White Paper on Adult Education. The White Paper encouraged lifelong learning to take account of individual personal, cultural, social and economic needs and emphasised the importance of adult education to target marginalised communities. The White Paper defined adult education as "systematic learning undertaken by adults who return to learning having concluded initial education or training" and identified six priority areas: (1) consciousness raising to promote personal and collective development, (2) citizenship to promote social responsibility, (3) cohesion to empower people are most disadvantaged in society, (4) competitiveness to develop a skilled workforce, (5) cultural development to promote adult education as way to enhance community culture, and (6) community development to develop a sense of collective purpose. The White Paper prioritised the development of community education, for example, offering part-time courses and addressing gaps in people's education for those who had low levels of formal education.

During the 2000s, the Irish Government pursued a Lifelong Learning Strategy as a result of The White Paper. Subsequent initiatives introduced were the Back to Education Initiative (BTEI) and the Adult Education Guidance Initiative (AEGI). The BTEI provides young people and adults the opportunity to study free part-time, who have not achieved the Leaving Certificate from secondary school. The AEGI provides free support around further education and training for all adults, but prioritises people not in employment. The National Framework of Qualifications (NFQ) was established in Ireland in 2003 by the National Qualifications Authority of Ireland as a way to standardise training and qualifications across all educational institutions and providers. The NFQ was used in the National Skills Strategy published in 2007, by the Expert Group on Future Skills Needs, which recommended that literacy and basic skills are integrated into the educational programme. Ireland's National Skills Strategy 2025 is the most current published by the Government of Ireland, Department of Education and Skills in which one of the objectives is that "people across Ireland will engage more in lifelong learning." To meet this need, the Strategy cites continuing to develop further education programmes including; adult literacy, BTEI, community education, community training centres and ESOL.

== Theoretical underpinnings ==
=== Theories of community ===
German sociologist Ferdinand Tonnies coined the terms 'gemeinschaft' and 'gesellschaft' in 1887 to create a distinction between community and civil society. 'Gemeinschaft' refers to smaller neighbourly, close communities, whereas 'gesellschaft' refers to larger market-driven, individualistic societies. French sociologist Emile Durkheim worried about disintegration of community because of modernity and social change, because he argued that people might loose traditional familial and social bonds as they prioritised work and economic competition. American urban sociologist, Robert E. Park also made a distinction between geographical areas and communities, Park believed that rural communities were those with greater interactions between a small group of close-knit individuals, and urban communities were less personal and more individualistic. Some community interventions are geographically targeted, for example, in Europe communities of need may be identified from databases such as the EU-SILC (European Union Statistics on Income and Living Conditions) or the Scottish Index of Multiple Deprivation in Scotland. Dave Beck and Rod Purcell have criticised this approach, based on statistics and geography, because they believe "these are artificial constructs that are labelled as communities, with the expectation that the people who live there do (or should) behave as if they were a functioning community."

==== Social Capital ====
The term 'social capital' is said to have been first used by Lyda Hanifan in his 1916 article entitled 'The rural school community centre' and later explained further in his 1920 book The Community Centre. In his 1916 article, Hanifan defines capital as "that in life which tends to make these tangible substances count for most in the daily lives of a people, namely, goodwill, fellowship, mutual sympathy and social intercourse among a group of individuals and families who make up a social unit, the rural community, whose logical center is the school." American-Canadian economist Jane Jacobs defined social capital as "people who have forged neighbourhood networks" in her 1961 critique of urban planning The Death and Life of Great American Cities. However, the term social capital is most associated with French sociologist Pierre Bourdieu during the 1980s. Bourdieu regarded social capital as something belonging to an individual from their social status and power. In Bourdieu and Wacquant's 1992 book An Invitation to Reflexive Sociology, he defines social capital as "the sum of the resources, actual or virtual, that accrue to an individual or a group by virtue of possessing a durable network of more or less institutionalized relationships of mutual acquaintance and recognition." Bourdieu linked social capital with the cultural capital, which he described as inherently built up through generations, and both social and cultural capital, alongside economic capital, contribute to inequality and deprivation. In Bourdieu's definition of social capital, there is room for inequality when people who have the most advantageous social networks get ahead of other people, in terms of their access to economic and cultural resources.

American sociologist James Coleman also considered social capital as relating to social relationships, but Coleman believed social capital to be a collective asset that benefits individuals as a group. For example, Coleman cites how a neighbourhood watch group benefits a neighbourhood as a whole because it helps to lower crime in an area, even benefiting those who are not part of the neighbourhood watch group. In 2000 American political scientist Robert Putnam published his book Bowling Alone: The Collapse and Revival of American Community in which he argues that there has been a decline of social capital in the United States since 1950. Putnam's work is credited with bringing the term social capital into popular vernacular, and he defined it as a public good. Putnam writes that social capital is "the connections among individuals' social networks and the norms of reciprocity and trustworthiness that arise from them". Putnam argues that Americans have increasingly become disengaged from community involvement and more distrustful of the government, and he uses data from the General Social Survey showing falling membership to civic organisations, and argues that this shows a decline in social capital.

Some researchers have split social capital into 3 different forms, and these include:

1. Bonding - long-lasting social bonds between individuals who share similar experiences. For example, family and friends.
2. Bridging - relationships between individuals who differ in social identity or geography but share an ethnicity, interest, or ideology, for example.
3. Linking - relationships between individuals of differing status and power. For example, users of a service or government officials.

=== Psychosocial Theories ===
Paul Hoggett and Chris Miller (2000) argue that the emotional life of individuals is often ignored in community development and encourage greater reflexivity from practitioners and communities. Reflexivity refers to the practice of examining ones own beliefs and judgements, and how this may effect their practice. Canadian-American psychologist Albert Bandura's theory of self-efficacy looks at the ways in which individual behaviour is influenced by specific situations, and Bandura defined self-efficacy as an individual's belief that they will be able to "exercise influence over events that affect their lives." Marilyn Taylor argues that if an individual has low self-efficacy, they will be less likely to engage in collective action.

Group dynamics and working together is a common component of community work (education and/or development). American psychologist Bruce Wayne Tuckman published his article 'Developmental sequence in small groups' in 1965 in which he produced a model of group development. Tuckman identified 4 stages of group development; (1) forming is when people come together and start initial discussions, (2) storming is where the group identify group positions and engage in conflict resolution, (3) norming is where the group agrees to work towards a shared goal, and (4) performing is when the group are achieving goals and able to engage in the decision-making process together. Understanding group dynamics might provide good insight into learning styles, skillset and personality traits.

=== Theories of State and Power ===
==== Gramsci and Cultural Hegemony ====
Italian Marxist philosopher Antoni Gramsci developed the theory of cultural hegemony which argued that capitalism and the ruling class used cultural institutions in society to maintain wealth and power. Gramsci believed that capitalist societies were made up of two overlapping divisions, the first being the 'political society' which rules by force and the second being the 'civil society' which rules by consent. Gramsci's 'civil society' existed in the public sphere and any community groups or political parties were only allowed to form by the ruling class, and because the public sphere is where ideas and beliefs are articulated, hegemony of the ruling class was the culture produced. Cultural institutions could include the education system, and Beck and Purcell explain hegemony writing "the complicated network of institutions and organisations found in civil society and the state work together in a way that maintains the status quo; it keeps the powerful, powerful. [...] the education system teaches people their place within society, stratifying people for particular roles and rewarding particular forms of knowledge and behaviour." Joseph A. Buttigieg argues that the role of education lies at the centre of Gramsci's concept of hegemony. Gramsci saw adult education as being a challenge against the state, and Peter Mayo argues that Gramsci saw lifelong learning as counter-hegemonic because any site, including workplaces, could be used to educate the lower classes.

==== Freire and Critical Pedagogy ====
Brazilian philosopher Paulo Freire published his book Pedagogy of the Oppressed in 1970. Freire emphasised the importance of the political context in which community development takes place, and he offered a radical approach to practice. Freire positioned society as an interplay of inequality between labour and capital, the wealthy and the poor, and the oppressed and the oppressor. The Freirean approach aimed to challenge the thinking of both practitioners and learners, and the social relationships that make up education. Freire argued that there were two types of education; (1) banking which domesticates and placates people to conform to societal expectations and (2) problem posing which empowers people to think critically and make change. This idea is also generally known as critical pedagogy.

==== Foucault and Power ====
French social theorist Michel Foucault believed there were two forms of power: empirical and theoretical. Empirical power defines power that is well-established and traces the historical articulation of power throughout society, whereas theoretical power relates to the rudimental nature of power as a universal concept. In his 1975 book Discipline and Punish: The Birth of the Prison Foucault introduced his theory of power and argued that it was the mechanisms of power that controlled individuals, for example, through technology for surveillance. Foucault believed that power operated through individuals rather imposing on them, and that for power to be sustained there needs to be "willing subjects." British social theorist Steven Lukes developed Foucault's theory to argue that community education can provide people with the ability to govern themselves outside of the state.

=== Wisconsin Model ===
A philosophical base for developing Community Education programs is provided through the five components of the Wisconsin Model of Community Education. The model provides a process framework for local school districts to implement or strengthen community education. A set of Community Education Principles was developed by Larry Horyna and Larry Decker for the National Coalition for Community Education in 1991. These include:

1. Self-determination: Local people are in the best position to identify community needs and wants. Parents, as children's first and most important teachers, have both a right and a responsibility to be involved in their children's education.
2. Self-help: People are best served when their capacity to help themselves is encouraged and enhanced. When people assume ever-increasing responsibility for their own well-being, they acquire independence rather than dependence.
3. Leadership Development: The identification, development, and use of the leadership capacities of local citizens are prerequisites for ongoing self-help and community improvement efforts.
4. Localization: Services, programs, events, and other community involvement opportunities that are brought closest to where people live have the greatest potential for a high level of public participation. Whenever possible, these activities should be decentralized to locations of easy public access.
5. Integrated Delivery of Services: Organizations and agencies that operate for the public good can use their limited resources, meet their own goals, and better serve the public by establishing close working relationships with other organizations and agencies with related purposes.
6. Maximum Use of Resources: The physical, financial, and human resources of every community should be interconnected and used to their fullest if the diverse needs and interests of the community are to be met.
7. Inclusiveness: The segregation or isolation of people by age, income, sex, race, ethnicity, religion, or other factors inhibits the full development of the community. Community programs, activities, and services, should involve the broadest possible cross section of community residents.
8. Responsiveness: Public institutions have a responsibility to develop programs and services that respond to the continually changing needs and interests of their constituents.
9. Lifelong Learning: Learning begins at our birth and continues until death. Formal and informal learning opportunities should be available to residents of all ages in a wide variety of community settings.

== Challenges ==
=== Social change ===
Language then becomes the largest disadvantage for many groups of people because they no longer have equality of access to information that is shared in the community. That is when the conversation regarding social change becomes a challenge. To call out this disadvantage and claim the inequality of access to information will call attention to mainstream media because it challenges the normalization of looking down upon people who speak a different language in conversations with a dominant language. Organisations or services that disrupt the status quo could face having their funding cut, or they can become captured by the status quo as they must meet service level outcomes, management outcomes, for example. Partnerships between community-based organizations (CBOs) and schools form projects to encourage the advancement of family involvement in their children’s education. For the students to achieve academic success, the consideration of CBO’s language inclusion has been a large factor.

Changes in learner demographics and the economy can also impact community education. For example, there is an ageing population in western societies and there may need to be changes in priorities of adult educators to address the resulting skills gap, particularly in digital skills.

=== Ethical issues ===
Some native English speakers have negative prejudice about people whose accents stand out. Their lack of ethics causes people with accents, whose native language isn't English, to be frowned upon. Judging without the ability to form a conversation. The avoidance of conversation amongst these different groups of people prevents effective conversations amongst the community, where the conversation can have insight from various backgrounds and become more developed. Thus, the lack of language inclusion and understanding when educating a community becomes a challenge. Without resources that encourage people of the community with different languages to speak and learn, the number and diversity of participation decline. Because Language participation will be permissible according to its association with social, economic, and political resources, if those resources are not provided, then it becomes a disadvantage for the community. They are then excluded from participation and inclusion, and then social hierarchies of language are created. While some languages have been considered to have high prestige because of how dominant their country’s use of the language may be, the accent is still looked down upon. Moreso, the languages that are associated with what some may label as having negative attributes because the languages are derived from third-world or minority labeled countries. Those accents and languages are looked down upon even more.

Working within the community can bring about ethical issues, for example, when considering the ends served by any intervention, the community in which an intervention is aimed at, the ways in which success will be measured, and the intended or unintended consequences. The power dynamics and role boundaries can be an issue for community workers because they may be caught between those who have power and people who want a change and more say over their social situation and community.

=== Implicit bias ===
Community educators may find they need to address any implicit bias they might hold regarding what issues a community faces and what it needs. French Marxist theorist Guy Debord was a founding member of the Situationist International in 1950s, which established the idea of psychogeography. Debord defined psychogeography as "The study of the specific effects of the geographical environment, consciously organised or not, on the emotions and behaviour of individuals." Rod Purcell argues that psychogeography is a way for community workers to not only understand a community, but also to empower people to critically think about their community.

=== Learner Engagement ===
In UNESCO's fourth Global Report on Adult Learning and Education published in 2019, that learner engagement is lower for "vulnerable and disadvantaged" communities. The report states that, in poorer rural areas, many women have no access to education and identifies "migrants and refugees, older adults, adults with disabilities, those living in rural areas, and adults with low prior educational attainment" as those facing the greatest barriers to learning.

According to Carolyn Temple Adger, CBOs are crucial for the support of language inclusion and consideration in the minority identified students in education. They can be ethnic organizations, special-purpose CBOs, and multipurpose CBOs. The ethnic organizations cater towards the culture and include the parents in terms of language and how the empowerment relates to their culture. Meanwhile, the special purpose CBOs are a single program with a direct single purpose for one type of person, like a student. Finally, the multi-purpose CBOs provide many programs involving health, employment, and social services for everyone in the family. The partnerships derive from a project that has a program that could continue to be added to. Once it is added, more partnerships can build into it and add programming, which means more funding as well. The augmentation of the programs into communities allows accessibility for consistent connection and the ability to obtain knowledge for the growth of families in the community.

=== Funding ===
Community education, particularly provision of adult learning, can face significant challenges around investment as governmental funding is limited in many countries. In the UK, spending on adult education is 25 per cent lower in 2024-25 compared to 2010-1.

== Participatory democracy ==
=== Youth participation ===
In many parts of the world, youth parliament-style organisations have been set up to allow young people to debate issues that affect them and others in their community. Young people engage with these organisations voluntarily and are sometimes elected using a democratic system of voting. Young people are at the heart of these organisations and are usually involved in the management and development. The majority of these organisations are facilitated and staffed by workers trained in community learning and development; however, staff role is mainly to facilitate and be supportive but not intrusive.

These organisations allow young people to gain a voice, influence decision makers who affect their lives and provide them with a sense of self-worth and a place in society.

In the United Kingdom, examples of these organisations include the United Kingdom Youth Parliament (UKYP); in Scotland, the Scottish Youth Parliament (SYP); in Wales the Children & Young People's Assembly for Wales; and in Northern Ireland, the Northern Ireland Youth Forum. In Canada, examples include Youth Parliament of Manitoba (YPM), Saskatchewan Youth Parliament (SYP), TUXIS Parliament of Alberta (TUXIS), and British Columbia Youth Parliament (BCYP).

=== Parental participation ===
Cultural divides and deficit thinking creates mutual distrust between marginalized parents and schools which in turn creates barriers to active parental involvement of marginalized parents in the education of their children. Researches also show that parents of high socio-economic status play active and direct role in the education of their children and are more likely to influence school policies that affects their children's schooling whereas parents of low socio-economic status play indirect roles in the education of their children and are less likely to influence school policies that affects their children's schooling. The gap between parents' educational involvement among parents from higher socio-economic status and parents from lower socio-economic status results in a more personalized education that caters for the needs of children from higher socio-economic backgrounds and more alienating and generic education systems/policies for students from low socio-economic backgrounds.

The following practices are necessary for parent and community participation in the education of their wards to be effective; students come to school healthy and ready to learn, parents assist schools with financial and or material support, there are frequent communications between parents and school authorities, parents have meaningful authorities in the schools and they also assist in the teaching of their children. Parents' home based educational involvement such as creating an enabling learning environment at home, helping their children with their assignments, helping their children develop cognitive skills and other school skills and motivating their children to do well in school supports student success. Researches show that multimodal and effective migrant parental involvement in the education of their children increases the test scores of such students and also shows strong student success even after academic abilities and socio-economic status are taken into consideration.

School officials' racial stereotypes, class stereotypes, biases and attitudes regarding parental involvement in the education of their children hinders school officials from involving parents as partners in the education of their children. Also, bureaucracies in the public education systems hinders parents from advocating for changes that would benefit their children. Formally organized parental associations in schools that seeks to increase parental involvement, ignore the cultural and socio-economic needs of minorities, thereby contributing to the barriers of parental involvement, especially for marginalized parents. Research shows that high number of marginalized parents do not actively engage in their children's schooling. There is also a wide gap between the rhetoric of best parental involvement practices and actual parental involvement practices. Effective parental Involvement in the education of their children involves; parenting, communication, volunteering, home tutoring, involvement in decision-making, and collaboration with the community. Effective Parental Involvement treats and or makes school officials and parents partners in the education of their children.

== See also ==
- Adult education
- Community development
- Lifelong learning
- Youth Bank
