= Matching =

Matching may refer to:

== Geographical names ==
- Matching, Essex, England
  - Matching Green
  - Matching Tye

== Mathematics and computer science ==
- Matching (graph theory), in graph theory, a set of edges without common vertices
- Graph matching, detection of similarity between graphs
- Matching (statistics), a technique for reducing bias when analyzing data from observational studies
- Pattern matching, in computer science, a way to recognize patterns in strings or more general sequences of tokens
- String matching algorithm, in computer science, another simpler way to recognize patterns in strings
- Stable matching theory, the study of matching markets

== Economics and finance ==
- Matching funds, funds set to be paid in equal amount to funds available from other sources
- Matching principle, an accounting method
- Matching theory (economics), the assigning of job candidates to vacancies
- Matching corresponding trades, the basic operation for clearing (finance)
- Employer matching program in the United States

== Law and society ==
- Matching law, in behaviorism and learning, the matching law suggests that an animal's response rate to a scenario will be proportionate to the amount/duration of reinforcement delivered
- National Resident Matching Program, the process of allocating medical graduates to internship programs
- Matchmaking, the process of introducing people for the purpose of marriage

== Engineering ==
- Impedance matching, in electronics, attempting to make the output impedance of a source equal to the input impedance of the load to which it is ultimately connected

== See also ==
- Match (disambiguation)
- Matched (the title Matching in Japan), a 2024 Japanese film starring Tao Tsuchiya
