= Newman's End =

Hamlet in Essex, England

Coordinates: 51.790541°N 0.19762516°E

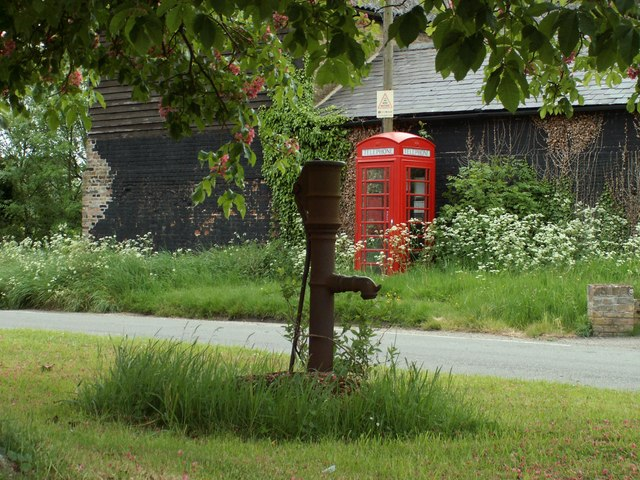
- Cast iron pump, Newman's End

- Location within Essex
- OS grid reference: TL516124
- District: Epping Forest
- Shire county: Essex
- Region: East
- Country: England
- Sovereign state: United Kingdom
- Postcode district: CM17
- Dialling code: 01279
- UK Parliament: Brentwood and Ongar

Newman's End is a hamlet in the civil parish of Matching, and the Epping Forest district of Essex, England.

The hamlet, at the north of the parish, is less than 1 mile (1.6 km) north-west from Matching village and the parish church of St Mary, and 1 mile south-east from the village of Sheering, The M11 motorway is 1 mile to the west, with Junction 7 the closest access 5 miles (8 km) to the south-west.

== History ==
At the then Smallway's Farm in the mid-1700s was a malt house, by at latest 1843 using grain from a field to the west of the farm. Parsonage Farm, still existing at the centre of the hamlet, of 63 acres (30 ha) in 1745 and 56 acres (20 ha) in 1843, was glebe land in the advowson of the trustees of Felsted School, until, in 1876, the rectory was bought by Henry Selwin-Ibbetson, 1st Baron Rookwood of Down Hall in the then Hatfield Broad Oak, now Hatfield Heath parish. At the north-east of Parsonage Farm are the remains of a possible medieval moat, now a scheduled monument.

There are four Grade II listed structures at Newman's End:

- 'Parsonage Farmhouse', a four-bay timber-framed and plastered two-storey house, with pargetting details, dating to the 17th century;
- 'Parsonage Farm barn', a timber-framed weatherboarded barn dating to the 17th century;
- 'Red Tile Cottages', a timber-framed, tiled roofed cottage dating to the 16th century, and in 1609 part of Housham Hall manor;
- 'Pump on the Green', late 19th-century cast-iron water pump

== Matching parish settlements ==
- Carter's Green
- Housham Tye
- Matching
- Matching Green
- Matching Tye
- Newman's End
