= Match (disambiguation) =

A match is a small tool for producing fire.

Match may also refer to:

== Arts and entertainment ==
=== Films ===
- Match (film), a 2014 American drama film
- The Match (1999 film), a British film
- The Match (2019 film), an Italian film
- The Match (2021 film), a Croatian-American film
- The Match (2025 film), a Korean film
- The Match (2026 film), an Argentine documentary film

=== Television ===
- The Match (TV programme), a British video game program
- The Match (TV series), a British football television series

=== Fictional characters ===
- Match (DC Comics), a clone of Superboy
- Match (Marvel Comics), a mutant in the X-Men universe
- Match, a character from the first season of Battle for Dream Island, an animated web series

=== Music ===
- The Matches, a pop-punk band from Oakland, California
- "Matches" (Sammy Kershaw song), 1998
- "Matches" (Britney Spears and Backstreet Boys song), 2020

=== Plays ===
- Match (play), a 2004 play by Stephen Belber

== Brands and enterprises ==
- Match (drink), a carbonated soft drink sold in Japan
- Match (supermarket), a supermarket chain in Belgium, France and Luxembourg
- Match Group, the owner of online dating services including Match.com
  - Match.com, an online dating service

== Periodicals ==
- Match (magazine), a British football magazine
- Paris Match, a French magazine
- The Match!, an atheist and anarchist journal

== Sports and games ==
- Match II, the best-known of several thoroughbred racehorses named Match
- The Match (golf), a series of made-for-TV golf challenge matches involving Tiger Woods, Phil Mickelson and other sports stars
- The Match Europe v USA, an athletics annual competition organised by the IAAF
- Match (dominoes), (a) to play a domino such that adjacent ends are the same value or (b) a domino competition comprising several games
- Match (chess), either a competition between two teams or a series of games between two individuals in chess
- Match TV, a Russian free-to-air TV channel

== Other uses ==
- Sam Match (1923–2010), American tennis player
- National Resident Matching Program, commonly referred to "The Match"; procedure for matching medical students with residency programs in the US
- Project MATCH, an American study of alcoholics and their treatment

== See also ==
- Match grade, a category of firearms and ammunition
- Slow match, a slow-burning cord or twine fuse
- Match! Arena, a Russian pay TV channel
- Match! Game, a Russian pay TV channel
- Matching (disambiguation)
