= Hobbs Cross =

Hobbs Cross may refer to the following places in the Epping Forest district of Essex, England:

- Hobbs Cross, Matching
- Hobbs Cross, Theydon Garnon
