= Scottish Community Education Council =

The Scottish Community Education Council (SCEC) was set up by the Government in 1982 following the Alexander Report which had recommended the establishment of a national agency to advise the Secretary of State for Scotland on all matters relating to community education; and, to promote community education. SCEC was a non departmental public body. It focussed upon three broad themes - promoting lifelong learning; confronting social change; and, releasing local dynamic and liberating resources.

SCEC's first chair was Elizabeth Carnegy, who had previously chaired a government committee into professional community education training. The council had four directors Ralph Wilson 1982–86, Dorothy Dalton 1986–90, Esther Robertson 1990-93 and Charlie McConnell 1993–2002.

SCEC provided information, publications, training and consultancy services to community education practitioners. It was later given the function of validating and endorsing professional community education training. In the nineties SCEC opened a European office in Brussels, which became the hub of a European wide network of information services - called Eurodesk. SCEC also hosted the International Association for Community Development, the main international organisation for practitioners in this field. SCEC published three professional journals, research and practice publications and a regular supplement in Scotland's largest selling paper the Daily Record, ran conferences and training to support practitioners and trainers of community educators. SCEC played a lead role in creating a UK wide training standards organisation for community learning and development. This was called PAULO, named after the Brazilian community educator Paulo Freire. After this the term community education was replaced by community learning and development to describe the sector.

Following devolution, the new Scottish government decided to split the agency up, with its core advisory and professional validation and endorsement functions being located within a new agency called Communities Scotland. The professional validation and endorsement function was extended following the Government's report Empowered to Practice and this led to the establishment of the Scottish Standards Council for Community Learning and Development.

== See also ==
- Community learning and development
- Community development
