= Pincey Brook =

River in Essex, England

Coordinates: 51°47′46″N 0°08′46″E

Pincey Brook is a watercourse in the Uttlesford and Epping Forest districts of Essex, England, and is a tributary to the River Stort.

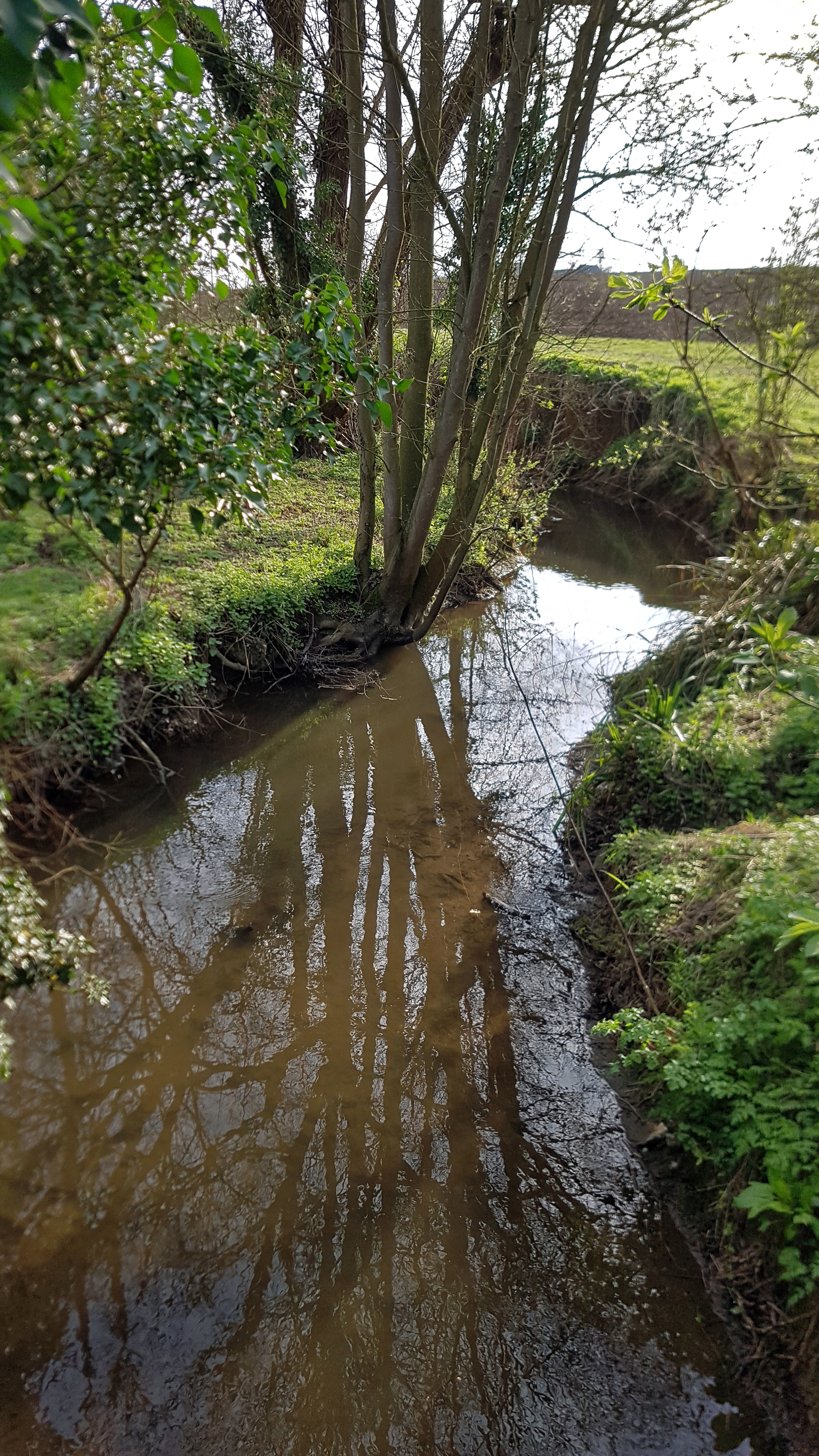
Pincey Brook at Greenhill, Hatfield Broad Oak

== Course ==
Pincey Brook rises at the south-east edge of London Stansted Airport, just north from the A120 road, and in the civil parish of Takeley. It runs south through Hatfield Broad Oak parish, passing the hamlet of Bush End, and, further south, Hatfield Broad Oak village at its western edge, afterwards turning south-west to become part of the parish boundary with Hatfield Heath. Curving further towards the west through Hatfield Heath parish, it becomes the northern boundary of the Down Hall Estate. For 700 yards (640 m) beyond the western edge of the Estate, it becomes the parish boundary between Hatfield Heath and Matching, before flowing into Sheering parish for 800 yards (730 m), after which it becomes the parish boundary between Matching and Sheering, this for 1500 yards (1,400 m), and to the M11 motorway. A culvert takes the Brook under the motorway, after which it remains in Sheering until 550 yards (500 m) from the north-east edge of Gibberd Garden. From here the Brook becomes the boundary between Sheering and the Essex town of Harlow at Elim Meadows, until it flows into the River Stort at a triangulation with Sawbridgeworth parish in Hertfordshire. The total length is approximately 13.5 miles (22 km).

== History ==
Between 1999 and 2003, during Stansted Airport expansion, evidence was found of Middle Bronze Age settlement close to Pincey Brook.

A sport mare, born 1985, was named 'Pincey Brook'.

In 2013, a study was reported in the journal Limnologica - Ecology and Management of Inland Waters, concerning the probability of the incipient invasiveness of signal crayfish within the River Stort catchment area, including Pincey Brook.
