= Downham School =

Private boarding school in Essex, England

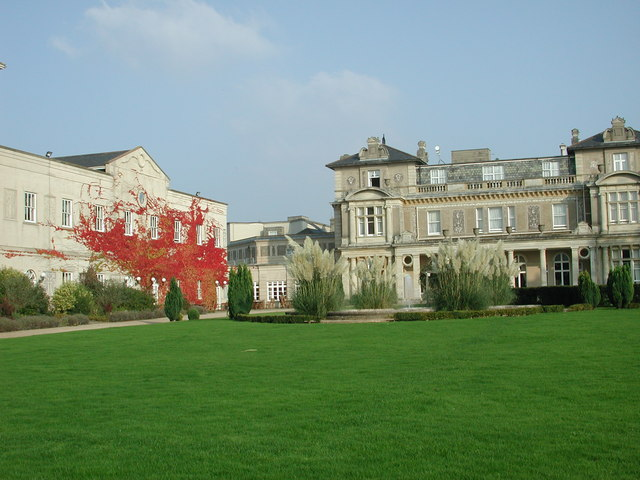
- Hatfield Heath, Essex, England

Information
- Type: Private boarding school
- Established: 1932
- Closed: c. 1967
- Gender: Girls

Downham School was a private boarding school for girls based at Down Hall, a Victorian country house near Hatfield Heath, Essex.

The school was established in 1932. Eleanor Louisa Houison-Craufurd was the first principal from 1932 to 1950. The school had a reputation for focusing less on education and more on preparing well-born young ladies for advantageous marriages. In her 2007 memoir, alumna Clarissa Eden described the school as "a fashionable boarding school ... orientated to horses". Down Hall was sold in the 1960s and the school closed circa 1967, the house becoming a conference centre.

== Notable former pupils ==
- Jennifer Forwood, 11th Baroness Arlington (born 1939), peeress
- Clarissa Eden, Countess of Avon (1920–2021), spouse of the prime minister of the United Kingdom
- Lady Caroline Blackwood (1931–1996), writer
- Lady Martha Bruce (1921–2023), prison governor
- Elizabeth Carnegy, Baroness Carnegy of Lour (1925–2010), academic and activist
- Anne Tennant, Baroness Glenconner (born 1932), peeress and socialite
- Pamela Harriman (1920–1997), Ambassador of the United States to France
- Lady Elizabeth Shakerley (1941–2020), party planner
- Frances Shand Kydd (1936–2004), mother of Diana, Princess of Wales
