= Housham Tye =

Hamlet in Essex, England

Coordinates: 51.775°N 0.1872°E

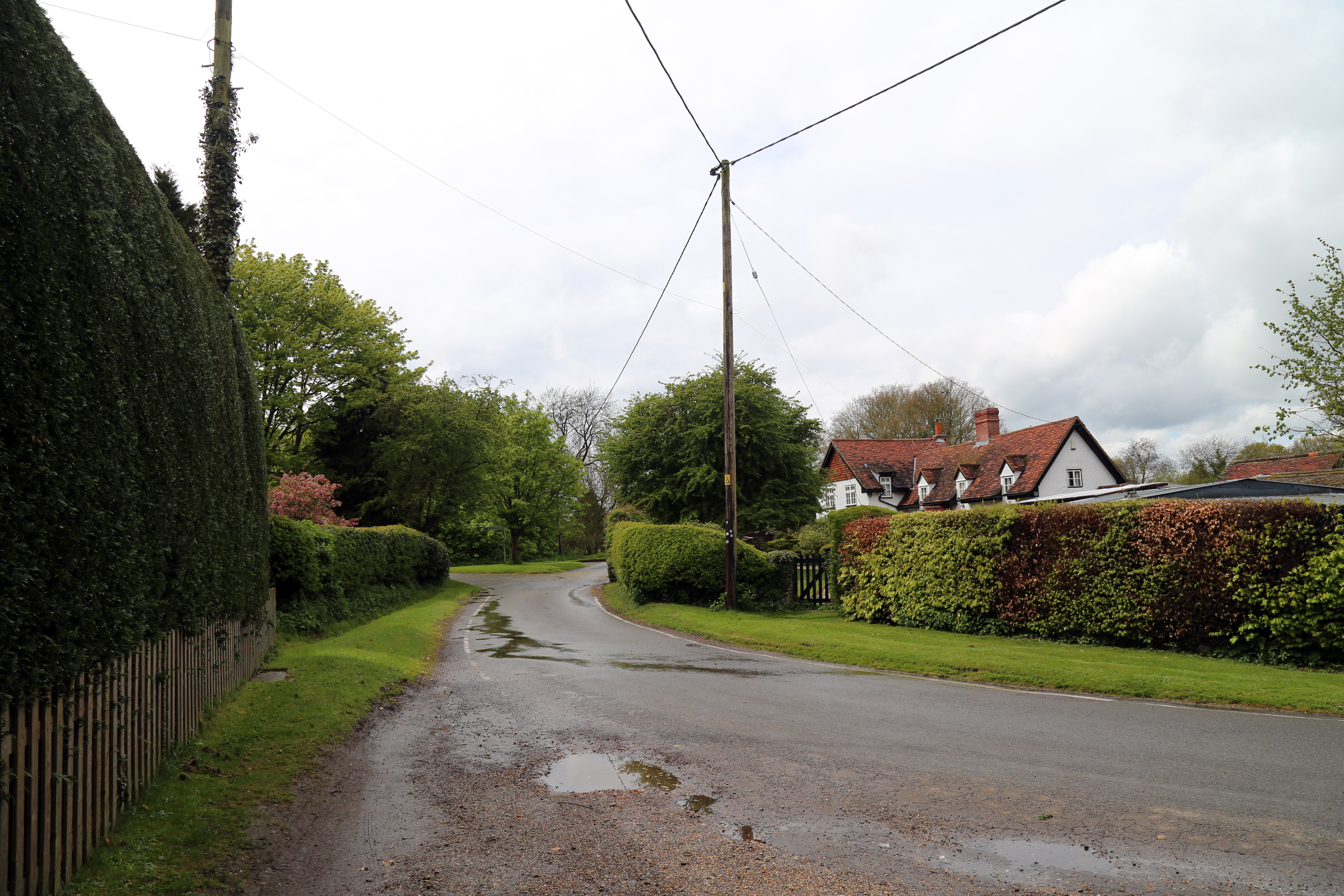
- Approaching Housham Tye and Willow Cottage from the east

- Location within Essex
- OS grid reference: TL509108
- District: Epping Forest
- Shire county: Essex
- Region: East
- Country: England
- Sovereign state: United Kingdom
- Postcode district: CM17
- Dialling code: 01279
- UK Parliament: Brentwood and Ongar

Housham Tye is a hamlet in the civil parish of Matching, and the Epping Forest district of Essex, England.

The hamlet is 1 mile (1.6 km) south-west from Matching village and the parish church of St Mary, and 650 yards (600 m) south-west from the village of Matching Tye, separated by the woodland of Matching Park. Conjoined to Housham Tye is the hamlet of Carter's Green. The M11 motorway is one mile to the west, over which is the town of Harlow. Junction 7 of the M11 is 3 miles (5 km) south-west, through which runs the A414 road to the county town of Chelmsford 15 miles (20 km) to the east.

== History ==
A Tye is an area of outlying roadside common land or green, alternatively a settlement surrounding common land or green. Housham was recorded in the Domesday Book as Ouesham. From the 17th century Housham Tye had been part of the demesne of the estate of Housham Hall – the Hall 1 mile (1.6 km) to the north and separated from its Housham Tye land. Under a 1921 purchase of the lordship of the manor, Housham Hall (today Housham Hall Farm) demesne split from the Hall, freeing land at Housham Tye.

There are seven Grade II listed buildings at Housham Tye:

- 'The Manor', at the west, a timber framed and plastered two storey house dating to the 17th century;
- 'Tadgells' (formerly 'Taggles'), at the east, a four-bay timber framed and plastered two storey hall house with four dormer windows, dating to the 15th century. A house on the site was recorded in 1327, and was named after a John Tagel. To the south of the house is the remains of a 36m x 30m rectangular moat, scheduled as an ancient monument. A raised platform within the moated area could indicate the position of the pre 15th-century house.
- 'The Homestead', a three-bay house similar to 'Tadgells', but without dormers, dating to the early 17th century, when it was recorded as single storey;
- 'Rose Cottage', converted from two cottages, and timber framed, plastered and tile-roofed, dating to the early 19th century;
- 'Pond Cottage', of three bays and timber framed, weatherboarded and thatched, dating to the 16th century.
- 'Willow Cottage', timber framed and rendered tile-roofed 'T' plan cottage, c.1800
- 'Matching Mill, at the northwest of the hamlet, the redeveloped base of a 19th-century post mill which was converted from a windmill to a smithy in 1881.

Permission has been sought and given for a 0.5 hectare lake on a residential estate in Housham Tye.

== Matching parish settlements ==
- Carter's Green
- Housham Tye
- Matching
- Matching Green
- Matching Tye
- Newman's End
