= Micheál Mac Gréil =

Jesuit priest, writer, sociologist and activist from Ireland (1931–2023)

Micheál P. Mac Gréil
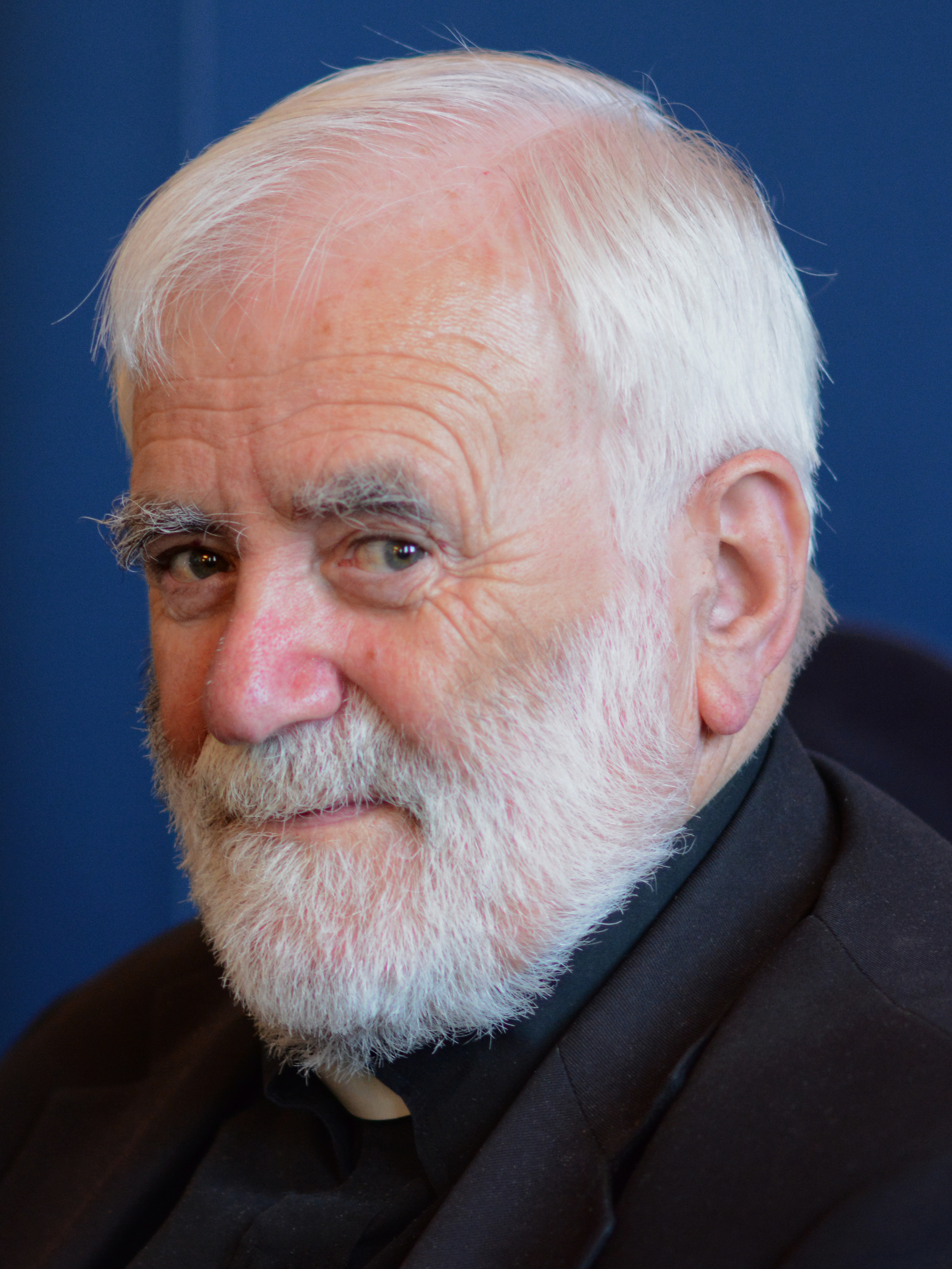
- Born: 23 March 1931; Clonaslee, County Laois, Ireland
- Died: 21 January 2023 (aged 91)

Academic background
- Education: Université catholique de Louvain, Kent State University, Milltown Park, University College Dublin

Academic work
- Discipline: Sociology
- Institutions: St. Patrick's College, Maynooth

Fr Micheál P. Mac Gréil S.J. (23 March 1931 – 21 January 2023), was a Jesuit priest, sociologist, writer and activist from Ireland.

== Biography ==
Micheál Mac Gréil was born in Clonaslee, County Laois on 23 March 1931, and grew up near Westport, County Mayo. Fr. Mac Gréil was educated by the Christian Brothers in Rice College, Westport, and served in the Irish Army from 1950 until 1959 as a cadet and officer.

Mac Gréil studied at the Université catholique de Louvain, Kent State University, Milltown Park and University College Dublin where he obtained his doctorate in sociology in 1976. In 1971, he was appointed a lecturer in Sociology at Maynooth University where he remained until he retired in 1996. He also lectured for a time at University College Dublin.

Mac Gréil was an activist and an advocate on issues such as Prison Reform, the Irish language, Irish Travellers, the decriminalisation of homosexuality and the development of the Western Rail Corridor. As part of his dedication to social justice Mac Gréil, for two consecutive Septembers in 1968 and 1969, lived on the roadside as a Traveller in disguise to learn about the social, personal and cultural mores of Irish Travellers. He also published a number of books, papers and reports on social issues and attitudes in Ireland.

In 1980, Dr. Mac Gréil revived the tradition of making a pilgrimage to Máméan. In 1981, he chaired a special working party on the Jesuit Catholic Workers College, which was to evolve into the National College of Ireland.

In 1994, Mac Gréil served as president of AONTAS, the Irish national adult learning organisation.

In 1996, he retired from his post at Maynooth University and was appointed to a parish in Westport, County Mayo.

Mac Gréil died on 21 January 2023, at the age of 91.

== Publications ==
- A psycho-socio-cultural theory of prejudice: As tested in data collected from selected samples in the Philadelphia and Cleveland metropolitan areas (1966)
- Community In The Making (1970)
- Prejudice And Tolerance In Ireland (1977) – won the Christopher Ewart-Biggs Memorial Prize
- The Sligo-Limerick Railway: a Case for Its Restoration (1981)
- Memoirs, 1911–86 James Horan (1992)
- Prejudice in Ireland Revisited with the Survey and Research Unit, St. Patrick's College, Maynooth (1996)
- Quo Vadimus. Ca Bhfuil Ar dTriall?/Where are We going? (1998)
- Report on Religious Attitudes in Ireland (2007–2008)
- The Emancipation of The Travelling People (2010)
- Pluralism and Diversity in Ireland: Prejudice and Related Issues in Early 21st Century Ireland (2012)
- The Ongoing Present: A Critical Look at the Society and World in which I Grew Up (2014) (Messenger Publications)
