= AONTAS =

Irish non-governmental organisation

- Formation: 1969
- Type: Non-Governmental
- Headquarters: Dublin
- Region served: Ireland
- CEO: Dearbháil Lawless
- Main organ: Board, Chairperson, John D'Arcy
- Affiliations: European Association for the Education of Adults, International Council for Adult Education
- Website: http://www.aontas.com

AONTAS - The Irish National Adult Learning Organisation is an Irish non-governmental organisation for the promotion and facilitation of adult learning. It was founded in 1969 by Fr. Liam Carey of the Dublin Institute of Adult Education (and originally based in the same premises), and launched by Brian Lenihan TD. Sean O'Murchu was elected its first president. In 1970 they affiliated to the European Bureay of Adult Education. In 1974 Aontas received funding from P.J. Carroll Ltd., allowing it to employ a full time director, funding a move in premises, and funding a research bursary. While it has been a non-governmental body, since 1976, it receives funding from the Department of Education and Skills.

In 1977 a group of AONTAS members set up NALA (National Adult Literacy Agency).

The word aontas (Irish pronunciation: [ˈeːn̪ˠt̪ˠəsˠ]) is Irish for "union", but is also a backronym for Aos Oideachais Náisiúnta Trí Aontú Saorálach, meaning "national adult education through voluntary unification".

Membership of AONTAS includes individuals as well as a number of state bodies such as Education and Training Boards ETBs, community education organisations, trade unions, Institutes of Technology, providers of learning, and community projects amongst others.

AONTAS produces a number of publications and periodicals such as The Adult Learners Journal as well as research publications. It is a registered charity.

Presidents of Aontas have included Sean O'Murchu (1969), Robert Kelleher(1975), Seamus O'Grady(1980), Kevin McBrien(1883), Brendan Conway(1989), Bernie Brady(1990), Mairead Wrynn (1993), Dr. Micheál MacGréil SJ(1994), John Ryan (2002), Liz Waters(2012) and Tara Farrell(2018) The current Chairperson is John D'Arcy, Open University

== See also ==
- Micheál MacGréil
