= Dublin Institute of Adult Education =

Centre of learning for adults in Dublin, Ireland

Dublin Institute of Adult Education was established by Archbishop John Charles McQuaid in 1950 as the Dublin Institute of Catholic Sociology, its first director was Rev. Dr. James Kavanagh. It hosted lectures, debates and conferences, and delivered courses and training, in various subjects such as Sociology and Adult Education. Originally based in Eccles Street, it moved to Mountjoy Square Dublin. After the Second Vatican Council, under the directorship of Fr. Liam Carey (of the Centre for Adult and Community Education at Maynooth College, who also founded AONTAS), in 1966 the institute was reconstituted into the Dublin Institute of Adult Education. In 1974 the Dublin Diocese through the Dublin Institute of Adult Education set up the Dublin Literary Scheme. UCD Professor of Sociology Mons Conor K. Ward served as chairman.

Today the institute is in No. 3. Mountjoy Square and is called the Dublin Adult Learning Centre. Appointed in 1993 its current director is Mary Maher, she also served as chairperson of NALA for 6 years (1997–2003).

== No. 3 Mountjoy Square ==
The building was built c. 1790 by Frederick Darley senior, for a Joseph Goff (flour merchant, member of the RDS, and a director and governor the Bank of Ireland). It was owned from 1909 by Alderman Walter L. Cole who became a sinn fein TD for Cavan, and a friend of Arthur Griffith, and used for meetings of the banned first Dáil in 1919. The house featured in a RTE Radio documentary presented by Joe Duffy.
