= Matching Green =

Village in Essex, England

Coordinates: 51.777°N 0.225°E

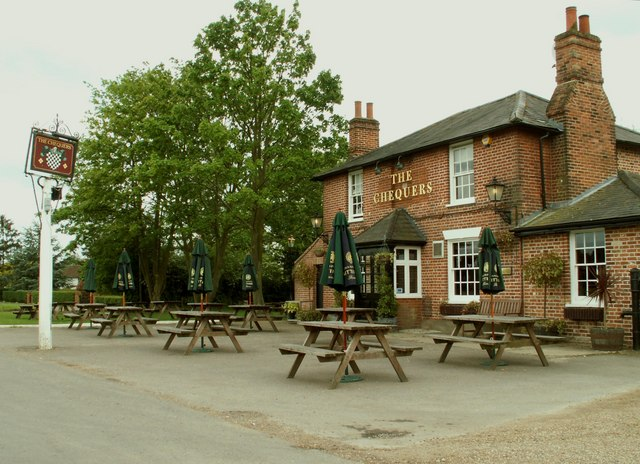
- The Chequers public house

- Location within Essex
- Population: 636
- Civil parish: Matching
- District: Epping Forest
- Shire county: Essex
- Region: East
- Country: England
- Sovereign state: United Kingdom
- Post town: HARLOW
- Postcode district: CM17
- Dialling code: 01279
- Police: Essex
- Fire: Essex
- Ambulance: East of England
- UK Parliament: Brentwood and Ongar

Matching Green is a village and the largest settlement in the civil parish of Matching, in Essex, England. It is 3.0 miles (4.8 km) east of Harlow, 4.5 miles (7.2 km) north-west of Chipping Ongar and 3.9 miles (6.3 km) south-east of Sawbridgeworth.

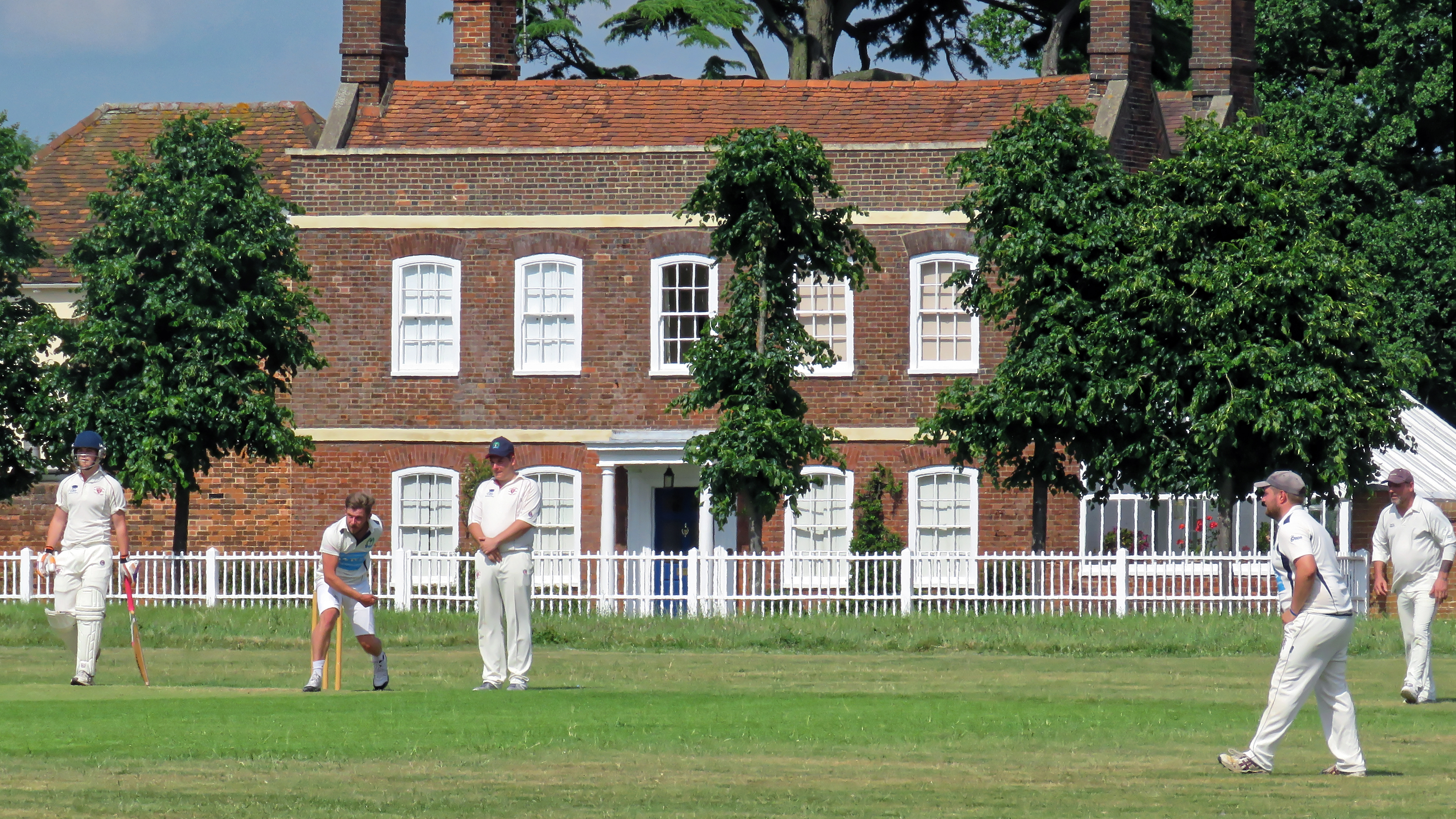
Village green cricket and 'The Limes', Grade II listed, at Matching Green

Matching Green has one of the largest village greens in Essex. The green is almost triangular in shape, covers 5.6 hectares (13.8 acres), contains the local cricket field, and is edged by mainly detached cottages and houses dating from the 14th to 19th century, twenty-eight of which are listed buildings. The village public house is The Chequers at the western edge of the green.

The site of the former RAF Matching lies to the east of village.

== Matching parish settlements ==
- Carter's Green
- Housham Tye
- Matching
- Matching Green
- Matching Tye
- Newman's End

== Transport ==
=== Bus ===
Route Number	Route	Operational Details
47	Harlow to Moreton via Matching Green	Tue-Sat (1 return journey)
147	Harlow to Ongar via Matching Green	Wed Only (1 return journey)
