= Matching, Essex =

Village in Essex, England

Coordinates: 51.784982°N 0.209478°E

Matching
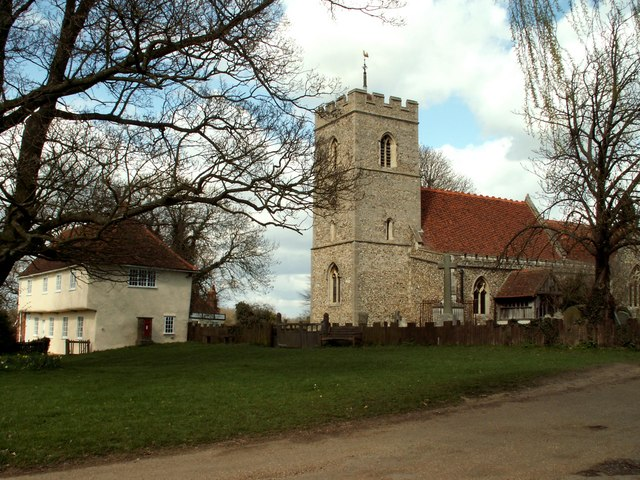
- St. Mary the Virgin Church and Wedding Feasting House

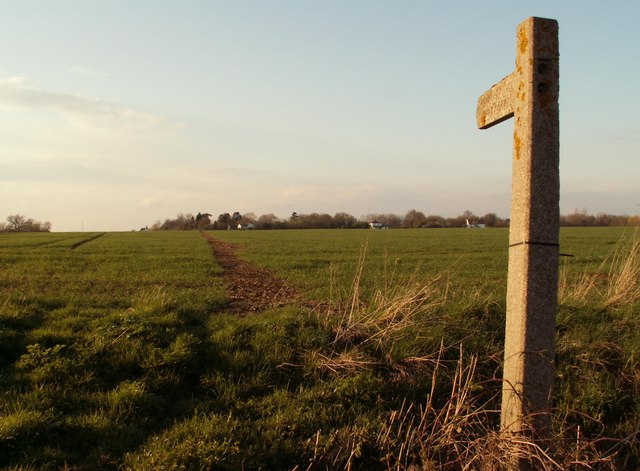
- Public footpath to Housham Tye from New Way Lane, near the parish centre

- Location within Essex
- Population: 959 (Parish, 2021)
- Civil parish: Matching
- District: Epping Forest
- Shire county: Essex
- Region: East
- Country: England
- Sovereign state: United Kingdom
- Post town: HARLOW
- Postcode district: CM17
- Dialling code: 01279
- Police: Essex
- Fire: Essex
- Ambulance: East of England
- UK Parliament: Brentwood and Ongar

Matching is a village and civil parish in the Epping Forest district of Essex, England. It lies 3 miles (5 km) east of Harlow's modern town centre and 2 miles (3 km) from Old Harlow. As well as the small village of Matching itself, the parish includes numerous other settlements, including Matching Green and Matching Tye. At the 2021 census the parish had a population of 959.

== Toponymy ==
The name Matching is Old English, meaning the place of the people of someone called Maecca (Match).

== History ==
=== Medieval Period ===
Matching appears in the Domesday Book of 1086 as Matcinga. Four manors are listed in the vill of Matching in the Domesday Book.

All its Domesday manors were fertile but small and poor – the three small manors held by the Abbey of St Valery, Geoffrey de Mandeville, and Ralph de Tony each had a single ploughteam in 1066. Matching from the mid-medieval period had four manor houses, which now stand on or near their medieval sites.

Matching Hall is one of the four and one of three Grade II* architecture buildings in the old village centre, which is dominated by the church and is a cul-de-sac also accessible by footpaths. Richard de Montfichet held the manor in 1260.

Housham Hall is timber-framed but encased in brick in the 18th century and was William de Warenne's in 1086, one of two manors in the feudal system recorded as "Ovesham" in the Domesday Book. Its more formal manor house, indicating 17th century wealth in the estate, Housham Tye, dates from the 17th century but was greatly enlarged in the 19th and the early 20th century. The Hall's free chapel had remains visible in 1720 south of the moat.

Parvills Farm, anciently "Parvilles", may have originated as a free tenement of Matching Hall manor, and was held in the 13th century by the Pereville (later Parvill) family – Agnes de Pereville gifted 50 acres (20 ha) of land in Matching to her son, Peter of Wakering. In 1341 it was held by local landlord Maurice de Berkeley. In 1624 Parvills belonged to Edward Covell. In the 1840s Parvills Farm, comprising 32 acres (13 ha) in Matching and 41 acres (17 ha) in Hatfield Broad Oak, was owned by the Reverend John Connop. In the later 19th century it was acquired as part of the Down Hall estate, in which it passed until it was sold in 1920 to the Scantlebury family, who held it until at least 1982. The old house was used as farm cottages until 1945, when it was demolished after a fire.

Stock Hall: John of Essex in 1286 leased land matching the site description to John Marsh (de Marisco): an estate of about 150 acres (61 ha) in Matching and Roding. Ralph of Hengham in 1308 leased for life, from John Stock of Black Notley and his wife Margaret, 129 acres (52 ha) in Matching and Abbess Roding, which clarifies to which Roding the earlier place name relates.

Watermans Hall is also mentioned in the church parish but its whereabouts is unknown, A deserted moated site where a manor house may have been contained is at Gunnetts Green but no evidence of building can be seen.

A guild is recorded at Matching in the twelfth year of Elizabeth I's reign.

All the owners of Down Hall, Down Hall Hotel today, which has a Grade II*-listed building and Grade II-listed parkland just north of the church in Hatfield Heath parish played a major part in the land ownership and church donations system of poor relief in Matching. Between 1803 and 1817 the annual average poor relief was £737, with peaks of £1,216 in 1813 and £1,084 in 1817. Matching became part of Epping poor law union in 1836.

The Welsh poet and clergyman, John Morgan, was curate (1713 –1728) and then vicar (1728–1733 or 1734) here, and as a result gained the nickname "John Morgan Matchin".

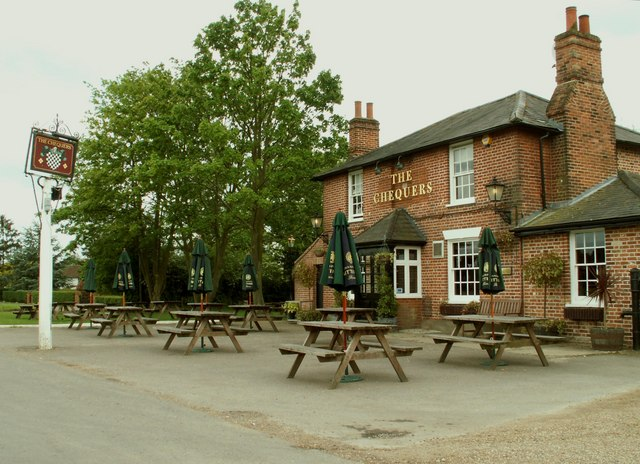
Public House facing the green at Matching Green

=== Extent of woodland/forest ===
Forest was sparse throughout; however in 1229 Thomas de Arderne, lord of Matching Hall, was given royal licence to impark Matching Wood, which seems to have caused local resentment in the 13th and 14th centuries, leading to trespass in the park, theft of timber, and attacks on the park keeper. Housham Hall manor in 1607 contained 7 acres (3 ha) of woodland. It included the Grove near Pincey Brook and known in the 19th century as "Heathenwood". Matching contained 70 acres (28 ha) of woodland in 1843 and 49 acres (20 ha) in 1977.

=== Extent of common land and woodland ===
Areas of common land and wood/waste listed in the Domesday Book are indicated by outlying roadside greens or tyes: Housham Tye, Carter's Green, and Matching Tye are in the southwest, Peartree Green and Gunnets Green in the east and Matching Green in the south-east, extending into High Laver and Little Laver. Leaze or ley specifically means common pasture Horse Leaze, Bushey Leaze, Upper and Lower Goodleys at times have taken up 48 acres of land use. In 1668 the tenants of Waterman's manor and Otes in High Laver were said "to have commoned at Matching Green time out of mind" (i.e. grazed animals and collected wild berries). The green comprised 16 acres (6.5 ha) in 1843. By then it formed part of the impropriate rectory (Note: This implies chancel repair liability is enforceable.), but the cottages retained grazing rights there until the 20th century. In 1981 the green was used mainly for recreation.

Little Leighs priory in 1274 was licensed by the Bishop of London to appropriate the rectory from its rector and upon the dissolution of the monasteries, the government granted the rectory to Sir Richard Rich, later Lord Rich, who in 1555 settled it and the advowson on his new chantry at Felsted and in 1564 they became part of the initial endowments of Felsted School. The rectorial glebe, called Parsonage farm, at Newman's End, comprised 63 acres (25 ha) in 1745.

=== Types of Agriculture ===
Matching had 116 sheep at Housham in 1397, with 6 stots, 3 oxen, a bull, and 17 cows. The small tithes of Matching were customarily paid in cheese, showing the importance of dairy farming. It was stated in 1610 that 13 farms paid nine cheeses each, one paid five, another four, while other farms paid 4 1/2 d for each hundredweight.

Livestock annual returns
Year	Type and number	Type and number	Type and number	Type and number	Type and number
1866	293 sheep	19 cows	81 other cattle	114 pigs	
1906	690 sheep	40 cows	115 other cattle	55 pigs	96 horses
1926	107 other cattle	51 cows	1357 poultry	56 pigs	53 horses
1977	238 sheep	545 cattle	33360 poultry	1346 pigs	

=== Milling ===
A mill was at Matching Hall by 1350. Windmill field in 1624 lay south of the lane leading to Matching Hall. In 1843 there were two windmills in the parish. One, belonging to John Selwin, lay about 1/4 mile east of his mansion of Down Hall. Matching mill lay about 700 yds south of Housham Hall. The Down Hall mill had gone by 1874. This closely matches the rise of industrial breadmaking in the country. Matching Mill, a post mill, continued to trade until the 1870s.

=== Industrial Revolution and Brickmaking Industry ===
An attempt in 1633 to establish saltpetre works at Matching Green was defeated by local opposition. A belt of land southeast from Down Hall has been exploited for brickmaking. In 1843 Brick Kiln mead and further Brick Kiln field lay near Down Hall. Farther south were Brick Kiln field, and Brick House Farm. In 1897 brickworks were in the field immediately west of Brick Kiln mead probably supplied with gas by the Down Hall gasworks, which stood in the adjoining field. There were maltings in the mid 18th century at Smallways Farm, Newman's End. Malthouse field in 1843 lay west of the farm. Maltings at Matching Green operated from 1845 or earlier and stood north of Albion House, and in 1902 occupied half an acre. Potash making is indicated by the field names Potash Mead and Potash Pasture, recorded in 1843 north of the lane leading to Brick House. Potash Road runs east from Matching Green.

=== Education ===
Matching county primary school originated about 1824 as a church Sunday school, held in the Marriage Feast room. A church day school opened in 1832. It was open to children from Matching, High Laver, and Little Laver. In 1839 there were 97 on the roll. The school was kept "by a governess on her own account" under the vicar's superintendence. In 1848 the governess was Hannah Hasler, the wife of a shoemaker at Matching Tye. A later schoolmistress in 1870 lived at the school.

In 1875 Sir Henry Selwin-Ibbetson, later Lord Rookwood, owner of Down Hall, who already supported an infant school at Newman's End, built a new school with a teacher's house about 500 metres north of Matching Tye, on the road to Sheering. Annual government grants were received from 1878. The church school building remained the property of Lord Rookwood and his home's successor, Major Calverley, until 1929, when the county council bought it and took over the school. Under their authority the school was reorganised in 1947 for juniors and infants. It closed in 1969.

From 1836 Matching children could attend Fawbert and Barnard's School, Harlow. Matching benefits from the Tom Parkin educational charity, founded in 1977.

== Landmarks ==
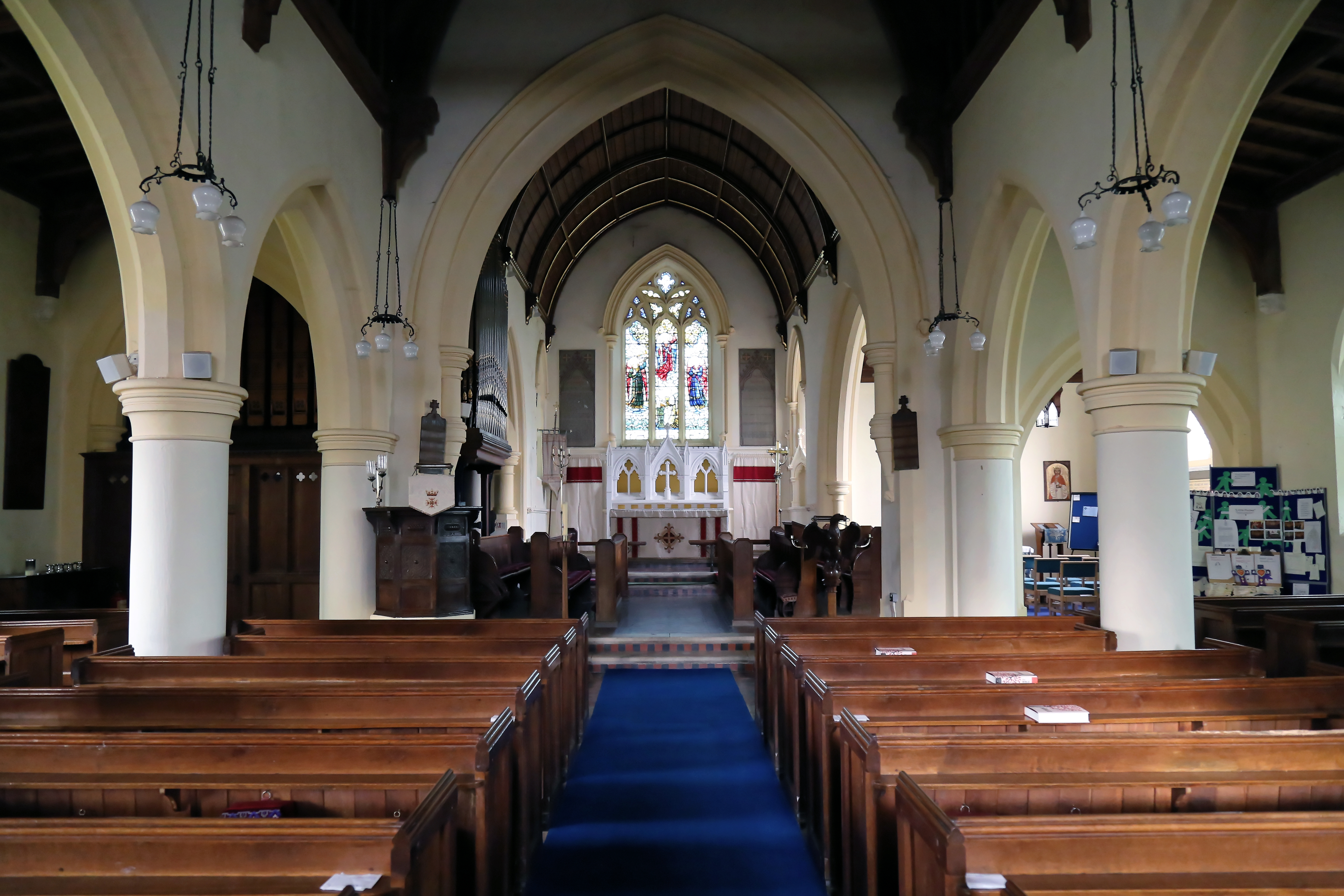
St Mary's Church nave looking towards chancel

=== St Mary's Church ===
The Church of St Mary the Virgin is Grade II* listed architecturally – there is no mention of it in the Domesday Book of 1086, but the Norman church was probably built on an old Saxon site. The tower was added in the 15th century. It is plain, square and embattled and surmounted by a low tiled spire and weather clock. It retains its original 13th-century doorway.

Six bells are in the tower, restored in 1990. It is inscribed "God Save the Queen". The second and third bells were originally cast about 1500 by William Culverden of Houndsditch, and inscribed "Sancte Thoma ora pro nobis" and "Sancta Anna ora pro nobis"; the fourth is inscribed "God Save the King. 1615" and the fifth "God Save the King. 1640" They were both made by Robert Oldfield of Hertford. A sixth bell was added in 1887 to celebrate the Jubilee of Queen Victoria.

The clock on the church tower was removed from the old church at Epping when the church was pulled down, and set up in Matching in memory of Henry Selwin-Ibbetson, 1st Baron Rookwood of Down Hall.

On the south wall the first window commemorates the restoration of the church by Lord and Lady Rookwood. The other stained window on the south wall is dedicated by parishioners and friends to the memory of Lord Rookwood who died on 15 January 1902. The east window, which commemorates Edan, Lady Rookwood, is by Powell of Whitefriars.

St Mary's organ is a rare Bevington with pipe work over the console. A brass plaque commemorates the erection of the organ by Mrs Calverley of Down Hall in memory of her brother, Sir Frederick Henniker, of the 60th Rifles, who died on 19 August 1908.

=== Airfield ===
A World War II airfield, RAF Matching, was located nearby in Matching Green. A memorial plaque remembers American airmen who lost their lives in World War II when stationed at RAF Matching. They came from the 391st Bombardment Group of the U.S. Ninth Air Force.

=== Marriage Feasting Hall ===
A notice displayed at the entrance states that the hall was built by William Chimney in 1480. This detached two-storey building, close to the church, is the other Grade II* listed building in the parish and is a timber framed Tudor building with 19th and 20th century extensions, plastered, roofed with handmade red clay tiles; an inside wall has a Victorian chimney stack. Two plain boarded doors form the entrance, on which side windows have horizontally sliding sashes of 16 panes, four on both floors, and one 20th-century casement window on the first floor. Facing the church are two small 20th-century casement windows, whereas the first floor has four 19th century neo-Gothic cast-iron casement windows. Some framing remains exposed internally. On the ground floor, at the north-west end a stairway rises from one external door to the first floor. At the SE end an original studded partition separates one bay from the remainder – the main section is open.

Inside are visible the transverse and axial beams, plain chamfered except in the service end with joists lathed and plastered to soffits. There are grooves for sliding shutters. The first floor is open from end to end and to collars. Posts are jowled with cambered tie-beams with arched braces. Plain crownposts have axial braces, much restored. Upstairs are two large rooms. The Hall has been used as a school and an almshouse, with inserted partitions and chimneys; most of these have been removed. Morant wrote in 1768: "A house, close to the church yard, said to be built by one Chimney, was designed for the entertainment of poor people on their wedding day". It seems to be very ancient, but ruinous", without supplying a Christian name or date. That its jutting façade faces away from the church tends to confirm this secular intention, for buildings of similar form designed as the meeting places of religious guilds would have a jutting midsection facing towards the church.

=== Moat House, Matching Green ===
This timber framed early Tudor period building clad with red brick Flemish bond later brickwork to the lower floor and plaster to the upper floor is in Matching Green; it enjoys the same architectural status as the above listed buildings.

== Geography ==
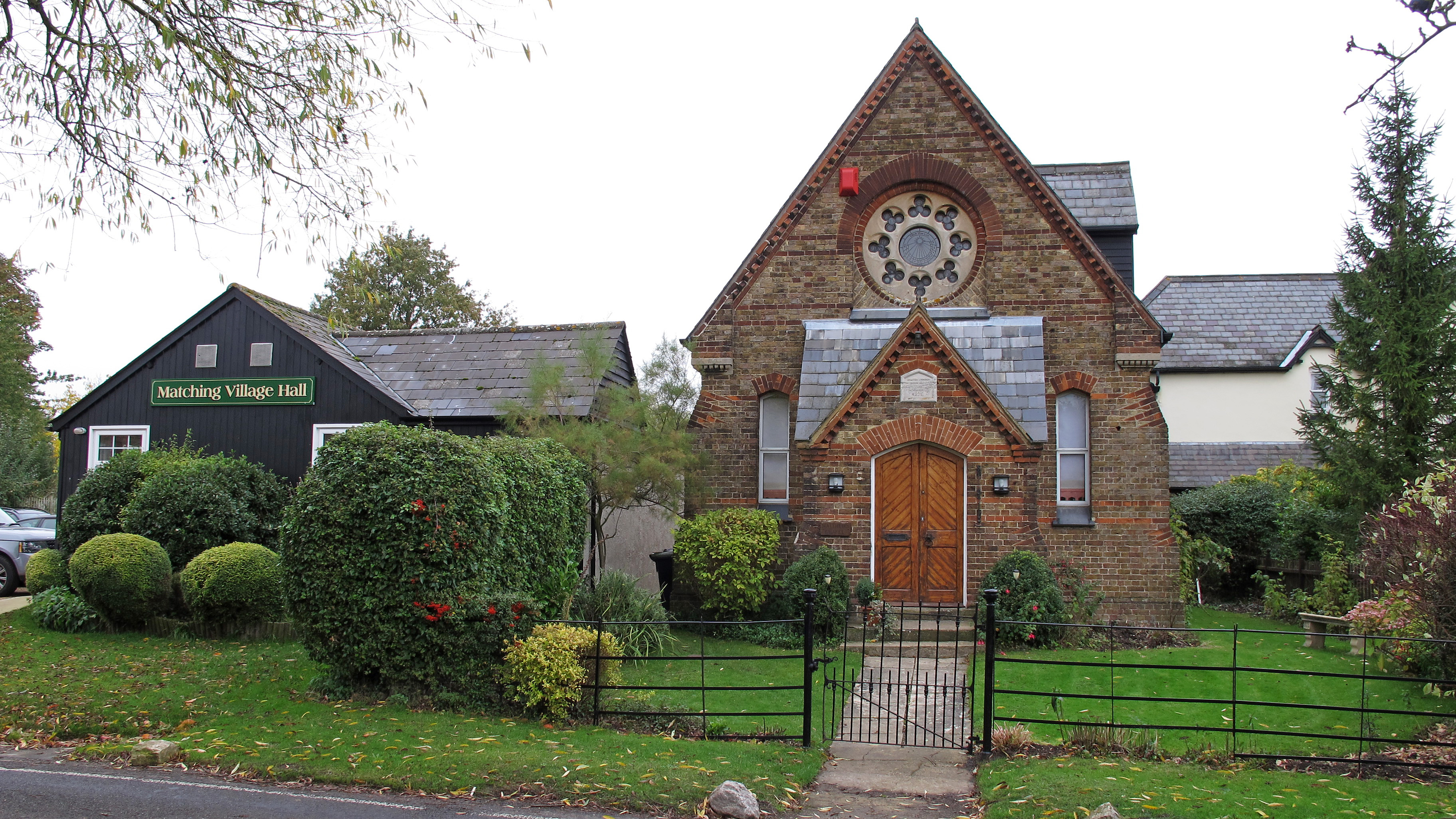
Matching Village Hall and Matching Tye Chapel

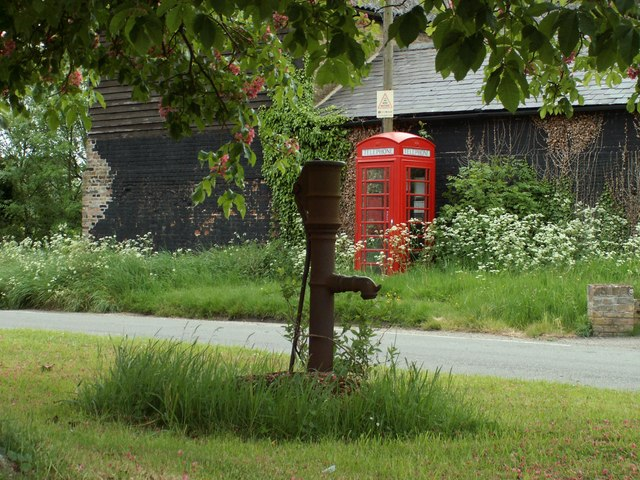
Phone booth and disused village pump at Newman's End

The village of Matching is on undulating land separated from the Stort valley by the parishes of Harlow and Sheering. 30 buildings are architecturally listed, all historic and dating to before the late 19th century. Elevations range between 90 m above sea level (Note: Maximum elevation: at Harlow Tye and at Threshers (farm)) and 49 m at Pincey Brook, the northern boundary with Sheering, which is a tributary of the Stort from Hatfield Broad Oak. Matching is 22 miles (35 km) north-east of where London is measured from, Charing Cross.

Given the number of old buildings, three conservation areas shape the ongoing character and maintenance requirements of the three biggest settlements.

=== Matching parish settlements ===
Villages and hamlets, with historic farms, roads, manors and in one case a green leading to named small neighbourhoods:

- Carter's Green, hamlet adjoining Housham Tye
- Harlow Tye, hamlet at the southwest of the parish
- Hobbs Cross, hamlet at the west of the parish
- Housham Tye, hamlet to the south of Matching Tye
- Matching (old village centre)
- Matching Green, in the southeast and larger than the old village centre
- Matching Tye, in the southwest and larger than the old village centre
- Newman's End, hamlet at the north of the parish

== Notes and references ==
Notes

== See also ==
The Hundred Parishes
