= Matching Tye =

Village in Essex, England

Coordinates: 51.778979°N 0.204234°E

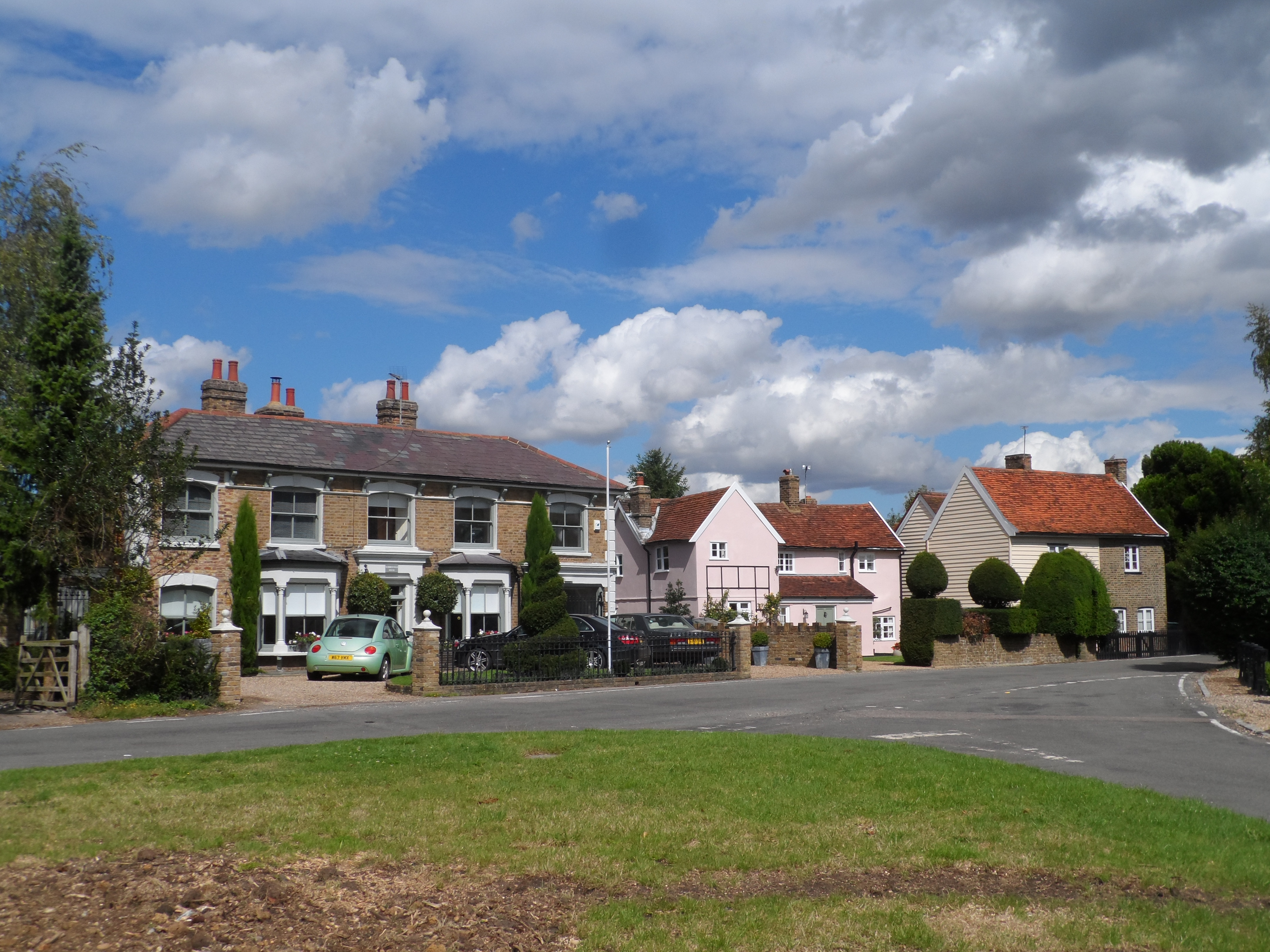

- Location within Essex
- Population: 635 (2001)
- Civil parish: Matching
- District: Epping Forest
- Shire county: Essex
- Region: East
- Country: England
- Sovereign state: United Kingdom
- Post town: HARLOW
- Postcode district: CM17
- Dialling code: 01279
- Police: Essex
- Fire: Essex
- Ambulance: East of England
- UK Parliament: Brentwood and Ongar

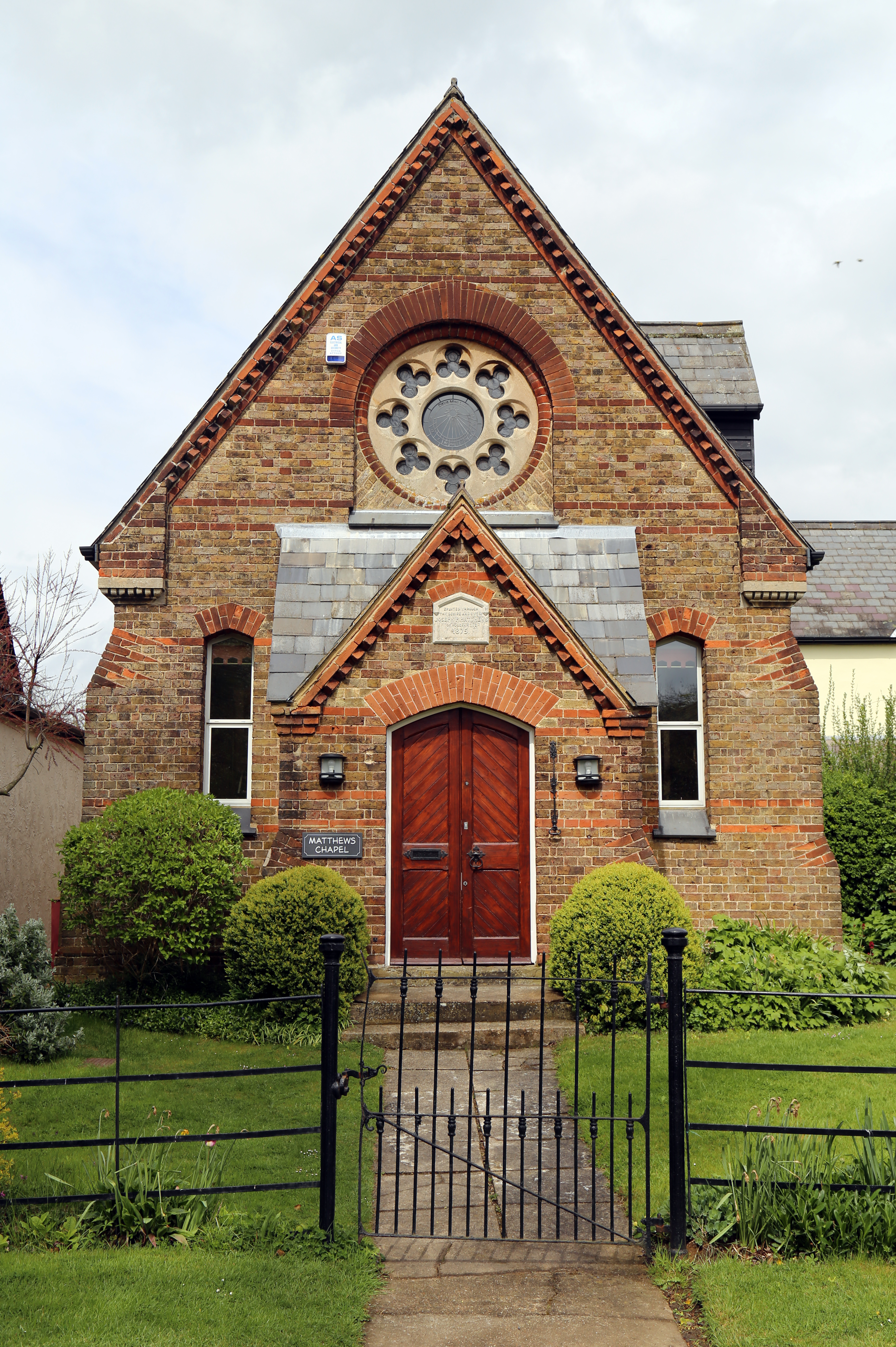
'Matthews Chapel' a former Congregational chapel of 1875

Matching Tye is a village which forms part of the civil parish of Matching, in the County of Essex, England. It is 2.3 miles (3.7 km) east of Harlow, 2.9 Miles (4.8 km) south-east of Sawbridgeworth and 6.3 miles (10.4 km) north-east of Epping.

== Other Matching parish settlements ==
- Carter's Green
- Housham Tye
- Matching
- Matching Green
- Newman's End

== Transport ==
There is no railway station in the village, the nearest active rail link is Harlow Mill, 4.2 miles from the village centre.
