= Match (drink) =

Japanese soft drink

A Match can

Match (マッチ, Macchi) is a carbonated Japanese soft drink. Match is sold in 270ml (In a plastic bottle), 350ml (Can), 480ml (Can), and 500ml (in a plastic bottle), and 1.5L (in a plastic bottle).

It is described as having a moderate sweetness and a refreshing aftertaste, and is slightly carbonated, so you can drink it even when you are thirsty. On the website the description of it reads "Match, Refresh with vitamins, minerals and fine carbonic acid!" They have recently released a "in jelly" version of their lychee version.

== In pop culture ==
A song by the Okinawan group Orange Range was used for a commercial.

The artist Hisashi Eguchi (江口 寿史, Eguchi Hisashi) created an advert for both variants of the drink, including the lychee and original flavours.
