= Liam Carey =

Irish Roman Catholic priest, sociologist and educator

Liam Carey was an Irish Roman Catholic priest and educator. He was the son of William and Mary Josephine Carey. Carey was appointed to the Dublin Institute of Catholic Sociology (DICS) as director in 1963, he went for further study Adult Education to the Teachers College, Columbia University, New York, and returned to Ireland in 1966 renamed it the Dublin Institute of Adult Education. In 1969 he founded AONTAS, the National Association for the promotion of Adult Education. In 1974 he became the first director of the Adult education department in Holy Ghost College, (Kimmage Manor), which evolved into the Kimmage Development Studies Centre. In 1974 he was awarded a PhD from the University of Manchester, for his thesis on adult education in ireland since Vatican II. In 1975 Carey became the first staff member of the new Centre for Adult and Community Education at St. Patrick's College, Maynooth, which he served until 1993 when he retired. In 1979 he wrote the Aontas Review of Adult Education in Ireland.

Following his retirement from Maynooth he served in Ballyroan Parish as a curate. Carey bequeathed over 2000 books to Maynooth University Library. He died in on February 4, 2005, and is buried in Deans Grange Cemetery.
