= Elizabeth Carnegy, Baroness Carnegy of Lour =

British peer (1925–2010)

The Right Honourable The Baroness Carnegy of Lour DL FRSA
- Carnegy in Parliament, 2009

Member of the House of Lords
- Lord Temporal
- Life peerage 14 July 1982 – 9 November 2010

Personal details
- Born: 28 April 1925
- Died: 9 November 2010 (aged 85)

Elizabeth Patricia Carnegy of Lour, Baroness Carnegy of Lour (28 April 1925 – 9 November 2010) was a Scottish academic and activist.

The daughter of Lieutenant-Colonel Ughtred Elliott Carnegy of Lour, and his wife, Violet, Elizabeth Carnegy was educated at Downham School in Essex. She worked in the Cavendish Laboratory in Cambridge from 1943 to 1946 and was president for Scotland of the Girl Guides Association from 1979 to 1989. She was a member of the Council and Finance Committee of Open University from 1984 to 1996. She was a member of the court of the St Andrews University from 1991 to 1996. Beginning in 1989, she was an honorary member of the Scottish Library Association.

Carnegy was chair of the Working Party on Professional Training in Community Education Scotland (1975–77), Commissioner at Manpower Services Commission (1979–1982), and a member of the Scottish Council for Tertiary Education (1979–1984). From 1980 to 1983, she was chairman of the Manpower Services Commission Committee for Scotland. From 1980 to 1983, she was a member of the Scottish Economic Council. In 1981, she became chair of the Scottish Council for Community Education, and in 1984 became a member of the administration council of the Royal Jubilee Trust, holding both posts until 1988.

The intention to confer a peerage for life was signified in the 1982 Birthday Honours, and on 14 July 1982, she was made a life peer with the title Baroness Carnegy of Lour, of Lour in the District of Angus and in 1993, an Honorary Fellow of the Scottish Community Education Council. Carnegy was a Fellow of the Royal Society of Arts (FRSA) and a Deputy Lieutenant for Angus from 1988 until her death. She was awarded an Hon. LLD from the University of Dundee in 1991, and from St Andrews University in 1997 as well as Doctor of the Open University in 1998. Between 1969 and 1984, she was Honorary Sheriff of Angus.

Coat of arms of Elizabeth Carnegy, Baroness Carnegy of Lour
Escutcheon Or an Eagle displayed Azure beaked and membered Sable within a Bordure Gules Supporters Dexter: A Leopard proper having a Collar charged with three Torteaux; Sinister: A Greyhound proper having a Collar Gules charged with three Escallops Argent Motto Tache sans tache (Spot without spot)

== Sources ==
- "DodOnline". Archived from the original on 6 April 2007.
