= Hatfield Heath =

Village in Essex, England

Coordinates: 51.812737°N 0.208804°E

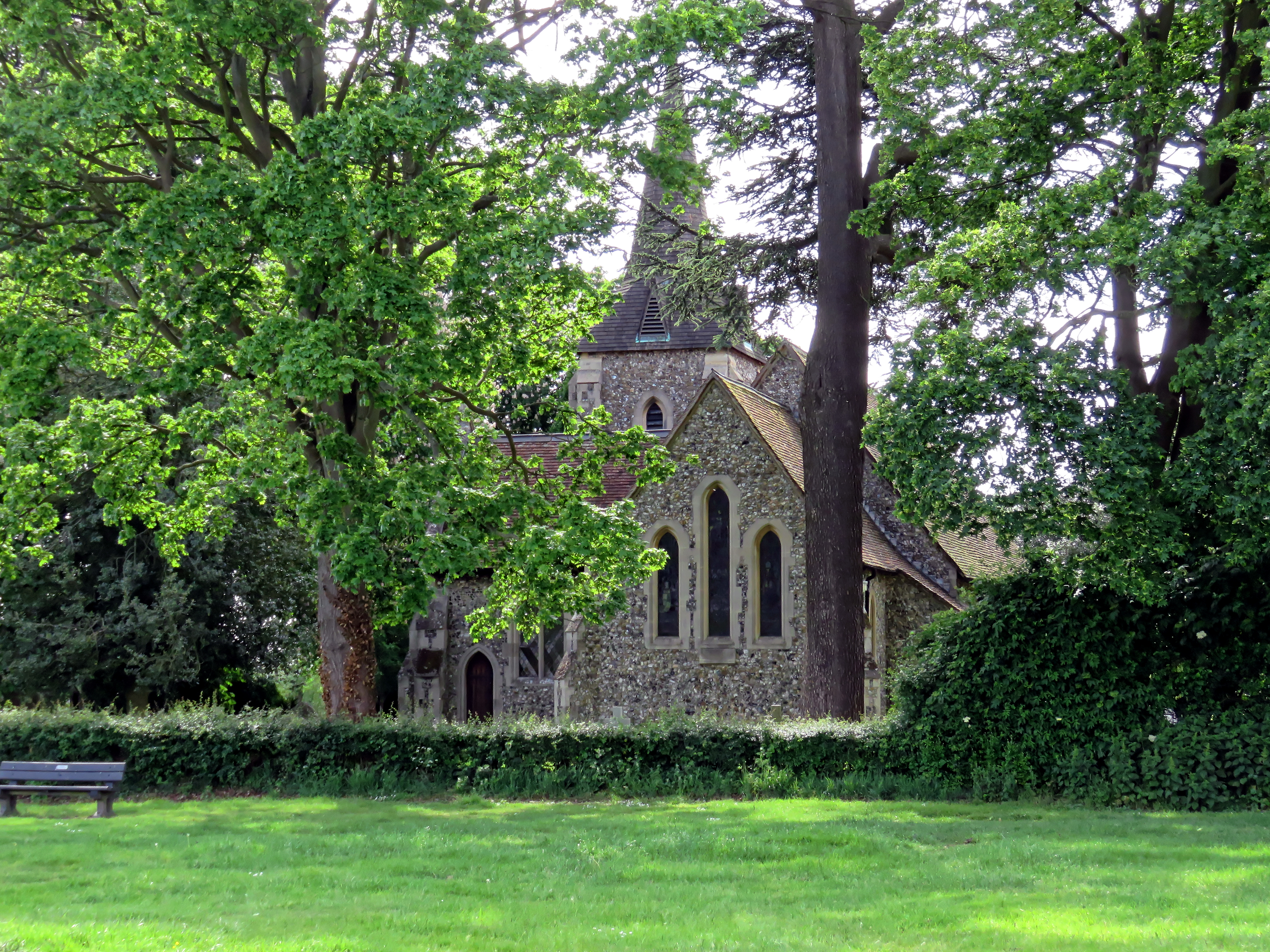
- Holy Trinity Church, Hatfield Heath

- Location within Essex
- Population: 1,998 (Parish, 2021)
- OS grid reference: TL523149
- District: Uttlesford
- Shire county: Essex
- Region: East
- Country: England
- Sovereign state: United Kingdom
- Post town: Bishop's Stortford
- Postcode district: CM22
- Dialling code: 01279
- Police: Essex
- Fire: Essex
- Ambulance: East of England

Hatfield Heath is a village and civil parish in the Uttlesford district of Essex, England. It adjoins the border with Hertfordshire to the west. In close proximity are the towns of Bishop's Stortford and Sawbridgeworth. Stansted Airport is approximately 5 miles (8 km) to the north. At the 2021 census the parish had a population of 1,998.

== History ==
The neighbouring Hatfield Broad Oak was a market town which shrank to a large village. As it declined Hatfield Heath, then in the parish of Hatfield Broad Oak, grew because of its proximity to main roads through the parish. In 1660 the fair at Hatfield Broad Oak was moved to Hatfield Heath. By the third quarter of the 18th century, the heath (today's village green), had cottages around its edge, and by the 19th century two schools, a church and a brewery.

The 1870-72 Imperial Gazetteer of England and Wales entry for Hatfield Heath describes:

...a chapelry in Hatfield-Broad Oak parish, Essex; 1¾ mile SW of Hatfield-broad-Oak, and 2½ E of Sawbridgeworth r. station. It was constituted in 1860; and its post town is Hatfield-Broad-Oak, under Harlow. Pop., 622. Houses, 124. The manor belongs to George A. Lowndes, Esq. The living is a p. curacy in the diocese of Rochester. Value, £75.* Patron, the Vicar of Hatfield-Broad-Oak. The church was built in 1860; is in the early English style; and consists of nave and chancel, with tower and spire. There is an Independent chapel.

Hatfield Heath became after 1860 an ecclesiastical district formed out of but remaining part of Hatfield Broad Oak. The settlement was a hamlet, and one of two ecclesiastical chapelries of Hatfield Broad Oak, the other being Bush End. By 1901 Hatfield Heath, remaining an Hatfield Broad Oak ecclesiastical district and hamlet, had a population of 579. At the time both Hatfield Heath and Bush End were perpetual curacies together of a yearly value of £75, held under advowson of the vicar of Hatfield Broad Oak. The church supported three National Schools in the wider Hatfield Broad Oak parish, which also contained "several" private schools. The National School at Hatfield Heath was built in 1899 for 201 mixed children, which in 1902 had an average attendance of 66. An 1894 will of George Cheveley provided interest from a trust for Hatfield Heath National School children's education, and in 1905, the Cheveley Educational Foundation. An 1857-built day school in Hatfield Broad Oak provided non-religious teaching to 113 parish pupils; it became government funded in 1862, and in 1898, after rising and falling numbers, an infants room was added, and in 1929 it was amalgamated with Hatfield Heath National School.

The Hatfield Heath Congregational community dates to 1665, established by an incumbent ejected from the vicarage of Hatfield Broad Oak who became licensed as a Congregational minister. The community met in a meeting house, and by 1724 in a barn, where the congregation numbered 300. A further house was acquired on which land the present enlarged church was built in 1875, building on a number of earlier church structures. By 1851 the congregation was 500, and became part of the United Reformed Church in 1972, after which membership fell to 91 in 1980. The Hatfield Broad Oak Congregational church building, dating from 1818 and later converted for Roman Catholic use, was until the 1920s a station of Hatfield Heath Congregational church. Kelly's Directory noted in 1902 at Hatfield Heath a Gothic style independent Congregational "chapel" seating 300, built in 1876. The church's front gable contained a stained glass window to Rev. C. Berry, who was the minister for over 50 years. The first British School associated with the Congregational community dated to 1827, with 18 pupils attending by 1833. By the end of the decade it was reduced to a Sunday school. A second British School was built concurrently with the present church; it housed places for 150 mixed children, and by 1902 had an average attendance of about 70.

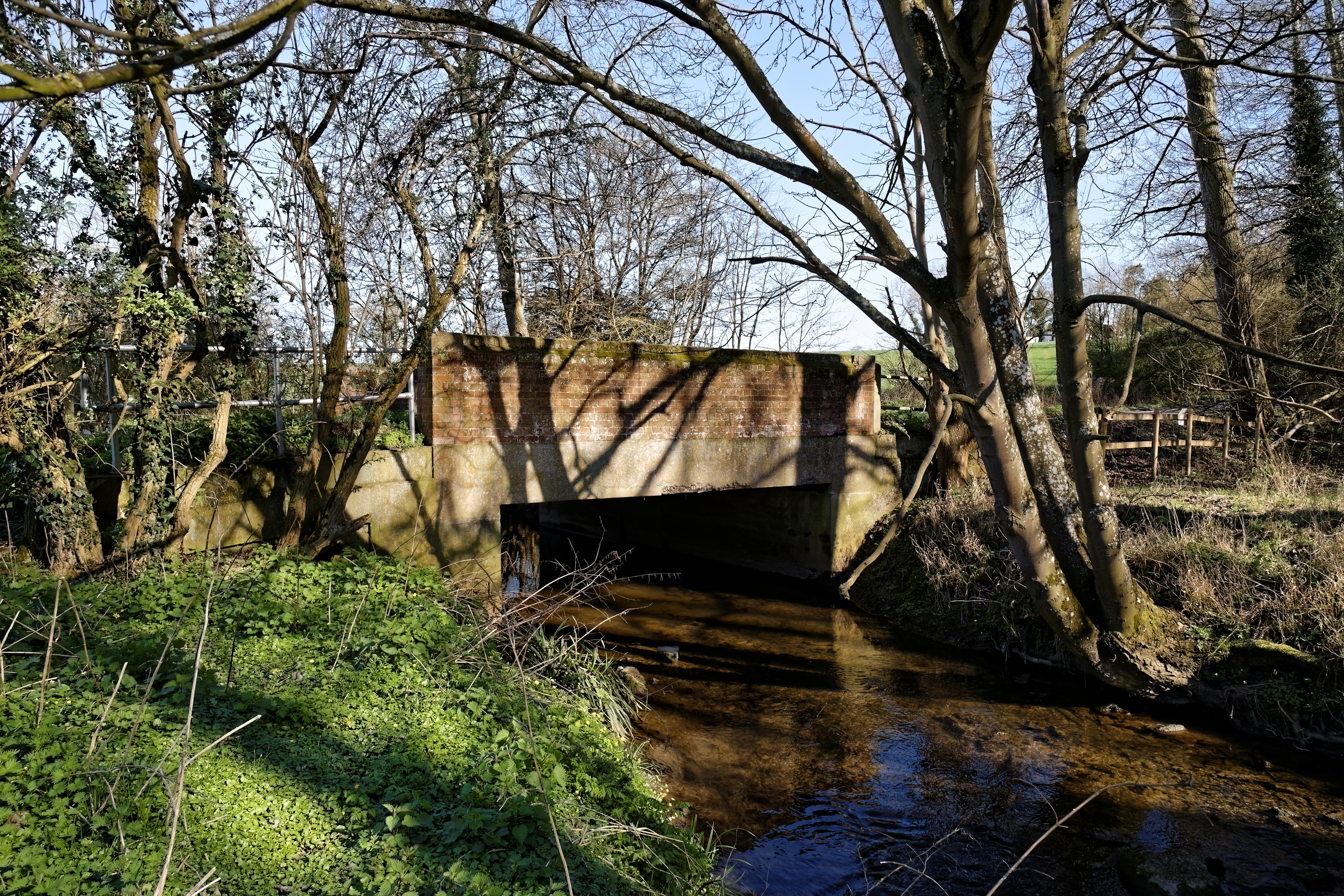
'Doune Bridge' over Pincey Brook

An original bridge over Pincey Brook on the road to Matching south from Hatfield Heath dates to before the late 13th century. The upkeep of the bridge (formerly Doune Bridge) was the responsibility of Hatfield Priory, and after the Dissolution of the Monasteries, Down (Doune) Hall manor and later manorial lords. By the middle of the 17th-century these later responsibilities were not always maintained. The bridge came under the auspices of the county in 1881. On the Chelmsford Road to the east of the village is Stone Bridge over the Pincey Brook. This bridge was the responsibility of two local farmers until 1779, after which in 1800 it was maintained by the county, but was dilapidated by 1858.

A significant estate at Hatfield Heath is 'Gladwyns' (today on Sheering Road (B183) at the southwest of the village); it was named as such in the early 14th century during the reign of King Edward II. The early 19th-century house on the estate, within grounds of 3 acres, was in 1902 occupied by Horace Broke J.P. (1827-1909), and was Grade II listed in 1981. The Lincoln's Inn barrister Horace Broke was secretary to Lord Justice Mellish.

The 17th-century timber-framed White Horse inn is at the north of the village green, as is the 18th-century brick-built Stag (Bald Stag), recorded as such in 1769, which was probably the earlier Horseshoe. Other inns ceasing trade in the 18th-century are The Bell, and The White Hart (or The Shrubs).

Over the last hundred-and-fifty years businesses established include machinists, a stonemason, and a harness maker. Later firms include civil engineers, a slaughterhouse, and a sausage maker.

Camp 116, a Second World War prisoner-of-war camp on Mill Lane, was built in 1941. It closed in 1955 but a 2003 English Heritage survey rated the camp as near complete. In 2018 a proposal by a construction company to redevelop the decaying site for housing was presented to Uttlesford District Council. A local petition was raised to save and restore the camp as a historical amenity and an application was made "to earmark the site as a historical asset".

The parish was formed on 1 April 1987 from parts of Hatfield Broad Oak and Little Hallingbury.

== Culture and community ==
Hatfield Heath village businesses, chiefly centred at the north of the village green along the A1060, include Thai and Indian restaurants, a kebab shop, fish and chip shop, two public houses, a tearoom, a bakery, a stationers and print shop, a dog parlour, GP surgery, two churches, a village hall, a primary school, two hotels, a seafood bar, a grocery store and multiple hairdressers.

The Anglican parish church, Hatfield Heath Parish Church of England, in the centre of the village, is dedicated to The Holy Trinity, and is in the Diocese of Chelmsford. Built in 1859, an 1883 restoration of the church added a south aisle.

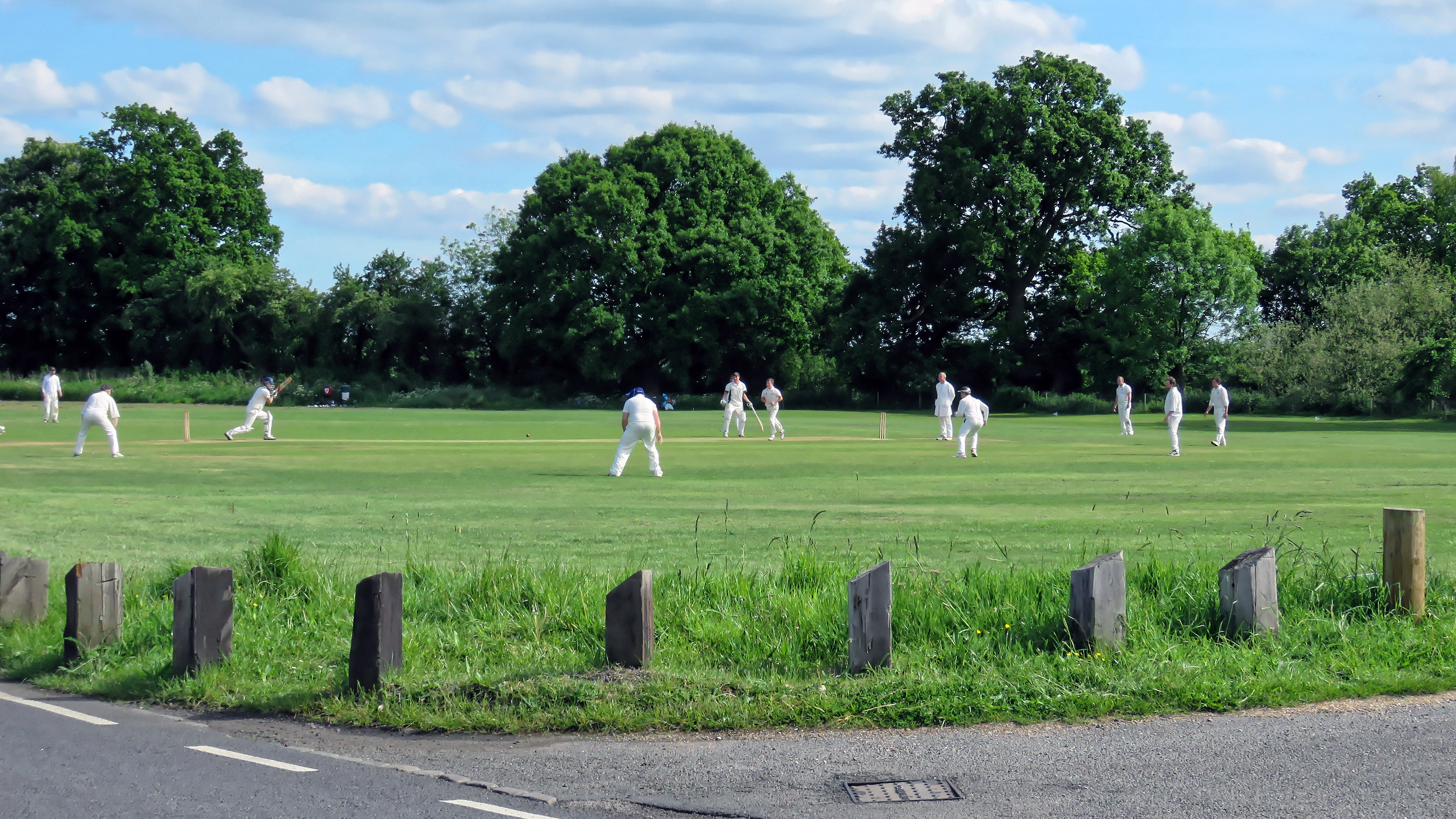
Hatfield Heath village green cricket match

Every summer the Hatfield Heath Festival (or Hatfest) is held on the village green. The festival was started in June 1969 to pay for rebuilding of the village hall and its upkeep. After a gap of nine years the festival was revived. Its main purpose now is provide the community with a weekend of events, as well as another being created which also occurs annually in early Autumn.

Hatfield Heath Cricket Club supports four teams, with its home ground the village green. The First XI play in the Herts and Essex Cricket League Division 2 (2018).

The parish includes Down Hall country house and estate. Pincey Brook, a tributary of the River Stort, flows through the parish.

Beyond the north of the parish is Hatfield Forest, in the neighbouring civil parish of Hatfield Broad Oak, the best surviving example in Britain of an almost complete Royal Hunting Forest. The forest is open to the public and covers 1,049 acres (4 km^{2}) of woodland, grassland with trees, lake and marsh.

== Transport ==
Buses provide routes between Harlow and Chelmsford via The Rodings and Sheering, as well as a less frequent service between Stansted Airport and Bishop's Stortford via Little Hallingbury and Hatfield Broad Oak.

The nearest train station is located less than a mile away in nearby Sawbridgeworth, with other nearby train stations including Stansted Airport, Bishop's Stortford and Harlow Mill.

The closest motorway junction is the J7A in northern harlow on the M11 towards London or Cambridge.

== See also ==
The Hundred Parishes
