= Down Hall =

Country house in Essex, England

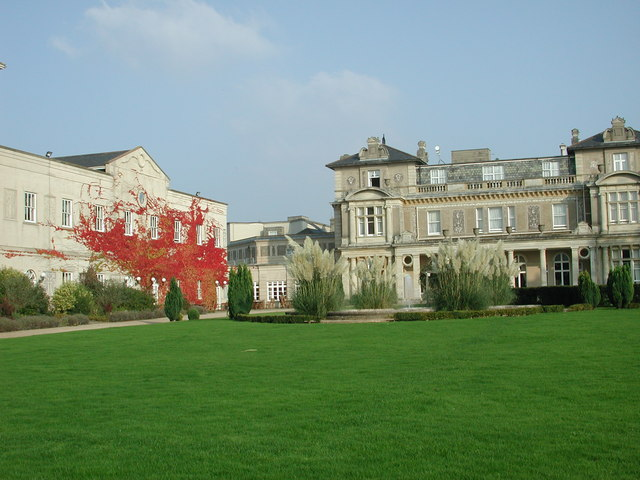

- Location within Essex

General information
- Architectural style: Elizabethan mansion
- Location: Hatfield Heath, Bishop's Stortford, Hertfordshire, United Kingdom
- Coordinates: 51.7957°N 0.2066°E
- Completed: 1873
- Client: Henry Selwin-Ibbetson, 1st Baron Rookwood

Design and construction
- Architect: Frederick Pepys Cockerell

Down Hall is a Victorian country house and estate near Hatfield Heath in the English county of Essex, close to its border with Hertfordshire. It is surrounded by 110 acres (0.45 km^{2}) of woodland, parkland and landscaped gardens, some of which is protected by the Essex Wildlife Trust.

== History ==
The first Down Hall was a Tudor house, once owned by poet Matthew Prior. Prior was acquainted with landscaper Charles Bridgeman, who he commissioned to landscape the estate's gardens. After Prior's death in 1721 (just one year after buying the property), the house was passed to his friend Edward Harley, 2nd Earl of Oxford and Earl Mortimer, who undertook further rebuilding. Twenty years later, and with the house still unfinished, Harley died.

=== Selwin family ===
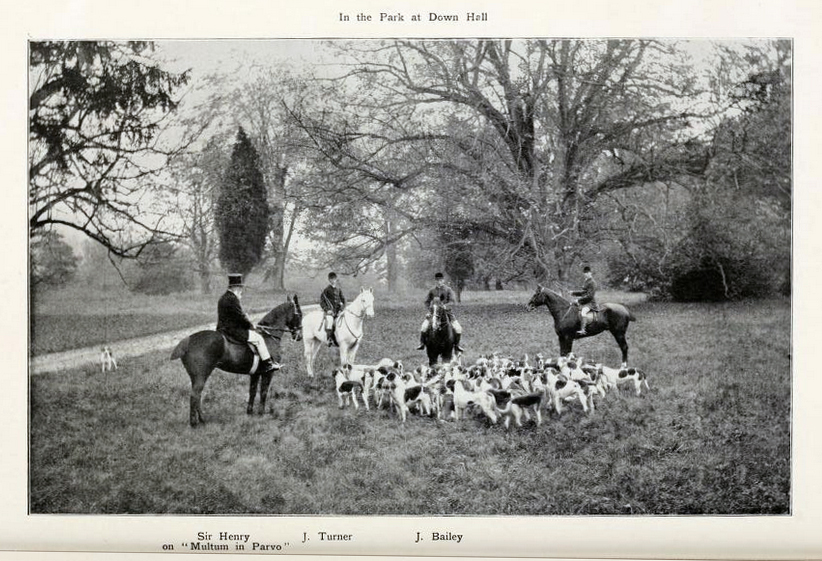
Henry John Selwin-Ibbetson in 1900

Upon Harley's death in 1741, the house was purchased by William Selwin, a wealthy silk merchant, for £4500. The estate remained in the Selwin family until 1902, where – on the death of Henry Selwin-Ibbetson, 1st Baron Rookwood (who had commissioned its full rebuilding in the late 1860s) – the Selwin and Ibbetson lineage died out.

=== World War I ===
During the First World War, the house was used as a sanatorium for wounded soldiers. The estate was affected by the post-World War I recession, and was subsequently sold at auction.

=== Modern history ===
Following its sale, the house was used as a school (Downham School, 1932–c.1967) and an antiques business and conference centre (1967–1986).

In 1986, the estate was purchased by the Veladail Group, who have operated the site as a four-star hotel, conference centre and wedding venue since. British television personality Jade Goody wed her partner Jack Tweed at Down Hall on 22 February 2009.

Series eleven and twelve of The Great British Bake Off were filmed at Down Hall, where, due to COVID-19 restrictions, all cast and crew quarantined together in a "bubble" during the six weeks of filming.
