= List of civil parishes in Hertfordshire =

This is a list of civil parishes in the ceremonial county of Hertfordshire, England. There are 128 civil parishes.

== List of civil parishes and unparished areas ==
Image	Name	Status	District	Pre-1974 district	Ref(s)
	Cheshunt	Unparished area	Broxbourne	Cheshunt Urban District	
	Hoddesdon	Unparished area	Broxbourne	Hoddesdon Urban District	
	Hemel Hempstead	Unparished area	Dacorum	Hemel Hempstead Municipal Borough	
	Aldbury	Civil parish	Dacorum	Berkhamsted Rural District	
	Berkhamsted	Town	Dacorum	Berkhamsted Urban District	
	Bovingdon	Civil parish	Dacorum	Hemel Hempstead Rural District	
	Chipperfield	Civil parish	Dacorum	Hemel Hempstead Rural District	
	Flamstead	Civil parish	Dacorum	Hemel Hempstead Rural District	
	Flaunden	Civil parish	Dacorum	Hemel Hempstead Rural District	
	Great Gaddesden	Civil parish	Dacorum	Hemel Hempstead Rural District	
	Kings Langley	Civil parish	Dacorum	Hemel Hempstead Rural District	
	Little Gaddesden	Civil parish	Dacorum	Berkhamsted Rural District	
	Markyate	Civil parish	Dacorum	Hemel Hempstead Rural District	
	Nash Mills	Civil parish	Dacorum	Watford Rural District	
	Nettleden with Potten End	Civil parish	Dacorum	Berkhamsted Rural District	
	Northchurch	Civil parish	Dacorum	Berkhamsted Rural District	
	Tring	Town	Dacorum	Tring Urban District	
	Tring Rural	Civil parish	Dacorum	Berkhamsted Rural District	
	Wigginton	Civil parish	Dacorum	Berkhamsted Rural District	
	Albury	Civil parish	East Hertfordshire	Braughing Rural District	
	Anstey	Civil parish	East Hertfordshire	Braughing Rural District	
	Ardeley	Civil parish	East Hertfordshire	Braughing Rural District	
	Aspenden	Civil parish	East Hertfordshire	Braughing Rural District	
	Aston	Civil parish	East Hertfordshire	Hertford Rural District	
	Bayford	Civil parish	East Hertfordshire	Hertford Rural District	
	Bengeo Rural	Civil parish	East Hertfordshire	Hertford Rural District	
	Benington	Civil parish	East Hertfordshire	Hertford Rural District	
	Bishop's Stortford	Town	East Hertfordshire	Bishop's Stortford Urban District	
	Bramfield	Civil parish	East Hertfordshire	Hertford Rural District	
	Braughing	Civil parish	East Hertfordshire	Braughing Rural District	
	Brent Pelham	Civil parish	East Hertfordshire	Braughing Rural District	
	Brickendon Liberty	Civil parish	East Hertfordshire	Hertford Rural District	
	Buckland and Chipping	Civil parish	East Hertfordshire	Braughing Rural District	
	Buntingford	Town	East Hertfordshire	Braughing Rural District	
	Cottered	Civil parish	East Hertfordshire	Braughing Rural District	
	Datchworth	Civil parish	East Hertfordshire	Hertford Rural District	
	Eastwick	Civil parish	East Hertfordshire	Ware Rural District	
	Furneux Pelham	Civil parish	East Hertfordshire	Braughing Rural District	
	Gilston	Civil parish	East Hertfordshire	Ware Rural District	
	Great Amwell	Civil parish	East Hertfordshire	Ware Rural District	
	Great Munden	Civil parish	East Hertfordshire	Ware Rural District	
	Hertford	Town	East Hertfordshire	Hertford Municipal Borough	
	Hertford Heath	Civil parish	East Hertfordshire	Hertford Rural District	
	Hertingfordbury	Civil parish	East Hertfordshire	Hertford Rural District	
	High Wych	Civil parish	East Hertfordshire	Braughing Rural District	
	Hormead	Civil parish	East Hertfordshire	Braughing Rural District	
	Hunsdon	Civil parish	East Hertfordshire	Ware Rural District	
	Little Berkhamsted	Civil parish	East Hertfordshire	Hertford Rural District	
	Little Hadham	Civil parish	East Hertfordshire	Braughing Rural District	
	Little Munden	Civil parish	East Hertfordshire	Ware Rural District	
	Meesden	Civil parish	East Hertfordshire	Braughing Rural District	
	Much Hadham	Civil parish	East Hertfordshire	Braughing Rural District	
	Sacombe	Civil parish	East Hertfordshire	Hertford Rural District	
	Sawbridgeworth	Town	East Hertfordshire	Sawbridgeworth Urban District	
	Standon	Civil parish	East Hertfordshire	Ware Rural District	
	Stanstead Abbots	Civil parish	East Hertfordshire	Ware Rural District	
	Stanstead St Margarets	Civil parish	East Hertfordshire	Ware Rural District	
	Stapleford and Waterford	Civil parish	East Hertfordshire	Hertford Rural District	
	Stocking Pelham	Civil parish	East Hertfordshire	Braughing Rural District	
	Tewin	Civil parish	East Hertfordshire	Hertford Rural District	
	Thorley	Civil parish	East Hertfordshire	Braughing Rural District	
	Thundridge	Civil parish	East Hertfordshire	Ware Rural District	
	Walkern	Civil parish	East Hertfordshire	Hertford Rural District	
	Ware	Town	East Hertfordshire	Ware Urban District	
	Wareside	Civil parish	East Hertfordshire	Ware Rural District	
	Watton at Stone	Civil parish	East Hertfordshire	Hertford Rural District	
	Westmill	Civil parish	East Hertfordshire	Braughing Rural District	
	Widford	Civil parish	East Hertfordshire	Ware Rural District	
	Wyddial	Civil parish	East Hertfordshire	Braughing Rural District	
	Aldenham	Civil parish	Hertsmere	Watford Rural District	
	Bushey	Unparished area	Hertsmere	Bushey Urban District	
	Elstree and Borehamwood	Town	Hertsmere	Elstree Rural District	
	Potters Bar	Unparished area	Hertsmere	Potters Bar Urban District	
	Hertsmere Meriden	Civil parish	Hertsmere	Watford Rural District	
	Shenley	Civil parish	Hertsmere	Elstree Rural District	
	South Mimms and Ridge	Civil parish	Hertsmere	Potters Bar Urban District and Elstree Rural District	
	Ashwell	Civil parish	North Hertfordshire	Hitchin Rural District	
	Baldock	Unparished area	North Hertfordshire	Baldock Urban District	
	Barkway	Civil parish	North Hertfordshire	Hitchin Rural District	
	Barley	Civil parish	North Hertfordshire	Hitchin Rural District	
	Bygrave	Civil parish	North Hertfordshire	Hitchin Rural District	
	Caldecote	Civil parish	North Hertfordshire	Hitchin Rural District	
	Clothall	Civil parish	North Hertfordshire	Hitchin Rural District	
	Codicote	Civil parish	North Hertfordshire	Hitchin Rural District	
	Graveley	Civil parish	North Hertfordshire	Hitchin Rural District	
	Great Ashby	Civil parish	North Hertfordshire	Hitchin Rural District	
	Hexton	Civil parish	North Hertfordshire	Hitchin Rural District	
	Hinxworth	Civil parish	North Hertfordshire	Hitchin Rural District	
	Hitchin	Unparished area	North Hertfordshire	Hitchin Urban District	
	Holwell	Civil parish	North Hertfordshire	Hitchin Rural District	
	Ickleford	Civil parish	North Hertfordshire	Hitchin Rural District	
	Kelshall	Civil parish	North Hertfordshire	Hitchin Rural District	
	Kimpton	Civil parish	North Hertfordshire	Hitchin Rural District	
	King's Walden	Civil parish	North Hertfordshire	Hitchin Rural District	
	Knebworth	Civil parish	North Hertfordshire	Hitchin Rural District	
	Langley	Civil parish	North Hertfordshire	Hitchin Rural District	
	Letchworth Garden City	Unparished area	North Hertfordshire	Letchworth Urban District	
	Lilley	Civil parish	North Hertfordshire	Hitchin Rural District	
	Newnham	Civil parish	North Hertfordshire	Hitchin Rural District	
	Nuthampstead	Civil parish	North Hertfordshire	Hitchin Rural District	
	Offley	Civil parish	North Hertfordshire	Hitchin Rural District	
	Pirton	Civil parish	North Hertfordshire	Hitchin Rural District	
	Preston	Civil parish	North Hertfordshire	Hitchin Rural District	
	Radwell	Civil parish	North Hertfordshire	Hitchin Rural District	
	Reed	Civil parish	North Hertfordshire	Hitchin Rural District	
	Royston	Town	North Hertfordshire	Royston Urban District	
	Rushden	Civil parish	North Hertfordshire	Hitchin Rural District	
	Sandon	Civil parish	North Hertfordshire	Hitchin Rural District	
	St Ippolyts	Civil parish	North Hertfordshire	Hitchin Rural District	
	St Paul's Walden	Civil parish	North Hertfordshire	Hitchin Rural District	
	Therfield	Civil parish	North Hertfordshire	Hitchin Rural District	
	Wallington	Civil parish	North Hertfordshire	Hitchin Rural District	
	Weston	Civil parish	North Hertfordshire	Hitchin Rural District	
	Wymondley	Civil parish	North Hertfordshire	Hitchin Rural District	
	St Albans	Unparished area	St Albans	St Albans Municipal Borough	
	Colney Heath	Civil parish	St Albans	St Albans Rural District	
	Harpenden Town	Town	St Albans	Harpenden Urban District	
	Harpenden Rural	Civil parish	St Albans	St Albans Rural District	
	London Colney	Civil parish	St Albans	St Albans Rural District	
	Redbourn	Civil parish	St Albans	St Albans Rural District	
	Sandridge	Civil parish	St Albans	St Albans Rural District	
	St Michael	Civil parish	St Albans	St Albans Rural District	
	St Stephen	Civil parish	St Albans	St Albans Rural District	
	Wheathampstead	Civil parish	St Albans	St Albans Rural District	
	Stevenage	Unparished area	Stevenage	Stevenage Urban District	
	Abbots Langley	Civil parish	Three Rivers	Watford Rural District	
	Batchworth	Civil parish	Three Rivers	Rickmansworth Urban District	
	Rickmansworth (part)	Unparished area	Three Rivers	Rickmansworth Urban District	
	Chorleywood	Civil parish	Three Rivers	Chorleywood Urban District	
	Croxley Green	Civil parish	Three Rivers	Rickmansworth Urban District	
	Sarratt	Civil parish	Three Rivers	Watford Rural District	
	Watford Rural	Civil parish	Three Rivers	Watford Rural District	
	Watford	Unparished area	Watford	Watford Municipal Borough	
	Welwyn Garden City	Unparished area	Welwyn Hatfield	Welwyn Garden City Urban District	
	Ayot St Lawrence	Civil parish	Welwyn Hatfield	Welwyn Rural District	
	Ayot St Peter	Civil parish	Welwyn Hatfield	Welwyn Rural District	
	Essendon	Civil parish	Welwyn Hatfield	Hatfield Rural District	
	Hatfield	Town	Welwyn Hatfield	Hatfield Rural District	
	North Mymms	Civil parish	Welwyn Hatfield	Hatfield Rural District	
	Northaw and Cuffley	Civil parish	Welwyn Hatfield	Hatfield Rural District	
	Welwyn	Civil parish	Welwyn Hatfield	Welwyn Rural District	
	Woolmer Green	Civil parish	Welwyn Hatfield	Welwyn Rural District	

== See also ==
- List of civil parishes in England
- List of settlements in Hertfordshire by population
- The Hundred Parishes, a grouping of parishes in East and North Herts, NW Essex and southern Cambridgeshire
