= List of places in Hertfordshire =

The seven most populated towns of Hertfordshire.

This is a list of settlements in Hertfordshire by population based on the results of the 2021 census. The next United Kingdom census will take place in 2031.

== A ==
- Abbots Langley, Adeyfield, Albury, Albury End, Aldbury, Aldenham, Amwell, Ansells End, Anstey, Apsley, Ardeley, Ashridge, Ashwell, Aspenden, Aston End, Astrope, Ayot Green, Ayot St Lawrence, Ayot St Peter

== B ==
- Babbs Green, Bakers End, Baldock, Ballingdon Bottom, Barkway, Barley, Barleycroft End, Barkway, Batchworth, Batford, Bayford, Bayfordbury, Bedmond, Bell Bar, Belsize, Benington, Bennetts End, Berkhamsted, Hertingfordbury, Bishop's Stortford, Borehamwood, Bourne End, Bovingdon, Bower Heath, Boxmoor, Bozen Green, Bragbury End, Bramfield, Braughing, Braughing Friars, Brent Pelham, Brickendon, Bricket Wood, Bridens Camp, Great Gaddesden, Brookmans Park, Broxbourne, Buckland, Buntingford, Bury Green, Bushey, Bushey Heath, Bygrave

== C ==
- Caldecote, Carpenders Park, Chapmore End, Charlton, Chaulden, Cherry Green, Chipperfield, Chipping, Chiswell Green, Cheshunt, Chorleywood, Codicote, Cold Christmas, Cole Green, Coleman Green, Colliers End, Colney Heath, Colney Street, Cottered, Cow Roast, Cromer Hyde, Croxley Green, Cuffley, Clothall

== D ==
- Dane End, Datchworth, Digswell, Dudswell

== E ==
- Eastbury, Eastwick, Elstree, Essendon

== F ==
- Felden, Fields End, Flamstead, Flaunden, Frithsden, Furneaux Pelham

== G ==
- Gadebridge, Garston, Gilston, Goffs Oak, Gosmore, Graveley, Great Amwell, Great Gaddesden, Great Hormead, Great Munden, Great Offley, Great Wymondley, Gubblecote, Green End

== H ==
- Hadham Ford, Little Hadham, Harpenden, Hastoe, Hatfield, Hemel Hempstead, Heronsgate, Hertford, Hertford Heath, Hertingfordbury, Hexton, High Cross, High Wych, Highfield, Hinxworth, Hitchin, Hoddesdon, Holwell, How Wood, Hunsdon, Hunton Bridge

== I ==
- Ickleford

== J ==
- Jersey Farm

== K ==
- Kelshall, Kensworth, Kimpton, King's Walden, Kings Langley, Kinsbourne Green, Knebworth

== L ==
- Labby Green and Letty Green, Hertingfordbury, Langley, Langleybury, Leavesden, Lemsford, Letchmore Heath, Letchworth Garden City, Leverstock Green, Lilley, Little Amwell, Little Berkhamsted, Little Gaddesden, Little Hadham, Little Hormead, Little Munden, Little Offley, Little Wymondley, London Colney, Long Marston, Loudwater

== M ==
- Maple Cross, Markyate, Marshalswick, Micklefield Green, Sarratt, Mill End, Sandon, Mill End, Rickmansworth, Moor Park, Much Hadham

== N ==
- Napsbury including Napsbury Park, Nash Mills, Nasty, Great Munden, Nettleden, Newgate Street, Newnham, New Mill, Tring, Northaw, Northchurch, North Mymms, Norton, Nuthampstead

== O ==
- Oaklands, Offley, Old Hall Green, Old Hatfield, Old Knebworth, Oxhey

== P ==
- Park Street, Piccotts End, Pimlico, Bedmond, Pirton, Potten End, Potters Bar, Preston, Puckeridge, Puttenham

== R ==
- Radlett, Radwell, Redbourn, Reed, Rickmansworth, Ridge, Ringshall, Roe Green, Royston, Rush Green, Rushden

== S ==
- Sacombe, Sacombe Green, St Albans, St Ippolyts, St Paul's Walden, St Stephen, Sandon, Sandridge, Sarratt, Sawbridgeworth, Shenley (including Shenleybury), Smallford, South Mimms, South Oxhey, Spellbrook, Staines Green, Hertingfordbury, Standon, Standon Green End, Stanstead Abbotts, Stanstead St Margarets, Stapleford, Stevenage, Stocking Pelham

== T ==
- Tewin, Therfield, Thorley, Thundridge, Tonwell, Tring, Tring Station, Trowley Bottom

== W ==
- Wadesmill, Walkern, Wallington, Walsworth, Waltham Cross, Ware, Wareside, Warner's End, Waterford, Water End, Dacorum, Water End, North Mymms, Watford, Watton-at-Stone, Welham Green, Well End, Wellpond Green, Welwyn, Welwyn Garden City, Westmill, Weston, Westwick Row, West Hyde, Wheathampstead, Whempstead, Whitwell, Widford, Wigginton, Willian, Wilstone, Woodhall Farm, Woollensbrook, Woolmer Green, Wormley, Wyddial

== See also ==
- List of settlements in Hertfordshire by population
- List of places in England
