= London Traffic Area =

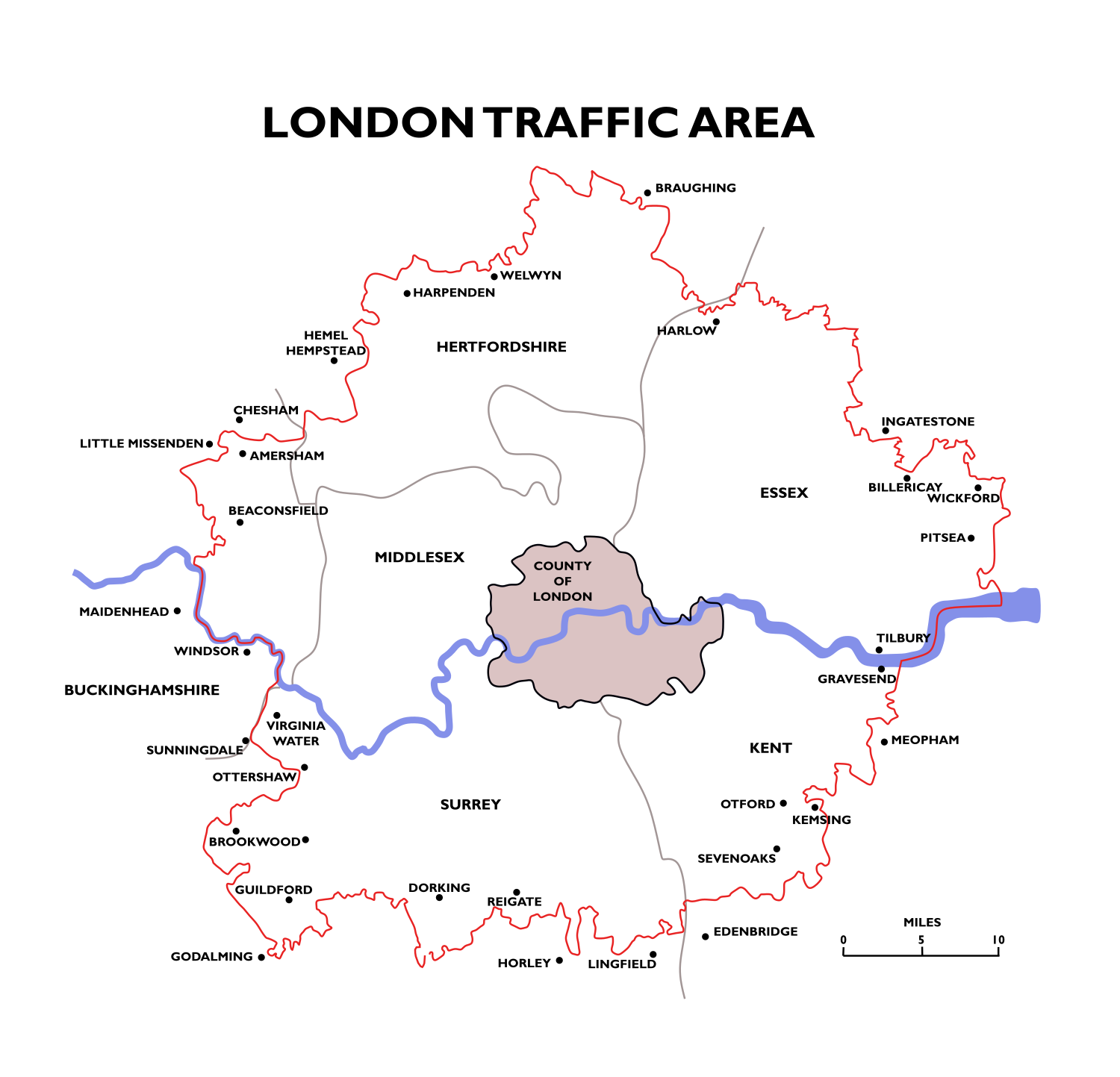
Map of the London Transport Area (red outline) covering the County of London, Middlesex and parts of Buckinghamshire, Essex, Hertfordshire, Kent and Surrey.

The London Traffic Area was established by the London Traffic Act 1924 to regulate the increasing amount of motor traffic in the London area. The LTA was abolished in 1965 on the establishment of the Greater London Council.

The traffic area extended for about 25 miles (40 kilometres) from Charing Cross in central London, and was thus much larger than the existing County of London or Metropolitan Police District. It included the whole of the County of London and Middlesex, much of Surrey and Hertfordshire, plus parts of Kent, Buckinghamshire, Berkshire and Essex. At its outer limits it included Harlow, Billericay, Gravesend, Sevenoaks, Reigate, Guildford, Slough, Amersham, Harpenden and Stevenage.

The traffic area was defined by Schedule 1 of the Act as:

- The administrative county of London;
- The administrative county of Middlesex;
- The county boroughs of Croydon, East Ham, and West Ham;
- So much of the administrative county of Buckingham as comprises:—
  - The urban districts of Beaconsfield, Eton, and Slough;
  - The rural district of Eton;
  - The parishes of Amersham, Chalfont St Giles, Chalfont St Peter, Chenies, and Penn; Coleshill Hamlet and Seer Green Chapelry in the rural district of Amersham;
- So much of the administrative county of Essex as comprises:—
  - The urban districts of Barking Town, Brentwood, Buckhurst Hill, Chingford, Epping, Grays Thurrock, Ilford, Leyton, Loughton, Romford, Tilbury, Waltham Holy Cross, Walthamstow, Wanstead, and Woodford;
  - The rural districts of Billericay, Epping, Ongar, Orsett, and Romford:
- So much of the administrative county of Hertfordshire as comprises:—
  - The boroughs of St Albans, Hertford and Watford;
  - The urban districts of Barnet, Bushey, Cheshunt, Chorleywood, East Barnet Valley, Harpenden, Hoddesdon, Rickmansworth and Ware;
  - The rural districts of Barnet, Hatfield, Hertford, St. Alban's, Ware, Watford and Welwyn;
  - and the detached part (lying between the rural districts of Ware and Epping) of the parish of High Wych in the rural district of Hadham
- So much of the administrative county of Kent as comprises:—
  - The boroughs of Bromley and Gravesend;
  - The urban districts of Beckenham, Bexley, Chislehurst, Crayford, Dartford, Erith, Northfleet, Penge, Sevenoaks and Sidcup;
  - The rural districts of Bromley and Dartford;
  - The parishes of Brasted (excluding the detached portion), Chevening, Dunton Green, Halstead, Kemsing, Otford, Riverhead, Seal, Sevenoaks Weald, Shoreham, Sundridge, and Westerham, in the rural district of Sevenoaks:
- So much of the administrative county of Surrey as comprises:—
  - The boroughs of Guildford, Kingston upon Thames, Reigate, Richmond, and Wimbledon;
  - The urban districts of Barnes, Beddington and Wallington, Carshalton, Caterham, Chertsey, Coulsdon and Purley, Dorking, East and West Molesey, Egham, Epsom, Esher and the Dittons, Ham, Leatherhead, Merton and Morden, Mitcham, Surbiton, Sutton, The Maldens and Coombe, Walton-upon-Thames, Weybridge, and Woking;
  - The rural district of Epsom;
  - The parishes of Bisley, Byfleet, Pyrford, and Thorpe in the rural district of Chertsey;
  - The parishes of Dorking Rural, Effingham, and Mickleham in the rural district of Dorking;
  - The parishes of Addington, Bletchingley, Chelsham, Crowhurst, Farleigh Godstone (except the detached portion), Limpsfield, Oxted, Tandridge (except so much of the said parish as lies to the south of an imaginary straight line drawn from the point where the western boundary of the said parish joins the southern boundary of the parish of Godstone to the point where the eastern boundary of the said parish joins the southern boundary of the parish of Crowhurst), Tatsfield, Titsey, Warlingham, and Woldingham in the rural district of Godstone;
  - The parishes of Artington, East Clandon, East Horsley, Merrow, Ockham, Pirbright, Send and Ripley, West Clandon, West Horsley, Wisley and Worplesdon; and part of the parish of Compton in the rural district of Guildford;
  - The parishes of St. Martha (Chilworth) and Shalford in the rural district of Hambledon:
  - The parishes of Betchworth, Buckland, Chaldon, Chipstead, Gatton, Merstham, Nutfield, and Walton-on-the-Hill; and Kingswood Liberty in the rural district of Reigate.

The London and Home Counties Traffic Advisory Committee was set up to make recommendations on regulating and controlling motor traffic in the LTA, and presented annual reports to Parliament. The committee's included members appointed by the Ministry of Transport and by the local authorities in the traffic area.

The LTA and the advisory committee were abolished by the London Government Act 1963. From 1965 the Greater London Council exercised the powers over traffic regulation, although its area was much smaller than the traffic area.
