= List of lost settlements in Hertfordshire =

Where current settlements are listed they are not the same as the disappeared villages. For example, Stevenage relocated to be closer to the Great North Road, abandoning the previous Stevenage.

II denotes any change in position

Village or hamlet	Parish or Hundred	Coordinates
Aldwick	Tring	51.848959°N 0.704143°W
Alfledawich (Beauchamps)	Layston with Buntingford	51.963885°N 0.012495°E
Alswick	Layston with Buntingford	51.94696°N 0.003006°W
Aspenden II	Aspenden	51.941379°N 0.039441°W
Ayot St Lawrence	Ayot St Lawrence	51.837921°N 0.266054°W
Ayot St Peter	Ayot St Peter	51.820325°N 0.231902°W
Berkeden (Berkesdon Green)	Aspenden	51.930885°N 0.057355°W
Betlow	Tring	51.846182°N 0.696963°W
Bordesden (Bozen Green)	Braughing	51.925389°N 0.05441°W
Boxbury	Walkern	51.923328°N 0.146406°W
Bricewold	Hertford Hundred	Unlocated
Brickendon	Brickendon	51.777329°N 0.071208°W
Broadfield	Cottered	51.961679°N 0.070581°W
Broadmead	Tring	51.848959°N 0.704143°W
Burston	St Stephens	51.720505°N 0.355979°W
Caldecote	Caldecote	52.031112°N 0.195896°W
Chaldean	Much Hadham	51.864903°N 0.067632°E
Chesfield	Graveley	51.934724°N 0.185217°W
Childwick	St. Michaels, St. Albans	51.783302°N 0.344997°W
Cockenach	Barkway	51.952752°N 0.032373°E
Cockhamsted	Braughing	51.908138°N 0.063801°E
Corney Bury	Wyddial	51.958186°N 0.022695°W
Digswell	Digswell	51.819031°N 0.205833°W
Flaunden	Flaunden	51.699853°N 0.529232°W
Flexmere	Kings Walden	51.887905°N 0.301917°W
Gilston	Gilston	51.801564°N 0.089392°E
Great Munden	Great Munden	51.900746°N 0.02958°W
Gubblecote	Tring	51.828074°N 0.685876°W
Hainstone	Odsey Hundred (? near Hinxworth)	Unlocated
Hanstead	St Stephens	51.702366°N 0.345057°W
Hixham	Furneux Pelham	51.920713°N 0.115284°E
Hodenhoe	Therfield	51.982742°N 0.039091°W
Ichetone (Layston)	Layston with Buntingford	51.951601°N 0.00552°W
Kitts End	South Mymms	51.671284°N 0.201927°W
Lewarewich (Leverage)	Much Hadham/Widford	near 51.828651°N 0.083388°E
Libury (Stutereshele)	Little Munden	51.893799°N 0.04442°W
Mardley	Welwyn	51.850872°N 0.171167°W
Maydencroft (Furnival Dinsley)	St Ippolyts	51.932549°N 0.279865°W
Minsden	Langley	51.907041°N 0.257577°W
Miswell	Tring	51.799193°N 0.676563°W
Moor Green	Ardeley	51.922232°N 0.078092°W
Napsbury	St. Peter Rural	51.725283°N 0.312363°W
Nettleden II	Nettleden	51.783035°N 0.527696°W
Newsells	Barkway	52.015905°N 0.02066°E
North Mymms	North Mymms	51.725866°N 0.229798°W
Oxwich	Broadwater Hundred	near Codicote
Pendley	Tring	51.795965°N 0.630247°W
Plashes	Standon	51.864137°N 0.008039°E
Queenhoo	Tewin	51.829769°N 0.144445°W
Quickswood	Clothall	51.978956°N 0.138285°W
Rodenhanger	Norton	51.989472°N 0.208944°W
Sapeham	Edwinstree Hundred	Unlocated
Stagenhoe	St Paul's Walden	51.890221°N 0.275669°W
Stanstead Abbots	Stanstead Abbots	51.780139°N 0.028955°E
Stevenage	Stevenage	51.920501°N 0.195972°W
Stivicesworde	Hertford Hundred	Unlocated
Stocks	Aldbury	51.810041°N 0.603707°W
Stonebury	Little Hormead	51.935079°N 0.014116°E
Temple Dinsley	Preston	51.90918°N 0.280758°W
Thorley	Thorley	51.848249°N 0.14383°E
Throcking	Throcking	51.955101°N 0.053397°W
Thundridge	Thundridge	51.839319°N 0.013391°W
Tiscott	Tring	51.851799°N 0.71713°W
Titburst (Theobald Street)	Aldenham	
Wakeley	Westmill	51.924426°N 0.047452°W
Wandon	St Paul's Walden	51.889547°N 0.354176°W
Wellbury	Offley	51.954956°N 0.337227°W
Welei (Wain Wood)	Hitchin Half-Hundred (in Ippollitts)	Unlocated
Wickham	Bishops Stortford	51.886016°N 0.144174°E
Windridge	St. Michaels, St. Albans	51.738684°N 0.369804°W
Wollenwick (Woolwicks)	Stevenage	51.912811°N 0.222455°W

== Reasons for desertion ==
- Climatic change - several calamitous harvests from 1272 on, the end of the Medieval Warm Period followed by a persistently wetter and cooler climate from 1300, and disastrous years in 1317–19. Great variability in the weather, notably the seven-day storm of January 1362.
- Agrarian blight - land that had previously been the most fertile (especially toward the north-east of the county) had been overfarmed. The rise of grain prices following climatic change led to a preference for arable farming over stock. Stock levels also fell due to murrain. The consequent lack of manure from stock let to the land's fertility declining. See Great Famine of 1315-1317 and the List of famines.
- Black Death (1348-9)
- Migration - village relocates to be nearer major road in order to exploit passing trade, as Stevenage did in regard to the Great North Road. The new location positioned it to be an obvious choice for the core of one of the country's first new towns.
- Pasture - the switch to pasture, exemplified by the enclosures, required less manpower, leading to the decline of village life.
- Landscaping - village destroyed or relocated to create parkland for a noble's house. Pendley, destroyed soon after 1440 for Sir Robert Whittingham. Kitts End was incorporated in the Byng (Viscount Torrington) family's Wrotham Park estate in the 19th century having dwindled after the construction of a new Barnet - Ridge Hill road in 1826.
- Urban growth - the growth of Baldock, Buntingford, Royston, St Albans and others with markets or monastic premises seems to have sucked the life from several villages nearby.
