= Ware Rural District =

History of Hertfordshire

Coordinates: 51.814°N 0.028°W

- Rural district
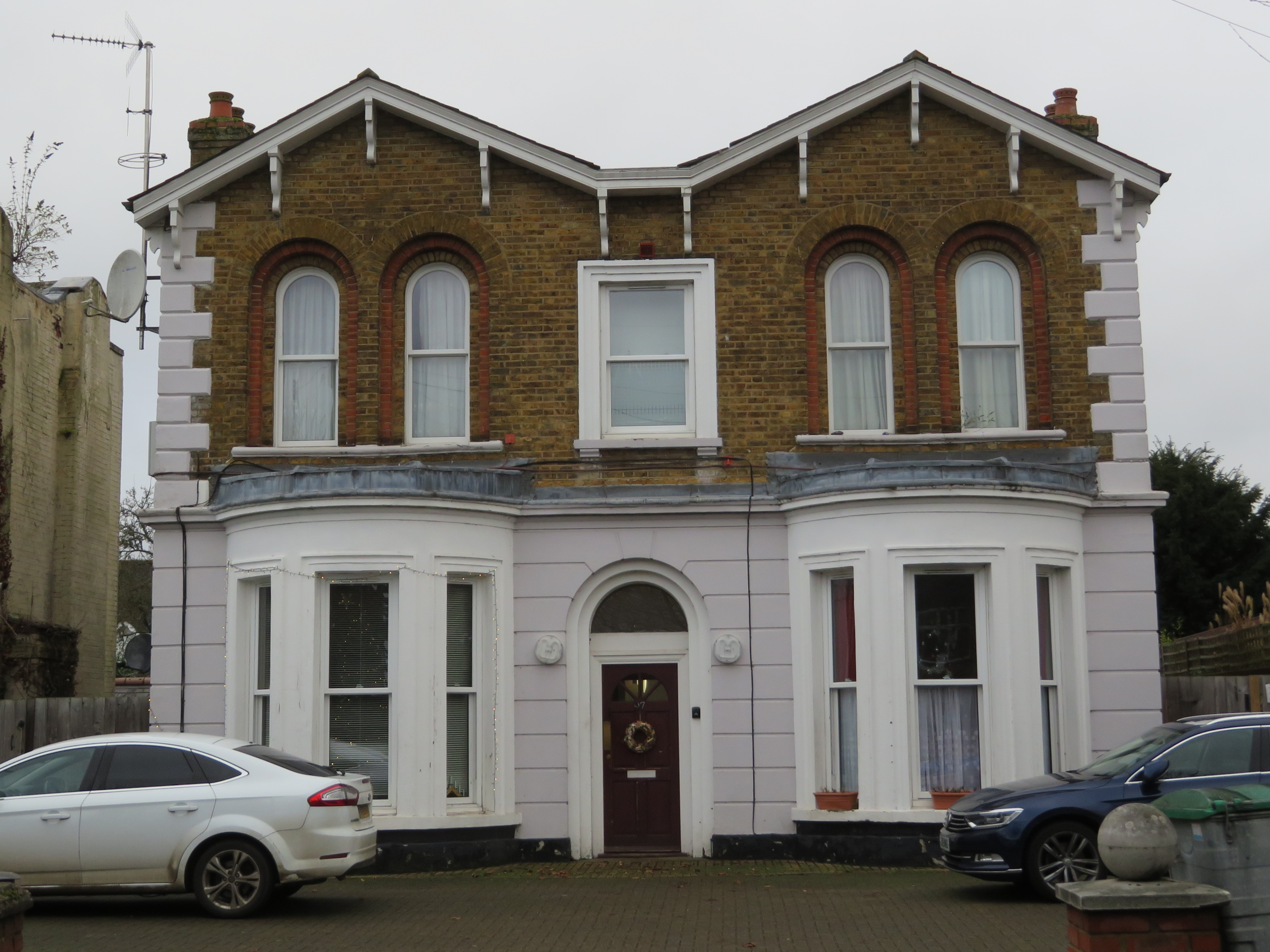
- Council offices: 97 New Road, Ware
- Population
  - 1901: 10,891
  - 1971: 11,550
- History
  - Created: 28 December 1894
  - Abolished: 31 March 1974
  - Succeeded by: East Hertfordshire
  - HQ: Ware
- Contained within
  - County Council: Hertfordshire

Ware Rural District was a rural district in Hertfordshire, England from 1894 to 1974, covering an area in the east of the county.

== Evolution ==
The district had its origins in the Ware Rural Sanitary District. This had been created under the Public Health Act 1872, giving public health and local government responsibilities for rural areas to the existing boards of guardians of poor law unions. The Ware Rural Sanitary District covered the area of the Ware Poor Law Union excluding the town of Ware.

Under the Local Government Act 1894, rural sanitary districts became rural districts from 28 December 1894. Prior to the act coming into force, Hertfordshire County Council made an order directing that the town of Hoddesdon, which was in the Ware Rural Sanitary District, should become an urban district in its own right rather than be included in the Ware Rural District. The link with the poor law union continued, with all the elected councillors of the rural district council being ex officio members of the Ware Board of Guardians.

== Parishes ==
Ware Rural District contained the following civil parishes.

Parish	From	To	Notes
Broxbourne	28 Dec 1894	31 Mar 1935	Abolished 1935, split between Hoddesdon Urban District and Brickendon Liberty parish.
Eastwick	28 Dec 1894	31 Mar 1974	
Gilston	28 Dec 1894	31 Mar 1974	
Great Amwell	28 Dec 1894	31 Mar 1974	
Great Munden	28 Dec 1894	31 Mar 1974	
Hoddesdon Rural	28 Dec 1894	31 Mar 1935	Created 1894 from that part of Hoddesdon parish not within the urban district. Abolished 1935, split between Hoddesdon Urban District and Brickendon Liberty parish.
Hunsdon	28 Dec 1894	31 Mar 1974	
Little Munden	28 Dec 1894	31 Mar 1974	
Standon	28 Dec 1894	31 Mar 1974	
Stanstead Abbots	28 Dec 1894	31 Mar 1974	
Stanstead St Margarets	28 Dec 1894	31 Mar 1974	
Thundridge	28 Dec 1894	31 Mar 1974	
Ware Rural	28 Dec 1894	31 Mar 1974	Created 1894 from that part of Ware parish not within the urban district.
Widford	28 Dec 1894	31 Mar 1974	
Wormley	28 Dec 1894	31 Mar 1935	Abolished 1935, split between Hoddesdon Urban District, Cheshunt Urban District, and Brickendon Liberty parish.

== Premises ==
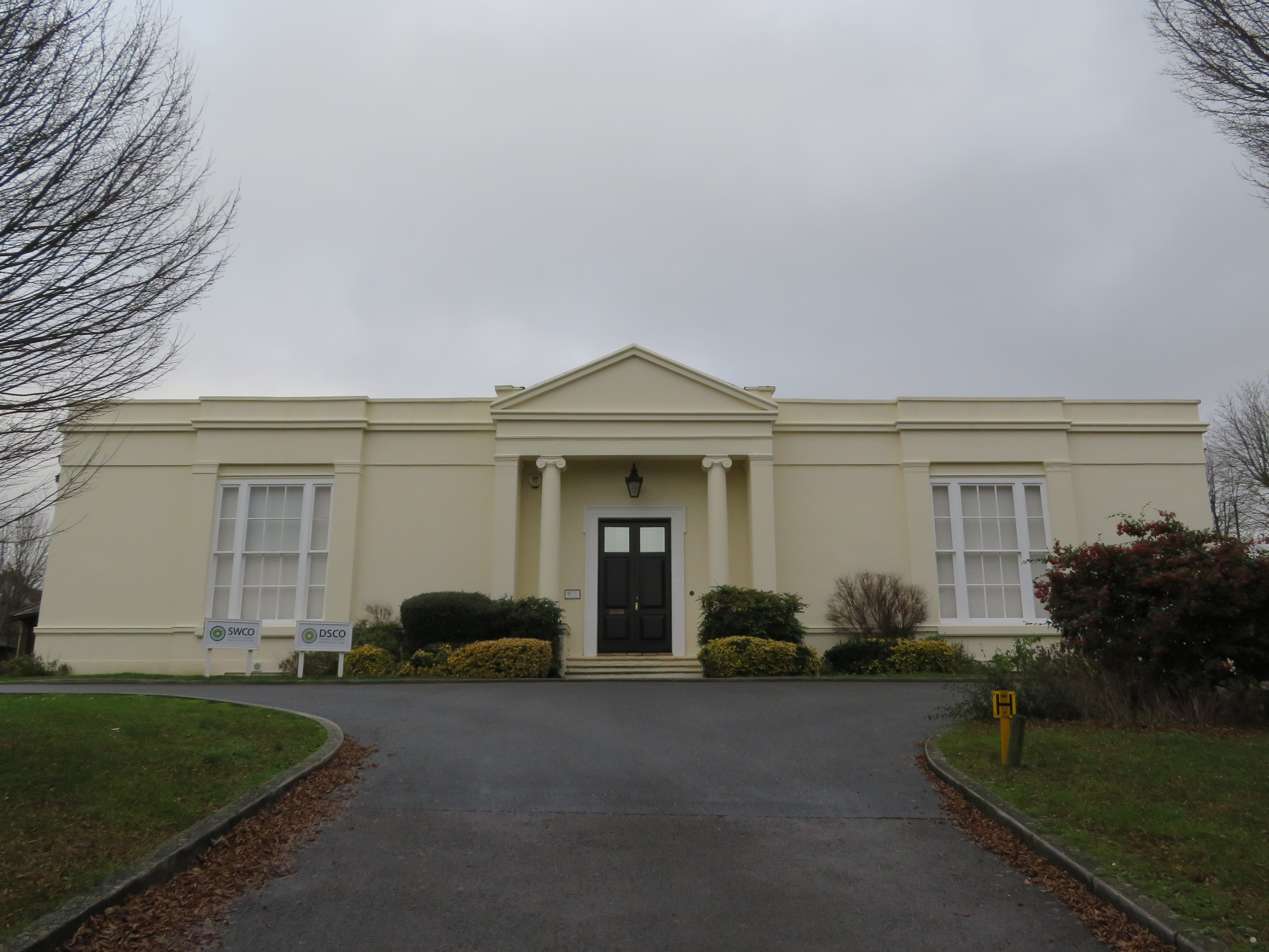
Council's meeting place until 1960: Union Workhouse / Western House, Collett Road, Ware

From the council's foundation until 1960 it met at the board room of the Ware Union Workhouse, later known as Western House, on Collett Road. Administrative office functions were carried out until 1934 at 8 West Street, which was shared with the Ware Urban District Council and the solicitors who acted as clerks to both councils. In 1934 the council acquired a house called The Laurels at 97 New Road, converting it to serve as offices. A council chamber was built to the rear of 97 New Road in 1960, after which the building served as both meeting place and offices for the council until its abolition. The council also built additional office space at 103 New Road in the mid 1960s.

== Abolition ==
Ware Rural District was abolished under the Local Government Act 1972, becoming part of the new district of East Hertfordshire on 1 April 1974. The old Ware Rural District Council main office at 97 New Road was subsequently converted into flats, whilst its other office at 103 New Road was used for various local authority functions for some years, with the site being redeveloped for houses in 2015.
