= List of settlements in Hertfordshire by population =

The 20 most populated settlements of the county of Hertfordshire, with district centres in yellow, and key towns and areas shown in white. . The county town is in bold.

This is a list of settlements in Hertfordshire ordered by population based on the results of the 2001 and 2011 censuses. In 2011 there were 35 settlements with 5,000 or more inhabitants in Hertfordshire. The last United Kingdom census was in 2021.

See the List of places in Hertfordshire article for an extensive list of local places and districts.

== List of settlements ==
#	Settlement	District	Population (2001)	Population (2011)
1	Watford	Watford	90,301	131,982^{†}
2	Hemel Hempstead	Dacorum	82,074	94,932
3	Stevenage	Stevenage	80,973	89,663
4	St Albans	St Albans	64,038	82,146
5	Welwyn Garden City	Welwyn Hatfield	43,252	48,380
6	Cheshunt	Broxbourne	38,726	45,832
7	Hoddesdon	Broxbourne	20,250	42,253
8	Bishop's Stortford	East Hertfordshire	34,929	37,838
9	Hatfield	Welwyn Hatfield	27,883	37,577
10	Borehamwood	Hertsmere	31,616	35,489
11	Hitchin	North Hertfordshire	30,769	34,266
12	Letchworth Garden City	North Hertfordshire	32,746	33,249
13	Harpenden	St Albans	27,959	30,240
14	Hertford	East Hertfordshire	24,180	26,658
15	Bushey	Hertsmere	14,488	25,328
16	Rickmansworth	Three Rivers	14,571	23,973
17	Potters Bar	Hertsmere	21,639	22,639
18	Berkhamsted	Dacorum	16,243	20,641
19	Abbots Langley	Three Rivers	10,472	19,574
20	Ware	East Hertfordshire	17,133	18,799
21	Royston	North Hertfordshire	14,366	15,781
22	Broxbourne	Broxbourne	13,298	15,303
23	Chorleywood	Three Rivers	6,814	12,948
24	Croxley Green	Three Rivers	11,520	12,562
25	South Oxhey	Three Rivers	11,983	See notes^{†}
26	Tring	Dacorum	11,635	11,929
27	Baldock	North Hertfordshire	9,867	10,280
28	Waltham Cross	Broxbourne	9,539	10,069
29	Sawbridgeworth	East Hertfordshire	7,666	9,800
30	London Colney	St Albans	7,518	9,507
31	Radlett	Hertsmere	8,134	8,163
32	Oaklands	Welwyn Hatfield	7,399	7,711
33	How Wood	St Albans	6,674	6,834
34	Eastbury/Moor Park/Northwood	Three Rivers	5,188	5,253
35	Redbourn	St Albans	4,680	5,113
36	Bovingdon	Dacorum	4,880	4,997
37	Buntingford	East Hertfordshire	4,820	4,948

Notes

† - Watford count includes South Oxhey

== See also ==
- List of civil parishes in Hertfordshire
- List of lost settlements in Hertfordshire
- List of Sites of Special Scientific Interest in Hertfordshire
- Parliamentary constituencies in Hertfordshire
- List of towns and cities in England by population
