= Hoddesdon Rural =

Coordinates: 51.754°N 0.045°W

- Civil parish
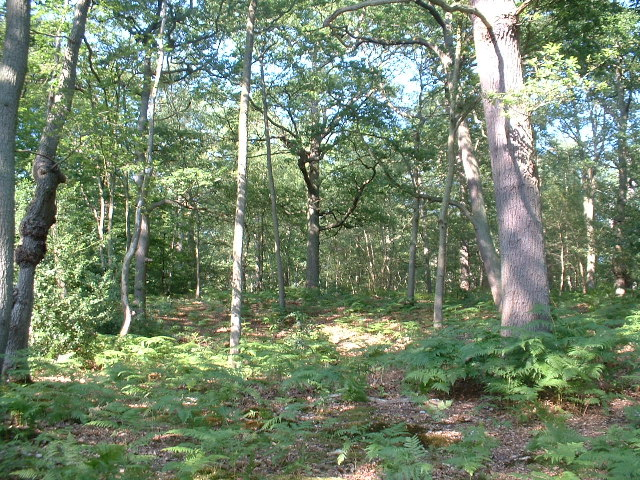
- Area
  - 1931: 1,110 acres (4.5 km^{2})
- Population
  - 1931: 58
- History
  - Created: 1894
  - Abolished: 1935
  - Succeeded by: Hoddesdon, Brickendon Liberty
- Contained within
  - Rural district: Ware Rural District

Hoddesdon Rural was a civil parish in the county of Hertfordshire, England. At the 1931 census (the last before the abolition of the parish), Hoddesdon Rural had a population of 58.

== History ==
Prior to 1894 the area had formed part of the parish of Hoddesdon (which had itself been created in 1866 from parts of the parishes of Broxbourne and Great Amwell). When parish and district councils were established under the Local Government Act 1894, it was decided that the town of Hoddesdon should be made its own urban district rather than being included in a rural district. However, it was also felt that the sparsely populated western part of Hoddesdon parish should not be included in an urban district. It was therefore decided before the act came into force that the Hoddesdon parish would be split into two parishes: Hoddesdon Urban, which would be coterminous with the Hoddesdon Urban District, and Hoddesdon Rural, which was included in the Ware Rural District.

The splitting of Hoddesdon into separate urban and rural parishes was not popular with the residents of Hoddesdon Rural; at its first parish meeting on 4 December 1894 the residents agreed to petition the authorities for "release from a ridiculous position". With only 20 electors and a tax income for the parish of no more than £15, the residents felt their interests would have been better served had they remained part of a united Hoddesdon parish. Despite the petition, the parish of Hoddesdon Rural endured for over forty years. The parish was finally abolished in 1935, with part being transferred to Hoddesdon Urban (which reverted to simply being called "Hoddesdon" at the same time) and the remainder being added to the new parish of Brickendon Liberty.

In 1974 the Hoddesdon part became part of Hoddesdon unparished area in Broxbourne non-metropolitan district and the Brickendon Liberty part became part of East Hertfordshire non-metropolitan district.
