= Hertford Rural District =

Former district in Hertfordshire, England

Coordinates: 51.79320°N 0.08125°W

Hertford
- Rural district
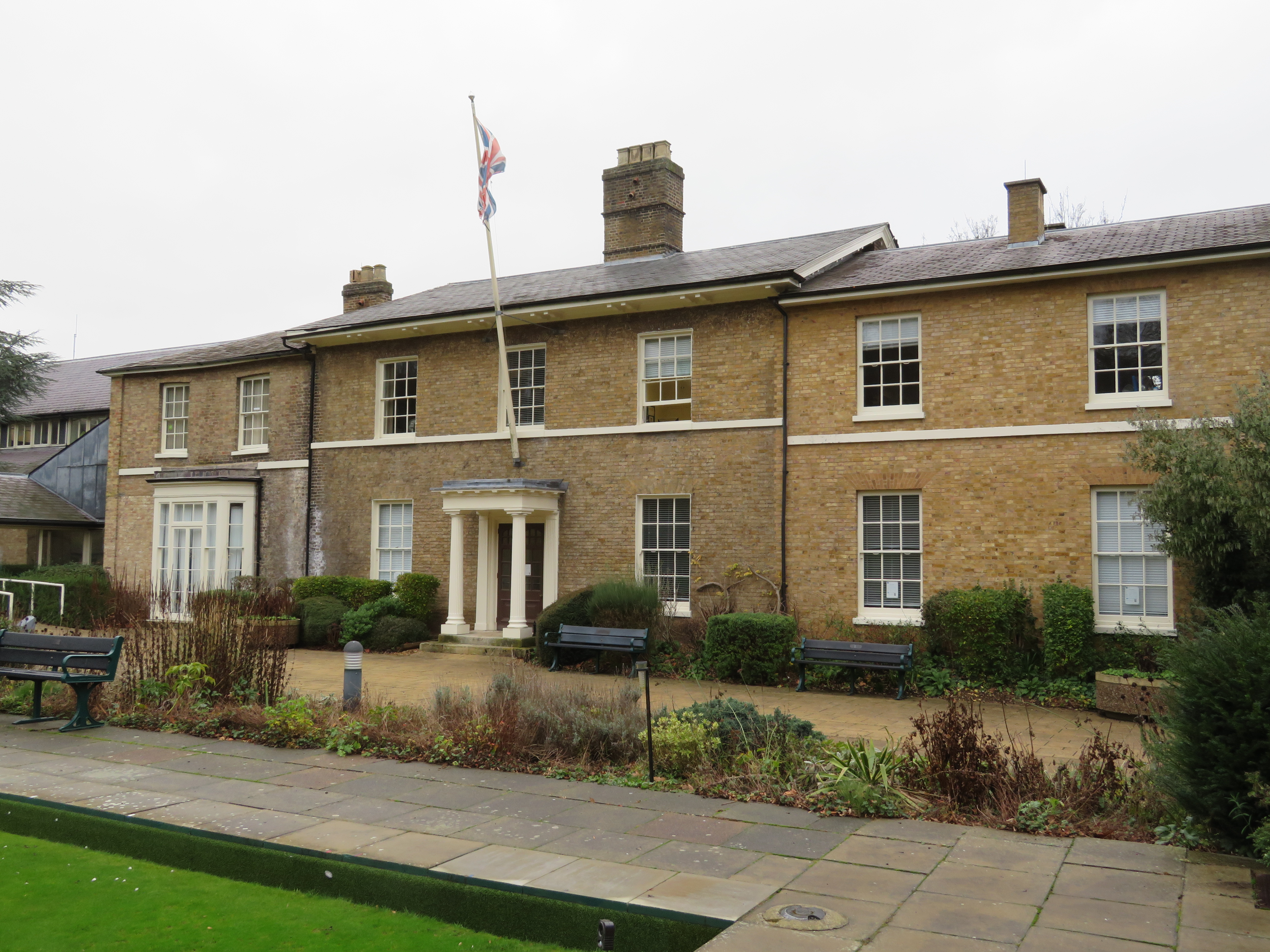
- Council offices: Wallfields, Pegs Lane, Hertford
- Population
  - 1911: 7,580
  - 1971: 12,020
- History
  - Created: 28 December 1894
  - Abolished: 31 March 1974
  - Succeeded by: East Hertfordshire
  - HQ: Hertford
- Contained within
  - County Council: Hertfordshire

Hertford Rural District was a rural district in Hertfordshire, England from 1894 to 1974. It covered the rural area around the county town of Hertford, but did not include the town itself.

== Evolution ==
The district had its origins in the Hertford Poor Law Union, which had been created in 1835. In 1872 rural sanitary districts were established, giving public health and local government responsibilities to the existing boards of guardians of poor law unions for any parts of their district which did not have an existing urban authority. The Hertford Rural Sanitary District therefore covered the area of the Hertford Poor Law Union except for Hertford itself, which was a municipal borough. Under the Local Government Act 1894, rural sanitary districts became rural districts with effect from 28 December 1894.

== Parishes ==
Hertford Rural District contained the following parishes:

Parish	From	To	Notes
Aston	28 Dec 1894	31 Mar 1974	
Bayford	28 Dec 1894	31 Mar 1974	
Bengeo Rural	28 Dec 1894	31 Mar 1974	Parish created 4 December 1894 from that part of former Bengeo parish outside the borough boundary of Hertford.
Benington	28 Dec 1894	31 Mar 1974	
Bramfield	28 Dec 1894	31 Mar 1974	
Brickendon Rural	28 Dec 1894	31 Mar 1929	Parish created 4 December 1894 from that part of former Brickendon parish outside the borough boundary of Hertford. Abolished to become part of Brickendon Liberty on 1 April 1929.
Brickendon Liberty	1 Apr 1929	31 Mar 1974	Parish created by merging former parishes of Brickendon Rural and St John Rural.
Datchworth	28 Dec 1894	31 Mar 1974	
Hertingfordbury	28 Dec 1894	31 Mar 1974	
Little Amwell	28 Dec 1894	31 Mar 1974	
Little Berkhamsted	28 Dec 1894	31 Mar 1974	
Sacombe	28 Dec 1894	31 Mar 1974	
St Andrew Rural	28 Dec 1894	31 Mar 1924	Parish created 4 December 1894 from that part of parish of St Andrew, Hertford outside the borough boundary. Abolished to become part of Hertingfordbury on 1 April 1924.
Stapleford	28 Dec 1894	31 Mar 1974	
St John Rural	28 Dec 1894	31 Mar 1929	Parish created 4 December 1894 from that part of parish of St John, Hertford outside the borough boundary. Abolished to become part of Brickendon Liberty on 1 April 1929.
Tewin	28 Dec 1894	31 Mar 1974	
Walkern	28 Dec 1894	31 Mar 1974	
Watton-at-Stone	28 Dec 1894	31 Mar 1974	

== Premises ==
The council initially met at the Shire Hall in Hertford, as the predecessor rural sanitary authority had done. Administrative office functions were carried out at 24 Castle Street, which was the offices of the solicitors who acted as clerks to the council. By 1933 the council was using the adjoining house at 20 Castle Street as its offices. The council remained at 20 Castle Street until 1950, when it bought to a large house called Wallfields on Pegs Lane and converted it to become its headquarters. The council remained based at Wallfields until its abolition.

== Abolition ==
Hertford Rural District was abolished under the Local Government Act 1972. Most of the area became part of the new district of East Hertfordshire on 1 April 1974, with the exception being a small area on the old rural district's north-western edge which was transferred to Stevenage as it was within the designated area for Stevenage New Town. The council's former offices at Wallfields were substantially extended to become the headquarters of East Hertfordshire District Council.
