= Welwyn Rural District =

History of Hertfordshire

Coordinates: 51.829°N 0.213°W

- Rural district
- Population
  - 1901: 2,234
  - 1971: 8,115
- History
  - Created: 28 December 1894
  - Abolished: 31 March 1974
  - Succeeded by: Welwyn Hatfield
  - HQ: Welwyn
- Contained within
  - County Council: Hertfordshire

Welwyn Rural District was a rural district in Hertfordshire, England from 1894 to 1974, covering an area in the centre of the county.

== Evolution ==
Welwyn Poor Law Union had been created in 1835 following the Poor Law Amendment Act 1834, centred on the small town of Welwyn. The population of the union at the time was less than 2,000 people, making it one of the smallest unions in the country. Under the Public Health Act 1872, sanitary districts were created, and the boards of guardians of poor law unions were made responsible for public health and local government for any part of their district not included in an urban authority. As the Welwyn Poor Law Union had no urban authorities, the Welwyn Rural Sanitary District covered the same area as the poor law union, and both were governed by the Welwyn Board of Guardians.

Under the Local Government Act 1894, rural sanitary districts became rural districts from 28 December 1894. The link with the poor law union continued, with all the elected councillors of the rural district council being ex officio members of the Welwyn Board of Guardians. The council met at the workhouse in Welwyn. The first chairman of the council was Arthur Maurice Blake of Danesbury House, who was a Conservative.

In 1920, work began on Welwyn Garden City, with the area for the proposed town straddling four parishes in three districts: Welwyn and Digswell parishes in Welwyn Rural District, Hatfield parish in Hatfield Rural District and Tewin parish in Hertford Rural District. A new parish called Welwyn Garden City was created on 1 October 1921 from parts of these four parishes, with the new parish being placed entirely in the Welwyn Rural District. The Welwyn Rural District Council was therefore the local authority responsible for overseeing early work on the garden city. Less than six years later, on 1 April 1927, Welwyn Garden City became an urban district.

== Parishes ==
Welwyn Rural District contained the following civil parishes:

Parish	From	To	Notes
Ayot St Lawrence	28 Dec 1894	31 Mar 1974	
Ayot St Peter	28 Dec 1894	31 Mar 1974	
Digswell	28 Dec 1894	31 Mar 1935	Large part of parish transferred to new Welwyn Garden City parish in 1921, including the old Digswell village around the parish church and Digswell House. Residual parish abolished 1935 to become part of Welwyn.
Welwyn	28 Dec 1894	31 Mar 1974	
Welwyn Garden City	1 Oct 1921	31 Mar 1927	Parish created from parts of Digswell, Hatfield, Tewin, and Welwyn parishes. Became separate urban district on 1 April 1927.

== Premises ==
In the council's early years, when the Welwyn Rural District Council and the Welwyn Board of Guardians were the same group of people, they met at the boardroom of the workhouse on London Road in Welwyn. The Welwyn Poor Law Union was abolished in 1921, merging with the neighbouring Hatfield Poor Law Union. The old Welwyn workhouse initially became a children's home before being converted to three houses, called 44, 46 and 48 London Road.

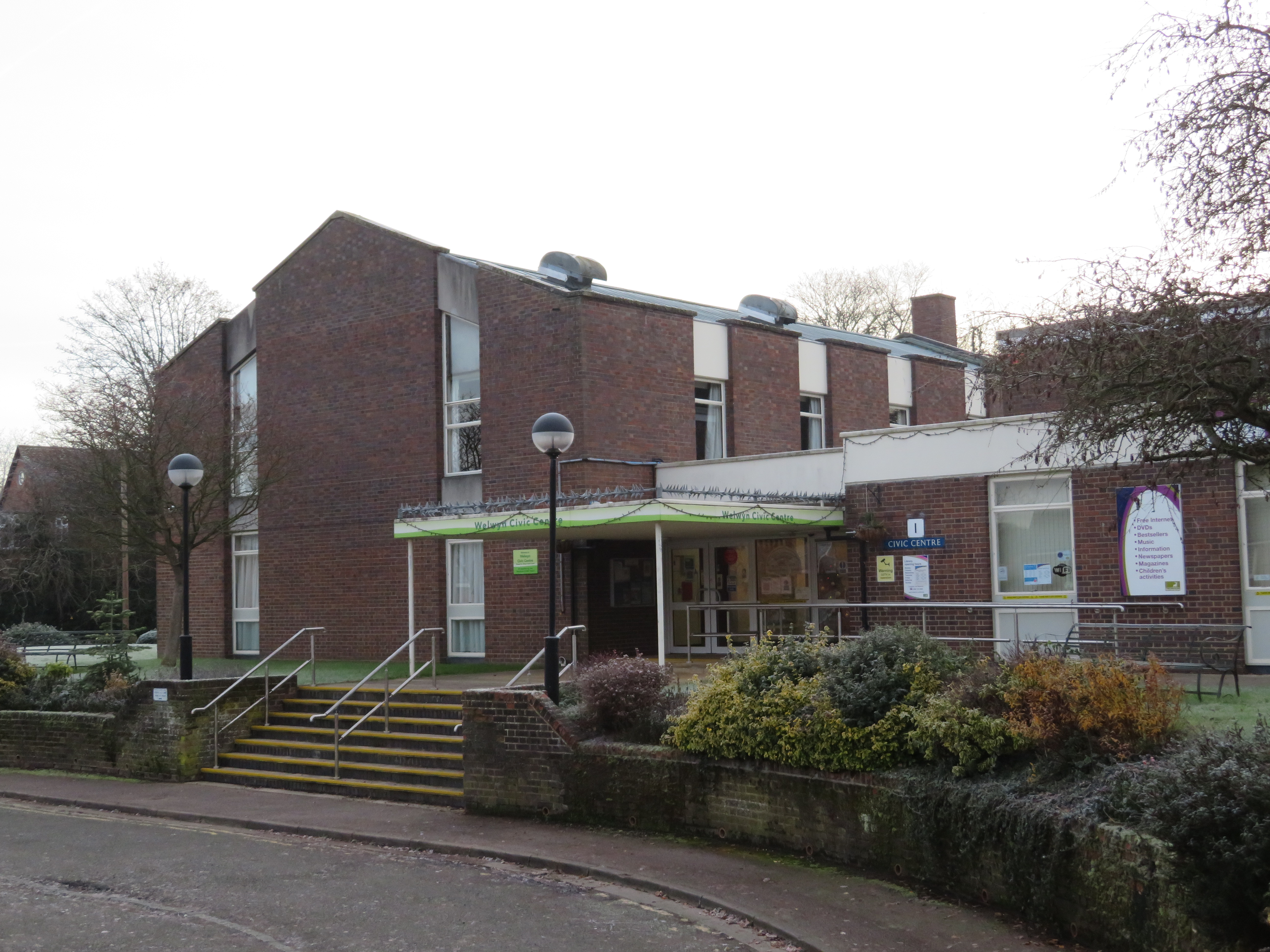
Welwyn Civic Centre, built c. 1966 by Welwyn Rural District Council.

The council then moved into the old isolation hospital, which was down a long track behind the workhouse. When the Welwyn Bypass was built in the mid-1920s it went between the built-up area of Welwyn village and the council's offices in the old isolation hospital. These offices were not particularly popular with the councillors or staff of the council. As well as being inconveniently cut off from Welwyn village by the bypass, the old hospital building was a corrugated iron hut dating back to the 1890s, which was uncomfortably hot in summer, cold in winter, and barely had enough room for the whole council to meet. Plans in the 1930s to build a new council office in the village itself or to purchase an old house there did not come to anything.

Eventually the council built a new civic centre at Prospect Place in the village, which opened in April 1966. The site of the old isolation hospital also continued to serve as offices for the council until its abolition in 1974.

== Abolition ==
Welwyn Rural District was abolished under the Local Government Act 1972, becoming part of the district of Welwyn Hatfield on 1 April 1974.
