= Broadwater (hundred) =

Broadwater was a judicial and taxation subdivision (a "hundred") of Hertfordshire, in the northeast of the county, that existed from the 10th to the 19th century.

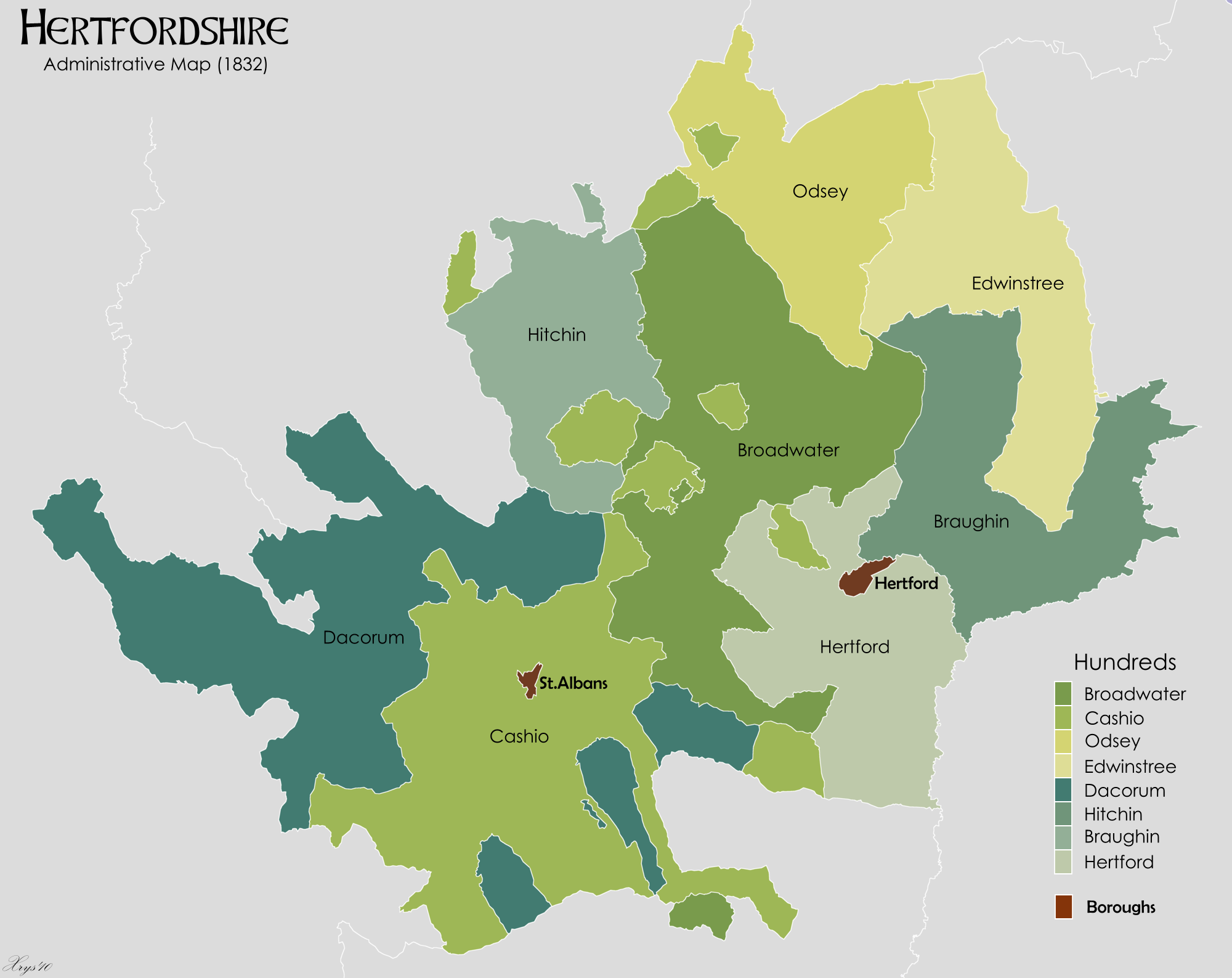
Odsey Hundred in 1832

It comprised the following parishes: Aston, Ayot St. Lawrence, Ayot St Peter, Baldock, Benington, Datchworth, Digswell, Graveley, Hatfield, Knebworth, Letchworth, Great Munden, Little Munden, Sacombe, Stevenage, Walkern, Watton-at-Stone, Welwyn, Weston, Willian, Great Wymondley and Little Wymondley. Totteridge, Middlesex, was included as a detached part of the parish of Hatfield.

The hundred originally also included Shephall, Norton and Codicote which were owned by St Alban's Abbey, who arranged in the 13th century to transfer them to their own hundred of Cashio and the hamlets of Langley with Minsden and Almshoe which were later transferred to Hitchin.

The hundred was named after a settlement on the border of Knebworth and Shephall parishes - now a district within Stevenage new town. The hundred was owned by the King.

Haslam proposes that the hundred was originally part of a larger "proto-hundred" which comprised the five East Hertfordshire hundreds of Braughing, Edwinstree, Odsey, Broadwater and Hertford; this territory was originally created to support the two Burhs at Hertford, on opposite banks of the River Lea, built by King Edward the Elder in 913 to defend against the Danes. The interlocking nature of Braughing and Edwinstree hundreds is taken as evidence that they were originally part of a single unit that was later subdivided into hundreds.
