= Nasty, Hertfordshire =

Hamlet in Hertfordshire, England

Coordinates: 51.903°N 0.025°W

Nasty
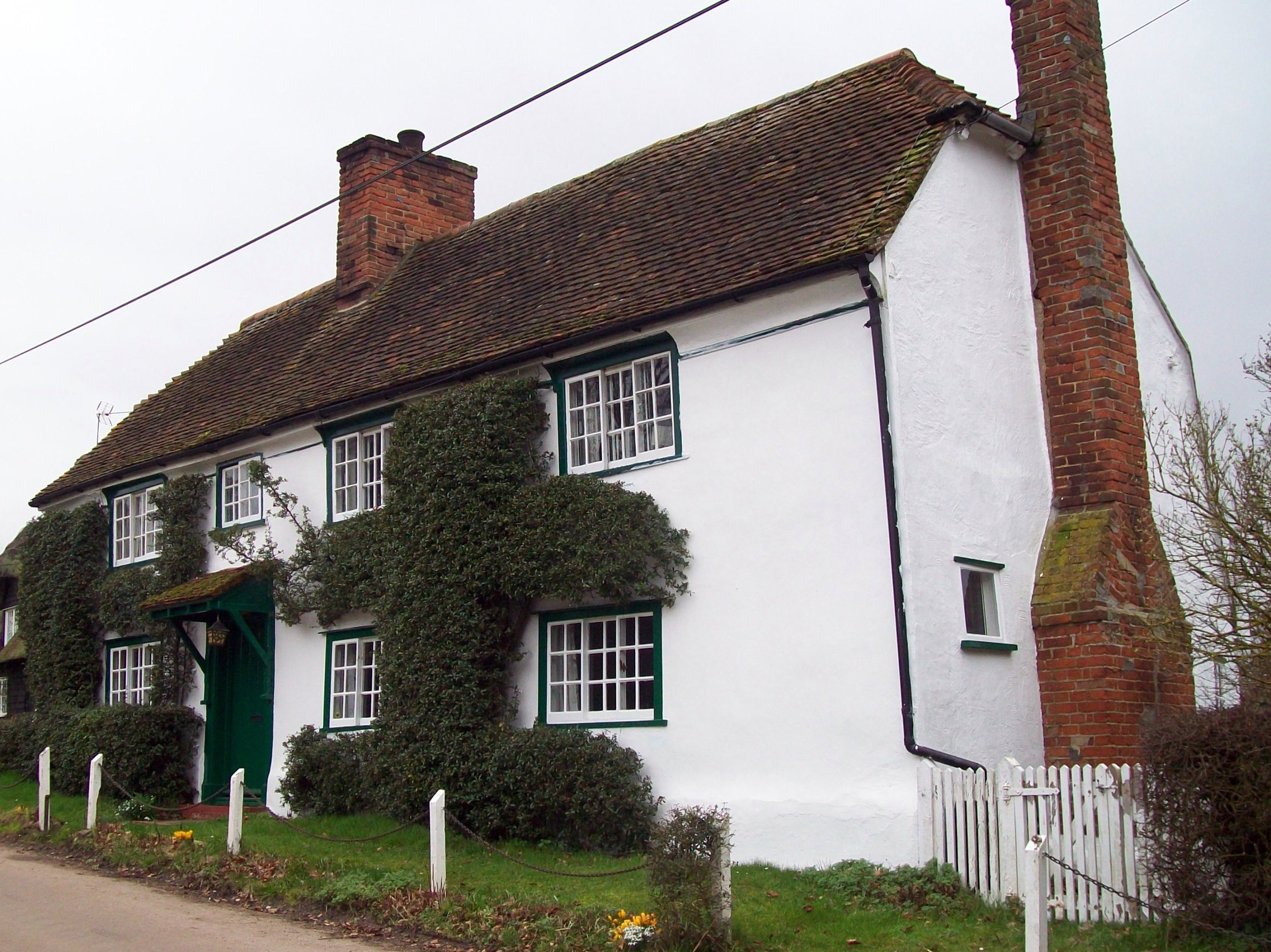
- Steen Cottage in Nasty

- Location within Hertfordshire
- OS grid reference: TL360246
- Civil parish: Great Munden
- District: East Hertfordshire
- Shire county: Hertfordshire
- Region: East
- Country: England
- Sovereign state: United Kingdom
- Post town: WARE
- Postcode district: SG11
- Dialling code: 01920

Nasty is a hamlet in the East Hertfordshire district of Hertfordshire, England. It is in Great Munden civil parish, around 6 miles (10 km) north of Ware and around 7.5 miles (12 km) east of Stevenage. At the 2011 census the population was included in the civil parish of Albury.

Its name comes from the Middle English atten ast hey, meaning "at the eastern enclosure".
