= Watford Rural =

Civil parish in Hertfordshire, England

Coordinates: 51.626°N 0.388°W

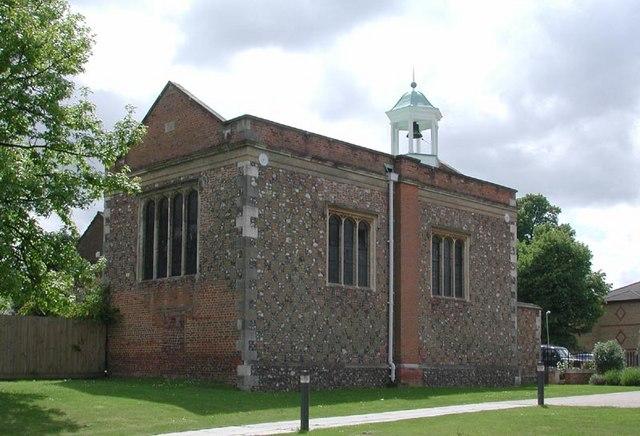
- Oxhey Chapel

- Location within Hertfordshire
- Interactive map of Watford Rural
- Area: 3.15 sq mi (8.2 km^{2})
- Population: 20,867 (2011 Census)
  - Density: 6,624/sq mi (2,558/km^{2})
- OS grid reference: TQ116931
  - London: 14 mi (23 km) SE
- Civil parish: Watford Rural
- District: Three Rivers
- Shire county: Hertfordshire
- Region: East
- Country: England
- Sovereign state: United Kingdom
- Post town: WATFORD
- Postcode district: WD19
- Dialling code: 020; 01923
- Police: Hertfordshire
- Fire: Hertfordshire
- Ambulance: East of England
- UK Parliament: South West Hertfordshire; Watford
- Website: Watford Rural Parish Council

Watford Rural is a civil parish in the Three Rivers District of Hertfordshire, England. Located approximately 14 miles (23 km) northwest of central London and adjacent to the Greater London boundary, it is an urbanised parish characterised by suburban residential development. The local council is Watford Rural Parish Council. The parish covers South Oxhey and Carpenders Park, which although part of the Watford urban area, are outside the borough of Watford. The parish was created in 1894 when the ancient Watford parish was split into urban and rural parishes. At the 2011 census it had a population of 20,867.

== History ==
The ancient parish of Watford covered an extensive rural area as well as the town itself. The Watford Local Board District was created in 1850 covering the built-up area of the town, but the local board district did not cover the whole parish of Watford. Under the Local Government Act 1894, local board districts became urban districts, and parishes which were part inside and part outside an urban district, such as Watford, had to be split into separate parishes. The parts of the old parish of Watford outside the urban district therefore became the parish of Watford Rural. The first parish meeting for Watford Rural was held on 4 December 1894 at the courthouse on King Street in Watford. The first parish council was chosen by a show of hands at that meeting without a formal election being required. The first meeting of the parish council was then held on 18 December 1894 at Upton House in Watford, which was the offices of the Watford Local Board at the time, and Edward Villiers, 5th Earl of Clarendon was appointed the first chairman of the parish council. Watford Rural parish was then included in the similarly named but larger Watford Rural District, which came into being on 28 December 1894.

When first created, Watford Rural parish covered areas to the north, west and south of Watford, including Chandler's Cross and Garston as well as the South Oxhey area. The parish ceded territory on several occasions to Watford Urban District (Municipal Borough after 1922) and to the adjoining parishes of Abbots Langley, Aldenham, Rickmansworth, and Sarratt. After boundary changes in 1952 the parish was left just covering the area around South Oxhey and Carpender's Park to the south of Watford.

The parish was part of the review area of the Royal Commission on Local Government in Greater London, however it did not form part of the proposed Greater London area because it was felt the parish and southern Hertfordshire looked to Watford more than to London. It then became part of Three Rivers district in 1974 under the Local Government Act 1972.

== Governance ==
There are three tiers of local government covering Watford Rural, at parish, district, and county level: Watford Rural Parish Council, Three Rivers District Council, and Hertfordshire County Council.

Watford Rural Parish Council has offices located on Oxhey Drive. The parish has fourteen councillors. It is divided into the five wards of Ashridge (electing councillor), Carpenders Park (4 councillors), Hayling (2 councillors), South Oxhey (5 councillors) and Oxhey Hall (2 councillors). The parish clerk is Gareth Williams.

== Geography ==
The civil parish is 816 hectares (3.15 sq mi). It is located approximately 14 miles (23 km) northwest of central London and is adjacent to the Greater London boundary to the south. It is predominantly urbanised, with residential development. There is parkland, woodland and some farmland throughout the parish and especially towards the northwest, falling within the Metropolitan Green Belt. The parish includes the settlements of Carpenders Park and South Oxhey. The London—Watford railway line divides the settlements, with Carpenders Park in the east and South Oxhey to the west. For postal addresses, the parish is within the WD19 postcode district of the Watford post town.

== Demography ==
Despite its name it is largely urbanised, with a population of 20,867 according to the 2011 census.

== Freedom of the Parish ==
The following people and military units have received the Freedom of the Parish of Watford Rural.

=== Individuals ===
- Pamela "Pam" King: 17 July 2023.
