= Dane End =

Hamlet in Hertfordshire, England

Coordinates: 51.875°N 0.065°W

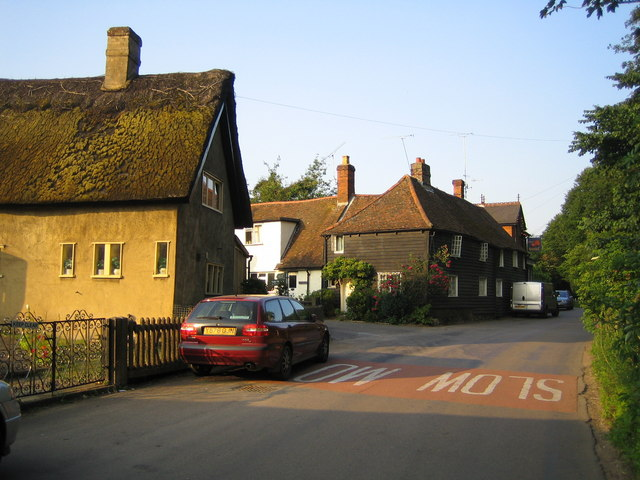
- Munden Road, Dane End

- Location within Hertfordshire
- Population: 700
- OS grid reference: TL333213
- Civil parish: Little Munden
- District: East Hertfordshire
- Shire county: Hertfordshire
- Region: East
- Country: England
- Sovereign state: United Kingdom
- Post town: Ware
- Postcode district: SG12
- Dialling code: 01920
- Police: Hertfordshire
- Fire: Hertfordshire
- Ambulance: East of England

Dane End is a hamlet to the north of Ware in Hertfordshire, England situated between the A602 and A10. It is within Little Munden civil parish and East Hertfordshire District Council. It has a population of around 700. Dane End means the 'valley ends' and is located where a tributary of the River Lea comes off the surrounding chalk. Little Munden church and school are sited on the hill on the north side of Dane End.

== Little Munden Primary School ==
Little Munden School is a Church of England voluntary controlled primary school. It was founded in 1819 at All Saints Church by the Reverend J P Reynolds, who served as rector from 1819 to 1831. The school was designated as a Grade II listed building by English Heritage in 1984 as an early example of a parish school.

== Sport ==
The Little Munden Cricket Club plays at nearby Green End in the Cricket Meadow. The Club fields a Saturday team and is currently in the Herts & Essex Borders League, Division 3. The ground retains a small wooden pavilion built in 1922 and opened by Lord Gladstone who lived in Dane End and was a keen cricketer. Outside of the Cricket Season the ground is used for sheep grazing.

Football club Dane End United formerly played in the East Hertfordshire Corinthians League, a local Sunday football league, as well as Ware and District five-a-side league. The club played its home games in Horses Meadow. The Vlub is no longer active but football goals remain in Horses Meadow

== Local Business ==
Convenience store Dane End Stores is located in Dane End. The Dane End Christmas Tree Farm sells a range of Christmas trees and Christmas-themed goods all time of year, providing trees for events other than Christmas. An example of a different event includes selling pumpkins at Halloween. The hamlet's only pub is The Boot, a gastropub. However the Boot has recently been shutdown and is now being converted into a nursery.
