= Clothall =

Village in Hertfordshire, England

Coordinates: 51°58′N 0°09′W

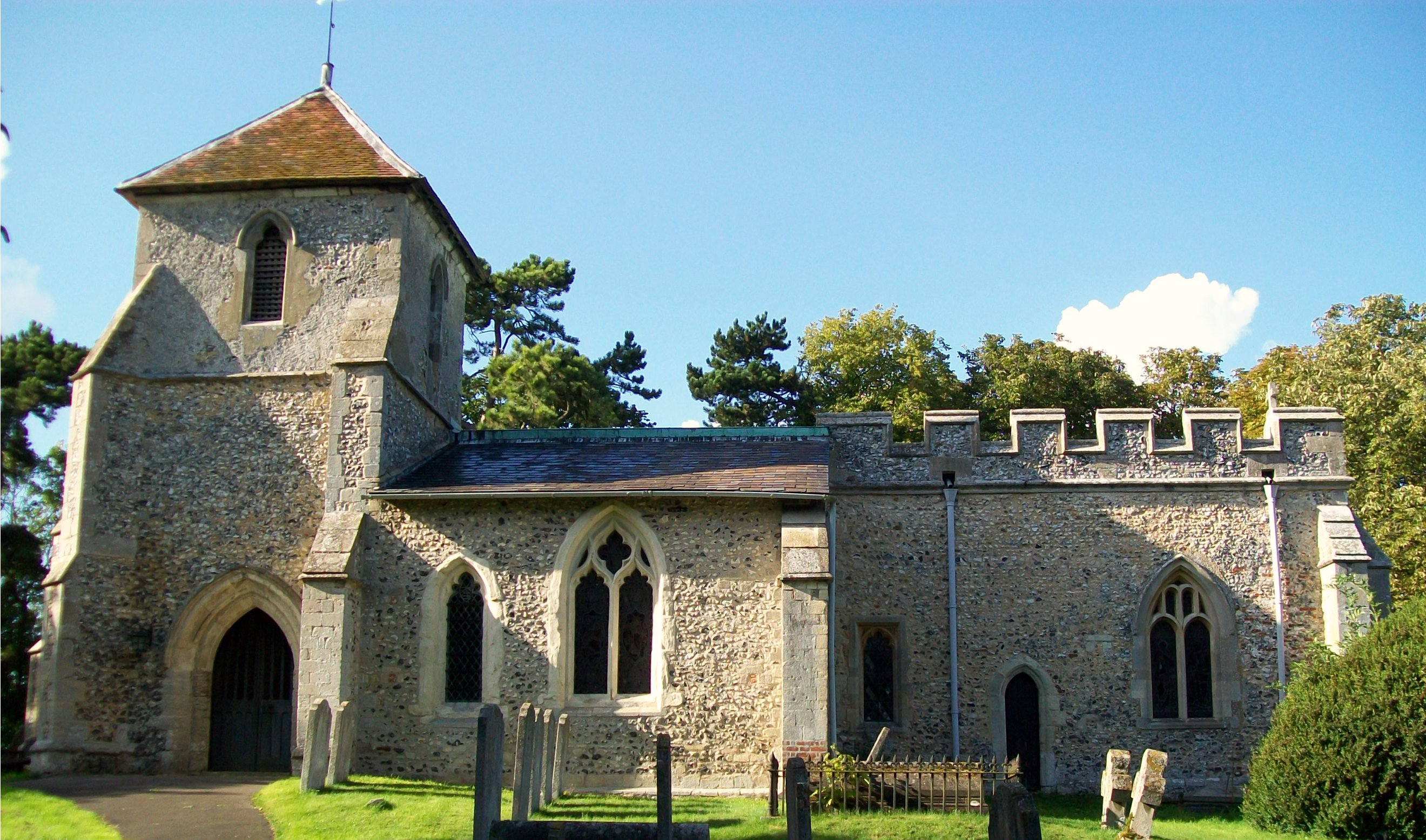
- Church of St Mary the Virgin, Clothall

- Location within Hertfordshire
- Population: 155 (Parish, 2021)
- Civil parish: Clothall
- District: North Hertfordshire
- Shire county: Hertfordshire
- Region: East
- Country: England
- Sovereign state: United Kingdom
- Post town: Baldock
- Postcode district: SG7

Clothall is a village and civil parish in the North Hertfordshire district of Hertfordshire, England. The small village stands on a ridge of high ground 2 miles (3 km) south-east of Baldock. The parish extends from the fringes of Baldock in the north to the hamlet of Luffenhall in the south. At the 2021 census, the parish had a population of 155.

== History ==
Clothall is recorded in the Domesday Book of 1086 with four principal landholders: Odo of Bayeux, Count Alan, William de Ow, and Hardwin de Scalers.

The parish church of St Mary the Virgin was built of flint and stone around 1350–70. though parts of the church are older, dating to the 12th century.

== Governance ==
There are two elected tiers of local government covering Clothall, at district and county level: North Hertfordshire District Council and Hertfordshire County Council.

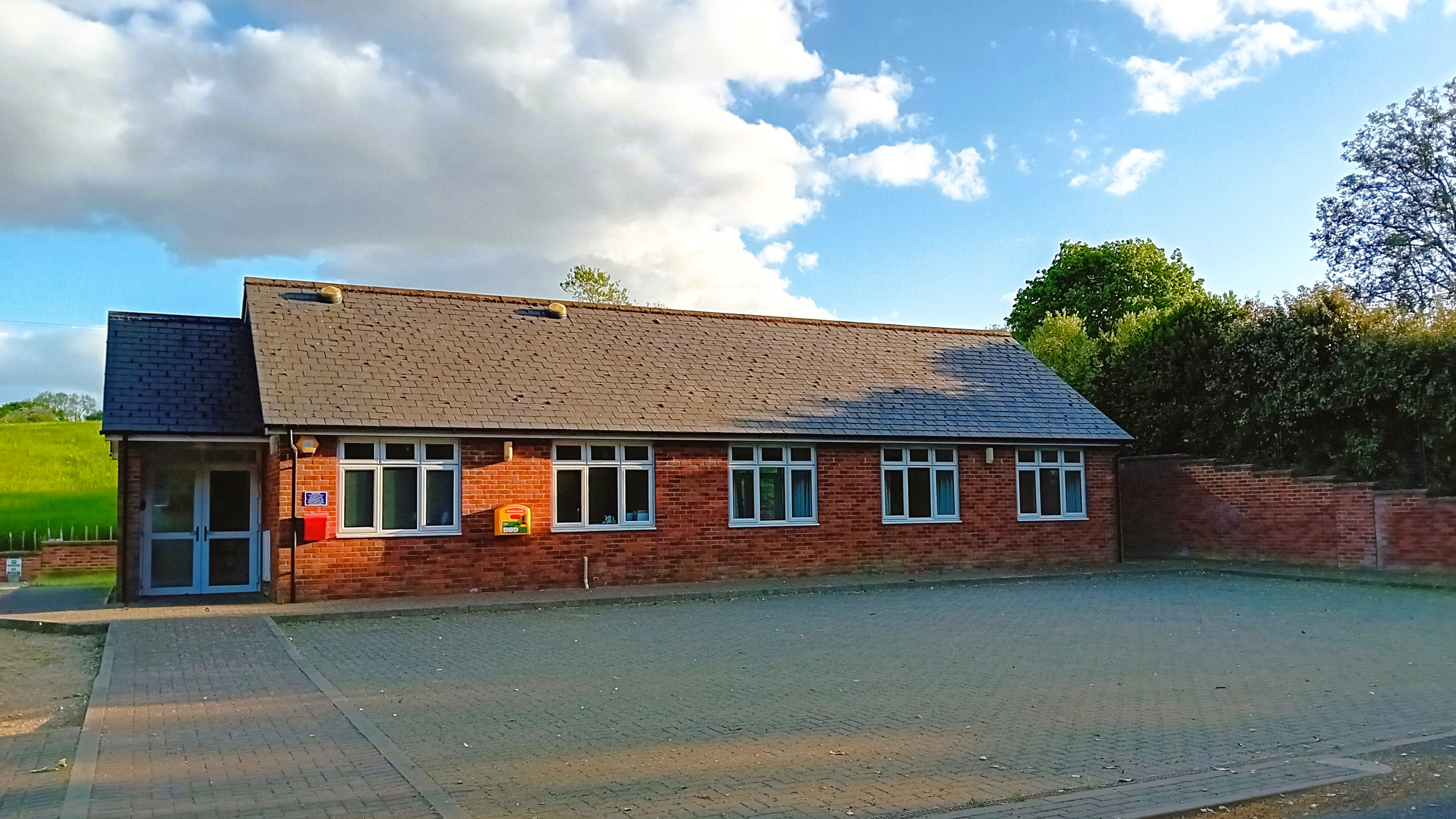
Clothall Village Hall

Due to its low population, Clothall has a parish meeting comprising all residents instead of an elected parish council. Although the name of the parish is just Clothall, the district council refers to the parish meeting as "Clothall and Luffenhall Parish Meeting". Parish meetings are held at the village hall on Ashanger Lane.

The parish historically included an area of common land lying immediately east of Baldock. This area was developed in the 1980s as the Clothall Common housing estate; it was removed from Clothall parish in 1985.

== Notable people ==
- Thomas Stanley (1625–1678) was baptised at Clothall and lived at Cumberlow Manor, which was at the south-eastern end of Clothall parish, near the boundary with Rushden.

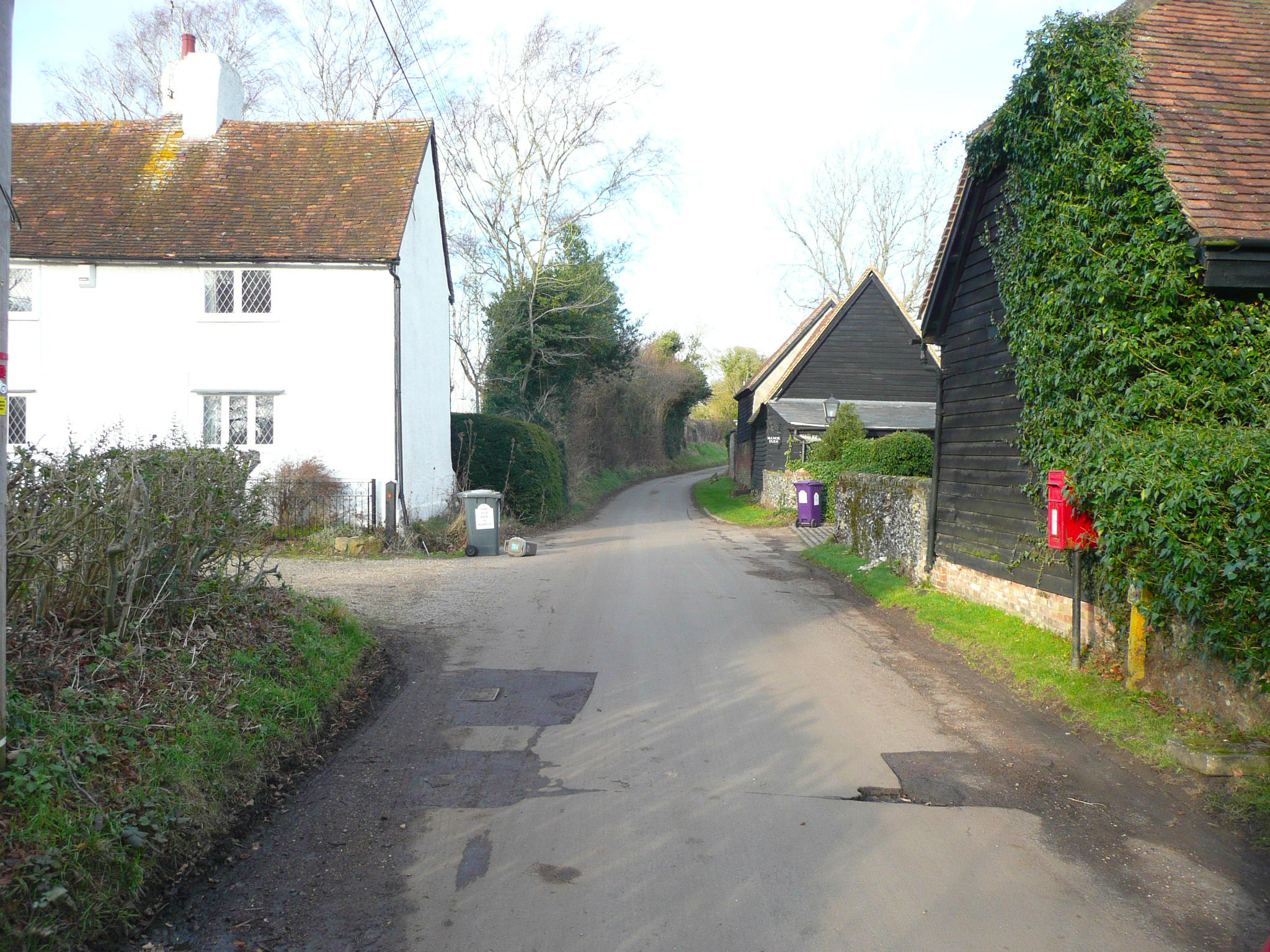
Buildings in the hamlet of Luffenhall at the southern end of the parish
