= Great Munden =

Village and civil parish in Hertfordshire, England

Coordinates: 51.898°N 0.028°W

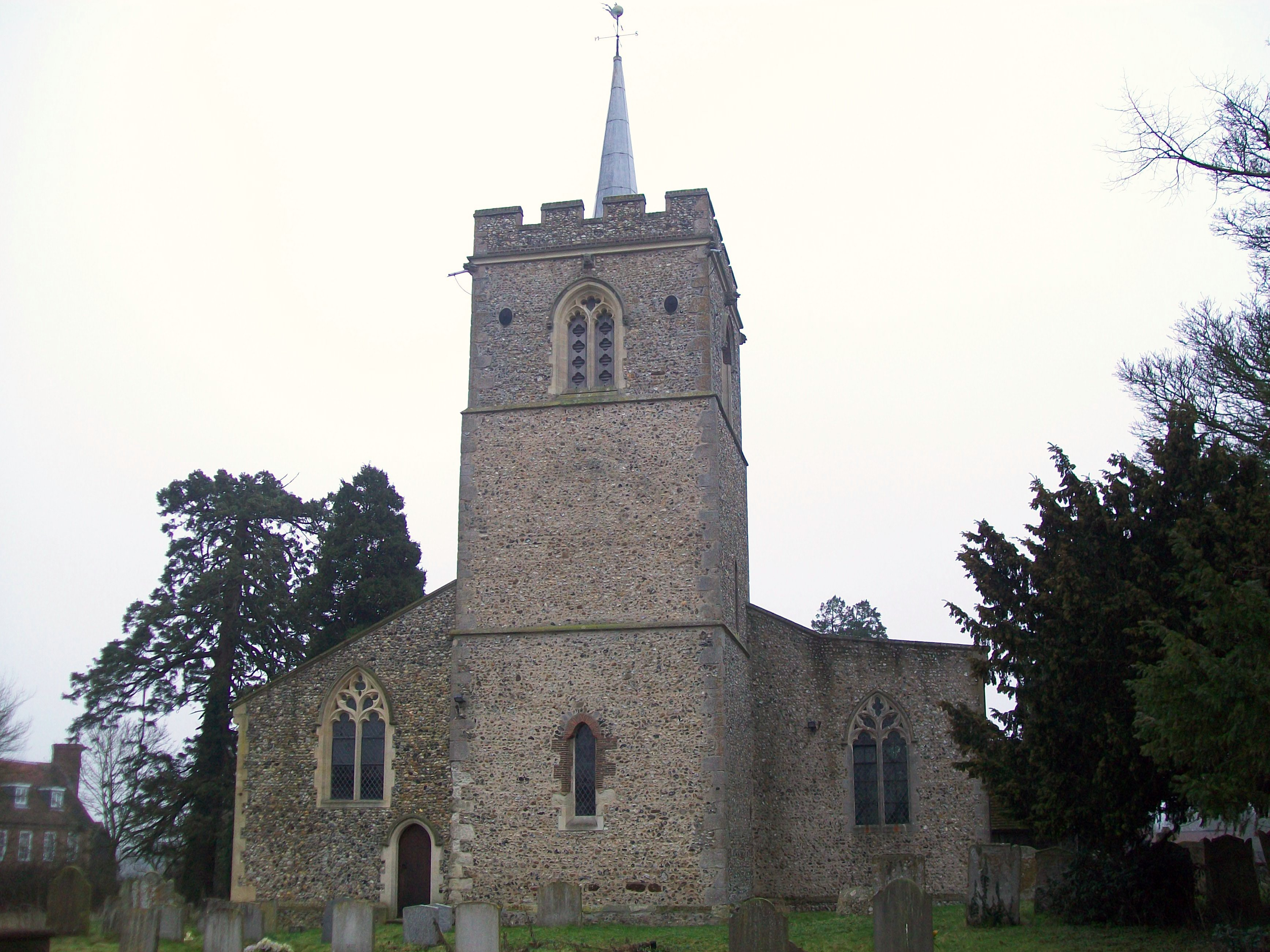
- Parish church of St Nicholas

- Location within Hertfordshire
- Population: 358 (Parish, 2021)
- Civil parish: Great Munden
- District: East Hertfordshire
- Shire county: Hertfordshire
- Region: East
- Country: England
- Sovereign state: United Kingdom
- Post town: WARE
- Postcode district: SG11
- UK Parliament: North East Hertfordshire

Great Munden is a village and civil parish in the East Hertfordshire district of Hertfordshire, England. The village lies 6 miles (10 km) north of Ware, its post town. As well as the small village of Great Munden itself, the parish also covers surrounding rural areas including the hamlets of Nasty and Levens Green. At the 2021 census the parish had a population of 358.

== History ==
In the Domesday Book of 1086 there were two estates or manors listed at the vill of Mundene in the Broadwater hundred of Hertfordshire. The Domesday Book does not otherwise distinguish between the two Munden manors by name, but the manor owned by Count Alan of Brittany later became known as Great Munden or Munden Furnival. The manor owned in 1086 by Walter of Flanders was later known as Little Munden or Munden Frevil.

At the time of the Domesday Book, a priest was listed at Little Munden, suggesting it was by then a parish, but no priest was listed at Great Munden, despite it then being the more populous manor, having 25 households in 1086 compared to Little Munden's 17 households. Great Munden subsequently also became a parish. Its parish church, dedicated to St Nicholas, was built in the early 12th century. The church was likely built at the expense of the lord of the manor of Great Munden; it stands adjoining Mundenbury, the manor house of Great Munden, and the lords of the manor retained the advowson (the right to nominate new priests when vacancies arose).

The manorial complex at Mundenbury includes an aisled barn which dates back to the 13th or 14th century. The manor house itself was largely rebuilt in 1700, although incorporating some parts from an earlier house.

In 1912, the parish was described as covering 3,758 acres (5.872 sq mi), of which 1,895.75 acres (2.96211 sq mi) were arable land, 927.5 acres (1.4492 sq mi) were permanent grass, and 97 acres (0.152 sq mi) were woodland. The parishes of Great Munden and Little Munden each had detached exclaves within the territory of the other, reflecting their ancient origin as a single territory. The exclaves were eliminated with boundary changes in 1888.

== Governance ==
There are three tiers of local government covering Great Munden, at parish, district, and county level: Great Munden Parish Council, East Hertfordshire District Council, and Hertfordshire County Council. The parish council meets at St Nicholas's Church.

== See also ==
- List of civil parishes in Hertfordshire
- List of places in Hertfordshire
