= Hatfield Rural District =

Rural district in Hertfordshire, England

Coordinates: 51.76537°N 0.22014°W

- Rural district
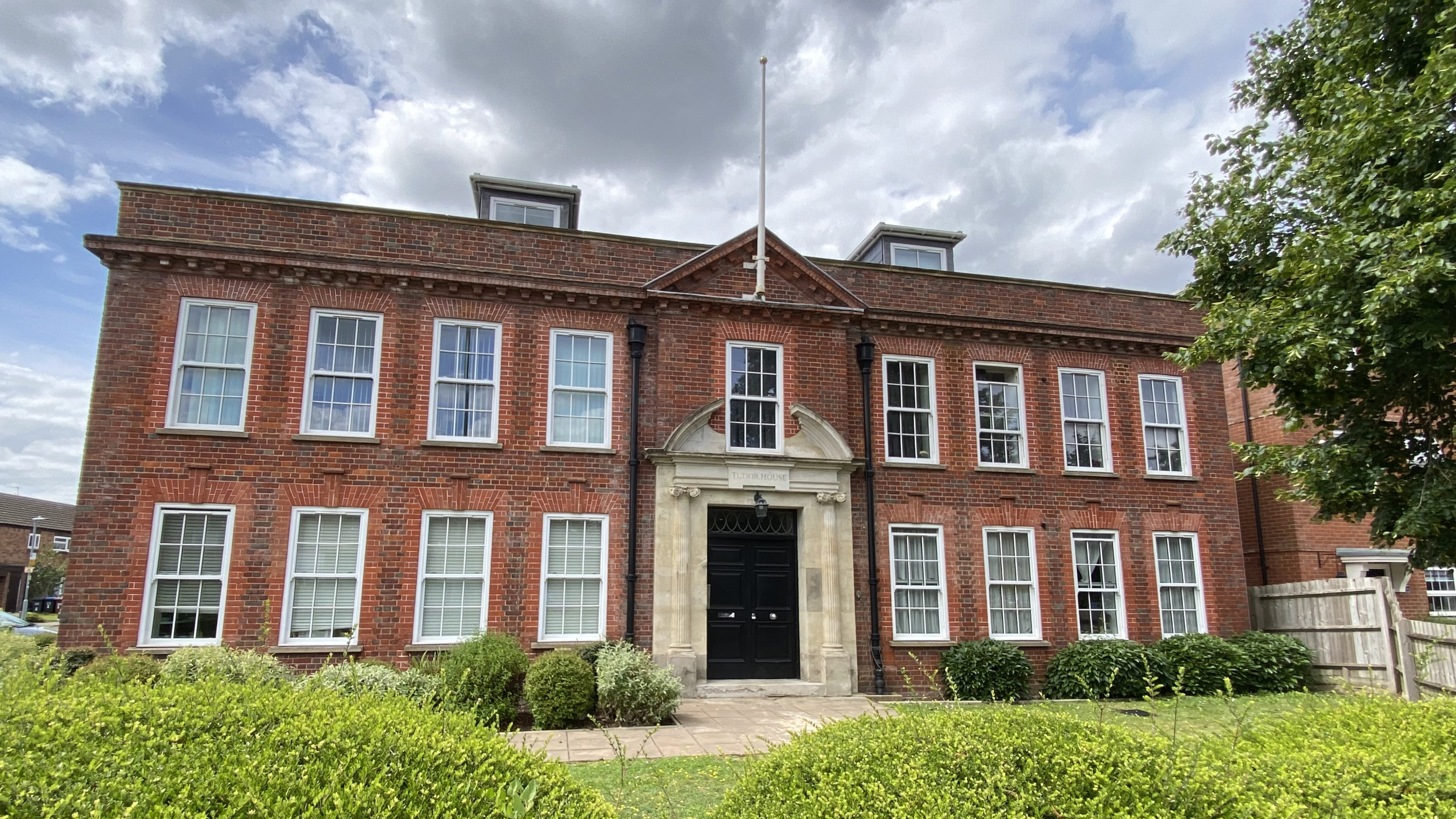
- Council Offices: 16 St Albans Road, Hatfield

Coat of arms
- Population
  - 1901: 7,551
  - 1971: 43,325
- History
  - Created: 28 December 1894
  - Abolished: 31 March 1974
  - Succeeded by: Welwyn Hatfield
  - HQ: Hatfield
- Contained within
  - County Council: Hertfordshire

Hatfield Rural District was a rural district in Hertfordshire, England, from 1894 to 1974, covering an area in the south of the county.

== Evolution ==
The district had its origins in the Hatfield Rural Sanitary District. This had been created under the Public Health Acts of 1872 and 1875, giving public health and local government responsibilities for rural areas to the existing boards of guardians of poor law unions. The Hatfield Rural Sanitary District covered the same area as the Hatfield Poor Law Union. Under the Local Government Act 1894, rural sanitary districts became rural districts from 28 December 1894. The link with the poor law union continued, with all the elected councillors of the rural district council being ex officio members of the Hatfield Board of Guardians. As there were no urban districts within the Hatfield Poor Law Union, the Hatfield Rural District Council and the Hatfield Board of Guardians were the same group of people.

The council was granted a coat of arms on 11 May 1945.

== Parishes ==
Hatfield Rural District contained the following civil parishes.

Parish	From	To	Notes
Essendon	28 Dec 1894	31 Mar 1974	
Hatfield	28 Dec 1894	31 Mar 1974	Officially called "Bishops Hatfield" until 1 October 1951.
Northaw	28 Dec 1894	31 Mar 1974	
North Mymms	28 Dec 1894	31 Mar 1974	

== Premises ==
In the early years, the Hatfield Rural District Council met at the board room in the Hatfield Union Workhouse, which stood on Wellfield Road (then called Union Lane). In 1930 the council moved to purpose-built offices at 16 St Albans Road in Hatfield, designed by Percival Blow.

== Abolition ==
Hatfield Rural District was abolished under the Local Government Act 1972, merging with Welwyn Rural District and the urban district of Welwyn Garden City to form the new district of Welwyn Hatfield. The council's former offices at 16 St Albans Road continued to be used by the new council for some years, before being converted to flats and renamed Tudor House around 2011.
