= Watford Rural District =

Former local government district in Hertfordshire, United Kingdom

Coordinates: 51.667°N 0.397°W

- Rural district
- Population
  - 1911: 17,776
  - 1971: 50,275
- History
  - Created: 28 December 1894
  - Abolished: 31 March 1974
  - Succeeded by: Three Rivers; Hertsmere; Dacorum
  - HQ: Watford
- Contained within
  - County Council: Hertfordshire

Watford Rural District was a rural district in Hertfordshire from 1894 to 1974. It initially surrounded but did not include the town of Watford, which was a separate urban district. It gradually ceded territory to other districts, and by the time of its abolition in 1974 the district comprised three separate pieces of land, lying to the north-west, north-east, and south of Watford.

== Evolution ==
Watford Poor Law Union had been created in 1835 following the Poor Law Amendment Act 1834. Under the Public Health Act 1872 sanitary districts were created, and the boards of guardians of poor law unions were made responsible for public health and local government for any part of their district not included in an urban authority. The Watford Rural Sanitary District therefore covered the area of the Watford Poor Law Union except for the town of Watford, which had a local board.

Under the Local Government Act 1894, rural sanitary districts became rural districts from 28 December 1894. Several parts of Watford Rural District were later removed from it by the creation of new urban districts: Rickmansworth in 1898, Bushey in 1906, and Chorleywood in 1913. The district also ceded territory to Watford itself on several occasions.

== Parishes ==
Watford Rural District contained the following civil parishes:

Parish	From	To	Notes
Abbots Langley	28 Dec 1894	31 Mar 1974	
Aldenham	28 Dec 1894	31 Mar 1974	
Bushey Rural	28 Dec 1894	31 Mar 1906	Parish created 4 December 1894 from that part of former Bushey parish not within Watford Local Board District. Converted to an urban district and renamed Bushey on 1 April 1906.
Chorleywood	15 Apr 1898	31 Mar 1913	Parish created from part of Rickmansworth. Converted to an urban district on 1 April 1913.
Rickmansworth	28 Dec 1894	14 Apr 1898	Converted to an urban district on 15 April 1898, except for parts which became Chorleywood and Rickmansworth Rural parishes.
Rickmansworth Rural	15 Apr 1898	31 Mar 1935	Parish created from part of Rickmansworth. Abolished and split between Rickmansworth and Sarratt on 1 April 1935.
Sarratt	28 Dec 1894	31 Mar 1974	
Watford Rural	28 Dec 1894	31 Mar 1974	Parish created 4 December 1894 from that part of former Watford parish not within Watford Local Board District.

== Premises ==
Until 1904 the council held its meetings at the Watford Union Workhouse at 60 Vicarage Road (which later became Watford General Hospital). From 1904 the council met instead at Watford Place at 27 King Street, which was the office of the solicitor who acted as clerk to the council. Other office functions were carried out at various addresses within Watford, including 9 Market Street (from at least 1901 to 1930), 7 Church Street (1930 to 1937) and 25 King Street, immediately adjoining Watford Place (1932 to 1947). In 1947 the council consolidated its offices and meeting place at Wynyard House, 99 Langley Road, Watford, a large house which had previously been Wynyard School, a boarding school. The council remained at Wynyard House until its abolition.

== Abolition ==
Under the Local Government Act 1972 the Watford Rural District was abolished in 1974; its territory was split, with the parish of Aldenham going to Hertsmere, the part of Abbots Langley within the designated area of Hemel Hempstead New Town going to Dacorum, and the remainder to Three Rivers.

== See also ==
Local government in England
