= Sacombe =

Village in Hertfordshire, England

Coordinates: 51.858°N 0.068°W

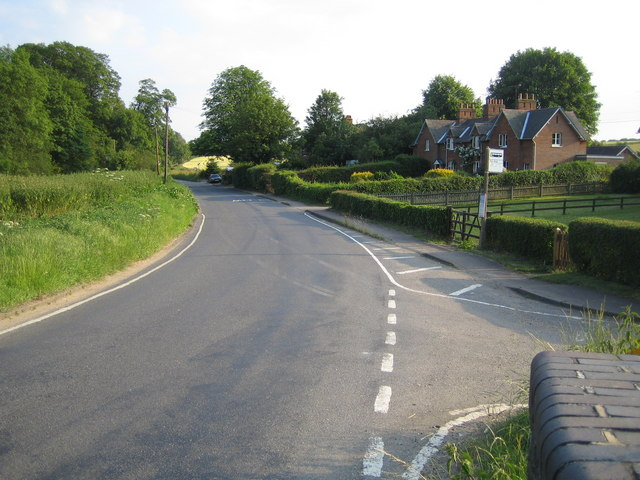
- Sacombe

- Location within Hertfordshire
- Population: 178 (Parish, 2021)
- OS grid reference: TL332196
- Civil parish: Sacombe
- District: East Hertfordshire
- Shire county: Hertfordshire
- Region: East
- Country: England
- Sovereign state: United Kingdom
- Post town: WARE
- Postcode district: SG12
- Dialling code: 01920
- Police: Hertfordshire
- Fire: Hertfordshire
- Ambulance: East of England
- UK Parliament: North East Hertfordshire

Sacombe is a village and civil parish in the East Hertfordshire district of Hertfordshire, England. It lies is located about 4 miles (6 km) north-north-west of Ware, its post town. As well as the small village of Sacombe itself, the parish also covers surrounding rural areas, including the hamlet of Sacombe Green. At the 2021 census the parish had a population of 178.

Sacombe was an ancient parish in the Broadwater hundred of Hertfordshire.

== Religious sites ==
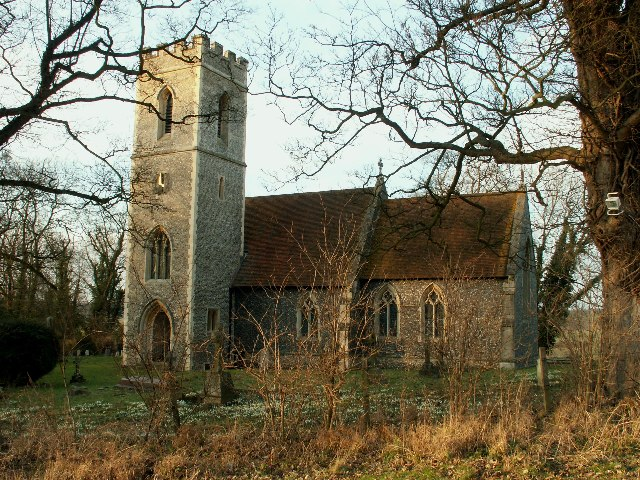
St. Catherine's Church

There appears to have been a church in the parish in 1086, which may have been dedicated to St Mary. The present Anglican Church of St Catherine is largely 14th Century, but was restored in 1855/56, the work being funded by Abel Smith of Woodhall Park. The building is faced with knapped flint and has a four-stage tower. It is a Grade II* listed building

The parish of Sacombe is the smallest in the Diocese of St Albans, and forms part of the benefice of Standon and The Mundens with Sacombe, with worship shared between St Catherine's and churches at Little Munden and Standon. The church was used as a location for the 2001 film Enigma based on the book of the same name by Robert Harris about the codebreakers of Bletchley Park in World War II.
