= St Albans Rural District =

Former local government area in the UK

Coordinates: 51.752°N 0.336°W

- Rural district
- Area
  - 1911: 38,772 acres (156.90 km^{2})
  - 1931: 37,070 acres (150.0 km^{2})
  - 1961: 31,793 acres (128.66 km^{2})
- Population
  - 1901: 12,264
  - 1931: 19,578
  - 1971: 39,370
- History
  - Origin: sanitary district
  - Created: 28 December 1894
  - Abolished: 31 March 1974
  - Succeeded by: St Albans; Dacorum
- Government: St Albans Rural District Council
  - HQ: St Albans
  - Motto: Exemplio sint virtutis
- Subdivisions
  - Type: civil parishes

St Albans Rural District was a rural district in the administrative county of Hertfordshire, England from 1894 to 1974. It surrounded but did not include the city of St Albans.

== Evolution ==
St Albans Poor Law Union had been created in 1835 following the Poor Law Amendment Act 1834. A workhouse was built on Normandy Road (then called Union Lane) in 1837–1837. Under the Public Health Act 1872 sanitary districts were created, and the boards of guardians of poor law unions were made responsible for public health and local government for any part of their district not included in an urban authority. The St Albans Rural Sanitary District therefore covered the area of the St Albans Poor Law Union except for the town of St Albans, which was a municipal borough.

Under the Local Government Act 1894, rural sanitary districts became rural districts from 28 December 1894. An urban district of Harpenden was created in 1898, removing it from the rural district.

The council was granted a coat of arms on 10 August 1954.

== Parishes ==
The rural district initially consisted of seven civil parishes. Three of these parishes were also formed in December 1894 by the division of the old parishes of St Michael, St Peter, and Sandridge, which had all previously straddled the rural sanitary district and the city of St Albans.

Parish	From	To	Notes
Colney Heath	15 Apr 1947	31 Mar 1974	Created on abolition of St Peter Rural.
Harpenden	28 Dec 1894	14 Apr 1898	Split into Harpenden Rural and Harpenden Urban on creation of Harpenden Urban District.
Harpenden Rural	15 Apr 1898	31 Mar 1974	Created from that part of old Harpenden parish not transferred to Harpenden Urban District.
London Colney	15 Apr 1947	31 Mar 1974	Created on abolition of St Peter Rural.
Redbourn	28 Dec 1894	31 Mar 1974	
Sandridge Rural	28 Dec 1894	1957	Parish created December 1894 from that part of Sandridge outside the borough of St Albans. Parish renamed Sandridge in 1957.
Sandridge	1957	31 Mar 1974	Renaming of Sandridge Rural.
St Michael Rural	28 Dec 1894	31 Mar 1974	
St Peter Rural	28 Dec 1894	14 Apr 1947	Parish created December 1894 from that part of parish of St Peter outside the borough of St Albans. Parish abolished 1947 to create two new parishes of London Colney and Colney Heath.
St Stephen	28 Dec 1894	31 Mar 1974	
Wheathampstead	28 Dec 1894	31 Mar 1974	

== Premises ==
The link with the poor law union continued, with all the elected councillors of the rural district council being ex officio members of the St Albans Board of Guardians. St Albans Rural District Council held its first meeting on 10 January 1895 at the board room of the St Albans Union Workhouse, immediately following a meeting of the guardians. Henry Joseph Toulmin was appointed the first chairman of the district council; he was also the chairman of the board of guardians. From April 1895 onwards the council held its meetings at St Albans Town Hall. The council continued to meet at Town Hall until the 1920s, with administrative office functions carried out at various premises in St Albans. In 1929 the council moved to a large house at 43 Upper Lattimore Road in St Albans, which was converted to serve as the council's offices and meeting place. The council remained at 43 Upper Lattimore Road until its abolition.

== Abolition ==
St Albans Rural district was abolished on 1 April 1974 under the Local Government Act 1972. The majority of its area was included in the non-metropolitan district of St Albans City and District, with the exception of small parts that went to Dacorum, being the parts of the parishes of Redbourn and St Michael Rural that were within the designated area of Hemel Hempstead New Town.
