= Oaklands, Hertfordshire =

Hamlet in Hertfordshire, England

Coordinates: 51.842°N 0.194°W

Oaklands
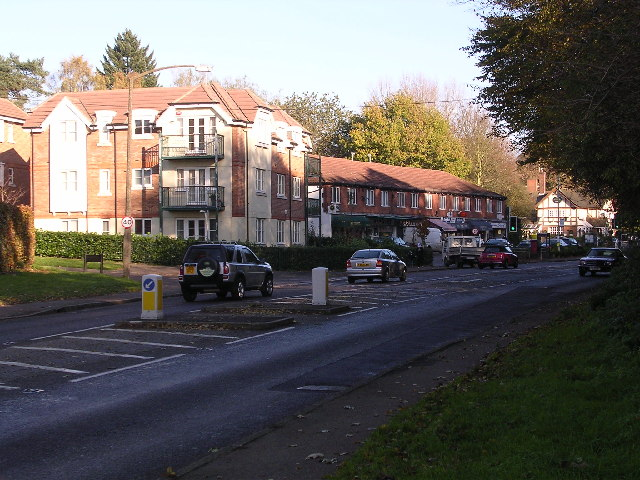
- Old Great North Road, Oaklands

- Location within Hertfordshire
- Area: 3.650 km^{2} (1.409 sq mi)
- Population: 8,077 (2020 estimate)
  - Density: 2,213/km^{2} (5,730/sq mi)
- OS grid reference: TL245175
- Civil parish: Welwyn
- District: Welwyn Hatfield
- Shire county: Hertfordshire
- Region: East
- Country: England
- Sovereign state: United Kingdom
- Post town: Welwyn
- Postcode district: AL6
- Dialling code: 01438
- Police: Hertfordshire
- Fire: Hertfordshire
- Ambulance: East of England
- UK Parliament: Welwyn Hatfield

Oaklands is a hamlet in the civil parish of Welwyn, in Hertfordshire, England. It is in the Haldens Ward of the Borough of Welwyn Hatfield. In 2020 it had an estimated population of 8077.
