= Bozen Green =

Coordinates: 51.92°N 00.03°E

- Location within Hertfordshire
- OS grid reference: TL4027
- Civil parish: Braughing
- District: East Hertfordshire
- Shire county: Hertfordshire
- Region: East
- Country: England
- Sovereign state: United Kingdom
- Post town: Ware
- Postcode district: SG11 2
- Police: Hertfordshire
- Fire: Hertfordshire
- Ambulance: East of England

Bozen Green is a hamlet in Hertfordshire, England. It includes the lost settlement of Bordesden. It is in the civil parish of Braughing.
