= Little Amwell =

Coordinates: 51.78714°N 0.04290°W

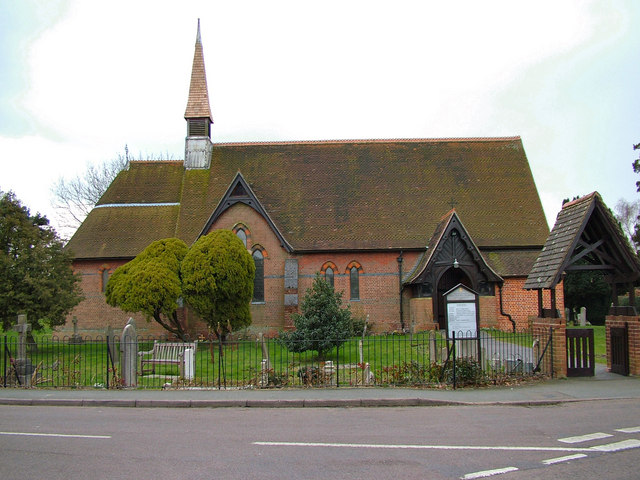
- Holy Trinity Church

- Location within Hertfordshire
- OS grid reference: TL351116
- Civil parish: Hertford Heath
- District: East Hertfordshire
- Shire county: Hertfordshire
- Region: East
- Country: England
- Sovereign state: United Kingdom
- Post town: Hertford
- Postcode district: SG13
- Dialling code: 01992

Little Amwell was formerly a village and civil parish in Hertfordshire, England, lying 1.6 miles (2.6 km) south-east of the county town of Hertford. The old village of Little Amwell forms the northern part of the modern village of Hertford Heath. The civil parish of Little Amwell was abolished in 1990, merging with parts of the neighbouring parishes of Great Amwell, Stanstead St Margarets, and Ware to form the new parish of Hertford Heath. Little Amwell remains the name of the ecclesiastical parish which covers Hertford Heath. In 1961 the parish had a population of 982.

== History ==
At the time of the Domesday Book in 1086, Little Amwell and neighbouring Great Amwell seem to have been a single parish called Amwell, recorded as "Emmewell". Little Amwell was later acquired by the monks of Waltham Abbey, who annexed it to the parish of All Saints, Hertford, which the abbey also owned. Little Amwell was deemed to be a "parish liberty", exempt from some of the normal controls of the authorities. The parish liberty of Little Amwell had its own overseers of the poor, and was included in the Hertford Poor Law Union from 1835.

One of the chain of beacons used to give early warning of the approach of the Spanish Armada in 1588 was on the village green at Little Amwell.

Holy Trinity Church was built on the south side of the village green in Little Amwell in 1863. A separate ecclesiastical parish of Little Amwell was created on 2 August 1864, which covered a larger area than the parish liberty, taking in parts of the neighbouring parishes of Great Amwell and All Saints' and St John, Hertford.

The parish liberty was deemed to be a civil parish following the passing of the Poor Law Amendment Act 1866 on 10 August 1866. From 1872, Little Amwell formed one of the parishes of the Hertford Rural Sanitary District, which became the Hertford Rural District in 1894. In turn, Hertford Rural District was abolished in 1974 to became part of East Hertfordshire.

To the south of Little Amwell was the hamlet of Hertford Heath, which was in the civil parish of Great Amwell. The urban areas of Hertford Heath and Little Amwell gradually merged into one settlement through the 20th century. Hertford Heath was used as the postal address for both villages. On 1 April 1990 the civil parish of Little Amwell was abolished, merging with parts of the neighbouring parishes of Great Amwell, Stanstead St Margarets, and Ware, to become a new civil parish called Hertford Heath.

In 1991 East Hertfordshire District Council designated a conservation area covering the village green and surrounding area of Little Amwell. The conservation area was originally called the "Hertford Heath Conservation Area". When reviewing the conservation area in 2018, the district council changed the name to the "Little Amwell Conservation Area" as a more accurate name.
