= Brickendon =

Village in Hertfordshire, England

Coordinates: 51.755°N 0.0853°W

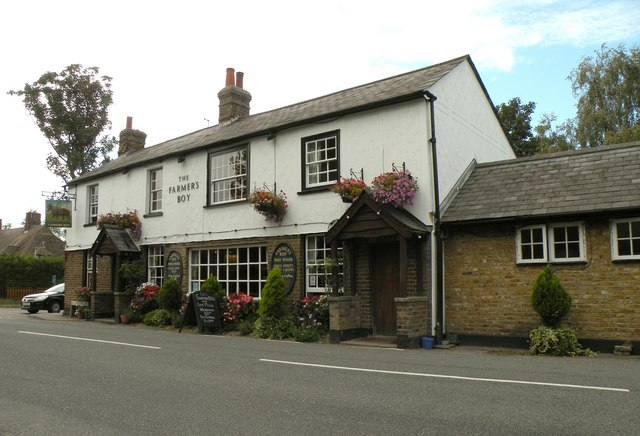

- Location within Hertfordshire
- Population: 711 (Brickendon Liberty parish, 2021)
- OS grid reference: TL322074
- Civil parish: Brickendon Liberty
- District: East Hertfordshire
- Shire county: Hertfordshire
- Region: East
- Country: England
- Sovereign state: United Kingdom
- Post town: HERTFORD
- Postcode district: SG13
- Police: Hertfordshire
- Fire: Hertfordshire
- Ambulance: East of England

Brickendon is a village in the civil parish of Brickendon Liberty in the East Hertfordshire district of Hertfordshire, England. The village lies about 3 miles (5 km) south of the county town Hertford, which is also its post town. As well as Brickendon village, the parish of Brickendon Liberty also covers surrounding rural areas. At the 2021 census the parish had a population of 711.

Brickendon village is centred on a traditional village green and a village pub, The Farmer's Boy. There is an active community with several clubs and activities.

The name is said to have come from a Saxon by the name of Bricca who laid claim to the hill site, the Saxon word 'don' meaning a hill; thus Bricca's Hill. In the Domesday Book of 1086 the name appears as Brichendone. The manor of Brickendon was held by the canons and later the monks of Waltham Abbey, Essex, from about 1060 until the Dissolution of the Monasteries. Henry II created the liberty of Brickendon in about 1174/84, which granted the abbot freedom from certain taxes normally due to the crown.

The chapel, dedicated to the Holy Cross and St Alban, was built in 1932 on land and with funds donated by Constance Demain Saunders and her mother Minnie Kingsley. It is part of the ecclesiastical parish of Bayford within the Hartford Hundred West group of parishes.

Brickendon Grange was built by Benjamin Cherry in 1859 and is now a golf club designed by CK Cotton. Fanshaws mansion, built in 1885 by Henry Wilson Demain Saunders, is now the headquarters of the Institute of the Motor Industry. The second series of Catweazle was filmed around Brickendon in 1970.

The former manor house at Brickendonbury was used as a spy training centre during World War II as Station XVII of the Special Operations Executive (SOE) and is now home to the Tun Abdul Razak Research Centre of the Malaysian Rubber Board.

== Governance ==
Brickendon has three tiers of local government, at parish, district, and county level: Brickendon Liberty Parish Council, East Hertfordshire District Council, and Hertfordshire County Council.

The name of the modern civil parish is "Brickendon Liberty", referencing the area's former status as a parish liberty. The liberty of Brickendon was deemed to be part of the parish of All Saints, Hertford, but appointed its own overseers of the poor. Brickendon was included in the Hertford Poor Law Union from 1835 with its own representative on the Board of Guardians. As such, Brickendon was deemed to be a separate civil parish from 10 August 1866 under the Poor Law Amendment Act 1866. The civil parish of Brickendon at that time stretched from Brickendon village in the south right up into the town of Hertford in the north, with Castle Street, West Street and All Saints' Church all being within the civil parish of Brickendon, which was partly inside and partly outside the borough of Hertford. In 1891 the parish had a population of 1007.

Under the Local Government Act 1894, parishes which straddled borough boundaries were split into separate parishes inside and outside the borough. On 4 December 1894 the parish of Brickendon was therefore abolished and split to form two parishes called "Brickendon Rural" and "Brickendon Urban". Brickendon Rural was included in the Hertford Rural District. Brickendon Urban had no parish council; it was governed directly by Hertford Borough Council. On 30 September 1900 Brickendon Urban and all the other civil parishes within the borough were abolished to become a single parish called Hertford.

On 1 April 1929 the civil parish of Brickendon Liberty was created when Brickendon Rural merged with the neighbouring parish of St John Rural, which had been a sparsely populated rural parish created in 1894 from the parts of the old parish of St John, Hertford which lay outside the borough. On 1 April 1935 parts of Broxbourne, Hoddesdon Rural and Wormley were transferred to Brickendon Liberty when these parishes were abolished. On 1 April 1939 part of Brickendon Liberty was transferred to Little Amwell.

Brickendon Liberty remained in Hertford Rural District until that district was abolished in 1974 to become part of East Hertfordshire.
