= Eastwick, Hertfordshire =

Village in Hertfordshire, England

Coordinates: 51.786218°N 0.078711100°E

Eastwick
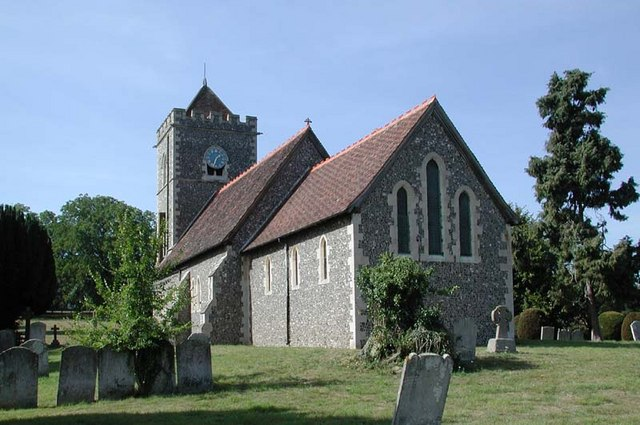
- Parish church of St Botolph

- Location within Hertfordshire
- Area: 4.25 km^{2} (1.64 sq mi)
- Population: 184 (Parish, 2021)
  - Density: 43/km^{2} (110/sq mi)
- Civil parish: Eastwick
- District: East Hertfordshire
- Shire county: Hertfordshire
- Region: East
- Country: England
- Sovereign state: United Kingdom
- Post town: HARLOW
- Postcode district: CM20
- Police: Hertfordshire
- Fire: Hertfordshire
- Ambulance: East of England

Eastwick is a village and civil parish in the East Hertfordshire district of Hertfordshire, England. It lies 1 mile (1.6 km) north-west of the centre of Harlow, its post town, which lies over the county boundary in Essex. The River Stort forms the southern boundary of the parish and is also the county boundary. At the 2021 census the parish had a population of 184.

It shares a grouped parish council with the neighbouring parish of Gilston.

== History ==
The name "Eastwick" means 'East settlement'. Eastwick was recorded in the Domesday Book as Esteuuiche. Eastwick was Esteuiche in the 11th century, Estuic in the 12th century, Estuick, Estwyk and Estwyke in the 13th century, Estwyk atte Flore in the 14th century and Eastuick in the 16th century.

In 1912 the parish had an area of 840 acres.

== Landmarks ==
There are 11 listed buildings in the parish of Eastwick. Eastwick has a church called St Botolph's Church and a pub called the Lion.

== See also ==
- The Hundred Parishes
