= Aspenden =

Coordinates: 51.9356°N 0.0193°W

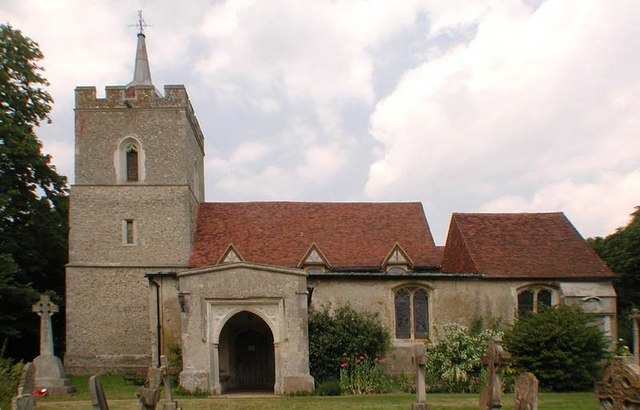
- St Mary, Aspenden

- Location within Hertfordshire
- Population: 239 (Parish, 2021)
- OS grid reference: TL361282
- District: East Hertfordshire
- Shire county: Hertfordshire
- Region: East
- Country: England
- Sovereign state: United Kingdom
- Post town: BUNTINGFORD
- Postcode district: SG9
- Dialling code: 01763
- Police: Hertfordshire
- Fire: Hertfordshire
- Ambulance: East of England
- UK Parliament: North East Hertfordshire

Aspenden is a village and civil parish in the East Hertfordshire district of Hertfordshire, England. It lies immediately south of Buntingford, its post town. At the 2021 census the parish had a population of 239.

Its name, which means 'valley of aspen trees', was first attested in 1212. The Prime Meridian passes just to the east of the village.

== See also ==
- The Hundred Parishes
