= Bayford, Hertfordshire =

Village and civil parish in England

Coordinates: 51.760°N 0.102°W

Bayford
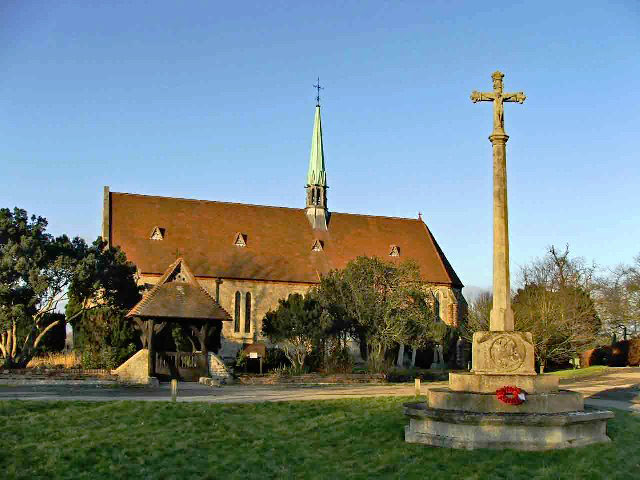
- Parish church of St Mary

- Location within Hertfordshire
- Population: 478 (Parish, 2021)
- District: East Hertfordshire
- Shire county: Hertfordshire
- Region: East
- Country: England
- Sovereign state: United Kingdom
- Post town: HERTFORD
- Postcode district: SG13
- UK Parliament: North East Hertfordshire

Bayford is a village and civil parish in the East Hertfordshire district of Hertfordshire, England. It lies 3 miles (5 km) south of Hertford, its post town. It is served by Bayford railway station. At the 2021 census the parish had a population of 478.

Bayford has a primary school: Bayford (C of E) VC Primary School.

Bayford's parish church is dedicated to St Mary. The current building dates from 1870 and stands about a quarter of a mile north of the village. This church stands close to the site of the medieval church it replaced, which was first mentioned in 1222. A 15th-century font and some 16th- and 17th-century monuments to the Knighton family have been preserved. The ornithologist William Yarrell, admired by his contemporaries for his precise scientific work, is buried in the churchyard.

Every two years the village holds a Gardens Open Day, when many of the residents open up their gardens to the public.

The manor of Bayford was purchased in 1758 by William Baker (1705–1770). He then had the mansion of Bayfordbury built between 1759 and 1762.

The mansion was extended by infilling between the service blocks, to house the Kit-Cat Club portraits, which Baker inherited from Jacob Tonson. In 1941, Bayfordbury was leased to Dr Barnardo's Homes for young boys aged 9 to 14 years of age. In 1945, the John Innes Institute moved to Bayfordbury and built glass houses, a research block and houses at Broad Green Wood for their staff. The estate was later acquired by Hertfordshire County Council and occupied by Hatfield Polytechnic (later the University of Hertfordshire). They constructed Bayfordbury Observatory, which is regarded as one of the finest teaching observatories in the country, and used the research block for chemical and biological research. The mansion and stables have now been converted into residences. The research block is still used by the University and the grounds as a Regional Science Learning Centre and environmental science field study centre.

Bayford railway station is to the east of the village, on the Hertford Loop line. The station opened with the line in 1924.
