= Little Munden =

Civil parish in Hertfordshire, England

Coordinates: 51.879°N 0.062°W

- Civil parish
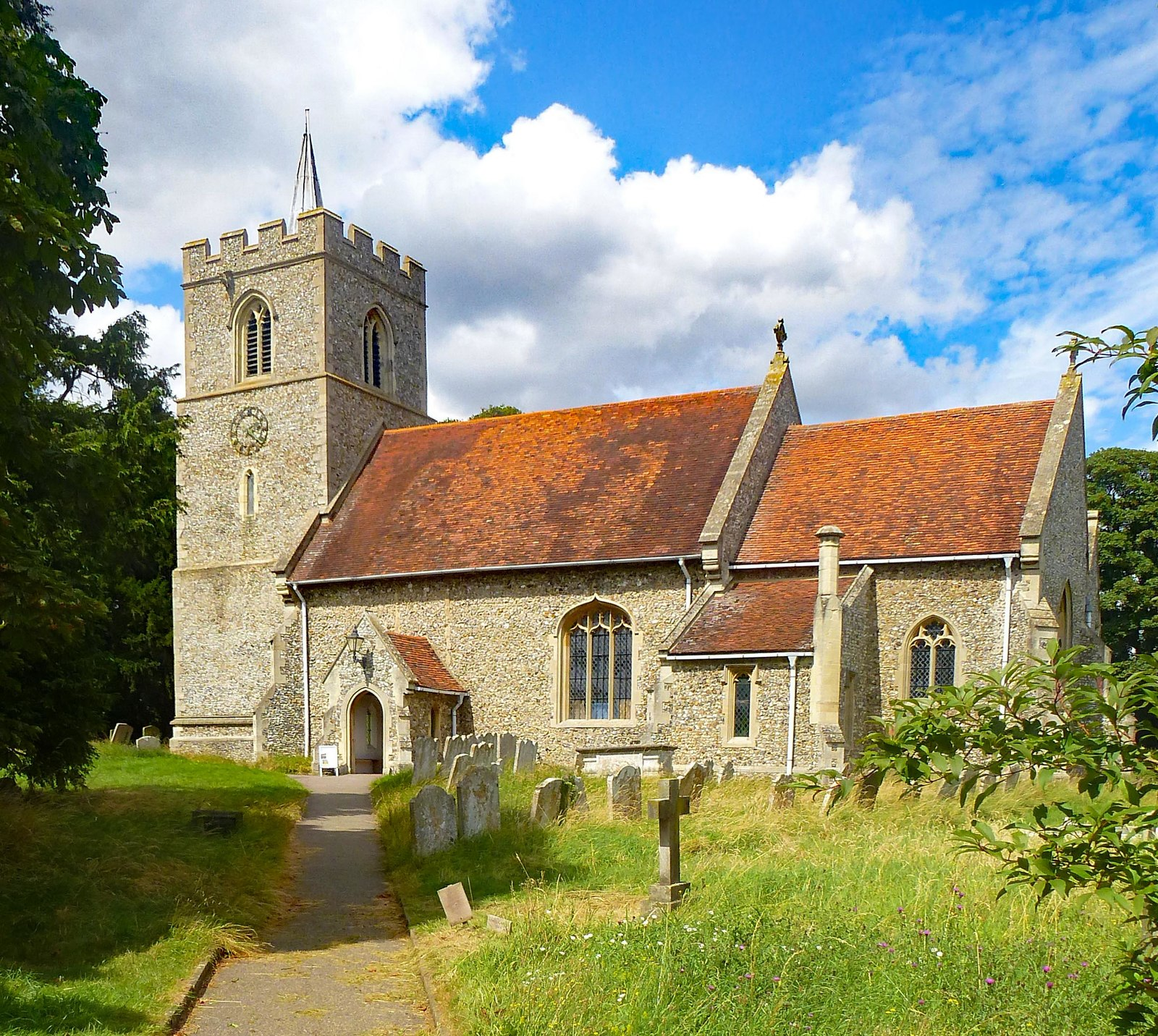
- All Saints' Church

- Location within Hertfordshire
- Population: 968 (Parish, 2021)
- Civil parish: Little Munden
- District: East Hertfordshire
- Shire county: Hertfordshire
- Region: East
- Country: England
- Sovereign state: United Kingdom
- Post town: WARE
- Postcode district: SG12
- UK Parliament: North East Hertfordshire

Little Munden is a civil parish in the East Hertfordshire district of Hertfordshire, England. It lies 5 miles (8 km) north of Ware, its post town. The main village in the parish is Dane End. The small namesake settlement of Little Munden itself comprises the parish church, village school and one house, and stands on a hillside immediately north of Dane End. The parish also covers surrounding rural areas, including the hamlets of Green End, Haultwick, and Potter's Green. At the 2021 census, the parish had a population of 968.

== History ==
In the Domesday Book of 1086 there were two estates or manors listed at the vill of Mundene in the Broadwater hundred of Hertfordshire. The Domesday Book does not otherwise distinguish between the two Munden manors by name, but the manor owned by Count Alan of Brittany later became known as Great Munden or Munden Furnival, and the manor owned in 1086 by Walter of Flanders was later known as Little Munden or Munden Frevil.

Little Munden was an ancient parish. A priest was listed at Little Munden in the Domesday Book, suggesting it was already a parish by then. No priest was listed at Great Munden at that time, although it subsequently also became a parish. Little Munden's parish church, dedicated to All Saints, dates back to the 11th century.

Little Munden was historically described as a village and was labelled as such on the earliest Ordnance Survey maps in the 19th century. The main settlement in the parish grew up in the valley immediately south of Little Munden itself; this settlement was historically called Munden Street, but subsequently became known as Dane End. The settlement of Little Munden itself is no longer labelled on Ordnance Survey maps, and is now classed as part of Dane End in official postal addresses.

There are 36 listed buildings in the parish of Little Munden.

== Governance ==
There are three tiers of local government covering Little Munden, at parish, district, and county level: Little Munden Parish Council, East Hertfordshire District Council, and Hertfordshire County Council. The parish council generally meets at the Memorial Hall in Dane End.

== Sport ==
Little Munden Cricket Club is the parish's only sport's team and plays at Green End. The club was established in 1860 and in the early 20th century fielded four teams. The club's pavilion was built in 1922 and remains mostly original. The club currently has a Saturday team which plays in the Herts and Essex Borders League as well as friendlies.

== See also ==
- Little Munden Primary School
- List of civil parishes in Hertfordshire
- List of places in Hertfordshire
