= Rushden, Hertfordshire =

Village in Hertfordshire, England

Coordinates: 51.9676°N 0.10527°W

Rushden
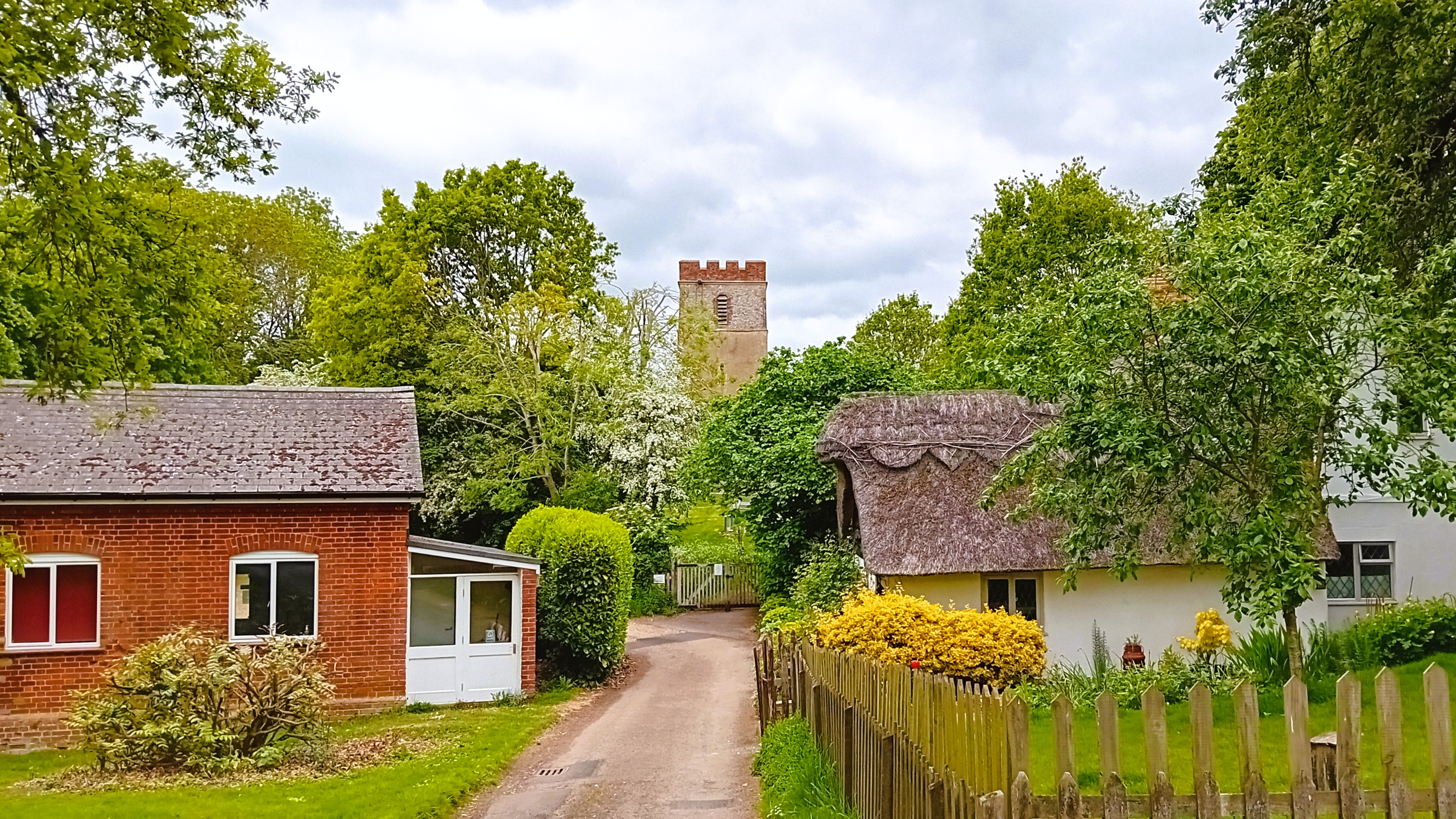
- Village hall, St Mary's Church and cottage

- Location within Hertfordshire
- Population: 226 (Parish, 2021)
- OS grid reference: TL302315
- Civil parish: Rushden
- District: North Hertfordshire
- Shire county: Hertfordshire
- Region: East
- Country: England
- Sovereign state: United Kingdom
- Post town: BUNTINGFORD
- Postcode district: SG9
- Dialling code: 01763
- Police: Hertfordshire
- Fire: Hertfordshire
- Ambulance: East of England
- UK Parliament: North East Hertfordshire

Rushden is a small village and civil parish in the North Hertfordshire district of Hertfordshire, England. It lies 4 miles (6 km) north-west of Buntingford, its post town. It shares a grouped parish council with the neighbouring parish of Wallington. The population of the parish was 226 at the 2021 census.

== Geography ==
Rushden is located just off the A507 between Baldock and Buntingford. Rushden has several clusters of development, including around the village green near the church, at Southern Green to the east, at Mill End to the west, and at Cumberlow Green to the south. Rushden's only public house is the Moon and Stars at Mill End.

Immediately north of the village is the extensive private parkland of the Julians estate, centred on an early 17th century mansion.

== History ==
Rushden appears in the Domesday Book of 1086, when 19 households were listed.

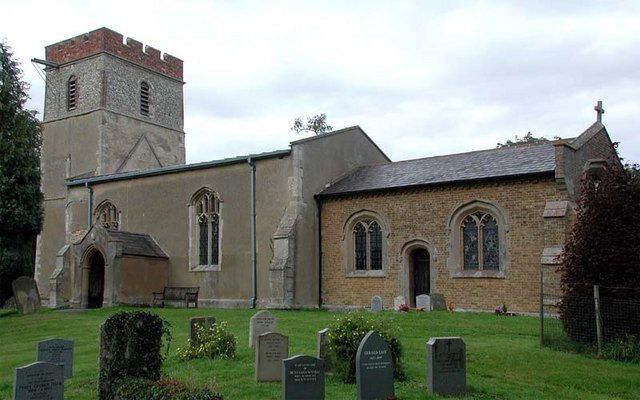
St Mary's Church

A church is known to have existed at Rushden since at least 1220. The current building, which is dedicated to St Mary, appears to date from the mid-14th century.

== Governance ==
There are three tiers of local government covering Rushden, at parish, district, and county level: Rushden and Wallington Parish Council, North Hertfordshire District Council, and Hertfordshire County Council. The parish council is a grouped parish council, also covering the neighbouring parish of Wallington. The parish council holds its meetings alternately at Rushden Village Hall and Wallington Village Hall.

== Population ==
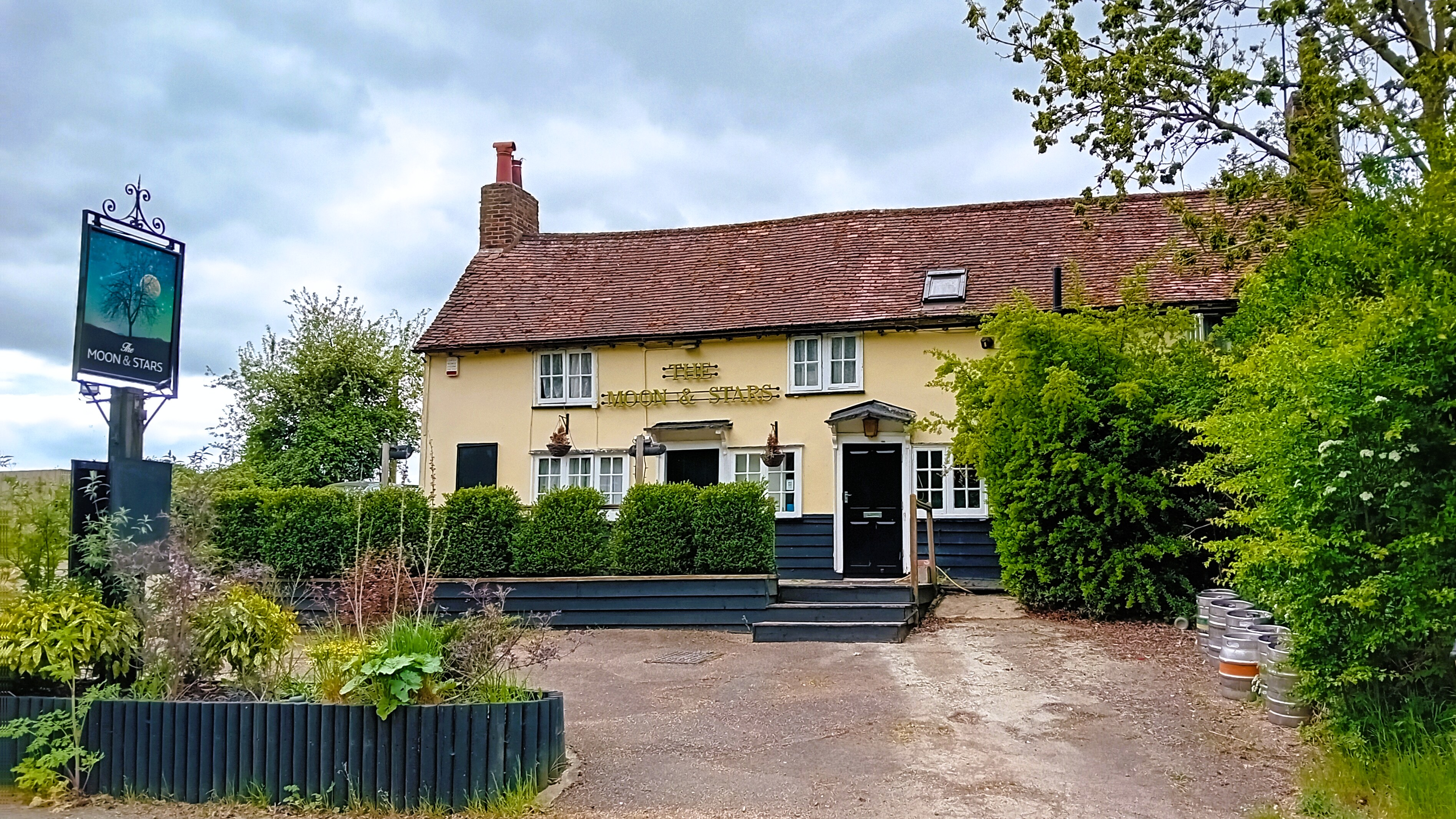
The Moon and Stars public house, Mill End

At the 2021 census the population of the parish was 226. The population had been 242 in 2011.

== Notable residents ==
- Percy Portsmouth, (1874–1953) sculptor, retired to "Youngloves" in Rushden.
