= Anstey (surname) =

Anstey is a surname held by approximately eight thousand people worldwide. The surname itself originated in the 12th century from Anstey in Hertfordshire. Notable people with the surname include:

- Al Anstey (born 1966), British media executive
- Arthur Anstey (1873–1955), English Anglican priest, Bishop of Trinidad and Tobago from 1918 to 1945
- Brendel Anstey (1887–1933), English footballer who played for Aston Villa and Leicester City
- Bruce Anstey (born 1969), New Zealand motorcycle racer
- Carol Anstey (born 1974), Canadian politician
- Caroline Anstey (born 1955), British economist who directed the World Bank from 2011 to 2013
- Chris Anstey (born 1975), Australian basketball player
- Christopher Anstey (1724–1805), English writer and poet
- Dan Anstey (born 1984), Australian radio and television presenter
- Edgar Anstey (1907–1987), English film maker
- Edgar Anstey (psychologist) (1917–2009), British psychologist
- Edward Alfred Anstey (1858–1952), Australian politician
- F. Anstey, pseudonym for Thomas Anstey Guthrie (1856–1934), an English novelist and journalist who wrote comic novels
- Frank Anstey (1865–1940), Australian politician in both the Victorian and Commonwealth parliaments
- George Alexander Anstey (1814–1895), South Australian viticulturist and Member of Parliament
- Harry Anstey (1847–1927), Australian prospector and politician
- Henry Anstey (1822–1862), British politician in Tasmania
- Jack Anstey (born 1997), Australian track and field athlete
- Jacob Anstey (born 1978), Australian rules footballer
- Jay Anstey (born 1991), South African actress and model
- Kaarin Anstey, Australian psychologist and dementia scientist
- Martin Anstey (1860–1921), English Bible chronologer
- Nigel Anstey (born 1927), British geophysicist
- Norman Anstey, South African actor, singer, and MC
- Percy Anstey (1876–1920), British actor and economist
- Olive Anstey (1920–1983), Australian hospital matron
- Olga Anstey (1912–1985), Jewish-Ukrainian poet also known as "Olga Anstei"
- Rhoda Anstey (1865–1936), English suffragist, tax resister and physical education teacher
- Rhys Anstey, Welsh rugby union player
- Ryan Anstey (born 1983), Canadian professional soccer player
- Thomas Chisholm Anstey (1816–1873), British parliamentarian, lawyer and second Attorney General of Hong Kong
- Vera Anstey (1889–1976), British economist
- Veronica Anstey (1935–2014), English amateur golfer

== Disambiguation pages ==
- John Anstey (disambiguation)

== See also ==
- Anstee
- Anstie
- Ansty (disambiguation)
