= Anstey =

Anstey may refer to:

== People ==
- Anstey (surname)

== Places ==
=== Australia ===
- Anstey railway station, on the Upfield railway line, Melbourne, Victoria
- Anstey Hill Recreation Park, a public park in Adelaide, South Australia

=== Canada ===
- Anstey River, British Columbia
- Anstey's Cove, a hamlet near Little Bay Islands, Newfoundland and Labrador

=== England ===
==== Settlements ====
- Anstey, Hertfordshire
- Anstey, Leicestershire
- East Anstey and West Anstey, villages in Devon
- Anstey Heights, part of Beaumont Leys, Leicester

==== Other places in England ====
- Anstey Castle, the remains of a 12th-century castle in Anstey, Hertfordshire
- Anstey College of Physical Education, Birmingham
- Anstey Nomads F.C., a football club based in Anstey, Leicestershire

=== South Africa ===
- Ansteys Building, an art deco building in Johannesburg

== See also ==
- Anstey case (1158–1163), a legal dispute between Richard of Anstey and Mabel de Francheville
- Ansty (disambiguation)
