= 1910–11 Aston Villa F.C. season =

English football club season

Aston Villa
1910–11 season
- President: Joseph Ansell
- Chairman: Frederick Rinder
- Manager: George Ramsay
- First Division: 2nd
- FA Cup: Second Round
Home colours

The 1910-11 English football season was Aston Villa's 23rd season in the Football League competing in the First Division, (Note: Up until 1992, the top division of English football was the Football League First Division. The Premier League took over from the First Division as the top tier of the English football league system upon its formation in 1992. The First Division then became the second tier of English football, the Second Division became the third tier and so on. The First Division is now known as the Football League Championship, while the Second Division is now known as Football League One.) the top flight of English football at the time.

Aston Villa featured in the plot of Arnold Bennett's 1911 comic novel The Card, a Story of Adventure in the Five Towns, putting in an offer for the fictional player, Callear.

== Charity Shield ==
Aston Villa F.C. started the 1910–11 season as champions, so opened the season in the Charity Shield game against Southern League champions Brighton & Hove Albion. Brighton are the only club to win just the Shield but never the FA Cup or the League. In the five years that the Charity Shield was contested by the winners of the Football League and Southern League between 1908 and 1912, this was the only occasion on which the Southern League champions prevailed. The victory remains Brighton's only national honour to date and they, not Aston Villa, were crowned the 'Champions of all England'.

== First Division ==
| Pos | Team | Pld | W | D | L | GF | GA | GAv | Pts |
|---|---|---|---|---|---|---|---|---|---|
| 1 | Manchester United (C) | 38 | 22 | 8 | 8 | 72 | 40 | 1.800 | 52 |
| 2 | Aston Villa | 38 | 22 | 7 | 9 | 69 | 41 | 1.683 | 51 |
| 3 | Sunderland | 38 | 15 | 15 | 8 | 67 | 48 | 1.396 | 45 |
| 4 | Everton | 38 | 19 | 7 | 12 | 50 | 36 | 1.389 | 45 |
| 5 | Bradford City | 38 | 20 | 5 | 13 | 51 | 42 | 1.214 | 45 |

Source: World Football
Rules for classification: 1) Points; 2) Goal average; 3) Goals scored
(C) Champions

Matches

| 3 September 1910 | Aston Villa | 1–1 | Oldham Athletic | Villa Park |
| | Billy Gerrish (87') | Report |

| 10 September 1910 | Sunderland | 3–2 | Aston Villa | Roker Park |
| | | Report | Jock Logan (56'); Joe Bache (75') |
Note:

| 17 September 1910 | Aston Villa | 3–0 | Arsenal | Villa Park |
| | Billy Gerrish (10'); Bill Renneville (66'); Jock Logan (67') | Report |
Note: First win, and first clean sheet before a crowd of 20,000

| 24 September 1910 | Bradford City | 1–2 | Aston Villa | Valley Parade |
| | | Report | Jimmy Jones (18'); Joe Walters (89') |

| 1 October 1910 | Aston Villa | 2–2 | Blackburn Rovers | Villa Park |
| | Edmund Eyre (16'); Joe Bache (25') | Report |

| 8 October 1910 | Nottingham Forest | 3–1 | Aston Villa | City Ground |
| | | Report | Harry Hampton (8') |

| 15 October 1910 | Aston Villa | 2–1 | Manchester City | Villa Park |
| | Joe Bache (38'); Joe Walters | Report |

| 22 October 1910 | Everton | 0–1 | Aston Villa | Goodison Park |
| | | Report | Joe Walters (63') |

| 29 October 1910 | Aston Villa | 2–1 | Sheffield Wednesday | Villa Park |
| | Charlie Wallace (20'); Joe Bache (82') | Report |

| 5 November 1910 | Bristol City | 1–2 | Aston Villa | Ashton Gate |
| | | Report | Joe Bache (12'); Joe Walters (14') |

| 12 November 1910 | Aston Villa | 3–2 | Newcastle United | Villa Park |
| | Harry Hampton (7', 30'); Joe Walters (32') | Report |

| 19 November 1910 | Tottenham Hotspur | 1–2 | Aston Villa | White Hart Lane |
| | | Report | Harry Hampton (60'); Joe Walters (70') |

| 26 November 1910 | Aston Villa | 5–0 | Middlesbrough | Villa Park |
| | Joe Bache (18', 28', 67'); Harry Hampton (57', 85') | Report |

| 3 December 1910 | Preston North End | 0–1 | Aston Villa | Deepdale |
| | | Report | Charlie Wallace (10' pen) |

| 10 December 1910 | Aston Villa | 3–1 | Notts County | Villa Park |
| | Joe Bache (18', 39'); Harry Hampton (75') | Report |

| 17 December 1910 | Manchester United | 2–0 | Aston Villa | Old Trafford |
| | | Report |

| 24 December 1910 | Aston Villa | 1–1 | Liverpool | Villa Park |
| | Harry Hampton (76') | Report |

| 26 December 1910 | Aston Villa | 4–1 | Bury | Villa Park |
| | Harry Hampton (25'); Horace Henshall; Joe Bache; Joe Walters (84') | Report |

| 28 December 1910 | Sheffield United | 2–1 | Aston Villa | Bramall Lane |
| | | Report | Joe Walters (62') |

| 31 December 1910 | Oldham Athletic | 1–1 | Aston Villa | Boundary Park |
| | | Report | Edmund Eyre (38') |

| 2 January 1911 | Bury | 1–0 | Aston Villa | Gigg Lane |
| | | Report |

| 7 January 1911 | Aston Villa | 2–1 | Sunderland | Villa Park |
| | Joe Bache (11') | Report |

| 28 January 1911 | Aston Villa | 4–1 | Bradford City | Villa Park |
| | Joe Walters (23'); Horace Henshall (41'); Harry Hampton (69') | Report |

| 11 February 1911 | Aston Villa | 3–1 | Nottingham Forest | Villa Park |
| | Harry Hampton (35'); Horace Henshall (55'); Joe Walters (60') | Report |

| 18 February 1911 | Manchester City | 1–1 | Aston Villa | Hyde Road |
| | | Report | Harry Hampton (5') |

| 25 February 1911 | Aston Villa | 4–0 | Tottenham Hotspur | Villa Park |
| | Charlie Wallace (16'); Joe Bache (32'); Clem Stephenson (52'); Harry Hampton (73') | Report |

| 4 March 1911 | Sheffield Wednesday | 1–0 | Aston Villa | Owlerton |
| | | Report |

| 11 March 1911 | Aston Villa | 2–0 | Bristol City | Villa Park |
| | Clem Stephenson (16'); Charlie Wallace (26') | Report |

| 15 March 1911 | Arsenal | 1–1 | Aston Villa | Manor Ground |
| | | Report | Clem Stephenson (20') |

| 18 March 1911 | Newcastle United | 1–0 | Aston Villa | St James' Park |
| | | Report |

| 27 March 1911 | Aston Villa | 2–1 | Everton | Villa Park |
| | Harry Hampton (60'); Joe Walters (62') | Report |

| 1 April 1911 | Middlesbrough | 0–1 | Aston Villa | Ayresome Park |
| | | Report | Horace Henshall (12') |

| 8 April 1911 | Aston Villa | 0–2 | Preston North End | Villa Park |
| | | Report |

| 14 April 1911 | Aston Villa | 3–0 | Sheffield United | Villa Park |
| | Charlie Wallace (35' pen); Harry Hampton (38'); Billy Gerrish | Report |

| 15 April 1911 | Notts County | 1–2 | Aston Villa | Trent Bridge |
| | | Report | Harry Hampton (37') |

| 22 April 1911 | Aston Villa | 4–2 | Manchester United | Villa Park |
| | Joe Bache (25'); Harry Hampton (35'); Horace Henshall (62'); Charlie Wallace (41' pen) | Report |

| 24 April 1911 | Blackburn Rovers | 0–0 | Aston Villa | Ewood Park |
| | | Report |

| 29 April 1911 | Liverpool | 3–1 | Aston Villa | Anfield |
| | | Report | Joe Walters (43') |
Note: https://www.avfchistory.co.uk/aston-villa/matches/league/1910-11

Source: avfchistory.co.uk

== FA Cup ==
In the First round, 36 of the 40 clubs from the First and Second divisions joined the 12 clubs who came through the qualifying rounds. The remaining sides, Stockport County, Lincoln City, Huddersfield Town and Gainsborough Trinity were entered in the fourth qualifying round. Huddersfield lost to Lincoln City and Stockport County lost to Rochdale in that round, while Lincoln City then lost to Stoke in the fifth qualifying round.

Sixteen non-league sides were given byes to the first round to bring the total number of teams up to 64. These were:

| Southampton Millwall Athletic Queens Park Rangers Crystal Palace | Swindon Town Plymouth Argyle Leyton Portsmouth | Northampton Town Bristol Rovers Norwich City Grimsby Town | West Ham United Brighton & Hove Albion Coventry City Brentford |

Grimsby Town had been voted out of the Football League during the 1910 close-season and were competing in the Midland League, while the others were all from the Southern League First Division.

32 matches were scheduled to be played on Saturday, 14 January 1911.

| Tie no | Home team | Score | Away team | Date |
|---|---|---|---|---|
| 24 | Portsmouth | 1–4 | Aston Villa | 14 January 1911 |

Second round

The sixteen second-round matches were played on Saturday, 4 February 1911. Four matches were drawn, with the replays taking place in the following midweek fixture.

| Tie no | Home team | Score | Away team | Date |
|---|---|---|---|---|
| 13 | Manchester United | 2–1 | Aston Villa | 4 February 1911 |

== Players ==
Cocky Hunter, the first Villa player to be ever sent off, was sent off for a second time.

There were debuts for Bill Renneville, Jimmy Jones, Horace Henshall, Clem Stephenson and Brendel Anstey.
