= Oakeshott =

Oakeshott is a surname. Notable people with the surname include:

- Ewart Oakeshott (1916–2002), British illustrator, collector, and amateur historian
- Grace Oakeshott (1872–1929), British activist for women's rights
- Isabel Oakeshott (born 1974), right-wing British political journalist and non-fiction author
- Matthew Oakeshott, Baron Oakeshott of Seagrove Bay (born 1947), British Liberal Democrat politician
- Michael Oakeshott (1901–1990), English philosopher
- Rob Oakeshott (born 1969), Australian politician
- Walter Fraser Oakeshott (1903–1987), schoolmaster and Oxford college head

== See also ==
- Oakeshott typology
