= Gilbert Slater =

English economist and social reformer (1864–1938)

- Born: 27 August 1864; Plymouth, Devon, England
- Died: 8 March 1938 (aged 73); Oxford, Oxfordshire, England
- Spouse: Violet Oakeshott (m. 1897)
- Father: Daniel Slater
- Relatives: Joseph Francis Oakeshott (brother-in-law); Michael Oakeshott (nephew); Grace Oakeshott (brother-in-law's wife)

Gilbert Slater (27 August 1864 – 8 March 1938) was an English economist and social reformer. He is known for rural developments he initiated in India.

Slater is also known for his love for Dravidian culture and civilization and for theorizing that the works of Shakespeare were actually written by several different writers at different times.

== Early life ==
Slater was born at Plymouth, England on 27 August 1864 to a schoolmaster, Daniel Slater.

== Academic career ==
Slater graduated in economics and taught the subject as an academic. He wrote one of the first PhDs at the London School of Economics. Enclosure of Common Fields in the Eighteenth and Nineteenth Centuries was published in 1905. (LSE Magazine Winter 2010)

== Principal of Ruskin College ==
Slater served as the Principal of Ruskin College, Oxford from 1909 to 1915.

== In India ==
In 1915, Slater sailed to India to take over as the first Professor of economics and head of the new economics department of the University of Madras which was founded in 1912. and chaired the economics department of Madras University from 1915 to 1921. Even before he arrived in India, Slater had learnt the Tamil language and was ready for his new assignment. During his tenure, Gilbert and his team performed a detailed survey of the villages in the Madras Presidency and analyzed the prevailing economic conditions. One of the people who assisted Slater in his study was South Indian businessman M. Ct. Muthiah Chettiar. The results of the survey were published in the book Some South Indian Villages. During his tenure, Slater worked hard to eradicate poverty.

Slater also demonstrated a keen interest in the culture and civilization of South India. Back in England in 1924, he published his book The Dravidian Elements in Indian Culture.

Slater was nominated to the Madras Legislative Council in 1921 and served for a year until his return to the United Kingdom in 1922. During his term in the council, he recommended the appointment of a committee to investigate the feasibility of the adoption of a common script for the whole Presidency. Slater's motion was, however, defeated by a huge margin.

On the choice of medium of instruction, he wrote:

All India labours under a very serious disadvantage because the language which is the medium of all higher instruction is different from the language of the home. For the present Dravida suffers least. On the average a student of the Madras University saves about a year, as compared with students of other Indian universities in the time necessarily spent in the preliminary study of English before beginning his chosen course of study. But, on the other and, the development of Bengali, Hindi or Urdu into an efficient medium for scientific and general education is a much more hopeful proposition than the modernising of any Dravidian language to attain the same result. Northern India can reasonably hope to make one of its vernaculars the literary and scientific organ of between two and three hundred million people; unification of the language of the masses with the language of the learned in South India is most likely to be reached with the disappearance of the Dravidian vernaculars

— Gilbert Slater, The Dravidian Elements in Indian Culture, pp. 172–173

Slater co-authored the book Indigenous Banking in India along with L. C. Jain in 1929.

== The Seven Shakespeares ==
Back in England, Slater studied Shakespeare and proposed a new variation of theory that the works attributed to Shakespeare were not his. In The Seven Shakespeares (1931) he argued that the works were actually written by seven different authors: Francis Bacon, Edward de Vere, 17th Earl of Oxford, Sir Walter Raleigh, William Stanley, 6th Earl of Derby, Christopher Marlowe, Mary Sidney, Countess of Pembroke, and Roger Manners, 5th Earl of Rutland. This so-called "group theory" revived Delia Bacon's early model of collaborative authorship and brought together all the most popular recent candidates.

== Death ==
Slater died on 8 March 1938 at the age of 73. He had married, in 1897, Violet, daughter of Joseph Oakeshott, of East Barnet, and Eliza Maria, née Dodd; she was a sister of the civil servant and Fabian Joseph Francis Oakeshott and of Harold Oakeshott, the husband of Grace Oakeshott.

== Legacy ==
The five villages in the Tamil speaking areas of the Madras Presidency were surveyed by Slater and his team in 1916 were surveyed again in the 1930s, 1960s, and 1980s. One of the villages was surveyed again in 2008.

On 22 January 2009 a portrait of Gilbert Slater was unveiled at the campus of the University of Madras by the Finance Minister of Tamil Nadu, K. Anbazhagan.

== Works ==
- Co-operators, the State, and the housing question [by G. Slater]. 1901.
- English Peasantry and the Enclosure of Common Fields. 1907.
- The Making of Modern England. Houghton Mifflin Company. 1915. (republished as "The Growth of Modern England" in 1939)
- David Cole. (1917). Ideas at War. Williams & Norgate. ISBN 978-1-59017-297-1.
- Some South Indian Villages. H. Milford, Oxford University Press. 1918.
- Slater, Gilbert (1924). The Dravidian Element in Indian Culture. Ernest Benn.
- L. C. Jain (1929). Indigenous Banking in India.
- Poverty and the State:A Study of English Conditions. Constable. 1930.
- Seven Shakespeares: A Discussion of the Evidence for Various Theories with Regard to Shakespeare's Identity. C. Palmer. 1931.
- Currency, Credit and the Unemployment Crisis. The Fabian Society. 1932.
- Southern India, Its Political and Economic Problems. G. Allen & Unwin. 1936.
- Vera Anstey, Vera Powell Anstey (1939). The Growth of Modern England (with Vera Anstey). Constable.
