= Joseph Francis Oakeshott =

British socialist activist and author

Joseph Francis Oakeshott (1860–1945) was a British socialist activist and author.

== Biography ==
Oakeshott was the son of Joseph Oakeshott (1820–1893) and Eliza Maria, née Dodd. From a fairly poor background, one of Oakeshott's ancestors on his mother's side was the portrait painter Daniel Dodd. His younger brother, Harold, was husband of Grace Oakeshott, an activist for women's rights; his sister Violet married the economist and social reformer Gilbert Slater.

After a grammar-school education, in the course of which he distinguished himself in French, he joined the civil service at the age of 16 as a "boy clerk", a new fast-track apprenticeship designed to prepare candidates for positions in the administrative class of the bureaucracy. He eventually reached the rank of a principal clerk (divisional head) in the Inland Revenue.

Oakeshott became interested in politics, and from 1882 to 1890 was the secretary of a local Liberal Party association. He became increasingly interested in socialism, and in 1888 joined the Fabian Society, winning election to its executive committee in 1890. He served on the first board of the London School of Economics and Political Science.

Oakeshott travelled widely across England, lecturing on behalf of the Fabians, and wrote several tracts and pamphlets on its behalf. He was the last secretary of the Fellowship of the New Life.

In 1898, he married Frances Maude, daughter of Islington silk-merchant Thomas Hellicar; a son was the philosopher and political theorist Michael Oakeshott. Through the Hellicar wealth, the Oakeshotts were able to live comfortably- with "a substantial house (owned by Frances's brother), a cook, a gardener, and... Swedish lady chauffeur."

Oakeshott authored The Humanizing of the Poor Law, published by the Humanitarian League in 1894.

Oakeshott died at Chesham Bois on 28 March 1945.
