= Michael Oakeshott =

English philosopher (1901–1990)

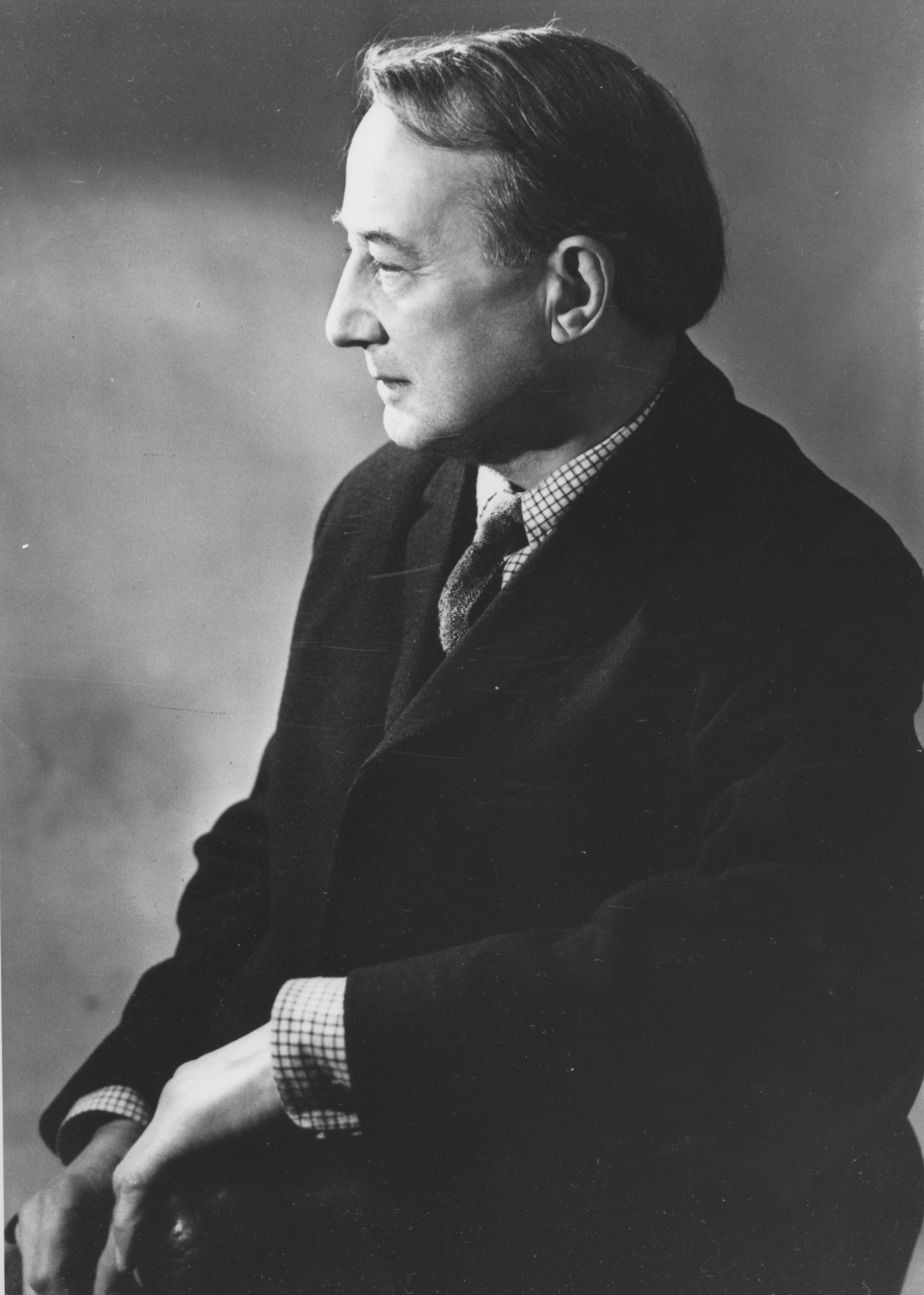
- Oakeshott in the 1960s
- Born: Michael Joseph Oakeshott; 11 December 1901; Chelsfield, Kent, England
- Died: 19 December 1990 (aged 89); Acton, England

Education
- Education: Gonville and Caius College, Cambridge

Philosophical work
- Era: 20th-century philosophy
- Region: Western philosophy: British philosophy
- School: British idealism; Liberal conservatism
- Institutions: Gonville and Caius College, Cambridge; London School of Economics
- Main interests: History of philosophy; Intellectual history; History of political thought; Philosophy of religion; Philosophy of history; Philosophy of politics
- Notable ideas: Adverbial conditions

Michael Joseph Oakeshott (Note: /ˈoʊkʃɒt/ OHK-shot) (11 December 1901 – 19 December 1990) was an English philosopher. He is known for his contributions to the philosophies of history, religion, aesthetics, education, and law.

== Early life and education ==
Oakeshott was born in Chelsfield, Kent, on 11 December 1901, the son of Joseph Francis Oakeshott, a civil servant with the Inland Revenue, and member of the Fabian Society, and Frances Maude, daughter of George Thistle Hellicar, a well-off Islington silk-merchant. His sister Violet married economist and social reformer Gilbert Slater. His uncle Harold's first wife was women's rights activist Grace Oakeshott, who in 1907 faked her death. He attended St George's School, Harpenden, a new co-educational and 'progressive' boarding school from 1912 to 1920. He enjoyed his schooldays, and the Headmaster, the Rev. Cecil Grant, a disciple of Maria Montessori, later became a friend. In 1920, Oakeshott matriculated with a Scholarship at Gonville and Caius College, Cambridge, where he read history, taking the Political Science options in both parts of the Tripos, the University of Cambridge's degree examinations. He graduated in 1923 with a first-class degree, subsequently promoted to MA (Cantab), and was elected a Fellow of Caius in 1925.

As a University of Cambridge student, he admired the British idealist philosophers J. M. E. McTaggart and John Grote, and the medieval historian Zachary Nugent Brooke. He said that McTaggart's introductory lectures were the only formal philosophical training he ever received. The historian Herbert Butterfield was a contemporary, friend and fellow member of the Junior Historians society.

After graduation in 1923, Oakeshott pursued theology and German literature in a summer course at the universities of Marburg and Tübingen, and again in 1925. In between, he taught literature for a year as Senior English Master at King Edward VII Grammar School, Lytham, while simultaneously writing his fellowship dissertation, which he said was a 'dry run' for his first book, Experience and its Modes.

== Career ==
Oakeshott was dismayed by the political extremism that occurred in Europe during the 1930s, and his surviving lectures from this period reveal a dislike of Nazism and Marxism. He is said to have been the first at Cambridge to lecture on Marx. At the suggestion of Sir Ernest Barker, who sought to see Oakeshott succeed to his own chair of political science at the University of Cambridge, he produced an anthology, with commentary, The Social and Political Doctrines of Contemporary Europe, published in 1939. For all its muddle and incoherence, as Oakeshott saw it, he found representative democracy the least unsatisfactory, in part because "the imposition of a universal plan of life on a society is at once stupid and immoral."

=== Second World War ===
Oakeshott joined the British Army in 1940, before being conscripted under the National Service Act. He volunteered for the virtually suicidal Special Operations Executive (SOE), where the average life expectancy was about six weeks, and was interviewed by Hugh Trevor-Roper, who felt that he was "too unmistakably English" to conduct covert operations on the Continent.

Oakeshott saw active service in Europe with the battlefield intelligence unit Phantom, a semi-freelance quasi-Signals organisation which also had connections with the Special Air Service (SAS). Though always at the front, the unit was seldom directly involved in any actual fighting. Oakeshott's military competence did not go unnoticed, and he ended the war as Adjutant of Phantom's 'B' Squadron and an acting major.

=== Postwar ===
In 1945, Oakeshott was demobilised and returned to the University of Cambridge. In 1949, he left Cambridge for Nuffield College, Oxford, but after only two years, in 1951, he was appointed Professor of Political Science at the London School of Economics (LSE), succeeding the leftist Harold Laski, an appointment noted by the popular press. Oakeshott was deeply unsympathetic to the student activism at LSE during the late 1960s, and highly critical of what he saw as the authorities' insufficiently robust response. He retired from the LSE in 1969, but continued teaching and conducting seminars until 1980.

Oakeshott lived long enough to experience increasing recognition, although he has become much more widely written about since his death. Oakeshott declined an offer to be made a Companion of Honour, for which he was proposed by Margaret Thatcher.

== Philosophy ==
=== Early works ===
Oakeshott's early work, some of which has been published posthumously as What is History? and Other Essays (2004) and The Concept of a Philosophical Jurisprudence (2007), shows that he was more interested in the philosophical problems that derived from his historical studies than he was in the history, even though he was officially a historian. Some of his very early essays are on religion (of a Christian 'modernist' kind), though after his first marital break-up (c. 1934) he published no more on the topic except for a couple of pages in his magnum opus, titled On Human Conduct. However, his posthumously published and voluminous Notebooks (1919-) show a lifelong preoccupation with religion and questions of mortality. In his youth he had considered taking Holy Orders, but later inclined towards a non-specific Romantic mysticism.

=== Philosophy and modes of experience ===
Oakeshott published his first book in 1933, Experience and its Modes, when he was thirty-one. He acknowledged the influence of Hegel and F. H. Bradley; commentators also noticed resemblances between this work and the ideas of thinkers such as R. G. Collingwood and Georg Simmel.

The book argued that our experience is usually modal, in the sense that we almost always have a governing perspective on the world, be it practical or theoretical. One may take various theoretical approaches to the world: natural science, history and practice, for example, are quite separate, immiscible modes of experience. It is a mistake, he declared, to treat history on the model of the sciences, or to read into it one's current practical concerns.

Philosophy, however, is not a mode. At this stage of his career Oakeshott understood philosophy as the world seen, in Spinoza's phrase, sub specie aeternitatis, literally "under the aspect of eternity", free from presuppositions, whereas science and history and the practical mode rely on certain assumptions. Later (there is disagreement about exactly when) Oakeshott adopted a pluralistic view of the various modes of experience, with philosophy just one voice among others, though it retained its self-critical character.

According to Oakeshott, the dominating principles of scientific and historical thought are quantity (the world sub specie quantitatis) and pastness (the world sub specie praeteritorum) respectively. Oakeshott distinguished the academic perspective on the past from the practical, in which the past is seen in terms of its relevance to our present and future. His insistence on the autonomy of history places him close to Collingwood, who also argued for the autonomy of historical knowledge.

The practical world view (the world sub specie voluntatis) presupposes the ideas of will and value. It is only in terms of these that practical action, for example in politics, economics, and ethics, makes sense. Because all action is conditioned by presuppositions, Oakeshott saw any attempt to change the world as reliant upon a scale of values, which themselves presuppose a context in which this is preferable to that. Even the conservative disposition to maintain the status quo (so long as the latter is tolerable) relies upon managing inevitable change, a point he later elaborated in his essay "On Being Conservative".

=== Post-war essays ===
During this period, Oakeshott published what became his best known work during his lifetime, the collection entitled Rationalism in Politics and Other Essays (1962), and notable for its elegance of style. Some of his near-polemics against the direction that Britain was taking, in particular towards socialism, gained Oakeshott a reputation as a traditionalist conservative, sceptical about rationalism and rigid ideologies. Bernard Crick described him as a "lonely nihilist".

Oakeshott's opposition to political utopianism is summed up in his analogy (possibly borrowed from a pamphlet by the 17th-century statesman George Savile, 1st Marquess of Halifax, The Character of a Trimmer) of a ship of state that has "neither starting-place nor appointed destination...[and where] the enterprise is to keep afloat on an even keel". He was a severe critic of E. H. Carr, the Cambridge historian of Soviet Russia, claiming that Carr was fatally uncritical of the Bolshevik regime and took some of its propaganda at face value.

=== On Human Conduct and Oakeshott's political theory ===
In his essay "On Being Conservative" (1956) Oakeshott characterised conservatism as a disposition rather than a political stance: "To be conservative ... is to prefer the familiar to the unknown, to prefer the tried to the untried, fact to mystery, the actual to the possible, the limited to the unbounded, the near to the distant, the sufficient to the superabundant, the convenient to the perfect, present laughter to utopian bliss."

Oakeshott's political philosophy, as advanced in On Human Conduct (1975), is free of any recognisable party politics. The book's first part ("On the Theoretical Understanding of Human Conduct") develops a theory of human action as the exercise of intelligent agency in activities such as wanting and choosing, the second ("On the Civil Condition") discusses the formal conditions of association appropriate to such intelligent agents, described as "civil" or legal association, and the third ("On the Character of a Modern European State") examines how far this understanding of human association has affected politics and political ideas in post-Renaissance European history.

Oakeshott suggests that there had been two major modes or understandings of political organization. In the first, which he calls "enterprise association" (or universitas), the state is (illegitimately) understood as imposing some universal purpose (profit, salvation, progress, racial domination) on its subjects. (As its name indicates, enterprise association is perfectly appropriate to the management of enterprises; however, except in emergencies such as war, where all resources must be commandeered into the pursuit of victory, the state is not an enterprise, properly so called.) By contrast, "civil association" (or societas) is primarily a legal relationship in which laws impose obligatory conditions of action but do not require the associates to choose one action rather than another. (Compare Robert Nozick on 'side-constraints'.)

The complex, technical and often rebarbative style of On Human Conduct found few readers, and its initial reception was mostly one of bafflement. Oakeshott, who rarely responded to critics, replied sardonically in Political Theory to some of the contributions made in a symposium on the book in the same journal.

In his posthumously published The Politics of Faith and the Politics of Scepticism Oakeshott describes enterprise associations and civil associations in different terms. In politics, an enterprise association is based on a fundamental faith in human ability to ascertain and grasp some universal good (leading to the Politics of Faith), and civil association is based on a fundamental scepticism about human ability to either ascertain or achieve this good (leading to the Politics of Scepticism). Oakeshott considers power (especially technological power) as a necessary prerequisite for the Politics of Faith, because it allows people to believe that they can achieve something great and to implement the policies necessary to achieve their goal. The Politics of Scepticism, on the other hand, rests on the idea that government should concern itself with preventing bad things from happening, rather than enabling ambiguously good events. Oakeshott was presumably dissatisfied with this book, which, like much of what he wrote, he never published. It was evidently written well before On Human Conduct.

In the latter book Oakeshott employs the analogy of the adverb to describe the kind of restraint that law involves. Laws prescribe "adverbial conditions": they condition our actions, but they do not determine their substantive chosen ends. For example, the law against murder is not a law against killing as such, but only a law against killing "murderously". Or, to choose a more trivial example, the law does not dictate that I have a car, but if I do, I must drive it on the same side of the road as everybody else. This contrasts with the rules of enterprise associations, in which the actions required by the management are made compulsory for all.

=== Philosophy of history ===
In the final work that Oakeshott published in his lifetime, On History (1983), he returned to the idea that history is a distinct mode of experience, but this time building on the theory of action developed in On Human Conduct. Much of On History had emerged from Oakeshott's post-retirement graduate seminars at LSE, and had been written at the same time as On Human Conduct, in the early 1970s.

During the mid-1960s Oakeshott declared an admiration for Wilhelm Dilthey, one of the pioneers of hermeneutics. On History can be interpreted as an essentially neo-Kantian enterprise of working out the conditions of the possibility of historical knowledge, work that Dilthey had begun.

The first three essays set out the distinction between the present of historical experience and the present of practical experience, as well as the concepts of historical situation, historical event, and what is meant by change in history. On History includes an essay on jurisprudence ("The Rule of Law"). It also includes a retelling of The Tower of Babel in a modern setting in which Oakeshott expresses disdain for human willingness to sacrifice individuality, culture, and quality of life for grand collective projects. He attributes this behaviour to fascination with novelty, persistent dissatisfaction, greed, and lack of self-reflection.

=== Other works ===
Oakeshott's other works included a reader, already mentioned, on The Social and Political Doctrines of Contemporary Europe. It consisted of selected texts illustrating the main doctrines of liberalism, national socialism, fascism, communism, and Roman Catholicism (1939). He edited Thomas Hobbes's Leviathan (1946), with an introduction that has been recognised as a significant contribution to the literature by some later scholars. Several of Oakeshott's writings on Hobbes were collected and published in 1975 as Hobbes on Civil Association.

With his Cambridge colleague Guy Thompson Griffith, Oakeshott wrote A Guide to the Classics, or How to Pick The Derby Winner (1936), a guide to the principles of successful betting on horse racing. This was his only published non-academic work.

Oakeshott was the author of well over 150 essays and reviews, most of which have now been republished.

Just before he died Oakeshott approved two edited collections of his works, The Voice of Liberal Learning (1989), a collection of his essays on education, and a second, revised and expanded edition of Rationalism in Politics (1991). Posthumous collections of his writings include Morality and Politics in Modern Europe (1993), a lecture series he gave at Harvard in 1958; Religion, Politics, and the Moral Life (1993), essays mostly from his early and middle periods; and The Politics of Faith and the Politics of Scepticism (1996), an already-mentioned manuscript from the 1950s contemporary with much of Rationalism in Politics but written in a more considered tone.

The bulk of his papers are now in the Oakeshott Archive at the London School of Economics. Further volumes of posthumous writings are in preparation, as is a biography, and a series of monographs devoted to his work were published during the first decade of the 21st century, and continue to be produced.

== Personal life ==
Oakeshott married three times and was twice divorced. In 1927, he married Joyce Fricker and they had one son, Simon. In 1936, while still with his wife, he began an affair with Kate Burton, a young graduate of Newnham College. In 1938 he was divorced and married Burton, gaining a small step-son, Christopher Cox, in whom he took little interest. They were together living in Great Shelford until 1940, but Oakeshott refused to have children with his second wife, and the marriage effectively came to an end during the Second World War. When Oakeshott returned from his military service at the end of the war, he moved into a college room and did not return to his wife. This is reported to have left her heartbroken.

From the 1940s to the 1960s, Oakeshott had numerous affairs, many of them with wives of his students, colleagues, and friends, and even with his son Simon's girlfriend. His most notable lover known to his biographers was Iris Murdoch. With Mary Walsh, in 1955 he had a son, Sebastian, out of wedlock, but abandoned them when the child was two and did not meet him again for nearly twenty years.

In 1965, a year after the death of his now divorced second wife, Oakeshott married Christel Schneider, who was then aged 27. Unlike his previous marriages, this one was a success. In Oakeshott's retirement, they lived in Langton Matravers, Dorset, and Oakeshott died in December 1990. Christel outlived him for more than thirty years, dying in Dorset in October 2021, aged 84.

== Bibliography ==
- 1933. Experience and Its Modes. Cambridge University Press
- 1936. A Guide to the Classics, or, How to Pick the Derby Winner. With G.T. Griffith. London: Faber and Faber
- 1939. The Social and Political Doctrines of Contemporary Europe. Cambridge: Cambridge University Press
- 1941. The Social and Political Doctrines of Contemporary Europe, 2nd edition. Cambridge: Cambridge University Press
- 1942. The Social and Political Doctrines of Contemporary Europe with five additional prefaces by F.A. Ogg. Cambridge: Cambridge University Press
- 1947. A New Guide to the Derby: How to Pick the Winner. With G.T. Griffith. London: Faber and Faber
- 1955. La Idea de Gobierno en la Europa Moderna. Madrid: Ateneo
- 1959. The voice of poetry in the conversation of mankind: an essay. Cambridge: Bowes & Bowes
- 1962. Rationalism in Politics and Other Essays. London: Methuen (Expanded edition – 1991, by Liberty Fund)
- 1966. Rationalismus in der Politik. (trans. K. Streifthau) Neuwied und Berlin: Luchterhard
- 1975. On Human Conduct. Oxford: Oxford University Press – via Internet Archive.
- 1975. Hobbes on Civil Association. Oxford: Basil Blackwell
- 1983. On History and Other Essays. Basil Blackwell
- 1985. La Condotta Umana. Bologna: Società Editrice il Mulino
- 1989. The Voice of Liberal Learning. New Haven and London: Yale University Press

=== Posthumous ===
- 1991. Rationalism in Politics and Other Essays. Indianapolis: Liberty Press
- 1993. Morality and Politics in Modern Europe. New Haven: Yale University Press
- 1993. Religion, Politics, and the Moral Life. New Haven: Yale University Press
- 1996. The Politics of Faith and the Politics of Skepticism. New Haven: Yale University Press
- 2000. Zuversicht und Skepsis: Zwei Prinzipien neuzeitlicher Politik. (trans. C. Goldmann). Berlin: Fest
- 2004. What Is History? And Other Essays. Thorverton: Imprint Academic
- 2006. Lectures in the History of Political Thought. Thorverton: Imprint Academic
- 2007. The Concept of a Philosophical Jurisprudence: Essays and Reviews 1926–51. Thorverton: Imprint Academic
- 2008. The Vocabulary of a Modern European State: Essays and Reviews 1952–88. Thorverton: Imprint Academic
- 2010. Early Political Writings 1925–30. Thorverton: Imprint Academic
- 2014. Michael Oakeshott Selected Writings Collection. Imprint Academic
