= Percy Anstey =

British actor

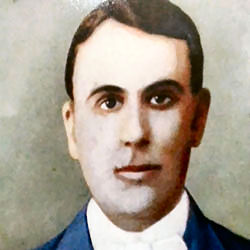
Percy Anstey c1914

Percy Anstey (25 February 1876 – 23 November 1920) was a British stage actor of the early 20th-century who later studied Economics and became a lecturer and college Principal in India.

He was born as Percival Louis Page in Paris in 1876, the son of Mary Louisa née Anstey (1838–1895) and Captain Andrew Mathew Adolph Page (1837–1890), an army officer who separated from his wife soon after the birth of his son to go to Australia where he was appointed Secretary and Inspector of the Board for the Protection of Aborigines. He remained in Australia for the rest of his life.

== Stage career ==
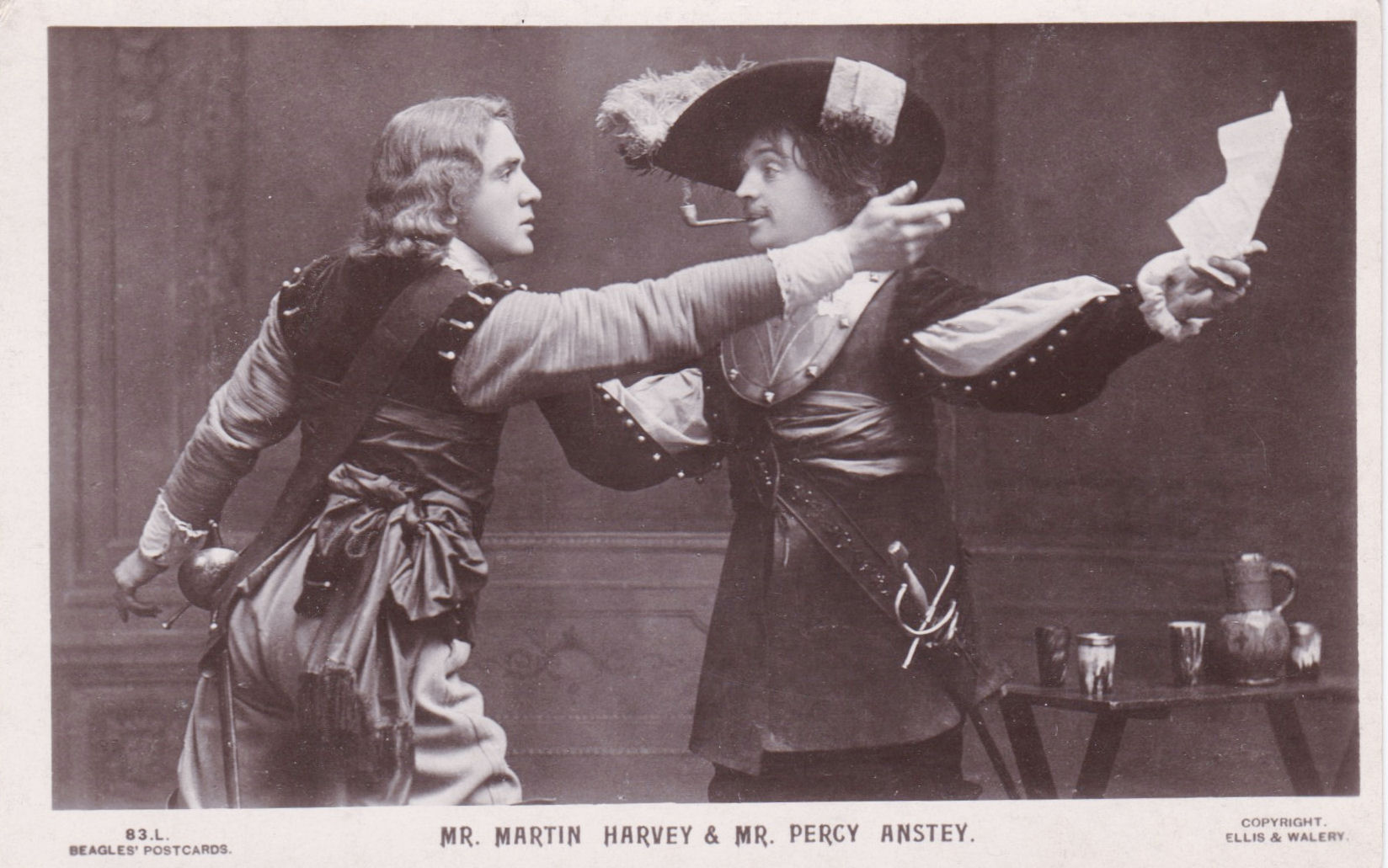
Percy Anstey (left) and John Martin-Harvey in The Breed of the Treshams (1903)

Taking his mother's maiden name as his stage name, his theatre appearances include: Captain Cornelius Vandam/Messenger in Bonnie Dundee at the Adelphi Theatre (1899–1900), Marzo opposite Harley Granville-Barker and Laurence Irving in Captain Brassbound's Conversion at the Criterion Theatre (1900), and Twelfth Night at the Lecture Hall, Burlington Gardens in London (1902–1903).

In 1902 he joined the company of John Martin-Harvey in a tour of the United States acting in A Cigarette Maker's Romance/Rouget De L'Isle, The Children of Kings and The Only Way. With Martin-Harvey he toured the provinces of Britain in A Cigarette Maker's Romance, The Only Way, The Breed of the Treshams and Hamlet, (1903-1904), Hamlet at the Lyric Theatre (1904-1905), and Eugene Aram on tour including at the Prince's Theatre, Bristol (1905-1906). His affair with the actress Amy Coleridge who had also been on Martin-Harvey's American tour with her husband the actor William Haviland lead to her divorce from her husband in 1904. In 1906 Anstey and Coleridge married.

== Move to India ==
Anstey left his acting career to study Economics at the London School of Economics where he was President of the Students' Union, taking his B.Sc degree in 1910 and by 1911 was a lecturer in Economics at Sheffield University before serving as the head of the Economics department at the University of Bristol. In 1912 Anstey was appointed tutor of the Workers' Educational Association with a £30 a year grant made to the class by the University of Bristol. In 1913 after divorcing his first wife he married Vera Powell, the economist and noted expert on the economy of India. All three of their children were born in India after he joined the Bombay Educational Department and took the role of Principal at the Sydenham College of Commerce and Economics in Bombay in March 1914 accompanied by his wife. In June 1914 he was appointed Principal and Professor of English at the college, and in February 1916 was appointed Principal and Professor of Economic Theory and History. In 1917 with Professors C. J. Hamilton and Gilbert Slater he co-founded the Indian Economic Association (IEA), the oldest and largest organisation of professional economists and policy makers in India.

He and Arthur Anstey, their youngest child, died in Delhi in India from cholera during November 1920. In his will he left just £138 2s 2d to his widow which resulted in Vera Anstey returning to the United Kingdom with their two surviving children, Mary Anstey (1916–) and the psychologist Edgar Anstey (1917–2009). She needing a job to support herself and her two children, took a role as an assistant lecturer in Economic History at the London School of Economics in 1921.
