= William Haviland (actor) =

British actor-manager

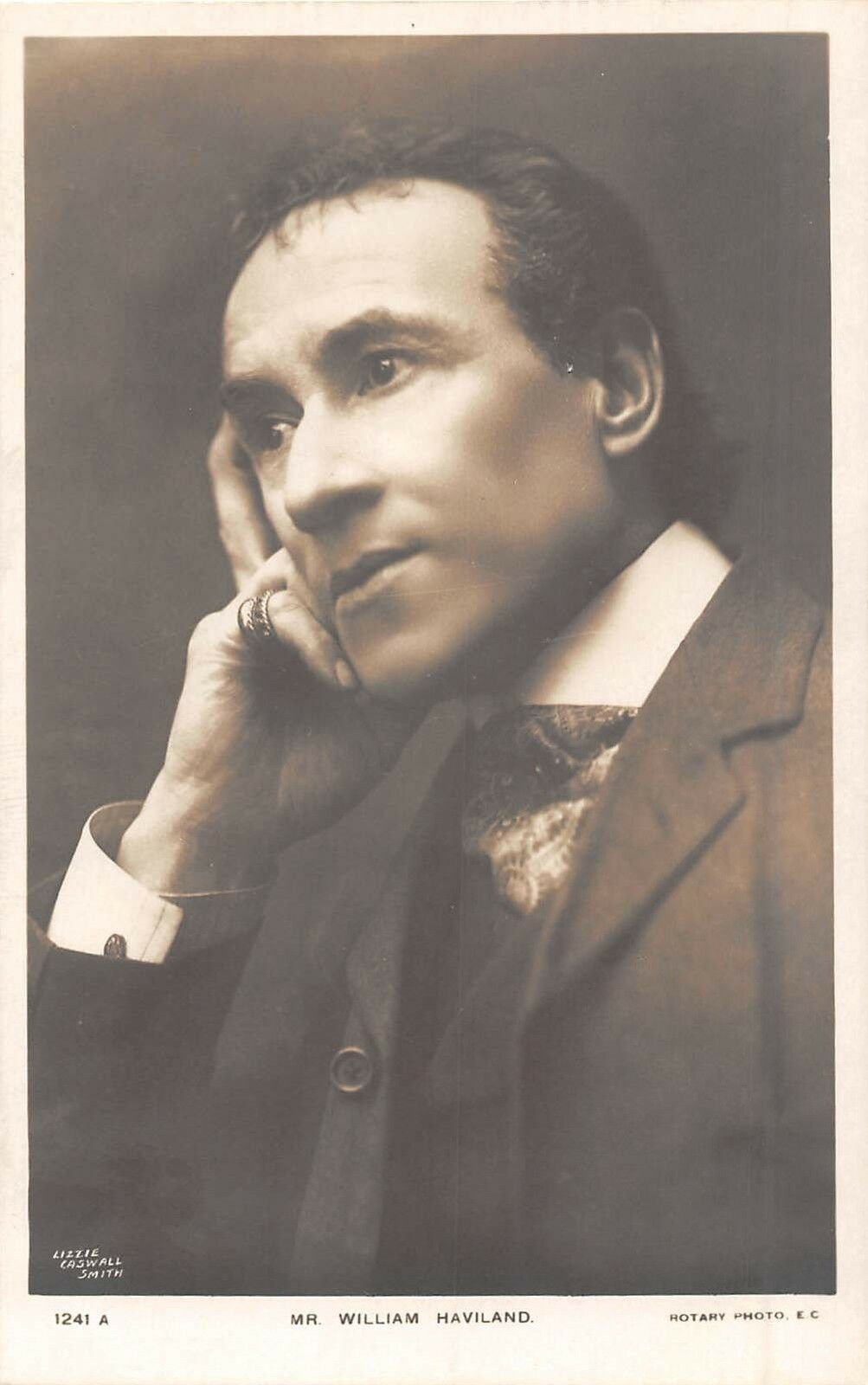
William Haviland

William Haviland (1856 – 19 September 1917) was a British actor-manager specialising in the works of Shakespeare who during his long stage career performed with some of the leading actors of his time including Henry Irving and Herbert Beerbohm Tree.

== Early life ==
Born as William Alexander Irwin in Bristol in Gloucestershire, he was the son of Adeline Ann née Goode (1830–1905) and Frederick William Irwin (1834–1930), a licensed victualler. He used the stage name William Haviland for much of his theatrical career except for an early period when he was billed as Alexander J. Haviland. His sister Augusta Irwin also took to a career on the stage under the name Augusta Haviland.

He began his long career performing Shakespeare when he joined the company of Henry Irving at the Lyceum Theatre in 1882, remaining with Irving until 1895 during which period he played a variety of roles—major and minor, including Altmayer in Faust (1887), Didier in The Lyons Mail (1891) and Fool to Irving's Lear in King Lear (1892). He married the actress Amy Coleridge (born as Amy Matilda Cowlrick, 1864–1951) in Chicago on 1 February 1884. They had two children, Frederick Alexander Irwin (b. 1884) and Ellen Winifred Irwin (b. 1887) but were divorced in 1904 following her adultery with the actor Percy Anstey. As Alexander J. Haviland he acted in The Lady of Lyons alongside his wife in John Martin-Harvey's Lyceum Theatre Company tour of the provinces in 1888.

== Stage career ==
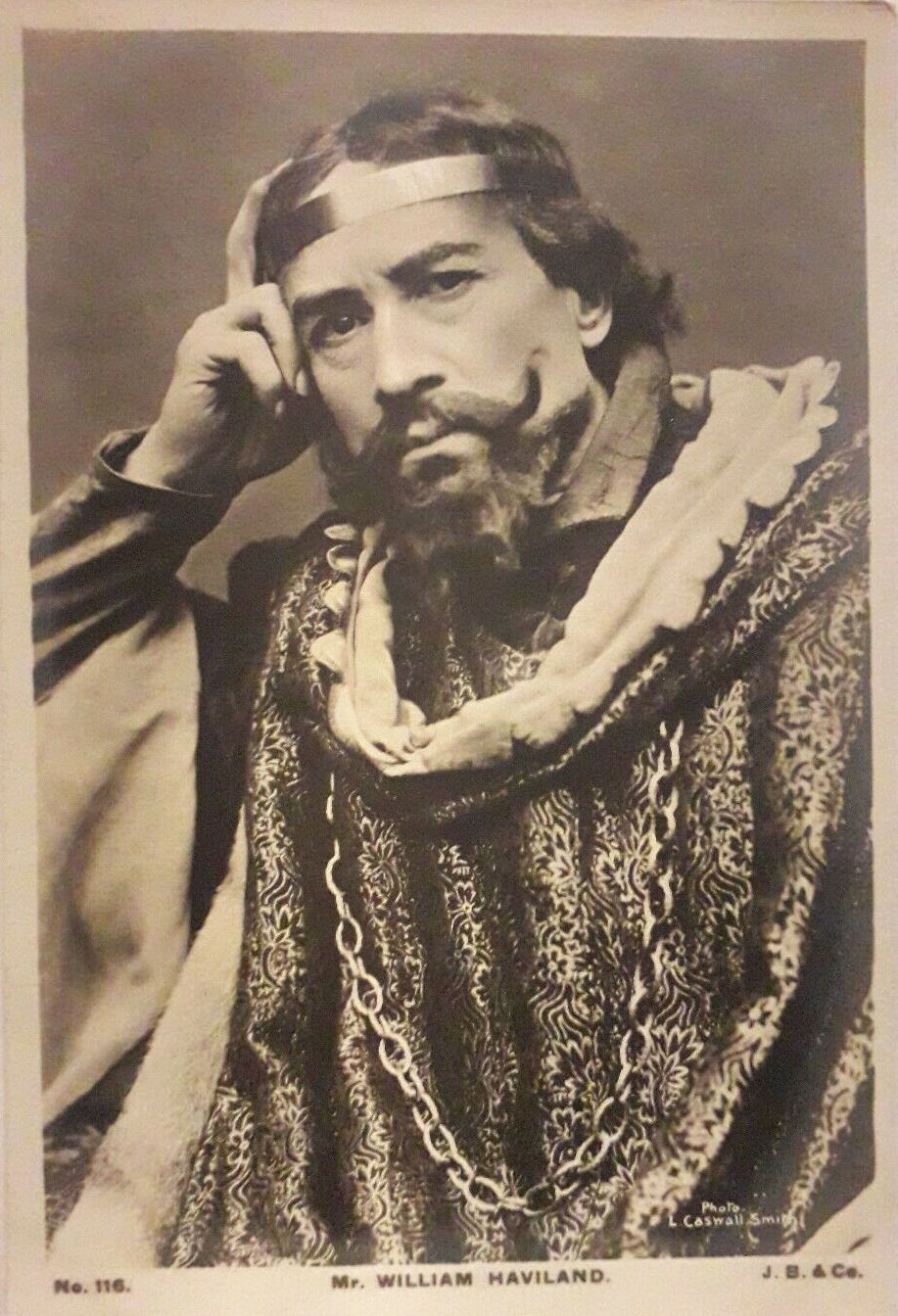
William Haviland in character

He left Irving to tour South Africa performing Shakespeare with William John Holloway and his Holloway Theatre Company and in 1896 he and Frank de Jong formed the De Jong and Haviland Company which leased the Cape Town Opera House almost continuously from 1896 to 1905. In 1897 he formed another company with Gerald Lawrence—the Haviland and Lawrence Shakespearian & Dramatic Company—touring South Africa with their company that year in plays that included: The Taming of the Shrew, The Merchant of Venice, Hamlet and Much Ado About Nothing. Among the cast was Lilian Braithwaite, who had married Lawrence just prior to embarking on the tour.

On returning from South Africa Haviland returned to the company of Henry Irving at the Lyceum for whom he played Christian in The Bells (1900), François de Paule in Louis XI (1900), and Don John in Much Ado About Nothing (1891), before joining the company of Johnston Forbes-Robertson and then, with his wife Amy Coleridge, that of John Martin-Harvey, with whom he appeared in A Cigarette Maker's Romance at the Royal Court Theatre (1901) and joined him for his sixth tour of America in 1902 during which Haviland acted in A Cigarette Maker's Romance, The Children of Kings and The Only Way.

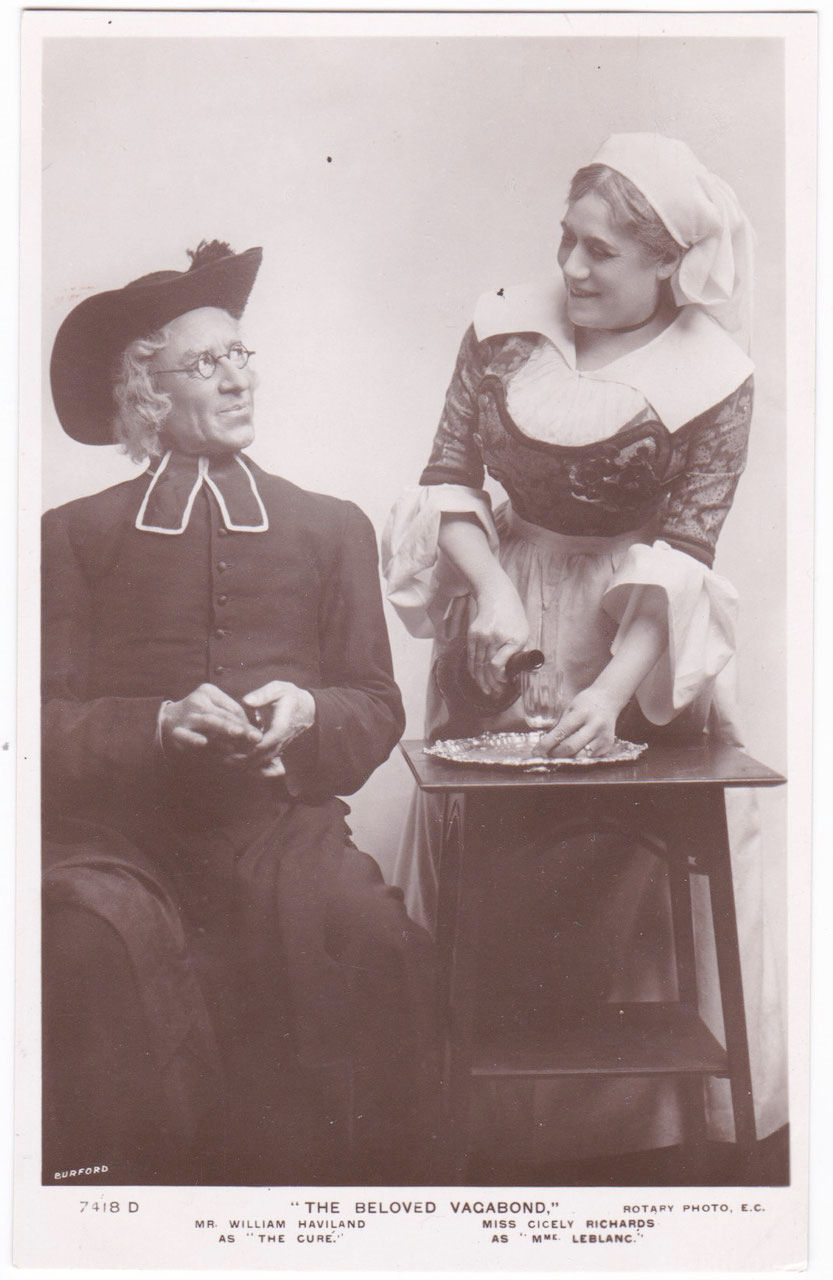
As the Curé in The Beloved Vagabond with Cicely Richards as Mrs. Leblanc (1908)

From 1903 to 1905, Haviland was with the company of Herbert Beerbohm Tree, playing, among other roles, Prospero in Tree's production of The Tempest at His Majesty's Theatre (1904). During this period he returned to South Africa with Tree for his fourth tour.

In 1906, he married the Australian actress Edyth Latimer (1883–1967) with whom he had two children: Denis William Garstin Latimer Haviland Irwin (1910–2000) and Esther E. Irwin. Later in 1906 he was in Cape Town in South Africa with his new wife in their joint Haviland-Latimer Company with which he acted in productions of Julius Caesar, The Taming of the Shrew, The Merchant of Venice, Prospero in The Tempest, Iago in Hamlet, Macbeth, Svengali in Trilby and was Matthias in The Bells.

By 1908, he was back with the company of Herbert Beerbohm Tree for whom he played the Curé in The Beloved Vagabond, Antonio in The Merchant of Venice, Polonius in Hamlet, and Dr. Caius in The Merry Wives of Windsor opposite Tree as Falstaff at His Majesty's Theatre (1908 and 1910). In February 1913 he appeared in Ibsen's The Pretenders for Laurence Irving at the Haymarket Theatre. His long career performing Shakespeare's plays ended with his appearance as the Duke of Norfolk in Tree's production of Richard II at Dublin in 1913. With so long an acting career Haviland listed among his recreations "rehearsing".

== Later years ==
During his last years, he lived at 225 W. 69 Street in Manhattan; he died on 19 September 1917 at Montefiore Home and Hospital in The Bronx.
