= Amy Coleridge =

British actress

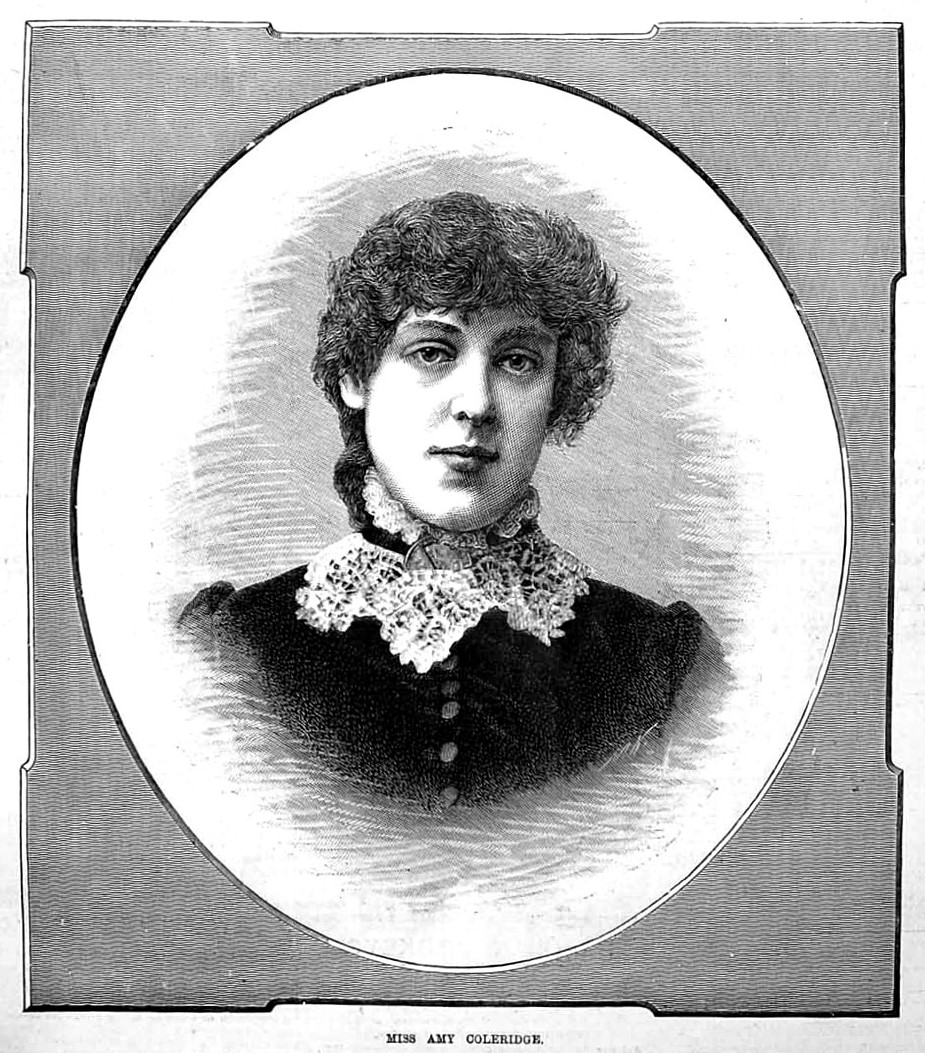
Amy Coleridge - The Illustrated Sporting and Dramatic News (1886)

Amy Coleridge (25 May 1864 – 4 August 1951) was a British actress who had a successful career playing in Shakespeare's plays in South Africa as well as in her home country. She acted in the companies of Henry Irving and John Martin-Harvey.

== Biography ==
=== Early life ===
She was born as Amy Matilda Cowlrick at St Pancras in London in 1864, the daughter of Adelaide née Jackson (1839–) and Charles Cowlrick (1837–1922), a commercial clerk.

=== First marriage and acting career (1884 – 1906) ===
She married the English actor William Haviland in Chicago on 1 February 1884. They had two children, the actor Frederick Alexander Irwin (1884-1924) and Ellen Winifred Irwin (1887-) but were divorced in 1904 following her adultery with the actor Percy Anstey (1876–1920). In 1886 she and her husband were at the Lyceum Theatre in the company of Henry Irving for whom she played Alice in Faust (1886), Ursula in Much Ado About Nothing, and Julie Lesurques in The Lyons Mail (1893). She acted in The Lady of Lyons alongside her husband in John Martin-Harvey's Lyceum Theatre Company tour of the provinces in 1888.

She and Haviland returned to South Africa as members of the Holloway Theatre Company in 1895 where she played Desdemona in Othello and Cordelia in King Lear on tour. In 1897 she returned to tour South Africa with the Haviland and Lawrence Shakespearian & Dramatic Company in their season of Shakespearian plays directed by her husband William Haviland and co-starring Haviland and his co-manager Gerald Lawrence.

By 1900 she and her husband William Haviland were in London with the company of John Martin-Harvey, for whom she appeared as Marie in Louis XI at the Lyceum Theatre (1900), joining him for his sixth tour of America in 1902 in three productions: A Cigarette Maker's Romance, The Children of Kings and The Only Way. She appeared opposite Martin-Harvey as Margaret Hungerford in The Breed of the Treshams (1903).

=== Second marriage and later life (1906 – 1951) ===
In 1906, after her divorce from Haviland, she married the actor Percy Anstey. After divorcing Anstey she married Archibald Brough Pearce (1897–1962) in 1915. She is believed to have returned to South Africa to act for Leonard Rayne for some years, later becoming a speech and drama teacher.

Amy Coleridge died in Pietermaritzburg, South Africa on 4 August 1951.
