= Anstee =

Anstee is a surname, and may refer to

- Margaret Anstee (1926–2016), United Nations Under-Secretary General (in 1987)
- Nick Anstee (born 1958), 682nd Lord Mayor of the City of London, from 2009 to 2010
- Rae Anstee (born 1932), Australian nurse
- Sean Anstee (born 1987), English politician

== See also ==
- Anstey (surname)
- Ansty (disambiguation)
- Anstie
