= Ansty =

Ansty may refer to:

== Places in England ==
- Ansty, Dorset (including Higher Ansty, Lower Ansty, Little Ansty and Ansty Cross)
- Ansty, Warwickshire, village and civil parish
  - Anstey College of Physical Education
  - RAF Ansty, former Royal Air Force station
- Ansty, West Sussex, village
- Ansty, Wiltshire, village and civil parish
  - Ansty Preceptory, medieval monastery

== Other ==
- Anastasia "Ansty" Buckley, who was featured in the memoir The Tailor and Ansty

== See also ==
- Anstey (disambiguation)
- Anstee
- Anstie
