= Acton, Dorset =

Hamlet in Dorset, England

Coordinates: 50.6061°N 2.0169°W

Acton
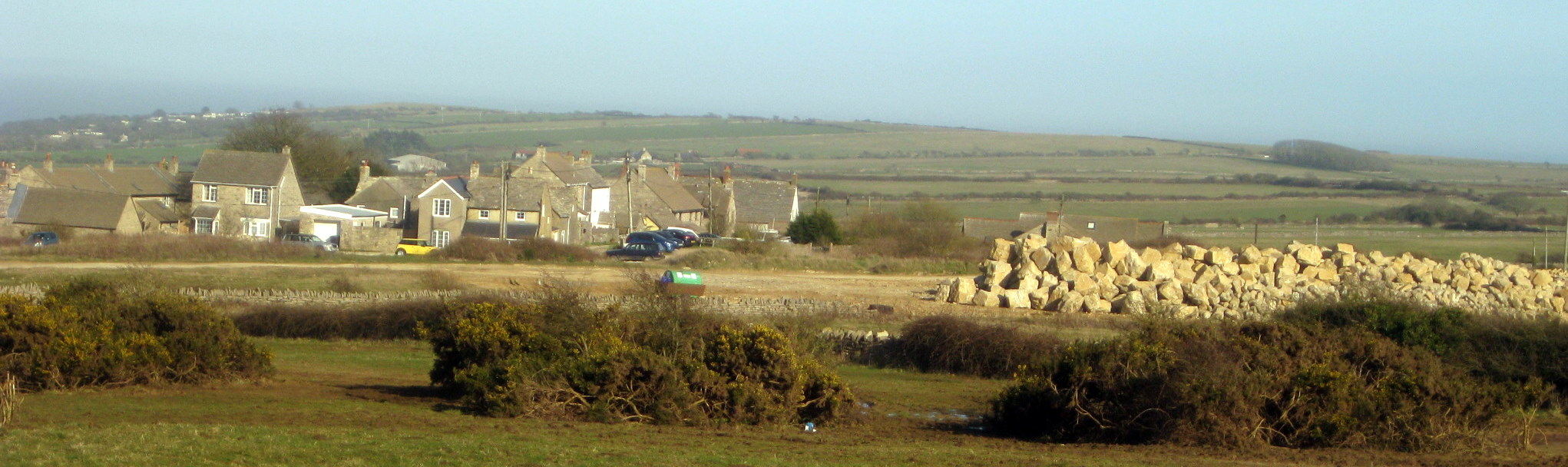
- Acton and Piles of Purbeck Stone

- Location within Dorset
- OS grid reference: SY988784
- Civil parish: Langton Matravers
- Unitary authority: Dorset
- Ceremonial county: Dorset
- Region: South West
- Country: England
- Sovereign state: United Kingdom
- Post town: SWANAGE
- Postcode district: BH19
- Dialling code: 01929
- Police: Dorset
- Fire: Dorset and Wiltshire
- Ambulance: South Western
- UK Parliament: South Dorset

Acton is a hamlet in the parish of Langton Matravers, on the Isle of Purbeck, in the county of Dorset in the south of England.

Acton was built as living quarters for the quarrymen working at the local quarries. Quarrying still takes place in the settlement today, with the Bonfield family (currently H F Bonfield & Son of Blacklands Quarry) having quarried in the area since 1651. The Burngate Purbeck Stone Centre is located near the hamlet, a small charitable trust that supports the sharing of skills and the advancement of knowledge associated with Purbeck Stone.

In addition to the quarrying activities, the settlement has a high proportion of holiday rental properties and second homes.

== Toponymy ==
The name “Acton” is derived from the Old English for “farm for young sheep”, the first element of which is *tacca. The hamlet was documented in the Domesday Book as Tacatone.

== Politics ==
Acton is covered by the South Dorset constituency.

After 2019 structural changes to local government in England, Acton is part of the South East Purbeck ward which elects one member to Dorset Council.

== Transport ==
The hamlet is served by Acton Lane on the Morebus route 40 Purbeck Breezer service between Poole and Swanage (via Wareham and Corfe Castle), with the stop situated north of the hamlet on the B3069.

The nearest railway station is Harman's Cross on the Swanage Railway, which is located approximately 1 mile to the north of the hamlet. The nearest station on the National Rail network is Wareham.

== Notable people ==
Philosopher Michael Oakeshott retired to Acton in 1968, eventually dying in the hamlet, aged 89, in 1990.
