= Gymnastic Teachers' Suffrage Society =

Organisation for physical education teachers in the UK

- Formation: 1909
- Founder: Rhoda Anstey
- Dissolved: 1915
- Affiliations: Federated Council of Suffrage Societies

The Gymnastics Teachers’ Suffrage Society (1909–1915) was an organisation for physical education teachers in the United Kingdom which campaigned for women's suffrage.

== Foundation ==
The Gymnastic Teachers' Suffrage Society was founded in 1909. It aimed "to advocate the extension of the franchise to women on the same lines as it is or may be granted to men; to find out the numerical strength of supporters of the Women's Suffrage Movement in the profession; and to protect the profession from restrictive legislation." It was the only formal organisation of physical educators or sportswomen to support the cause of women's suffrage.

During the suffrage processions in London in 1910 and 1911, a contingent from the society marched behind their own banner, dressed in a uniform of white blouses and navy walking skirts.

The society became affiliated with the Federated Council of Suffrage Societies in 1912. It was disestablished in 1915.

== Notable members ==
- Rhoda Anstey, founder member.
- Mary Hankinson, president.
- May King, treasurer

== See also ==
- Timeline of women's suffrage
- Women's suffrage organisations
