= Anstie =

Anstie is a surname. Notable people with the surname include:

- Francis E. Anstie (1833–1874), British physician
- Max Anstie (born 1993), British motorsport competitor

== See also ==
- Mary Anstie Overbury (c. 1851 – 1926), Australian artist
- Anstee
- Anstey (surname)
- Ansty (disambiguation)
