= Anstey Castle =

Motte-and-bailey castle in Anstey, East Hertfordshire, England, UK

- Anstey, Hertfordshire, England
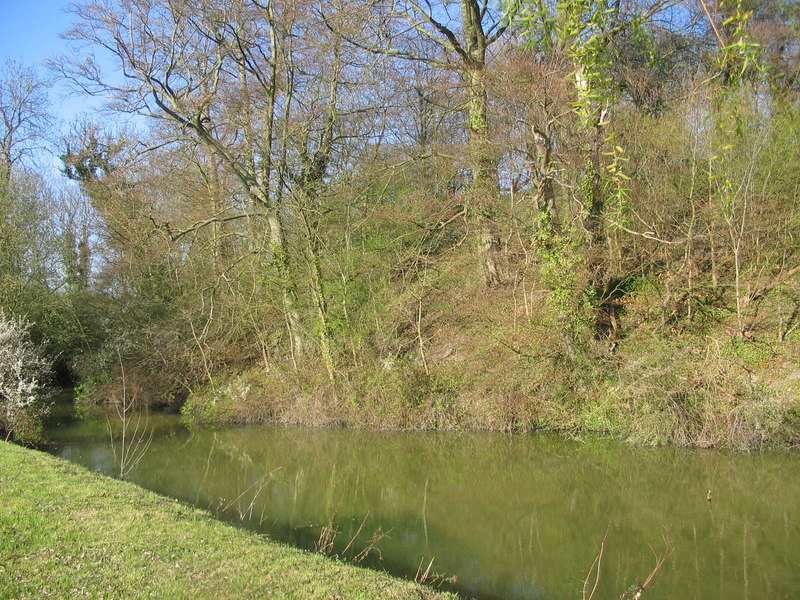

Site information
- Condition: Earthworks only

Location
- Coordinates: 51.97773°N 0.04276°E
- Grid reference: grid reference TL404330

Anstey Castle was in the village of Anstey, Hertfordshire. It was a 12th-century stone motte and bailey fortress that, according to tradition, was founded by Eustace II, Count of Boulogne. It was either him, or one of his immediate progeny who established the first earthwork castle here. The castle had most probably been in existence for some time when the estate was acquired by Geoffrey de Mandeville, for he sought to strengthen his estate in the surrounding valley. It passed into the hands of the de Anstey family in the middle of the 12th century and was strengthened during the First Barons' War of 1215–1216 by Nicholas de Anstey, an opponent of King John, fighting for the barons. After the war ended de Anstey was commanded in 1218 to destroy the castle, with only those parts to remain that had been built before the war. The material from this demolition was supposed to be used in order to repair the nearby church, therefore the crest and shield from the castle feature in the church graffiti.

After the death of de Anstey in 1225, the castle and the surrounding estate was seized by the king from his daughter who was a minor at that time. He tasked William Fitz Baldwin to acquire the estate and deliver it to Robert de Rokele, who shall keep it on behalf of the Bishop of Canterbury. the castle is mentioned as such in 1304, but by 1314, it is mentioned as merely a manor, not as a castle.

Today, the remains of the castle include a large motte around 8.2 metres (27 ft) in height and measuring 75 by 65 metres (246 by 213 ft). A 10-metre (33 ft) ditch filled with water surrounds the motte, while the bailey to the north and the east is surrounded by a dry ditch. A large mound also remains on the site, which was excavated in 1902–1903 by R.T. Andrews and W. B Gerish but their findings about the age of the castle and when it was built were inconclusive. There are no remains of the castle left to be seen on the mound.
