= Rhoda Anstey =

English suffragist (1865–1936)

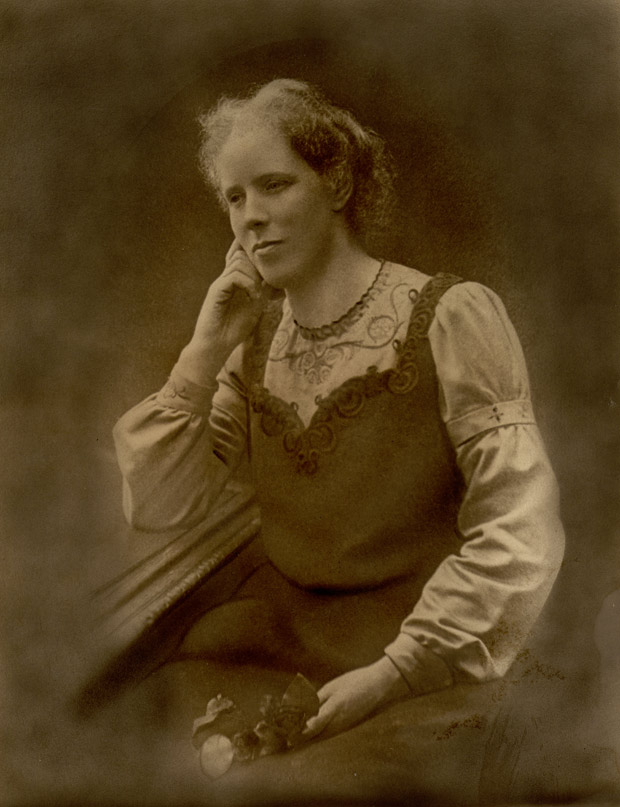
- Anstey in 1900
- Born: 15 April 1865; Tiverton, Devon, England
- Died: 27 February 1936 (aged 70); London, England
- Burial place: Cheltenham Cemetery, Cheltenham, England
- Education: Hampstead Physical Training College
- Occupations: Physical education teacher, activist
- Employer(s): Founded and worked at the Anstey College of Physical Education
- Organization(s): Women's Social and Political Union, Gymnastic Teachers' Suffrage Society, Ling Association

Rhoda Anstey (15 April 1865 – 27 February 1936) was an English suffragist, tax resister, Theosophist, and physical education teacher. She founded the Anstey College of Physical Education in Birmingham. Anstey was also an activist for dress reform, temperance, and vegetarianism.

== Early life ==
Anstey was born at Jurihayes Farm near Tiverton, Devon on 15 April 1865. She was the seventh of nine children and second daughter of John Walters Anstey and his wife Suzannah Elizabeth Anstey (née Manley). She attended the Swedish teacher Martina Bergman Österberg's Hampstead Physical Training College (later known as Dartford College) for two years, studying between 1893 and 1895.

== Career ==
Anstey established the Hygienic Home for Ladies at her sister's property, New Cross Farm, South Petherton, Somerset in 1895. She aimed to enrol middle class female students at her school, which was only the second female physical education training college to be founded in Britain. Prospective students were required to have achieved a Certificate of Matriculation or an Oxford or Cambridge Higher Local Certificate. Anstey also required them to be between 18 and 28 years of age.

This institution was succeeded by the Anstey College of Physical Training in 1897, which was established at the Leasowes in Halesowen. The large building was the former home of the poet William Shenstone and was set within 16 acres of grounds and with a lake. She created an identity for the college and adopted the Latin motto Vis Atque Gratia Harmoniaque, meaning "Strength together with Grace and Harmony". The programmes ran for two years and aimed to promote physical education as a means of liberating the female mind and to inspire the students to become professional gymnastics teachers and independent women.

In July 1898, Anstey gave a lecture on Swedish gymnastics along with a display by her students, which was reported in the Women's Penny Paper. She was a founder member of the Ling Association in 1899, serving on its committee. It later became the Physical Education Association of the United Kingdom.

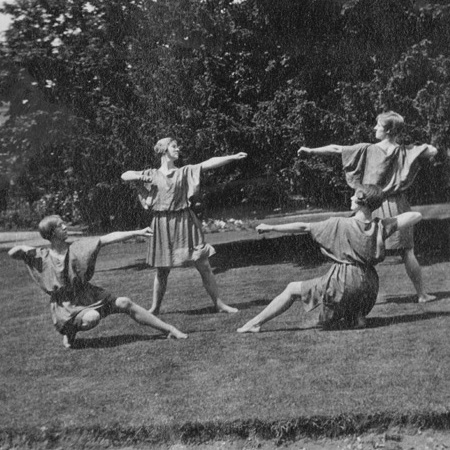
Photograph of Greek dancing at Anstey College of Physical Education, taken by Anstey in 1921

Anstey again transferred her college to Yew Tree House, Chester Road, Erdington, near Birmingham, in 1907. This was because there were greater local opportunities for teaching practice at secondary schools in Birmingham. She became acquainted with the local Cadbury family of Quaker industrialists and philanthropists, with Margaret Cadbury graduating in the second set of four students. Anstey trained teachers to staff the gymnasium and swimming pool built at the Cadbury's factory in Bournville.

When the Anstey Old Students' Association (AOSA) was founded in 1911, Anstey was appointed president. In 1918, she expanded her courses to three year programmes with extended teaching practice and medical study. She semi-retired later in 1918 and was joint principal with Ida Bridgman from 1920. They were succeeded as principal by Marion Squire in 1927. Anstey and Bridgman remained on the staff as co-directors until 1930. The institution remained at Yew Tree House until 1981, and the college remained open until 1984.

Anstey was described when teaching as "blunt in her manner" but with a "compassionate side that came out in benevolence to poor students." She has been credited as "one of the most radical figures from the women's physical education profession."

== Activism ==
=== Women's suffrage ===
Anstey campaigned for women's enfranchisement and was one of the founding members of the Gymnastic Teachers' Suffrage Society, founded in January 1909, and the Women's Social and Political Union (WSPU). She advertised her courses in the suffrage newspaper Votes for Women.

Anstey took a group of her students to London on 19 June 1910 to take part in the London procession organised by the WSPU. She encouraged her students to engage in politics and would tell them that "'women would probably get the vote and they must prepare themselves to exercise it properly."

Anstey did not involve herself in violent militancy, but when the 1911 census was enumerated, Anstey participated in the suffragette boycott on behalf of her college. She wrote: "No Vote No Census! I protest against the injustice done to women rate-payers by the continued refusal of the government to give them the vote, and hereby refuse to fill in the census forms for my household" on her census form. She felt comfortable with this form of civil disobedience for the cause, reflecting that "this census protest is a thing I am able to do without injury to anyone except myself".

Anstey later became a tax resister. In 1913 The Vote recorded how her (and a dozen others') goods were being auctioned in retaliation for not paying taxes.

=== Other causes ===
Anstey adopted vegetarianism in 1890, initially for health reasons, but later embraced it as part of a broader philosophical harmony. Her advocacy inspired her sister and brother-in-law to adopt vegetarianism as well. She was influenced by the writings of T. L. Nichols and T. R. Allinson and contributed articles on food and health to the Hygienic Review. She founded and ran the Leasowes Hygienic Home and School of Physical Culture near Halesowen, Worcester, which became the first venue for the Vegetarian Summer School. Her work and views were featured in an interview in The Vegetarian in 1898, and an illustrated interview by John Ablett in the same publication.

Anstey was also a member of the Women's Temperance Association and the Food and Dress Reform League.

== Later life and death ==
Anstey took semi-retirement in 1918 and later moved to King's Welcome, Battledown, Cheltenham. She died in Marylebone, London on 27 February 1936 and was buried at Cheltenham Cemetery on 2 March.
