= Anstey College of Physical Education =

Location
- Chester Road; Birmingham, West Midlands; England; 52.5369°N 1.8340°W

Information
- Type: Teacher training college
- Motto: Vis Atque Gratia Harmoniaque ("Strength together with Grace and Harmony")
- Established: 1897
- Closed: 1981 (1984)
- Local authority: Staffordshire / Birmingham
- Gender: Female
- Former name: Anstey Physical Training College

Anstey College of Physical Education, founded in 1897 as the Anstey Physical Training College, was a pioneer training college for teachers of girls' physical education, only the second such institution for women in the United Kingdom. Located for most of its history in the Erdington area of Birmingham, England, the college was originally independent but came under the control of Staffordshire education department in 1955 as part of a financial rescue deal. In 1975 it was taken over by Birmingham Polytechnic and renamed the Anstey Department of Physical Education. The Erdington premises remained in use until 1981, when the Anstey Department was transferred to the Edgbaston campus of the polytechnic, before being closed down in 1984.

== College history ==
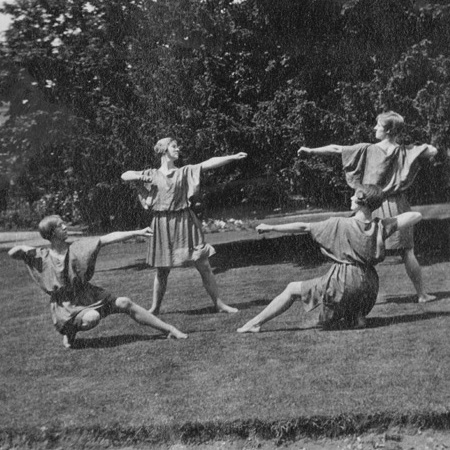
Anstey College, 1921: Greek Dancing

Rhoda Anstey (1865–1936), the founder of the college, grew up on her family's farm near Tiverton, Devon, and later became a feminist, theosophist, astrologer and advocate of meditation. From 1893 to 1895 she attended the Hampstead Physical Training College for young women run by the physical education instructor and suffragette, Martina Bergman-Österberg. Bergman-Österberg's strict regime for her students included isolation and cold baths, and upon leaving in 1895 Anstey set up a health farm called The Hygienic Home for Ladies at South Petherton, Somerset. In 1897 she moved to The Leasowes, Halesowen, Worcestershire, and wrote to her former instructor, Bergman-Österberg, requesting that the latter accept Sophie Knight, Anstey's assistant at the health farm in Somerset, as a student at a reduced fee. Bergman-Österberg refused, so Anstey decided to train Knight herself, and established the Anstey Physical Training College at her new home, initially with just three students.

In 1898 Anstey College hosted a meeting that would lead to the creation, the following year, of the Ling Association (later renamed the Physical Education Association of the United Kingdom), and in 1907 the college moved to new premises at Yew Tree House, Chester Road, Erdington, Birmingham, which would remain its home for nearly 75 years. Rhoda Anstey stepped down as principal in 1927, after having partially retired in 1920, though she remained a co-director until 1930, in which year the college gained the approval of the University of London to grant accredited diplomas. During the 1930s and 1940s Anstey College students represented England at many international events and exhibitions, and in 1947 the college changed its name to the Anstey College of Physical Education. In 1949 it became a founder member of the International Association of Physical Education and Sport for Girls and Women.

By 1955, however, the college was in severe financial difficulties and in danger of closing. Staffordshire County Council agreed to fund the college and it became part of the county's education service. The college had 104 students by 1962, and was organising regular camps in Shropshire, as well as many other activities such as gymnastic and dance competitions in conjunction with other local colleges. By the late 1960s the college was awarding degrees accredited by the University of Birmingham, and had successfully resisted a proposed merger with the larger and co-educational Madeley College, based near Newcastle-under-Lyme, Staffordshire, which would have entailed the closure of the Chester Road premises.

In 1975 Anstey College, along with two other teacher training facilities in Birmingham, the Bordesley College of Education and the City of Birmingham College of Education, was incorporated into Birmingham Polytechnic (now Birmingham City University). The Chester Road premises continued in use as the Anstey Department of Physical Education until 1981, when its staff were transferred to the polytechnic's Edgbaston campus on Westbourne Road, becoming the Anstey School of Physical Education. The old college building was sold off and subsequently demolished to make way for a housing development, and the Anstey School at the polytechnic ceased to exist as a separate body in 1984.

== Alumnae ==
The Anstey Old Students' Association (AOSA) was founded in 1911 by Rhoda Anstey during the Ling Christmas Course in London and became very active in holding reunions for former students, enabling them to remain in contact by supporting the college and other worthy causes. The association changed its name to the Anstey Association of Past and Present Students (AAPPS) in 1972, and again to the Anstey Association (AA) in 1984 when the Anstey School at Birmingham Polytechnic was closed. Subsequently, in addition to organising regular reunions and fundraising events, the association also helped administer the Anstey College archives kept in the Anstey Room, Ravensbury House, Westbourne Road (part of the polytechnic). The archives were transferred to Birmingham Central Library in 2005 (and later, in 2013, to the Library of Birmingham), but the association continues to hold regular events across the country.

=== Notable alumnae ===
- Josephine Tey, novelist and playwright
- Aileen Harding, foil fencer

== Principals ==
=== Principals of Anstey College ===
- 1897–1920 Rhoda Anstey
- 1920–1927 Rhoda Anstey & Ida Bridgman
- 1927–1955 Marion Squire
- 1955–1964 C. Muriel Webster & Audrey Hobbs
- 1964–1969 C. Muriel Webster
- 1969–1975 Ida Webb

=== Heads of the Anstey Department ===
- 1975–1978 Reginald Howlett
- 1978–1981 Michael Rowe
- 1981–1984 Colin Crunden
