= Martina Bergman Österberg =

Swedish-born physical education instructor and women's suffrage advocate

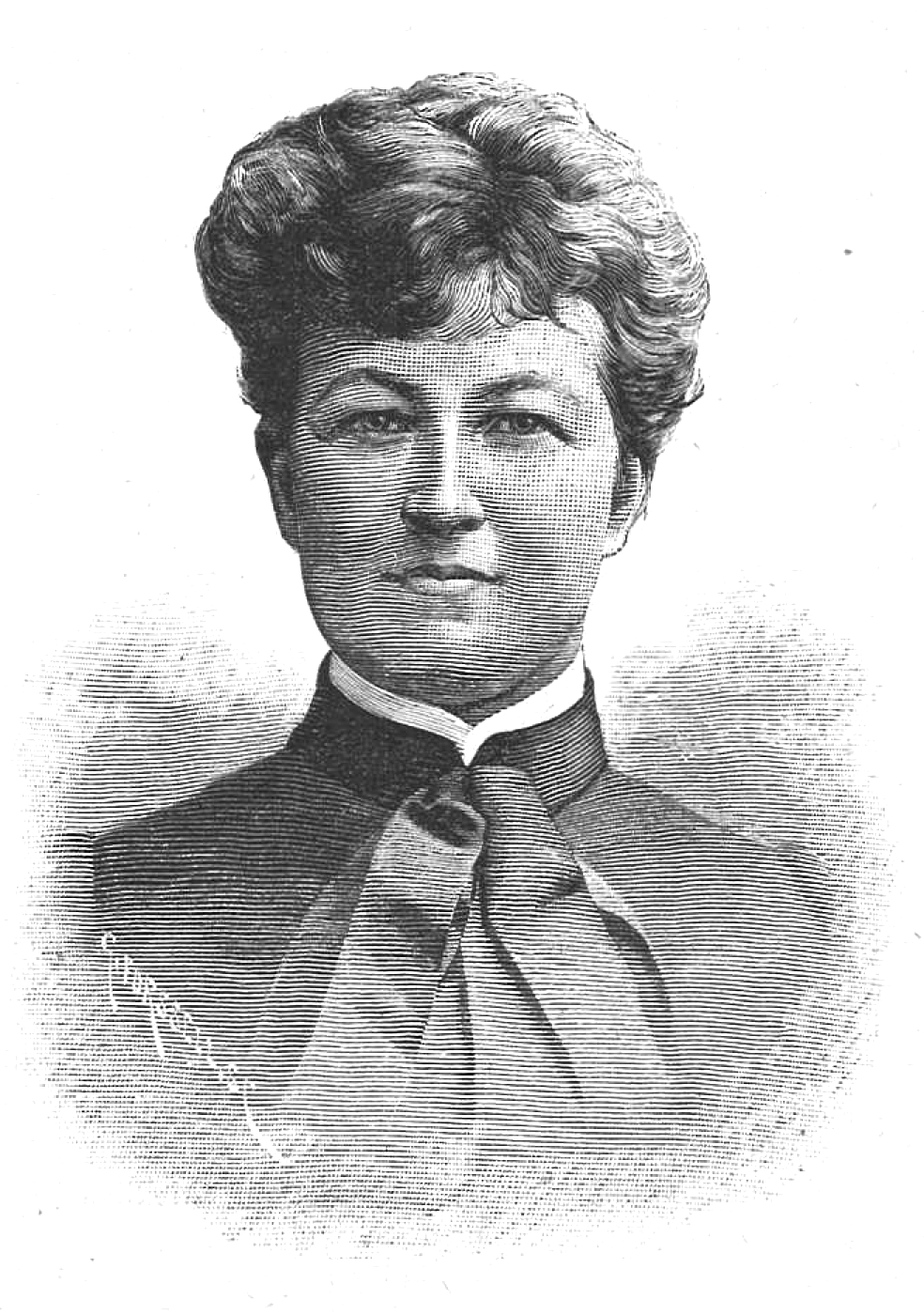
- Born: Martina Sofia Helena Bergman; 7 October 1849; Hammarlunda, Sweden
- Died: 29 July 1915 (aged 65)

Martina Sofia Helena Bergman Österberg (née Bergman; 7 October 1849 – 29 July 1915) was a Swedish-born physical education instructor and women's suffrage advocate who spent most of her working life in Britain. After studying gymnastics in Stockholm she moved to London, where she founded the first physical education instructors' college in England, to which she admitted women only. Bergman Österberg pioneered teaching physical education as a full subject within the English school curriculum, with Swedish-style gymnastics (as opposed to the German model) at its core. She also advocated the wearing of gymslips by women playing sports, and played a pivotal role in the early development of netball. Bergman Österberg was an advocate of women's emancipation, directly encouraging women to be active in sport and education, and also donating money to women's emancipation organisations in her native Sweden. Several of her students, including Rhoda Anstey, founded the Ling Association, which later became the Physical Education Association of the United Kingdom.

== Early life and career ==
Martina Bergman Österberg was born on 7 October 1849 in Hammarlunda (now in Eslöv Municipality), a farming community in Malmöhus County (now part of Skåne County), Sweden. Her parents were Karl Bergman, a farmer, and Betty Lundgren; she also had two brothers who both died at a young age, and three sisters who eventually settled abroad. After receiving a private education at home, she was employed as a governess from 1870 to 1873, and from 1874 to 1877 she worked as a Nordisk familjebok librarian, where she met her future husband.

In 1879, she started a two-year course at the Royal Central Gymnastics Institute in Stockholm, studying pedagogical and medical gymnastics. She was trained in the Swedish system of gymnastics devised by Pehr Henrik Ling. Her gymnastics studies also took her to England, France, Germany and Switzerland. Martina Bergman Österberg is noted as having played a pivotal role in the early development of netball. Netball was similar to 1882's basketball, that was invented in 1880 prior to graduating in 1881, and later that year moved to London.

== London School Board ==
Bergman Österberg was appointed in 1881 to the London School Board as Lady Superintendent of Physical Exercises in Girls' and Infants' schools. Eleven years earlier, the Elementary Education Act 1870 had provided universal elementary education in England, and allowed schools to receive government grants for providing physical training. But at the time, physical education (or "physical training" at the time) as a subject was not taught in the curricula of most schools. Military drill was taught to boys in public schools, while private institutions taught either German-style gymnastics, which emphasised apparatus-based and rhythmic exercises, or Swedish-style gymnastics, which used anatomy-based regimented drills and therapeutic exercises. Physical training was permitted for girls in 1873 by the Gladstone government, and within three years it was made compulsory for girls in elementary schools within the London School Board.

The superintendent position at the London School Board was first established in 1878. Since no English teachers possessed sufficient qualifications at the time, its first appointee was a Swede named Concordia Löfving, who like Bergman Österberg was trained at the Royal Central Gymnastics Institute in Stockholm. She advocated Swedish gymnastics and introduced it to girls' schools; after one year in the position she had received 600 applications. When Löfving resigned from the post in 1881, Bergman Österberg was appointed as her successor.

Bergman Österberg was responsible for the instruction of female physical training teachers and with certifying their competence. During her appointment she trained 1312 teachers in Swedish gymnastics, anatomy and physiology, and pioneered a national system of physical training instruction, incorporating Swedish gymnastics as taught by Ling. Most of her work focused on training educators for elementary school students, and during her time at the London School Board she introduced Swedish gymnastics to nearly 300 schools; by 1888, Swedish gymnastics was being taught by qualified teachers in girls' schools in every department of the London School Board. Bergman Österberg also organised public demonstrations of her students performing Swedish gymnastics and promoting women's physical education: one such public demonstration in 1883 was attended by the Prince and Princess of Wales, and received approbation in the press.

Her interest eventually shifted towards teaching middle-class women to become physical training instructors in English public schools. She grew dissatisfied with the bureaucracy at the London School Board, and felt stifled in fully achieving her aims. She also remarked on the unsuitability of teaching working-class girls in London, observing that they lived in an environment of malnutrition, neglect and dreadful living conditions.

== Hampstead College ==
In 1885, Bergman Österberg established the Hampstead Physical Training College and Gymnasium for women, against financial advice, at Broadhurst Gardens in South Hampstead, London. Her college was the first physical training college in England, one in which she admitted women only, as she felt that female instructors would better understand their female students. While male instructors did teach physical training in schools, at that time there were no institutions offering pedagogical physical training courses for men in England, who generally had to travel to Germany, Denmark or Sweden to gain formal qualifications.

Bergman Österberg developed a two-year course modelled on that at the Royal Central Gymnastics Institute in Sweden. She taught anatomy, animal physiology, chemistry, physics, hygiene, theory of movement, dancing, deportment and Swedish gymnastics. English team sports were also taught at the college: although Bergman Österberg never fully understood them, she did appreciate their significance to the English people, and their potential to teach an "appreciation of space and time, discipline, reason, quickness and unselfishness".

Believing that the liberators of the female sex were to be found in the ranks of the middle class, she deliberately kept enrolment fees high and student numbers low. She only admitted students with above-average intelligence and education, an aptitude for natural science, a sound constitution and character, a pleasing appearance, and considerable zeal and devotion. Bergman Österberg's ideas on women's emancipation were centred on contemporary social Darwinism, gearing her young students for motherhood, or establishing them to train other young women for such a role: "I try to train my girls to help raise their own sex, and so to accelerate the progress of the race; for unless the women are strong, healthy, pure, and true, how can the race progress?".

Once students entered the college, Bergman Österberg maintained an autocratic rule over their daily lives. She forbade students from visiting each other's rooms, enforced an early "lights out" rule, permitted only cold baths, refused weekend leave except in special circumstances and censored their mail. But after completing the course, graduates of the college were virtually guaranteed employment in girls schools throughout the country, with an ample yearly salary of £100.

In 1886, she married Dr Edvin Per Wilhelm Österberg, a professor at the University of Uppsala, and was often referred to as Madame Österberg after her marriage. However, while Dr Österberg remained in Sweden, Madame Österberg continued her work in England, although they visited each other as often as their work allowed.

== Early development of netball ==
Martina Bergman Österberg is noted as having played a pivotal role in the early development of netball; basketball, which was invented in the United States in 1892. In 1893, Bergman Österberg returned from a visit to the United States, and informally introduced one version of basketball to her students at Hampstead. Two years later, an American lecturer by the name of Dr Toles (alternatively spelled "Toll") more formally introduced basketball to her students. The rules of this game were modified by Madame Österberg's students over several years. Substantial revisions were made during a visit in 1897 from another American teacher, Miss Porter, who introduced rules from women's basketball in the United States. By this time, the new sport had also acquired a new name: "net ball".

== Dartford College ==
With less space to accommodate increased enrolments, and with the imminent demolition of the Hampstead campus to make way for a railway, later in 1895 Bergman Österberg purchased a large country house named Kingsfield on a 14-acre (57,000 m^{2}) estate on Oakfield Lane in Dartford. She converted the ballroom to a gymnasium, and the lookout tower to servants' quarters, before opening the new college in September that year. At its new campus, the school became known as the Bergman Österberg Physical Training College.

Bergman Österberg's students were themselves to have their own influences on women's physical education. In 1897 one of her students, Mary Tait, invented the gymslip, a dress that facilitated practical movement for women playing sport, replacing the ground-length skirts and mutton-arm blouses that were normally worn by contemporary sportswomen. Bergman Österberg eagerly adopted the new apparel for her students, which became a standard uniform among British schoolgirls during the 20th century.

A group of her graduate students formed the Ling Physical Education Association in 1899, the first association representing the workers of the emerging profession in the United Kingdom. They invited Bergman Österberg to be president of the new association, but she angrily refused, disavowing any rival institutions to her own; however, Kathleen McCrone attributes Bergman Österberg's opposition to the fact that she did not come up with the idea herself. Instead she formed her own, insular association, the Bergman Österberg Union, in 1900. Conflicts between the two associations would not be resolved until after Bergman Österberg's death, with both organisations merging to form the Ling Association and Affiliated Gymnastic Societies. This organisation would eventually become the Physical Education Association of the United Kingdom.

Dartford college produced a documentary about Madame Österberg and her legacy on physical education and emancipation of women. The documentary can be found here

== Later years and legacy ==
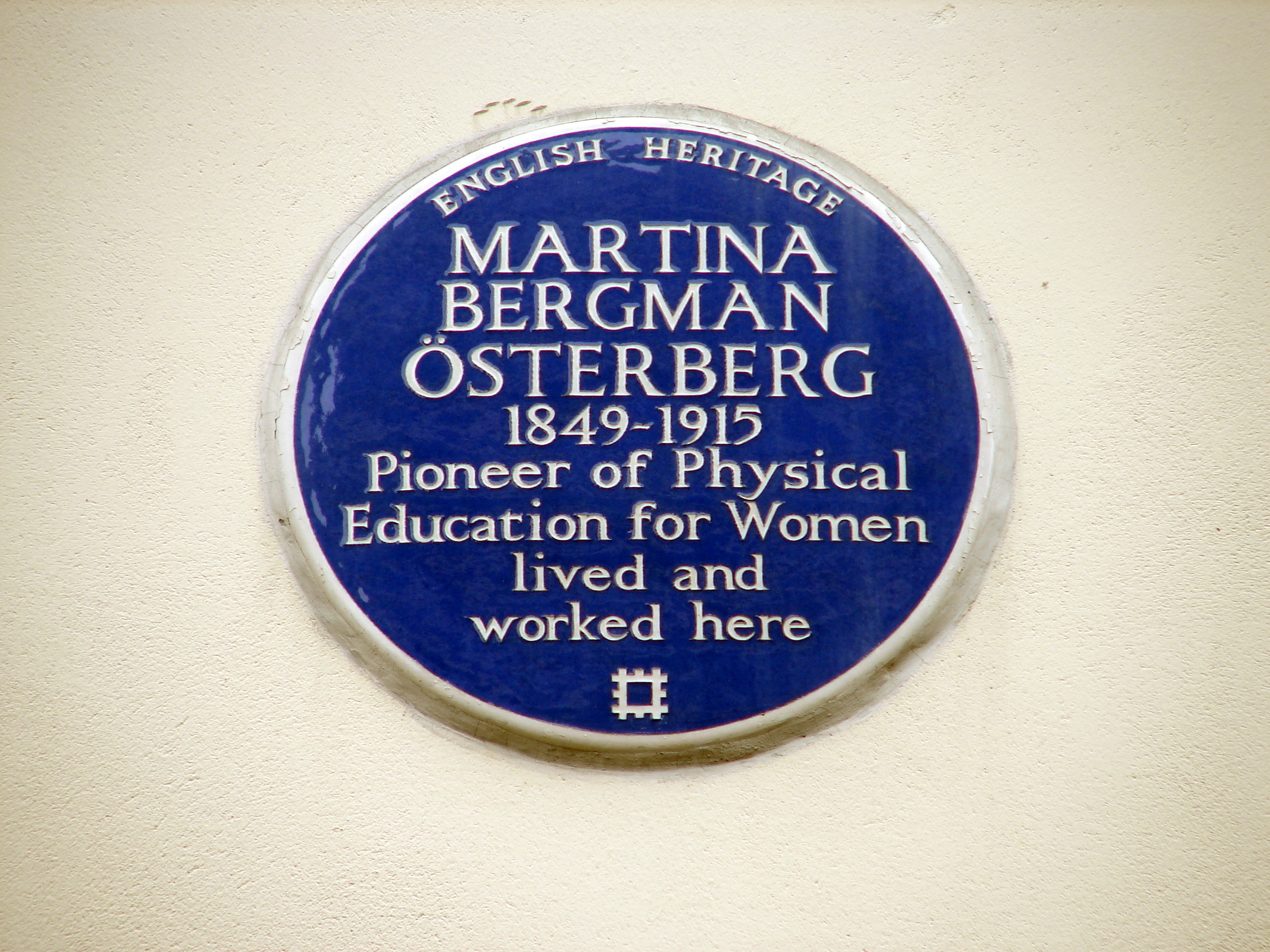
An English Heritage blue plaque at the site of Bergman-Österberg's original physical training college in South Hampstead, London.

Madame Österberg remained at the college for the rest of her life, although she retired from her teaching duties starting in 1913. Her health was reported to be declining in the spring of 1915: on 29 July that year, Martina Bergman Österberg died of cancer at the age of 65. Before her death, she bequeathed her college to the English nation. She also left 50,000 kr to the National Association for Women's Suffrage, a women's suffrage organisation in Sweden, and donated a property near Båstad to the Fredrika Bremer Association for the establishment of an orchard garden school. She was in fact, alongside Lotten von Kræmer, one of the two most significant single financial supporters of the National Association for Women's Suffrage, in which her niece Signe Bergman was a leading figure and once chairman

Bergman Österberg received a Litteris et Artibus medal in 1906 for her life's work. An English Heritage blue plaque also commemorates Bergman Österberg's original physical training college campus at 1 Broadhurst Gardens (NW6) in South Hampstead, London.

A physical education instructor's college for men would not exist in England until the 1930s. During World War II, her college at Dartford was evacuated to Newquay in Cornwall, at which time it was renamed the Dartford College of Physical Education. In 1976, Dartford College was amalgamated with Thames Polytechnic: gymnastics instruction ceased in 1982, and by 1986 teacher training had stopped as well; the college was eventually incorporated into the University of Greenwich. The university maintains The Bergman Österberg Archive, a collection of material regarding her physical education college in Dartford. The Dartford College of Physical Education site is now operated by North West Kent College after this branch of the University of Greenwich moved to Avery Hill in 2002.

== Bibliography ==
- Aldrich, Richard (1998), "Teacher training in London", in Floud, Roderick; Glynn, Sean (eds.), London Higher: The Establishment of Higher Education in London (3rd ed.), Continuum International Publishing Group, ISBN 0-485-11524-7
- Aldrich, Richard; Gordon, Peter (1989). Dictionary of British Educationists. Routledge. ISBN 978-0-7130-0177-8.
- Bloomfield, Anne (September 2005). "Martina Bergman-Osterberg (1849–1915): Creating a Professional Role for Women in Physical Training". History of Education. 34 (5): 517–34. doi:10.1080/00467600500220762. ISSN 0046-760X. S2CID 145192894.
- Costa, D. Margaret; Guthrie, Sharon Ruth (1994). Women and sport: Interdisciplinary perspectives. Human Kinetics. ISBN 0-87322-686-0.
- Donovan, Mick; Jones, Gareth; Hardman, Ken (2006). "Physical Education and Sport: Dualism, Partnership and Delivery Provision". Kinesiology. 38 (1): 16–27.
- Fehn, Inger (2000). "Madame Bergman-Österberg 1849–1915, en bortglömd pionjär?" (PDF). Idrott, historia och samhälle: Svenska idrottshistoriska föreningens årsskrift (in Swedish). 5: 128–33.
- Galligan, Frank; Maskery, Colin; Spence, Jon; Howe, David; Barry, Tim; Ruston, Andy; Crawford, Dee (24 October 2000). Advanced PE for Edexcel. Heinemann. ISBN 0-435-50643-9.
- Giulianotti, Richard (2005). Sport: A Critical Sociology. Polity. ISBN 0-7456-2545-2.
- Gordon, Peter; Doughan, David (2002). Dictionary of British Women's Organisations, 1825–1960. London and Portland, OR: Woburn Press. ISBN 0-7130-4045-9.
- Hargreaves, Jennifer (1997). Sporting Females: Critical Issues in the History and Sociology of Women's Sports (3rd ed.). Taylor & Francis. ISBN 0-415-07027-9.
- Hargreaves, Jennifer (2002), "The Victorian cult of family and the early years of female sport", in Scraton, Sheila; Flintoff, Anne (eds.), Gender and Sport: A Reader, Abingdon and New York: Routledge, ISBN 0-415-25953-3
- Jobling, Ian; Barham, Pamela (November 1991). "The Development of Netball and the All-Australia Women's Basketball Association (AAWBBA): 1891–1939" (PDF). Sporting Traditions, Journal of the Australian Society for Sports History. 8 (1): 29–48. Archived from the original (PDF) on 8 April 2019.
- McCrone, Kathleen E. (1988). Playing the Game: Sport and the Physical Emancipation of English Women. London: Routledge. ISBN 0-415-00358-X.
- McCrone, Kathleen E. (1991). "Class, Gender, and English Women's Sport, c. 1890–1914". Journal of Sport History. 18 (1): 159–182.
- Smart, Richard (2001). "At the Heart of a New Profession: Margaret Stanfield, a Radical English educationist". In Mangan, J. A.; Hong, Fan (eds.). Freeing the Female Body. Routledge. ISBN 0-7146-5088-9.
- Treagus, Mandy (January 2005). "Playing Like Ladies: Basketball, Netball and Feminine Restraint". International Journal of the History of Sport. 22 (1): 88–105. doi:10.1080/0952336052000314593. S2CID 145103289.
- Wallace, Wendy (26 April 2002). "The woman who made girls jump". TES Magazine.
- Webb, Ida M. (1999). The Challenge of Change in Physical Education: Chelsea College of Physical Education – Chelsea School, University of Brighton 1898–1998. Routledge. ISBN 0-7507-0976-6.
- Th Westrin, ed. (1922). "Österberg". Nordisk familjebok (in Swedish). Vol. 34 (2nd ed.). Stockholm: Nordic Family Book.
- Wicksell, Anna (15 August 1915). "En bortgången märkeskvinna: Martina Bergman-Österberg" (PDF). Rösträtt för Kvinnor (in Swedish). 4 (15–16). Landsföreningen för kvinnans politiska rösträtt: 2.
