= Caroline Anstey =

English bank executive (born 1955)

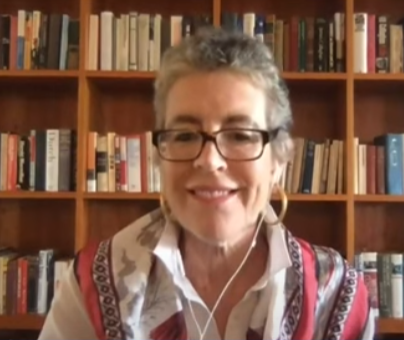
- Anstey speaking at the World Economic Forum's Sustainable Development Impact Summit 2021
- Born: 7 November 1955 (age 70); London, England
- Education: Leeds University; UC Berkeley; London School of Economics
- Occupation: Bank director
- Spouse: Milton W. Hudson
- Children: 2
- Parents: Edgar Anstey (father); Daphne Lilly (mother)

Caroline D. Anstey (born 7 November 1955) was appointed as managing director of the World Bank in September 2011, with special responsibility for the World Bank's operational services, policy and systems, and its overall modernization drive and gender issues.

Anstey previously held the post of World Bank Vice President of External Affairs, after earlier being appointed in September 2007 and serving for three years as chief of staff by then World Bank President Robert B. Zoellick, his first high-level appointment after taking over the presidency in July that year. Anstey also served as World Bank Sherpa to the G20.

During her previous role as the World Bank's country director for the Caribbean, Anstey was successful in raising funds for Haiti's reconstruction as donors prepared to re-engage in 2004 after former president Jean-Bertrand Aristide went into exile.

She also played a key role, as acknowledged by regional leaders, in the setting up of an innovative regional disaster insurance scheme for Caribbean states, to give governments immediate access to funds after hurricanes and earthquakes.

In July 2013, the World Bank's President, Jim Yong Kim, announced that, as part of a larger management reshuffle, Anstey would leave the Bank's employment following the Annual Meetings in the Fall of the year.

== Biography ==
Anstey was born in London, England on 7 November 1955. She is the daughter of Edgar Anstey, a pioneer of British documentary film and Hollywood Oscar winner, and Daphne Lilly, a Film Editor at the National Film Board of Canada. Anstey was Head Girl at Henrietta Barnett School, London and went on to receive a First Class Honours Degree in International History and Politics from Leeds University; a scholarship to pursue Graduate studies in Journalism at the University of California, Berkeley; and a PhD on British Foreign Office Efforts to Influence American Opinion, 1945–49 from the London School of Economics. She was awarded a Gwilym Gibbon Prize Research Fellowship from Nuffield College, Oxford.

During the 1980s and early 1990s, Anstey authored and co-authored a number of works (see Publications). She worked as Political Assistant to James Callaghan, British Prime Minister between 1974 and 1979, and as Editor of the BBC's Flagship weekly current affairs program, Analysis. While Editor of Analysis, Anstey collaborated with Peter Hennessy, a regular presenter of Analysis on BBC Radio 4 from 1987 to 1992, on a series of Analysis Papers based on interviews aired on the program (see Publications). She also served as Secretariat member of the InterAction Council, a group of former Heads of Government, chaired by Helmut Schmidt, that develops recommendations on political, economic, and social issues.

Anstey joined the World Bank in 1995 as a consultant in the Bank's External Affairs department, and the following year was appointed as assistant and speechwriter to the then World Bank President James Wolfensohn, later crediting him with giving the institution a “heart and soul”. Anstey also worked as director of media and World Bank chief spokesperson, prior to moving to the position of country director for the Caribbean, then chief of staff to the president, and then vice president for external affairs where she drove a triple agenda of results, accountability and openness. Anstey's appointment as managing director came after the departure of former Managing Director, Ngozi Okonjo-Iweala, to take up a position as co-ordinating minister for the economy and minister of finance in Nigeria.

As managing director, Anstey had a broad portfolio with responsibility for World Bank operational services, policy and systems – an arrangement which also included the Bank's External Affairs division, human resources and the Bank's information management group, as well as responsibility for gender issues. After taking over the role, Anstey said the Bank's push for modernization, openness and accountability meant people could "hold our feet to the fire”. She also advocated for innovative ways to ensure knowledge reaches citizens, not just experts. She stressed that new technologies today have the potential to democratize development and keep a check on corruption.

Caroline Anstey is married to Milton W. Hudson, former managing director and head of the economic analysis department at JPMorgan. They have two sons.

== Publications ==
- (05 Jul 1984) "The Projection of British Socialism: Foreign Office Publicity and American Opinion, 1945–50" in The Journal of Contemporary History
- (20 Nov 1986) "Foreign Office Publicity, American Aid and European Unity: Mobilizing Public Opinion" in Power in Europe? Great Britain, France, Italy and Germany in a Post-War World
- (01 Jan 1988) "La Fin du Consensus Anglais" (with Rt. Hon James Callaghan MP) in L'Evenement Europeen, Initiatives et Debats, Vol. 1
- (12 May 1988) "Birth of the British Bomb" (with Peter Hennessy) in The Independent
- (05 Jan 1990) Moneybags and Brains: The Anglo-American Special Relationship since 1945 (with Peter Hennessy), published as part of the University of Strathclyde Analysis Papers
- (05 Mar 1990) Diminished Responsibility: The Essence of Cabinet Government (with Peter Hennessy), in published as part of the University of Strathclyde Analysis Papers
- (5 May 1991) From Clogs to Clogs: Britain's Relative Economic Decline since 1851 (with Peter Hennessy), published as part of the University of Strathclyde Analysis Papers
- (05 Jul 1992) Sticks and Stones: Politics, Politicians and the English Language (with Peter Hennessy), published as part of the University of Strathclyde Analysis Papers
- (1992) Jewel in the Constitution?: the Queen, Parliament and the Royal Prerogative (with Peter Hennessy), published by University of Strathclyde
- (21 Nov 1993) "Die Risiken eines Abdriftens der Politik des Westens" (with Milton W. Hudson) in Denken und Handeln in Globaler Verantwortung - Helmut Schmidt zum Funfundsiebzigsten
- (2010) The Millennium Development Goals and the Road to 2015: Building on Progress and Responding to Crisis (with Justin Lin and contributions from World Bank Staff), published by World Bank Publications
