= Olive Anstey =

Australian nurse (1920–1983)

Olive Anstey CBE
- Born: Olive Eva Anstey; 9 August 1920; Fremantle, Western Australia
- Died: 19 August 1983 (aged 63); Shoalwater, Perth, Australia
- Burial place: Karrakatta cemetery
- Education: Royal Perth Hospital; diploma in nursing administration at the College of Nursing, Melbourne
- Occupation: Hospital matron
- Years active: 1944–1981

Olive Eva Anstey CBE (9 August 1920 – 18 August 1983) was an Australian hospital matron.

== Life ==
Born at Fremantle to sawmill benchman Terence Edwin Anstey and Eva Annie, née Donovan, Olive and her family moved to Sydney when she was eighteen months old. She moved back to Western Australia in 1934, learning shorthand and typing at Perth Technical College before starting work at a box factory in 1935 at the age of 15 (continuing her studies at night). She began training to be a nurse at the Royal Perth Hospital in 1941, despite the disapproval of her family who viewed nursing as "servitude". Passing her final examinations in 1944, she won election to the local council of the Australasian Trained Nurses Association. She campaigned in 1946 for better pay and conditions before returning to Sydney to study midwifery, running a small private hospital from 1947. She was honorary founding secretary of the New South Wales College of Nursing in 1949 before moving to South Australia as a community health nurse.

Anstey returned to Perth in 1953 to work at the Perth Chest Clinic, and was appointed matron of the new Perth Chest Hospital in May 1958 after studying nursing administration at the College of Nursing, Australia, in Melbourne. The hospital was renamed the Sir Charles Gairdner Hospital and Anstey extended its responsibilities into community health. In 1958 she was elected councillor of the Royal Australian Nursing Federation (RANF)'s Western Australian branch, of which she would serve as president from 1962 to 1966. She was on the council of the College of Nursing, Australia, from 1964 to 1971 and federal president of the RANF from 1971 to 1975. From 1977 to 1981 she was president of the International Council of Nurses.

"Throughout her career Olive was a staunch advocate for better working conditions and pay for nurses, working on various committees with the goal of obtaining recognition of nursing as a profession."

Anstey retired in 1981. She had been appointed MBE in 1969 and was elevated to CBE in 1982. On the night of 18–19 August 1983 she died suddenly at Shoalwater and was buried in Karrakatta cemetery. She is commemorated by an accommodation block for student nurses at Sir Charles Gairdner Hospital (1974) and the Olive Anstey Nursing Fund, established shortly after her death.
