= Horace Henshall =

English footballer and manager

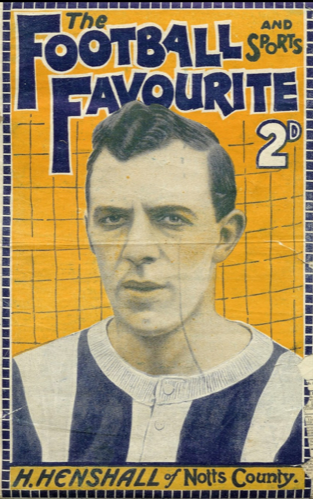

Personal information
- Full name: Horace Vincent Henshall
- Date of birth: 14 June 1889
- Place of birth: Hednesford, England
- Date of death: 7 December 1951 (aged 62)
- Height: 5 ft 9 1/2 in (1.77 m)
- Position: Outside left

Youth career
- Bridgetown Amateurs
- Crewe Alexandra

Senior career*
Years	Team	Apps	(Gls)
1910–1912	Aston Villa	45	(8)
1912–1922	Notts County	164	(27)
1922–1923	Sheffield Wednesday	14	(1)
1923–1924	Chesterfield	33	(3)
Total		256	(39)

Managerial career
- 1924–1927: Lincoln City
- 1927–1934: Notts County
- * Club domestic league appearances and goals

Horace Vincent Henshall (14 June 1889 – 7 December 1951) was an English football outside left who went on to make his name as a manager.

== Playing career ==
Henshall appeared in non-league football for Bridgetown Amateurs and Crewe Alexandra before joining the Football League with Aston Villa in 1910.

Henshall subsequently played the bulk of his football with Notts County whom he joined for a then club record fee in 1912. He made 164 league appearances for the club, although his career was inevitably interrupted by the First World War.

Henshall signed for Sheffield Wednesday in December 1922 and remained at the club until the following March, making 14 league appearances with three in the FA Cup. He finished his league career at Chesterfield where he was one of a number of veterans favoured by manager Harry Parkes at the time.

== Management career ==
Henshall was manager of Lincoln City from May 1924 to June 1927, guiding the club through a period of financial austerity. He returned to Notts County in June 1927, succeeding Albert Fisher as Secretary Manager, and remained with the club until May 1934.

After leaving Notts Henshall remained in Nottingham, serving as landlord of the Navigation Inn near the club's Meadow Lane ground.
