= Anstey case =

12th century legal dispute in England

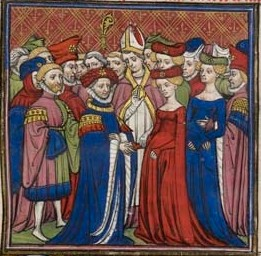
Painting of a Marriage in 1369

The Anstey case (1158–1163) was a notable legal dispute occurring in the 12th century between Richard of Anstey and Mabel de Francheville. The case was recorded in the letters of John of Salisbury, Richard of Anstey's own diary and financial documents from the suit. The case itself was a land dispute as Richard sought to have the lands of his uncle, William de Sackville, bequeathed to himself rather than Sackville's daughter, Mabel de Francheville. The case has received interest for its movement between secular and ecclesiastical courts, the length of the proceedings and the notable figures, such as John of Salisbury expressing opinions on the court proceedings.

== The case ==
Following the death of William de Sackville, Richard launched a legal case against Mabel for the recovery of the lands of William de Sackville. Richard 'claimed to be the heir of his uncle, William de Sackville, on the grounds that William's only child, Mabel de Francheville, was illegitimate.' William de Sackville had married Albereda de Tresgoz, with both parties consenting to the marriage, before he married Mabel's mother Adelicia (the daughter of Amfrid – the sheriff). However, Mabel did contest Richards claim asserting in a secular court that 'a daughter's claim to her father's inheritance must be preferred to that of a nephew.' Eventually Mabel, as the product of her father's second marriage to Adelicia, was declared illegitimate by a ruling in the name of Pope Alexander III.

However, before the verdict, Mabel contested Richard's claim to the land. She asserted in a secular court that 'a daughter's claim to her father's inheritance must be preferred to that of a nephew.' As the question of William's marriage to both Albereda and Adelicia became the fundamental crux of the case the legal proceedings were moved to an ecclesiastical court as '[j]urisdiction over marriage was exercised by the church courts'.

John of Salisbury wrote that Richard declared 'when William went through a form of marriage with Adelicia, Albereda his previous wife protested her claim to be his lawful wife at the marriage ceremony, forbidding her supplanter by the authority of the Church to pass into the illicit embraces of her husband. Since she failed to make herself heard by reason of the crowd and the forwardness of her husband, she approached the bishop of Winchester, then legate of the Apostolic See, and as he testified by his letters, at length obtained his decree that her husband should leave his second partner and be restored to her.' The Bishop of Winchester at the time was Henry of Winchester, who held the post between 1134–41, as papal legate held a synod to confirm this judgement.

The sacrament of marriage was considered by John of Salisbury to have been fulfilled by William's marriage to Albereda as due to the fact that their marriage 'was done by lawful consent, she was a wife from the moment when by her promise freely given she consented to be his wife.' However, Mabel contested this judgement as her father had married her mother 'with all the solemn rites of the Church' and 'had returned Albereda's dowry.'

The final court day was fixed by Richard for the fourth Sunday of Lent on the grounds that his legal victory was being postponed 'by the shiftiness of a woman.' At the proceeding Pope Alexander III pronounced Richard to be the legal heir to William de Sackville on account of William's first marriage rendering Mabel illegitimate. 'For Alexander III the annulment was the crucial issue, and Mabel was adjudged illegitimate.'

== Lasting influence ==
The Anstey case 'is familiar to historians. It has a relatively long bibliography, extending from an 1832 edition of sources to discussions in recent monographs.' The case has significance when investigating the sacrament of marriage in the twelfth century. The judgements and opinions given on the case were made by notable religious figures, Pope Alexander III and the chronicler John of Salisbury, continue to garner interest and secure the case's preservation in history.
