= Edgar Anstey (psychologist) =

British psychologist

- Born: 5 May 1917; Mumbai, India
- Died: 1 June 2009 (aged 92); Polzeath, Cornwall
- Occupation: Civil Service psychologist
- Known for: role during the Cuban Missile Crisis of 1962

Dr. Edgar Anstey (5 March 1917 – 1 June 2009) was a British Civil Service psychologist who worked for the Ministry of Defence and who is most noted for his incidental role during the Cuban Missile Crisis of 1962.

== Early life ==
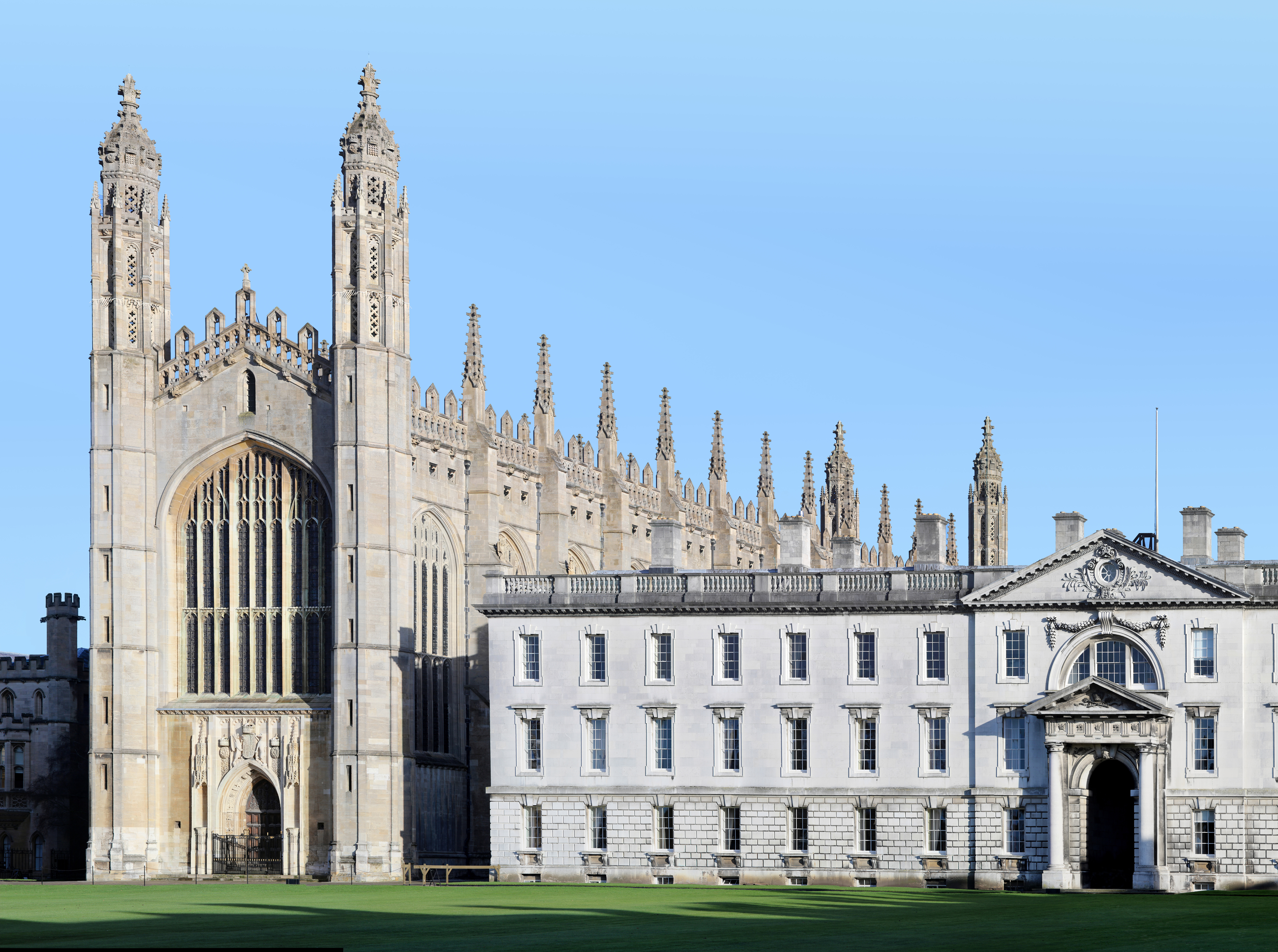
Anstey took a First Class degree at King's College, Cambridge in 1938

Edgar Anstey was born in Mumbai in India in 1917 where his father Percy Anstey (1876–1920), a former actor turned economist, was Principal of the Sydenham College of Commerce and Economics and Professor of Economic Theory and History. His mother was Vera Anstey née Powell (1889–1976), also an economist and authority on the economy of India. In 1920 Anstey's father and younger brother died in Delhi of cholera necessitating Vera Anstey to return to Britain with her two surviving children.

Left with few resources after the death of her husband, Vera Anstey needed to find work to support herself and her children and began a distinguished career as a lecturer at the London School of Economics, while Edgar was brought up by two of his mother's sisters in Reigate in Surrey. Academically able, he obtained a scholarship to Winchester College and later another to King's College, Cambridge where he obtained a double first degree in Mathematics and Psychology in 1938. On graduating he spent a year as a ministerial Private Secretary in the Civil Service before being called up in 1939 at the start of World War II. Commissioned as a second lieutenant in the Dorset Regiment he had 18 months of active service in defending the Yorkshire coast from possible enemy invasion and was promoted to Major. He married Zoë Lilian Robertson (1913–2000) in 1939 and with her had a son, David Anstey. From 1941 to 1945 Anstey was at the War Office where his skills as a psychologist were put to use improving the selection tests used for army recruits.

== Civil service ==
In 1945 at the end of the War Anstey founded the research unit for the Civil Service Commission with responsibility for finding alternatives to the traditional written exams candidates were required to sit. After working at the Home Office from 1951 to 1958 and then for the Ministry of Defence he was appointed Chief Psychologist at the Civil Service Commission. As senior principal psychologist in the Ministry of Defence, in October 1962 Anstey travelled to Washington during the Cuban Missile Crisis where he made use of his psychological expertise to assess the likely impact of nuclear warfare on the population. Anstey made warnings to Lord Mountbatten, Chief of the Defence Staff, Sir Solly Zuckerman, Chief Scientific Adviser, the members of the Joint Inter-Services Group for the Study of All-Out Warfare (JIGSAW) and the US Joint Chiefs of Staff concerning the dangers of escalating an already tense situation, and emphasising the importance of negotiation and conciliation, rather than a pre-emptive strike. Eventually this was the response followed by President John F. Kennedy.

Anstey was Director of the Behavioural Sciences Research Division (BSRD) of the Civil Service Department from 1969 to 1977. When the Civil Service Commission merged with the personnel management division of HM Treasury to create the Civil Service Department in 1969 Anstey was the Deputy Chief Scientific Officer and Head of Research until his retirement in 1977. During the 1960s and 1970s he wrote a number of books which explained serious occupational psychological matters with a light and humorous touch. His publications included: Interviewing for the Selection of Staff (with Dr. E. O. Mercer, 1956); Staff Reporting and Staff Development (1961); Committees, How They Work and How to Work Them (1962), all published by Allen & Unwin, and Psychological Tests (Thomas Nelson, 1966). During this period he completed a PhD at University College London, under the supervision of Sir Cyril Burt.

== Later years ==
Strong-willed and an independent thinker, he often came into conflict with those in positions above him which perhaps explains why he did not receive an honour at the end of his 36-year career in the Civil Service in 1977. An enthusiastic surfer and walker, on his retirement Anstey and his wife moved to Polzeath in Cornwall where they had regularly spent family holidays since the 1950s. He got involved in local politics on behalf of the Liberal Party, becoming a constituency officer and then President of the local party from 1985 to 1990.

His wife predeceased him in 2000. Edgar Anstey died at Polzeath in 2009 aged 92 and was survived by his son, David Anstey, and four grandchildren.
