= Brendel Anstey =

English footballer (1887–1933)

Personal information
- Date of birth: November 1887
- Place of birth: Bristol, England
- Date of death: 9 December 1933 (aged 46)
- Place of death: Wednesbury, England
- Position: Goalkeeper

Senior career*
| Years | Team | Apps | (Gls) |
- Hanham Athletic
| 1911 | Bristol Rovers | | |
| 1911–1914 | Aston Villa | 42 | (0) |
| 1919 | Leicester City | 7 | (0) |
- Mid Rhondda
- Wednesbury Old Athletic
- * Club domestic league appearances and goals

Brendel Anstey (November 1887 – 9 December 1933) was a footballer who played in the Football League for Aston Villa and Leicester City.

Born in Bristol, England, Anstey was a goalkeeper, who played for Bristol Rovers before signing for Aston Villa in February 1911 in a swap deal with James Jones, playing for them for four seasons until the outbreak of World War I.

He went on to play for Leicester City after the war.

He died on 9 December 1933 in Wednesbury, aged 46.
