= Vera Anstey =

British economist (1889–1976)

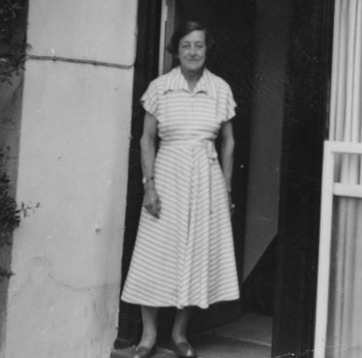
- Anstey, c. 1950
- Born: 3 January 1889; Reigate, Surrey, England
- Died: 26 November 1976 (aged 87); Tolworth Hospital, Surbiton, Surrey, England
- Spouse: Percy Anstey

Academic background
- Education: London School of Economics
- Influences: John Maynard Keynes

Academic work
- Discipline: Economy of India
- Institutions: London School of Economics; University of London; Sydenham College of Commerce and Economics

Vera Anstey (née Powell; 3 January 1889 – 26 November 1976) was a British economist and noted expert on the economy of India. Anstey is most closely associated with the London School of Economics, where she served as a lecturer and chaired the admissions committee, and with the wider University of London, where she served as dean of the faculty of economics.

== Early life ==
Anstey was born in Reigate, Surrey on 3 January 1889. Her father was leather merchant James Powell and her mother was Mary Sophia Powell (née Higginbotham). The family consisted of her parents, three daughters and three sons, with Vera being the second of the three daughters.

She was schooled at Cheltenham Ladies' College and spent a year at the Hoch Conservatory in Frankfurt, Germany studying German and music (piano and violin). Her education continued at Bedford School for Women where she studied for a diploma in public health. Anstey would then attend the London School of Economics to study for a degree in economic history in 1909, graduating in 1913 with first class honours.

== Academic career ==
Anstey married Percy Louis Anstey in 1913. Percy was a former actor who had then studied economics at the London School of Economics, before serving as the head of the economics department at the University of Bristol. He took the role of principal at the Sydenham College of Commerce and Economics, Bombay (now Mumbai) in 1914 and Vera accompanied him to India.

Her role in India involved examining students studying for a BCom degree at Sydenham College, in addition to her formal role, she developed a strong interest in the Indian economy and began to collect significant quantities of economic data concerning the Indian economy.

Her husband and Arthur, their youngest child, died from cholera during November 1920. This resulted in Vera returning to the United Kingdom with their two surviving children, Mary Anstey (1916– 1989) and the psychologist Edgar Anstey (1917–2009). Anstey, by now in need of a job to support herself and her two children, would take a role as an assistant lecturer in economic history at the London School of Economics in 1921. She was promoted and became a lecturer in commerce during 1929, received a DSc (Econ) degree in 1930 and was appointed the Sir Ernest Cassel reader in commerce in 1941.

Anstey's teaching at the London School of Economics involved significant coverage of the economy of India, including responsibility for teaching courses on Indian trade and Indian production, initially to undergraduate students, and eventually to graduate students. She also established a seminar on Indian economic development which was well received and which she ran until 1965, and would write several texts concerning the Indian economy, which gained widespread recognition.

Her work at the university also took in several administrative roles; she served as senior tutor and chair of the undergraduate admissions committee from 1939 to 1959, and aided in the university's relocation from London to Cambridge during World War II. Anstey would go on to serve as dean of the school of economics for the wider University of London (of which the London School of Economics is a constituent college) during 1950 to 1954.

The Government approached Anstey in 1950 to take a position on the Royal Commission on the Taxation of Profits and Income, examining potential changes to taxation policy in the UK. Anstey served on the commission from appointment in 1951 to completion of the work in 1955.

Anstey retired from a full-time position at the London School of Economics in 1954, remaining a part-time member of staff until finally retiring in 1964.

In 2017, she featured in a conference, London's Women Historians, held at the Institute of Historical Research.
