= Anstey, Hertfordshire =

Village in Hertfordshire, England

Coordinates: 51°58′35″N 00°02′37″E

Anstey
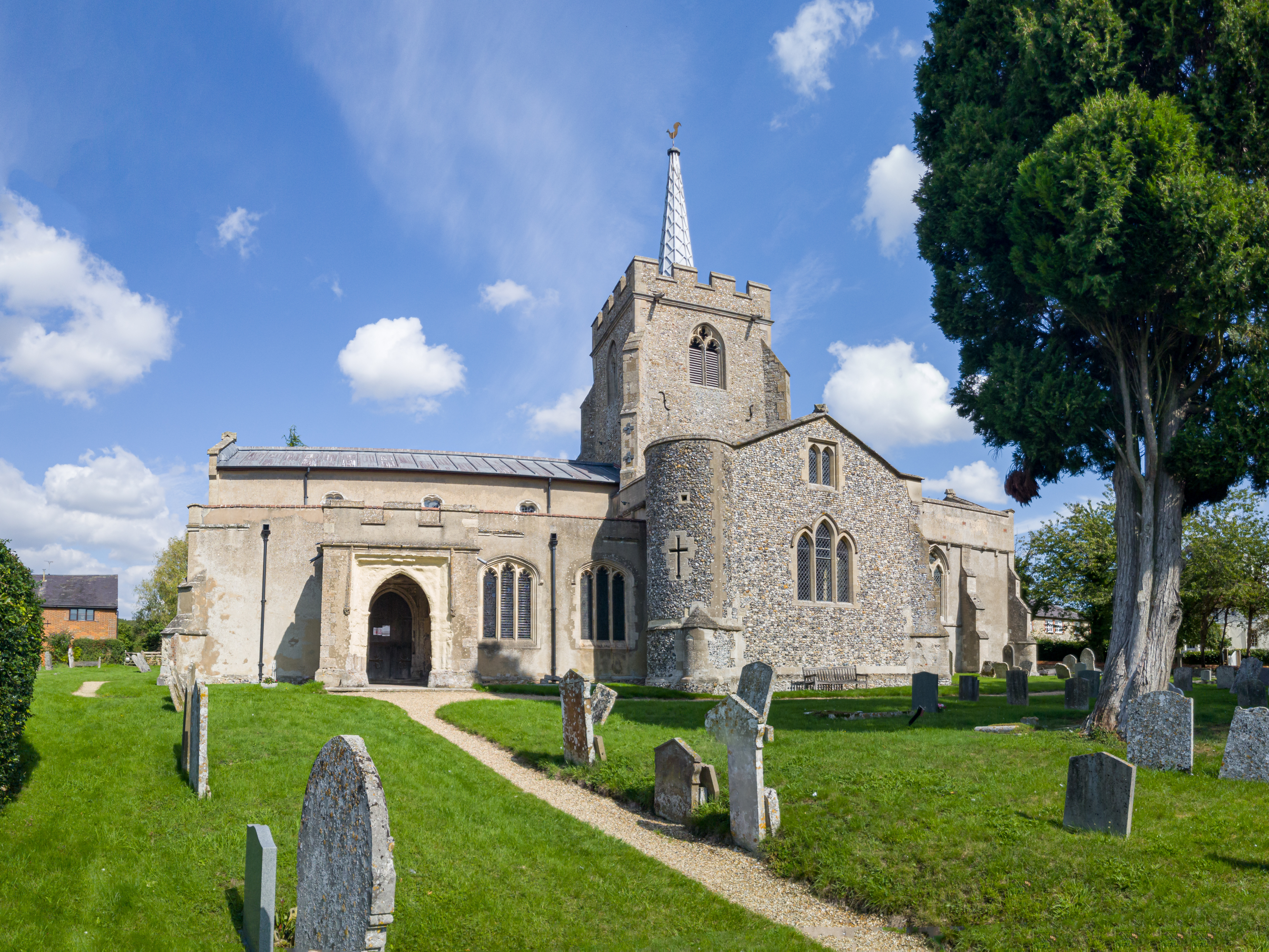
- St George's Church, Anstey

- Location within Hertfordshire
- Population: 306 (Parish, 2021)
- OS grid reference: TL404328
- Civil parish: Anstey
- District: East Hertfordshire
- Shire county: Hertfordshire
- Region: East
- Country: England
- Sovereign state: United Kingdom
- Post town: Buntingford
- Postcode district: SG9
- Police: Hertfordshire
- Fire: Hertfordshire
- Ambulance: East of England
- UK Parliament: North East Hertfordshire

Anstey is a village and civil parish in the East Hertfordshire district of Hertfordshire, England. It lies 3 miles (5 km) north-east of Buntingford, its post town. At the 2021 census the parish had a population of 306.

The name "Anstey" derives from the Old English ān (narrow, or one-way) and stīg (footpath).

There are at least two books on the history of this village. The first is Anstey, a Hertfordshire Parish, written in 1929 by Rev Frank Ricardo Williams, MA, who was the rector from 1907 to 1928 (died 19 May 1937). The second is Anstey: Our True Surname Origin and Shared Medieval Ancestry by GM Anstey and TJ Anstey in which it is shown that all bearers of the surname 'Anstey' worldwide can trace their surname origin to Anstey in Hertfordshire.

The Church of England parish church of Saint George is a cruciform building of flint with stone dressings. Its earliest parts are the chancel, transepts and crossing tower, all of which were built in the 12th century. The church was altered in the 13th century and the nave was rebuilt in the 14th century. The south porch and the top stage of the tower are 15th century. The church was restored in 1871–72 under the direction of the Gothic Revival architect William Butterfield. Repairs in 1907 were directed by the architect Arthur Blomfield. St George's is a Grade I listed building. The lychgate is a separate Grade II listed building, as it incorporates a lockup which was apparently used until the beginning of the 20th century.

In his book 'England's Thousand best churches' (revised edition 2002), Simon Jenkins refers to a near-miss when a fully loaded WW2 bomber nearly crashed into the church. This is reference to the crash of a Flying Fortress which crashed on take-off en route to Cologne: all ten crew were killed. Jenkins refers to the church as 'full of Norman mystery'. He pays particular interest to the church font, in which (and very unusually) four mermen are carved into the stone. Jenkins refers to the carvings as '...the rarest of pagan emblems'.

A folk tale tells of a fiddler from Anstey named Blind George, who disappeared while exploring an underground passage. He is said to have entered the tunnel playing his fiddle, which could be heard above ground. He stopped suddenly, and screams were heard, and he was not seen again.

The village has a pub, The Blind Fiddler, which used to be called The Chequers.

== See also ==
- Anstey Castle
- The Hundred Parishes
