= Grace Oakeshott =

Woman rights activist

Grace before she faked her death

Grace Oakeshott (born Grace Cash, later Joan Reeve; 1872–1929) was a British activist for women's rights who faked her own death in 1907 and emigrated to New Zealand with her lover, Walter Reeve.

== Biography ==
Grace Cash was born in 1872. She married Harold Oakeshott, and both were active in socialist circles. Grace wrote a paper in 1900 on Women in the Cigar Trade in London, published in The Economic Journal. She was involved in the foundation of the first Trade School for Girls in 1904, and in the Women's Industrial Council.

In 1907, a pile of her clothes was found on a beach in Brittany where she was on holiday, giving the impression that she had drowned. In fact, she had made plans to emigrate to New Zealand with her lover Walter Reeve, apparently with the knowledge of her husband, at a time when divorce was difficult and scandalous. The supposed widower, Harold Oakeshott, later married again, bigamously.

In New Zealand, Oakeshott used the name Joan Reeve and had three children with Walter Reeve. She died of multiple sclerosis in 1929 in New Zealand.

== Legacy ==
Oakeshott was the subject of the play Grace, written and directed by her great-granddaughter Sophie Dingemans, which was performed at Wellington's BATS Theatre in 2008.

Her life has been extensively researched by British author Jocelyn Robson, who published Radical Reformers and Respectable Rebels: How the Two Lives of Grace Oakeshott Defined an Era (2016, Palgrave Macmillan ISBN 9781137311832).

In December 2025, the podcast "Cautionary Tales" included an episode on Oakeshott, titled "The Disappearance of Grace Oakeshott".
