= Brahhingas =

The Brahhingas or Brahingas were a tribe or clan of Anglo-Saxon England whose territory was centred on the settlement of Braughing in modern-day Hertfordshire. The name of the tribe means "the people of Brahha", with Brahha likely to have been either a leader of the tribe or a real or mythical ancestor.

The tribe are first recorded in a charter dating from the 830s or 840s, and their regio or administrative territory is likely to have included the later parishes of Reed, Barkway, Barley, Nuthampstead, Buckland, Wyddial, Anstey, Throcking, Aspenden, Layston, Great Hormead, Little Hormead, Westmill and Standon, in the valleys of the River Rib and River Quin. The Brahhingas were originally within the area of the Middle Saxons but fell under the control of the East Saxons at an early date. The area remained part of the Archdeaconry of Middlesex even after it became part of Hertfordshire.

The territory of the Brahhingas exhibits a high degree of continuity with pre-Saxon eras. Immediately to the south of the tribe's royal vill in Braughing lay the site of the second largest Roman town in modern Hertfordshire, and next to that lay an Iron Age oppidum. The location of the Roman town is called Wickham Hill, a form of name including the Latin word vicus and the Old English suffix -ham, which often indicates continuity between Roman and Anglo-Saxon settlement. These suggest that the territory of the Brahhingas may have developed gradually from an earlier pagus of the Catuvellauni during the Romano-British period.

Alongside the Waeclingas and the Hicce, the Brahhingas were one of the most important tribes of the Anglo Saxon era within the area that would later become Hertfordshire, and the central places and territories of these areas were to be important building-blocks of the later administrative structure of the county.

== Bibliography ==
- Bailey, Keith (1989), "The Middle Saxons", in Bassett, Steven (ed.), The Origins of Anglo-Saxon Kingdoms, Leicester: Leicester University Press, pp. 108–122, ISBN 0718513177
- Rowe, Anne; Williamson, Tom (2013), Hertfordshire: A Landscape History, Hatfield: University of Hertfordshire Press, ISBN 1909291021
- Williamson, Tom (2000), The Origins of Hertfordshire, Manchester: Manchester University Press, ISBN 071904491X
- Williamson, Tom (2013), Environment, Society and Landscape in Early Medieval England: Time and Topography, Woodbridge: Boydell Press, ISBN 1843837374
