= Edwinstree =

Historical division of Hertfordshire, England

Edwinstree was a judicial and taxation subdivision (a "hundred") of Hertfordshire, in the east of the county, that existed from the 10th to the 19th century.

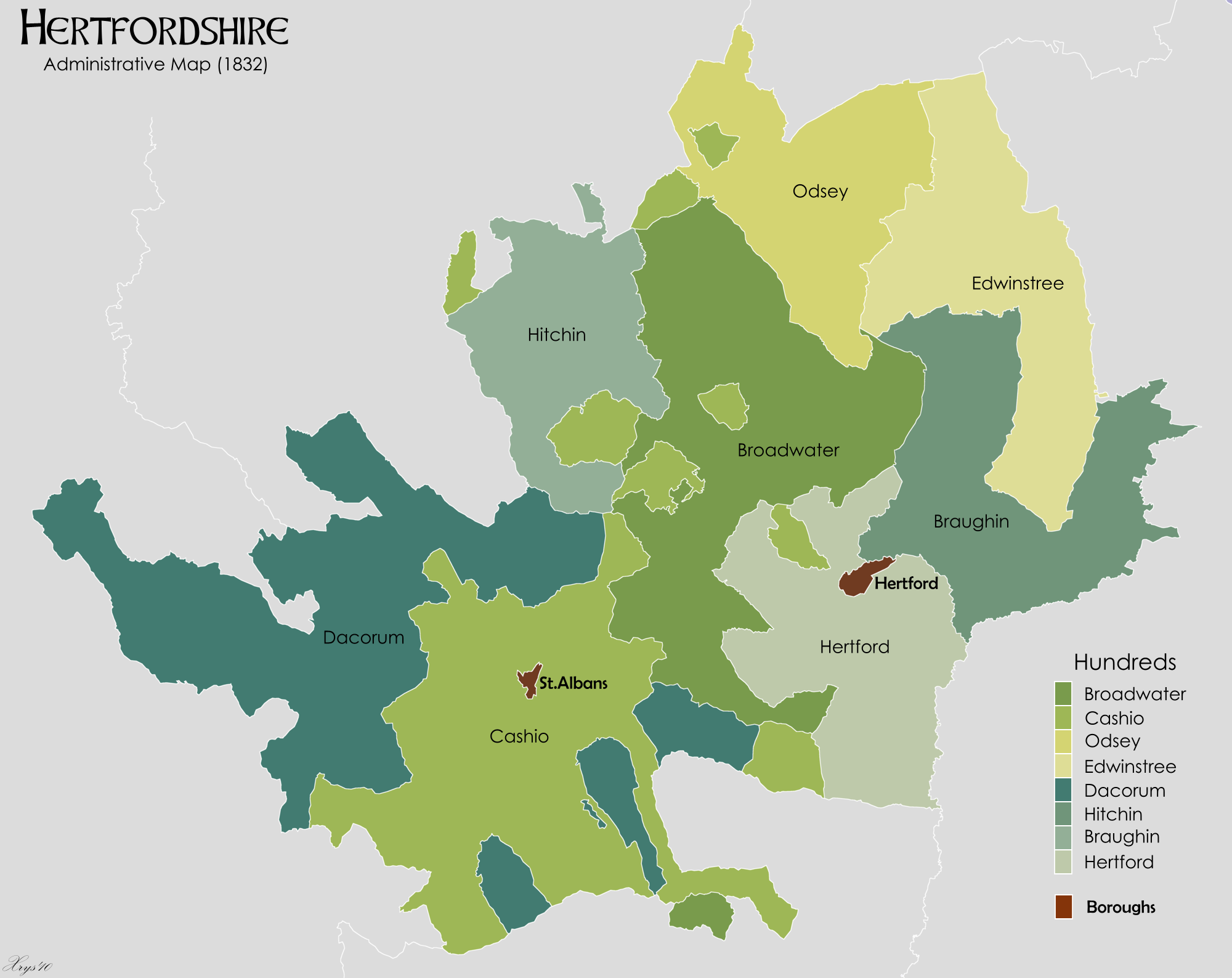
Hertfordshire hundreds in 1832

It comprised the following parishes: Albury, Anstey, Aspeden, Barkway, Barley, Brent Pelham, Buckland, Buntingford, Furneaux Pelham, Great Hormead, Layston, Little Hadham, Little Hormead, Meesden, Much Hadham, Stocking Pelham, Throcking, Wakeley and Wyddiall. At the time of the Domesday Book, Widford was part of Edwinstree hundred but it was transferred to Braughing hundred by the 1300s.

The hundred meeting point was at an open-air site called Meeting Field in Furneaux Pelham. The name suggests it was near a tree called "Edwin's Tree". An alternative name of Eddiford appears in a 14th-century record and may refer to an adjacent crossing of the River Ash.

The hundred was owned by the King and farmed, together with neighbouring Odsey, by the Sheriff of Hertfordshire. In 1613 it was granted to "William Whitmore and others" in trust for Sir Julius Adelmare.

The area was settled by the Saxon tribe called the Brahingas and became part of the area of the Middle Saxons within the Kingdom of Essex. When Christianity was introduced into Essex in 604, Edwinstree and Braughing hundreds became part of the Archdeaconry of Middlesex within the Diocese of East Saxons.

Haslam proposes that the hundred was originally part of a larger "proto-hundred" which comprised the five East Hertfordshire hundreds of Braughing, Edwinstree, Odsey, Broadwater and Hertford; this territory was originally created to support the two Burhs at Hertford, on opposite banks of the River Lea, built by King Edward the Elder in 913 to defend against the Danes. The interlocking nature of Braughing and Edwinstree hundreds is taken as evidence that they were originally part of a single unit that was later subdivided into hundreds.
