= Braughing Rural District =

History of Hertfordshire

Coordinates: 51.946°N 0.017°W

- Rural district
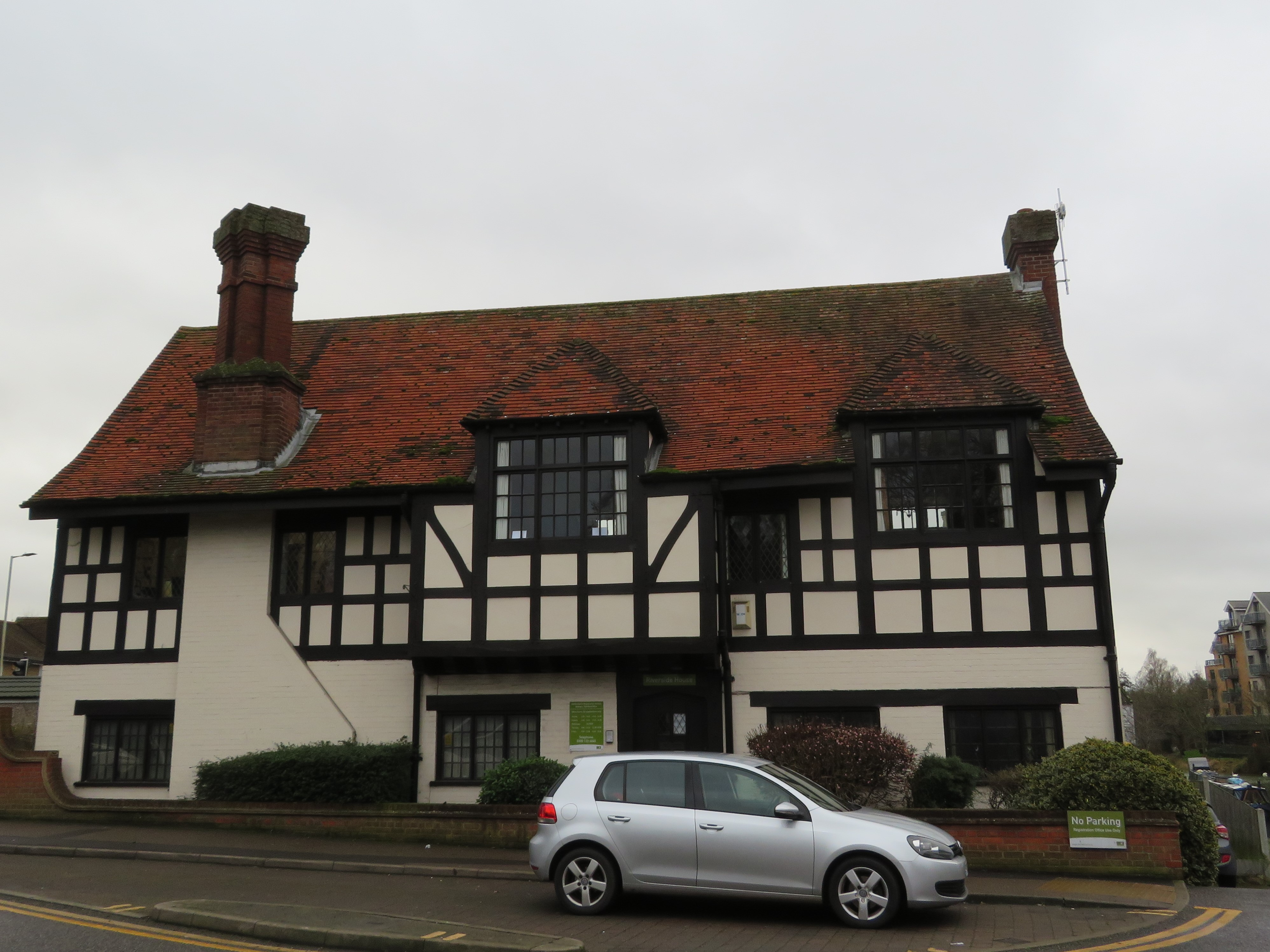
- Council offices: 2 Hockerill Street, Bishop's Stortford
- Population
  - 1939: 11,137
  - 1971: 12,200
- History
  - Created: 1 April 1935
  - Abolished: 31 March 1974
  - Succeeded by: East Hertfordshire
  - HQ: Buntingford and Bishop's Stortford
- Contained within
  - County Council: Hertfordshire

Braughing was a rural district in Hertfordshire, England from 1935 to 1974.

== Creation ==
Braughing Rural District was created on 1 April 1935 under a County Review Order by the merger of most of the Hadham Rural District and most of the Buntingford Rural District. It was named after Braughing, a village central to the district and which was also the name of a former hundred of Hertfordshire.

== Parishes ==
Braughing Rural District contained the following civil parishes.

| Parish | From | To | Notes |
|---|---|---|---|
| Albury | 1 Apr 1935 | 31 Mar 1974 | |
| Anstey | 1 Apr 1935 | 31 Mar 1974 | |
| Ardeley | 1 Apr 1935 | 31 Mar 1974 | |
| Aspenden | 1 Apr 1935 | 31 Mar 1974 | |
| Braughing | 1 Apr 1935 | 31 Mar 1974 | |
| Brent Pelham | 1 Apr 1935 | 31 Mar 1974 | |
| Broadfield | 1 Apr 1935 | 31 Mar 1955 | Parish abolished to become part of Cottered on 1 April 1955. |
| Buckland | 1 Apr 1935 | 31 Mar 1974 | |
| Buntingford | 1 Apr 1937 | 31 Mar 1974 | Parish created 1 April 1937 from former parish of Layston and parts of Aspenden, Throcking, and Wyddial parishes. |
| Cottered | 1 Apr 1935 | 31 Mar 1974 | |
| Furneux Pelham | 1 Apr 1935 | 31 Mar 1974 | |
| Great Hormead | 1 Apr 1935 | 31 Mar 1937 | Parish merged with Little Hormead to become new parish of Hormead on 1 April 1937. |
| High Wych | 1 Apr 1935 | 31 Mar 1974 | |
| Hormead | 1 Apr 1937 | 31 Mar 1974 | Parish created 1 April 1937 from former parishes of Great Hormead and Little Hormead. |
| Layston | 1 Apr 1935 | 31 Mar 1937 | Parish abolished to become part of Buntingford on 1 April 1937. |
| Little Hadham | 1 Apr 1935 | 31 Mar 1974 | |
| Little Hormead | 1 Apr 1935 | 31 Mar 1937 | Parish merged with Great Hormead to become new parish of Hormead on 1 April 1937. |
| Meesden | 1 Apr 1935 | 31 Mar 1974 | |
| Much Hadham | 1 Apr 1935 | 31 Mar 1974 | |
| Stocking Pelham | 1 Apr 1935 | 31 Mar 1974 | |
| Thorley | 1 Apr 1935 | 31 Mar 1974 | |
| Throcking | 1 Apr 1935 | 31 Mar 1955 | Parish abolished to become part of Cottered on 1 April 1955. |
| Westmill | 1 Apr 1935 | 31 Mar 1974 | |
| Wyddial | 1 Apr 1935 | 31 Mar 1974 | |

== Premises ==
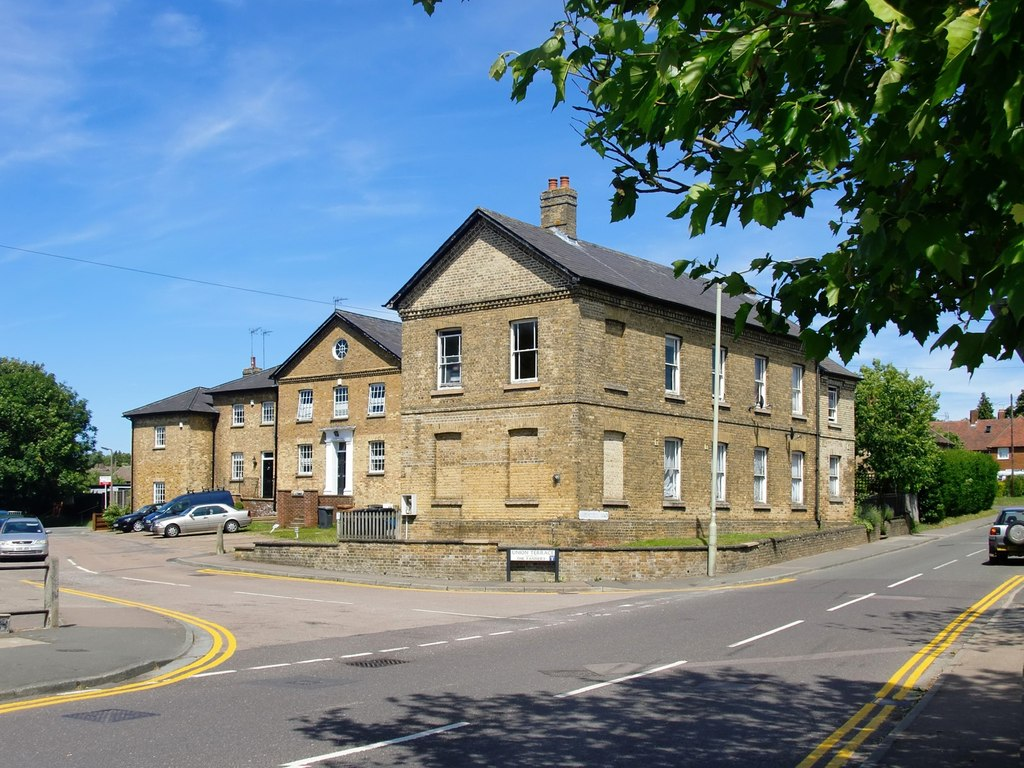
Bridgefoot House, Buntingford

The district council continued to use the offices it inherited from the two predecessor districts: Bridgefoot House in Buntingford from the Buntingford Rural District, and 2 Hockerill Street in Bishop's Stortford from the Hadham Rural District. Meetings were held alternately at each office.

== Abolition ==
Braughing Rural District was abolished under the Local Government Act 1972, becoming part of East Hertfordshire on 1 April 1974.
