= Buntingford Rural District =

History of Hertfordshire

Coordinates: 51.946°N 0.017°W

- Rural district
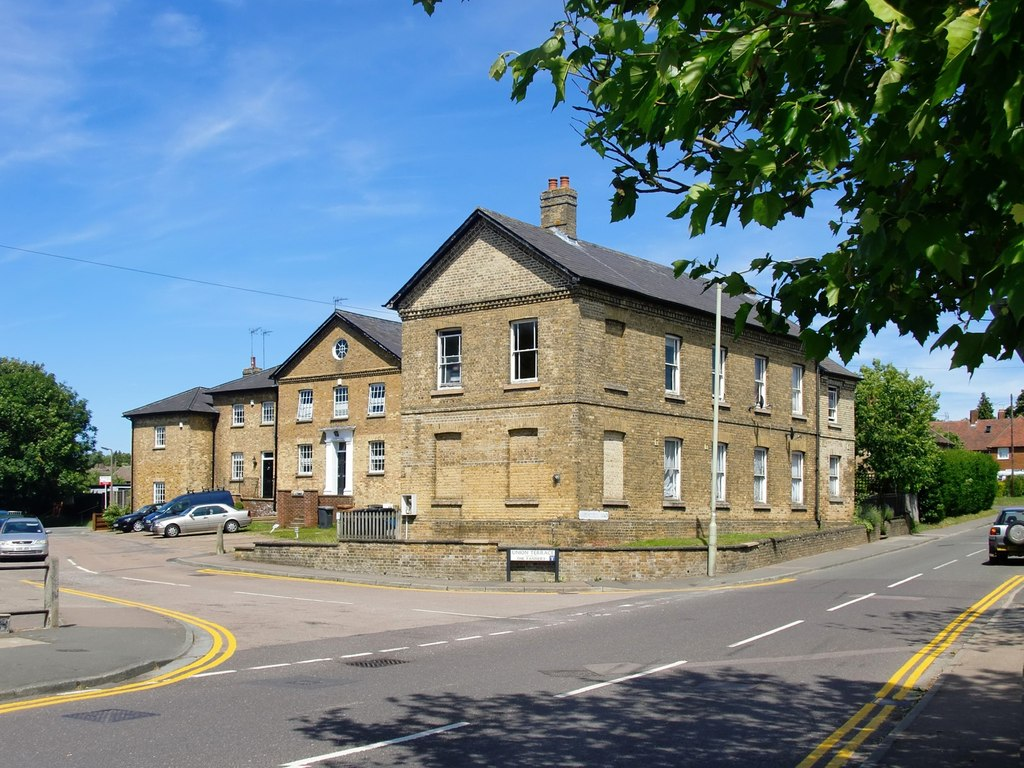
- Bridgefoot House, Union Terrace, Buntingford
- Population
  - 1901: 5,020
  - 1931: 4,638
- History
  - Created: 28 December 1894
  - Abolished: 31 March 1935
  - Succeeded by: Braughing Rural District
  - HQ: Buntingford
- Contained within
  - County Council: Hertfordshire

Buntingford Rural District was a rural district in Hertfordshire, England from 1894 to 1935, covering the town of Buntingford and a number of surrounding parishes in the north-east of the county.

== Formation ==
Buntingford Poor Law Union had been created in 1835 following the Poor Law Amendment Act 1834, centred on the small town of Buntingford. A workhouse was built in Buntingford to serve the union, opening in 1837. Under the Public Health Act 1872 sanitary districts were created, and the boards of guardians of poor law unions were made responsible for public health and local government for any part of their district not included in an urban authority. As the Buntingford Poor Law Union had no urban authorities, the Buntingford Rural Sanitary District covered the same area as the Buntingford Poor Law Union, and both were governed by the Buntingford Board of Guardians.

Under the Local Government Act 1894, rural sanitary districts became rural districts from 28 December 1894. The link with the poor law union continued, with all the elected councillors of the rural district council being ex officio members of the Buntingford Board of Guardians. The new district council held its first meeting on 3 January 1895, when the former chairman of the board of guardians, John Williamson Leader, was appointed the first chairman of the council. He held the post until his death in 1897.

== Parishes ==
Buntingford Rural District contained the following civil parishes:

- Anstey
- Ardeley
- Aspenden
- Broadfield
- Buckland
- Cottered
- Great Hormead
- Layston
- Little Hormead
- Meesden
- Rushden
- Sandon
- Throcking
- Wallington
- Westmill
- Wyddial

== Premises ==
The council met and had its offices at the Buntingford Union Workhouse, later known as Bridgefoot House.

== Abolition ==
Under the Local Government Act 1929 the boards of guardians and poor law unions were abolished, and provisions were put in place allowing county councils to review the districts within their areas to form more effective areas for administrative purposes. Hertfordshire County Council had a number of relatively sparsely populated districts in the north and east of the county. It was decided to split Buntingford Rural District, with three parishes on the north-western edge of the district ( Rushden, Sandon and Wallington) being transferred to Hitchin Rural District, whilst the remainder of the Buntingford Rural District merged with the neighbouring Hadham Rural District to create a new district called Braughing Rural District. These changes took effect on 1 April 1935.
