= Hadham Rural District =

Historical rural district

Coordinates: 51.85372°N 0.07201°E

Hadham Rural District Bishop's Stortford Rural District (1894–1895)
- Rural district
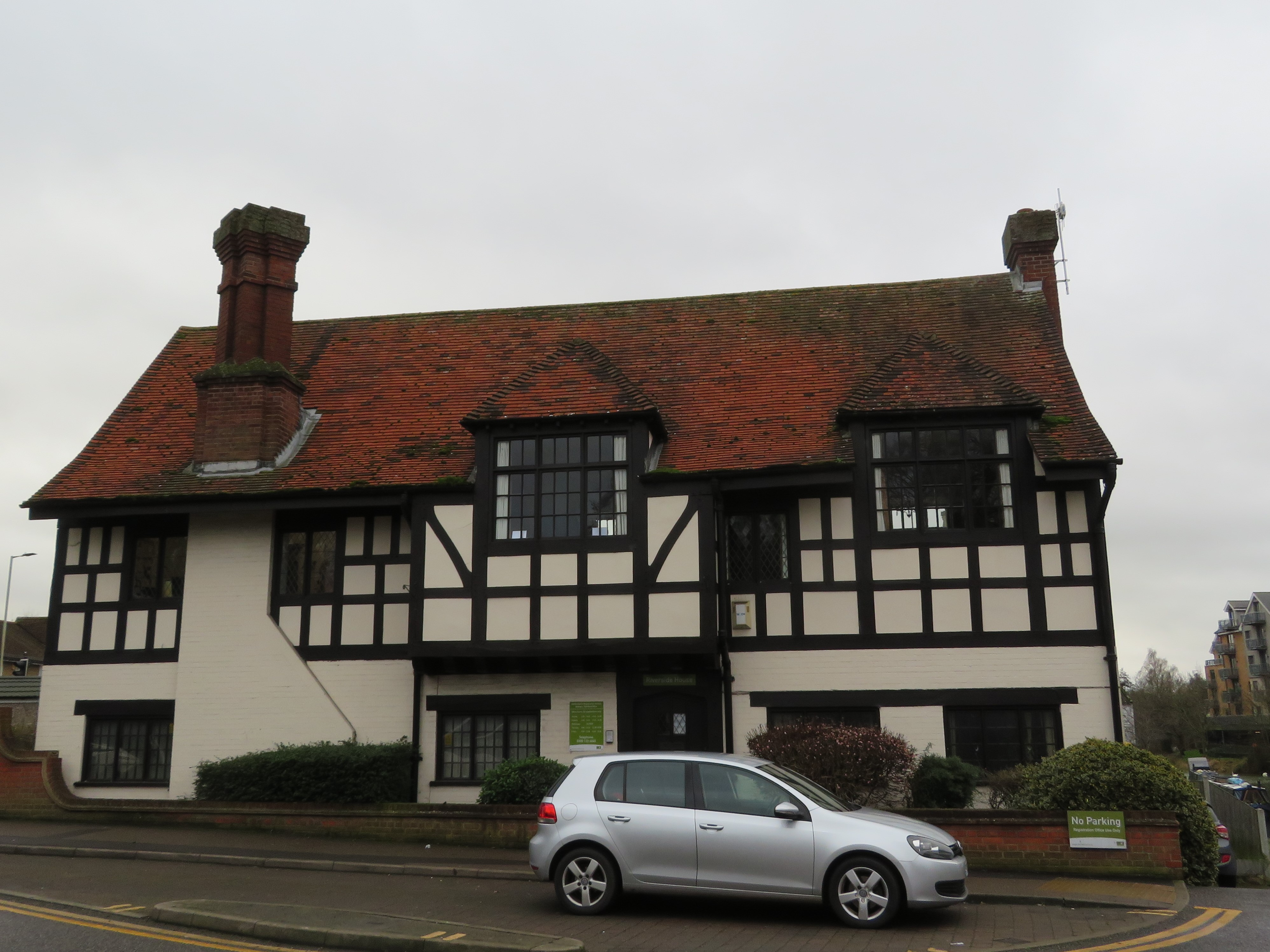
- Council offices: 2 Hockerill Street, Bishop's Stortford
- Population
  - 1911: 5,795
  - 1931: 5,471
- History
  - Created: 28 December 1894
  - Abolished: 31 March 1935
  - Succeeded by: Braughing Rural District
  - HQ: Bishop's Stortford
- Contained within
  - County Council: Hertfordshire

Hadham Rural District was a rural district in Hertfordshire, England from 1894 to 1935, covering an area in the east of the county.

== Evolution ==
The district had its origins in the Bishop's Stortford Rural Sanitary District. This had been created in 1872, giving public health and local government responsibilities for rural areas to the existing boards of guardians of poor law unions. The Bishop's Stortford Rural Sanitary District surrounded but did not include the town of Bishop's Stortford, which had a local board.

Under the Local Government Act 1894, rural sanitary districts became rural districts from 28 December 1894. Where they straddled county boundaries, as Bishop's Stortford Rural Sanitary District did, they were to be split into separate rural districts in each county, unless boundary changes could be agreed. In July 1894, a joint committee of Hertfordshire and Essex County Councils narrowly decided (on the chairman's casting vote) to transfer the ten Essex parishes of the Bishop's Stortford Rural Sanitary District into Hertfordshire. The proposal was not popular with the Essex parishes, and at a public meeting in October 1894 the councils reversed the decision, deciding instead to allow the Essex parishes to become a separate rural district called the Stansted Rural District.

The new rural district for the Hertfordshire part of the rural sanitary district was initially given the name "Bishop's Stortford Rural District". However, even before it came into being discussions began on whether to rename it after either Sawbridgeworth, its most populous parish, or Much Hadham as a central place within the district. The new council held its initial meeting on 3 January 1895 in Bishop's Stortford, where William Chamberlain Mole was elected the first chairman of the council, and it was decided that subsequent meetings would be held at Much Hadham. From the council's next meeting on 4 February 1895 it called itself the Hadham Rural District, and met at the Public Hall in Much Hadham (now known as Much Hadham Village Hall).

== Parishes ==
Hadham Rural District consisted of the following parishes:

Parish	From	To	Notes
Albury	28 Dec 1894	31 Mar 1935	
Braughing	28 Dec 1894	31 Mar 1935	
Brent Pelham	28 Dec 1894	31 Mar 1935	
Furneux Pelham	28 Dec 1894	31 Mar 1935	
High Wych	1 Apr 1901	31 Mar 1935	Parish created from that part of Sawbridgeworth excluded from Sawbridgeworth Urban District.
Little Hadham	28 Dec 1894	31 Mar 1935	
Much Hadham	28 Dec 1894	31 Mar 1935	
Sawbridgeworth	28 Dec 1894	31 Mar 1901	Sawbridgeworth parish was split in 1901 when the town became an urban district; the rural parts of the old parish became a new parish called High Wych.
Stocking Pelham	28 Dec 1894	31 Mar 1935	
Thorley	28 Dec 1894	31 Mar 1935	

== Premises ==
The Public Hall in Much Hadham did not serve as the council's meeting place for long; by 1899 the council had reverted to meeting in Bishop's Stortford. By 1902, the Hadham Rural District Council, Stansted Rural District Council and Bishop's Stortford Board of Guardians had set up joint offices at 29 North Street in Bishop's Stortford.

In 1926 the two councils and the board of guardians built a new headquarters at 2 Hockerill Street (later also called Riverside House), a neo-Tudor building beside the River Stort.

== Abolition ==
Sawbridgeworth became an urban district in 1901, removing it from the Hadham Rural District, although the western, more rural, part of the old Sawbridgeworth parish was excluded from the new urban district, becoming a separate parish called High Wych, which remained in the Hadham Rural District.

Hadham Rural District was abolished in 1935 under a County Review Order. The bulk of the district became part of the new Braughing Rural District (along with most of the Buntingford Rural District), with small parts going to Bishop's Stortford Urban District and to the Ware Rural District. Since 1974 the area has formed part of East Hertfordshire.
