= St Mary's Church, Little Hormead =

Coordinates: 51.9429°N 0.0332°E

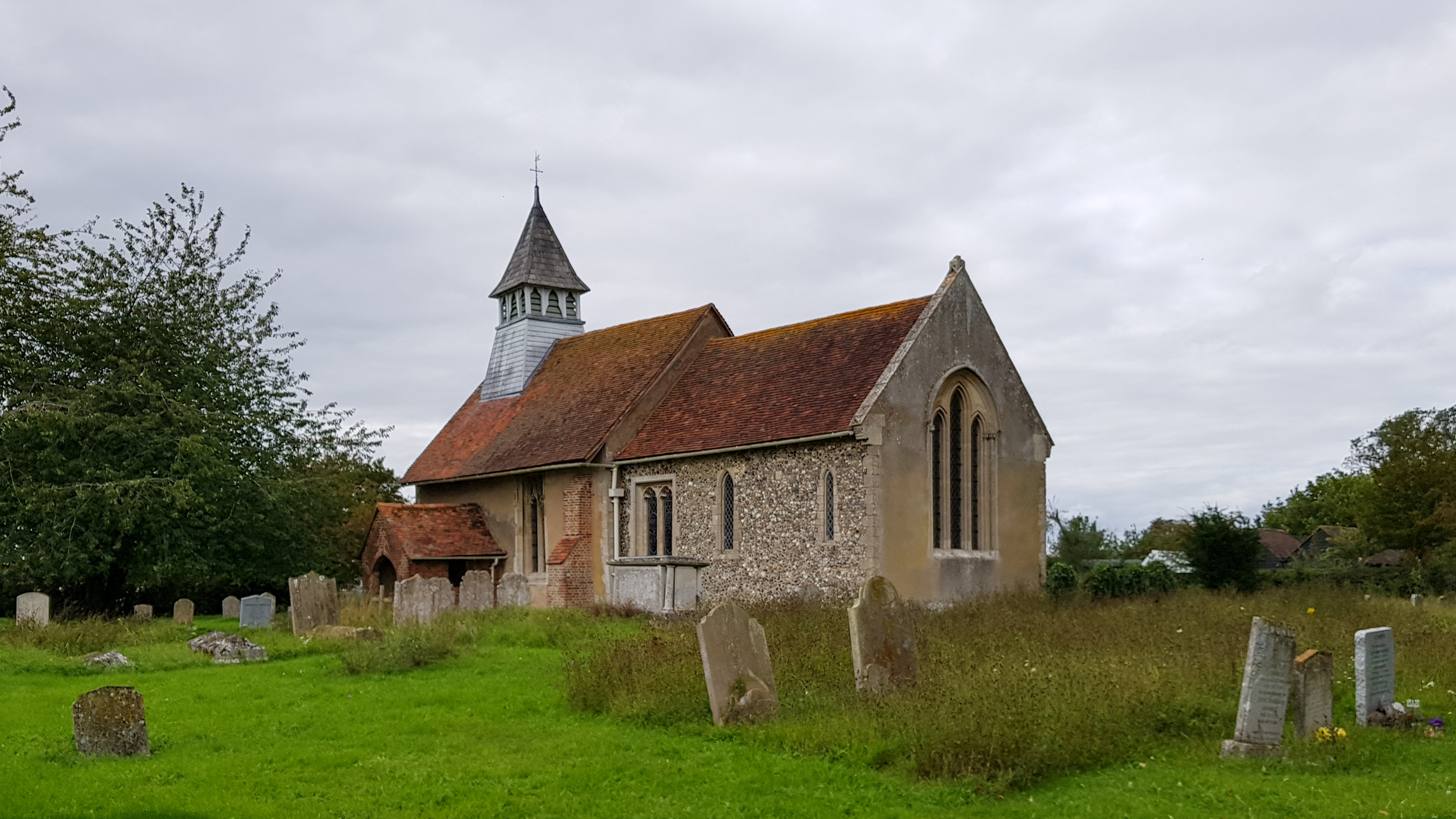
- St Mary's Church, Little Hormead. from the south-east

- Location in Hertfordshire
- OS grid reference: TL 398 291
- Location: Little Hormead, Hertfordshire
- Country: England
- Denomination: Anglican
- Website: Churches Conservation Trust

History
- Dedication: Saint Mary the Virgin

Architecture
- Functional status: Redundant
- Heritage designation: Grade I
- Designated: 22 February 1967
- Architectural type: Church
- Style: Norman, Gothic
- Groundbreaking: 11th century
- Completed: Renovated 1888
- Closed: 22 July 1997

Specifications
- Materials: Flint, tiled roofs

St Mary's Church is a redundant Anglican church in the village of Little Hormead, Hertfordshire, England. It is recorded in the National Heritage List for England as a designated Grade I listed building, and is under the care of the Churches Conservation Trust. The church is particularly noted for its Norman door, made of wood and ironwork. It is described as a "work of outstanding importance", and a "rare and precious survival".

== History ==
The church dates from the 11th century. It was recorded in the Domesday Book as serving the villages of Little Hormead and Great Hormead. The chancel was rebuilt in the early 13th century and a bellcote was added in the 15th century. A south porch was added in the 18th century. In 1888 the church was restored, during which the east end was rebuilt and the bellcote was reconstructed. In the 13th century St Nicholas' Church had been built in Great Hormead, and Little Hormead lost its independent rector in 1886. It was vested in the Churches Conservation Trust in 1995.

== Architecture ==
=== Exterior ===
St Mary's is constructed in flint with stone dressings. The south porch is in brick, and the roofs have red tiles. The bellcote is timber with a pyramidal roof. There is a canonical sundial on the south wall. The plan of the church consists of a tall narrow nave without aisles, a chancel at a lower level, a south porch, and a bellcote at the west end. Much of the church is Norman in style, particularly the nave. This includes the north and south doorways, a north window and the chancel arch. The south window in the nave dates from the 15th century. The two-light west window was inserted during the 1888 restoration and is in Perpendicular style. The east window in the chancel is a triple lancet. In the south wall of the chancel are two 13th-century lancet windows, a large 15th-century window, and a priest's door.

=== Interior ===
The octagonal font dates from the early 14th century and has panels of blank tracery around its bowl. In the southeast corner of the chancel is a 15th-century piscina. Above the chancel arch is a carved and painted Royal coat of arms of Charles II dated 1660.

The 12th-century north door, described as having a "most lavish display" of ironwork, is no longer "in situ", but is preserved inside the church. It consists of two interlacing quatrefoil patterns, around which is a border containing scrolls, all of which is surmounted by a serpentine dragon. Dendrochronology has confirmed that the trees from which the door is built were felled between about 1130 and about 1150.

== See also ==
- The Churches Conservation Trust: Little Hormead
