= Waeclingas =

The Waeclingas (Old English Wæclingas) were a tribe or clan of Anglo-Saxon England. Their territory or regio was based in the modern city of St Albans, whose name is recorded as Wæclingaceaster ("the former Roman fortification of the Wæclingas") in the writings of Bede in the early 8th century, and in an early 10th century Anglo-Saxon charter. Before the territory came under Mercian control around 660 it may have formed part of the province of the Middle Saxons, or it may have fallen under the influence of the Kingdom of Essex – neither is certain.

The name of the tribe comes from a personal name, meaning "the people of Wæcla". The tribe gave their name to Watling Street, the former Roman road from London to St Albans. The small town of Watlington in South Oxfordshire is also said to derive its name from the Waeclingas.

The tribal territory of the Waeclingas may have corresponded to the territory of the municipium of Verulamium, the Romano-British town that preceded St Albans. Together with the Brahhingas and the Hicce the Waeclingas were one of the most important tribes of the area that would later become the county of Hertfordshire, and its territory would evolve into some of the structures that would form the county's administrative framework.

== Bibliography ==
- Bailey, Keith (1989), "The Middle Saxons", in Bassett, Steven (ed.), The Origins of Anglo-Saxon Kingdoms, Leicester: Leicester University Press, pp. 108–122, ISBN 0718513177
- Williamson, Tom (2000), The Origins of Hertfordshire, Manchester: Manchester University Press, ISBN 071904491X
