= Hormead =

Civil parish in Hertfordshire, England

Coordinates: 51.949°N 0.024°E

- Civil parish
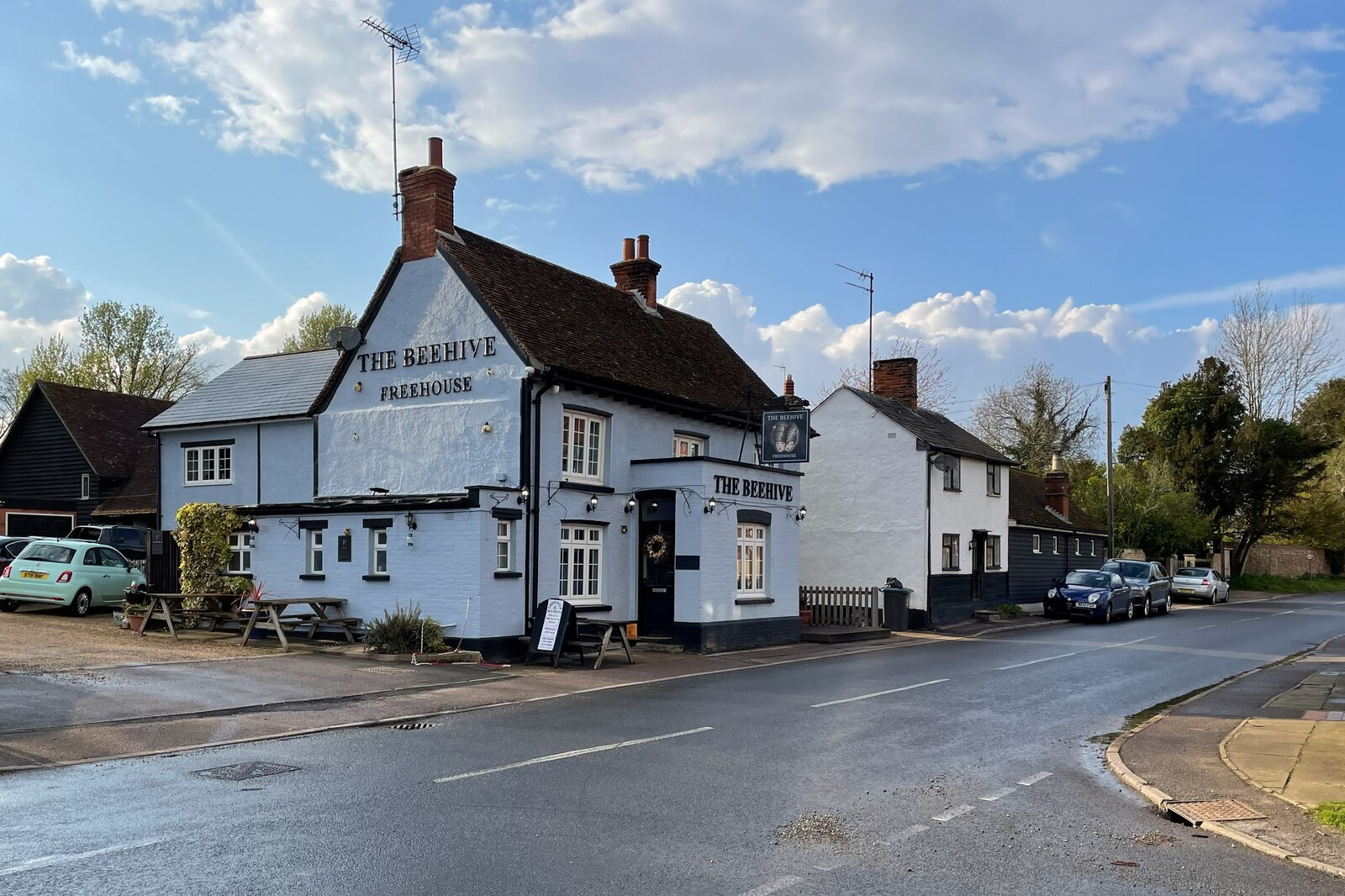
- The Beehive at Hare Street

- Location within Hertfordshire
- Population: 761 (Parish, 2021)
- Civil parish: Hormead
- District: East Hertfordshire
- Shire county: Hertfordshire
- Region: East
- Country: England
- Sovereign state: United Kingdom
- Post town: BUNTINGFORD
- Postcode district: SG9
- UK Parliament: North East Hertfordshire

Hormead is a civil parish in the East Hertfordshire district of Hertfordshire, England. It includes the villages of Great Hormead and Little Hormead and the hamlet of Hare Street and surrounding rural areas. Hare Street House is at Hare Street. The parish was created in 1937, when the separate parishes of Great Hormead and Little Hormead were abolished. At the 2021 census the parish had a population of 761.

== History ==
The Domesday Book of 1086 records three estates or manors at the vill of Horemede in the Edwinstree hundred of Hertfordshire.

A priest is recorded at one of the three Hormead manors in the Domesday Book, suggesting there was a church there. The area became the two parishes of Great Hormead and Little Hormead. Great Hormead parish had a detached exclave which was almost surrounded by Little Hormead parish; such exclaves were common where parishes had been created by subdivision of earlier territories.

Little Hormead's parish church, dedicated to St Mary, appears to be the older parish church, dating back to the 11th century. Great Hormead's parish church, dedicated to St Nicholas, stands about 500 metres (550 yd) north of St Mary's at Little Hormead, and dates from the 13th century.

The modern civil parish of Hormead was formed on 1 April 1937, merging the former parishes of Great Hormead and Little Hormead, alongside some more minor boundary adjustments with neighbouring Braughing and Layston at the same time.

== Governance ==
There are three tiers of local government covering Hormead, at parish, district, and county level: Hormead Parish Council, East Hertfordshire District Council, and Hertfordshire County Council. The parish council generally meets at the Meads Pavilion in Hare Street.

== See also ==
- The Hundred Parishes
