= Clara Walbey =

British novelist

- Born: 1819; Sandon
- Died: July 18, 1892
- Occupations: Novelist, poet, short story writer, writer

Clara Walbey (1819 – July 18, 1892) was a British novelist and poet.

Clara Walbey was born on 1819 in Sandon, Herefordshire. She was the eldest daughter of George George Fordham and Mary Clark Fordham of Sandon Bury. She married Robert Daniel Walbey, a railway company director.

Walbey published a novel, The Daughter of the South (1854), a volume of poetry, Thoughts in Metre (1890), and a collection of stories, From the Farm to the Battle-Field (1890). She also published numerous poems and essays in periodicals, including "Works of Fiction - Their Power and Tendency" in The People's Journal (1849), where she declared the purpose of fiction was "moral regeneration" and that "Whatever does not propel us forward on the hallowed track of improvement must [...] compel us to retrograde."

Clara Walbey died on July 18, 1892.

== Bibliography ==
- The Daughter of the South. 3 vol. London: Hurst and Blackett, 1854.
- Thoughts in Metre (as Mrs. R. D. Walbey). London: Hurst & Blackett, 1860.
- From the Farm to the Battle-Field. London: Simpkin, Marshall and Co., 1890.
