= Braughing Friars =

Hamlet in Hertfordshire, England

Coordinates: 51.89°N 00.04°E

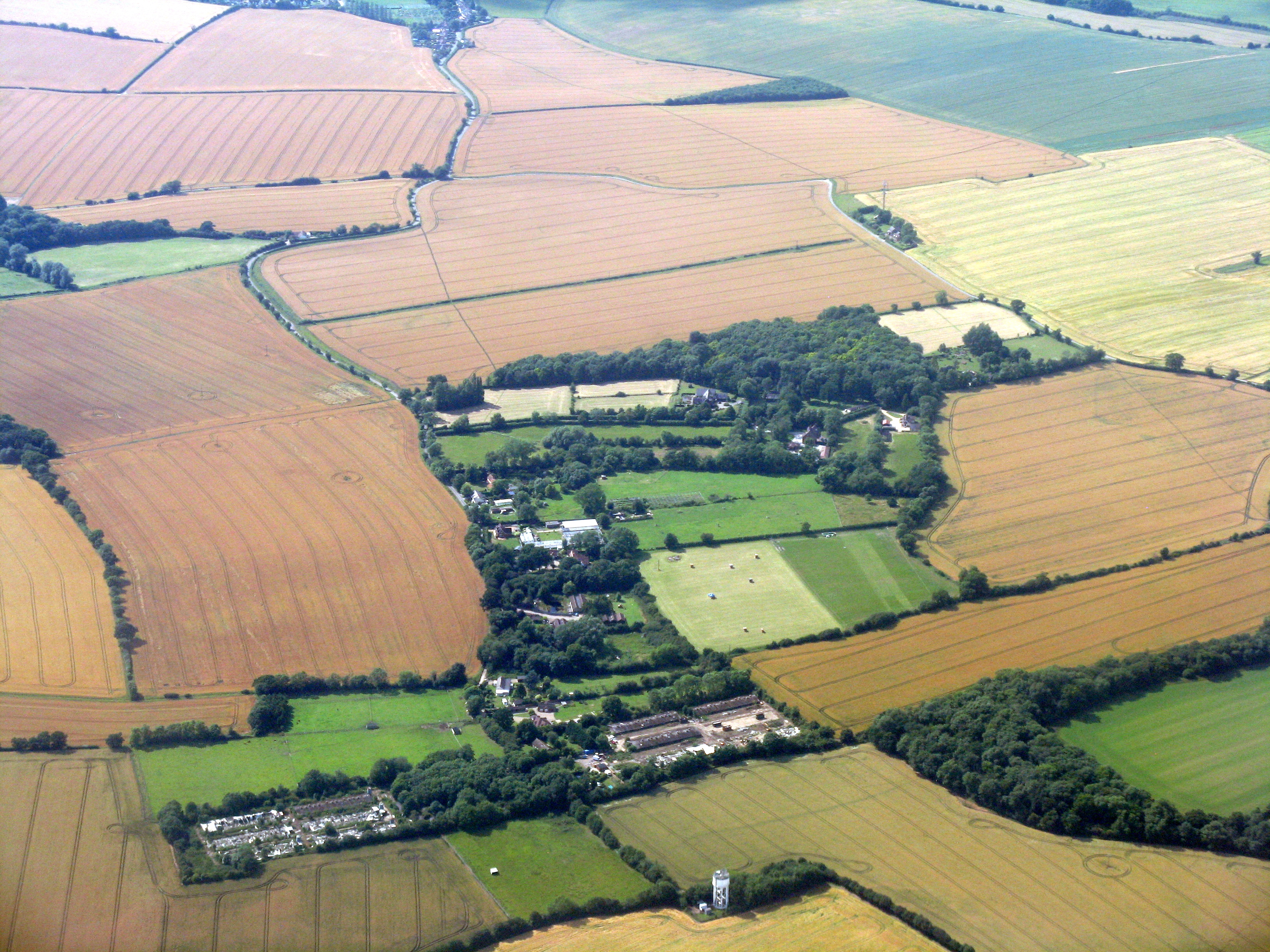
- Aerial view of farm

- Location within Hertfordshire
- OS grid reference: TL4124
- Shire county: Hertfordshire
- Region: East
- Country: England
- Sovereign state: United Kingdom
- Post town: Ware
- Postcode district: SG11 2
- Police: Hertfordshire
- Fire: Hertfordshire
- Ambulance: East of England

Braughing Friars is a hamlet in Hertfordshire, England. It is in the civil parish of Braughing.
