= Broadfield, Hertfordshire =

Hamlet in Hertfordshire, England

Coordinates: 51.96185°N 0.07376°W

Broadfield
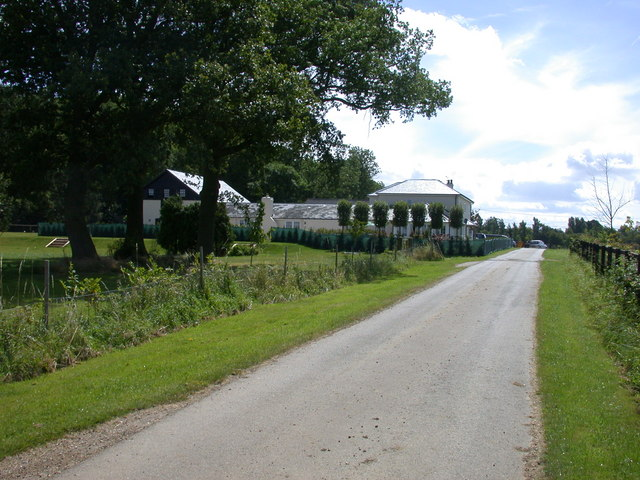
- Lodge Farm, Broadfield

- Location within Hertfordshire
- OS grid reference: TL324310
- Civil parish: Cottered
- District: East Hertfordshire
- Shire county: Hertfordshire
- Region: East
- Country: England
- Sovereign state: United Kingdom
- Post town: Buntingford
- Postcode district: SG9
- Dialling code: 01763

Broadfield is a hamlet in the civil parish of Cottered, in the East Hertfordshire district of Hertfordshire, England.

== History ==
Broadfield appears in the Domesday Book of 1086 when it had thirteen households and was split between four owners. No priest was listed at Broadfield, suggesting it was not a parish at that time. By 1222 there was a church at Broadfield, which seems to have been a chapel of ease belonging to the neighbouring parish of Rushden. The church was abandoned in the sixteenth century and no trace above ground now remains. The site is now a wood called Chapel Wood.

Arthur Pulter, a High Sheriff of Hertfordshire, inherited the manor of Broadfield in 1608, and with his wife, Lady Hester Pulter, began constructing Broadfield Hall as his manor house in the 1640s, but never completed the work. The house was demolished in about 1875: the stables are still standing and are a Grade II* listed building.

Broadfield was included in the Buntingford Poor Law Union from 1835. It was described variously as a former rectory, an extra-parochial area, or a township of the parish of Cottered. Parish functions under the poor laws were administered separately for Broadfield from Cottered. It therefore became a civil parish in 1866 when the legal definition of 'parish' was changed to be the areas used for administering the poor laws. By this time the settlement at Broadfield had shrunk to be just a couple of farms and cottages; the population of the parish in 1881 was just nineteen. Broadfield was included in the Buntingford Rural District from 1894, which was abolished in 1935 to become part of Braughing Rural District.

The civil parish of Broadfield was abolished in 1955, when its area was absorbed into parish of Cottered. At the 1951 census (the last before the abolition of the civil parish), Broadfield had a population of 20.
