= All Saints' Church, Sandon =

Coordinates: 51.9940°N 0.0752°W

All Saints' Church
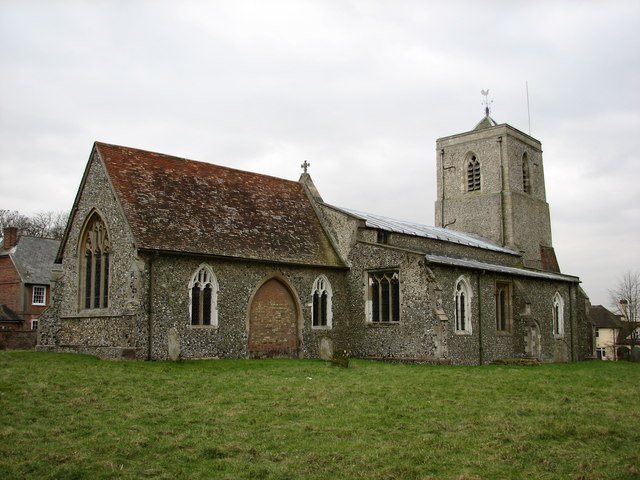

- Location of All Saints' Church, Sandon
- OS grid reference: TL 32237 34526
- Location: Sandon
- Country: England
- Denomination: Church of England

History
- Status: Active
- Dedication: All Saints

Architecture
- Functional status: Parish church
- Heritage designation: Grade I listed
- Years built: 1348 and later

Administration
- Diocese: St Albans
- Deanery: Buntingford

All Saints' Church is a Church of England Parish Church in Sandon, Hertfordshire, England. It is listed Grade I.

== History ==
At the time of the Domesday Book, Sandon was one of a number of manors in Hertfordshire which belonged to St Paul's Cathedral. The manor remained in the cathedral's ownership until the 19th century. The cathedral entered into a contract in 1348 to rebuild the chancel of All Saints'. This appears to be the earliest surviving part of the present church.
