= Leonard Arthur Hawes =

20th century British military officer

Major-General Leonard Arthur Hawes CBE DSO MC DL
- Born: 22 July 1892; Throcking, Hertfordshire, England
- Died: 7 August 1986 (aged 94); Petersfield, Hampshire, England
- Military career
- Allegiance: United Kingdom
- Branch: British Army
- Service years: 1911–1945
- Rank: Major-General
- Service number: 4767
- Unit: Royal Artillery
- Commands: South Midlands District (1942–45)
- Conflicts: First World War; Second World War
- Awards: Commander of the Order of the British Empire; Distinguished Service Order; Military Cross; Mentioned in Despatches; Order of the Crown of Italy
- Other work: Deputy lieutenant for West Sussex

Major-General Leonard Arthur Hawes, CBE, DSO, MC, DL (22 July 1892 − 7 August 1986) was a senior officer in the British Army who was responsible for preparing the transport to France of the British Expeditionary Force at the outbreak of the Second World War.

== Early life ==
Leonard Arthur Hawes was born on 22 July 1892 in Throcking, Hertfordshire. He was educated at Bedford Modern School and the Royal Military Academy, Woolwich, from where he was commissioned into the Royal Garrison Artillery in December 1911.

== Military career ==
Hawes served in the First World War during which he was wounded, mentioned in despatches, and awarded the Distinguished Service Order, the Military Cross and the Order of the Crown of Italy. In May 1915 he was appointed as a staff captain. In October 1919 he relinquished his appointment of a Deputy Assistant Adjutant General and was again made a staff captain.

Attending the Staff College, Camberley, from 1925 to 1926, Hawes was promoted to colonel in June 1938, with seniority backdated to January 1936, and appointed a GSO1 at the War Office.

He served as a major general during the Second World War. He was appointed a Commander of the Order of British Empire in 1940, and retired from the army in August 1945 with the honorary rank of major general.

Hawes was made a deputy lieutenant for the county of West Sussex in 1977, where he died on 7 August 1986, at the age of 94. His private papers, including an unpublished autobiography, are held by the Imperial War Museum.
