= Dassels =

Hamlet in Hertfordshire, England

Coordinates: 51.92691°N 0.02438°E

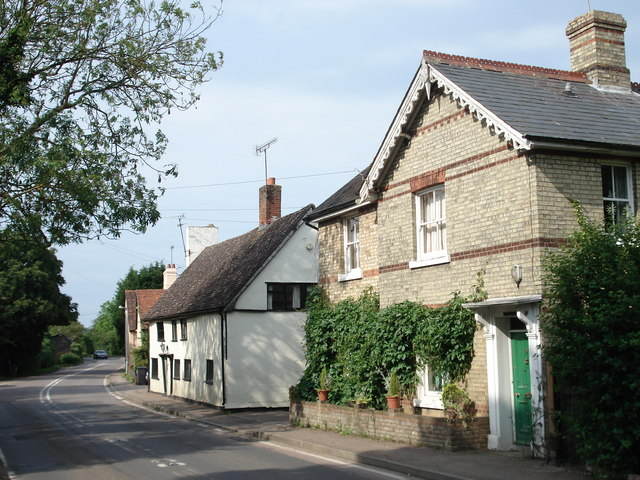
Cottages in Dassels

Dassels is a hamlet in the district of East Hertfordshire, in the county of Hertfordshire. Nearby settlements include the town of Ware and the village of Braughing. It is on the B1368 road. It is near the River Quin.
