= George Meriton =

English churchman

George Meriton (or Meryton) (died 1624) was an English churchman, Dean of Peterborough in 1612 and Dean of York in 1617.

== Life ==
He was born in Hertfordshire, probably at Braughing. His father was a tenant of Thomas Howard, 1st Earl of Suffolk, who inherited estates in Hertfordshire from his mother, and Meriton himself was born under the Earl's roof. He was educated at St. John's College, Cambridge, graduated B.A. in 1585, M.A. in 1588, and was on 4 July 1589 elected fellow of Queens' College. There he filled the post of junior bursar, 1596, senior bursar 1597, and proceeded B.D. in 1596, and D.D. in 1601.

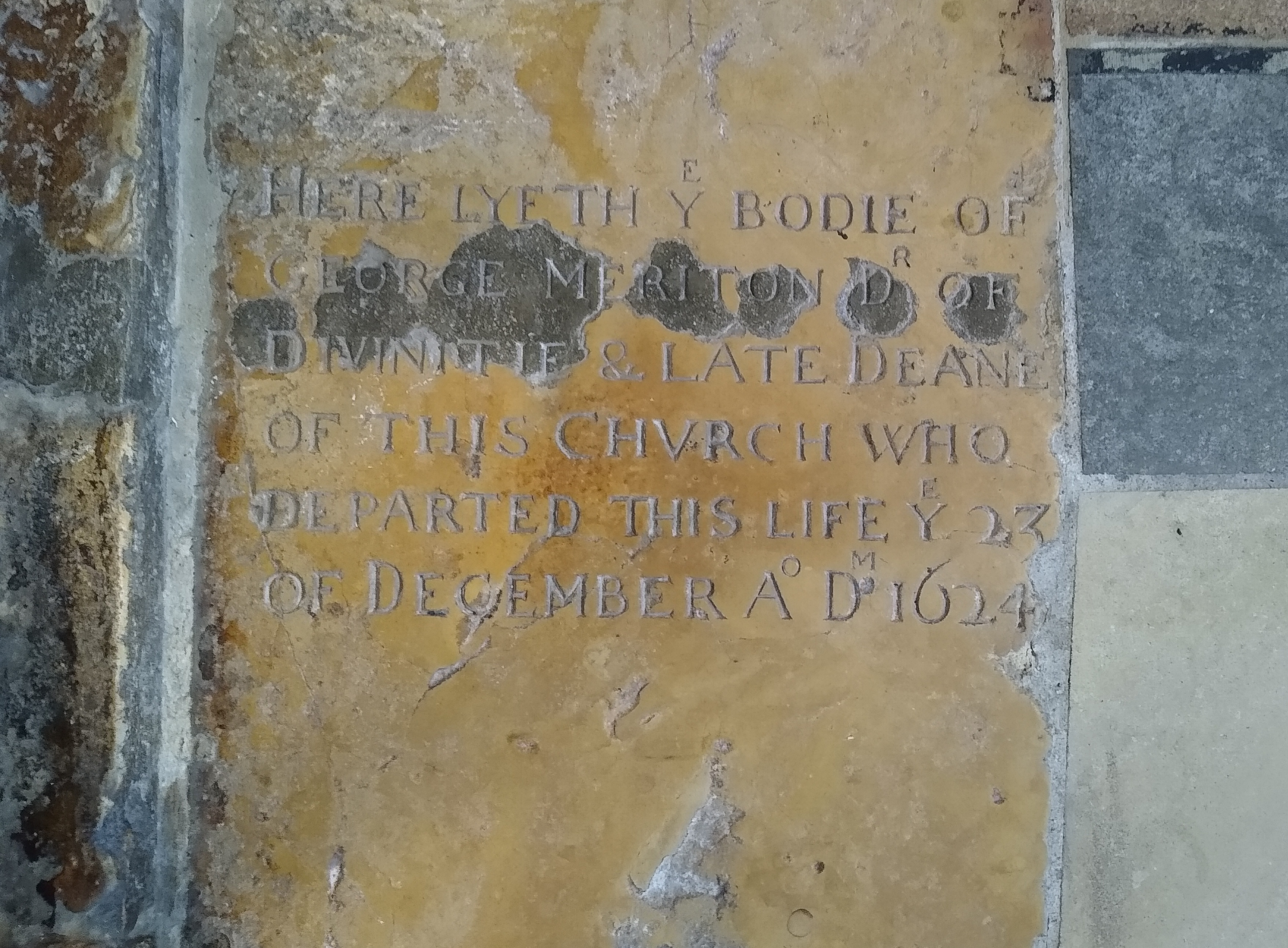
Resting place of George Meriton in York Cathedral

During his residence at Cambridge he made known his adherence to church establishment by frequent discussions on ceremonies which he held with Thomas Brightman in the chapel of Queens'. He was collated to the rectory of Hadleigh in Suffolk by Archbishop John Whitgift in 1599, and was appointed to the deanery of Bocking (usually held in conjunction with the rectory) on 24 May 1599. He was made Dean of Peterborough on 12 June 1612, was chaplain to Anne of Denmark, Dean of York on 27 March 1617, and prebendary of Tockerington in York Cathedral on 5 March 1617. He resigned Hadleigh in 1618, died on 23 December 1624, and was buried in York Cathedral.

== Works ==
He published:

- A Sermon of Nobilitie, London, 1607.
- A Sermon of Repentance, London, 1607.
- A Sermon preached before the General Assembly at Glasgow, London, 1611.
- The Christian Man's Assuring House, and a Sinner's Conversion, London, 1614.

== Family ==
Meriton married Mary Rands, granddaughter of Henry Rands, bishop of Lincoln, by whom he had several children, whose baptisms are recorded in the registers of Hadleigh.
