= Lady Hester Pulter =

British writer (1605–1678)

Lady Hester Pulter (née Ley) (1605–1678) was a seventeenth-century writer of poetry and prose, whose manuscript was rediscovered in 1996 in the Brotherton Library, University of Leeds. Her work includes poems, which are collected in the manuscript into sections titled "Poems Breathed Forth By the Noble Hadassas" and "The Sighes of a Sad Soule Emblematically Breath'd Forth by the Noble Hadassas," and an unfinished prose romance titled "The Unfortunate Florinda."

== Life ==
=== Birth ===
From the discovery of Pulter's manuscript until 2021, the precise date of Pulter's birth was a matter of scholarly debate. Calculations based on dates referenced in Pulter's poetry produced conflicting results, and material evidence from the historical record was scarce. However, analyzing a manuscript known as "The Declaracion of Ley," which was composed by Pulter's father and documents his children's birth dates, allows for a precise determination of Pulter's date of birth as 8 June 1605.

=== Background ===
Pulter was the daughter of James Ley, who became the first Earl of Marlborough in 1626, and Mary Ley (née Petty), James Ley's first wife. Pulter was one of eleven children. In 1620, at the age of fifteen, Hester married Arthur Pulter and proceeded to spend much of her life at his estate, Broadfield, Hertfordshire Hall, near Cottered in Hertfordshire. (See image here) The Pulters had fifteen children, seven sons and eight daughters, only two of whom outlived their mother. Although Arthur Pulter worked as a justice of the peace, militia captain, and sheriff, he withdrew from these public positions during the English Civil Wars. Hester Pulter began writing poetry during the 1640s and the 1650s. She died in 1678; the exact date is unknown, but she was buried on 9 April 1678. Pulter's husband outlived her, dying on 27 January 1689. They were survived by their only grandson, James Forester, and he became the family's sole heir.

=== Career ===
From the early 1640s until roughly 1665, Hester Pulter wrote more than one hundred poems as well as an incomplete prose romance. Annotations found in the Leeds manuscript indicate that some later readers did encounter Pulter's writing, but her poems were not published in her lifetime (as was common for many early modern writers, including Philip Sidney, John Donne, and George Herbert). There is no material evidence to suggest that Pulter's work enjoyed a wide readership. Until the rediscovery of the Leeds manuscript, Pulter was a relatively unknown contributor to British literature. Pulter is mentioned in Sir Henry Chauncy's history of Hertfordshire.

However, despite its limited readership, Pulter's work was not produced in complete isolation from a literary community. Pulter's mother was the niece of George Pettie, a writer of English romances. Her father was the subject of John Milton's Sonnet 10, which is addressed to her sister, Lady Margaret Ley. Scholar Karen Britland has suggested that neighbors living near Broadfield Hall may have brought Pulter into contact with a range of literary peers, and has argued that Pulter's poetry influenced the work of Andrew Marvell.

Beyond Pulter's social milieu, the subject of her writing indicates that her work was engaged with significant religious, scientific, and political debates of the time. Her devotional poems display an abiding concern with eschatology and theological conversations surrounding the issue of resurrection. Many of her poems utilize scientific language that suggests an engagement with the development of various fields such as alchemy, chemistry, atomism, and astronomy. And much of her poetry expresses royalist sentiments that indicate a significant interest in the political upheaval that surrounded her during the English Civil War.

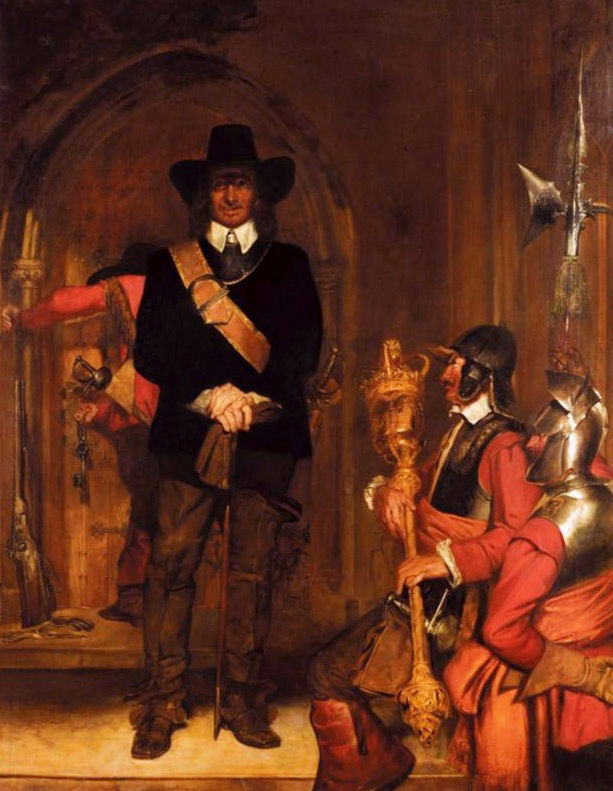
The English Civil War ended when Cromwell won at the 1645 Battle of Naseby. Afterwards, King Charles I was imprisoned, and later executed, inspiring many of Lady Hester Pulter's poems.

Following the discovery of Pulter's manuscript in the Brotherton Collection at the University of Leeds, her work has been increasingly recognized by scholars as a significant contribution to early modern literature. A complete edition of Pulter's writing first appeared in print in 2014 with the publication of Poems, Emblems, and The Unfortunate Florinda, edited by Alice Eardley. Beginning in 2018, the digital humanities project The Pulter Project: Poet in the Making (co-directed by Leah Knight and Wendy Wall) has worked to make Pulter's writing accessible to a wide audience online.

== Works ==
In the mid-1990s, scholar Mark Robson discovered the only known copy of Pulter's writing, a leather-bound manuscript held in the University of Leeds Brotherton Library. The first part of the manuscript consists of 64 poems collected under the section "Poems Breathed Forth by the Noble Hadassas," and 52 poetic emblems in the section "The Sighs of a Sad Soul Emblematically Breathed Forth by the Noble Hadassah." At the other end of the manuscript is an unfinished prose romance named "The Unfortunate Florinda." (See image here) The alias Hadassas or Hadassah, utilized in the section titles and some poems, is an epithet for the biblical queen Esther.

=== "Poems breathed forth by the Noble Hadassas" and "The Sighes of a Sad Soule Emblematically Breath'd Forth By the Noble Hadassas" ===
(See image here)

The manuscript's first section of poetry includes devotional, occasional, mythological, and elegiac verse. These poems address an expansive range of subjects including maternal loss, regicide, the civil war, the transformation of the body after death, astronomy, and the diversity of the natural world. The second section of the manuscript is made up of emblems, making Pulter the first known female author of a book of emblems in English. These poems use a figure from the natural world, biblical story, or mythology to prompt moral reflection, often to political or theological ends.

=== "The Unfortunate Florinda" ===
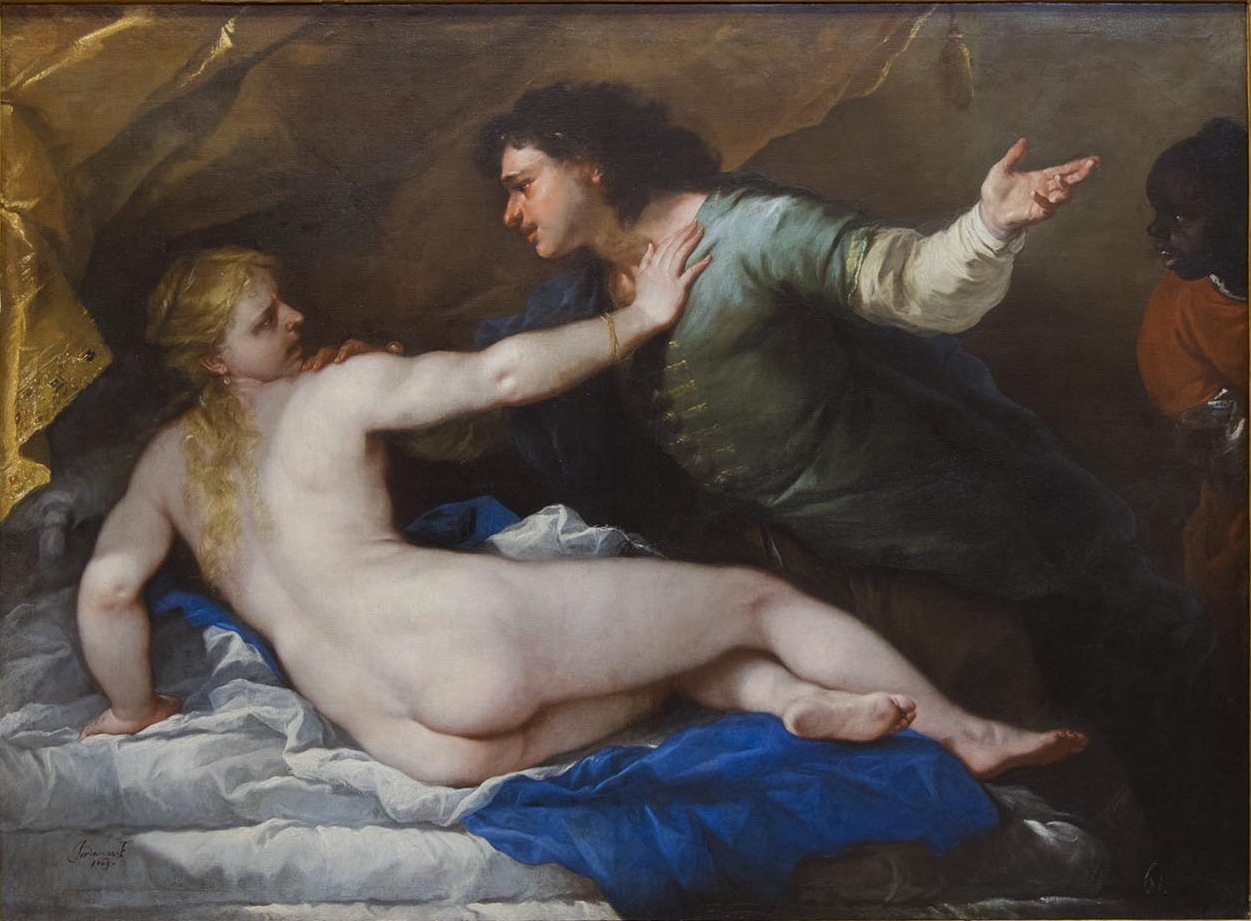
The Unfortunate Florinda contained many references to the Rape of Lucretia within it

The last section of the Leeds manuscript is titled The Unfortunate Florinda. A prose romance, it was left unfinished (as was common for romances such as Philip Sidney's Arcadia and Mary Wroth's Urania) and was transcribed between March and December 1661. The romance has interested scholars for its description of resistance in the face of sexual violence and its innovative retelling of the overthrow of Christian Spain in the eighth century. Some have suggested that the narrative offers an implicit critique of King Charles II's court.

==== Plot summary ====
The story takes place in Spain, when King Roderigo has taken over the throne. A group of African noblewomen are shipwrecked on the Spanish coast. Roderigo falls in love with the Moorish princess Zabra, and marries her after she converts to Christianity. However, Roderigo then lusts after Florinda, the daughter of a Spanish courtier and diplomat. Using his friend, Alphonso, Roderigo pursues Florinda. However, Florinda rejects him, causing Roderigo to hate her.

The narrative turns from the primary storyline to focus on Fidelia, Zabra's companion who was in Africa all this time, who arrives unexpectedly and tells her own story of adventure. In it, another African king, whom Pulter does not name, demanded Fidelia as his mistress on pain of death. Fidelia and her lover, Amandus, who is the Prince of Naples, kill the African king through a trick in bed. They escape, but are captured by pirates and separated.

In the main storyline, Roderigo rapes Florinda and threatens her with terrible things should she tell anyone else what occurred. Florinda, promising revenge, tells her father of the rape, and he joins in her search for revenge. The entire family, after learning what happened, are outraged by King Roderigo's actions. They all proceed to travel to Africa and ask King Almanzar to invade Spain, deeming regicide as an appropriate punishment for rape. Almanzar agrees to invade Spain, and the manuscript ends here.

== Engagement with Scientific Developments ==
=== Astronomy ===
Pulter embraced many astronomical discoveries of the seventeenth century. Poems such as "Universal Dissolution", "The Revolution", "A Solitary Complaint", and "Why Must I Thus Forever Be Confined" all express an interest in astronomical imagery. Tamara Mahadin points out that Pulter engaged Copernican cosmology, as seen in the beginning of her poem "A Solitary Complaint" with the lines, "Whenas those vast and glorious globes above / Eternally in treble motions move." The phrase "treble motions" reaffirms the Copernican theory of the planets revolving around the sun due to the new heliotropic center of the universe. Mahadin describes Pulter's use of the cosmos as a means for comfort since this interest offered an escape from the many pains she endured. Pulter's knowledge of recent astronomical discoveries acted as an opportunity for spiritual reflection within her domestic life. Leah Knight and Wendy Wall explain that in "The Revolution," Pulter's fascination with the reuse of her physical body in the heavens suggests the development of an intricate cosmology.

=== Alchemy ===
Scholars such as Jayne Archer and Alice Eardley highlight the remarkable knowledge of alchemy that Pulter demonstrates in her poetry. Alchemy, which scholars use to regard as a discredited knowledge superseded by the rise of modern science, is now understood as laying the foundation for experimental science. During Pulter's time, much medical and alchemical knowledge stemmed from the writings of Paracelsus, and was elaborated in part by the manifestos of Christian Rosencreutz and his followers. While Paracelsus focused on the alchemical aspects of medicine, he did not outwardly reject alchemy's longstanding interest in changing metal into gold, a process known as chrysopoeia. The Rosicrucians, followers of Christian Rosencreutz, furthered alchemy's breadth by including studies of the divine, the possession of secrets, and the world of a higher power. Eardly analyzes the importance of a spiritually-inflected alchemical rebirth as a key component of Pulter's poetry. Eardley first observed that Pulter's poem, "View But This Tulip (Emblem 40)," references "palingenesis," the alchemical method by which "dead flowers could be resurrected." Alchemy, a science that roots itself in change and transformation, was a perfect scientific method through which Pulter could explain many types of metamorphoses in her poems. For example, in "The Hope," Pulter references atoms, bones, and vitals to explain the journey of human death back to God, a shocking combination of scientific elements and religious beliefs. Another poem, "Heliotropians (Emblem 3)," also connects plants with death and rebirth through the description of a flower's ability to grow in a place deeper than where the dead are laid to rest. In addition to delving into the process by which Pulter obtained her deep scientific alchemical knowledge, Archer analyzes how Pulter utilizes alchemical references as a literary device and as an explanatory lens for representing complex human phenomena. The focal point of Archer's essay is Pulter's numerous poems sharing the title "The Circle," which are chock full of circular imagery and references to the cyclical nature of alchemy. Archer examines these poems as examples of Pulter's extraordinary ability to not only understand alchemy as a scientific process, but also to convert alchemical processes into poetic metaphors treating the circle of life.

== Bibliography ==
- Eardley, A. (2010). "Lady Hester Pulter's Date of Birth". Notes and Queries. 57 (4): 498–501. doi:10.1093/notesj/gjq153.
- Herman, Peter C. (2010). "Lady Hester Pulter's the Unfortunate Florinda: Race, Religion, and the Politics of Rape". Renaissance Quarterly. 63 (4): 1208–1246. doi:10.1086/658510.
- Robson, Mark (2004). "Pulter [née Ley], Lady Hester". Oxford Dictionary of National Biography. Oxford Dictionary of National Biography. Vol. 1 (online ed.). Oxford University Press. doi:10.1093/ref:odnb/68094. (Subscription, Wikipedia Library access or UK public library membership required.)
- Christian, Stefan G. (2012). The Poems of Lady Hester Pulter (1605?–1678): An Annotated Edition (PhD thesis). University of Massachusetts Amherst. ProQuest 1240643123.
- "Milton: Sonnet 10 - Notes". www.dartmouth.edu. Retrieved 2016-04-20.
- Eardley, A. (2008). Lady Hester Pulter's Book of Emblemes (Unpublished PhD Thesis). University of Warwick.
