= Wakeley, Hertfordshire =

Hamlet in England

Coordinates: 51.923421°N 0.051847100°W

Wakeley
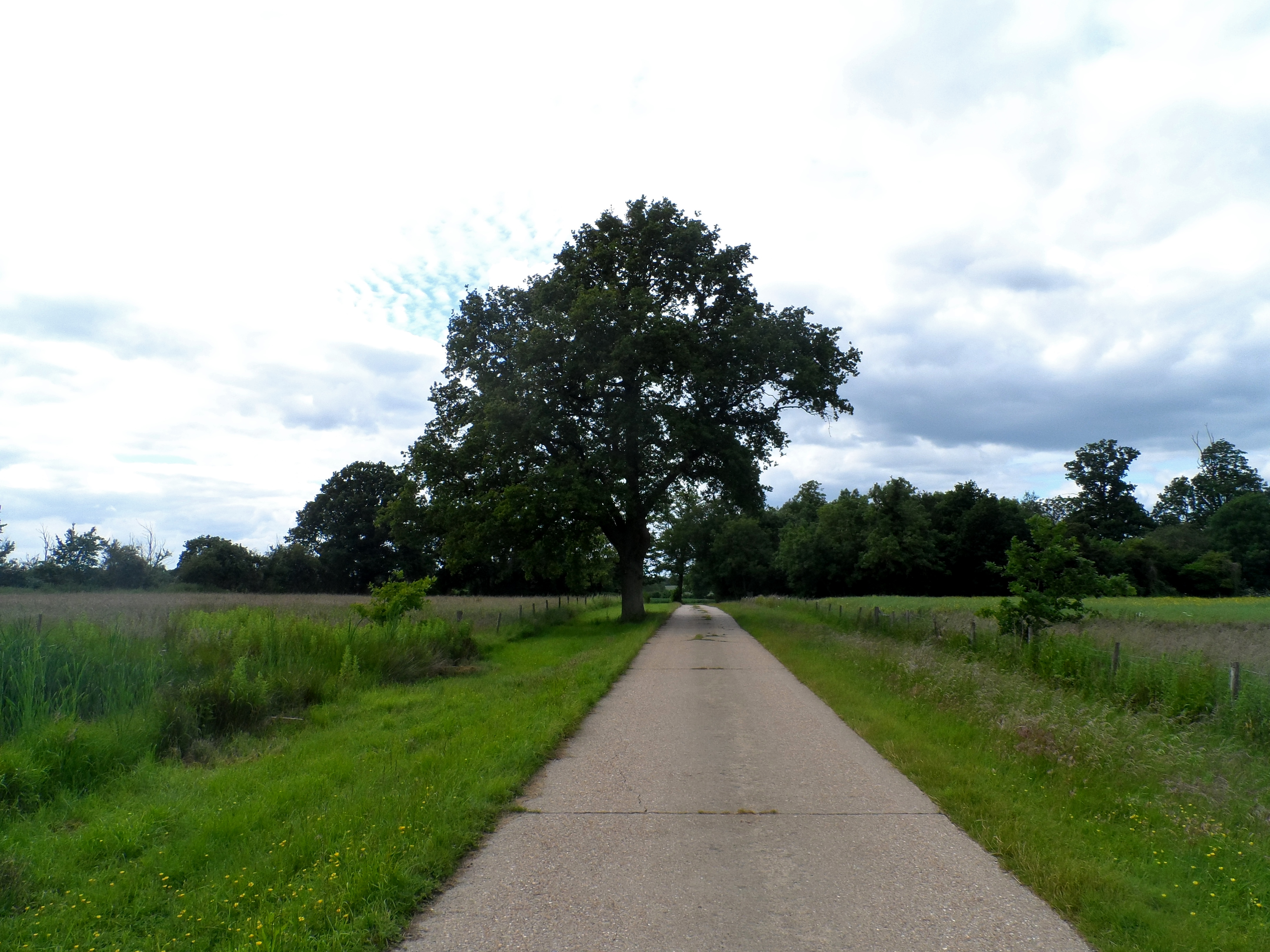
- Road coming into former parish

- Location within Hertfordshire
- OS grid reference: TL3426
- Civil parish: Westmill
- District: East Hertfordshire
- Shire county: Hertfordshire
- Region: East
- Country: England
- Sovereign state: United Kingdom
- Police: Hertfordshire
- Fire: Hertfordshire
- Ambulance: East of England

Wakeley is a hamlet in the civil parish of Westmill, in the East Hertfordshire district of Hertfordshire, England. It lies 14 miles (23 km) north of Hertford.

== History ==
The name "Wakeley" means 'Waca's wood/clearing'. Wakeley was recorded in the Domesday Book as Wachelei. "Wakely" is recorded as an alternative name for "Wakeley. The surname Wakeley derives from the village.

Wakeley is a deserted medieval village, which once had a church. It is therefore likely that it was anciently a parish.

After the desertion of the village and loss of its church, Wakeley became an extra-parochial area, outside any parish. In 1858 such extra-parochial areas were converted into civil parishes. The civil parish was abolished in 1883 and its area was absorbed into the neighbouring parish of Westmill. At the 1881 census (the last before the abolition of the civil parish), Wakeley had a population of 10.
