= Stane Street (Colchester) =

Roman road in England

Coordinates: 51.87103°N 0.33989°E

- Roman Road
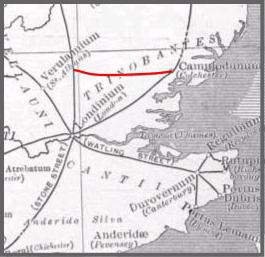
- Roman Britain, with Stane Street in red

Route information
- Length: 63 km (39 mi)
- Time period: Roman Britain
- Margary number: 32

Major junctions
- From: Braughing
- To: Camulodunum (Colchester)

Location
- Country: United Kingdom
- Counties: Hertfordshire, Essex

Road network
- Roman roads in Britannia

Stane Street is a 39 mi (63 km) Roman road that runs from Ermine Street at Braughing, Hertfordshire to Colchester in Essex.

== Route ==
Stane Street can be traced easily on an Ordnance Survey map as much of it has been incorporated into modern-day roads or still exists as paths, byways and tracks. It joins the A120 just east of Standon. From here on, the route of Stane Street has been used as the A120 (pre-bypasses of various towns) all the way to Colchester, namely:

- Heading east through Little Hadham and into Bishop's Stortford, where the road goes missing across the river valley, replaced by the Anglo-Saxon crossing of the River Stort some 600 metres to the south of the Roman crossing.
- East across the M11 and along the (old A120) B1256 through Takeley and into Great Dunmow, where the new A120 bypasses the old A120, which itself bypasses the centre of town and Stane Street.
- East towards and through Rayne and Braintree, then Coggeshall, Marks Tey and finally arriving in Colchester.
