= Braughing (Roman town) =

Coordinates: 51.900°N 0.015°E

Braughing was a small town in the Roman province of Britannia. Its name in Latin is unknown.

== Location ==
Today the site is partially occupied by the hamlet of Ford Bridge and straddles the civil parish boundary between Braughing and Standon, located in the English county of Hertfordshire. It is located at the navigable extremity of the River Rib (a tributary of the River Lea).

== Iron Age Settlement ==
Late Iron Age occupation in the area is represented by a number of ditches and enclosures and some excavated rectilinear timber buildings. Coins of Tasciovanus (c. 20BC - AD10) are known from the site identifying an associated with the Catuvellauni

== Roman Settlement ==
Soon after the Roman conquest of Britain and the construction of Ermine Street and Stane Street, the Braughing Roman settlement began to develop at the junction of these two roads. It appears to have had two population centres, on Wickham Hill and at Skeleton Green, but was never defensively enclosed. The occupied area of the Roman town covered an area of at least thirty-six hectares.

There was a planned street grid where thatched timber buildings, which lasted until about AD 60, were constructed. Not long afterwards substantial masonry structures were also constructed, including an L-shaped building with bath suite which was still in use in the 4th century, perhaps suggesting some official function. A temple or market hall have been suggested. There was more intensive occupation by the 2nd century, with commercial premises, domestic buildings and workshops. Industry included iron, bronze and bone working. There was large scale pottery production nearby. The Skeleton Green area later became a cemetery. The final Roman coin evidence from the site is associated with Arcadius (AD383 - 408).

Excavations were carried out between 1969 and 1973.
