= River Quin =

River in Hertfordshire, England

Coordinates: 52.002°N 0.015°E

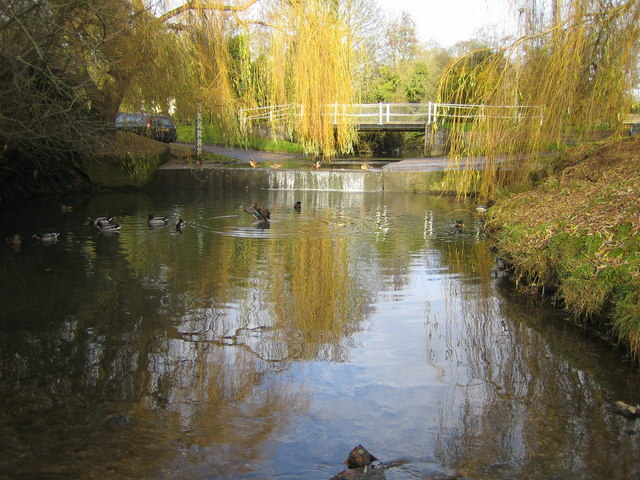
Maltings Lane Ford, Braughing

The River Quin is a small watercourse, a chalk stream, which rises near Barkway in north east Hertfordshire, England, and flows into the River Rib, which is a tributary of the River Lea.

== Course ==
Course of the River Quin

The river is fed by a number of sources including springs from Biggin Moor, Great Hormead Brook, Little Hormead Brook and various field ditches, including the Braughing Bourne - the site of a former glacier from the Ice Age. It flows south, close to the B1368 road to the southwest of Braughing where it joins the River Rib at Gatesbury. This area was the site of a former Roman settlement. Until recently the river was diverted at this point to irrigate watercress beds before flowing into the Rib.

The Quin Valley also includes the villages of Hare Street and Great Hormead as well as the smaller settlements of Hay Street and Dassels. The valley is shallow around the river with gently sloping sides at the northern end, becoming slightly narrower with steeper sides at the southern end of the area. Its sides are dominated by open arable farmland in small to medium fields with some occasional large fields particularly at the northern end. There is an absence of woodland and few mature trees grow alongside the river.

In Braughing, there are two ford crossings, one at Sheeps Lane and the other at Maltings Lane. The river is prone to severe flooding after heavy rain, rendering the fords impassable, particularly in the autumn and winter months. In 1922, a donkey and cart were swept away when its owner tried in vain to cross Sheeps Lane Ford. The animal was drowned.
