= Sandon, Hertfordshire =

Village in Hertfordshire, England

Coordinates: 51.99269°N 0.07660°W

Sandon
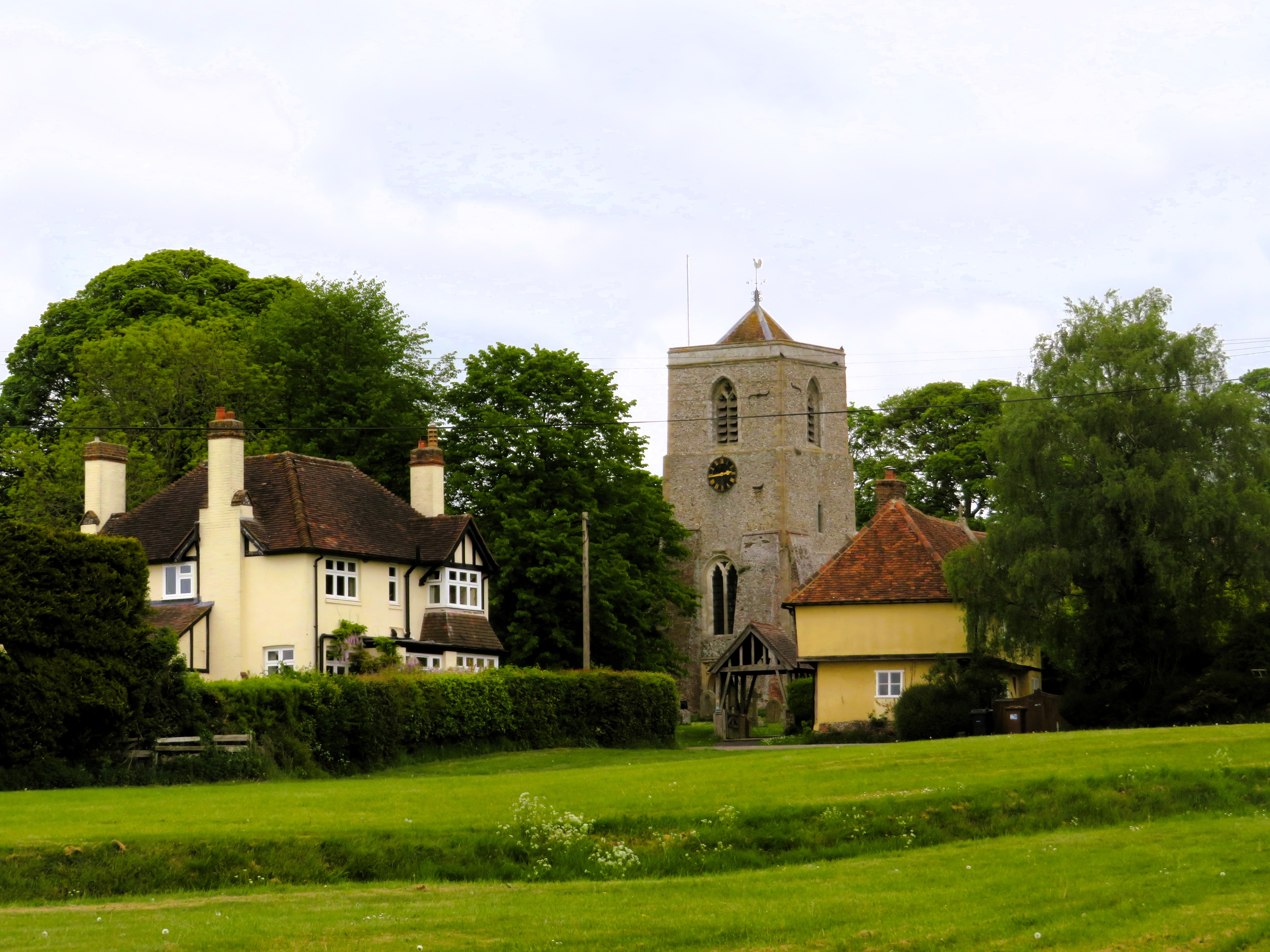
- View across green towards All Saints' Church

- Location within Hertfordshire
- Population: 493 (Parish, 2021)
- OS grid reference: TL322344
- District: North Hertfordshire
- Shire county: Hertfordshire
- Region: East
- Country: England
- Sovereign state: United Kingdom
- Post town: Buntingford
- Postcode district: SG9
- Dialling code: 01763
- Police: Hertfordshire
- Fire: Hertfordshire
- Ambulance: East of England
- UK Parliament: North East Hertfordshire

Sandon is a village and civil parish in the North Hertfordshire district of Hertfordshire, England. The village lies 4 miles (6 km) north-west of Buntingford, its post town, and 5 miles (8 km) east of Baldock. The parish also includes the hamlets of Green End and Roe Green, and Blagrove Common, a nature reserve. The population of the parish was 493 at the 2021 census.

== Geography ==
The ancient Icknield Way, now part of the A505 road, forms part of the northern boundary of the parish of Sandon, but there is little development in the parish near that road. Instead, settlement in the parish is in a number of clusters on a chalk ridge to the south, including Church End and Payne End (which have coalesced to form the main village today), alongside Roe Green nearby to the west. To the south-east, on a tributary of the River Rib, lie the hamlets of Green End and Mill End. Gannock Green is a small hamlet to the north of the village.

The Icknield Way Path does not follow the ancient route of the road in this area, which is now a busy dual carriageway. Instead, the footpath passes through Sandon village on its 110-mile (180 km) journey from Ivinghoe Beacon in Buckinghamshire to Knettishall Heath in Suffolk.

== History ==
Sandon appears in the Domesday Book of 1086, when it was owned by the canons of St Paul's Cathedral in London. A priest was mentioned as one of the householders at Sandon, suggesting it was already a parish by then.

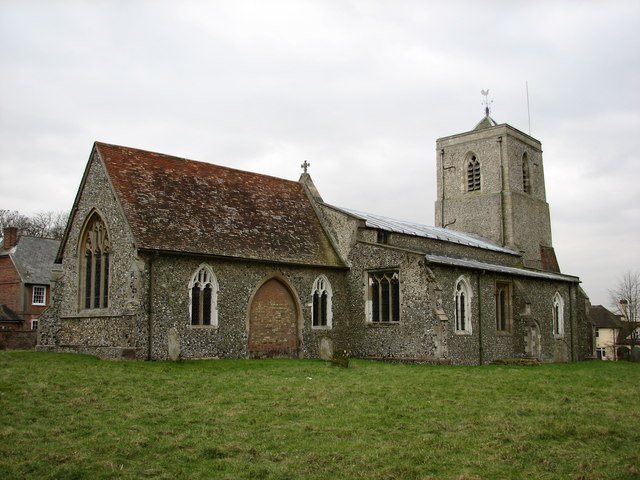
All Saints Church

The parish church of All Saints was rebuilt in phases from the mid-14th century. The earliest surviving fabric in the current building is the chancel, which is known to have been rebuilt around 1348; the nave was subsequently rebuilt around the 1360s and the tower and porch were added around 1400. Substantial brick buttresses were added to the tower for support in the 17th century.

The manor house, known as Sandon Bury, stands to the south of the church. The current house there dates from 1661. One of the barns in the farmyard at Sandon Bury appears to be a rare surviving medieval barn. Analysis by dendrochronology indicates that the barn's timbers were probably felled between 1266 and 1268.

== Governance ==
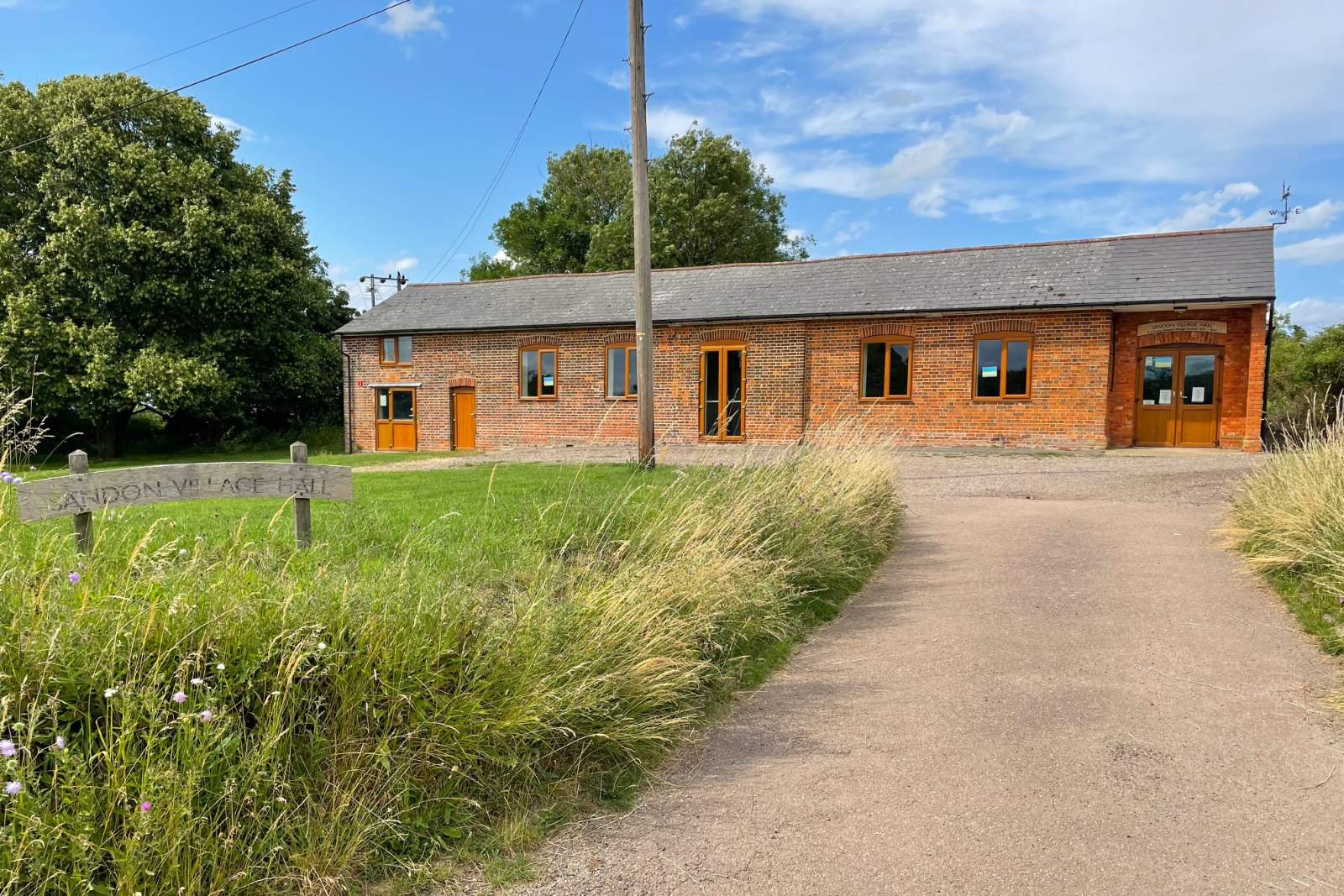
Sandon Village Hall

There are three tiers of local government covering Sandon, at parish, district, and county level: Sandon Parish Council, North Hertfordshire District Council, and Hertfordshire County Council. The parish council meets at the village hall on the green.
