= Layston =

Deserted village in Hertfordshire, England

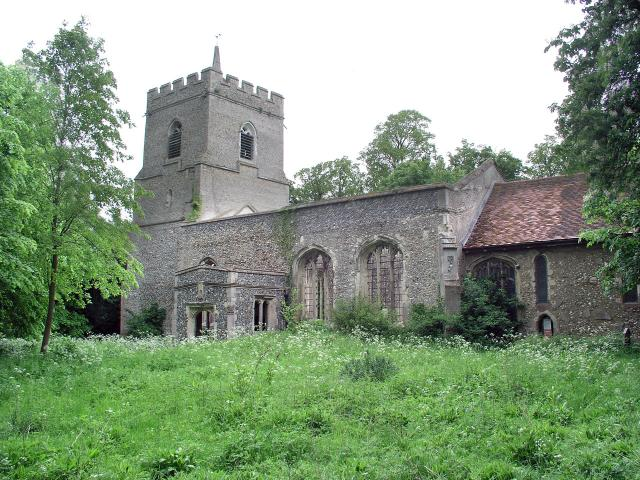
- The formerly roofless St Bartholomew's Church

- Location within Hertfordshire
- Civil parish: Buntingford
- District: East Hertfordshire
- Shire county: Hertfordshire
- Region: East
- Country: England
- Sovereign state: United Kingdom
- Police: Hertfordshire
- Fire: Hertfordshire
- Ambulance: East of England

Layston is a former village and parish located one-half mile (0.80 km) north-east of Buntingford in the East Hertfordshire district, in the county of Hertfordshire, England, at 51°57′50″N 0°00′45″E.

In 1931 the parish had a population of 724. On 1 April 1937 the parish was abolished and merged with Buntingford and Wyddial, part also went to form Hormead.

Its former church, St Bartholomew's, became derelict but is the subject of a restoration project. People connected with the church include:

- Thomas Crouch, who was baptised in St Bartholomew's in 1607
- Robert Wogdon (January 1734 – 28 March 1813), founder of the gunsmith firm Wogdon & Barton, who was buried in the chancel with his wife, who had died in 1805
- Rev. Jonathan Gilder and Mary Brazier, who were married there in 1759; their daughter Sarah, baptised there in 1767, became (posthumously) the maternal grandmother to New Zealand suffragette Catherine Fulton
- Claud Lovat Fraser (15 May 1890 – 18 June 1921), who was buried in the churchyard.
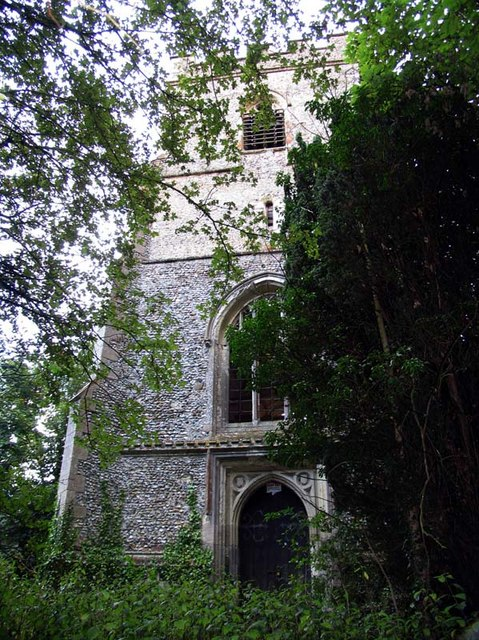
- Joseph Ironmonger Snoxell (1743-1810) of Stanmore, Middlesex, married Martha Moore (1740-1785) in the church on 15 November 1763. He owned or leased farms in Great and Little Stanmore, and Hatch End, Middx; Hitchin and Watford, Herts; and Barton, Cambridgeshire. Husband and wife are buried next to the ruined church at Stanmore, where there are memorials to them.

There is a state-funded primary school, Layston First CE School.
