= Cottered =

Village in Hertfordshire, England

Coordinates: 51.95°N 0.083333°W

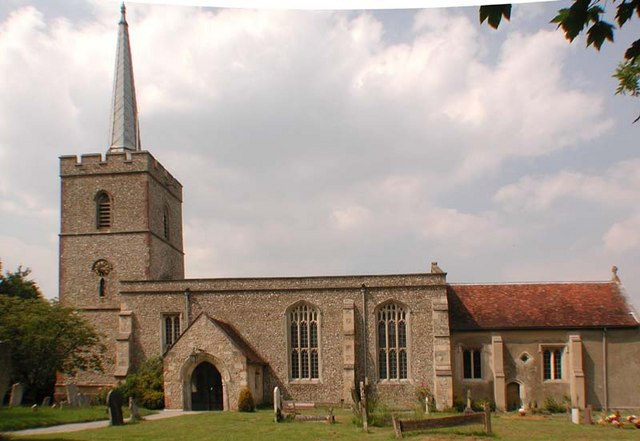
- St John the Baptist Church

- Location within Hertfordshire
- Population: 623 (Parish, 2021)
- OS grid reference: TL3129
- Civil parish: Cottered
- District: East Hertfordshire
- Shire county: Hertfordshire
- Region: East
- Country: England
- Sovereign state: United Kingdom
- Post town: BUNTINGFORD
- Postcode district: SG9
- Dialling code: 01763
- Police: Hertfordshire
- Fire: Hertfordshire
- Ambulance: East of England
- UK Parliament: North East Hertfordshire

Cottered is a village and civil parish in the East Hertfordshire district of Hertfordshire, England. It lies 3 miles (5 km) west of Buntingford, its post town and 6 miles (10 km) south-east of Baldock. At the 2021 census the parish had a population of 623.

Cottered is home to a Japanese garden designed in the early 20th century by Herbert Goode, at the Garden House. It is listed Grade II* on the Register of Historic Parks and Gardens.

North of Cottered, on a private drive off Throcking Road, is Broadfield House. This was rebuilt for the poet Lady Hester Pulter (née Ley) (1605–1678), daughter of the Earl of Marlborough, and her husband Arthur Pulter. Their daughter Margaret married John Forrester: their son James (d.1696) had Broadfield Hall extended, with stables designed by Nicholas Hawksmoor which are now Grade II listed.

Among those who have held the living of Cottered may be mentioned the Rev Anthony Trollope, who was grandfather of the authors Anthony Trollope and Thomas Adolphus Trollope. He was incumbent of Cottered for forty-four years and died in 1806.

Cottered also has a blue plaque to the first president of the Republic of China Sun Yat-sen, who stayed at The Kennels, country home of James Cantlie.

It has a football club, Cottered FC.

A Manor House built in the 1400s, said to be the "oldest inhabited house in Hertfordshire", stands in Cottered. "The Lordship" is a Grade I listed building. The summary states: "Early-mid C15 (probably for John Fray who held the manor 1428-1461...), altered in early C17 ... chimney dated 1699, later modernizations ...". According to a 2021 report in Country Life, the property was owned by Gwilym Lloyd George in the 1950s. The subsequent owners maintained the house well, but it was due for "some gentle updating".
