= Braughing =

Village in Hertfordshire, England

Coordinates: 51°54′N 00°02′E

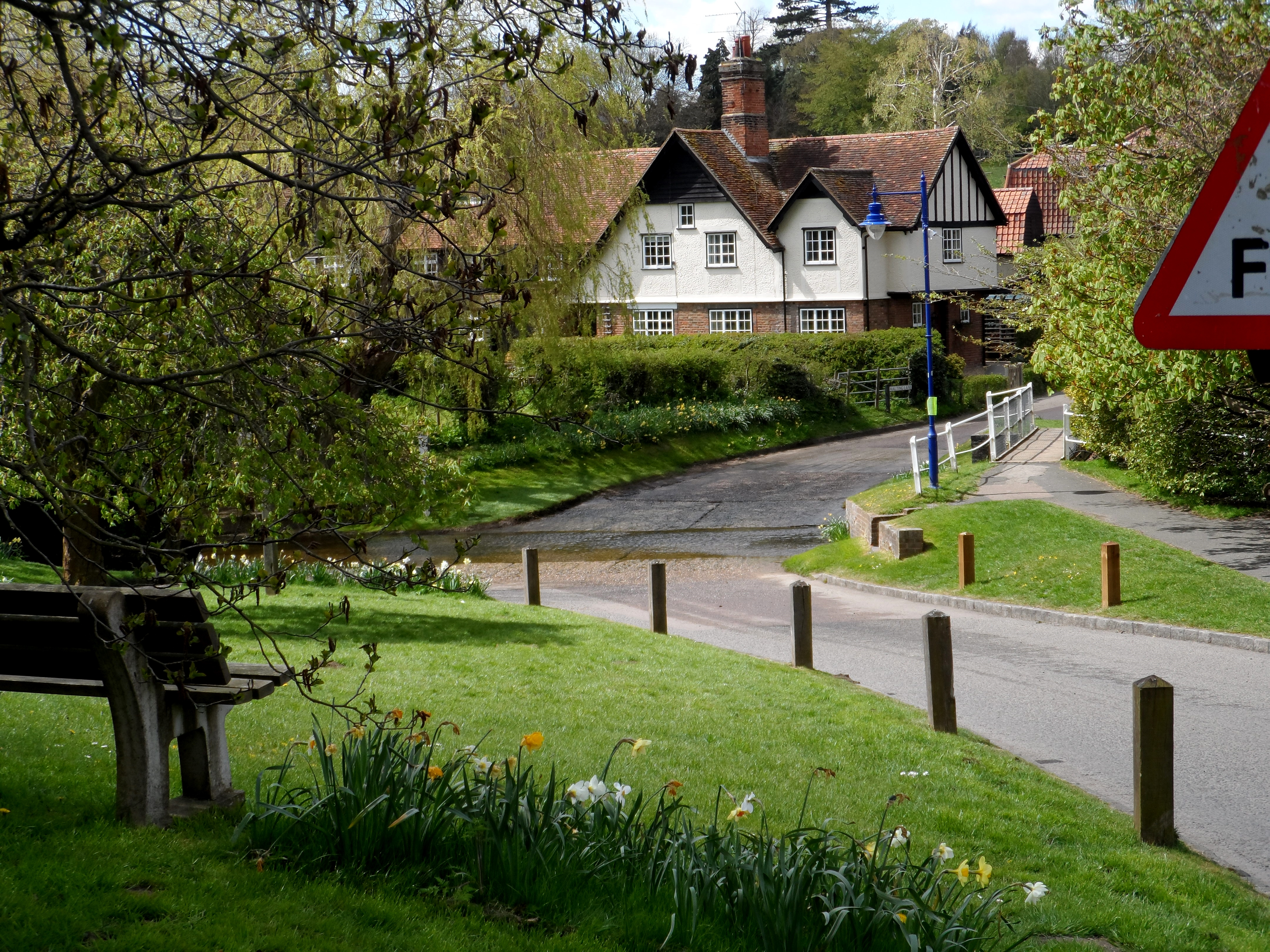
- The ford across the River Quin in the village

- Location within Hertfordshire
- Population: 1,351 (Parish, 2021)
- Civil parish: Braughing
- District: East Hertfordshire
- Shire county: Hertfordshire
- Region: East
- Country: England
- Sovereign state: United Kingdom
- Post town: Ware
- Postcode district: SG11
- Police: Hertfordshire
- Fire: Hertfordshire
- Ambulance: East of England
- UK Parliament: North East Hertfordshire

Braughing /ˈbræfɪŋ/ is a village and civil parish in the East Hertfordshire district of Hertfordshire, England. The village lies 7 miles (11 km) north of Ware, its post town. It stands on the River Quin, near its confluence with the River Rib. As well as the village itself, the parish covers surrounding rural areas, including the hamlets of Bozen Green, Braughing Friars, and Dassels. At the 2021 census the parish had a population of 1,351.

A Roman town stood to the south-west of the modern village, on the opposite bank of the Rib, near the junction of the Roman roads of Ermine Street and Stane Street. Braughing was a place of some importance in medieval times, giving its name to the Braughing Hundred of Hertfordshire. It later also gave its name to the Braughing Rural District which existed between 1935 and 1974.

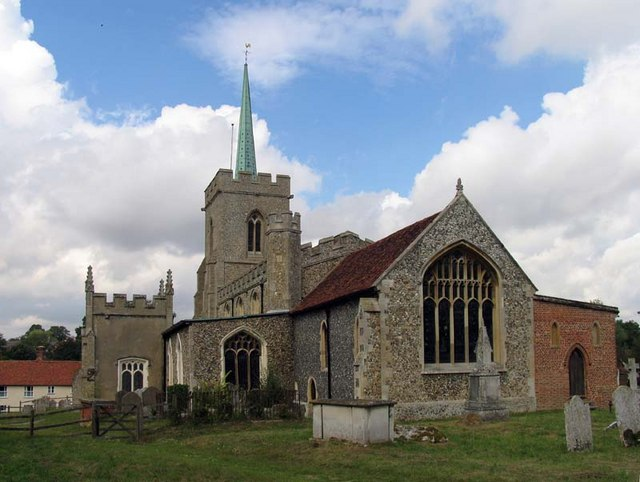
St Mary, Braughing, a Grade I listed building.

== History ==
=== Prehistory ===
There is some evidence of human activity in the Mesolithic, Neolithic and Bronze Age, but settled habitation began in the Iron Age, around the 3rd century BC. It was possibly a trading post, situated on the navigable extreme of the Rib, providing a route to the larger River Lea. In the late Iron Age (100BC – 43AD) it was the site of the largest 'Celtic' mint discovered in Europe.

=== Roman times ===
There were significant Iron Age and Roman settlements at Wickham Hill, near Braughing. This is situated at the junction of several major Roman roads, including Ermine Street (now the A10), Stane Street (now the A120) and the Great Chesterford Road. This covers at least 36 hectares.

When the River Rib is in full flood, bricks, tiles and other more interesting artefacts from the Roman settlement are washed onto its banks.

=== Saxon times ===
After the Roman period it was settled by the Anglo-Saxons: the earliest form of the name Braughing is Breahinga, Old English for the people of Breahha, who was probably a local leader. It is mentioned in the Domesday Book of 1086 as Brachinges.

=== Gatesbury ===
Little remains of this hamlet, which lies to the east of the B1368 close to the Puckeridge junction. Originally part of Westmill parish, Gatesbury is now within the parish of Braughing. Its name originates from the Gatesbury family, who held the manor from the late 12th century up to the 15th century, when it was passed to the FitzHerberts.

== Customs ==
=== Old Man's Day ===
On 2 October 1571, as the funeral bell was being tolled, the coffin of a local farmer, Matthew Wall, was being carried down Fleece Lane towards the Parish Church of St Mary the Virgin.

Wall's fiancée and other mourners were deeply distressed. As they made their way to the funeral service, one of pallbearers slipped on the damp autumn leaves and they dropped the coffin – waking the young man. Confused and wondering where on earth he was, he began frantically hitting the inside of the wooden case with his fist. The mourners removed the lid and were overjoyed to find him alive.

Matthew had probably been in a coma after suffering from what is believed to be a form of epilepsy. A year later, he married his fiancée; he lived many more years and had two sons. When he did die in 1595, his will made financial provision for Fleece Lane to be swept each year, after which the funeral bell, and then a wedding peal, were to be rung. The money, invested in 'Braughing Parish Charities' also paid for his grave to be pegged with brambles to prevent grazing sheep from damaging it.

2 October is still known as 'Old Man's Day'. The tradition continues and schoolchildren now sweep the leaves from the lane, the bells are rung, and a short service is held at Matthew Wall's graveside.

=== Wheelbarrow race ===
On the second weekend of July the Braughing Wheelbarrow race takes place. This event started in 1964 with teams of two pushing a wheelbarrow round a 400-metre course through the village streets, starting and finishing in the village ford.

== Transport ==
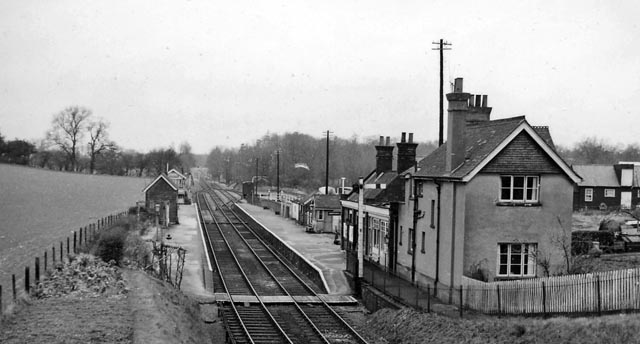
Braughing Station in 1961

There was a station on the ex-Great Eastern Railway St Margaret's – Buntingford branch which closed in 1964. The station featured in the comedy film Happy Ever After which starred David Niven and George Cole in 1953. The location was temporarily renamed Rathbarney, an Irish hamlet.

== Famous residents ==
- John Brograve, (1538–1613), a lawyer and politician, was the member of parliament for Preston, and was custos rotulorum, keeper of the county records of Hertfordshire for thirty years.
- Brigadier Richard Hanbury was High Sheriff of Hertfordshire in 1960.
- Brodie Henderson, (1869 – 1936), was in charge of railway lines used to transport Allied troops and supplies during the First World War and worked for many railroad corporations across South America, Australasia and Africa. He was High Sheriff of Hertfordshire in 1924.
- George Meriton (born in Braughing, circa 1564 and died 1624) was a churchman who became Dean of Peterborough in 1612 and Dean of York in 1617.
- Vera Strodl Dowling (1918–2015), pilot
- Charles Ward (born in Braughing in 1875) was an English cricketer who died in 1954.
- Sally Wentworth, the pseudonym used by Doreen Hornsblow (1930s –2001), was a romantic novelist and writer of seventy novels in Mills & Boon from 1977 to 1999.

== See also ==
- The Hundred Parishes
