= Middle Saxons =

Anglo-Saxon people

Essex and Middlesex during the Heptarchy.

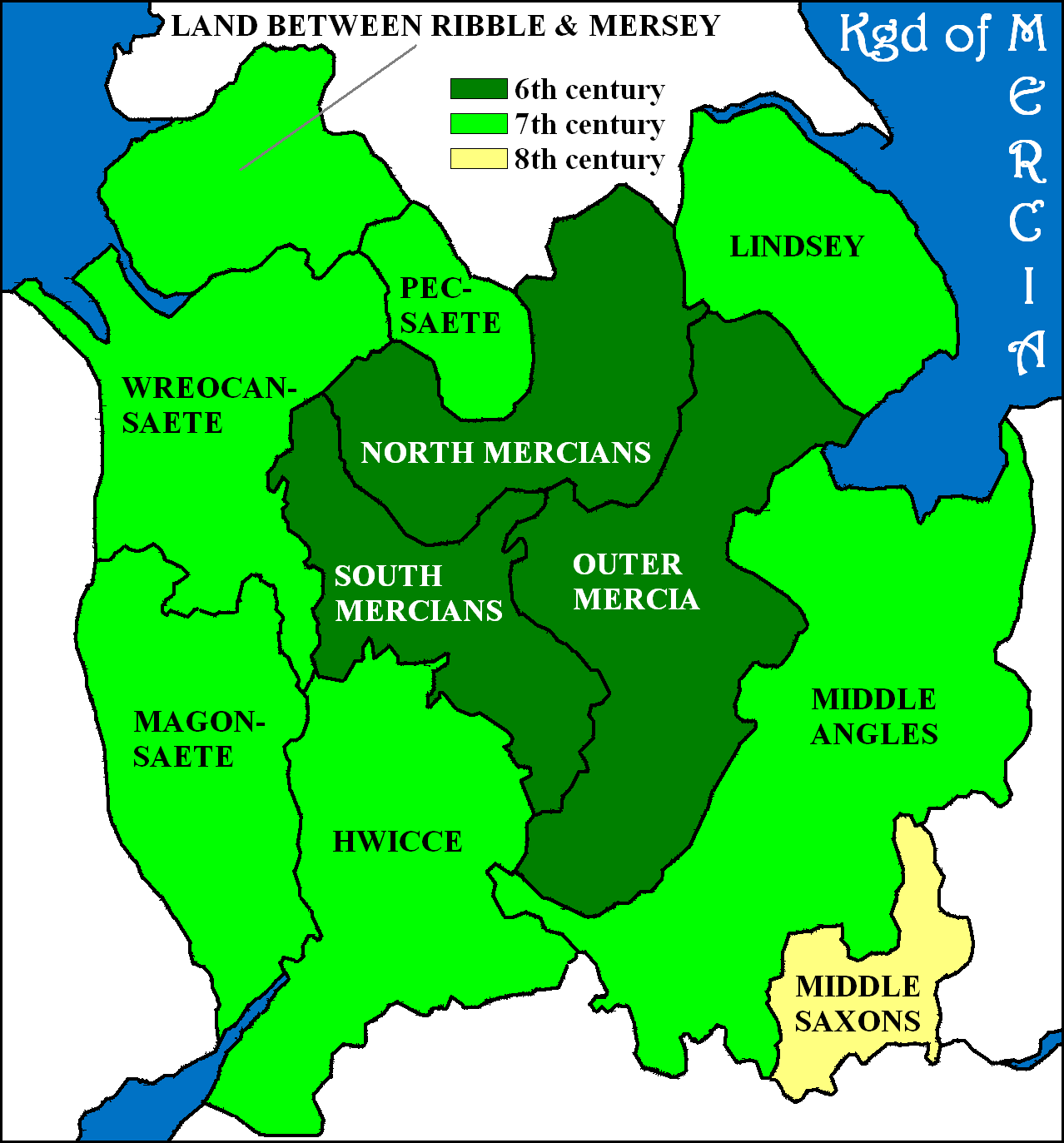
Middle Saxons (yellow) shown when their area was subject to Mercia.

The Middle Saxons or Middel Seaxe were a people whose territory later became, with somewhat contracted boundaries, the county of Middlesex, England.

The first known mention of Middlesex stems from a royal charter of 704 between king Swæfred of Essex, the abdicating king Æthelred of Mercia and succeeding king Coenred of Mercia, granting some land to bishop Walhere in Tuican hom (Twickenham) in the provincia called Middleseaxan.

It likely included the early London settlement, Lundenwic, and probably Surrey, the "south region" of the Middle Saxon territory. There is also some evidence that may suggest Middle Saxon settlement in western Kent.

The name reflects the situation of these people being in the middle between the South Saxons, the East Saxons and the West Saxons, and distinguishing them from the Angles in the north. Unlike these neighbours, the Middle Saxons did not manage to create a lasting kingdom of their own. According to G. F. Bosworth (1913), 'there is no evidence that Middlesex was originally a separate kingdom, and we may say with a considerable amount of certainty that it formed part of the kingdom of Essex (...).' However, F.M. Stenton (1971) comments that the Middle Saxon's "original independence is at least probable". The area was part of the Kingdom of Essex at the beginning of the 7th century, but was ceded to Mercia in the 9th century (825).

The Middle Saxons were originally pagans, but adopted Christianity around the middle of the 7th century. They spoke their own variant of Old English, but Latin was used in writing.
