= Little Hormead =

Village in Hertfordshire, England

Coordinates: 51.942°N 0.039°E

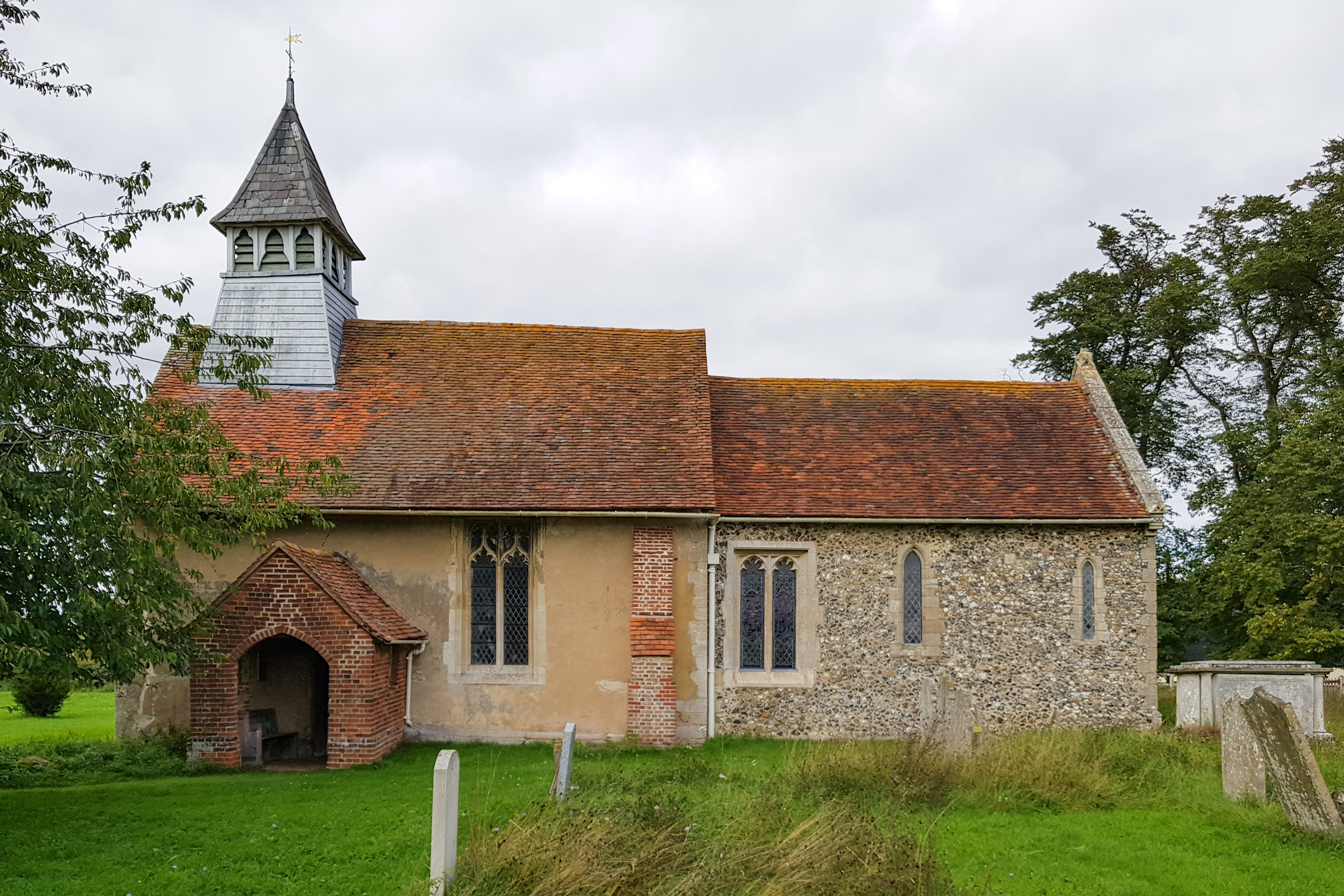
- St Mary's Church

- Location within Hertfordshire
- Civil parish: Hormead
- District: East Hertfordshire
- Shire county: Hertfordshire
- Region: East
- Country: England
- Sovereign state: United Kingdom
- Police: Hertfordshire
- Fire: Hertfordshire
- Ambulance: East of England

Little Hormead is a village in the civil parish of Hormead, in the East Hertfordshire district of Hertfordshire, England. It lies 2 miles (3 km) east of the town of Buntingford.

St Mary's Church dates from the 11th century. It is no longer in use as a church, and is now in the care of the Churches Conservation Trust.

Little Hormead and neighbouring Great Hormead were historically separate parishes. They were merged into a single parish called Hormead in 1937. At the 1931 census (the last before the abolition of the parish), Little Hormead had a population of 149.

== See also ==
- The Hundred Parishes
