= Wyddial =

Village in Hertfordshire, England

Coordinates: 51°57′N 0°00′E

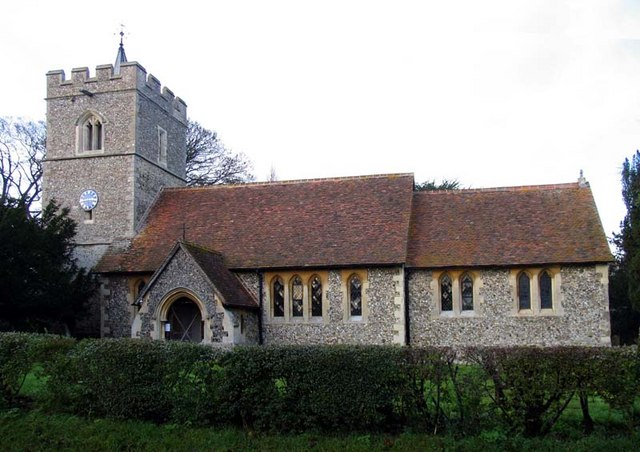
- St Giles' Church, Wyddial

- Location within Hertfordshire
- Population: 149 (Parish, 2021)
- OS grid reference: TL 373 317
- Civil parish: Wyddial
- District: East Hertfordshire
- Shire county: Hertfordshire
- Region: East
- Country: England
- Sovereign state: United Kingdom
- Post town: Buntingford
- Postcode district: SG9
- Police: Hertfordshire
- Fire: Hertfordshire
- Ambulance: East of England
- UK Parliament: North East Hertfordshire

Wyddial is a village and civil parish in the East Hertfordshire district of Hertfordshire, England. It lies 1.5 miles (2.4 km) north-east of Buntingford, its post town. At the 2021 census, the parish had a population of 149. The village is on the Prime Meridian.

The place name is first attested in the Domesday Book of 1086, where it appears as Widihale, and means 'willow nook'.

The parish church of St Giles dates from the 14th century when the nave was built. The tower and chancel date from the 15th century. In 1859 the nave was restored and the chancel and south porch rebuilt by Baillie & Co.

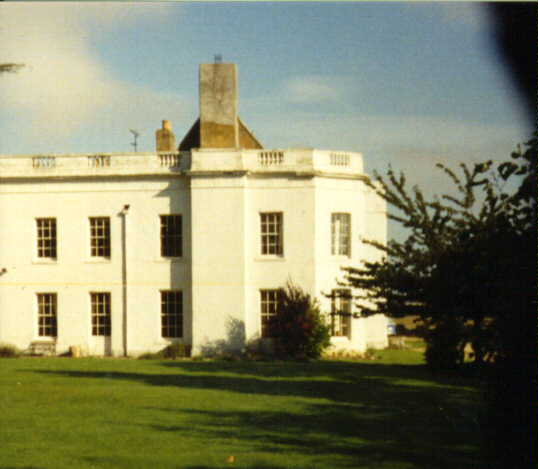
Wyddial Hall from the churchyard.

Wyddial Hall is a Grade II* listed building, which was originally built in the early 16th century. The hall is situated just north of the church and has access via the churchyard. In 1733 it was remodelled after a damaging fire for Francis Goulston. By 1780 it had been acquired by John Thomas Ellis, MP for Lostwithiel, who made alterations, and later changes were made by Charles Heaton-Ellis. Admiral Edward Heaton-Ellis, who fought in the Battle of Jutland in 1916, was born at Wyddial. The Hall was used as accommodation for the Women's Land Army during the 1939-45 war. Sir Charles Heaton Ellis sold Wyddial Bury Farm, Wyddial Park, a number of houses in the village and the surrounding farmland to the Hodge family in the 1930s. On his death in 1946 the Hall was bought by William and Christina Gibson, then in 1964 by Mrs Jennifer Boyd-Carpenter, the ecclesiastical embroiderer, and her husband Michael, a member of the Stock Exchange. The house was sold in 1995 to Michael Hatchard, an international lawyer.

== See also ==
- The Hundred Parishes
