= Throcking =

Village in Hertfordshire, England

Coordinates: 51.953°N 0.056°W

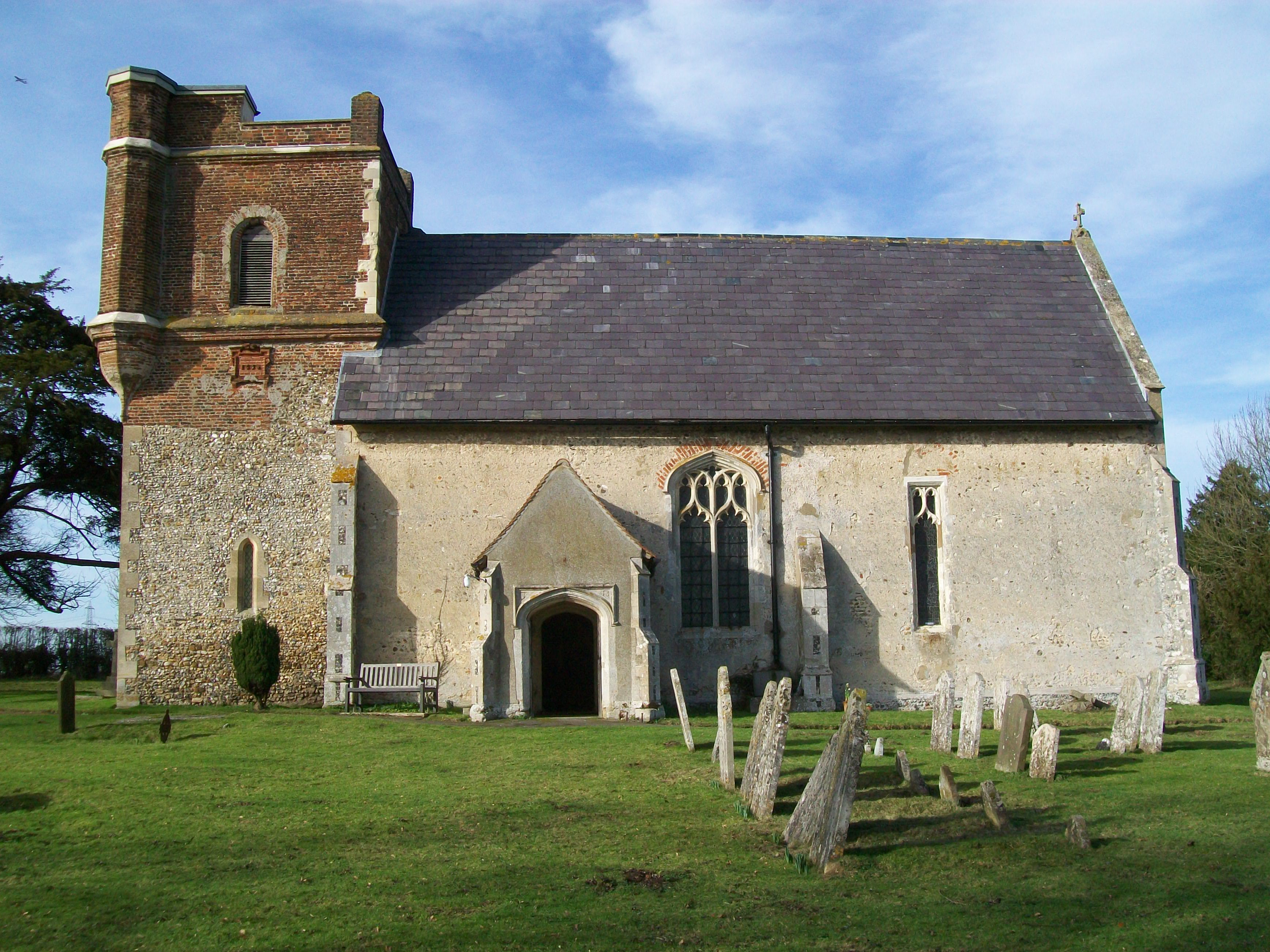
- Holy Trinity Church

- Location within Hertfordshire
- Civil parish: Cottered
- District: East Hertfordshire
- Shire county: Hertfordshire
- Region: East
- Country: England
- Sovereign state: United Kingdom

Throcking is a village in the civil parish of Cottered, in the East Hertfordshire district of Hertfordshire, England. It is approximately 1.5 miles west-northwest of Buntingford and 7 miles east-northeast of Stevenage.

Throcking was recorded in the Domesday Book as Trochinge.

Throcking was historically a parish. The civil parish was abolished in 1955 and its area absorbed into the parish of Cottered. At the 1951 census (the last before the abolition of the parish), Throcking had a population of 139.

== Notable residents ==
- Thomas Soame (1584–1671), English politician
- Sir Leonard Hyde, High Sheriff of Hertfordshire in 1606
- Amy Robsart (1532–1560), first wife of Sir Robert Dudley, 1st Earl of Leicester (1532–1588)
- Leonard Arthur Hawes (1892–1986), British army officer responsible for B.E.F transport to France
