= Great Hormead =

Village in Hertfordshire, England

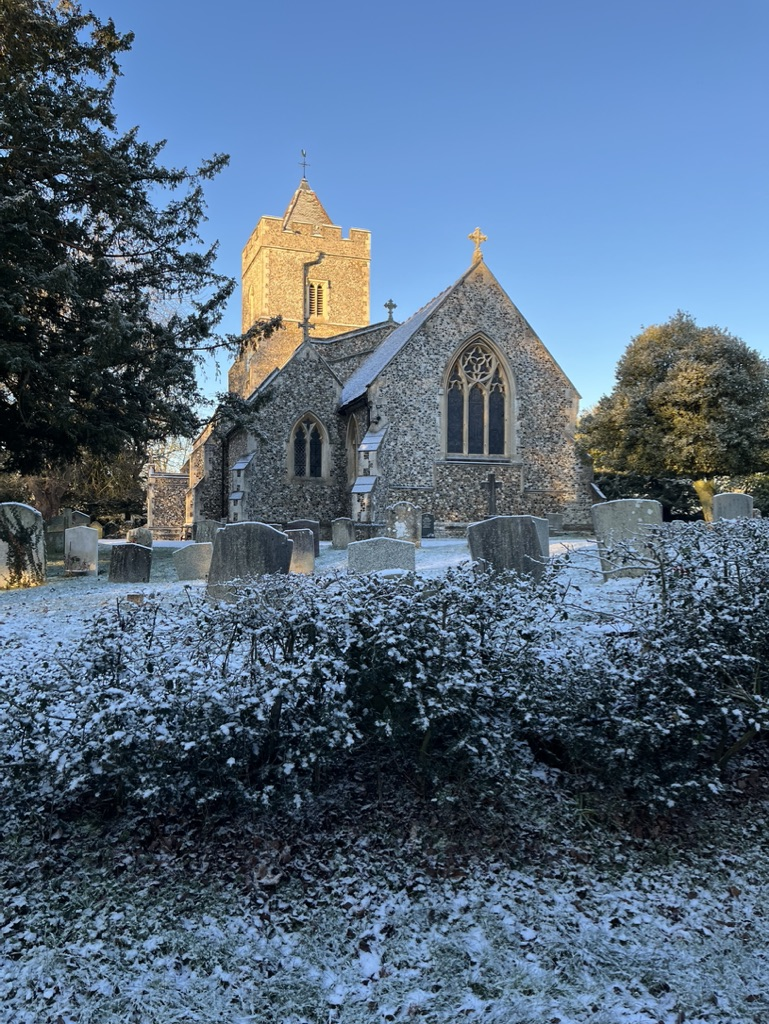
- St Nicholas' Church

- Location within Hertfordshire
- Civil parish: Hormead
- District: East Hertfordshire
- Shire county: Hertfordshire
- Region: East
- Country: England
- Sovereign state: United Kingdom
- Post town: Buntingford
- Postcode district: SG9
- Police: Hertfordshire
- Fire: Hertfordshire
- Ambulance: East of England
- UK Parliament: North East Hertfordshire

Great Hormead is a small village in the civil parish of Hormead, in the East Hertfordshire district of Hertfordshire, England. It stands near the River Quin, on the B1038 road.

Great Hormead and neighbouring Little Hormead were historically separate parishes. They were merged into a single parish called Hormead in 1937. At the 1931 census (the last before the abolition of the parish), Great Hormead had a population of 376.

== See also ==
- The Hundred Parishes
