= Hertfordshire Fire and Rescue Service =

Fire and rescue service in southern England

Operational area
- Country: England
- Address: Hertford, Hertfordshire, SG13 7LD

Agency overview
- Established: 1925
- Employees: 1,000
- Chief Fire Officer: Alex Woodman

Facilities and equipment
- Stations: 29

Website
- www.hertfordshire.gov.uk/services/fire-and-rescue/fire-rescue-and-being-prepared.aspx

Hertfordshire Fire and Rescue Service (HFRS) is the statutory fire and rescue service for the county of Hertfordshire, England. HFRS covers an area of 1,514 square miles (3,920 km^{2}) and a population of 1.19 million.

The service headquarters is located in Hertford whilst the Training and Development Centre (JESA (Joint Emergency Services Academy)) and Fire Control Centre are located in Stevenage. It is administered by a Fire Authority which is an internal part of Hertfordshire County Council. The service is led by Chief Fire Officer Alex Woodman, who was appointed in September 2021.

In December 2005, the service dealt with what is thought to be the largest fire since World War II following an explosion at the Buncefield oil depot near Hemel Hempstead. The incident saw a large scale national response involving many UK fire services.

== Organisation ==
HFRS has 29 fire stations and 40 fire appliances. The stations use a number of crewing models:

- Wholetime fire station: 24/7 crewed. 4 watches working 2 days, 2 nights, 4 rest days
- Wholetime + On-call fire station: As wholetime station but with a second on call fire engine, where firefighters have another primary job and respond via pager from home or work when available
- Day-crewed fire station: Daytime cover on station, night time via pager from home
- Day duty fire station: Daytime cover on station, night time via out duty firefighters arriving from other fire stations.
- On Call Fire Station: Firefighters have another primary job and respond via pager from home or work when available

The protection area includes four large settlements with a population between 50,000 and 100,000: Hemel Hempstead, Stevenage Watford, and the city of St Albans. Almost 89% of residents live in urban areas, comprising 32% of the county; while the remaining population live in the 67% of the county that is rural.

== Performance ==
Every fire and rescue service in England and Wales is periodically subjected to a statutory inspection by His Majesty's Inspectorate of Constabulary and Fire & Rescue Services (HMICFRS). The inspections investigate how well the service performs in each of three areas. On a scale of outstanding, good, requires improvement and inadequate, Hertfordshire Fire and Rescue Service was rated as follows:

HMICFRS Inspection Hertfordshire
Area	Rating 2018–19	Rating 2021–22	Description
Effectiveness	Requires improvement	Good	How effective is the fire and rescue service at keeping people safe and secure from fire and other risks?
Efficiency	Requires improvement	Requires improvement	How efficient is the fire and rescue service at keeping people safe and secure from fire and other risks?
People	Requires improvement	Good	How well does the fire and rescue service look after its people?

== See also ==
- Fire services in the United Kingdom
- List of British firefighters killed in the line of duty
