= List of windmills in Hertfordshire =

Extant windmills in Hertfordshire.
1 Ardeley, 2 Brent Pelham, 3 Colney Heath, 4 Croxley Green, 5 King's Walden, 6 Tring, 7 Weston

A list of all windmills and windmill sites which lie in the Ceremonial county of Hertfordshire.

== Locations ==
=== A ===
Location	Name of mill and grid reference	Type	Maps	First mention or built	Last mention or demise	Photograph
Albury	Approximately; TL 454 247	Post	1676; 1766	1370	1766	
Albury	Approximately; TL 427 232	Post	1720; 1728; 1749; 1766	1720	1766	
Albury	Patmore Heath Mill; TL 445 258	Tower		1862	Demolished April 1921	
Aldbury	Approximately; SP 953 128	Post			Site identified in 1972 by cropmark.	
Aldbury	Approximately; SP 949 113	Post		1364	1364	
Aldenham	Hilfield; Approximately; TQ 152 962			1803	1803	
Aldenham	Munden House approximately TL 137 003			1804	1804	
Anstey				1314	1508	
Anstey	Lincoln Hill Mill; TL 398 322	Post	1675; 1676; 1695; 1700; 1720; 1728; 1749; 1766; 1800; 1822	1675	Demolished 1920	
Anstey	Snow End Mill			1862	1889	
Ashwell				1336	1336	
Ashwell	Fordham's Mill approximately TL 269 393	Post	1800; 1822	1800	1877	
Ashwell	Kitchener's Mill; TL 264 390	Smock	1822	1822	1877	
Ashwell	Slip End Mill; Approximately; TL 287 373	Post	1800; 1822	1800	1833	
Aspenden	Approximately; TL 366 284	Post		1583	1623	
Aspenden	Approximately; TL 366 284	Post	1720; 1728; 1749	1720	1749	
Aston	Approximately; TL 267 223	Post		1307	1314	
Aston	Broadwater; Approximaterly; TL 267 223	Post	1676; 1720; 1728; 1749; 1766	1676	1766	
Aston	Broadwater; TL 275 231	Smock		c. 1828	Demolished June 1878	

=== B ===
Location	Name of mill and grid reference	Type	Maps	First mention or built	Last mention or demise	Photograph
Baldock	Approximately; TL 240 344	Post	1676; 1695; 1700; 1720; 1728; 1749; 1766	1676	1766	
Barkway	Cokenach	Post		1271	1271	
Barkway	Rokey Mill; TL 382 362	Post	1676; 1700; 1720; 1766	1595	1766	
Barkway	Rokey Mill; TL 382 362	Smock	1822; 1898	1818	1898	
Barkway	Newsells Mill; TL 383 364	Post		1699	Demolished 1792	
Barkway	Newsells Mill; TL 384 364	Smock	1800; 1822	1792	Demolished 1873	
Barley				1577	1577	
Bennington		Post		1342	1342	
Bennington	Benington Mill; TL 295 222	Post	1676; 1695; 1700; 1720; 1728	1676	1728	
Berkhamsted				1300	1300	
Berkhamsted	Approximately; TL 000 079	Post	1720; 1728; 1749	1720	1749	
Berkhamsted	Approximately; TL 014 089	Post	1720; 1728	1720	1728	
Berkhamsted	Approximately; TL 014 089	Post	1749	1743	1749	
Bishop's Stortford	Hockerill Mill; Approximately; TL 497 212	Post	1766; 1822	1766	Demolished c. 1823, Windshaft to Bardfield Saling, Essex	
Bishop's Stortford	Hockerill Mill; Approximately; TL 497 212	Tower		c. 1823	1914, gone by 1918.	
Bishop's Stortford	Barrell's Down Mill; Linsell Mill; TL 485 223	Post	1800; 1822	1800	1896, gone by 1906	
Braughing	Approximately; TL 391 251	Tower	1800	1787	Demolished c. 1811	
Brent Pelham	Brent Pelham Mill; TL 433 313	Smock		1826	Windmill World	
Buntingford				1577	1589	
Buntingford	Layston; TL 370 294	Post	1720; 1728; 1749; 1766; 1800; 1822	1720	Burnt down 1 September 1889	
Buntingford	TL 368 287		1822	1822	1905	
Bushey	Bushey Heath Mill; TQ 151 943	Smock		1826	Demolished c. 1910	

=== C ===
Location	Name of mill and grid reference	Type	Maps	First mention or built	Last mention or demise	Photograph
Chesfield		Post		1318	1372	
Chesfield	Chesfield Park	Titt iron wind engine		1896		
Cheshunt	TL 317 036	Post		1843	Demolished c. 1860	
Cheshunt	Goff's Oak Mill; TL 317 036	Tower		c. 1860	Demolished 1953	
Cheshunt	Turner's Hill Mill; TL 363 023		1822	1822	1861	
Chipperfield	TL 037 014	Post		1594	1594	
Chipperfield	TL 037 014	Smock	1822	1822	1881, gone by 1896	
Chipping	Approximately; TL 350 319	Post	1720; 1728	1720	1728	
Clothall	Approximately; TL 264 326	Post		1370	1370	
Codicote	Codicote Heath; Approximately; TL 206 185	Smock		1841	1855, gone by 1881	
Colney Heath	Colney Heath Mill; TL 205 055	Tower		1854	Windmill World	
Cottered		Post		1581	1581	
Cromer				1192	1576	
Cromer	Cromer Mill; TL 304 286	Post	1720; 1728; 1749; 1766; 1800; 1822	1720	Windmill World	
Croxley Green	Croxley Green Mill; TQ 067 953	Tower		c. 1860	Windmill World	

=== E - G ===
Location	Name of mill and grid reference	Type	Maps	First mention or built	Last mention or demise	Photograph
Essendon	Pope's Mill; TL 258 077		1766	c. 1750	1766	
Flamstead	Approximately; TL 074 145	Post	1676	1309	1676	
Flamstead	Approximately; TL 081 155		1800; 1822	1800	1841	
Furneaux Pelham	Approximately; TL 442 284	Post	1676; 1700; 1749; 1766; 1800; 1822	1587	1822	
Furneaux Pelham	Approximately; TL 441 278	Smock	1822	c. 1820	Demolished c. 1880	
Graveley	Jack's Hill Mill; TL 238 298	Smock		1826	Burnt down c. 1884	
Great Amwell	Amwell End Mill; Peatfield Mill; Approximately; TL 355 135		1822	1820	1878, gone by 1881	
Great Hormead	TL 398 303	Post	1675; 1676; 1695; 1700; 1720; 1728; 1749; 1766; 1800; 1822	c. 1576	1928; Windmill World	
Great Hormead	TL 398 303	Smock		1861	1928; Windmill World	
Great Munden				1290	1290	
Great Munden	Munden Mill; TL 364 222	Post	1676; 1695; 1700; 1720; 1728; 1749; 1766; 1800; 1822	1611	1881, gone by 1898	
Great Munden	Approximately; TL 345 250	Post	1720; 1728; 1749	1720	1749	
Great Offley	Offley Mill; TL 133 269	Post	1676	1644	1684	
Great Offley	Offley Mill; TL 133 269	Tower		1851	Demolished 1926; Windmill World	

=== H ===
Location	Name of mill and grid reference	Type	Maps	First mention or built	Last mention or demise	Photograph
Harpenden	Rothamstead; TL 127 124	Post		1654	Demolished 1715	
Hemel Hempstead	Approximately; TL 064 074	Post		19th century	Late 19th century	
Hemel Hempstead	Approximately; TL 052 106	Post	1720; 1728; 1749	1720	1749	
Hertford	Wallfield; TL 324 120	Post	1720; 1728	1715	Moved to Moreton, Essex, 1740	
Hitchin	TL 176 281	Post		c. 1657	Demolished 1676	
Hitchin	TL 176 281	Post	1720; 1728; 1749; 1766; 1800; 1822	1676	Burnt down 1838	
Hitchin	Charlton Mill; TL 176 281	Tower		c. 1838	1894; Windmill World	
Hitchin	Approximately; TL 186 283	Post	1676; 1720	1676	1727, gone by 1750	
Hitchin	Rawlins Mill; TL 189 291	Post	1749; 1766; 1800; 1822	1725	Burnt down 7 November 1875	
Hitchin	Walsworth Mill; TL 195 297	Post	1720; 1728; 1749; 1766; 1800; 1822	1720	1844	
Hitchin	Lucas' Mill; TL 173 293	Post	1822	1820	1846, gone by 1851	
Hitchin	Gosmore Mill; TL 190 275	Post		c. 1829	Demolished c. 1867	

=== K - M ===
Location	Name of mill and grid reference	Type	Maps	First mention or built	Last mention or demise	Photograph
Kelshall		Post		1251	1251	
Kelshall		Post		1599	1679	
King's Walden	Breachwood Green Mill; TL 146 232	Tower		c. 1859	Windmill World	
Lilley		Post		1638	1674	
Little Gaddesden	Approximately; SP 999 135	Post		1284	1305	
Little Hormead	Approximately; TL 398 290			c. 1876	c. 1876	
Little Hadham	TL 434 213	Post		1251	1270	
Little Hadham	Little Hadham Mill; TL 438 229	Smock	1800; 1822	1786	Burnt down 31 July 1981; Windmill World	
Little Wymondley	Approximately; TL 215 820	Sunk Post		Early 13th century	1366	
Little Wymondley	Approximately; TL 215 820	Post	1720; 1728; 1749	1720	1749	
Much Hadham	TL 433 195	Post	1676; 1695; 1700; 1720; 1728; 1749; 1800; 1822	1676	Demolished 1892	
Markyate	TL 069 167	post mill	1720; 1728; 1749; 1766; 1800; 1822	1720	1851	
Meesden				1262	14th century	
Meesden	TL 432 324	Post	1676; 1695; 1700; 1720; 1728; 1749; 1766; 1800	1583	1827	
Much Hadham	TL 422 183	Tower		1892	Demolition began 1925	

=== N - R ===
Location	Name of mill and grid reference	Type	Maps	First mention or built	Last mention or demise	Photograph
Northaw	TL 270 034	Post	1676; 1695; 1720; 1728; 1749; 1800	1676	1808	
Pirton		Post		1592	1700	
Redbourn	Dagnall's Mill; TL 117 099	Post		1708	1738	
Reed				1341	1341	
Reed	Reed Common Mill; TL 356 366	Post	1676; 1695; 1700; 1720; 1728	1661	1728	
Reed	Reed Common Mill; TL 356 366	Post	1766; 1800	1766	1808	
Reed	Mile End Farm Mill; TL 359 386	Tower	1822	1822	Truncated c. 1900; Windmill World	
Ridge	Approximately; TL 205 025	Post	1675; 1720; 1728	1675	Burnt down c. 1743	
Ridge	Approximately; TL 205 025	Post	1749	1749	1785	
Royston	Apprioximately; TL 358 402	Post	1720; 1728; 1766	1720	1766	
Royston	Approximately; TL 359 415	Post	1720; 1728; 1749	1720	1749	
Rushden	Approximately; TL 302 319	Post	1676; 1695; 1700	1619	1700	

=== S ===
Location	Name of mill and grid reference	Type	Maps	First mention or built	Last mention or demise	Photograph
Sacombe	Approximately; TL 328 182	Post	1766	1766	1766	
Sandon	TL 329 345	Sunk Post		1222	1320	
Sandon	Roe Green Mill; Approximately; TL 320 338	Post	1676; 1720; 1766	1676	1785	
Sandon	Green End Mill; TL 325 334	Post	1800; 1822	1800	Burnt down 1 August 1877	
Sandridge	Approximately; TL 183 103	Post		1628	1686	
Sawbridgeworth	High Wych Mill; TL 466 143	Post	1800; 1822	1799	Moved to Little Dunmow, Essex, 1875	
Shephall		Post			Standing before 1541	
South Mimms				1220	1349	
South Mimms				1289	1310	
South Mimms				1628	1668	
St Albans	Bernard Heath Mill; Approximately; TL 153 083	Post	1676	1675	c. 1687	
St Albans	Bernard heath Mill; Approximately; TL 153 083	Post	1720; 1728; 1749	1687	1749, gone by 1753	
St Albans	Cunningham Hill Mill; Approximately; TL 163 067	Post	1675; 1676	1675	1676	
St Albans	Approximately; TL 143 083	Post	1720; 1728; 1749	1720	1749	
St Albans	Approximately; TL 150 050	Post	1720; 1749	1702	1749	
Standon	TL 396 221	Smock		1823	Demolished 1931	
Stanstead Abbotts	Approximately; TL 386 118	Smock		1891	1895	
Stevenage	Approximately; TL 242 258	Post		1274	1274	
Stevenage	Approximately; TL 242 258	Post		1688	Gone by 1699	
Stevenage	Approximately; TL 242 258	Post	1720; 1728; 1749; 1766	1699	1762, gone by 1765	
Stevenage	Corey's Mill; TL 229 266	Post	1675; 1676; 1695; 1700; 1720; 1728; 1766; 1800; 1822	1593	Burnt down 1878	
Stevenage	South End Mill; TL 233 247	Smock		1849	Burnt down c. 1895	

=== T ===
Location	Name of mill and grid reference	Type	Maps	First mention or built	Last mention or demise	Photograph
Therfield				1323	1323	
Therfield	TL 340 176	Post	1720; 1766; 1800; 1822	1720	1822	
Therfield	TL 340 176	Smock		1871	Burnt down 19 January 1881	
Thundridge	Wadesmill; TL 360 170	Post	1800; 1822	1793	1865, gone by 1878	
Tring	New Mill; Approximately; SP 924 125	Post	1766	1766	1797	
Tring	Gamnel Wharf Mill; SP 925 131	Tower	1822	1822	Demolished 1911	
Tring	Goldfield Mill; Grover's Mill; SP 915 117	Tower		c. 1839	Windmill World	

=== W ===
Location	Name of mill and grid reference	Type	Maps	First mention or built	Last mention or demise	Photograph
Walkern				1360	1360	
Walkern	Approximately; TL 285 250	Post	1676; 1695; 1766; 1800	1676	1800	
Walkern	Bassus Green Mill; Pryer's Mill; Prior's Mill; Approximately; TL 299 257		1676; 1700; 1720; 1766; 1800; 1822	1676	1839	
Wallington	Approximately; TL 283 343	Post	1676; 1695; 1700	1660	1700	
Ware				1570	1570	
Welwyn	Approximately; TL 233 172	Post	1676	1676	1676	
Weston				1275	1275	
Weston	Approximately; TL 266 296	Post	1676; 1720; 1728; 1749; 1766; 1800; 1822	1676	1861	
Weston	TL 253 306		1720; 1749	1720	1766	
Weston	Lannock Mill; TL 253 306	Tower		1860	Windmill World	
Whitwell	Approximately; TL 188 207	Post	1766	1766	1766	
Wormley				1338	1391	

== Locations formerly within Hertfordshire ==
- For windmills in Arkley and Totteridge see List of windmills in Greater London.
- Two further mill sites at Markyate now fall within Bedfordshire and are covered under the List of windmills in Bedfordshire.

== Maps ==
- 1675 John Ogilby
- 1676 John Seller
- 1695 John Ogilby
- 1700 Herman Moll
- 1720 John Warburton
- 1728 Clark
- 1749 Thomas Kitchin
- 1766 Dury & Andrews
- 1800 Ordnance Survey
- 1822 Andrew Bryant

== Notes ==
Mills in bold are still standing, known building dates are indicated in bold. Text in italics denotes indicates that the information is not confirmed, but is likely to be the case stated.

== Sources ==
Unless otherwise stated, the source for all entries is Moore, Cyril (1999). Hertfordshire Windmills and Windmillers. Sawbridgeworth: Windsup Publishing. ISBN 0 9533861 0 4.
