= The Pelhams =

The Pelhams may refer to:

- Brent Pelham, Furneux Pelham and Stocking Pelham, villages in Hertfordshire, England
- The Pelhams, New York, an area of Westchester County, New York
