= Reed Windmill =

Reed Windmill may refer to a number of windmills in England.

In Hertfordshire

Any of three windmills at Reed, including Mile End Farm Mill which has been truncated and converted to residential accommodation.

In Kent

Reed Mill, Kingston, a restored windmill tower serving part of a residence.
