= George Cameron (priest) =

Anglican archdeacon

The Venerable George Henry Cameron (28 August 1861; 8 June 1940) was an Anglican archdeacon in Africa during the first half of the 20th century.

== Biography ==
George Henry Cameron was born the son of the Rev. Francis Marten Cameron, MA, who had once been the rector of Bonnington. Cameron was educated at The King's School, Canterbury and Christ's College, Cambridge, graduating BA in 1885, and then MA in 1889. He was ordained deacon in 1885 and priest in 1886. He served curacies at St John, Ladywood; and St George, Edgbaston. In 1890 he became the incumbent of St Stephen, Birmingham; and in 1900, of St Paul, Knowbury.

He was the Anglican chaplain in Baku from 1901 until 1903. In 1903 he was appointed archdeacon of Eshowe, serving at Heidelberg until 1905; and Krugersdorp from 1907. Once settled in South Africa Cameron enrolled at the University of the Cape of Good Hope. In 1912 he became archdeacon of Pretoria; and in 1915 Vicar general of Pretoria. He was archdeacon of Johannesburg from 1916 to 1925; Director of the South African Church Institute from 1925 to 1932; and Provincial Commissary, to the Archbishop of Cape Town from 1925 to 1932.

Returning to England he was vicar of St Mary, Furneux Pelham from 1933 to 1940, and also Rector of St Mary, Stocking Pelham from 1939 to 1940. He also published three books: "John Cameron, Non-Juror", 1923; "Church Finance at Home and Overseas", 1932; and "A History of Furneux Pelham", 1935.
