= Croxley =

Croxley may refer to:

- Croxley Green, a parish in Hertfordshire, England, United Kingdom
  - Croxley tube station, a station on the London Underground in Croxley Green
  - Croxley Rail Link, a proposed rail re-route of the London Underground at Croxley Green
  - Croxley Green railway station, a disused railway station
  - Croxley Green Windmill, a Grade II listed building in Croxley Green
