= Piers Shonks =

English legendary figure

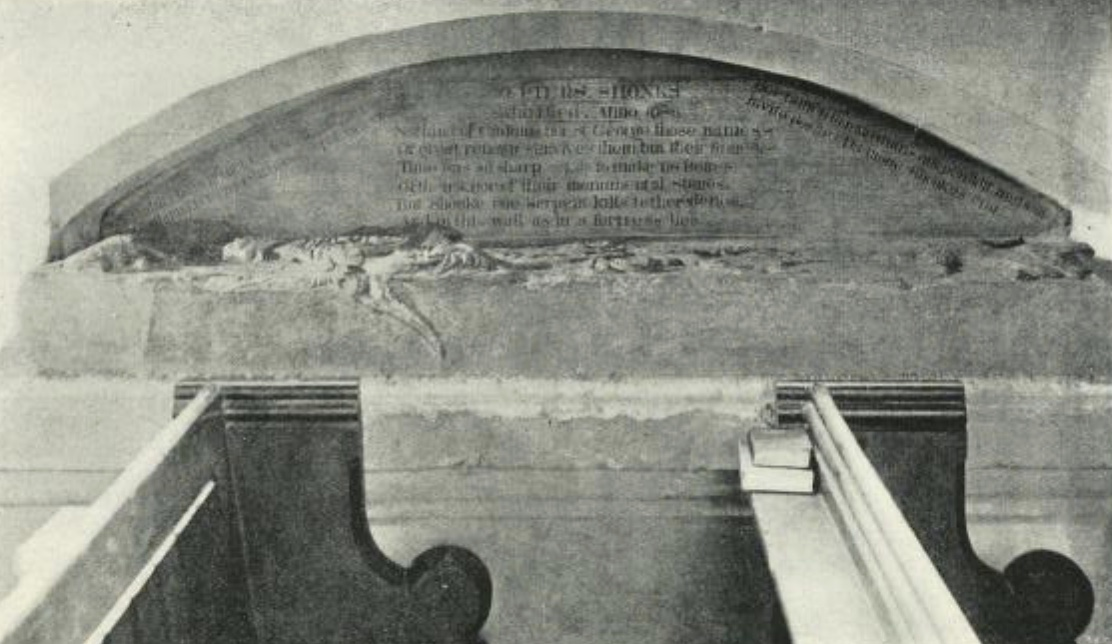
- Piers Shonks's tomb in the church of Brent Pelham

In-universe information
- Gender: Male
- Occupation: Lord of the manor
- Weapon: Spear or lance
- Home: Shonkes

Sir Piers Shonks was a legendary figure in the village of Brent Pelham in Hertfordshire, England, whose tomb is within the north wall of the village's church. According to local legend, Shonks slew a dragon that was causing havoc in the district and later cheated the Devil from claiming his soul by being buried within the walls of the church.

== Legend ==
Legend has it that Sir Piers Shonks was the local lord of the manor; the earthworks of his moated manor house can still be seen to the east of Brent Pelham, known locally as Shonkes. According to the legend, Shonks returned from a holiday to discover that a fearsome dragon had moved into the Brent Pelham area and was wreaking havoc on the district, with all of the local crops burnt and ruined. The dragon was said to have created its lair in a cave under the roots of a great and ancient yew tree that once stood on the boundary of two fields, known as Great Pepsells and Little Pepsells fields. The dragon was said to be the favourite of the Devil himself.

Determined to rid the district of the dragon, Shonks set off to hunt the beast, dressed in full armour with a sword and spear or lance; Shonks was said to be accompanied by an attendant and three favourite hounds, all were said to be so swift it was thought they had wings. After a lengthy hunt Shonks located the dragon in its lair; a ferocious struggle ensued and eventually, whilst the hounds snapped at the dragon's legs, Shonks managed to kill the monster by thrusting his spear down its throat.

After slaying the dragon Shonks was said to be puzzled by the thick smell of sulphur in the air, and turning around he found the Devil standing behind him. The Devil was said to be so enraged by the killing of his creature that he vowed to take his revenge upon Shonks, saying that he would claim Shonks's body and soul upon Shonks's death; and further Shonks could not evade this fate by being buried either inside or outside the Brent Pelham church. Shonks was said to be unmoved by the Devil's threats and retorted that his soul belonged to God and his body would rest wherever he chose. Most versions of the story state Shonks lived for many years after slaying the dragon, although writing in 1700 the local historian Henry Chauncy wrote Shonks was mortally wounded whilst battling with the dragon and died soon afterwards.

In one version of the legend, Shonks requested to be buried in the wall of the church so as to be neither inside nor outside it, and thus frustrate the Devil's vow. A different version says that as Shonks lay dying he asked for a bow and arrow, shooting the arrow into the air he stated that he should be buried wherever the arrow landed. The arrow flew through an open window in the Brent Pelham church and lodged in the church's north wall and so it was decided that upon his death Shonks would be buried within the wall of the church. As he was buried inside the wall of the church, which was neither inside nor outside the church, Shonks's soul was said to be beyond the Devil's grasp and so the Devil was denied his revenge. (Note: Another British legendary figure, Jack o' Kent, is said to have similarly cheated the Devil by being buried inside the walls of the Grosmont church, Gwent. The story of Shonks asking to be buried where his arrow landed is similar to a story about the death of Robin Hood.)

A less commonly told version of the legend is that Piers Shonks was a giant who bested a rival in Barkway.

== Tomb ==
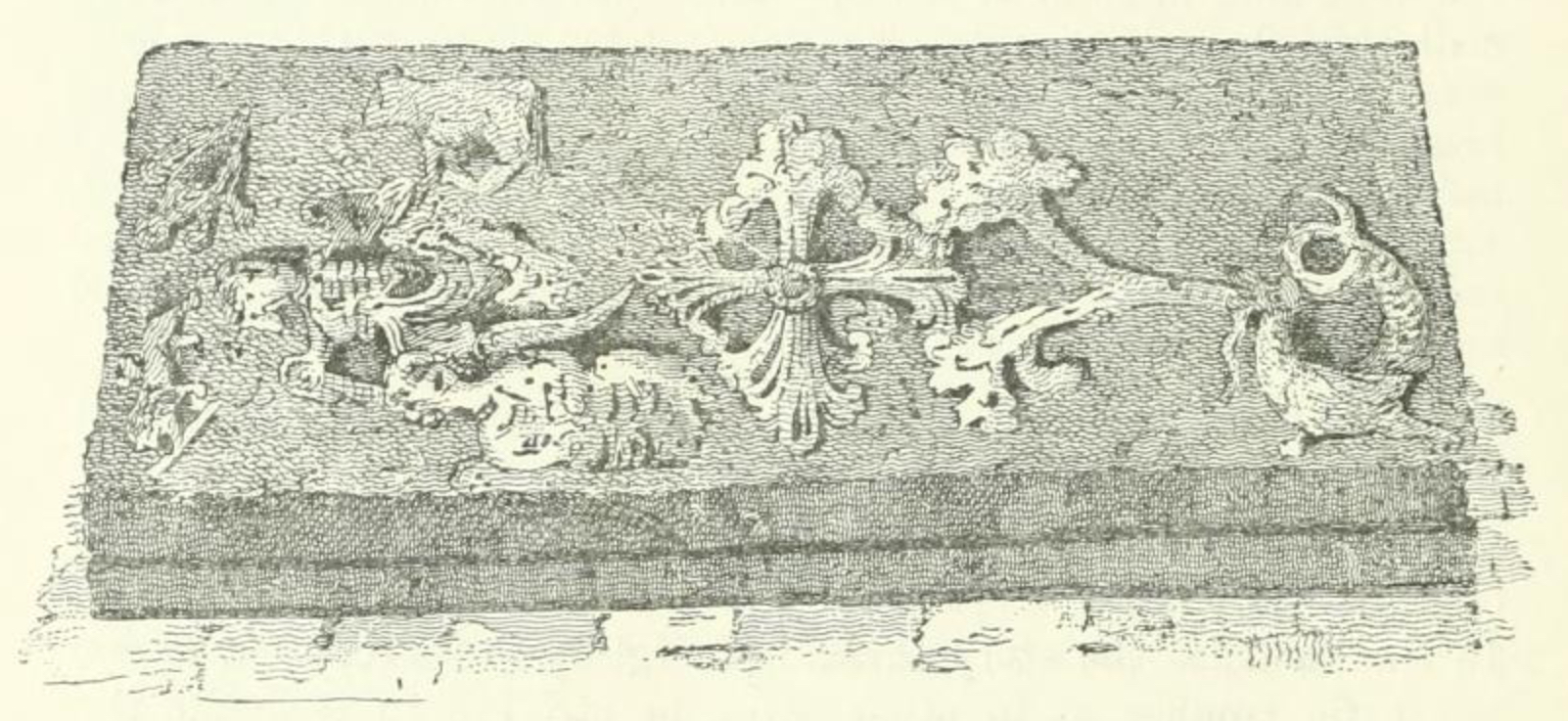
Engraving of the marble cover of Shonks's tomb

Piers Shonks's tomb, which is believed to date from between the 11th and 13th centuries, can be seen inside St Mary's Church in Brent Pelham, it is set in a deep recess within the northern wall of the church's nave.

The tomb has an elaborately carved, heavily restored marble cover that can be dated stylistically to the 13th century. It depicts the Four Evangelists, an angel carrying a soul away to heaven and a large foliated cross the foot of which is thrust through the mouth of a two legged dragon. The tomb itself bears no inscription, but above it is a tablet believed to have been added by the church's vicar in the 17th century, (Note: In 1728 Hertfordshire historian Nathanael Salmon wrote the verses on the tablet were written by Rev Raphael Keen who died in 1614 after being Vicar of Brent Pelham for almost 76 years.) it is inscribed in Latin and English, the English part reads:

O PIERS SHONKS

WHO DIED ANNO 1086
Nothing of Cadmus or St George, those names
Of great renown, survives them but their fames;
Time was so sharp set as to make no Bones
Of theirs, nor their monumental Stones.
But Shonks one serpent kills, t'other defies,

And in this wall, as in a fortress, lies.

== Rise of the legend ==
It is believed the tomb in the Brent Pelham church may have given rise to the legend of Piers Shonks slaying a dragon and cheating the Devil. The tomb's depiction of a dragon with a cross thrust through its mouth could have inspired the story of slaying a dragon and given the detail of how the dragon was dispatched. The inclusion of an angel carrying a soul to heaven may have inspired the story of the Devil claiming Shonks's soul, whilst its unusual location within the walls of the church could have initiated the story of cheating the Devil. The Four Evangelists depicted on the tomb as one winged man and three winged beasts may have given rise to the tradition of a winged attendant and winged hounds.

It is recorded that a family named Shank did possess property in the Brent Pelham parish in the 14th century, including the manor-house Shonkes, and that one member of the family, Peter Shank, was granted another manor-house in the Barkway parish by the Earl of Arundel. It has been speculated that this Peter Shank may have been the Piers Shonks of the legend. It is unknown where the tradition of Shonks's death inscribed on the tomb as the year 1086 came from, potentially from an earlier lost account.

The yew tree that was said to be the dragon's lair was mentioned in a tithe audit compiled between 1895 and 1900, which stated the tree was felled around 1820 and the root hole beneath the tree had been used as a stile on a footpath between Great Pepsells and Little Pepsells fields. It has been speculated from the descriptions of the tree that it may have been as much as 1000 years old at the time it was cut down, and from its location it may have been an Anglo-Saxon boundary tree, or possibly have been used to mark an early cemetery.

== See also ==
- Dragonslayer
