= George Cameron =

George Cameron may refer to:

- George Cameron (songwriter) (1768–1823), Tyneside hairdresser and songwriter
- George Cameron (musician), founding member of the baroque rock vocal group the Left Banke
- George Cameron (cyclist) (1881–1968), American Olympic cyclist
- George Frederick Cameron (1854–1885), Canadian poet
- George H. Cameron (1861–1944), United States Army general
- George Cameron (priest) (1861–1940), English archdeacon of Johannesburg
