= Colney Heath =

Village in Hertfordshire, England

Coordinates: 51.73527°N 0.2564°W

- Location within Hertfordshire
- Area: 4.32 sq mi (11.2 km^{2})
- Population: 5,962 (2011 Census including Smallford and Sleapshyde)
  - Density: 1,380/sq mi (530/km^{2})
- OS grid reference: TL205055
- Civil parish: Colney Heath
- District: St Albans
- Shire county: Hertfordshire
- Region: East
- Country: England
- Sovereign state: United Kingdom
- Post town: ST ALBANS
- Postcode district: AL4
- Dialling code: 01727
- Police: Hertfordshire
- Fire: Hertfordshire
- Ambulance: East of England
- UK Parliament: St Albans

Colney Heath is a large village in Hertfordshire, England. The village became a civil parish in 1947 when the St. Peter Rural parish was split to form Colney Heath and London Colney. There is a converted windmill in the village. The civil parish also includes the settlements of Smallford and Sleapshyde.

== Twinning ==
Colney Heath is twinned with:

- Boissy-sous-Saint-Yon, France; also a small village, and each year either French families visit Colney Heath or English families visit France.

== Education ==
Colney Heath School is the only school in the village. It is a primary school for children aged between three and eleven.

== Sport and leisure ==
Colney Heath has a football club that currently competes in the Spartan South Midlands League Premier Division and plays the home matches at The Recreation Ground. The village has a rugby league club that also plays at The Recreation Ground.

Colney Heath also has a Taekwondo Club which trains at the village hall. The club is led by Master Kim Anderson (VII Degree) who also founded it in 1979.

Colney Heath Local Nature Reserve is located in the village.
