= London Colney =

Village in Hertfordshire, England

Coordinates: 51.726°N 0.300°W

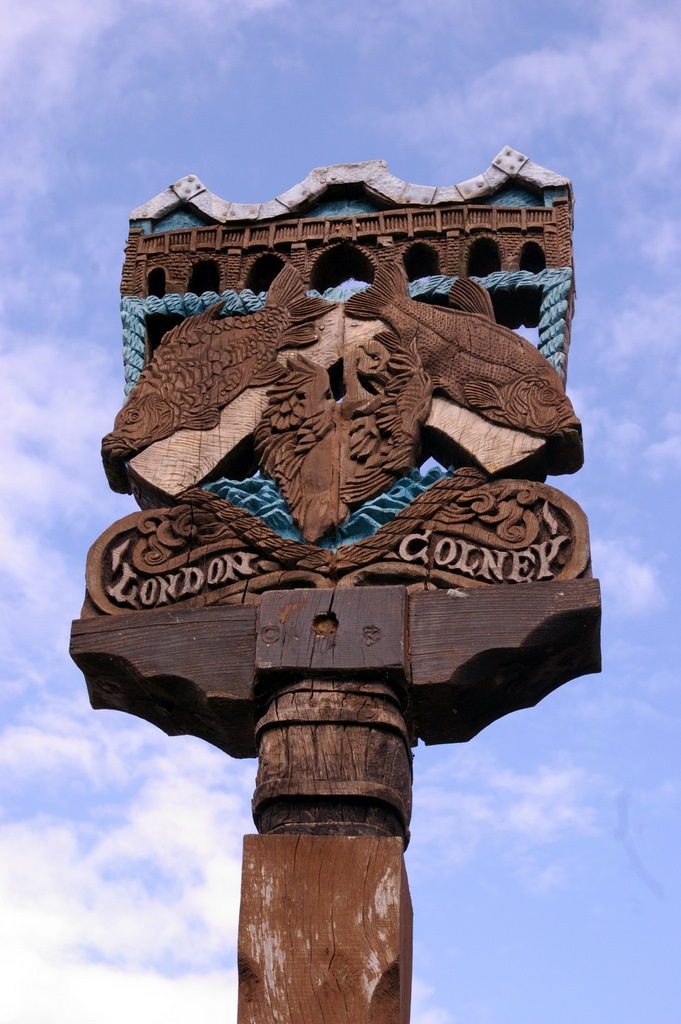
- Village Sign, London Colney

- Location within Hertfordshire
- Area: 513 sq mi (1,330 km^{2})
- Population: 9,804 (2021)
  - Density: 19/sq mi (7.3/km^{2})
- OS grid reference: TL175045
- Civil parish: London Colney
- District: St Albans
- Shire county: Hertfordshire
- Region: East
- Country: England
- Sovereign state: United Kingdom
- Post town: ST ALBANS
- Postcode district: AL2
- Dialling code: 01727
- Police: Hertfordshire
- Fire: Hertfordshire
- Ambulance: East of England
- UK Parliament: St Albans
- Website: London Colney Parish Council

London Colney (/ˈkoʊlni/) is a village and civil parish in Hertfordshire, England. It is located to the north of London, close to Junction 22 of the M25 motorway.

It is around 2.5 miles (4.0 km) south-east of St Albans city centre (and within said city's contiguous built-up area) and part of the City and District of St Albans. At the time of the 2011 census the population of London Colney ward was 9,507, increasing to 9,804 at the 2021 census. It is considered a satellite or dormitory village of St Albans, where some villagers travel to work and shop.

== History ==
Colney was first recorded in the 13th century. It takes its name from the River Colne, with the Old English suffix ēa, meaning "river". The name London Colney, first recorded in 1555, referred to "Colney on the road to London", and distinguished the place from Colney Street.

The village was on the boundary of the 1860s London Coal Tax area; two posts still stand.

London Colney was historically part of the ancient parish of St Albans St Peter. In 1894 it became part of the civil parish of St Peter Rural, which was abolished in 1947 when London Colney became a separate civil parish.

London Colney Primary School was initially due to open on 4 September 1939. It was then closed on the same day, as war was declared. It opened properly a day later.

In the early morning of 12 May 1941, a German spy, Karel Richter, descended by parachute near London Colney. Richter buried his equipment and hid for a couple of days. Driven out by hunger (he had mistakenly buried his food parcel as well), Richter was approached by two lorry drivers who asked him the way to London. Suspicious of Richter's non-committal reply and foreignness, the lorry drivers then approached Constable Alec Scott and mentioned the strange man. Scott found Richter who asked to be taken to a hospital as he was feeling unwell. Scott called his superiors who quickly sent a car to pick up Richter and take him to jail.

== Local features ==
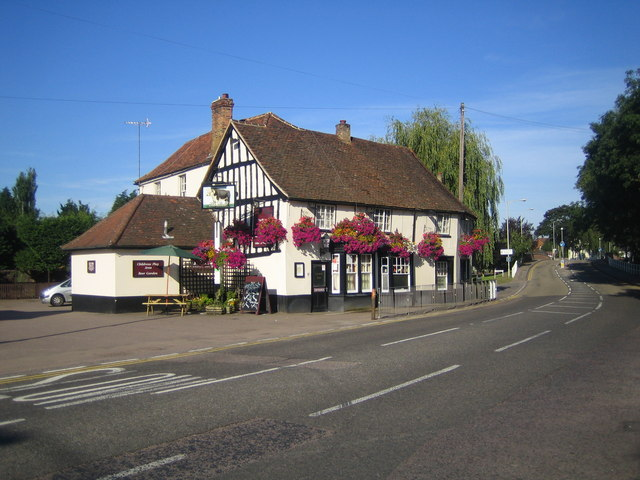
The Bull public house

The village has several estate agents; a motorcycle showroom; a tattooist; several takeaways; hairdressers; supermarkets, one incorporating a post office; a tanning salon; and a turf accountant. There is also a retail park, Colney Fields, which contains a Sainsbury's, Marks & Spencer, Next, Boots, Monsoon and TK Maxx.

There are several doctor's practices and a library.

Associated with the village there are walks, nature reserves and ponds. The Mosquito Aircraft Museum, now known as the de Havilland Aircraft Museum, established in 1959, is located at Salisbury Hall on the south side of the M25 motorway.

London Colney has a great selection of open-water fishing in the River Colne and associated lakes.

== Geography ==
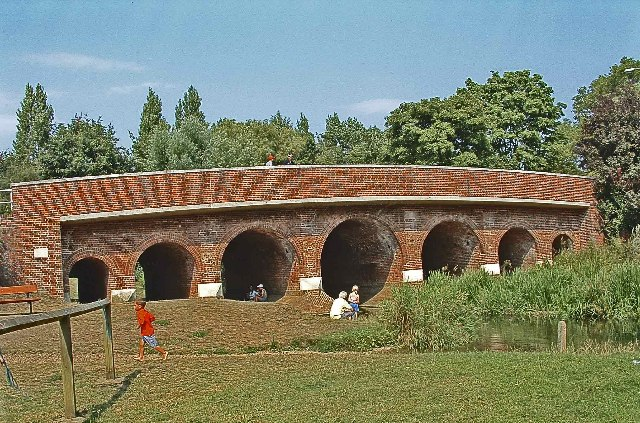
Telford's Bridge, over the River Colne

The High Street crosses the River Colne (a tributary of the Thames joining at Staines-upon-Thames) at the multi-arched brick-built Telford's Bridge (a Grade II listed building, apparently not by Thomas Telford). The original fording point can still be seen on the South side of the bridge, with the Bull and Green Dragon pubs conveniently situated on opposite sides of the ford. Nearby flooded gravel pits form a nature reserve for wild birds. The A6 used to pass through the village. The bypass was built in 1959, to join with the A414 at the north end of the village. The A6 became the A1081 in 1986, with the M25 erasing the original South Mimms Bypass and the dualled section south of London Colney.

== The Parish ==
London Colney Parish Council publishes a quarterly magazine, called The London Colney News. The magazine has been produced continuously since 1984.

== Sport and leisure ==
Arsenal F.C. has its training ground near Bell Lane, London Colney. Watford F.C. also train in London Colney on Arsenal F.C.'s old training ground, University College London Union's (UCLU) Sports Grounds, which is situated between the Arsenal Training Centre and the de Havilland Aircraft Heritage Centre.

London Colney has a non-League football team, London Colney F.C., who play at Cotlandswick Playing Fields.

== Transport ==
The 84 runs through London Colney towards St. Albans to/from Potters Bar operated by Sullivan Buses and Uno bus route 602 also connects the village with St Albans, Hatfield, Watford. Lucketts of Watford route 388 runs to Radlett and Red Rose Travel operate service 357 connecting Borehamwood and Harpenden.

== Local residents ==
The actor Philip Madoc lived in the village for a number of years.

A minor scandal occurred in 2004, when local resident Jake 'the Snake' Roberts was convicted of cruelty to animals after allowing his pet snake to starve to death. The story appeared in the Herts Advertiser newspaper, and noted that the former WWE wrestler lived in Whitehorse Lane.

== Other sources ==
- Hayward, James (2013). Double Agent Snow: The True Story of Arthur Owens, Hitler's Chief Spy in England. London: Simon & Schuster UK Ltd. ISBN 978-0-85720-854-5.
- West, Nigel (1981). MI5 - the True Story of the Most Secret Counterespionage Organization in the World. Briarcliff Manor, N.Y.: Stein and Day. ISBN 0-8128-2859-3.
