= Brent Pelham Windmill =

Grade II listed windmill in Brent Pelham, Hertfordshire, England

Origin
- Mill name: Brent Pelham Mill
- Mill location: TL 433 313
- Coordinates: 51°57′42″N 0°05′11″E
- Operator(s): Private
- Year built: 1826

Information
- Purpose: Corn mill
- Type: Smock
- Storeys: Two-storey smock
- Base storeys: Single-storey base
- Smock sides: Eight sides
- No. of sails: Four sails
- No. of pairs of millstones: Two pairs

Brent Pelham Windmill is a Grade II listed smock mill at Brent Pelham, Hertfordshire, England which is derelict.

== History ==
Brent Pelham Mill was built in 1826 by William Halden, who was at Meesden windmill in 1827. It was working until at least 1890 and was disused by 1898. At some point the mill was stripped of machinery and a water tank was built on the smock tower. The mill survives in this form today, clad in corrugated iron.

== Description ==
Brent Pelham Mill is a two-storey smock mill on a single-storey brick base. It had four sails and drove two pairs of millstones. The weatherboarding is vertical, and survives under the corrugated iron.

== Millers ==
- Peter Harris 1839-54
- Thomas Miles 1855-63
- Walter Watson 1863-90

Reference for above:-
