= St Peter Rural =

Former civil parish in Hertfordshire, England

Coordinates: 51.747°N 0.287°W

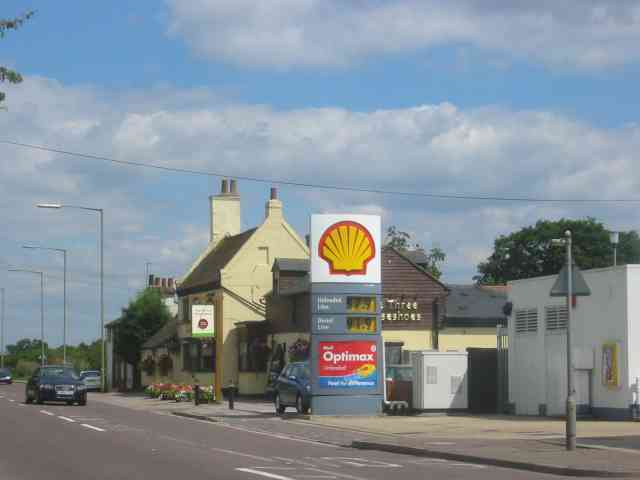
- Three Horseshoes and the Garage at Smallford
- Area
  - 1901: 6,239 acres
  - 1931: 5,249 acres
- Population
  - 1901: 3,568
  - 1931: 7,908
- Density
  - 1901: 0.57/acre
  - 1931: 1.51/acre
- History
  - Origin: St Peter outside the borough of St Albans
  - Created: 1894
  - Abolished: 1947
  - Succeeded by: Colney Heath; London Colney
- Status: Civil parish
- Government: St Peter Rural Parish Council

St Peter Rural was a civil parish in Hertfordshire, England from 1894 to 1947. The local council was St Peter Rural Parish Council.

It was created under the Local Government Act 1894 from the part of the ancient parish of St Peter which was outside the Municipal Borough of St Albans.

It was gradually reduced in size over the years. In 1913 992 acres were transferred to St Albans. In 1935 a further 436 acres were transferred as part of a county review order and 923 acres went to Bishops Hatfield. As part of the review 186 acres were gained from North Mimms, 67 acres from Ridge and 325 acres from Shenley.

The population in 1901 was 3,568 and in 1931 it was 7,908.

It was abolished in 1947, being split between the new parishes of Colney Heath and London Colney.
