= Reed, Hertfordshire =

Village in Hertfordshire, England

Coordinates: 52.0066°N 0.0143°W

Reed
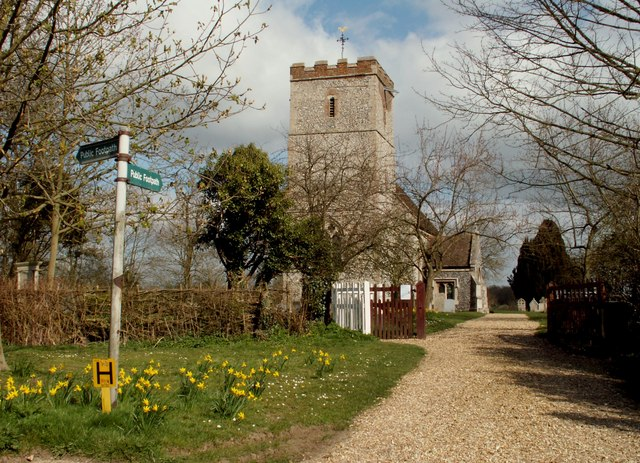
- St. Mary's church, Reed

- Location within Hertfordshire
- Population: 343 (Parish, 2021)
- OS grid reference: TL364360
- District: North Hertfordshire
- Shire county: Hertfordshire
- Region: East
- Country: England
- Sovereign state: United Kingdom
- Post town: ROYSTON
- Postcode district: SG8
- Dialling code: 01763
- Police: Hertfordshire
- Fire: Hertfordshire
- Ambulance: East of England
- UK Parliament: North East Hertfordshire

Reed is a village and civil parish in the North Hertfordshire district of Hertfordshire, England. It is situated on a chalk ridge, approximately 3 miles (5 km) south of the market town of Royston. The Prime Meridian passes just to the east of the village, between Reed and Barkway. The modern A10 road (here following the course of the Roman Ermine Street) passes just to the west of the village. The population of the parish was 343 at the 2021 census.

== History ==
There has reportedly been a settlement at Reed for 2,000 years, and the community was mentioned in the Domesday Book of 1086 (as Retth), when it had 50 households. A number of houses in the village have the remnants of ancient moats, and the village includes a number of ancient woods on its outskirts. Reed's parish church of St Mary dates back to Saxon times, with the nave having been built in the mid-11th century.

Much of Reed was designated a conservation area in 1974.

== Facilities ==
Reed has a first school. There is also a village hall, the Saxon parish church of St Mary, and a cricket club.

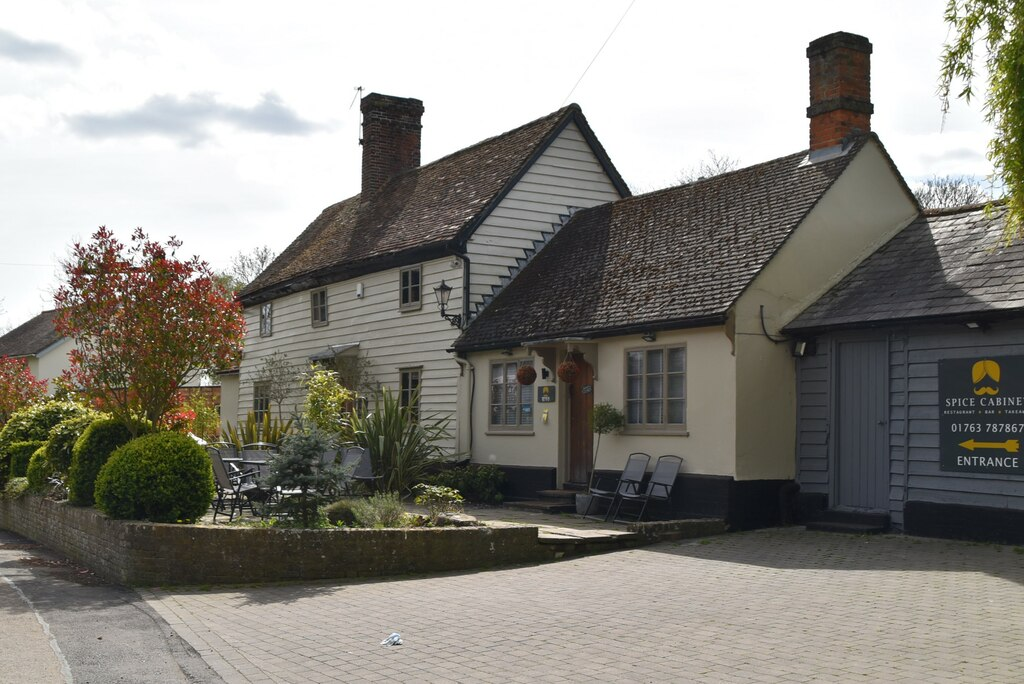
The Cabinet

The village pub, the Cabinet, closed in 2011. As at 2025, a long-running community campaign to have the pub reopened continues.

Mile End Farm Mill, a converted windmill, also stands in the village.

== Governance ==
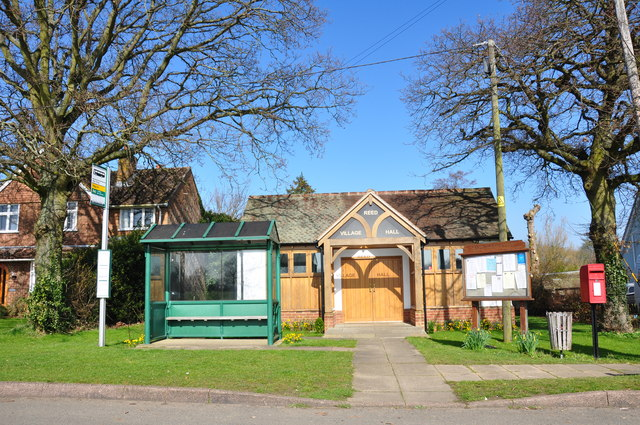
Reed Village Hall

There are three tiers of local government covering Reed, at parish, district and county level: Reed Parish Council, North Hertfordshire District Council, and Hertfordshire County Council. The parish council meets at the village hall on Blacksmith's Lane.

Reed is an ancient parish, and it was part of the hundred of Odsey. Reed was included in the Royston Poor Law Union from 1835. The Local Government Act 1894 created elected parish and district councils. The part of the Royston Poor Law Union within Hertfordshire became Ashwell Rural District; despite the name, the rural district council was always based in Royston. Ashwell Rural District was abolished in 1935, becoming part of Hitchin Rural District, which in turn was abolished in 1974, becoming part of North Hertfordshire.

== Population ==
At the 2021 census, the population of the parish was 343. The population had been 310 in 2011.
