= Colney Heath Local Nature Reserve =

Nature reserve in Hertfordshire, England

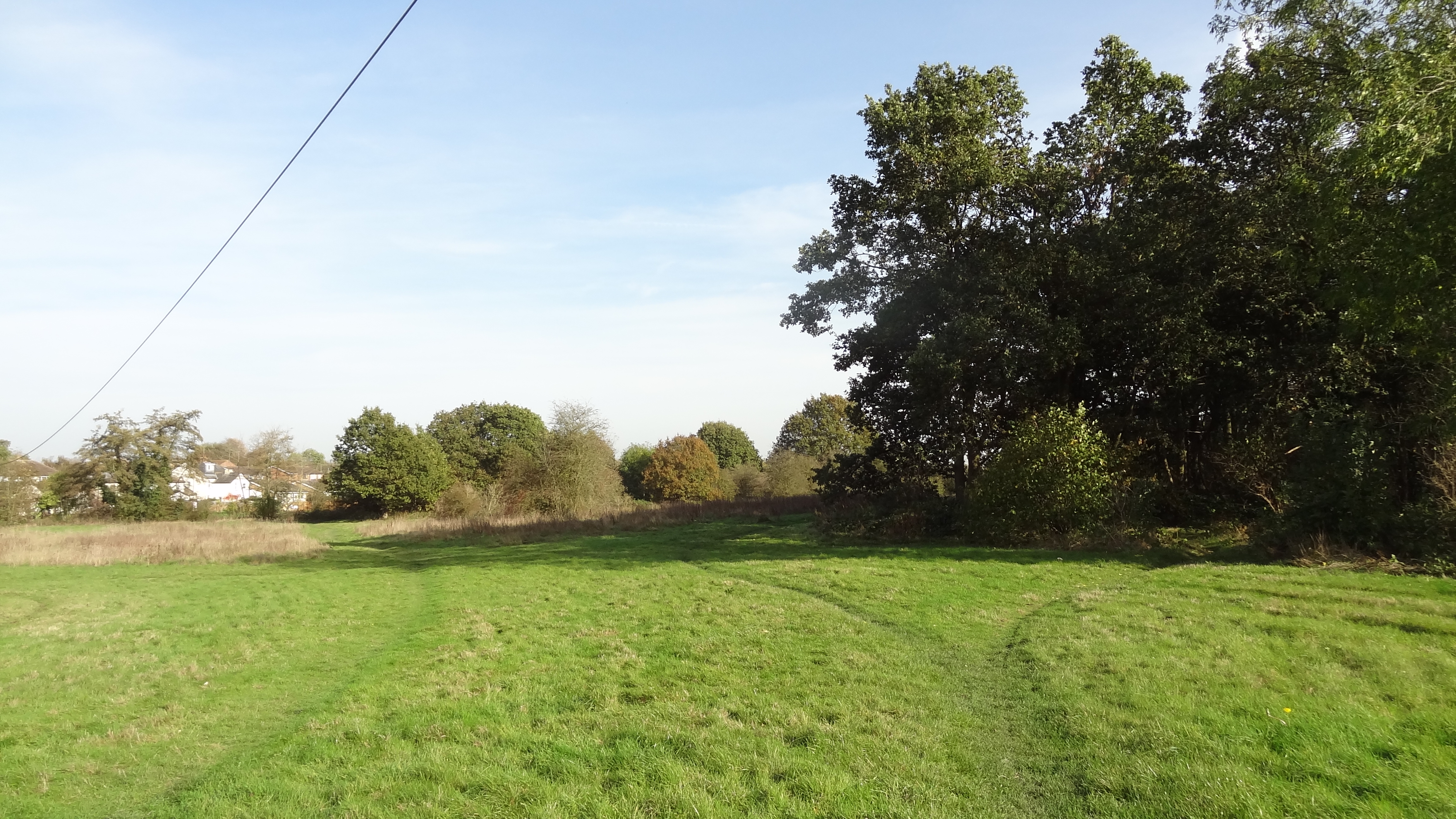
- Colney Heath Local Nature Reserve
- Interactive map of Colney Heath Local Nature Reserve
- Type: Local Nature Reserve
- Location: Colney Heath, Hertfordshire
- Coordinates: 51.7380°N 0.2606°W
- Area: 22.5 hectares (56 acres)

Colney Heath Local Nature Reserve is a 22.5 hectare Local Nature Reserve in Colney Heath in Hertfordshire. It is owned and managed by Colney Heath Parish Council. The site was acquired in the 1950s and 1960s, and it is a Hertfordshire Heritage Site.

The site is acid grassland, which is unusual in Hertfordshire, and the River Colne runs through it. The heath is managed to maintain the grassland and the diversity of plant species along the river. A London coal-tax post is located on the north side of the river in the north-east corner of the site.

There is access from the High Street and Church Lane.
