= King's Walden =

Civil parish in Hertfordshire, England

Coordinates: 51.885100°N 0.327719°W

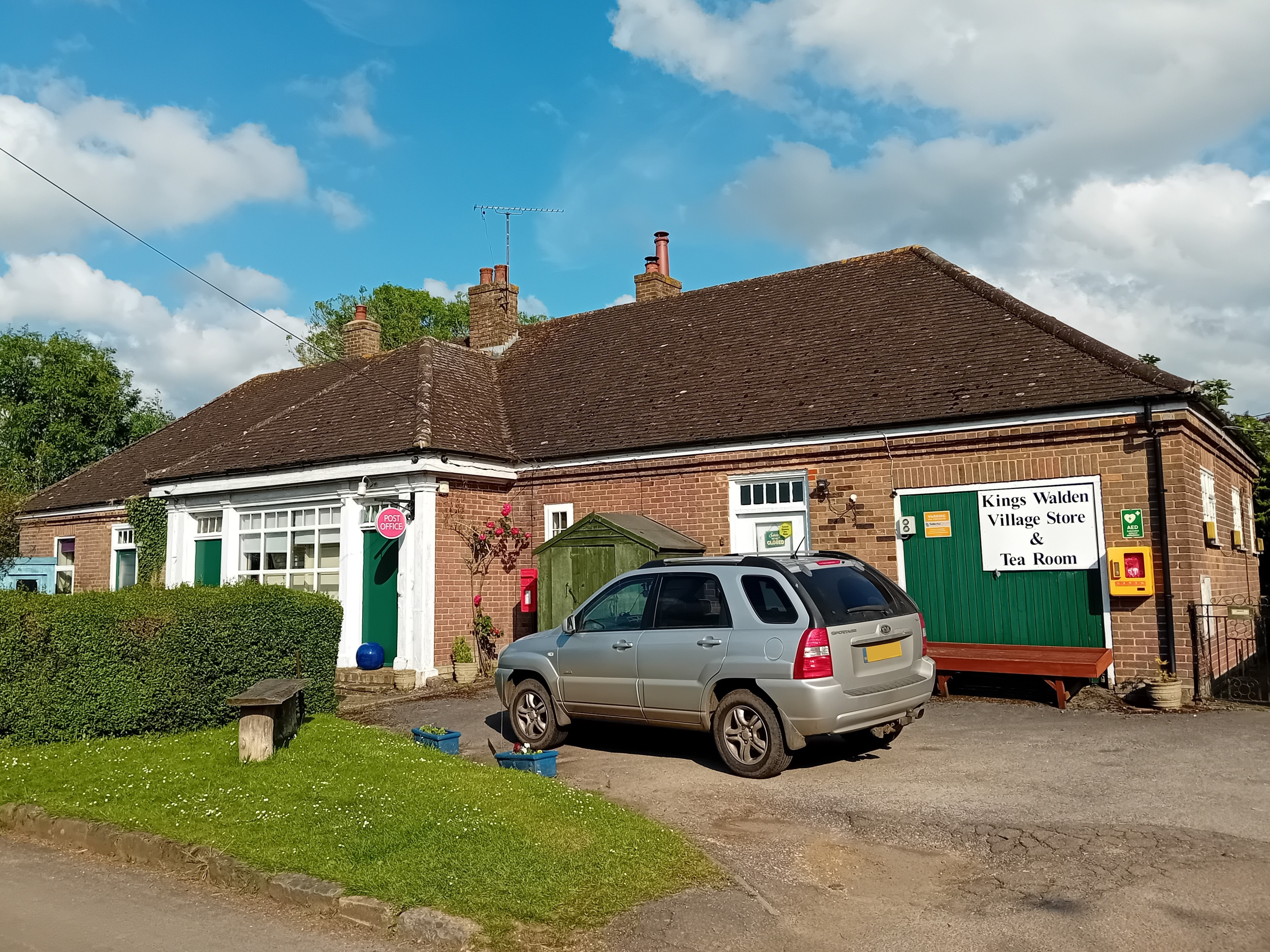
- Village Store, Plough Lane, King's Walden

- Location within Hertfordshire
- Population: 995 (Parish, 2021)
- OS grid reference: TL151220
- Civil parish: King's Walden
- District: North Hertfordshire
- Shire county: Hertfordshire
- Region: East
- Country: England
- Sovereign state: United Kingdom
- Post town: HITCHIN
- Postcode district: SG4
- Dialling code: 01438
- Police: Hertfordshire
- Fire: Hertfordshire
- Ambulance: East of England
- UK Parliament: Hitchin

King's Walden is a village and civil parish in the North Hertfordshire district, in the county of Hertfordshire, England. The parish contains several settlements, with the largest village being Breachwood Green. King's Walden itself is a non-nucleated settlement, with several small clusters of development, notably around the parish church, at Plough Lane (where the village shop and pub are located), and at Ley Green. In 2021 the parish had a population of 995.

The parish also includes the hamlets of Darleyhall, Lye Hill, Wandon End, Wandon Green and Winch Hill. At the south of the parish there is Lawrence End Park. The parish covers a large rural area lying south-west of the town of Hitchin, which serves as its post town, and also adjoins the north-eastern edge of Luton. The end of the runway at Luton Airport was in the parish until a boundary change in 1989 transferred that area to Luton.

== King's Walden settlement ==
The parish name is derived from the Old English 'walh denu', which means a valley of Britons. The name is used by both King's Walden and the neighbouring parish of St Paul's Walden. Walden was cited in a charter dated AD 888, when King Æthelred of Mercia granted land to a thegn, Wulfgar. At the time, it was close to the border between English Mercia and the Danelaw.

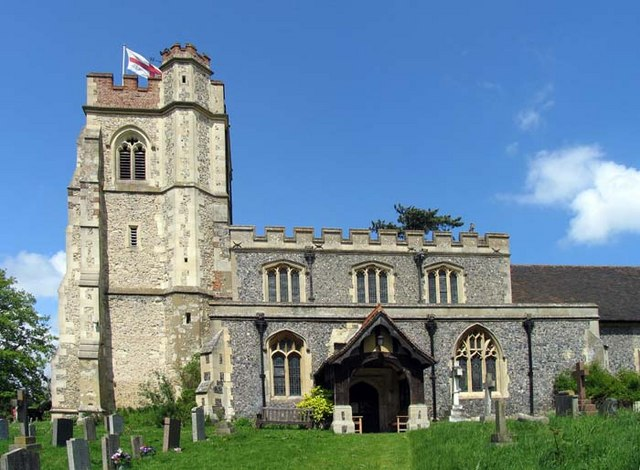
St Mary's Church, King's Walden

In 1086, the community of Waldenei contained 53 households, which was large compared to other Domesday era settlements in the ancient hundred of Hitchin.

The community of King's Walden itself is a loose-knit dispersed settlement in a number of clusters, notably around the parish church and village hall in the south, around the village shop and pub (The Plough) on Plough Lane in the centre, and up to Ley Green in the north, all of which have King's Walden postal addresses.

== Breachwood Green ==
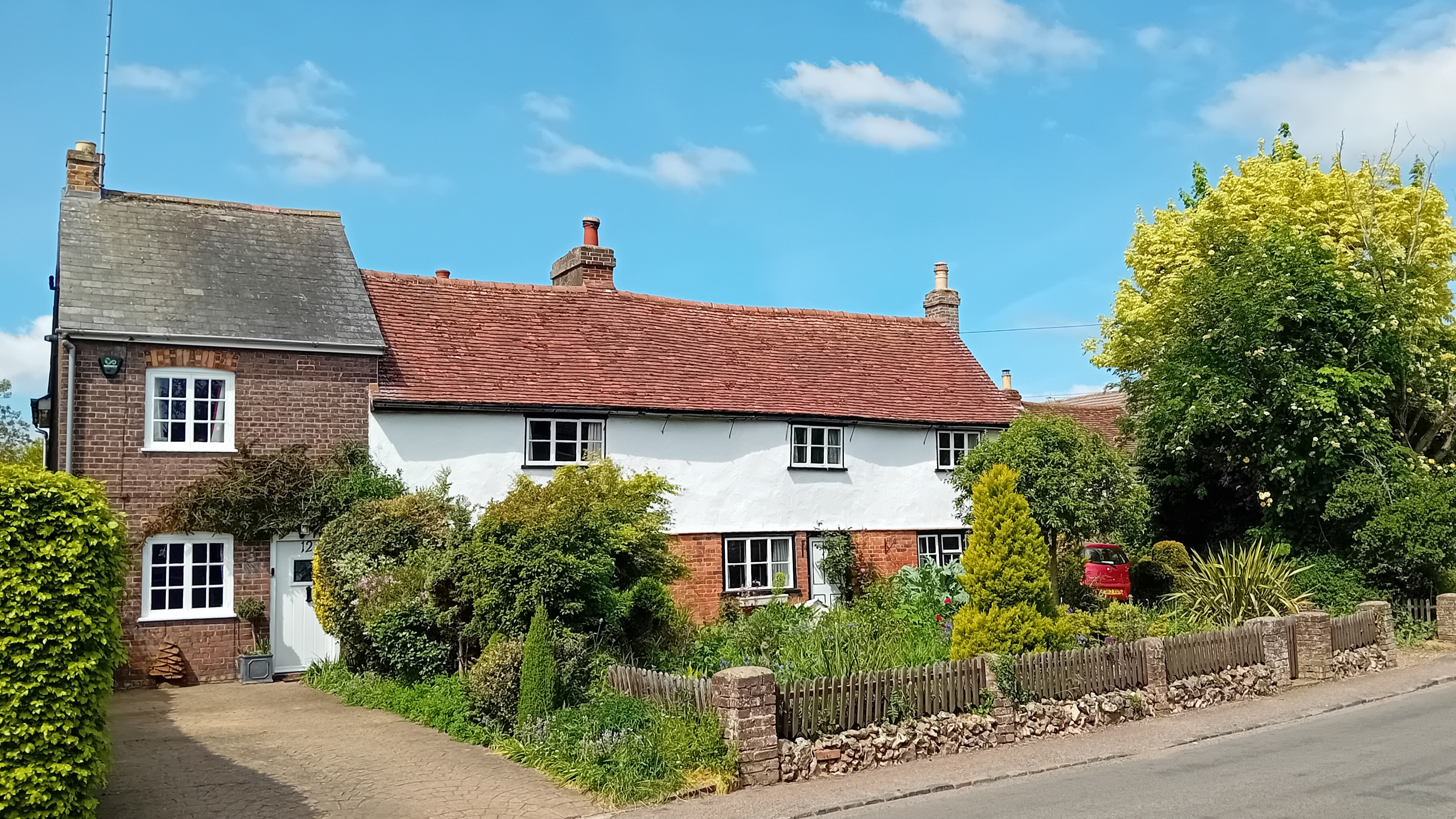
Cottages on Chapel Road, Breachwood Green

Breachwood Green is the largest settlement in the parish of King's Walden. Its built up area had an estimated population of 721 in 2022. It lies 1 mile south-west of King's Walden itself. Breachwood Green has one pub, the Red Lion, which is owned by Greene King. The village has the only school in the parish, Breachwood Green JMI, which was built in 1859.

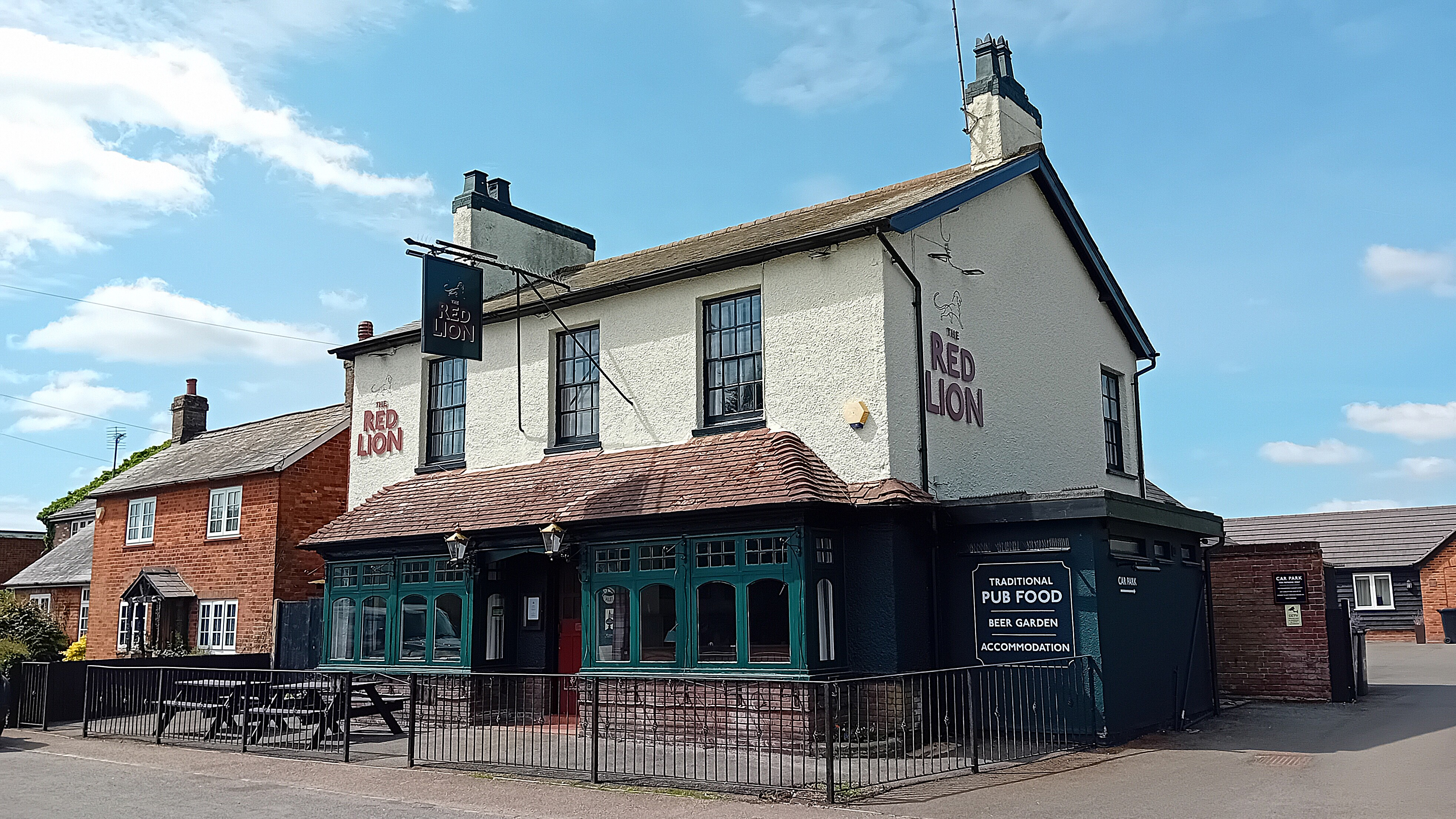
The Red Lion at Breachwood Green

During the 1970s, there was a separate Post Office and Village Stores located in different parts of the village. The Post Office was originally located in Chapel Road next to the Red Lion. This moved a few hundred yards along the road north, near St Mary's Rise. It then moved again in the mid-1970s to the village store on retirement of the village postmistress. The Village Store closed during the 1990s and has become part of a neighbouring car showroom which was formerly the village petrol station.

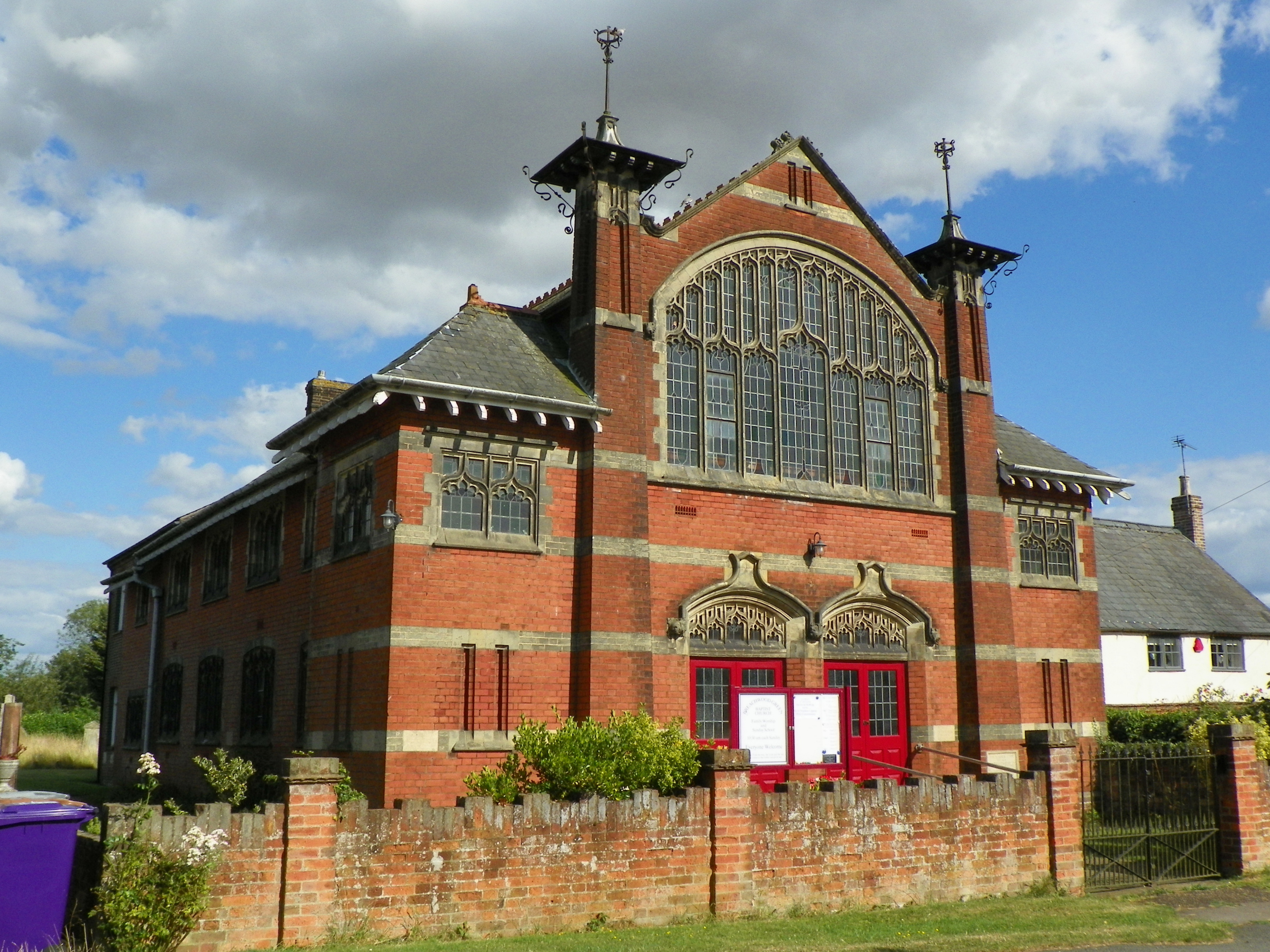
Breachwood Green Baptist Church

The village also has a large Baptist chapel, built in 1904 in a free Arts and Crafts style with Perpendicular Gothic references.

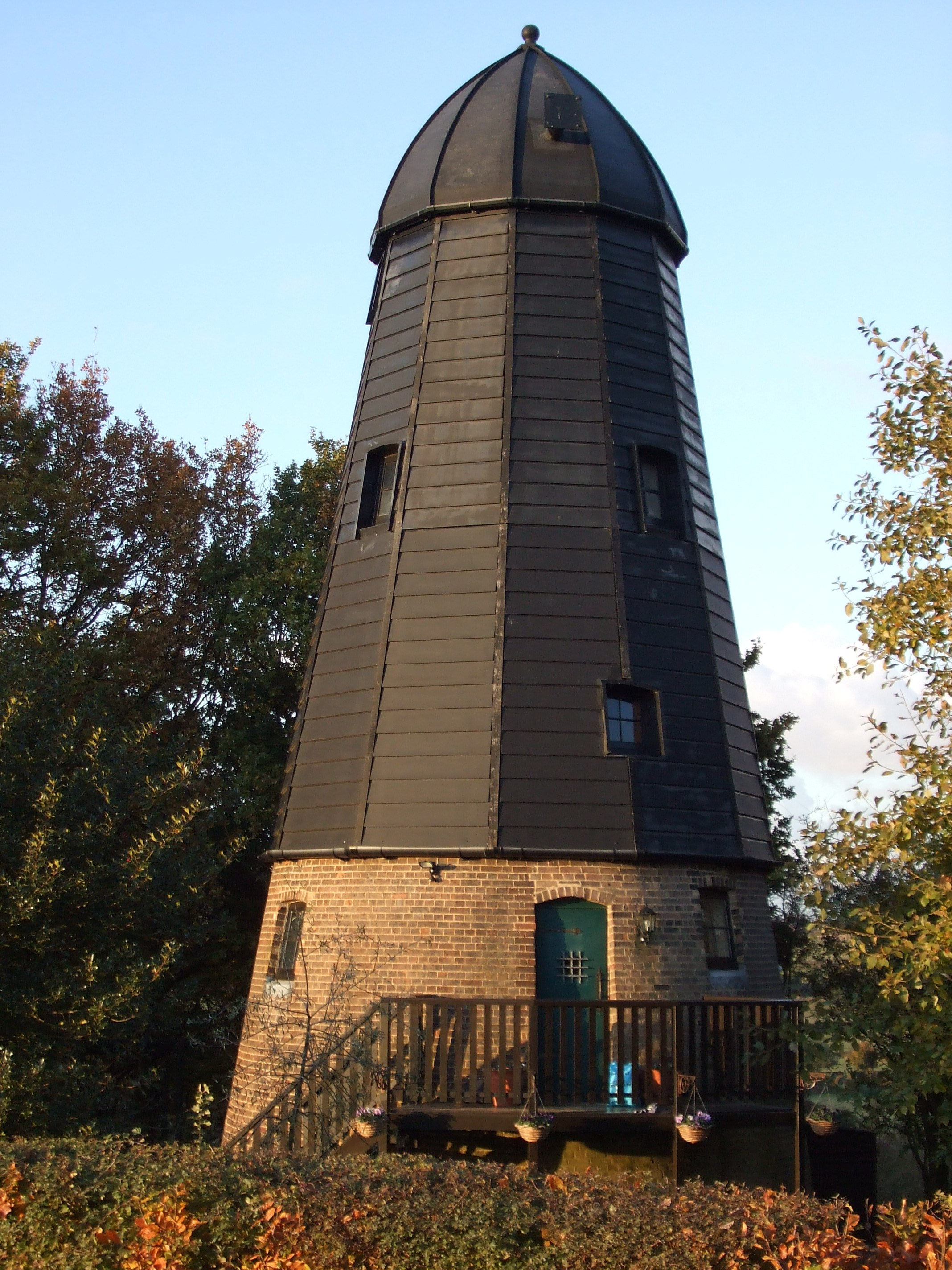
Converted windmill at Breachwood Green

To the north of the village is Breachwood Green Mill, a partially restored windmill (without sails).

== Darleyhall ==
Darleyhall lies ½ mile west of Breachwood Green.

== Lye Hill ==
Lye Hill lies ½ mile south of Breachwood Green.

== Wandon End ==
Wandon End lies 1 mile west of Breachwood Green.

== Wandon Green ==
Wandon Green lies 1 mile south of Breachwood Green and includes Diamond End.

== Winch Hill ==
Winch Hill lies 1 mile south-west of Breachwood Green. It is made up of several houses and a derelict farm adjacent to Eastern perimeter of London Luton Airport; much of the land here is owned by the Crown Estate.

== Governance ==
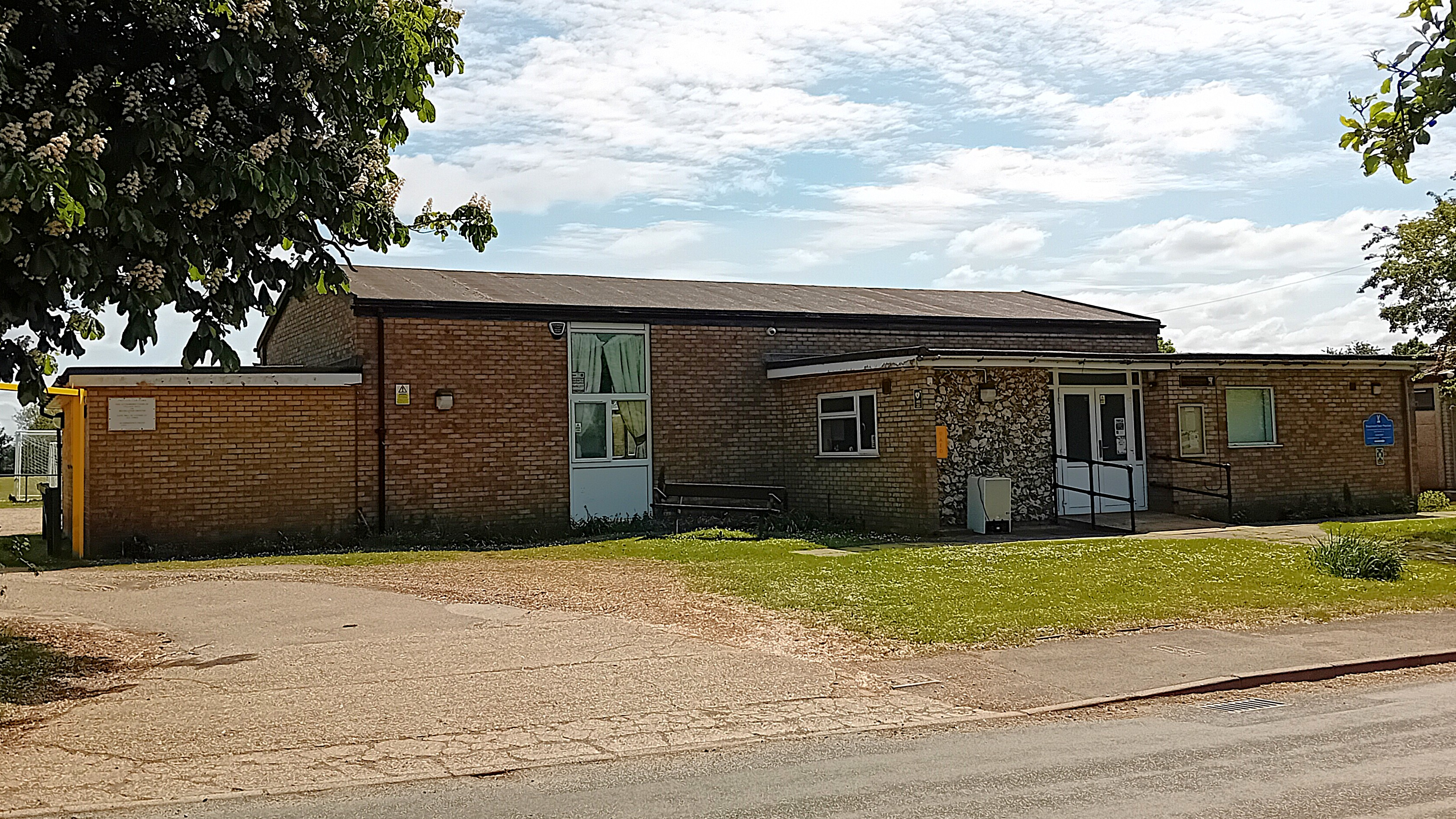
Breachwood Green Village Hall

There are three tiers of local government covering King's Walden, at parish, district, and county level: King's Walden Parish Council, North Hertfordshire District Council, and Hertfordshire County Council. The parish council meets at Breachwood Green Village Hall on Chapel Road.
