= List of windmills in Bedfordshire =

Extant windmills in Bedfordshire.
Sharnbrook, 2 Shefford, 3 Stanbridge, 4 Stevington, 5 Thurleigh, 6 Upper Dean

A list of all windmills and windmill sites which lie in the current ceremonial county of Bedfordshire.

== Locations ==
| Location | Name of mill and grid reference | Type | Maps | First mention or built | Last mention or demise | Photograph |
|---|---|---|---|---|---|---|
| Aspley Guise | | Post | | | Demolished c. 1900 | |
| Barton-in-the-Clay | Barton Mill; TL 0806 2949 | Post | | 1831 | 1851 | |
| Bedford | Mill Street | | | 1842 | Burnt down February 1844 | |
| Biggleswade | Franklin's Tower; The Steam Mill; TL 189 440 | Tower | | 1860 | Demolished 1966 | |
| Biscot | | Smock | | | | |
| Bolnhurst | | Post | | | | |
| Colmworth | | Post | | | | |
| Cranfield | Cranfield Windmill; SP 960 429 | tower | | | Demolished 1966 | |
| Dunstable | TL 014 218 | Tower | | Late 18th or early 19th century | Windmill World | |
| Dunstable | TL 013 221 | | | | | |
| Dunstable | TL 001 208 | | | | | |
| Flitwick | | | | | Standing 1880s | |
| Flitwick | | Smock | | c. 1850 | Burnt down 9 November 1903 | |
| Great Barford | | Smock | | 1835 | Demolished 1907 | |
| Henlow | | Smock | | 1819 | Demolished 1935 | |
| Houghton Conquest | | Post | | | Demolished 1830s | |
| Houghton Conquest | Houghton Conquest Mill; TL 047 423 | Tower | | 1830s | Windmill World | |
| Houghton Regis | | Smock | | | Replaced by tower mill | |
| Houghton Regis | | Tower | | 18th century | | |
| Hulcote | Hulcote Windmill; SP 949 382 | Tower | | 19th century | Demolished c. 1880, machinery to Spaldwick Mill, Huntingdonshire; Windmill World | |
| Husbourne Crawley | Pug Mill | Vertical axis | | 1820 | Demolished c. 1840 | |
| Keysoe | | Post | | c. 1800 | Blown down 1948 | |
| Leighton Buzzard | | | | 1212 | 1212 | |
| Leighton Buzzard | Flemmon's Mill | Post | | | Moved to Whipsnade 1860 | |
| Leighton Buzzard | Beaudesert Mill | tower | | Early 19th century | Demolished 1890s | |
| Lower Dean | | Post | | 1620 | Collapsed 20 December 1959 | |
| Lower Dean | | Post | 1765 | 1762 | Rebuilt 1834 | |
| Lower Dean | TL 041 698 | Post | | 1834 | Collapsed 1959; Windmill World | |
| Luton | Biscot Windmill | Post | | | Burnt down 1841 | |
| Luton | Biscot Windmill | Smock | | 1842 | Demolished 1938 | |
| Markyate | TL 056 186 | Post | | 1222 | 1222 | |
| Markyate | Caddington Mill; TL 056 186 | Post | | c. 1810 | Blown down c. 1815 | |
| Potton | | Post | | 1840s | 1853 | |
| Potton | TL 213 498 | Tower | | | Demolished 1955; Windmill World | |
| Riseley | | Post | | | Standing 1936 | |
| Riseley | | Smock | | | | |
| Sharnbrook | Sharnbrook Windmill; SP 998 593 | Tower | | | Windmill World | |
| Shefford | Shefford Windmill; TL 149 395 | Tower | | | Windmill World | |
| Stanbridge | Stanbridge Windmill; SP 962 245 | Tower | | 1800 | Windmill World | |
| Stevington | Stevington Windmill; SP 992 528 | Post | | c. 1770 | Windmill World | |
| Sundon | | Post | | | Moved to Toddington 1847 | |
| Thurleigh | Thurleigh Windmill; TL 047 582 | Tower | | 1890 | Windmill World | |
| Toddington | | Post | | | Demolished c. 1845 | |
| Toddington | | Post | | 1847 | Blown down 1880s | |
| Totternhoe | | Post | | | | |
| Totternhoe | Doolittle Windmill; SP 990 202 | Tower | | c. 1820 | Windmill World | |
| Upper Dean | Upper Dean Windmill; TL 041 682 | Tower | | 1856 | Windmill World | |
| Whipsnade | | Post | | 1860 | Demolished 1877 | |
| Woburn | Woburn Windmill; SP 941 329 | Smock | | | Demolished 1805; Windmill World | |
| Yelden | | Post | | | Burnt down October 1877 | |

== Locations formerly within Bedfordshire ==
For windmills in Eaton Socon see List of windmills in Cambridgeshire.

== Sources ==
Unless stated otherwise, the source for all entries is Howes, Hugh (1983). Bedfordshire Mills. Bedford: Bedfordshire County Council. ISBN 0-907041-06-X.

== Maps ==
- 1765 Thomas Jeffrey

== Notes ==
Mills in bold are still standing, known building dates are indicated in bold. Text in italics denotes indicates that the information is not confirmed, but is likely to be the case stated.
