= St Albans St Peter =

Former civil parish in Hertfordshire, England

Coordinates: 51.756°N 0.335°W

St Albans St Peter St Peter
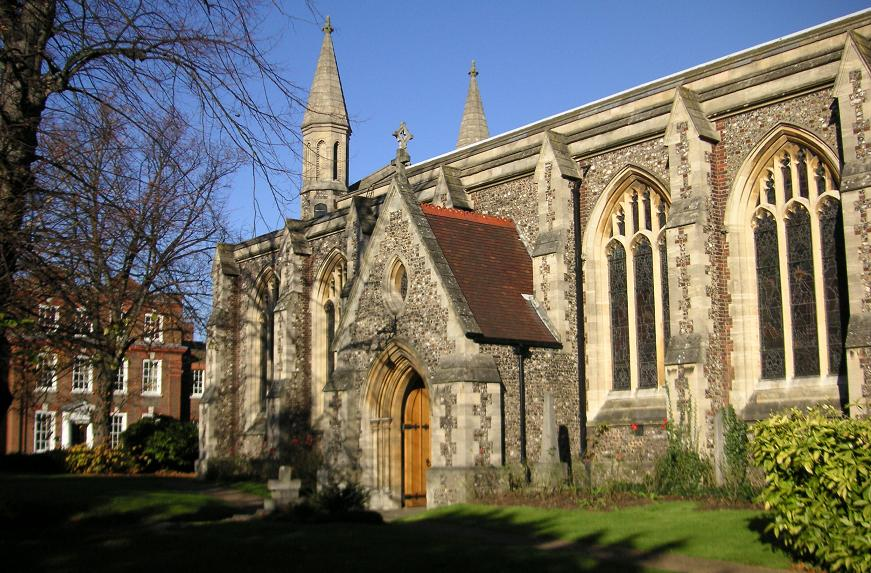
- St Peter's Church
- Area
  - 1891: 6,673 acres
- Population
  - 1891: 8,273
- Density
  - 1891: 1.24/acre
- History
  - Origin: Ancient parish
  - Abolished: 1894
  - Succeeded by: St Peter Rural; St Peter Urban

St Albans St Peter was an ancient parish in Hertfordshire, England that was abolished for civil purposes in 1894. It was also known as St Peter. The parish church was St Peter's Church in St Albans.

Part of the parish was within the ancient borough of St Albans.

The population of the parish as recorded in the decennial census was:

Year	1801	1811	1821	1831	1841	1851	1861	1871	1881	1891
Population	1,674	1,828	2,461	2,973	3,701	3,746	?	5,473	6,779	8,273

In 1894 it was replaced by the parishes of St Peter Rural in St Albans Rural District and St Peter Urban in the Municipal Borough of St Albans.
