= Breachwood Green Mill, King's Walden =

Grade II listed windmill in England

King's Walden Windmill
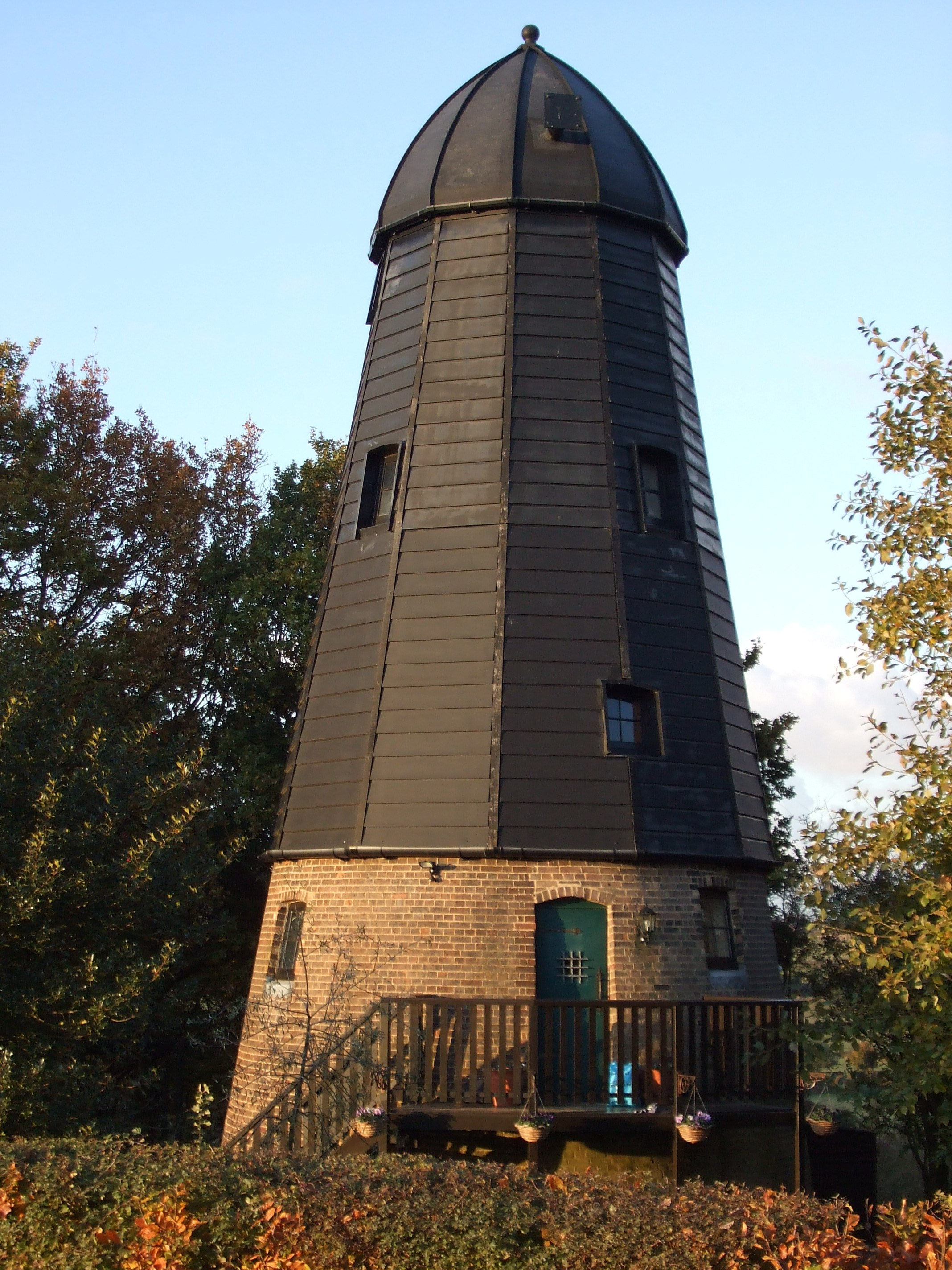
- The converted mill
- Interactive map of King's Walden Windmill

Origin
- Mill name: Breachwood Green Mill
- Mill location: TL 146 232
- Coordinates: 51°53′44″N 0°20′01″W
- Operator: Private
- Year built: c1859

Information
- Purpose: Corn mill
- Type: Tower mill
- Storeys: Five storeys
- No. of sails: Four sails
- Type of sails: Patent sails
- Winding: Fantail
- No. of pairs of millstones: Two pairs

Breachwood Green Mill is a Grade II listed tower mill at King's Walden, Hertfordshire, England which has been converted to residential accommodation.

== History ==
A windmill was recorded at Kings Walden in 1329. Another is mentioned in 1762. The first mention of the mill was in 1861 when William Dellow was the miller. His son William had been born at Kings Walden in 1859. Dellow was succeeded at the mill by his son, who worked the mill until 1900. The mill had lost its sails by 1930, and the cap was a bare frame by 1936. The mill was converted to residential accommodation in 1998. Recent photographs of the mill show that the brick tower has been clad in weatherboarding with the result that the mill now resembles a many-sided smock mill.

== Description ==
Breachwood Green Mill is a five-storey tower mill. The tower is 24 feet (7.32 m) outside diameter at the base with brickwork 2 feet (610 mm) thick. It is 42 feet (12.80 m) high to curb level. The dome shaped cap was winded by a fantail and there were four Patent sails. The great spur wheel was of cast iron and the mill drove two pairs of millstones.

== Millers ==
- William Dellow 1859-
- William Dellow Jr -1900

Reference for above:-
