= Meesden =

Village in Hertfordshire, England

Coordinates: 51°58′N 0°06′E

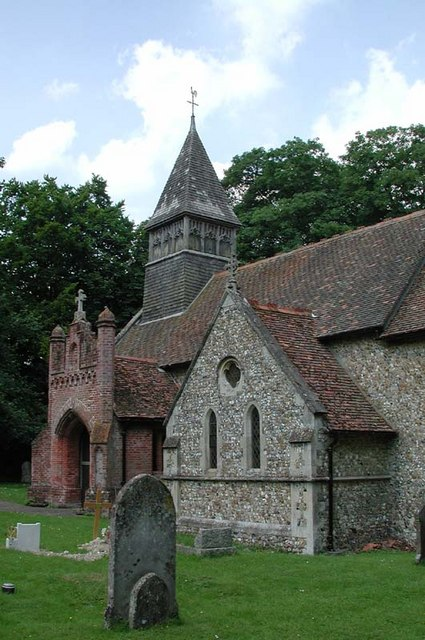
- St Mary's Church

- Location within Hertfordshire
- Population: 120 (Parish, 2021)
- Civil parish: Meesden
- District: East Hertfordshire
- Shire county: Hertfordshire
- Region: East
- Country: England
- Sovereign state: United Kingdom
- Post town: BUNTINGFORD
- Postcode district: SG9
- Police: Hertfordshire
- Fire: Hertfordshire
- Ambulance: East of England

Meesden is a village and civil parish in the East Hertfordshire district of Hertfordshire, England. It lies 4 miles (6 km) north-east of Buntingford, its post town. At the 2021 census the parish had a population of 120.

Meesden shares a grouped parish council with the neighbouring parish of Brent Pelham.

Meesden's Grade II* listed church is dedicated to St Mary.

== See also ==
- The Hundred Parishes
