= RAF Barkway =

Former Royal Air Force station in Hertfordshire, England

RAF Barkway
- Near Royston, Hertfordshire in England

Site information
- Type: Royal Air Force station - Non Flying Military Communications
- Owner: Ministry of Defence
- Operator: Royal Air Force; United States Air Force
- Condition: Intact

Location
- Shown within Hertfordshire RAF Barkway (the United Kingdom)
- Coordinates: 52°00′30″N 000°00′37″E

Site history
- Built: 1941
- In use: 1942-2011

Royal Air Force Barkway or more simply RAF Barkway was one of the smallest Royal Air Force stations in the United Kingdom. It was a communications station and was a small collection of buildings and a large radio mast.

== History ==
It was originally opened as a monitor station on 22 June 1942 for the Gee (navigation) network in the Eastern area.

The site was used by the United States Air Forces in Europe (USAFE). It was part of communications network linking:

- RAF Chicksands
- RAF Mildenhall
- RAF Lakenheath
- RAF Feltwell
- RAF Molesworth (via RAF Chelveston)
- RAF Alconbury
- RAF Croughton

In September 2008, the station was broken into by a BASE jumper who climbed the mast and then jumped off and deployed his parachute.

== Current use ==
The site was sold in early 2011 as surplus to the Ministry of Defence (MOD) requirements.

== See also ==
- List of former Royal Air Force stations
