= Colney Heath Mill =

Converted windmill in Hertfordshire, England

Colney Heath Windmill
- Interactive map of Colney Heath Windmill

Origin
- Mill name: Colney Heath Mill
- Mill location: TL 205 055
- Coordinates: 51°44′8.53″N 0°15′20.38″W
- Operator: Private
- Year built: c. 1854

Information
- Purpose: Corn mill
- Type: Tower mill
- Storeys: Four storeys
- No. of sails: Four sails
- Auxiliary power: Steam engine
- No. of pairs of millstones: Three pairs

Colney Heath Mill is a Grade II listed tower mill at Colney Heath, Hertfordshire, England, which has been converted to residential accommodation.

== History ==
Colney Heath Mill was built in the 1850s. It was working until 1906, latterly by steam engine. The mill was converted to residential accommodation between 1999 and 2004

== Description ==
Colney Heath Mill is a four-storey tower mill It has a domed cap. There were four sails which drove three pairs of millstones.

== Millers ==
- Edward Whitehead 1854–62
- Samuel Fairey 1862–75
- James Fairey 1867–75
- Henry James 1875–1900
- William James 1900–06

Reference for above:-
