= Goldfield Mill, Tring =

Windmill in Tring, Hertfordshire, England

Tring Windmill
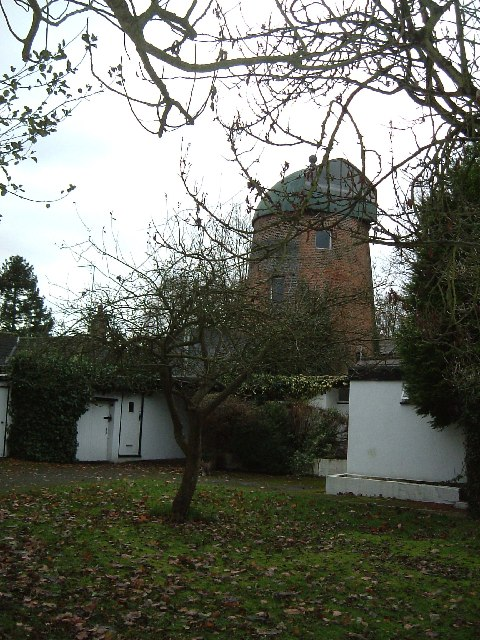
- Goldfield Mill, Tring from Icknield Way
- Interactive map of Tring Windmill

Origin
- Mill name: Goldfield Mill; Grover's Mill
- Mill location: SP 915 117
- Coordinates: 51°47′49″N 0°40′30″W
- Operator: Private
- Year built: c1839

Information
- Purpose: Corn mill
- Type: Tower mill
- Storeys: Four storeys
- No. of sails: Four sails
- Type of sails: Double Patent sails
- Winding: Fantail
- Auxiliary power: Steam engine

Goldfield Mill or Grover's Mill is a Grade II listed tower mill at Tring, Hertfordshire, England which has been converted to residential accommodation.

== History ==
Goldfield Mill was first mentioned in Pigot's Directory of 1839 when James Grover was the miller. The mill remained in the Grover family until 1880. In 1898, a 6 horsepower (4.5 kW) steam engine was installed as auxiliary power. During Thomas Liddington's tenure of the mill, miller Henry Liddington was fined £10 for taking an excessive toll of flour. Goldfield Mill was working by wind until 1908, when miller James Wright left to assume the tenancy of Pitstone Windmill. The mill worked by steam until the 1920s The mill was converted to residential accommodation in 1973.

== Description ==
Goldfield Mill is a four-storey tower mill. It had a pepperpot cap winded by a fantail. There were four Double Patent sails. The upright shaft and cast iron great spur wheel survive.

== Millers ==
- James Grover 1839-61
- William Grover 1861-80
- Thomas Liddington 1880-85
- White & Putnam 1885-95
- James Wright 1895-1908

Reference for above:-
