= Mile End Farm Mill, Reed =

Windmill in Reed, Hertfordshire, United Kingdom

Reed Windmill

Origin
- Mill name: Mile End Farm Mill
- Mill location: TL 359 386
- Coordinates: 52°01′45″N 0°01′05″W
- Operator(s): Private
- Year built: c. 1822

Information
- Purpose: Corn mill
- Type: Tower mill
- Storeys: Four storeys
- No. of sails: Four sails
- Year lost: c. 1900

Mile End Farm Mill is a tower mill at Reed, Hertfordshire, England which has been truncated and converted to residential accommodation.

== History ==
The earliest record of Mile End Farm Mill is its appearance on Andrew Bryant's map of Hertfordshire dated 1822. The mill was working until 1890 and was truncated c. 1900. The tower was incorporated into a house in the 1970s.

== Description ==
Mile End Farm Mill was a four storey tower mill. No details of its cap and sails, internal machinery, millstones or whether it was winded by a fantail or not are known.

== Millers ==
- William Giffen c. 1850-76
- Frederick Giffen 1876-89
- Thomas Clayden 1889-90

Reference for above:-
