= Croxley Green Windmill =

Grade II listed windmill in Croxley Green, Hertfordshire, England

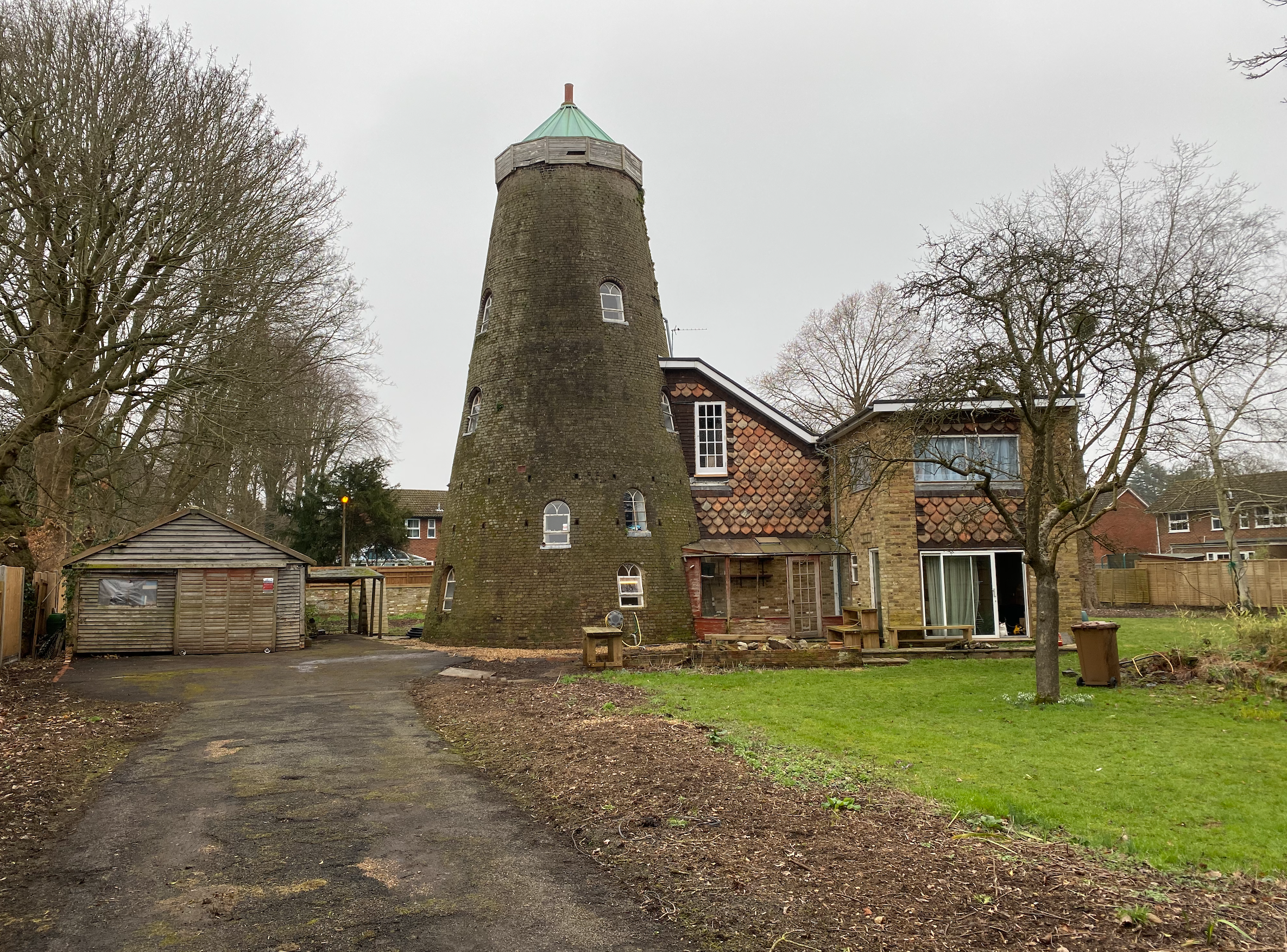

Origin
- Mill name: Croxley Green Mill
- Mill location: TQ 067 953
- Coordinates: 51°38′47″N 0°27′29″W
- Operator(s): Private
- Year built: c1860

Information
- Purpose: Corn mill
- Type: Tower mill
- Storeys: Five storeys
- No. of sails: Four sails
- Type of sails: Patent sails
- Winding: Fantail
- Auxiliary power: Steam engine
- No. of pairs of millstones: Three pairs

Croxley Green Windmill is a Grade II listed tower mill at Croxley Green, Hertfordshire, England which has been converted to residential accommodation.

== History ==
Croxley Green Windmill was built c1860. Isaac Watts was the miller in 1861. He was living at Warden Hill near Luton, Bedfordshire in 1859. The mill was working by wind until the sails were blown off in the 1880s and from 1886 is recorded as having worked by steam engine only. The mill was last used to grind wheat in 1899 and after that it was used as a saw mill and turnery. By the 1930s the mill was used as a chicken house and pigeon loft. During the Second World War it was used as an Air Raid Precautions observation post, with an air raid siren mounted on the tower. The mill was converted to residential accommodation in the 1960s.

== Description ==
Croxley Green Mill is a five-storey tower mill with a stage at second floor level. The tower has an internal diameter of 22 feet (6.71 m) at ground level. It had a boat shaped cap winded by a fantail. The four Patent sails drove three pairs of millstones.

== Millers ==
- Isaac Watts 1861-62
- Philip Howard 1862-65
- J Batchelor 1865-70
- William Caldwell 1870-74
- Ephraim Holloway 1874-95
- Hannah Holloway 1895-1900

Reference for above:-
