= Brent Pelham =

Village in Hertfordshire, England

Coordinates: 51°57′17″N 00°05′16″E

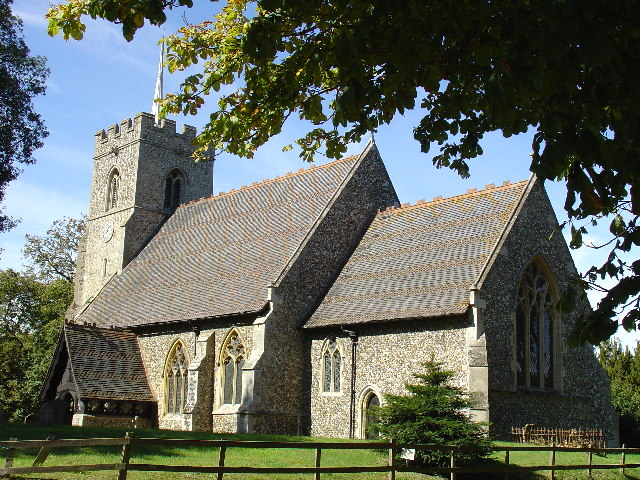
- St Mary the Virgin, Brent Pelham

- Location within Hertfordshire
- Population: 198 (Parish, 2021)
- OS grid reference: TL4330
- Civil parish: Brent Pelham
- District: East Hertfordshire
- Shire county: Hertfordshire
- Region: East
- Country: England
- Sovereign state: United Kingdom
- Post town: BUNTINGFORD
- Postcode district: SG9
- Dialling code: 01279
- Police: Hertfordshire
- Fire: Hertfordshire
- Ambulance: East of England

Brent Pelham is a village and civil parish in the East Hertfordshire district of Hertfordshire, England. It lies 5 miles (8 km) east of Buntingford, its post town. It is one of the three Pelhams, along with Stocking Pelham and Furneux Pelham. At the 2021 census the parish had a population of 198. It shares a grouped parish council with the neighbouring parish of Meesden.

The parish church of St Mary the Virgin dates from the 14th century. It contains a tomb of earlier date, likely the 1200s, on which have been carved the name Piers Shonks and the date, 1086. By tradition, Shonks was a local lord who killed a dragon or, less commonly, a giant. The emblems of the Four Evangelists – angel, eagle, lion, and bull – have been carved around a dragon's mouth. The church is part of a benefice with Anstey, Brent Pelham, Hormead, Meesden and Wyddial.

Near St Mary's church are ancient stocks which could accommodate up to three people. A derelict windmill survives in the village.

There is a Royal Observer Corps observer post just outside the village, but it is now in a state of disrepair. It has an Orlit, which is rare for posts in this area.

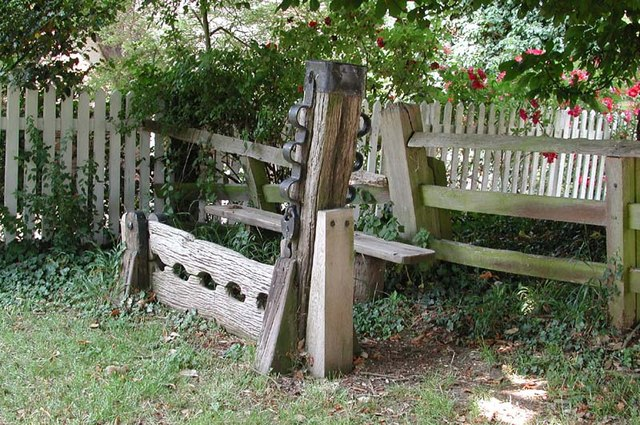
Ancient stocks just outside the churchyard

== See also ==
- The Hundred Parishes
