= Stocking Pelham =

Village in Hertfordshire, England

Coordinates: 51.942°N 0.112°E

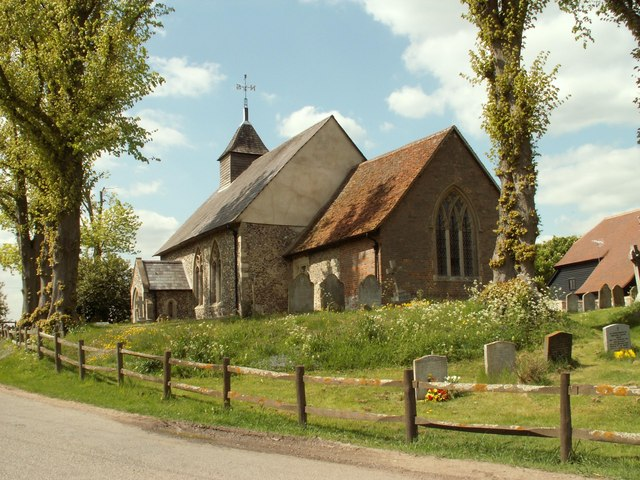
- St Mary's Church, Stocking Pelham

- Location within Hertfordshire
- Population: 196 (Parish, 2021)
- OS grid reference: TL4529
- District: East Hertfordshire
- Shire county: Hertfordshire
- Region: East
- Country: England
- Sovereign state: United Kingdom
- Post town: BUNTINGFORD
- Postcode district: SG9
- Dialling code: 01279
- Police: Hertfordshire
- Fire: Hertfordshire
- Ambulance: East of England

Stocking Pelham is a village and civil parish in the East Hertfordshire district of Hertfordshire, England. It is located on the border with Essex, around 6 miles (10 km) east of Buntingford, its post town. The village is one of the three Pelhams, along with nearby Brent Pelham and Furneux Pelham. To the south-east of the village is a major electrical substation of the National Grid. At the 2021 census, the parish had a population of 196.

== History ==
In the 1870s the location of Stocking Pelham was described as:

"a parish in Bishops-Stortford district, Herts; adjacent to Essex, 5¼ miles N W of Stanstead r. station, and 6 miles E of Buntingford."

The parish church, dedicated to St Mary, has a tiled chancel roof and a nave which date back to around 1360. In either the late 14th or the early 15th century, a narrow aisle was added which required a widened nave. Both the eastern and southern walls of the chancel were re-built in brick in the 19th century.

Muriel McKay was kidnapped in December 1969 and was presumed murdered shortly afterwards at Rooks Farm in Stocking Pelham, although her body has never been found. The village was also the home of Christopher Docherty-Puncheon, who shot Lieutenant Colonel Robert Workman, on his doorstep in nearby Furneux Pelham, Hertfordshire, in an "execution-style" killing in 2004.

== Electrical grid substation ==
The 40 acres substation was built from 1964, by Balfour Beatty at Crabb's Green Farm, south-east of the village. Much haulage traffic came through nearby Manuden. Two 215-ton transformers were delivered, requiring roads to be strengthened, and street lights moved. The substation cost £4m. The transformers were delivered on Wednesday 10 November 1965 at Tilbury docks, having left Manchester on Monday, being built at AEI on Trafford Park Switchgear was supplied by A. Reyrolle & Company. The substation is on the Hertfordshire - Essex border, with the eastern half in Berden in Essex.

== Demography ==
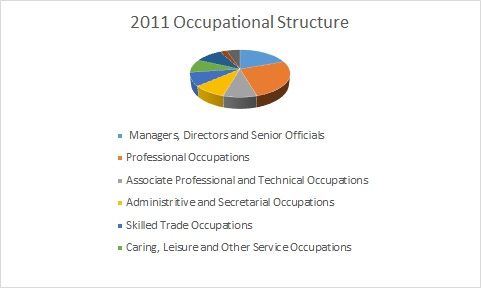
The Occupational Structure of Stocking Pelham according to Neighbourhood Statistics

The parish had a population of 196 in 2021. The population had been 163 in 2001, and was 163 again in 2011.

The 1881 Occupational Structure of Stocking Pelham is illustrated in a pie chart below. The chart shows that 46% of the residents at the time were employed in the agricultural sector, hence there was a clear reliance on agricultural labour. In fact, Stocking Pelham was almost completely dependent on primary sector labour with a small fraction of 5% working in 'Professional Labour'. Although, the 2011 Occupational Structure of Stocking Pelham, also depicted in a pie chart below, in accordance to Neighbourhood Statistics shows that since the 19th century, Stocking Pelham has since broke from its dependence on primary sector labour. In comparison to the 1881 Occupational Structure, citizens are no longer heavily dependent on agricultural labour as a means of income and are now harbouring a more diversely skilled workforce, of which 26% are employed in professional occupations and 19.5% are employed as managers, directors and senior officials. The remaining 54.5% of the workforce are reported to be working within the tertiary and secondary sectors.

Pie chart showing the occupational structure of Stoking Pelham according to the 1881 Census of England and Wales

Historically speaking, much of Stocking Pelham was rather heavily dependent on agriculture for income and in some cases this is still apparent. Considering the nature of the environment this may explain why there are now many retired citizens residing here.

== See also ==
The Hundred Parishes

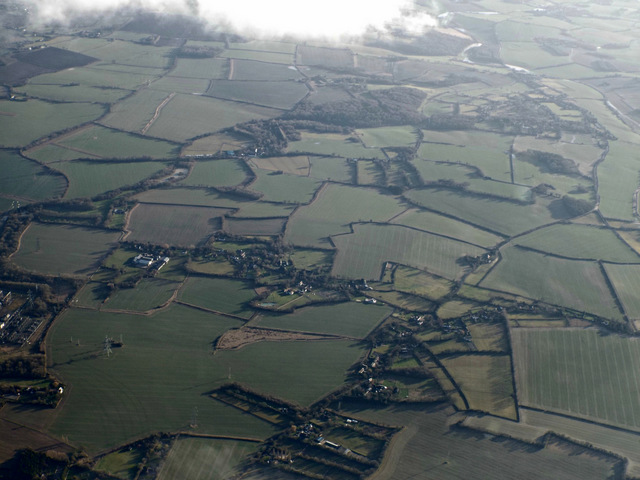
Aerial view of Stocking Pelham
