= Barkway =

Village in Hertfordshire, England

Coordinates: 52.00°N 0.015°E

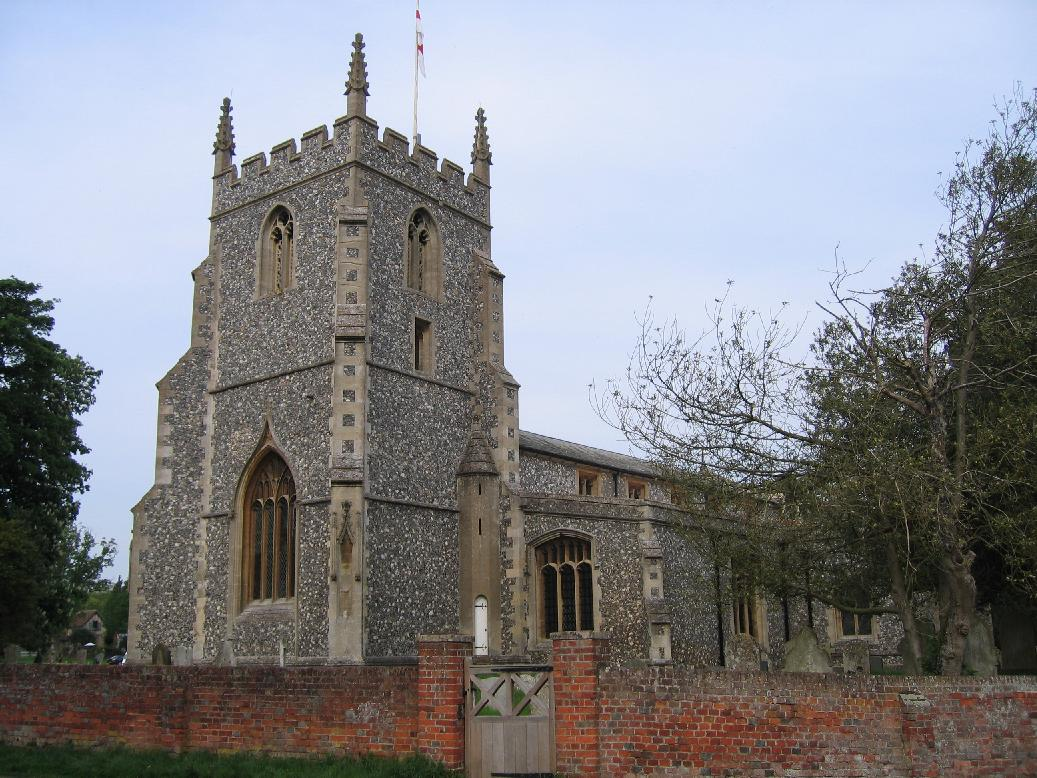
- St. Mary Magdalene Church, Barkway

- Location within Hertfordshire
- Population: 849 (Parish, 2021)
- OS grid reference: TL3831035470
- District: North Hertfordshire
- Shire county: Hertfordshire
- Region: East
- Country: England
- Sovereign state: United Kingdom
- Post town: ROYSTON
- Postcode district: SG8
- Dialling code: 01763
- Police: Hertfordshire
- Fire: Hertfordshire
- Ambulance: East of England
- UK Parliament: North East Hertfordshire

Barkway is a village and civil parish in the North Hertfordshire district of Hertfordshire, England, about five miles south-east of Royston, 35 miles from London and 15 miles from the centre of Cambridge. The Greenwich Prime Meridian passes a mile or so to the west of Barkway.

== History ==
Barkway is reputedly listed in the Domesday Book of 1086 as Birchwig, meaning Birch Way. Barkway has a number of 15th and 16th century properties, some with thatched roofs.

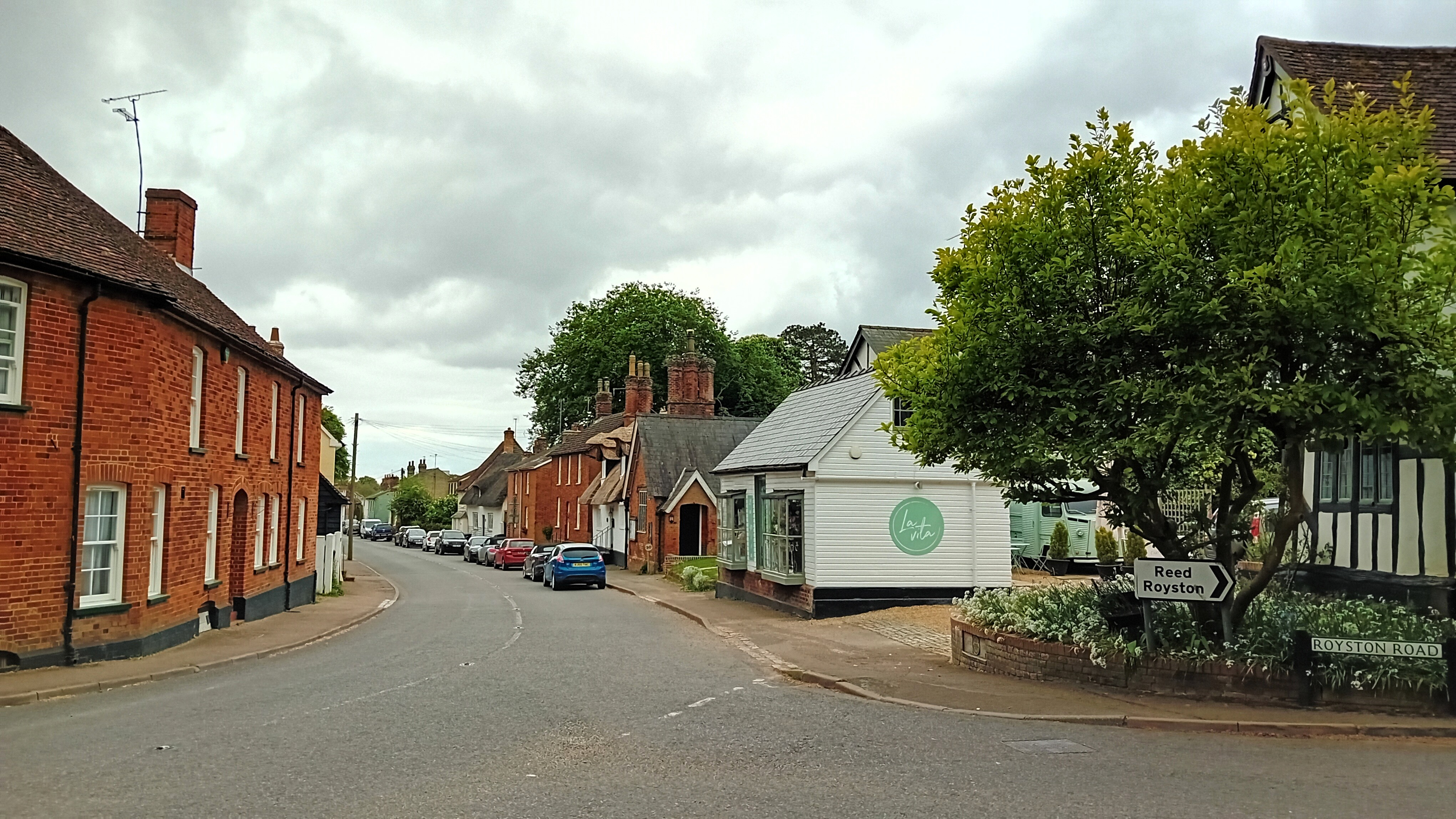
Looking south down High Street

Most properties are on or near the High Street, which is part of the old London to Cambridge coaching route.

Barkway has had a village church for over 1,000 years. The current flint and stone church, which is over 800 years old and dedicated to St Mary Magdalene, has a full peal of 8 bells which are rung every week.

== Geography ==
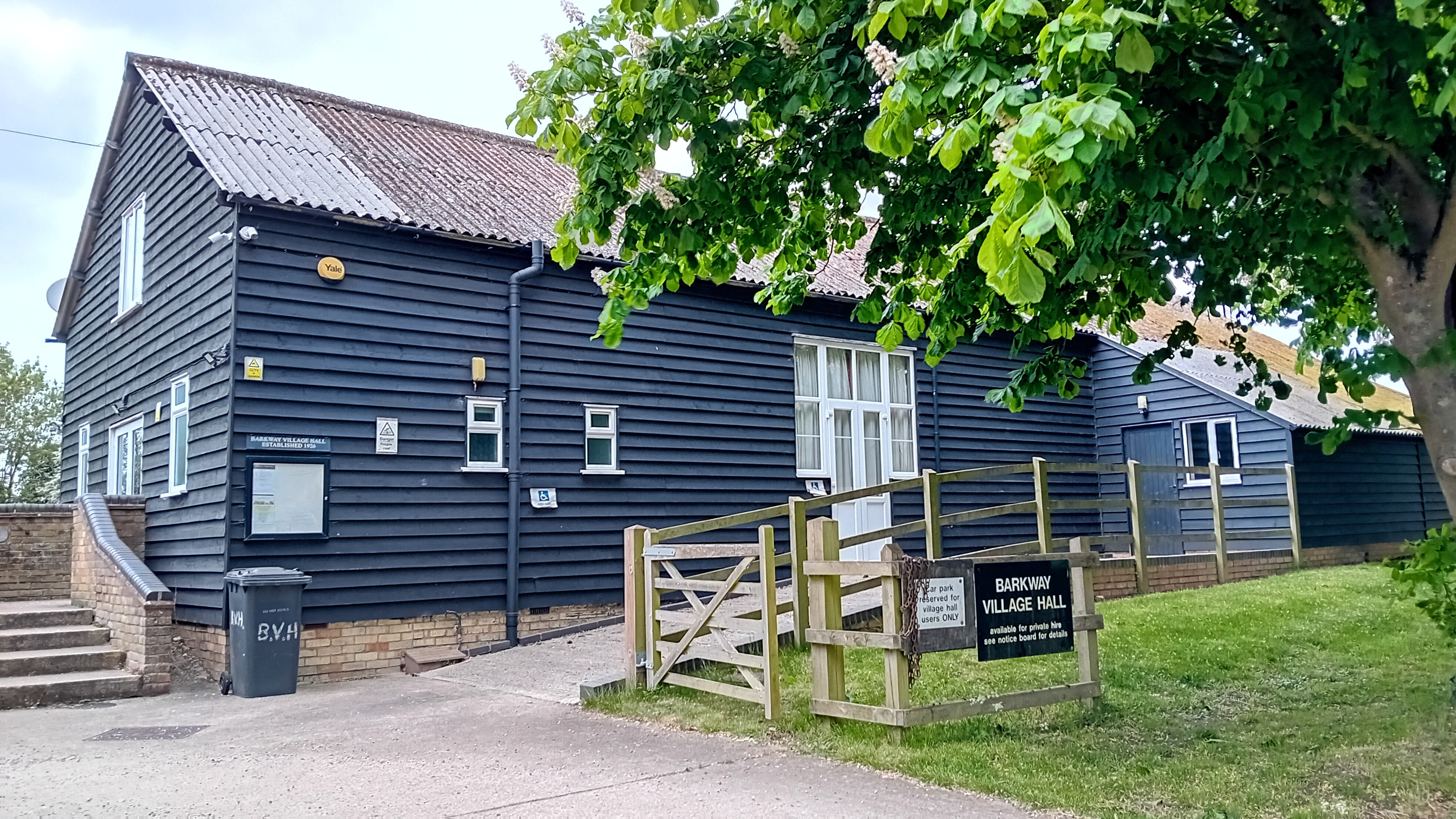
Barkway Village Hall

The village has an infants' school, the Tally Ho pub, a recreation ground with children's play area and football pitch, a golf course, a garage and a number of active social organisations. There is a village hall on Cambridge Road.

Two major country estates are adjacent to the north of the village: Cokenach, which has a long-established cricket club, and Newsells which is now a stud farm.

== Governance ==
Barkway has three tiers of local government at parish, district and county level: Barkway Parish Council, North Hertfordshire District Council, and Hertfordshire County Council. The parish council meets at the recreation ground pavilion on Cambridge Road (opposite the village hall).

Barkway is an ancient parish, and it was part of the hundred of Edwinstree. The parish historically included the hamlet of Nuthampstead. Nuthampstead took on civil functions under the poor laws from the 17th century onwards and therefore became a separate civil parish in 1866, when the legal definition of 'parish' was changed to be the areas used for administering the poor laws. Despite becoming a separate civil parish, Nuthampstead remains part of the ecclesiastical parish of Barkway.

== Population ==
The parish had a population of 849 at the 2021 census. The population had been 775 in 2011, and 656 in 2001.

== Notable residents ==
- Sir Humphrey de Trafford, a prominent racehorse owner, resided at the Newsells Park Estate with his family from 1926 until his death in 1971.
- Richard J. Evans, Regius Professor Emeritus of History at Cambridge.

== See also ==
- RAF Barkway
- Nuthampstead, location of the Barkway VOR
- The Hundred Parishes
