= Furneux Pelham =

Village in Hertfordshire, England

Coordinates: 51.931°N 0.080°E

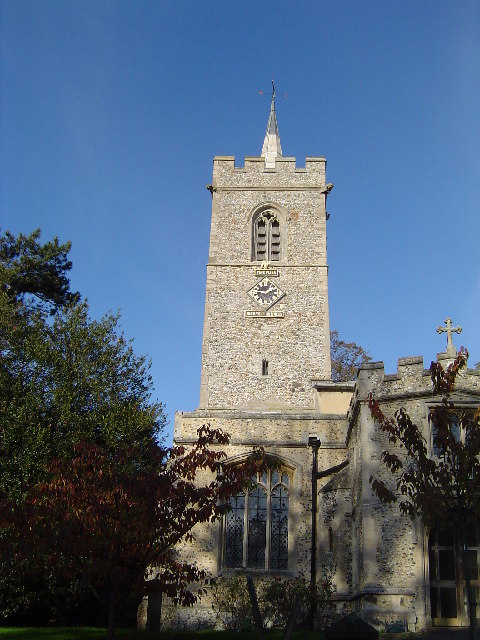
- Church clock, Furneux Pelham

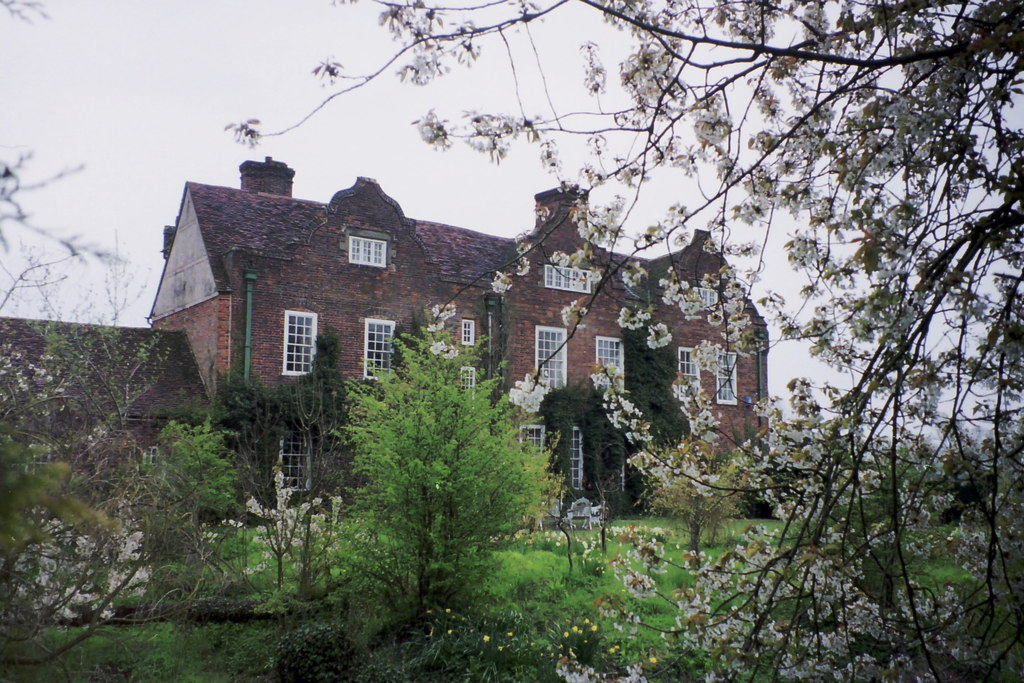
- Furneux Pelham Hall, West Wing

- Location within Hertfordshire
- Area: 4.18 km^{2} (1.61 sq mi)
- Population: 524 (Parish, 2021)
  - Density: 125/km^{2} (320/sq mi)
- OS grid reference: TL4327
- District: East Hertfordshire
- Shire county: Hertfordshire
- Region: East
- Country: England
- Sovereign state: United Kingdom
- Post town: BUNTINGFORD
- Postcode district: SG9
- Dialling code: 01279
- Police: Hertfordshire
- Fire: Hertfordshire
- Ambulance: East of England
- UK Parliament: North East Hertfordshire

Furneux Pelham /ˌfɜːrnəks ˈpɛləm/, also spelt Furneaux Pelham, is a village and civil parish in the East Hertfordshire district of Hertfordshire, England. It is one of three neighbouring parishes called Pelham which likely formed a single territory in medieval times, the others being Brent Pelham to the north and Stocking Pelham to the north-east. The village lies 4 miles (6 km) east of Buntingford, its post town. At the 2021 census the parish had a population of 524.

The village is largely linear covering much of the width of the parish from east to west and is buffered by gently sloped fields with some woodland to all sides. It is known for its ford (Violet's Lane) to the northeast along the upper Ash which is over 1 kilometre (1,100 yd) long traversable by 4x4 enthusiasts most of the year and in the periods of least flow by experienced off-road motorcyclists.

== Landmarks ==
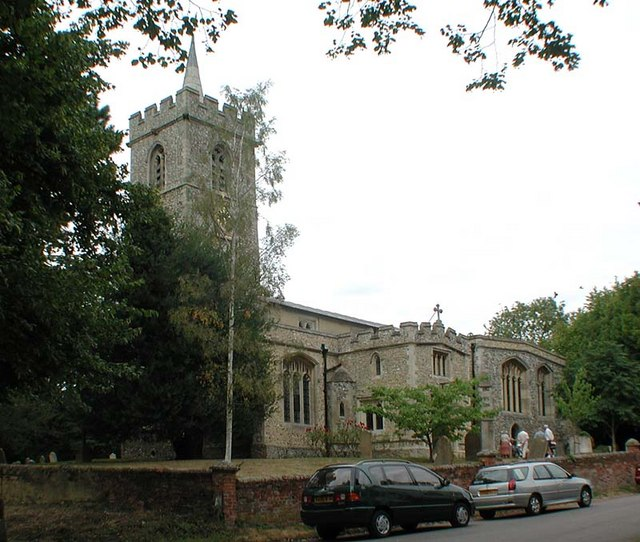
Main aspect of church

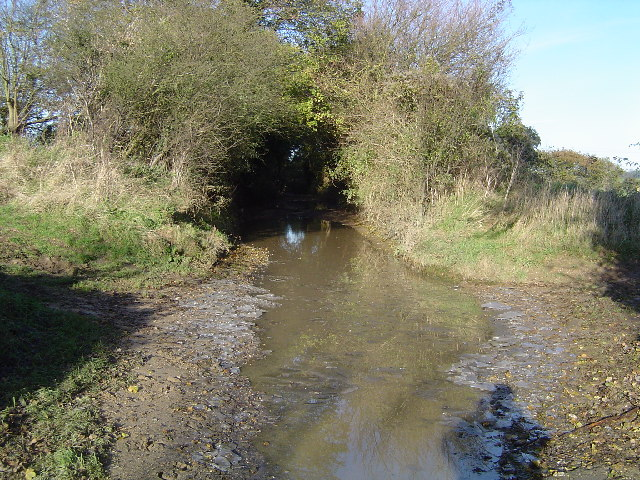
Part of the 1000 yard (1 km) long ford

The village has a church, St Mary the Virgin, with a medieval carved wooden roof which was restored and elaborately painted in the 1960s by the artist John Norbury. The tower has the motto "Time Flies", "Mind your Business'" above and below the clock face. Furneux Pelham has a large pub the Brewery Tap opposite the site of the former Rayments Brewery. A central cluster of 11 homes is pre-Edwardian and listed around one of the village's three-ways junctions accompanied by later houses in more basic and some in a similar style.

=== Furneux Pelham Hall ===
Furneux Pelham Hall is Grade II* listed and has two barns dating to the 17th and 18th century with some farmland to the west. It is late 16th century with later modifications. It has distinctive half-free gable ends with small attic windows inbuilt with intermittent square-moulded brick labels to resemble stone, along with a dark brick façade and large contrasting white 19th-century wood-barred and transomed casements around the windows. Its main staircase dates from the late 17th century as does the wood panelling, as well as from the preceding century.

In the far south-east Hixham Hall, a farm and from its name implying a former lesser manor, has a granary and barn which are of 17th-century timber-framed construction, initial category but rare listed buildings in the home counties of this type and date.

=== Barleycroft End and East End ===
The village street progresses east into these localities of Furneux Pelham.

== History ==
Pelham undivided in the Domesday book of 1086 appears as one key holding of that survey and six others. It contained 105 households and was assessed as worth 12.3 geld/gold units (very large) taxable at 3.3 geld units. To its lord in 1066 its people rendered £6 per year; then one less in 1086 (£5). Its main holding counted (as men or other heads of household) 7 villagers, 7 smallholders, 1 slave, 1 priest and 6 cottagers recorded in the national survey, 7 ploughlands, 3 lord's plough teams, 4 men's plough teams, meadow of 2.5 ploughlands, woodland worth 100 pigs. Its lords in 1066 were five freemen and one thane as feudal tenants holding of Almer of Bennington; King Edward and Eskil of Ware. Its replacement lords by 1086 were two men-at arms holding of the Bishop of London (St Paul's).

In the 19th century the economy remained very agricultural, with large families occupying fewer buildings and few of the other industries, retired economic sector and broad-based businesses seen today.

...a parish, in the union of Bishop-Stortford...5½ miles (E. by S.) from Buntingford; containing 682 inhabitants. The living [benefice] is a discharged [of upkeep of church] vicarage, consolidated with that of Brent-Pelham, and valued in the king's books at £9: the impropriate tithes have been commuted [ended] for £545. 10., and the vicarial [remaining until conversion with the church] for £151...the burial-place of the Calvert family, on the south side of the chancel; at the west end is a square tower, embattled, and surmounted by a short spire.

— Samuel Lewis (publisher)

The former brewery of the village was built in 1860 by William Rayment and when it was purchased by Greene King in 1928 it had an estate of 35 public houses. The brewery closed in 1987 while supplying, optionally with other Greene King competing ales, 27 public houses with its one remaining beer, Rayments BBA.

A murder took place of retired Lieutenant-Colonel Robert Riley Workman on 7 January 2004. The former gamekeeper who committed the murder later confessed while in prison for another murder and was sentenced to a minimum of 32 years in November 2012.

== See also ==
- The Hundred Parishes
