= Cold Christmas =

Hamlet in Hertfordshire, England

Coordinates: 51.835590°N 0.002912°E

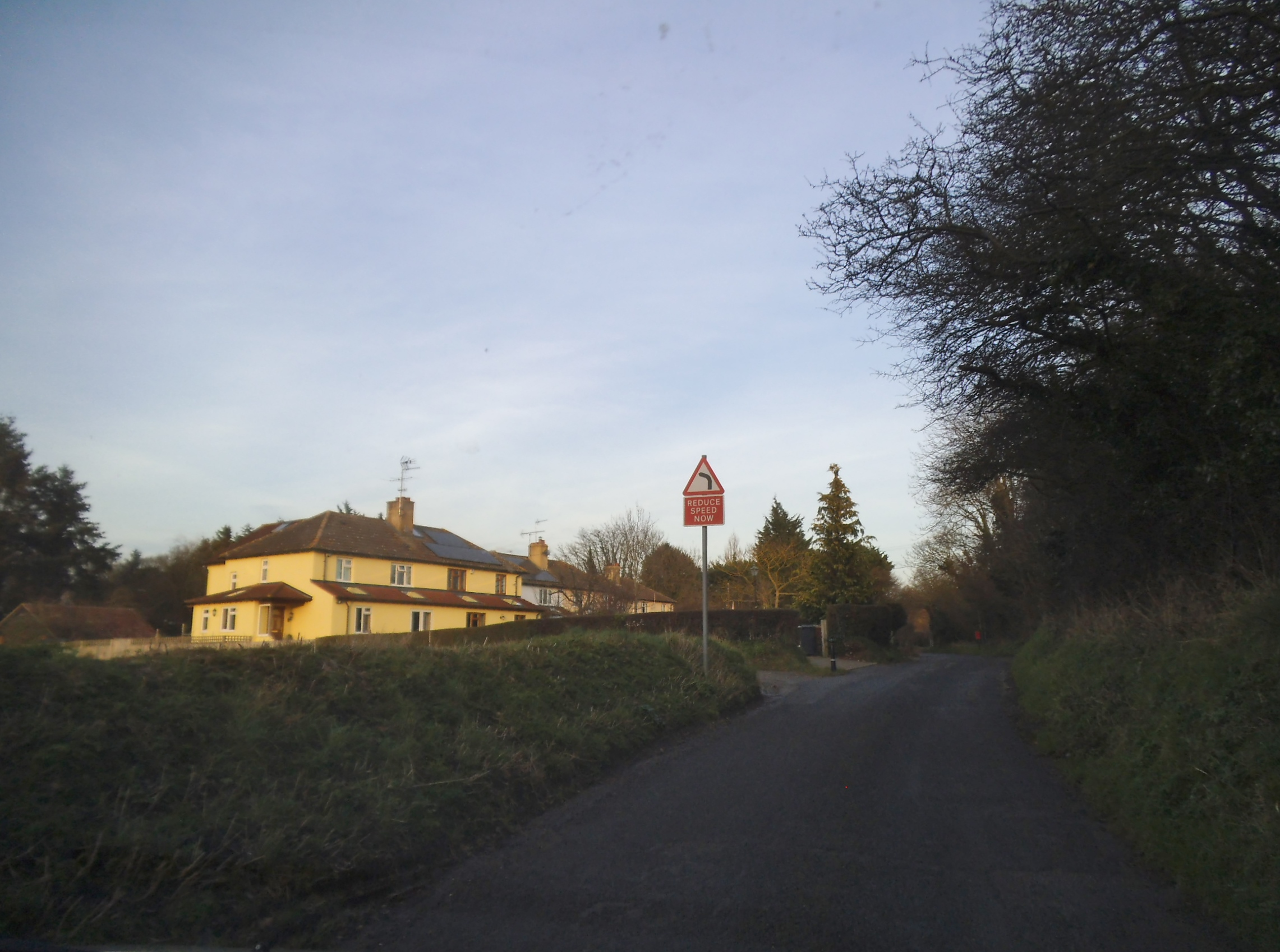
- Cold Christmas Lane

- Location within Hertfordshire
- Civil parish: Thundridge
- District: East Hertfordshire
- Shire county: Hertfordshire
- Region: East
- Country: England
- Sovereign state: United Kingdom
- Post town: WARE
- Postcode district: SG12
- Police: Hertfordshire
- Fire: Hertfordshire
- Ambulance: East of England

Cold Christmas is a small hamlet in the civil parish of Thundridge, in the East Hertfordshire district, in the county of Hertfordshire, England. It is near to the South bank of the River Rib which flows in the valley below towards Wadesmill. The area's unusual place name may derive from a period of high child mortality during harsh winters and the associated burials recorded at the local church.

== Location ==
It is about 3 miles away from the town of Ware and the large town of Hertford (the county town of Hertfordshire).

Nearby villages include Wareside, Thundridge and Barwick.

== Transport ==
For transport there is the A10 road and Ware railway station.

== Notable people ==
Actor Nigel Hawthorne lived in Cold Christmas with his partner, Trevor Bentham. Hawthorne died at his home on 26 December 2001 and his funeral took place in nearby Thundridge.

Chris Lowe of the pop duo Pet Shop Boys once lived in the Fabdens residence.
