= Colliers End =

Village in Hertfordshire, England, United Kingdom

Coordinates: 51.8679491°N 0.0102541°W

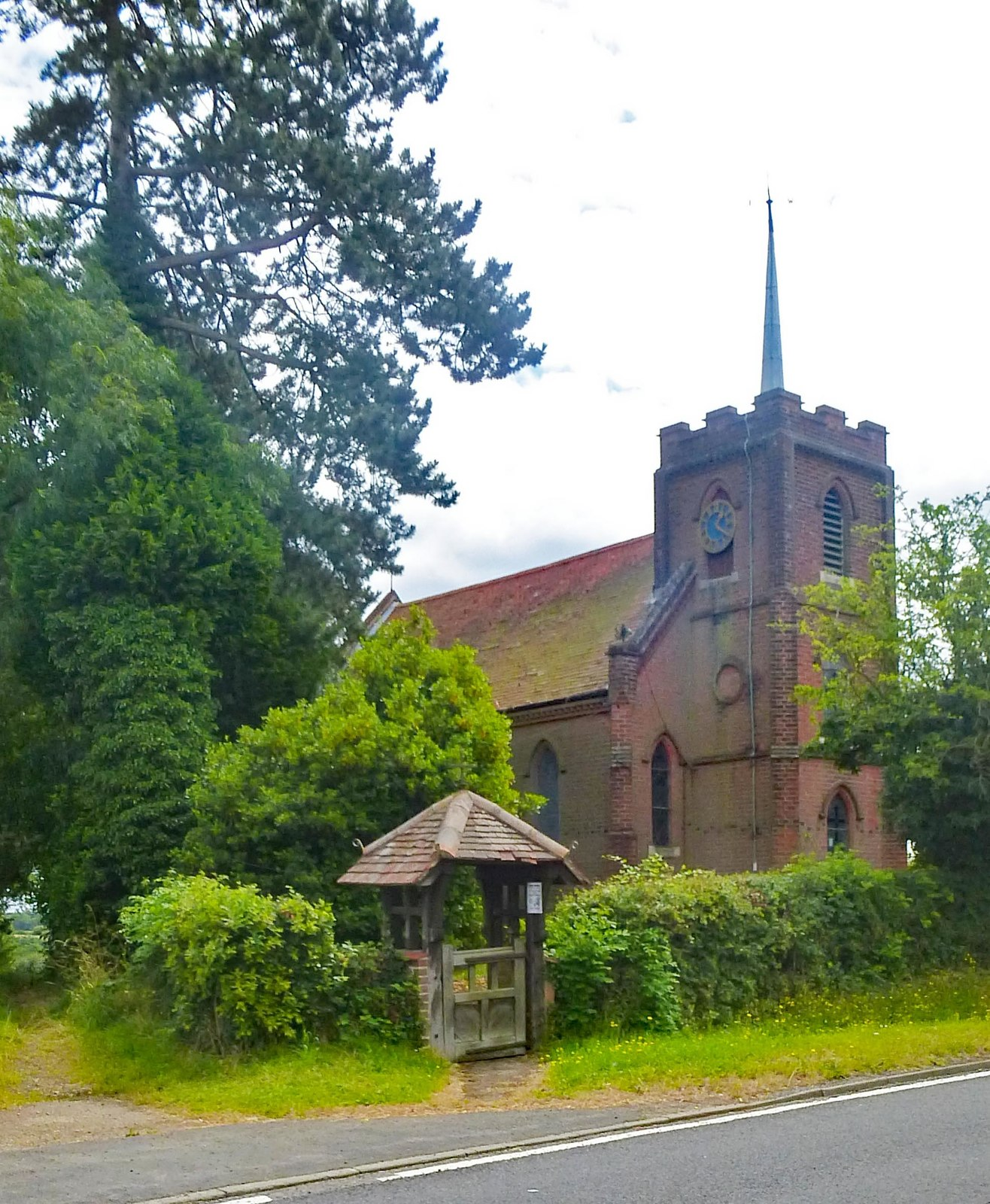

- Location within Hertfordshire
- Population: 415 (2011 census)
- Civil parish: Standon
- District: East Hertfordshire
- Shire county: Hertfordshire
- Region: East
- Country: England
- Sovereign state: United Kingdom
- Post town: WARE
- Postcode district: SG

Colliers End is a village in the civil parish of Standon, in the East Hertfordshire district, in Hertfordshire, England. It lies upon what was the A10, however the A10 Wadesmill by-pass has now been built around Colliers End and neighbouring villages. What was the A10 that used to run through Colliers End and the neighbouring settlements were once part of the Roman road, Ermine Street. It is 1.9 miles (3.1km) away from Standon and 5.7 miles (9.2km) away from the county town of Hertford. The population was 415 as of the 2011 census.

== Nearby settlements ==
Some nearby settlements include the hamlet of High Cross to the south, the village of Standon to the northeast, and the hamlet of Levens Green to the northwest.
