= River Rib =

River in Hertfordshire, England

Coordinates: 51°48′N 0°04′W

Rib
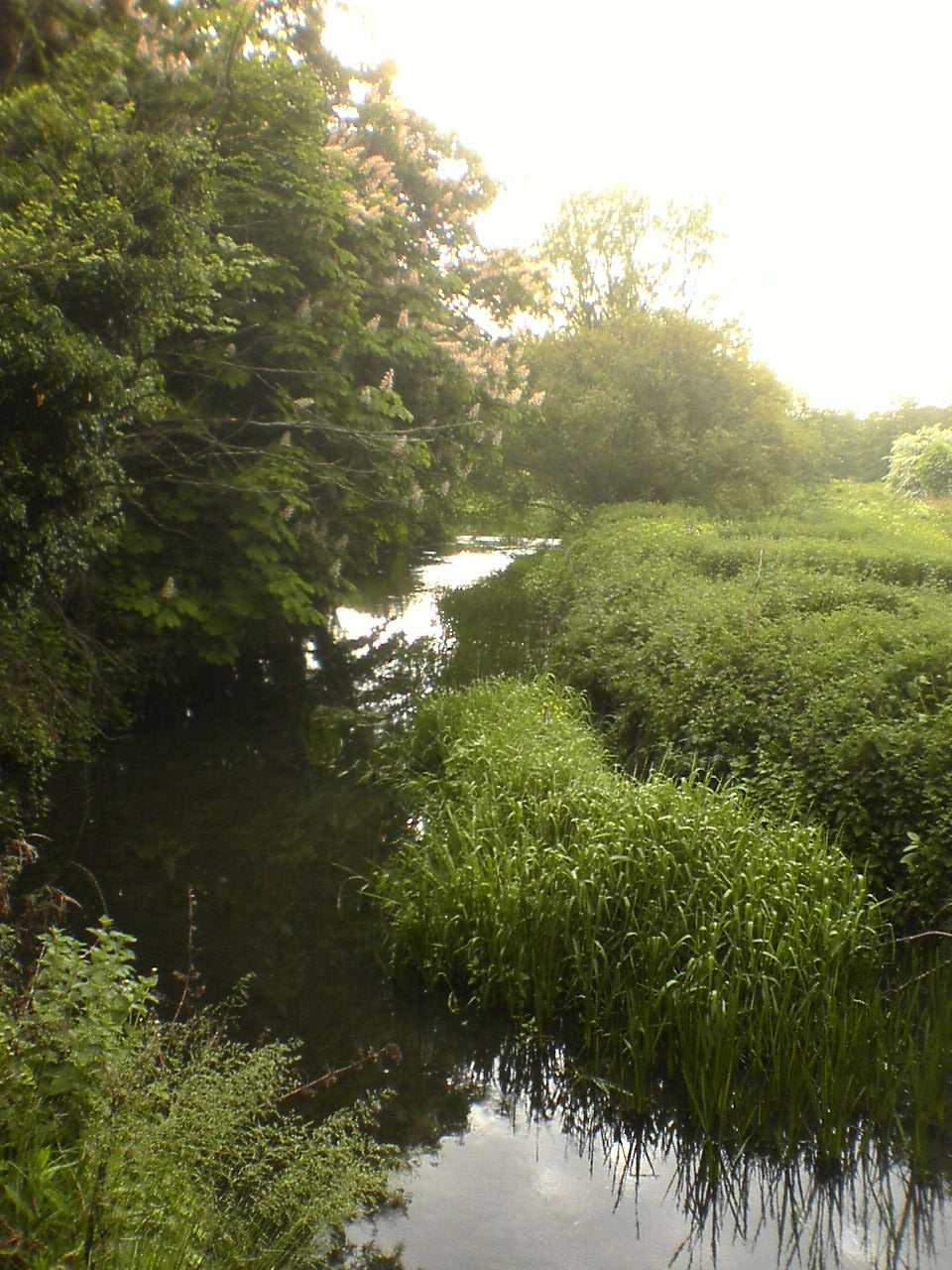
- The Rib close to its confluence with the River Lea

Location
- Country: United Kingdom

Physical characteristics
- Source
  - location: Buckland Nr. Buntingford, Hertfordshire
  - elevation: 130 m (430 ft)
- Mouth
  - location: Hertford, Hertfordshire into River Lea
- Length: 30.7 km (19.1 mi)

The River Rib is a chalk river and a tributary of the River Lea, which runs from Buckland in Hertfordshire, England. It flows into the River Lea to the east of Hertford.

== Course ==
Course of the River Rib

The River Rib originates near the East Hertfordshire village of Buckland and runs parallel with the A10 through Chipping, Wyddial, Buntingford, Westmill, and Braughing, where it is joined by its major tributary, the River Quin.

From Braughing, it flows through Puckeridge and Standon, before dividing the villages of Thundridge and Wadesmill

Grade II Listed road bridge over the River Rib, Thundridge, Hertfordshire, UK. Designed 1824-5 by Mr Robson, built by contractors Brough & Smith of London for the Cheshunt Turnpike Trustees.

and continuing until it reaches its confluence with the River Lea near Hertford.

== History ==
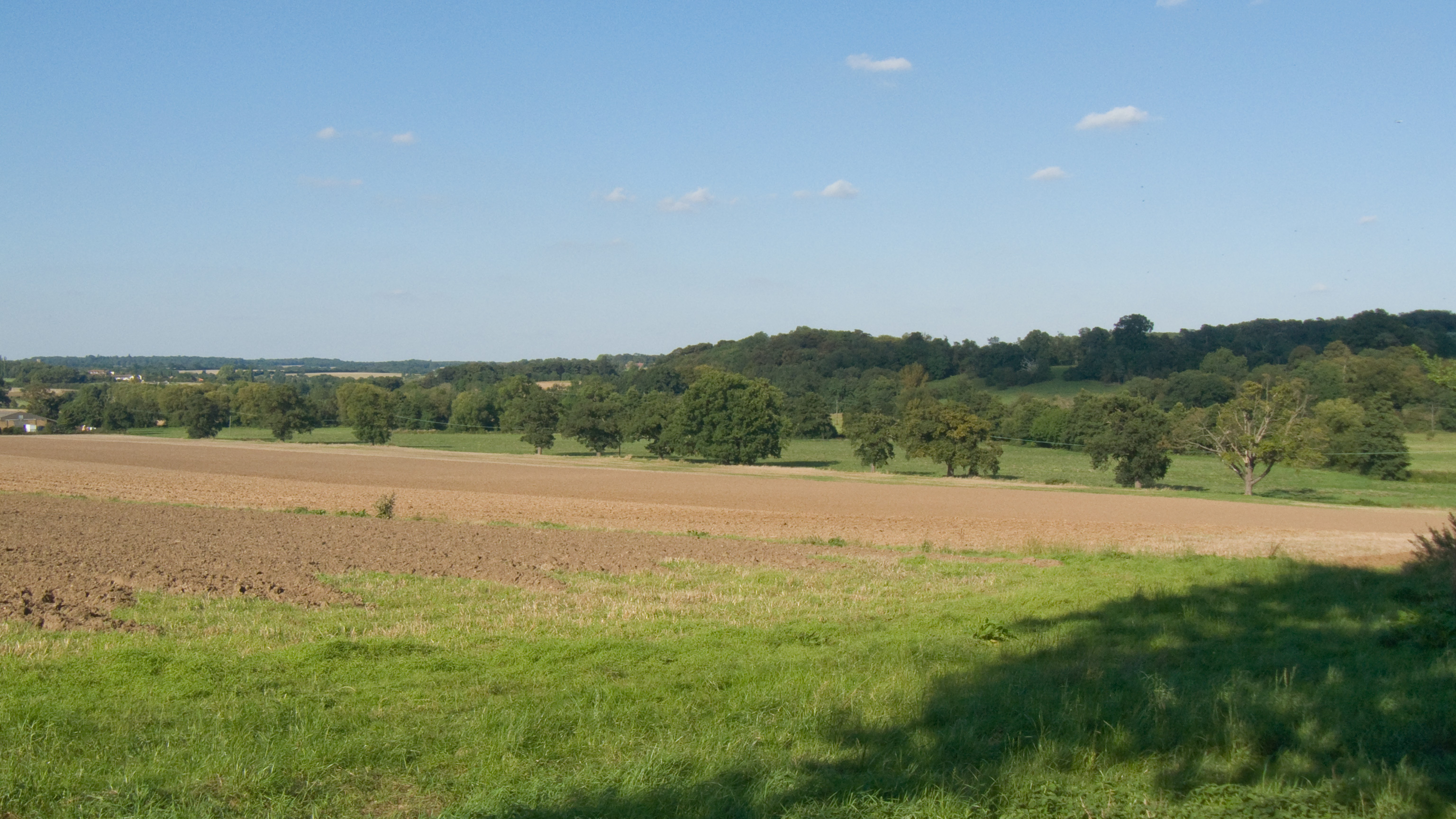
Rib Valley near Bengeo

The River Rib was used to power an overshot watermill at Ware Park between Hertford and Ware.

The River Rib used to have frequent floods due to heavy rain in the autumn, but this propensity was resolved by dredging and engineering work in the 1970s. It was used as the main water supply in Buntingford and the surrounding areas before a pump was installed
