= Chipping, Hertfordshire =

Hamlet in East Hertfordshire, England

Coordinates: 51.9703°N 0.0279°W

Chipping
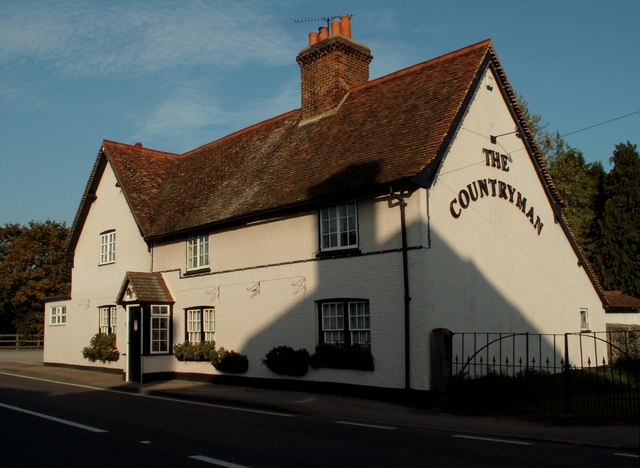
- The Countryman

- Location within Hertfordshire
- Population: 274 (including Buckland) (2011 Census)
- OS grid reference: TL 35567 32012
- Civil parish: Buckland and Chipping
- District: East Hertfordshire
- Shire county: Hertfordshire
- Region: East
- Country: England
- Sovereign state: United Kingdom
- Post town: Buntingford
- Dialling code: 01763
- Police: Hertfordshire
- Fire: Hertfordshire
- Ambulance: East of England
- UK Parliament: North East Hertfordshire

Chipping is a hamlet and former market town in the civil parish of Buckland and Chipping in the East Hertfordshire district of Hertfordshire, England. Situated along the A10 road, which follows the course of the Roman Ermine Street, Chipping was an early attempt at a planted town designed to support the establishment of a market at the crossing of the River Rib and Ermine Street. It formally held town status after being granted a royal charter by King Henry III in 1252.

Lying in a valley, Chipping is located approximately 2 miles (3 km) north of Buntingford and 6 miles (10 km) south of Royston. It is situated half a mile west of the prime meridian. Prior to 1750, Chipping was referred to as New Chipping, though this name is rarely used today.

== Toponymy ==
The name Chipping likely derives from ceapen, an Old English word meaning 'market', referring to the town's historical commercial status between 1252 and 1360. Alternatively, the name may derive from the Medieval English word chepynge, meaning 'long market square', a theory supported by early references to the settlement as New Cheping.

While Chipping is a prefix used by several places in England, only Chipping, Lancashire shares the sole use of the name. The name New Chipping was commonly used prior to 1750 (and occasionally until 1900), specifically meaning 'new market'. The reason the prefix "New" was dropped is unknown, though the change was likely a gradual evolution over several centuries.

== History ==
=== Early history and Roman origins ===
Evidence suggests that the area around Chipping has been a site of human activity since ancient times. To the west of the current village, within Burhill Wood, lie the remains of earthworks and a former moat (largely destroyed in the 1950s) which suggest the presence of an Iron Age settlement or hill fort pre-dating the Roman occupation.

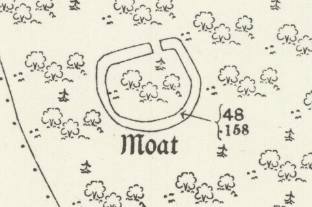
Moat in Burhill Wood (1897)

The settlement's location was heavily influenced by the construction of Ermine Street, a major Roman road connecting London to York. The road crosses the River Rib at Chipping, creating a strategic choke point. Archaeological evidence of Roman activity along the river valley supports the theory that this was an important ford crossing, likely used by Roman military traffic moving between the major settlement at Braughing to the south and Royston to the north.

By the time of the Domesday Book in 1086, the land was recorded as part of the manor of Buckland, held by the Bishop of Lincoln. The area was described as heavily wooded, with enough forest "to support 300 pigs," indicating a landscape dominated by dense woodland and agriculture long before the commercial village emerged. The current settlement of Chipping eventually developed from the manor of Pope's Hall (now Chipping Hall), which was originally a sub-manor within this estate. Chipping began to develop as an independent settlement around 1220. Although unnamed at that point, its position on Ermine Street made it a vital stop-off for travelers negotiating the steep hills between London and Cambridge.

=== Medieval market town (1252–1360) ===
In 1252, the settlement became known as 'New Cheping'. It was elevated to market town status on 23 September 1252, when King Henry III granted a royal charter to Bertram de Crioll, the Lord of the Manor of Pope's Hall. This charter authorised a weekly market to be held on Fridays and an annual three-day fair beginning on the vigil of the feast of St Gregory the Great (12 March). The town was established as an entrepreneurial venture, identifying Chipping's position in the valley of the River Rib as a strategic location to generate revenue from passing traffic on the Roman Ermine Street.

The town experienced significant initial success; by 1322, historical records indicate that the tolls of the market were farmed for 16 shillings per year. However, 'New Cheping' struggled to grow as rapidly as the neighbouring settlement of Buntingford. By 1360, Elizabeth de Burgh, who held the market as part of her inheritance, sought to consolidate trade. She was granted a market at Buntingford 'in lieu' of the one at Chipping, which at the time was being held in a 'vacant place' (placea). This transfer effectively ended Chipping's 108-year status as a primary commercial hub, with trade being redirected to Buntingford. Although the settlement began to decline thereafter, vestiges of its former status lingered for centuries; it was not until 1883 that the remaining annual fairs at Chipping and Buckland were officially abolished.

=== The English Civil War and the Squire Papers hoax ===
In April 1643, during the second year of the English Civil War, Chipping was the site of a notable fight situated along a difficult section of Ermine Street. In the accounts found in the "Squire Papers," a group of Parliamentarians was dispatched by Oliver Cromwell to collect treasure from Cambridge, along with a new helmet ordered by Cromwell, who found his previous one "ill-set." While passing through Chipping, the party was set upon by a Royalist force with "so much vigour, and evidently superior numbers that while the fight was proceeding some of the attacking party carried on with most of the baggage."

After intense fighting, the Parliamentarians managed to repel the Royalist assault and escape with the treasure and Cromwell's new helmet. One Parliamentarian involved in the notable fight later recalled: "We went up with the treasure; got sadly mauled coming back by ruffians at Chipping, but lost near all our luggage." Upon the delivery of the new helmet, Cromwell commended the party for their victory in the engagement. This "Chipping helmet" became the first of the recognisable lobster-tailed pot helmets that Cromwell famously wore throughout the remainder of the war.

While these details are documented in various historical collections, modern scholars, including Samuel Rawson Gardiner, have identified the "Squire Papers" as a 19th-century forgery. William Squire, the creator of the papers, successfully deceived the historian Thomas Carlyle, who included these vivid accounts in his 1847 work on Cromwell's letters. Although the fight is now regarded as a historical hoax by modern academics, the story of the notable engagement at Chipping remains a significant part of the hamlet's historical narrative and folklore.

=== 18th century to present ===
From 1700 until the mid-nineteenth century, the main occupation of Chipping's residents was farming, specifically working the dense woodland and farmland surrounding the village. The hamlet remained small, and its population never warranted the construction of a church.

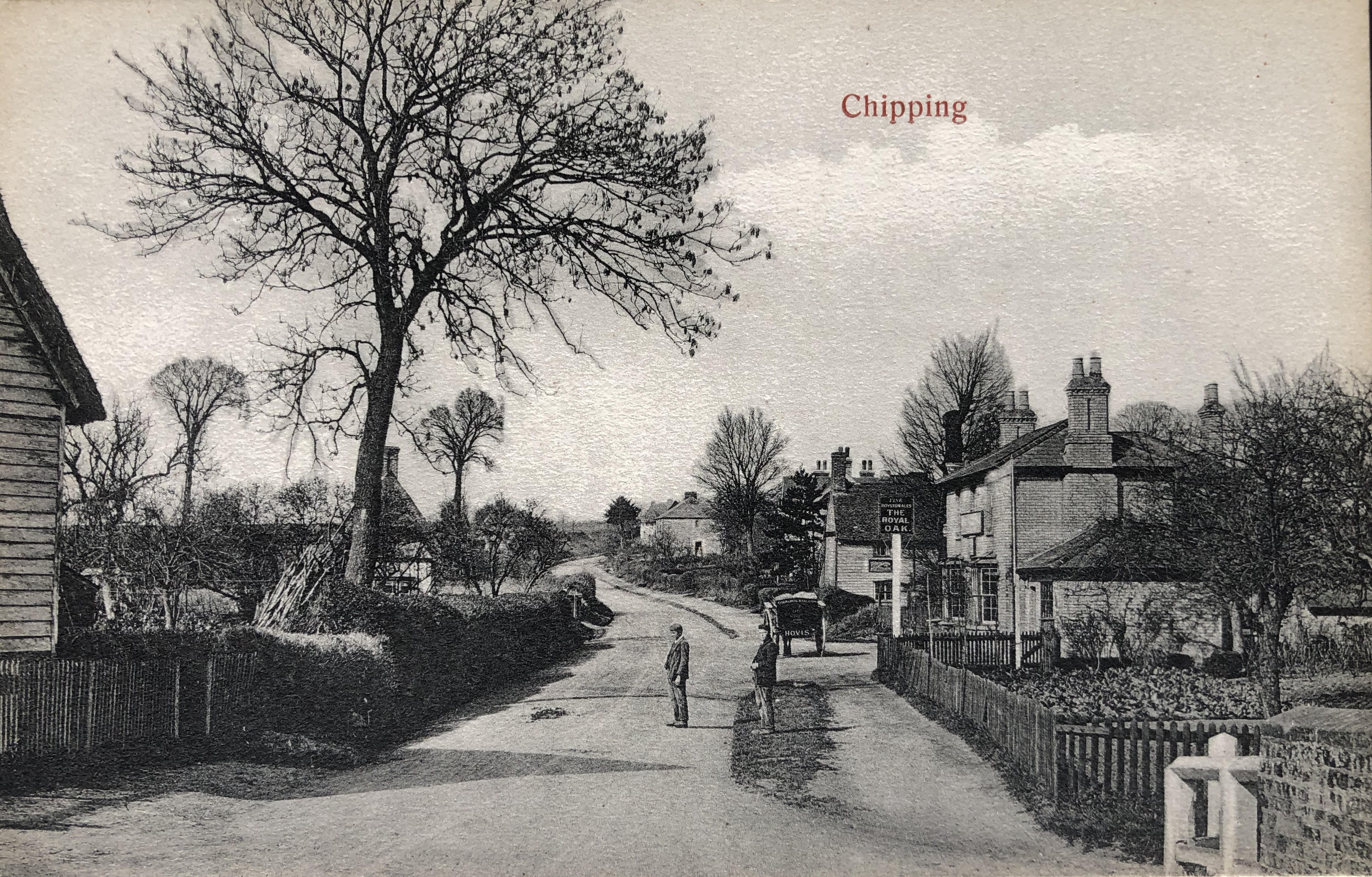
Chipping, 1905 (including the former Royal Oak public house)

Until the late nineteenth century, Chipping was divided between the parish of Therfield (on the west side of Ermine Street) and Buckland parish (to the east). Transport through the hamlet was significantly modernised during the 18th century when Ermine Street was turnpiked to improve the route for long-distance coaches. A post mill was situated on Mill Hill to the east of the village from around 1737 until 1838. Social life centered on the local inns, though the former public house, The Royal Oak, was destroyed by fire in the 1970s; its site now hosts the cul-de-sac Royal Oak Close.

== Geography ==
=== Landscape and Geology ===
Chipping is situated at the foot of three hills: Chipping Hill to the north, Capons Hill to the east, and Mill Hill to the west. The underlying geology of the area consists of Cretaceous chalk typical of the East Anglian Heights, which is overlain by a thick layer of glacial boulder clay. This heavy soil historically supported the dense woodland used for pannage (grazing pigs). The River Rib runs through the village, crossed by Chipping Bridge on the A10 and two fords along public footpaths.

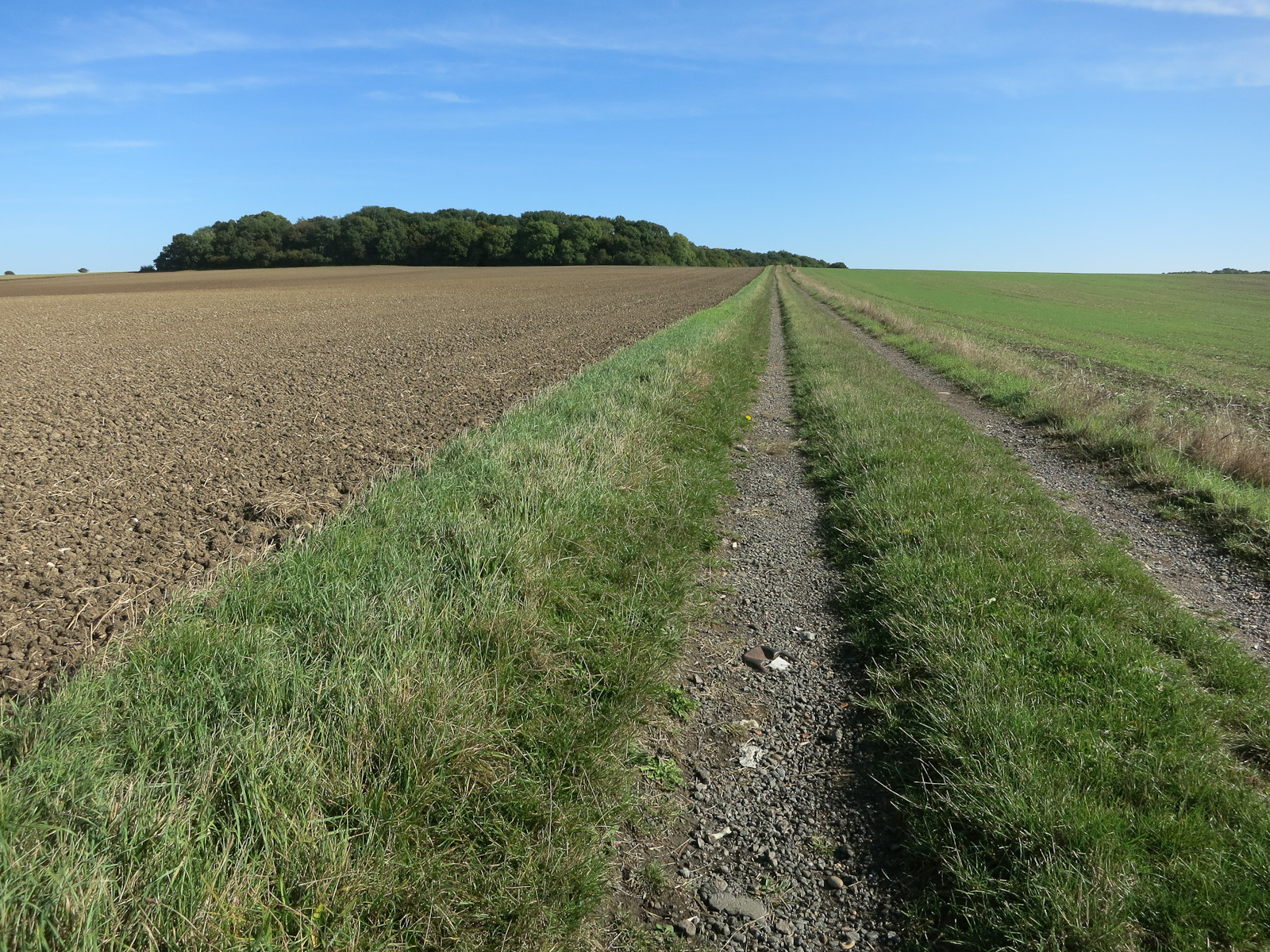
Bridleway to Capons Wood

Today, only Capons Wood to the east and Burhill Wood to the west survive. College Wood was removed in the 1950s and 60s, and Burhill Wood was reduced in size by approximately 80% to expand farmland.

=== Wildlife ===
The land surrounding Chipping is dominated by arable farmland growing winter wheat, rapeseed, borage, and broad beans. This habitat supports several species of farmland birds, including the grey partridge, lapwing, skylark, yellowhammer, and corn bunting. These species are commonly observed along the various bridleways and public footpaths surrounding Chipping, such as the path to Capons Wood.

== Religion ==
Historically, Chipping's location on Ermine Street made it a significant transit point for travellers, merchants, and itinerant preachers. Despite its medieval importance as a market centre, the hamlet never possessed its own parish church, as the settlement was historically divided between the ecclesiastical parishes of Buckland and Therfield. This geographical split, combined with the distance from the parish church in Buckland, necessitated the construction of local places of worship for both the established church and nonconformist denominations.

=== Congregational Chapel ===
A Congregational Chapel was established in the hamlet in 1844, representing the Nonconformist (Independent) tradition. It provided a place of worship for residents who did not adhere to the Church of England and was often served by visiting ministers from Buntingford and Royston. It served the village's independent worshippers for over a century before closing due to a decline in rural congregations; the building survives today as a private residence.

=== The Mission Hall ===
To serve the Anglican community, the Mission Hall (historically the Mission Room) was constructed in 1878 at a cost of approximately £380. Built to provide a convenient place of worship for those living over a mile from St Andrew's Church in Buckland, it hosted Sunday evening services and acted as a village social hub until its decommissioning in the late 1970s. It was converted into a domestic dwelling known as "The Old Mission Hall" between 1978 and 1982.

== Landmarks ==
Chipping contains several historic structures that reflect its development from a medieval market town to an 18th-century coaching stop and 20th-century residential hamlet. The most prominent residence is Chipping Hall, formerly known as Pope's Hall. This Grade II listed Georgian manor house dates from the early eighteenth century and is constructed of red brick in the early Georgian style, featuring a symmetrical facade and traditional sash windows. The manor has ancient origins, having been inherited by Lionel of Antwerp, 1st Duke of Clarence through his wife Elizabeth de Burgh, 4th Countess of Ulster.

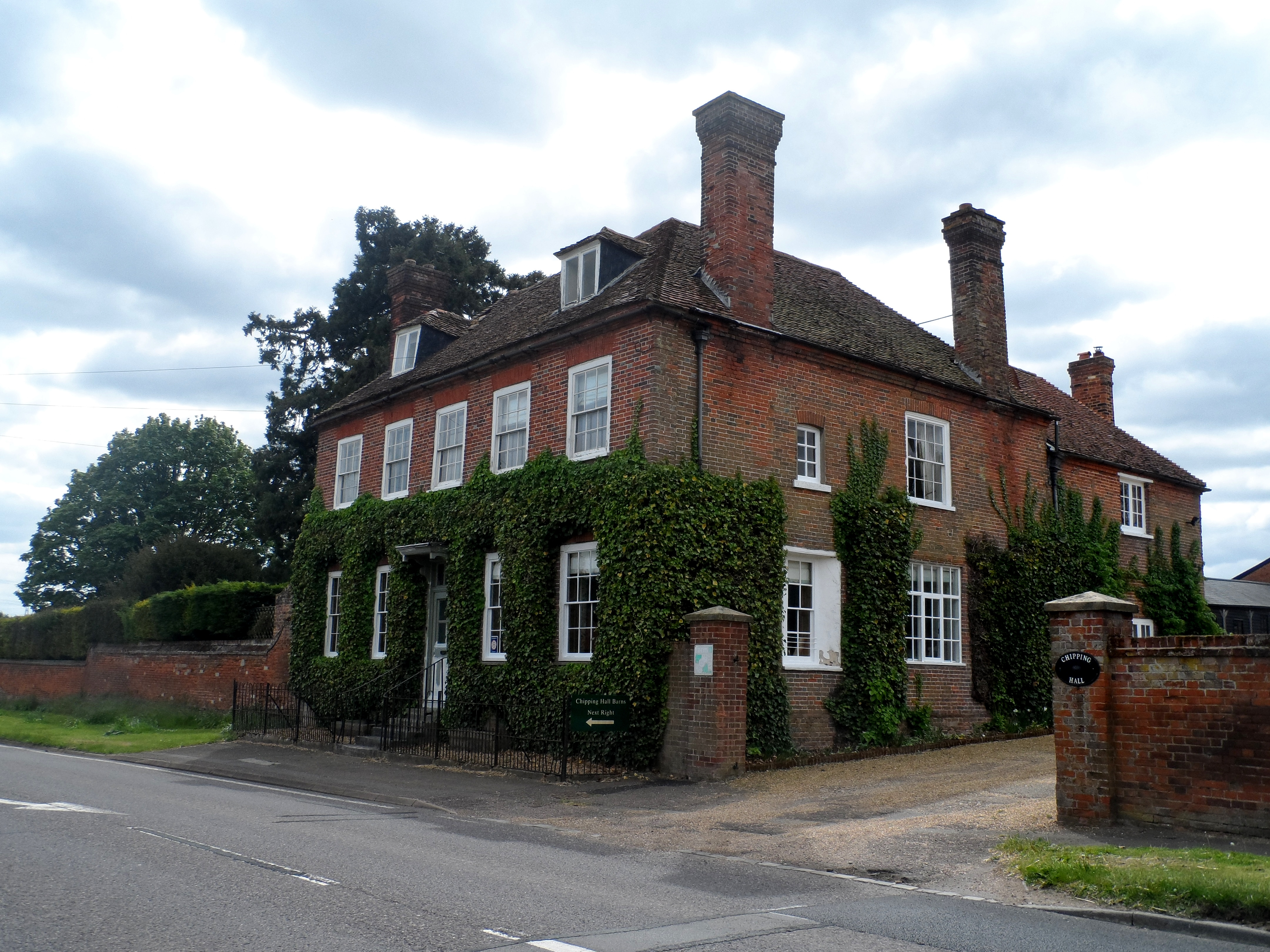
Chipping Hall (formerly Pope's Hall)

The village's surviving public house, The Countryman Inn, is a significant 17th-century coaching inn built in 1663. Originally known as The Red Lion Inn, it has operated as a pub since 1760 and retains many of its original timber-framed features and low-beamed ceilings. In modern times, the pub has gained local notoriety for hosting the annual 'World Sausage Tossing Championship' since 2014, a community event that draws visitors to the hamlet. The Countryman Inn closed in 2021 before reopening in 2024 as the Countryman Tea Room.

Architectural history is also represented by the Brookside council houses. These six dwellings are notable as some of the first examples of council housing in the United Kingdom, having been constructed under the Addison Act of 1919. This legislation was a landmark in British social history, designed to provide "homes fit for heroes" following World War I.

== Today ==
=== Population ===
In 1851, the population of Chipping was 215. However, the development of the railway reduced road traffic while the demand for industrial workers in cities grew, leading to a population decline to below 100 by 1905. As of 2011, the hamlet consists of approximately 50 houses with a population estimated between 125 and 150. The combined civil parish of Buckland and Chipping had a population of 274 in the 2011 Census.

=== Local government ===
Along with its neighbour Buckland, Chipping elects members to the Buckland and Chipping Parish Council. Chipping lies within the Buntingford ward of the Hertfordshire County Council and the East Hertfordshire District Council, the latter of which is represented by three district councillors. Nationally, Chipping is situated in the North East Hertfordshire parliamentary constituency.

== Transport ==
Bus services in the village are provided by Richmonds Coaches. They run services to surrounding small villages and main town.

== See also ==
- Toponymy of England
- List of generic forms in British place names
