= Standon Preceptory =

Former Knights Hospitaller foundation

Coordinates: 51.8808°N 0.0272°E

Standon Preceptory was a Knights Hospitaller foundation located in the parish of Standon, Hertfordshire, England. It was founded before 1154, probably shortly after the Knights became possessors of the Standon Church in 1151, and dissolved before 1443–4.

Gilbert de Clare gave the church of Standon, 140 acres of land, and his vineyard to the Hospitallers, who used it as a residence for sisters of the order until 1180. The site was also used as a hospital and a school. The building had a dormitory above and a refectory and kitchen below. It may have housed a dozen or more Knights. At one time, two Sisters of the Order named Melisene and Johanna resided within the commandery.

When Henry VIII dissolved the monasteries, the manor, rectory, and right to recommend an Anglican vicar at Standon were given to Ralph Sadler. A fifteenth century timber-framed barn of aisle construction survives.
