= Trevor Bentham =

British screenwriter (1943–2025)

- Born: 11 October 1943
- Died: 19 October 2025 (aged 82)
- Occupations: Screenwriter; stage manager
- Partner: Nigel Hawthorne (1979 – Hawthorne's d. 2001)

Trevor Swithin Bentham (11 October 1943 – 19 October 2025) was a British stage manager and screenwriter (A Month by the Lake and The Clandestine Marriage).

For 22 years, he was the partner of actor Nigel Hawthorne. They met in 1968 when Bentham was stage-managing the Royal Court Theatre.

From 1979 until Hawthorne's death in 2001, they lived together, initially in Radwell near Baldock and later in Cold Christmas, both in Hertfordshire, England. The two were fundraisers for Garden House Hospice in Letchworth, Herts hospice and other local charities. After Hawthorne's death he had a relationship with Donald Macleary.

Bentham was diagnosed with muscular dystrophy in 1997.

Bentham died on 19 October 2025, aged 82.
