= Thundridge =

Village in Hertfordshire, England

Coordinates: 51.836°N 0.030°W

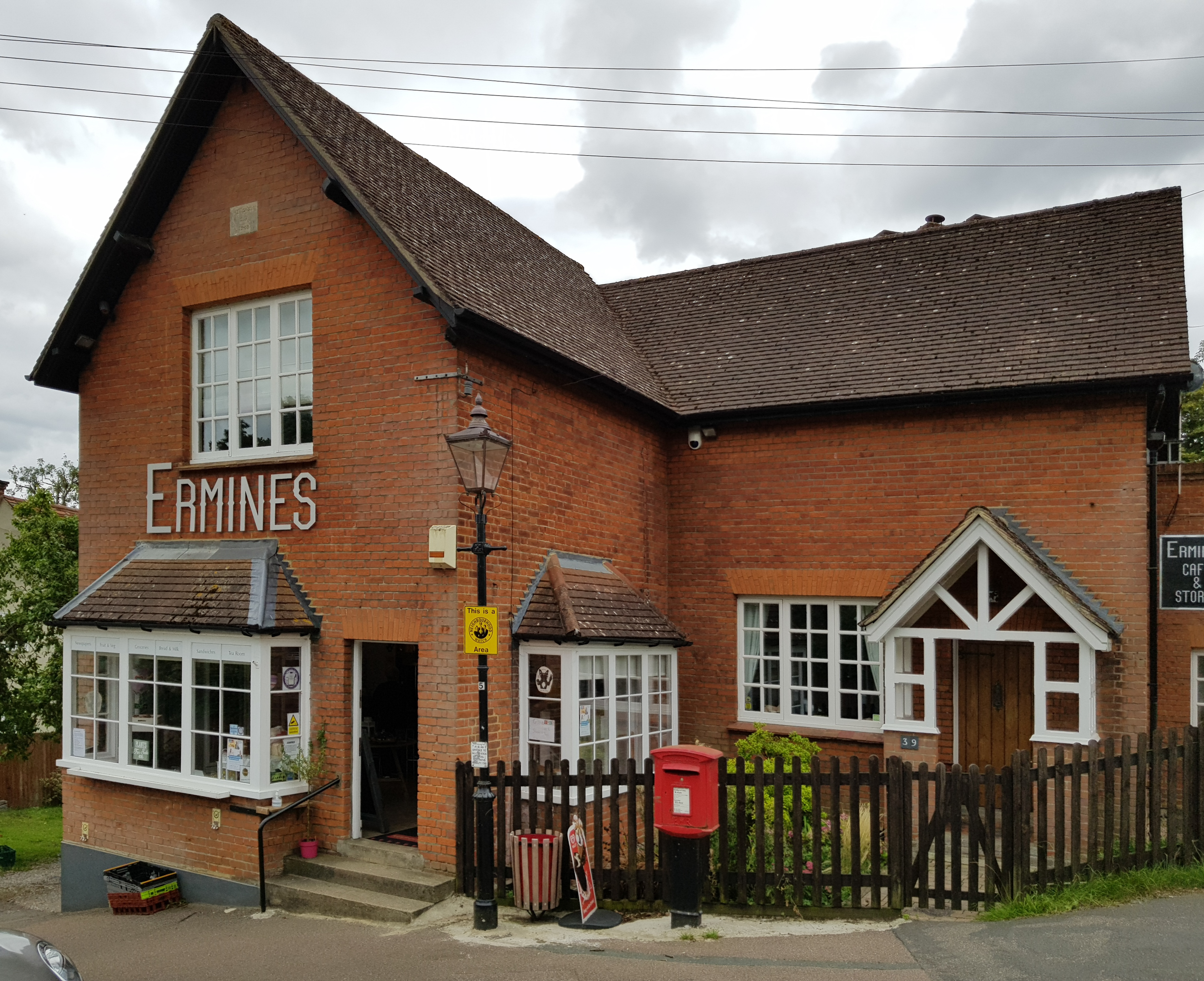
- Thundridge Village Stores

- Location within Hertfordshire
- Population: 1,571 (Parish, 2021)
- District: East Hertfordshire
- Shire county: Hertfordshire
- Region: East
- Country: England
- Sovereign state: United Kingdom
- Post town: WARE
- Postcode district: SG12
- Dialling code: 01920
- Police: Hertfordshire
- Fire: Hertfordshire
- Ambulance: East of England
- UK Parliament: North East Hertfordshire

Thundridge is a village and civil parish in the East Hertfordshire district of Hertfordshire, England. The village lies 2 miles (3 km) north of the centre of Ware, its post town. As well as the village itself, the parish also includes the villages of Wadesmill and High Cross, and the hamlet of Cold Christmas and surrounding rural areas. Thundridge village lies on the south bank of the River Rib, with Wadesmill opposite it on the north bank. Thundridge and Wadesmill are now classed as a single built up area by the Office for National Statistics. At the 2021 census, the parish had a population of 1,571.

== History ==
The village of Thundridge was originally located about half a mile to the east of the current Thundridge location, also adjacent to the River Rib. Thundridge derives from the Old English Þunres hrycg = "ridge belonging to the god Thunor or Thor". There are references to "Tonrich" in the Domesday Book with land being held by the Bishop of Bayeux and tenanted by Hugh de Grentmesnil, with the record indicating that there was a drop in the value of the land from 100 shillings to 40 shillings. There had however been civilised habitation in the area earlier than that, with both Roman and Saxon remains being found in the adjacent estate known as "Youngsbury" just a few hundred yards away from the old Thundridge location.

Grade II Listed road bridge over the River Rib, Thundridge, Hertfordshire, UK. Designed 1824-5 by Mr Robson, built by contractors Brough & Smith of London for the Cheshunt Turnpike Trustees.

With the 1826 improvement of the London to Cambridge road that included the construction of a new bridge to cross the River Rib, there was an increased populous migration to the "new" location of Thundridge, adjacent to the main road. Formerly the road had run a more crooked path through "Ermine" or "Back Street" in the village. All that now remain of the old Thundridge location are the 15th-century church tower of the "Thundridge Old Church" of All Hallows and Little Saint Mary, and a few bricks from the chimney-stack of the Manorial home of Thundridgebury. In recent years, the Old Church has come under threat from vandalism, decay and an ecclesiastical desire to divest itself of the cost and liability of maintenance. The "Thundridge Old Church Action Group" (abbr. "TOCAG") is working to achieve some form of permanent protection.

Thundridgebury was built during the reign of Henry VIII, possibly by Henry Gardiner – the Gardiners being a family that became prominent in later years, and giving name to the nearby wood "Gardiner's Spring". The last inhabitants of Thundridgebury were the Hollingsworth family, they having rented it from Daniel Giles, who had in turn purchased it from the Gardiners. The house was dismantled in the early 19th century, as was subsequently the church in 1853, with only the chimney-stack and tower remaining respectively. According to local legend, the chimney stack was left standing in order to allow the owners to continue to collect rent, but a later local legend (which was correct) was that its presence allowed the owners to maintain a pew in the new Thundridge church – built in the "new" Thundridge location in 1851 and consecrated in 1853 – as technically the manorial land which had been absorbed into the Youngsbury estate when purchased by the Giles, now fell under the parish of Standon, the church for which was some 5 miles distant. So long as the chimney-stack remained however, the pew in the Thundridge church was kept available for the owners of the (now combined) property of Youngsbury.

The River Rib historically formed the northern boundary of Thundridge parish, with the area north of the river forming part of the parish of Standon. Wadesmill was transferred from Standon parish to Thundridge in 1952. High Cross was subsequently also transferred from Standon to Thundridge in 1990.

== Transport ==
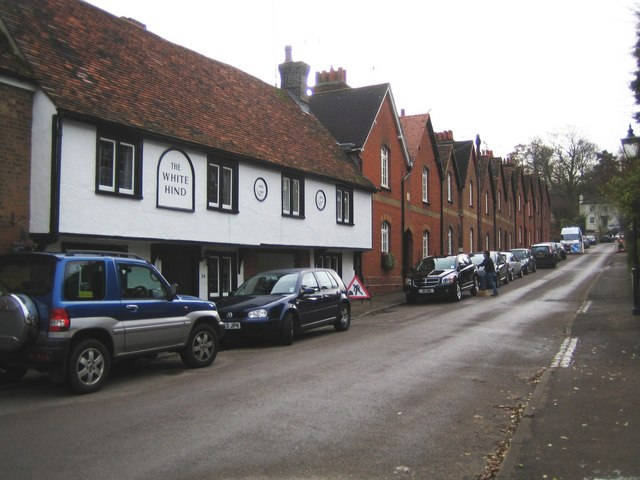
Thundridge "Back Street", now "Ermine Street" - geograph.org.uk - 951781

Thundridge is on Ermine Street, which is a Roman road, and it was on the A10 road until it was by-passed in 2005, restoring it to a quiet village.

Ware is the nearest railway station.

== Amenities ==
Thundridge has a preschool, a primary school, along with two pubs in the shape of Maltons (previously The Sow & Pigs), and The Feathers. The village also has a cricket team, along with Thundridge United Football Club, who play in the Hertford and District League 2.

== Population ==
The parish had a population of 1,571 at the 2021 census. The Office for National Statistics also defines a "Thundridge and Wadesmill" built up area covering those two villages. This built up area had a population of 705 in 2021.

== See also ==
- The Hundred Parishes
