= Hamlet (place) =

Small human settlement in a rural area

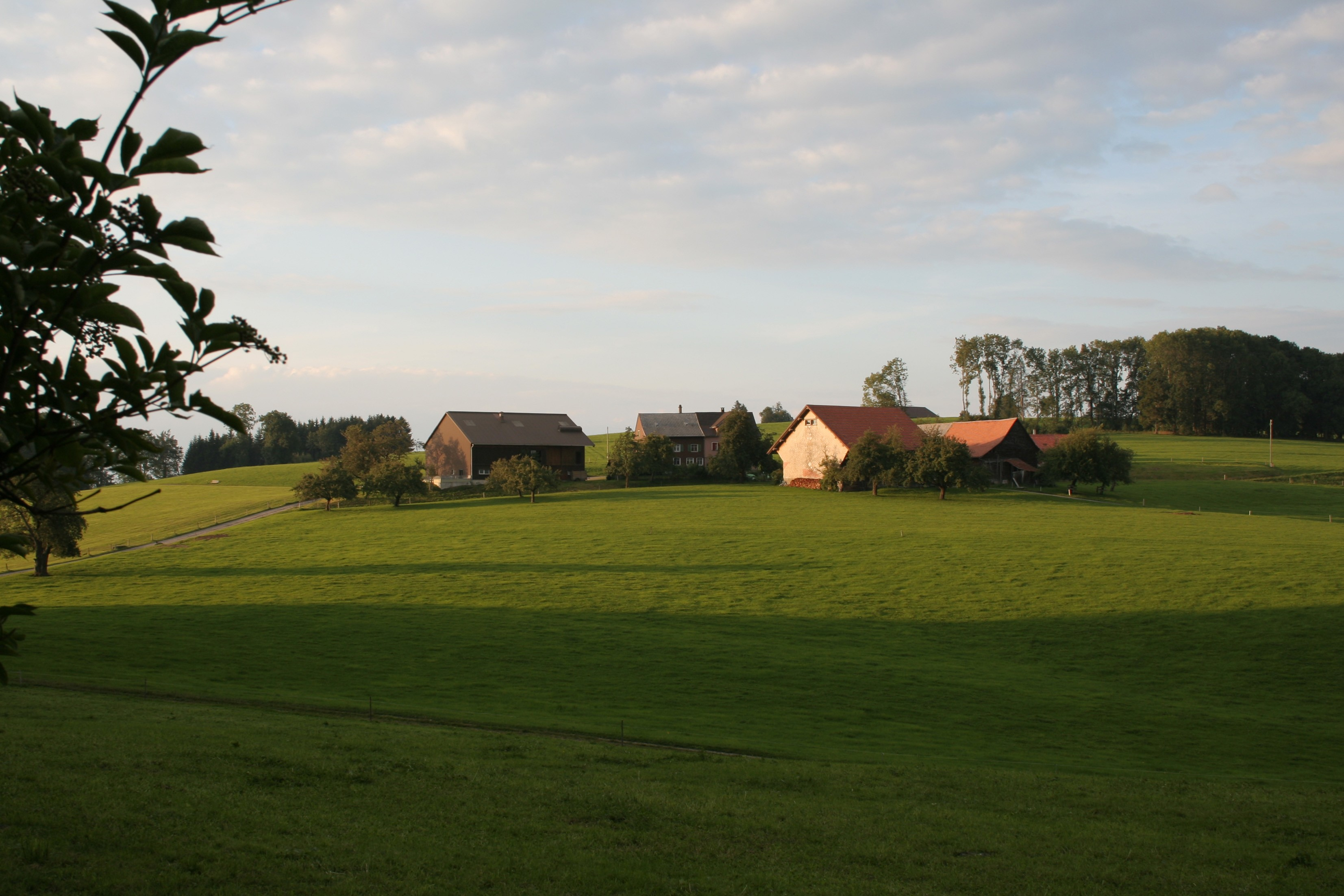
The hamlet Weiler Oberwil in Waldkirch, Switzerland

A hamlet is a human settlement that is smaller than a town or village. This is often simply an informal description of a smaller settlement or possibly a subdivision or satellite entity to a larger settlement. Sometimes, a hamlet is defined for official or administrative purposes.

The word and concept of a hamlet can be traced back to Norman England, where the Old French hamelet came to apply to small human settlements.

== Etymology ==
The word comes from Anglo-Norman hamelet, corresponding to Old French hamelet, the diminutive of Old French hamel meaning a little village. This, in turn, is a diminutive of Old French ham, possibly borrowed from (West Germanic) Franconian languages. It is related to the modern French hameau, Dutch heem, Frisian hiem, German Heim, Old English hām, and Modern English home.

== By country ==
=== Afghanistan ===
In Afghanistan, the word "hamlet" may be used to translate the term "qala" (Dari: قلعه, Pashto: کلي). The Afghan qala is a fortified group of houses, generally with a community building such as a mosque but without a marketplace. The qala is the smallest type of settlement in Afghan society, outsized by the village (Dari/Pashto: ده), which is larger and includes a commercial area.

=== Canada ===
In Canada's three territories, hamlets are officially designated municipalities.

- Northwest Territories had 11 hamlets, each of which had a population of fewer than 900 people as of the 2016 census;
- Nunavut had 24 hamlets, with populations ranging from 129 to 2,842 as of the 2016 census; and
- Yukon had two hamlets, both of which had a population of less than 450 people as of the 2016 census.

In Canada's provinces, hamlets are usually small unincorporated communities within a larger municipality (similar to civil townships in the United States), such as many communities within the single-tier municipalities of Ontario, Alberta's specialized and rural municipalities, and Saskatchewan's rural municipalities.

Canada's two largest hamlets—Fort McMurray (formerly incorporated as a city) and Sherwood Park—are located in Alberta. They each have populations, within their main urban area, over 60,000—well over the 10,000-person threshold that can choose to incorporate as a city in Alberta. As such, these two hamlets have been further designated by the Province of Alberta as urban service areas. An urban service area is recognized as equivalent to a city for provincial and federal program delivery and grant eligibility.

=== France ===
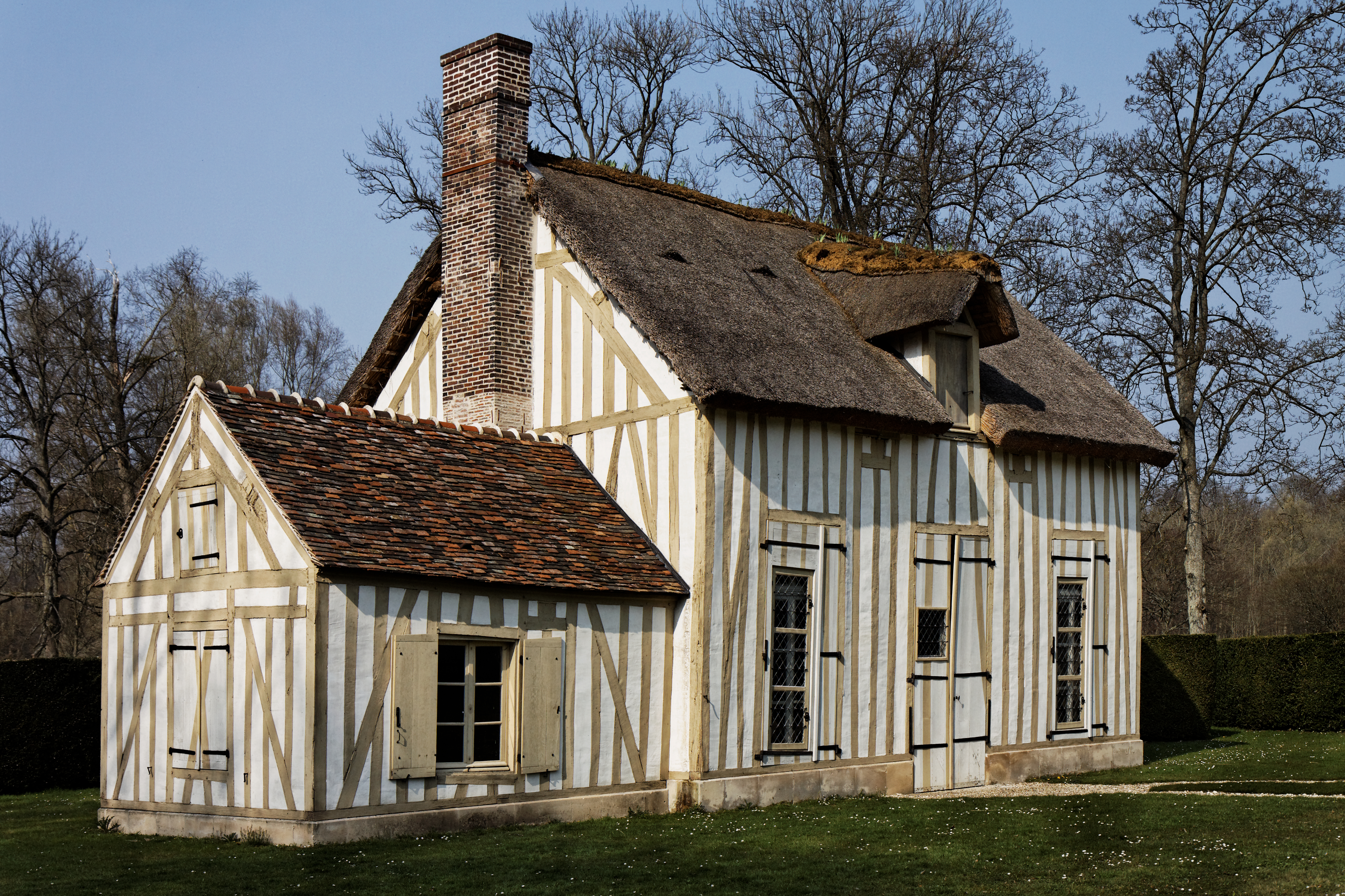
A cottage in the Hameau de Chantilly

A hamlet (French: hameau) is a group of rural dwellings, usually too small to be considered a village. The term lieu-dit is also applied to hamlets but it can also refer to uninhabited localities.

During the 18th century, it was fashionable for rich or noble people to create their hameau in their gardens. This was a group of houses or farms with a rustic appearance but very comfortable. The best known are the Hameau de la Reine, built by Queen Marie-Antoinette in the park of the Palace of Versailles, and the Hameau de Chantilly, built by Louis Joseph, Prince of Condé in Chantilly, Oise.

=== Germany ===
The word "hamlet" may be used to translate the term Weiler (German: [ˈva͡ɪlɐ]). Compared to a Dorf (village), a Weiler has no infrastructure (i.e. no inn, no school, no store, no church). The houses and farms of a Weiler can be grouped (in the hills and the mountains) or scattered (more often in the plains). In North West Germany, a group of scattered farms is called Bauerschaft. In a Weiler, there are no street names, the houses are just numbered.

There is no legal definition of a Weiler in Germany. In Bavaria, like in Austria, a Weiler is defined as a settlement with 3 to 9 dwellings, from 10 houses it is called a village.

=== Italy ===
In Italy, the term ‘frazione’ refers to a portion of inhabited territory within a municipality (the lowest level of subdivision, the "Comune"), generally located some distance from the centre of the town or village but still within the municipality's territory. In practice, if a village or town can be divided into neighbourhoods, i.e. portions of the same inhabited centre, the hamlets are located at a certain distance, creating a detached urban group. In many cases, some hamlets may have once been municipalities. Hamlets are always indicated by a sign, but they have no administrative function (at most, they may be polling stations). Small groups of houses that do not form a town and are further detached are called "località" (localites). We mention two examples in the Liguria Region: the coastal municipality of Camogli consists of the town centre and the hamlets of Ruta (a former Napoleonic municipality) and San Rocco. In turn, there are localities such as Boschetto, Case Rosse, Mortola, Porto Pidocchio and San Fruttuoso di Capodimonte, which are well separated but fall within the three main localities for all aspects of daily life. The municipality of Lumarzo, on the other hand, is known as a “scattered municipality” because it is made up of numerous separate centres without a main one, such as Lagomarsino, Pannesi, Boasi and Tasso, with numerous localities. For example, there are Tassorello, Tasso Alto, Sotto Tasso...

=== India ===
In different states of India, there are different words for hamlet. In Haryana and Rajasthan, it is called "dhani" (Hindi: ढाणी ḍhāṇī) or "Thok". In Gujarat, a hamlet is called a "nesada", which are more prevalent in the Gir forest. In Maharashtra, it is called a "pada". In southern Bihar, especially in the Magadh division, a hamlet is called a "bigha". In the state of Karnataka, a hamlet is known by different names like Palya, Hadi (Haadi), Keri, and Padi (Paadi). In the olden days, the human population of hamlet was less than Halli (Village) or Ooru (Uru). But in the 20th century with the tremendous increase in population, some of these hamlets became villages, towns and cities or merged with them.

=== Indonesia ===
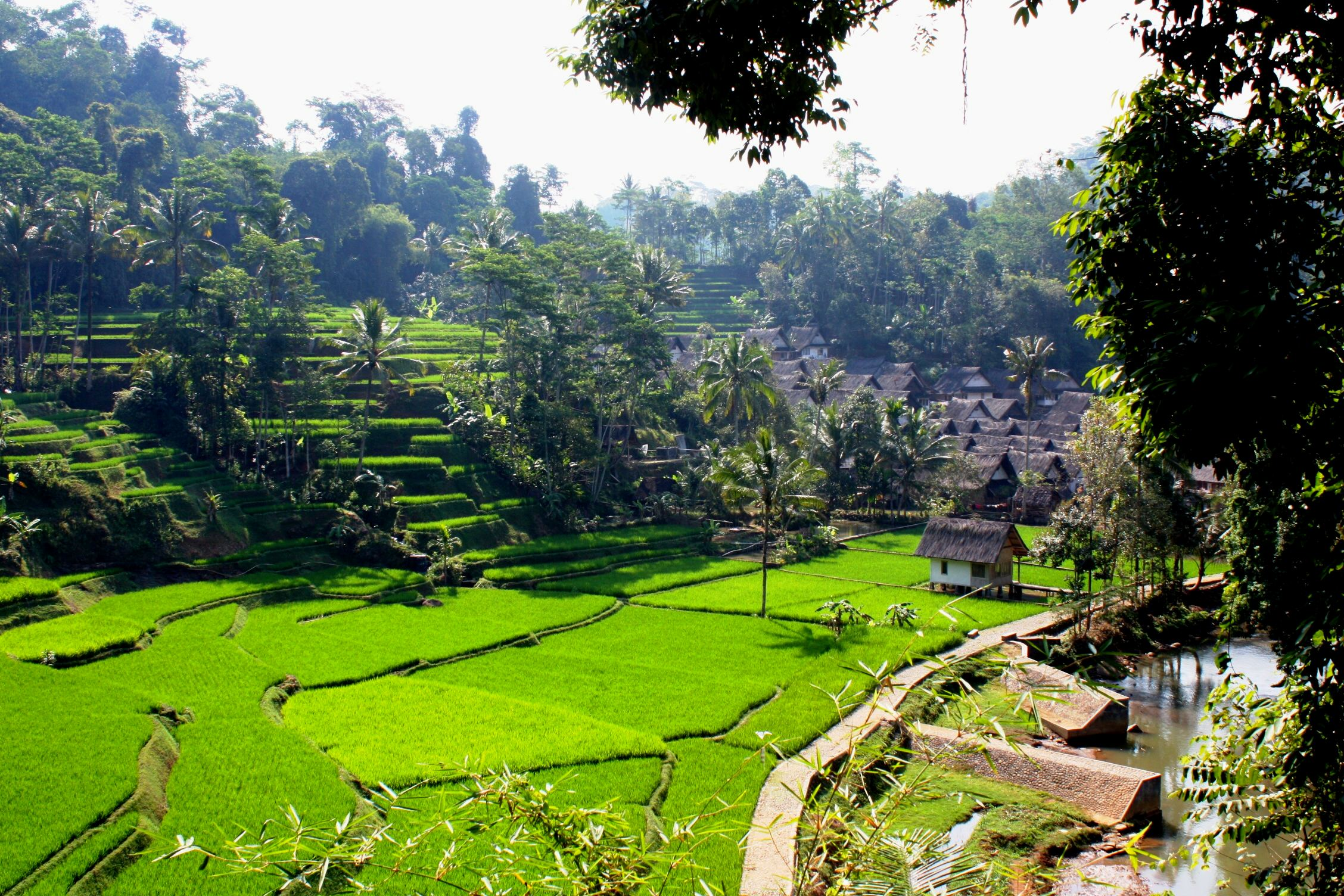
The hamlet Kampung Naga in West Java Province, Indonesia

All over Indonesia, hamlets are translated as "small village", desa or kampung. They are known as dusun in Central Java and East Java, banjar in Bali, jorong or kampuang in West Sumatra.

=== Netherlands ===
The Dutch words for hamlet are gehucht or buurtschap. A gehucht or buurtschap has, compared to a dorp (Town), no infrastructure (i.e. no inn, no school, no store) and contains often only one street, bearing the same name. The houses and farms of a gehucht or a buurtschap can be scattered. Though there are strong similarities between a gehucht and buurtschap, the words are not interchangeable. A gehucht officially counts as an independent place of residence (e.g. Wateren), while a buurtschap officially is a part of another place (e.g. Bartlehiem, part of Wyns).

=== Pakistan ===
In Pakistan, a hamlet is called a gaaon گاؤں or mauza موضع in Urdu, giraaan گراں or pind پنڈ in Punjabi, and kalay کلې in Pashto. It is almost synonymous with 'village'.

=== Poland ===
In Poland, the law recognises several different kinds of rural settlements. Przysiółek (which can be translated as "hamlet") refers to a cluster of farms. Osada (which is typically translated as "settlement" but also can be translated as "hamlet") includes smaller settlements especially differing by type of buildings or inhabited by population connected with some place or workplace (like mill settlements, forest settlements, fishing settlements, railway settlements, former State Agricultural Farm settlements). They can be an independent settlement, or a part of another settlement, like a village.

=== Romania ===
In Romania, hamlets are called cătune (singular: cătun), and they represent villages that contain several houses at most. They are legally considered villages, and statistically, they are placed in the same category. Like villages, they do not have a separate administration, and thus are not an administrative division, but are part of a parent commune.

=== Spain ===
In Spain, a hamlet is called lugar, aldea, pedanía or cortijada (Spanish: [koɾtiˈxaða]). The word comes from the Spanish term cortijo («estate»). In the South of Spain, the term caserío (Spanish: [kaseˈɾi.o]) is also used for designating small groups of rural dwellings or farmhouses.

A hamlet in Spain is a human settlement, usually located in rural areas, and typically smaller in size and population than a village (called in Spain, pueblo Spanish: [ˈpweβlo]). The hamlet is a common territorial organisation in the North West of Spain (Asturias, Cantabria and Galicia) dependent on a larger entity (e.g. parish or municipality).

In Spain, the hamlet is one of the categories in the official gazetteer of population entities. In the Royal Order and Instruction of the 8 of March 1930, issued for the elaboration of the Annual gazetteer, the hamlet (aldea) is defined as the population entity with the smallest population and neighbourhood, usually more disseminated than the lugar, though its buildings can be also organised in streets and plazas.

=== Switzerland ===
In the four national languages, hamlets are known as Weiler (German), hameaux (French), frazioni (Italian) and fracziun (Romansh). A hamlet is always part of a larger municipality or may be shared between two municipalities. The difference between a hamlet and a village is that typically a hamlet lacks a compact core settlement and lacks a central building such as a church or inn. However, some hamlets (Kirchwiler) may have grown up as an unplanned settlement around a church. No population limit defines a hamlet and some hamlets have a larger population than some of the smallest municipalities. Generally, there are no street names in a hamlet; rather, addresses are given by hamlet name and a number. House numbers might start at one side of the hamlet and continue to the other side or may have no clear organization.

A hamlet may form or have formed a Bürgergemeinde (legal place of citizenship regardless of where a person was born or currently lives) and may own common property for the Bürgergemeinde.

=== United Kingdom ===
==== England ====
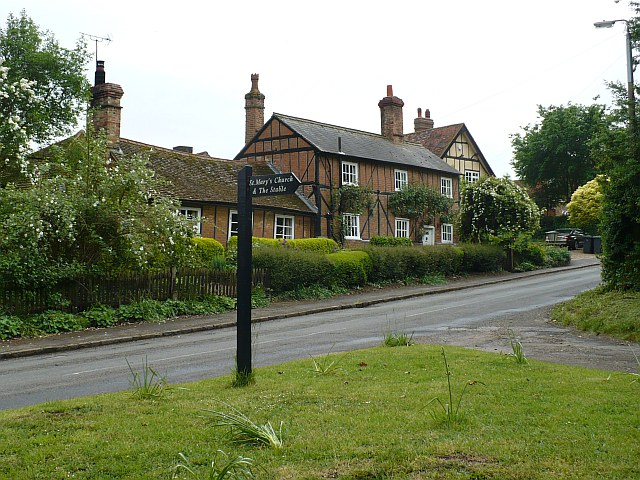
Haynes Church End in Bedfordshire

In England, the word hamlet (having the French origin given at the top of this article) means (in current usage) simply a small settlement, maybe of a few houses or farms, smaller than a village. However, traditionally and legally, it means a village or a town without a church, although hamlets are recognised as part of land use planning policies and administration. Historically, it may refer to a secondary settlement in a civil parish, after the main settlement (if any); such an example is the hamlet of Chipping which is the secondary settlement within the civil parish of Buckland. Hamlets may have been formed around a single source of economic activity such as a farm, mill, mine or harbour that employed its working population. Some hamlets may be the result of the depopulation of a village; examples of such a hamlet are Graby and Shapwick. Because of the hilly topography of the parish, the village of Clent, situated on the Clent Hills, consists of five distinct hamlets.

==== Northern Ireland ====
In Northern Ireland, the common Irish place name element baile is sometimes considered equivalent to the term hamlet in English, baile would actually have referred to what is known in English today as a townland: that is to say, a geographical locality rather than a small village.

==== Scotland ====
In the Scottish Highlands, the term clachan, of Gaelic derivation, may be preferred to the term hamlet. Also found in Scotland more generally is ferm toun, used in the specific case of a farm settlement, including outbuildings and agricultural workers' homes.

==== Wales ====
The term hamlet was used in Wales to denote a geographical subdivision of a parish (which might or might not contain a settlement). Elsewhere, mostly in England, these subdivisions were called townships or tithings. The Welsh word for hamlet is pentrefan (also pentrefyn). Both these words are diminutives of pentref ('village') with the loose meaning of 'small village'.

=== United States ===
==== Mississippi ====
In Mississippi, a 2009 state law (§ 17-27-5) set aside the term "municipal historical hamlet" to designate any former city, town, or village with a current population of less than 600 inhabitants that lost its charter before 1945. The first such designation was applied to Bogue Chitto, Lincoln County.

==== New York ====
In New York, hamlets are unincorporated settlements within towns. Hamlets are not legal entities and have no local government or official boundaries. Their approximate locations will often be noted on road signs, however, a specific service, such as water, sewer, or lighting provides only that hamlet with services. A hamlet could be described as the rural or suburban equivalent of a neighborhood in a city or village. The area of a hamlet may not be exactly defined; it may be designated by the Census Bureau, or it may rely on some other form of border (such as a ZIP Code, school district or fire district for more urbanized areas; rural hamlets are typically only demarcated by speed zones on the roads serving them). Others, such as Forestville, New York, will be the remnants of formerly incorporated villages, with borders coextant with the previously defined borders of the defunct or dissolved village. Some hamlets proximate to urban areas are sometimes continuous with their cities and appear to be neighborhoods, but they still are under the administrative jurisdiction of the overall town rather than the city. Some localities designated as hamlets, such as Levittown in the Town of Hempstead, with a population of over 50,000, are more populous than some incorporated cities in the state.

==== Oregon ====
In Oregon, specifically in Clackamas County, a hamlet is a form of local government for small communities that allows the citizens therein to organize and coordinate community activities. Hamlets do not provide services, such as utilities or fire protection, and do not have the authority to levy taxes or fees. As of 2026, Clackamas County recognizes three hamlets: Beavercreek, Mulino, and Stafford.

== See also ==
- Developed environments
- Dhani and villages
- Frazione
- Manorialism
- Types of inhabited localities in Russia
