= Standon Calling =

Music festival in Hertfordshire, England

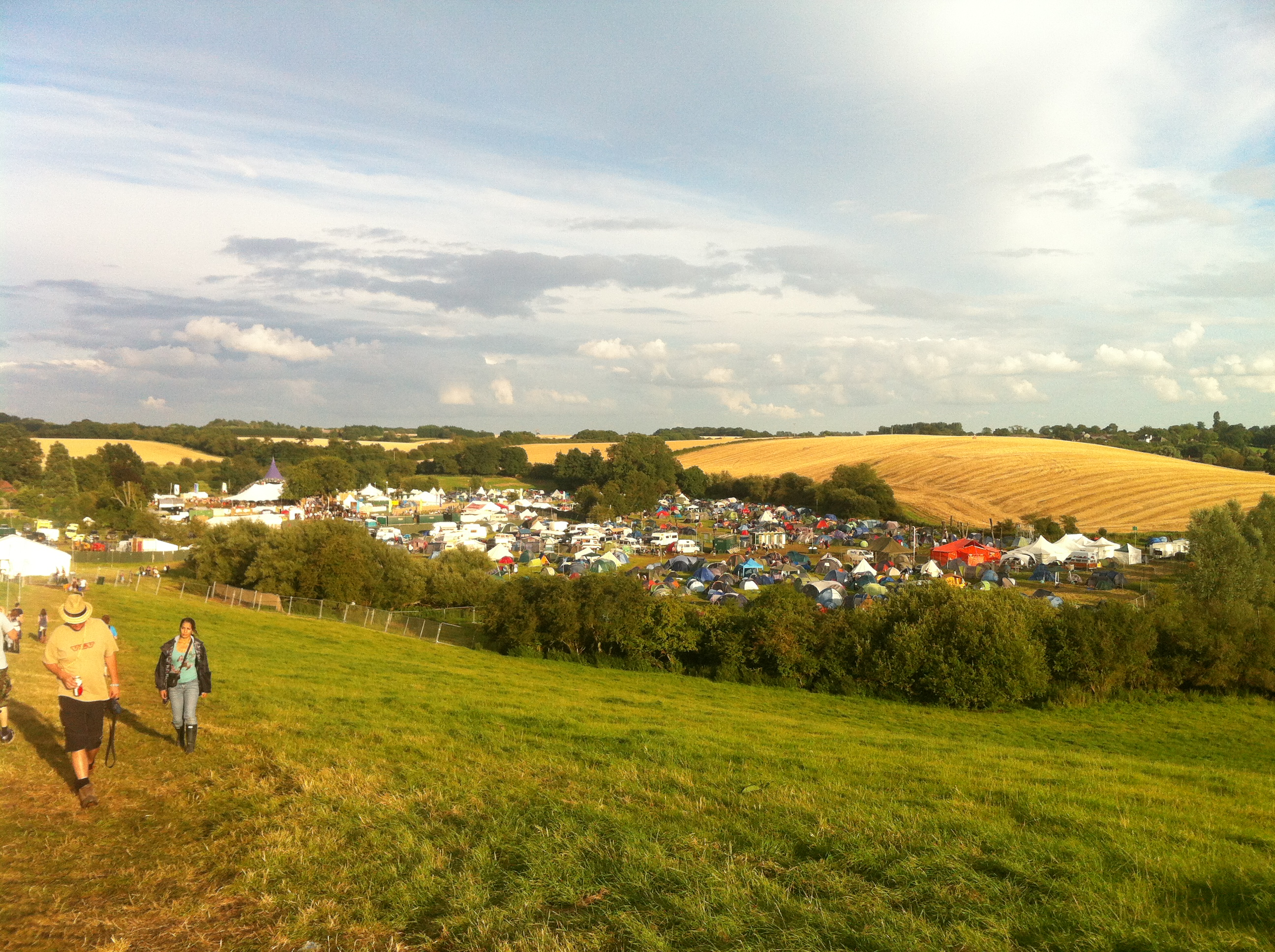
- Standon Calling in 2012
- Location: Standon, Hertfordshire
- Years active: 2001-2023
- Website: www.standon-calling.com

Standon Calling was an annual music festival held near the village of Standon, Hertfordshire, United Kingdom, in the grounds of private residence Standon Lordship. It is a themed boutique festival which grew from a birthday barbecue into an annual public event.

== History ==
The festival began as a birthday barbecue for founder Alex Trenchard in 2001. It became a live music event in 2004, with a single stage on the same site with a one-day line-up.

In 2005, a second stage was built in an adjacent field; after the final act, organiser Trenchard announced to visitors "Don't go to bed!". Performers dressed as fairies, who were hidden in the crowd, threw off their cloaks and led the festival-goers to a surprise all-night party.

The festival expanded to two days in 2006 with a full-size main stage.

2007 saw a Rio Carnival theme and the blossoming of another festival tradition, fancy dress on Saturday. Headliners were The Rumble Strips, New Young Pony Club, Noisettes and Mr Hudson & The Library. Friendly Fires also played the main stage on Saturday afternoon.

In 2008 the festival expanded to three full days, with the Super Furry Animals closing the main stage. Other acts included Florence & The Machine, The Maccabees, Glasvegas, Late Of The Pier, and Dan Le Sac Vs Scroobius Pip.

The theme was Japanese culture, with outfits varying from Harajuku girls to Wasabi peas. Japanese acts included Melt Banana, Acid Mother's Temple and Cosmic Inferno, while activities included calligraphy demonstrations, tea tastings and binocular football.

There was even an underwater disco, which won Standon Calling the Innovation Award at 2008's UK Festival Awards.

In 2009 the theme was "Space", commemorating the 40th anniversary of the Apollo 11 Moon landings. The festival site was duly decorated with props including a Tardis from cult BBC sci-fi serial Doctor Who and the DeLorean time machine from the Back to the Future film trilogy. There were several space-related events, including two evening presentations by space expert Jerry Stone of Spaceflight UK.

=== 2010s ===
2010 saw Standon Calling grow, both in terms of space and ticket sales. Themed around "Murder On The Standon Express", a miniature town with boutique stores, food stands and a fancy dress shop was built on the site.

The festival spread from Standon Lordship onto neighbouring fields with additional car parking and camping. Coach travel provided from local train stations. The pre-festival marketing included a series of "Road to Standon Calling" gigs in London and a competition for smaller upcoming bands to play the main stage on the Sunday night.

2011's theme was 'Gods and Monsters' with Lamb and Battles headlining.

2012's theme 'Journey to the end of the earth' saw headliners Fat Freddies Drop, Beardy Man and Death in Vegas.

2013's theme of 'Running away from the circus' included bands Bastille, Digitalism, The Joy Formidable, De La Soul and Band of Skulls.

2014 had a "Lost in Latin America" theme with headliners Frank Turner, Maximo Park and Public Enemy. Clean Bandit, Charli XCX, Ella Eyre and Young Fathers were other notable names on the lineup.

Celebrating its 10th birthday, Standon Calling increased its capacity to 10,000 in 2015. The theme was "A town of two faces", encouraging cowboy/girl costumes by day and by night the festival took a futuristic turn seeing a variety of disco themed costumes. Disco tribute band Uncle Funk & The Boogie Wonderband opened the main stage. Headlining the festival were Little Dragon, The Dandy Warhols and Basement Jaxx with other acts such as Ella Eyre, Slaves and Kwabs filling the bill.

=== 2020s ===
In common with all UK festivals, Standon Calling 2020 was cancelled due to the COVID-19 pandemic, with tickets being refunded or rolled over to the following year. The event returned in 2021, though the final day of that year's festival was shut down early due to poor weather conditions.

=== Demise ===
Standon Calling took place for the seventeenth and final time in 2023. Due to financial losses sustained by the event, plans for a 2024 festival - arranged as an eight-day event across two weekends - were scrapped. Some performers and service providers reported that they had not received monies due from the 2023 event. In October 2025 it was confirmed that the firm behind the festival had gone into liquidation and Standon Calling would not return.

=== Conviction ===
In February 2011, founder Alex Trenchard received a 30-month sentence for defrauding his employer Tesco of £355,000, which he used to fund the event using his company credit card. This followed losses on ticket sales during the 2008 and 2009 events. Trenchard was released after 10 months.
