= Smokeless Powder Company =

In 1888 the 'Smokeless Powder Company', owned by James Dalziel Dougall Junior, the son of the famous glaswegian gunsmith -J D Dougall, took a 99-year lease for 126 arces around 'The Outpost', from the Youngsbury Estate. The site's name was changed from 'The Outpost' to Barwick and Barwick was formed as a 'factory hamlet'.

The 'factory hamlet' was designed and superintend by the company's engineer Ernest Spon A.I.C.E. Mr Ernest Spon was well known for his civil engineering books, such as 'Workshop Receipts' and 'The Present Practice of Sinking and Boring Wells...'

The Smokeless Powder Company (S.P.C.) manufactured various high explosive powders for use in torpedoes, artillery shells, small arms ammunition (for the military and sporting) and mine blasting. The 'Smokeless Powder Company' was a world leader in its high explosive powders. S.P.C had over 100 employees at the factory.

On 26 May 1893, there was an explosion & fire in one of the drying houses. As a result, company employees Mr A Aylott & Mr A Ginn both died in this incident[4] The accident was thoroughly investigated by H.M. Chief Inspector of Explosives - Colonel V.D.Majendie C.B; on 20 June 1893.

In 1896 the Smokeless Powder Company, was purchased by the New Schultze Gunpowder Company Limited, located at Eyeworth, Fritham, Hampshire.[5] As a result of this sale, the company was renamed the Smokeless Powder & Ammunition Company Limited in 1896. The company had two of Great Britain's greatest ballistics' experts working for it - Mr F W Jones & Mr R W S Griffith. The Smokeless Powder & Ammunition Company continued to produce high explosive powders until it ceased trading in circa 1910.
