= St Andrew's Church, Buckland =

Coordinates: 51.9866°N 0.0232°W

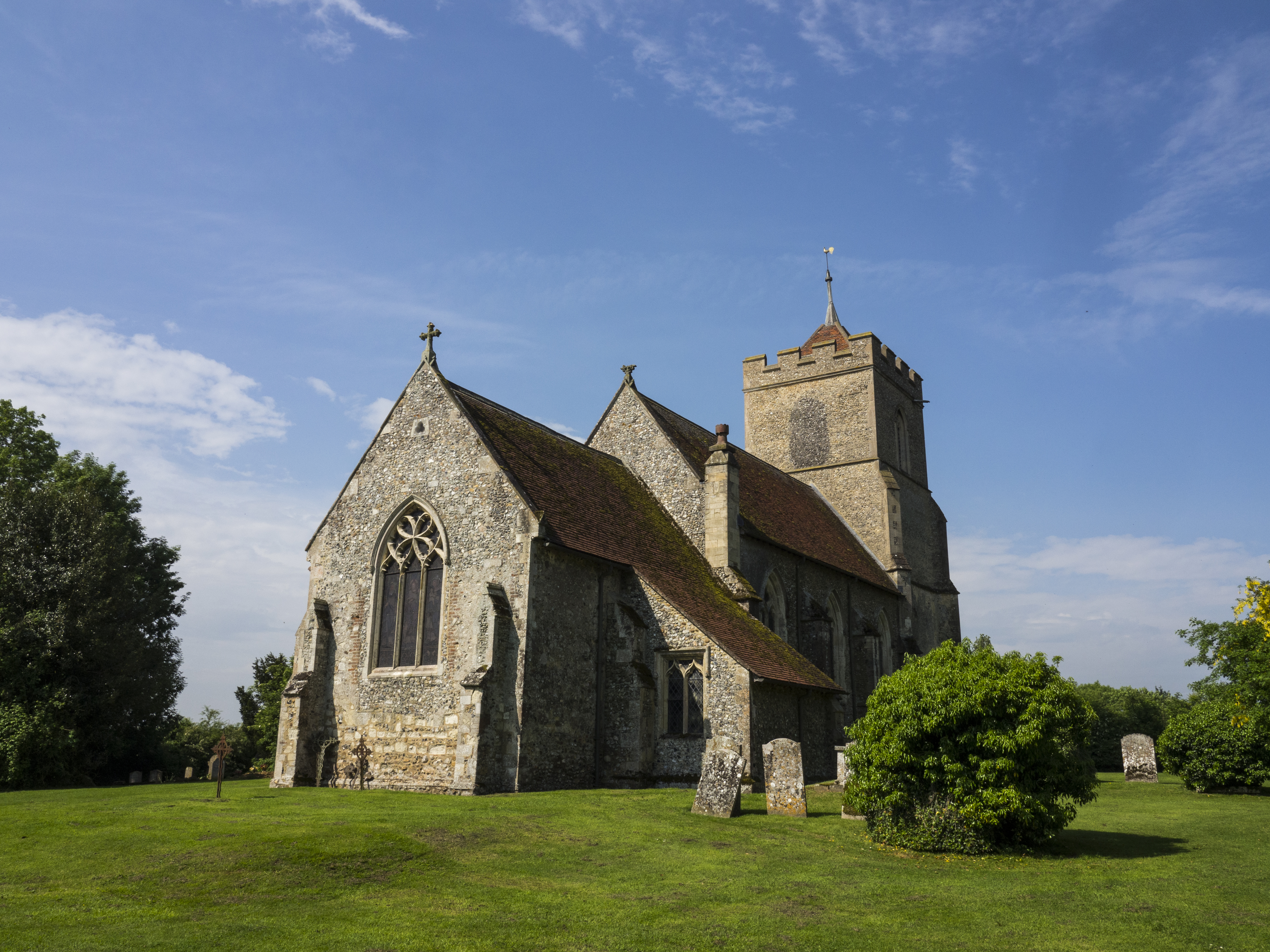
- St Andrew's Church, Buckland, from the south-west

- Location in Hertfordshire
- OS grid reference: TL 359 339
- Location: Buckland, Hertfordshire
- Country: England
- Denomination: Anglican
- Website: Churches Conservation Trust

History
- Dedication: Saint Andrew

Architecture
- Functional status: Redundant
- Heritage designation: Grade II*
- Designated: 22 February 1967
- Architectural type: Church
- Style: Gothic
- Groundbreaking: c. 1348

Specifications
- Materials: Flint with stone dressings Tiled roofs

St Andrew's Church is a redundant Anglican church in the village of Buckland, Hertfordshire, England. It is recorded in the National Heritage List for England as a designated Grade II* listed building, and is under the care of the Churches Conservation Trust. The church stands at the highest point in the village to the east of Ermine Street, now the A10 road, between Royston and Buntingford.

== History ==
The nave and chancel were built in about 1348. The tower was added in about 1400, and the south aisle and south porch followed in the late 15th century. Restorations took place in 1848 and 1875. In about 1880 a vestry and organ chamber were added, and the exteriors of the nave and aisle were restored in 1893.

== Architecture ==
=== Exterior ===
The church is constructed in flint with stone dressings. The roofs are in red tiles. Its plan consists of a narrow three-bay nave with a broad south aisle and a south porch, a two-bay chancel with a vestry and organ chamber to the north, and a large west tower. The tower is set on a moulded plinth. It is in three stages separated by string courses, with diagonal buttresses, and a battlemented parapet. In the bottom stage is a west doorway with a pointed arch, above which is a two-light window. The bell openings in the top stage have two lights. On the summit of the tower is a pyramidal spire. In the north wall of the nave are three two-light 14th-century windows and a 15th-century blocked doorway. The east window in the chancel has three lights dating from the 19th century in 15th-century style. In the south wall of the chancel are two two-light 14th-century windows, with a doorway from the same period between them. The south aisle has three-light 15th-century windows, two in the south wall, and one each in each of the east and west walls. The south porch has diagonal buttresses, and two-light windows on each side. Over the entrance arch is a niche with a cinquefoil arch.

=== Interior ===
Both the nave and the chancel have 19th-century waggon roofs. Between the nave and south aisle is a three-bay arcade. The aisle has an almost flat timber roof dating from the 15th century, and contains bosses with foliate carving. In the aisle is a piscina with a trefoil head. The chancel is floored with encaustic tiles. Its north arch is decorated with carvings of angel musicians. The font is made from Barnack stone set on a clunch base. The wooden pulpit dates from the 19th century. Also from that century are four boards on the north wall of the nave with the Lord's Prayer, the Ten Commandments, and the Creed. There are three groups of brasses on the wall behind the altar with dates in the second half of the 15th century. In the south wall of the aisle is a white alabaster monument dated 1634. The tower contains two monuments dated in the 18th century. In the arcade is a marble tablet in Neoclassical style dated 1861, and in the southwest of the chancel is another marble tablet, this one by Chantrey, dated 1819. There is some medieval stained glass in two of the windows in the nave. The single-manual organ was built in 1870 by Henry Jones and Son.

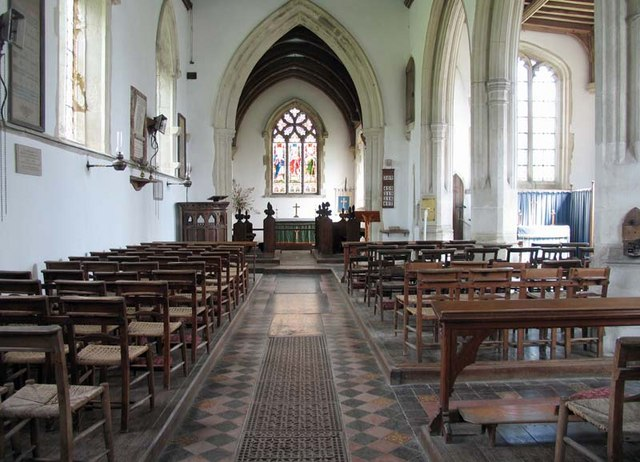
St Andrew's, Buckland - Nave, looking east

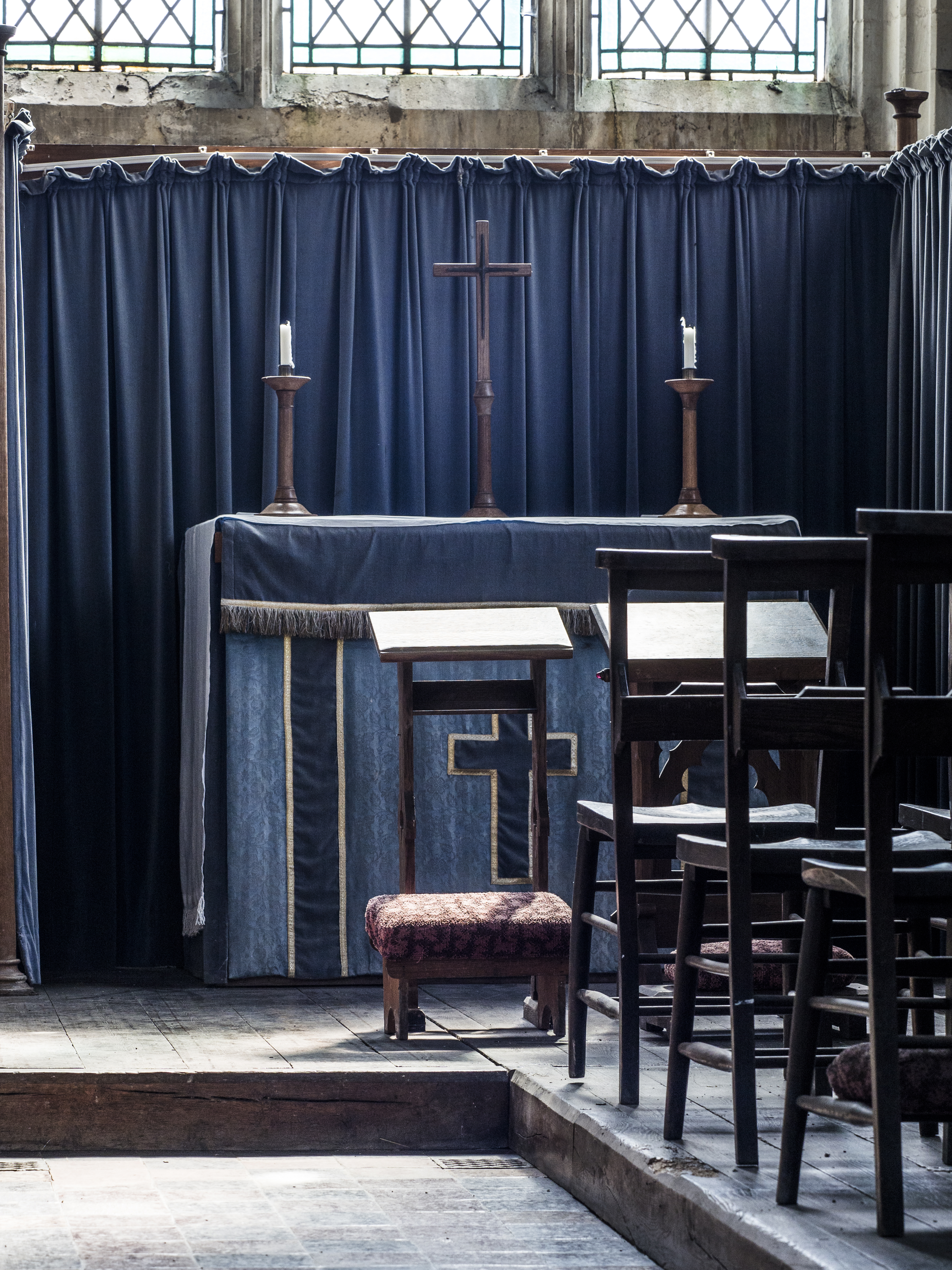
St Andrew's, Buckland - South aisle altar

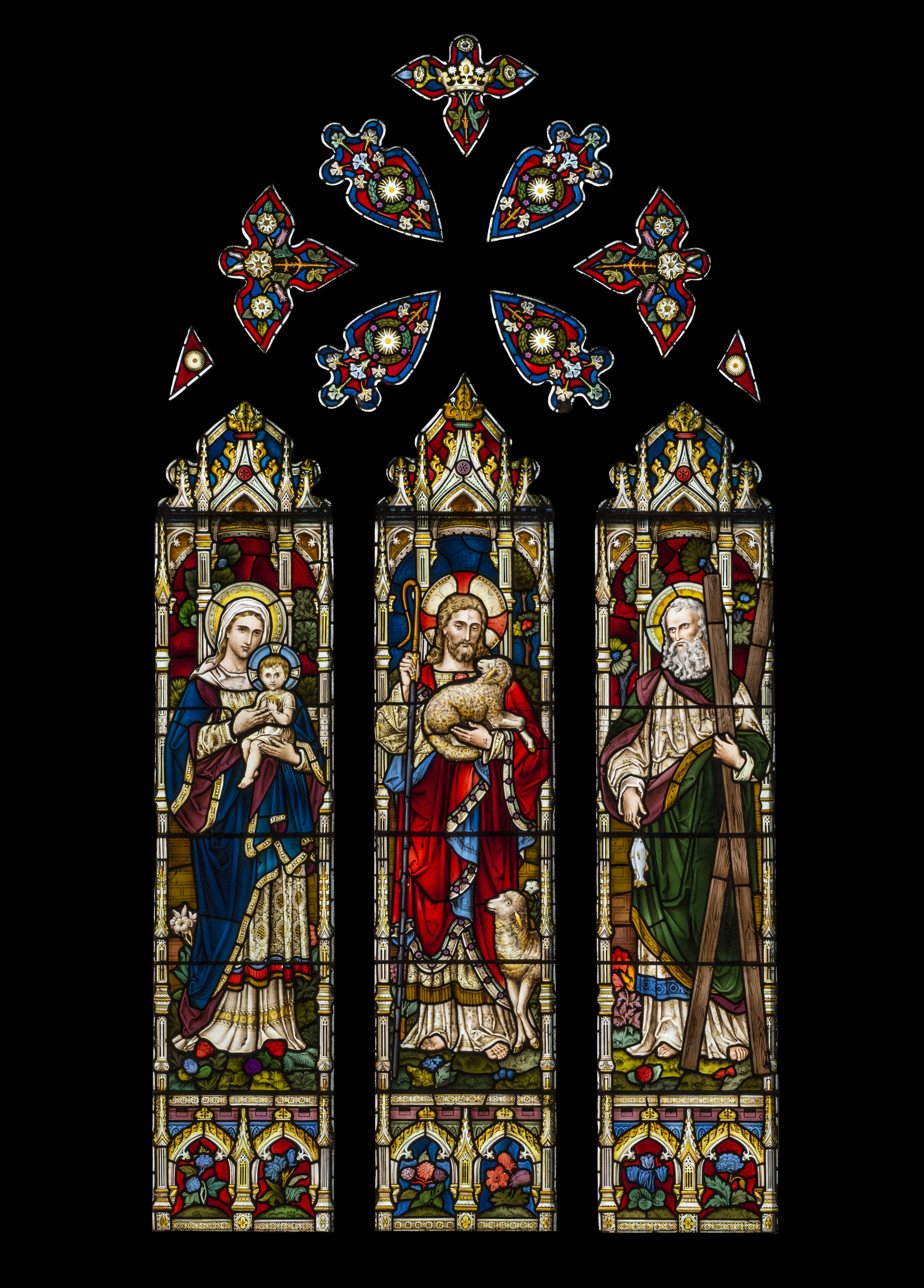
St Andrew's, Buckland - East window by Alexander Gibbs & Co, 1883

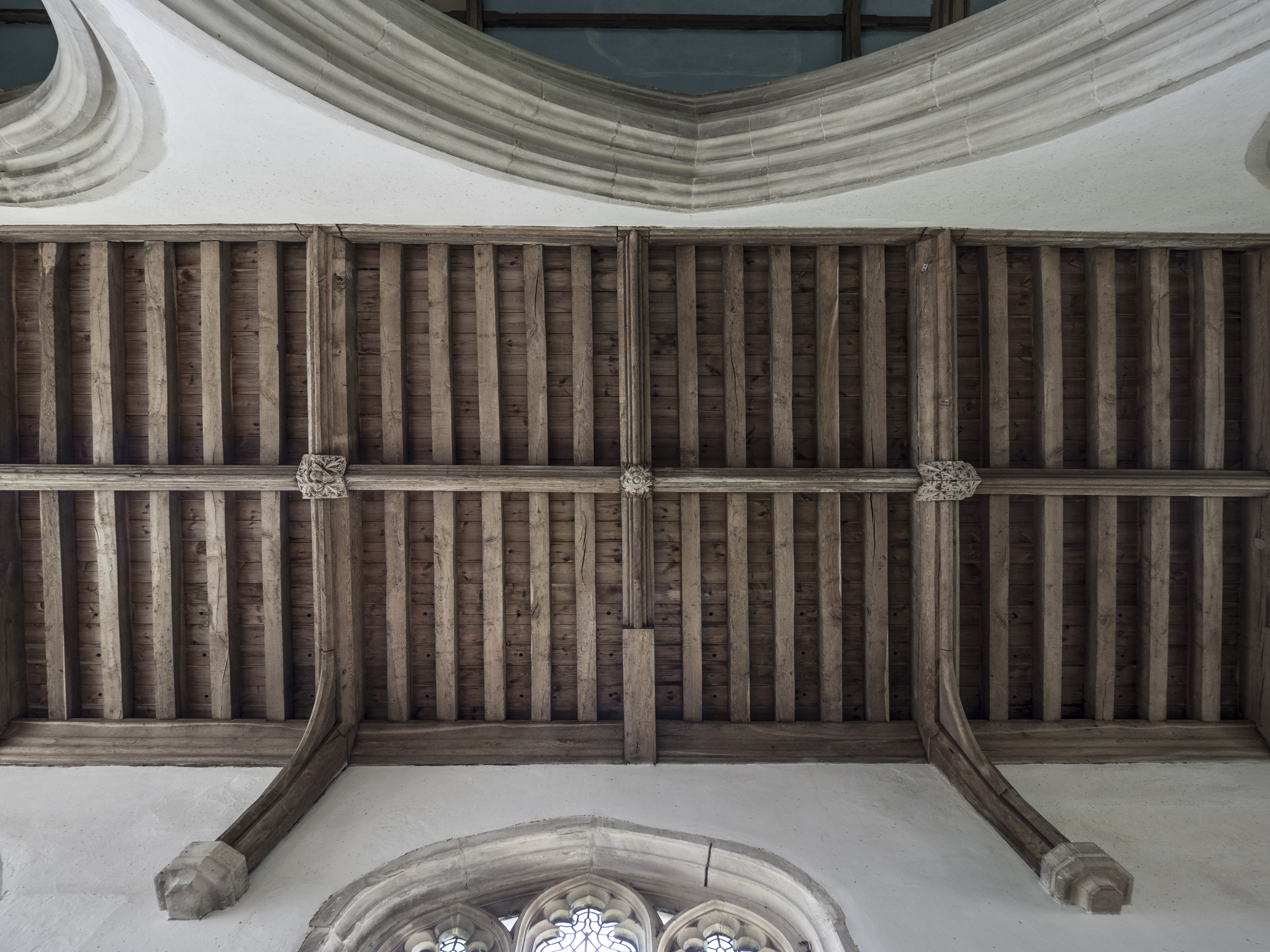
St Andrew's, Buckland - South aisle roof

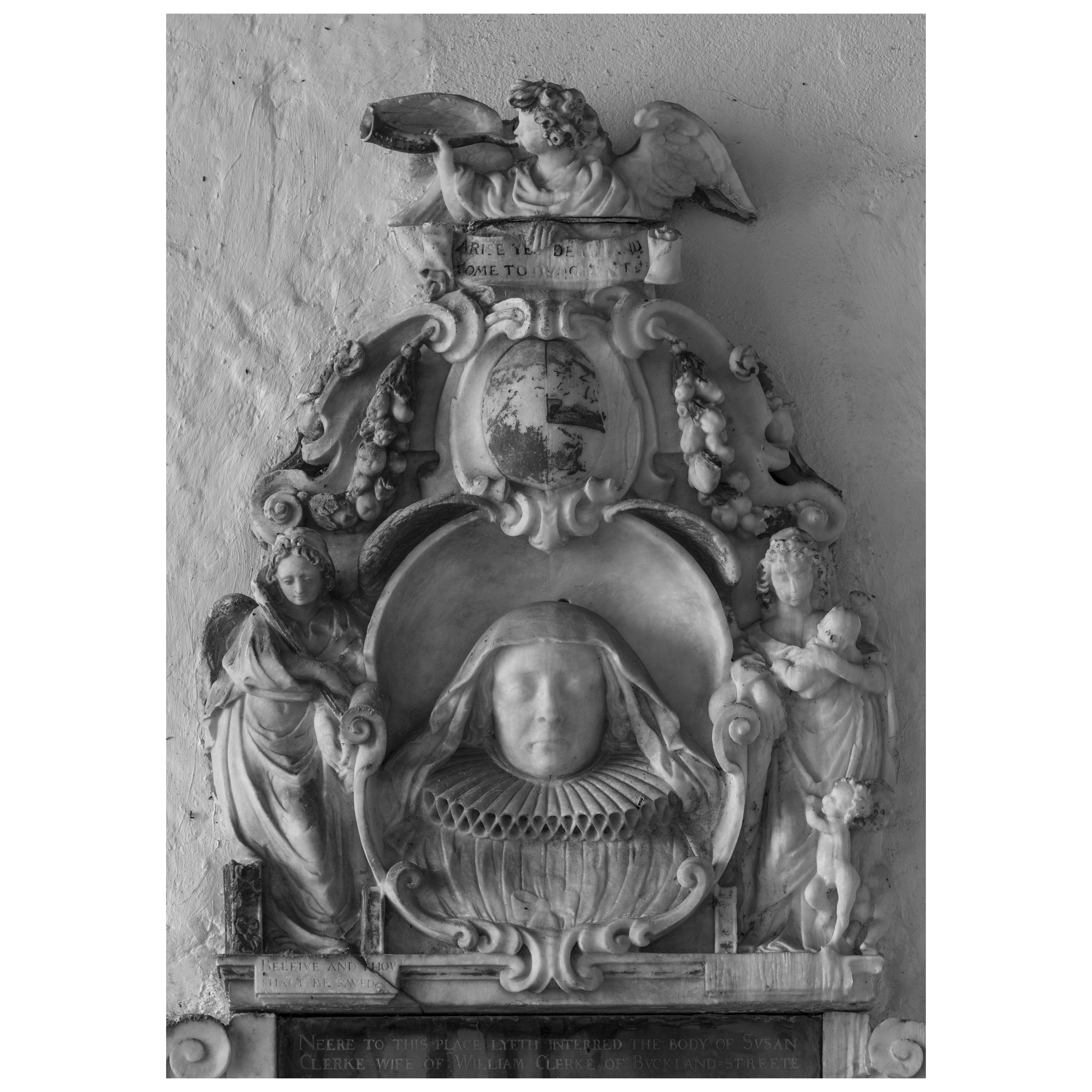
St Andrew's, Buckland - Memorial to Susan Clerke, south aisle

== See also ==
- The Churches Conservation Trust: St Andrew's Church, Buckland
