= Standon, Hertfordshire =

Village in Hertfordshire, England

Coordinates: 51.882659°N 0.02921°E

Standon
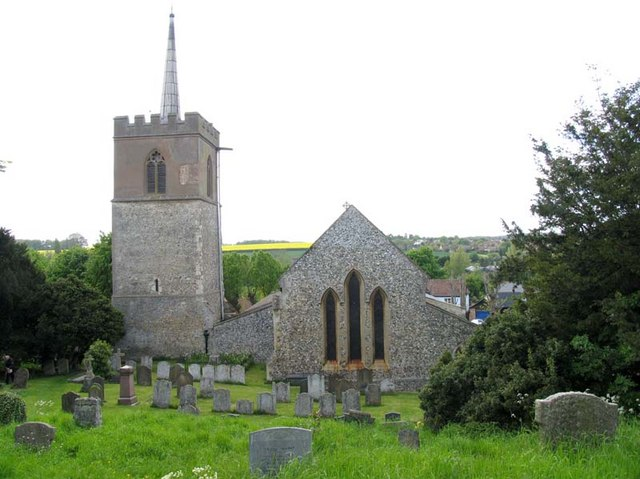
- St Mary's Church, Standon

- Location within Hertfordshire
- Population: 4,675 (Parish, 2021)
- OS grid reference: TL396224
- Civil parish: Standon
- District: East Hertfordshire
- Shire county: Hertfordshire
- Region: East
- Country: England
- Sovereign state: United Kingdom
- Post town: WARE
- Postcode district: SG11
- Dialling code: 01920
- Police: Hertfordshire
- Fire: Hertfordshire
- Ambulance: East of England
- UK Parliament: North East Hertfordshire

Standon is a village and civil parish in the East Hertfordshire district of Hertfordshire, England. The village lies 5.5 miles (9 km) north of Ware, its post town. As well as the village itself, the parish also includes the neighbouring village of Puckeridge, the hamlets of Old Hall Green and Colliers End, and surrounding rural areas. Puckeridge and Standon are now classed as a single built up area by the Office for National Statistics. At the 2021 census, the parish had a population of 4,675.

== History ==
The place-name is first attested in an Anglo-Saxon charter of 944–46 AD and means "stony hill".

The Grade I listed parish church of St Mary has Anglo-Saxon origins with much Victorian restoration of 1864-65 by H. and G. Godwin. The chancel contains the ornate tombs of the Tudor courtier Sir Ralph Sadler and his son Sir Thomas Sadleir. The house Standon Lordship was built by Ralph Sadler on his estate at Standon, which he acquired in 1544; Standon remained in the possession of the Sadler family until the death of Sadler's grandson Ralph in 1661.

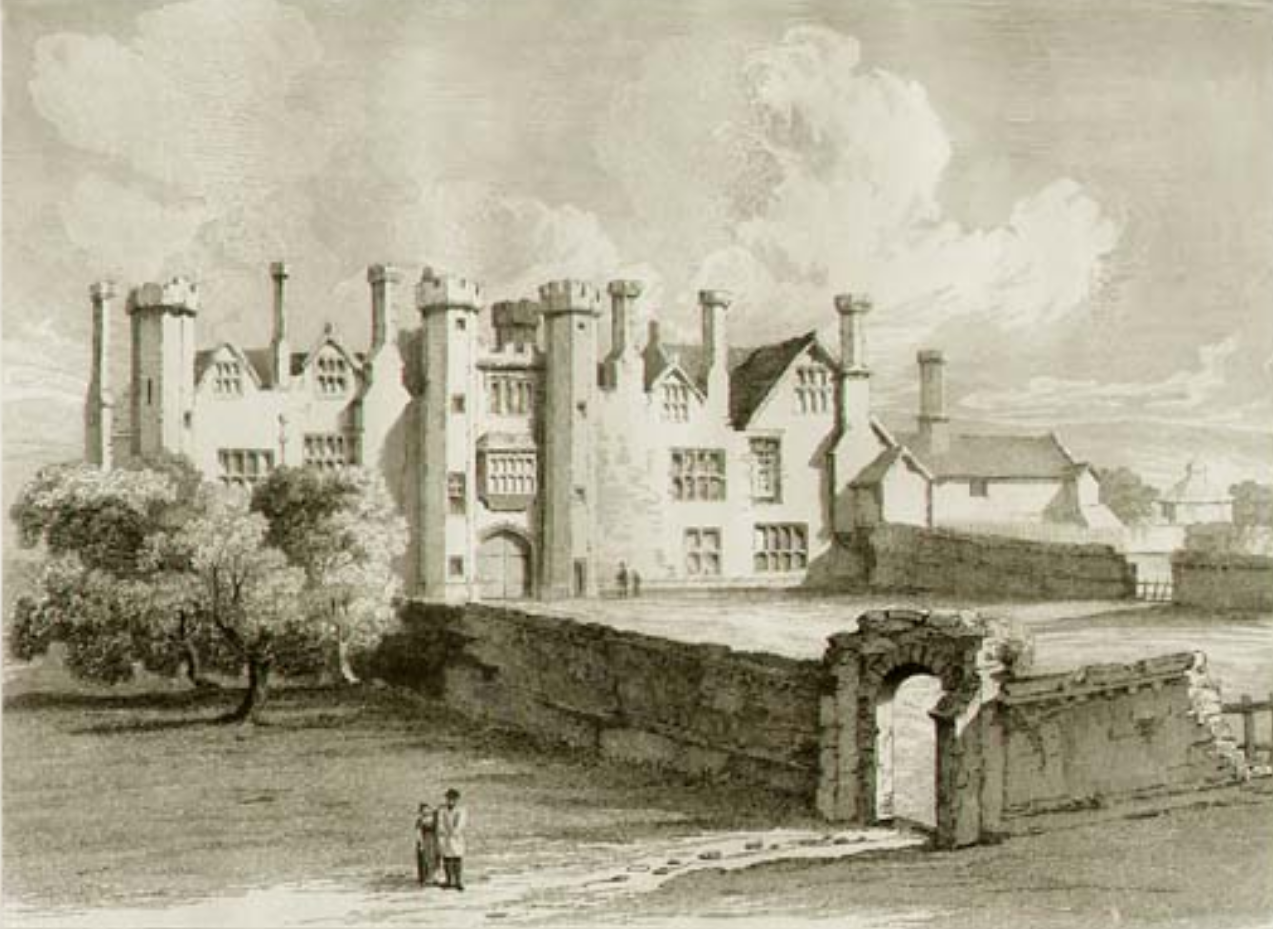
Standon Lordship drawn by Robert Clutterbuck and etched by Edward Blore for History and Antiquities of the County of Hertford, Vol. 3, (1827)

Standon railway station was a stop on the Buntingford branch line, which opened in 1863 and closed in 1965.

The parish historically included Wadesmill and nearby High Cross. Wadesmill was transferred to the parish of Thundridge in 1952. High Cross was subsequently also transferred to Thundridge in 1990.

Arthur Martin-Leake, one of only three men to be awarded the Victoria Cross twice, was born in the village.

== Geography ==
Standon village has many local facilities. In addition to the church, there is a village hall, two public houses, a Chinese restaurant, post office, butcher, baker, and newsagent. Villagers also make frequent use of facilities in neighbouring Puckeridge, which include a pharmacy, estate agent, petrol station, public houses, doctor's surgery and primary schools (including St Thomas of Canterbury, a Roman Catholic primary school).

The Prime Meridian passes to the west of Standon.

The Standon Calling music festival is held in the village.

Standon features in the novel The House on Boulby Cliff (2020) by Kevin Corby Bowyer, former organist of St Mary's Church.

== Population ==
The parish had a population of 4,675 at the 2021 census. The Office for National Statistics also defines a "Puckeridge and Standon" built up area covering those two villages. This built up area had a population of 3,805 in 2021.

== Governance ==
There are three tiers of local government covering Standon, at parish, district, and county level: Standon Parish Council, East Hertfordshire District Council, and Hertfordshire County Council. The parish council generally meets at the Puckeridge Community Centre on Station Road in Puckeridge.

== See also ==
- St Edmund's College, Ware
- Standon Preceptory
- The Hundred Parishes
