= Arthur Martin-Leake =

Recipient of the Victoria Cross

Lieutenant Colonel Arthur Martin-Leake VC & Bar, VD, FRCS
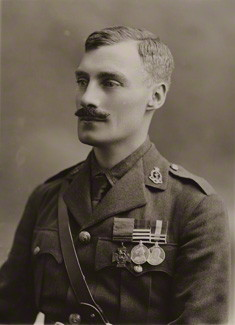
- Arthur Martin-Leake c. 1902
- Born: 4 April 1874; Standon, Hertfordshire, England
- Died: 22 June 1953 (aged 79); High Cross, Hertfordshire, England
- Burial place: St John's Church, High Cross
- Education: Westminster School
- Military career
- Allegiance: United Kingdom
- Branch: British Army
- Service years: 1899–1902; 1914–1918
- Rank: Lieutenant Colonel
- Units: Imperial Yeomanry; South African Constabulary; Royal Army Medical Corps
- Commands: 46th Field Ambulance
- Conflicts: Second Boer War; First World War
- Awards: Victoria Cross & Bar; Mentioned in Despatches; Colonial Auxiliary Forces Officers' Decoration

Lieutenant Colonel Arthur Martin-Leake, VC & Bar, VD, FRCS (4 April 1874 – 22 June 1953) was an English physician, officer in the Royal Army Medical Corps and a double recipient of the Victoria Cross (VC), the highest award for gallantry in the face of the enemy that can be awarded to British and Commonwealth forces. Martin-Leake was the first of three men to be awarded the VC twice, the others being Noel Godfrey Chavasse and Charles Upham.

== Early life ==
Arthur, the fifth son of Stephen Martin-Leake of Thorpe Hall, Essex, was born at Standon, near Ware, Hertfordshire, and was educated at Westminster School before studying medicine at University College Hospital, qualifying in 1893. He was employed at Hemel Hempstead District Hospital before enlisting in the 42nd (Hertfordshire) Company, Imperial Yeomanry in 1899 to serve in the Boer War.

== Boer War ==
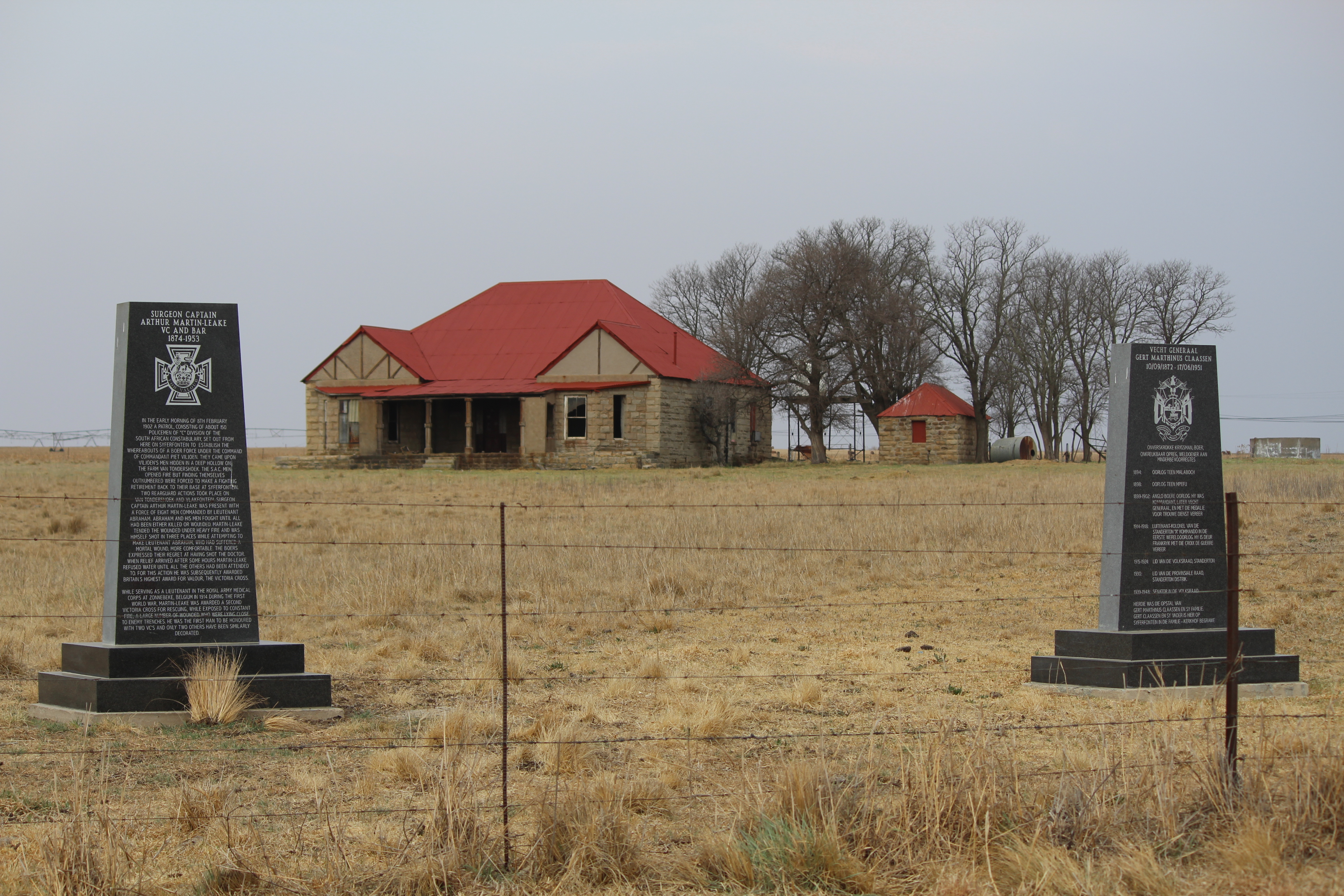
Monument (at left) commemorating Martin-Leake, farm Syferfontein, South Africa

After his year of service as a trooper in the Imperial Yeomanry was completed, Martin-Leake stayed on in South Africa as a civil surgeon. He then joined the South African Constabulary until he was forced to return home due to his wounds.

He was 27 years old and a surgeon captain in the South African Constabulary attached to the 5th Field Ambulance during the Second Boer War on 8 February 1902, at Vlakfontein, when he was awarded his first VC.

During the action at Vlakfontein, on the 8th February, 1902, Surgeon-Captain Martin-Leake went up to a wounded man, and attended to him under a heavy fire from about 40 Boers at 100 yards range. He then went to the assistance of a wounded Officer, and, whilst trying to place him in a comfortable position, was shot three times, but would not give in till he rolled over thoroughly exhausted. All the eight men at this point were wounded, and while they were lying on the Veldt, Surgeon-Captain Martin-Leake refused water till every one else had been served.

He received the decoration from King Edward VII at St James's Palace on 2 June 1902.

== Interbellum ==
Martin-Leake qualified as a Fellow of the Royal College of Surgeons in 1903 after studying while convalescing from wounds. He then took up an appointment in India as Chief Medical Officer with the Bengal-Nagpur Railway.

In 1912, he volunteered to serve with the British Red Cross during the Balkan Wars, attached to the Montenegrin army, and was present during the Siege of Scutari (1912–13) and at Tarabosh Mountain. He was awarded the Order of the Montenegrin Red Cross.

== First World War ==
On the outbreak of the First World War, Martin-Leake returned to service as a lieutenant with the 5th Field Ambulance, Royal Army Medical Corps, on the Western Front.

He was awarded his second VC, aged 40, during the period 29 October to 8 November 1914 near Zonnebeke, Belgium, whilst serving with the Royal Army Medical Corps, British Army.

His award citation reads:

Lieutenant Arthur Martin Leake, Royal Army Medical Corps, who was awarded the Victoria Cross on 13th May, 1902, is granted a Clasp for conspicuous bravery in the present campaign: — For most conspicuous bravery and devotion to duty throughout the campaign, especially during the period 29th October to 8th November, 1914, near Zonnebeke, in rescuing, whilst exposed to constant fire, a large number of the wounded who were lying close to the enemy's trenches.

His Victoria Cross is displayed at the Army Medical Services Museum, Aldershot, England.

He was promoted captain in March 1915, major in November the same year, and in April 1917 took command of 46th Field Ambulance at the rank of lieutenant colonel.

== Postwar ==
Martin-Leake retired from the army after the war and resumed his company employment in India until he retired to England in 1937. Although there is no record of his being a pilot, he was registered in 1939 as the owner of a de Havilland Moth Minor aircraft, registered G-AFRY.

During the Second World War, he commanded an ARP post.

He died on 22 June 1953, aged 79, at High Cross, Hertfordshire. Following cremation at Enfield Crematorium, Middlesex, Martin-Leake was buried in St John's Church, High Cross. He is commemorated with a plaque and a tree at the National Memorial Arboretum in Alrewas, Staffordshire.

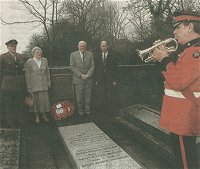
Memorial service at High Cross, Hertfordshire, for Martin-Leake, 2002. Major C.D.V. Bonfield, RAMC, Mrs Sybil Martin-Leake, Mr Hugh Martin-Leake, Major Charles Monk and Trumpeter C/Sergeant Gardner, The Royal Anglian Regiment.
