= High Cross, East Hertfordshire =

Village in Hertfordshire, England, United Kingdom

Coordinates: 51.84892°N 0.02280°W

High Cross
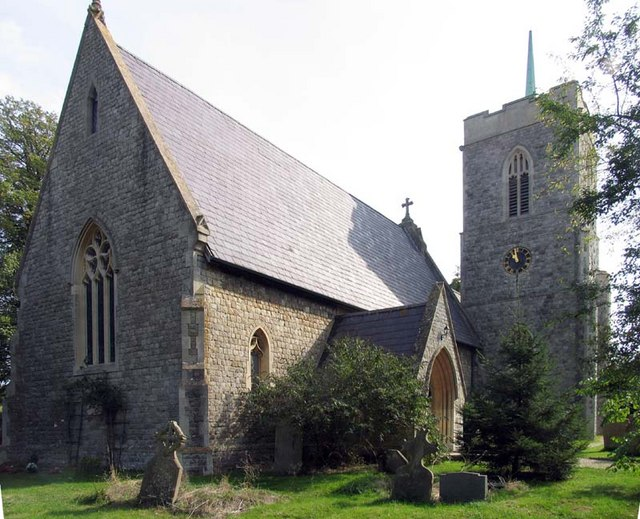

- Location within Hertfordshire
- Area: 0.2795 km^{2} (0.1079 sq mi)
- Population: 853 (2021 census)
  - Density: 3,052/km^{2} (7,900/sq mi)
- Civil parish: Thundridge
- District: East Hertfordshire
- Shire county: Hertfordshire
- Region: East
- Country: England
- Sovereign state: United Kingdom
- Post town: WARE
- Postcode district: SG

High Cross is a village in the civil parish of Thundridge, in the East Hertfordshire district, in Hertfordshire, England. It lies upon what was the A10, however the A10 Wadesmill by-pass has now been built around High Cross and neighbouring villages. Sections of the A10 that used to run through High Cross and the neighbouring settlements such as Wadesmill were once part of the Roman road, Ermine Street. It is 4.6 km (2.9 miles) north of the town of Ware and 7 km (4 miles) north east of the county town of Hertford. The population was 853 as of the 2021 census.

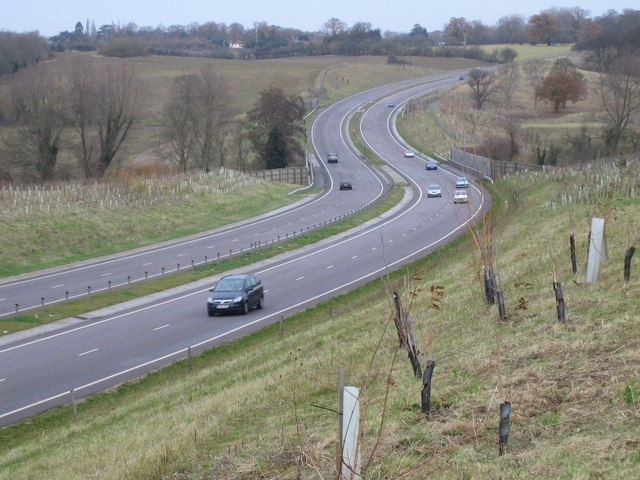
A10 Wadesmill Bypass

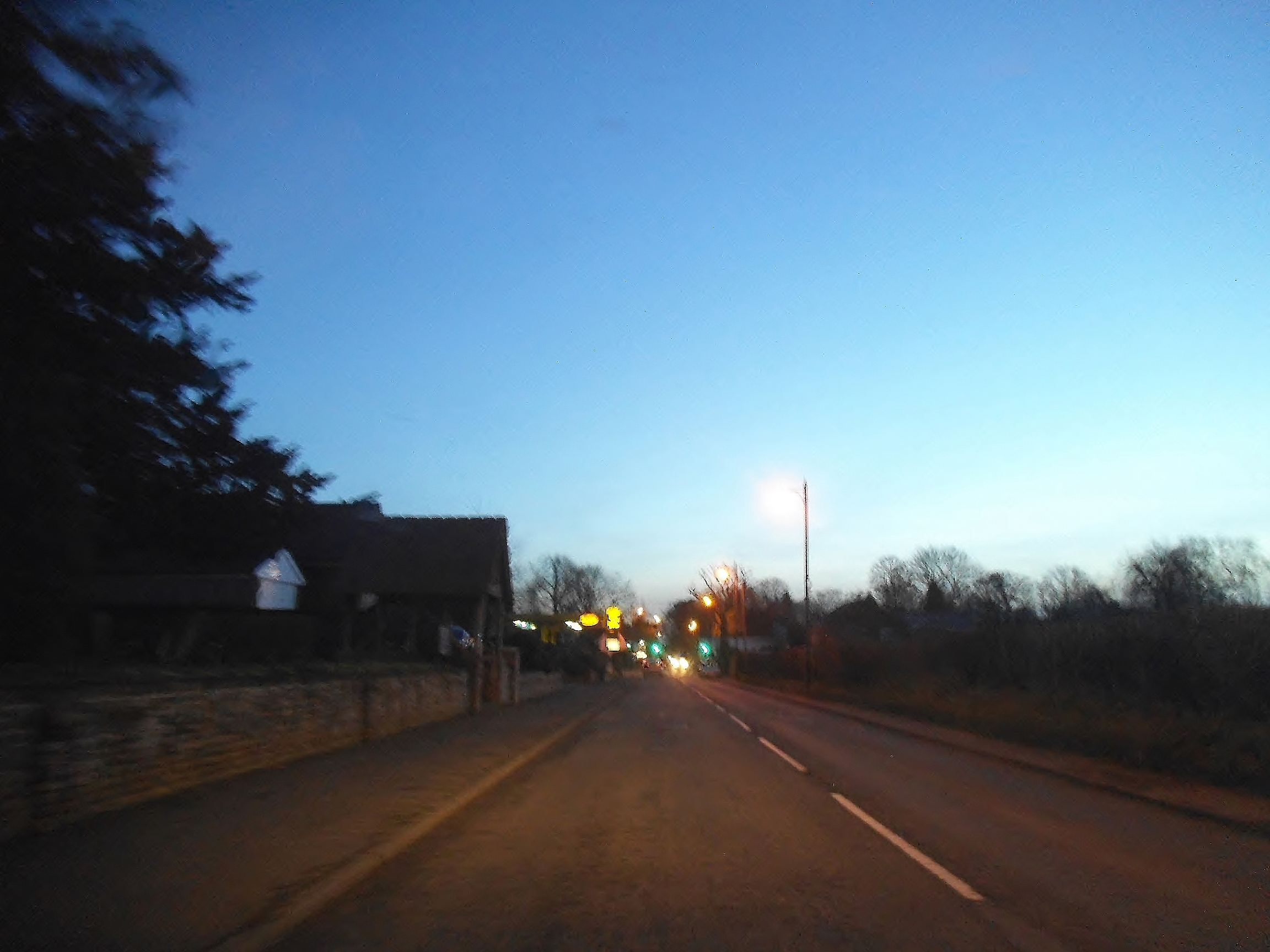
Dusk over High Road, High Cross

== Nearby settlements ==
Some nearby settlements include the villages of Thundridge and Wadesmill to the south, the hamlets of Colliers End to the north, Dane End to the west and Barwick to the east.

== Amenities ==
High Cross contains Puller Memorial Primary school, St John the Evangelist Church, and formerly the White Horse Pub which closed down in 2017.

== Notable residents ==
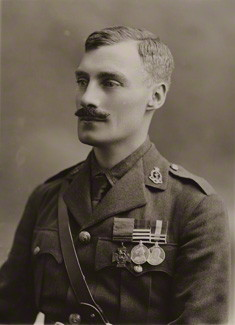
Arthur Martin-Leake, c. 1902

- Lieutenant Colonel Arthur Martin-Leake, VC & Bar, VD, FRCS (1874-1953), double recipient of the Victoria Cross lived in High Cross in the later years of his life and is now buried in the village church.
