= Wadesmill =

Hamlet in Hertfordshire, England

Coordinates: 51.839°N 0.03°W

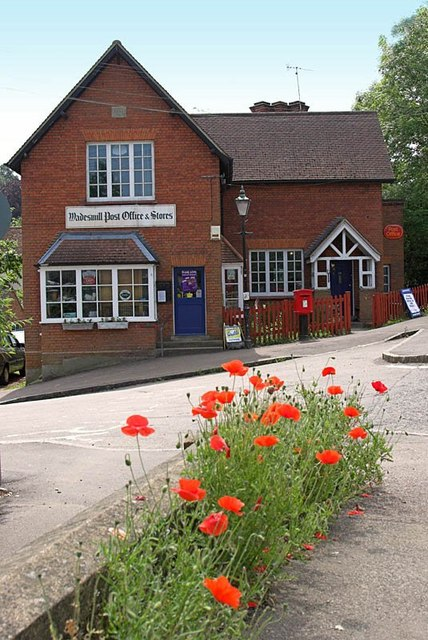
- Thundridge (adjoining Wadesmill) former Post Office and village shop which served both villages until closure

- Location within Hertfordshire
- Shire county: Hertfordshire
- Region: East
- Country: England
- Sovereign state: United Kingdom
- Post town: WARE
- Postcode district: SG

Wadesmill is a hamlet in Hertfordshire, England, located on the north side of the River Rib, with an estimated population of 264. At the 2011 Census the population of the hamlet was included in the civil parish of Thundridge. Running through the centre of Wadesmill is the road formerly known as the A10 (the main London to King's Lynn (via Cambridge) road) but now that the A10 by-pass has been built, Wadesmill and surrounding villages have returned to the quiet of former times. The route that was formerly the A10 is an ancient one, with portions of it following the line of the Roman road, Ermine Street. Ermine Street also figures as the former main street in Wadesmill's adjacent village Thundridge.

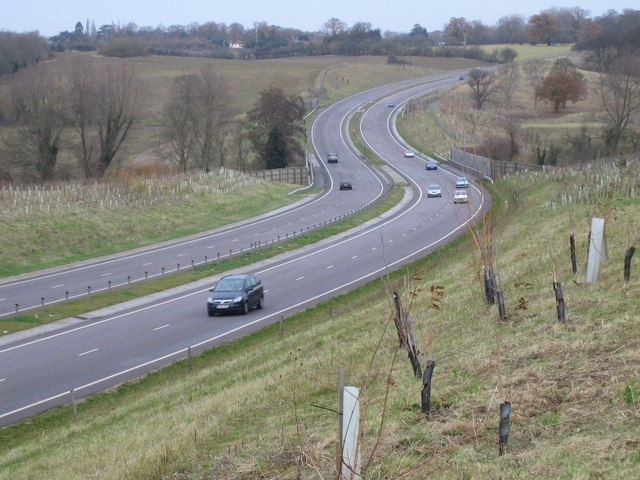
A10 Wadesmill Bypass

== History ==
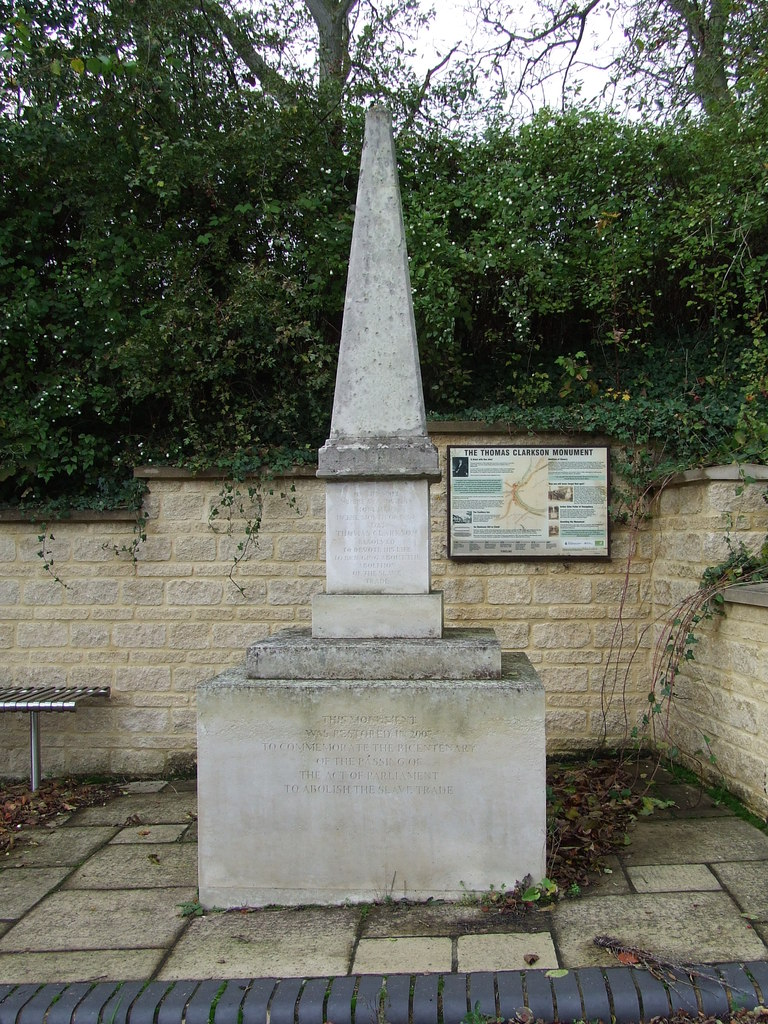
The Thomas Clarkson Memorial

Historically Wadesmill is particularly notable for two features:

- The location of the first turnpike in England, authorised by an act of Parliament in 1663
- The Clarkson Memorial, halfway up nearby High Cross hill, a memorial to Thomas Clarkson's rest point in his travels at which he decided to devote much of the rest of his life to ending the slave trade.

The first effective turnpike in England was created at Wadesmill by Act of Parliament ("The Turnpike Act") in 1663 as a result of serious deterioration of the "Old North Road" due to travel by laden barley wagons supplying the brewing trade in the nearby malting town of Ware. But as with many government-imposed taxes, routes to circumvent the turnpike were quickly established, resulting in one instance in the increased use of what became known as the Great North Road: the A1.

In 1785, Thomas Clarkson won a Latin essay prize at the University of Cambridge for an essay on the subject, Anne liceat Invitos in Servitutem dare ("Is it right to make slaves of others against their will?"). He was greatly affected by the subject during his research into the essay, and later wrote:

As it is usual to read these essays publicly in the senate-house soon after the prize is adjudged, I was called to Cambridge for this purpose. I went and performed my office. On returning however to London, the subject of it almost wholly engrossed my thoughts. I became at times very seriously affected while upon the road. I stopped my horse occasionally, and dismounted and walked. I frequently tried to persuade myself in these intervals that the contents of my essay could not be true. The more, however, I reflected upon them, or rather upon the authorities on which they were founded, the more I gave them credit. Coming in sight of Wades Mill, in Hertfordshire, I sat down disconsolate on the turf by the roadside and held my horse. Here a thought came into my mind, that if the contents of the essay were true, it was time some person should see these calamities to their end. Agitated in this manner, I reached home. This was in the summer of 1785.

To the east of Wadesmill is the picturesque estate of Youngsbury. "Youngsbury consists of an 18th-century park and woodland with 4 hectares of garden around the house, the front part of which is dated 1745, the back early 19th century, with 18th-century stables. There are extensive 16th to 18th-century walled kitchen gardens, an arboretum, an icehouse and tumuli and Roman barrows within the grounds, which extend to the river Rib. Capability Brown's involvement included widening the river and creating two islands, designing a ha ha and placing small groups of trees in open parkland. Nineteenth-century development of the kitchen garden was re-created in the late 20th century, with notable mixed borders. There is a moat and church in a bend of the river on the southern edge of the parkland." Capability Brown is said to have reviewed the rolling parkland surrounding Youngsbury house and observed that he need do nothing to improve upon what nature had already achieved.

The moat and church referenced in the HCC quote are in fact Thundridge Bury and Thundridge old church, neither of which are still standing in their entirety.

== See also ==
The Hundred Parishes
