= Buckland, Hertfordshire =

Village in East Hertfordshire, England

Coordinates: 51.9833°N 0.0200°W

Buckland
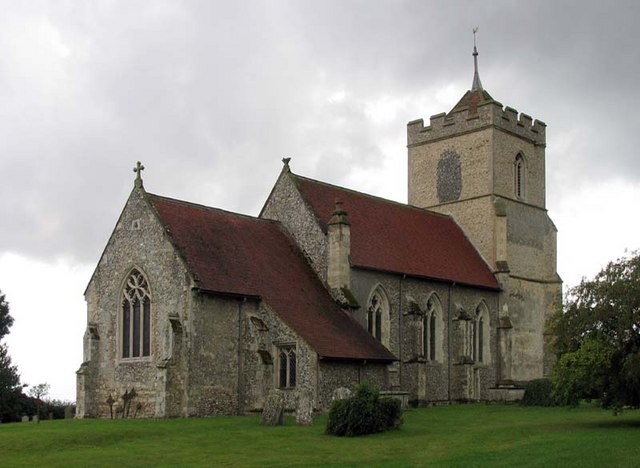
- St Andrew's, parish church

- Location within Hertfordshire
- Population: 271 (Parish, 2021)
- OS grid reference: TL 35597 33638
- Civil parish: Buckland and Chipping
- District: East Hertfordshire
- Shire county: Hertfordshire
- Region: East
- Country: England
- Sovereign state: United Kingdom
- Post town: Buntingford
- Postcode district: SG9
- Dialling code: 01763
- Police: Hertfordshire
- Fire: Hertfordshire
- Ambulance: East of England
- UK Parliament: North East Hertfordshire

Buckland is a village in the civil parish of Buckland and Chipping, in the East Hertfordshire district of Hertfordshire, England. The village is situated on the A10 road, 3 miles (5 km) north of Buntingford, its post town. As well as the small village of Buckland itself, the parish covers surrounding rural areas, including the hamlet of Chipping. At the 2021 census the parish had a population of 271. On 1 April 2026 the parish was renamed from "Buckland" to "Buckland and Chipping".

== See also ==
- St Andrew's Church, Buckland
