= Reimann =

Reimann (Hebrew: ריימן) is a German and Jewish surname, also Reiman, Reinman, Rhinemann, Riemann. It is also commonly associated with Ashkenazi Jews.

Notable people with the surnames include:

- Aribert Reimann (1936–2024), German composer and pianist
- Antonín Reimann (1888–1976), Czech American architect
- Bernhard Riemann (1826–1866), German mathematician
- Brigitte Reimann (1933–1973), German writer
- Brody Reiman (born 1970), American artist of the collaborative team castaneda/reiman
- Carola Reimann (born 1967), German politician
- Gotthold Reimann (1859–1932), Australian teacher of music
- Günter Reimann (1904–2005), German Jewish economist
- Hans Reimann (writer) (1889–1969), German writer
- Hans-Georg Reimann (born 1941), East German racewalker
- Hobart Reimann (1897–1986), American virologist and physician
- Heinrich Reimann (1850–1906), Musicologist
- Joey Reiman (born 1953), American Jewish advertising businessman and author
- Katya Reimann (born 1965), American novelist
- Leonid Reiman (born 1957), Russian politician
- Leopold Reimann, (1892–1917), German flying ace
- Lukas Reimann (Swiss politician) (born 1982)
- Max Reimann (1898–1977), German politician
- Paul Reinman (1910–1988), American comic book artist
- Robert Reimann (Swiss politician) (1911–1987)
- Robert Reimann (United States Navy officer) (1936–2014), U.S. Navy rear admiral
- Solomon Riemann (1815–1880), Jewish traveler
- Tip Reiman (born 2001), American football player
- William Reimann (born 1935) American sculptor
- Yosef Reinman (born 1935) American Orthodox rabbi and writer, historian, and scholar.

== See also ==
- Jewish partisans
- Reiman Gardens
- Reimann School, The Reimann School of Art and Design
- Riemann, a similar surname
- Riemann hypothesis
