= Riemann (surname) =

Riemann is a German surname. Notable people with this surname include the following:

- Bernhard Riemann (1826–1866), German mathematician, originator of Riemannian geometry
- Fritz Riemann (1859–1932), German chess master
- Fritz Riemann (psychologist) (1902–1979), German psychoanalyst
- Hugo Riemann (1849–1919), German musicologist
- Johannes Riemann (1888–1959), German actor
- Katja Riemann (born 1963), German actress
- Leopold Reimann (1892–1917), German flying ace
- Manuel Riemann (born 1988), German football (soccer) player
- Paula Riemann (born 1993), German actress
- Solomon Riemann (died c. 1873), Jewish traveller

== See also ==
- Reimann, a similar surname
- List of topics named after Bernhard Riemann
- Riemann (crater), a lunar crater
