= Awdry Vaucour =

English WWI flying ace (1890–1918)

Awdry Morris Vaucour
- Born: 8 March 1890; Topcliffe, Yorkshire, England
- Died: 16 July 1918 (aged 28); Vicinity of Monastier di Treviso, Italy
- Burial place: Montecchio Precalcino Communal Cemetery Extension, Montecchio Precalcino, Italy; 45.6665°N 11.5578°E
- Military career
- Allegiance: United Kingdom
- Branch: British Army; Royal Air Force
- Service years: 1914–1918
- Rank: Major
- Nickname: "Bunny"
- Units: Royal Field Artillery; No. 10 Squadron RFC; No. 70 Squadron RFC
- Commands: No. 45 Squadron RAF
- Conflicts: First World War: Western Front; Italian front
- Awards: Military Cross & Bar; Distinguished Flying Cross; Mentioned in Despatches (2); Medal of Military Valor (Italy)

Awdry Morris Vaucour, MC & Bar, DFC (8 March 1890 – 16 July 1918) was a First World War flying ace credited with seven aerial victories. For part of his career he flew with observer/gunner Alan Bott, who would go on to become an ace in his own right. Vaucour was killed in Italy in a "friendly fire" incident, when he was shot down by an Italian Hanriot pilot.

== Military career ==
Vaucour, having served as a cadet in the University of London Officers' Training Corps, was commissioned as a temporary second lieutenant in the Royal Field Artillery of the British Army on 1 September 1914, soon after the outbreak of the First World War.

On 28 September 1915 Vaucour flew on a reconnaissance mission over Valenciennes and Douai, piloted by Captain Euan Rabagliati, completing the mission despite thick cloud and heavy anti-aircraft fire over the objective. Both men were subsequently awarded the Military Cross. Soon after, on 22 November, Vaucour was officially appointed a flying officer (observer) in the Royal Flying Corps. Vaucour, still listed as a member of the Royal Field Artillery, also received a mention in despatches from Field Marshal Sir John French, commander-in-chief (C-in-C) of the British Expeditionary Force (BEF), on 30 November, "for gallant and distinguished service in the field".

Vaucour then trained as a pilot, being granted Royal Aero Club Aviator's Certificate No. 2765 after flying a Maurice Farman biplane at the Military Flying School at Catterick Bridge on 10 April 1916. He was posted to No. 70 Squadron RFC, flying the Sopwith 1½ Strutter. On 24 August, he and his observer, Lieutenant Alan Bott, were shot up and forced to land by Leopold Reimann of Jasta 1. However, on 2 September, he and Bott destroyed a Fokker E over Bourlon Wood, and twenty minutes later, drove down another out of control. They also destroyed a Fokker E over Hendicourt on 15 September, the same day that Vaucour was appointed a flight commander with the acting rank of captain. Within a month he had been awarded a bar to his Military Cross.

Vaucour returned to England and was for a short time posted to No. 28 Reserve Squadron based at Castle Bromwich, before being appointed an instructor at the Central Flying School at Upavon on 23 January 1917. He remained there until 22 August.

Vaucour then returned to combat in Italy, and having been appointed a squadron commander with the acting rank of major, became commanding officer of No. 45 Squadron on 24 August. On 24 September he was promoted to lieutenant in the Royal Artillery, though remaining seconded to the RFC with his acting rank.

On 27 February 1918, flying a Sopwith Camel, Vaucour accounted for two Albatros D.IIIs over Oderzo–Ponte di Piave. On 18 April he received a second mention in despatches for "distinguished and gallant services and devotion to duty", from General Herbert Plumer, and was awarded the Distinguished Flying Cross in the King's Birthday Honours on 3 June. He went on to destroy two further enemy aircraft on 19 and 25 June.

Vaucour was killed in action on 16 July 1918, when he was mistakenly shot down by an Hanriot HD.1 from the Italian 78a Squadriglia near Monastier di Treviso. He was buried in the Montecchio Precalcino Communal Cemetery Extension, and is commemorated on the war memorial at St Mary Magdalene's Roman Catholic Church in Bexhill-on-Sea, Sussex. He was posthumously awarded the Italian Silver Medal of Military Valor in November 1918.

== Awards and citations ==
Military Cross
Temporary Second Lieutenant Awdry Morris Vaucour, Royal Field Artillery and Royal Flying Corps.

"For conspicuous gallantry and skill on 28th September, 1915, when, accompanied by Captain Rabagliati, they carried out a reconnaissance over Valenciennes and Douai. They had to fly in thick cloud for nearly the whole distance, and several times their aeroplane got into a "spin." The pilot, however, succeeded each time in righting his machine, and they reached their objective and carried out the reconnaissance at 2,800 feet under very heavy fire".

Bar to the Military Cross
Second Lieutenant (Temporary Captain) Awdry Morris Vaucour, MC, Royal Field Artillery.

"For conspicuous gallantry in action. He attacked 10 hostile machines and completely scattered their formation. Previously, while returning with a perforated petrol tank, he shot down an enemy machine. Later, he shot down a hostile machine, being engaged with eight altogether. On another occasion he and his observer shot down two hostile machines."
