= St Mary Magdalene's Church, Bexhill-on-Sea =

St Mary Magdalene's Church
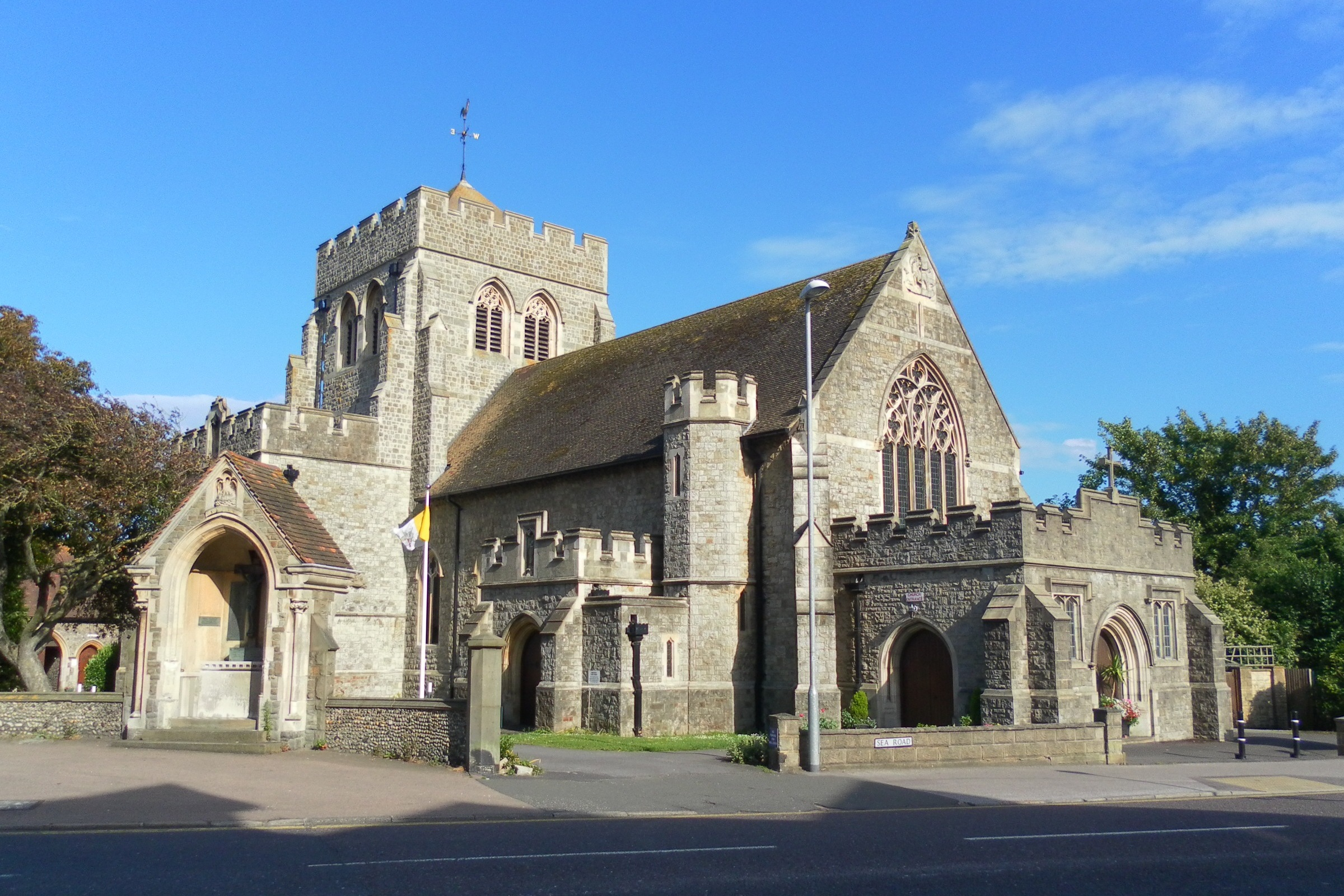
- St Mary Magdalene's Church
- 50.8414°N 0.4780°E
- Location: Bexhill-on-Sea, East Sussex
- Country: England
- Denomination: Roman Catholic
- Website: StmmBexhill.co.uk

History
- Status: Active
- Dedication: Mary Magdalene
- Consecrated: 1913

Architecture
- Functional status: Parish church
- Heritage designation: Grade II listed
- Designated: 23 August 1976
- Architect: Arthur Young
- Style: Gothic Revival
- Groundbreaking: 1906
- Completed: 1907

Administration
- Province: Southwark
- Diocese: Arundel and Brighton
- Deanery: St Leonards-on-Sea

St Mary Magdalene's Church is a Roman Catholic Parish church in Bexhill-on-Sea, East Sussex, England. It was founded in 1893 and built in 1907 in the Gothic Revival style. Dedicated to Jesus' companion Mary Magdalene, it is situated on the corner of Sea Road and Magdalen Road opposite Station Road and Bexhill railway station in the centre of the town. It was designed by Arthur Young and is a Grade II listed building.

== History ==
In 1893, a Catholic mission was founded in the town. There was a small church and school housed in the same building. This was next to a presbytery.

From 1906 to 1907, the present church was built. When it was completed, the building that housed the old church and school became the church hall. The church was designed by a convert to Catholicism, Arthur Young. He was born in 1853 and went to Stamford Grammar School before apprenticing with Somers Clarke & Mickelthwaite. In 1877, he started his own architectural firm and went on to design churches and chapels including the Benson Memorial Church, St Dominic's School in Harrow and Church of Our Lady and St Peter, Aldeburgh, when he died during its construction in 1924.

The church contains a painting of the Crucifixion of Jesus by August Neven du Mont and a war memorial mentioning Awdry Vaucour. In 1913, the church was consecrated.

== Parish ==
The church also serves two nearby Catholic churches: Our Lady of the Rosary Church in Sidley and St Martha's Church in Little Common, Bexhill. Our Lady of the Rosary Church was built in 1954, designed by Alex F. Watson from the architectural firm of Hannen & Markham, and cost £12,372. St Martha's Church was designed by Marshall Wood, cost £7,114 and was built from 11 August 1939 to 1940.

St Mary Magdalene's Church has three Sunday Masses: 6:00pm on Saturday, and 11:00am and 6:00pm on Sunday. Every week, Monday to Saturday, St Mary Magdalene's Church has a Mass at 10:00am. Our Lady of the Rosary Church has one Sunday Mass at 10:00am. St Martha's Church also has one Sunday Mass, it is at 9:00am.

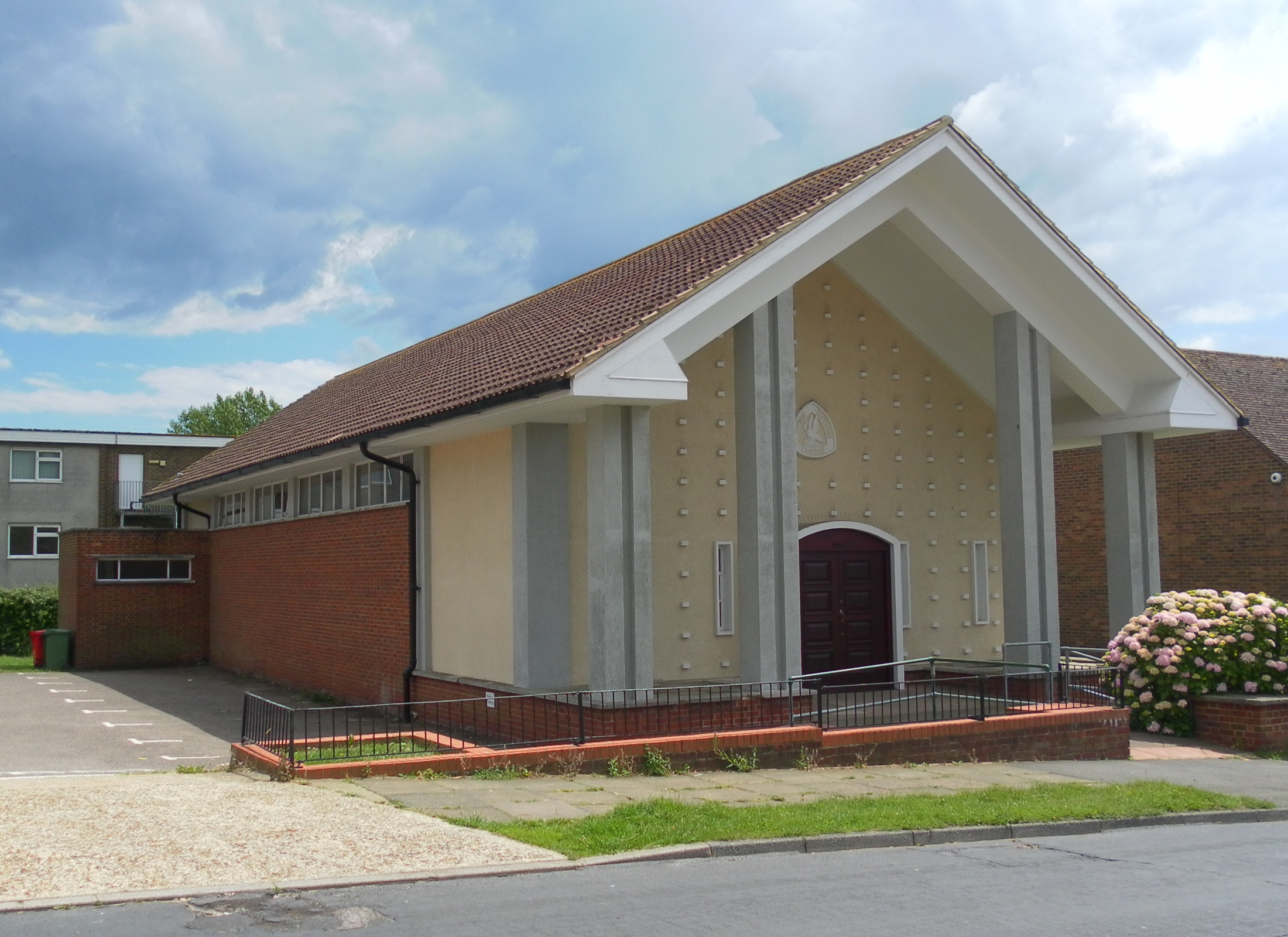
Our Lady of the Rosary Church, Sidley

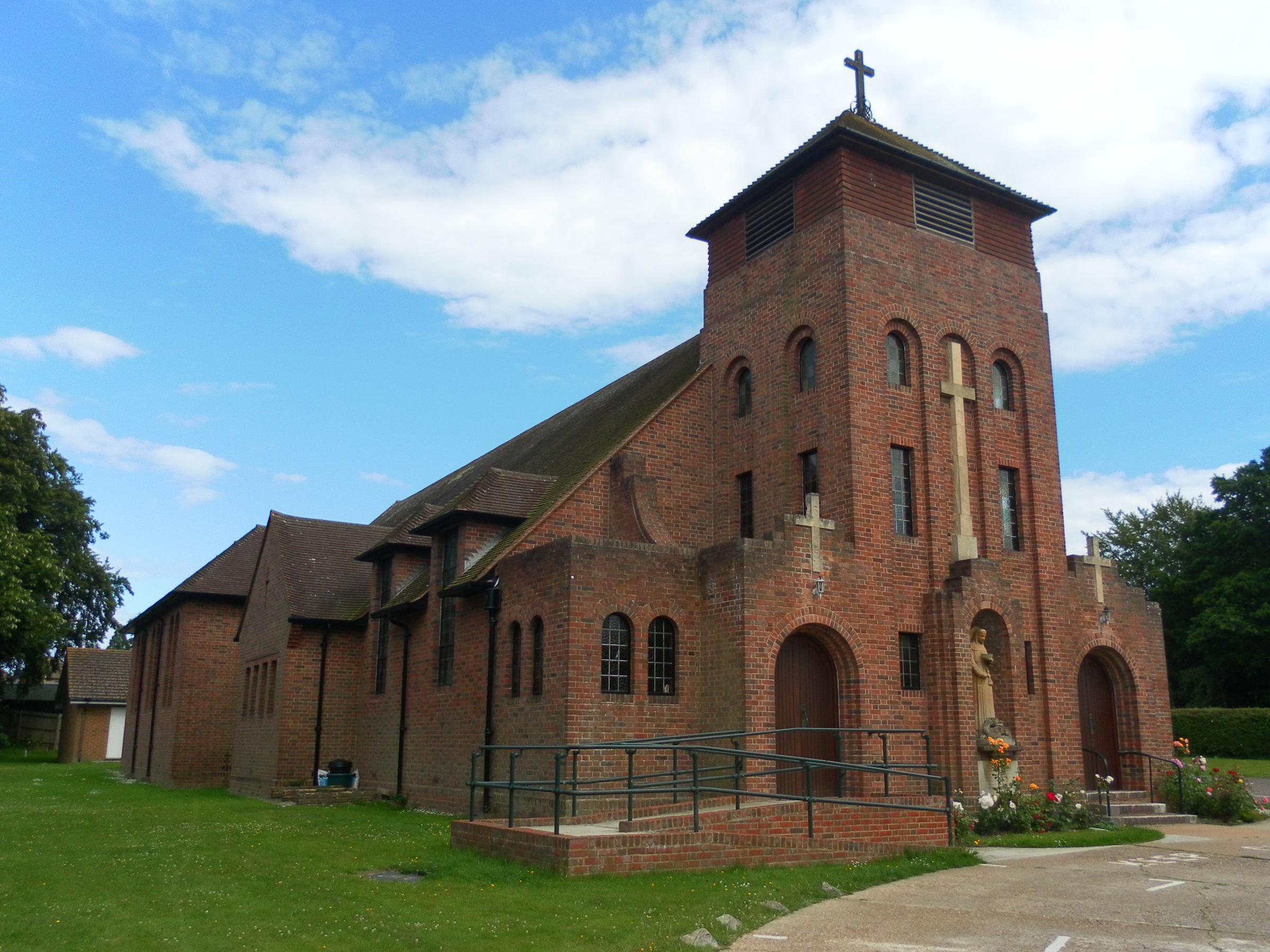
St Martha's Church, Little Common

== See also ==
- List of places of worship in Rother
- Roman Catholic Diocese of Arundel and Brighton
