= Adjoa Andoh =

English actress (born 1963)

Adjoa Andoh MBE HonFRSL
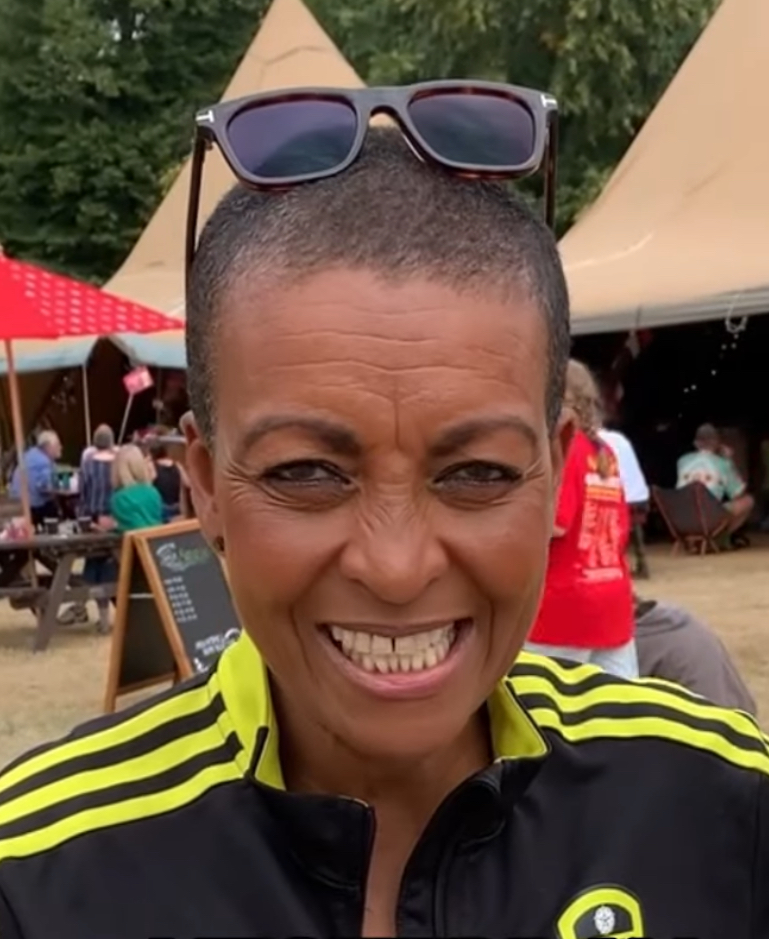
- Andoh in 2026
- Born: Adjoa Aiboom Helen Andoh; 14 January 1963 (age 63); Clifton, Bristol, England
- Occupation: Actress
- Years active: 1984–present
- Spouse: Howard Cunnell (m. 2001)
- Children: 3

Adjoa Aiboom Helen Andoh (/ˈædʒoʊə ˈændoʊ/; born 14 January 1963) is an English actress and theatre director. She began her career in theatre and first gained prominence through her roles in the BBC soap operas EastEnders (1990–1991) and Casualty (1993; 2000–2003), followed by Doctor Who (2007–2008). More recently, she starred in the Netflix period drama Bridgerton (2020–). Her films include Invictus (2009).

In July 2022, Andoh became an honorary fellow of the Royal Society of Literature, and in June 2025 was appointed Member of the Order of the British Empire (MBE).

== Early life and education ==
Adjoa Aiboom Helen Andoh was born on 14 January 1963 in Clifton, Bristol, England to an English mother, a teacher, and a Ghanaian father, a journalist and musician. Andoh has a brother. Andoh grew up in Wickwar in Gloucestershire, where her family moved after her father got a job with British Aerospace.

As a teenager, Andoh suffered from anorexia and distress in the wake of her parents' divorce.

Andoh attended Katharine Lady Berkeley's School and then started studying law at Bristol Polytechnic, but left after two years to pursue an acting career.

== Career ==
=== Film ===
Andoh appeared in Noel Clarke's 2008 film Adulthood and its 2016 sequel Brotherhood as the mother of Clarke's character, Sam Peel.

She played chief of staff Brenda Mazibuko opposite Morgan Freeman's Nelson Mandela in Clint Eastwood's 2009 drama film Invictus, which she cited as one of her three most satisfying roles to date in 2021.

=== Television ===
Her television credits include Casualty – she played Colette Griffiths (née Kierney) from 2000 until 2003), – as well as Jonathan Creek and EastEnders (playing jazz singer Karen, the lodger of Rachel Kominski, in 1991). She played a doctor in the 1992 Series 3 episode "Sleeping Pills" of Waiting for God.

She has appeared in Doctor Who a number of times: in 2006 as Sister Jatt in series 2 episode "New Earth" and as Nurse Albertine in the audio drama Year of the Pig. In 2007, she appeared in several episodes of the third series ("Smith and Jones", "The Lazarus Experiment", "42", "The Sound of Drums", and "Last of the Time Lords") as Francine Jones, the mother of Martha Jones (Freema Agyeman). She reprised her role in the finale of series 4 ("The Stolen Earth" and "Journey's End"). Andoh's other television work includes playing the head of M.I.9 in Series 3 to Series 5 of M.I. High and D.C.I. Ford in Missing. In the American streaming television drama series Bridgerton (2020) she plays Lady Danbury. She played the guest role of Mother Nenneke in the second season of the Polish - American fantasy drama streaming television series The Witcher (2021). In April 2023, The Real Crown: Inside the House of Windsor, an ITV television documentary series on the British royal family, aired. Andoh narrates the series.

In 2021, it was announced that she was working with Bridgerton producer Julie Anne Robinson on a version of Vanessa Riley's novel, The Island Queen, for television.

She narrated documentary series Chateau DIY on Channel 4 from 2021.

In 2024, Andoh starred in a Christmas advertising campaign for Boots, as "Mrs. Claus".

=== Radio / audio ===
In 1991, Andoh read on BBC Radio 4's programme A Book at Bedtime a five-part abridgement by Margaret Busby of Simi Bedford's novel Yoruba Girl Dancing. Other Radio 4 readings by Andoh include a 10-part adaptation (also by Busby) of Jean Rhys's most famous novel Wide Sargasso Sea, first broadcast in 2004.

Andoh has narrated more than 150 audiobooks. She was a member of the BBC's Radio Drama Company. She narrated one audio book version of Alexander McCall Smith's The No. 1 Ladies' Detective Agency series of detective novels and Ann Leckie's Imperial Radch Series trilogy (although not all of the US editions), as well as Julia Jarman's children's books, The Jessame Stories and More Jessame Stories. She also narrated the audio book version of Nnedi Okorafor's novel Lagoon with Ben Onwukwe, and Chimamanda Ngozi Adichie's Americanah. She narrated The Power by Naomi Alderman, former President Barack Obama's favorite book of 2017.

Her career in audio dramas has included the Voice of Planet B in the science fiction series Planet B on BBC Radio 7. In 2004, she was cast in the video game Fable. In 2017, she provided the voice of war chief Sona in the video game Horizon Zero Dawn. In 2020, it was announced that Andoh would direct Lettie Precious's Nina Simone's Four Negro Women as part of the Written on the Waves audio project.

Penguin Random House has given her the title of "Queen of audio and radio drama" for her extensive work in the medium.

=== Theatre ===
Andoh has worked extensively in the theatre. She signed her first Equity contract in 1985 with Theatre Centre, a theatre company producing plays for young people. In 1989, she played the character Glory in Glory, for Temba Theatre Company, which she cited as one of her three most satisfying roles to date in 2021.

Her credits include His Dark Materials, Stuff Happens and The Revenger's Tragedy at the National Theatre; A Streetcar Named Desire (National Theatre Studio); Troilus and Cressida, Julius Caesar, Tamburlaine and The Odyssey (RSC); Sugar Mummies and Breath Boom (Royal Court); Richard II (Globe); Les Liaisons Dangereuses (Donmar Warehouse); Great Expectations (Bristol Old Vic); Blood Wedding (Almeida); Nights at the Circus, The Dispute and Pericles (Lyric Hammersmith); Julius Caesar (The Bridge); Purgatorio (Arcola); The Vagina Monologues (Criterion); Starstruck (Tricycle) and In The Red and Brown Water (Young Vic).

In 2019, she co-directed with Lynette Linton a production of Richard II at Shakespeare's Globe. It was the first production of the play in the UK with a cast entirely of women of colour. It was praised by theatre critics, and a role which she cited as one of her three most satisfying roles to date in 2021.

In 2023, she directed and starred in Richard III at Liverpool Playhouse and Rose Theatre Kingston. She was the only Black actress in the cast as a comment on the title character's Otherness.

== Service to the arts ==
Andoh is Associate Artist for the Royal Shakespeare Company and Senior Associate Artist at the Bush Theatre.

She has served on numerous awards committees, including the Women's Prize for Playwriting (2020), a judge for the inaugural BAME science fiction writer's award for Gollancz (2020), the Literature Matters Awards for the Royal Society of Literature (2021), the Susan Smith Blackburn Prize (2021–22), and she was a jury member for the Booker Prize (2023).

She has served as a judge for the Carleton Hobbs Award and the Norman Beaton Fellowship. She is a co-founder of the Future Worlds Prize for science fiction writers of color. In 2023, she hosted an event at the Black to the Future Festival in London.

Andoh co-directs the production company Swinging the Lens with her friend and publicist Juanne Fuller. Through the company, Andoh seeks "to tell the stories that are on the roads less trodden, narratively, the outlier or less viewed stories."

=== Honours ===
Andoh is a teacher at the Royal Academy of Arts (RADA) and Rose Bruford College. In 2021, she was named an Honorary Fellow at Rose Bruford College.

In 2021, Andoh was named an Honorary Fellow of the British Shakespeare Association. Also in 2021, she was named Cameron Mackintosh Visiting Professor of Contemporary Theatre at St. Catherine's College, University of Oxford. In 2022, she was elected to the Royal Society of Literature.

Andoh was appointed Member of the Order of the British Empire (MBE) in the 2025 Birthday Honours for services to drama.

== Personal life ==
Andoh met her husband, Howard Cunnell, in 1994 when he took over the bookshop at Battersea Arts Centre, where Andoh's theatre company Wild Iris had an office. They have been together since late 1995, married in 2001 and have two children. Andoh also has a daughter from a previous relationship. Cunnell has worked as a lecturer, writer, scuba diving instructor, and a lifeguard. The couple live in Sussex as of 2022, having previously lived in Brixton.

In October 2009, Andoh was licensed as a reader in the Church of England for the parish of Herne Hill.

=== Activism ===
In 2014, Andoh gave a TED talk at TEDxBermuda about her experience as a parent of a trans child. Andoh has spoken candidly about sexuality and racism. In response to the April 2025 Supreme Court ruling on the definition of woman, Andoh attended a protest in London in favour of trans rights.

She has been a Fairtrade Ambassador since 2005.

In 2024, Andoh publicly expressed support for Labour in the 2024 Election.

=== 2023 Coronation comments ===
In May 2023, following the coronation of King Charles III, Andoh stated that the day's proceedings had "gone from the rich diversity of the Abbey to a terribly white balcony". 8,371 complaints were made to the media watchdog Ofcom, the highest number of complaints for a TV broadcast in 2023. Andoh explained: "I was talking about the day and how marvellous it was and then looking at the balcony at the end and suddenly going: 'Oh it's so white!' because the day had been so mixed. I didn't mean to upset anybody." In June 2023, Ofcom announced that they would not be taking action over the comment as it was "a personal observation".

== Recognition and honours ==
In 2021, Andoh was made an honorary fellow of the Rose Bruford College in London. The college described her as "a national treasure of the performing arts".

In July 2022, she was made an honorary fellow of the Royal Society of Literature (HonFRSL).

Andoh was made a Member of the British Empire (MBE) in the King's Birthday Honours in June 2025.

Andoh has also won and been nominated for numerous acting awards, including a nomination for the NAACP Award for Outstanding Support Actress in 2021.
