= Robert Mouzillat =

Robert Gustave Mouzillat (1913–2010) was the founder of La Stereochromie which traded as RoMo, a stereoscopic image company. In the 1950s Robert Mouzillat, an early pioneer of 3D photography, together with his father, Gustave, invented a 3D camera and created an extensive collection of photographs and film. His contacts in the French government, particularly because of his intelligence work during the War, gave Mouzillat unprecedented access to important people and places in France. The Collection provide an interesting and important view of France in the 1940s, 50s and 60s.

== Early life and career ==
Robert was born in Suresnes in 1913 and died in Paris in 2010. He married Josette Garthwaite and had one daughter, Elizabeth.

As a young man he had a diverse career. He was a graduate of the Lycee Turgot and of the Ecole Superieure de Commerce de Paris. He was also a graduate of the Ecoles de Commerce d'Espagne et d'Angleterre. In 1932 he joined Rhone Poulenc which was interrupted with his National Service in the Corps de l'Aviation Militaire. On returning to Rhone Poulenc he was Head of the Far East Division. After passing the Civil Service entrance examination in 1938, he joined the French Ministere de l'Interieur (1939 to 1949). From 1941 to 1944 he was active in the French Resistance. He and his wife were imprisoned in Vichy and were released in May 1942.

In May 1945 he was a member of the French Delegation under General Charles de Gaulle and attended the United Nations Conference on International Organization (UNCIO), a convention of delegates from 50 Allied nations that took place from 25 April 1945 to 26 June 1945 in San Francisco, United States. At this convention, the delegates reviewed and rewrote the Dumbarton Oaks agreements.

== Pan Books ==
In 1947 he became a director and participated in the development of publishing company Pan Books. With the support of the board of Pan Books he developed a means of exploiting a new printing technique, combining text with voice on disk. This took him into the use of the photographic process in printing. Alan Bott said of his appointment to the board of Pan Books "...the reason why I nominated you as a Pan Books Director is that you had provided excellent (not to say brilliant) service for us in Paris and that, in my opinion, it was a good thing for you to have the status of Director in dealing with officials and with the Heads of the production houses who do work for us." Simultaneous with this appointment he created two separate companies in Paris in publishing, Les Editions Albatross and Le Livre Universel.

== RoMo Stereoscopic Images ==
In 1949 he founded SA Les Editions RoMo, of which he was the sole owner, to conceive and develop a camera to produce precision three-dimensional photographic images, identical to those recorded by the human eye. The camera produced colour positive images. Working with his father, Gustave, an engineer, they invented a camera with two lenses that operate on the principle of the human eye, taking left and right images that could be reproduced for viewing, both as 3D still images and movies. The negatives that were produced are in fact colour positives.

Two types of cameras were developed which had the same optical characteristics but had different speeds of exposure. The first could produce a double image every 4 seconds with a shutter speed ranging from 1/2 second to 1/100 of a second. The second camera could produce 38 double images per second with a shutter speed ranging from 1/35th to 1/380th of a second. The size of the images were 12mm x 13mm with one metre of film taking 65 images. The images produced very high quality photographs in either monochrome or colour up to 300mm x 400mm.

In 1958 his two-lens camera was presented at the Brussels World Trade Fair (Expo 58) where it was awarded the bronze medal. The publicity afforded by this success attracted the attention of Professor Roger Heim of the Muséum national d'Histoire naturelle.

== Working with the French Government ==
His work with Professor Heim attracted the attention of other departments in the French Government. Thus began a collaboration with the Cancer Institute of Villejuif recording surgical techniques, the Audio Visual Department of the Department of Youth and Sport, as well as the National Education Institute and the International Office for Sports and Physical Education.

== RoMo Image Collection ==
In 1956 Mouzillat developed a distinctive art deco branding for RoMo and started to commercialise his collection. He developed a card-based viewing system, using Bakelite viewers. He sold a wide variety of subject cards, usually with 12 left and right eye images, at newsstands throughout Paris, in France and at trade shows. The catalogues from 1956 and 1957 demonstrate the wide range of geographic, historic and cultural subjects that were documented. He also created a range of cards for children focussing on characters, animals, birds and insects.

No accurate count has been attempted of the entire collection but it is estimated that the double images total around 40,000 left and right eye images.

The collection can be grouped into specific categories including:

- The Regions, Towns and Cities of interest in France and other European countries
- The Interiors of the Élysée Palace
- Folklore Costumes of France, Spain, Yugoslavia, Russia and Japan
- Speleology, prehistoric sites of France, grottoes and frescoes
- Art Collections in France including interiors of the Musee Rodin, Musee du Louvre and Musee de Sèvres
- Animals, birds, insects, flowers and butterflies from around the world
- Historical and fictional characters from children's literature.

== Tintin and Hergé's studio ==
Mouzillat's invention and his work came to the attention of Georges Remi (Hergé) as a result of his success at the Brussels World Fair. Together they established a collaboration to market Tintin stories as 3D strip cartoons. A number of gouache drawings in colour were prepared for conversion to 3D photographic images. This was an important collaboration as it proved that 3D images could be created from 2D content. Cards on a variety of Tintin subjects were produced and sold.

== Pablo Picasso at La Californie ==
Intrigued by the 3D process, Mouzillat was invited to spend Easter weekend 1957 by Picasso at his home in the south of France. He took hundreds of photos of Picasso in his studio, in the garden, at the bullfight in Arles and with his then mistress Mme Jacqueline Roque, her daughter Catherine Hutin-Blay, his biographer John Richardson (art historian), the actor Jean Cocteau and his official photographer David Douglas Duncan. Cards of Picasso 3D photographs were published and sold by RoMo.

== Stereographic Photographs of Pablo Picasso at the Holburne Museum ==
From 22 February 2014 to 1 June 2014 The Holburne Museum in Bath, UK will present a 3D show of a selection of the collection of Mouzillat's Picasso images. Visitors will be required to wear 3D glasses to see the images on special 3D screens. Brian May, Chairman of the London Stereoscopic Company, prepared many of the images for the book to accompany the show. The images can be viewed with the 'Owl' viewer developed by May for his various publications. John Richardson, Picasso's official biographer, provided an introduction to the show and is pictured in many of the images.

== Arnold Palmer ==
The exceptionally high quality of the images he was producing led to an approach by Paris-Match to publish images of the Arnold Palmer golf swing in conjunction with an article "Improve your golf with Arnold Palmer". The Collection includes a series of moving images that have never been published.

== Nudes ==
In the 1950s Mouzillat obtained permission from the French authorities to use the 3D camera to photograph nudes in a variety of locations and situations. Clever sets were used to create entertaining views. Hundreds of photos are contained in the Collection that have never been published.

== Kodak ==
In 1964 Eastman Kodak, whose laboratories had been doing all the film processing work, made an approach to purchase the camera and the technology. In 1965 France-Soir also approached Mouzillat and attempted to purchase the camera and the associated technology.

== Further development ==
Between 1989 and 1996 he worked jointly with High Definition Image Processing Department of The Centre for TV Transmission and Communications (France Telecom). Studies were conducted in Rennes for the development of three-dimensional technology, alongside their own research, for the use with a television screen. This eventually resulted in a successful public demonstration in Paris of a 3D television system. Eventually under the guidance of M. Marc Cantagrel the use of the camera was adopted by the French National Education System.
