= Arthur Young (architect) =

English architect

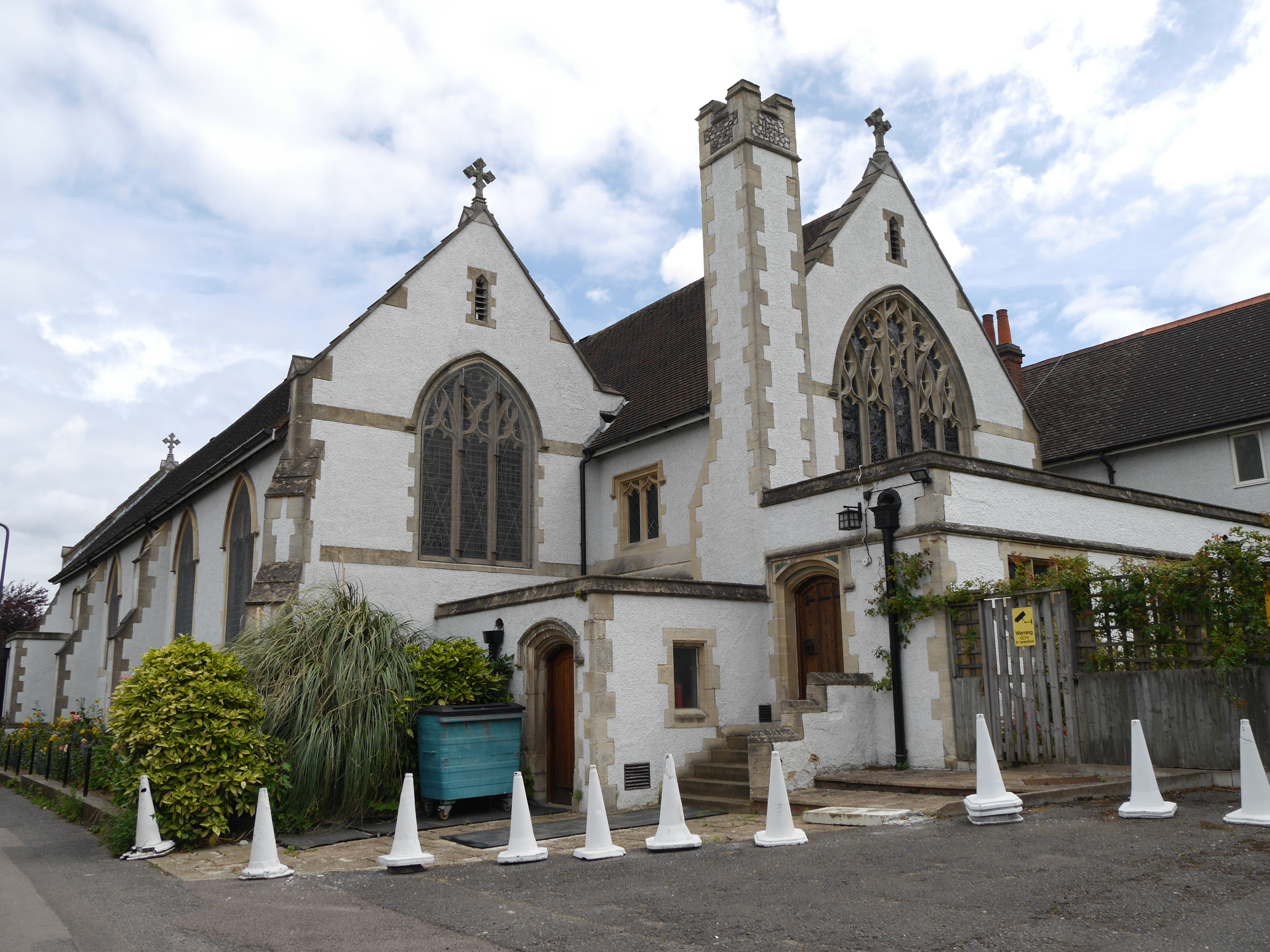
Our Lady and St Thomas of Canterbury, Harrow

Arthur Young (1853 – 22 December 1924), was an English architect, particularly of Catholic churches.

== Career ==
He was born in 1853 at Stamford, Lincolnshire, the second son of Charles Edward Young, and was educated there at Stamford Grammar School, and then studied for two years at the "Technische Schule" at St Gall in Switzerland. He was then articled to Philip Causton Lockwood, Borough Surveyor of Brighton from 1870-3, before working in the offices of E. J. Tarver; followed by the noted church architect Benjamin Ferrey; and then George Sommers Clarke between 1870 and 1879. He commenced work in London in 1877. He was working from 19 Queen Anne's Gate in Westminster in 1886 and from 5 South Square, Gray's Inn in 1914. He became a FRIBA in 1886.

== Notable buildings ==
- Our Lady and St Thomas of Canterbury, Harrow (1894)
- St Mary Magdalene, Bexhill-on-Sea (1907)
- Our Lady and St. Augustine, Rickmansworth (1909)
- St Edmund's parish chapel, Old Hall
- Dominican convent at Watford
- Convent of Our Lady of Sion
- Catholic High School, at Bayswater
- New wing at Ratcliffe College
- St Edward the Confessor Church, Golders Green
- Church of St Edmund of Canterbury and English Martyrs, Ware (1911)
- Benson Memorial Church, Buntingford (1914)
- Our Lady's, Chesham Bois
- St Dominic's, Harrow

== Literature ==
- Brodie A. (ed),(2001), Directory of British Architects, 1834–1914: 2 Vols, British Architectural Library, Royal Institute of British Architects.
