= Freman College =

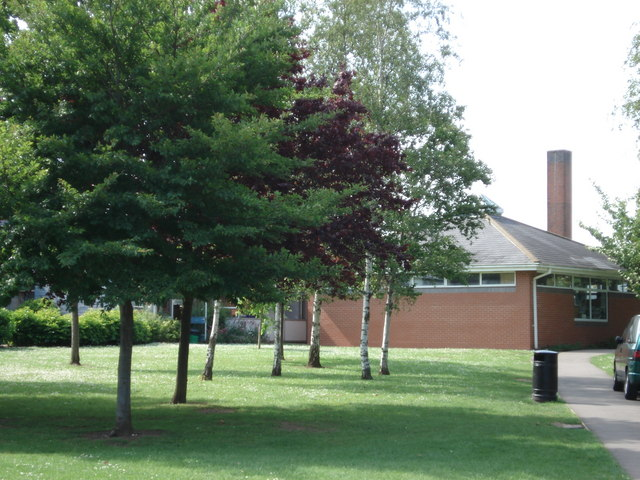

Location
- Bowling Green Lane; Buntingford, Hertfordshire, SG9 9BT; England; 51°57′05″N 0°01′40″W

Information
- Former name: Ward Freman School
- Type: Academy
- Established: 1970 or 1971
- Local authority: Hertfordshire County Council
- Department for Education URN: 137002 Tables
- Ofsted: Reports
- Chair: Jackie Martin
- Headteacher: Lisa Jones
- Staff: c. 90
- Gender: Coeducational
- Age: 13 to 18
- Enrolment: 961 as of February 2022
- Capacity: 903
- Houses: Hepworth; Butler; Moore; Mills
- Colour: Dark green
- Publication: The Word
- Affiliations: Ralph Sadleir School; Edwinstree C of E Middle School
- Website: https://www.freman.org.uk

Freman College is an upper school and sixth form with academy status in Buntingford, Hertfordshire, England. It was established as Ward Freman School in either 1970 or 1971 and became Freman College in 1999. It is named after the late Elizabeth Freman and the Freman family, who currently own the grounds of the school. Of the 788 students at the school in 2006, 198 were enrolled in the Sixth form.

== History ==
Ward Freman School was established in either 1970 or 1971, replacing Buntingford Secondary Modern School. It was named after Bishop Seth Ward and Elizabeth Freman of the Freman family as both were benefactors of Buntingford's old grammar school that closed in 1900. It had comprehensive status and originally served students aged 11 to 16, however a lack of students in the lower years led to the decision to become an upper school and sixth form serving students aged 13 to 18. No students were admitted for the two years during the transition. The first headmaster was C. Patrick Nobes. In 1975, Roger Harcourt was appointed headmaster, a position he would stay in until his retirement in 2004. Harcourt introduced a yearly tradition where a Shakespeare play would be held each December. This tradition lasted until 2003. In 1995 the school received its first Ofsted inspection and on 1 September 1999 it was renamed to Freman College. By February 2001 the school had attained community status. At the same time the school was graded as satisfactory by Ofsted, however its sixth form was graded good.

In September 2004 Roger Harcourt retired and was succeeded as head by Helen Loughran. A year later, the school was jointly designated as a specialist Humanities College with its two partner middle schools, Edwinstree C of E Middle School and Ralph Sadleir School. The school's current chair, Jackie Martin, was appointed in 2005. In 2006, Freman College became a member of the North East Herts School Sport Coordinator Partnership, becoming the coordinator of a School Sports Partnership. The school and sixth form were both graded good by Ofsted, with the school making "significant improvements in the last two years" because of new management. A curricular inspection was made in October 2007, focusing on the provision of citizenship education. In 2009 the school retained its good Ofsted grade and converted from community to foundation status. This was followed by academy status in 2011, with the school being one of the first academy converters.

Shortly after academy conversion, in January 2012, Freman yet again retained a good Ofsted grade, as did the sixth form. In March 2012 the school announced a decision to ban skirts because of concerns about skirt length. The ban was enforced from September 2013, potentially making the school the first to implement such a ban in Hertfordshire. As sixth formers do not need to wear school uniform, their dress code was unaffected. In 2015 and 2019 the school's good grade was reaffirmed by Ofsted.

== Structure ==
Freman College follows the traditional year group system found in most English schools and students are managed between these years based on their educational stage. Unlike most schools, these years are lettered A, I and E (years 9, 10 and 11). A Year stands for Admission Year, I Year for Intermediate Year and E Year for Examination Year. The sixth form is split between lower sixth and upper sixth (years 12 and 13). All students belong to one of four houses for the duration of their studies, each represented by a colour and named after a famous British sculptor. They are Butler (yellow), Hepworth (red), Mills (blue) and Moore (green). Each house is directed by a head of house and there are regular inter-house competitions in a multitude of subjects, with the overall winners each year being awarded the Sainsbury Cup (formerly the Sainsbury Trophy).

== Campus ==
Freman College is located on Bowling Green Lane in the rural town of Buntingford. The school has a car-park and there is a bus stop outside. The school itself is moderately smaller than average and has a catchment area serving the settlements of Puckeridge, Buntingford, Braughing, Anstey, Hormead and Ardeley. The school often admits students from towns beyond the catchment area, including Ware, Royston and Stevenage. The land of which the school is situated on is owned by the Freman family.

The school site contains a four-court sports hall, outdoor courts and pitches, a gym and a main hall. There is also a field outside the school. Most of these facilities can be hired outside the school day. The sports hall is named after long-time teacher Janette Wood, and cost £1.2 million to build. Outside the sports hall is a playground named in honour of the late David Lewis, who also taught at the school. A nearby tree has also been planted in his honour. Food is served at three locations in the school: the playground catering trailer outside the sports hall and two canteens, one school-wide and one sixth form. The Ward Freman Pool is located on the school site and is co-managed by East Hertfordshire District Council and Everyone Active. Swimming lessons are offered to people of all ages.

Many of these facilities are part of the school's various buildings and areas, some of which are named after relating locations or notable individuals in the school's history. They are the principal block, science block, Porthmeor art studio, West End performing arts centre, "Fort William" geography suite, Seth Ward centre, Roger Harcourt centre, Howard Carter centre and pavilion (sixth form only). Since 2005, most of these areas have been disability friendly.

== Awards and recognition ==
On 22 March 2010, the school's sixth form Amnesty International group broke the Guinness World Record for Most Demonstrations in 24 Hours. The group held 23 protests throughout Central London, beating the previous record of 21 set in 2006 by comedian and journalist Mark Thomas. Subjects included in the protests included capital punishment, maternal death and multiple violations of human rights in countries such as Iran. The group's final protest was outside 10 Downing Street, the official residence of the prime minister of the United Kingdom.

In 2015 the school was acknowledged as being one of the top 3% comprehensive state schools in England. This was due to the school's GCSE results remaining high each year.

=== Teaching awards ===
In 2014 English and PE teacher Janette Wood was awarded an MBE for educational service. Wood has been teaching at Freman College since 1976 and also leads the North East Herts School Sport Coordinator Partnership, of which the school is a member. Long-time headteacher Roger Harcourt was one of two co-recipients of the British Shakespeare Association's 2018 honorary fellowship. He was granted the fellowship alongside actress and activist Dame Vanessa Redgrave.

=== Partnerships ===
Beginning in 1971, J Sainsbury's donated £500 per annum to Ward Freman School. The donation was made because of the large amount of parents working for the company. Originally the donation was to fund environmental studies, however Headmaster Harcourt expanded its use to school trips, courses and buying a tent. The donation funded the annual Sainsbury Trophy, a trophy gifted to the best performing house every year. The trophy has since been renamed to the Sainsbury Cup, but is still awarded to the best house at the end of each academic year.

Freman College is closely affiliated with two nearby middle schools, Edwinstree C of E Middle School and Ralph Sadleir School. Students from these schools are prioritised when applying for a place at Freman. The three schools were jointly designated with specialist Humanities College status, forming strong links between each other and other local schools. Although the joint specialism appears to have been abandoned, links between the three schools have remained strong. As a result, the three schools have set up an educational "pyramid" where the two middle schools admit students from their feeder lower schools and direct them to Freman once their middle school education is complete. This pyramid is known as the Rib Valley pyramid and has combined the three schools' senior leadership teams. Inset days are held jointly between schools in the pyramid, during which teaching staff are shared.

== Notable former pupils ==
- Sam Gyimah, Liberal Democrat politician.
- Anna Williamson, television presenter.
- Nathan Tella, professional footballer.

== Headteachers ==
- Walter Baldwin (1960s) (Note: Walter Baldwin was headmaster of Buntingford Secondary Modern School, the predecessor to Ward Freman School.)
- C. Patrick Nobes (1970–1975)
- Roger Harcourt (1975–2004)
- Helen Loughran (2004–2024)

<ref name=":3" /

- Lisa Jones (2024–present)
