= Alan Bott =

English World War I flying ace

Alan John Bott
- Born: 14 January 1893; Stoke-on-Trent, Staffordshire, England
- Died: 17 September 1952 (aged 59); Westminster, London, England
- Military career
- Allegiance: United Kingdom
- Branch: British Army; Royal Air Force
- Service years: 1915–1919
- Rank: Captain
- Units: Royal Garrison Artillery; No. 70 Squadron RFC; No. 111 Squadron RAF
- Conflicts: World War I; Western Front; Sinai and Palestine campaign
- Awards: Military Cross & Bar
- Other work: Author, journalist, critic and publisher

Captain Alan John Bott MC & Bar (14 January 1893 – 17 September 1952) was a World War I flying ace who was credited with five aerial victories. He later became a journalist, editor and publisher who founded Pan Books.

== Pre-war career ==
Bott worked as journalist before and just after the outbreak of the war, serving as "special correspondent" of the Daily Chronicle, based in Basel, Switzerland. He reported on the British air raid on the Zeppelin factory at Friedrichshafen on 21 November 1914, and travelled to the Swiss town of Romanshorn, on the opposite side of Lake Constance, to observe the German response, on one occasion going out into the middle of the lake on a boat to gain a closer look.

== Military service ==
Bott returned to England in early 1915, and after training in the Inns of Court Officers' Training Corps he was commissioned as a second lieutenant (on probation) in the Royal Garrison Artillery on 22 July 1915. He was transferred to the Royal Flying Corps with the rank of lieutenant on 1 September 1916, being appointed a flying officer (observer) on 26 September.

He was posted to No. 70 Squadron RFC, flying as observer/gunner in a Sopwith 1½ Strutter with pilot Second Lieutenant Awdry Vaucour. On 24 August 1916 Bott and Vaucour were shot up and forced to land by Leopold Reimann of Jasta 1, but went on to claim three Fokker E fighter aircraft in September. On one flight, he put out an in-flight fire with his gloves; he was awarded his first Military Cross partly for this action.

Bott then trained as a pilot, being appointed a flying officer on 1 June 1917. Posted to No. 111 Squadron RFC stationed in the Sinai Desert, he was appointed a flight commander with the acting rank of captain on 22 December. Flying the Nieuport 23 bis No. B3995 he destroyed two enemy reconnaissance aircraft on 14 and 15 April 1918, but on 22 April he was shot down and taken prisoner by the Turks. Taken to Constantinople by train, Bott, accompanied by Captain Thomas W. White of the Australian Flying Corps, who had been captured in November 1915, escaped and travelled by ship to Odessa, Ukraine, then to Varna, Bulgaria, and overland to Salonika, Greece, arriving there just as the armistice was declared. He was later awarded a Bar to his Military Cross "in recognition of gallantry in escaping from captivity". Bott left the RAF after the war, being transferred to the unemployed list on 18 February 1919.

=== Awards and citations ===
Military Cross
Second Lieutenant Alan John Bott, Royal Garrison Artillery, Special Reserve (attached Royal Flying Corps).

"For conspicuous gallantry and skill. As observer he has been in many fights, and furnished many good reports. On one occasion, when his pilot was gliding back to our lines after his engine had been hit and stopped, he drove off an attacking aeroplane and put out with his hands a fire started by anti-aircraft guns. On another occasion, after driving down one hostile aeroplane, he fired at another, which dived and collided with a third. This last one fell vertically."

Bar to the Military Cross
Captain Alan John Bott, MC, Royal Garrison Artillery, Special Reserve.

"In recognition of gallantry in escaping from captivity whilst a Prisoner of War."

== Post-war career ==
Bott had written his first book An Airman's Outings, an account of the life of a British flying officer, while still serving in No. 70 Squadron in 1916. It had been published in 1917 under the pseudonym "Contact", and republished in the US as The Flying Ace and Cavalry of the Clouds. He followed it up with Eastern Nights and Flights, published in 1920, an account of his capture, imprisonment and subsequent escape. Between 1920 and 1926 he returned to journalism, as a special correspondent and as a drama critic for various newspapers.

Bott also retained his interest in flying, being granted a commission as a class "A" flying officer (on probation) in the Reserve of Air Force Officers on 22 May 1923. He was transferred to class "C" on 7 October 1924, and relinquished his commission on completion of service on 22 May 1926. On 3 June 1928 he received Royal Aero Club Aviator's Certificate No. 8309 on the DH.60 Moth at the Hampshire Aero Club.

Bott died in a hospital in Westminster, London, on 17 September 1952.

== Publications ==
- Bott, Alan (1917). An Airman's Outings. Edinburgh & London: W. Blackwood and Sons.
- Bott, Alan (1920). Eastern Flights. Edinburgh & London: W. Blackwood and Sons.
- Bott, Alan (1931). Our Fathers. London: William Heinemann.
- Bott, Alan (1947). The Londoner's England. London: Avalon Press.

== Personal life ==
Bott married Josephine Blumenfeld, daughter of Daily Express editor R. D. Blumenfeld, at Petworth in June 1930. They had three children; Simon (b. 1931), Annabel (b. 1933) and Susannah (b. 1935).

== Bibliography ==
- Shores, Christopher F.; Franks, Norman & Guest, Russell F. (1990). Above the Trenches: a Complete Record of the Fighter Aces and Units of the British Empire Air Forces 1915-1920. London, UK: Grub Street. ISBN 978-0-948817-19-9.
