= Buntingford Manor House =

18th-century building in England

Coordinates: 51.9461°N 0.0191°W

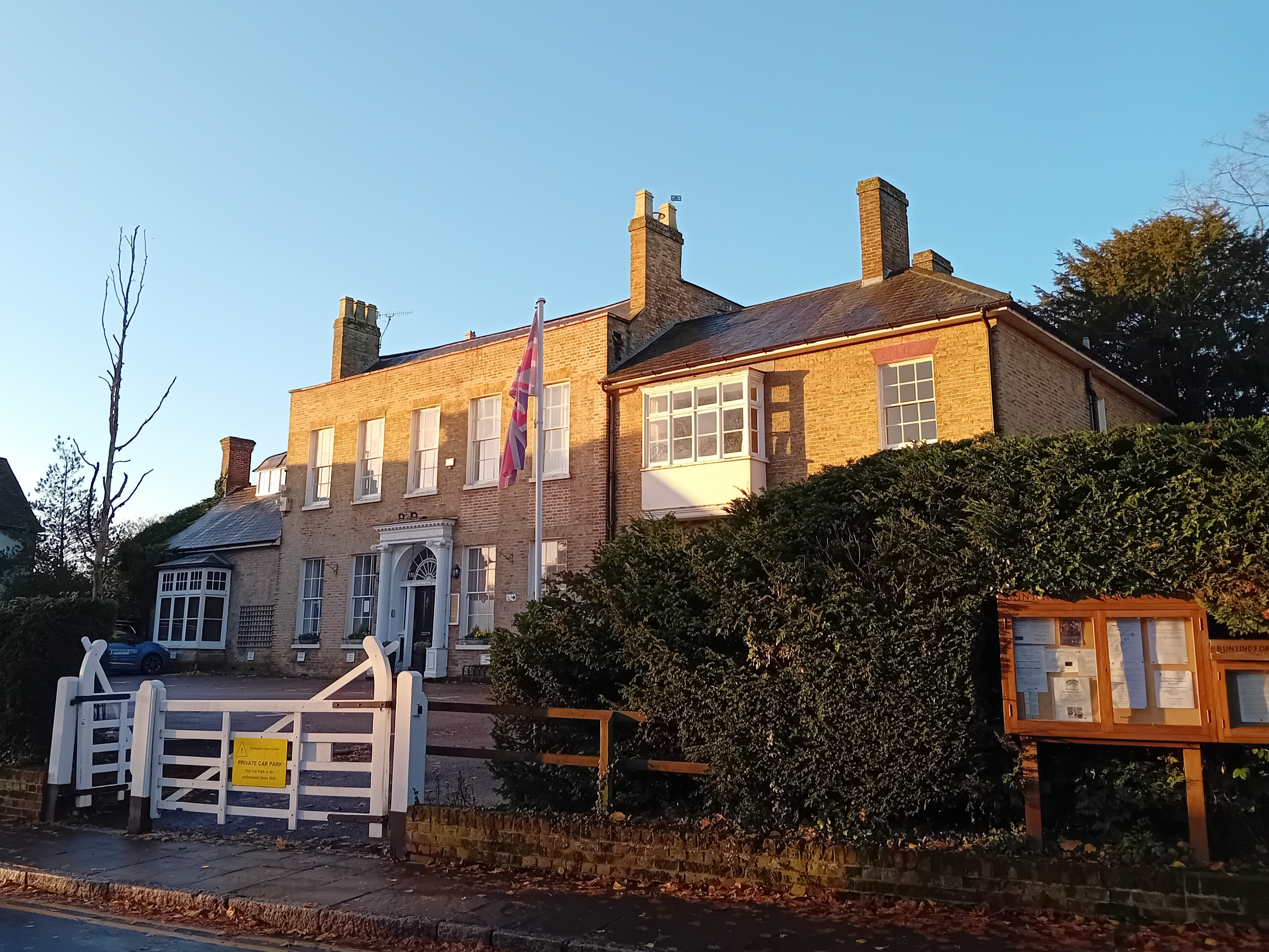
- The Manor House, Buntingford
- Interactive map of the Buntingford Manor House area

General information
- Location: Market Hill, Buntingford, United Kingdom

Technical details
- Material: Gault brick

Buntingford Manor House is an 18th-century building in the town of Buntingford, in Hertfordshire, England. It is a Grade II listed building.

== Usage ==
The house, located on Market Hill in between The Crown Public House and Barclays Bank, was originally the home of the Lord of the manor. The building was bought by Buntingford Town Council in 1996 and converted to become its headquarters. It is also used as the Buntingford Heritage Centre, where information on the history of the town can be found.
