= Planet B =

Science fiction radio drama series

- The podcast logo for Planet B
- Genre: Science fiction drama
- Running time: 30 minutes
- Country of origin: United Kingdom
- Language: English
- Home station: BBC Radio 7 Now Radio 4 extra
- Created by: Sam Hoyle; Jessica Dromgoole; Matthew Broughton; James Robinson
- Produced by: Jessica Dromgoole
- Narrated by: Adjoa Andoh
- Original release: 2 March 2009 – 27 February 2011
- No. of series: 3
- No. of episodes: 20
- Website: BBC Sci-Fi Season
- Podcast: BBC website

Planet B is a science fiction drama series first broadcast on BBC Radio 7 on 2 March 2009 as part of BBC Radio's science fiction season between February and March 2009. Planet B is set in a virtual world called "Planet B" in which people play as life-size avatars. The first series follows John Armstrong who attempts to find his girlfriend Lioba Fielding who is dead in the real world but alive in Planet B. As he travels between various worlds he becomes entangled in an array of strange scenarios, teleporting from each adventure to the next with his companion Medley, a "rogue avatar" who has no human controller. All the while, John and Medley are being watched by a dog-like antivirus programme called Cerberus who, along with the Planet B Corporation, considers the rogues to be a computer virus that need to be wiped out. In the second season, Lioba is on the run from Planet B and travels the virtual world with computer games expert Kip Berenger after they are attacked by Cerberus.

The series was created by Sam Hoyle, Jessica Dromgoole and Matthew Broughton with James Robinson. The first series ran for ten episodes and was BBC Radio 7's biggest ever commission for an original drama series. A second series of five episodes was broadcast from 29 November 2009 to 27 December. A third series of five episodes ran from 30 January through 27 February 2011.

== Plot ==
=== Series 1 ===
Lioba Fielding is one of the people behind "Planet B", a virtual world which advertises itself as: "Where you can be whatever you want to be." Planet B allows its users to download themselves onto it and play as a life-size avatar in a 3D world designed to be as realistic as possible. Planet B contains various environments, including schools, the Wild West, and Ancient Rome.

Lioba commits suicide in the real world by throwing herself off a cliff, to the distress and horror of her boyfriend John Armstrong. John then downloads himself into Planet B and enters a section called "Golden Moments" which allows him to play the best moments of his life, but a technical fault results in him being forced to constantly watch Lioba's funeral. John, along with his virtual hostess and guide Medley, discover that the problem revolves around Lioba. John then begins to see memories that are not his but Lioba's. He therefore begins to believe that Lioba is still alive somewhere in Planet B. John and Medley decide to search Planet B in an attempt to find her by jumping into a rift in the system, taking part in the various games and worlds in the system as they go along. However, when they exit the rift, John is no longer his avatar, but himself with his DNA digitised. As a result, he feels everything in Planet B for real, and if he is killed in a game, he will really die.

Unknown to them, Lioba is indeed alive in Planet B. She is currently trying to rid the network of viruses. She does this with the help of Cerberus, a vicious antivirus programme designed to look like a cerberus who destroys viruses by ripping them to shreds.

John discovers that Medley is in fact a "Rogue avatar" - an advanced form of computer virus that can think for itself. Medley makes it her mission to become more human, to protect the other rogues and to make them as equal as humans. She learns that she is to lead the rogues to freedom from the corporation behind Planet B. Cerberus however, views Medley and the other rogues as viruses that must be deleted before they destroy Planet B and wants to hunt them down. In an attempt to track them, Lioba gets rid of her "Weaker" emotions to track the rogues, as rogues use them to feel emotion themselves. John gains access to them, but when he meets the colder, crueler Lioba, he wants to kill himself. However, John and Medley always teleport to safety before he goes through with it.

Lioba's emotionless state causes her to act less rationally and as a result the corporation stop her. It is deemed that she has to be deleted. Before this happens, John manages to find her and give her back her emotions. They agree to leave Planet B and meet up in real life. However, after they do, Lioba becomes ill and goes into a hospital, where John discovers that Medley is one of the staff. John discovers that not only is he still in Planet B, but Lioba has no physical body so she cannot leave. Lioba's illness comes from a patch designed to delete the rogues. John and Medley help to cure Lioba, and they unite in order to prevent more rogues from being destroyed. Cerberus then confronts them and battles with Medley, while John and Lioba flee to safety.

=== Series 2 ===
The second series takes place some time after the events of series one. It is mentioned that John, Medley and Lioba help lead an uprising of the rogue avatars which resulted in Planet B declaring all rogues to be outlaws. Lioba has changed her appearance and voice and is currently on the run from the Planet B corporation. The whereabouts of John are unknown, and it is implied that Medley has been killed by Cerberus, who has since lost his job and is now killing both rogue and human controlled avatars as he sees fit.

A new character called Kip Berenger (Joseph Cohen-Cole) is introduced, a computer games expert who followed the uprising and is a fan of Lioba. While on a dating website in Planet B, he comes into contact with Lioba and offers his help. She is at first reluctant, but when they are both attacked by Cerberus they flee together. Kip later reveals that like Lioba he is dead in the real world.

As they travel from world to world, Lioba and Kip learn that the people behind Planet B appear to be killing people in real life for an unknown reason. There are also more people who have died in real life but still exist in Planet B, known as "Have Nots", as opposed to those who are still alive, known as "Haves". Furthermore, the real world is in chaos for several unexplained reasons.

Kip and Lioba enter a site called "The Underworld" which is akin to Greek mythology. While there Lioba turns into a Gorgon and the only way for them to escape is for Kip to turn Lioba into stone. The end of the series sees Kip crying at the realisation that he has committed murder and that he is now master of Cerberus.

=== Series 3 ===
In the third series, Mark Schwartz, the head of Planet B, announces that the original Planet B will be shut down. He claims it is to provide a new service, Planet B Platinum, but in reality the goal is to kill all the rogues in the old site.

While in an area of Planet B that simulates the Black Forest, Pip encounters a voice which turns out to be Medley. She was able to come back from the dead because when rogues die their code becomes part of Planet B. Kip and Medley travel between worlds in an attempt to find a code which will allow them access to the "reset button" that will restore Planet B to its original state. However, they are being pursued by Cerberus, who has been upgraded and become even more violent.

Kip manages to learn the code but is seemingly too late. Planet B shuts down, with the virtual world slowly being destroyed. However, they discover the reset button and attempt to enter the code. As they reach it, Schwartz appears and attempts to stop them, but he in turn is stopped by Cerberus. Cerberus helps Kip and Medley, having learned that he too is a rogue and had false memories implanted by the corporation to make him believe that he had a life outside Planet B. The code is activated and the button is pressed, resetting the whole of Planet B.

== Cast ==
Character	Season 1	Season 2	Season 3
Planet B	Adjoa Andoh	Adjoa Andoh	Adjoa Andoh
Cerberus	Chris Pavlo	Chris Pavlo	Chris Pavlo
John Armstrong	Gunnar Cauthery		Gunnar Cauthery
Medley	Lizzy Watts		Claire Harry
Lioba Fielding	Donnla Hughes	Tessa Nicholson	
Kip Berenger		Joseph Cohen-Cole	Lloyd Thomas

== Production ==
Planet B was the largest ever original drama commission for BBC Radio 7, with the first series being ten episodes long. It was broadcast as part of a science fiction season on BBC Radio. All episodes were made available for download as a podcast, and nearly 25,000 people downloaded the first series.

Broughton was the head writer for the show. Dromgoole, the series producer, described the character of John as "a real character trapped in a sci-fi. So in a sense, he is our guide into it. He's very skeptical about it and he's innocent about everything he encounters there."

James Robinson, the script editor for Planet B, said that one of the main advantages of a series such as this is that it could be set anywhere: "One week it's westerns, one week it's full-on sci-fi space operas, and that's one of the nice things about the best sci-fi concepts. I think, you know, the Doctor Who's and the Quantum Leap's, you kind of get a different show each week."

Since the budget for the show was small, the cast for Planet B was sourced from the Radio Drama Company, a repertory radio company. The Radio Drama Company's cast changed around every six months, so the cast of Planet B also changed every series.

The second series was promoted using an online binaural advert, and was also used to launch a pilot scheme of a "Series catch-up" on the BBC iPlayer.

== Reception ==
The series received mostly positive reviews. Phil Daoust from The Guardian selected Planet B as his pick of the day when the show was first broadcast. He wrote that it, "is likely to be one of those love-it-or-hate-it experiences." On 6 March 2009 Scott Matthewman from The Stage wrote: "I am shame-faced, in that I missed this intense drama serial off last week's preview. Matthew Broughton's tale of a malfunctioning virtual world is engrossing."

Ian Dunn from One Giant Leap also wrote positively: "The series has been amazingly gripping. The situation of the show allows it to be set just about anywhere, much like Doctor Who. The plot is enticing and you really care about the characters." He also commented: "One intriguing thing about the series so far is that some of the scenarios have been rather adult for a show broadcast at 6pm. One episode, set in a Roman world featured a scene in a sex dungeon. Another featured Cerberus doing what all dogs do (no matter how many heads they have) and urinate on a motorbike – well, half man-half motorbike."

== Merchandise ==
Other than the podcast, the first two series of Planet B have been made available as a purchasable download from Audible.com between the 6–7 June 2011.
