= August Neven du Mont =

German painter

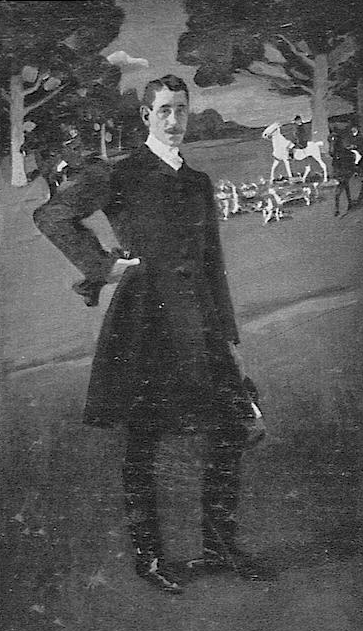
- Born: August Ludwig Mathaeus Neven du Mont; 1866; Cologne
- Died: 1909 (aged 42–43); The Manor House, Bexhill
- Education: Kunstakademie Düsseldorf
- Occupations: Painter and Master of Foxhounds
- Known for: His paintings and being the first foreign Master of Foxhounds in Britain
- Title: Junker, MFH
- Spouse: Maria Emma Josephine Hubertine von Guillaume
- Children: Mark Neven du Mont, Charles Neven du Mont and Valentine Neven du Mont
- Parent(s): August Libert Neven, (later known as Neven du Mont) and Christine Henriette Maria du Mont

August Ludwig Mathaeus Neven du Mont (1866–1909) was a German Painter, Master of Foxhounds for East Sussex and aristocrat. Very famous and popular during his lifetime he went from very successful to almost unknown after his early death in 1909. Historian Paul Clemen wrote two books about the life and work of the artist as well as one booklet which was never published. Most of Neven du Mont's Paintings were portraits for which he was most known. In July 1909, he died in his Manor House in Bexhill. He was also an ancestor of the well known German actor Sky du Mont.

== Life, career and early death ==
August Neven du Mont was born in Cologne 1866, he was one of the sons of the proprietor of the Kölnische Zeitung. He studied art in Düsseldorf and went to England because of his liking for British art. At the death of his father he was supposed to inherit the Kölnische Zeitung but refused saying that he wanted to dedicate his life to his art and until his early death, he received a monthly pension instead. Neven du Mont first went to live in Bournebouth then moved to London where he rented a town house, the Cromwell House in Cromwell Road. He married Maria von Guilleaume, the daughter of the billionaire proprietor of the Carlswerk Cable Works with whom he had three sons, Mark, Charles and Valentine who died of Tuberculosis. In 1903 he moved to Bexhill-on-Sea where he painted some of his most famous works including a painting of the Crucifixion of Jesus, currently held by St Mary Magdalene's Roman Catholic Church in Bexhill, Pierrot and Portrait of Frau Watzen, one of his best portraits. He frequently exposed at New Gallery in London. But painting was not his only passion, he was also a very good hunter and was appointed Master of the East Sussex Foxhounds in 1906. Neven du Mont became terminally ill in 1909, and died soon after on the 27th. He was the first foreign Master of Foxhounds in Britain and had acquired a reputation of grace and generosity after making many secret donations to both persons in need and museums as well as Cultural Organisations. He was a modest man, liked by all and the Bexhill Observer reported that during his funeral the streets were crowded with people.

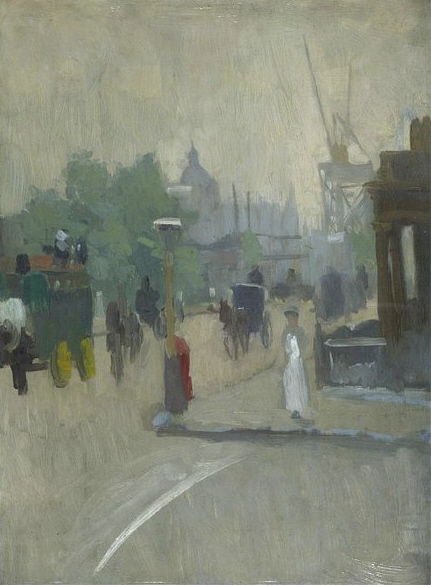
"Cromwell Road: the New Building of the Victoria and Albert Museum under Construction" (ca. 1906)

== Famous paintings ==
- Heimkehr aus dem Felde (1871)
- F. C. von Guillaume (1898)
- Selbsbildnis/Self-Portrait (1900)
- Jagdszene/"The Kill" (1903)
- Jagdszene/"The Whipper-in" (1903)
- Pierrot (1904)
- Londoner Strasse/The Victoria and Albert Museum under Construction (1906)
