= Simi Bedford =

Nigerian novelist based in Britain

- Born: Simi Bedford; Lagos, Nigeria
- Education: Durham University
- Occupation: Novelist
- Children: 3
- Writing career
- Notable work: Yoruba Girl Dancing (1991)

Simi Bedford is a Nigerian novelist based in Britain. Her 1991 debut book Yoruba Girl Dancing, an autobiographical novel about a young Nigerian girl who is sent to England to receive a private school education, was well reviewed on publication and was the subject of a BBC Radio 4 abridgement. Her second novel, Not With Silver, was published in 2007.

== Biography ==
Bedford was born in Lagos, Nigeria, to parents who had come there from Sierra Leone. Her great-grandparents were from Nigeria and were rescued from a slave ship. Bedford spent her early years in Lagos, before being sent for her education to Britain, where she attended boarding-school from the age of six.

She read law at Durham University, and subsequently worked in the media, including as a radio presenter and a television researcher. Living in London, she married and raised three children. She is now divorced from her artist husband, Martin Bedford, but they still maintain a friendly relationship, even sharing space together in a house in Devon.

=== Writing ===
Bedford's debut novel Yoruba Girl Dancing is semi-autobiographical, recounting the experience of a Nigerian girl's education in Britain, which Francine Prose described in a Washington Post review as: "[b]eautifully written ... at once acerbic and moving, painfully honest about the cost of emigration and adjustment." A five-part abridgement of Yoruba Girl Dancing (by Margaret Busby, read by Adjoa Andoh and produced by David Hunter) was broadcast on BBC Radio 4's Book at Bedtime in October 1991. The novel is extracted in Busby's 2019 anthology New Daughters of Africa.

Bedford's second novel, Not With Silver (2007), is historical fiction, focusing on mid-18th-century West Africa, slavery and court intrigue. Drawing on its author's own ancestral history, Not With Silver is unique among books about slavery in depicting the lives of people in Africa before they were enslaved. The Spectator's reviewer concluded: "This relentlessly honest book has no false or sentimental notes, absolutely no prettifying. A black warrior facing unexpected danger is taught to imagine the worst, 'look the leopard in the eye.' Simi Bedford does just that. A brave and uncomfortable labour of love."

== Bibliography ==
- Yoruba Girl Dancing, London: William Heinemann Ltd, 1991, ISBN 978-0434055579; Mandarin, 1991, ISBN 978-0749310103.
- Not with Silver, London: Chatto & Windus, 2007, ISBN 978-1856192354; Vintage (paperback), 2008, ISBN 978-0099445173.
