= Hare Street House =

House in East Hertfordshire, England

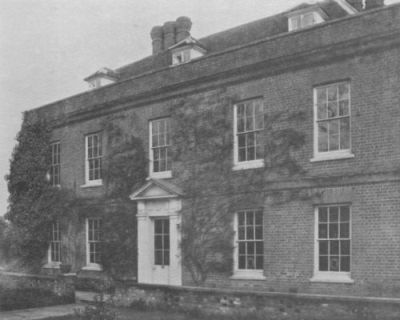
- Hare Street House in 1914

- Location within Hertfordshire

General information
- Type: Country house
- Location: Hare Street, East Hertfordshire, England
- Coordinates: 51°56′58.24″N 0°01′17″E
- Construction started: Late 16th–early 17th century
- Completed: Early 18th century (frontage)
- Owner: Private (since 2019)

Hare Street House is a Grade II* listed building in the hamlet of Hare Street that lies between Buntingford and Great Hormead in the East Hertfordshire district of Hertfordshire, England. It is mainly associated with the Roman Catholic priest and writer Robert Hugh Monsignor Benson, who owned the house from 1906 until his death in 1914.

The earliest parts of the building date from the late 16th or early 17th century. The brick frontage was added in the early 18th century, possibly for William Benn (Sheriff of Hertfordshire and Lord Mayor of London in 1747). The house was in disrepair when Benson saw it in 1903 and purchased it for "an extraordinarily low sum". Benson carried out many internal alterations, with the help of the artist Gabriel Pippet. Monsignor Benson left Hare Street House to the Archdiocese of Westminster following his death. It has been used as a country retreat for the archbishop and remained under the ownership of the archdiocese until 2019. Further restoration was carried out in 1962 for William Cardinal Godfrey who had earlier appointed the poet and mystic John Bradburne to be caretaker.

A charitable trust "to generate income for the upkeep and repair of Hare Street House" was maintained by the Archdiocese of Westminster. Cardinal Hinsley died at Hare Street House in 1943.

It was reported in 2018 that the archdiocese could no longer afford the upkeep and was putting the property up for sale. It was sold in October 2019.

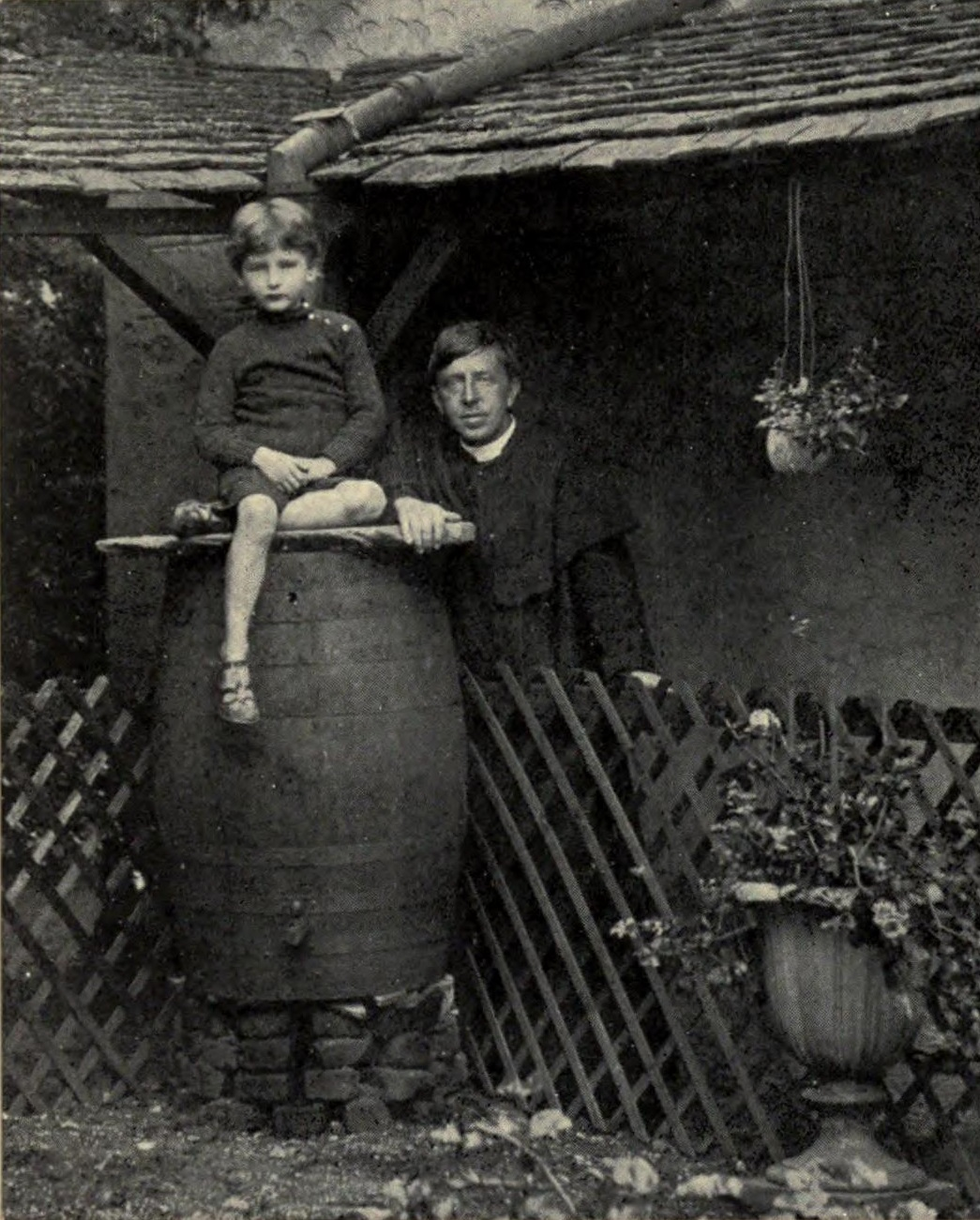
Benson at Hare Street House

A 17th century brewhouse in the grounds was converted to a chapel by Benson. This too had listed status from 13 December 1984 to 24 November 2022. It is on East Hertfordshire District Council's Heritage at Risk Register July 2021. It was destroyed by 2 storms in February 2022. The gates to the grounds are also listed. A further chapel stands in the grounds of the house, built over the former grave of Monsignor Benson and dedicated to St Hugh.

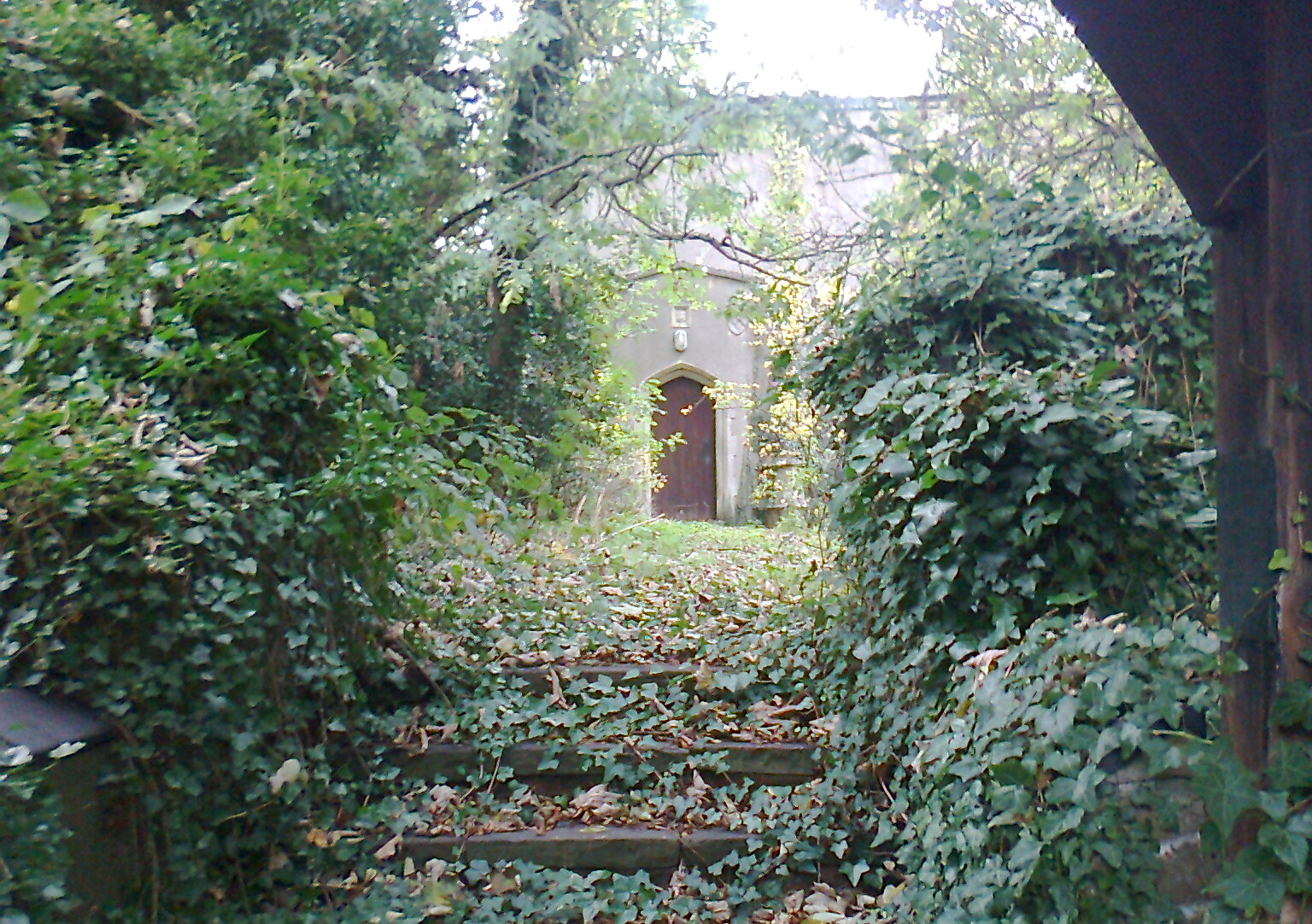
Chapel built over the former grave site of R.H. Monsignor Benson

The Benson Memorial Church, dedicated to St Richard of Chichester, is a Roman Catholic church in Buntingford. Benson helped fund construction of the church and laid the foundation stone but died before the building was completed.
