= Herbert Pigg =

English cricketer (1856–1913)

- Born: 4 September 1856. Buntingford Hertfordshire.
- Died: 8 June 1913. Manitoba, Canada.
- Education: Cambridge University.
- Occupation: Cricketer.

Herbert Pigg (4 September 1856 – 8 June 1913) was an English cricketer who played first-class cricket for Cambridge University, the Marylebone Cricket Club (MCC) and other amateur sides between 1877 and 1891. He was born at Buntingford, Hertfordshire and died in Manitoba, Canada. His twin brother, Charles Pigg, also played first-class cricket.

Pigg was educated at Abington House School, Northampton, and Emmanuel College, Cambridge. As a cricketer, Pigg was a right-handed middle or lower order batsman and a right-arm round-arm fast bowler. He was successful as a batsman in his second game for the university side, scoring 34 not out and 32 against the MCC. This led to his selection for the 1877 University Match against Oxford University, though he was not successful. He played only one further match for Cambridge University in the 1878 season.

Pigg graduated from Cambridge University in 1879 with a Bachelor of Arts degree; this was converted to a Master of Arts in 1885. He appeared in first-class cricket matches at the Hastings end-of-season cricket festival from 1886 to 1891, and these included several games in the North v South and Gentlemen v Players series, though he did not play in any of the "major" London-based fixtures. In 1886, he scored 59 and took four second innings wickets when a South team played the Australians. And in 1889 he took seven second innings wickets for 55 runs (and 11 for 112 in the match) as the Gentlemen beat the Players by one wicket. He played minor cricket for Hertfordshire from the 1870s and was the team's captain in Minor Counties matches from 1895 to 1897.
