= Our Lady and St Thomas of Canterbury, Harrow =

Roman Catholic church in London

Coordinates: 51.576470°N 0.340543°W

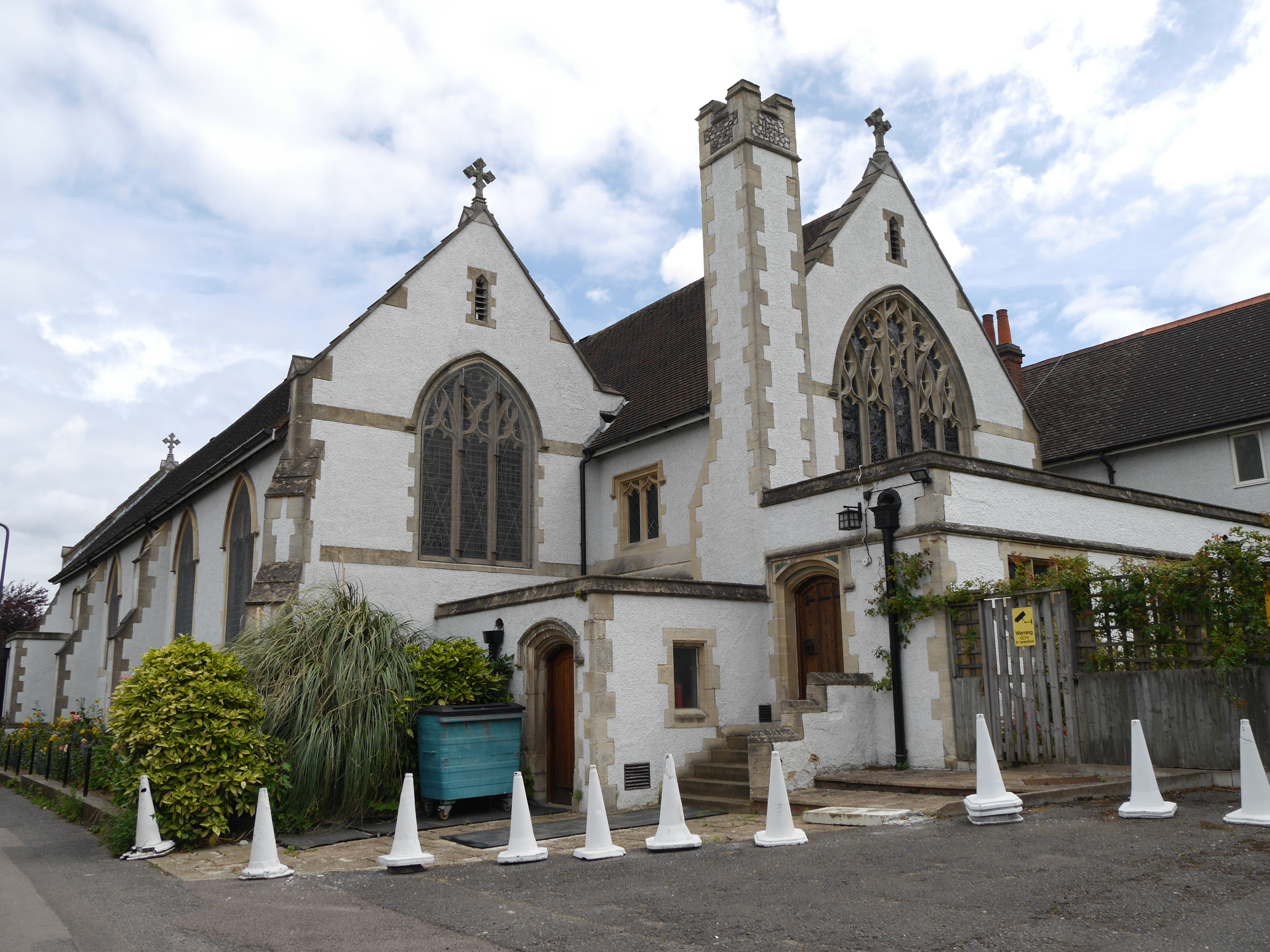
Our Lady and St Thomas of Canterbury, Harrow

Our Lady and St Thomas of Canterbury is a Grade II listed Roman Catholic church at 22 Roxborough Park, Harrow-on-the-Hill, London.

It was built in 1894 in a 14th-century style, and the architect was Arthur Young.
