= Charles Pigg =

English cricketer

Charles Pigg (4 September 1856 – 28 February 1929) was an English cricketer who played first-class cricket for Cambridge University, the Marylebone Cricket Club (MCC) and other amateur sides between 1876 and 1901. He was born at Buntingford, Hertfordshire and died at Cheltenham, Gloucestershire. His twin brother, Herbert Pigg, also played first-class cricket.

Pigg was educated at Abington House School in Northampton and at Peterhouse, Cambridge. As a cricketer he was a right-handed lower-order batsman and a right-arm round-arm slow bowler. He matriculated at Cambridge University in the autumn of 1875, but in the 1876 season his only first-class cricket match was for an England XI against the university side: he scored one run and took one wicket. He played for the university team in a handful of matches in 1877, 1878 and 1879, but at a time when the team could call upon the services of players such as A. G. Steel, A. P. Lucas and Ivo Bligh, plus a smattering of Lytteltons, he did not warrant a regular place and he was not picked for any of the University Matches against Oxford University.

Pigg graduated from Cambridge University with a Bachelor of Arts degree in 1879; this converted to a Master of Arts in 1887. He became a schoolmaster at Blairlodge School in Scotland for four years before taking up private tutoring, initially in St Leonards-on-Sea, Sussex. From 1892 to 1922, he was a private tutor in Cambridge, coaching the duller students through the rigours of Cambridge exams and, according to a reminiscence in The Times at his death, a much-loved and respected character. "I should doubt whether any coach ever had pupils more numerous, more idle, and, on the whole, more pleasant," wrote a correspondent calling himself "B. D.". "They loved him; they confided in him as to their adventures; they called him Charles; and they all felt for him complete respect as well as affection."

Pigg resumed his intermittent first-class cricket career from 1886 with occasional matches for MCC, many of them against Cambridge University, and for other amateur teams. His highest first-class score came in 1890 when he captained MCC against Cambridge at Fenner's and scored 48; he never took more than one wicket in an innings with his occasional bowling. From the mid 1890s he played regularly for Hertfordshire in the Minor Counties competition and from 1903 to 1911 he likewise appeared in Minor Counties games for Cambridgeshire, often acting as captain and sometimes with his sons, Charles and Bernard, playing alongside him. In addition to his cricket activities, he was also a keen golfer and was instrumental in securing permanent facilities for the Cambridge University Golf Club at a course near Newmarket. He retired to Cheltenham but had been present at the winter meeting of the golf club a month before his death.
