= Yoruba Girl Dancing =

1991 debut novel by Simi Bedford

- First edition
- Author: Simi Bedford
- Language: English
- Genre: Novel
- Publisher: William Heinemann Ltd
- Publication date: 1991
- Publication place: England
- Media type: Print

Yoruba Girl Dancing is a coming of age novel published in 1991 by Nigerian author Simi Bedford. It follows Remi Foster, a six year-old Yoruba girl from a wealthy family who journeys from her home in Lagos, Nigeria, to receive an education in England. Despite facing considerable discrimination in English private schools, Remi begins to identify as English rather than Nigerian, after years of living abroad.

The book is set during the 1950s and focuses on issues of identity in the postcolonial period, particularly amongst African immigrants to the western world. As Bedford's debut novel, Yoruba Girl Dancing was first published in Great Britain in 1991 (by William Heinemann Ltd) and then in the United States in 1992 (by Viking Books). It is extracted in the 2019 anthology New Daughters of Africa.

== Plot ==
The novel begins with Remi Foster, aged six, living in a upper-class family in Nigeria. Remi is surprised by her parents, who tell her she is being sent to live in an all-girls boarding-school in England. Miss Pickering, nicknamed "Bigmama" by Remi, is an Englishwoman who married into the Foster family and plans to serve as Remi's chaperone while returning to her hometown of Liverpool.

Although excited at the prospect of attending an English school, Remi is disheartened by Bigmama's proactive measures aimed at transitioning her into English society, including cutting Remi's hair short and purchasing her an oversized raincoat and hat to conceal her skin colour.

Remi and Bigmama then set sail for England on a cargo liner, where Remi meets Miss Smith, who offers to tutor Remi during the voyage. Remi feigns illness to escape Miss Smith, sneaks out of her cabin, and finds herself in the crew's cabins, where she befriends a boatswain named Mr. Lowther. She chooses to spend the remainder of the voyage socializing with the crew instead of being tutored.

Upon arriving in England, Remi meets Bigmama's sister and other family members, some of whom are reluctant to house her for the short period of time before boarding school begins. Remi soon moves into the boarding school. Though initially shunned because of her skin colour, she manages to gain the trust of her schoolmates by fabricating exotic, stereotypical tales of Africa, including pretending that her father is a chieftain.

Years pass with Remi transferring from school to school, slowly becoming culturally more English than Nigerian. Her home in Lagos becomes a distant memory and she is now more mature as well as jaded to society. She now identifies as an Englishwoman, but her skin colour still makes her an outsider in English society. She feels that she has achieved a status that would be enviable to her Nigerian peers if she ever returned to Nigeria, where she would be viewed as intriguing and "cultured". The novel ends with Remi remaining in England.

== Major characters ==
Remi Foster - A Nigerian girl sent at the age of six to attend a boarding school in England, Remi is the titular protagonist and narrator. The novel follows her from childhood to adulthood, chronicling her education within several English private schools, her experiences staying with various English families, and her eventual return to Nigeria. Remi is smart, sharp and well educated, though somewhat naïve due to her age, particularly in the first half of the novel. During her stay in England, she grapples with cultural indoctrination and racial bigotry, as well as her peers’ views of stereotypes of black Africans.

Miss Pickering / "Bigmama" – An Englishwoman who married into the Foster family, Miss Pickering — known to Remi as Bigmama — helps to prepare Remi for life in England. Bigmama, who married a Nigerian man, has experienced at first hand the racial and cultural conflict present in post-colonial England. Knowing full well that a Nigerian child will face racial discrimination in London, Bigmama does her best to groom young Remi for English society. Though well-meaning, her efforts often come off as callous to the reader.

Miss Smith – A short, youthful English woman who "tutors" Remi on board the ship to Liverpool. Miss Smith berates Remi for wandering the ship unattended, dismisses the young girl's intelligence, and generally serves as a nuisance to Remi during the voyage.

Mr Lowther – A boatswain on the cargo liner to Liverpool, Mr Lowther forms an unlikely friendship with the protagonist. He shows Remi around the ship and its crew quarters, remarking that only the two of them can "move freely" between the cargo liner's dual worlds. Kind and considerate, Mr Lowther serves as a foil to the unsympathetic Miss Smith.

Remi's parents – Absent for most of the novel, Remi's parents first appear only to send Remi off to England for an education. They meet with Remi once again, much later, this time bringing along Remi's younger sister, Aduke, and younger brother, Tunji. As head of an upper class Nigerian family, Remi's father's behaviour in public is a frequent source of shock for English strangers.

Families – During her stay in England, Remi houses with many different families, all of them acquaintances of the Foster family. In general, these families are a source of discontent for Remi, who feels out of place and unwanted in their homes, particularly later in the novel.

Aduke – Remi's younger sister, who serves as a foil to Remi in the final quarter of the novel. While Remi has decided, by this point in the narrative, that excessive flattery and charm is the best method by which to deal with new English families, Aduke refuses to assume such false identities. She views Remi's efforts to charm strangers and conform to English culture as not only vain but embarrassing.

== Themes ==
=== Race ===
Race is an important theme in Yoruba Girl Dancing as it is perhaps the largest obstacle facing the main character. During Remi's time in Lagos, race is less evident as an issue, since almost everyone she has contact with is black; however, there are a few key moments during which the reader begins to understand the role of race in Nigeria. Remi and her family are distinguished as unique and wealthy because they live in an area where mostly wealthy expatriates and white people reside. Furthermore, the fact that the inclusion of a white woman from England in their family is such an affront to Remi's conservative grandmother shows that the stigma of race goes both ways, not just of white people towards black people.

However, this is turned on its head once Remi arrives in England. Before going to boarding-school, she spends time in London with her white step-grandmother, Bigmama, and some of her relatives. Remi takes a liking to these people and asks to see them during her school breaks but it is made clear that her white “Aunt” is uncomfortable with this because of what others will think of a white woman serving as the guardian for a black girl. Remi faces more of such prejudice once she arrives at school. The white women running the school have little sympathy for the six-year-old and the harshness of the transition she is facing as a young Nigerian girl coming to a posh boarding-school where she is not only the single African but the only black girl. Furthermore, the school uniform is referred to as being "nigger" brown, and the girls she must share living quarters with are under the assumption that her blackness is contagious.

By the end of the novel Remi comes to the satisfying conclusion that, despite all the strife she has faced in Britain, she is in fact British. She is able to overcome her internal issues regarding race and firmly declare herself within one of the two realms that she has always straddled.

The total effect of the many moments in the novel concerning race is to inform the reader of exactly how severe the stigma of blackness in 1950s London was, one that no amount of money or education would allow a black person to completely escape.

=== Socio-economic class ===
When the reader is introduced to Remi, she is living with her wealthy grandparents in Lagos, Nigeria. They have a large, colonial style home with multiple floors and servants, who live in separate quarters on the grounds. Wealth isolates Remi from those around her. Her maids, close to her in age but different in their means and class, are the nearest things she has to friends, yet there is always a level of disconnect among them, made more evident when Remi takes a trip to the marketplace with one of the servants. Remi is taunted by other girls for her English-style clothes.

When six-year-old Remi makes the trip from Nigeria to England, she stays with some relatives of her step-grandmother, Bigmama. Remi immediately notices that they do not have servants and the woman of the house does the housework herself. Remi assumes that they are poor. Following her stay in London with these distant relatives, she goes to boarding-school with other affluent girls. However, because of her race, these girls do not believe she could possibly have lived a lavish lifestyle in Nigeria and she is isolated from her classmates.

The divide that socio-economic status causes in Remi's life underscores her constant feeling of isolation. She is never among those who are like her, and in order to adapt to the rifts caused by her race and socio-economic class, she must develop into a strong and somewhat cynical young woman.

=== Colonialism ===
Coming from a wealthy family in colonial Lagos, Remi lives in a European-influenced African culture. She lives in a large house with servants as part of the Nigerian upper class for whom British culture is the dominant influence.

Colonization by the British impacts Remi and her family. Remi conforms to European beauty standards, wishing she looked like European actresses. She wears English clothes. Early on in the novel, she makes the mistake of wearing her English clothes to the market, where she runs into girls who are not of the same class as she and are wearing traditional African clothes. They corner her and tease and harass her for following what the Europeans do and letting them colonize her even more.

Remi going to boarding-school in England is another representation of colonialism and the British influence over Africa. Her wealthy family believes that being educated in Europe is a way for Remi to better herself.

== Cultural references ==
The story in Yoruba Girl Dancing of Remi Foster's eventful journey to London from Nigeria closely relates to the life of author Simi Bedford, who experienced a similar childhood. In addition to being partially autobiographical, the novel also alludes to other books, singers, and aspects of culture that proved to have an influence on the writing of Yoruba Girl Dancing.

When Remi auditions for her school choir, she turns out to be an awful singer, and after the audition the teacher perplexed says: "I assumed you would have a beautiful voice like Paul Robeson, like all your people" (125). Such gross generalizations recur elsewhere in the book, as Remi struggles to achieve equality with her classmates.. One classmate, Anita, convinces the other girls that Remi's skin colour rubs off (86). Such incidents plague Remi's early life in the foreign country.

Towards the end of the novel, Remi compares her life to that of Shakespeare's Othello. In the Tragedy of Othello, Desdemona's father could not fathom why she would love a black man. When talking to her friend Phoebe, Remi notes of her teacher: "I’m sure he thinks I’m using some kind of voodoo to woo the language to me in the same way Brabantio accused Othello of using spells on Desdemona" (172). Remi realizes that she has spent her whole life trying to become an Englishwoman, just as Othello attempted to become a Venetian, before ultimately committing suicide. She concludes that she has lost sight of who she once was. At this moment, she is aware that she will never be fully accepted in English society. Despite the friendships made while studying abroad, there will always be people who stare at her and question her upbringing and race.

In the book's last pages, as Remi is dancing with her friends and family, her life comes full circle. She is once again with her native culture, after experiencing the difficulties of living in a foreign country, and is completely content. The final line of the novel states: "Is there a sight more beautiful, the older women said, than a Yoruba girl dancing?" Remi's genuine happiness to be reunited with her mother, brothers, sisters, and friends shows through her exotic, cultural dancing.

== Reception and reviews ==
Publishers Weekly emphasises the racial issues that Yoruba Girl Dancing addresses: "...she is deposited at the upper-crust Chilcott Manor School (where the uniform tunic is 'nigger brown')... [the] family must endure the scrutiny and derision of her classmate, one of whom spreads the word that 'the black rubs off'..." The review concludes: "Bedford, a native of Nigeria who moved to Britain as a child and now lives in London, has written a wise and provocative book that might even prompt some soul-searching in the social circles she has skewered." Kirkus Reviews′ description said: "Funny, touching debut .... Evocative story of coming-of-age, cultural transformations, and continuities."

Barnes & Noble: Editorial Reviews – "From the Critics": Janet Ingraham enjoyed the book, however, felt that it was hurried and "faltered" towards the end. Ingraham seemed to love Remi, but not Bedford, "the sympathetic, witty narrator and the issues her story raises recommend this flawed but pleasing, exuberant novel."

The Washington Post review by Francine Prose, in September 1992, said:

"...given the increasing frequency with which political boundaries are being redrawn and the resultant mushrooming of refugee populations, the novel of the future may well be the novel of immigration: fictions in which characters are relocated to alien lands and forced to contend with a dizzying array of new obstacles and perils, from innocent crosscultural misunderstanding to flat-out jingoist hysteria.

If the coming decades do in fact bring a wave of such novels, Simi Bedford's appealing, witty and intelligent Yoruba Girl Dancing is very much in advance of the landing. ... Beautifully written, Yoruba Girl Dancing is at once acerbic and moving, painfully honest about the cost of emigration and adjustment."

=== Radio abridgement ===
In October 1991, a five-part abridgement of Yoruba Girl Dancing (by Margaret Busby, read by Adjoa Andoh and produced by David Hunter) was broadcast on BBC Radio 4's Book at Bedtime.
