= Benson Memorial Church =

Catholic church in Hertfordshire

Coordinates: 51°56′40.27″N 0°01′6.26″W

St Richard of Chichester, Buntingford
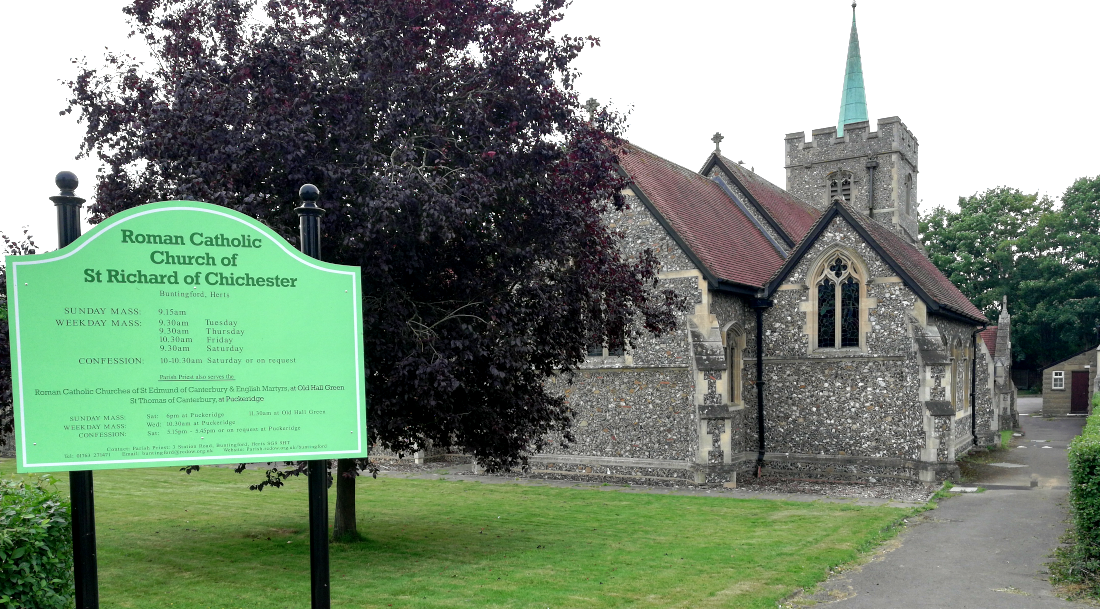
- Exterior view of St Richard's Buntingford as seen from the main road
- St Richard of Chichester, Buntingford
- Denomination: Roman Catholic
- Website: rcdow.org.uk

History
- Dedication: St Richard of Chichester
- Consecrated: 5 June 1940

Architecture
- Heritage designation: Grade II
- Architect: Arthur Young
- Style: Modern Gothic

Specifications
- Capacity: 160

Administration
- Diocese: Westminster
- Deanery: Lea Valley

Clergy
- Priest: John Cunningham

The Benson Memorial Church, dedicated to St Richard of Chichester, is an English Roman Catholic church in the Hertfordshire town of Buntingford. Its name derives from the notable priest and author Robert Hugh Benson who lived locally at Hare Street House and helped fund construction of the church. Benson laid the foundation stone but died before the building was completed. The parish currently shares a parish priest with the Catholic churches in Puckeridge and Old Hall Green.

== History ==
The church was built in 1914 by Arthur Young in the Gothic style and is Grade II listed as a building of special architectural or historic interest. It was opened in January 1915. The Lady chapel was added in 1916 and the porch in 1934. The 45-foot tall tower, surmounted by a 35-foot copper spire was added in 1939. The church was consecrated in 1940 by the auxiliary bishop of Westminster, Edward Myers.

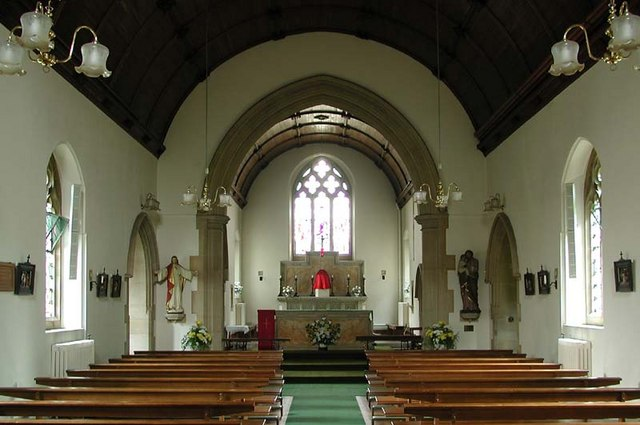
Interior of the church
