= Buntingford =

Market town in Hertfordshire, England

Coordinates: 51.9445°N 0.0160°W

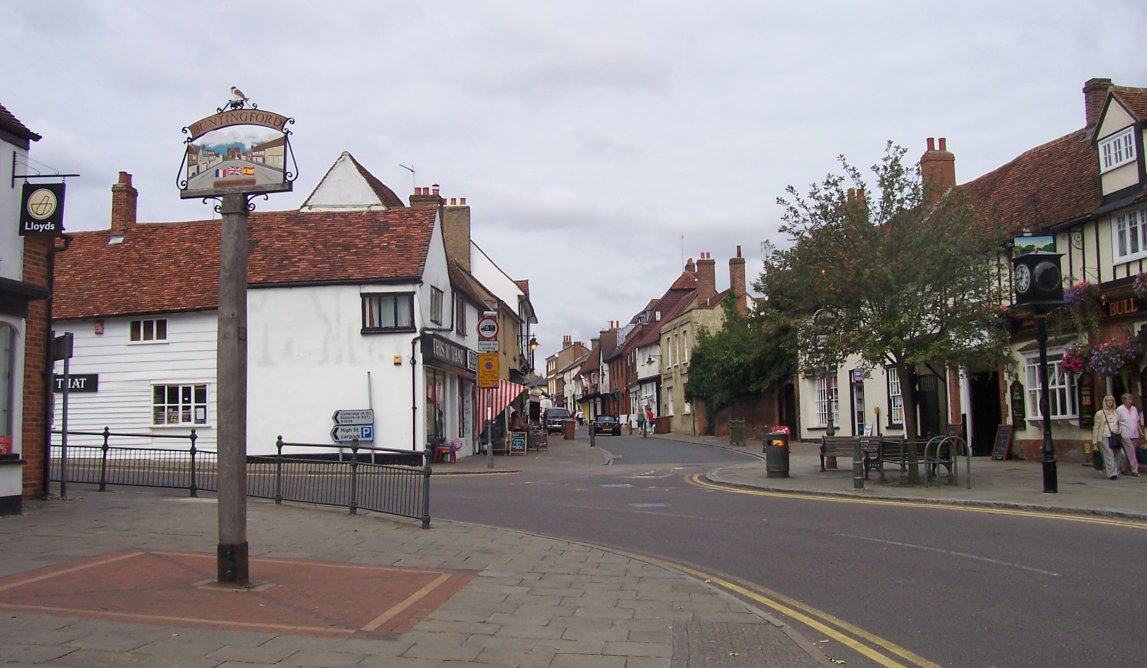
- Buntingford

- Location within Hertfordshire
- Population: 7,989 (Parish, 2021); 7,875 (Built up area, 2021)
- OS grid reference: TL363292
- Civil parish: Buntingford
- District: East Hertfordshire
- Shire county: Hertfordshire
- Region: East
- Country: England
- Sovereign state: United Kingdom
- Post town: BUNTINGFORD
- Postcode district: SG9
- Dialling code: 01763
- Police: Hertfordshire
- Fire: Hertfordshire
- Ambulance: East of England
- UK Parliament: North East Hertfordshire

Buntingford is a market town and civil parish in the East Hertfordshire district of Hertfordshire, England. It lies next to the River Rib and is located on the historic Roman road, Ermine Street. As a result of its location, it grew mainly as a staging post with many coaching inns and has an 18th-century one-cell prison known as The Cage, by the ford at the end of Church Street. At the 2021 census, the parish had a population of 7,989 and the built up area had a population of 7,875.

== Name ==
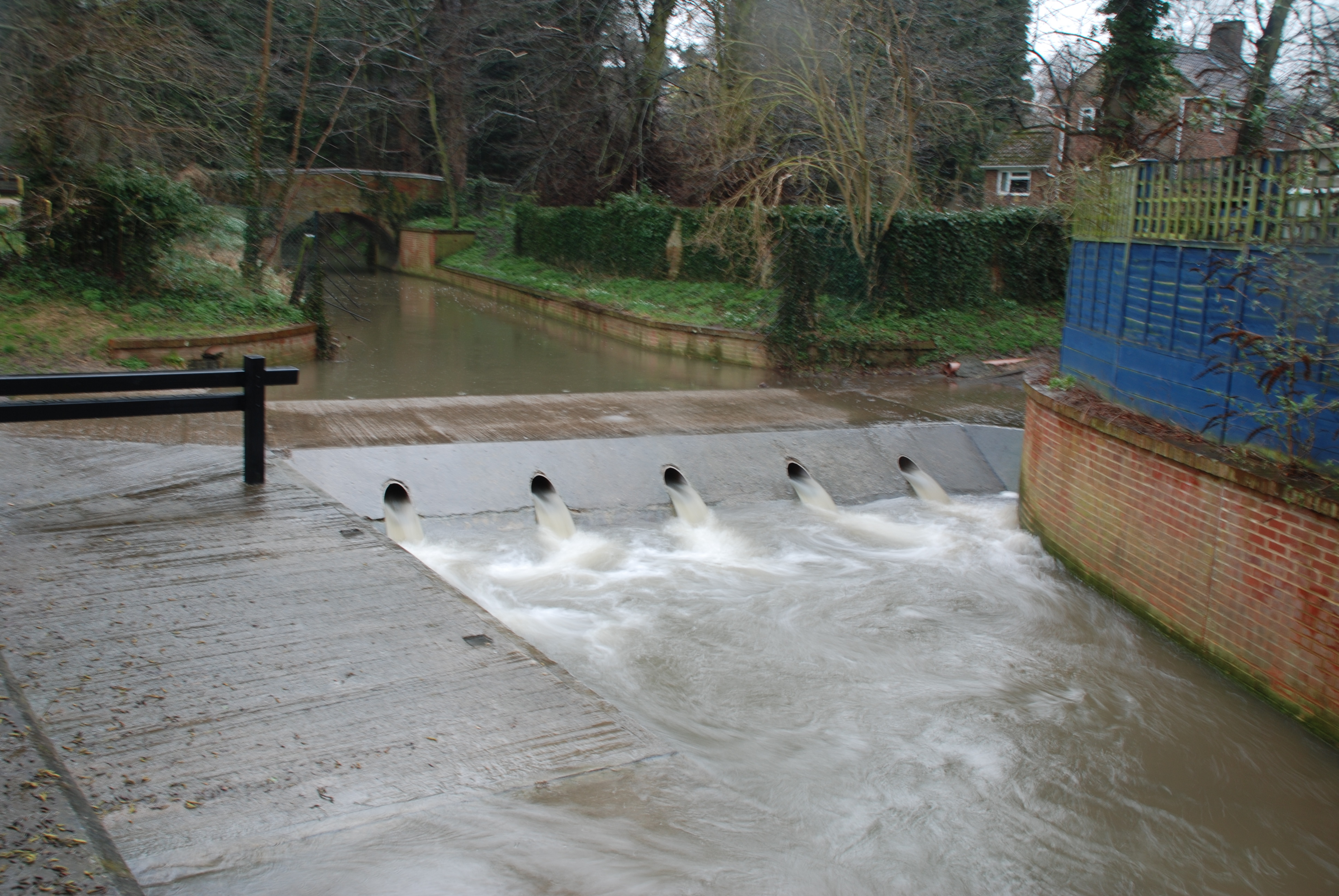
The ford in Buntingford that gives it its name

Despite popular belief, the name of Buntingford does not come from the bunting bird. Instead, it probably originates from the Saxon chieftain or tribe Bunta and the local ford running over the River Rib. Buntingford was the name of the ford and its surrounding areas, with Bunting being the name of a village located six miles to its north, which is translated from Old English as "place or people of Bunta". The earliest forms of the name Buntingford are Buntas Ford and Buntingeford, both of which date back to 1185. The modern form Buntingford dates back to 1255. (Note: Other forms historically used include Bontingford, Buntiford, Buntyngeford and Bountyngeford.) This roughly translates to "Ford of the people of Bunta".

== History ==
Buntingford was first recorded in an 1185 Knights Templar land document. Henry III designated it a market town by royal charter in 1253. Elizabeth de Burgh, 4th Countess of Ulster, relocated her market in Chipping to Buntingford in 1360, under permission from Edward III. She then gave the market to the town's residents, turning it into one of England's first community owned markets.

Buntingford was located traditionally within the parish of Layston – St Bartholomew's Church (Layston), previously derelict and now a house, lies about half a mile to the north-east of the town. St Peter's Church, formerly a relief chapel, is the Anglican church in Buntingford and is an almost unique brick building from the age of the 17th-century Puritans. St Richard's serves the Roman Catholic community. There is also a United Reformed Church in Baldock Road. Queen Elizabeth I is claimed to have stayed at Buntingford in a building now called the Bell House Gallery, on a coach journey to Cambridge. Just up the High Street, The Angel Inn, now a dental surgery, was a staging post for coaches travelling from London to Cambridge. The town has an annual firework display at The Bury, presented by Buntingford Town Football Club. The Prime Meridian passes to the east of Buntingford. The town has many Georgian and medieval buildings, such as Buntingford almshouses, Buntingford Manor House and the Red House. Buntingford was a stop-over on what was the main route between London and Cambridge, now the A10.

== Governance ==
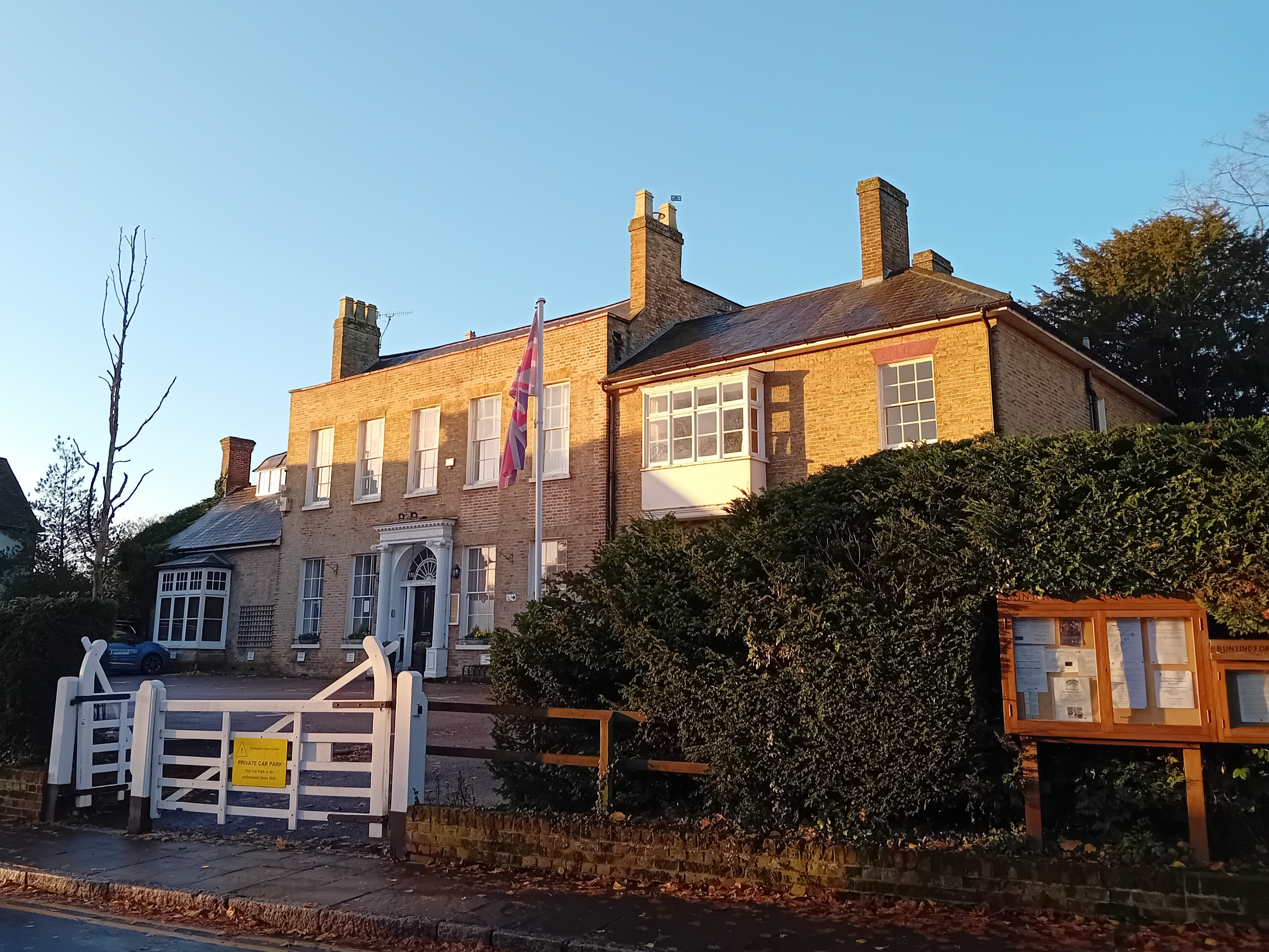
Buntingford Manor House, 21 High Street

There are three tiers of local government covering Buntingford, at parish, district, and county level: Buntingford Town Council, East Hertfordshire District Council, and Hertfordshire County Council. The town council is based at the Manor House, a converted 18th century house at 21 High Street.

For national elections, the town forms part of the North East Hertfordshire constituency.

=== Administrative history ===
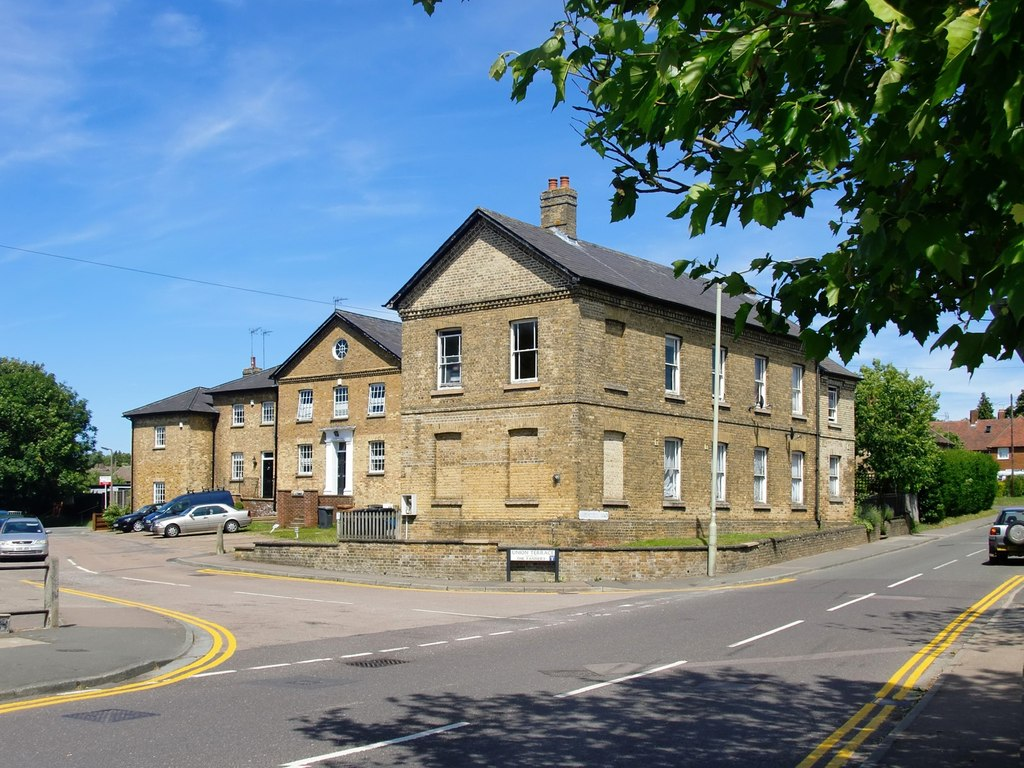
Bridgefoot House, Union Terrace: Built 1837 as the Buntingford Union Workhouse

Buntingford was historically mostly in the ancient parish of Layston, but parish boundaries around the town were complex, and parts of the town lay within the neighbouring parishes of Aspenden, Throcking, and Wyddial. In 1835, the Buntingford Poor Law Union was established, being a group of 16 parishes which collectively administered their functions under the poor laws. The union built a workhouse off Hare Street Road in Buntingford in 1837, later called Bridgefoot House.

Poor law unions subsequently formed the basis for the rural sanitary districts created in 1872, which in turn formed the basis for the rural districts created in 1894. Buntingford Rural District was abolished in 1935 when most of its area, including Buntingford itself, was merged with Hadham Rural District to form the Braughing Rural District. At parish level, Buntingford continued to straddle Layston, Apsenden, Throcking and Wyddial until 1937, when a new parish of Buntingford was created, covering most of the old Layston parish, which was abolished, and also taking in areas ceded from the other three parishes.

Braughing Rural District was in turn abolished in 1974 when the area became part of East Hertfordshire. As part of the 1974 reforms, parish councils were given the right to declare their parishes to be a town and take the title of town council, which Buntingford Parish Council took, becoming Buntingford Town Council. The town council bought the Manor House in 1996 to serve as its headquarters.

== Culture ==
Market day is Monday, and early closing Wednesday. The Buntingford Cougars (youth grassroots) Football Tournament is held every year at The Bury, drawing in teams from around the area. There is also a classic car show held in the town each year, on the first Saturday in September. The town has a number of public houses – The Fox and Duck, The Black Bull and The Crown. The 'World Sausage Tossing Championship' has taken place at The Countryman Inn, in Chipping near Buntingford, every August since 2014.

== Transport ==
Buntingford railway station, opened in 1863, was closed in 1964, under the Beeching cuts. This was the terminus for the Buntingford Branch Line. Recently it has been redeveloped into housing.

Current public transport provision consists of an hourly bus service, route 331 to Hertford operated by Arriva Herts & Essex.

== Economy ==
Buntingford is home to various independent shops, restaurants and pubs mainly located in the town's high street. Buntingford has a Co-op food supermarket and a Sainsbury's Local. Just outside the town are two fuel stations one at each end of the bypass. One is operated by BP, the other by Esso that opened in 2022. The town was previously home to the Sainsbury's Anglia Distribution Centre, but this was vacated and eventually knocked down for housing in 2014. The site had previously been used as a Royal Army Ordnance Corps munitions factory, known locally as "the Dump". Team BMR and Triple Eight Racing, two major UK auto racing teams, were based in the town.

== Education ==
Buntingford is one of two towns in Hertfordshire using a three-tier school system (the other being Royston). In this system, children are educated in first schools until they enter middle school in Year Five, after which they join upper school in Year Nine, remaining there until the completion of sixth form. This system was enacted in Buntingford in 1969 by order of the county council.

=== First and middle schools ===
There is currently one middle school and two first schools, with a third opening in September 2023:

- Layston Church of England First School is a mixed Church of England first school with voluntary controlled status, situated at The Causeway, Buntingford. It is under the jurisdiction of the Diocese of St Albans and was preceded by two schools: Buntingford National School for Boys and Adams' Memorial School for Girls & Infants, opening in 1845 and 1879 respectively. Layston has had an Ofsted grading of outstanding since 2009 and has a pupil population of 149, with a capacity for 150.
- Millfield First and Nursery School is a mixed community first school with nursery education, situated at Monks Walk, Buntingford. The school has had an Ofsted grading of outstanding since 2009 and has a pupil population of 341, with a capacity for 352. Animals, including a dog, are included in the school's staff team.
- Buntingford First School (BFS) is a new mixed first school with academy status that was first planned to open on the grounds of Edwinstree C of E Middle School in September 2022, before moving to its own building at London Road, Buntingford, in Easter 2023. It will now open in September 2023 in its own building. The school is part of the Scholars Education Trust and is expected to be Hertfordshire's first net zero school. It will have a pupil capacity of 300.
- Edwinstree Church of England Middle School is Buntingford's only middle school. It is a mixed Church of England voluntary controlled school situated at Norfolk Road, Buntingford, under the jurisdiction of the Diocese of St Albans. Edwinstree has had an Ofsted grading of good since 2018, previously being graded as requiring improvement since 2016 and, before that, outstanding since 2008. It has a pupil population of 477, with a capacity for 480.

=== Secondary education ===
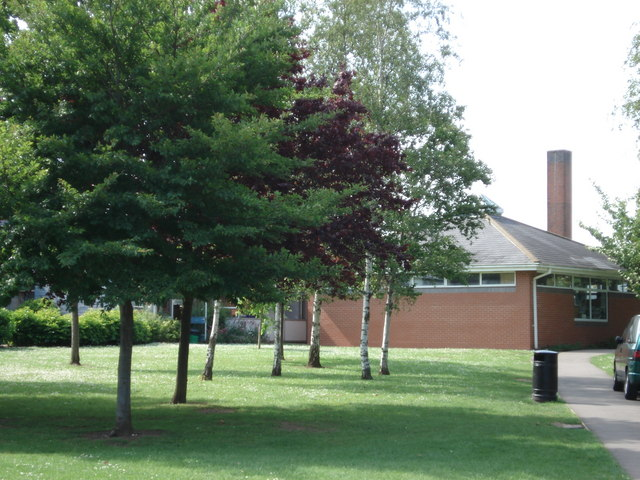
Freman College pictured in 2007

Buntingford currently has one upper school, Freman College (formerly Ward Freman School). The school is a mixed upper school and sixth form with academy status, situated at Bowling Green Lane, Buntingford, under the control of its own single-academy trust. It was established in either 1970 or 1971 as an 11 to 16 comprehensive school, replacing the Buntingford Secondary Modern School which was established between both world wars. It was named after Bishop Seth Ward and Elizabeth Freman of the Freman family as both were benefactors of Buntingford's old grammar school that closed in 1900. Previously a foundation school, Freman converted to academy status in 2011, being one of the first schools to do so. It has had an Ofsted grading of good since 2006 and has a student population of 961, with a capacity for 903.

A grade II listed house situated at Layston Court 20, High Street, was formerly used as the building and master's house for Buntingford Grammar School until 1877. Buntingford Grammar School was Buntingford's first secondary school, having been built by its endower, Elizabeth Freman, between 1630 and 1633 for 25 schoolboys and a master. It was a two-storey building, with the attic being added at a later date sometime before 1830. The school was endowed again in 1684 by former pupil Seth Ward, who had become the Bishop of Salisbury, and Lady Jane Barkham. After its disuse in 1877, the building was modified into a house. The Town Council took ownership of the rest of the school's site and have preserved it as a park. The school itself survived elsewhere until 1900.

== Notable people ==
=== Athletes ===
- Twin first-class cricketers Herbert and Charles Pigg (1856–1913 and 1929 respectively) were born in Buntingford.
- Professional footballer Nathan Tella (born 1999) went to Edwinstree C of E Middle School and Freman College.

=== Bishops ===
- Archbishop of Westminster Arthur Hinsley (1865–1943) died at his country retreat, the Hare Street House, which is located between Buntingford and Great Hormead.
- Bishop of Gloucester and Bristol James Henry Monk (1784–1856) was born in Buntingford.
- Bishop of Salisbury Seth Ward (1617–1689) was a pupil and benefactor of Buntingford Grammar School and gave his name to Ward Freman School.

=== Politicians ===
- Liberal Democrat and former Conservative politician Sam Gyimah (born 1976) did his GCSEs and A-Levels at Freman College.
- Liberal Party politician Walter Wren (1833–1872) was born in Buntingford and went to school there.
- Local politician Harold Herbert Williams (1880–1964) lived in Buntingford.
- Alderman and merchant John Watts (1554–1616) was born in Buntingford.

=== Others ===
- The music hall and pantomime performer Ouida MacDermott (1889–1980) lived and died at Nevetts Old People's Home in Buntingford.
- Television presenter and dating agent Anna Williamson (born 1981) went to Freman College.
- Sculptor Reginald Butler (1913–1981) was born in Buntingford.
- Inventor and engineer William Stanley (1829–1909) lived in Buntingford.
- British Indian Army officer and engineer Sir Frederick Abbott (1805–1892) was born in Buntingford.
- South Australian magistrate and newspaper editor Jefferson Stow (1830–1908) was born in Buntingford.

== Twin towns ==
Buntingford is twinned with:

- Luynes, France
- Ólvega, Spain

== Media ==
Local news and television programmes are provided by BBC East and BBC London on BBC One, and by ITV Anglia and ITV London on ITV1. Television signals are received from either the Sandy Heath or Crystal Palace TV transmitters. Local radio stations are BBC Three Counties Radio and Heart Hertfordshire. The town is served by the local newspaper, Hertfordshire Mercury (formerly The Buntingford and Royston Mercury).

=== Other media ===
The Beehive, a pub situated at Hare Street, Buntingford, is featured in the 1981 television adaptation of The Hitchhiker's Guide to the Galaxy radio series. It reappears in the series' 2005 film adaptation as the Horse and Groom, which is named the "last pub in the world".

== See also ==
- The Hundred Parishes
