= Solomon Riemann =

Solomon Riemann (died c. 1873) was a European Jewish traveler. An account of his travels, Mas'ot Shelomoh, based on Riemann's own notes, was written by Wolf Schur and published in 1884.
