= British Shakespeare Association =

The British Shakespeare Association is a professional association of teachers, researchers, theatre practitioners, community workers and other professions who work with the plays of William Shakespeare. Since its foundation in 2002 the BSA has run six international conferences: at De Montfort University, Leicester, at Newcastle University, at the University of Warwick, at King's College London, at the University of Liverpool, at Lancaster University and at the University of Stirling.

The BSA's patron is Dame Judi Dench. The British Shakespeare Association has its own journal, Shakespeare, which is published four times a year online and once a year in print.
