= Leopold Reimann =

German flying ace

Leopold Rudolf Reimann
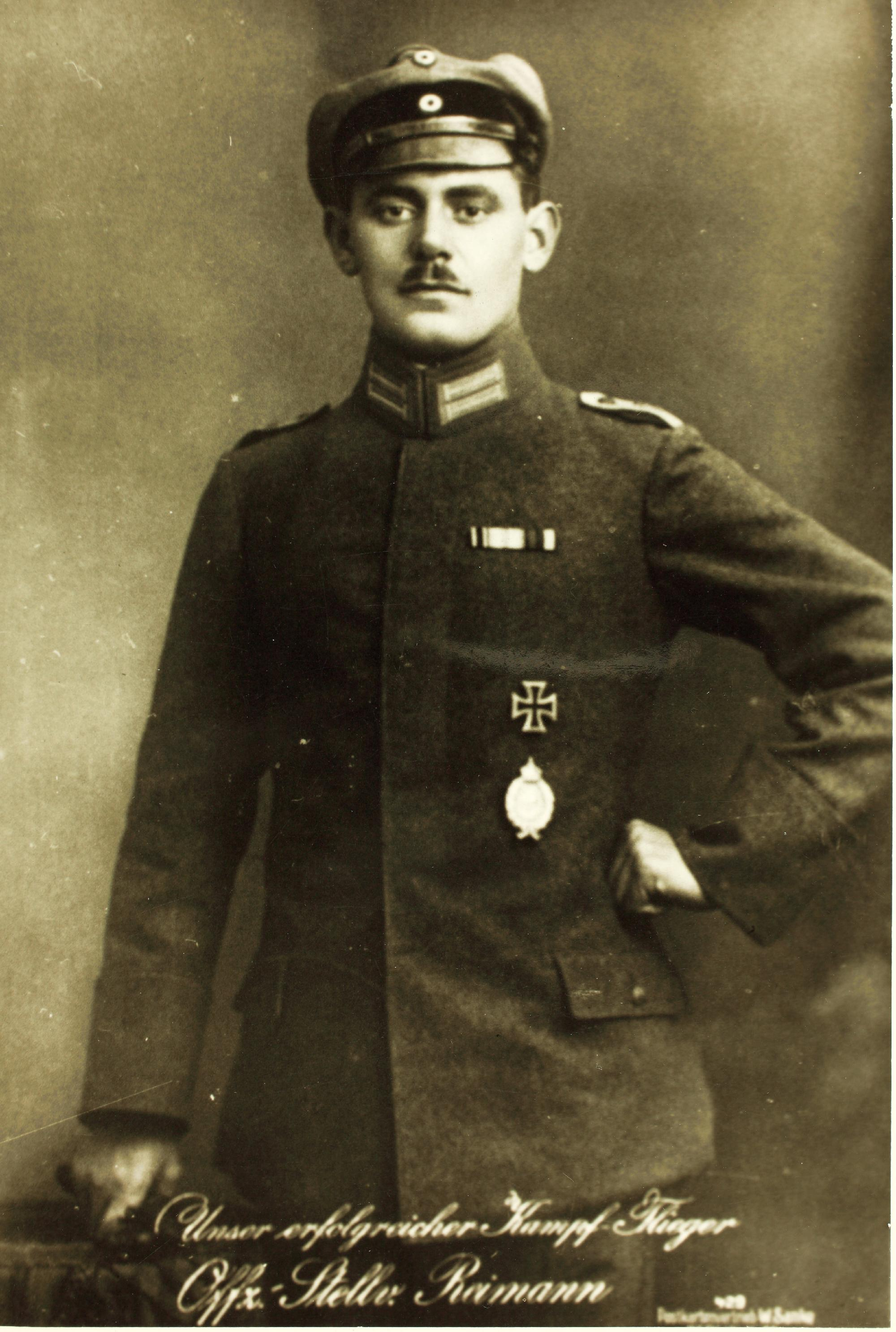
- Born: 7 December 1892; Oberhohnsdorf, Kingdom of Saxony, Germany
- Died: 24 January 1917 (aged 24); Valenciennes, France
- Military career
- Allegiance: German Empire
- Branch: Flying service
- Service years: 1914-1917
- Rank: Offizierstellvertreter
- Units: Kampfeinsitzerkommando B (Combat Single-Seater Command B); Jagdstaffel 1 (Fighter Squadron 1); Jagdstaffel 2 (Fighter Squadron 2),
- Awards: Iron Cross First and Second Class

Offizierstellvertreter Leopold Rudolf Reimann was a World War I flying ace credited with five aerial victories.

== Biography ==
See also Aerial victory standards of World War I

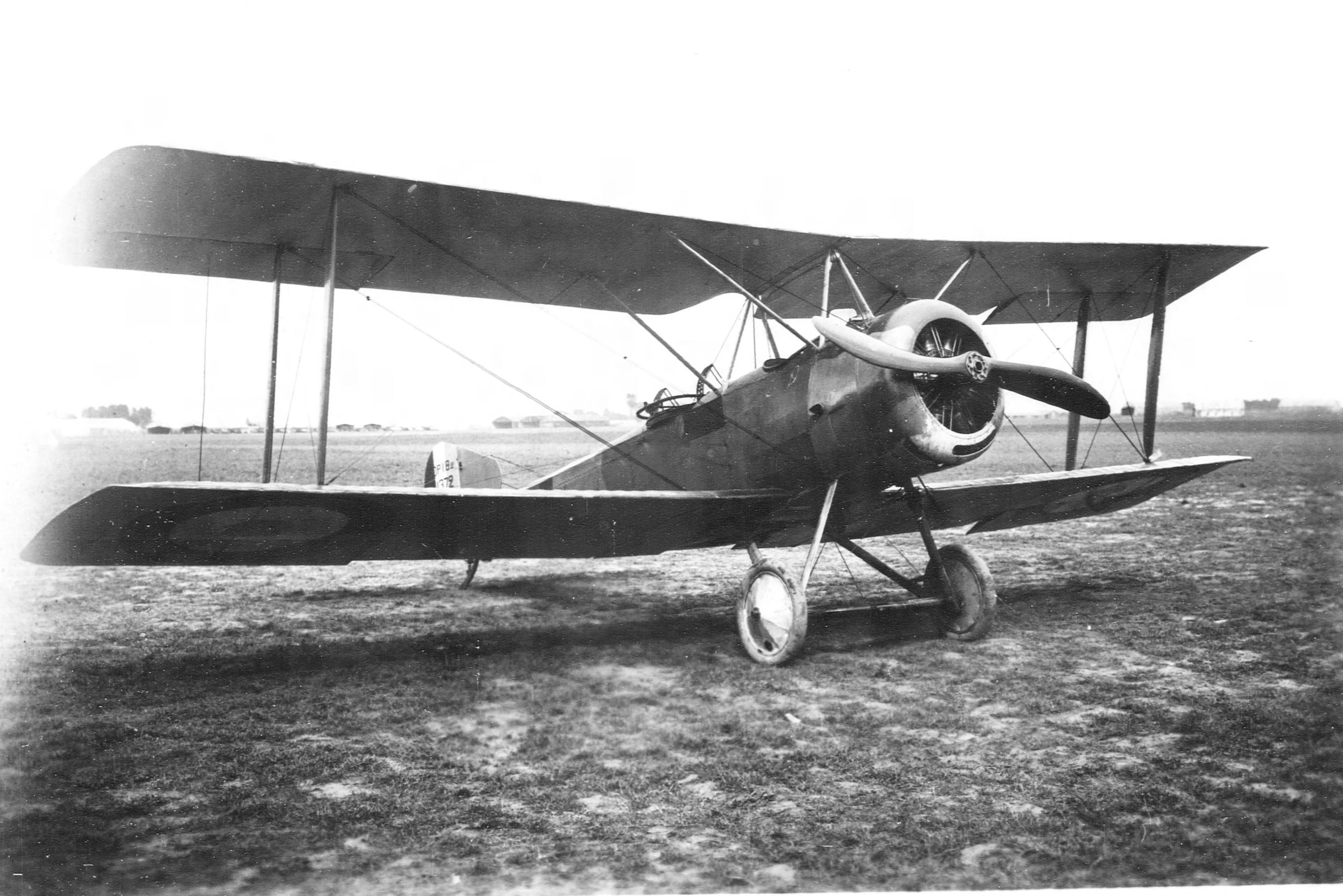
A Sopwith Strutter was Reimann's first victim.

Leopold Rudolf Reimann was born at Oberhohnsdorf, Kingdom of Saxony, Germany on 7 December 1892.

Reimann joined a pioneer battalion at the start of World War I, winning an Iron Cross Second Class on 30 August 1914. In Spring 1915, he was wounded in action. In June, he was awarded the Silver Military Order of St. Henry. He then transferred to aviation duty. While his training is unknown, he was posted to fly one of the world's original fighter planes, the Fokker Eindekker, as a member of a pioneering fighter organization, Kampfeinsitzerkommando B (Combat Single-Seater Command B). On 30 June 1916, he was shot down, but survived uninjured. As Kampfeinsitzerkommando B was augmented to become Jagdstaffel 1 (Fighter Squadron 1), Reimann continued to fly for them. He shot down a Sopwith 1 1/2 Strutter on 24 August for his first aerial victory. On 1 September, he transferred to the equally new Jagdstaffel 2; on the 10th, he received the First Class Iron Cross. During September and October 1916, he would claim six more aerial victories, four of which were verified. He was wounded during his last successful dogfight on 22 October.

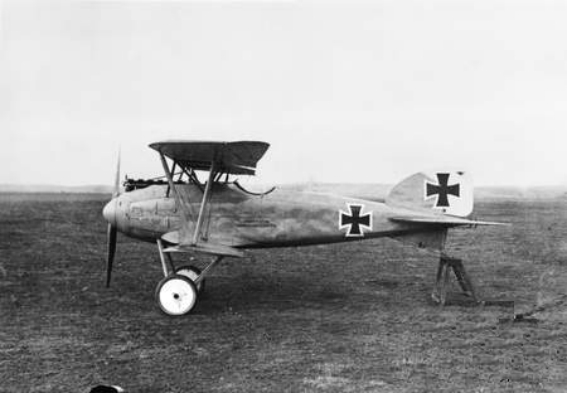
Reimann's assigned aircraft was an Albatros D.III fighter.

On 31 December 1916, Reimann married. Shortly thereafter, he began fighter training at Valenciennes, France. On 24 January 1917, while in flight, his Albatros D.III shed its wings and Reimann fell to his death.
