= Arthur Percival =

British Army officer

Lieutenant-General Arthur Percival CB DSO* OBE MC DL
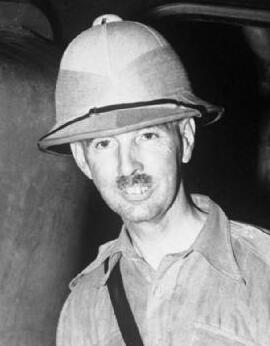
- Percival in 1941
- Born: 26 December 1887; Aspenden, Hertfordshire
- Died: 31 January 1966 (aged 78); Westminster, London
- Spouse: Margaret Elizabeth MacGregor Greer (m. 1927; died 1953)
- Children: Dorinda Margery Percival (daughter); Alfred James MacGregor Percival (son)
- Military career
- Allegiance: United Kingdom
- Branch: British Army
- Service years: 1914–1946
- Rank: Lieutenant-General
- Service number: 8785
- Units: Essex Regiment; Cheshire Regiment
- Commands: Malaya Command (1941–1942); 44th (Home Counties) Infantry Division (1940–1941); 43rd (Wessex) Infantry Division (1940); 2nd Battalion, Cheshire Regiment (1932–1934); 7th (Service) Battalion, Bedfordshire Regiment (1918)
- Conflicts: First World War: Battle of the Somme; German spring offensive; Russian Civil War: North Russia Campaign; Anglo-Irish War; Second World War: Malayan Campaign; Battle of Singapore (surrendered)
- Awards: Companion of the Order of the Bath; Distinguished Service Order & Bar; Officer of the Order of the British Empire; Military Cross; Mentioned in Despatches (3); Croix de guerre (France)

Chinese name
- Traditional Chinese: 白思華
- Simplified Chinese: 白思华
Transcriptions
Standard Mandarin
- Hanyu Pinyin: Báisīhuá
Yue: Cantonese
- Jyutping: baak6 si1 waa4

Lieutenant-General Arthur Ernest Percival, CB, DSO & Bar, OBE, MC, DL (26 December 1887 – 31 January 1966) was a British Army officer. He saw service in the First World War and built a successful military career during the interwar period, but is best known for his defeat in the Second World War, when Percival commanded British Commonwealth forces during the Malayan campaign, which culminated in a catastrophic defeat at the Battle of Singapore.

Percival's surrender to the invading Imperial Japanese Army, which was the largest of its kind in British military history, significantly undermined Britain's prestige and military position in East Asia. Some historians, such as Sir John Smyth, have argued that under-funding of British Malaya's defences and the inexperienced, under-equipped nature of the Commonwealth forces in Malaya, not Percival's leadership, were ultimately to blame for the defeat.

== Early days ==
=== Childhood and employment ===
Arthur Ernest Percival was born on 26 December 1887 in Aspenden Lodge, Aspenden near Buntingford in Hertfordshire, England, the second son of Alfred Reginald and Edith Percival (née Miller). His father was the land agent of the Hamel's Park estate and his mother came from a Lancashire cotton family. By 1891 the family was living in nearby Thundridge at "Sprangewell" on Poles Lane, his father being listed as "Land Agent" in the 1891 census, although it is unclear if this is still for Hamel's Park, or for E.S. Hanbury's Poles estate (now "Hanbury Manor"), which is adjacent to Sprangewell.

Percival was initially schooled locally in Bengeo. Then in 1901, he was sent to Rugby with his more academically successful brother, where he was a boarder in School House. A moderate pupil, he studied Greek and Latin but was described by a teacher as "not a good classic". Percival's only qualification on leaving in 1906 was a higher school certificate. He was a more successful sportsman, playing cricket and tennis and running cross country. He also rose to colour sergeant in the school's Volunteer Rifle Corps. However, his military career began at a comparatively late age: although a member of Youngsbury Rifle Club, he was working as a clerk for the iron ore merchants Naylor, Benzon & Company Limited in London, which he had joined in 1914, when the First World War broke out.

=== Enlistment and First World War ===
Percival enlisted on the first day of the war as a private in the Officer Training Corps of the Inns of Court, at the age of 26, and was promoted after five weeks' basic training to temporary second lieutenant. Nearly one third of his fellow recruits would be dead by the end of the war. By November Percival had been promoted to captain. The following year he was dispatched to France with the newly formed 7th (Service) Battalion of the Bedfordshire Regiment (later the Bedfordshire and Hertfordshire Regiment), which became part of the 54th Brigade, 18th (Eastern) Division, in February 1915. The first day of the Battle of the Somme (1 July 1916) left Percival unscathed, but in September he was badly wounded in four places by shrapnel, as he led his company in an assault on the Schwaben Redoubt, beyond the ruins of Thiepval village, and was awarded the Military Cross (MC), the citation for which reads:

For conspicuous gallantry in action. During the advance he showed fine leadership and determination under heavy shell and machine-gun fire. He worked unceasingly, with absolute disregard of danger, in completing every detail in the consolidation of the captured position.

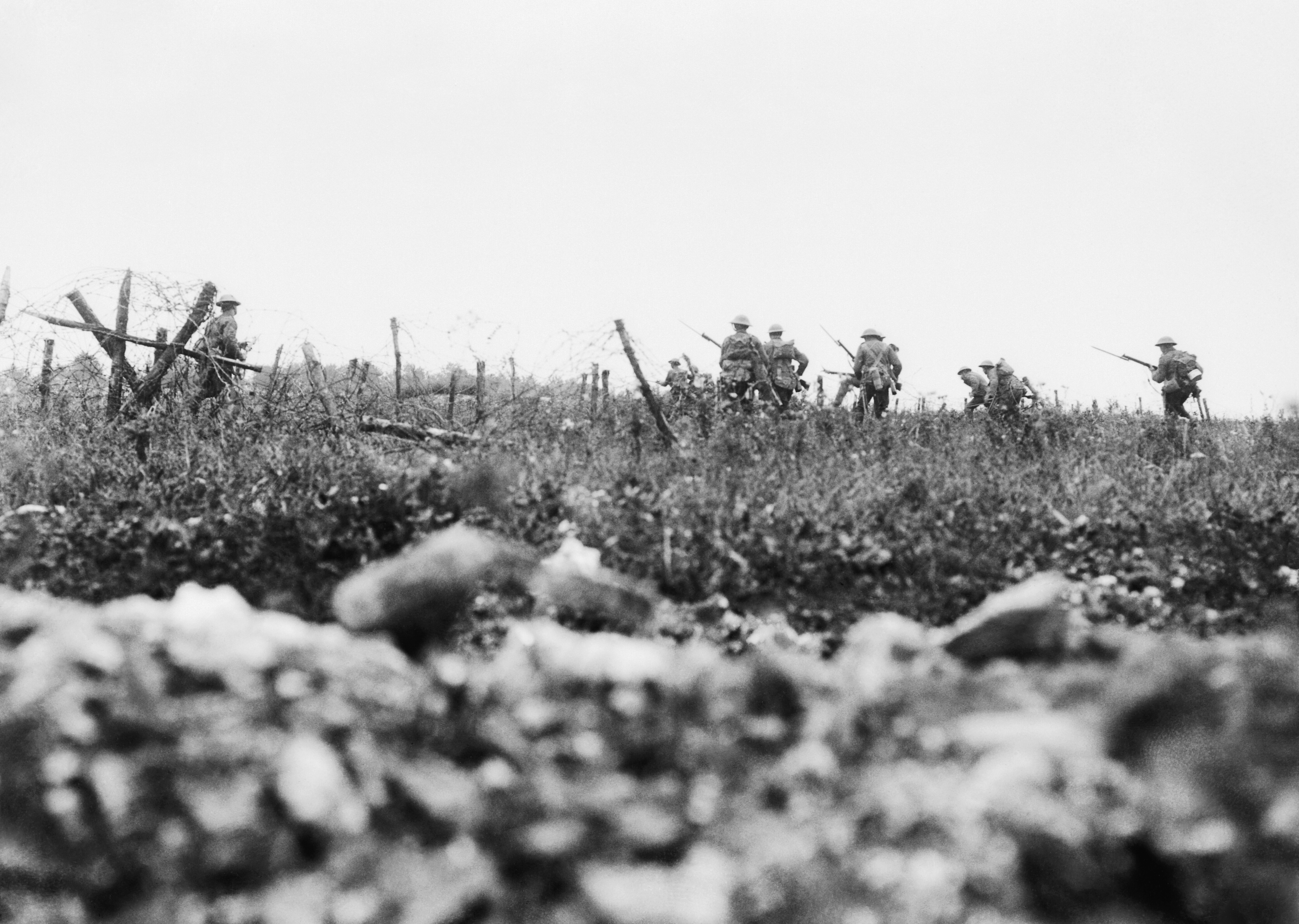
Near Thiepval, 7 August. Photo by Ernest Brooks.

Percival took a regular commission as a captain with the Essex Regiment in October 1916, whilst recovering from his injuries in hospital. He was appointed a temporary major in his original regiment. In 1917, he became a battalion commander with the temporary rank of lieutenant-colonel. During Germany's Spring Offensive, Percival led a counter-attack that saved a unit of French artillery from capture, winning a Croix de Guerre. For a short period in May 1918, he acted as commander of the 54th Brigade. He was given brevet promotion to major, and awarded the Distinguished Service Order (DSO), with his citation stating the following:

For conspicuous gallantry and devotion to duty during recent operations. He handled his battalion cleverly, showing power of command and knowledge of tactics. He set a fine example during several critical periods.

He ended the war, which came to an end on 11 November 1918 due to the Armistice with Germany, as a respected soldier, described as "very efficient" and was recommended for the Staff College.

== Interwar period ==
=== Russia ===
Percival's studies were delayed in 1919 when he decided to volunteer for service with the Archangel Command of the British Military Mission during the North Russia intervention of the Russian Civil War. Acting as second-in-command of the 45th Royal Fusiliers, he earned a bar to his DSO in August, when his attack in the Gorodok operation along the Northern Dvina resulted in the British capture of 400 Red Army troops. The citation reads:

He commanded the Gorodok column on 9–10 August 1919, with great gallantry and skill, and owing to the success of this column the forces on the right bank of the Dvina were able to capture all its objectives. During the enemy counter-attack from Selmenga on Gorodok he handled his men excellently. The enemy were repulsed with great loss, leaving 400 prisoners in our hands.

=== Irish War of Independence ===
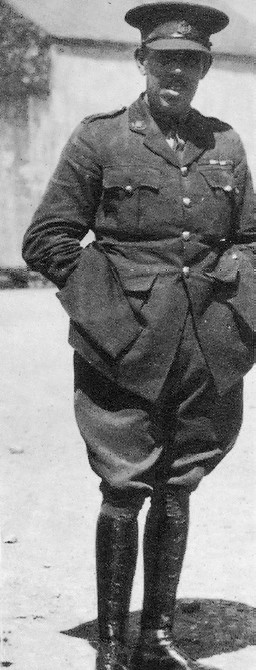
Percival in Ireland

In 1920, Percival was deployed to Ireland and fought against the Irish Republican Army (IRA) during the Irish War of Independence, first as a company commander and later as the intelligence officer of the 1st Essex Regiment. He was stationed in Bandon and Kinsale in County Cork. In December 1920 the Commander in Chief of British forces in Ireland (Nevil Macready) informed the British Cabinet that "official reprisals" had been authorized in areas under martial law. Percival proved to be an energetic counterinsurgency commander who was noted for his aptitude for intelligence-gathering and establishment of bicycle infantry formations which acted as flying columns. He was also accused by several IRA prisoners of using torture during interrogations. As a result, Percival became one of the most hated British commanders in Ireland at the time and survived three assassination attempts by the IRA. The IRA had promised a £1,000 reward to whoever captured or killed Percival.

Following the IRA killing of a Royal Irish Constabulary sergeant outside a Bandon church in July 1920, Percival captured Tom Hales, the commander of the IRA's 3rd Cork Brigade, and Patrick Harte, the brigade's quartermaster, for which he was given an OBE. Both Hales and Harte subsequently claimed they had been tortured while in custody, and according to IRA commander Tom Barry, Harte received a severe blow with a rifle butt to his temple causing a brain injury and died in a mental hospital in 1925 as a result. British intelligence officer and later British fascist Ormonde Winter subsequently alleged that Hales had informed on the IRA while in British custody and had invented his allegations to deflect attention away from his decision to provide the names of fellow IRA members in return for a lesser sentence.

On 4 February 1921, while participating a raid carried out by British forces between Bandon and Kilbrittain, Percival shot and killed IRA volunteer Patrick Crowley Jr. When Crowley, who was being treated for appendicitis, tried to flee from a house in Maryboro, Percival chased him on foot and shot him in the back. Barry later wrote that Percival was "easily the most vicious anti-Irish of all serving British officers". David Lloyd George and Winston Churchill met Percival in 1921, when he was called as an expert witness during an inquiry into the Irish War of Independence.

Percival would later deliver a series of lectures on his experiences in Ireland in which he stressed the importance of surprise and offensive action, intelligence-gathering, maintaining security and co-operation between different security forces. Historian J. B. E. Hittle wrote that of all the British officers in Ireland "Percival stood out for his violent, sadistic behaviour towards IRA prisoners, suspects and innocent civilians... He also participated in reprisals, burning farms and businesses in response to IRA attacks. Percival was said to regularly drive in the countryside in an open touring car so he could "have cockshots at farmers working in the fields". It is possible that Percival was influenced by the then British Army Captain Bernard Montgomery who wrote to Percival regarding tactics he used to combat the Irish rebels: "My own view is that to win a war of this sort, you must be ruthless. Oliver Cromwell, or the Germans, would have settled it in a very short time. Clifford Kinvig, Percival's biographer considers him to have been unfairly vilified by Irish republican propaganda due to being "tireless in his attempt to destroy the spirit of the people and the organisation of the IRA".

=== Staff officer ===
Percival attended the Staff College, Camberley, from 1923 to 1924, which had Major-General Edmund Ironside as its Commandant, where he was taught by J. F. C. Fuller, who was one of the few sympathetic reviewers of his book, The War in Malaya, twenty-five years later. He impressed his instructors, who picked him out as one of eight students for accelerated promotion, and his fellow students who admired his cricketing skills. Following an appointment as major with the Cheshire Regiment, he spent four years with the Nigeria Regiment of the Royal West African Frontier Force in West Africa as a staff officer. He was given brevet promotion to lieutenant-colonel in 1929.

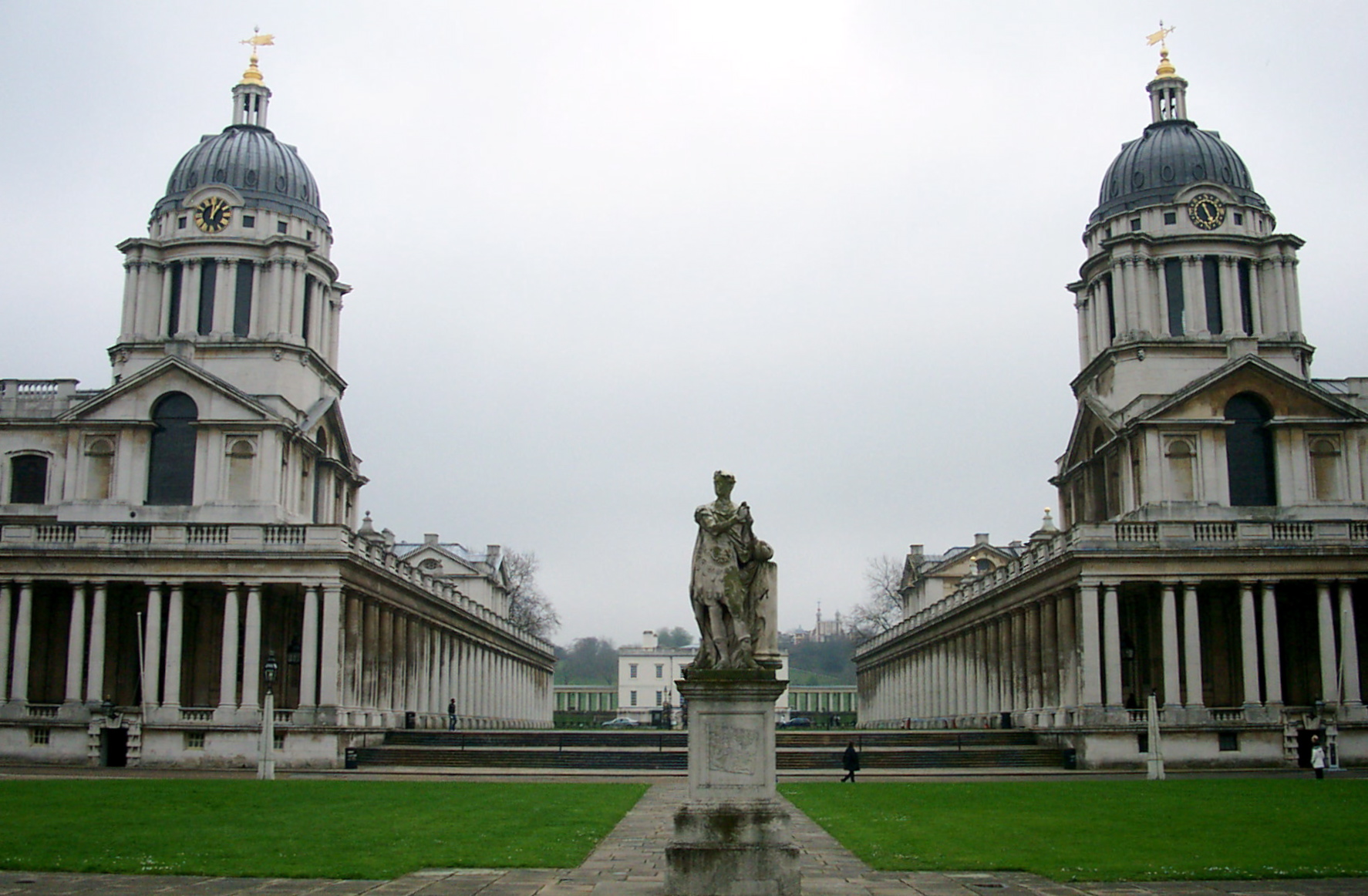
The Royal Naval College, where Percival studied in 1930

In 1930, Percival spent a year studying at the Royal Naval College, Greenwich. From 1931 to 1932, Percival was a General Staff Officer Grade 2, an instructor at the Staff College. The college's commandant was by now Major-General Sir John Dill, who became Percival's mentor over the next decade, helping to ensure his protégé's advancement. Dill regarded Percival as a promising officer and wrote that "he has an outstanding ability, wide military knowledge, good judgment and is a very quick and accurate worker" but added "he has not altogether an impressive presence and one may therefore fail, at first meeting him, to appreciate his sterling worth". With Dill's support, Percival was appointed to command the 2nd Battalion, the Cheshire Regiment from 1932 to 1936, initially in Malta. In 1935, he attended the Imperial Defence College in London.

Percival was made a full colonel in March 1936, and until 1938 he was General Staff Officer Grade 1 in Malaya, the Chief of Staff to General Dobbie, the General Officer Commanding in Malaya. During this time, he recognised that Singapore was no longer an isolated fortress. He considered the possibility of the Japanese landing in Thailand to "burgle Malaya by the backdoor and conducted an appraisal of the possibility of an attack being launched on Singapore from the North, which was supplied to the War Office, and which Percival subsequently felt was similar to the plan followed by the Japanese in 1941. He also supported Dobbie's unexecuted plan for the construction of fixed defences in Southern Johore. In March 1938, Percival returned to Britain and was (temporarily) promoted to brigadier on the General Staff, Aldershot Command.

== Second World War ==
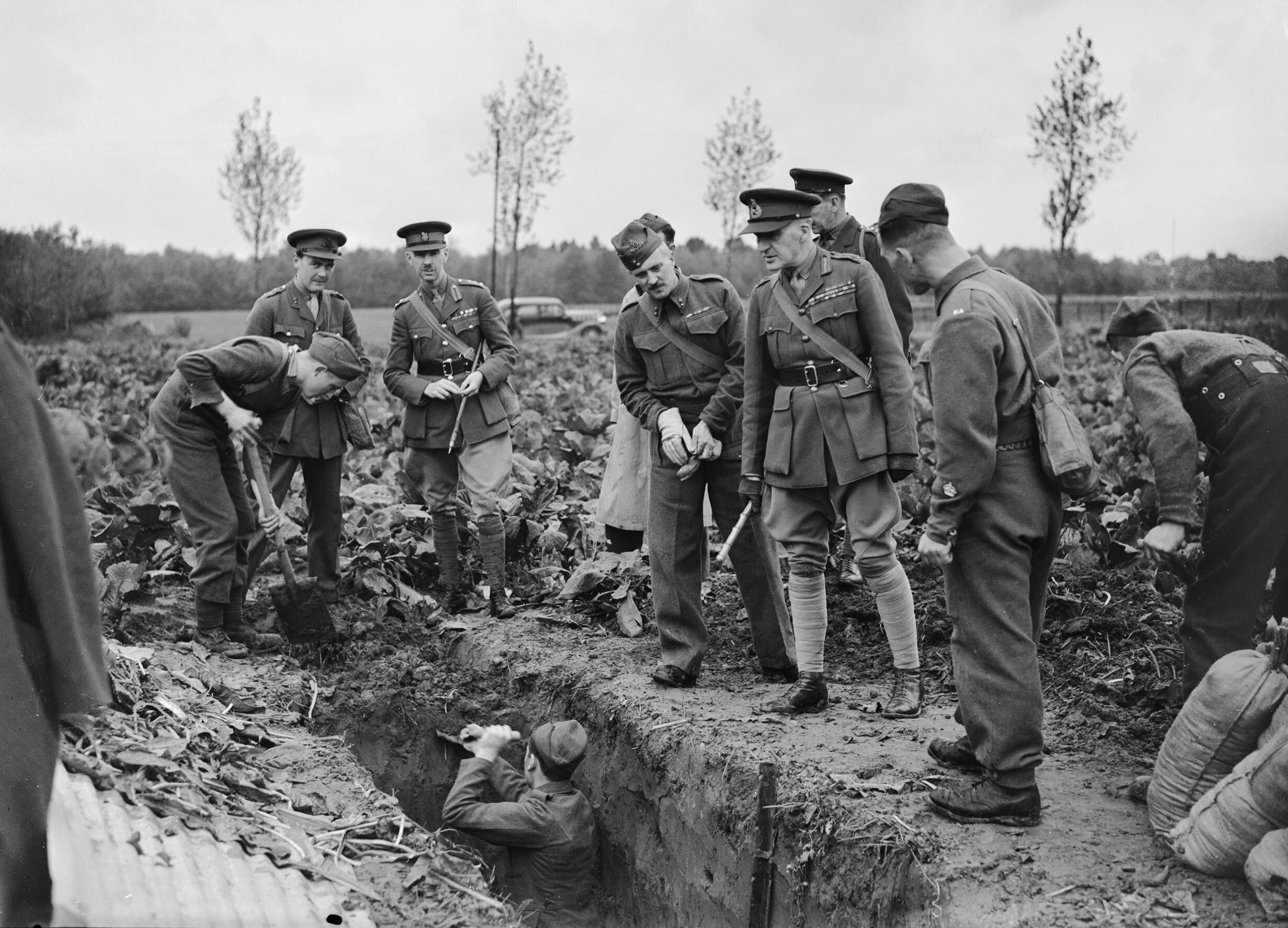
General Sir John Dill, GOC I Corps, inspecting soldiers digging trenches at Flines, France. Stood three away from is his BGS, Brigadier Arthur Percival.

Percival was appointed brigadier, General Staff, of the I Corps, British Expeditionary Force, commanded by General Dill, from 1939 to 1940. He was then promoted to acting major-general, and in February 1940 briefly became General Officer Commanding (GOC) of the 43rd (Wessex) Infantry Division. He was made Assistant Chief of the Imperial General Staff at the War Office in 1940 but asked for a transfer to an active command after the Dunkirk evacuation. Given command of the 44th (Home Counties) Division, he spent 9 months organising the protection of 62 miles (100 km) of the English coast from invasion. He was appointed a Companion of the Order of the Bath (CB) in the 1941 King's Birthday Honours.

=== Percival's early assessment of the vulnerability of Singapore ===
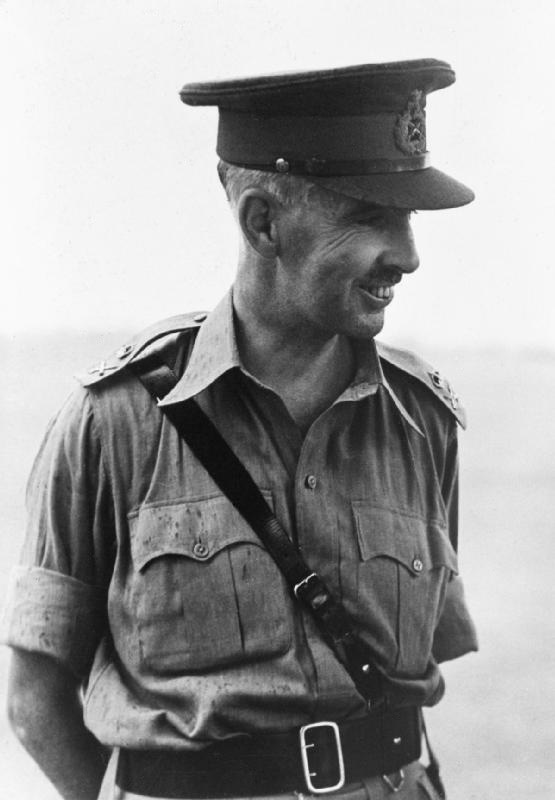
Lieutenant-General Percival, pictured here as GOC Malaya Command, December 1941

In 1936, Major-General William Dobbie, then General Officer Commanding (Malaya), had made an inquiry into whether more forces were required on mainland Malaya to prevent the Japanese from establishing forward bases to attack Singapore. Percival, then his Chief Staff Officer, had been tasked to draw up a tactical assessment of how the Japanese were most likely to attack. In late 1937, his analysis had duly confirmed that north Malaya might become the critical battleground. The Japanese were likely to seize the east coast landing sites on Thailand and Malaya in order to capture aerodromes and achieve air superiority. This could serve as a prelude to further Japanese landings in Johore to disrupt communications northwards and enable the construction of another main base in North Borneo. From there, the final sea and air assault could be launched against eastern Singapore – in particular the Changi area.

=== General Officer Commanding (Malaya) ===
In April 1941 Percival was promoted to acting Lieutenant-General, and was appointed General Officer Commanding (GOC) Malaya. This was a significant promotion for him as he had never commanded an army corps although he had previous experience there. He left Britain in a Sunderland flying boat and embarked on an arduous fortnight-long, multi-stage flight via Gibraltar, Malta, Alexandria (where he was delayed by the Anglo-Iraqi War), Basra, Karachi, and Rangoon, where he was met by an RAF transport.

Percival had mixed feelings about his appointment, noting that:

In going to Malaya I realised that there was the double danger either of being left in an inactive command for some years if war did not break out in the East or, if it did, of finding myself involved in a pretty sticky business with the inadequate forces which are usually to be found in the distant parts of our Empire in the early stages of a war."

For much of the interwar period, Britain's defensive plan for Malaya had centred on the dispatch of a naval fleet to the newly built Singapore Naval Base. Accordingly, the army's role was to defend Singapore and Southern Johore. While this plan had seemed adequate when the nearest Japanese base had been 1,700 miles (2,700 km) away, the outbreak of war in Europe, combined with the partial Japanese occupation of the northern part of French Indochina and the signing of the Tripartite Pact by Germany, Italy, and Japan in September 1940, had underlined the difficulty of a sea-based defence. Instead it was proposed to use the RAF to defend Malaya, at least until reinforcements could be dispatched from Britain. This led to the building of airfields in northern Malaya and along its east coast and the dispersal of the available army units around the peninsula to protect them.

On arrival, Percival set about training his inexperienced army; his Indian troops were particularly raw, with most of their experienced officers having been withdrawn to support the formation of new units as the Indian army expanded. Relying upon commercial aircraft or the Volunteer air force to overcome the shortage of RAF planes, he toured the peninsula and encouraged the building of defensive works around Jitra. A training manual approved by Percival, Tactical Notes on Malaya, was distributed to all units.

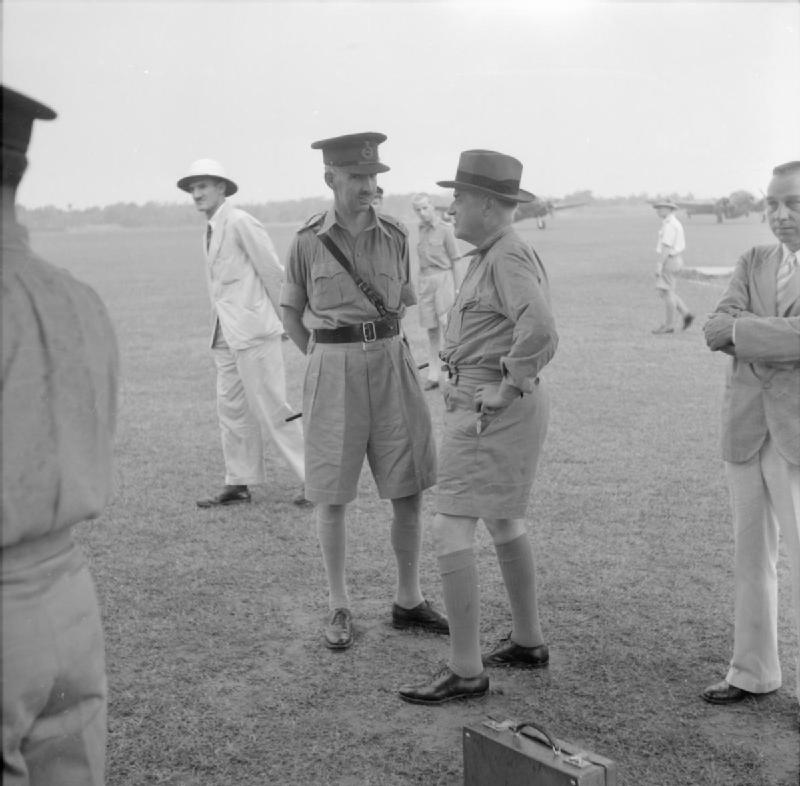
Lieutenant General Percival welcomes U.S. Envoy W. Averell Harriman at Sembawang Airfield, 30 October 1941.

In July 1941 when the Japanese occupied southern Indochina, Britain, the United States and the Netherlands imposed economic sanctions, freezing Japanese financial assets and cutting Japan from its supplies of oil, tin and rubber. This ABCD Encirclement aimed at pressuring Japan to abandon its involvement in China; instead, the Japanese government planned to seize the resources of South-East Asia from the European nations by force. Both the Japanese navy and army were mobilised, but for the moment an uneasy state of cold war persisted. British Commonwealth reinforcements continued to trickle into Malaya. On 2 December, the battleship HMS Prince of Wales and the battle-cruiser HMS Repulse, escorted by four destroyers, arrived in Singapore, the first time a battle fleet had been based there. (They were to have been accompanied by the aircraft carrier HMS Indomitable to provide air cover but she had run aground in the Caribbean en route.) The following day Rear-Admiral Spooner hosted a dinner attended by the newly arrived Commander-in-Chief Eastern Fleet, Admiral Sir Tom Phillips, and Percival.

=== Japanese attack and British surrender ===
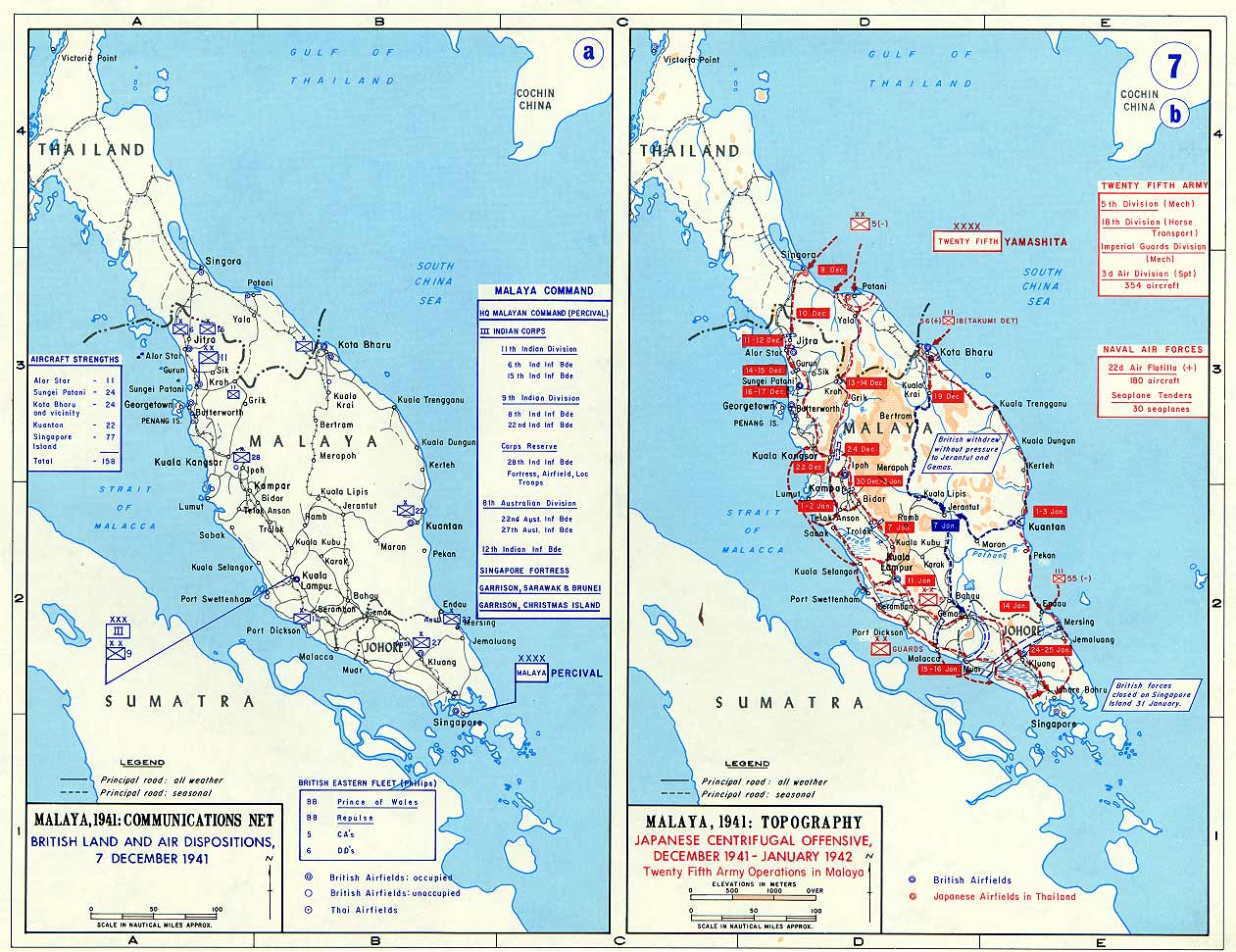
Malaya Command and the Japanese invasion of Malaya

On 8 December 1941 the Japanese 25th Army under the command of Lieutenant-General Tomoyuki Yamashita launched an amphibious assault on the Malay Peninsula (one hour before the attack on Pearl Harbor; the difference in date was because the two places lie on opposite sides of the International Date Line). That night the first Japanese invasion force arrived at Kota Bharu on Malaya's east coast. This was just a diversionary force, and the main landings took place the next day at Singora and Pattani on the south-eastern coast of Thailand, with troops rapidly deploying over the border into northern Malaya.

On 10 December Percival issued a stirring, if ultimately ineffective, Special Order of the Day:

In this hour of trial the General Officer Commanding calls upon all ranks Malaya Command for a determined and sustained effort to safeguard Malaya and the adjoining British territories. The eyes of the Empire are upon us. Our whole position in the Far East is at stake. The struggle may be long and grim but let us all resolve to stand fast come what may and to prove ourselves worthy of the great trust which has been placed in us.

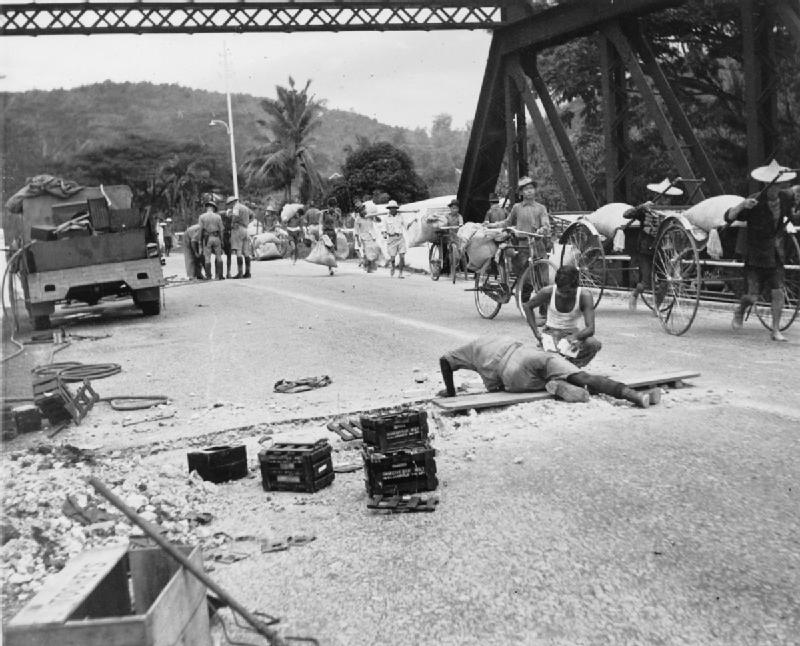
Royal Engineers prepare to blow up a bridge during the retreat.

The Japanese advanced rapidly, and on 27 January 1942 Percival ordered a general retreat across the Johore Strait to the island of Singapore and organised a defence along the length of the island's 70-mile (110 km) coast line. But the Japanese did not dawdle, and on 8 February Japanese troops landed on the northwest corner of Singapore island. After a week of fighting on the island, Percival held his final command conference at 9 am on 15 February in the Battle Box of Fort Canning. The Japanese had already occupied approximately half of Singapore and it was clear that the island would soon fall. Having been told that ammunition and water would both run out by the following day, Percival agreed to surrender. The Japanese at this point were running low on artillery shells, but Percival did not know this.

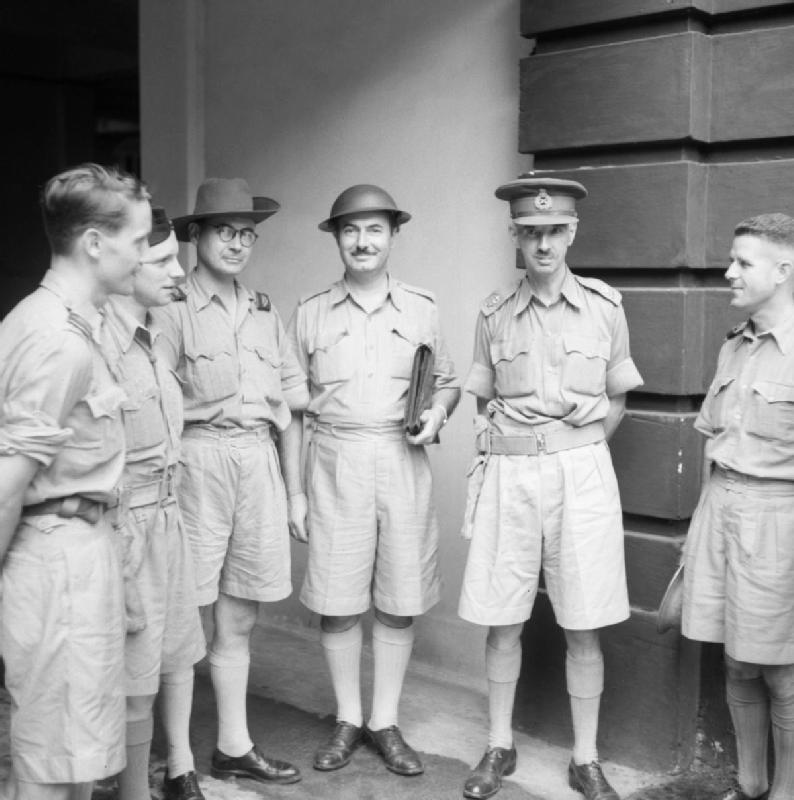
Lieutenant General Percival, GOC Malaya (second from right), with war correspondents in Singapore, shortly before the captitulation, late January 1942.

The Japanese insisted that Percival himself march under a white flag to the Old Ford Motor Factory in Bukit Timah to negotiate the surrender. A Japanese officer present noted that he looked "pale, thin and tired". After a brief disagreement, when Percival insisted that the British keep 1,000 men under arms in Singapore to preserve order, which Yamashita finally conceded, it was agreed at 6:10 pm that all British Commonwealth troops would lay down their arms and cease resistance at 8:30 pm. This was in spite of instructions from Prime Minister Winston Churchill for prolonged resistance.

A common view holds that 129,704 Allied personnel surrendered or were killed by fewer than 30,000 Japanese. However, the former figure includes nearly 50,000 troops captured or killed during the Battle of Malaya, and perhaps 15,000 base troops. Many of the other troops were tired and under-equipped following their retreat from the Malayan peninsula. Conversely, the latter number represents only the front-line troops available for the invasion of Singapore. British Commonwealth casualties in battle since 8 December amounted to 7,500 killed and 11,000 wounded. Japanese losses totalled more than 3,507 killed and 6,107 wounded.

=== Culpability for the fall of Singapore ===
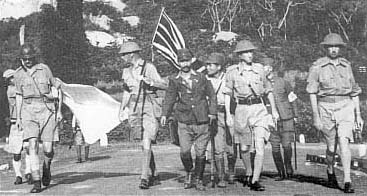
Lieutenant-General Percival led by Kazushi Sugita, marches under a flag of truce to negotiate the capitulation of Allied forces in Singapore, on 15 February 1942. It was the largest surrender of British-led forces in history.

Churchill viewed the fall of Singapore to be "the worst disaster and largest capitulation in British history." However, the British defence was that the Middle East and the Soviet Union had all received higher priorities in the allocation of men and material, so the desired air force strength of 300 to 500 aircraft was never reached, and whereas the Japanese invaded with over two hundred tanks, the British Army in Malaya did not have a single tank. In The War in Malaya Percival himself cites this as the major factor for the defeat stating that the 'war material which might have saved Singapore was sent to Russia and the Middle East'. However he also concedes that Britain was engaged in 'a life and death struggle in the West' and that 'this decision, however painful and regrettable, was inevitable and right'.

In 1918, Percival had been described as "a slim, soft spoken man... with a proven reputation for bravery and organisational powers" but by 1945 this description had been turned on its head with even Percival's defenders describing him as "something of a damp squib". The fall of Singapore switched Percival's reputation to that of an ineffective "staff wallah", lacking ruthlessness and aggression. Over six feet in height and lanky, with a clipped moustache and two protruding teeth, and unphotogenic, Percival was an easy target for a caricaturist, being described as "tall, bucktoothed and lightly built". There was no doubt his presentation lacked impact as "his manner was low key and he was a poor public speaker with the cusp of a lisp".

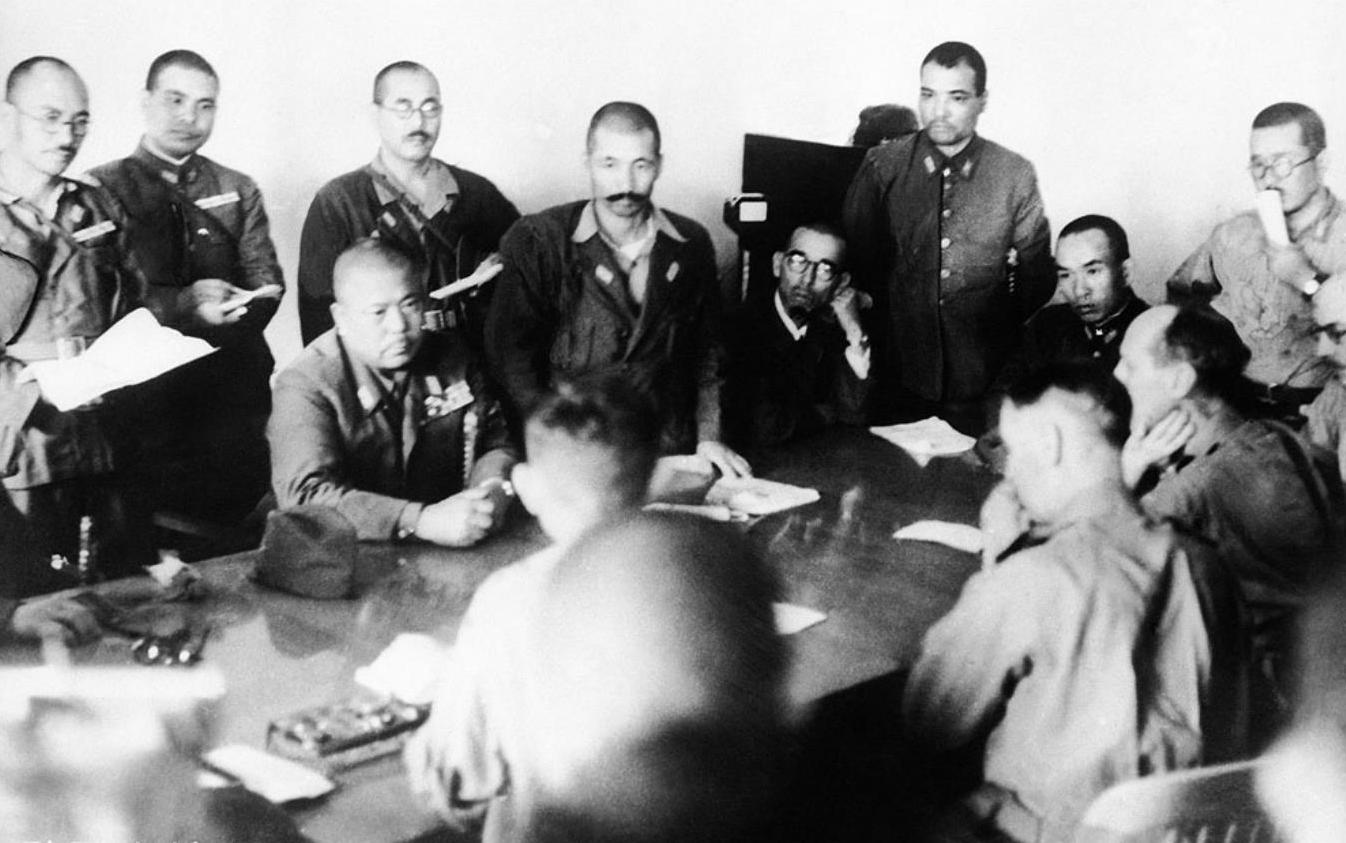
Lieutenant-General Yamashita (seated, centre) and Lieutenant-General Percival sitting between his officers, his clenched hand to his mouth. (Note: The story that in the negotiation Yamashita thumped the table with his fists to intimidate for the Malaya Command to surrender is widely circulated but by 1991 at the latest it turned out to be a fiction. After declaration of death by hanging at the military tribunals in Philippines in 1945 Yamashita was interviewed by a Japanese journalist and mentioned the story in it. He denied clearly the story that he coerced and/or intimidated Percival and asked the journalist to correct the fiction to the truth. Besides we have another testimony by Kazushi Sugita, who was a staff officer of intelligence in the Japanese 25th Army at the time of Malayan campaign. Sugita, the standing figure with moustache next to Yamashita in the photograph, served as a translator in the negotiation. Masayasu Hosaka, the well-known Japanese writer specializing to the history in wartime Japan of Shōwa period, interviewed him in 1991. In the interview Sugita also denied the story. According to him Yamashita asked Percival a question if Malaya command surrendered unconditionally, on the other hand, Percival repeatedly wanted for stationing 1,500 British soldiers to prevent from pillaging without answering it. Because Percival did not reply to his question Yamashita finally asked Percival to answer it in Yes or No to make the discussion clear.)

Air Chief Marshal Sir Robert Brooke-Popham, the Commander-in-Chief of the British Far East Command, refused Percival permission to launch Operation Matador, a pre-emptive invasion of Thailand, in advance of the Japanese landings there; he did not wish to run any risk of provoking the coming war. Brooke-Popham was accused by his detractors of not arguing forcefully for air reinforcements required to defend Malaya.

Peter Wykeham suggested that the government in London was more to blame than any of the British commanders in the Far East. Despite repeated requests, the British government did not provide the necessary reinforcements and they denied Brooke-Popham – and therefore Percival – permission to enter neutral Thailand before it was too late to put in place forward defences.

Moreover, Percival had difficulties with his subordinates Sir Lewis "Piggy" Heath, commanding Indian III Corps, and the independent-minded Gordon Bennett, commanding the Australian 8th Division. The former officer had been senior to Percival prior to his appointment as GOC (Malaya).

Percival was ultimately responsible for the men who served under him, and with other officers – notably Major-General David Murray-Lyon, commander of the Indian 11th Infantry Division – he had shown a willingness to replace them when he felt their performance was not up to scratch. Perhaps his greatest mistake was to resist the building of fixed defences in either Johore or the north shore of Singapore, dismissing them in the face of repeated requests to start construction from his Chief Engineer, Brigadier Ivan Simson, with the comment "Defences are bad for morale – for both troops and civilians".

Percival also insisted on defending the north-eastern shore of Singapore most heavily, against the advice of the Allied supreme commander in South East Asia, General Sir Archibald Wavell. Percival was perhaps fixed on his responsibilities for defending the Singapore Naval Base. He also spread his forces thinly around the island and kept few units as a strategic reserve. When the Japanese attack came in the west, the Australian 22nd Brigade took the brunt of the assault. Percival refused to reinforce them as he continued to believe that the main assault would occur in the north east. The attacking Japanese were down to the last of their ammunition when Percival surrendered. Before surrendering, besides taking his own counsel, he consulted his own officers.

In the post-war Percival Report (written in 1946, published in 1948) the "imminent collapse" of the water supply, estimated by David J. Murnane, the Municipal Water Engineer, on 14 February to occur within 24–48 hours, was highlighted as a direct cause for surrender. According to oral history records, quoted by Louis Allen (author of Singapore 1941–42), Murnane asked for and was promised by General Percival "ten lorries and a hundred Royal Engineers" so he could fix the water supply leaks caused by Japanese bombing and shelling. He never got what he needed: Louis Allen says Murnane got 'one lorry and ten frightened Sikhs'. When confronted again, all that Percival delivered (on 14 February) was one lorry and ten Royal Engineers but it was too late.

=== Captivity ===
Percival himself was briefly held prisoner in Changi Prison, where "the defeated GOC could be seen sitting head in hands, outside the married quarters he now shared with seven brigadiers, a colonel, his ADC and cook-sergeant. He discussed feelings with few, spent hours walking around the extensive compound, ruminating on the reverse and what might have been". In the belief that it would improve discipline, he reconstituted a Malaya Command, complete with staff appointments, and helped occupy his fellow prisoners with lectures on the Battle of France.

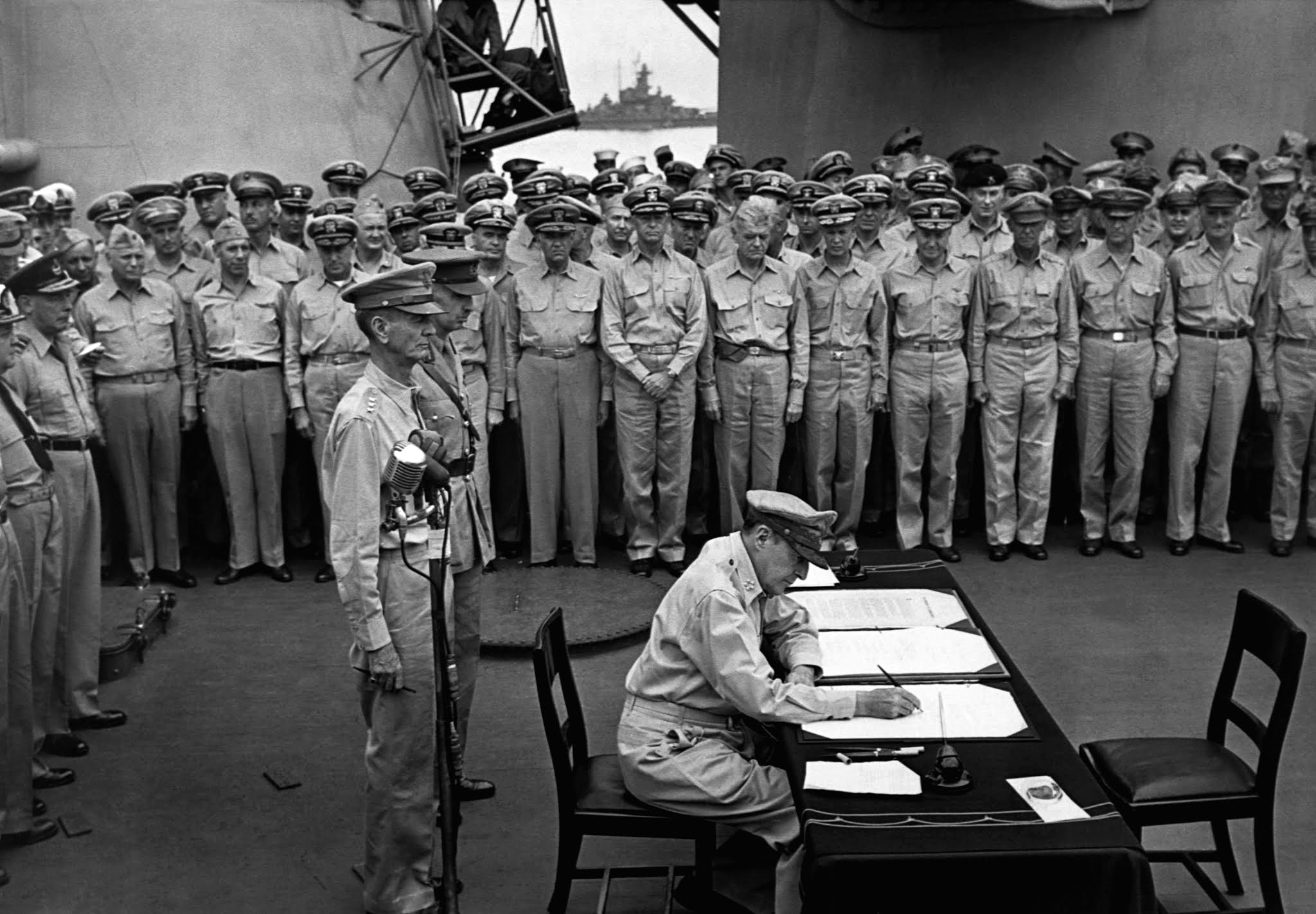
The signing of the Japanese surrender; MacArthur (sitting), behind him are Generals Percival (background) and Wainwright (foreground)

Along with the other senior British captives above the rank of colonel, Percival was removed from Singapore in August 1942. First he was imprisoned in Formosa and then sent on to Manchuria, where he was held with several dozen other VIP captives, including the American General Jonathan Wainwright, in a prisoner-of-war camp near Hsian, about 100 miles (160 km) to the north east of Mukden.

As the war drew to an end, an OSS team removed the prisoners from Hsian. Percival was then taken, along with Wainwright, to stand immediately behind General Douglas MacArthur as he confirmed the terms of the Japanese surrender aboard USS Missouri in Tokyo Bay on 2 September 1945. Afterwards, MacArthur gave Percival a pen he had used to sign the treaty.

Percival and Wainwright then returned together to the Philippines to witness the surrender of the Japanese army there, which in a twist of fate was commanded by General Yamashita. Yamashita was momentarily surprised to see his former captive at the ceremony; on this occasion Percival refused to shake Yamashita's hand, angered by the mistreatment of POWs in Singapore. The flag carried by Percival's party on the way to Bukit Timah was also a witness to this reversal of fortunes, being flown when the Japanese formally surrendered Singapore back to Lord Louis Mountbatten.

== Later life ==
Percival returned to the United Kingdom in September 1945 to write his despatch at the War Office but this was revised by the UK Government and published only in 1948. He retired from the army in 1946 with the honorary rank of lieutenant-general but the pension of his substantive rank of major-general. Thereafter, he held appointments connected with the county of Hertfordshire, where he lived at Bullards in Widford: he was Honorary Colonel of 479th (Hertfordshire Yeomanry) Heavy Anti-Aircraft Regiment, Royal Artillery, (T.A.) from 1949 to 1954 and in 1951 was appointed as one of the Deputy Lieutenants of Hertfordshire. He continued his relationship with the Cheshire Regiment being appointed Colonel of the Cheshire Regiment between 1950 and 1955; an association continued by his son, Brigadier James Percival who became Colonel of the Regiment between 1992 and 1999.

Percival was respected for the time he had spent as a Japanese prisoner of war. Serving as life president of the Far East Prisoners of War Association (FEPOW), he pushed for compensation for his fellow captives, eventually helping to obtain a token £5 million of frozen Japanese assets for this cause. This was distributed by the FEPOW Welfare Trust, on which Percival served as chairman. He led protests against the film The Bridge on the River Kwai when it was released in 1957, obtaining the addition of an on-screen statement that the movie was a work of fiction. He also worked as president of the Hertfordshire British Red Cross and was made an Officer of the Venerable Order of Saint John in 1964.

Percival died at the age of 78 on 31 January 1966, in King Edward VII's Hospital for Officers, Beaumont Street in Westminster, and is buried in the churchyard at Widford in Hertfordshire.

=== Family ===
On 27 July 1927 Percival married Margaret Elizabeth "Betty" MacGregor Greer in Holy Trinity Church, Brompton. She was the daughter of Thomas MacGregor Greer of Tallylagan Manor, a Protestant linen merchant from County Tyrone in Northern Ireland. They had met during his tour of duty in Ireland but it had taken Percival several years to propose. They had two children. A daughter, Dorinda Margery, was born in Greenwich and in 1959 married Charles Mulholland, 4th Baron Dunleath. Alfred James MacGregor, their son, was born in Singapore and served in the British Army.

== Honours ==
- Military Cross (MC) (1916)
- Croix de Guerre (1918)
- Distinguished Service Order (DSO) (1918)
- Distinguished Service Order (DSO*) (1920)
- (OBE (Mil)) (1921)
- Companion of the Order of the Bath (CB (Mil)) (1941)
- Deputy Lieutenant (DL) (1951)
- Officer of the Order of Saint John (OStJ) (1964)

== See also ==
- Operation Krohcol
- Sir Shenton Thomas

== Bibliography ==
- Barry, Tom, Guerilla Days in Ireland, Dublin, 1949
- Bose, Romen, "Secrets of the Battlebox: The role and history of Britain's Command HQ during the Malayan Campaign", Marshall Cavendish, Singapore, 2005 ISBN 978-9814328548
- Coogan, Tim Pat. "Michael Collins". ISBN 0-09-968580-9
- Cox, Jeffrey (2014). Rising Sun, Falling Skies: The disastrous Java Sea Campaign of World War II. Osprey. ISBN 978-1780967264.
- Dixon, Norman F, On the Psychology of Military Incompetence, London, 1976 ISBN 978-0712658898
- Hack, Karl and Blackburn, Kevin, Did Singapore Have to Fall?: Churchill and the Impregnable Fortress, Routledge Curzon, 2003, ISBN 0-415-30803-8
- Keegan, John (editor), Churchill's Generals, Abacus History, 1999, ISBN 0-349-11317-3
- Kinvig, Clifford, General Percival and the Fall of Singapore, in 60 Years On: the Fall of Singapore Revisited, Eastern University Press, Singapore, 2003 ISBN 978-9812102027
- Kingvig, Major-General Clifford (1996). Scapegoat: General Percival of Singapore. Brassey's. ISBN 978-1857531718.
- London Gazette
- MacArthur, Brian, Surviving the Sword: Prisoners of the Japanese 1942–45, Abacus, ISBN 0-349-11937-6
- Oxford Dictionary of National Biography, Volume 43, available at Oxford Dictionary of National Biography website
- Mead, Richard (2007). Churchill's Lions: A Biographical Guide to the Key British Generals of World War II. Stroud: Spellmount. ISBN 978-1-86227-431-0.
- Morris, James Farewell the Trumpets, Penguin Books, 1979 ISBN 978-0151304042
- Percival, Arthur Ernest The War in Malaya, London, Eyre & Spottiswoode, 1949. Extracts from the report used as the basis of this book are at accessed 2 February 2006 and the references here are to this report
- Ryan, Meda. Tom Barry: IRA Freedom Fighter, Cork, 2003 ISBN 978-1856354806
- Smith, Colin, Singapore Burning: Heroism and Surrender in World War II, Penguin Books, ISBN 0-14-101036-3
- Smyth, John George, Percival and the Tragedy of Singapore, MacDonald and Company, 1971. ASIN B0006CDC1Q
- Taylor, A. J. P. English History 1914–1945, Oxford University Press, 1975 ISBN 978-0198217152
- Thompson, Peter (2005). The battle for Singapore : the true story of Britain's greatest military disaster. Portrait. ISBN 0-7499-5068-4. OCLC 61701639.
- Warren, Alan, Singapore 1942: Britain's Greatest Defeat, Hambledon Continuum, 2001, ISBN 1-85285-328-X

Military offices
Preceded by Arthur Floyer-Acland	GOC 43rd (Wessex) Infantry Division; February–April 1940	Succeeded by Robert Pollok
Preceded by Laurence Carr	Assistant Chief of the Imperial General Staff; April–July 1940	Succeeded by Desmond Anderson
Preceded by Edmund Osborne	GOC 44th (Home Counties) Infantry Division; 1940–1941	Succeeded by Noel Mason-MacFarlane
Preceded by Sir Lionel Bond	GOC Malaya Command; 1941–1942	Fell to Japan
Honorary titles
Preceded by Geoffrey Harding	Colonel of the Cheshire Regiment; 1950–1955	Succeeded by Thomas Brodie
