= Widford =

Widford may refer to the following places in England:

- Widford, Essex
- Widford, Hertfordshire
  - Widford railway station, a closed station
- Widford, Oxfordshire (prior to 1844 a detached part of Gloucestershire)
