= Westmill =

Village in Hertfordshire, England

Coordinates: 51.925°N 0.010°W

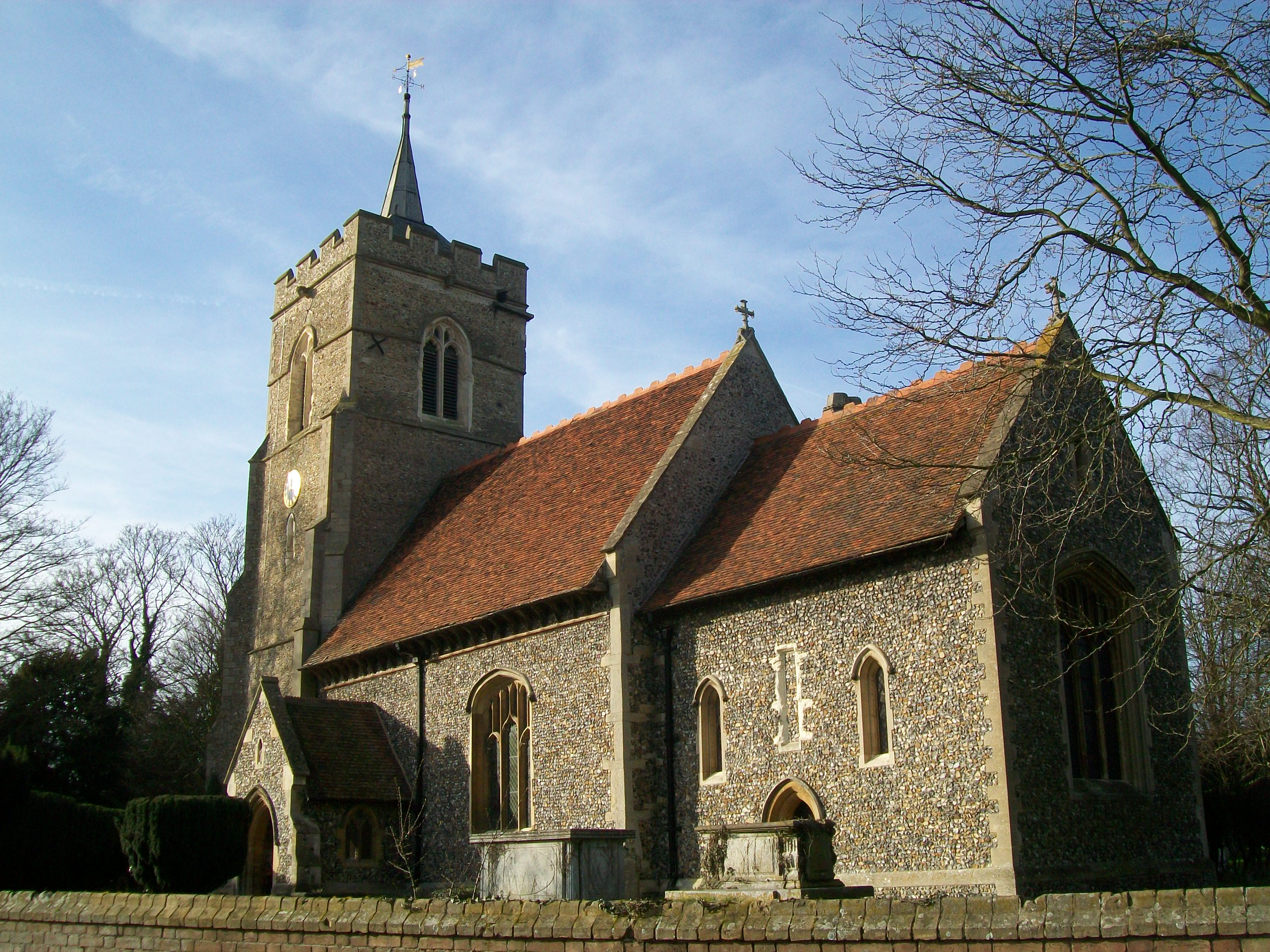
- St Mary the Virgin, Westmill

- Location within Hertfordshire
- Population: 290 (Parish, 2021)
- OS grid reference: TL368270
- District: East Hertfordshire
- Shire county: Hertfordshire
- Region: East
- Country: England
- Sovereign state: United Kingdom
- Post town: BUNTINGFORD
- Postcode district: SG9
- Dialling code: 01763
- Police: Hertfordshire
- Fire: Hertfordshire
- Ambulance: East of England
- UK Parliament: North East Hertfordshire

Westmill is a village and civil parish in the East Hertfordshire district of Hertfordshire, England. It lies in the valley of the River Rib, 1.5 miles (2.4 km) south of Buntingford, its post town. At the 2021 census, the parish had a population of 290.

== Geography ==
The Prime Meridian passes to the east of Westmill, as does the Roman road Ermine Street, which ran from London to Lincoln and York. Its route is followed here by the A10 trunk road. There is an infrequent bus service to Buntingford.

West Mill railway station on the Great Eastern Railway's Buntingford Branch Line from St Margarets to Buntingford opened on 3 July 1863. Passenger traffic thrived until the mid-1950s and the rise of car ownership. The line and station closed to passengers on 16 November 1964. The station buildings had been demolished by 1968.

== Historic buildings ==
The large medieval parish church, dedicated to St Mary the Virgin and restored in the 19th century, shows signs of a Saxon origin. It is one of a large number of historic buildings in the village. One, a thatched cottage named Button Snap at Cherry Green, was owned by the writer Charles Lamb from 1812 to 1815. It was through the widow of his godfather, Francis Fielde (died 1809) that Lamb, as he put it, "came into possession of the only landed property which I could ever call my own."

The church is part of a joint benefice of Aspenden and Buntingford. The commons were enclosed in 1819.

The former 16th-century watermill is now a private house.

== Facilities ==
The village has a pub/restaurant, the Sword Inn Hand, which dates from the 14th century, and a village hall, where a children's nursery is held.

== Notable residents ==
- The antiquary Nathanael Salmon (1675–1742) was a curate in the village for several years, but refused to take the oath of allegiance to Queen Anne in 1702 and later practised as a doctor in St Ives. His History of Hertfordshire appeared in 1728.
- Westmill was the 1833 birthplace of the child diarist Emily Pepys, whose father Henry Pepys, later bishop of Sodor and Man, then bishop of Worcester, was the rector from 1827 to 1840. He donated a stained-glass window in memory of four of his children, who died in childhood. This can be seen behind the altar.
- The murder of a small girl by her nine-year-old brother, Billy Game, at Westmill in 1848 became the subject of a ballad.

== See also ==
The Hundred Parishes
