= River ash =

River ash may refer to:-

- The river ash tree (Fraxinus pennsylvanica).

River Ash may refer to:-

- River Ash, Hertfordshire
- River Ash, Surrey
