= Cherry Green, Hertfordshire =

Hamlet in Hertfordshire, England

Coordinates: 51.9167°N 0.0345°W

Cherry Green
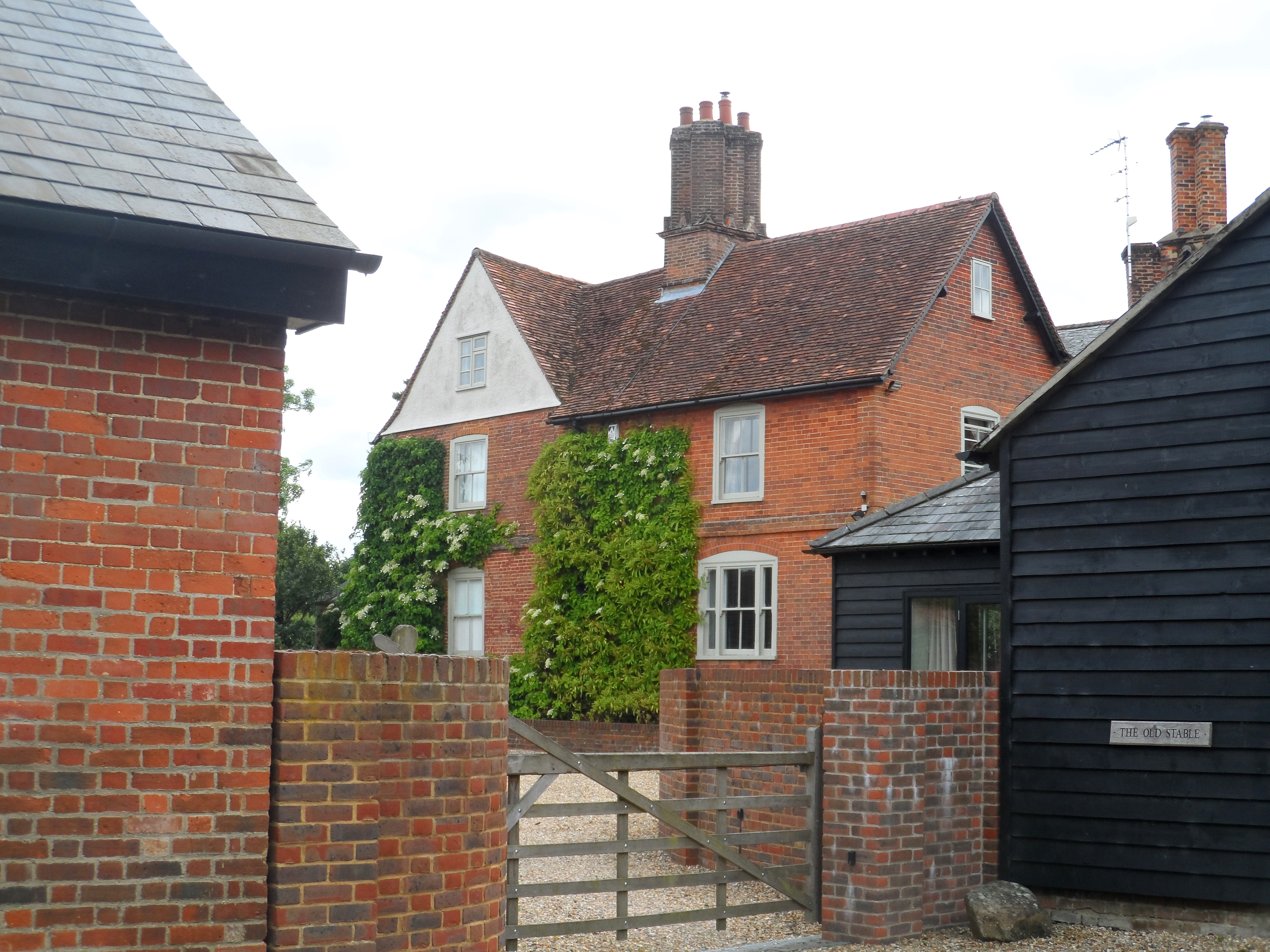
- Cherry Green Farmhouse

- Location within Hertfordshire
- Civil parish: Westmill
- District: East Hertfordshire
- Shire county: Hertfordshire
- Region: East
- Country: England
- Sovereign state: United Kingdom
- Police: Hertfordshire
- Fire: Hertfordshire
- Ambulance: East of England

Cherry Green is a small hamlet in the East Hertfordshire district, in the county of Hertfordshire, England. The post town for Cherry Green is the nearby town of Buntingford. It is in the civil parish of Westmill, and is one mile southwest of the now disused West Mill railway station.
