= Cherry Green =

Cherry Green may refer to:

- Cherry Green, Essex, a hamlet in England
- Cherry Green, Hertfordshire, a hamlet in England
- Cherry Smith (1943–2008), Jamaican vocalist
