= Ivan Simson =

Brigadier Ivan Simson OBE
- Born: 14 August 1890
- Died: 4 February 1971 (aged 80)
- Military career
- Allegiance: United Kingdom
- Branch: British Army
- Rank: Brigadier
- Conflicts: First World War; Second World War: Battle of Malaya; Battle of Singapore
- Awards: Officer of the Order of the British Empire

Brigadier Ivan Simson, OBE (14 August 1890 – 4 February 1971) was a British Army officer and the chief engineer in Malaya from August 1941 until its surrender to the Japanese in 1942. Simson was tasked with improving the defenses in Singapore in the face of possible attack by the Japanese, although Simson's defensive recommendations were largely rejected by his commander, Lieutenant General Arthur Percival, as being bad for morale. Previously he was Deputy Chief Engineer Scottish Command.

The Battle of Singapore from 8 to 15 February resulted in a decisive Japanese victory and the capture of Percival, Simson, and the majority of troops under them.

== Sources ==
- Murfett, Malcolm H., John Miksic, Brian Farell, and Chiang Ming Shun. Between 2 Oceans (2nd Edn): A Military History of Singapore from 1275 to 1971. Marshall Cavendish International Asia Pte Ltd, 2011.
- Generals of World War II
