= Widford, Hertfordshire =

Village in Hertfordshire, England

Coordinates: 51.822°N 0.060°E

Widford
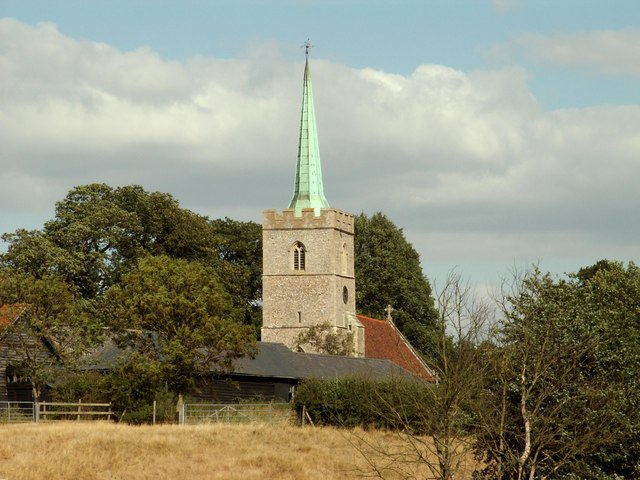
- St John the Baptist Church

- Location within Hertfordshire
- Population: 659 (Parish, 2021)
- OS grid reference: TL 421 157
- Civil parish: Widford
- District: East Hertfordshire
- Shire county: Hertfordshire
- Region: East
- Country: England
- Sovereign state: United Kingdom
- Post town: WARE
- Postcode district: SG12
- Dialling code: 01279
- UK Parliament: Hertford and Stortford

Widford is a village and civil parish in the East Hertfordshire district of Hertfordshire, England. It lies 4 miles (6 km) east of Ware, its post town. The River Ash flows through the north of the parish. At the 2021 census, the parish had a population of 659.

== History ==
The name Widford comes from the old English word 'wid' meaning willow tree and the word 'ford'

Widford historically had extensive commons, which were enclosed under an award of 1856. There was a wood called Lily Wood to the west of the village which was cut down in the late 19th century.

Between 1870 and 1872, John Marius Wilson described Widford as: "a parish, with a village, in Ware district, Herts; near the Buntingford railway, 4 miles E by N of Ware. It has a post-office under Ware, and a r. station." In 1912 the parish was reported to cover an area of 1,167 acres (472 hectares).

== Demography and employment ==
At the 2021 census, the population of the parish was 659.

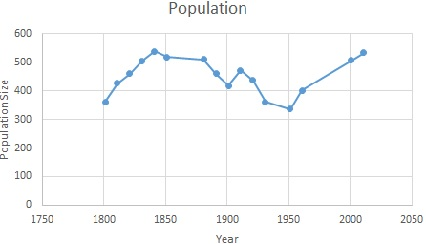
Population Graph of Widford between 1801 and 2011.

In the first national census of 1801, the population of Widford was recorded at 361. In the 19th and 20th centuries, the population peaked in 1841 at 539, a number it would not exceed again until the 2021 census.

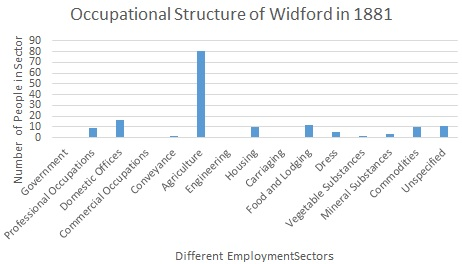
Image shows the different occupations people were employed by in 1881 and the numbers of people in each sector.

The data included in the graph shows that in 1881 there was one sector of employment that was significantly more popular than any others. This sector was the agriculture sector which had a total of 81 people working in.

== Buildings and landmarks ==
Widford School is a combination of a primary school and a pre-school. There are approximately 60 pupils with a capacity for a maximum of 8 children per year group. Widford School has been open since 1875.

The Village Hall, on Bell Lane at the south of the civil parish, provides for local individuals and organisations. It was built in 1910 by George S Pawle. The primary use of the hall at inception was as a drill hall for the Hertfordshire Regiment TA; it was then used by a Regiment from Staffordshire. It was for village activities and events before it was bought in 1956, after volunteers raised money to buy the building and renovate it. These volunteers then cared and maintained the hall. A new kitchen was added in 2009. The hall has two main rooms: a function room and a smaller room. The function room has a removable stage and has capacity for 100 people. The smaller room is more of a committee room with capacity for 30 people.

Widford railway station opened in 1863 on the Buntingford branch line. The line closed in 1964. The site of the station became a coal and garden product distribution centre, whilst the route of the dismantled railway is used by walkers and cyclists.

Widford allotments hold more than 20 plots; these were created in 1978 after the land was purchased by Widford Parish Council.

=== Church ===
The parish church is St John the Baptist. The oldest parts of the church date to the early 13th century, with further work in the late 13th and 14th. The church registers, at Hertfordshire County Record Office, date from 1558. The church graveyard was closed for burials in 1903 when a new graveyard on the other side of Ware Road became available. The Church is supported by an independent, non-religious charity called The Friends of Widford Church. The purpose of the charity is to support the parochial church council and to care for the management and maintenance of the church.

== Sport and recreation ==
=== Playing field ===
Widford Playing Field includes a children's play area, a football pitch and a cricket strip. The playing field has green areas of planted trees and hedges. The development of the playing field came after Askey's Field was bought in 1979 by volunteers from the Village Hall Community who raised the money for purchase.

=== Cricket Club ===
The ground of Ware Cricket Club is one of the few privately owned cricket grounds in the country. The club has two teams that compete in the Saracens Hertfordshire Premier Cricket League.

== Notable people ==
- John Eliot was born in Widford. He was a Puritan missionary to the American Indians He developed an interest in Indian language and translated the Bible into Algonkian which is an American Indian, Algonquian language.
- Octavia Lewin was born here and she became one of Britain's first woman physician's and a leading homeopath and suffragist.
- Arthur Percival who lived in Widford following the end of the Second World War, he was a British Army officer who is best known for his involvement in the Second World War. He commanded the forces of the British Commonwealth during the Battle of Malaya and the subsequent Battle of Singapore.
- Charles Lamb, the author, with his sister of Lamb's Tales from Shakespeare, was a regular visitor to the village when he stayed with his Grandmother Mary Field; her grave can be found in the old churchyard. Mary Field was the housekeeper at the original Blakesware Manor.

== See also ==
- The Hundred Parishes
