= Hadham railway station =

Disused railway station in Much Hadham, Hertfordshire

Hadham
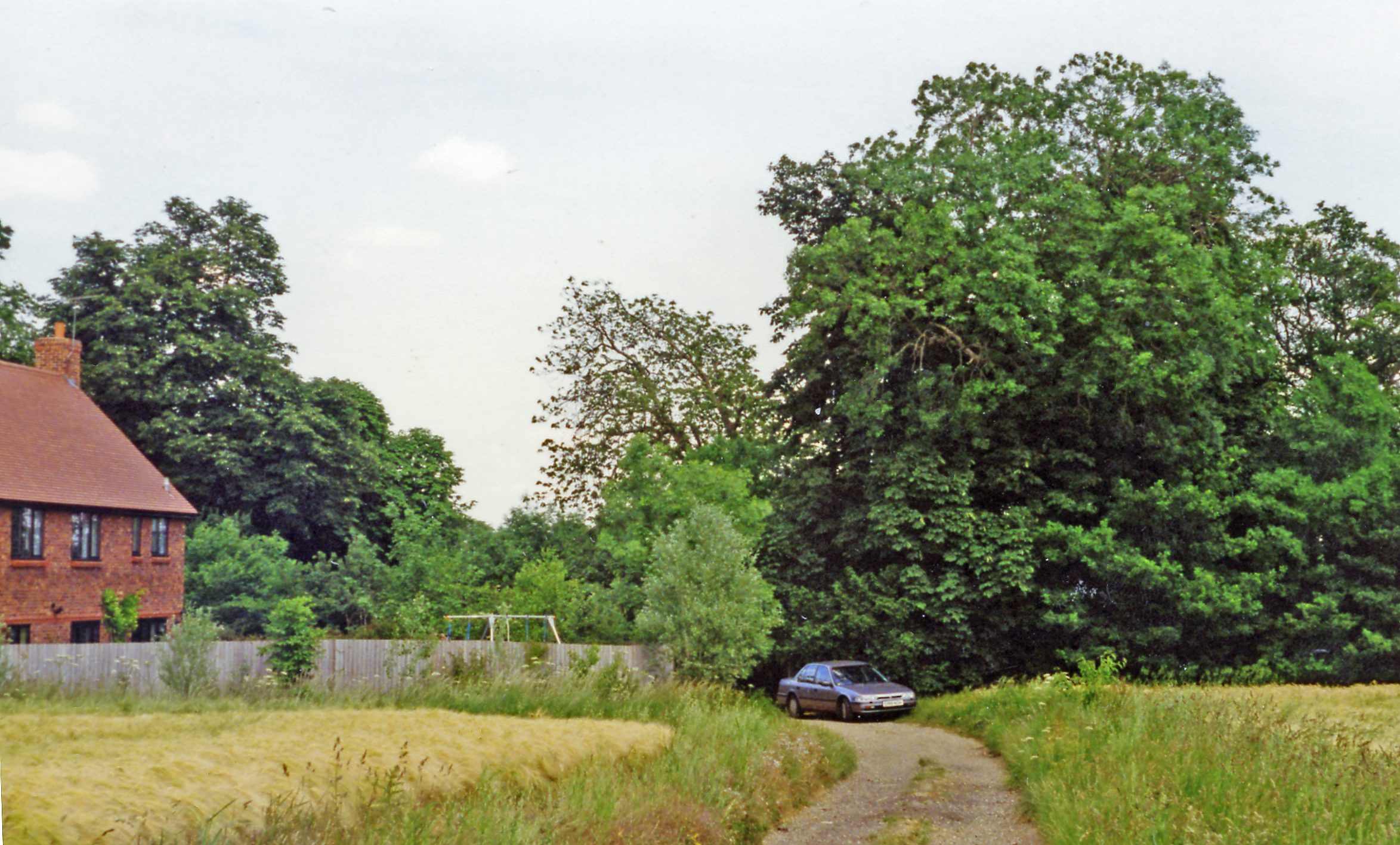
- The site of the station in 1995

General information
- Location: Much Hadham, Hertfordshire; England
- Coordinates: 51.8434°N 0.0643°E
- Grid reference: TL423181
- Platforms: 2

Other information
- Status: Disused

History
- Original company: Great Eastern Railway
- Post-grouping: London and North Eastern Railway

Key dates
- 3 July 1863: Opened
- 16 November 1964: Closed to passengers
- 20 September 1965: Closed to goods
Location

Hadham railway station served the village of Much Hadham, Hertfordshire, England, from 1863 to 1965 on the Buntingford branch line.

== History ==
The station was opened on 3 July 1863 by the Great Eastern Railway. It was situated at the end of Station Road. On the up platform were the station buildings which incorporated a toilet and a waiting room. To the north of this platform was a signal box which controlled a loop and the goods yard. The station closed to passengers on 16 November 1964 and closed to goods on 20 September 1965. The station buildings and the station house were wrecked by vandals a few years after closure. They were eventually demolished after the parish council requested it.

Preceding station	Disused railways	Following station
Standon; Line and station closed	Great Eastern Railway; Buntingford branch line	Widford; Line and station closed
