= Kazushi Sugita =

IJA and JGSDF officer (1904–1993)

- 杉田 一次
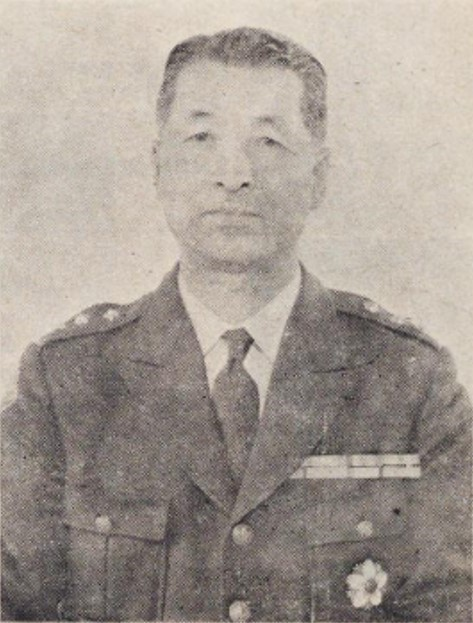
- Sugita, c. 1961
- Born: 31 March 1904; Nara, Japan
- Died: 12 April 1993 (aged 89); Tokyo, Japan
- Military career
- Allegiance: Empire of Japan; Japan
- Branch: Imperial Japanese Army; Japan Ground Self-Defense Force
- Rank: Colonel (IJA); General (JGSDF)
- Units: 25th Army, Imperial General Headquarters, 2nd Division, 8th Area Army
- Conflicts: World War II; Malayan campaign; Guadalcanal campaign; Battle of the Bismarck Sea
- Other work: Military attaché, executive secretary, delegate

Kazushi Sugita (杉田 一次, Sugita Kazushi; 31 March 1904 – 12 April 1993) was a colonel in the Imperial Japanese Army during World War II, and later a general in the post-war Japan Ground Self Defense Force. He was a principal participant in the surrender of Singapore in February 1942.

== Military career ==
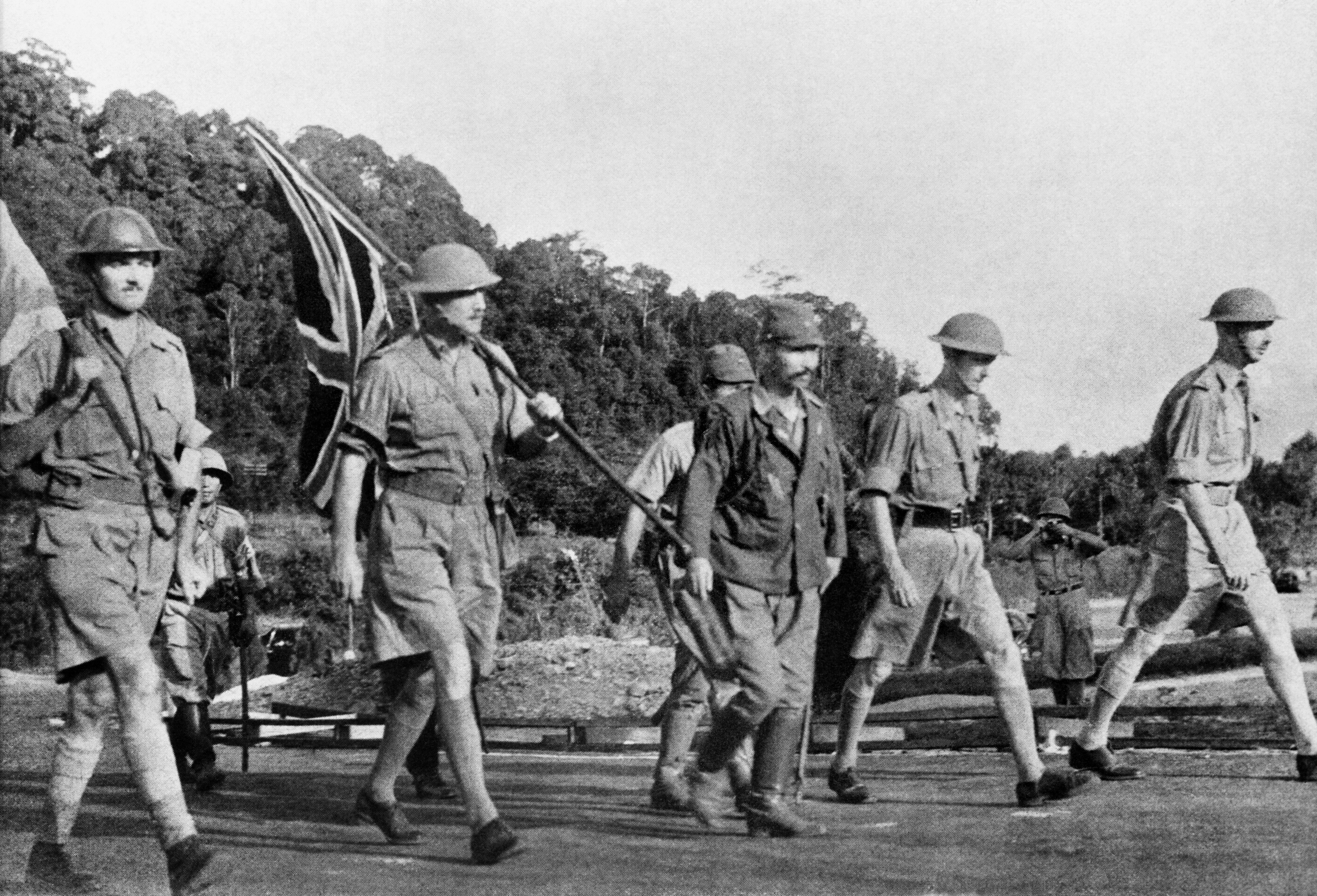
Sugita (middle) leading Lt. Gen. Percival and his staff to surrender.

Due to his experience as a military attaché at the Japanese Embassy in the United States around 1936, Sugita was opposed to starting a war against the United States, but he did not have the ear of the higher officers. He participated in the Malayan campaign as an intelligence officer for the general staff of the Twenty-Fifth Army. On 15 February 1942, during surrender negotiations at the conclusion of the campaign, he served as General Tomoyuki Yamashita's interpreter of English, and drafted the text of the surrender document of Singapore alongside British lieutenant general Arthur Percival.

Later in 1942, during the Guadalcanal campaign, he was sent to the battlefield by Imperial General Headquarters (IGH), assisting the 2nd Division. With the formation of the Eighth Area Army, he was transferred to Rabaul. He filed a report with IGH that the Japanese position in Guadalcanal was untenable. Although he was regarded as a "negative staff officer", IGH decided to withdraw forces from the island. Sugita prepared a withdrawal plan on behalf of Kumao Imoto, who was fighting a case of dengue fever but who as the superior officer is generally credited with the successful evacuation of Japanese troops carried out between 14 January and 7 February 1943 (Operation Ke).

Feeling that IGH were dismissive of intelligence reports, Sugita formed an informal group to devise strategy. During the Battle of the Bismarck Sea (2–4 March 1943), Colonel Sugita, as part of the plan to establish a headquarters staff in Lae, was traveling with a Japanese convoy of sixteen ships aboard the destroyer Tokitsukaze, which was hit by an Allied air attack. Sugita and other survivors were transferred to the destroyer Yukikaze and returned to Rabaul.

== Post-war ==
Upon the surrender of Japan, Sugita was immediately ordered back to Japan, and became the Executive Secretary to Prime Minister Prince Naruhiko Higashikuni, acting as liaison with Douglas MacArthur's Chief of Staff, Lieutenant General Richard K. Sutherland.

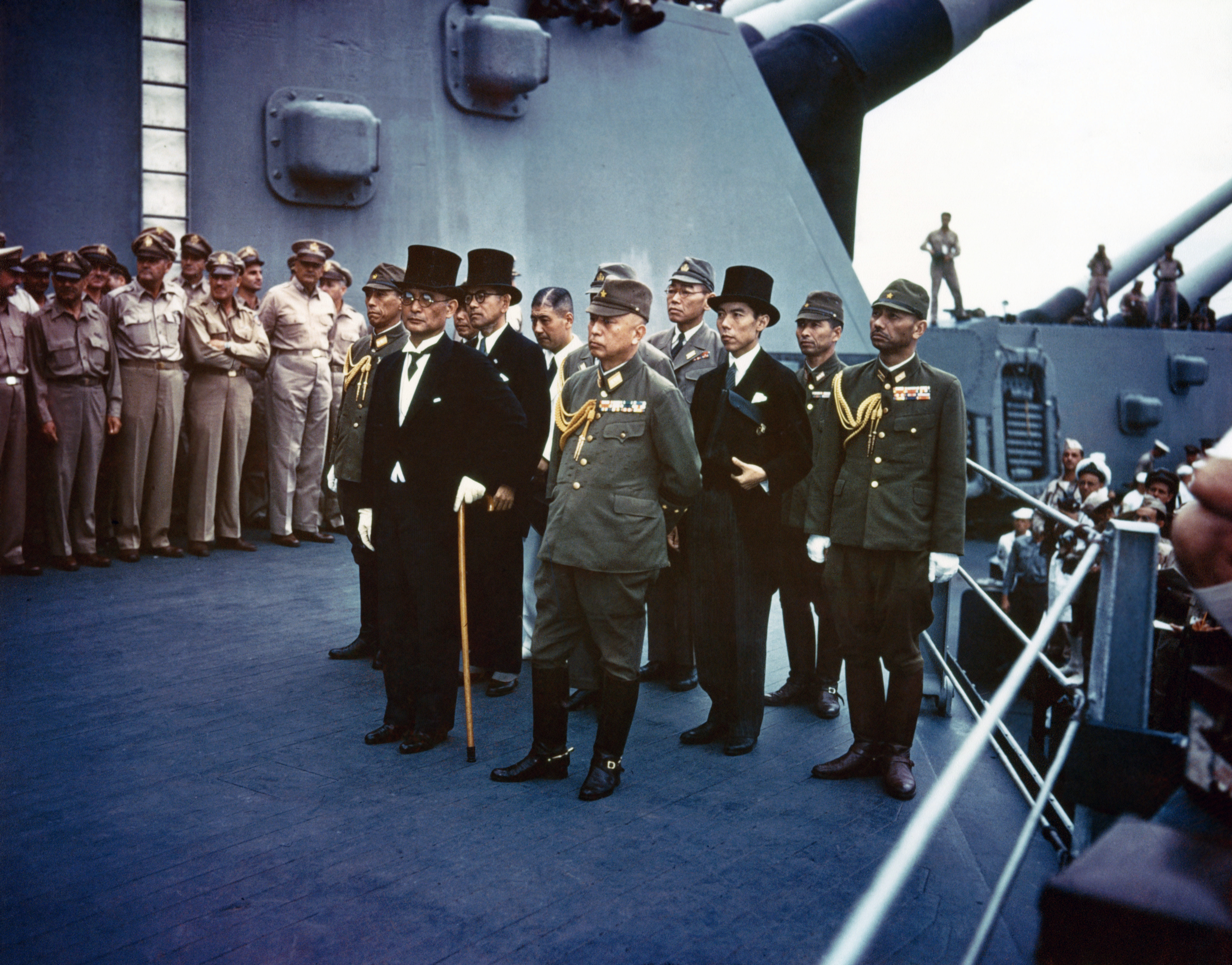
The surrender of Japan on the USS Missouri

His account of the surrender was incorporated into the A Nation Reborn: A short history of postwar Japan, edited by Jun Etō. Sugita was a member of the Japanese delegation that signed the Instrument of Surrender on 2 September 1945 aboard the USS Missouri, the second surrender ceremony that both he and Lieutenant-General Percival attended.

Soon after the war, Sugita visited Singapore as a member of a committee to report on the war crimes trial of the Sook Ching purge of February and March 1942. In July 1946, he was held in Sugamo Prison, pursuant to accusations made by Colonel Cyril Hew Dalrymple Wild, a British War Crime Liaison Officer. When Colonel Wild was killed in a plane crash on his way to Singapore on 12 September 1946, Sugita was released, and then became a witness for the prosecution.

Between March 1960 and March 1962, he served as Chief of Staff of the Japan Ground Self-Defense Force, with the rank of general. During a tour of U.S. military bases on 7 March 1961, he visited Fort Myer, Virginia, where he met with U.S. General George H. Decker, Chief of Staff of the U.S. Army.
