= Braughing railway station =

Disused railway station in Braughing, Hertfordshire

Braughing
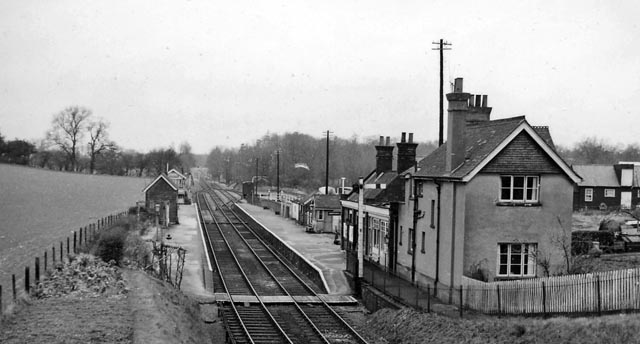
- The station in 1961

General information
- Location: Braughing, Hertfordshire; England
- Coordinates: 51.8988°N 0.0189°E
- Grid reference: TL393148
- Platforms: 2

Other information
- Status: Disused

History
- Original company: Great Eastern Railway
- Post-grouping: London and North Eastern Railway; British Railways (Eastern Region)

Key dates
- 3 July 1863: Opened
- 16 November 1964: Closed
Location

Braughing railway station served the village of Braughing, Hertfordshire, England, from 1863 to 1964 on the Buntingford branch line.

== History ==
The station was opened on 3 July 1863 by the Great Eastern Railway. It was situated in the south side of Station Road, which is on the B1368, and approximately 0.7 miles/1 km from the centre of Braughing village. The up platform features the station building and at the north end of the down platform was the signal box that controlled access to the goods yard. This had a goods shed, a siding that served a cattle dock and capacity for 50 wagons. These facilities were withdrawn on 7 September 1964. The station closed on 16 November 1964. The platform and station building still remain. These have been recently rebuilt and maintained. The station features in the film Happy Ever After (1954 film).

Horace Ribbons was appointed the last stationmaster at Braughing in 1942, remaining in post until the line closed to passengers in November 1964. His grandson, Ian Ribbins, now lives at the former station.

In 2026, National Highways announced their intention to infill the bridge to the south of the station as inspections revealed significant corrosion in the steel beams. An online petition against the infill scheme secured its 2,000th signature (as of September 2026) and 107 people attended a protest at the site on Sunday, 6 September 2026.

Preceding station	Disused railways	Following station
West Mill; Line and station closed	Great Eastern Railway; Buntingford branch line	Standon; Line and station closed
