= Standon railway station =

Disused railway station in Standon, Hertfordshire

Standon
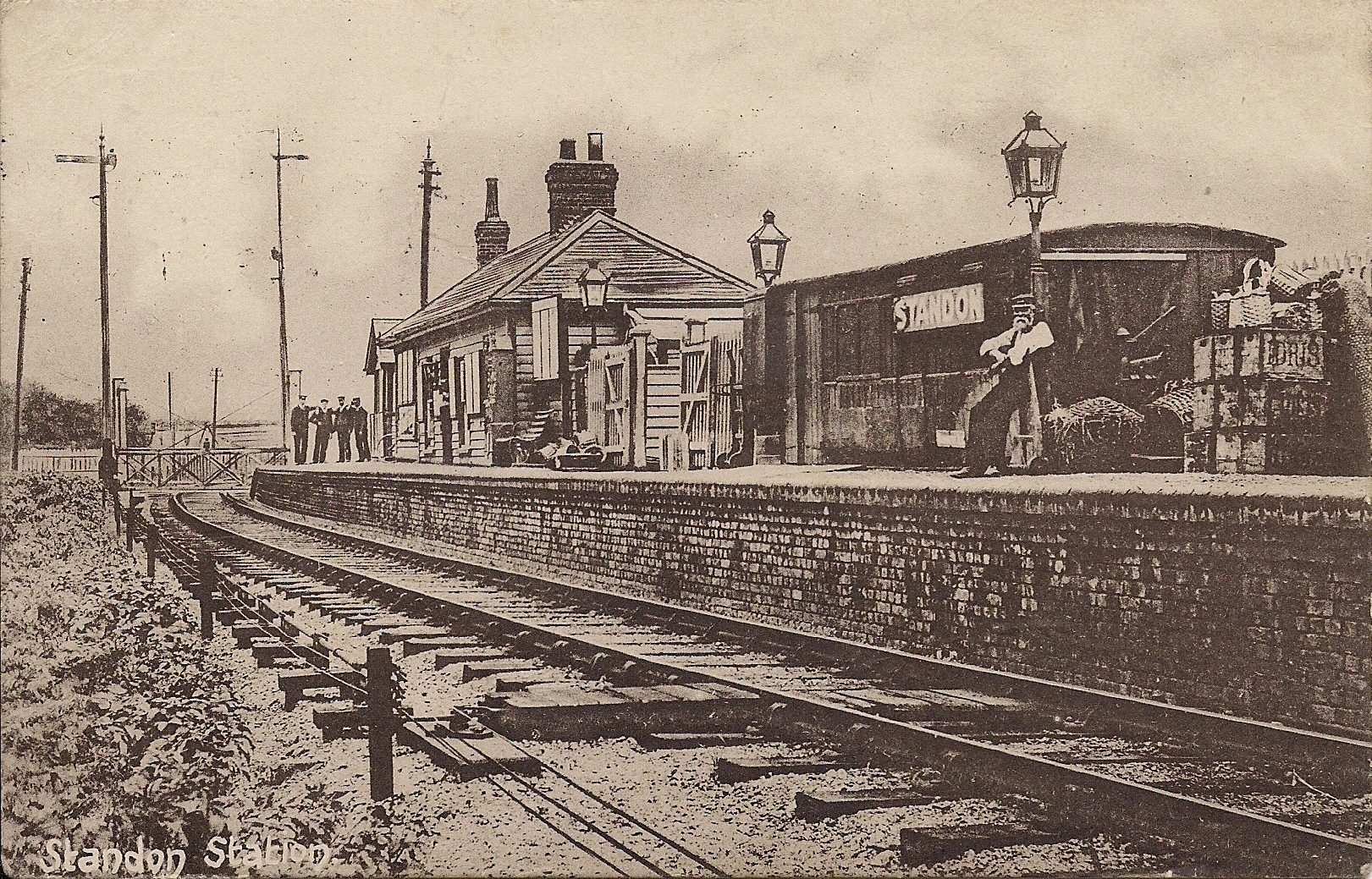
- The station in 1905

General information
- Location: Standon, Hertfordshire; England
- Coordinates: 51.8843°N 0.0255°E
- Grid reference: TL394225
- Platforms: 1

Other information
- Status: Disused

History
- Original company: Great Eastern Railway
- Post-grouping: London and North Eastern Railway; British Railways (Eastern Region)

Key dates
- 3 July 1863: Opened
- 16 November 1964: Closed to passengers
- 20 September 1965: Closed to goods
Location

Standon railway station served the village of Standon, Hertfordshire, England, from 1863 to 1965 on the Buntingford branch line.

== History ==
The station was opened on 3 July 1863 by the Great Eastern Railway. It was rebuilt in 1869 after a fire destroyed the wooden buildings. On the up side was the signal box which controlled the level crossing and three sidings which serve the goods yard on the down side. A private siding also served the nearby Standon Paper Mill. The station closed to passengers on 16 November 1964 and closed to goods on 20 September 1965.

Preceding station	Disused railways	Following station
Braughing; Line and station closed	Great Eastern Railway; Buntingford branch line	Hadham; Line and station closed
