= Mardock railway station =

Disused railway station in Wareside, Hertfordshire

Mardock
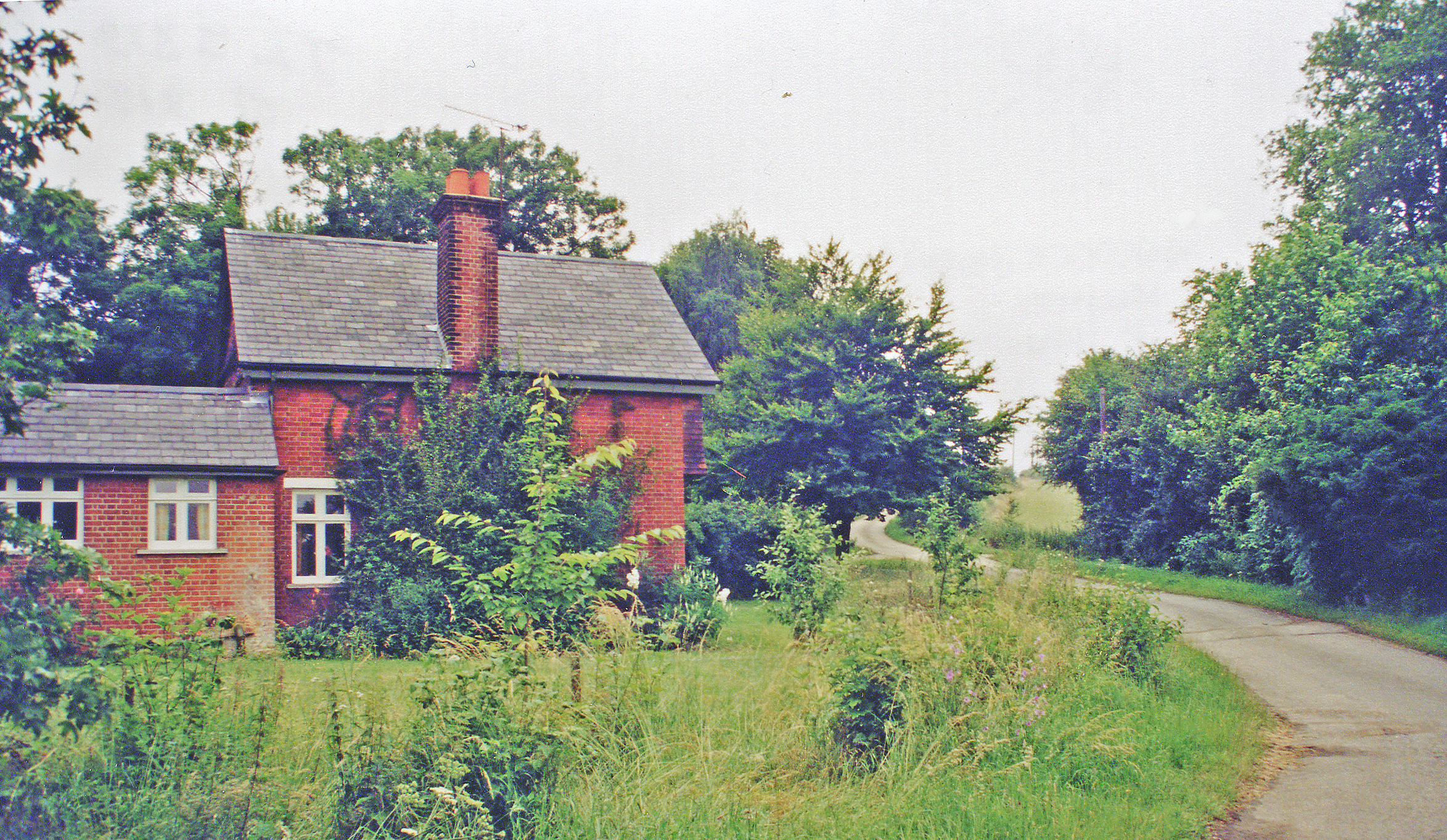
- The site of the station, looking southwest towards St Margarets, in 2000

General information
- Location: Wareside, Hertfordshire; England
- Coordinates: 51.8145°N 0.0194°E
- Grid reference: TL393148
- Platforms: 1

Other information
- Status: Disused

History
- Original company: Great Eastern Railway
- Post-grouping: London and North Eastern Railway; British Railways (Eastern Region)

Key dates
- 3 July 1863: Opened
- 16 November 1964: Closed
Location

Mardock railway station served the village of Wareside, Hertfordshire, England, from 1863 to 1964 by the Buntingford branch line.

== History ==
The station was opened on 3 July 1863 by the Great Eastern Railway. It was situated on the west side of the road leading to Mardocks Farm. It was known as Mardocks in RCH handbook and Mardock for Wakeside in the 1882 Great Eastern Railway timetable as well as the 1880s editions of Bradshaw. On the north side of the level crossing was a signal box that controlled a siding which served a goods yard and a cattle dock. Goods services ceased on 6 March 1961. The station closed on 16 November 1964. The station building was demolished in 1975.

Preceding station	Disused railways	Following station
Widford; Line and station closed	Great Eastern Railway; Buntingford branch line	St Margarets; Line closed, station open
