= Button Snap =

General information
- Type: cottage
- Location: Westmill, Hertfordshire SG9 9NN England
- Coordinates: 51.9201°N 0.0398°W
- Completed: 17th century

Technical details
- Floor count: 2

Button Snap is a 17th-century cottage in northeast Hertfordshire, that has been associated with the writer Charles Lamb. It is on a rural gravel road west of the village of Westmill. It has been listed Grade II on the National Heritage List for England since February 1967.

Button Snap cottage, located about 1,200 feet (370 m) northwest of Cherry Green Farm and Fancy Hall, is significant for several reasons. First, it has changed little, excepting for a possible later extension, since it was built. It is therefore a good example of a traditional cottage with a roof of thatched straw. The heritage listing for Button Snap describes its construction as "Timber frame roughcast on plastered red brick sill". A number of other thatched-roof cottages, known as Cherry Green, exist nearby.

This cottage has a unique history. It was originally owned by Francis Field, the uncle of the writer Charles Lamb. In 1812 Field's widow conveyed this property to Lamb, who lived in the cottage until 1815, when he sold it. Lamb mentioned this house in an essay, "My First Play." Lamb even apparently gave the cottage its name of Button Snap.

The cottage has two ceramic plaques on either side of the front door that tell of its connection to Lamb. A small bust of Lamb is next to the road (at the verge) in front of the cottage, as well. This cottage was privately owned for many years. In 1947 the owner presented Button Snap to the Royal Arts Society. Two years later the Society sold the property to the Charles Lamb Society, which leased it to tenants. Because of rising costs of maintaining the structure, it was sold in 1985.
