= Selmenga =

Selmenga Сельменьга
- Settlement
- Location within Arkhangelsk Oblast Location within Russia
- Coordinates: 62°32′N 43°45′E
- Country: Russia
- Region: Arkhangelsk Oblast
- District: Vinogradovsky District
- Time zone: UTC+3:00

Selmenga (Russian: Сельменьга) is a rural locality (a settlement) and the administrative center of Boretskoye Rural Settlement of Vinogradovsky District, Arkhangelsk Oblast, Russia. The population was 994 as of 2010. There are 15 streets.

== Geography ==
Selmenga is located on the Severnaya Dvina River, 70 km southeast of Bereznik (the district's administrative centre) by road. Yakovlevskaya is the nearest rural locality.
