= West Mill railway station =

Disused railway station in Westmill, Hertfordshire

West Mill

General information
- Location: Westmill, Hertfordshire; England
- Coordinates: 51.9264°N 0.0047°W
- Grid reference: TL373272
- Platforms: 1

Other information
- Status: Disused

History
- Original company: Great Eastern Railway
- Post-grouping: London and North Eastern Railway; British Railways (Eastern Region)

Key dates
- 3 July 1863: Opened
- 16 November 1964: Closed
Location

West Mill railway station served the village of Westmill, Hertfordshire, England, from 1863 to 1964 on the Buntingford branch line.

== History ==
The station was opened on 3 July 1863 by the Great Eastern Railway. It was situated on the north side of a minor road. It was known as Westmill until 1883 in the railway handbook. On the up side was a goods siding with a goods shed adjacent to it. The goods facilities closed on 7 September 1964 and the station closed on 16 November 1964.

Preceding station	Disused railways	Following station
Buntingford; Line and station closed	Great Eastern Railway; Buntingford branch line	Braughing; Line and station closed
