= Buntingford railway station =

Disused railway station in England

Coordinates: 51.941804°N 0.016327°W

Buntingford
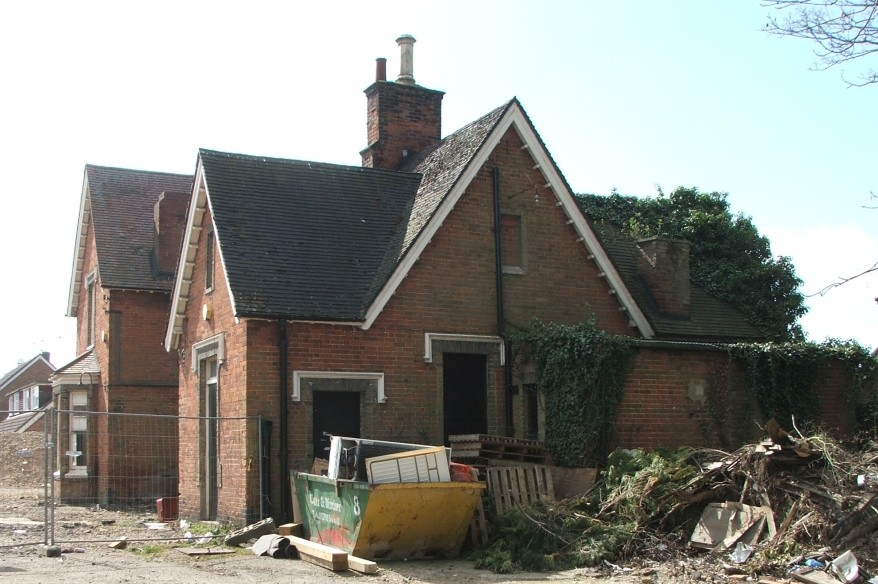
- Buntingford station forecourt in April 2009

General information
- Location: Buntingford, Hertfordshire; England
- Platforms: 1

Other information
- Status: Disused

History
- Original company: Ware, Hadham and Buntingford Railway
- Pre-grouping: Great Eastern Railway
- Post-grouping: London and North Eastern Railway

Key dates
- 3 July 1863: Station opened
- 16 November 1964: Station closed
Location

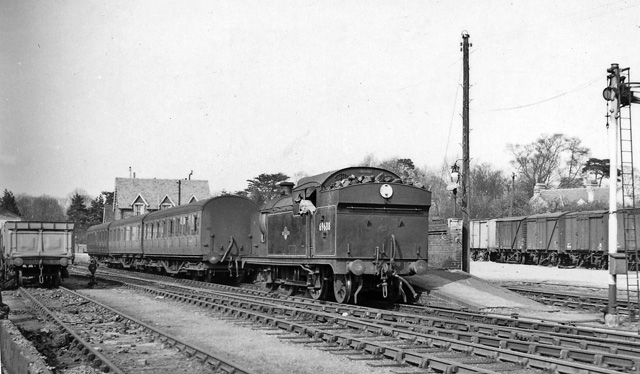
View northward, to buffer-stops in 1959

Buntingford railway station is a former station in Buntingford, Hertfordshire, England. It served as the terminus of a branch from the Hertford East Branch Line.

The station was first opened in 1863 and closed to passengers in 1964.

Preceding station	Disused railways	Following station
West Mill	Ware, Hadham and Buntingford Railway	Terminus
