= Widford railway station =

Disused railway station in Widford, Hertfordshire

Widford

General information
- Location: Widford, Hertfordshire; England
- Coordinates: 51.824°N 0.0416°E
- Grid reference: TL408159
- Platforms: 1

Other information
- Status: Disused

History
- Original company: Great Eastern Railway
- Post-grouping: London and North Eastern Railway; British Railways (Eastern Region)

Key dates
- 3 July 1863: Opened
- 16 November 1964: Closed
Location

Widford railway station served the village of Widford, Hertfordshire, England, from 1863 to 1964 on the Buntingford branch line.

== History ==
The station was opened on 3 July 1863 by the Great Eastern Railway. It was situated on the north side of Ware Road. It had a brick-built waiting room and a booking office. At the east end of the platform was a signal box which controlled a siding leading to a cattle and goods dock. Goods traffic ceased on 7 September 1964. The station closed on 16 November 1964.

After closure, the road bridge to the west of the station was infilled. As of September 2026, the former station site is occupied by a solid fuels company and serves as their depot.

| Preceding station | Disused railways | Following station |
|---|---|---|
| Hadham; Line and station closed | Great Eastern Railway; Buntingford branch line | Mardock; Line and station closed |
