= River Ash, Hertfordshire =

River in Hertfordshire, England

Ash
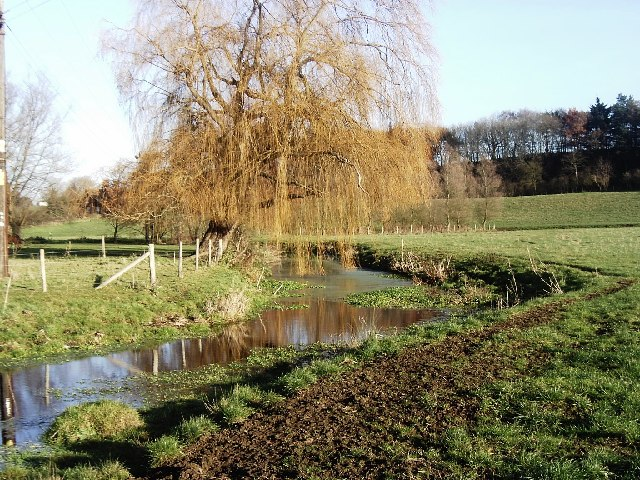

Location
- Country: United Kingdom

Physical characteristics
- Source
  - location: Nr. Brent Pelham, Hertfordshire
  - elevation: 115 m (377 ft)
- Mouth
  - location: Stanstead Abbotts, Hertfordshire into River Lea
  - coordinates: 51°47′56″N 0°0′16.5″W
- Length: 26 km (16 mi)

The River Ash is a tributary of the River Lea which flows through Hertfordshire, England, before joining the Lea near Stanstead Abbots.

The Ash has elements of both a chalk stream and a more erosive river. It is the only tributary of the River Lea to achieve "Good" ecological status along some of its course.

== Course ==
Course of the River Ash

The River Ash originates near the village of Brent Pelham in North Hertfordshire and flows through The Hadhams (Little, Ford and Much), Widford, Wareside, until it reaches the River Lea near Stanstead Abbots.
