= J. B. E. Hittle =

American historian (born 1952)

Jon Bradley Edward Hittle (born 1951) is an American historian, focusing on military and intelligence history of the 19th and 20th centuries.

== Early life and education ==
Hittle was born in Iowa and received a Bachelor of Arts degree in European history from Briar Cliff University and a Master of Arts degree in modern European intellectual history and political theory from Louisiana State University, where his thesis focused on the polemics of Irish Marxist James Connolly.

== Career ==
He is a recognized authority on guerrilla warfare, low-intensity conflict/asymmetrical warfare, counterinsurgency, counterterrorism, counterproliferation and foreign intelligence matters.

He has published articles since the 1980s in journals, including Studies in Intelligence and Proceedings, and he is the author of the book Michael Collins and the Anglo-Irish War: Britain's Counterinsurgency Failure, published in 2011 He has served as an historical advisor for television productions, including the British television program Who Do You Think You Are? on BBC.

Hittle is a decorated former intelligence officer, having served initially as a military analyst and targeting officer and the balance of his career as a field operations officer. He served in Southeast Asia, Central America, Europe and the Middle East. He also served as an Intelligence Specialist and Maritime Security Team (MST) Boarding Officer in the United States Coast Guard.

Hittle is a recipient of THE NATIONAL INTELLIGENCE MEDAL OF ACHIEVEMENT; THE CIA INTELLIGENCE MEDAL OF MERIT; THE CIA's IRAQ OPERATIONS MEDAL; THE CIA 30 YEARS SERVICE MEDAL; multiple MERITORIOUS SERVICE COMMENDATIONS; THE US COAST GUARD UNIT COMMENDATION and THE NATIONAL DEFENSE SERVICE MEDAL.
