= Buntingford branch line =

Former railway line in Hertfordshire, England

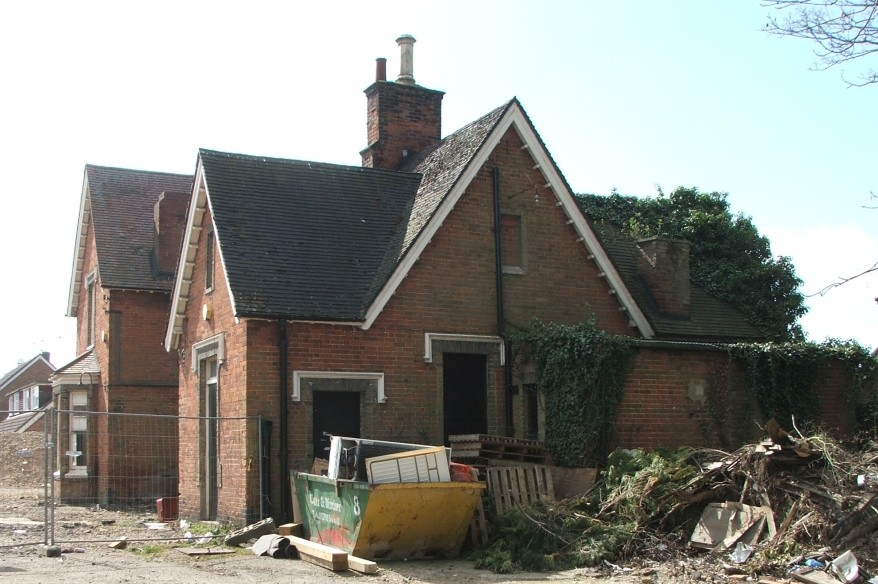
Buntingford station forecourt in April 2009

The Buntingford branch line in Hertfordshire, England, connected Buntingford to the railway network at St Margarets. It was promoted locally and opened in 1863 after overspending its available capital. The line was completed with the assistance of the neighbouring Great Eastern Railway. Residential travel and goods services became significant at the end of the 19th century. The area served by the line was predominantly agricultural, and after 1948 usage did not keep pace with rising costs. When the Hertford East branch was electrified, Buntingford branch trains were reduced in frequency with through trains to London withdrawn. The line was recommended for closure in the Beeching Report, and the passenger service was withdrawn in 1964; goods services closed in 1965.

The line was informally known as The Bunt by the workers on the line.

== Proposals ==
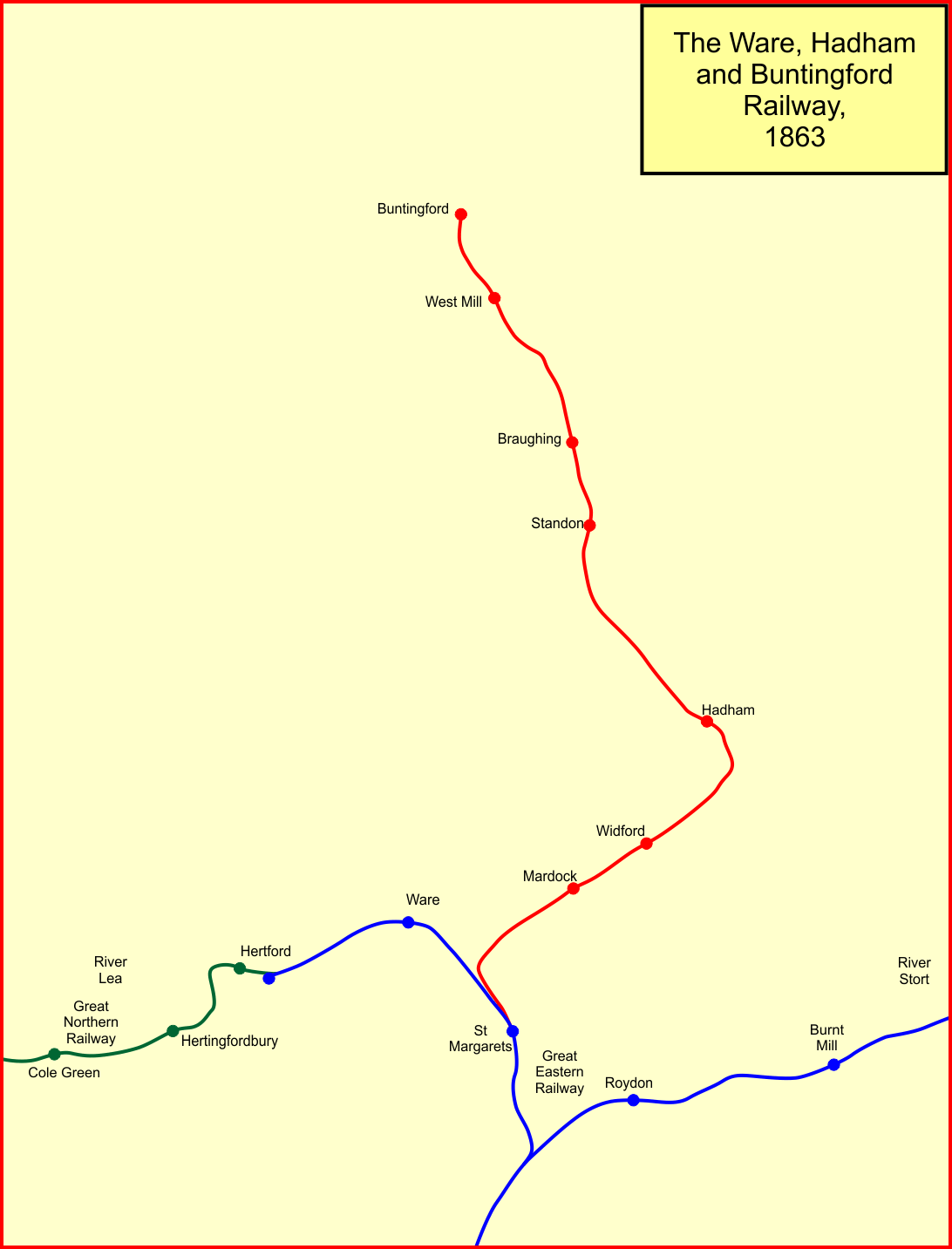
The Buntingford branch line

Buntingford is located on Ermine Street, the road from London to Cambridge and the north, and had a prime position as a trading town before the advent of railways. The town was bypassed by the main line of the Eastern Counties Railway from London to Cambridge via Bishop's Stortford, which opened in stages between 1840 and 1845. The Ware and Hertford branch from Broxbourne was opened by the Northern and Eastern Railway in 1843.

In 1845 during Railway Mania, a grandiose scheme to build a Great Western, Southern and Eastern Counties Railway was proposed to run from Southampton to Ipswich via Bishops Stortford and Hadham. Its cost was clearly unrealistic and it did not proceed. In 1847 George Hudson promoted a Parliamentary Bill for an alternative route to Cambridge, leaving the Hertford branch at Ware and running via Buntingford and Royston to Shelford which failed to gain approval.

== Authorisation ==
Ware, Hadham and Buntingford Railway Act 1858
- Act of Parliament
- Parliament of the United Kingdom
- Long title: An Act for making a Railway from the Hertford and Ware Branch of the Eastern Counties Railway to Buntingford.
- Citation: 21 & 22 Vict. c. xcvii

Dates
- Royal assent: 12 July 1858

On 1 August 1856, a meeting of 150 landowners was held at the George and Dragon Hotel in Buntingford, to discuss promoting a branch line to Buntingford. A local promoter, George Mickley, estimated £70,000 to construct ten miles of single track railway and £30,000 for land and stations, making a total of £100,000. Annual receipts were forecast to be £10,083, and a 5% profit was expected. A second meeting was held on 28 August, and it was reported that there was no opposition locally when people were circulated by letter. It was decided to proceed. A parliamentary bill was submitted in November 1857. The bill passed through Parliament and royal assent was granted for the Ware, Hadham and Buntingford Railway Act 1858 (21 & 22 Vict. c. xcvii) on 12 July 1858, authorising the Ware, Hadham and Buntingford Railway with authorised share capital of £50,000.

A tender of £44,000 to build the line was accepted from W. S. Simpson of Ely; the engineer was Henry Palfrey Stephenson and the first sod was cut at a ceremony on 20 July 1859.

Ware, Hadham and Buntingford Railway (Deviation) Act 1861
- Act of Parliament
- Parliament of the United Kingdom
- Long title: An Act to enable the Ware, Hadham, and Buntingford Railway Company to make a Deviation in the authorized Line of their Railway; and for other Purposes.
- Citation: 24 & 25 Vict. c. cxciii

Dates
- Royal assent: 22 July 1861

While land was being acquired, opposition was encountered from a landowner near Ware, and the decision was taken to alter the route to join the Hertford branch at St Margaret's instead of Ware. Many other difficulties were encountered in acquiring land. A deviation bill was submitted in 1860 to improve the gradients and shorten the line which gained royal assent on 22 July 1861 as the Ware, Hadham and Buntingford Railway (Deviation) Act 1861 (24 & 25 Vict. c. cxciii). The line needed an unusual number of bridges increasing the cost per mile of construction.

There was a shortfall in subscribed capital and the borrowing powers in the company's act of incorporation were conditional on a proportion of the capital having been raised. The directors considered mortgaging the line, but it proved impossible to find a financial house willing to take debenture shares and the company lacked funds.

The line, when completed, was a branch from the Eastern Counties Railway. The Great Northern Railway had a branch line to Hertford from Welwyn and it was possible that the Buntingford line might be sold to the GNR. The ECR agreed to provide financial assistance to the extent of £22,000. Two ECR board members joined the WH&BR board, and the ECR agreed to work the line for 50% of receipts. In 1862 the ECR and other railway companies in East Anglia amalgamated to form the Great Eastern Railway.

By 1863 the line was ready, and a special train was arranged for shareholders to attend the shareholders' meeting in Buntingford. On 10 February 1863 a special train ran from London to Buntingford.

An inspection by the Board of Trade was necessary before passenger operation could start, and Captain J. H. Rich visited the line on 18 April 1863. He was critical, the permanent way was below the required standard and the underbridges were badly constructed, one at Bog Ford Bridge, was reported to have sunk three inches under the inspection train, there were no facing point indicators, no turntable at St Margaret's, and several stations had no distant signals. There was inadequate fencing, and overbridges were not properly fenced on the road approach wing walls.

Ware, Hadham and Buntingford Railway Act 1863
- Act of Parliament
- Parliament of the United Kingdom
- Long title: An Act to enable the Ware, Hadham, and Buntingford Railway Company to raise additional Capital; and for other Purposes.
- Citation: 26 & 27 Vict. c. lxxxviii

Dates
- Royal assent: 22 June 1863

Text of statute as originally enacted

This was a serious blow to the company, which had assumed that early opening was within its grasp. Bog Ford Bridge was reconstructed, a 91-feet depth of piling was required to get a proper foundation. The work committed the company to considerable unforeseen expenditure and a further act of 22 June 1863, the Ware, Hadham and Buntingford Railway Act 1863 (26 & 27 Vict. c. lxxxviii), obtained authorisation to take an additional £40,000 share capital.

== Opening ==
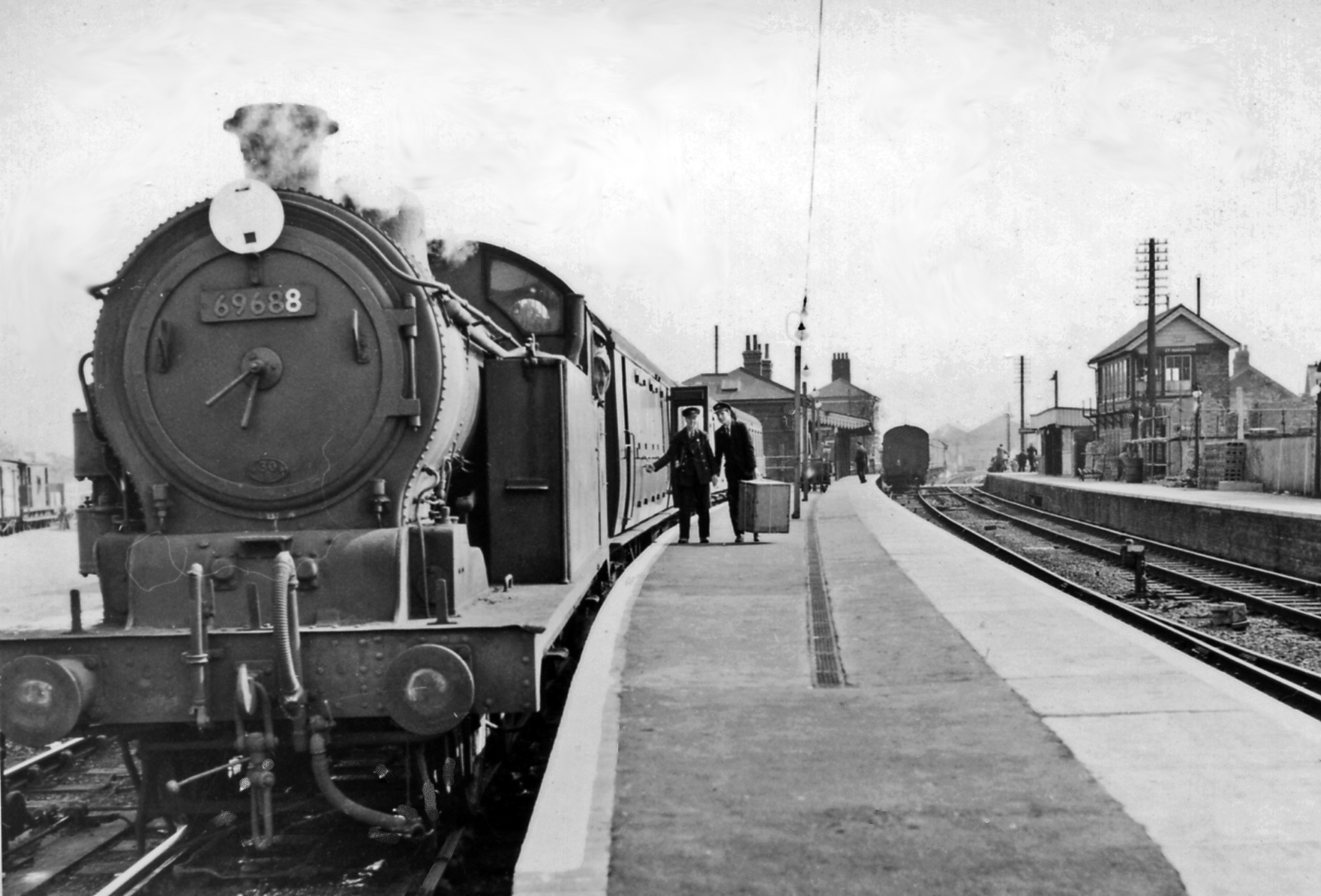
St Margaret's station, with Buntingford branch train

Rectification was put in hand, and on 30 June 1863 Col. Yolland inspected the line. He was not entirely satisfied, but he reluctantly gave approval. The first trains ran on 3 July 1863. There were four trains each way daily and two in Sundays. The journey time of 50 minutes was reduced to 40 minutes from 1 August 1863. There were minimal goods facilities at the beginning. Income for the first quarter year (to 30 September 1863) was £1,221, of which £359 was from goods traffic.

Goods trains caused congestion on the single line, and the board decided that a passing loop at Hadham was required; expenditure of £220 was authorised 24 May 1865; the work was to be done by the GER at the Buntingford company's expense. Braughing followed as a crossing point in 1892.

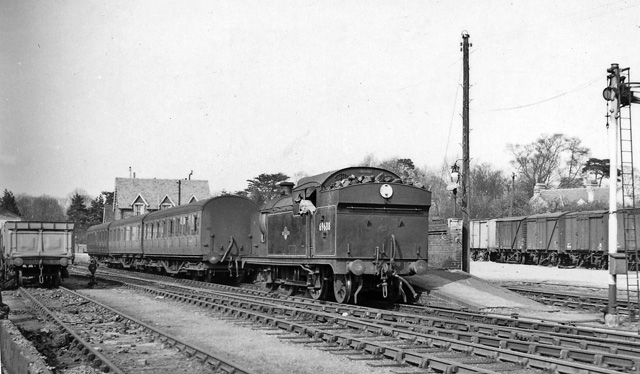
Buntingford station

The line was expensive to build and only completed with finance from the Eastern Counties Railway and its successor company (from 1862), the Great Eastern Railway. The capital subscribed including GER subscription was £106,871 and there were outstanding liabilities of £50,000 and a debenture debt of £29,403. This state of affairs could hardly continue long, and the company wrote to the GER on 21 June 1865, asking them to take over the line. The board admitted that they were "not yet in a state to pay a dividend".

Walter Bentinck had debenture bonds due on 10 February 1866. The company was unable to pay, and Bentinck took them to the Court of Chancery where he obtained judgment in his favour for £3,039, "payable in land if not in cash". The company had no cash and no spare land, so the matter escalated, and in the end the GER paid Bentinck in order to settle the matter in November 1866. On 7 March 1867, the GER, realising that the initiative rested with it, wrote to the company suggesting absorption. Its motivation was that the Great Northern Railway might get control of the Buntingford company and use it to gain entry into GER territory.

Shareholders of the Buntingford Company met on 26 March 1867 and voted in favour of selling to the GER; the deed of transfer was ratified on 30 July 1868, effective on 1 September 1868.

Due to poor usage, Widford station was closed after 31 December 1868 but a petition was raised locally and it reopened on 1 April 1869.

== Change in the late 19th century ==
Safety improvements were demanded by the Board of Trade, and the block telegraph system was installed between St Margaret's and Mardock, operational from June 1888. it was extended to the end of the line between 1892 and 1893 at a cost of £15,277.

From this period the revenue increased as commuting became an important business; in addition goods usage on the line was brisk. By 1900, seven trains operated each way daily, with two on Sundays; the journey time was 35 minutes, and there were three goods trains each way daily. From July 1915 the passenger service reached its peak, with eleven trains in each direction.

A local bus operator started passenger services from 1920, but the London residential traffic was gaining strength; from 1922 there was a homeward through train from London, although the counterpart London-direction through train did not start until 1939.

== From 1923 ==
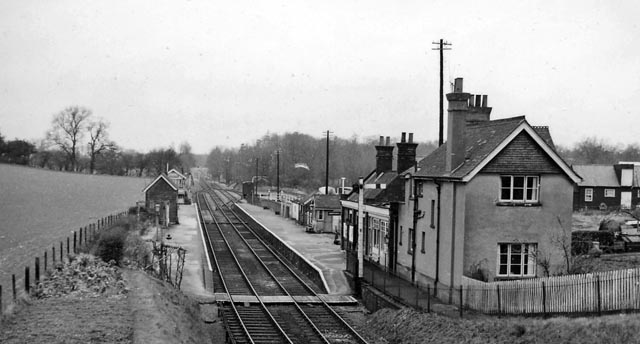
Braughing railway station

In 1953 a film, including location shots was made at Braughing. The film was set in an Irish village called Rathbarney, and Braughing station was made to resemble the fictitious station. The film had the working title O'Leary Night, but was released in 1954 as Happy Ever After; it also had the title Tonight's the Night.

Sunday services were withdrawn from the passenger timetable after 18 September 1955.

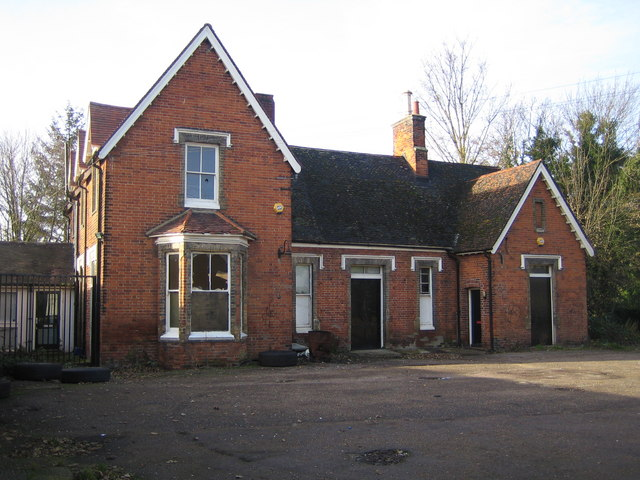
Buntingford former railway station

From 15 June 1959, diesel multiple units were introduced on the passenger services; for some time they were unreliable. Through trains to London from the branch were withdrawn at this time. In 1960 the Hertford East branch was electrified effective from 21 November 1960 and the Buntingford branch timetable was altered to suit connections with the electric trains in the morning and evening peaks, except on Saturdays.

In 1961 another film was shot on the branch: West Mill station was used to film Postman's Knock. Spike Milligan played a naive country postman who unwittingly foils an attempted train robbery.

== Closure ==
By the 1960s, the area served by the branch had not developed as a residential area for commuters, and when the Beeching Report was published, the branch was recommended for closure. The passenger service was withdrawn from 14 November 1964, and the final goods train ran on 17 September 1965.

== Topography ==
- St Margarets; opened 31 October 1843; relocated west of level crossing 3 July 1863; still open;
- Mardock; opened 3 July 1863; closed 16 November 1964; alternatively known as Mardocks in early years;
- Widford; opened 3 July 1863; closed 16 November 1964;
- Hadham; opened 3 July 1863; closed 16 November 1964;
- Standon; opened 3 July 1863; closed 16 November 1964;
- Braughing; opened 3 July 1863; closed 16 November 1964;
- West Mill; opened 3 July 1863; closed 16 November 1964;
- Buntingford; opened 3 July 1863; closed 16 November 1964.

There were passing loops at Braughing and Hadham.

The route was 13.8 miles (22.2 km) in length.

The line was steeply graded, rising at gradients of up to 1 in 63 as far as the summit of the line about three-quarters of a mile beyond Hadham. After that the line falls at 1 in 56, with more moderate gradients from there to the terminus.
