= Grade II* listed buildings in East Hertfordshire =

There are over 20,000 Grade II* listed buildings in England. This page is a list of these buildings in the district of East Hertfordshire in Hertfordshire.

== List ==
Name	Location	Type	Completed (Note: The date given is the date used by Historic England as significant for the initial building or that of an important part in the structure's description.)	Date designated	Grid ref. (Note: The grid reference is based on the British national grid reference system, sometimes known as OSGB36, used by the Ordnance Survey.) Geo-coordinates	Entry number (Note: The "List Entry Number" is a unique number assigned to each listed building and scheduled monument by Historic England.)	Image
Church of St Mary	Church End, Albury, East Hertfordshire	Parish Church	13th century	22 February 1967	TL4355924734; 51°54′10″N 0°05′07″E	1308146	Church of St Mary More images
Ardeley Bury (700m to west of Church)	Ardeley	Country House	Late 17th century	19 October 1951	TL3012127125; 51°55′39″N 0°06′33″W	1101447	Upload Photo
Cromer Windmill	Cromer, Ardeley	Windmill	c. 1222	22 February 1967	TL3045228642; 51°56′28″N 0°06′13″W	1101453	Cromer Windmill More images
Farmhouse at Chapel Farm including Former Congregational Chapel	Wood End, Ardeley	Farmhouse	Late 16th century	31 May 1984	TL3256325473; 51°54′43″N 0°04′27″W	1101421	Farmhouse at Chapel Farm including Former Congregational Chapel More images
Farmhouse at Cromer Farm	Cromer, Ardeley	Farmhouse	Late 16th century or early 17th century	19 October 1951	TL2970228225; 51°56′15″N 0°06′53″W	1101451	Upload Photo
Parish Church of St Mary the Virgin	Aston	Parish Church	c. 1230	24 November 1966	TL2716722614; 51°53′15″N 0°09′13″W	1101433	Parish Church of St Mary the Virgin More images
Waterbridge	Frogmore Hill, Aston	House	c. 1910	24 November 1966	TL2857121412; 51°52′35″N 0°08′01″W	1347945	Upload Photo
43 and 45 Benington Road	Aston	Timber Framed House	Mid-late 16th century	31 May 1984	TL2754022722; 51°53′18″N 0°08′53″W	1175062	Upload Photo
Bayford House	Bayford	House	Early 17th century	24 November 1966	TL3060707990; 51°45′19″N 0°06′33″W	1101707	Upload Photo
Bayfordbury	Bayford	Country House	1759-62	20 October 1952	TL3153610448; 51°46′38″N 0°05′41″W	1176752	Bayfordbury More images
Church of St Mary	Bayford	Church	Medieval	24 November 1966	TL3097408840; 51°45′47″N 0°06′13″W	1101712	Church of St Mary More images
Benington Bury and Peterscourt	Benington	House	Sold 1914	20 October 1952	TL2973423913; 51°53′55″N 0°06′57″W	1101374	Upload Photo
Benington Lordship	Benington	Country House	Late 17th century	24 November 1966	TL2965923660; 51°53′47″N 0°07′01″W	1101404	Benington Lordship More images
The Bell Public House	Benington	Cross Passage House	late medieval	20 October 1952	TL2992723569; 51°53′44″N 0°06′47″W	1101413	The Bell Public House More images
Black Lion Inn	Bishop's Stortford	House	Early 17th century	18 October 1949	TL4877621391; 51°52′17″N 0°09′35″E	1101601	Black Lion Inn More images
Boar's Head Inn	Bishop's Stortford	House	Late 16th century	18 October 1949	TL4859821372; 51°52′16″N 0°09′25″E	1176189	Boar's Head Inn More images
10, High St (formerly Tissimans)	Bishop's Stortford	House	Early 19th century	18 October 1949	TL4865821400; 51°52′17″N 0°09′28″E	1101615	10, High St (formerly Tissimans)
8, High St (formerly Tissimans)	Bishop's Stortford	House	16th century	18 October 1949	TL4866621401; 51°52′17″N 0°09′29″E	1101614	8, High St (formerly Tissimans)
Bramfieldbury	Bramfield	House	17th century	24 November 1966	TL2851215397; 51°49′21″N 0°08′12″W	1089159	Bramfieldbury
Braughing Bury	Green End, Braughing	House	Early 17th century	22 February 1967	TL3951925348; 51°54′33″N 0°01′37″E	1347540	Upload Photo
The Brown Bear Public House	Braughing	House	17th century	22 February 1967	TL3975225133; 51°54′26″N 0°01′48″E	1296288	The Brown Bear Public House More images
The Old Rose and Crown	13 Church End, Braughing	Pub/House	c. 1600	22 February 1967	TL3958425218; 51°54′29″N 0°01′40″E	1102331	The Old Rose and Crown
Upp Hall	The Warren, Braughing	Country House	late 16th century or 17th century	19 October 1951	TL4072923954; 51°53′47″N 0°02′38″E	1102282	Upload Photo
Barn at Upp Hall (40m north-west of Mansion)	The Warren, Braughing	Barn	19th century	22 February 1967	TL4090824194; 51°53′55″N 0°02′48″E	1347531	Upload Photo
Beeches Farmhouse	Brent Pelham	Farmhouse	18th century and 19th century	19 October 1951	TL4459530431; 51°57′13″N 0°06′10″E	1307905	Beeches Farmhouse More images
Buckland House	Buckland	House	Early 18th century	22 February 1967	TL3563233818; 51°59′11″N 0°01′35″W	1176027	Upload Photo
Church of St Andrew (Redundant Churches Fund)	Buckland	Parish Church	14th century	22 February 1967	TL3584433857; 51°59′12″N 0°01′23″W	1347742	Church of St Andrew (Redundant Churches Fund) More images
Former Church of St Bartholomew	Buntingford	Parish Church (ruined)	Early 13th century	22 February 1967	TL3693830112; 51°57′10″N 0°00′32″W	1101329	Former Church of St Bartholomew More images
The Almhouses	Buntingford	Almshouse	1684	19 October 1951	TL3627329338; 51°56′45″N 0°01′07″W	1101350	The Almhouses More images
Victoria House	Buntingford	Jettied House	15th century	19 October 1951	TL3623129474; 51°56′50″N 0°01′09″W	1101310	Upload Photo
Broadfield Hall Stables	Broadfield, Cottered	Stable	c. 1619	6 July 1984	TL3244931005; 51°57′42″N 0°04′25″W	1101292	Upload Photo
Holy Trinity Church	Throcking, Cottered	Parish Church	13th century	22 February 1967	TL3383630165; 51°57′14″N 0°03′14″W	1175183	Holy Trinity Church More images
Parish Church of St John the Baptist	Cottered	Parish Church	Mid 14th century	22 February 1967	TL3174629215; 51°56′45″N 0°05′05″W	1101295	Parish Church of St John the Baptist More images
Rumbolds	Flanders Green, Cottered	Jettied House	Early 16th century	22 February 1967	TL3254828501; 51°56′21″N 0°04′24″W	1175297	Upload Photo
Church of All Saints	Datchworth	Church	late 12th century or early 13th century	24 November 1966	TL2677419263; 51°51′27″N 0°09′38″W	1341457	Church of All Saints More images
Staples Cottage	Datchworth	Farmhouse	later 19th century	24 November 1966	TL2759919619; 51°51′38″N 0°08′54″W	1175159	Upload Photo
Church of St Botolph	Eastwick	Parish Church	13th century	24 January 1967	TL4340611651; 51°47′07″N 0°04′39″E	1101264	Church of St Botolph More images
Church of St Mary	Furneux Pelham	Parish Church	Mid 13th century	22 February 1967	TL4316827953; 51°55′54″N 0°04′51″E	1307889	Church of St Mary More images
Furneux Pelham Hall	Furneux Pelham	Manor House	Late 16th century	19 October 1951	TL4284328014; 51°55′56″N 0°04′34″E	1176538	Furneux Pelham Hall More images
Gilston Park, 400m along Drive west-south-west from Cumberland Lodge	Gilston	Country House	1852	24 January 1967	TL4410712906; 51°47′46″N 0°05′18″E	1175745	Gilston Park, 400m along Drive west-south-west from Cumberland Lodge More images
Parish Church of St John the Baptist	Great Amwell	Parish Church	11th century	24 January 1967	TL3718212508; 51°47′40″N 0°00′44″W	1341839	Parish Church of St John the Baptist More images
Aisled Barn at Mundenbury (70m to south-east of House)	Great Munden	Barn	17th century	24 January 1984	TL3561024202; 51°54′00″N 0°01′49″W	1173699	Upload Photo
Farmhouse at High Trees Farm (along Track 200m from Lane)	Great Munden	Cross Passage House	Medieval	4 December 1951	TL3547621945; 51°52′47″N 0°02′00″W	1296238	Upload Photo
Mundenbury (60m to north-north-east of St Nicholas's Church)	Great Munden, Great Munden	House	c. 1700	24 January 1967	TL3555124242; 51°54′01″N 0°01′52″W	1347555	Upload Photo
North Range of Farm Buildings at Peasfield (35m east-north-east of House)	Cherry Green, Great Munden	Farm Building	15th, 16th and 17th century	24 January 1984	TL3507925833; 51°54′53″N 0°02′15″W	1102285	Upload Photo
Parish Church of St Nicholas	Great Munden	Parish Church	Early 12th century	24 January 1967	TL3551924185; 51°53′59″N 0°01′54″W	1173651	Parish Church of St Nicholas More images
Amores including Outbuildings	Hertingfordbury, Hertford	House	Early to Mid 16th century	10 February 1950	TL3073611972; 51°47′28″N 0°06′21″W	1268719	Amores including Outbuildings More images
Bailey Hall	Hertford	House	c. 1700	10 February 1950	TL3268412468; 51°47′42″N 0°04′39″W	1268782	Bailey Hall More images
Bailey Walls, north-east range to Hertford Castle	Hertford Castle, Hertford	Castle	1171-1174	10 February 1950	TL3253112552; 51°47′45″N 0°04′47″W	1268984	Upload Photo
Bailey Walls, south-east range to Hertford Castle	Hertford Castle, Hertford	Castle	1171-1174	10 February 1950	TL3248412433; 51°47′42″N 0°04′49″W	1268985	Bailey Walls, south-east range to Hertford Castle More images
Beadle House	Bull Plain, Hertford	House	1702-1704	10 February 1950	TL3264712687; 51°47′50″N 0°04′40″W	1268974	Beadle House More images
Bengeo Hall	Bengeo, Hertford	House	Early 18th century	10 February 1950	TL3300313792; 51°48′25″N 0°04′20″W	1268712	Upload Photo
Bengeo Hall Stables	Bengeo, Hertford	Stables	Early to Mid 18th century	12 April 1973	TL3295213828; 51°48′26″N 0°04′23″W	1268715	Upload Photo
Bridgeman House	Hertford	House	18th century	10 February 1950	TL3229912268; 51°47′36″N 0°04′59″W	1268681	Upload Photo
Cecil House	Hertford	House	Earlier	10 February 1950	TL3228712587; 51°47′47″N 0°04′59″W	1268744	Cecil House More images
Church of All Saints with St John	Hertford	Church	15th century and earlier	12 April 1973	TL3279912457; 51°47′42″N 0°04′33″W	1268783	Church of All Saints with St John More images
Church of St Mary and St John	Hertingfordbury, Hertford	Parish Church	13th century	10 February 1950	TL3085411948; 51°47′27″N 0°06′15″W	1268722	Church of St Mary and St John More images
County Hall including Terraces and Fountain	Hertford	County hall	1935-1939	9 September 1996	TL3238111943; 51°47′26″N 0°04′55″W	1268807	County Hall including Terraces and Fountain More images
Goldings including Retaining Walls and Steps to Forecourt and Terrace	Goldings, Hertford	Country House	1650-1660	8 April 1968	TL3102914252; 51°48′42″N 0°06′03″W	1268815	Goldings including Retaining Walls and Steps to Forecourt and Terrace More images
Lombard House	Hertford	House	Early 17th century	10 February 1950	TL3260712741; 51°47′51″N 0°04′42″W	1268978	Lombard House More images
Morgans Junior School	Hertford	Elementary School	1948-1949	6 May 1998	TL3255211668; 51°47′17″N 0°04′47″W	1119734	Upload Photo
North Road House	Hertford	Villa	1827-1828	10 February 1950	TL3217912612; 51°47′48″N 0°05′05″W	1268839	Upload Photo
No 43 St Andrew St including St Nicholas Hall	Hertford	Apartment	1950	10 February 1950	TL3234012603; 51°47′47″N 0°04′56″W	1268740	No 43 St Andrew St including St Nicholas Hall More images
Old Cross Wharf	Hertford	Malt House	16th century	9 September 1996	TL3253412724; 51°47′51″N 0°04′46″W	1268795	Old Cross Wharf More images
The Old Vicarage	Hertford	House	17th century	12 April 1973	TL3269412501; 51°47′44″N 0°04′38″W	1268954	Upload Photo
The Red House	Hertford	House	17th century	10 February 1950	TL3289612698; 51°47′50″N 0°04′27″W	1268915	Upload Photo
The Salisbury Arms	Hertford	Timber Framed House	Early 15th century	10 February 1950	TL3267412558; 51°47′45″N 0°04′39″W	1268933	The Salisbury Arms More images
The Walnuts (No 23, Castle St) including Front Railings	Hertford	House	17th century	10 February 1950	TL3257812412; 51°47′41″N 0°04′44″W	1268945	The Walnuts (No 23, Castle St) including Front Railings More images
Warren Park, Warrenfield	Bengeo, Hertford	House	1970	10 February 1950	TL3236913342; 51°48′11″N 0°04′54″W	1269002	Upload Photo
Yeomanry House and attached Front Area Railings	Hertford	House	c. 1725	12 April 1973	TL3236312648; 51°47′49″N 0°04′55″W	1268733	Yeomanry House and attached Front Area Railings More images
3–11 Fore Street	Hertford	Apartment	1950	10 February 1950	TL3264312569; 51°47′46″N 0°04′41″W	1268928	3–11 Fore Street
42 Fore Street	Hertford	Apartment	c. 1825	10 February 1950	TL3270512572; 51°47′46″N 0°04′37″W	1268937	42 Fore Street More images
130 Fore Street	Hertford	House	Early 19th century	10 February 1950	TL3286012643; 51°47′48″N 0°04′29″W	1268918	130 Fore Street
2 St Andrew Street	Hertford	House	Early to Mid 18th century	10 February 1950	TL3243912673; 51°47′49″N 0°04′51″W	1268763	Upload Photo
Main Quadrangle and Memorial Hall attached, at Haileybury and Imperial Service College	Hertford Heath	Teachers House	1806	24 January 1967	TL3580810787; 51°46′45″N 0°01′58″W	1084375	Main Quadrangle and Memorial Hall attached, at Haileybury and Imperial Service College More images
Woolmer's Park with attached Outbuildings and Wall	Letty Green, Hertingfordbury	Country House	18th century	20 October 1952	TL2856510243; 51°46′34″N 0°08′17″W	1089105	Upload Photo
East Barn at Shingle Hall with Wall attached at south-west, 20m north-east of House	Trims Green, High Wych	Wall	Late 16th century	30 April 1985	TL4694317239; 51°50′04″N 0°07′52″E	1220519	Upload Photo
Farmhouse at Blounts Farm	Allen's Green, High Wych	Farmhouse	15th century or early 16th century	22 February 1967	TL4572317946; 51°50′28″N 0°06′50″E	1220692	Upload Photo
Great Barn at Bursteads 35m north-east of House	Trims Green, High Wych	Aisled Barn	16th century	30 April 1985	TL4767217256; 51°50′04″N 0°08′31″E	1290870	Upload Photo
North Barn at Shingle Hall 60m north-north-west of House	Trims Green, High Wych	Aisled Barn	14th century or early 15th century	30 April 1985	TL4688717283; 51°50′05″N 0°07′50″E	1220616	Upload Photo
Parish Church of St James the Great	High Wych	Parish Church	1860-61	22 February 1967	TL4635214131; 51°48′24″N 0°07′17″E	1220513	Parish Church of St James the Great More images
Church of St Nicholas	Great Hormead, Hormead	Parish Church	13th century or earlier	22 February 1967	TL3999229566; 51°56′49″N 0°02′08″E	1101835	Church of St Nicholas More images
Great Hormead Dane	Great Hormead, Hormead	Cross Passage House	Late 16th century	22 February 1967	TL4041630141; 51°57′07″N 0°02′31″E	1176619	Upload Photo
Hare Street House	Hare Street, Hormead	Timber Framed House	16th century	19 October 1951	TL3903729830; 51°56′59″N 0°01′18″E	1176454	Hare Street House More images
Oak Cottage	Hare Street, Hormead	Cross Wing House	15th century	22 February 1967	TL3902929422; 51°56′45″N 0°01′17″E	1101855	Oak Cottage More images
The Brick House	Great Hormead, Hormead	Tower House	c. 1570	19 October 1951	TL4125831050; 51°57′36″N 0°03′16″E	1307967	Upload Photo
The Old Rectory	Great Hormead, Hormead	Cross Wing House	c. 1500	22 February 1967	TL4033330111; 51°57′06″N 0°02′26″E	1101825	Upload Photo
Old House	Hunsdon	House	Late Medieval	4 December 1951	TL4181414435; 51°48′38″N 0°03′21″E	1307772	Upload Photo
Olives Farm House along Track 220m from Road	Hunsdon	House	Later 17th century	4 December 1951	TL4080712652; 51°47′41″N 0°02′25″E	1101951	Upload Photo
Tanners	Hunsdon	Farmhouse	Later 19th century	24 January 1967	TL4163314054; 51°48′26″N 0°03′11″E	1347692	Upload Photo
The Big Black Barn at Hunsdon Lodge Farm 500m along Track	Hunsdon	Barn	18th century	14 April 1983	TL4243614364; 51°48′35″N 0°03′53″E	1101968	The Big Black Barn at Hunsdon Lodge Farm 500m along Track
The Pump House	Hunsdon	House	17th century	24 January 1967	TL4181814172; 51°48′30″N 0°03′20″E	1176452	Upload Photo
Little Berkhamsted House	Little Berkhamsted	House	1732	20 October 1952	TL2926707988; 51°45′20″N 0°07′43″W	1341452	Upload Photo
Stratton's Tower	Little Berkhamsted	House	1986	24 November 1966	TL2949508107; 51°45′24″N 0°07′31″W	1341449	Stratton's Tower More images
Ashmeads	Hadham Ford, Little Hadham	House	c. 1600	22 February 1967	TL4355221678; 51°52′31″N 0°05′02″E	1210460	Upload Photo
Clintons	Bury Green, Little Hadham	House	16th century	19 October 1951	TL4497420984; 51°52′07″N 0°06′15″E	1290634	Upload Photo
Fiddlers Croft 250m along Drive beside Stonehouse Farm	Little Hadham	House	c. 1603	22 February 1967	TL4446322412; 51°52′54″N 0°05′51″E	1290063	Fiddlers Croft 250m along Drive beside Stonehouse Farm
Gatehouse Range at Hadham Hall 60m west of Hall	Little Hadham	Privy House	Early 16th century	22 February 1967	TL4517822766; 51°53′04″N 0°06′29″E	1211100	Gatehouse Range at Hadham Hall 60m west of Hall More images
Hadham Hall (Hadham Hall School)	Little Hadham	House	15th century	19 October 1957	TL4524922765; 51°53′04″N 0°06′32″E	1211099	Hadham Hall (Hadham Hall School) More images
Lodge Farmhouse 140m from Road	Hadham Ford, Little Hadham	House	Mid 19th century	30 April 1985	TL4300022162; 51°52′47″N 0°04′34″E	1290605	Upload Photo
Lower Farmhouse	Bury Green, Little Hadham	House	17th century	19 October 1951	TL4521020981; 51°52′07″N 0°06′28″E	1290740	Upload Photo
May Cottage and Gouldburn	Hadham Ford, Little Hadham	House	16th century	30 April 1985	TL4358421699; 51°52′31″N 0°05′04″E	1210437	Upload Photo
The Old Brick House and No. 2 Ford Hill	Hadham Ford, Little Hadham	House	17th century	22 February 1967	TL4354821597; 51°52′28″N 0°05′02″E	1210461	Upload Photo
The Whare	Little Hadham	Hall House	17th century	22 February 1967	TL4402222747; 51°53′05″N 0°05′28″E	1220772	Upload Photo
Westfield	Westland Green, Little Hadham	House	Mid 17th century	30 April 1985	TL4236521512; 51°52′26″N 0°04′00″E	1211024	Upload Photo
Burnside Cottage & Hunts Cottage	Dane End, Little Munden	House	17th century	24 January 1967	TL3324421329; 51°52′29″N 0°03′57″W	1102267	Upload Photo
Church of St Mary	Meesdenbury, Meesden	Parish Church	Early 12th century	22 February 1967	TL4389532557; 51°58′22″N 0°05′36″E	1347765	Church of St Mary More images
Bishops Folly, the Palace, the Palace East & the Palace West	Much Hadham	Bishops Palace	Until 1647	19 October 1951	TL4307019722; 51°51′28″N 0°04′34″E	1213683	Upload Photo
Camwell Hall Farmhouse	Much Hadham	Farmhouse	Late 16th century	22 February 1967	TL4174617613; 51°50′21″N 0°03′22″E	1211348	Upload Photo
Farmhouse at Yewtree Farm	Hadham Cross, Much Hadham	Continuous Jetty House	c. 1600	19 October 1951	TL4263718524; 51°50′50″N 0°04′10″E	1213270	Upload Photo
Hoglands	Perry Green, Much Hadham	House	17th century	22 February 1967	TL4384317429; 51°50′13″N 0°05′11″E	1213427	Hoglands More images
Stable Block and adjoining Cottages at Moor Place	Kettle Green, Much Hadham	House	Early-mid 18th century	22 February 1967	TL4221818825; 51°51′00″N 0°03′48″E	1289133	Upload Photo
Stable Block at Much Hadham Hall	Much Hadham	Stable	c1726-9	22 February 1967	TL4282019333; 51°51′16″N 0°04′20″E	1212818	Upload Photo
Stable Block at the Lordship	Much Hadham	Stable	Early 18th century	22 February 1967	TL4284419893; 51°51′34″N 0°04′22″E	1212469	Upload Photo
The Forge, Forge Cottage and Horseshoe Cottage	Much Hadham	House	c. 1600	22 February 1967	TL4276219257; 51°51′13″N 0°04′17″E	1289340	The Forge, Forge Cottage and Horseshoe Cottage More images
The Lordship	Much Hadham	House	16th century and early 17th century	22 February 1967	TL4289019866; 51°51′33″N 0°04′25″E	1289499	The Lordship More images
The Old House	Much Hadham	House	1826	22 February 1967	TL4283219516; 51°51′21″N 0°04′21″E	1365721	The Old House More images
The Red House	Much Hadham	House	c. 1720	22 February 1967	TL4278419369; 51°51′17″N 0°04′18″E	1289286	The Red House
The White House	Much Hadham	House	17th century	22 February 1967	TL4277419291; 51°51′14″N 0°04′18″E	1212950	The White House More images
Church of St Catherine	Sacombe Green, Sacombe	Parish Church	14th century	24 November 1966	TL3360219360; 51°51′25″N 0°03′41″W	1045912	Church of St Catherine More images
Sacombe House with attached Service Blocks and Wall to East	Sacombe	Apartment	1966	24 November 1966	TL3392618977; 51°51′12″N 0°03′25″W	1341455	Sacombe House with attached Service Blocks and Wall to East More images
Aisled Barn 12m east of House at Redericks Farm	Sawbridgeworth	Aisled Barn	C15/C16	2 October 1981	TL4633012827; 51°47′42″N 0°07′14″E	1101617	Upload Photo
Falconers	Sawbridgeworth	House	?C17	2 October 1981	TL4747414180; 51°48′25″N 0°08′16″E	1101677	Upload Photo
Great Hyde Hall	Great Hyde Hall, Sawbridgeworth	Apartment	1978	6 October 1971	TL4958715397; 51°49′02″N 0°10′08″E	1347838	Upload Photo
Lodges at South Entrance to Park of Great Hyde Hall	Great Hyde Hall, Sawbridgeworth	Gate Lodge	c. 1806	6 October 1971	TL4923715084; 51°48′52″N 0°09′49″E	1176335	Lodges at South Entrance to Park of Great Hyde Hall More images
Pishiobury Park Mansion and attached Offices and Garden Walls and Norman Gateway	Pishiobury Park, Sawbridgeworth	Country House	1580-90	6 June 1952	TL4808213412; 51°47′59″N 0°08′46″E	1307762	Pishiobury Park Mansion and attached Offices and Garden Walls and Norman Gateway More images
Stable Block on South of Upper Courtyard at Pishiobury Park	Pishiobury Park, Sawbridgeworth	Gate	18th century	6 June 1952	TL4803513379; 51°47′58″N 0°08′44″E	1176781	Upload Photo
The Market House	Sawbridgeworth	Cross Passage House	16th century	6 June 1952	TL4837614834; 51°48′45″N 0°09′04″E	1101644	The Market House More images
The Red House	Sawbridgeworth	House	c. 1700	6 June 1952	TL4820714883; 51°48′47″N 0°08′55″E	1101683	Upload Photo
19 Knight Street	Sawbridgeworth	House	20 years after 1800-10	2 October 1981	TL4843014996; 51°48′50″N 0°09′07″E	1101680	Upload Photo
40 Knight Street	Sawbridgeworth	House	c. 1720	6 June 1952	TL4838014856; 51°48′46″N 0°09′04″E	1101643	Upload Photo
Barn and Stables adjacent at Plashes Farm (40m north-east of House)	Colliers End, Standon	Timber Framed House	16th century	4 October 1983	TL3799620363; 51°51′53″N 0°00′10″E	1308109	Upload Photo
Chapel at St Edmund's College (RC) (at North End of Main Building)	Old Hall Green, Standon	Chapel	1845-1853	24 January 1967	TL3718022128; 51°52′51″N 0°00′30″W	1308305	Upload Photo
Crown and Falcon Public House	Puckeridge, Standon	Inn	16th century	24 January 1967	TL3863323287; 51°53′27″N 0°00′47″E	1176373	Crown and Falcon Public House More images
Farmhouse at Great Barwick Farm	Standon	Farmhouse	Mid 16th century	24 January 1967	TL3854318865; 51°51′04″N 0°00′36″E	1102382	Upload Photo
Knights Court	Standon	House	16th century or earlier	24 January 1967	TL3962822190; 51°52′51″N 0°01′38″E	1347492	Upload Photo
Standon Lordship West, and Standon Lordship East (on West Back of River Rib 1 Km south of Standon Village)	Standon	Country House	c. 1872	4 December 1951	TL3925721444; 51°52′27″N 0°01′17″E	1347501	Standon Lordship West, and Standon Lordship East (on West Back of River Rib 1 Km south of Standon Village) More images
West Barn at Great Barwick Farm (50m west of House)	Standon	Barn	14th century or earlier	23 November 1983	TL3849218880; 51°51′05″N 0°00′34″E	1102383	Upload Photo
59 High Street	Standon	House	c. 1700	24 January 1967	TL3965222288; 51°52′54″N 0°01′39″E	1176629	59 High Street
54, 56, 58 and 60 High Street	Puckeridge, Standon	Timber Framed House	16th century or earlier	24 January 1967	TL3858523229; 51°53′25″N 0°00′45″E	1347522	54, 56, 58 and 60 High Street More images
59 and 61 Cambridge Road	Colliers End, Standon	House	Early 16th century	24 January 1967	TL3713920746; 51°52′06″N 0°00′34″W	1308335	Upload Photo
All Nations Christian College (Easneye Mansion)	Stanstead Abbots	Country House	1867-8	30 September 1983	TL3806113430; 51°48′09″N 0°00′03″E	1078763	All Nations Christian College (Easneye Mansion) More images
Parish Church of St Andrew	Stanstead Abbotts	Church	1881	24 January 1967	TL3868212151; 51°47′27″N 0°00′34″E	1067774	Parish Church of St Andrew More images
Red Lion Public House	Stanstead Abbotts	Cross Wing House	Late 15th century	4 December 1957	TL3862311929; 51°47′20″N 0°00′30″E	1078754	Red Lion Public House More images
Stanstead Bury	Tarbets Hill, Stanstead Abbotts	Manor House	Late 15th century	4 December 1951	TL3999011190; 51°46′55″N 0°01′41″E	1051056	Upload Photo
Stanstead Hall	Stanstead Abbotts	House	1752	24 January 1967	TL3855611924; 51°47′20″N 0°00′27″E	1078756	Upload Photo
The Baesh Almshouses and attached Forecourt Wall	Stanstead Abbotts	Almshouses	C20	4 December 1951	TL3901511533; 51°47′07″N 0°00′50″E	1078739	The Baesh Almshouses and attached Forecourt Wall
The Clock House	Stanstead Abbotts	House	1951	4 December 1951	TL3866111927; 51°47′20″N 0°00′32″E	1356544	The Clock House More images
Church of St Margaret (St Mary)	St Margarets Village, Stanstead St Margarets	Church	Norman	24 January 1967	TL3803411566; 51°47′09″N 0°00′01″W	1078703	Church of St Margaret (St Mary) More images
Church of St Mary the Virgin	Stapleford	Parish Church	Mid 12th century	24 November 1966	TL3119216863; 51°50′06″N 0°05′50″W	1089119	Church of St Mary the Virgin More images
Church of St Michael and All Angels	Waterford, Stapleford and Waterford	Parish Church	1871-2	11 June 1986	TL3126614668; 51°48′55″N 0°05′50″W	1089122	Church of St Michael and All Angels More images
Marden Hill House, Service Block and Annexe	Marden Hill, Tewin	Apartment	1986	20 October 1952	TL2793613988; 51°48′36″N 0°08′44″W	1366605	Marden Hill House, Service Block and Annexe More images
Queen Hoo Hall	Queen Hoo Hall, Tewin	Country House	c1575-80	20 October 1952	TL2787416129; 51°49′45″N 0°08′45″W	1089097	Queen Hoo Hall More images
Aisled Barn at Thorley Hall 60m north of House	Thorley	Aisled Barn	16th century or earlier	22 February 1967	TL4766218910; 51°50′57″N 0°08′33″E	1213945	Upload Photo
Thorley Hall	Thorley	House	c1390-1414	19 October 1951	TL4768818844; 51°50′55″N 0°08′34″E	1213803	Thorley Hall
Twyford House	Twyford House, Thorley	Apartment	1970	22 February 1967	TL4933119306; 51°51′09″N 0°10′00″E	1213957	Upload Photo
Balhams Hall and the Cottage	High Cross, Thundridge	House	15th century	24 January 1967	TL3626118515; 51°50′55″N 0°01′23″W	1347496	Upload Photo
Fabdens (on North Bank of River Rib)	Thundridge	House	Late 15th century	24 January 1967	TL3718017306; 51°50′15″N 0°00′37″W	1175911	Upload Photo
Farmhouse at Sutes Farm	High Cross, Thundridge	Farmhouse	14th century	4 December 1951	TL3664119000; 51°51′10″N 0°01′03″W	1347494	Upload Photo
Hanbury Manor	Thundridge	Country House	1890-1	24 January 1967	TL3512016289; 51°49′44″N 0°02′26″W	1204101	Hanbury Manor More images
Remains of Old Church of St Mary and All Saints	Thundridge Bury, Thundridge	Wall	17th century	24 January 1967	TL3681017335; 51°50′16″N 0°00′56″W	1077953	Remains of Old Church of St Mary and All Saints More images
Sawtrees Manor	Thundridge	Hall House	15th century or Earlier	24 January 1967	TL3873017973; 51°50′35″N 0°00′45″E	1204250	Upload Photo
Stable Block at Youngsbury (60m north of House)	High Cross, Thundridge	Stable	c. 1769	24 January 1967	TL3688417957; 51°50′36″N 0°00′52″W	1176876	Upload Photo
The Old Waggon	Thundridge	House	Late Medieval	24 January 1967	TL3628318516; 51°50′55″N 0°01′22″W	1102369	Upload Photo
Westmill House	Westmill, Thundridge	House	Early 17th century	24 January 1967	TL3386416299; 51°49′45″N 0°03′32″W	1205184	Upload Photo
Dovecote at Manor Farm (30m south of House)	Walkern	Dovecote	c. 1700	4 February 1959	TL2895426500; 51°55′20″N 0°07′34″W	1175945	Dovecote at Manor Farm (30m south of House) More images
Farmhouse at Bridgefoot Farm	Church End, Walkern	Farmhouse	Mid 15th century	20 October 1952	TL2918426525; 51°55′20″N 0°07′22″W	1347976	Upload Photo
Farmhouse at Manor Farm	Walkern	Farmhouse	c. 1700	20 October 1952	TL2895226539; 51°55′21″N 0°07′34″W	1348003	Upload Photo
Farmhouse at Rooks Nest Farm	Finches End, Walkern	Farmhouse	Mid 17th century	20 October 1952	TL2868725875; 51°55′00″N 0°07′49″W	1176006	Upload Photo
Oakbeam	Walkern	House	c. 1700	24 November 1966	TL2904826645; 51°55′24″N 0°07′29″W	1101353	Oakbeam
The Old Rectory (at North End of Village, to West of Church)	Walkern	House	1984	24 November 1966	TL2917226729; 51°55′27″N 0°07′23″W	1175855	The Old Rectory (at North End of Village, to West of Church)
Amwell House, Hertford Regional College	Ware	House	Early 18th century	8 May 1950	TL3587613962; 51°48′28″N 0°01′50″W	1274726	Amwell House, Hertford Regional College More images
Churchgate House	Ware	Apartment	1995	14 March 1974	TL3569714385; 51°48′42″N 0°01′59″W	1238426	Upload Photo
Gazebo Within the Garden of Former Amwell House	Ware	Gazebo	c. 1768	8 May 1950	TL3567413828; 51°48′24″N 0°02′01″W	1275397	Gazebo Within the Garden of Former Amwell House More images
Gilpin House	Ware	House	Mid 17th century	8 May 1950	TL3573514354; 51°48′41″N 0°01′57″W	1237905	Upload Photo
Nos 61, 61a, 61b, and 63, High St including Doorway to No 59 (not included)	Ware	Jettied House	Late C14-Early 15th century	8 May 1950	TL3575814314; 51°48′40″N 0°01′56″W	1237718	Upload Photo
The French Horn Inn	Ware	Jettied House	16th century	8 May 1950	TL3584814337; 51°48′40″N 0°01′51″W	1237669	Upload Photo
The Manor House	Ware	House	Earlier	8 May 1950	TL3571014485; 51°48′45″N 0°01′58″W	1221873	The Manor House More images
The Old Stables	Ware	House	17th century	14 March 1974	TL3590414333; 51°48′40″N 0°01′48″W	1221845	The Old Stables
Ware Library	Ware	Managers House	Mid-Late 18th century	8 May 1950	TL3565214353; 51°48′41″N 0°02′01″W	1237923	Upload Photo
2 West Street	Ware	Kitchen	c. 1260	14 March 1974	TL3579214344; 51°48′40″N 0°01′54″W	1274208	Upload Photo
1 Bluecoat Yard	Ware	House	Late 17th century	8 May 1950	TL3589614344; 51°48′40″N 0°01′48″W	1221555	Upload Photo
2 Bluecoat Yard	Ware	Timber Framed House	17th century	8 May 1950	TL3589614347; 51°48′40″N 0°01′48″W	1221594	Upload Photo
3–12 Bluecoat Yard	Ware	Houses	Mid 19th century Before 1851	8 May 1950	TL3589414384; 51°48′42″N 0°01′48″W	1217408	3–12 Bluecoat Yard
65, 67, 67a High Street	Ware	House	C20	8 May 1950	TL3573314309; 51°48′39″N 0°01′57″W	1274504	65, 67, 67a High Street
35, 35a, 37a (part) High Street	Ware	Apartment	1995	8 May 1950	TL3585514275; 51°48′38″N 0°01′51″W	1217428	Upload Photo
Fanhams Hall with Buildings on Courtyard	Wareside	Country House/Hotel	Early 18th century	24 January 1967	TL3718615656; 51°49′22″N 0°00′39″W	1281155	Fanhams Hall with Buildings on Courtyard More images
New Hall	Newhall Green, Wareside	House	17th century	24 January 1967	TL3899616214; 51°49′38″N 0°00′56″E	1077970	New Hall
Church of St Andrew and St Mary	Watton-at-Stone	Parish Church	Earlier	24 November 1966	TL3024118881; 51°51′12″N 0°06′37″W	1341464	Church of St Andrew and St Mary More images
Watton Place and attached Garden Wall	Watton at Stone	Kitchen	19th century	20 October 1952	TL2999219422; 51°51′30″N 0°06′50″W	1089070	Watton Place and attached Garden Wall More images
Barn Range at Westmill Bury Farm (100m north of the Bury)	Westmill Village, Westmill	Barn	early C20	19 October 1951	TL3709627172; 51°55′34″N 0°00′27″W	1174004	Upload Photo
Parish Church of St Mary the Virgin (church of England)	Westmill	Parish Church	Pre conquest	22 February 1967	TL3694427171; 51°55′34″N 0°00′35″W	1173980	Parish Church of St Mary the Virgin (church of England) More images
Westmill Bury	Westmill	House	c. 1710	22 February 1967	TL3709627069; 51°55′31″N 0°00′28″W	1347548	Upload Photo
Parish Church of St John the Baptist	Widford	Anglican Church	1887-8	24 January 1967	TL4132615795; 51°49′22″N 0°02′57″E	1101926	Parish Church of St John the Baptist More images
Wall forming West Boundary of Church Yard with Classical Gateway	Widford, East Hertfordshire	Gate	Mid 16th century	24 January 1967	TL4130115788; 51°49′22″N 0°02′56″E	1176928	Upload Photo
Corneybury	Wyddial, East Hertfordshire	Manor House	Late 16th century	19 October 1951	TL3581130706; 51°57′30″N 0°01′30″W	1101809	Upload Photo
Wyddial Hall	Wyddial	Country House	Early 16th century	19 October 1951	TL3740431850; 51°58′05″N 0°00′05″W	1307579	Wyddial Hall More images
