= Bailey Hall =

Bailey Hall may refer to:

- Bailey Hall, Hertford, Hertfordshire, England
- Bailey Hall (University of Kansas), listed on the National Register of Historic Places (NRHP)
- Bailey Hall (University of Minnesota)
- Bailey Hall (Ithaca, New York), a building on the campus of Cornell University, NRHP-listed
- Bailey Hall (Delta State University)
- Bailey Hall (Urbana College), Urbana, Ohio
