= List of works by Henry Payne =

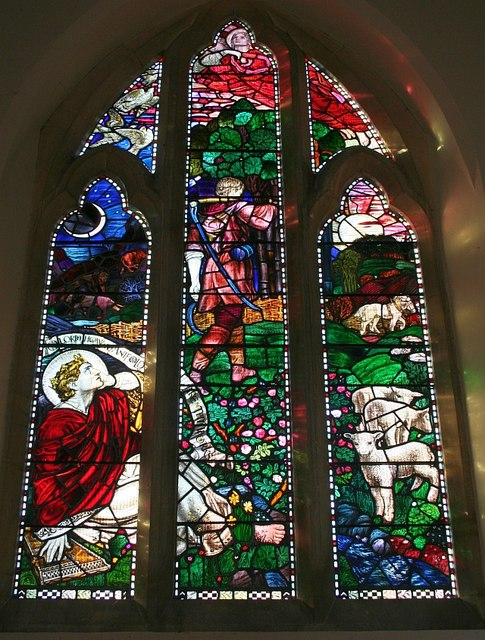
West Window, Hook Church: The "Good Shepherd" window by Henry Payne. A mix of a typical English country scene, with lambs and a stream, but with lions behind the wicker fence and a biblical king complete with what appears to be a zither.

List of works by Henry Payne Details of some of the major works of the stained glass artist Henry Payne.

Payne worked for a period as a student of Christopher Whall and in turn, when teaching at the Birmingham School of Art, included A.J. Davies, Florence Camm, and Margaret Agnes Rope amongst his pupils.

== Works ==
=== Birmingham Museums and Art Gallery ===
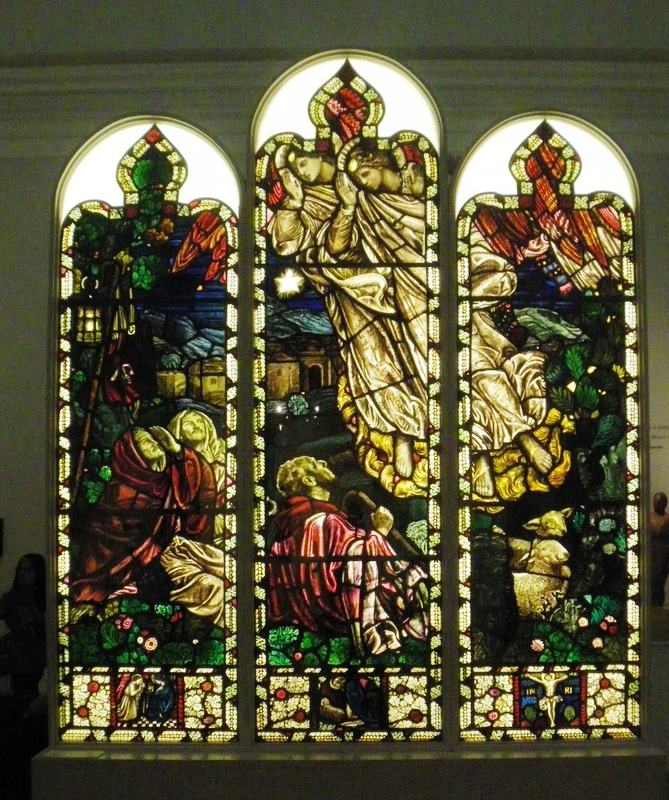
Payne window in Birmingham Museum and Art Gallery

The Birmingham Art Gallery Birmingham, Warwickshire have a Payne window which came from a Methodist chapel in Cradley Heath. It was executed in 1922 and served as a War Memorial for the men of the chapel's congregation who gave their lives in the First World War. The work was entitled "Peace and Goodwill". In Payne's composition angels appear to the shepherds to announce the Birth of Jesus. The title is part of the words "Glory to God in the highest, and on earth peace, good will toward men". There are three vignettes at the base of the window which depict the Annunciation, the Nativity and the Crucifixion. The window was designed and made by Payne at his studio in the Cotswolds.

The Birmingham Museum and Art Gallery has another window which shows Payne's prowess as a designer. It is called "Rumour" and dates to 1908. It was made by a pupil of Payne's under his supervision and was Payne's own design. The subject is "History" protected by a cloak of vigilance (the artist has used eyes to show this), threatened by deceipt and false witness. The telegraph poles in the background indicate the speed with which "rumour" can fly, and remind us that technology can be used for good and evil purposes. The subject reflected the concern at the time about the independence and responsibility of the mass media.

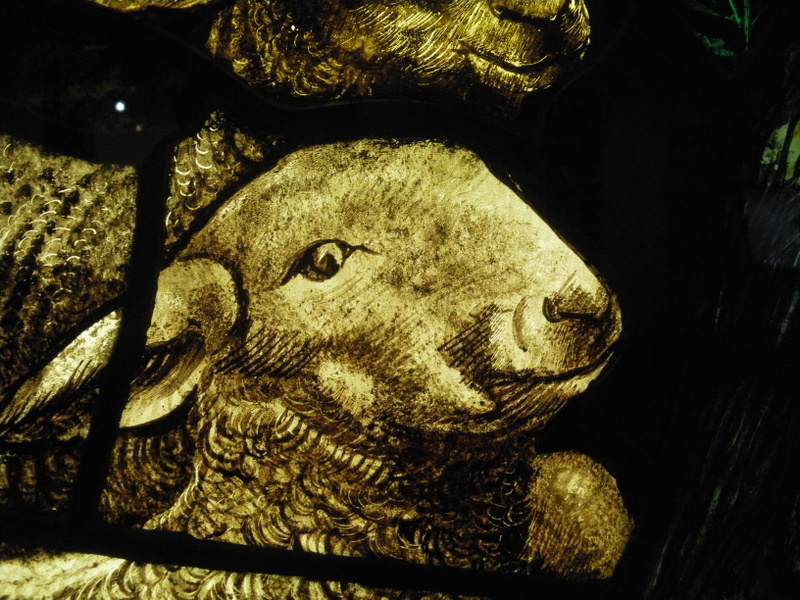
Sheep in Payne's Cradley Heath composition.

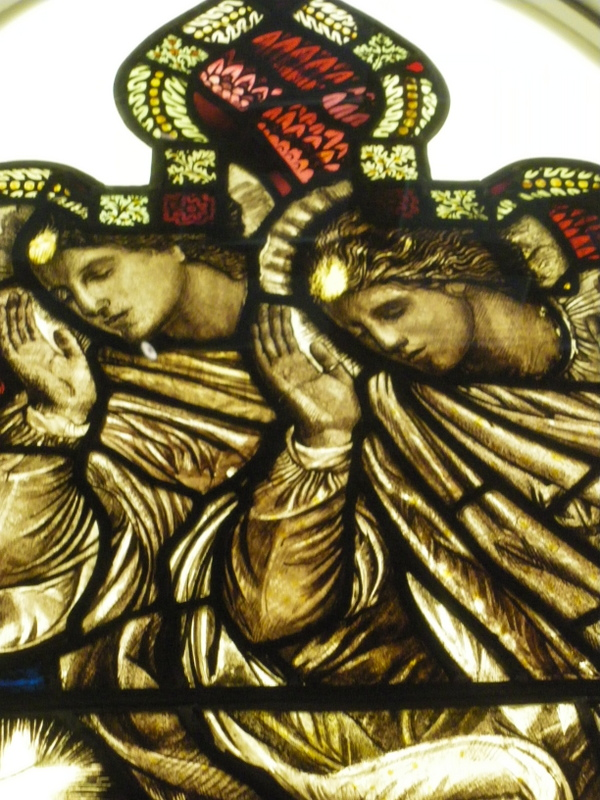
The angels make their announcement

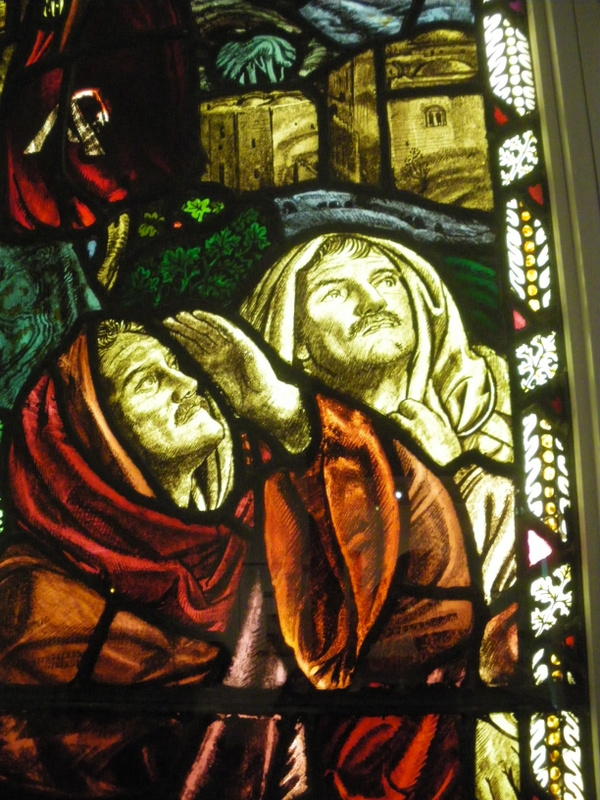
The shepherds listen in wonder.

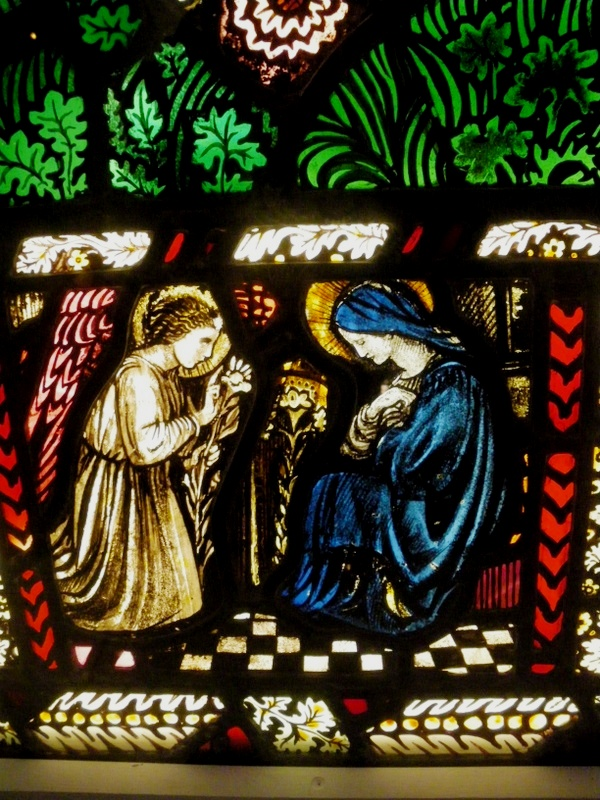
One of three vignettes at the base of the window. The Annunciation. Gabriel tells Mary the good news.

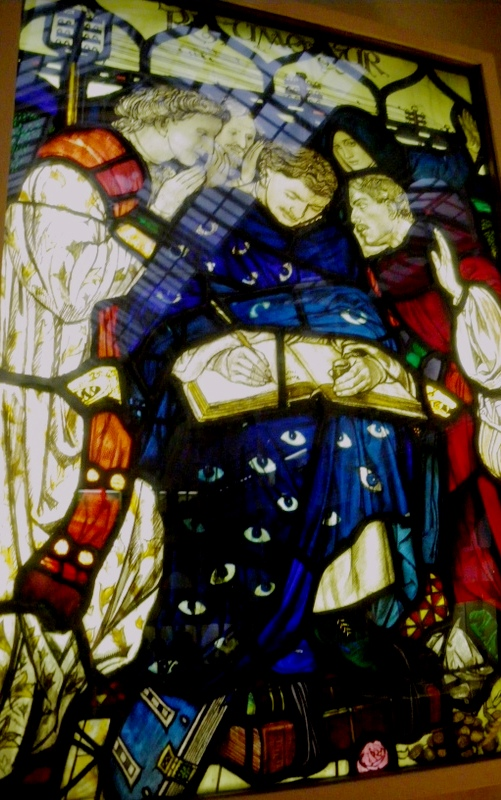
"Rumour"

=== St James ===
St James church in Chipping Campden, Gloucestershire featured in "England’s Thousand Best Churches" by Simon Jenkins. Payne completed the five-light East window in 1925 in memory of those who served in the Great War. 15th Century glass was used in the tracery.

The window is inscribed-

"IN MEMORY OF THOSE WHO FELL/ IN THANKFULNESS TO GOD FOR PEACE/ AND IN THANKFULNESS FOR THOSE/ WHO CAME BACK 1914-1918/ "AND US THEY TRUSTED; WE THE TASKS INHERIT; THE UNFINISHED TASK FOR WHICH THEIR LIVES WERE SPENT"

— Window inscription

In the first light we have depictions of St James, St George with sword and shield, St James leaving his boat to follow Jesus and the Fereby Arms. In light two we have angels who look towards Christ in the next light to their right, St Catherine with her wheel, Moses holding up his hands and a depiction of the parish church. In the third light Payne depicts Christ, the Madonna and Child, a shepherd with his flock and the Arms of Canterbury. The fourth light depicts more angels, again looking towards Christ on the left, St John the Baptist, Elijah with horses and the Chariot of Fire and the Arms of Grevel House. The fifth light depicts St Martin and the beggar at Amiens, St Michael the Archangel weighing the souls of men and the Arms of the See of Gloucester. The inclusion of St Martin reminds us that the Armistice had been signed on St Martin's Day.

=== List of works ===
The following list is a partial list of Payne's works.

Church	Location	Date(s)	Subject, notes and references
All Saints'	Hutton Rudby, Yorkshire	1932	Payne completed a three-light traceried window for All Saints' entitled "Fides, Caritas, Spes" (translates "Faith, Charity and Hope"). The window is inscribed "In memory of Margaret the Dearly loved wife of Sir John H Ropner. Bart.of Skutterskelfe.1932". The photograph shown in this article appears courtesy Dave Webster.
All Saints'	Malvern Wells, Worcestershire		This church designed by Arthur Troyte Griffith has stained glass by Payne.
All Saints'	Turkdean, Gloucestershire	1937	This church has a South-East window in the South Aisle by Henry Payne, who was assisted by his son Edward.
Church of the Good Shepherd	Hook Common, Worcestershire	1908	One three-light window in this church is entitled "The Good Shepherd" King David as the psalmist sits under a banner proclaiming- "Oh Lord how manifold are Thy Works", a quotation from Psalm 104 in the Biblical Old Testament, and looks out at various scenes; a labourer goes off to work carrying a scythe, sheep graze in another, lions roam under a moonlit sky and horses pull a plough. The window was given in memory of Captain Grice-Hutchinson who was Conservative M.P. for Aston Manor from 1891 to 1900. He died in 1906. The window in the North East Nave is by Edward Payne, Henry's son. It depicts the story of Ruth.
Church of St John the Evangelist	Elkstone, Gloucestershire	1929	The original stained glass in the tiny East window was replaced in 1929 with a Virgin and Child by Henry Payne
Corpus Christi College Chapel	Oxford, Oxfordshire	1931	Payne completed an East window for the college chapel.
Little Chapel	Rodborough, Gloucestershire	1936	Payne designed the window depicting the Nativity in the chapel's sanctuary area and his son Edward added "The Light of the World" in 1947 based on William Holman Hunt's painting.
Madresfield Court	Madresfield, Worcestershire		Over the years Madresfield Court has had many alterations and the biggest changes were made around 1865 by the architect Philip Hardwick (1792–1870). The seventh Earl was a patron of the Arts and Crafts movement and he engaged Charles Robert Ashbee to create the library which is rich in carvings by Alec Miller and Will Hart. Payne painted frescoes in the chapel using egg tempera on dry plaster and executed some stained glass windows as well as decorations on the gallery balustrades and organ case. Madresfield is well known for its associations with Evelyn Waugh and Waugh partly based the house in "Brideshead Revisited" on Madresfield and especially the chapel and most of his main characters were said to be drawn from members of the Lygon family.
Seynckley House	Minchinhampton, Gloucestershire		This large Grade II detached house was purchased by Henry Payne in 1908 and he engaged Sidney Barnsley to carry out some alterations to it. He designed and made one window for the house which was at one time known as St Loe's House
St Agatha's Church	Sparkbrook, Birmingham	1901	Payne was responsible for the East window in the church but it was destroyed by German bombing in the Second World War. Somewhat ironically the theme was the "Resurrection". Photograph of this window shown courtesy Aidan McRae Thomson .
St Agnes Church	Moseley, Birmingham	1909	The church dates back to 1883 and is built in the Decorated Gothic style whilst the furnishings are Perpendicular Gothic. In the West end of the North Aisle is a window by Payne with the theme "Suffer the little children".
St Andrew	Aylestone, Leicestershire	1930	Payne's East window entitled "Ascension" has beautiful colouring and various angels are depicted surrounding the Risen Lord. The church's website states "The magnificent East window, Christ in Ascension, was designed in 1930 by Henry Payne, of the Bromsgrove School of Artists. The overall style has a definite pre-Raphaelite flavour despite the late date. The visual impact of the window always leaves a lasting impression on visitors"
St Andrew's Church	Roker, Sunderland	1908	This church is known as one of the masterpieces of the Arts and Crafts "free" style in church architecture. It was built by Edward Schroeder Prior in 1904–7. Payne designed the two main windows in the church, the East window which depicts the Ascension and the South Transept window depicting the biblical text "Come unto me all ye that are heavy laden". In the lower lights of the South Transept window, Payne drew his figures in contemporary dress and in the upper lights a group of angels are shown carrying Christ's cross.
St Botolph	Carlton-in-Cleveland, Yorkshire		For this church Payne designed the three-light traceried East window and two memorial windows added after the First World War. The present church was completed in 1897 and designed by Temple Moore.
St Catherine	Sacombe Green, Hertfordshire		Payne's three-light traceried East window depicts the risen Christ with St Mary and St John on either side and two sleeping soldiers at Our Lords' feet.
St Cuthbert	Holme Lacy, Herefordshire		This is a redundant church and part of The Churches Conservation Trust. The church has a Henry Payne three-light traceried East window depicting the Archangel Michael weighing souls. The window is in memory of Sir Robert Lucas-Tooth, the 1st Baronet, who died in 1915. See St Cuthbert's Church, Holme Lacy.
St James	Goldenacre, Edinburgh	1921	This 14th century gothic church has stained glass by Douglas Strachan and a Henry Payne window in the North East Chancel.
St John the Baptist	Stokesay, Shropshire		Another church featured in Simon Jenkins England's Thousand Best Churches The two-light window depicts angels announcing Christ's Birth to the shepherds. At the bottom the window is inscribed "GLORY TO GOD IN THE HIGHEST AND ON EARTH PEACE GOODWILL TOWARD MEN" — Window inscription
St John the Evangelist	Elkstone, Gloucestershire	1929	Payne completed a small single light East window in the Apse area depicting Mary and The Christ Child.
St Martin's Church	Kensal Rise, Inner London		Payne produced several windows for this church
St Thomas à Becket,	Huntington, Herefordshire near Kington, Herefordshire		A chancel window "To the memory of all good mothers", a South window "Suffer Little Children" and a north window "St Francis of Assisi"
St John the Evangelist	West Ashton, Wiltshire	1920	The east window in this church near Trowbridge serves as a War Memorial.
