= Cromer Windmill =

Cromer Windmill may refer to a number of windmills:-

In Hertfordshire

- Cromer Windmill, Ardeley

In Norfolk

- Any of three windmills at Cromer
