= Henry Chauncy =

British lawyer, topographer, and antiquarian (1632–1719)

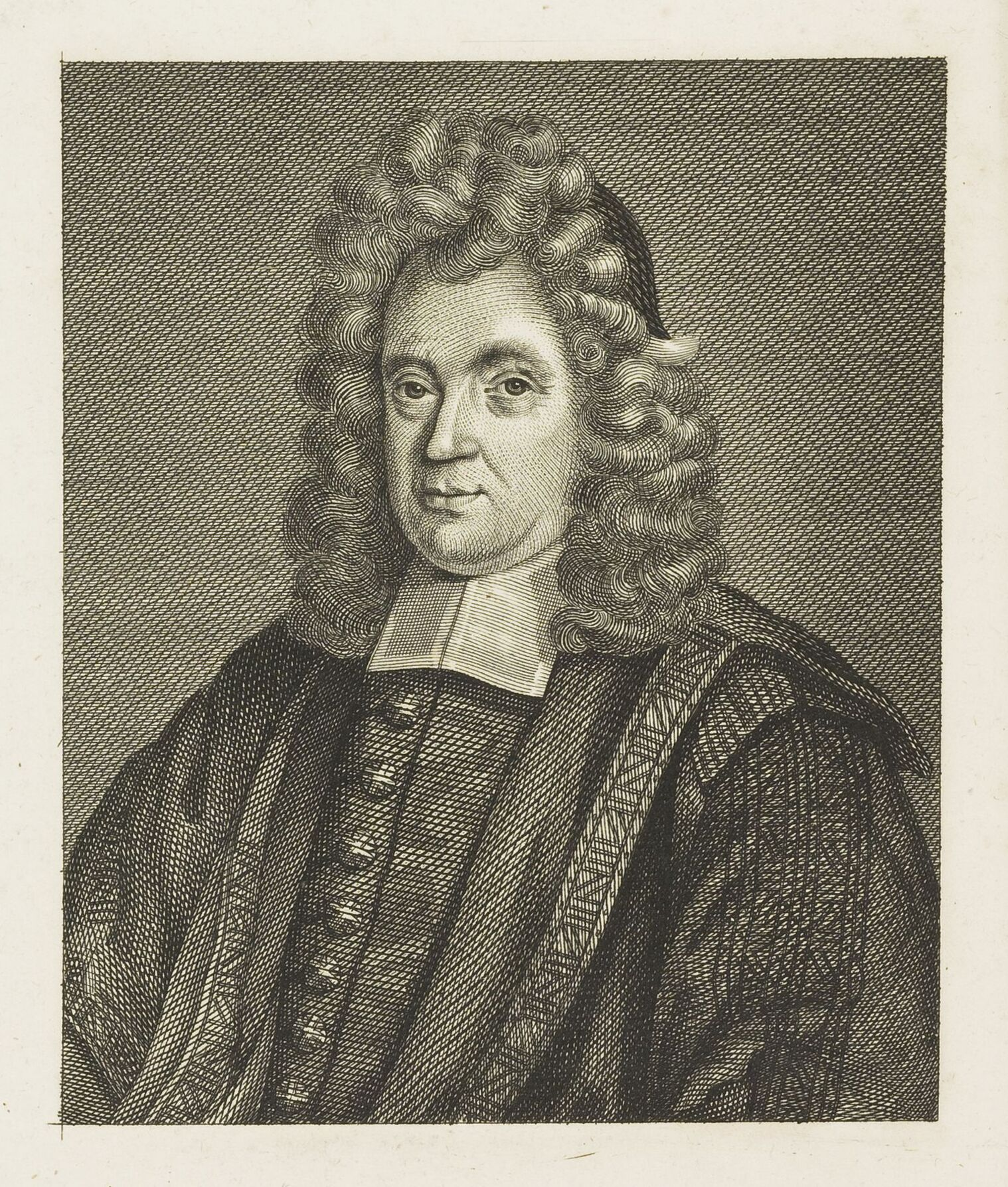
Henry Chauncy

Sir Henry Chauncy (12 April 1632 – April 1719) was an English lawyer, topographer and antiquarian. He is best known for his county history of Hertfordshire, published in 1700.

== Life ==
He was born in Ardeley (then known as Yardley), Hertfordshire, son of Henry Chauncy and Anne Parke, daughter of Peter Parke of Tottenham. The manor of Ardeley had belonged to St Paul's Cathedral since before the Norman Conquest. Chauncy stated that the manor house (Ardeley Bury) and demesne had been held for above 200 years by his ancestors, who had had several leases for lives from the Dean and Chapter of St Paul's. Charles Chauncy (1592–1672), President of Harvard College, was his great-uncle.

He attended Stevenage Grammar School, then spent a year at Bishop's Stortford Grammar School before going to Gonville and Caius College, Cambridge followed by the Middle Temple.

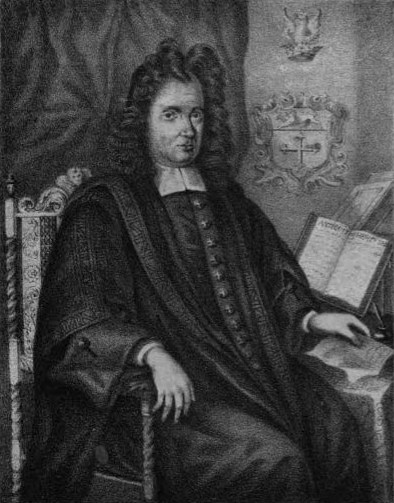
Henry Chauncy

Although his main residence was Ardeley Bury, the manor house which he inherited at his father's death in 1681, he also lived at Lombard House, Hertford. He held various offices in Hertford, serving as steward of the borough court and recorder.

In 1712, the year he turned 80, Chauncy was involved in one of England's last witch-hunts. The alleged witch, Jane Wenham, lived at Walkern, near Ardeley. Initially, Wenham approached Chauncy as the local justice for help with a claim against a farmer who had called her a witch. Chauncy asked the rector of Walkern to arbitrate, but when complaints about Wenham continued he issued a warrant for her arrest and gave instructions that she be searched for "witch marks". Although no such marks were found, it was decided that there was sufficient evidence for Wenham to be tried at the assize court in Hertford. The judge was profoundly sceptical: when told that she had been seen flying, he said that there is no law against flying. The verdict was guilty, but the judge obtained a reprieve, and later persuaded the Crown to grant Wenham a royal pardon.

Chauncy died in 1719 and is buried in the chancel of St Lawrence Ardeley with other generations of his family. There is a plaque on the wall of the church to commemorate his life.

== Works ==
In about 1680 he began work on his county history, The Historical Antiquities of Hertfordshire. It took him 14 years to write. By 1695 he was seeking 500 subscribers to pay for the costs of printing, and the volume was finally published in 1700. In writing the work Chauncy paid a team of researchers to gather historical anecdotes and determine genealogical lines for him. It was dedicated to its principal sponsor, the third Earl of Bridgewater; and was illustrated by forty-six engravings (thirty-three of them by Jan Drapentier), most of which were bird's-eye views of the seats of the major subscribers.

== Family ==
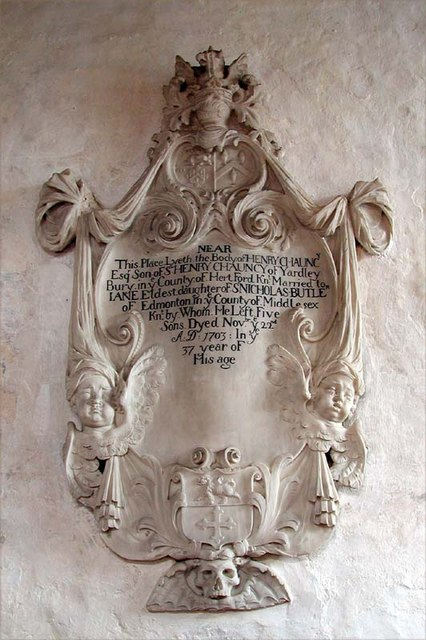
Monument in Ardeley Church to Chauncy's son, also called Henry

Chauncy had three wives: Jane Flyer (m. 1657), daughter of Francis Flyer, High Sheriff of Hertfordshire, by whom he had three sons and four daughters before her death in 1672; Elizabeth Gouldsmith (née Wood) (m. 1674), a widow, who died in 1677; and Elizabeth Thurston (m. 1679), daughter of Nathaniel Thurston of Suffolk, by whom he had a son and daughter, and who died in 1706.

In 1692, his eldest surviving son, Henry, married Jane Boteler, a marriage of which Sir Henry strongly disapproved: this brought him into a protracted legal dispute with Jane's father, Sir Nicholas Boteler, and a permanent estrangement from his son, who died in 1703. In the family pedigree published in the Antiquities he did not record the marriage, although in the preface he speaks darkly of degenerate relatives and their malicious accomplices. The bulk of his estate passed to his grandson Henry, who died in 1722 without issue.
