= Jan Drapentier =

Dutch engraver (fl. 1674–1713)

Jan Drapentier (fl. 1674–1713), was an engraver.

Drapentier was the son of D. Drapentier or Drappentier, a native of Dordrecht, who engraved some medals commemorative of the great events connected with the reign of William III and Mary II, and also a print with the arms of the governors of Dordrecht, published by Mathias Balen in his Beschryving van Dordrecht (1677). Jan Drapentier seems to have come to England and worked as an engraver of portraits and frontispieces for the booksellers. These, which are of no very great merit, include portraits of William Hooper (1674), Sir James Dyer (1675), Richard Baxter, the Earl of Athlone, Viscount Dundee, Henry Sacheverell, the seven bishops, and others.

He is probably the same Johannes Drapentier who by his wife, Dorothea Tucker, was father of a son Johannes, baptised at the Dutch Church, Austin Friars, on 7 October 1694. He was largely employed in engraving views of the country seats of the gentry, &c., in Hertfordshire for Henry Chauncy's Antiquities of Hertfordshire (published in 1700). Later in life he seems to have returned to Dordrecht, where a Jan Drapentier became engraver to the mint, and engraved several medals commemorative of the peace of Ryswick and other important events down to the treaty of Utrecht in 1713. He also engraved an allegorical broadside commemorating the latter event. An engraving of the House of Commons in 1690 is signed 'F. Drapentier sculpsit.'
