= William Tutty =

18th-century English missionary

Reverend William Tutty

Personal life
- Born: 1715 Hertfordshire, England
- Died: 24 November 1754 (aged 38–39) Hertford, England
- Spouse: Catherine Hollows

Religious life
- Religion: Christianity
- Denomination: Church of England

Reverend William Tutty (c. 1715 – 24 November 1754) was an English-Canadian clergyman. Ordained in the Church of England, he moved to Canada in 1749 as a missionary for Nova Scotia.

== Life ==
Tutty was educated at Emmanuel College, Cambridge, and ordained priest in 1748. He travelled to Nova Scotia with Governor Edward Cornwallis as a missionary on behalf of the Society for the Propagation of the Gospel, arriving in Halifax on June 21, 1749.

Reverend Tutty opened St. Paul's Church in Halifax on September 2, 1750, and was the first minister (1750–54).

He returned to England and worked, died and was buried at All Saints' Church, Hertford.

== Other reading ==
- Historical notices of the missions of the Church of England in the North American colonies previous to the independence of the United States: chiefly from the ms. documents of the Society for the Propagation of the Gospel in Foreign Parts
- Society for the Propagation of the Gospel in Foreign Parts - Nova Scotia
