= All Saints' Church, Hertford =

Coordinates: 51.7950°N 0.0757°W

- All Saints' with St John's, Hertford
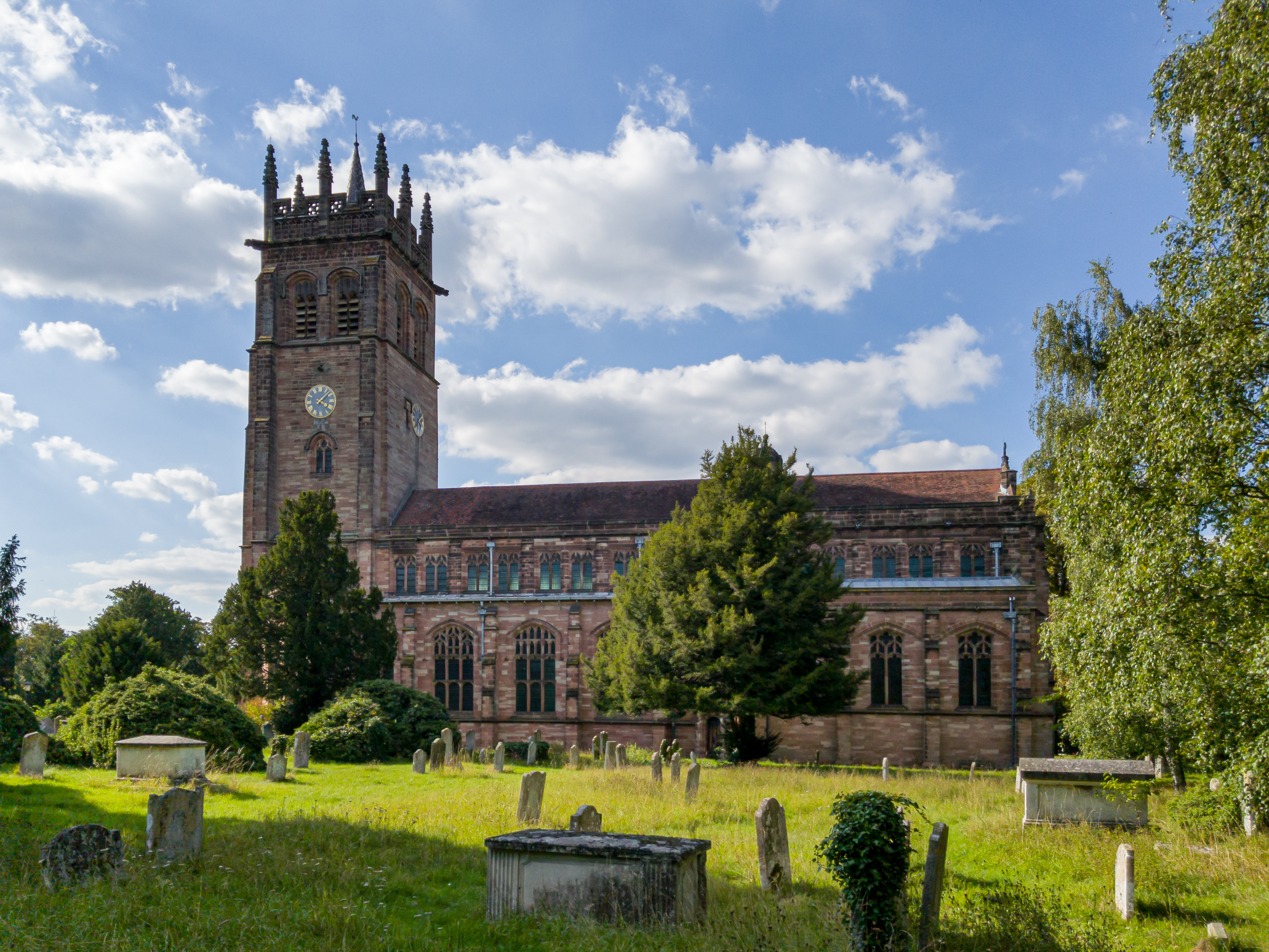
- All Saints' Church, Hertford, from the southwest

- Location in Hertfordshire
- OS grid reference: TL 328,125
- Location: Queens Road, Hertford, Hertfordshire
- Country: England
- Denomination: Anglican
- Website: All Saints, Hertford

History
- Former name(s): All Hallows, Hertford
- Status: Parish church
- Founded: ?700 AD
- Dedication: All Saints
- Consecrated: 20 February 1895

Architecture
- Functional status: Active
- Heritage designation: Grade II*
- Designated: 12 April 1973
- Architect(s): Paley, Austin and Paley; Austin and Paley
- Architectural type: Church
- Style: Gothic Revival (Perpendicular)
- Groundbreaking: 1893
- Completed: 1905

Specifications
- Capacity: 800
- Height: 140 feet (42.7 m)
- Materials: Runcorn sandstone

Administration
- Province: Canterbury
- Diocese: St Albans
- Archdeaconry: Hertford
- Deanery: Hertford and Ware
- Parish: All Saints with St. John, Hertford

Clergy
- Vicar: Reverend Simon Cutmore BA MAtr

All Saints' Church is in Queens Road, Hertford, Hertfordshire, England. It is an active Anglican parish church in the deanery of Hertford and Ware, the archdeaconry of Hertford, and the diocese of St Albans. It is the civic church of the town and of the county. The church is recorded in the National Heritage List for England as a designated Grade II* listed building. It is the largest church in Hertfordshire, other than St Albans Cathedral, and can seat up to 1,000 people.

== History ==
The parish dates back to before the 10th century, and a church was present on the site at the time of the Domesday Survey. This church was replaced during the 15th century by a church with a cruciform plan and a west tower. The parish of All Saints was merged with that of St John in the 17th century. On 22 December 1891 the church was destroyed by fire. A competition was held to design a new church, which was won by the Lancaster firm of architects, Paley, Austin and Paley. The foundation stone was laid on 25 March 1893 and the new church was consecrated by the Bishop of St Albans on 20 February 1895. The insurance for the old church paid only £2.800 (equivalent to £310,000 in 2025), toward the cost, and a further £12,500 (equivalent to £1,420,000 in 2025) was raised by public subscription. In 1904–05 the church was completed at the west end and by adding the tower. This was done by the Lancaster practice, now known as Austin and Paley, and cost £10,366 (equivalent to £1,090,000 in 2025). In 1934 the Memorial Chapel was completed to the memory of those who died in the First World War. New glass doors were added at the west end of the church in 2003.

== Architecture ==
=== Exterior ===
The church is constructed in red Runcorn sandstone, (Note: The architectural historian Nikolaus Pevsner remarked that the church, because it is built of Runcorn stone (from Cheshire), and designed by an architectural practice from Lancashire, "is completely alien" in Hertfordshire.) with lead and tiled roofs. Its architectural style is Gothic Revival (Perpendicular). The plan consists of a nave with a clerestory, north and south aisles, a northwest porch, a north transept, a chancel with a north vestry, a south chapel, and a west tower. The tower is in three stages, with a half-octagonal stair turret on the north side, and buttresses at the angles. It has a west door above which is a five-light window. In the middle stage are two-light windows and clock faces on all sides. The top stage contains two-light louvred bell openings, one on the north side, and two on the others. The parapet is castellated and traceried, with gargoyles at the corners, and crocketed pinnacles rising from the corners and the centre of each side. The summit of the stair turret is also castellated, and is surmounted by a spirelet. The aisles are divided into bays by buttresses, each bay containing a three-light window. The clerestory has two two-light flat-headed windows in each bay. At the northwest corner of the church is a two-storey hexagonal porch, with angle buttresses, and two-light windows. On each side of the church, at the junction of the nave and chancel, are octagonal turrets with castellated parapets and low domes. In the north transept is a five-light window, and the vestry has two- and three-light windows. The south chapel has three bays, two-light windows on the south side, and a four-light window on the east side. The east window of the chancel has seven lights. On the side walls of the chancel are panels carved with texts; on the north side the text is from Psalm 103, and on the south side it is from the Te Deum.

=== Interior ===
The tower is supported by large octagonal piers. The six-bay arcades are carried on octagonal columns. At the entrance to the south chapel is an oak screen inserted in 1961. Two steps lead up from the nave to the chancel. The alabaster reredos, presented to the church in 1914, contains a carved panel depicting the Last Supper and four saints. In the south wall of the chancel is a small piscina and a twin sedilia. The half-octagonal sandstone pulpit is attached to the pier between the nave and the chancel. The font is of polished fossil limestone, and consists of a carved octagonal bowl carried on a column. The stained glass in the east window, dated 1900, is by Kempe. The stained glass in the east window of the Memorial Chapel was designed by J .N. C. Bewsey, and depicts four martyrs. The glass on the north side of the church is by Shrigley and Hunt. The memorials include fragments of brasses surviving from the earlier church dating from the 15th century. The chapel contains a marble memorial to the 1st Battalion of the Hertfordshire Regiment, designed in 1921 by Reginald Blomfield. The three-manual organ dates from 1899 to 1900, and was made by Henry Willis & Sons. Additions were made to it by the same firm in 1910. It was rebuilt in 1971 by Cedric Arnold, Williamson & Hyatt following fire damage. It was rebuilt again with some additions in 2001 by the Village Workshop. There is a ring of ten bells, all cast in 1907 by Mears and Stainbank at the Whitechapel Bell Foundry.

== Organ ==
The organ was installed in 1898 by Henry Willis. The casework was installed, along with a new pedal stop, in 1913. The organ was hand-blown until 1923 when an electric blower was installed. The original specification, including 'prepared for' stops such as the Pedal Ophicleide (added 1971) and Great Clarion (added 2001) can be found in the National Pipe Organ Register at N14556. In 1971 the firm of Cedric Arnold, Williamson & Hyatt of Thaxted, overhauled the organ. A total of sixteen new stops were added, mostly in line with proposals Willis made, completing the choruses of Great and Swell, adding mutations to the Choir and enhancing the Pedal. The 1971 specification is stored at N13066 Between November 2000 and April 2001 the Village Workshop restored the organ. The work was in three parts: the complete overhaul of all the leatherwork (most dated from 1899); enhancements to the action and piston control systems; the addition of new stops: a Fanfare Trumpet, Great Clarion (as Willis intended) and 32' Reed (installed in October 2001). All the new pipe-work was specially made to match the Willis originals.

== External features ==
Among the memorials in the churchyard are five that have been designated as Grade II listed buildings. They are: a chest tomb in white Portland stone dated 1774, a chest tomb in stuccoed brick dating from the 18th century, two stone gravestones from the 18th century, a headstone in carved Portland stone dated 1711, and a group of six headstones dating from the late 18th and early 19th centuries.

=== Notable interments ===
- William Tutty

== See also ==
- Grade II* listed buildings in East Hertfordshire
- List of works by Paley, Austin and Paley
- List of ecclesiastical works by Austin and Paley (1895–1914)
