= Bailey Hall, Hertford =

Grade II* listed house in Hertford, Hertfordshire, England

Bayley Hall
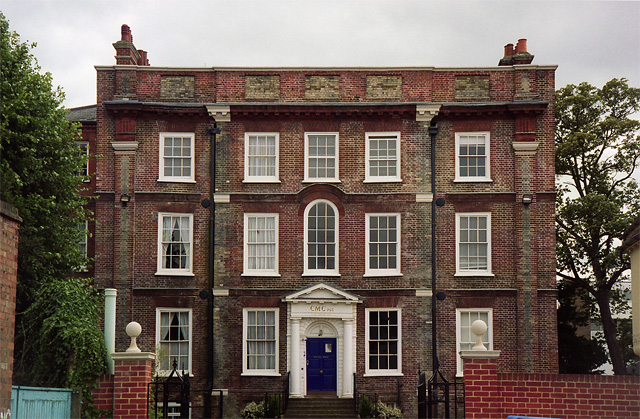
- The principal south elevation, showing the colossal Tuscan pilasters.

- Shown in Hertfordshire
- 51.79513°N 0.07737°W
- Location: Queens Road, Hertford

History
- Built: 1770

Site notes
- Architectural style: Queen Anne

Listed Building – Grade II*
- Official name: Bailey Hall
- Designated: 10 February 1950
- Reference no.: 268782

Bayley Hall (often spelt Bailey Hall) is a Grade II* listed building located on Queens Road in Hertford, Hertfordshire. Constructed primarily around 1770, it is regarded as one of the finest examples of early 18th-century domestic architecture in Hertford.

The building has undergone various changes, transitioning from a private manor to a school and municipal offices, before being converted into private offices in the late 20th century. It is also the subject of folklore regarding a network of secret tunnels.

== History ==
The site of Bayley Hall has been occupied since at least the early 17th century. A record from 1621 describes a "manor house" existing on this location. The present structure was commissioned around 1770, likely by a wealthy merchant or local official, though it incorporates structural elements and interior panelling from the preceding 17th-century house. In 1721, the property was recorded as the residence of Edward Blackmore, who had served as the Mayor of Hertford in 1713.

In 1900, the hall was acquired by the Hertford Grammar School (now the Richard Hale School). It initially served as the official residence for the Headmaster, but as the school expanded, the building was utilised for classrooms and administrative space. One of the school's most famous alumni, W. E. Johns (creator of the Biggles series), attended the school during this period. To accommodate the school's needs, a narrow three-storey extension was added to the eastern side of the building in the late 19th or early 20th century.

Following the school's relocation to its current site on Hale Road in 1930, Bayley Hall was repurposed as offices for the local council. During the mid-20th century, it served various community functions, including acting as a youth club and housing portions of the local education authority.

In recent years, the building and its surrounding grounds have been redeveloped. The main hall has been converted into offices, while the former stables and outbuildings were developed into a gated community known as Bayley Hall Mews.

== Architecture ==
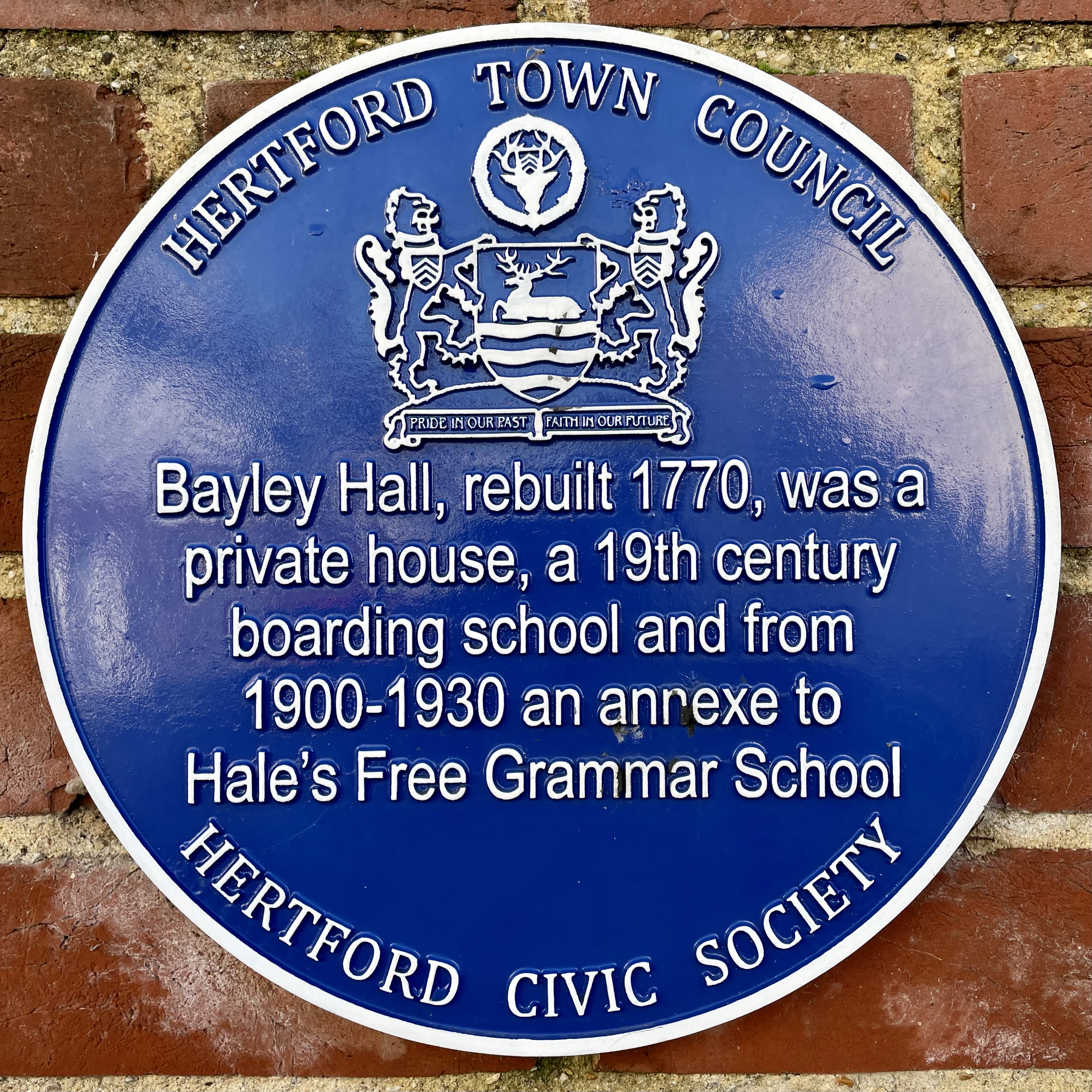
Bayley Hall, Hertford blue plaque

Bayley Hall is constructed of red brick laid in Flemish bond, featuring grey brick quoins and pilasters. The building consists of three storeys with an additional basement and attic level. The principal south elevation is five bays wide, subdivided in a 1:3:1 ratio by "colossal" red brick Tuscan pilasters with moulded Portland stone bases. The windows are largely 18-pane and 12-pane sashes with rubbed brick arches. The central doorway features a segmental pediment supported by fluted Corinthian pilasters. The roof is largely concealed from the street by a tall parapet with recessed panels and stone copings.

The interior is noted for its high level of preservation of 18th-century features. The entrance hall is divided by three-quarter wood Corinthian columns supporting an entablature decorated with Greek key ornament. The most significant internal feature is the main open-well staircase. It is constructed of hardwood with an open string, featuring carved tread brackets and "iron twist on vase" balusters. The dado rail accompanying the stairs is finished with veneered panelling and intricate marquetry motifs. Several rooms on the first and second floors retain original bolection-moulded panelling and 18th-century marble fireplaces.

== Castle Tunnel and Knights Templar ==
Bayley Hall is the subject of persistent local legends regarding secret tunnels. The official Historic England listing acknowledges the repute of a blocked tunnel leading from the basement of the hall to Hertford Castle, which sits approximately 150 yards to the north-west.

In 2004, the hall became gained media attention following claims that it was part of a "secret network" of tunnels used by descendants of the Knights Templar. While these claims have lack of supportive evidence, the physical existence of a passage toward the castle remains a popular topic of local historical debate.

== See also ==
- Grade II* listed buildings in East Hertfordshire
- Hertford Castle
- Richard Hale School
