= Greek key =

Greek key may refer to:

- Greek key (art), a decorative border constructed from a continuous line, shaped into a repeated motif
- Greek key (protein structure), a repeated motif in the secondary structure in proteins

== See also ==
- Greek keyboard (;ςΕΡΤΥ)
- Greek keyhole limpet
