= Gilston Park =

Country house in Gilston, Hertfordshire, England

Coordinates: 51°47′47″N 0°05′18″E

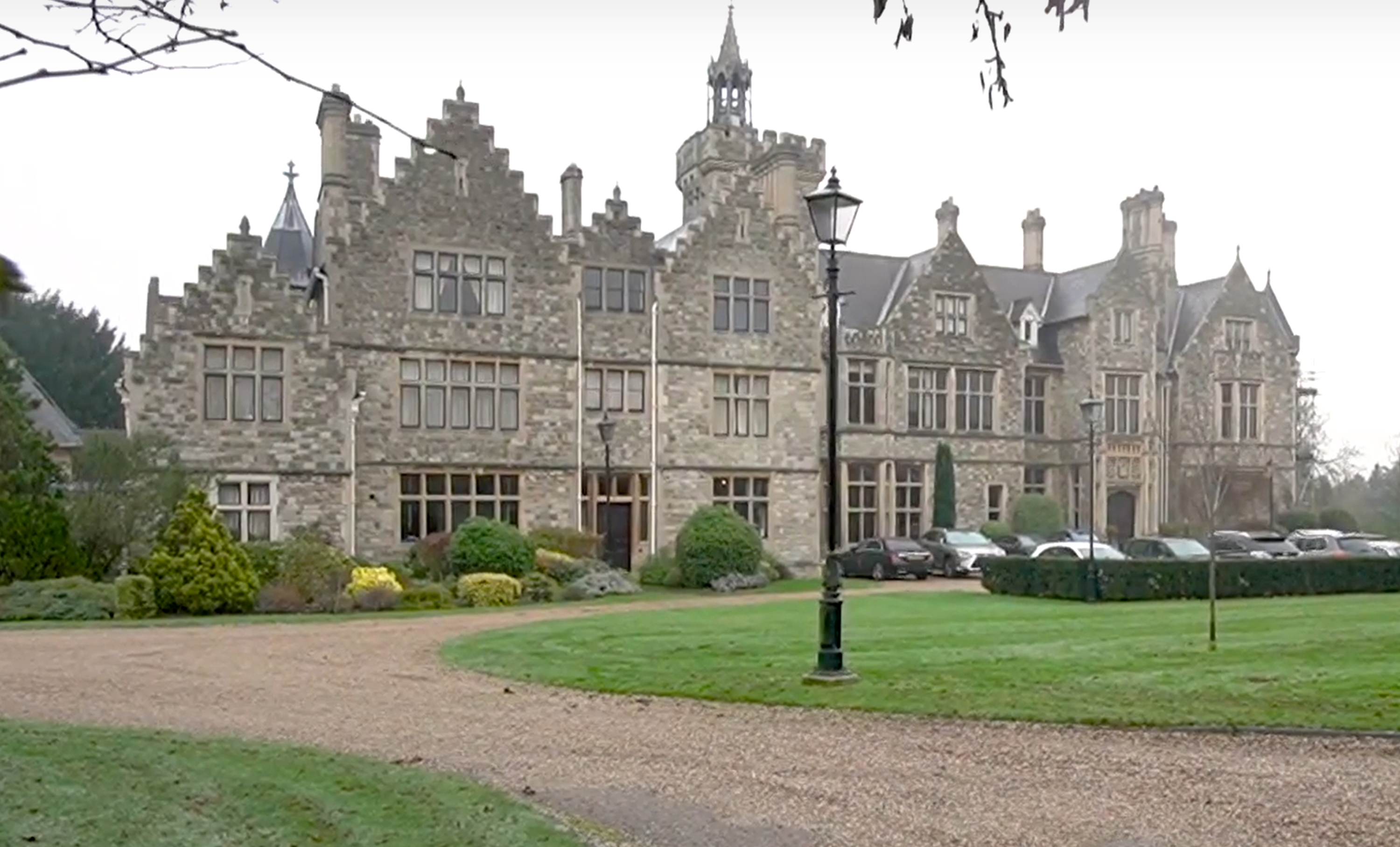
Gilston Park House

Gilston Park is a Grade II* listed country house in Gilston, Hertfordshire, England. It was designed by Philip Hardwick for John Hodgson around 1852.

== Owners and residents ==
John Hodgson (1805-1882) built Gilston Park House in about 1852. He bought the property on which a very old house stood and demolished it leaving only the porch which is still present today. John was a very wealthy land owner who held numerous properties in various counties as well as a house in Hyde Park, London. He also owned a large amount of land in Eastwick. In today's terms his estate was estimated to be worth about 100 million pounds.

John was born in 1805 in Wanstead. His father Thomas Hodgson (1759-1841) was also a landowner and left him several properties in his will. However John subsequently added substantially to his own wealth. He was a magistrate and at one time the High Sheriff of Hertfordshire. John did not marry and had no children. His older brother William Hodgson (1803-1886) who was a barrister was also a bachelor. He retired early and came to live at Gilston Park. Both brothers undertook a huge rebuilding of their estate including Eastwick. The rebuild included farms, domestic accommodation, schools and almshouses. It has been described as “a model Victorian estate” John died in 1882 and William inherited the house. When he died in 1886 it was inherited by his nephew Edward Salvin Bowlby.

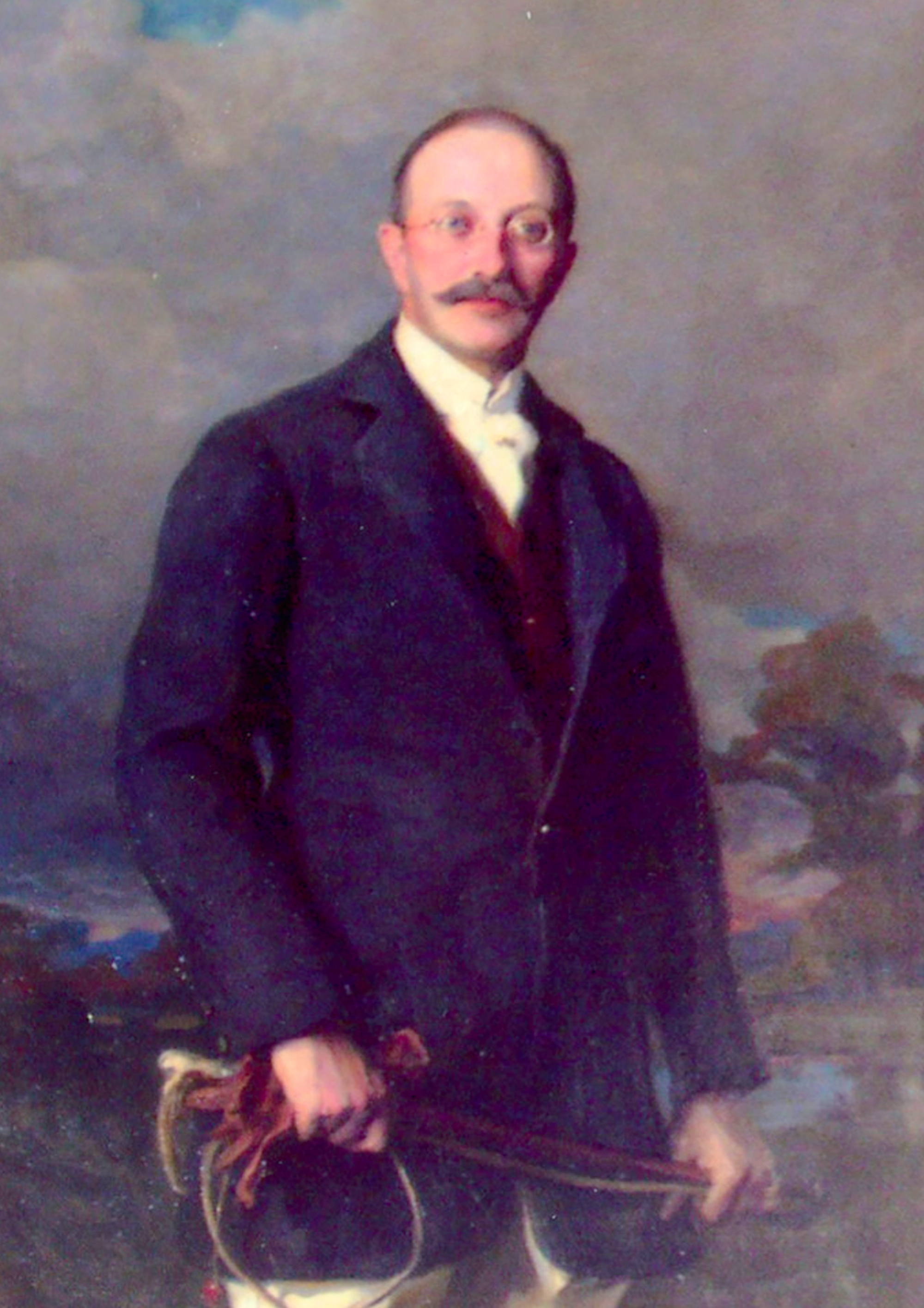
Arthur Salvin Bowlby

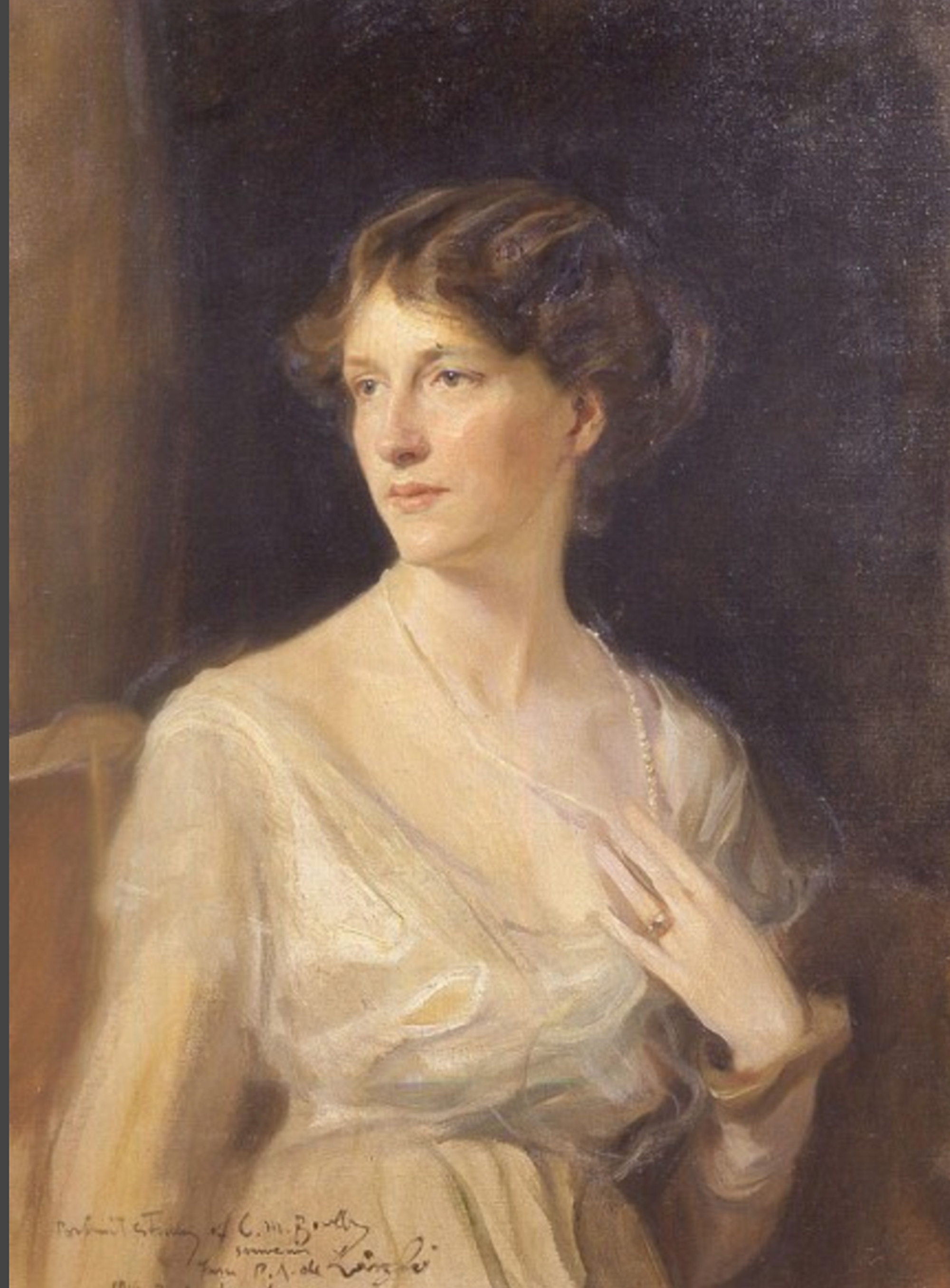
Catherine Bowlby, wife of Arthur Salvin Bowlby

Edward Salvin Bowlby (1830-1902) was also a barrister. He was married twice. His first wife was Maria Rimington who died in 1879. His second wife was Elizabeth Vans Agnew daughter of Robert Vans Agnew of Barnbarroch Hall. His eldest son by his first marriage was Arthur Salvin Bowlby and it was he who inherited the house when Edward died in 1902.

Arthur Salvin Bowlby (1872-1932) continued running the property as a farming estate. In 1903 he married Catherine Mary Bond who was the daughter of Edwin Edmund Bruton Bond who was a Lieutenant in the military. Arthur was a personal friend of the famous painter Philip de László who frequently stayed at Gilston Park. Between 1914 and 1923 De Laszlo painted eight portraits of the Bowlby family. Two of them – Arthur and his wife Catherine are shown. Arthur died in 1932 and his son Francis Edward Salvin Bowlby became the owner.

Francis Edward Salvin Bowlby (1904-1983) and his wife Lady Joan Catherine Bowlby (nee Trotter) lived at Gilston Park until he sold it in 1947. The house became a Country Club. In the early 1950s it was the set for several movies. Stills of the films showing the house can be seen at these references.
