= Urbana College Historic Buildings =

- U.S. National Register of Historic Places
- U.S. Historic district
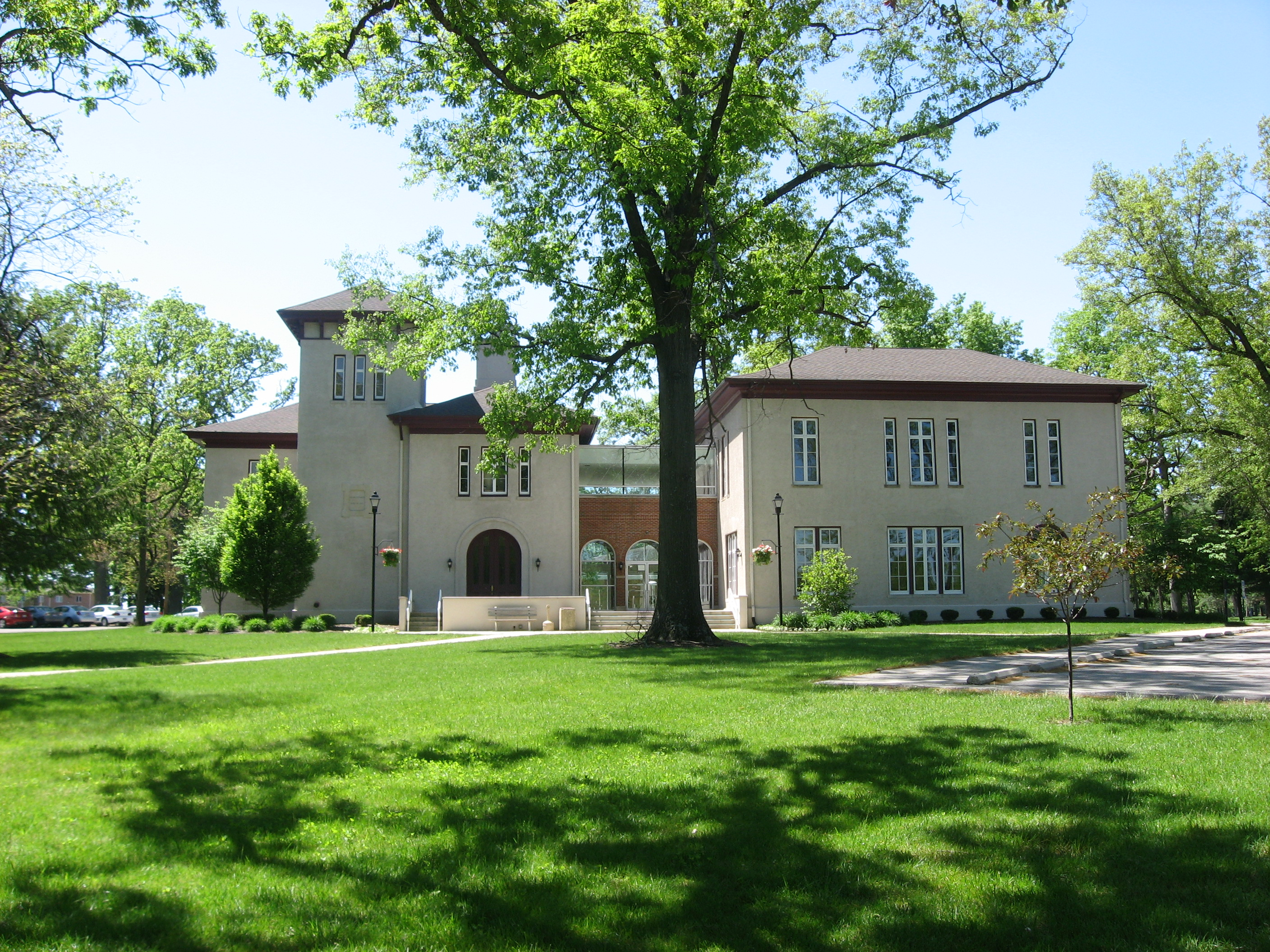
- Bailey (left) and Barclay (right) Halls

- Location within Ohio Location within the United States
- Location: College Way, Urbana, Ohio
- Coordinates: 40°6′8.4″N 83°45′43.2″W
- Area: 11 acres (4.5 ha)
- Built: 1856
- Architect: W. Russel West
- Architectural style: Italian Villa, Greek Revival
- NRHP reference No.: 80002952
- Added to NRHP: October 3, 1980

The Urbana College Historic Buildings are a historic district on the campus of Urbana University in Urbana, Ohio, United States. Composed of three nineteenth-century buildings, the district includes the oldest structures on the university's campus.

== University history ==
In 1849, members of the Church of the New Jerusalem in Urbana proposed the establishment of an institution of higher education in their city. Local individuals soon donated land and money for the construction of buildings, and the Ohio General Assembly issued a charter on March 7, 1850. The cornerstone for the college's first building was laid in June 1851; it was finished in 1853, and the first classes were soon assembled.

== Historic buildings ==
=== Bailey Hall ===
Upon its completion in 1853, the college's original building was named "Bailey Hall" in honor of Francis Bailey, the first American publicly to espouse the teachings of Emanuel Swedenborg. Built of brick, Bailey is an Italianate structure that rests on a stone foundation and is topped with a hip roof. Among its most prominent architectural features are a tower, massive arched double doors, and many casement windows. At the time of construction, Bailey Hall included a central hall, classrooms, and a library; it was expanded in 1875 with the addition of a chemistry laboratory and offices for the university president. Its appearance changed in 1915 with the addition of a new roof and the placement of stucco over the original bricks.

=== Oak Hall ===
Soon after the completion of Bailey Hall, a dormitory became necessary, and "College Hall" was built to house the students. The expenses of constructing this building — later called "Oak Hall" — were largely paid by J. Young Scammon, a member of the university's board of trustees and a wealthy Chicago businessman. Finished in 1856, Oak Hall was expanded with the addition of a third story in 1874, and it was refurbished with a new floor and roof in 1915. In order to restore the building to its original condition, major repairs were conducted in the spring of 1974, along with the removal of historically insensitive additions and the construction of a new entrance in the style of the original structure.

Based on a stone foundation, Oak Hall is a square brick structure built in the Greek Revival style of architecture. Four bays on each side, Oak is distinguished by architectural features such as corbelling on each bay, prominent capitals on the pilasters, and a large dormer window in the hip roof. The building has been modified by the addition of a small two-story wing with a massive chimney around the beginning of the twentieth century.

=== Barclay Hall ===
In 1883, continued expansion necessitated the erection of a second classroom building. Named "Barclay Hall," this structure included space for a lecture hall, a museum, and scientific classrooms. Because Barclay was placed just 30 feet (9.1 m) away from Bailey, the two buildings were soon connected by an arcade of brick that soon became a campus landmark. Although the building was heavily damaged by a 1920, it was soon restored to its pre-fire state. Like the other two structures, Barclay is a squarish building with three bays per side, and it is covered with a hip roof. Among its most distinctive features are its many multi-part windows; although narrow, they are larger than those of Bailey, and they are typically arranged in groups of two or three.

== Historic recognition ==
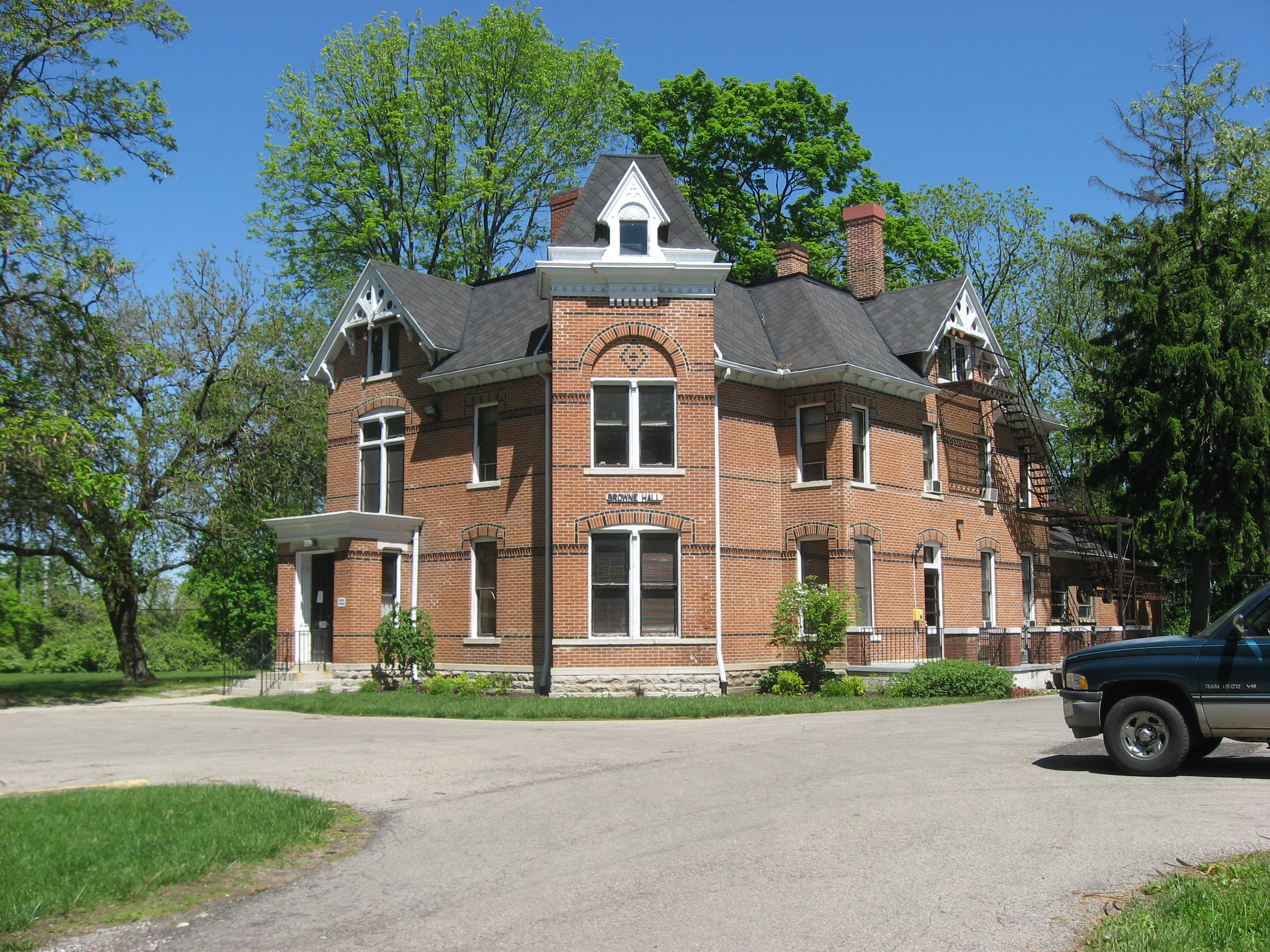
Browne Hall

In 1980, the Urbana College Historic Buildings were listed on the National Register of Historic Places. Their designation as a historic district was due primarily to their place in local history: Urbana University was one of a large number of religious colleges founded in Ohio during the middle of the nineteenth century. As the oldest buildings on the campus, Bailey, Oak, and Barclay Halls are important as typical buildings of the many nineteenth-century religious colleges. Another building on campus, Browne Hall, is of similar age; however, it was not included in the historic district because of its location, as it sits on the northeastern edge of the campus.
