= Cromer, Hertfordshire =

Hamlet in Hertfordshire, England

Coordinates: 51°56′16″N 00°06′54″W

Cromer is a hamlet in the civil parish of Ardeley, Hertfordshire, England.

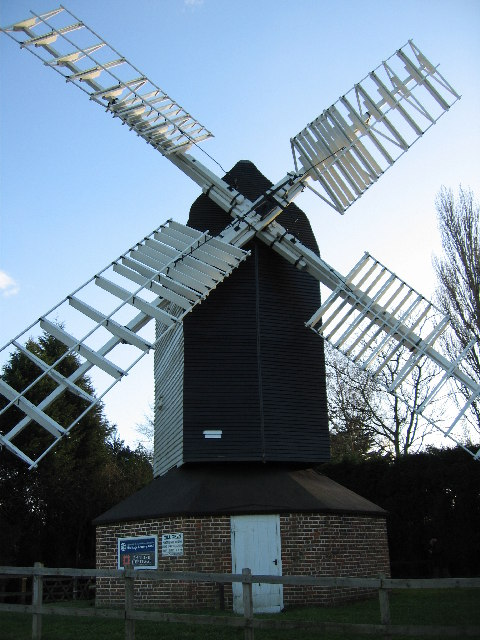
Cromer Windmil

It is a small hamlet; however, it is noteworthy for possessing Hertfordshire's sole surviving post mill. The current mill dates from 1681 on a site where a windmill has stood for over 600 years. The mill has been damaged several times, but was brought back into full working order in 1998 after receiving grants of over £50,000 from the Heritage Lottery Fund and English Heritage. The mill first opened to the public in 1991, and has continued to do so ever since.
