= Buntingford Almshouses =

Coordinates: 51.9457°N 0.0168°W

Buntingford almshouses
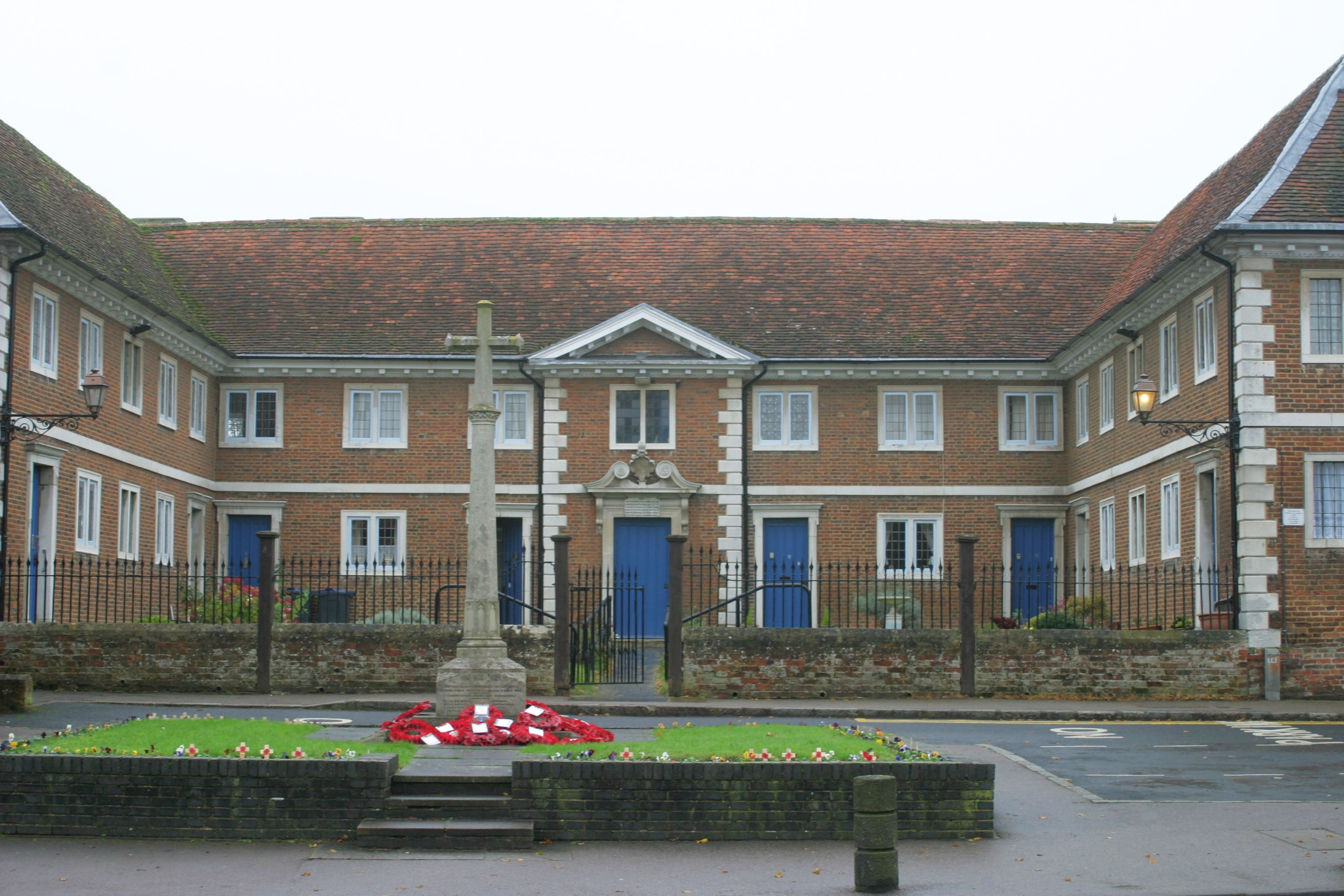
- Buntingford Almshouses, with war memorial in the foreground

Geography
- Location: Buntingford, Hertfordshire, England, United Kingdom

Services
- Emergency department: No Accident & Emergency

History
- Founded: 1684

Links
- Lists: Hospitals in England

Buntingford Almshouses is a Grade II* listed building on the high street of the Hertfordshire town of Buntingford. The building was erected in 1684 by the mathematician and astronomer Bishop Seth Ward who was born in the town. The architect was probably the scientist and architect, Robert Hooke.

The building, located next to St Peter's Church, is built of brick around three sides of a courtyard. The heritage listing describes the building as "[a] classical almshouses of 1684 of outstanding interest."

Having previously been used as the local hospital, the building is now run by a charity to provide accommodation for elderly people in the town.
