= Ardeley =

Village in Hertfordshire, England

Coordinates: 51°55′40″N 0°05′50″W

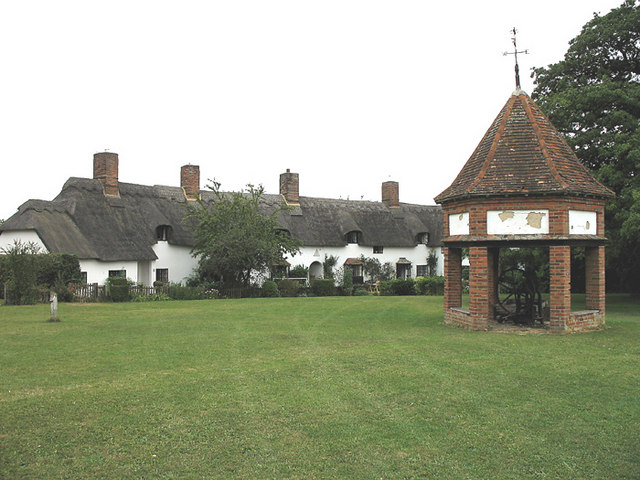
- The Village Green

- Location within Hertfordshire
- Population: 411 (Parish, 2021)
- Civil parish: Ardeley
- District: East Hertfordshire
- Shire county: Hertfordshire
- Region: East
- Country: England
- Sovereign state: United Kingdom
- Post town: Stevenage
- Postcode district: SG2
- Police: Hertfordshire
- Fire: Hertfordshire
- Ambulance: East of England
- UK Parliament: North East Hertfordshire

Ardeley is a village and civil parish in the East Hertfordshire district of Hertfordshire, England. It lies 5 miles (8 km) east of Stevenage, its post town. As well as the village itself, the parish includes the hamlets of Cromer, Wood End, and Moor Green. At the 2021 census the parish had a population of 411.

== Description ==
Ardeley village has a number of thatched cottages beside the green, a thatched village hall, a vicarage built in the 18th century and a CSA farm (Church Farm). It also has a children's play area near the school, at the end of school lane, five housing association/ex-council houses in "The Crescent", opposite the school and a number of church-let cottages. The international cleaning company, Hughes Gardner, are now based in the manor house. Other buildings of interest include

- Church of Saint Lawrence (Church of England)

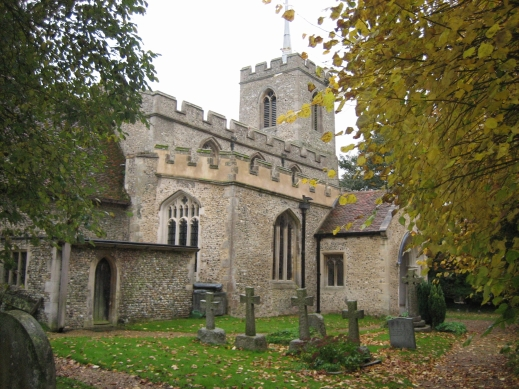
St Lawrence Church

The Grade I listed church dates from around the 13th century.

- Pub

The Grade II listed pub "The Jolly Waggoner"

- School

The primary school, Ardeley St. Lawrence JMI, founded in 1835, is a Church of England state funded school.

- Cromer Windmill

Hertfordshire's only surviving post mill is in the parish, about a mile to the north of the village centre.

== Events ==
Ardeley has an annual fete from which profits go to the parish.

== People ==
The Chauncy family lived at Ardeley Bury, the manor house of the village.

- Charles Chauncy, second president of Harvard College, was baptised in Ardeley on 5 November 1592.
- Sir Henry Chauncy was born in Ardeley in 1632. He wrote Antiquities of Hertfordshire which was published in 1700.
