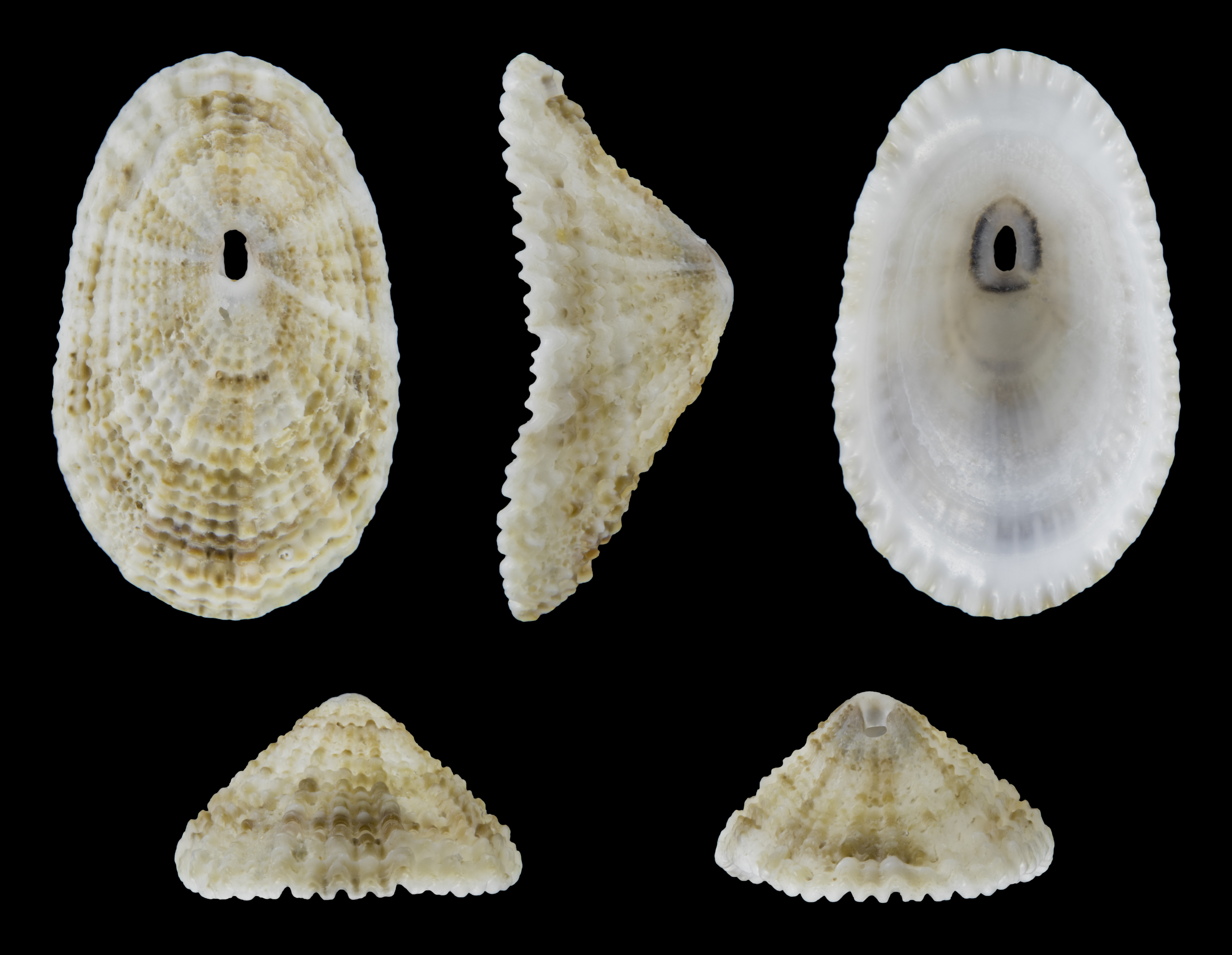

Scientific classification
- Kingdom: Animalia
- Phylum: Mollusca
- Class: Gastropoda
- Subclass: Vetigastropoda
- Order: Lepetellida
- Family: Fissurellidae
- Genus: Diodora
- Species: D. graeca

Binomial name
- Diodora graeca (Linnaeus, 1758)

= Diodora graeca =

Species of gastropod

Diodora graeca, the Greek keyhole limpet, is a sea snail or limpet, a marine gastropod mollusk in the family Fissurellidae, the keyhole limpets.

It was originally described by Carl Linnaeus in his landmark 1758 10th edition of Systema Naturae as Patella graeca (basionym).

== Distribution ==
This keyhole limpet can be found beneath stones and clinging to rocks in the sublittoral zone (up to a depth of a few hundred meters) in the Mediterranean and West Africa to the North Sea (widespread on the coasts of Ireland and western Britain) and the subarctic North Atlantic. The specimens washed up on the beaches of the North Sea are almost certainly fossils (from the Pliocene and the Eemian), as this species no longer occurs in the south-eastern part of the North Sea.

== Description ==
The oval shell is small (25 mm long and 18 mm wide) and rather flat. It has no whorls and is shield-shaped. The base of the shell is somewhat bent. Its aperture is situated at the dorsum and is keyhole-shaped. This hole serves as an outlet for water and waste products. The shell has a slight reticulated sculpture with concentric cords crossed by radial ridges and with the alternate ridges larger. The color of the shell varies from creamy white to yellow white and is often slightly orange tinted.

This species is mainly herbivorous and also feeds on detritus. The animal has a broad creeping foot and a developed mantle. Its carotenoid content has been investigated and the following substances have been found : α-, β, γ-carotene, zeaxanthin, diatoxanthin, mutatoxanthin and astaxanthin.

== Synonyms ==
- Fissurella mamillata Risso, 1826
- Fissurella reticulata (Da Costa, 1778)
- Patella apertura Montagu, 1803
- Patella graeca Linnaeus, 1758
- Patella reticulata Donovan, 1803

== Sources ==
- Oliver APH, The Hamlyn Guide to Shells of the World, Hamlyn Publishing Group, 1975, ISBN 0-600-56577-7
- Rolán, E., 2005. Malacological Fauna From The Cape Verde Archipelago. Part 1, Polyplacophora and Gastropoda.
- Muller, Y. (2004). Faune et flore du littoral du Nord, du Pas-de-Calais et de la Belgique: inventaire. [Coastal fauna and flora of the Nord, Pas-de-Calais and Belgium: inventory]. Commission Régionale de Biologie Région Nord Pas-de-Calais: France. 307 pp.
- Backeljau, T. (1986). Lijst van de recente mariene mollusken van België [List of the recent marine molluscs of Belgium]. Koninklijk Belgisch Instituut voor Natuurwetenschappen: Brussels, Belgium. 106 pp.
