= Sacombe Green =

Hamlet in Hertfordshire, England

Coordinates: 51.8592°N 0.0526°W

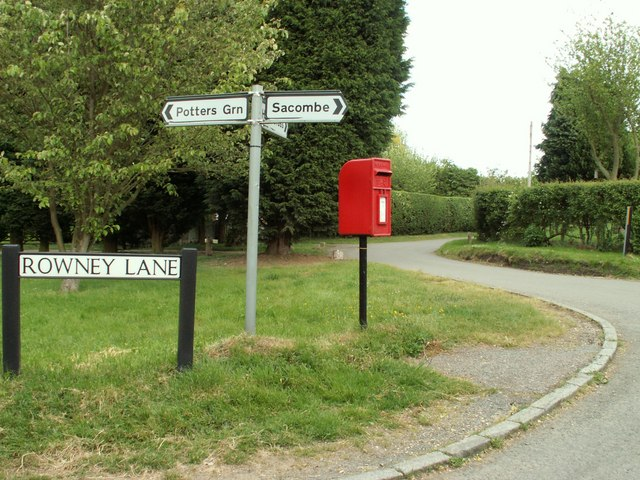

- Location within Hertfordshire
- Civil parish: Sacombe
- District: East Hertfordshire
- Shire county: Hertfordshire
- Region: East
- Country: England
- Sovereign state: United Kingdom
- Police: Hertfordshire
- Fire: Hertfordshire
- Ambulance: East of England

Sacombe Green is a hamlet located to the east of the village of Sacombe, in the civil parish of Sacombe, in the East Hertfordshire district, in the county of Hertfordshire, England.
