= Cromer Windmill, Ardeley =

Windmill in Hertfordshire, England

Ardeley Windmill
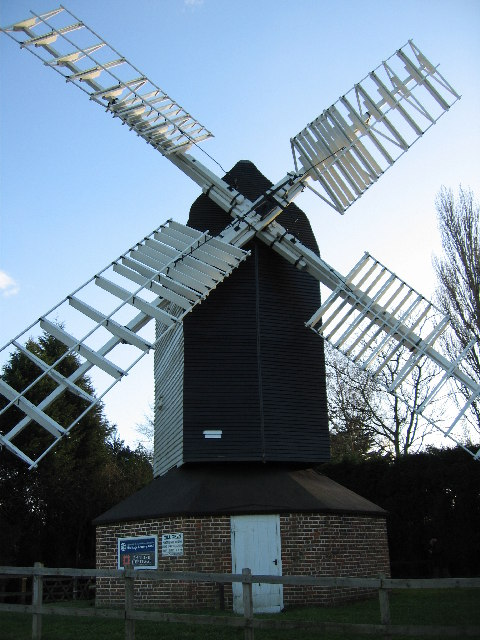
- The mill in 2006
- Interactive map of Ardeley Windmill

Origin
- Mill name: Cromer Mill
- Mill location: TL 304 286
- Coordinates: 51°56′27.84″N 0°06′13.22″W
- Operator: Hertfordshire Building Preservation Trust www.hertfordshirebpt.org
- Year built: 1681

Information
- Purpose: Corn mill
- Type: Post mill
- Roundhouse storeys: Single storey roundhouse
- No. of sails: Four sails
- Type of sails: Patent sails
- Windshaft: Cast iron
- Winding: Ladder mounted fantail
- Fantail blades: Eight blades
- Auxiliary power: Steam engine, later replaced by an Oil engine
- No. of pairs of millstones: Two pairs, a third pair driven by engine
- Size of millstones: One pair is 4 feet 4 inches (1.32 m) diameter
- Other information: Only surviving post mill in Hertfordshire

Cromer Windmill, restored in four stages between 1967 and 1998, is a Grade II* listed post mill at Cromer, Ardeley, Hertfordshire, England.

== History ==
The first windmill in Ardeley parish was built at some time between 1192 and 1222, in which year its existence is first documented. A windmill was stated to be "in ruins" in 1374 and another is mentioned in 1576, when it was sold to William Crane, and it is believed to have remained in his family for some 200 years. No windmill is shown on John Seller's map dated 1676 or Herman Moll's map dated 1700. Despite the omission from the latter map, tree-ring counts on the Mainpost show that the tree was felled in the spring of 1679, and a partially cut-away date on another timber reads 1681.

In 1719, Matthew Crane was the miller. In 1773, John Pearman of Luffenhall inherited the mill from his uncle, John Crane. Pearman sold the mill to Thomas Pearman in 1800. In 1822 the mill passed to William Munt, who worked the mill until his death in 1837, when the mill passed to his widow Edith, who worked it until 1856 when her son David took over. A local resident reported having found the mill one morning in the 1860s "lying a shattered mass of timber across the road". Although there is no actual record of this it is supported by dendrochronology dating of the east–west crosstree to 1840–85. If this timber failed in a westerly wind the mill would indeed have fallen across the road. In 1869 David Munt sold the remains of the mill for £600 to William Boorman in 1869, who already had a blacksmith's business in Cromer village. Boorman did not just rebuild the mill, he modernised it by fitting single-shuttered patent sails, and it is believed that he was also responsible for the significant amount of ironwork in the machinery, and for the fantail and roundhouse. He died in 1877 leaving the mill to his widow Emily. She ran the mill until 1888, when her son Ebenezer took over. A steam engine was being used as auxiliary power by this time, driving a set of stones at the mill house down the hill to the village. The mill was sold to Samuel Woollatt in the 1890s, but Ebenezer continued to work it until 1898, when Joseph Ponder Scowen bought it. During this period double-shuttered sails replaced the single ones, but it is not known which miller did this. In 1914 local carpenters Clem Reed and his father replaced those sails with a set of the current unique type. When a new 60 feet (18.29 m) long stock was imported from Sweden, the journey through Buntingford was not without difficulty as the stock went through a cottage window at one point. The steam engine had been replaced by an oil engine by 1919, which worked a pair of millstones on a hurst frame outside the roundhouse. Scowen worked the mill until his death in 1920. The mill was worked by Joseph Ponder Scowen's widow Marian for a couple of years, and in 1922 Richard Hull took the mill. Hull worked the mill until 1930, apparently using the oil engine after 1923, since the fantail had blown off by 1926 and one of the sails had been blown off by July 1929. The other three sails had been taken down by 1932 and the mill became derelict.

In 1938, organised by Captain Berry, a group of people who were concerned not to lose a major piece of local history re-boarded and painted the buck. Without this there would be no windmill in Hertfordshire today. During the war Ardeley Home Guard used the mill as an observation post, and cut a hole in the roof to spot enemy aircraft and parachutists. Despite this the buck survived intact otherwise, but by 1964 it was becoming dangerous and was threatened with demolition. In 1966 members of the fledgling Hertfordshire Building Preservation Trust launched an appeal, and raised £4000 to enable a first phase of restoration to take place between 1967 and 1969. The mill was given to the Trust in 1967 by the owner George Turner of Cottered, and the Trust determined to restore it to the condition in which it last worked. J. A. Elliott Ltd of Bishops Stortford rebuilt the roofs of the mill and roundhouse and re-boarded the buck. New stocks and sail frames (not of last working type), and a new tail ladder and skeleton fantail were made by E. Hole and Sons, the Burgess Hill millwrights. Further major structural repairs constituted Phase 2 in 1979/80. These were carried out by Millwrights International Ltd, and included work to prevent infestation by Death Watch beetles. and removal of sails and brakewheel. By 1989, thanks to a report by English Heritage, funds became available for Phase 3. At this point there was an unrealised proposal to use a helicopter to move the mill to a new site near Letchworth, where it could be rebuilt and put to work. In 1990, Phase 3 work carried out by Dorothea Restorations Ltd of Bristol included a new weather beam, rebuilding and fitting the brake wheel and making and fitting replicas of the last working sail stocks and frames. On 8 May 1991 the mill was opened to the public for the first time. Phase 4 in 1998 involved replacement of the meal beam; reconstruction of the bin floor; making and fitting of sail shutters, striking gear and stone furniture, and restoration of the internal machinery. This work was carried out by The Chiltern Partnership, funded by the Heritage Lottery Fund and English Heritage and returned the mill to virtually full working order. The mill was officially reopened on 21 June 1998 by Richard Whitmore

== Description ==
Cromer Windmill is a post mill with a single-storey roundhouse. The trestle, entirely made of oak, is enclosed by the roundhouse. The main post is 22 inches (560 mm) square at its lower end, and 20 inches (510 mm) diameter at the crown tree. It is 18 feet 9 inches (5.72 m) long. The crosstrees, 22 feet (6.71 m) long. are carried on four brick piers of about 5 feet (1.52 m) height. The four quarter bars are each 11 feet (3.35 m) long.

The body measures 17 feet (5.18 m) by 13 feet 4 inches (4.06 m) in plan, and is 26 feet (7.92 m) in height. The mill is 38 feet 6 inches (11.73 m) high overall. It is winded by a fantail mounted on the ladder. The four Patent sails are of unique configuration, with one-piece shutters spanning the full width of both leading and driving sides of the sails. Each sail is 26 feet (7.92 m) long and 7 feet (2.13 m) wide, spanning 56 feet (17.07 m). They are carried on a cast-iron windshaft which replaced an earlier wooden one. The windshaft carries a wooden clasp arm brake wheel with 72 cogs. The brake wheel drives a cast-iron wallower with 18 teeth, carried at the top of the cast iron upright shaft. At the lower end, the cast iron great spur wheel with 64 wooden cogs drives the two pairs of underdrift millstones located in the breast of the mill via cast-iron stone nuts with 32 teeth. The millstones comprise:

- LH Bedstone - 4 ft 3inch (1.3 m) French Burr, very worn.
- RH Bedstone - 3 ft 9inch (1.14m) French Burr, ex-Runner.
- In tail of buck - 4 ft 3inch (1.3.m) Derbyshire Peak Runner, near new.
- Outside roundhouse - 3 ft 9inch (1.14m) Derbyshire Peak Runner, broken and repaired, ex-Draper's Mill, Margate.

== Millers ==
- Matthew Crane 1719–74
- William Munt 1800–37
- Edith Munt 1837–56
- David Munt 1856–69
- William Alfred Boorman 1870–75
- Emily Boorman 1875–88
- Ebenezer Boorman 1888–98
- Joseph Ponder Scowen 1898–1920
- Marian Scowen 1920–22
- Richard Michael Hull 1922–30

Reference for above:-

== Public access ==
Cromer Windmill is open 2.30pm to 5pm on Sundays, Bank Holiday Mondays and second and fourth Saturdays from mid-May until mid-September and groups at other times by appointment.
