= List of Cranbrook Kingswood School alumni =

The following is a list of notable alumni of Cranbrook Kingswood School and its predecessors, Cranbrook School for Boys and Kingswood School for Girls.

== 1930s ==
- William Talman (1932), actor
- Florence Knoll (1934), designer; former head of Knoll
- Bob Bemer (1936), computer pioneer; co-inventor of ASCII; named COBOL
- William Henry Scott (1939), historian

== 1940s ==
- Natalie Zemon Davis (1945), historian
- Barbara Lea (1947), singer
- Daniel Ellsberg (1948), leaker of the Pentagon Papers

== 1950s ==
- Alan K. Simpson (1950), U.S. senator (R-Wyoming), 1979–1997
- Ward Just (1953), author
- Ivan Boesky (Class of 1955 but left prior to senior year), arbitrageur; convicted felon; an inspiration for character Gordon Gekko in the film Wall Street
- Pete Dawkins (1955), Heisman Trophy winner, Rhodes Scholar; former Army Brigadier General; former Vice Chairman of Citigroup Private Bank
- Martha Henry (1955), American-Canadian actress
- Thomas McGuane (1958), writer, essayist
- Edmund White (1958), author
- Raymond Sokolov (1959), journalist

== 1960s ==
- Joel E. Cohen (1961), mathematical biologist
- Tod Williams (1961), architect
- Michael Barone (1962), pundit and political commentator
- Charles Bigelow (1963), type designer; former professor of digital typography at Stanford University; co-designer of Lucida family of typefaces
- Taro Yamasaki (1964), Pulitzer Prize winner for photojournalism
- Mitt Romney (1965), U.S. senator from Utah; former governor of Massachusetts; Republican Party nominee for president of the United States in 2012
- Mary Fisher (1966), founder of Family AIDS Network; speaker at the 1992 Republican National Convention; daughter of businessman and philanthropist Max Fisher
- Ann Romney (1967), wife of Mitt Romney (1965)
- Cynthia Grissom Efird (1967), U.S. ambassador to Angola 2004–2007
- Reed Slatkin (1967), co-founder of EarthLink; convicted felon
- Bing Gordon (1968), chief creative officer, Electronic Arts
- Michael Kinsley (1968), journalist; commentator; founder of Slate; former editorial page editor of the Los Angeles Times
- Sven Birkerts (1969), author

== 1970s ==
- Kathryn Kolbert (1970), civil rights lawyer; former president of People For the American Way
- Brad Leithauser (1971), author
- Henry Tang (1971), former Chief Secretary for Administration of Hong Kong
- Scott McNealy (1972), CEO of Sun Microsystems
- Kenneth Dart (1972), venture capitalist, investor; co-owner of Dart Container
- Lisa Frank (1972), founder of Lisa Frank Inc.
- Dey Young (1973), actress
- Michael Eric Dyson (Class of 1976 but left after 2 years; did not graduate), author and radio host
- Dan Dickerson (1976), radio play-by-play announcer for the Detroit Tigers
- Bill Prady (1977), television writer and producer (The Muppets, Dharma & Greg, The Big Bang Theory)
- Jennifer Clement (1978), writer and president of PEN International
- Douglas Sills (1978), actor
- David Trott (1978), U.S. representative for Michigan's 11th congressional district 2015–2019
- Amy Denio (1979), musician
- Bob Woodruff (1979), co-anchor of ABC World News Tonight

== 1980s ==
- Rob Edwards (1981), television and feature film screenwriter and producer
- Robbie Buhl (1982), racecar driver
- Tim Westergren (1984), founder of Pandora Radio; included in TIME magazine's 2010 list of the 100 Most Influential People in the World
- Eric Fanning (class of 1986, left prior to graduation), 22nd Secretary of the Army
- Brad Keywell (1987), managing partner and co-founder of Lightbank; co-founder and director of Groupon, Mediaocean, and Echo Global Logistics
- Ronald Machen (1987), United States attorney for the District of Columbia
- Jay Adelson (1988), former CEO of Digg
- Glenn Kessler (1988), screenwriter and television producer (Damages)
- Alexi Lalas (1988), professional soccer player; played in the 1992 Summer Olympics and 1994 World Cup; National Soccer Hall of Fame
- Renée Elise Goldsberry (1989), actress (Hamilton; Ally McBeal)
- Ari Schwartz (1989), former senior director for Cybersecurity on the United States National Security Council Staff at the White House

== 1990s ==
- Elizabeth Berkley (Class of 1990 but left prior to senior year), actress
- Selma Blair (1990), actress
- Todd A. Kessler (1990), screenwriter, television producer, and director
- Rafał Trzaskowski (1991), mayor of Warsaw, Poland
- Elissa Slotkin (1994), politician and former CIA analyst serving as the U.S. senator from Michigan since 2025
- Jaime Ray Newman (1996), actress
- Jay Penske (Class of 1997, left prior to senior year), media and publishing entrepreneur; owner of WWD, Fairchild Publications, Variety Magazine, and other media brands

== 2000s ==
- Jamie Hodari (2000), co-founder and CEO of Industrious
- Ivan Krstić (2004), IT security engineer
- Casey Wellman (2006), professional hockey player (NHL)
- Andrew Miller (2007), professional hockey player (NHL)

== 2010s ==
- Patrick Brown (2010), professional hockey player (NHL)
- Chase Sui Wonders (2014), actress
