= Christopher Hedrick =

American scholar

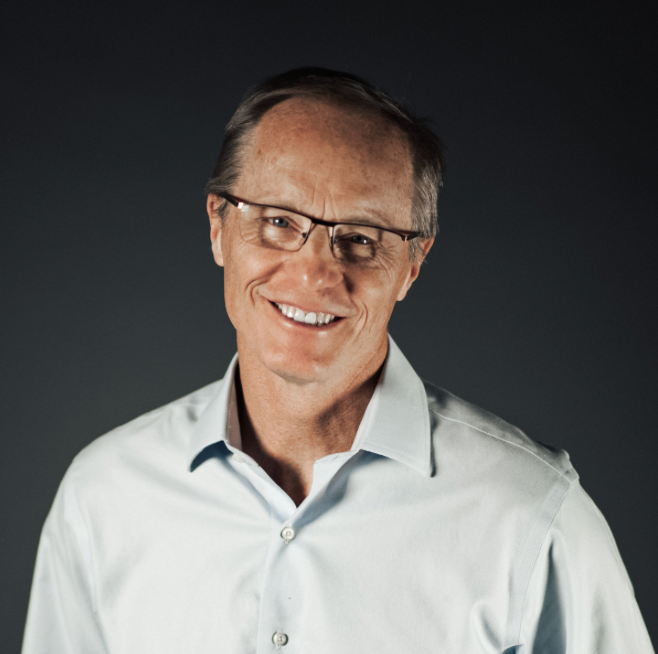
Hedrick in 2018

Christopher "Chris" Hedrick is an entrepreneur and expert in learning, global health, international development, and technology.

== NextStep ==
Hedrick was CEO of NextStep Interactive, a venture-capital backed company that trained low-wage and unemployed workers in job skills and industry certifications and places them in high demand entry-level healthcare jobs such as certified nursing assistant, the most in-demand job role in the country. The company played a prominent role in the effort to expand the supply of frontline healthcare workers in the face of the COVID-19 pandemic. Johnson & Johnson Impact Ventures and Village Capital awarded NextStep the 2020 Frontline Health Worker Prize for creating the most unique product solving a major pain point for frontline health workers and the patients they serve. Investors in the company include JAZZ Venture Partners, Pioneer Square Labs, Johnson & Johnson Impact Ventures, SEI Ventures, ZOMA Capital, and Springrock Ventures. NextStep operated in the states of Colorado, Oregon and Washington. In 2023, Care Academy acquired the NextStep learning platform and nursing assistant training content.

== Kepler ==
Prior to founding NextStep, from 2014 through 2016 Hedrick was CEO of Kepler, a university program based in Kigali, Rwanda that blends technology-based learning, intense local seminars and education-to-employment support to offer U.S.-accredited degrees at very low cost. Kepler's aim is to dramatically expand access to high quality college education across Africa. Hedrick led growth of Kepler from a start up class of 50 students to over 400 students on two campuses, one in Kigali and the other a unique program in partnership with the UNHCR based at the Kiziba Refugee Camp in western Rwanda.

== Peace Corps ==
From 2007 through 2014, Hedrick led the U.S. Peace Corps efforts in malaria prevention across Africa and was the Country Director for the Peace Corps in Senegal. Hedrick grew Peace Corps/Senegal to become the largest Peace Corps program in the world at the conclusion of his tenure there. Hedrick led the development of the Peace Corps/Senegal Food Security initiative which is the largest USAID-funded Peace Corps food security project in the world under the global Feed the Future program. The Peace Corps program in Senegal under Hedrick's leadership was awarded the prestigious Learning Spotlight Award in 2010 for innovation in its training programs. In 2012, he was awarded the Director's Distinguished Service Award, the agency's highest honor, for his work in creating and coordinating the Peace Corps Stomping Out Malaria in Africa initiative. After partnering with Peace Corps Senegal in a major bed net distribution effort, the international NGO Malaria No More called Hedrick "part international diplomat, part community health worker, part development MacGyver" in its annual report. In 2014, the government of Senegal awarded him the title of "Champion of the Fight Against Malaria." Hedrick promoted the concept of the "New Peace Corps," the professionalization and modernization of Peace Corps programming and service, including enhanced partnerships with USAID and other development institutions and improved utilization of technology, a vision summarized in an article in the Yale Journal of International Affairs. Hedrick, his Peace Corps volunteers, and staff co-authored numerous peer reviewed journal articles based on their work and partnerships developed while Hedrick led the Senegal program, particularly in the field of public health.

== Intrepid Learning Solutions ==
From 1999 to 2007, Hedrick was the president and CEO of Intrepid Learning Solutions, a Seattle, Washington-based learning technology company which he co-founded with Dennis Heck. Under his leadership, Intrepid was named by Inc. magazine as one of the fastest-growing companies in America. Hedrick raised investments for Intrepid from venture capital companies Madrona Venture Group, FTV Capital, and Rustic Canyon Partners and from individuals including William H. Gates, Sr. While Hedrick was CEO, Intrepid signed a landmark contract to provide outsourced training services to the Boeing Company, landed other clients such as Microsoft, United Airlines, Autodesk, and Bank of America, and was named one of the Top 20 Learning Outsourcing Providers in the world. In 2014, the training outsourcing arm of Intrepid was sold to Xerox to bolster its learning services division. In 2017, Ingram, through its corporate education and training division Vitalsource, acquired Intrepid's learning technology management platform and line of business in a cash transaction.

== Science and Technology Advisor to the Governor of Washington State ==
Previously, he served as the Science and Technology Policy advisor to Gary Locke, the Governor of Washington state, subsequently U.S. Secretary of Commerce and Ambassador to China. During his tenure as the governor's advisor, Washington was named as the state government that most effectively used information technology. While serving as the Science and Technology Policy advisor, Hedrick also was named to lead the Washington State Year 2000 Office, appointed by the Governor to be the public face of the state's Y2K preparations.

== Gates Library Foundation ==
Prior to joining the Locke Administration, he was the founding Director of Strategy and Operations for the Gates Library Foundation, the predecessor organization to the Bill and Melinda Gates Foundation. Hedrick organized and presented the original proposal to Bill Gates to create a $200 million private philanthropic initiative focused on expanding access to the Internet and providing training and technical assistance to public libraries serving low-income communities.

== Microsoft ==
The Gates Library Foundation grew out of a program called Libraries Online that Hedrick created and managed at Microsoft. At Microsoft, Hedrick was a prominent advocate of bridging the "digital divide." He managed Microsoft's relationships with the United Negro College Fund and with the University of Washington and the state community college system, where he developed and managed a software donation that was the largest in industry history at that time. This donation was announced at a joint event between President Bill Clinton and Microsoft CEO Bill Gates which Hedrick proposed and managed.

== Earlier career ==
He has also been a senior administrator at the Peace Corps, where he worked for Carol Bellamy; served in the administration of Washington Governor Booth Gardner; was elected to the Olympia, Washington School Board; and was a Peace Corps Volunteer in Senegal. He worked for Congressman Don Bonker in Washington, D.C., directed his Olympia, Washington district office and managed Bonker's last two successful re-election campaigns,

Hedrick was a Rhodes Scholar at Oxford University and graduated with honors and distinction from Stanford University. He is a graduate of Olympia High School and was elected as a director of the Olympia School District in 1991. In 2013, he was inducted into the Olympia High School Hall of Fame.

== Non-profit Leadership ==
Until he moved back to Senegal, he was the chairman of the board of trustees of The Evergreen State College, board member and Treasurer for the Program for Appropriate Technology in Health (PATH), the largest recipient of Gates Foundation funding for global health, and the chairman of the board of the Digital Learning Commons. He also served on the board of directors of LINGOs, a non-profit promoting sustainable global development by helping to build the capacity of the people delivering programs around the world.
