= Jamie Hodari =

American Entrepreneur

- Education: Columbia University (BA); Harvard University (MPP); Yale University (JD)
- Title: CEO, Industrious and Chief Executive Officer, Building Operations & Experience and Chief Commercial Officer, CBRE

Jamie Hodari is an American entrepreneur. He is the founder and CEO of the flexible workplace provider Industrious. In 2025 Hodari became CBRE's Chief Executive Officer, Building Operations & Experience and Chief Commercial Officer.

== Biography ==
Hodari grew up in Bloomfield Hills, Michigan. He graduated from the Cranbrook Schools and received his B.A. from Columbia University, an M.P.P. from Harvard Kennedy School, and a J.D. from Yale Law School. Hodari worked as a reporter for The Times of India after learning Hindi and Urdu in college, then for the law firm Sullivan & Cromwell after law school and was an analyst at Birch Run Capital.

Hodari left finance to head a private college scholarship program for orphans of the Rwandan genocide called Generation Rwanda. He co-founded and served as CEO of Kepler, an experimental university tasked with bringing accessible higher education to Rwanda.

In 2012, Hodari co-founded Industrious with Justin Stewart, his next-door neighbor, who was then heading the U.S. arm of a Chinese Real Estate company. The two had similar unpleasant experiences in shared workspaces, which inspired them to start a premium flexible workplace company. The company has grown to over 500 employees over 150 locations in over 65 markets in the United States and worldwide as well as one of Inc. magazine's fastest growing companies in 2020.

In 2025, Industrious was acquired by CBRE in a deal valued at $800 million. Hodari continues to hold his title as CEO of Industrious while also overseeing a new business segment at CBRE called Building Operations & Experience (BOE), created to deliver end-to-end building operating solutions at a global scale.

== In popular culture ==
Hodari was played by Jordan Bridges in the 2022 miniseries WeCrashed.

== Personal life ==
Hodari lives in Fort Greene, Brooklyn.
