= Broadway Plaza (Walnut Creek) =

Shopping mall in California

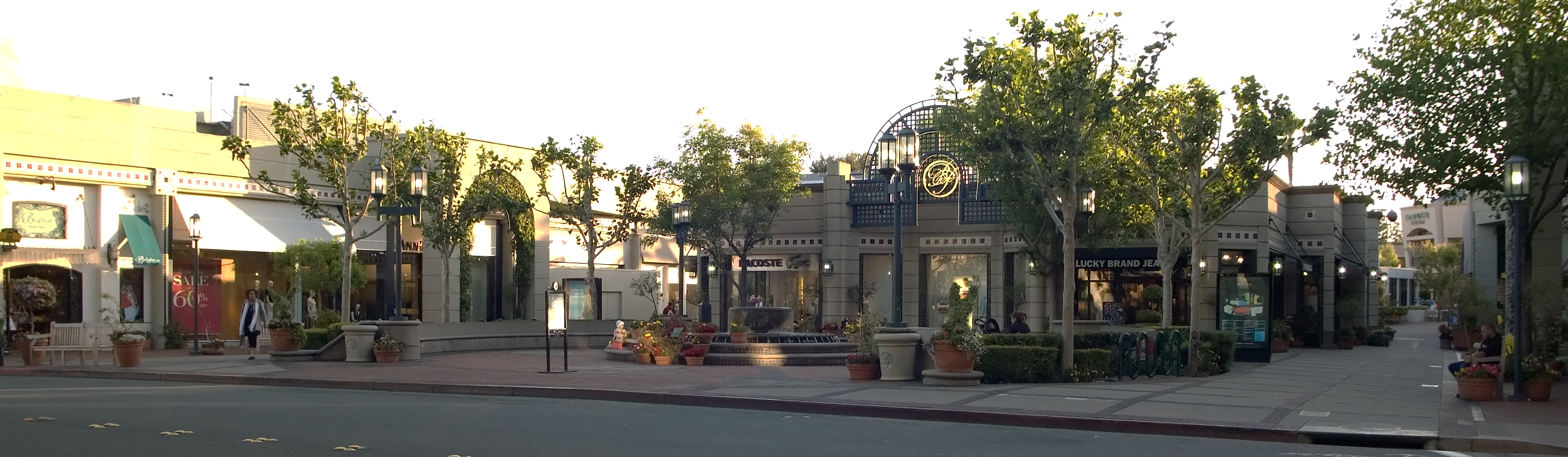
- Broadway Plaza before its 2016 renovation.
- Location: Walnut Creek, California, United States
- Coordinates: 37.89551°N 122.05786°W
- Address: 1275 Broadway Plaza
- Opened: October 18, 1951; 75 years ago
- Developer: Graeme McDonald
- Manager: Macerich
- Owner: Macerich
- Num. of stores: 80 (as of Jan 2017)
- Num. of anchor tenants: 4
- Floor area: 776,000 sq ft (72,100 m^{2})
- Floors: 1 (2 in Macy's, Neiman Marcus, Nordstrom, Zara, H&M, Arhaus, and Parking Garage)
- Parking: 2,451
- Website: broadwayplaza.com

Broadway Plaza is an outdoor shopping mall located in downtown Walnut Creek, California. The shopping center opened on October 11, 1951 and is owned and operated by Macerich. The mall is anchored by Nordstrom and Macy's, and features nearly 80 stores including flagship H&M and ZARA stores, a standalone Apple store with an adjoining outdoor plaza, an Industrious co-working space, a Life Time Fitness sports club, and other retailers such as Ray-Ban, lululemon, Anthropologie, Coach, and GAP.

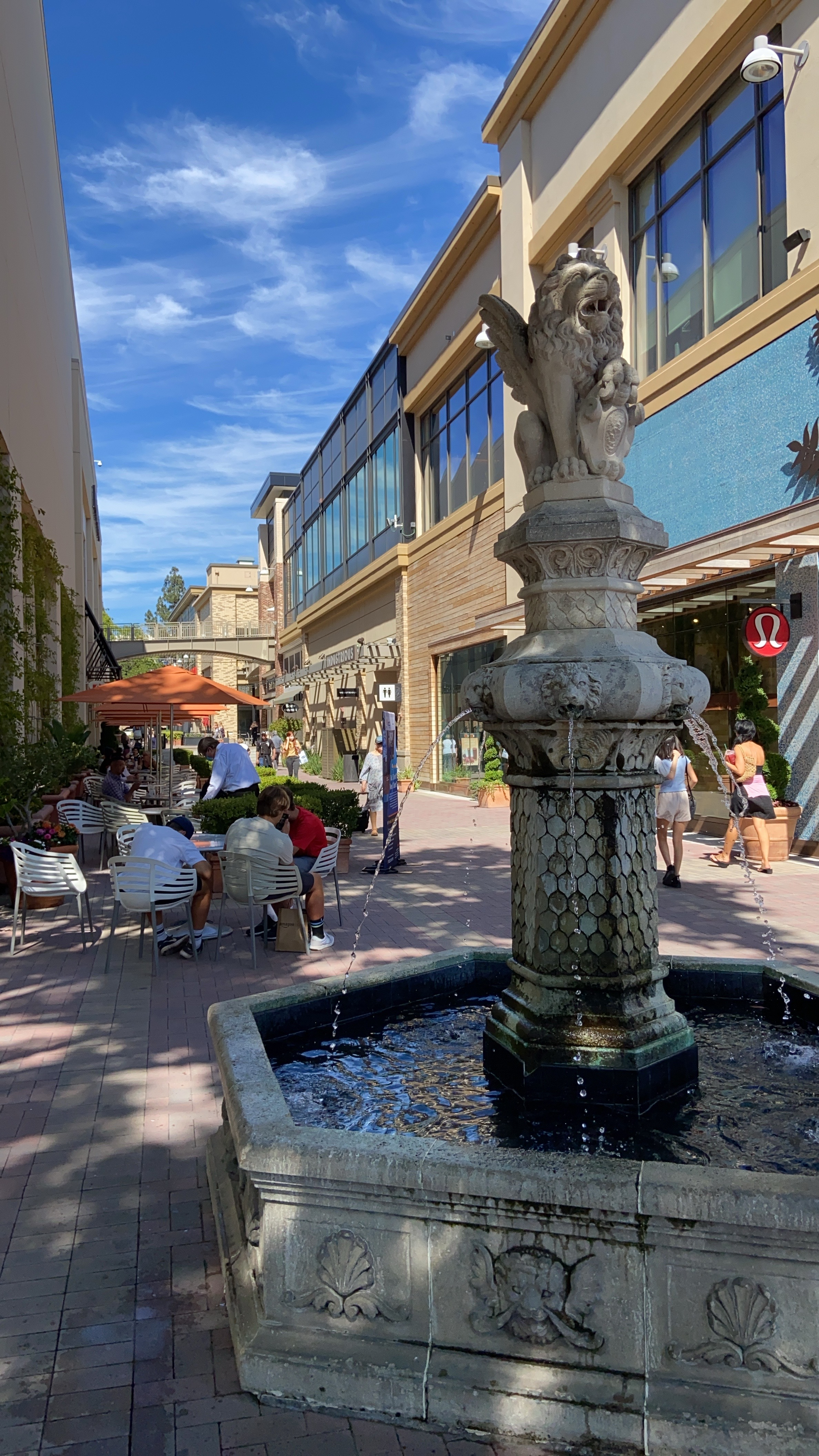
A fountain inside Broadway Plaza, Walnut Creek

== History ==
Broadway Plaza opened on October 18, 1951 with 38 stores. JCPenney, Sears, Woolworths, Joseph Magnin (later I. Magnin), and a Lucky Supermarket were the mall's original anchors. In 1954, Oakland-based department store Capwell's opened as the center's fifth anchor.

Lucky was replaced by Northern California's second Bullock's department store in 1973, which was in turn converted to Nordstrom in 1984.

Capwell's became Emporium-Capwell in 1979, and was converted to Macy's in 1995; while I.Magnin was converted to a separate Macy's Men's store that same year. A renovation occurred at the property in the early 1990s, adding a unified architectural and landscaping scheme to the property when it previously had none. Crate & Barrel opened a two-level store at the property in 1992. A former parking lot adjacent to Crate & Barrel was replaced with a pedestrian plaza in 1994, with a fountain, a retail building, and a stand-alone California Pizza Kitchen restaurant. Finally, a new, multi-floor parking structure was built in the southwest corner of the property behind the Macy's Men's store.

After a protracted legal battle, a Neiman Marcus department store opened at the property in 2012, the first of several major changes to occur at the property.

== Expansion ==
Plans for an extensive renovation of the mall, including the addition of 300,000 sq ft (28,000 m^{2}) of new retail space, were approved in December 2013. The expansion consolidated the two Macy's stores into the Macy's Women's store building, which was expanded and remodeled, and replaced the former single-level retail space and parking structure between Macy's and Nordstrom with a two-level retail building and multi-level parking structure. The first tenants in the expansion opened in September 2016. Additional tenants and a two-level Zara store (located on a partial portion of the land once home to the Macy's Men's store) opened for business before the Christmas shopping season.

California Pizza Kitchen moved near S. Main Street and T-Mobile, in 2016, with tenants of the adjacent stand-alone building moving into the mall's expansion wing that same year. A new stand-alone Apple store and a revitalized pedestrian plaza were then proposed for the land occupied by the two vacant buildings. Apple and the new plaza commenced construction in early 2017, and opened in Summer of 2018. Life Time Fitness, an upscale large-format sports club, began construction on the remainder of the former Macy's Men's footprint in 2021 after a series of delays related to the COVID-19 pandemic, and opened in September 2023.

In mid-2020, Neiman Marcus announced it would close its Walnut Creek store as part of a bankruptcy filing. Neiman Marcus closed in January 2021, and the building sat vacant until the following year when Crate & Barrel temporarily moved into the space. The former Crate & Barrel store was then converted to Pinstripes, a restaurant and entertainment concept, which opened on November 15, 2024. Pinstripes closed down permanently in September 2025 due to undergoing Chapter 11 Bankruptcy; the space remains vacant. Crate & Barrel exited the former Neiman Marcus building for a new, permanent store across from the Apple Store & Anthropologie in mid-2023, leaving the building vacant.

Property owner Macerich purchased a retail building adjacent to the former Neiman Marcus and a then-operating P.F. Chang's locations in 2022, for a planned redevelopment. P.F. Chang's later closed in 2023. Luxury furniture retailer RH was later announced as the replacement tenant for the former Neiman Marcus building, with a planned multi-building "compound" slated to open in 2026.
