= Cambridge Heath railway station =

London Overground station

Cambridge Heath
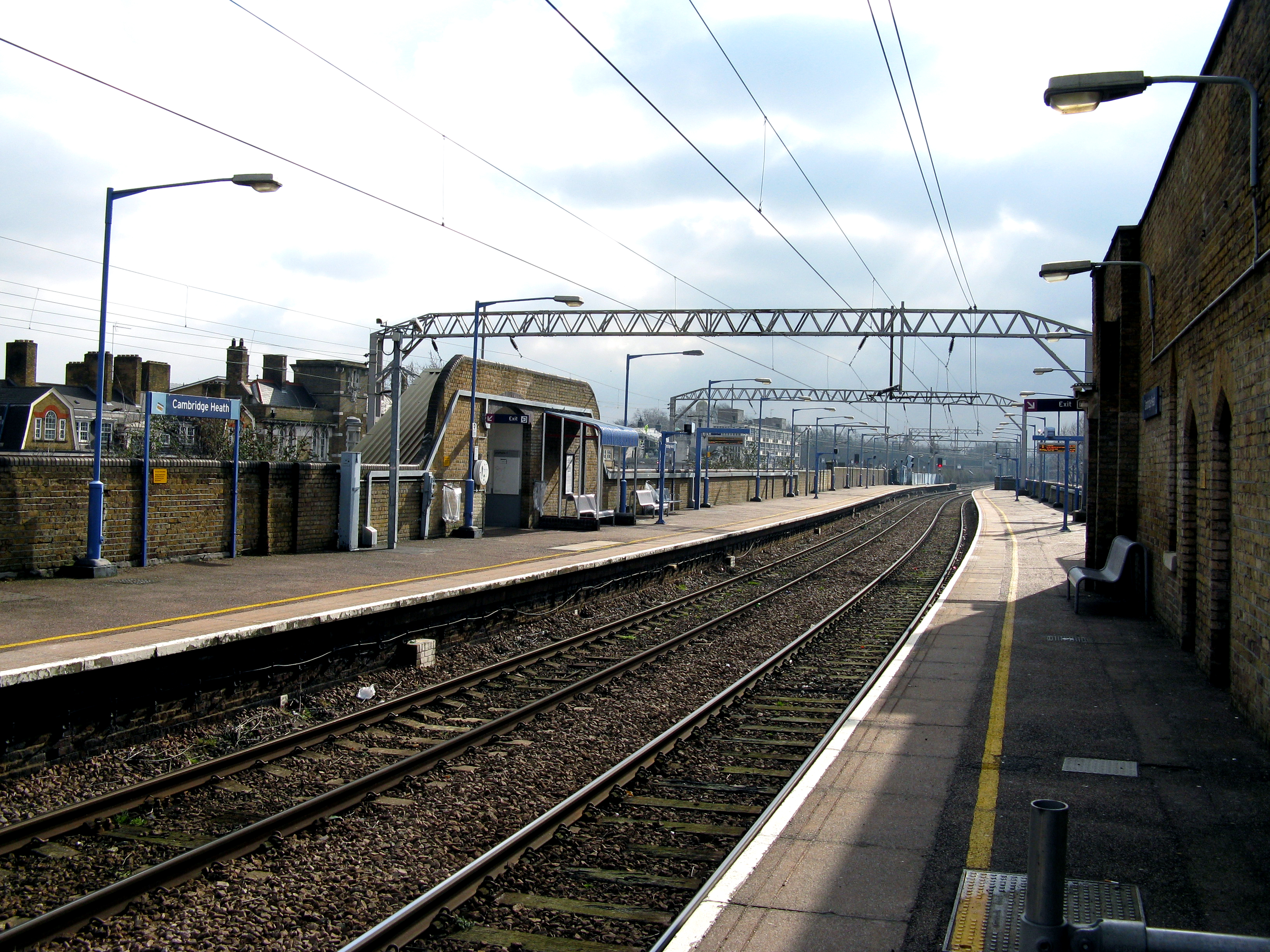
- Cambridge Heath railway station in February 2010
- Interactive map of Cambridge Heath

General information
- Location: Cambridge Heath
- Local authority: London Borough of Tower Hamlets
- Managed by: London Overground
- Owner: Network Rail
- Station code: CBH
- DfT category: F1
- Number of platforms: 2
- Fare zone: 2

National Rail annual entry and exit
- 2020–21: ▼0.252 million
- 2021–22: ▲0.602 million
- 2022–23: ▲0.771 million
- 2023–24: ▲1.051 million
- 2024–25: 1.051 million

Railway companies
- Original company: Great Eastern Railway
- Pre-grouping: Great Eastern Railway
- Post-grouping: London and North Eastern Railway

Key dates
- 27 May 1872: Station opened
- 22 May 1916: Temporarily closed
- 5 May 1919: Reopened
- 17 February 1986: Temporarily closed
- 15 March 1986: Reopened

Other information
- External links: Departures; Facilities
- Coordinates: 51.5321°N 0.0572°W

Cambridge Heath is a station on the Weaver line of the London Overground, located in Cambridge Heath, East London. The station is 1 mile 61 chains (2.8 km) down the line from London Liverpool Street and is situated between Bethnal Green and London Fields on the Weaver line branch to Cheshunt and Enfield Town. Its three-letter station code is CBH and it is in London fare zone 2.

Originally opened by the Great Eastern Railway in 1872, the station was expanded to four tracks in 1894 to accommodate non-stopping services. The station was temporarily closed due to World War I, and had a reduced service for many years; there were no daytime services until 1998 and no evening or weekend services until 2001.

== History ==
=== Great Eastern Railway (1872–1922) ===
The station was opened on 27 May 1872 by the Great Eastern Railway (GER) as part of a more direct route to Enfield Town which before opening was accessed via Angel Road station. The station was located on a viaduct, had two platforms and a station building on the Up (east) side.

In 1894, with increasing traffic, the GER opened two additional tracks on the eastern side, which are known as the Fast Lines today, to allow longer distance trains to bypass the station. No platforms were opened on these new lines. The 1872 station building was also demolished at that time, being replaced by a new building constructed beside the Fast Lines with access to platforms provided by means of a subway. During World War I the station was closed as a wartime economy measure from 22 May 1916, and was subsequently reopened on 5 May 1919.

=== London and North Eastern Railway (1923–1947) ===
After the Railways Act 1921, the country's railways were grouped into four companies, with effect from 1 January 1923. At Cambridge Heath, the London & North Eastern Railway (LNER) took over operations of the GER services.

In 1935, the semaphore signalling was replaced by single searchlight signals which were able to display three aspects (Green, Yellow or Red) through different changeable lens arrangements. It was also in 1935 that electrification of the lines through Cambridge Heath was suggested, although many years were to pass before these plans came to fruition.

=== British Railways (1948–1994) ===
Upon nationalisation in 1948 responsibility for operating the station fell to British Railways (Eastern Region). The lines through Hackney were electrified in the late 1950s with electric services commencing operation on 21 November 1960.

=== Privatisation (1994–present) ===
The station, along with neighbouring London Fields, was for many years only served during weekday peak periods, with regular daytime services not restarting until 1998, and evening and Saturday services from 2001. Oyster pay as you go cards were introduced at the station in 2008. The station and all services that call were previously operated by Abellio Greater Anglia. In May 2015, Cambridge Heath transferred to London Overground and now appears on the tube map.

As of November 2018, the station will take part in a "pay by face" facial technology trial called "Gateless Gatelines". It will be used for a trial to "nudge" passengers into ensuring they tap their payment card. In the three-month data-gathering exercise 3D mapping "stereoscopic depth sensors" resembling ceiling-mounted shower heads will track people's movements. The system will be able to analyse from a person's movement through the gate whether they have touched in on the Oyster reader."

== Services ==
All services at Cambridge Heath are operated as part of the Weaver line of the London Overground using Class 710 EMUs.

The typical off-peak service in trains per hour is:

- 4 tph to London Liverpool Street
- 2 tph to Cheshunt
- 2 tph to Enfield Town

Additional services call at the station during the peak hours.

| Preceding station | London Overground | Following station |
|---|---|---|
| Bethnal Green towards Liverpool Street | Weaver line Lea Valley lines | London Fields towards Cheshunt or Enfield Town |

== Connections ==
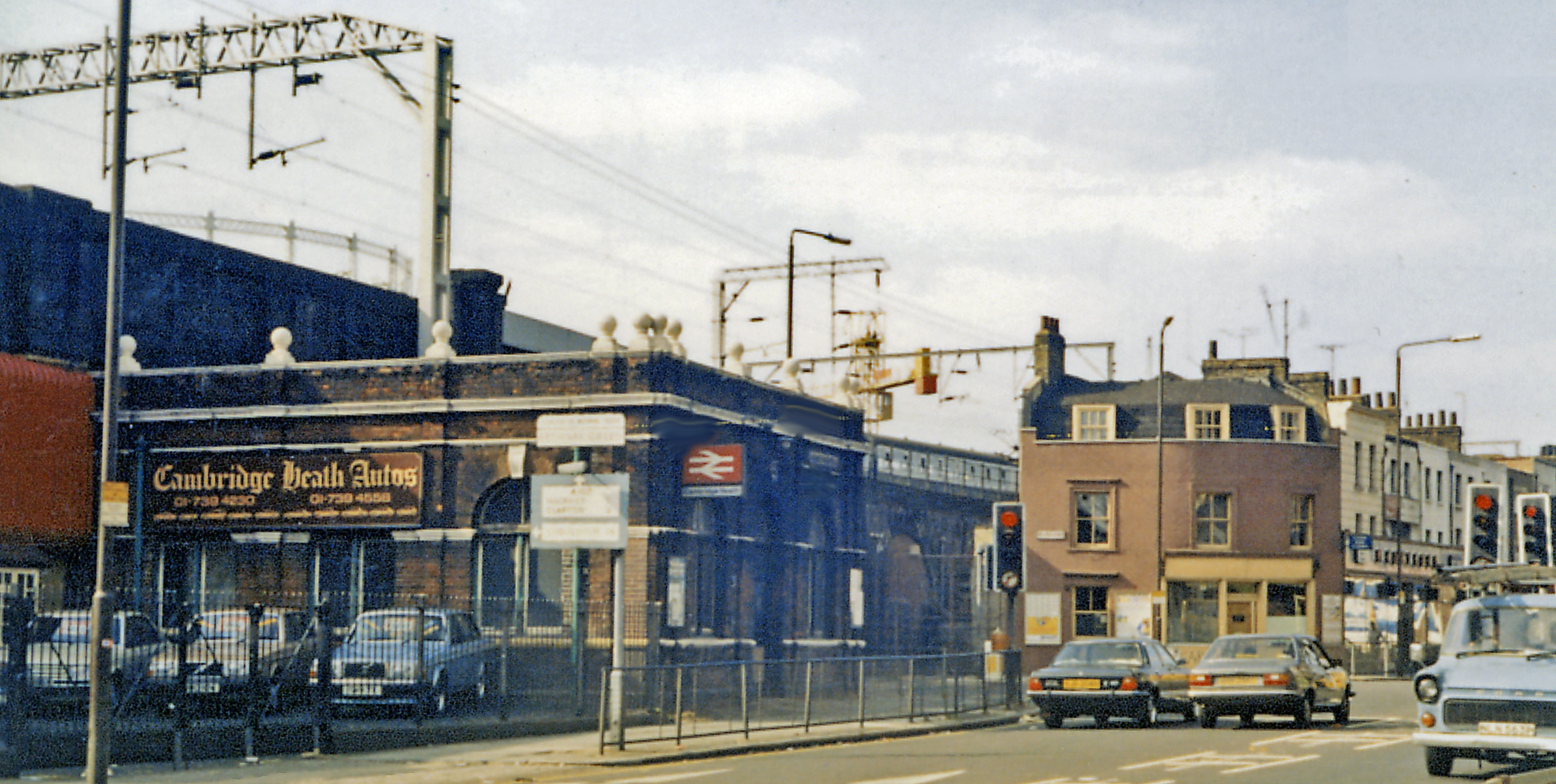
Cambridge Heath in August 1983

London Buses services serves the station, routes 106, 26, 55, 254, 388, D6 and night routes N26, N55 and N253.
