= United Infrastructure =

Construction company

United Infrastructure Ltd
- Trade name: United Infrastructure
- Company type: Private
- Industry: Telecoms, Water, Energy, Social Housing, Streetlighting, Civils
- Founded: September 2014
- Headquarters: Lingley Mere Business Park, Warrington, United Kingdom
- Number of locations: 13
- Area served: United Kingdom
- Key people: Neil Armstrong, CEO and Chairman
- Revenue: £718M (2025)
- Parent: Apollo Global Management (2023–present)
- Subsidiaries: United Living Water, United Living Energy, united Living Connected, Afeco, Jones Lighting, Peter Duffy Ltd, Glenelly IS Ltd, PiLON Ltd, Heatly, GTEC Training Ltd
- Website: unitedinfrastructure.com

United Infrastructure (formerly United Living Group) is a construction company. In 2023, Apollo Global Management completed the purchase of the company.

== History ==
The company was formed from the merger of Bullock Construction Ltd and United House Ltd (the contracting division of United House Group) in September 2014 Lloyds Development Capital (LDC) had an ownership stake in both companies: in April 2008 LDC invested in the management buy-out of Bullock Construction Limited and in March 2010, United House secured financial backing from LDC to continue its expansion.

=== United House ===
The origin of United House lies with Geoffrey Granter who founded it as Harp Heating in 1964. Initially, the core business was installing central heating in council housing while the tenants remained in occupation. Harp Heating broadened this service into an internal refurbishment product for the GLC. Michael Rayfield was joint MD with Geoffrey Granter of Harp heating before the group changed its name. After Jeffrey Adams joined the company in 1981, becoming its joint owner with Granter, the company changed its name to United House and expanded into housebuilding and housing refurbishment. In the 1990s, the company won business under the Private Finance Initiative linked to the Decent Homes Programme. A development division named Modern City Living was established in 1990. In 2008, Modern City Living was rebranded United House Developments.

Granter retired from the business in 2008 and Steven Halbert joined the board as chairman. Lloyds Development Capital (LDC) invested a minority stake and RBS provided bank loans to fund further expansion in inner city private housebuilding.

=== Merged company ===
On 16 September 2014, a restructuring of United House Group was announced. United House's construction business (United House Ltd) merged with Bullock Construction, which was also owned by LDC. The new construction company was called United Living Group, and Bullock's CEO Ian Burnett become the Group Chief Executive. Later in 2014, United House Developments, headed by Adams as chairman and Rick de Blaby as CEO, became a separate development company, based in London.

The new brand United Living Group was launched on 1 April 2015.

=== Acquisition by Fastflow Group ===
In 2019, United Living was acquired by Fastflow Group bringing together their construction, utilities and property maintenance businesses. Fastflow Group CEO, Neil Armstrong becoming CEO and chairman of the new group. In January 2023, the business reported pre-tax losses of around £21m for the second year running, on revenue of £437m.

=== Acquisition of Wood’s UK Transmission & Distribution business ===
In December 2025, it was announced United Infrastructure had agreed to acquire John Wood Group’s UK Transmission & Distribution business for £57.5 million. The purchase would add engineering and installation capabilities in overhead line and underground cable projects to the company’s existing infrastructure portfolio.
