= London Fields railway station =

London Overground station

London Fields
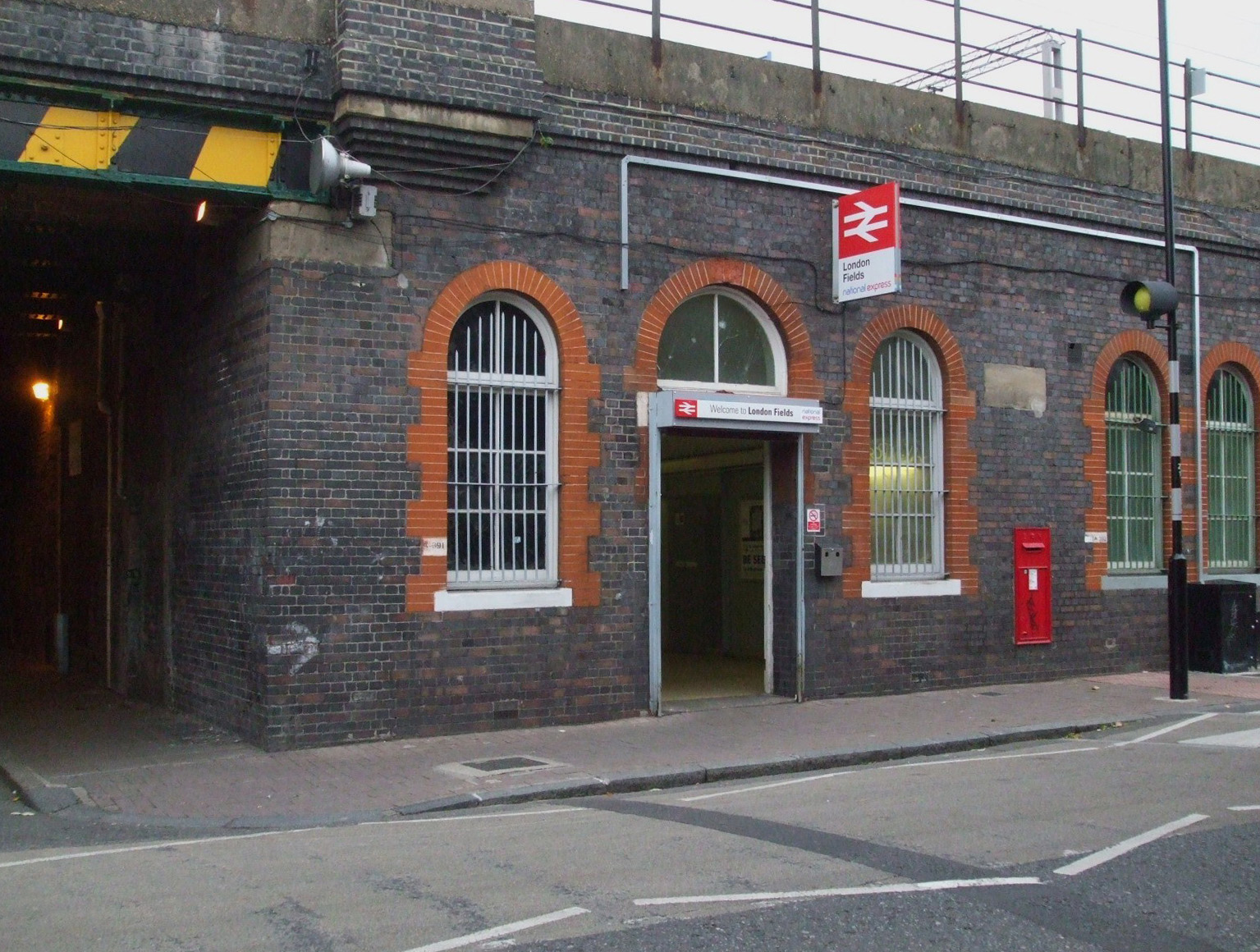
- Entrance to London Fields railway station in October 2008
- Interactive map of London Fields

General information
- Location: London Fields
- Local authority: London Borough of Hackney
- Managed by: London Overground
- Station code: LOF
- DfT category: F1
- Number of platforms: 2
- Fare zone: 2

National Rail annual entry and exit
- 2020–21: ▼0.347 million
- 2021–22: ▲0.945 million
- 2022–23: ▲1.373 million
- 2023–24: ▲1.824 million
- 2024–25: ▲1.911 million

Other information
- External links: Departures; Facilities
- Coordinates: 51.5407°N 0.0577°W

London Fields is a station on the Weaver line of the London Overground, serving the district of London Fields in the London Borough of Hackney, east London. It is 2 miles 35 chains (3.9 km) down-line from London Liverpool Street and is situated between Cambridge Heath and Hackney Downs. Its three-letter station code is LOF and it is in London fare zone 2.

== History ==
The station dates from 1872 when it was opened by the Great Eastern Railway. It was closed from 22 May 1916 and reopened 1 July 1919 as a wartime economy measure. Electrification of the line was instituted in 1960, and London Fields station was reduced to weekday peak period-only service for much of the 1980s and 1990s. It had its services suspended altogether for five years after a fire in 1981 that seriously damaged the main station buildings, putting its future in serious doubt. Repairs were eventually carried out and the station reopened in 1986, though still on a limited basis (like the neighbouring Cambridge Heath). Both stations eventually regained a regular daytime service after a 1998 timetable change. Evening and Saturday trains were added in 2001, and the current service level including Sunday trains commenced in 2005.

London Fields and all services that call were previously operated by Abellio Greater Anglia. However, in May 2015 they were transferred to London Overground operations and the station was added to the tube map.

== Services ==
All services at London Fields are operated as part of the Weaver line of the London Overground using Class 710 EMUs.

The typical off-peak service in trains per hour is:

- 4 tph to London Liverpool Street
- 2 tph to Cheshunt
- 2 tph to Enfield Town

Additional services call at the station during the peak hours.

| Preceding station | London Overground | Following station |
|---|---|---|
| Cambridge Heath towards Liverpool Street | Weaver line Lea Valley lines | Hackney Downs towards Cheshunt or Enfield Town |

== Bibliography ==
- Body, G. (1986), PSL Field Guides - Railways of the Eastern Region, Volume 1, Patrick Stephens Ltd, Wellingborough, ISBN 0-85059-712-9
