= Cambridge Heath =

Coordinates: 51.5337°N 0.05727°W

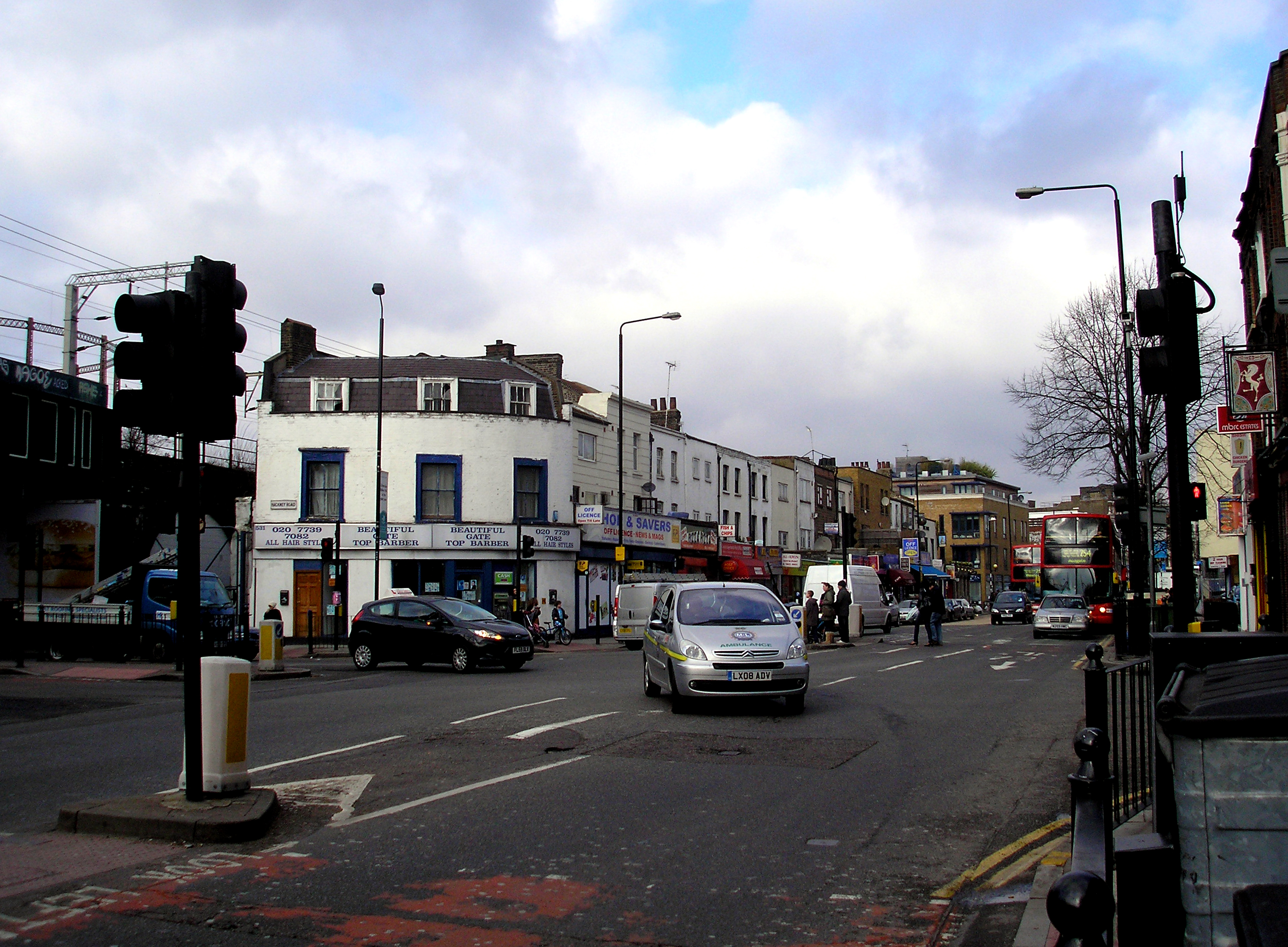
- Cambridge Heath Road, looking north.

- Location within Greater London
- OS grid reference: TQ348832
- London borough: Tower Hamlets
- Ceremonial county: Greater London
- Region: London
- Country: England
- Sovereign state: United Kingdom
- Post town: LONDON
- Postcode district: E2
- Dialling code: 020
- Police: Metropolitan
- Fire: London
- Ambulance: London
- UK Parliament: Bethnal Green and Stepney
- London Assembly: City and East

Cambridge Heath is an area in the London Borough of Tower Hamlets, approximately 5.7 km (3.5 mi) north east of Charing Cross. It is named after a former heath in the East End of London. The northern boundary is formed by the Regent's Canal and the area includes Vyner Street, best known for its street art and galleries.

The area is served by Cambridge Heath railway station, operated by London Overground.

== Toponymy ==
The earliest known written use of the name was, as Camprichthesheth, in 1275; other variations soon followed. It could be unconnected with Cambridge instead from an Old English plant (such as comfrey) or unusual-form man's name. The area was once marshland and forest which, as Bishopswood, lingered in the east until the 16th century.

== History ==
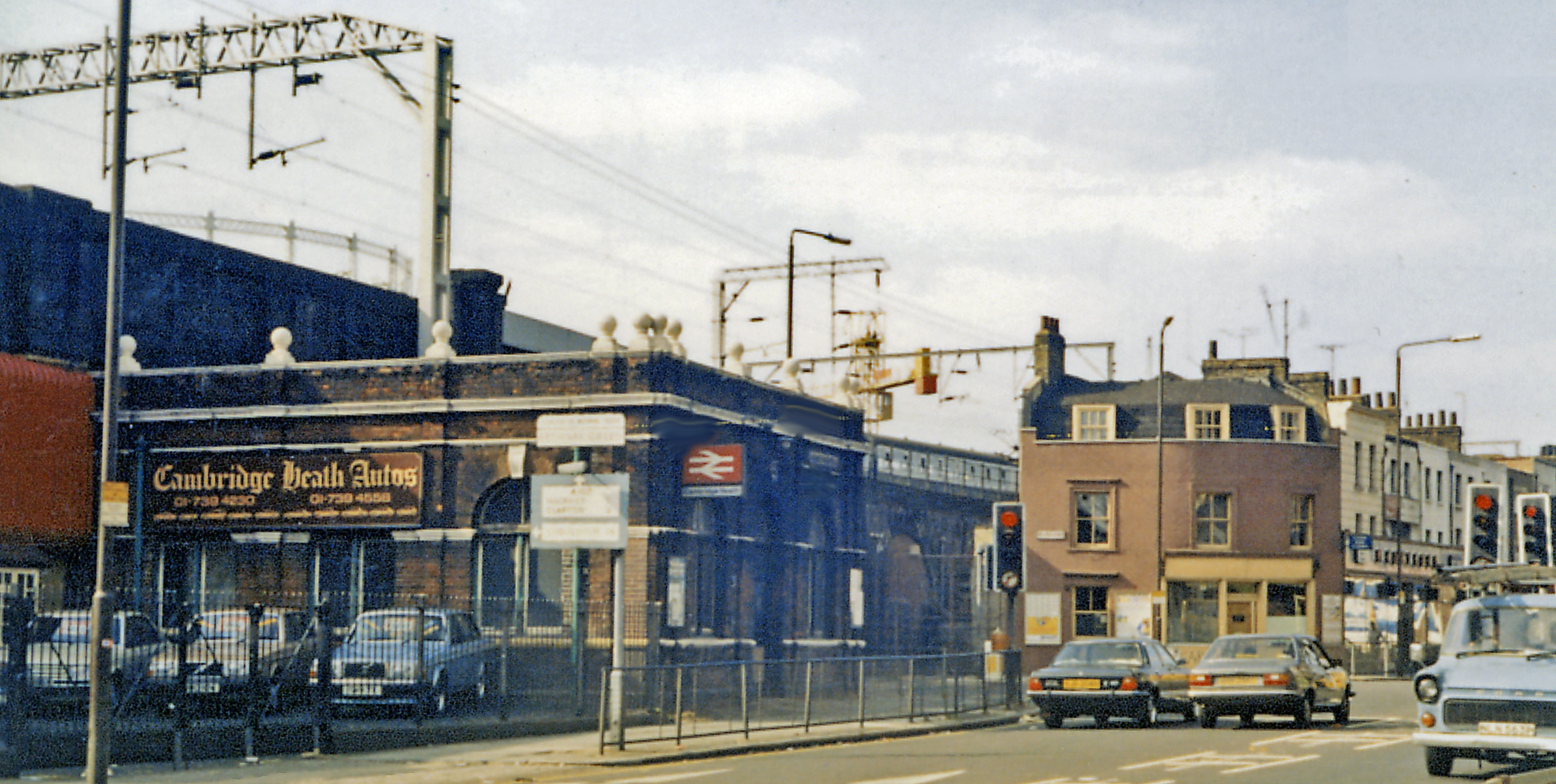
Cambridge Heath in 1983

Cambridge Heath was a small village within the ancient parish of Bethnal Green, and was mostly agricultural up until dwellings began to sprout in the mid-18th century, when the trustees of Parmiters purchased a part of the west side of Cambridge Road, on either side of Hackney Road. Several cottages had been built in the settlement. More sustained activity began in 1786, when six more houses were built. By 1800, Cambridge Place formed the north-western boundary of the area.

The Bethnal Green gasworks in Cambridge Heath, named after the then-Metropolitan Borough of Bethnal Green were built in 1866 and 1889 by designer, John Clark. Prior to the 1960s the sites were used to manufacture and store town gas made from coal. Following the discovery of natural gas in the North Sea in the 1960s, the gas holders continued to be used to store natural gas.

During the Second World War, the Luftwaffe began The Blitz on 7 September 1940. Cambridge Heath was in "Target Area A" along with the rest of the East End of London.

The Hare public house opened before 1900. An ex-Truman's Brewery tied house, it is now a free house. The Hare was described as the epitome of a 'good, honest pub' by the Evening Standard and listed as one of the best 50 in London in 2019.

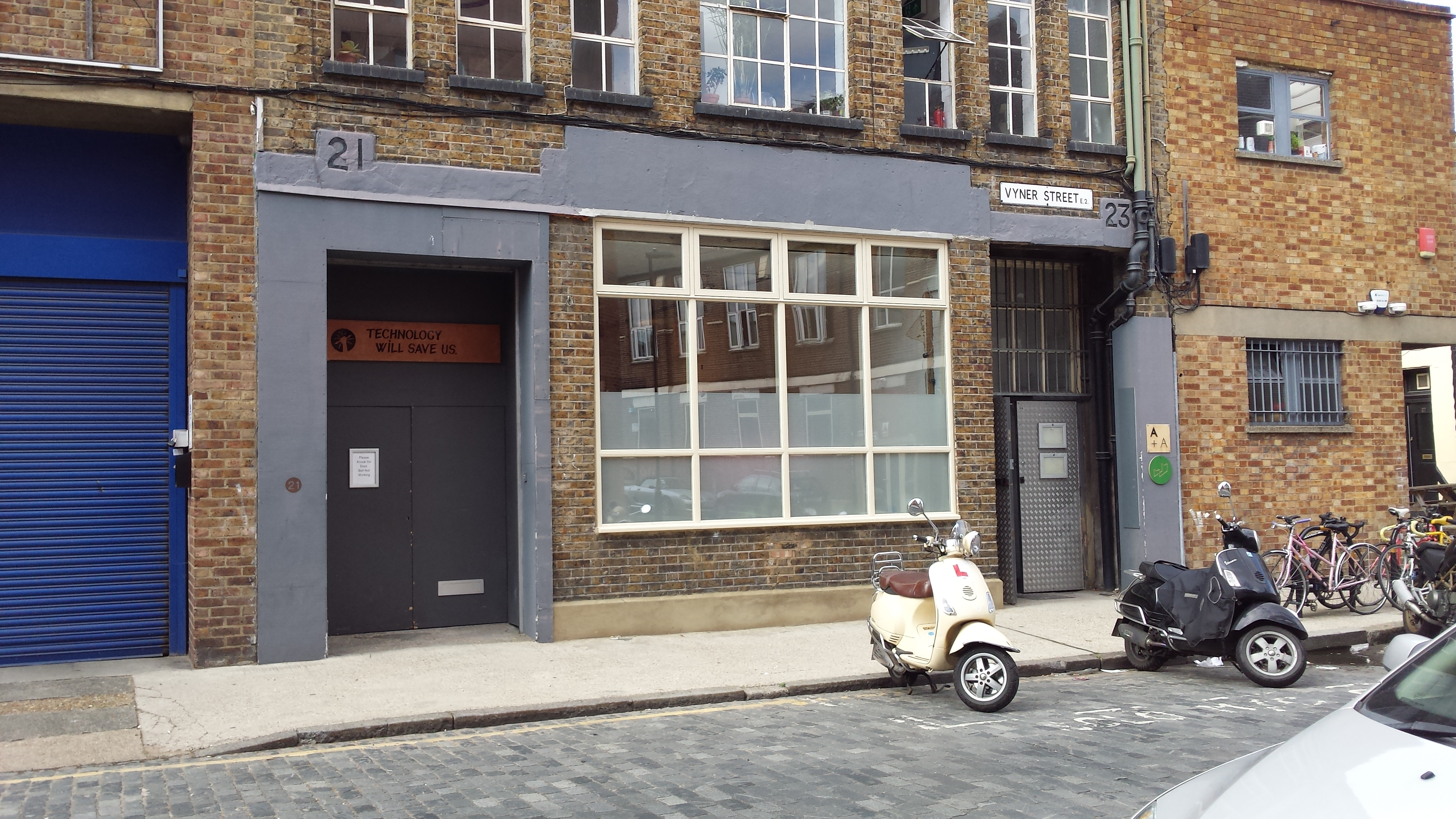
Vyner Street in 2016.

Cambridge Heath station was chosen in 2018 for a historic trial with a pay-by-face system that may end the need for station barriers, due to its low passenger volumes and having no gates.

== Governance ==
Cambridge Heath is in the constituency of Bethnal Green and Stepney represented by the Labour Party's Rushanara Ali (since 2010) in the House of Commons of the UK Parliament.

London overall has a directly elected, executive Mayor of London, currently Sadiq Khan with strong powers in transport, construction planning and long-term strategies. The mayor is scrutinised, and can be steered by the London Assembly; both Mayor and Assembly face regular elections. Its City and East seat is held by Labour's Unmesh Desai.

Honorary figure for London

London's Lord-Lieutenant Ken Olisa can be invited as personal representative for the monarch to key ceremonies but no has public policy or active operational role. Always consulting with the departmental office or local councils before opening buildings, the role is an honorary (titular) position.

== Geography ==
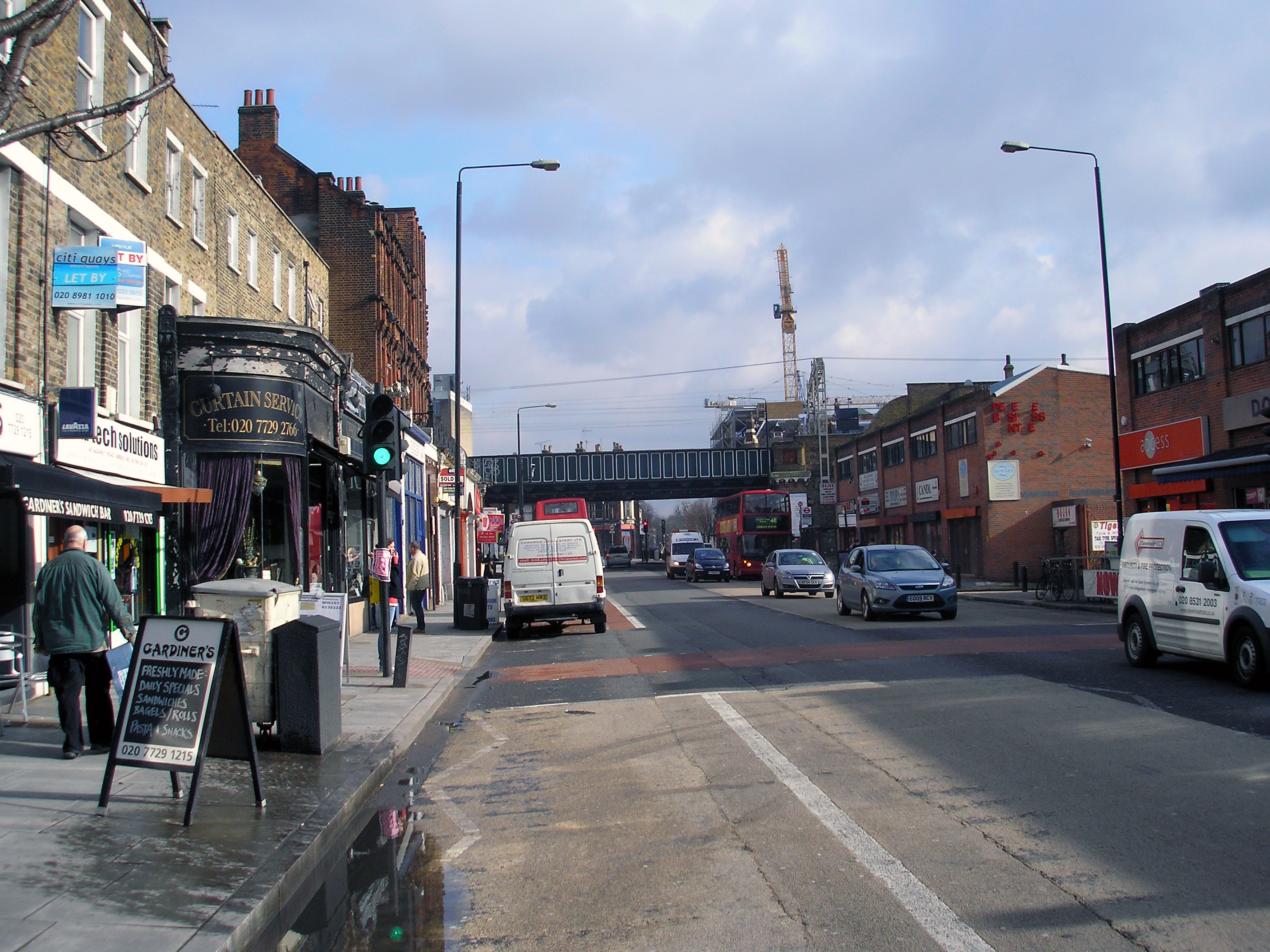
Hackney Road in 2010.

Cambridge Heath and Bethnal Green proper were unequal halves of the same manor, and in the 19th century both formed part of the Metropolitan Borough of Bethnal Green. This was incorporated into the newly created London Borough of Tower Hamlets in 1965.

It is north and west of Bethnal Green, east of Haggerston, south-west of Hackney and west of Victoria Park.

It is largely part of the wider Regents Canal Conservation Area, established in 2008, the streetside buildings seem neglected but form part of the industrial heritage and character of Vyner Street and also Wadeson Street, which contains a row of three-storey Victorian workshops mostly converted to residential use. Both types contribute to the character of the area.

== Art and memorials ==
The Wilkinson Gallery opened on Cambridge Heath Road in 1998 before moving to Vyner Street in 2007. The gallery became known as one of the first in London to have exhibitions by major female artists such as Joan Jonas, Dara Birnbaum and Laurie Simmons. However the Wilkinson Gallery closed in 2017.

By around 2005, Vyner Street had become a hub of the East London art scene. Between 2005 and 2008, the EEL (East End Life) established the Vyner Street Festival with the local Victory Pub as a family festival with local bands, artists and market traders, this has a different theme every year, with the Red Arrows performing flyover in 2008. By 2012, however, many artists had moved out due to the effects of the Great Recession as well as the 2012 Olympics. A documentary film was released in the same year titled Vyner Street: this was a short observational piece about two different worlds living inconspicuously and side by side in the same place.

The Oval Space hosted Catfest in 2018, with guests having the chance to take photos with cats as well as sample street food and meet shelter kittens.

== Filmography ==
- Gangster No. 1
- Tinker Tailor Soldier Spy
- Fast & Furious 6
- Kingsman: The Secret Service

== Religious buildings ==
St Casimir's is the earliest church for London's Lithuanian Catholics and masses are held in Lithuanian and English. It was opened by Cardinal Bourne on 10 March 1912.

In the Church of England, west of the Overground railway is the parish of St Peter; the church is on its so-named Close and one-limb, remnant square opposite Ion Square Gardens. East of the viaduct, west of Russia Lane, is the north part of the parish of St John on Bethnal Green; east of Russia Lane and Wadeson Street is St James The Less.

== Education ==
Cambridge Heath has Mowlem Primary School,

=== Martial arts ===
Jiu jitsu and other martial arts have a professionally-taught club.

== Transport ==
The neighbourhood main arterial route for motor vehicles and cyclists is the A107 Cambridge Heath Road from Mile End Gate in Stepney and Mare Street from Hackney Central which runs north–south from the two borough boundaries over the Regents Canal. Hackney Road is the main arterial road for Central London.

London Overground; Cambridge Heath railway station, opened on 27 May 1872 in the southern end of the neighbourhood, is served by Overground Enfield Town/Cheshunt-London Liverpool Street Line.

A number of London Buses contacted routes serve the area, the 26, 48, 55, N26, N55 on Hackney Road which in turn go towards Mare Street, while the 106, 254, 388, D6 and N253 run on Cambridge Heath Road and Mare Street. The D6 finishes and restarts near Ash Grove since 2014.
