= The Mall at Short Hills =

Shopping mall in New Jersey

Coordinates: 40.7405°N 74.3638°W

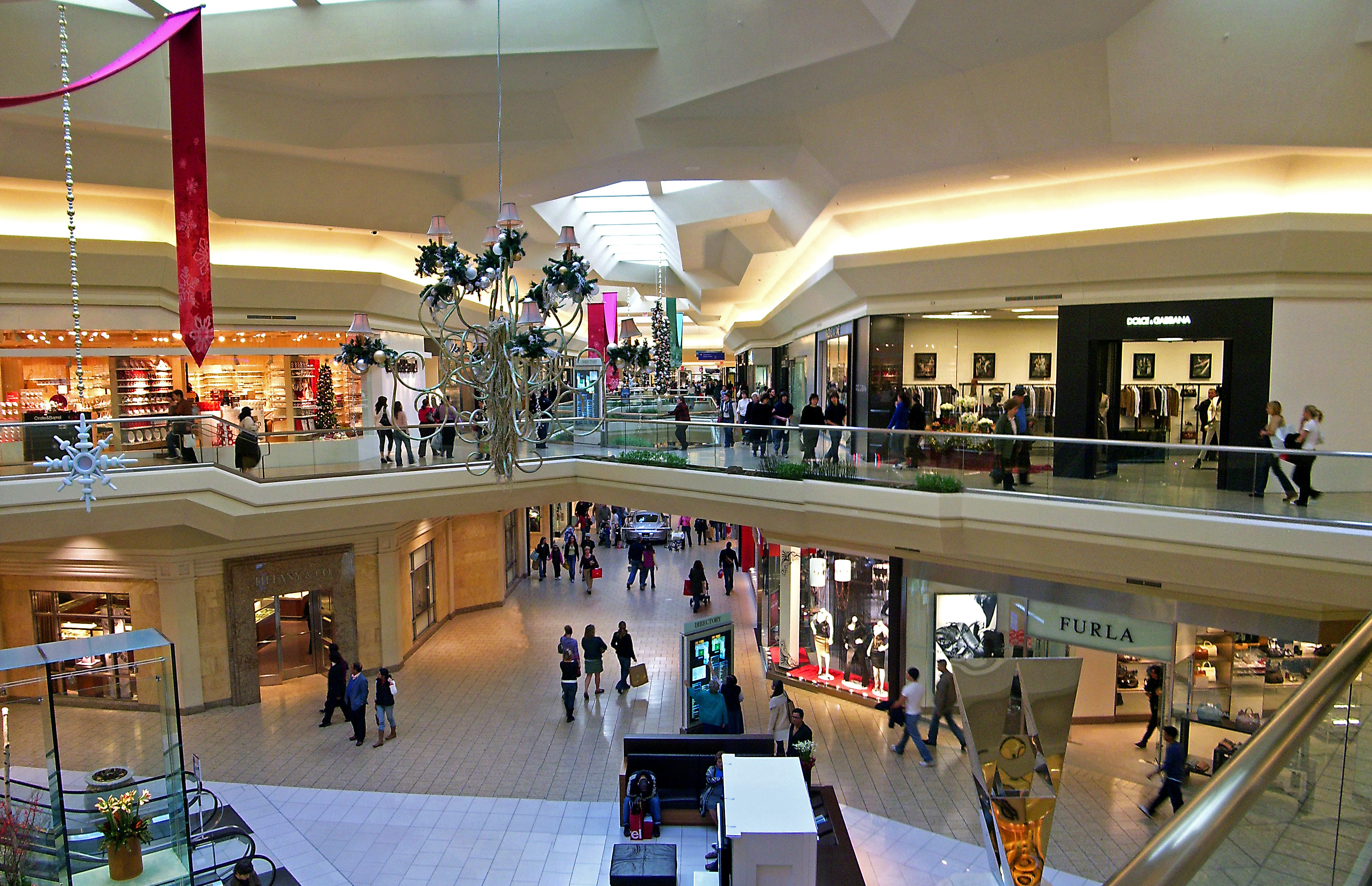
- Interior of mall near Neiman Marcus and Nordstrom
- Address: 1200 Morris Tpke, Short Hills, New Jersey, U.S.
- Opened: 1961; 65 years ago
- Developer: Prudential Insurance Company of America and The Taubman Co.
- Manager: Simon Property Group
- Owner: Simon Property Group
- Num. of stores: 160+
- Num. of anchor tenants: 9
- Floor area: 1,374,000 square feet
- Floors: 2
- Parking: Surface parking lots & multi-level parking garage
- Public transit: NJ Transit Bus: 70, 873
- Website: simon.com/mall/the-mall-at-short-hills

The Mall at Short Hills, also known as the Short Hills Mall, is a shopping mall located in the Short Hills section of Millburn, New Jersey, United States near the interchange of Route 24, JFK Parkway (CR 649), and Route 124. It is located 10 miles (16 km) west of Newark Airport and 19 miles (31 km) west of the New York City borough of Manhattan. The mall is situated near affluent communities in neighboring Morris and Union counties along the Passaic River.

The mall features Macy's, Nordstrom, Bloomingdale's, and Neiman Marcus. The mall has 150 specialty stores and restaurants. Over 40 boutiques have their only New Jersey location at the mall.

== History ==
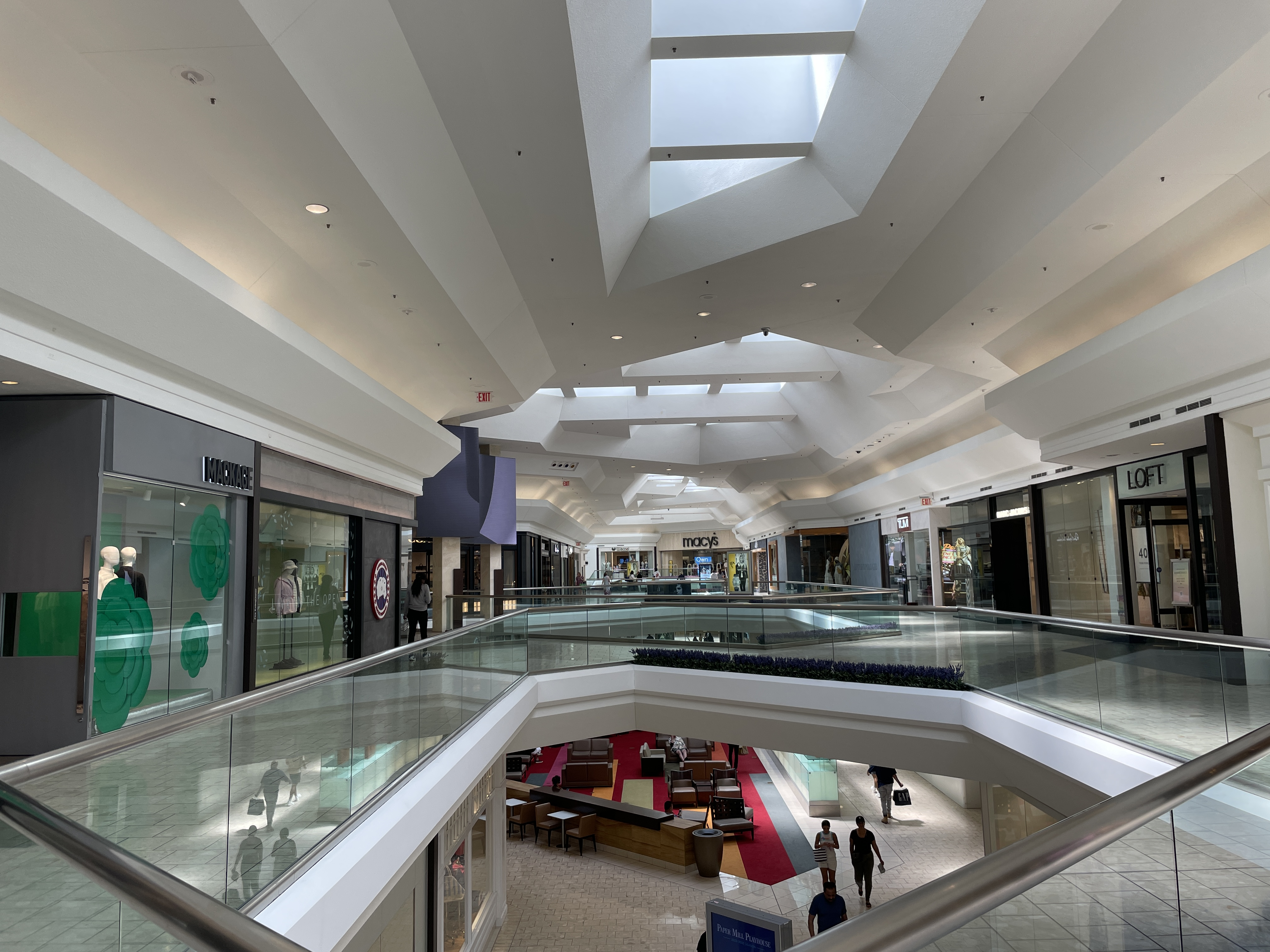
Interior of mall between Macy's and Bloomingdale's

Throughout the first half of the 20th century, the suburban community grew quickly, and local residents desired quality shopping within their local setting. Their vision began to take shape in 1949 when the Prudential Insurance Company of America acquired a large tract of land where The Mall at Short Hills and part of the Canoe Brook Country Club now sit. Seven years later, B. Altman & Company opened a 130,000-square-foot (12,000 m^{2}) store on the land and eventually added an additional 50,000 square feet (4,600 m^{2}) to meet market demands.

Local residents continued their demand for expanded retailing and in the early 1960s, a small shopping center opened. This open-air center included Bonwit Teller alongside retailers such as FAO Schwarz, Pottery Barn and Brentano's. Soon after, Bloomingdale's premiered on the site in 1967. The 243,000-square-foot (22,600 m^{2}) store included an entire floor devoted to furniture and decorative accessories.

In 1974, Prudential Insurance Company of America began working with The Taubman Company, which was The Mall at Short Hills' owner at that time. By 1980, the two organizations had completed a two-year, $100 million project to enclose the mall, which by then included 1,160,000 square feet (108,000 m^{2}) of gross leasable space and three anchor stores. New retailers included Godiva Chocolatier, Black Star and Frost, The Limited and Gap. In 1981, Abraham & Straus joined the center.

The first phase of another major expansion began in 1993 and was completed in November 1994, adding a 100,000-square-foot (9,300 m^{2}) Saks Fifth Avenue. Bloomingdale's was renovated, and Abraham & Straus became Macy's. The next expansion phase was completed in August 1995 adding two anchors—a 129,000-square-foot (12,000 m^{2}) Neiman Marcus and a 172,000-square-foot (16,000 m^{2}) Nordstrom—and many new specialty stores including Tiffany & Co., Crate & Barrel, DKNY and others.

Saks Fifth Avenue closed the Short Hills store in September 2016 in favor of a larger store at American Dream Meadowlands. It was then announced the space would be reconstructed to feature additional stores such as the U.S. debut of Indigo Books, a relocated Crate & Barrel, and Industrious, a pet-friendly, co-working office space. In the 2020s, Simon Property Group took over as the owner of the mall from Taubman.

In 2021, a viral internet meme dubbed "Victoria's Secret Karen" featured a lady (Abigail Elphick) falling to the ground and crying after she realized that she was being filmed. The incident led to a civil lawsuit that revealed that the lady lived in a complex for people with mental disabilities.
