= Vyner Street =

Coordinates: 51.5315°N 0.05566°W

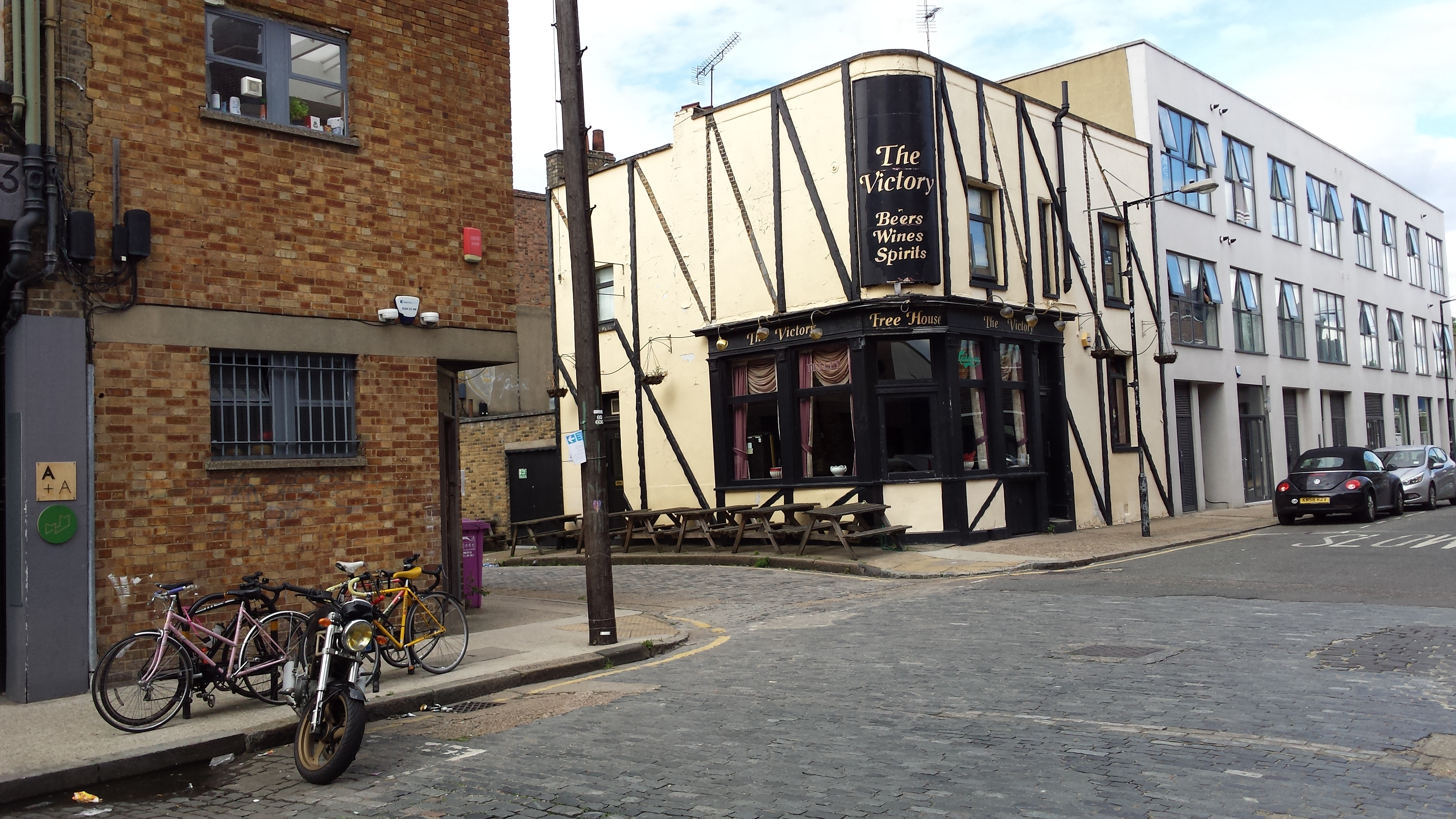
- The Victory Pub, Vyner Street

- Location within Greater London
- OS grid reference: TQ348832
- London borough: Tower Hamlets
- Ceremonial county: Greater London
- Region: London
- Country: England
- Sovereign state: United Kingdom
- Post town: LONDON
- Postcode district: E2
- Dialling code: 020
- Police: Metropolitan
- Fire: London
- Ambulance: London
- UK Parliament: Bethnal Green and Stepney
- London Assembly: City and East

Vyner Street is a cobblestone canal-side walkway in Bethnal Green in the East End of London, England. It was once called John Street in the 1830s. The street is known for its street art and for its galleries.

== History ==
The warehouse buildings rose from the Regents Canal without a towpath to interrupt development, giving direct access to the canal. On Wadeson Street, a row of Victorian workshops were built in what was a historically Jewish area. This became very overcrowded with 572 inhabitants living in 125 houses by the 1930s. The stretch was then redeveloped with warehouses and factories by 1937.

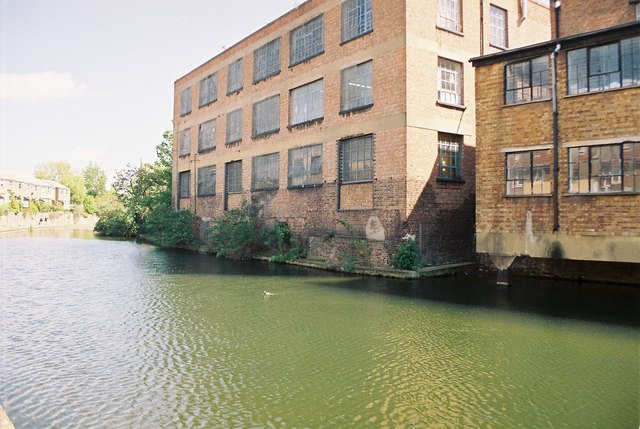
Industrial buildings next to the Regents Canal behind Vyner Street in 2005.

Vyner Street had been transformed into a hub of the East London art scene by 2005.

The Wilkinson Gallery opened on Cambridge Heath Road in 1998 and moved into Vyner Street in 2007. The gallery became known as one of the first in London to have exhibitions by major female artists such as Joan Jonas, Dara Birnbaum, and Laurie Simmons.

From 2005 to 2008 the EEL promoted and organised the Vyner Street Festival with the Victory Pub. This was a two-day family festival featuring local bands, artists and market traders with a different theme each year, with the Royal Air Force Red Arrows performing an impromptu flyover in 2008.

By 2012, many local residents and workers had moved out due to the effects of the Great Recession and the impact of the 2012 Olympics. A documentary film titled Vyner Street was released in the same year as a short observational piece chronicling the two different worlds living side by side in the same street.

By 2017, Amanda and Anthony Wilkinson said they were dissolving their partnership for personal reasons and thus closing Wilkinson Gallery. Nevertheless, commercial galleries were starting to make a return, with the Stuart Shave Modern Art reopening in October 2017 and the Tungsten Gallery opening in January 2018. Fourthspace are working on a new studio and apartment building on Vyner Street for artists Michael Landy and Gillian Wearing. Finnish designer Heikki Salonen announced a new menswear label called Vyner Street in the same year.

== Geography ==
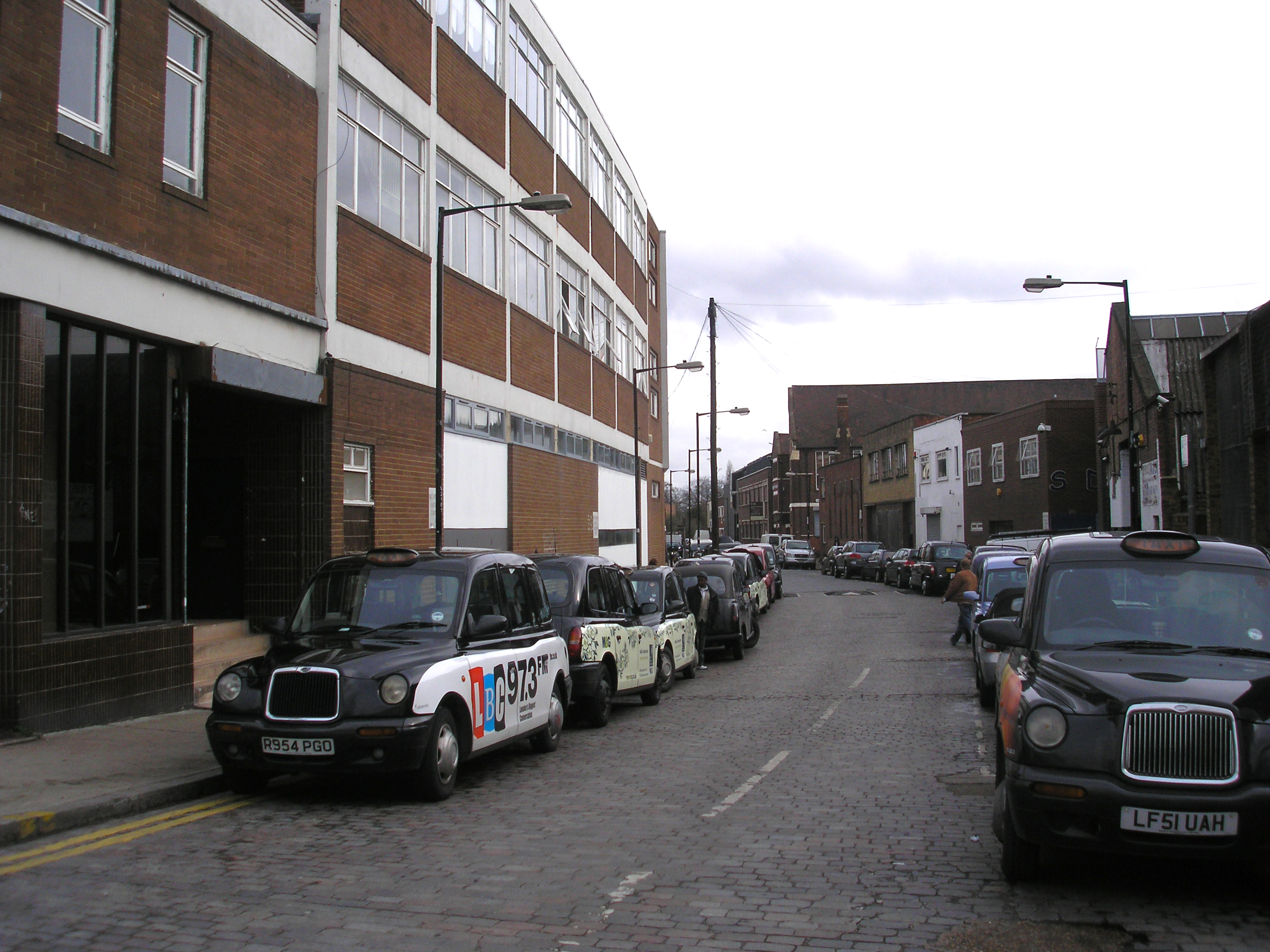
Vyner Street in 2010.

Vyner Street is part of the wider Regents Canal Conservation Area, established in 2008. To the south of Vyner Street is Wadeson Street, which contains a row of three-storey Victorian workshops mostly converted to residential use. Both types contribute to the character of the area.

== Transport ==
No London Buses routes operate in Vyner Street but some call on nearby Cambridge Heath Road and Mare Street. These include the 26, 48, 55, 106, 254, 388, D6 and night buses N26, N55 and N253. The D6 terminates near Ash Grove since 2014.
