= Telford Homes =

Home building company

Telford Homes PLC
- Company type: Private
- Industry: Housebuilding
- Founded: 2000
- Key people: Andrew Wiseman (Chairman); Jonathan Di-Stefano (CEO)
- Revenue: ▲£291.9 million (2017)
- Operating income: ▲£36.7 million (2017)
- Net income: ▲£27.5 million (2017)
- Number of employees: 248
- Parent: CBRE Group
- Website: www.telfordhomes.london

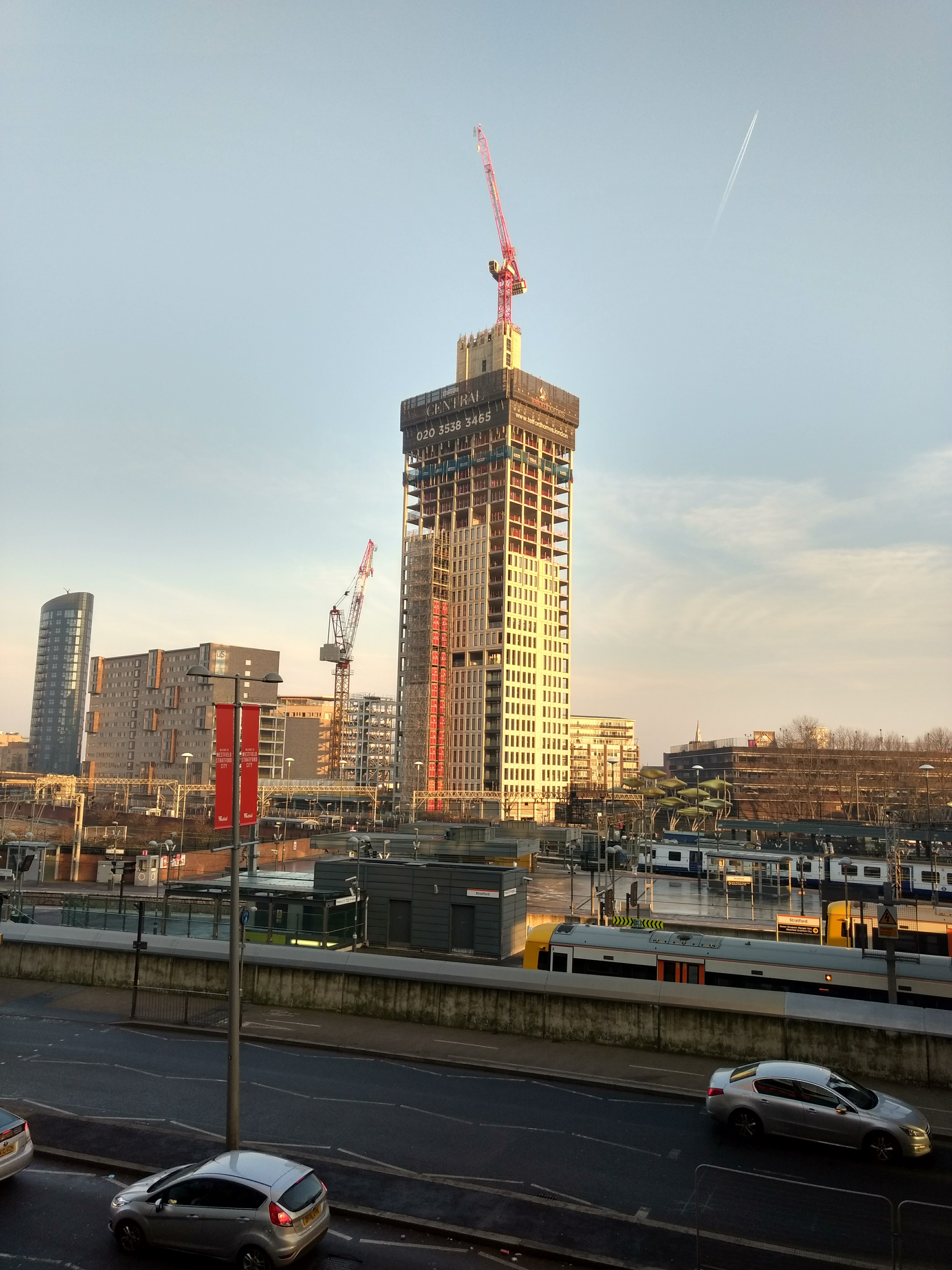
Stratford Central, a Telford Homes development, seen from Westfield Stratford City.

Telford Homes is a housebuilding company that specialises in developments in non-prime areas of London.

== History ==
During December 2001, the company was floated on the Alternative Investment Market, raising £4.4 million of investment in the process. Early on, the company largely focused its attention onto London's East End. One particular center point of its development work during the 2000s was Stratford, where the firm capitalised on a steep rise in house prices that were close to the site of the Olympics Park for the 2012 Olympic Games. In the aftermath of the Olympics, Telford Homes continued to invest into Stratford locations.

The company was negatively impacted by the Great Recession, which caused a dip in house prices and Telford Homes' valuation to drop to 20p per share; however, it was not at risk of ceasing operations, with a rise in profits being recorded during December 2008. The firm's response to the wider economic downturn was to refrain from investing into new land as well as decreasing the completion rate of its open market homes to a below-capacity rate; an increased focus on affordable housing and selling to organisations such as housing associations was also pursued.

Furthermore, the company was in a good enough fiscal position that it was able to purchase other companies as early as mid 2009. The firm continued to record profits during most years, such as a pre-tax profit of £7.3 million in 2010. During June 2011, Andrew Wiseman stepping down as chief executive of Telford Homes and subsequently became the firm's executive chairman while the business' former finance director Jon Di-Stefano was appointed as chief executive.

The mid-2010s were a particularly lucrative time for the company. In April 2012, it was reported that a better-than-expected pre-tax profit had been recorded amid increased sales and completions. During the summer of 2013, the firm issued eight million shares in order to raise roughly £20 million in funding for its development activities; later that same year, Telford Homes announced that its plan to double in size over the following five years. In May 2014, it was reported that year-on-year profits had roughly doubled. In 2015, Telford Homes' recorded a profit of £25.1 million, which was up tenfold from four years prior, while the firm's value had risen from £20 million to £250 million.

During 2015, roughly 85 per cent of the firm's customers were investors, roughly half of which were from overseas. That same year, it purchased United House Developments' interest in four London-based development sites in exchange for £23 million. During 2016, Telford Homes stated that its development pipeline had a value in excess of £1.5 billion.

In 2017, in response to high demand from people across London that were struggling to get on the property ladder, the firm announced that it would orientate towards building additional homes for the rental market rather than owner-occupier properties. During April 2018, it was reported that Telford Homes was expecting record profits and revenues for the financial year 2017/18; this performance was partially attributed to London’s housing shortage. In February 2019, the firm sold an east London site to Greystar in exchange for £105 million.

In June 2019, it was announced that the firm would build almost 900 homes at Nine Elms Park in Battersea under a £280 million deal. That same month, it was announced that the American real estate investment and development firm CBRE Group had submitted a bid valued at £267.4 million to acquire Telford Homes and that the price had met with the approval of the firm's directors. Four months later, the acquisition was completed.

During June 2022, it was announced that outsider Anne Kavanagh had been appointed as Telford Homes' chief executive following the departure of John Di-Stefano. In October 2023, it recorded a pre-tax loss of £193 million after the firm was impacted by building safety writedowns and losses related to its conversion of the listed Balfron Tower in east London.
