= Sigma3 =

SIGMA 3 (North Sea) Ltd was a joint venture between Wood Group Engineering (North Sea), AMEC, and PSN (formerly KBR, a Halliburton Company) set up as the Integrated Services Contractor on behalf of Shell Expro in the North Sea. The company was established in October 2001 (under the name Offshore Integrated Services Ltd), and dissolved in March 2018.
