= London Fields =

Coordinates: 51.541104°N 0.059545°W

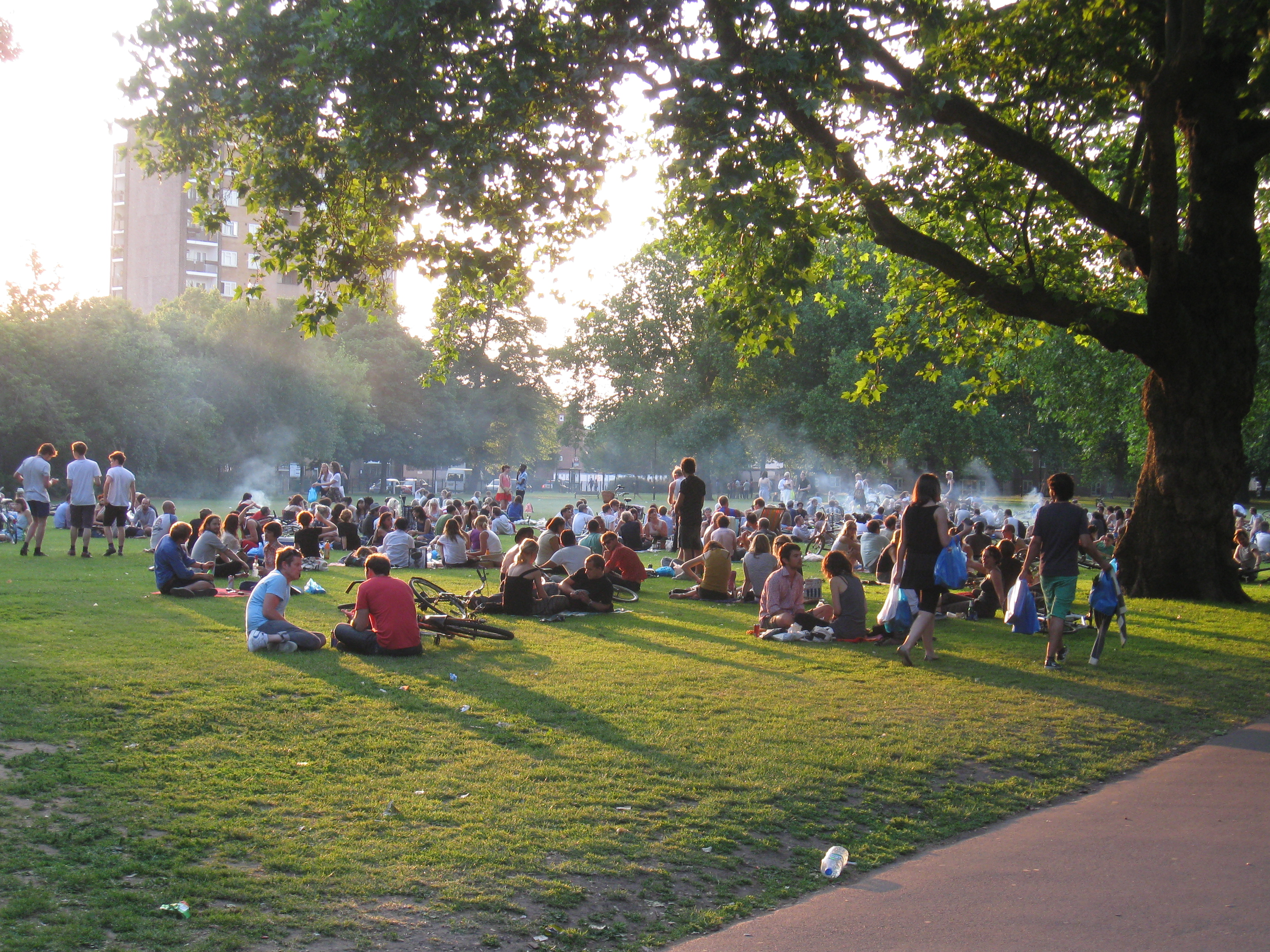

- Location within Greater London
- London borough: Hackney
- Ceremonial county: Greater London
- Region: London
- Country: England
- Sovereign state: United Kingdom
- Post town: LONDON
- Postcode district: E8
- Dialling code: 020
- Police: Metropolitan
- Fire: London
- Ambulance: London
- UK Parliament: Hackney South and Shoreditch
- London Assembly: North East

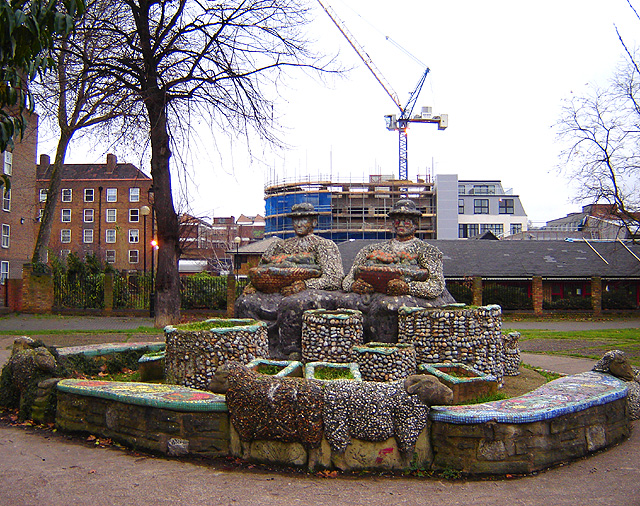
The sculpture Flower Sellers

London Fields is a park in Hackney, London, although the name also refers to the immediate area in Hackney surrounding it and London Fields station. It is common land adjoining the Hackney Central area of the London Borough of Hackney. The park covers an area of 12.65 hectares (31.3 acres), and includes sporting and recreation facilities. The park's history is recorded as early as the 13th century, and it has been known as London Fields since the mid-16th century.

== History ==
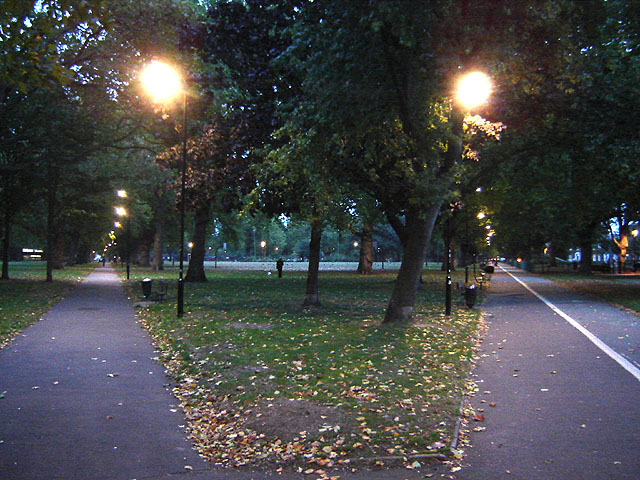
London Fields at twilight; the bicycle path on the right leads to the Pub on the Park (October 2005)

In 1275, the area now known as London Fields was recorded as common pasture land adjoining Cambridge Heath.

The park was first recorded by name in 1540; in the singular as 'London Field'. Still common ground, it was used by drovers to pasture their livestock before taking them to market in London. By the late 19th century the name had become pluralised to 'London Fields' and parts of the Fields were being lost to piecemeal development. There was a threat of comprehensive development of the park in 1860 but this threat was averted.

During the Second World War the park hosted an anti-aircraft battery in the south-west corner (the tarmac is still visible under the grass) and a bomb shelter in the vicinity of the tennis courts.

The area was heavily bombed during the Blitz and houses along the northern and eastern edges of the park were among those destroyed. These houses had been built on land that was originally part of London Fields and the land was subsequently restored to the park. The previous boundary is marked by a wide arc of Plane trees.

== Sport and facilities ==
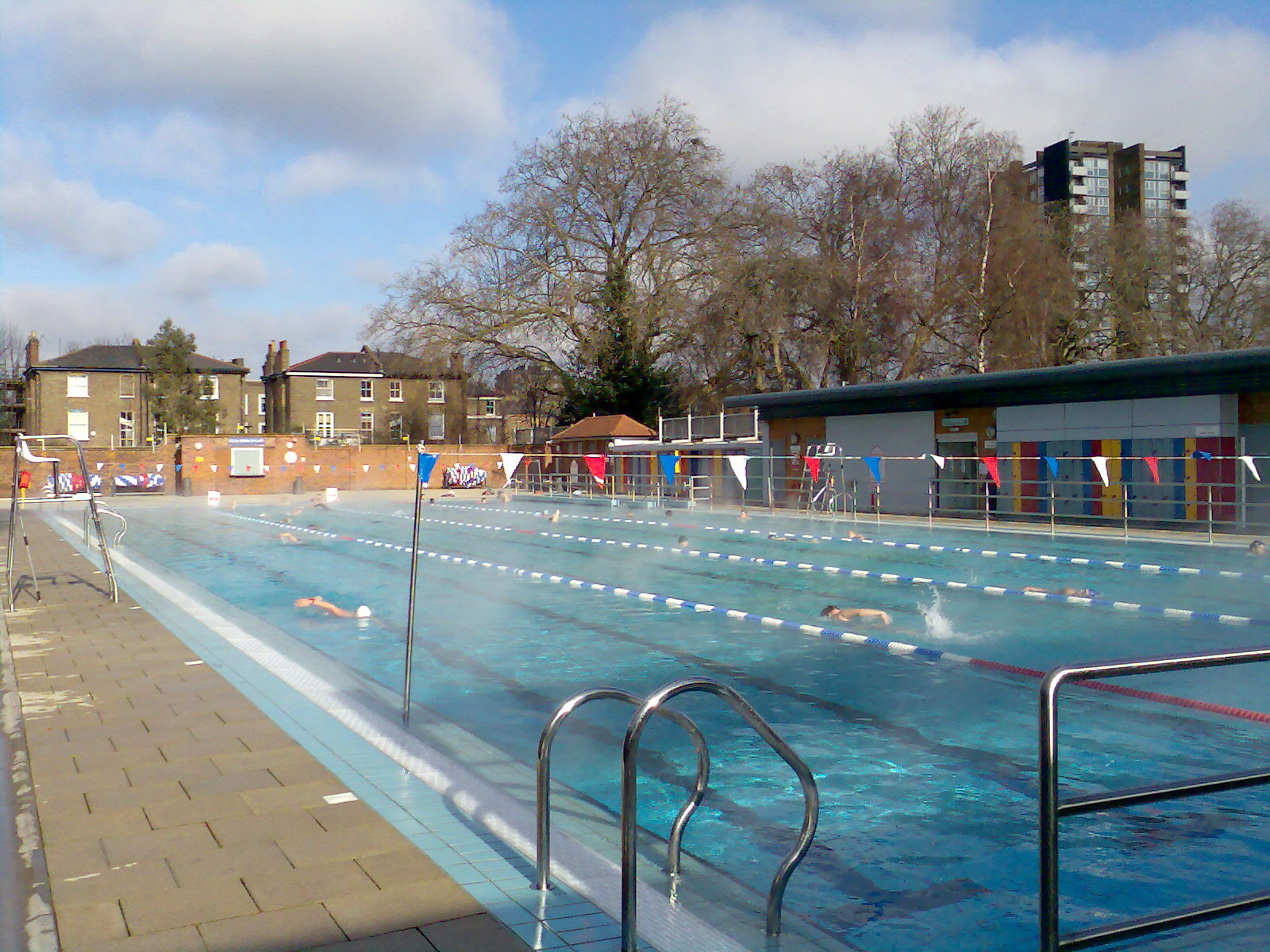
London Fields Lido

London Fields features a cricket pitch, a heated 50m lido and lido cafe, grass areas, a small BMX track, tennis courts, a table tennis table, toilet blocks and two children's play areas. In 2013 the Council turned a sandy, gritty area of London Fields into a pictorial meadow the size of a football pitch.

There is a public house called the Pub on the Park on the east side of the park; this was opened in 1855. It was formerly known as the Queen Eleanor until 1992.

London Fields received a Green Flag award in July 2008. A much-used cycle path runs from the Pub on the Park to Broadway Market.

A document in Hackney library records a game of cricket to have been played on the park as early as 1802, and the cricket square on London Fields continues to host competitive games throughout the summer (late April – mid September). Several teams use the park as their home pitch, most notably London Fields CC, based at the Pub on the Park. During the summer the park can be extremely busy with many people combining an afternoon's picnic with watching the cricket. The Turley End of the ground is a popular vantage point for those watching the cricket.

The park is used as the starting point for an annual night-time cycle ride called the Dunwich Dynamo.

The park is a training and competition base for Hackney Aquatics Club, the London Fields Triathlon Club and Team London Fields Running Club.

== Crime ==
The area has been connected with instances of gun crime. Members of the London Fields gang which operates in and around the area were convicted on 12 April 2011 for the shooting of 16-year-old Agnes Sina-Inakoju at a chicken shop in Hoxton in April 2010. There have been multiple accidental bystander shootings including 2010 and 2019. In August 2022, a man was shot at close range while sitting in his vehicle at the junction of Shrubland Road and Albion Drive, roughly 100 meters from the parks east entrance. On 10 August and 11 August 2023, two consecutive shootings took place at London Fields Lido and Stoke Newington High Street, in the second incident a man suffered a gunshot injury to the arm and was taken to hospital. On 14 November 2024, a man was doused in a corrosive substance suspected to be bleach in an attack at the Broadway Market.

== Governance ==
The surrounding area to the west has, since 2014, formed part of a new London Fields electoral ward, electing three councillors to Hackney Council.

== Education ==
There is also a primary school named after the area, London Fields Primary School, opposite one of the south entrances to London Fields park. There is also a second primary school, Gayhurst Primary School, located by London Fields Lido opposite one of the western entrances to the park.

== Housing ==
The area includes several housing estates. One of the largest, the Holly Street Estate, is undergoing regeneration, and the new development by United House won Apartment Building of the Year at the Daily Mail British Homes Awards in 2009. During the 1950s much of the original Georgian and Victorian housing stock in the area had been intended for demolition as part of a plan to remove what was considered slum housing. Due to a successful legal challenge made by some of the local residents, most of the planned demolitions were prevented and it is this housing stock that principally makes up what is now London Field Conservation Area.

== Transport ==
London Fields railway station is a London Overground station close to the park which links the area to Liverpool Street in the City.
