= Flexcom =

Finite element analysis software

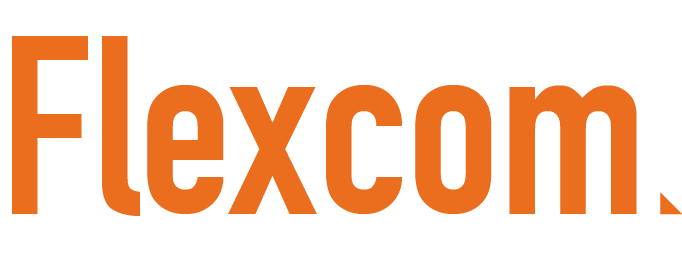

- Flexcom 8.3.2 running on Windows 7
- Developer: John Wood Group
- Stable release: 2026.1.1 / May 18, 2026; 0 days ago
- Operating system: Microsoft Windows
- Type: Finite element analysis
- License: Proprietary commercial software
- Website: www.woodgroup.com/flexcom

Flexcom is a finite element analysis software package used in the offshore oil and gas, offshore wind and marine renewable energy industries. A free educational version is also available for universities.

Flexcom should be distinguished from Flexcom Company Limited, a Korean flexible printed circuit board manufacturer.

== History ==
Flexcom was originally developed by a small start-up company, Marine Computation Services, founded at University College Galway in 1983. Nowadays it is managed by Wood Group. The name derives from its origins as a computational software initially geared towards the analysis of flexible risers, befitting the emerging riser technology of the North Sea in the early 1980s. Although originally a time domain analysis tool only, it also incorporates frequency domain and modal analysis capabilities. The first version was released circa 1985, and a continuous update program has been maintained since then.

Subsea mid-water arch modelled by Flexcom

Dropped riser modelled by Flexcom

Stiesdal TetraSpar modelled by Flexcom

Version	Release
1.1	1985?
2.1	1990?
3.1	1995
4.1	1997
5.1	1998
6.1	2002
7.1	2004
7.3	2007
7.7	2008
7.9	2009
8.1	2011
8.2	2013
8.3	2014
8.4	2015
8.6	2016
8.10	2018
8.13	2021
2022.1	2022
2025.1	2025
2026.1	2026

== Applications ==
Typical applications include:

- Subsea production systems
- Steel catenary risers
- Drilling risers
- Mooring lines
- Submarine pipelines
- Offshore pipe-laying
- Floating offshore wind turbines
- Wave energy converters

== Solution methodology ==
=== Beam element ===
Flexcom uses a specialised finite element formulation, incorporating a hybrid Euler–Bernoulli beam-column element with fully coupled axial, bending and torque forces, well suited to the modelling of slender offshore structures such as risers, mooring lines, pipes, cables etc. Up to 10 integration points are used within each finite element to ensure a precise distribution of applied forces. Third order shape functions are used to predict solution variable (e.g. moment, curvature) variations within each element. Flexcom uses a consistent mass formulation which integrates the mass along the length of each finite element, consistent with the fundamental principles of the finite element method, stiffness matrix assembly and shape functions. This results in a fully populated mass matrix with off-diagonal terms that include coupling terms between different degrees of freedom and different nodes, and represents a complete numerical definition of the structural mass in reality. A consistent mass definition is important for implicit time domain solvers which simulate dynamic structures, and is particularly important in accurately capturing rotational inertia effects.

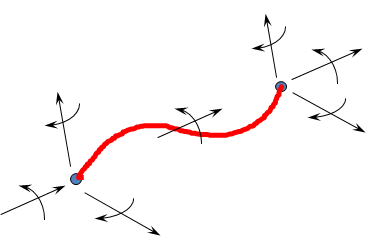
Flexcom Beam-Column Element

Like traditional beam elements, Flexcom’s beam includes displacements and rotations at its two end nodes, resulting in 12 active degrees of freedom per element. For a numerical solver to be capable of analysing both flexible materials (such as mooring wires, power cables etc.), and inflexible structures (such as the rigid columns and pontoons of a floating platform), a solution scheme is required which caters for bending stiffness values which are much lower than corresponding axial stiffness values. To achieve this effect, axial force is explicitly included as a solution variable, which is solved for independently of the axial strain. The stress-strain compatibility relationship is applied outside of the virtual work statement by means of a Lagrangian constraint. Torque is handled in a similar manner, which leads to a 14 degree of freedom hybrid finite element with two end nodes, where the axial force and torque are added to the usual form of a three-dimensional beam-column element.

Floating bodies typically undergo significant rigid body motions when subjected to ocean waves, so the numerical solver must also cater for arbitrarily large and non-linear displacements and rotations in three dimensions. This is a key aspect of the structural model which is necessary to ensure accurate modelling of the restoring forces such as effective tension and bending moment. The solver uses a convected coordinate technique to cater for large three-dimensional displacements and rotations. Each element of the finite element discretisation has a local axis system associated with it, which moves with the element as it moves in space and time. The internal and external virtual work statements are written in the convected system, and deformations along the element relative to this system are assumed to be moderate.

=== Truss element ===
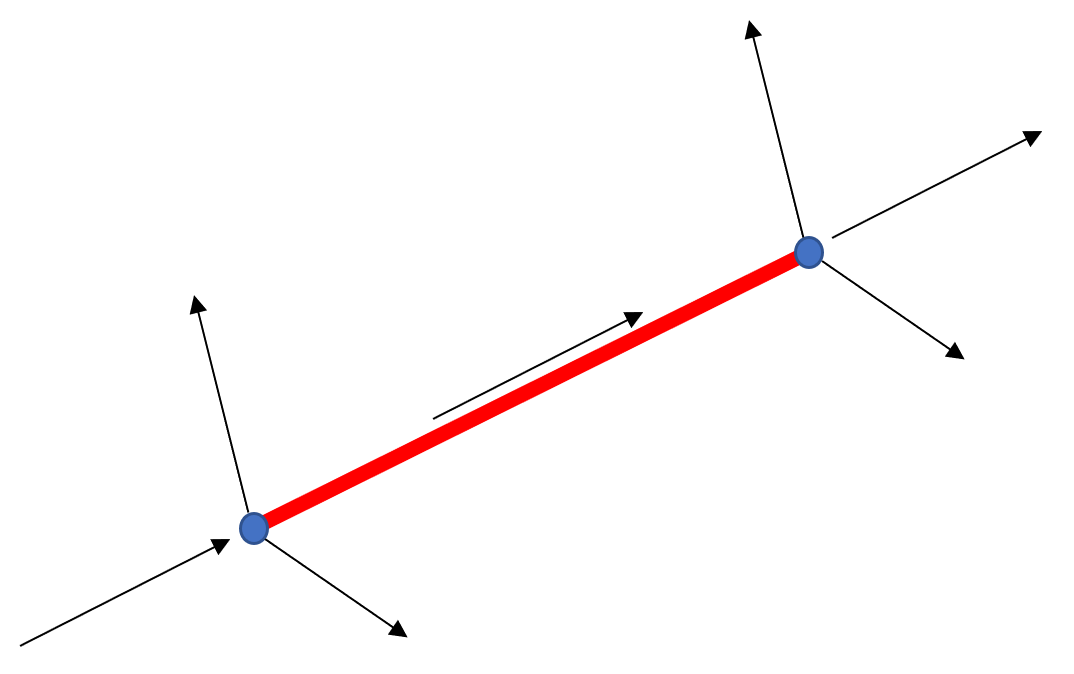
Flexcom Truss Element

A truss element was added in 2022. It is designed specifically for modelling structures which have very low levels of structural bending stiffness (such as mooring chains) and is essentially a simplified version of the beam element. Code-to-code comparisons have shown the truss element to be numerically accurate, dynamically robust and computational efficient.

=== Hydrodynamic model ===
Hydrodynamic loading on the beam elements is based on Morison's equation. Morison's equation is widely established in marine engineering for modelling wave forces on slender offshore structures such as oil and gas export lines and mooring lines. In situations where the body size becomes significant with respect to wavelength, the underlying assumptions become invalid, and the effects of radiation and diffraction must also be considered.

Hydrodynamic loading on larger bodies is based on the application of potential theory. Dedicated hydrodynamic modelling packages such as WAMIT solve the velocity potential using a boundary integral equation method, and provide hydrodynamic coefficients which may be subsequently used as inputs by Flexcom. This provides a more detailed model than Morison's equation, and includes wave excitation forces (due to the pressure acting on a still vessel), diffraction forces (caused by disturbances of the wave field due to the presence of the vessel), and radiation damping forces (representing waves caused by oscillations of the vessel itself). Flexcom uses a convolution technique to integrate frequency-dependent added mass and radiation damping terms into the time domain simulation.

=== Aerodynamic model ===
Modern versions of Flexcom include a software coupling with OpenFAST, enabling the simulation of offshore wind turbines. OpenFAST is an open source modelling tool developed by the National Laboratory of the Rockies (formerly NREL).

== Validation ==
Flexcom has been validated over many years via comparisons with other software, analytical solutions and other published work. Sample publications are listed below.

Turret disconnect modelled by Flexcom

Colliding object modelled by Flexcom

Tower crane modelled by Flexcom

Oil and Gas

- Mooring lines (floating wind turbine with heavy steel chain mooring, weather buoy with light polyester rope mooring)
- Flexible risers (with bending hysteresis)
- Steel catenary risers (with nonlinear flex joints)
- Floating bodies (coupled analysis)
- Rigid spools (with fluid flow and slugging)
- Pipe-laying (stinger contact modelling)

Renewable Energy

- NREL 5MW reference wind turbine hosted by a floating semi-submersible
- NREL 5MW reference wind turbine hosted by a fixed steel jacket
- Siemens Gamesa 3.6MW wind turbine hosted by a prototype version of the Stiesdal TetraSpar floater
- NREL 22MW reference wind turbine
- Point absorber wave energy converter
- Dual-body point absorber wave energy converter

== See also ==
- List of finite element software packages
