= John Wood Group =

British multinational engineering and consulting company

John Wood Group Ltd.
- Type: Limited
- Industry: Energy and Materials
- Founded: 1982; 44 years ago
- Founder: Ian Wood
- Headquarters: Aberdeen, Scotland, UK
- Key people: Neil Bruce (Chief Executive Officer)
- Products: Engineering and consulting
- Revenue: ▼US$5,489.5 million (2024)
- Operating income: ▼US$8.1 million (2024)
- Net income: ▼US$(2,772.3) million (2024)
- Number of employees: 35,000 (2025)
- Parent: Sidara
- Website: www.woodgroup.com

John Wood Group Ltd, commonly known as Wood Group, is a British multinational engineering and consulting business with headquarters in Aberdeen, Scotland. Listed on the London Stock Exchange until May 2025, the group employed 35,000 people globally, before being acquired by Dubai-based engineering and design firm Sidara.

== History ==
The business was founded in 1982 by Ian Wood, when it split away from JW Holdings, the largest fishing company in Scotland. Ian played a pivotal role in the management and direction of the company, being its chief executive officer (CEO) through to 2006 as well as its chairman through to 2012. From the 1980s through to the end of the 2000s, the Wood family held (via a series of charities and trusts) a sizable stake in the business, at one point as high as 40 percent of all available shares, giving them considerable sway over decision-making.

From the onset of its operations, the company benefited greatly from a decision made by JW Holdings to diversify into the energy services business at the outset of the North Sea oil industry in the early 1970s.

In September 2000, John Wood Group acquired the Texas-based oil rig business Mustang Engineering Inc. for $137.5 million. Prior to the purchase, the business employed 6,000 staff worldwide while the purchase Mustang Engineering Inc, which was renamed Wood Group Mustang, added another 1,200 employees. Post-purchase, the entity has continued to operate as a subsidiary of John Wood Group.

During 2002, following several years of speculation that the company would do so, John Wood Group was listed on the London Stock Exchange.

In 2011, the company sold off its well support division to General Electric (GE) in exchange for $2.8 billion (£1.73 billion); it also conducted unsuccessful negotiations with GE over prospective co-operation on its gas turbine business as well. That same year, the Wood family reduced their 11 percent stake in John Wood Group to 1 percent in exchange for £366 million.

During 2012, John Wood Group started providing environmental consultancy work to relation to Heathrow Airport's proposed expansion. The company has also been involved in other transport infrastructure schemes, such as the potential reopening of the Watford and Rickmansworth Railway.

In 2016, John Wood Group expanded its footprint in the North Sea oil sector through the purchase of the Aberdeen-based business Enterprise Engineering shortly after it had entered administration.

In March 2017, the company announced it would acquire its rival, Amec Foster Wheeler, in an all stock deal, valued at approximately £2.2 billion. Following approval from the Competition and Markets Authority, the transaction was completed on 9 October 2017. In the months following the transaction, John Wood Group opted to sell off some of the recently acquired portions of Amec Foster Wheeler, including its North Sea oil & gas interests and its North American nuclear operation.

During the 2010s, John Wood Group was involved in the design and construction of several civil nuclear power stations across the UK. In 2020, the company's nuclear division, including its decommissioning work at Sellafield, was sold to the American conglomerate Jacobs Engineering Group in exchange for £250 million. The proceeds of the sale were stated to by used to reduce company debt and support its increasing focus on growing areas like renewables.

In February 2022, John Wood Group announced that it would make a loss of approximately US$222million on an Aegis Ballistic Missile Defense System facility for the United States Army Corps of Engineers.

During June 2022, the company announced the sale of its built environment consulting business to WSP Global Inc in exchange for approximately US$1.9billion.

In April 2023, the American private equity firm Apollo Global Management, following four rejected bids to do so, walked away from negotiations to take over John Wood Group. During May 2024, the company rejected a £1.4bn takeover offer made by the Dubai-based engineering and design firm Sidara, which “fundamentally undervalued” the company.

In February 2025, the company's chief financial officer Arvind Balan resigned his position after his professional qualifications had been 'misstated'. In May 2025, the company's shares were suspended from listing on the London Stock Exchange after it failed to file financial statements on time. In November 2025, it was announced that Wood plc would be acquired by Sidara, for £0.2 billion. The takeover was completed in March 2026.

In December 2025, it was announced Wood had agreed to sell its UK Transmission & Distribution business to United Infrastructure for £57.5 million as part of its ongoing divestment of non-core operations.

The company was fined £13 million by the Financial Conduct Authority in March 2026 for repeatedly publishing inaccurate accounts.

== Operations ==
Wood provides consultation, management of assets and engineering services for the energy and materials sector.

== See also ==
- List of oilfield service companies
- Sigma3 (2001–2018)
- Flexcom, finite element analysis software developed by the John Wood Group for the energy industry
