= United House Developments =

Property developer in London, England

- Company type: Private
- Industry: Housebuilding
- Founded: 1964
- Headquarters: Southampton Street, London UK
- Key people: Stephen Halbert, Chairman; Jeffrey Adams, Group Chief Executive
- Website: www.unitedhousedevelopments.net

United House Developments (formerly Modern City Living) is a property development and housebuilding company based in Southampton Street, London. It is active in the construction of social housing, urban regeneration, refurbishment and Public Private Partnerships (PPP).

It was originally formed as Harp Heating in 1964. The company's founder, Geoffrey Granter, maintained a leading role at the company throughout the 20th century. Initially focused on installing central heating into occupied council housing, the firm formed partnerships with various entities during the 1970s that fuelled its growth into larger projects. In the 1980s, it formally branched out into new-builds, rebranded as United House, and relocated to Swanley. A dedicated development division, Modern City Living, was created in 1990. That decade, United House grew considerably via a series of Private Finance Initiative (PFI) initiatives, under which it quickly became a major PFI housing contractor.

During 2008, Modern City Living was rebranded United House Developments. Two years later, Lloyds Development Capital (LDC) purchased a minority stake in the firm; further expansion, focused on inner city private housebuilding opportunities, was financed via loans from Royal Bank of Scotland (RBS). During the early 2010s, the company prioritised its new-build projects over refurbishment work. In late 2014, a substantial restructuring of United House Group was undertaken; specifically, its construction business (United House Ltd) merged with Bullock Construction to create United Living Group while United House Developments, became a separate firm oriented towards development.

== History ==
The origins of the company can be traced back to the establishment of Harp Heating by Geoffrey Granter in 1964. Initially, its core business was the installation of central heating systems in council housing while the tenants remained in occupation. During the 1970s, Harp Heating broadened its service range via partnerships to undertake larger internal refurbishment projects, such as for the Greater London Council (GLC) operating from its 100,000 sq ft warehouse adjacent to the head office at Swanley. By the end of the 1970s, the firm was exploring the potential of not only further housing refurbishment schemes but working on new-build construction as well.

During the early 1980s, Harp Heating was rebranded as United House and relocated into the current headquarters in Swanley. Michael Rayfield was the company's joint managing director and shareholder until his death in 1984. In 1982, Jeffrey Adams joined the company, becoming its joint owner alongside Granter. Around this time, United House expanded into the housebuilding and house refurbishment sectors. During 1990, a development division, branded Modern City Living, was established.

Throughout the 1990s, United House gained substantial business under the Private Finance Initiative (PFI) linked to the Decent Homes Programme, and building of new social under the Labour government. Adopting a renewed focus on partnerships, and seeking to expand its presence in the PFI/PPP sector, a new division, United House Solutions, was founded in 1997. United House became a major PFI housing contractor in Britain, managing some 7,000 homes.

In the 2000s, the company became the first contractor to form a strategic partnership with a local authority (Portsmouth City Council) in the housing sector. It also developed an NVQ Level 2 in Housing in conjunction with Hackney College, which was the first qualification of its kind in Britain. During 2008, Modern City Living was rebranded United House Developments. Various management changes were also made not long after this rebranding; chiefly, Granter stepped down from active involvement in the business while Steven Halbert joined the company's board as chairman.

During August 2009, despite the 2008 financial crisis and the Great Recession, the firm recorded a turnover of £190 million, a 61% increase year-on-year. During April 2010, Lloyds Development Capital (LDC) purchased a minority stake in United House while Royal Bank of Scotland (RBS) provided bank loans to fund further expansion in inner city private housebuilding.

In September 2010, United House announced record-breaking fiscal results for the previous year, chiefly that its recorded pre-tax profits had more than doubled. One year later, revenue increased to £239 million, a 19 percent rise, while profit sharply rose by 76 percent to £15.3 million. During the early 2010s, the company sought to pivot towards favouring its new-build projects over its traditional refurbishment activities; it also sought to decrease the amount of construction work performed on behalf of other private sector developers.

On 16 September 2014, a substantial restructuring of United House Group was announced. United House's construction business (United House Ltd) merged with Bullock Construction, which was also owned by LDC and has a similar profile to United House, but worked in other areas of the UK. The new construction company was called United Living Group, and Bullock's CEO Ian Burnett become the group's chief executive. Later that year, United House Developments, headed by Adams as chairman and Rick de Blaby as CEO, became a separate development company, based in London.

During September 2015, the firm sold its interest in four London-based development sites in London to Telford Homes in exchange for £23 million.

== Awards ==
The company has won many awards including:

- Daily Mail British Homes Awards 2009 Apartment Building of the Year for Queensbridge Quarter in London Fields, Hackney
- 2010 Development of the Year for Arundel Square, Islington
- Daily Telegraph British Homes Awards 2011 for the housing project at Clapham One

== Notable projects ==
The company carried out the conversion of Frobisher Crescent at the Barbican, the original location of the Cass Business School, into residential use. It was also involved in the Central St Giles mixed-use development in Covent Garden.

United House constructed the Clapham One development in Clapham High Street for Cathedral Group in 2012 under a public–private partnership (PPP) with the London Borough of Lambeth.

In 2013, it completed work on a mixed-use development, involving 388 social homes plus office and retail space, at Hale Village in Tottenham. Around the end of 2013, the company completed the Paynes & Borthwick riverside development at West Greenwich.
