= Industrious =

American provider of coworking spaces

- Company type: Division
- Industry: Coworking and workplace experience
- Founded: 2012; 14 years ago
- Founder: Jamie Hodari and Justin Stewart
- Headquarters: New York City
- Area served: U.S., Europe, and Asia
- Services: Coworking spaces
- Owner: CBRE Group
- Website: www.industriousoffice.com

Industrious is a workplace experience company headquartered in New York City, that provides coworking and creates flexible office spaces for companies and individuals. It was founded in 2012 and operates in more than 200 locations and 65 cities in the U.S., Canada, Europe, and Asia.

== History ==
Industrious was founded in 2012 by Jamie Hodari and Justin Stewart, childhood friends from Michigan who sought to improve the quality of shared office spaces. The company raised $1 million from 80 investors to open its first location in Chicago in 2013. It expanded into New York City in 2015 with a Brooklyn site and later relocated its headquarters to Manhattan.

In March 2017, the company raised $25 million. In August 2019, the company raised $80 million in Series D funding from Brookfield Property Partners, Canada Pension Plan, TF Cornerstone, Granite Properties, and Equinox Group.

In February 2021, CBRE Group invested $200 million in Industrious and contributed its 10 Hana coworking locations in exchange for a 35% stake in the company. In May 2022, CBRE invested an additional $100 million.

In 2022, first Canadian location opened, and as of 2026 Industrious operates two co-working locations in Toronto, Canada.

On January 14, 2025, CBRE announced an agreement to acquire the remaining 60% of Industrious it did not already own, valuing the company at about $800 million.

=== Partnerships ===
Industrious partners with Equinox Group to provide locations near gyms and offer gym memberships as perks to members.

It has a partnership with Wythe Hotel to use hotel rooms as office spaces.

In September 2020, the company announced a partnership with Cushman & Wakefield to provide amenities in properties managed by Cushman & Wakefield.

In September 2022, the company announced a partnership with AvalonBay Communities to open locations in apartment complexes.

=== Acquisitions ===
In March 2017, Industrious acquired PivotDesk, a digital flexible workplace platform.

In May 2019, it acquired TechSpace, an office space provider for tech-related companies.

== Notable locations ==
- One Arts Plaza in Dallas
- Scottsdale Fashion Square
- The Mall at Short Hills
- Broadway Plaza in Walnut Creek
- Carnegie Hall Tower
- Willis Tower
