= Pinstripes (restaurant) =

American restaurant chain

- Interactive map of Pinstripes

Restaurant information
- Established: 2007
- Owner: Dale Schwartz
- Head chef: Dale Schwartz
- Food type: Italian-American
- Rating: 4.3/5 stars
- Location: 1150 Willow Road, Northbrook, Cook County, Illinois, 60062, U.S.
- Coordinates: 42.1064°N 87.8079°W
- Seating capacity: 2,500
- Other locations: 7
- Website: pinstripes.com

Pinstripes is an American restaurant established in 2007 by founder and CEO Dale Schwartz. Pinstripes features Italian-American cuisine as well as bowling, bocce court, and event spaces at each location. The chain has grown to 18 locations across 9 states in the last decade and plans to expand to over 100 locations in the coming years.

On June 12, 2025, it was reported that Pinstripes would be preparing to file for Chapter 11 bankruptcy as soon as the following week, but promised that restaurants would continue to operate. However, on June 17, 2025, it was reported that Pinstripes could end up closing all 18 of their locations. The company stated that they had to eliminate most of their ownership in order to receive $7.5 million in financing in order to continue operating. The company saw major losses throughout early 2025, experiencing an $8 million loss and an 8% decline in sales. In September 2025, the company closed several underperforming locations and filed for Chapter 11 bankruptcy protection.

On October 31, 2025, a bankruptcy court judge approved the sale of the company's assets to Punch Bowl Social in association with current investors and Silverview Capital Partners for an undisclosed amount. The former holding company filed a motion to convert its Chapter 11 case to a Chapter 7 bankruptcy liquidation, in which that was finalized on November 21, 2025.

The restaurant is a privately owned company.
