= CBRE Group =

US commercial real estate services and investment company

CBRE Group, Inc.

- Global financial headquarters at Lever House in Midtown Manhattan
- Type: Public
- Traded as: NYSE: CBRE (Class A); S&P 500 component
- Industry: Real estate
- Founded: August 27, 1906; 120 years ago (as Tucker, Lynch & Coldwell)
- Headquarters: Dallas, Texas (corporate); New York City (financial), U.S.
- Number of locations: 500+ (2025)
- Area served: Worldwide
- Key people: Bob Sulentic (Chair and CEO)
- Services: Commercial real estate services, investment and critical infrastructure services
- Revenue: ▲US$40.6 billion (2025)
- Operating income: ▲US$1.8 billion (2025)
- Net income: ▲US$1.3 billion (2025)
- Total assets: ▲US$30.9 billion (2025)
- Total equity: ▲US$9.2 billion (2025)
- Number of employees: 155,000 (2025)
- Website: cbre.com

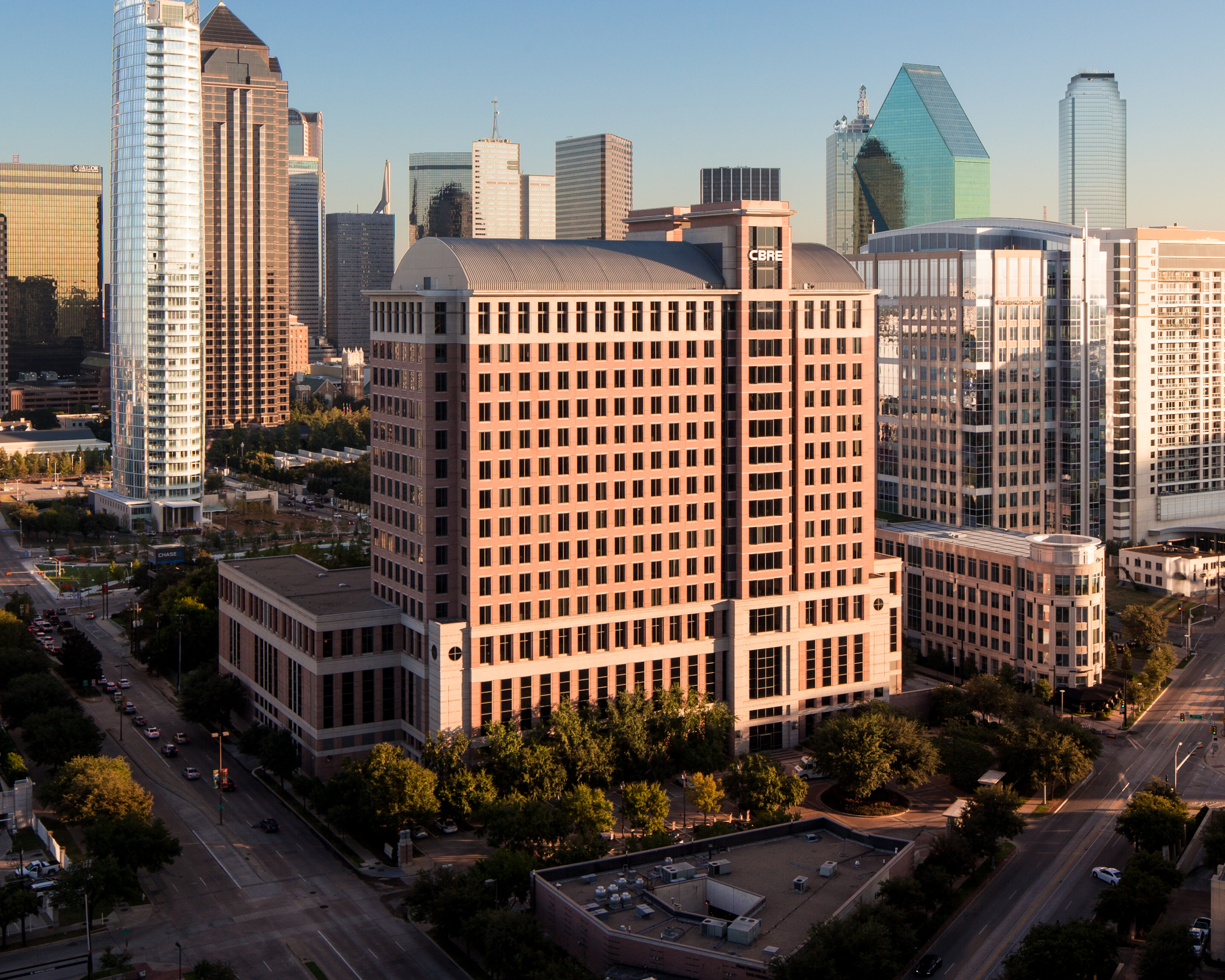
Corporate headquarters on McKinney Avenue in Dallas, Texas

CBRE Group, Inc. is an American commercial real estate services and investment firm, with corporate headquarters in Dallas, Texas, and global financial headquarters at Lever House in Midtown Manhattan. It is the world's largest commercial real estate services and investment firm based on 2025 revenue.

The firm is ranked 118th on the Fortune 500 and has been included every year since 2008. CBRE serves approximately 90 of the companies on the Fortune 100. It is one of the major commercial real estate brokerage firms, alongside JLL, Cushman & Wakefield and Newmark Group.

== Services ==
CBRE provides services to occupiers of and investors in commercial real estate as well as critical infrastructure services. For occupiers, CBRE provides facilities management, project management, transaction (both property sales and leasing) and consulting services, financial services, and valuation, among others. For investors, CBRE provides capital markets (property sales, commercial mortgage brokerage, loan origination and servicing), property leasing, investment management, property management, sustainability, valuation and development services, among others. Its critical infrastructure services include management and operations of data centers and technical services for digital and power infrastructure assets.

CBRE's board of directors includes leaders from a range of industries, including Turner & Townsend Chairman and Chief Executive Officer Vincent Clancy, president of Financial Services at Capital One Sanjiv Yajnik, and former Morgan Stanley Global Chairman of Real Estate Guy Metcalfe.

== History ==
In 1906, Tucker, Lynch & Coldwell, the earliest predecessor to CBRE, was established. In 1913, the company added Benjamin Arthur Banker as a partner and changed the combined entity's name in 1918 to Coldwell, Kern & Banker. In 1919, the name became Coldwell, Kern, Cornwall & Banker, and in 1920, Coldwell, Cornwall & Banker. Cornwall retired in 1940, and the company name changed again to Coldwell, Banker & Company, which was shortened to Coldwell Banker in 1974.

In 1981, Coldwell Banker was acquired by Sears. In 1989, Sears sold Coldwell Banker's commercial unit to a management-led buyout group including The Carlyle Group for approximately $300 million. After the buyout, the company was renamed CB Commercial Real Estate Group. The residential group retained the Coldwell Banker name.

CB Commercial returned to the public markets in 1996 through an initial public offering that raised approximately $80 million. The company subsequently expanded through acquisitions, purchasing Koll Real Estate Services in 1997 and merging with Richard Ellis International the following year. The merger resulted in the CB Richard Ellis name and was followed by the acquisition of UK firm Hillier Parker.

An investment group led by Blum Capital took the company private in 2001 in an $800 million leveraged buyout. CBRE acquired Insignia Financial Group in 2003 and returned to the public markets the following year. In 2006, the company's shares were added to the S&P 500 Index, and the same year the company acquired Trammell Crow Company for $2.2 billion. In 2011, the company acquired the real estate investment business of ING Group for $940 million.

In 2011, the company changed its name to CBRE Group Inc.

In 2013, the company acquired Norland Managed Services, a facilities, energy and project management provider in the United Kingdom and Ireland. In 2015, the company acquired Global Workplace Solutions from Johnson Controls. In 2018, the company acquired FacilitySource. In 2019, the company acquired the London developer Telford Homes.

In 2020, CBRE moved its global headquarters from Los Angeles to Trammell Crow's former headquarters building in Dallas, Texas. In 2021, CBRE Group paid £960 million for a 60% stake in the UK construction consultancy firm Turner & Townsend. In 2025, CBRE merged its project management businesses into Turner & Townsend, creating a $3bn business employing over 20,000 staff in 60 countries. CBRE increased its Turner & Townsend ownership stake to 70%.

In January 2025, CBRE acquired full ownership of Industrious, a provider of coworking office spaces. In January 2025, CBRE announced a new global financial headquarters at Lever House in Midtown Manhattan. In November 2025, CBRE announced the acquisition of Pearce Services from New Mountain Capital for $1.2 billion in cash.

== See also ==
- JLL (company)
- Cushman & Wakefield
- Newmark Group
