= Kepler (institution) =

Nonprofit education program in Kigali, Rwanda

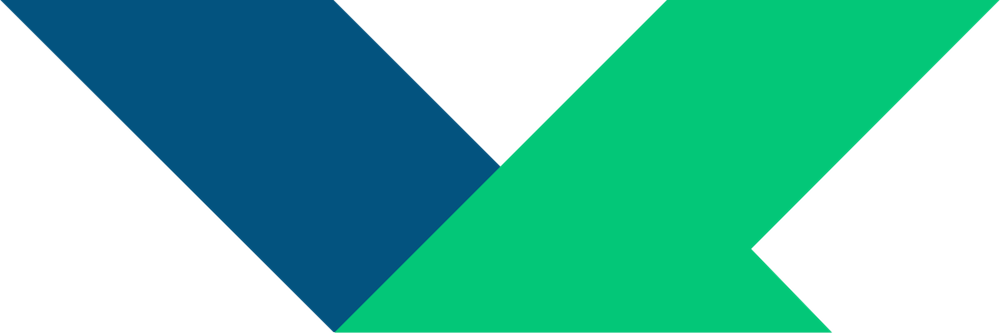
- Type: Private, Nonprofit, Coeducational
- Established: September 2013
- Students: 500
- Location: Kigali, Rwanda
- Website: www.kepler.org

Kepler is a nonprofit higher education program that operates a university campus in Kigali, Rwanda. It is one of the first programs worldwide to integrate massive open online courses (MOOCs), flip teaching, and other education technology practices into a blended learning curriculum, to lower the cost of higher education without a reduction in academic quality or outcomes. All graduates of the program receive an accredited U.S. degree through the competency-based College for America at Southern New Hampshire University.

Kepler is funded primarily through a grant from the IKEA Foundation. In October 2017 Daniel Gwinnell joined the organization as its CEO.

== History ==
Kepler launched in 2004, operating as Orphans of Rwanda and later became Generation Rwanda in 2010. Kepler has been supporting talented and economically vulnerable Rwandan students to have access to a quality higher education. Kepler has reinvented the higher education scene by offering young people pathways to access gainful employment and create positive change within their communities.

In 2013, Kepler partnered with Southern New Hampshire University (SNHU) to scale their impact through their "College for America" program in two locations: the Kepler Kigali campus and the Kiziba Refugee Camp. This partnership combined Southern New Hampshire's University's online degree with in-person seminars, job readiness training, and coaching. In 2015 and 2016, Kepler expanded its reach through the recruitment of Rwandan refugees, which later expanded to students from the Democratic Republic of Congo, Kenya, and Uganda. Kepler opened up a second site at the UNHCR's Kiziba Refugee Camp in Rwanda's Western Province to provide access to higher education to refugees.

In 2018, Kepler launched the Iteme, a preparatory program for secondary school graduates preparing to pursue higher education, with a focus placed on English.

== Function ==
Kepler operates an experimental university campus in Kigali, Rwanda that combines online courses with in-person facilitation and career training. They employ no faculty, opting to use MOOCs and other online resources for expert-level content, while retaining teaching experts to support student learning. Kepler’s Teaching Fellows are a mix of international educators and local Rwandan teachers.

According to its website, Kepler’s goal is “to create a global network of universities that deliver the skills that emerging economies need for a price that [its] students can afford.” In addition to Kepler’s direct work as a university program, they promote the secondary aim of creating a “university in a box.” All of their data is being provided as open source content to encourage other institutions to adopt aspects of Kepler’s model to reduce the cost and increase the quality of current higher education options.

== Sports ==
Kepler launched its sports programme, Kepler Sports, in 2022, which includes basketball and volleyball. Its basketball teams Kepler BBC, both men's and women's, play at the highest level of Rwandan basketball.
