= Mile End railway station (London) =

Former railway station in England

Mile End
- Interactive map of Mile End

General information
- Location: Mile End
- Grid reference: TQ350824
- Number of platforms: 2

Railway companies
- Original company: Eastern Counties Railway
- Pre-grouping: Great Eastern Railway

Key dates
- April 1841: Opened
- 24 May 1872: Closed
- Replaced by: Bethnal Green Junction

Other information
- Coordinates: 51.52436°N 0.05519°W

Mile End was a railway station in Mile End, east London, opened in 1841 by the Eastern Counties Railway on its line between the Shoreditch terminus and Coborn Road.

Shoreditch station was later renamed Bishopsgate, and an additional station called Bishopsgate (Low Level) opened preceding Mile End.

In 1872 a new connection between Liverpool Street, which by then was the new terminus of the Great Eastern Railway, and Hackney Downs was opened and Mile End station was closed and replaced by Bethnal Green Junction just 10 chains (0.20 km) to the west, which later became known simply as Bethnal Green.

== See also ==
- List of closed railway stations in London

Preceding station	Disused railways	Following station
Bishopsgate (Low Level)	Great Eastern Railway	Coborn Road
