= Bethnal Green station =

There are two railway stations named for Bethnal Green, east London.

- Bethnal Green tube station on the Central line
- Bethnal Green railway station on the London Overground Lea Valley Lines
