= Bishopsgate railway station =

Disused railway station in London, England

Bishopsgate
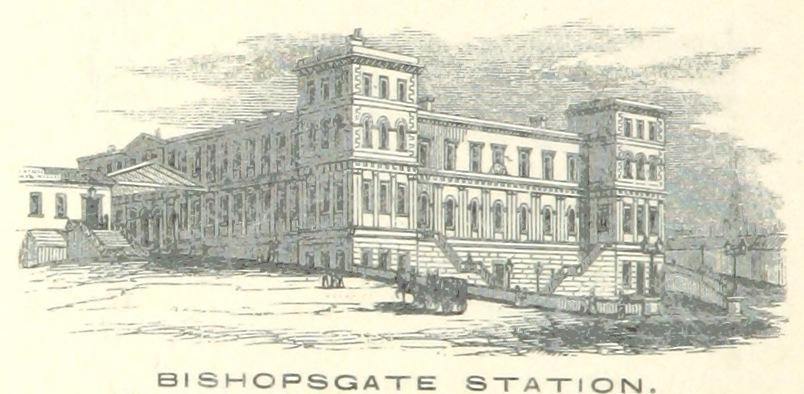
- Interactive map of Bishopsgate

General information
- Location: Shoreditch High Street
- Local authority: London Borough of Tower Hamlets

Railway companies
- Original company: Eastern Counties Railway
- Pre-grouping: Great Eastern Railway
- Post-grouping: London and North Eastern Railway

Key dates
- 1 July 1840: Opened as Shoreditch
- 27 July 1846: Renamed Bishopsgate
- 1 November 1875: Closed to passengers
- 5 December 1964: Closed to freight
- Replaced by: Bishopsgate (Low Level) and Liverpool Street

Other information
- Coordinates: 51.5234°N 0.0768°W

Bishopsgate was a railway station located on the eastern side of Shoreditch High Street in the parish of Bethnal Green (now within the London Borough of Tower Hamlets) on the western edge of the East End of London and just outside the City of London.

It was in use from 1840 to 1875 as a passenger station and then as a freight terminal until it was destroyed by fire in 1964. Substantial remains lay derelict until they were demolished in the early 2000s to make way for Shoreditch High Street railway station which now stands on part of the site.

== History of the site up to 1840 ==
In connection with the extension of the East London Line, some archaeological excavations were undertaken on the site c. 2007–2010 by the Museum of London Archaeology Service. To the west of the site the discovery of Mesolithic struck flint suggested occupation of the banks of the River Walpole. Bishopsgate follows the line of the Roman road and burial plots were found on both sides of the road. The site remained as open fields until the 17th century although there were a number of brick quarries giving their name to Brick Lane, which were active as long ago as the 14th century. The area developed with residential and industrial premises between 1652 and 1682, and this grew up and by the time of the development had declined into one of the poorest areas of London well known for its criminal elements.

=== Construction (1838–1840) ===
When initially surveyed in 1834 the Eastern Counties Railway (ECR) considered a number of sites before settling on Shoreditch. These were reviewed in detail by engineer John Braithwaite and the more difficult sites discounted. A major reason for selecting the Shoreditch site was it was close to the financial district and land at that location was relatively cheap. The area it was being built in was by this time riven by poverty and criminality and during construction armed guards were provided.

Unfortunately for the ECR, the landowners soon realised they could extract a high price for the required land and many delayed for a better price. Although work had begun on the ECR line in late March 1837, it was not until 1838 that work commenced between Shoreditch and Bow. Meanwhile, the Northern and Eastern Railway were looking at a London terminus in Islington and had also given up negotiating access to the Commercial Railway line to Minories in 1838 (Note: The Commercial Railway did not have permission to extend to Fenchurch Street at this time.) The ECR invited the N&ER to share the Shoreditch site and the plan was to have two separate stations, one for each company, on the same site. As the build commenced, this plan was abandoned and the station was designed to operate as a single entity.

== Passenger railway station (1840–1873) ==
=== Description ===
The station was built as part of the London Viaduct engineered by John Braithwaite. The structure was a mile and a quarter long and consisted mostly of brick arches with three cast iron arches, between Shoreditch and Devonshire Street, over Dog Row, Hare Marsh and Globe Road.

When originally built the station had five tracks and these were covered with an overall roof. The two outer tracks each had a platform – one for arrivals and one for departures – whilst the three inner tracks were used for stabling carriages between services. There were a number of small turntables that were used to transfer carriages from one track to another. The carriages at this time were based on the stagecoach design and were shorter than modern day carriages so the space required to move them between tracks was less.

Arriving trains were stopped outside the station and the locomotive would run round the carriages to propel them first to one of two ticket inspection platforms, where ticket inspectors would check tickets, before the train moved forward into the arrival platform. Later ticket inspection was transferred to the station itself.

The structure itself had three levels above street level and the railway was on the first level above the street and approached by ramps. The architect was Sancton Wood and the station building had two four-storey towers. The main roof was constructed of corrugated iron as were the two side roofs covering the arrival and departure platforms. The main roof was supported by two rows of 17 columns.

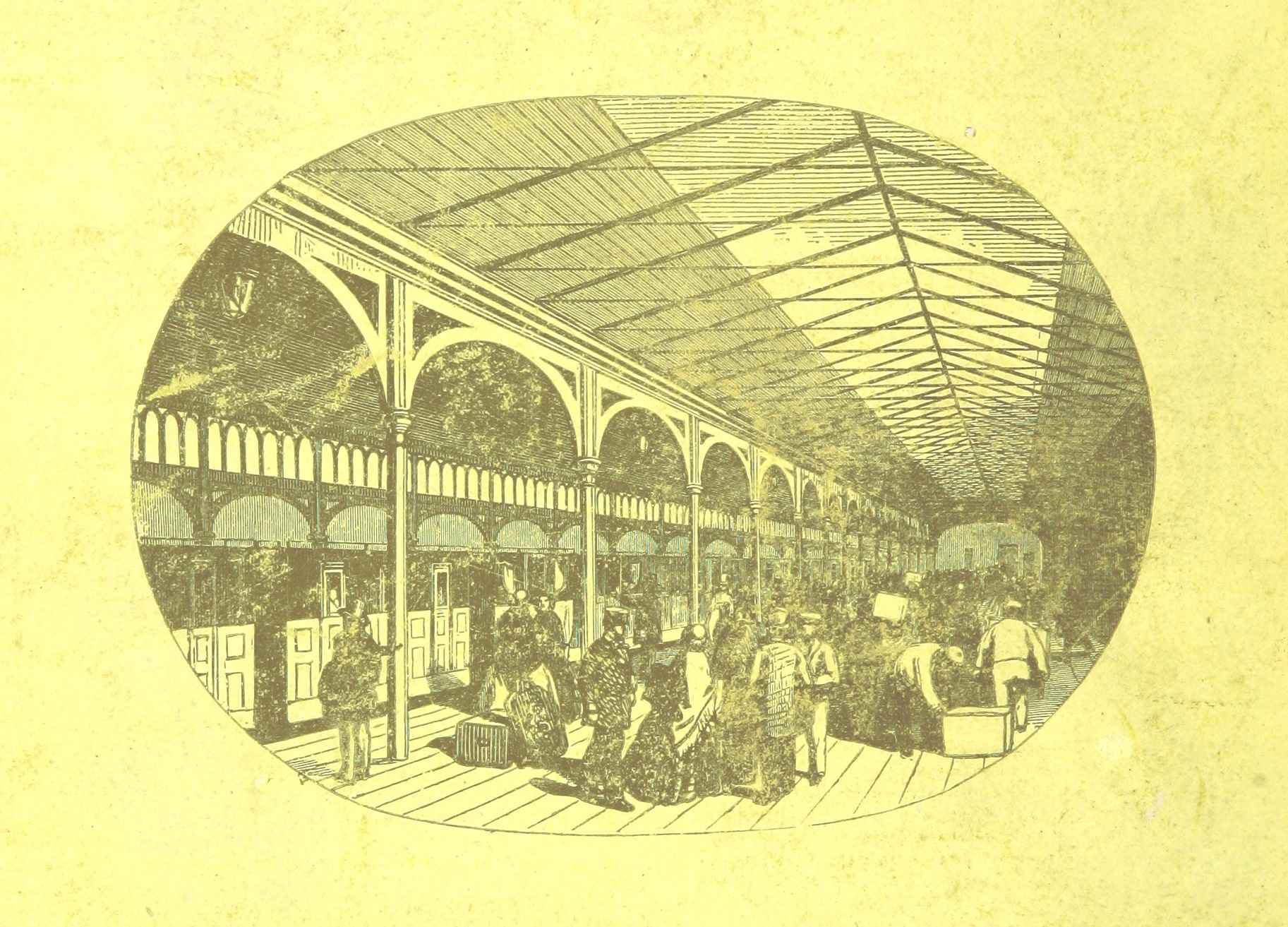
The interior of Bishopsgate station

As the railways expanded, further platforms were added on the north/west side of the complex notably for the introduction of the North Woolwich services. A short bay platform was also added on the opposite side of the station.

There were a number of goods facilities on the approach to the station and over the years these expanded and stretched back to Bethnal Green. Locomotives could be turned, coaled and watered just outside the station or would run back to the nearest engine shed at Stratford.

A full description dated 1844 in The Builder magazine stated:

The stone-faced exterior of the station was a well composed Italianate design. The concourse was flanked on the north and south sides by long two-storeyed ranges, terminated at the west end, and probably at the east, by boldly projecting pavilions crowned with attic storeys. The western pavilions were linked by the recessed screen-wall fronting the concourse, its two storeys raised on a rusticated basement against which twin stairways rose, left and right, to a doorway in the return face of each pavilion. Before the west front was a semi-circular court or area, partly enclosed by the ramped approach roads leading from the street to the raised concourse. The rusticated basement formed a plinth for the Doric pilastered first storey, where each pavilion had three rectangular windows placed between single pilasters, and the main front had seven arch-headed windows ranged between paired pilasters. This arrangement was reversed in the second storey where the three windows of each pavilion had arched-heads linked by bard-imposts, and the seven rectangular windows of the main front were dressed with corniced architraves, the central window being emphasized with a triangular pediment. The attic windows were rectangular and each pavilion was finished with a bold bracketed entablature and a blocking-course. The two-storeyed north front was fairly simple in expression, with a triangular pediment to mark the position of the booking-hall entrance.

=== History ===
The station was opened with the name Shoreditch (or London) on 1 July 1840 to serve as its new permanent terminus when the railway was extended westwards from an earlier temporary terminus at Devonshire Street, near Mile End.

The Northern and Eastern Railway started operating services to and from Shoreditch on 15 September 1840.

When the station opened it was not completed and work continued on the site for many years although this is partly attributable to the fact railways grew in popularity.

In the early years the station handled goods traffic as well as passenger traffic. As the latter increased it became impractical to unload goods at the station (which included cattle) and a new goods facility was opened at Brick Lane in 1844 (although goods traffic continued until 1845 at Shoreditch).

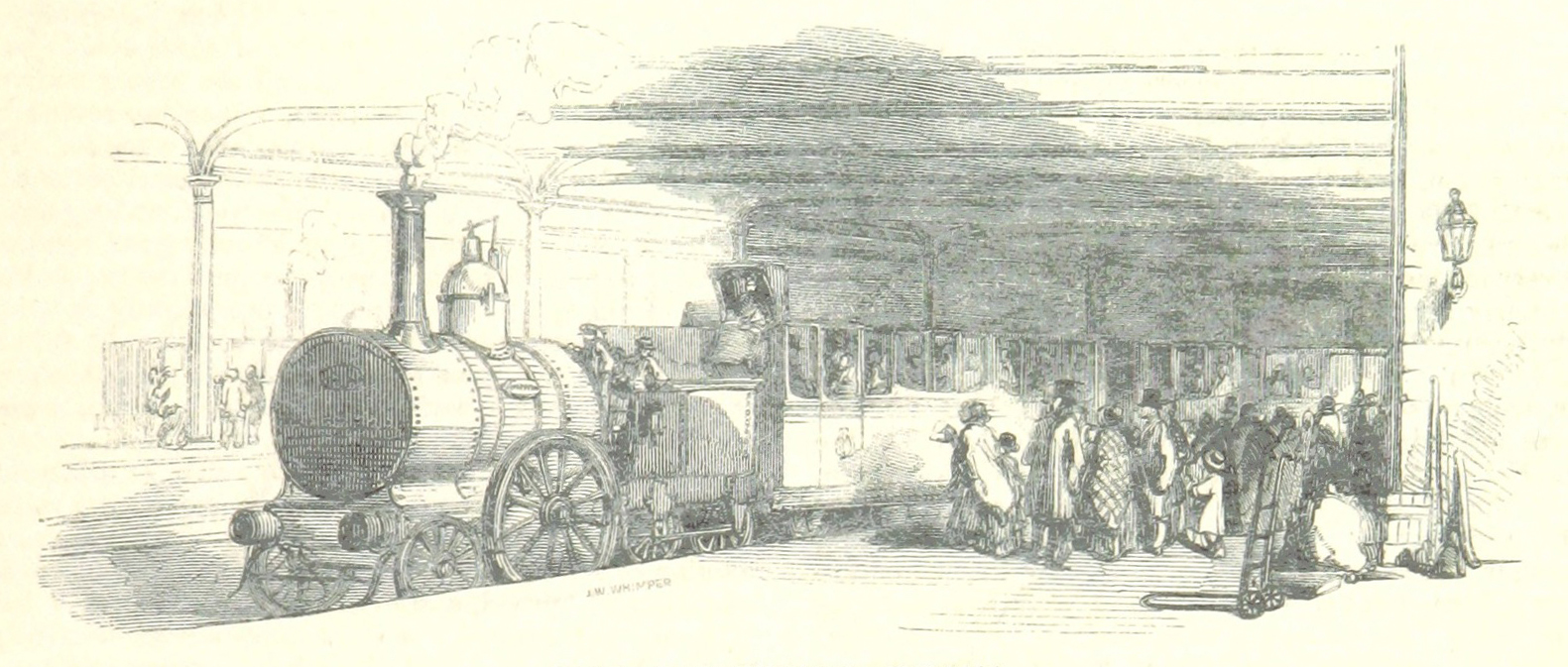
ECR train at Bishopsgate (1851)

As built the track gauge on the ECR was 5 feet but provision was made to convert it to Great Western broad gauge had that gauge been adopted as a national standard. With the extension of the ECR in the early 1840s, it became apparent that 4 ft 8 1/2 in (1,435 mm) standard gauge was a better choice, and in September and October 1844 gauge conversion was carried out throughout the ECR and N&ER systems.

The station was renamed Bishopsgate on 27 July 1846 with the intention of drawing more City commuters by naming it after the major thoroughfare in the heart of the financial district.

By 1847 the ticket inspection platform on the south side had been converted into an arrival platform and an additional platform was provided on the north side for the North Woolwich services. Trains used a timber viaduct built on brick piers to access the platform which had its own booking office. The ECR hoped traffic would be generated by a ferry connection to Woolwich which at that time had no rail link.

By 1850 the departure platform had been extended and widened at the expense of one of the three stabling sidings located between the arrival and departure platforms. The turntable had been enlarged reflecting that larger more powerful locomotives were operating the services, and the station buildings were also extended at this time.

A big storm on 26/27 December 1852 saw the corrugated iron roof damaged beyond repair and this was replaced during 1853. During 1853 the southern side of the viaduct was extended to enable lengthening of the 1847 arrival platform.

By the end of 1853 an additional platform had been added on the north side (near to the North Woolwich platform) and two further sidings were added. These were used as rail access to a street level coal depot.

By 1855 a further bay platform had been added on the south side.

In 1862, the ECR amalgamated with a number of other East Anglian railway companies to form the Great Eastern Railway (GER). At the time the GER also used Fenchurch Street as a terminus but with new lines planned the GER decided the Bishopsgate station was too cramped (and badly positioned) for further development as a passenger service and began building the approaches to a new station at Liverpool Street in 1865.

The GER did extend the northside of the viaduct approaching Bishopsgate which saw the N&ER Brick Lane goods depot (see below) demolished. It is thought this was to improve access to the coal depot at Bishopsgate. Continuing congestion issues saw two new platforms built as late as 1872 on the site of the former coal depot. This was then final alteration at Bishopsgate which totalled eight platforms on closure to passengers.

The new extension to Liverpool Street opened to a new station called Bishopsgate (Low Level) in 1872, before extension into the new Liverpool Street station which opened in 1874. After a brief period where both terminus stations were in operation and Bishopsgate Low Level station operated as a through station, Bishopsgate station was closed to passenger traffic on 1 November 1875.

The new line into Liverpool Street paralleled the viaduct so a number of goods facilities were demolished or altered at this time.

=== Passenger services ===
When the station opened on services were run by the Eastern Counties Railway to Romford there were 11 weekday ECR trains to Brentwood. This increased to 18 when the Northern and Eastern Railway started operation on 15 September 1840.

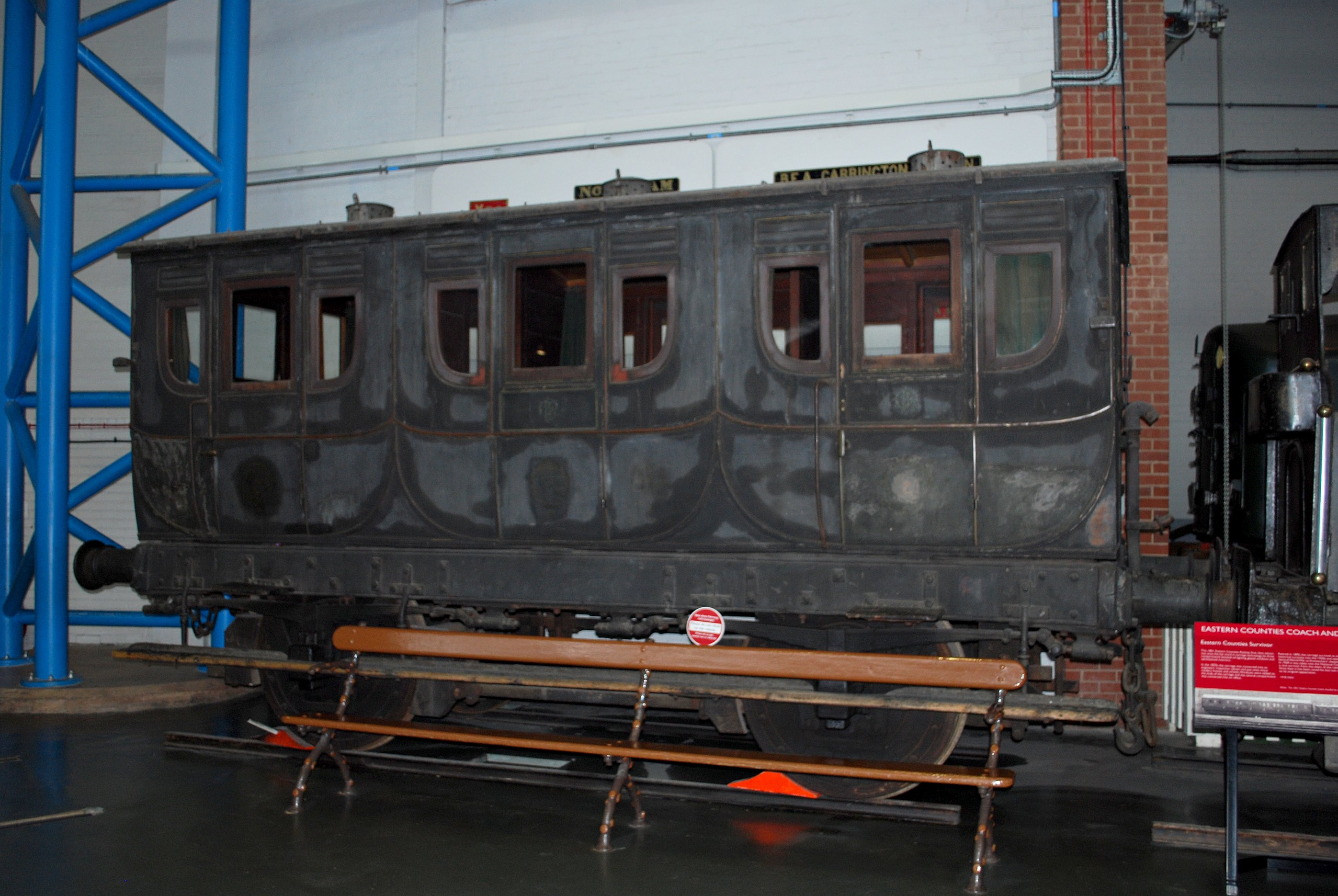
Eastern Counties Railway 1st Class carriage built 1851

As new lines were built other destinations were served.

- Bishops Stortford 1842
- Colchester 1843
- Hertford 1843
- Cambridge 1845
- Norwich (via Cambridge) 1845
- Ipswich 1846 (via Eastern Union Railway)
- North Woolwich 1847
- Enfield (via Angel Road) 1849

The Bradshaw's Railway Guide dated 1 March 1850 had the following services departing Shoreditch (although the station had been renamed Bishopsgate in 1846):

Weekday Departures by destination: March 1850
Destination	No of services	Remarks
Brentwood	2	Via Ilford and Romford
Broxbourne	5	Via Angel Road
Cambridge	1	Via Broxbourne
Chelmsford	1	Via Ilford and Romford
Colchester	1	Via Ilford and Romford
Enfield	2	Via Angel Road.
Hertford	4	Via Broxbourne. Later renamed Hertford East
Ipswich	3	Via Colchester – Eastern Union Railway Colchester to Ipswich
North Woolwich	16	Via Stratford Bridge (later renamed Stratford Market). Ferry connection to Woolwich.
Norwich	7	via Bishops Stortford, Cambridge, Ely and Thetford
Norwich	2	Via Colchester and Ipswich – Eastern Union Railway Colchester to Norwich
Stratford	1	Last train of day at 22:15 p.m.
Waltham	3	Later named Waltham Abbey

Generally, there was a 15-minute time interval between services which was the journey time of a stopping train to Stratford (calling at Mile End and Victoria Park & Bow. A fast train took 10 minutes which was the minimum time allowed, and a physical barrier was placed across the track after a train had departed. Absolute block between Bishopsgate and Stratford was introduced in 1851. Some services operated together with the coaches for the rear service being slipped approaching Stratford. (Note: An accident on 16 September 1840 at Stratford suggested that this was done on the move as some carriages collided with the locomotive waiting to take them forward. Whether this was the practice at Stratford in 1850 is unclear.)

Following the opening of the London Tilbury & Southend Railway (LT&SR) in 1854, services from Tilbury and, by 1856 Southend, operated via Stratford where the train would split into Bishopsgate and Fenchurch Street portions. This arrangement lasted until 1858 when the LT&SR opened a more direct route avoiding an increasingly busy Stratford station. Other ECR services to Loughton and about half of the North Woolwich operated from Fenchurch Street rather than Bishospgate. The London & Blackwall Railway charged for each train using Fenchurch Street and a dispute lasting until 1857 saw some Loughton line services using Bishopsgate for a period.

By the 1860s with the suburbs expanding and new lines being proposed the GER decided to build a new bigger terminus nearer the city at Liverpool Street. As part of this project a new station called Bishopsgate (Low Level) was opened in 1872 and acted as a temporary terminus for suburban services from the Enfield (via Seven Sisters) and Walthamstow lines. (Note: Walthamstow was the terminus of what became the Chingford branch at this time. Two new platforms were opened at Bishopsgate and were used by these services for a brief period before the low-level station opened) Early in 1874 the first four platforms at Liverpool Street station opened, and Bishopsgate (Low Level) station became a normal through station. However, longer distance trains continued to use Bishopsgate (High-Level) as it was referred to then.

=== Staffing ===
An 1844 report for the ECR recommended staffing levels as:

Staffing levels 1844
Post	No	Remarks
Station Master	1	Worked 7:00 a.m. until the arrival of the last train. responsible for operation of the station which included the early goods facilities and the locomotives operating within the station area. This was the first such post on the ECR and the first official incumbent (William Dowling) was paid £250 p.a. and provided with accommodation within the station. He started in the role from June 1845.
Deputy station master	1	4:45 a.m. until 8:30 p.m. – assisted the Station Master. First deputy was Thomas H Robinson who in fact acted up as the station master until April 1845. His replacement also acted up until Dowling started in post two months later.
Ticket takers	3	Presumably located at the ticket platform outside the station
Policeman	6	Working the signals and sweeping the platforms
Night watchmen	2	Responsible for operation of the signals and operation of overnight goods and mail trains
Porters	29	Duties included coaling and watering locomotives, cleaning carriages and horse trucks, coupling/uncoupling, maintenance and station cleaning

=== Accidents and incidents ===
- On 21 November 1856, nine people were injured in a low-speed collision at Bishopsgate. The author of a Board of Trade report into the incident stated: "I have no doubt that it was occasioned by the carelessness of the driver, and a loose way of conducting the shunting in the yard; and I am of the opinion that proper instructions on the subject of signalling for the shunting of trains should form part of those issued for the guidance of drivers and shunters."
- On 22 November 1871, a head-on collision due to a driver's error and inadequate signalling resulted in a derailment. Fourteen people were injured in the incident.
- On 19 June 1872, the driver of a service from Enfield on its approach to Bishopsgate crossed the path of a Shenfield-bound train, resulting in a collision that injured eight people.
- On 9 August 1872, six people were injured when a train hit the buffers at Bishopsgate. The Board of Trade reported: "The accident appears to have been caused by miscalculation on the part of the engine-driver of the speed at which he was entering the station."

== Goods station ==
Bishopsgate was extensively reconstructed by the Great Eastern Railway between 1878 and 1880 to convert it into a goods station. "By May 1880 the old facade and side walls had been completely removed."

The new goods station opened in 1881 and became known as Bishopsgate goods yard. The existing depot at Brick Lane closed as a consequence. The new goods depot had three levels.

- A basement at street level – this was in two separate halves with the site being bisected by Wheeler Street. Wagons could be lowered to this level and moved around by a system of rails and pulleys.
- The rail level – hoists from this level connected to the basement level. There were ten sidings for the wagons to be loaded and unloaded grouped around five loading banks.
- A warehouse above the rail level where incoming goods could be stored in the warehouse on-site or transferred directly to road vehicles for onward transportation to their destinations.

There was also a large cartage yard at rail level. For many years most of the goods would have gone on by horse and cart and the GER maintained stables nearby in Quaker Street.

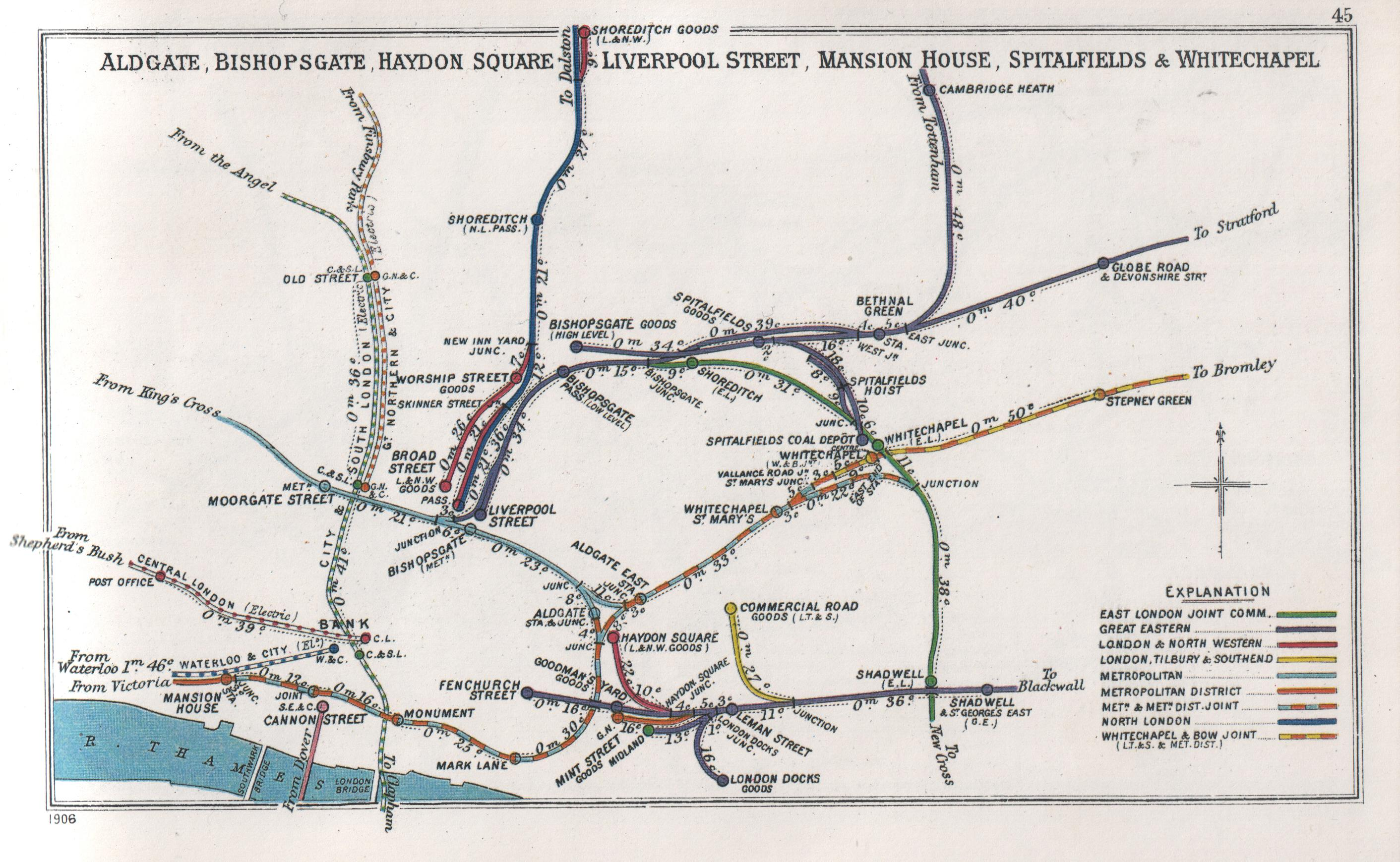
Map of the Bishopsgate and Liverpool Street area, 1906

As a goods depot, Bishopsgate handled very large volumes of goods from the eastern ports and was arranged over three levels with turntables and hoists allowing railway wagons to be moved individually around the station for loading and unloading.

=== London and North Eastern Railway (1923–1947) ===
Following the Railways Act 1921, Bishopsgate goods station become a London and North Eastern Railway facility on 1 January 1923.

During the 1920s there were 1,020 people employed on the site including 648 being employed in the delivery of goods (cartage), 200-300 clerical staff and operating staff. It is likely at times of high demand, temporary staff were taken on to assist with loading and unloading wagons.

During the 1930s typically 350 wagons per day would be dealt with, equating to between 20 and 30 trains per day. During the fruit and vegetable seasons this number might reach 850.

=== The nationalisation era (1948–1964) ===
Following nationalisation on 1 January 1948 Bishopsgate Goods station became part of the Eastern Region of British Railways.

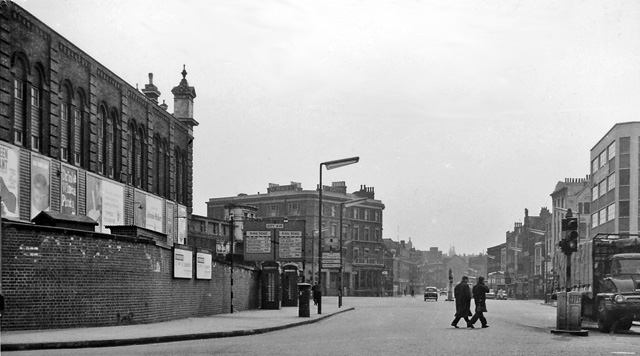
Bishopsgate Goods Station, exterior, 1962

By the 1950s the majority of trains serving Bishopsgate were transfer-freights from Temple Mills or Goodmayes yards, although direct services carrying goods from Europe operated from Parkeston Quay. To allow processing of this traffic, facilities at Bishopsgate included a bonded customs store. The bulk of the traffic was food with two fish trains arriving overnight. The yard also handled steel, machinery and small containers (the forerunner of today's intermodal container wagons). During the late 1950s/1960s it was difficult to recruit staff to work the yard as better paid opportunities were available within London.

Shunting was carried out by steam locomotives in the 1950s – generally former GER 0-6-0T locomotives from classes J67 or J69. These would have been replaced by small diesel shunters later in the decade. Some railtours used Bishopsgate in its latter years.

A major fire on 5 December 1964 destroyed the station. Within 40 minutes of the first firefighters arriving on scene, the scale of the blaze was so intense and widespread that the London Fire Brigade had mobilised 40 fire engines. In addition, 12 aerial turntable platforms, two firehose-laying vehicles and two emergency tenders as well as 235 firefighters battled the fire which killed two customs officials, Mr Thomas S. Tanner aged 44 and Mr George Humphrey aged about 60, and destroyed hundreds of railway wagons, dozens of motor vehicles and millions of pounds worth of goods. At this time 1200 people were employed on the site.

The station was subsequently closed and the upper-level structures were largely demolished.

== After closure (1964–present day) ==
Over the next 40 years much of the site became derelict. Following an extended period of planning, the entire site was demolished in 2003–04, with the exception of a number of Grade II listed structures: ornamental gates on Shoreditch High Street and the remaining 850 feet (260 m) of the so-called "Braithwaite Viaduct", one of the oldest railway structures in the world and the second-oldest in London. The demolition of the former Bishopsgate station made way for Shoreditch High Street station on the East London line extension in 2010, part of the new London Overground network, replacing Shoreditch Underground station to the east which had closed in June 2006.

The rail bridge that passed over the Liverpool Street approaches and into the site was demolished over Christmas 2007.

A mixed-use development on the former goods yard site, named The Goodsyard, has also been proposed.

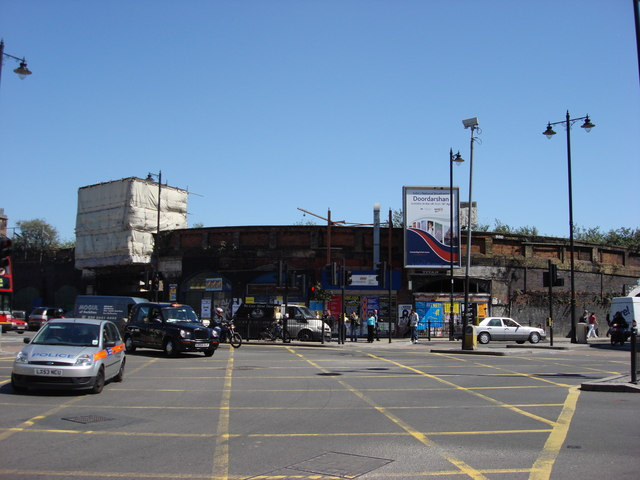
Bishopsgate goods yard, main road entrance on Shoreditch High Street, 2007

== Other goods facilities ==
The line between Bishospgate and Bethnal Green was lined with a number of other goods facilities.

=== Brick Lane ===
The Northern and Eastern Railway opened a small goods depot here in 1843. This depot was closed in 1865 when additional tracks into Bishopsgate were provided.

This was followed by the ECR goods facility which opened slightly to the east in May or June 1844 and was located north of the line. The facility was later expanded and occupied a sizeable plot.

The shed was located at street level and a steeply graded cable worked incline saw wagons lowered from track to street level. This was later replaced by a number of wagon hoists.

The Brick Lane facility closed and was replaced by the Bishopsgate Goods station in 1882.

=== Pedley Street Goods depot ===
This was located east of the granary (below) and opened in 1848. However, the site was used by the granary expansion in the 1850s and it was demolished during 1852 and 1853.

=== The Granary ===
Located near Pedley Street this was constructed in the 1840s and is thought to have been opened in October 1846. It was located on the south side of the viaduct, and the granary was further extended taking over the goods depot site (above) and opening in October 1854.

At its greatest extent it had enough storage capacity to store 44,000 sacks of grain.

The granary was destroyed by a fire on 1 January 1919 that burned for two days.

=== Shoreditch Coal depot ===
Opened in 1868 by the GER, this was located south and west of Bethnal Green station and its main feature was a curving brick viaduct carrying six lines. At ground level, the arches were rented out by coal merchants and used for storage with coal being dropped directly into the arches from the wagons above. A couple of sidings were provided at ground level and accessed through a hoist in the granary. In 1900 a steel viaduct was built with a two-wagon hoist to serve the street level sidings and a siding on the East London Line.

Transfers to the East London Line stopped in the 1950s although the hoist was used to supply the ground-level sidings in the coal yard. The yard was run down and closed in the 1960s. A small section of the brick viaduct exists at the end of Tent Street E15.

Before Shoreditch coal depot was built a small coal depot existed on the northern side of the Bishopsgate site and it is thought this closed "c1872/3" when two new platforms were added.
