= Liverpool Street station =

London Underground and railway station

Liverpool Street
- London Liverpool Street
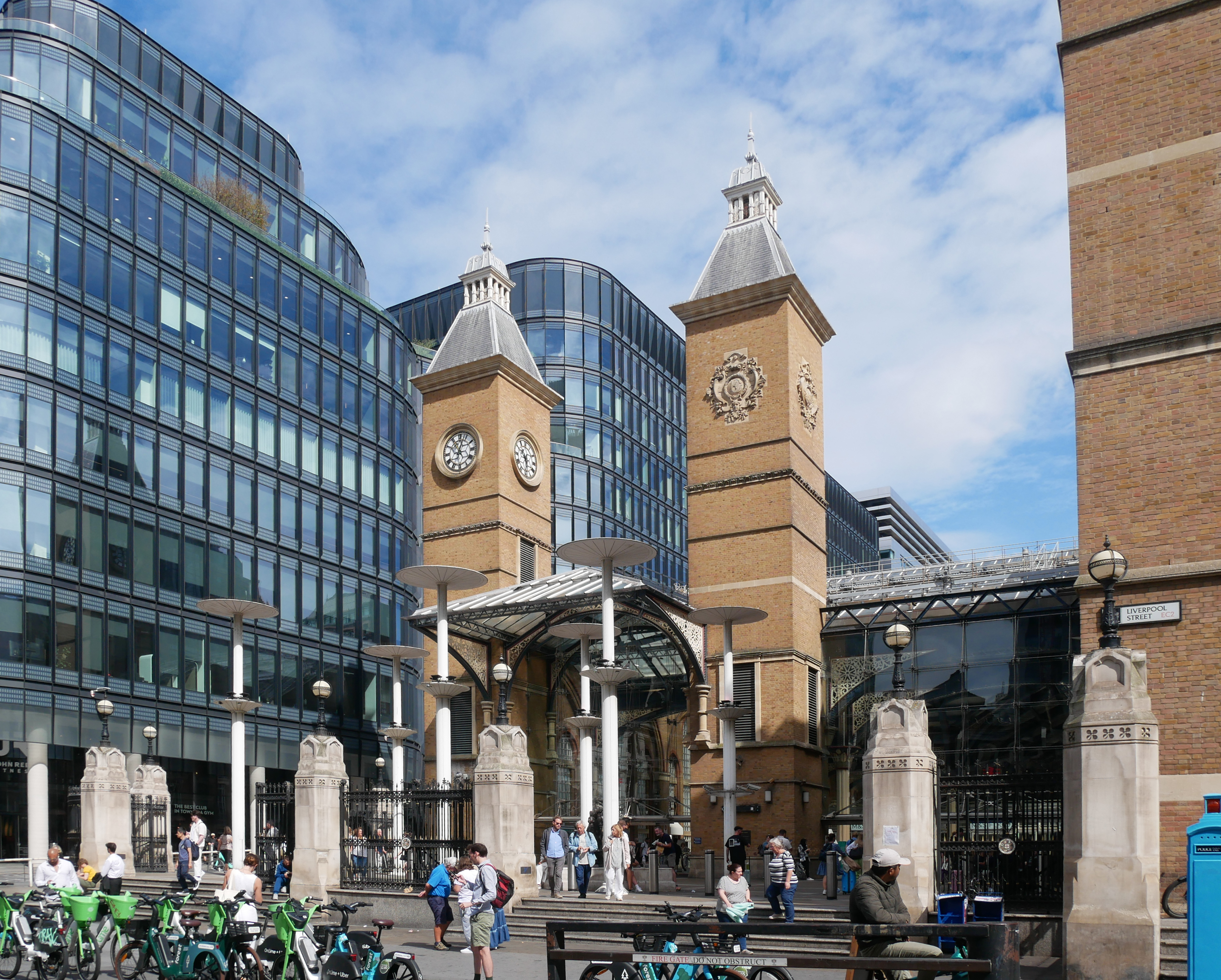
- Main station entrance
- Interactive map of Liverpool Street

General information
- Location: Bishopsgate
- Local authority: City of London
- Managed by: Network Rail
- Station code: LST
- DfT category: A
- Number of platforms: 19
- Accessible: Yes
- Fare zone: 1
- OSI: Bank; Fenchurch Street; Moorgate; Liverpool Street

London Underground annual entry and exit
- 2021: ▲26.60 million
- 2022: ▲55.84 million
- 2023: ▲57.23 million
- 2024: ▲58.63 million
- 2025: ▲60.08 million

National Rail annual entry and exit
- 2021–22: ▲32.165 million
- Interchange: ▲3.016 million
- 2022–23: ▲80.448 million
- Interchange: ▲5.663 million
- 2023–24: ▲94.500 million
- Interchange: ▲8.699 million
- 2024–25: ▲98.016 million
- Interchange: ▼6.535 million
- 2025–26: ▲102.71 million
- Interchange: ▲7.250 million

Railway companies
- Original company: Great Eastern Railway
- Post-grouping: London & North Eastern Railway

Key dates
- 2 October 1874: Opened
- 12 July 1875: Underground station opened
- 24 May 2022: Elizabeth line opened

Listed status
- Listed feature: Gothic style offices and two western bays of train sheds
- Listing grade: II
- Entry number: 1286133
- Added to list: 5 August 1975

Other information
- External links: TfL station info page; Departures; Facilities
- Coordinates: 51°31′07″N 0°04′53″W

Liverpool Street station, also known as London Liverpool Street, is a major central London railway terminus and connected London Underground station in the north-eastern corner of the City of London, in the ward of Bishopsgate Without. It is the terminus of the West Anglia Main Line to Cambridge and Ely; the Great Eastern Main Line to Norwich; commuter trains serving east London and destinations in the East of England, including the Weaver line of the London Overground; and the Stansted Express service to Stansted Airport.

The station opened in 1874, as a replacement for Bishopsgate station as the Great Eastern Railway's main London terminus. By 1895, it had the most platforms of any London terminal station. During the First World War, an air raid on the station killed 16 on site, and 146 others in nearby areas. In the build-up to the Second World War, the station served as the entry point for thousands of child refugees arriving in London as part of the Kindertransport rescue mission. The station was damaged by the 1993 Bishopsgate bombing and, during the 7 July 2005 bombing, seven passengers were killed when a bomb exploded aboard an Underground train, just after it had departed from Liverpool Street. New platforms for the Elizabeth line opened in 2022 as part of the Crossrail project.

Liverpool Street was built as a dual-level station, with provision for the London Underground. A tube station opened in 1875 for the Metropolitan Railway; the tube station is now served by the Central, Circle, Hammersmith & City and Metropolitan lines. It is in London fare zone 1 and is managed directly by Network Rail. With 102.7 million passenger entrances and exits between April 2025 and March 2026, it has been the busiest station in the United Kingdom for four consecutive years and the first to surpass 100 million passengers per annum since ORR records began.

== Main line station ==
=== History ===
==== New terminus (1875) ====
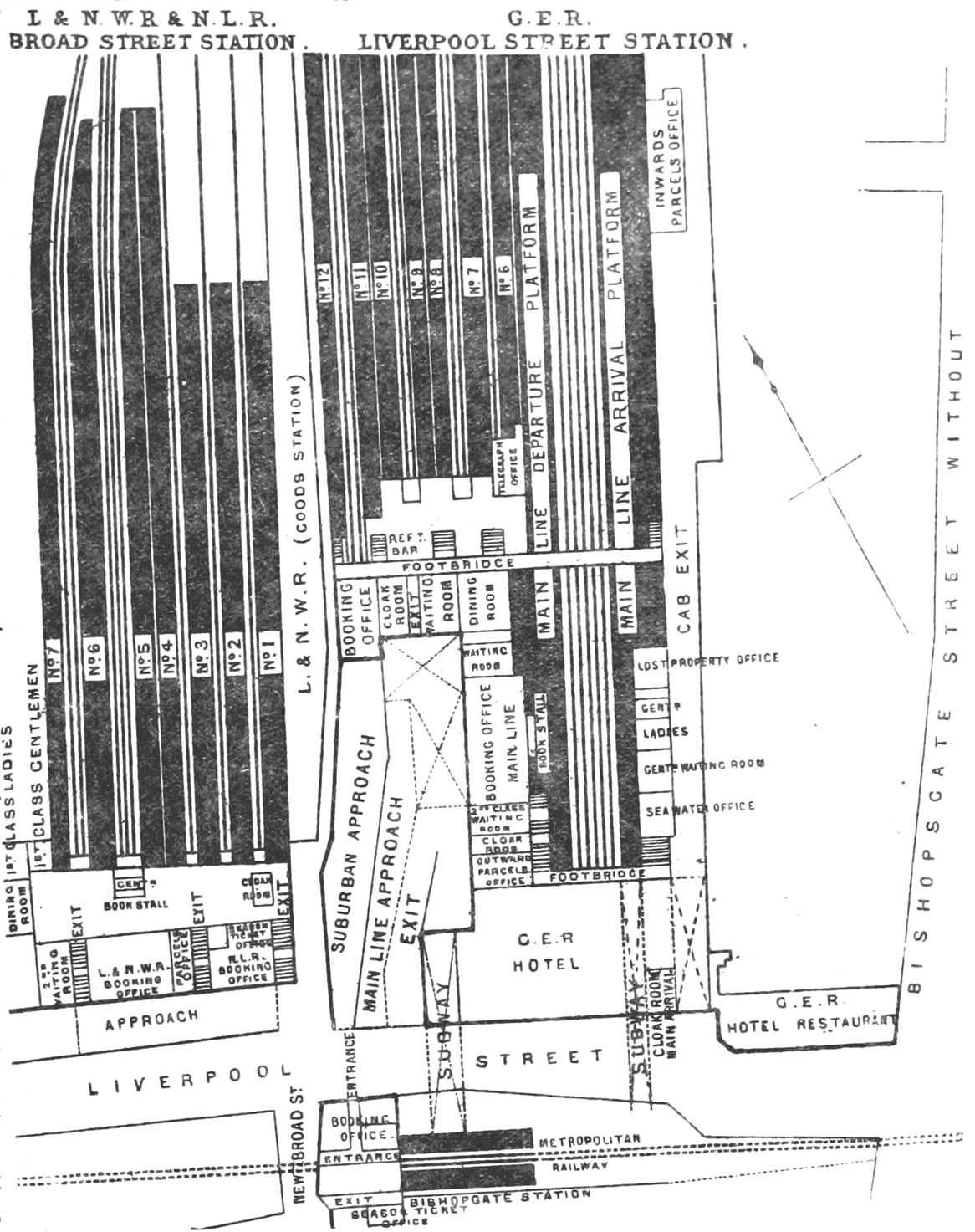
Plan of Liverpool Street and Broad Street (c.1888)

Liverpool Street station was built as the new London terminus of the Great Eastern Railway (GER) which served Norwich and King's Lynn. The GER had been formed from the merger of several railway companies, inheriting Bishopsgate as its London terminus. Bishopsgate was inadequate for the company's passenger traffic; its Shoreditch location was in the heart of one of the poorest slums in London and hence badly situated for the City of London commuters the company wanted to attract. Consequently, the GER planned a more central station. The original intention was to build a terminus which reached as far south as the road London Wall, and which would be as tall as the Broad Street station which was being planned at the same time, however the city authorities did not permit the more southerly location.

By 1865, plans changed to include a circa 1-mile (1.6 km) long line branching from the main line east of the company's existing terminus in Shoreditch, and a new station at Liverpool Street as the main terminus, with Bishopsgate station to be used for freight traffic. The station at Liverpool Street (the street had been named after the Tory Prime Minister Robert Jenkinson, 2nd Earl of Liverpool in 1829) was to be built for the use of the GER and of the East London Railway on two levels, with the underground East London line around 37 ft (11 m) below this, and the GER tracks supported on brick arches. The station was planned to be around 630 by 200 ft (192 by 61 m) in area, with its main façade onto Liverpool Street and an additional entrance on Bishopsgate-Street (now called Bishopsgate and forming part of the A10). The main train shed was to be a two-span wood construction with a central void providing light and ventilation to the lower station, and the station buildings were to be in an Italianate style to the designs of the GER's architect.

The line and station construction were authorised by the Great Eastern Railway (Metropolitan Station and Railways) Act 1864. The station was built on a 10-acre (4.0 ha) site previously occupied by the Bethlem Royal Hospital, adjacent to Broad Street station, west of Bishopsgate and facing onto Liverpool Street to the south. The development land was compulsorily purchased, displacing around 3,000 residents of the parish of St Botolph-without-Bishopsgate. Around 7,000 people living in tenements around Shoreditch were evicted to complete the line towards Liverpool Street, while the City of London Theatre and City of London Gasworks were both demolished. To manage the disruption caused by rehousing, the company was required by the 1864 Act to run daily low-cost workmen's trains from the station.

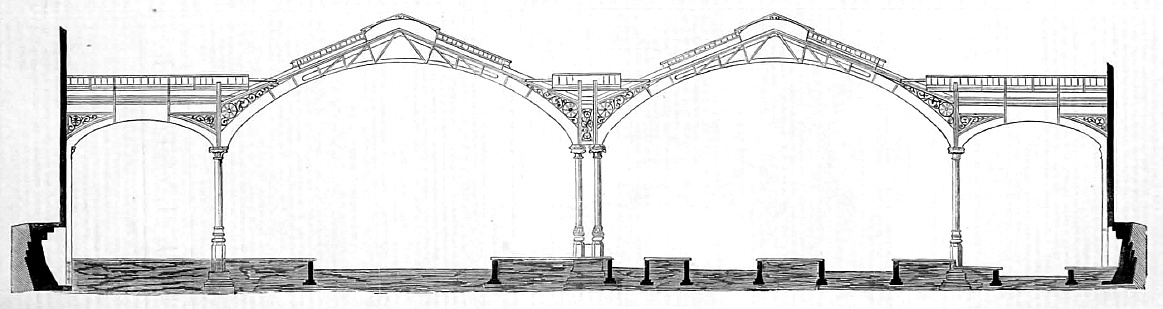
Original trainshed cross-section (1875)

The station was designed by GER engineer Edward Wilson and built by Lucas Brothers; the roof was designed and constructed by the Fairburn Engineering Company. The overall design was approximately Gothic, built using stock bricks and bath stone dressings. The building incorporated booking offices as well as the company offices of the GER, including chairman's, board, committee, secretary and engineers' rooms. The roof was spanned by four wrought iron spans, two central spans of 109 ft (33 m) and outer spans of 46 and 44 ft (14 and 13 m), 730 ft (220 m) in length over the eastern main lines, and 450 ft (140 m) long over the local platforms; the station had 10 platforms, two of which were used for main-line trains and the remainder for suburban trains.

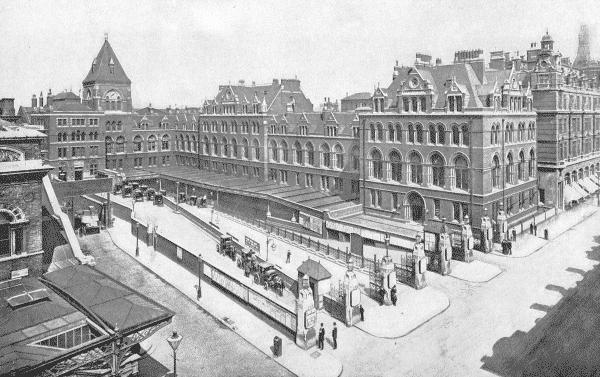
Liverpool Street station, west elevation (1896)

The station was built with a connection to the sub-surface Metropolitan Railway, with the platform sunk below ground level; consequently there are considerable gradients leaving the station. The Metropolitan Railway used the station as a terminus from 1 February 1875 until 11 July 1875; their own underground station opened on 12 July 1875, and the Metropolitan Railway connection was closed in 1904.

Local trains began serving the partially completed station from 2 October 1874, and it was fully opened on 1 November 1875, at a final cost of over £2 million. The original City terminus at Bishopsgate closed to passengers and was converted for use as a goods station from 1881. This continued until it was destroyed by fire in 1964.

The Great Eastern Hotel adjoining the new Liverpool Street station opened in May 1884. It was designed by Charles Barry Jr. (son of the celebrated architect Charles Barry who designed the Houses of Parliament). Upon opening, it was the only hotel in the City of London. An extension called the Abercon Rooms was built in 1901, designed by Colonel Robert William Edis. The hotel includes the Hamilton Rooms, named after former GER chairman Lord Claud Hamilton.

==== Expansion (1895) ====
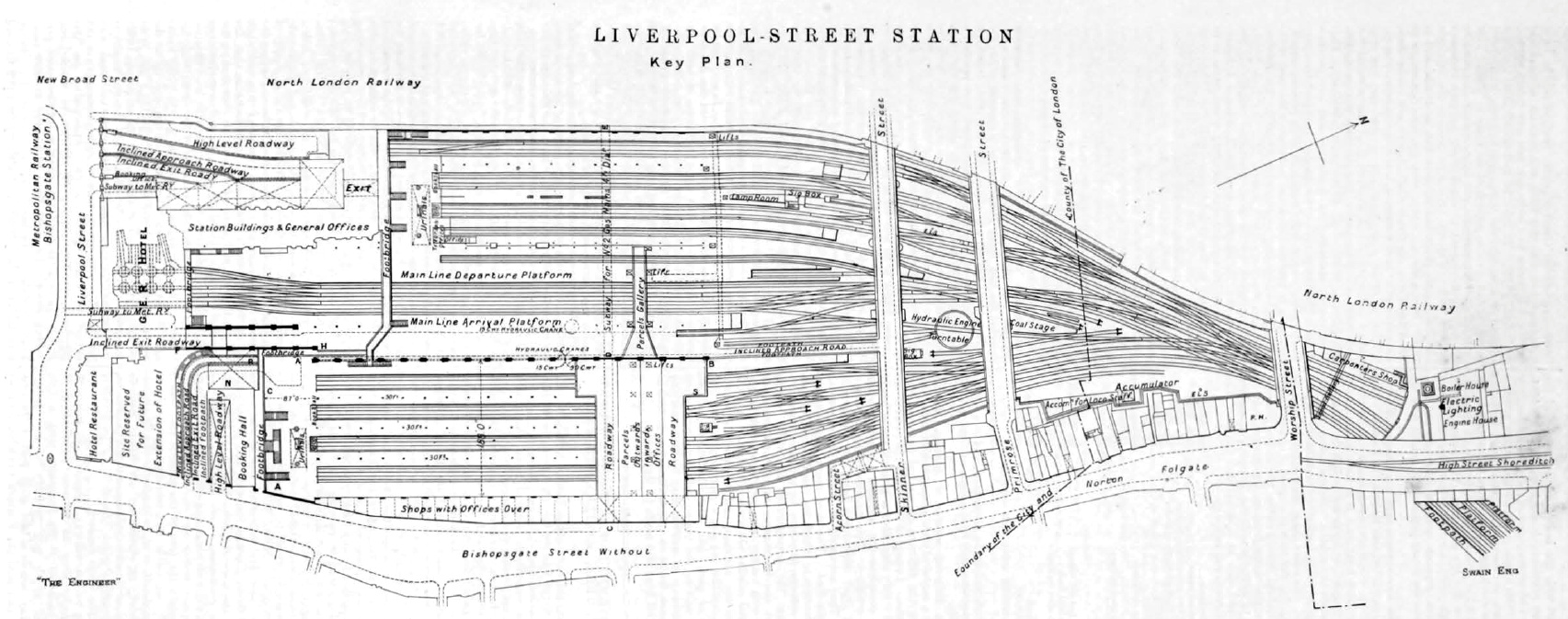
Ground plan of expanded station (1895). At the time, Liverpool Street had the most platforms of any London terminus station.

Although initially viewed as an expensive white elephant, within 10 years the station was working at capacity (about 600 trains per day) and the GER was acquiring land to the east of the station for expansion. An Act of Parliament was obtained in 1888 and work started in 1890 on the eastward expansion of Liverpool Street by adding eight new tracks and platforms. This gave the station the most platforms of any London terminus until Victoria station was expanded in 1908.

The main station was extended about 230 ft (70 m) eastwards; additional shops and offices were constructed east of the new train shed up to the parish boundary with Bishopsgate-Street Without. A new roof was built over the new construction. The outer wall was constructed with Staffordshire blue brick and Ruabon bricks. The four train shed roofs were carried out by Messrs. Handyside and Co., supervised by a Mr Sherlock, the resident engineer; all the foundations, earthwork and brickwork were carried out by Mowlem & Co. Electric power (for lighting) was supplied from an engine house north of the station. Additional civil works included three iron bridges carrying road traffic over the railway on Skinner, Primrose and Worship Streets. The bridge ironwork was supplied and erected by the Horseley Company. John Wilson was chief engineer, with W. N. Ashbee as architect. As part of the works, the GER was obliged by Parliament to rehouse all tenants displaced by the works, with 137 put into existing property and the remaining 600 into tenements constructed at the company's expense.

By the turn of the 20th century, Liverpool Street had one of the most extensive suburban rail services in London, including branches to Southend Victoria and Woodford, and was one of the busiest in the world. In 1912, around 200,000 passengers used the station daily on around 1,000 separate trains.

==== First World War and memorials (1917–1922) ====
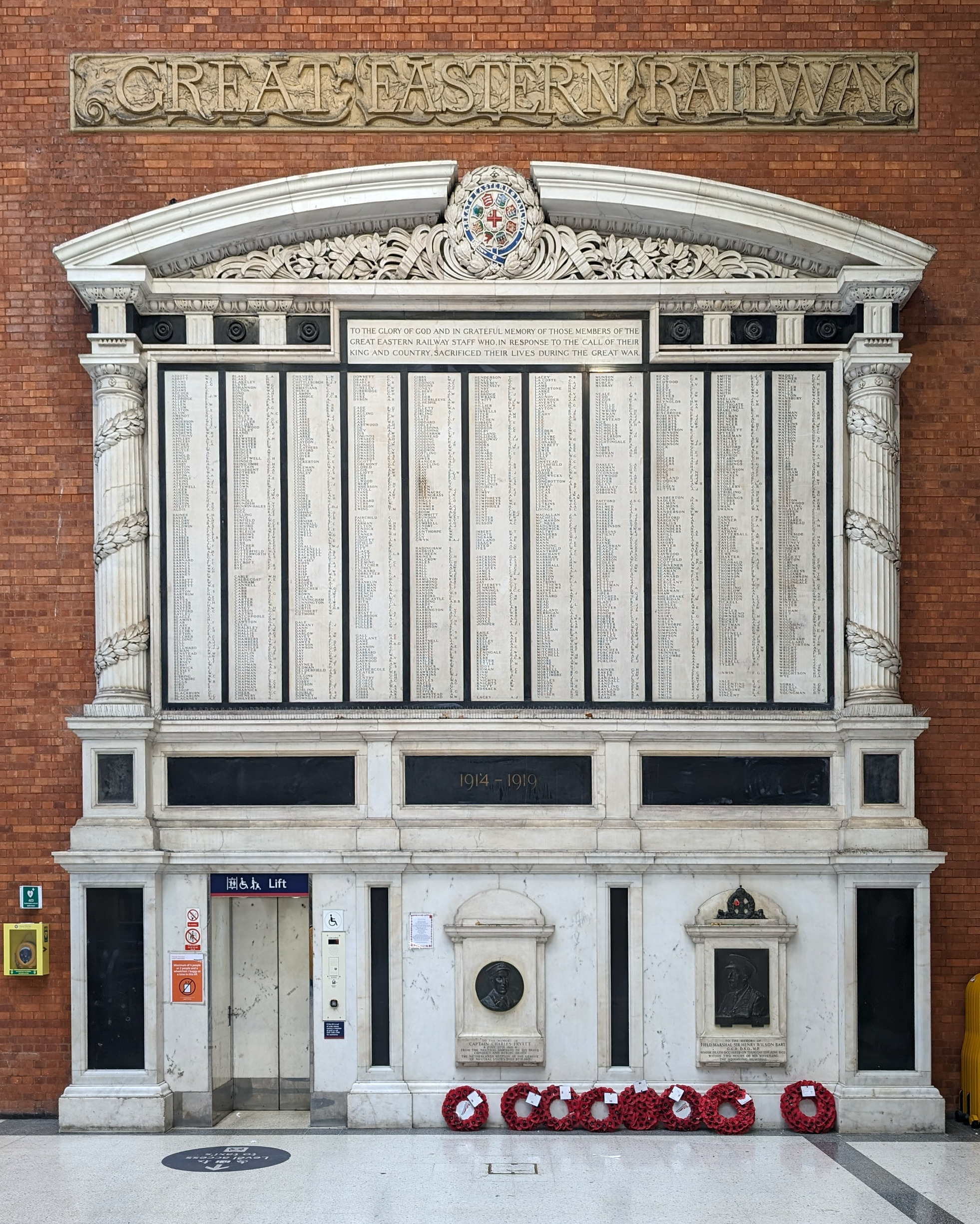
The 1922 Great Eastern Railway War Memorial

Operation Turkenkreuz, the initial First World War biplane air raid on London, took place on 13 June 1917, when 20 Gotha G.IV bombers attacked the capital. The raid struck a number of sites including Liverpool Street. Seven tons of explosives were dropped on the capital, killing 162 people and injuring 432. Three bombs hit the station, of which two exploded, having fallen through the train shed roof, near to two trains. One of these hit a carriage on a train about to depart, another hit carriages used by army doctors; the death toll at the station itself was 16 dead and 15 injured. It was the deadliest single raid on Britain during the war.

Over 1,000 GER employees who died during the war were honoured on a large marble memorial installed in the booking hall, unveiled on 22 June 1922 by Sir Henry Wilson. On his return home from the unveiling ceremony, Wilson was assassinated by two Irish Republican Army members. He was commemorated by a memorial plaque adjoining the GER monument, unveiled one month after his death. The GER memorial was relocated during the modification of the station and now incorporates both the Wilson and Fryatt memorials, as well as a number of railway related architectural elements salvaged from demolished buildings.

The station also has a plaque commemorating mariner Charles Fryatt who was executed in 1916 for ramming a German U-boat with the GER steamer SS Brussels.

==== "Big Four" (1923–1945) ====
By the early 1900s, the success of deep-bore electric trains on the Underground suggested that local services out of London could also be electrified. Following the war, the GER needed more capacity out of Liverpool Street as it was at capacity (serving almost 230,000 passengers daily in 1921), but they could not afford electrification. They considered high-powered and high-tractive steam locomotives including the GER Class A55 as a possible alternative, but these were rejected because of high track loadings.

An alternative scheme was introduced, using a combination of automatic signalling and modifications to the layout at Liverpool Street. The station introduced coaling, watering, and other maintenance facilities directly at the station, as well as separate engine bays and a modified track and station layout that reduced turnaround times and increased productivity. Services began on 2 July 1920 with trains to Chingford and Enfield running every 10 minutes. The cost of the modifications was £80,000 compared to an estimated £3 million for electrification. The service was officially called the Intensive Service (as it allowed a 50% increase in capacity on peak services), but became popularly known as the Jazz Service. It lasted until the General Strike of 1926, following which services generally declined.

The GER amalgamated with several other railways to form the London and North Eastern Railway (LNER) as part of the reorganisation of railway companies in 1923. Liverpool Street came under ownership of the LNER, and suffered from a general lack of attention and neglect throughout the 1930s.

===== Station staff 1935 =====
The station master in 1935 was H C R Calver and he had 395 staff under him with his direct reports, including ticket office, parcels staff, signalmen, platform inspectors and porters. Of this number, 75 were passed for fogging duties for when additional staff were required for safe operation of trains in foggy conditions.

In addition to this there were many other staff employed at the station on a variety of duties including policemen (uniformed and plain clothes), locomotive staff, permanent way staff, carriage and wagon examiners, steam heat examiners, electric and gas examiners, telegraph staff, linemen, signal fitters, Goods Manager's Despatch Office staff, outside porters, hotel porters, staff from the continental office and GPO staff.

The former headquarters building of the GER (still a railway office in 1935) was adjacent to Liverpool Street and some departments in that building also had roles in the operation of the station.

Further to that the newspaper companies provided their own staff to load newspaper trains. (Note: H C R Calver gave a talk to a meeting of the L.N.E.R. (London) Lecture & Debating Society on 6 December 1935. The material in this section and below was part of that talk.)

===== Signal box operation 1935 =====
In 1935 the approaches to Liverpool Street and the station itself, were controlled by seven signal boxes, which fell under the responsibility of the Liverpool Street station master. The boxes were:

- East London Junction - this was primarily for traffic to and from the East London Line and in 1935 a route onto the Southern Railway via Whitechapel
- Bishopsgate North - this box controlled the suburban line only; it was situated on the former (closed 1916) Bishopsgate Low Level down suburban platform.
- Bishopsgate South - stood on the former Down Local platform of Bishopsgate Low Level and controlled traffic on the Local and Through lines.
- Liverpool Street West - was the controlling box for the station working. All trains were block signalled, irrespective of whether they were running into the west or east side of the station. The box had 203 active levers and 37 spare and during the busiest period of the day there were six signalmen on duty along with a telephone and booking lad. A train to Liverpool Street East Box would be block signalled from the West box.
- Liverpool Street East - situated at the country end of Platform 11; it had 127 active and 9 spare levers, and controlled traffic passing on or off the Local or Through lines, into or out of platforms 11 to 18. Departing trains would be despatched to the west box.
- The remaining two signal boxes were platform boxes whose purpose was to electrically lock a platform out when a train had arrived in it. The platform would not be freed (so other trains could not be routed into it) until all the vehicles brought into it were cleared and the platform was again ready for another train to be accepted. These boxes were located at the country ends of Platform 4/5 and 14/15.

===== Second World War =====
Thousands of Jewish refugee children arrived at Liverpool Street in the late 1930s as part of the Kindertransport rescue mission to save them in the run up to the Second World War. The Für Das Kind Kindertransport Memorial sculpture by artist Flor Kent was installed at the station in September 2003 commemorating this event. It consisted of a specialised glass case with original objects and a bronze sculpture of a girl, a direct descendant of a child rescued by Nicholas Winton, who unveiled the work. The objects included in the sculpture began to deteriorate in bad weather, and a replacement bronze memorial, Kindertransport – The Arrival by Frank Meisler was installed as a replacement at the main entrance in November 2006. The child statue from the Kent memorial was re-erected separately in 2011.

During the war, the station's structure sustained damage from a nearby bomb, particularly the Gothic tower at the main entrance on Liverpool Street and its glass roof.

As a precautionary measure the large and weighty West Side hanging clock was brought down to platform level and served as an enquiry office for the duration of the war.

==== Post War (1946–1991) ====
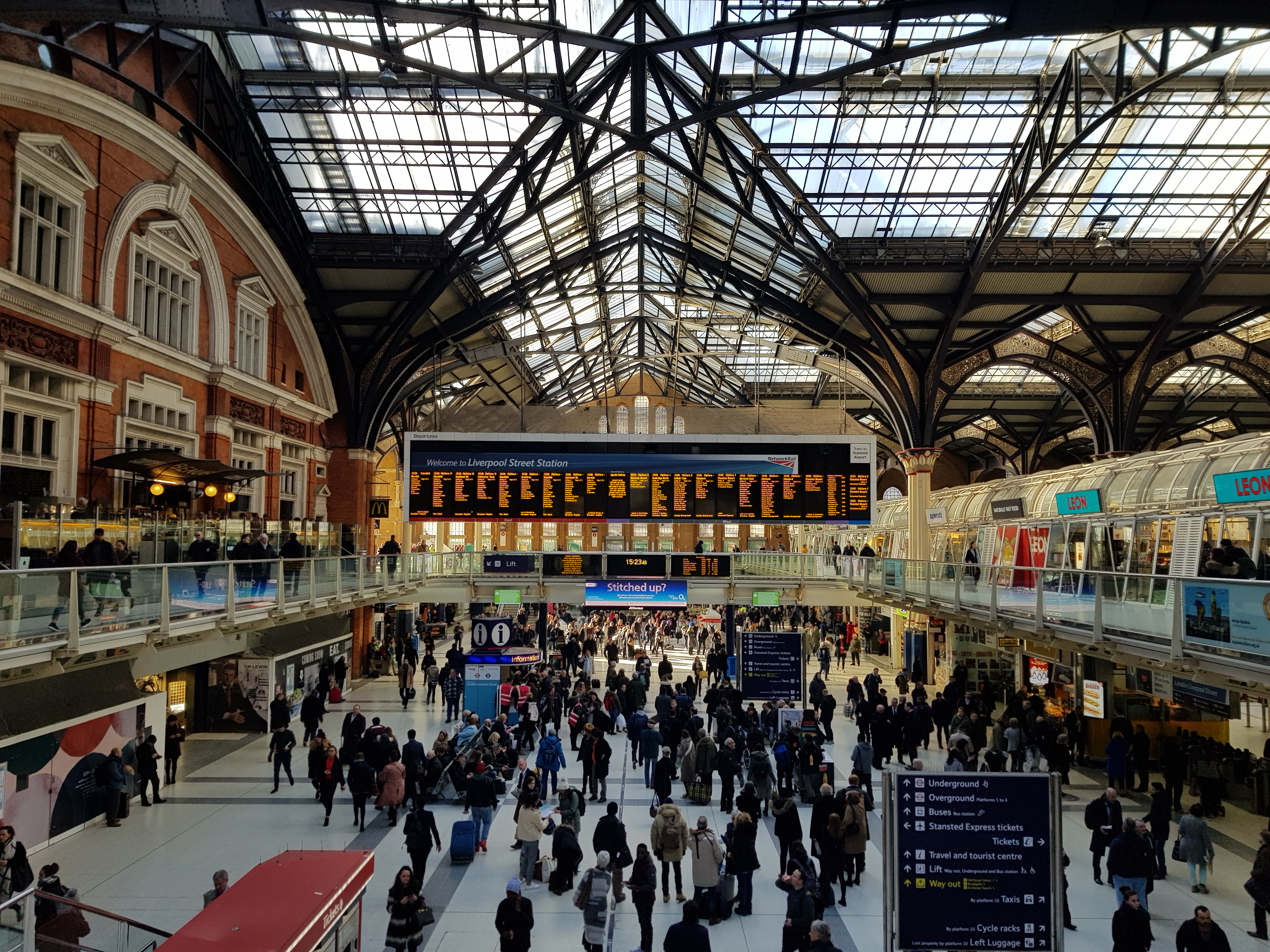
Interior view of the station

After the formation of the London Passenger Transport Board in 1933, work to electrify the line from Liverpool Street to Shenfield began in association with the LNER. Progress had been halted by the war but work resumed after the end of hostilities. The line between Liverpool Street and Stratford was electrified from 3 December 1946, and the full electrification of the Shenfield line at 1500 V DC was completed in September 1949. At the same time, electrification of London Underground services in Essex and in northeast and east London led to the withdrawal of some services from Liverpool Street, being replaced with LU operations. Electrification continued with the line to Chingford electrified by November 1960. In 1960–61, the overhead electrification, which had been extended from Shenfield to Southend and Chelmsford, was converted from 1500 V DC to 6.25 kV AC.

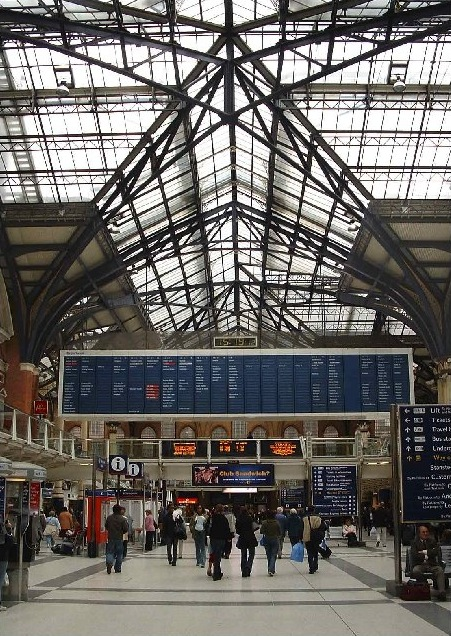
The split-flap display board, which was replaced in 2007

In 1973 the British Railways Board, London Transport Executive, Greater London Council and the Department of the Environment produced a report examining the modernisation of London transport. It recommended high priority given to reconstructing Liverpool Street and Broad Street stations and recommended financing this through property development on the site. Liverpool Street had a number of design and access issues, many of which derived from the 1890 extension which had effectively created two stations on one site, with two concourses linked by walkways, booking halls, and inefficient traffic flows within the station. Additionally the rail infrastructure presented limitations; only seven of the platforms could accommodate 12-carriage trains, and the track exit layout was a bottleneck. In 1975 British Railways announced plans to demolish and redevelop both stations. The proposed demolition met considerable public opposition and prompted a campaign led by the Poet Laureate Sir John Betjeman, leading to a public inquiry from November 1976 to February 1977.

In autumn 1980, the overhead electrification was converted from 6.25 kV AC to the standard supply of 25 kV AC. The inquiry recommended that the western (1875) train shed roof should be retained in new development; consequently it was repaired and reinforced between 1982 and 1984, followed by repairs to the main roof completed in 1987. Initial plans included adding two additional tracks, with 22 platforms in a layout similar to that of Waterloo station; the combined Broad Street and Liverpool Street station was to be at the level of the latter, with relatively low-rise office developments. The development was reassessed in 1983/4, when it was decided to retain the existing six-road exit throat and 18-platform layout, in combination with resignalling; this resulted in a station confined to the Liverpool Street site, with ground space released for development. British Railways signed an agreement with developers Rosehaugh Stanhope in 1985, and work on the office development, known as Broadgate, began.

Railway work included the construction of a short link from the North London Line to the Cambridge main line, allowing trains that had previously used Broad Street to terminate at Liverpool Street. The station was reconstructed with a single concourse at the head of the station platforms, and entrances from Bishopsgate and Liverpool Street, as well as a bus interchange in the south west corner. The Broadgate development was constructed between 1985 and 1991, with 330,000 m^{2} (3,600,000 sq ft) of office space on the site of the former Broad Street station and above the Liverpool Street tracks. Proceeds from the Broadgate development were used to help fund the station modernisation.

In 1988, The Arcade above the underground station on the corner of Liverpool Street and Old Broad Street was due to be completely demolished by London Regional Transport and MEPC, who wanted to develop the site into a five-storey block of offices and shops. More than 6,000 people signed a petition to "Save the Arcade", and the historic Victorian building still stands today. The campaign against the development was led by Graham Horwood, who owned an employment agency within the Arcade at the time.

In 1989, the first visual display unit-controlled signalling operation on British Rail (known as an Integrated Electronic Control Centre) became operational at Liverpool Street.

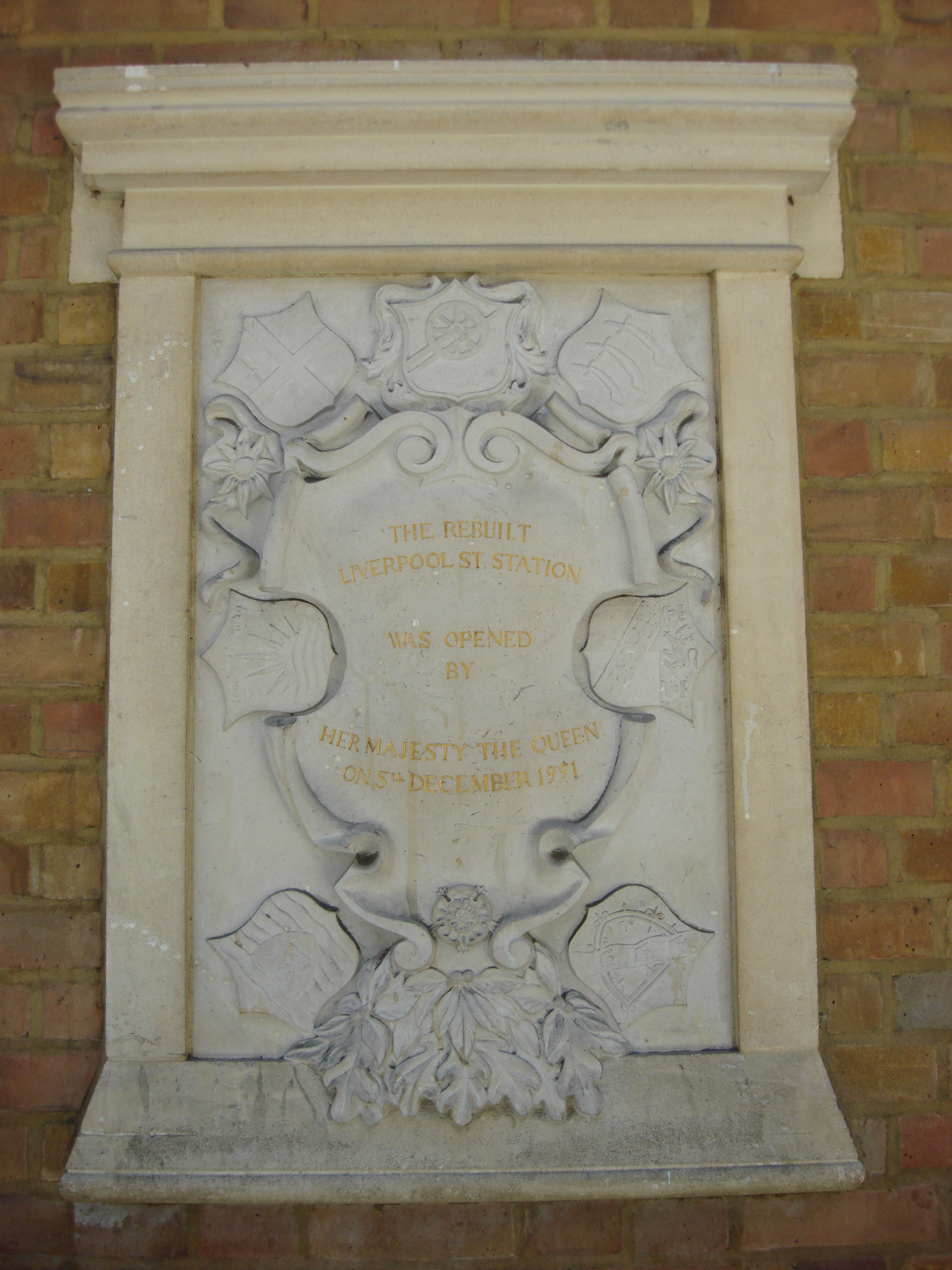
Plaque commemorating the opening of the rebuilt station in 1991

The redeveloped Liverpool Street was officially opened by Queen Elizabeth II on 5 December 1991. At that time a giant departures board was installed above the concourse; it was one of the last remaining mechanical 'flapper' display boards at a British railway station until its replacement in November 2007.

==== Recent history and privatisation (1991–present) ====
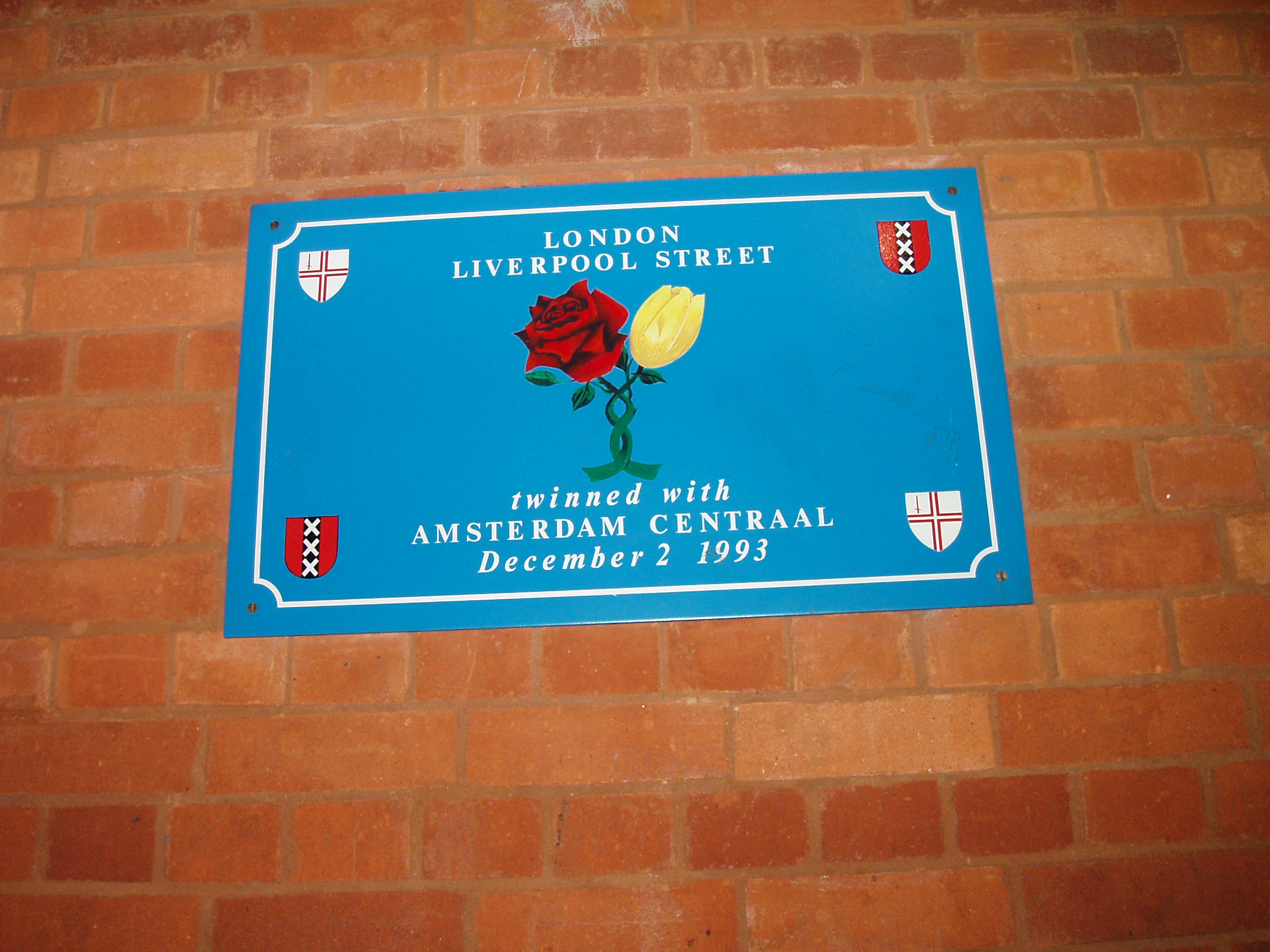
A plaque commemorating the twinning of Liverpool Street and Amsterdam Centraal stations

In 1991, an additional entrance was constructed on the east side of Bishopsgate with a subway under the road. The station was "twinned" with Amsterdam Centraal railway station on 2 December 1993, with a plaque marking this close to the entrance to the Underground station.

The station was badly damaged on 24 April 1993 by the Bishopsgate bombing and was temporarily closed as a result. About £250,000 of damage was caused to the station, primarily to the glass roof. The station re-opened on 26 April 1993.

In 2013, during excavation work for the Crossrail project, a 2-acre (0.8 ha) mass burial ground dating from the 17th century was uncovered a few feet beneath the surface at Liverpool Street, the so-called Bedlam burial ground or New Churchyard. It contained the remains of several hundred people and it is thought that the interments were of a wide variety of people, including plague victims, prisoners and unclaimed corpses. A 16th-century gold coin, thought to have been used as a sequin or pendant, was also found. In early 2015 full-scale excavation of the burials began, then estimated at 3,000 interments.

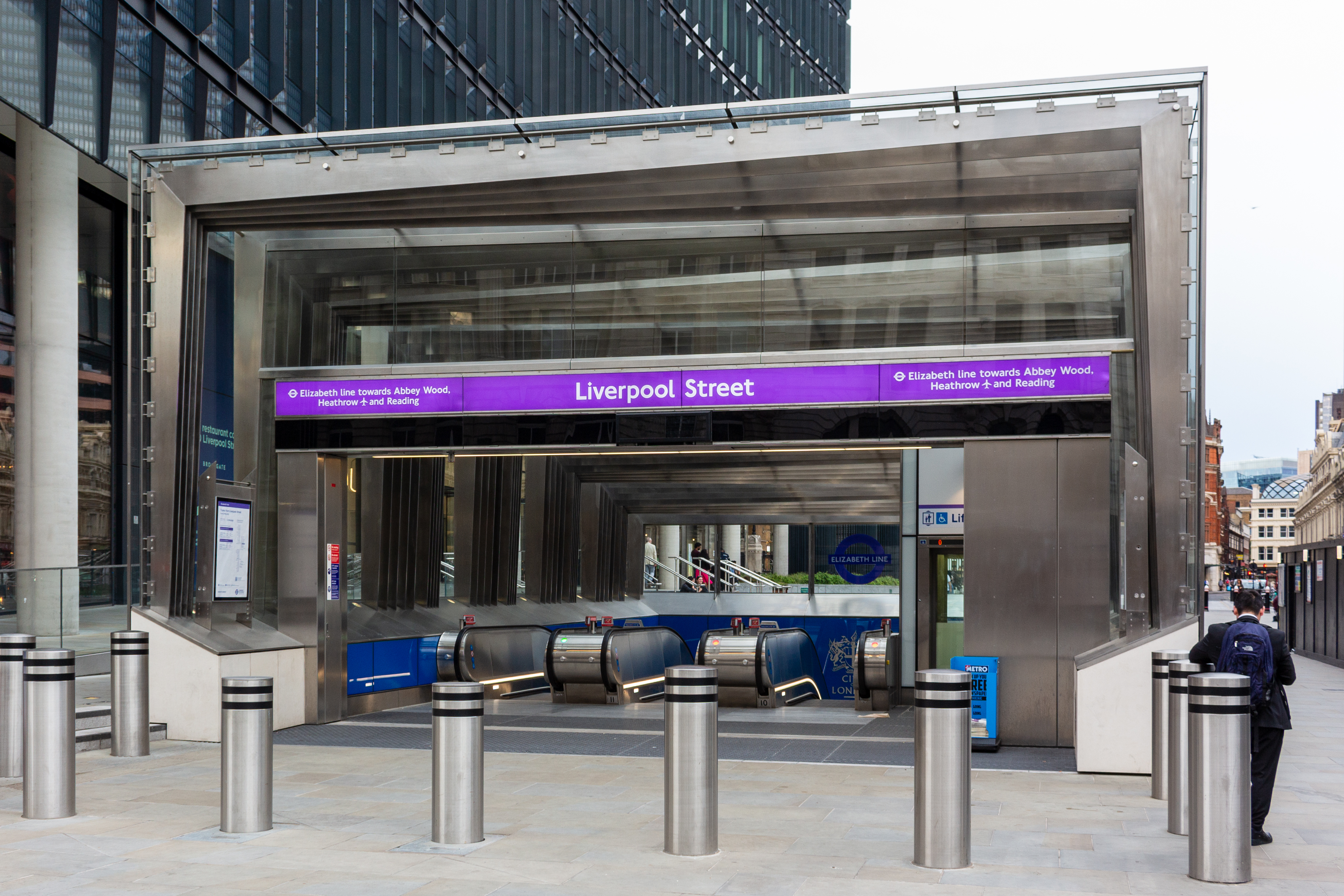
The Elizabeth line entrance at Liverpool Street

In advance of the full opening of the Elizabeth line, precursor operator TfL Rail took over from Greater Anglia the Liverpool Street-Shenfield stopping "metro" service from 2015. At the same time, services on the Lea Valley Lines out of Liverpool Street to Enfield Town, Cheshunt (via Seven Sisters) and Chingford transferred to London Overground. The central section of the Elizabeth line opened on 24 May 2022 between Paddington and Abbey Wood. The Elizabeth line platforms are to the south-west of the existing tube station building. A new ticket hall with step-free access opened next to the Broadgate development, with links to the existing Underground station, and a pedestrian link via the new platforms to the ticket hall of Moorgate, providing direct access to London Underground's Northern line and the National Rail Northern City Line at Moorgate. Thus, Liverpool Street appears on the Tube map as an interchange with Moorgate, similarly to Bank and Monument.

=== Services ===
In the 12 months to 31 March 2020, immediately before travel restrictions were introduced as a result of the COVID-19 pandemic, Liverpool Street was the third-busiest railway station in the United Kingdom, after London Waterloo and London Victoria, with an estimated 66 million passenger entries and exits. Patronage fell by 83% in the 12 months to 31 March 2021, to 11.2 million entries and exits, as a result of the pandemic.

In 2022 / 2023, it was ranked as the busiest station in the UK, with 80.4 million entries and exits, the increase being attributed to the opening of the Elizabeth line in May 2022.

Trains depart from the main line station for destinations across the east of England, including Norwich, Southminster, Ipswich, Clacton-on-Sea, Colchester, Chelmsford, Southend Victoria, Cambridge, Harlow Town, Hertford East, Broxbourne and many suburban stations in north and east London, Essex and Hertfordshire. A few daily express trains to Harwich International provide a connection with the Dutchflyer ferry to Hook of Holland. Stansted Express trains provide a link to Stansted Airport and Southend Victoria-bound services stop at Southend Airport.

Most passenger services on the Great Eastern Main Line are operated by Greater Anglia. Since 2015, the Shenfield stopping service has been operated by Transport for London (first under the TfL Rail brand, now the Elizabeth line), and the Lea Valley Lines to Enfield Town, Cheshunt (via Seven Sisters) and Chingford are operated by London Overground (now under the Weaver line name). A small number of late-evening and weekend services operated by c2c run via Barking. The station is split into two “halves”: the "west" side for the Lea Valley Lines services and the "east" side for services via Shenfield.

Trains on the central section of the Elizabeth line run west towards Paddington and east to Abbey Wood in south-east London.

The typical off-peak weekday service pattern from Liverpool Street is:

Operator	Line	Destination	Intermediate stations	Rolling stock	Frequency	Note
Elizabeth line	Elizabeth line	Heathrow Terminal 5	Farringdon – Tottenham Court Road – Bond Street – Paddington – Acton Main Line – Ealing Broadway – West Ealing – Hanwell – Southall – Hayes & Harlington – Heathrow Terminals 2 & 3	Class 345	2 per hour	
Elizabeth line	Elizabeth line	Heathrow Terminal 4	Farringdon – Tottenham Court Road – Bond Street – Paddington – Acton Main Line – Ealing Broadway – West Ealing – Hanwell – Southall – Hayes & Harlington – Heathrow Terminals 2 & 3	Class 345	4 per hour	
Elizabeth line	Elizabeth line	Reading	Farringdon – Tottenham Court Road – Bond Street – Paddington – Ealing Broadway – Southall – Hayes & Harlington – West Drayton – Langley – Slough – Burnham – Taplow – Maidenhead – Twyford	Class 345	2 per hour	
Elizabeth line	Elizabeth line	Maidenhead	Farringdon – Tottenham Court Road – Bond Street – Paddington – Ealing Broadway – Southall – Hayes & Harlington – West Drayton – Iver – Langley – Slough – Burnham	Class 345	2 per hour	
Elizabeth line	Elizabeth line	Paddington	Farringdon – Tottenham Court Road – Bond Street	Class 345	6 per hour	
Elizabeth line	Elizabeth line	Abbey Wood	Whitechapel – Canary Wharf – Custom House – Woolwich	Class 345	8 per hour	
Elizabeth line	Elizabeth line	Shenfield	Whitechapel – Stratford – Maryland – Forest Gate – Manor Park – Ilford – Seven Kings – Goodmayes – Chadwell Heath – Romford – Gidea Park – Harold Wood – Brentwood	Class 345	8 per hour	
Greater Anglia	GEML	Southend Victoria	Stratford – Shenfield – Billericay – Wickford – Rayleigh – Hockley – Rochford – Southend Airport – Prittlewell	Class 720	3 per hour	2 call additionally at Romford
Greater Anglia	GEML	Norwich	Stratford – Colchester – Manningtree – Ipswich – Stowmarket – Diss	Class 745	1 per hour	
Greater Anglia	GEML	Norwich	Chelmsford – Colchester – Manningtree – Ipswich – Stowmarket – Diss	Class 745	1 per hour	
Greater Anglia	GEML	Ipswich	Stratford – Shenfield – Chelmsford – Hatfield Peverel – Witham – Kelvedon – Marks Tey – Colchester – Manningtree	Class 720	1 per hour	
Greater Anglia	GEML	Clacton-on-Sea	Stratford – Shenfield – Ingatestone – Chelmsford – Witham – Colchester – Wivenhoe – Thorpe-le-Soken	Class 720	1 per hour	
Greater Anglia	GEML	Colchester Town	Stratford – Shenfield – Ingatestone – Chelmsford – Witham – Kelvedon – Marks Tey – Colchester	Class 720	1 per hour	
Greater Anglia	GEML	Braintree	Stratford – Shenfield – Ingatestone – Chelmsford – Witham – White Notley – Cressing – Braintree Freeport	Class 720	1 per hour	
London Overground (Weaver line)	WAML	Chingford	Bethnal Green – Hackney Downs – Clapton – St James Street – Walthamstow Central – Wood Street – Highams Park	Class 710	4 per hour	
London Overground (Weaver line)	WAML	Cheshunt	Bethnal Green – Cambridge Heath – London Fields – Hackney Downs – Rectory Road – Stoke Newington – Stamford Hill – Seven Sisters – Bruce Grove – White Hart Lane – Silver Street – Edmonton Green – Southbury – Turkey Street – Theobald Grove	Class 710	2 per hour	
London Overground (Weaver line)	WAML	Enfield Town	Bethnal Green – Cambridge Heath – London Fields – Hackney Downs – Rectory Road – Stoke Newington – Stamford Hill – Seven Sisters – Bruce Grove – White Hart Lane – Silver Street – Edmonton Green – Bush Hill Park	Class 710	2 per hour	
Greater Anglia/Stansted Express	WAML	Stansted Airport	Tottenham Hale – Bishops Stortford	Class 745	2 per hour	1 calls additionally at Stansted Mountfitchet
Greater Anglia/Stansted Express	WAML	Stansted Airport	Tottenham Hale – Harlow Town	Class 745	2 per hour	
Greater Anglia	WAML	Hertford East	Hackney Downs – Tottenham Hale – Ponders End – Brimsdown – Enfield Lock – Waltham Cross – Cheshunt – Broxbourne – Rye House – St Margarets – Ware	Class 720	2 per hour	
Greater Anglia	WAML	Cambridge North	Tottenham Hale – Cheshunt – Broxbourne – Harlow Town – Bishops Stortford – Audley End – Whittlesford Parkway – Cambridge	Class 720	1 per hour	
Greater Anglia	WAML	Cambridge North	Tottenham Hale – Cheshunt – Broxbourne – Harlow Town – Harlow Mill – Sawbridgeworth – Bishops Stortford – Stansted Mountfitchet – Elsenham – Newport – Audley End – Great Chesterford – Whittlesford Parkway – Shelford – Cambridge	Class 720	1 per hour	

==== Service table ====
Preceding station	National Rail	Following station
Terminus	c2c London, Tilbury and Southend line Weekends only	Stratford
Terminus	Greater Anglia Great Eastern Main Line	Stratford
Terminus	Greater Anglia Lea Valley lines	Hackney Downs
Terminus	Greater Anglia West Anglia Main Line	Tottenham Hale
Terminus	Stansted Express Stansted Express	Tottenham Hale
Preceding station	Elizabeth line	Following station
Farringdon towards Reading or Heathrow Airport Terminal 4 or Terminal 5	Elizabeth line	Whitechapel towards Abbey Wood or Shenfield
Terminus	Elizabeth line	Stratford towards Shenfield
Preceding station	London Overground	Following station
Terminus	Weaver line Lea Valley lines	Bethnal Green towards Cheshunt, Chingford or Enfield Town
Disused railways
Terminus	Network SouthEast: North London Line; Peak Hours Only (1986–1992)	Dalston Kingsland Line disused, station open
Terminus	Great Eastern Railway Great Eastern Main Line	Bishopsgate (Low Level) Line open, station closed

=== Accidents and incidents ===
- On 2 January 1877, a locomotive was derailed due to a set of points being moved incorrectly.
- On 20 March 1880, a passenger train collided with the buffer stop at platform 10. Five passengers were slightly injured.
- On 16 November 1881, the first carriage of a 15-carriage passenger train operating a service from Enfield was derailed and overturned approaching the station. Seven passengers were slightly injured. The cause was insufficient packing at a set of three-way points.
- On 7 August 1885, the last carriage of a 15-carriage passenger train derailed and overturned departing the station on a service to Forest Gate. Seven passengers were slightly injured, a eighth sustained a broken wrist. The cause was a set of points moving under the train. They were not fitted with a facing point lock.
- On 28 September 1885, a carriage in a passenger train from Witham derailed and overturned. Twelve passengers were injured. The accident was caused by the accidental operationg of a set of point as the train was passing over them.
- On 1 December 1888, a passenger train from Loughton derailed at the station. No injuries were reported.
- On 24 February 1896, a passenger train from Romford collided with the buffer stop at platform 16. Five passengers were slightly injured. The cause was driver error.
- On 13 April 1920, a passenger train from Wood Street ran into the rear of a passenger train from Enfield Town. Three passengers sustained minor injuries. The locomotive of the train from Wood Street had derailed on a set of points, leaving it foul of the train on an adjacent line.
- On 27 July 1922, a passenger train from Brentwood collided with the buffer stop at platform 15. Seventy-seven of the 800 passengers were injured. The cause was driver error.
- On 13 April 1923, a passenger train from Chingford collided with the buffer stop at platform 4.One hundred and nine of the 800 passengers were injured. The cause was driver error.
- On 9 October 1923, a passenger train from Enfield collided with a light engine on approach to the station. Both locomotives and two carriages were derailed.
- On 9 May 1925, a passenger train from Chingford collided with a wagon which was being shunted. Six of the eight carriages and the wagon were derailed. One passenger was slightly injured. The cause was signalman's error.
- On 4 February 1928, a passenger train from Chingford derailed approaching the station. There were no reports of injuries.
- On 3 July 1929, a passenger train from Gidea Park collided with the buffer stop at platform 13. At least three passengers were injured.
- On 14 May 1930, a passenger train from Chingford collided with the buffer stop at platform 4. Thirty-two of the 150 passengers were injured. The cause was driver error.
- On 28 November 1934, a passenger train to Wood Street was in a sidelong collision with a passenger train from Enfield Town. No injuries were reported. The cause was a lack of interlocking of the signals due to inadequate maintenance.
- On 5 March 1936, a passenger train from Brentwood collided with a light engine. A fireman was slightly injured.
- On 31 August 1937, a passenger train from Shenfield collided with the buffer stop in platform 12. Thirty-two passengers were injured.
- On 4 February 2010, a passenger train operated by British Rail Class 317 electric multiple units 317 505 and 317 508 operating a service to Chingford departed from the station with all the doors on one side of the train open. The cause was that the train had entered service with the traction interlock switch isolated.
- On 23 January 2013, a passenger train operating a service to Norwich derailed leaving the station, then rerailed itself as short distance later. The cause was a track defect.
- On 2 October 2022, an engineering train ran away from platform 3 and stopped a short distance later. The cause was driver error.
- On 15 October 2026, a Class 710 train, unit 710 112, collided with the buffer stop on platform 1 and derailed.

== London Underground station ==
Liverpool Street
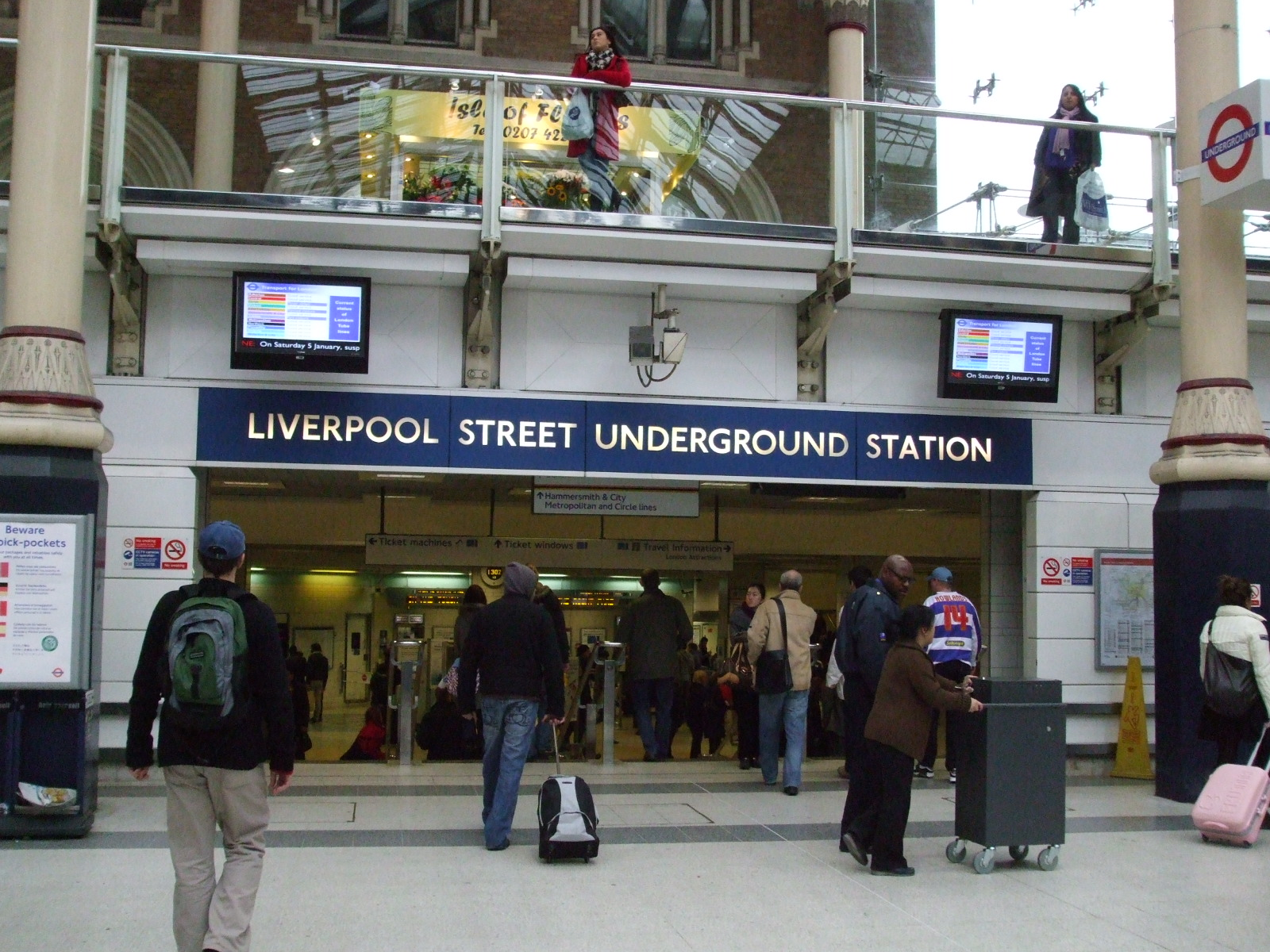
- Entrance from the main concourse at Liverpool Street

General information
- Location: Bishopsgate
- Local authority: City of London
- Managed by: London Underground
- Owner: Transport for London
- Number of platforms: 4
- Accessible: Yes(Sub-surface eastbound platform only)
- Fare zone: 1
- Cycle parking: Yes (platform 10 & external)

London Underground annual entry and exit
- 2021: ▲26.60 million
- 2022: ▲55.84 million
- 2023: ▲57.23 million
- 2024: ▲58.63 million
- 2025: ▲60.08 million

Key dates
- 12 July 1875: Opened as Bishopsgate
- 1 November 1909: Renamed Liverpool Street
- 28 July 1912: Central line (London Underground) opened (terminus)
- 4 December 1946: Central line extended (through)

Other information
- External links: TfL station info page

=== Services ===
On the London Underground, Liverpool Street is on the Central, Circle, Hammersmith & City and Metropolitan lines, and is the sixth-busiest station on the network. On the Central line, the station is between Bank and Bethnal Green stations. On the Circle and Metropolitan lines, it is between Moorgate and Aldgate stations. On the Hammersmith & City line, it is between Moorgate and Aldgate East stations. In common with other tube stations serving Central London termini, this station is in fare zone 1. There is no wheelchair access to the tube lines, except from the eastbound Circle, Hammersmith & City and Metropolitan lines, which have a ramp leading to the platform.

Preceding station	London Underground	Following station
Bank towards Ealing Broadway or West Ruislip	Central line	Bethnal Green towards Epping, Hainault or Woodford via Newbury Park
Moorgate towards Hammersmith via King's Cross St Pancras	Circle line	Aldgate towards Edgware Road via Victoria
Moorgate towards Hammersmith via King's Cross St Pancras	Hammersmith & City line	Aldgate East towards Barking
Moorgate towards Uxbridge, Amersham, Chesham or Watford	Metropolitan line	Aldgate Terminus
Former services
Preceding station	London Underground	Following station
Moorgate towards Hammersmith	Metropolitan line Hammersmith branch (1864–1990)	Aldgate East towards Barking

=== History ===
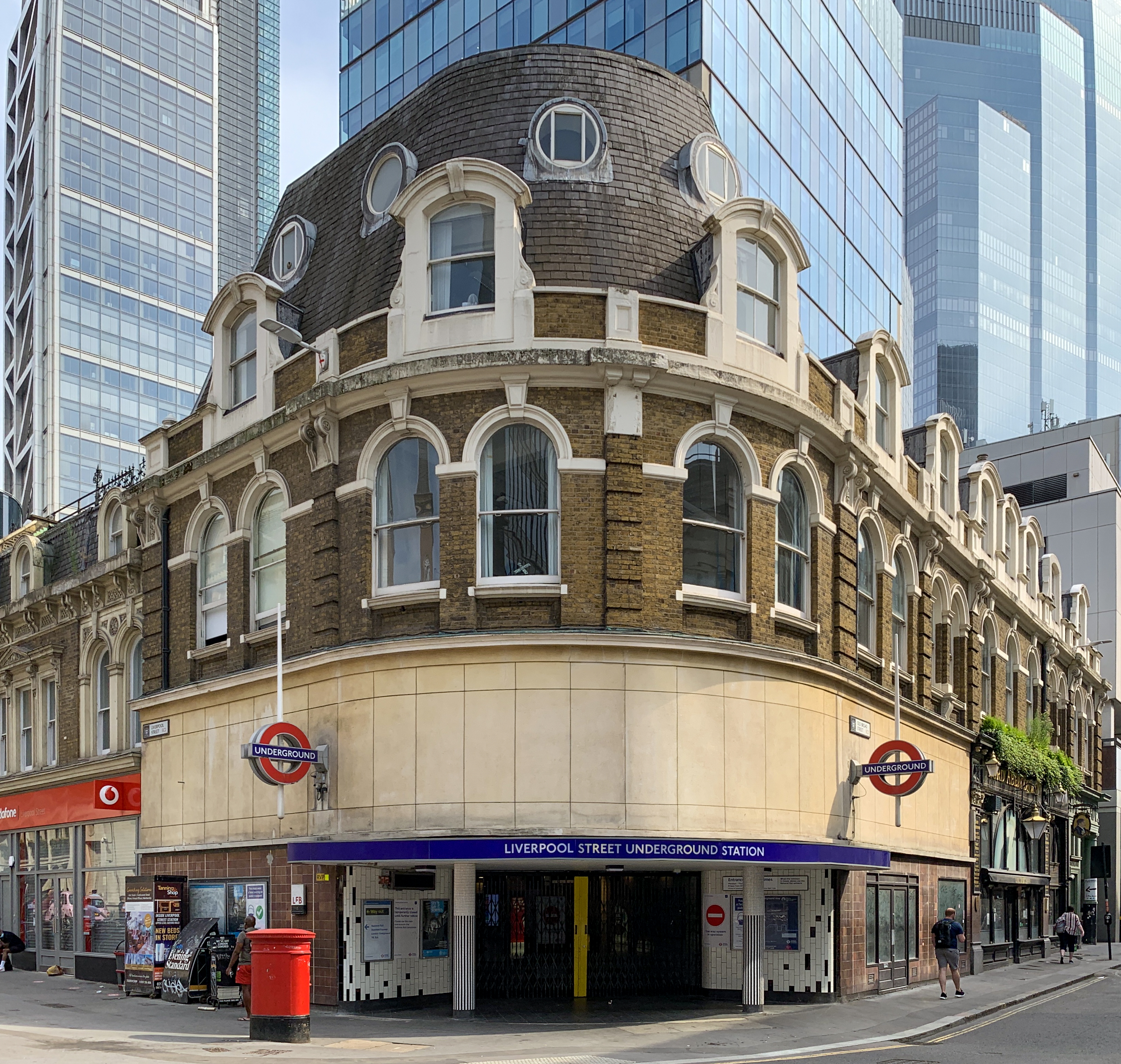
Street entrance to the Underground station

Liverpool Street had been designed to integrate with the expanding London Underground network, and served as a new terminus for the Metropolitan Railway (MR) which extended east from Moorgate. From 1874 to 1875, the MR used the Liverpool Street main line station as a terminus; the company opened its own station on 12 July 1875, initially named Bishopsgate. Subsurface platforms 1 and 2 were opened in 1875. A west-facing bay platform, platform 3, was formerly located to the south of platform 2; this was used by terminating Metropolitan line trains from the west. It was in use by 1896, and was still in use in 1974, but was redundant by 1994.

The underground station was renamed Liverpool Street on 1 November 1909. (Note: An additional, smaller station called Bishopsgate (Low Level) existed on the main line just outside of Liverpool Street from 1872 until 1916.) In 1912, after the completion of an extension project from Bank, the underground station became a new terminus of the Central London Railway (CLR). The platforms that are now the deep-level Central line platforms 4 and 5 opened as the eastern terminus of the CLR on 28 July 1912. The tube station was one of the first to use the Moore Vacuum Tube, a new system of lighting that produced three times as much as a normal bulb.

The tube station became one of the principal shelters during the Blitz. The station was not initially open to the public as a shelter, but during heavy raids on the East End on 7 September 1940, many sought refuge at the station, which was the safest and most practical shelter for many. Some sources suggest that the local people forced entry, others that staff decided to open the gates to everyone without asking for tickets, something which would have been technically illegal.

On 4 December 1946, the passenger line was extended eastwards as part of the war-delayed London Passenger Transport Board's New Works Programme. An Underground ticket hall was added in 1951.

During the 7 July 2005 terrorist attacks on London, a bomb was exploded aboard an Underground train that had departed Liverpool Street toward Aldgate. Seven passengers were killed.

== London Post Office Railway station ==
The Liverpool Street Post Office Railway station is a disused station that was operated by Royal Mail on the London Post Office Railway system.

The station is between Mount Pleasant Mail Centre and Whitechapel Eastern District Post Office, and is situated at the south end of Liverpool Street under the Great Eastern Hotel. It opened in December 1927; lifts on either side of the station as well as chutes enabled the transfer of mail to and from the main station. Two 315-foot (96 m) parcel and letter bag conveyors were connected to platforms 10 and 11 (currently used by Greater Anglia); postal traffic reached 10,000 bags daily in the 1930s, with 690 Post Office services calling. The system was discontinued in 2003.

In 2014, a team from the University of Cambridge began conducting a study in a short, double track section of unused tunnel near the platforms where a newly built tunnel for Crossrail is situated almost two metres beneath. The study is to establish how the original cast-iron lining sections, which are similar to those used for many miles of railway under London, resist possible deformation and soil movement caused by the developments.

== Future developments ==
=== London Underground ===
The Central line runs directly below Shoreditch High Street on the London Overground's Windrush line and an interchange has been desired locally in neighbouring Shoreditch since it opened in 2010. The new platforms would lie between Bethnal Green and Liverpool Street on one of the longest gaps between stations in inner London. Although there would be benefits to this interchange, it was ruled out on grounds of cost, the disruption it would cause to the Central line while being built, and because the platforms would be too close to sidings at Liverpool Street; the proposal will not be reconsidered until after the Elizabeth line is fully operational.

=== Freight trial ===
A freight trial between Liverpool Street and London Gateway was planned to start in April or May 2020, using a Class 769 bi-mode train.

== Redevelopment of mainline station ==
In 2023, Network Rail and architects Herzog & de Meuron unveiled plans for a large-scale redevelopment of the mainline station to cope with an expected growth in passenger numbers, The plans included the construction of an office block on top of the station, resulting in the loss of part of the 1985-91 train shed roof and the brick entrances and clock towers on Bishopsgate and Liverpool Street. The plans were opposed by a number of heritage groups, including the Victorian Society and Save Britain's Heritage.

In February 2026, the City of London Corporation approved a scaled-down version of the scheme, with the office block reduced in height from 108 metres to 97 metres and the train shed roof remaining "completely untouched". The project was expected to cost £1.2 billion, with the redevelopment of the station taking four years followed by a further three and half years for the office construction. The approval is subject to confirmation from the Mayor of London's office.

== Cultural references ==
Liverpool Street is one of the four railway stations present on the British version of Monopoly, along with King's Cross, Fenchurch Street and Marylebone. All four stations were termini of LNER services when Victor Watson redesigned the game for the British market in 1936.

The station features in several fictional terrorist attacks: in Andy McNab's novel Dark Winter the station is the target of an attack; in London Under Attack, a 2004 Panorama docu-drama portrayal of a terrorist attack on London using chlorine gas; and the drama Dirty War (2004) portrayed a suicide terrorist attack using a "dirty bomb" near the Underground station.

The station has also been used as a backdrop for a number of other film and television productions, including espionage films Stormbreaker (2006) and Mission: Impossible (1996), and crime drama The Shadow Line (2011), as well as the site for staged flash mobs in the film St. Trinian's 2: The Legend of Fritton's Gold (2009), and for a T-Mobile advert.

In the music video for "Taxloss" by Mansun, directed by Roman Coppola, £25,000 in £5 notes was dropped onto commuters at the station.

H. G. Wells's 1898 novel The War of The Worlds included a chaotic rush to board trains at Liverpool Street as the Martian machines overran military defences in the West End.

The station is the subject of the poem "Liverpool Street Station" by John Davidson. (1857–1909)

Through crystal roofs the sunlight fell,
And pencilled beams the gloss renewed
On iron rafters balanced well
On iron struts; though dimly hued.
With smoke o'erlaid, with dust endued.
The walls and beams like beryl shone;
And dappled light the platforms strewed
With yellow foliage of the dawn
That withered by the porch of day's divan.

— John Davidson, Fleet Street and Other Poems (Extract).

== See also ==
- Liverpool Street signal box
