= Bethnal Green railway station =

London Overground railway station

Bethnal Green
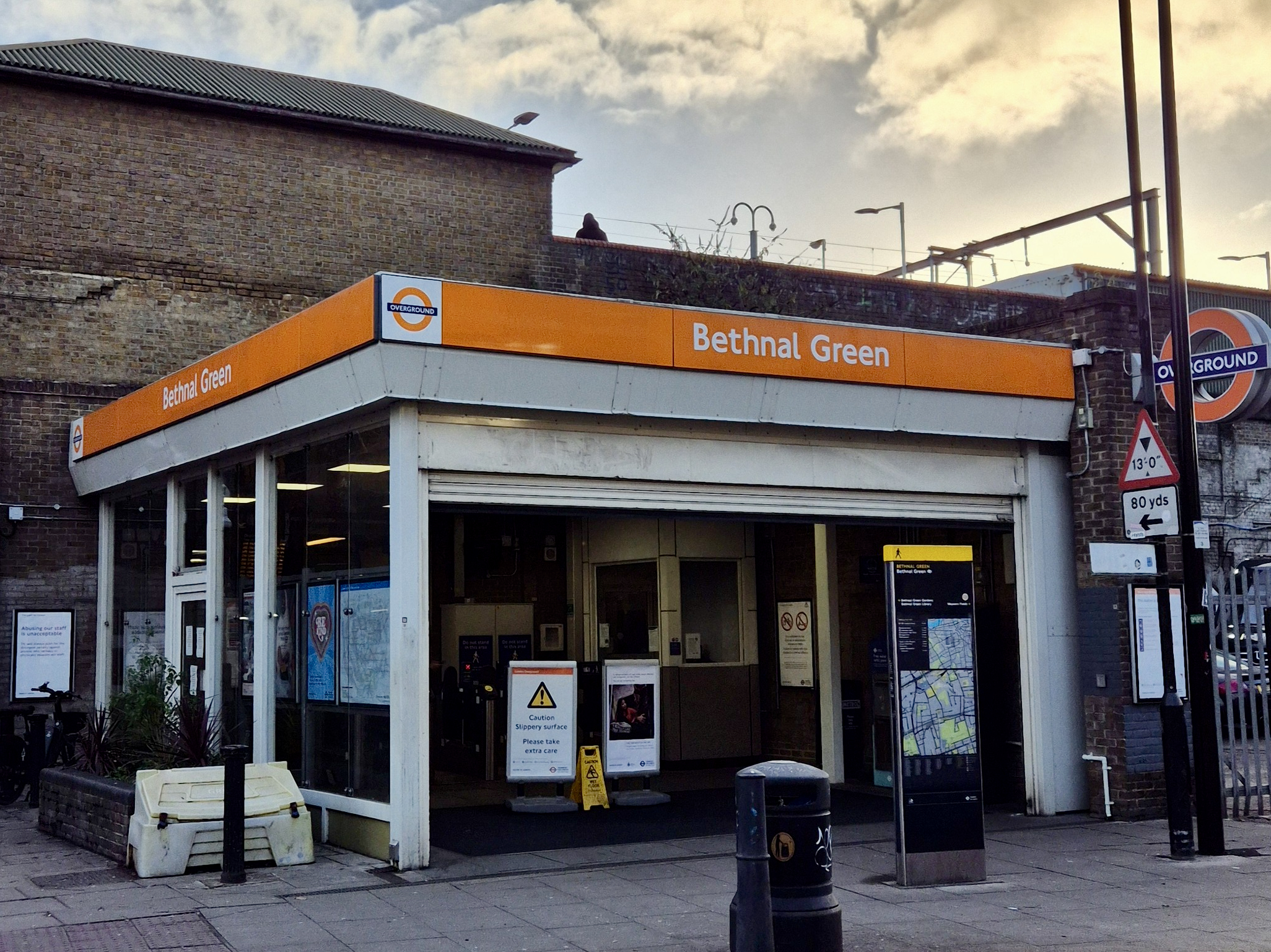
- The station entrance in December 2025
- Interactive map of Bethnal Green

General information
- Location: Bethnal Green
- Local authority: London Borough of Tower Hamlets
- Managed by: London Overground
- Owner: Network Rail
- Station code: BET
- DfT category: F1
- Number of platforms: 2
- Fare zone: 2

National Rail annual entry and exit
- 2020–21: ▼0.550 million
- 2021–22: ▲1.150 million
- 2022–23: ▲1.331 million
- 2023–24: ▲1.687 million
- 2024–25: ▼1.564 million

Key dates
- 27 May 1872: Opened
- 8 December 1946: Great Eastern Main Line platforms closed

Other information
- External links: Departures; Facilities
- Coordinates: 51.523°N 0.059°W

Bethnal Green is a railway station on the Weaver line of the London Overground, located in the southern part of Bethnal Green in East London. The station is 1 mile 10 chains (1.8 kilometres) down the line from London Liverpool Street; the next station is either Hackney Downs (on the Chingford branch) or Cambridge Heath (on the route to Cheshunt and Enfield Town).

The station was opened in 1872 and was called Bethnal Green Junction until 1946; it was also formerly served by trains on the Great Eastern Main Line (GEML) via Stratford. The station is situated on Three Colts Lane and is within walking distance to Bethnal Green Road via Wilmot Street. It is some distance from the other Bethnal Green station on the London Underground's Central line.

== History ==
=== Before opening ===
The first railway in the Bethnal Green area was opened by the Eastern Counties Railway (ECR). The ECR had opened its line from Romford to a temporary terminus at Devonshire Street. Their new terminus at Spitalfields was completed on 1 July 1840 and the line opened through Bethnal Green. As well as passenger facilities at Spitalfields, there were goods facilities adjacent to the line from the Bethnal Green site to the terminus.

By the 1860s, the railways in East Anglia were in financial trouble and most operations were leased to the ECR; they wished to amalgamate formally, but could not obtain government agreement for this until 1862, when the Great Eastern Railway (GER) was formed by amalgamation. The main line past the site then became a GER line in 1862.

=== Great Eastern Railway (1872–1922) ===
By the early to mid-1860s, it was clear the original Bishopsgate terminus (Note: Renamed from Spitalfields in 1846.) was not big enough to cope with the increasing suburban development north and east of the area. Hence, the GER decided to build a new terminus at Liverpool Street and extend the suburban network. A new line running north from the Bethnal Green site to Enfield Town was opened in May 1872 and from Hackney Downs to Chingford a month later. Both these openings meant that trains from the north were no longer required to be routed via Stratford which was also becoming an increasingly congested location at the time.

It was as part of this expansion that Bethnal Green Junction was opened in May 1872. It replaced a nearby station called Mile End (Note: Not to be confused with the current underground station of the same name.) which was located on the eastern side of Cambridge Heath Road.

To the west of the station the new Liverpool Street terminus was being constructed, but this was not ready at the time; a new station at Bishopsgate (Low Level) had been constructed and initial services towards London terminated there for a short period. On 2 October 1874, operations commenced through to Liverpool Street; the terminus had a single pair of tracks ready for use, while two others were still being constructed. These were finally completed in May 1875 and the new terminus fully opened to traffic on 1 November 1875, with the old Bishopsgate station closing to passengers on the same day. The line towards Liverpool Street fell at a 1 in 70 gradient west of Bethnal Green, whilst the lines towards Bishopsgate continued on a more or less level gradient.

Bethnal Green had four platforms; two each served the Enfield/Chingford lines and the GEML towards Stratford respectively.

The old Bishopsgate station was converted to a goods depot and some rearrangement of the original facilities took place in an area which became known as Spitalfields Depot. The depot included a wagon hoist that allowed wagons to be transferred to the East London Line, which operated at a lower level. A direct rail link had been planned here in the 1880s, but was never developed.

By the 1880s, it was clear that Liverpool Street required further extension and this included a third set of running lines between Bethnal Green and the terminus. Parliamentary approval was given in 1888, with work starting in 1890. The new lines were opened on 4 April 1891 and, at Bethnal Green, the tracks were rearranged so trains from Enfield and Chingford could use these. The former tracks for the main line trains were now served by suburban trains to and from Stratford, whilst two new lines through the area acted as the through lines for longer-distance trains.

In 1891, an additional two tracks were opened between Globe Road & Devonshire Street and Bethnal Green, where room for a further two tracks was provided. Then, in 1894, an additional pair of tracks were opened between Bethnal Green and Hackney Downs.

During World War 1, the station was considered for closure along with some lesser used stations, including Bishopsgate (Low Level), Globe Road & Devonshire Street and Cambridge Heath. It was, however, reprieved, possibly because it was positioned centrally to the three named stations above, all of which were closed in 1916.

From 1920, Bethnal Green was served by the revamped suburban Jazz service.

=== LNER (1923–1948) ===
After the Railways Act 1921 was passed, the country's railways were grouped into four companies, with effect from 1 January 1923. At Bethnal Green, the London & North Eastern Railway (LNER) took over operations of the GER services.

Little changed during the 1920s but, by the 1930s, thoughts were turning to electrify the GEML and extending the Central Line east from Liverpool Street to Stratford, and then to Ongar and Fairlop. One of the first tasks was the construction of a flyover west of Ilford. The outbreak of the World War 2 brought the project to a temporary halt.

Trains on the GEML between Liverpool Street and Stratford ceased calling at Bethnal Green on 8 December 1946 and two platforms were closed, although the remains of the eastbound platform are still in situ and visible from the main line trains. The London-bound platform was demolished and the tracks rearranged, coinciding with the swapping of services from the former fast tracks onto the former slow tracks, resulting in the arrangement utilised today.

Following the closure of the main line platforms in 1946, only Enfield Town, Chingford and Seven Sisters services would have called at Bethnal Green. It was at this time that the suffix "Junction" was dropped from the station name.

=== British Railways (1948–1994) ===
On nationalisation in 1948, responsibility for operating the station passed to British Railways' Eastern Region.

In 1949, electric services commenced operations between Liverpool Street and Chadwell Heath, later extended to Shenfield and to Chelmsford in 1956. The full opening of the Ilford flyover led to a reorganisation of the lines through Bethnal Green, with these services now operating on what were the main lines.

The lines through Hackney were electrified in the late 1950s with electric services commencing operation on 21 November 1960 to Chingford and Enfield Town.

In 1964, a disastrous fire at the Bishopsgate goods depot resulted in the cessation of traffic and the Spitalfields depot was closed by 1967, following a further decline in goods traffic,

The platform awnings were cut back in 1966. By the early 1980s, the original GER platform buildings were in poor condition and were demolished in 1985/1986, being replaced by spartan brick-built structures.

=== The privatisated era (1994 – present day) ===
After privatisation in April 1994, the services calling at Bethnal Green were operated by a government-owned train operating unit until the franchise was won by private operator Prism Rail in January 1997, which ran services under the West Anglia Great Northern brand. The table below shows how the franchises that served Bethnal Green have changed over time:

Franchises serving Bethnal Green since 1997
Operator	Start date	End date
West Anglia Great Northern	5 January 1997	1 April 2004
National Express East Anglia	1 April 2004	5 February 2012
Abellio Greater Anglia	5 February 2012	31 May 2015
London Overground	31 May 2015	Present

Control of the infrastructure passed to Railtrack in April 1994 (Note: Railtrack was originally government-owned and then privatised in May 1996.) and subsequently to Network Rail in October 2002, following Railtrack's financial collapse.

== Services ==
All services at Bethnal Green are operated as part of the Weaver line of the London Overground. Services are operated using Class 710 Aventra electric multiple units, which began replacing the older Class 315s in March 2020.

The typical off-peak service in trains per hour is:

- 8 tph to London Liverpool Street
- 4 tph to Chingford
- 2 tph to Cheshunt
- 2 tph to Enfield Town.

Preceding station	London Overground	Following station
Liverpool Street Terminus	Weaver line Lea Valley lines	Cambridge Heath towards Cheshunt or Enfield Town
Liverpool Street Terminus	Weaver line Weaver Lea Valley lines	Hackney Downs towards Chingford
Historical railways
Bishopsgate Line open, station closed	Great Eastern Railway Great Eastern Main Line	Globe Road & Devonshire Street Line open, station closed

== Operations ==
=== Signal boxes ===
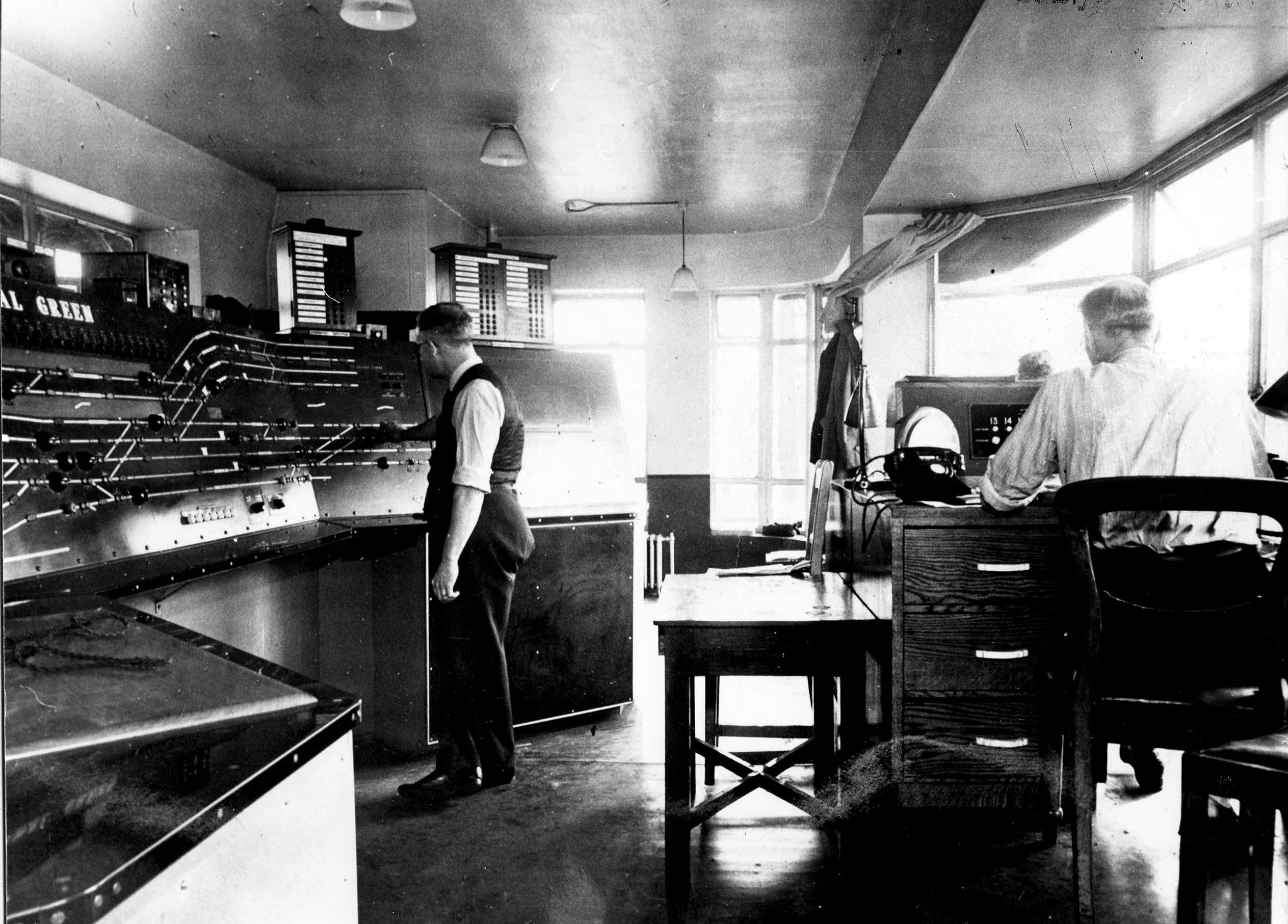
One of the signal boxes (1949)

By 1900, there were four signal boxes operating in the area:

- Middle signal box was located between East London Junction on the gradient up towards Bethnal Green. Bethnal Green West End box controlled the crossover and west end of the station, whilst Bethnal Green East controlled the eastern and northern approaches to the area.
- Granary Junction was the main signal box controlling the approaches to Bishopsgate Goods Yard (as it was by then) and the sidings at Spitalfields. The first Granary Junction box was opened in 1872 and was replaced in 1880 with both structures being located on the south side of the goods lines. This second box lasted until 15 January when a third box was opened, this time on the north side of the line. It had a pioneering electro-pneumatically operated table lever frame, produced by McKenzie & Holland. This was preserved when the box closed on 9 October 1966; it is now at the National Railway Museum in York.
- Bethnal Green West (built 1891) stood at the end of platforms 2 and 3. It was a McKenzie and Holland frame, with 84 working levers.
- Bethnal Green East (built 1891) stood in the area between the Hackney line and the Great Eastern Main line. The box lost its semaphores on 27 November 1935, when the line between Bethnal Green and Hackney Downs was converted to track circuit block and automatic colour light signalling.

The area was resignalled after the war; the West and East signal boxes were closed on 13 April 1947 and 5 February 1949 respectively. They were replaced by a flat-roofed brick-build structure, located in the V between the junction that operated from 6 February 1949 to 25 March 1989, when a further resignalling scheme saw its control transferred to Liverpool Street signalling centre.

=== Timekeepers' office ===
The station had another structure that was similar in appearance to the signal box, but was actually a timekeepers' office. Here, the planned train service was monitored and where trains were running late their performance was communicated to signallers down the line. The statistics would have also been used by the GER, and later the LNER, to understand how the service was running.

The box opened in approximately 1891 and continued in use until after nationalisation. It was located on the up local platform which was demolished after closure in December 1946, although the box had gone before closure. However, two posts were transferred to the new box in 1949 and, in the early years, the function of the timekeepers was to:

- Lean out of the window and get the next working (as advised by the crew shouting the details) of any light engine moves (Note: Locomotive only.) that were proceeding towards Liverpool Street. This was then telephoned through to the main panel.
- Input the Liverpool Street platform details into a train describer, again to assist the operation of the terminus station.

=== Accidents and incidents ===
- On 4 September 1953, a passenger train, hauled by the LNER Thompson Class B1 4-6-0 no. 61046, derailed when a set of points moved underneath it
- On 17 June 1962, a southbound passenger train was derailed due to a track fault; 17 passengers were injured
- On 12 February 1964, a train of empty stock was derailed when a set of points moved underneath it. The location was similar to the 1962 accident site at the east end of the station.

=== Spitalfields engine shed ===
There was a small single-tracked engine shed on the south side of the line as part of the Spitalfields depot. The precise opening date is unknown, but was thought to be late 1860s/early 1870s with its earliest mention being in 1872. It housed shunting locomotives that worked Bishopsgate goods depot and the Spitalfields coal sidings which were in use 24 hours per day.

The locomotives stabled were generally Great Eastern classes allocated to Stratford engine shed, such as GER Class C72 (LNE classification J68), GER Class R24 (LNE classification J67) and GER Class S56 (LNE classification J69). In the late 1950s, traffic declined and a single diesel shunter was considered able to deal with the traffic. As a result, the shed closed in c.1959/60.
