= Bishopsgate (Low Level) railway station =

Disused railway station in London, England

Bishopsgate (Low Level)
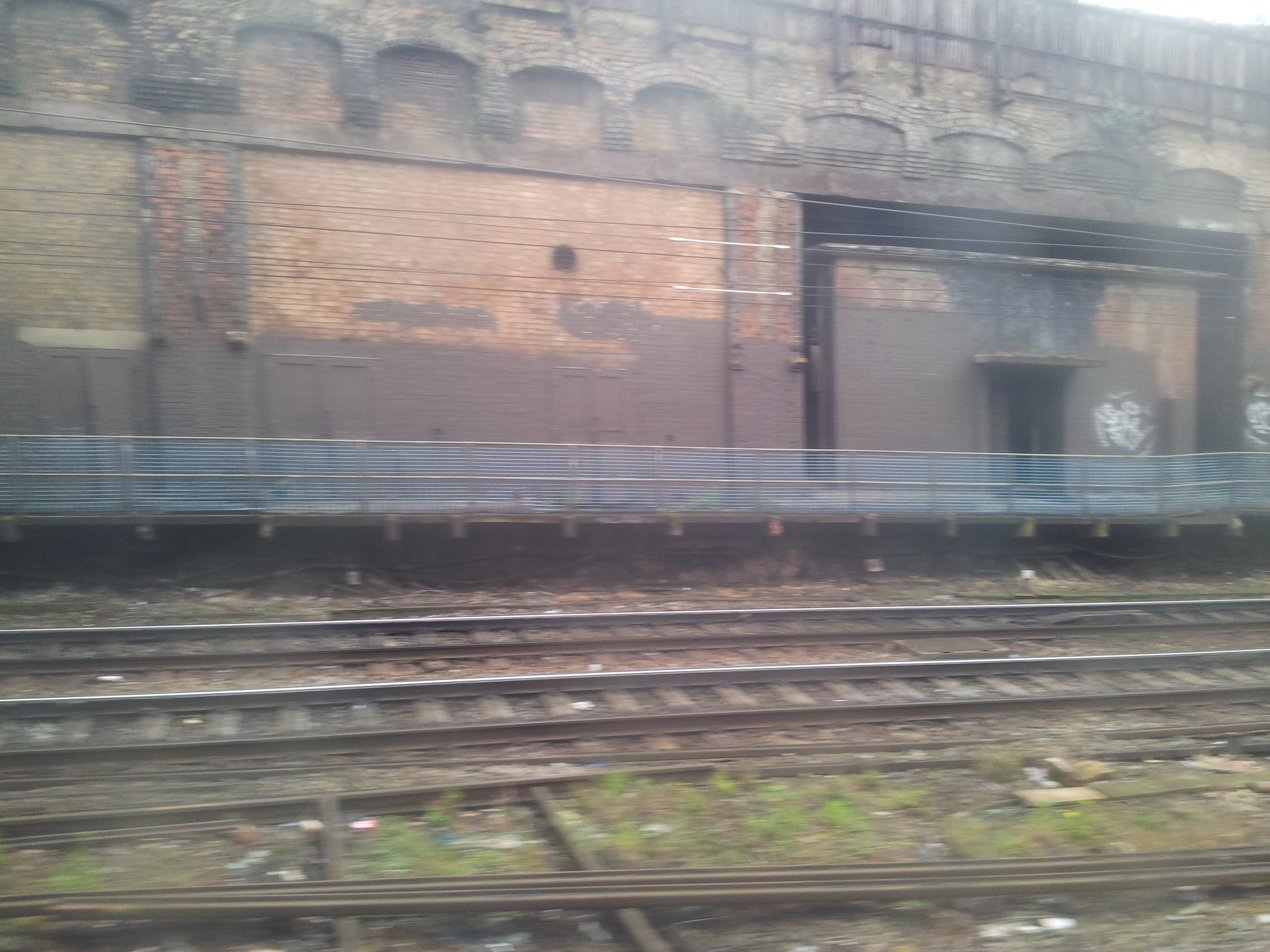
- Interactive map of Bishopsgate (Low Level)

General information
- Location: Shoreditch, near Bishopsgate
- Local authority: London Borough of Tower Hamlets
- Grid reference: TQ335821
- Number of platforms: 6

Railway companies
- Original company: Great Eastern Railway

Key dates
- 4 November 1872: Opened as Bishopsgate (Low Level)
- 1 November 1875: Renamed Bishopsgate
- 22 May 1916: Closed
- Replaced by: None

Other information
- Coordinates: 51.52250°N 0.07472°W

Bishopsgate (Low Level) was a railway station opened by the Great Eastern Railway (GER) on 4 November 1872 alongside the company's first London terminus, Bishopsgate, which stood on a viaduct (and thus became also known as Bishopsgate (High Level)). The newer station was on a lower route, leading south-west, which the GER was building to its future Liverpool Street terminus and was situated on Quaker Street, on the eastern side of Shoreditch High Street (now in the London Borough of Tower Hamlets but then in the Metropolitan Borough of Bethnal Green) near Bishopsgate.

Situated initially in a brick-lined cutting, the station was covered by two curving roofs and the platforms were accessed by stairs down from the ticket office, which stood on a bridge above the London end of the station.

The station was initially opened as a relief station for the high-level terminus when it became unable to cope with the increasing demand. Between November 1872 and January 1874 the station, acting as a temporary terminus, handled traffic off the Enfield and Walthamstow lines. (Note: Walthamstow was the terminus of the Chingford branch at this time.) Early in 1874 the first four platforms at Liverpool Street station opened, and Bishopsgate (Low Level) station became a normal through station.

After the full opening of Liverpool Street in November 1875, the "high level" original Bishopsgate station closed to passengers and the name of Bishopsgate (Low Level) was simplified to Bishopsgate. The high-level terminus reopened as a converted goods station in 1881 known as Bishopsgate goods yard, and had a subway linking it to the passenger station.

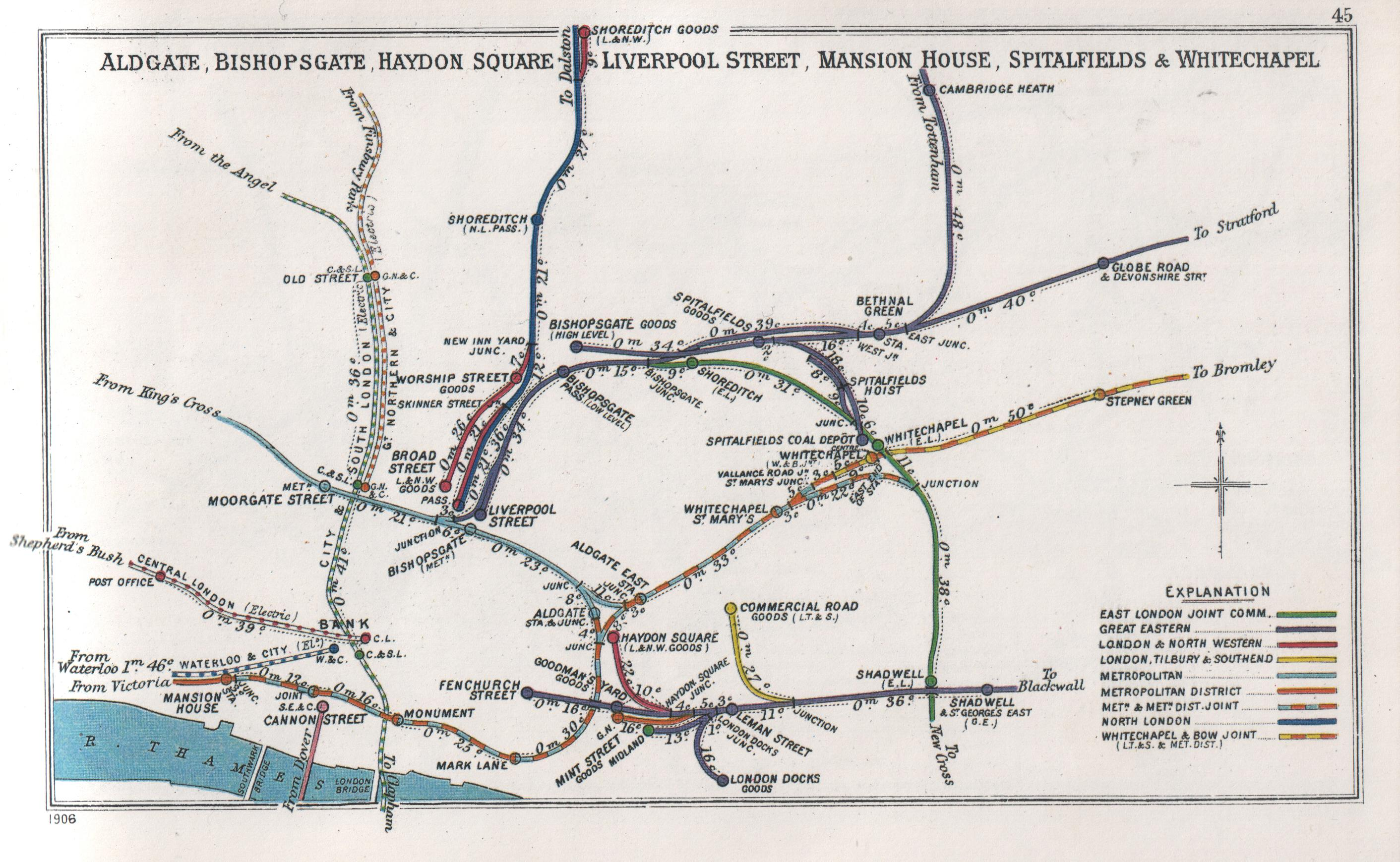
Map of the Bishopsgate and Liverpool Street area, 1906

On 6 August 1889 there was an accident between Bishopsgate and Liverpool Street when a passenger service ran into the back of a stationary empty coaching stock train. An inquiry was unable to determine the exact cause of the crash due to conflicting witness statements.

A further two running lines were added in 1891, and two platform faces subsequently added. A second ticket office was opened in Commercial Street to serve these platforms. These lines were built through the lower levels of the original Bishopsgate station. In November 1893 the station became one of the first on the Great Eastern Railway to be lit by electricity supplied by the company's nearby Norton Folgate power station.

In 1902–3 the overall roofs were demolished and replaced by awnings.

Bishopsgate station was closed on 22 May 1916 with other inner-suburban stations on the GER line through the East End of London. Today little remains of the low-level station except two derelict platforms, visible from trains on the approach into Liverpool Street main line station. The arches on the south platform were decorated in 2012 with panels displaying the flags of nations competing in the London Olympic Games that summer.

In 2010 Shoreditch High Street railway station was opened on the East London line, parallel to, above, and immediately to the north of the old Bishopsgate station.

| Preceding station | Historical railways | Following station |
|---|---|---|
| Liverpool Street | Great Eastern; Railway; Great Eastern Main Line | Bethnal Green |
