= Stansted railway station =

Stansted railway station may refer to:

- Stansted Mountfitchet railway station, the original Stansted station, serving the village of Stansted Mountfitchet in Essex, England
- Stansted Airport railway station, serving Stansted Airport in Essex, England
