= British Rail Class 322 =

British electric multiple unit train

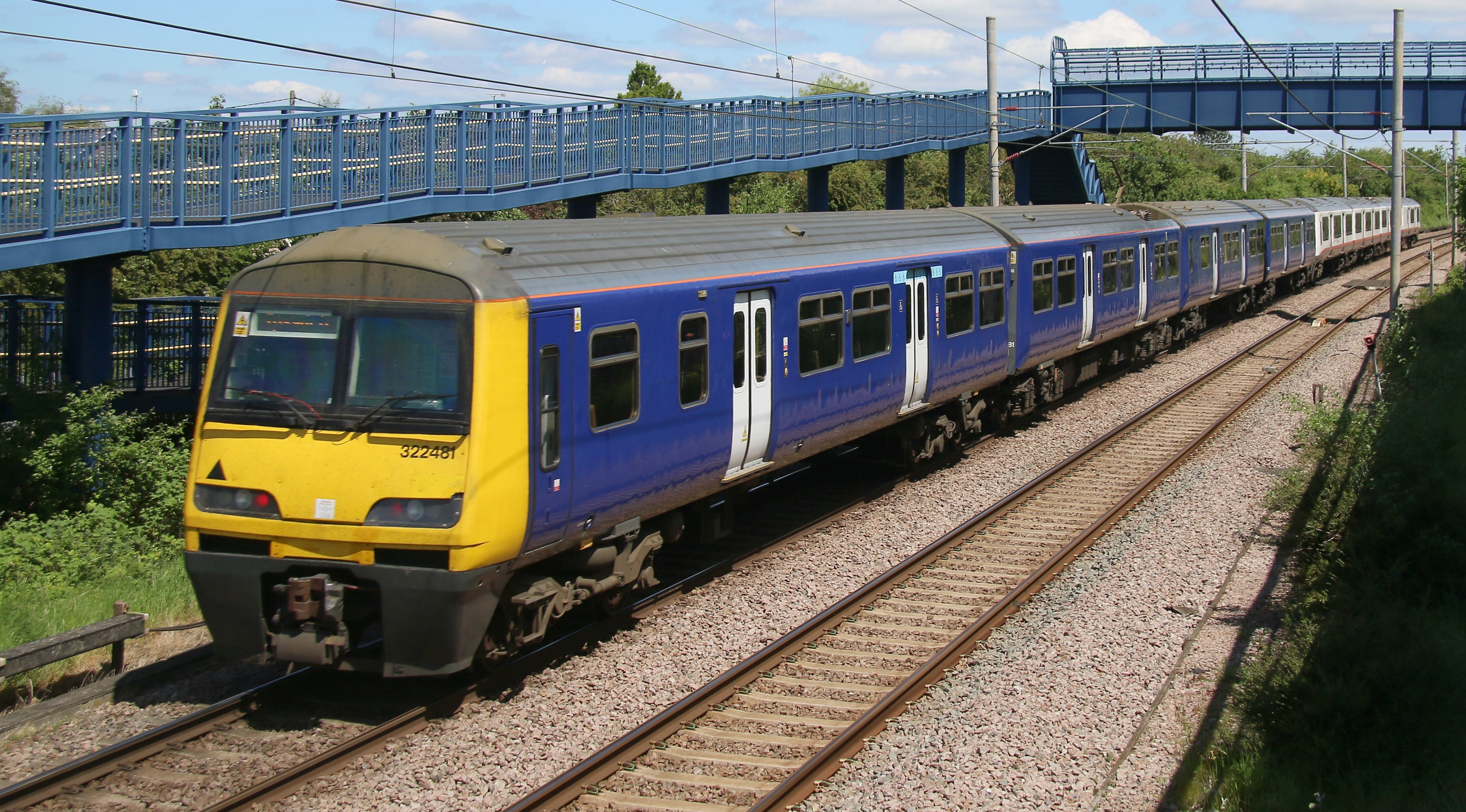
- Class 322 at Wilsons Lane in Marks Tey in 2021

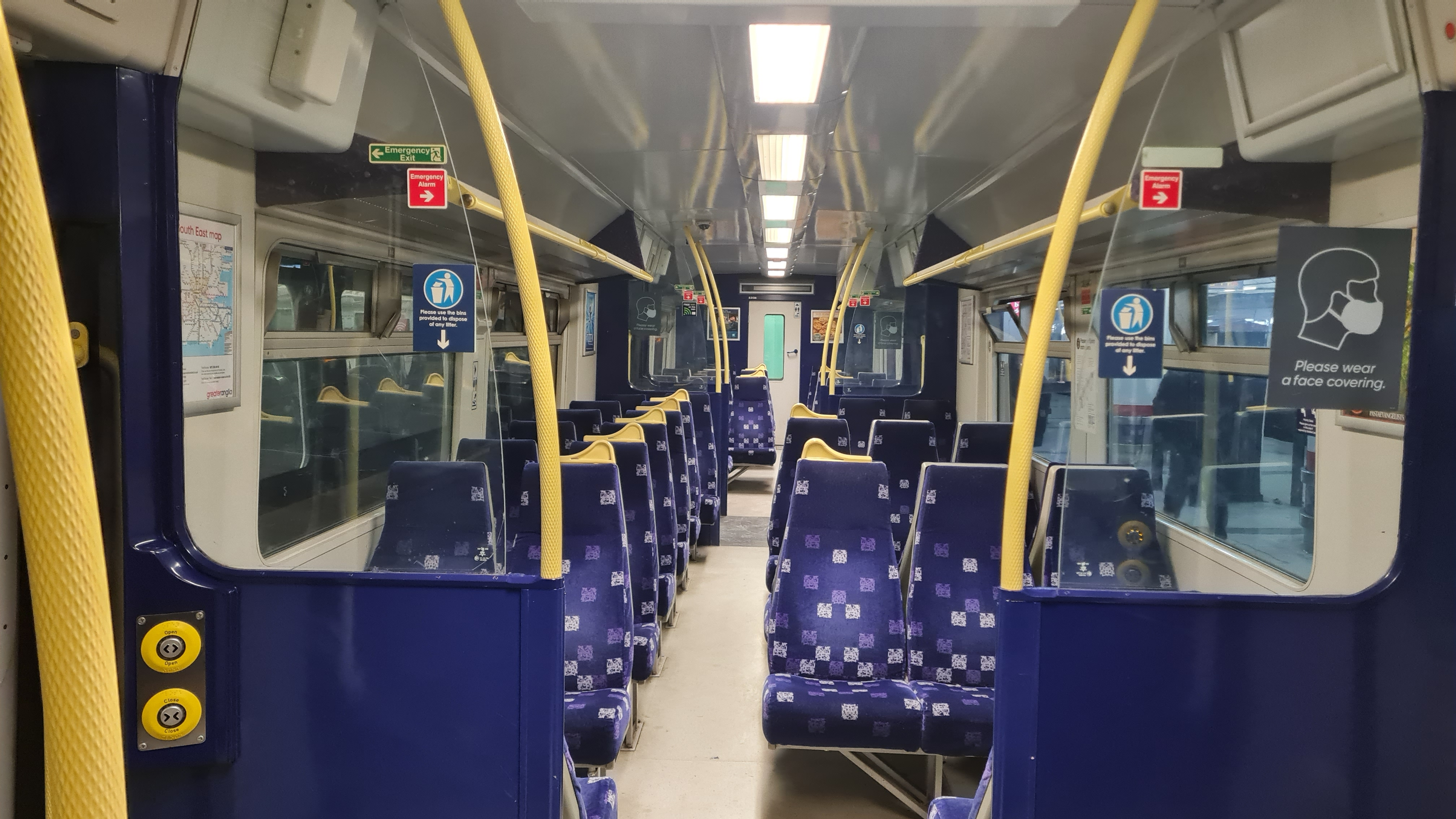
- Refurbished Northern Rail interior
- In service: 1990 – August 2022
- Manufacturer: British Rail Engineering Limited
- Built at: Holgate Road Works, York
- Family name: BR Second Generation (Mark 3)
- Replaced: Class 305
- Constructed: 1990
- Refurbished: 2005–2007 (at Hunslet-Barclay, Kilmarnock)
- Scrapped: 2022
- Number built: 5
- Number in service: 0
- Number preserved: 0
- Number scrapped: 5
- Successor: Class 331 (Northern); Class 720 (Greater Anglia)
- Formation: 4 cars per unit: DTSL-MS-TSL-DTS
- Fleet numbers: 322481–322485
- Capacity: 309 seats
- Owner: Eversholt Rail Group
- Operators: Arriva Rail North; First ScotRail; Greater Anglia; Network SouthEast; North Western Trains; Northern Rail; Northern Trains; One; ScotRail (National Express); Silverlink; West Anglia Great Northern
- Depot: Shields Road (Glasgow)

Specifications
- Car body construction: Steel
- Car length: DT vehs.: 19.950 m (65 ft 5.4 in); Others: 19.920 m (65 ft 4.3 in)
- Width: 2.816 m (9 ft 2.9 in)
- Height: 3.775 m (12 ft 4.6 in)
- Doors: Double-leaf sliding pocket, each 1.200 m (3 ft 11.2 in) wide (2 per side per car)
- Wheelbase: Over bogie centres: 14.170 m (46 ft 5.9 in)
- Maximum speed: 100 mph (161 km/h)
- Weight: Total: 141.8 t (139.6 long tons; 156.3 short tons)
- Traction motors: 4 × Brush TM21-41
- Power output: 996 kW (1,336 hp)
- Acceleration: 0.55 m/s^{2} (1.8 ft/s^{2})
- Electric system: 25 kV 50 Hz AC overhead
- Current collection: Pantograph
- UIC classification: 2′2′+Bo′Bo′+2′2′+2′2′
- Bogies: Powered: BREL P7-4; Unpowered: BREL T3-7
- Minimum turning radius: 71 m (232 ft 11 in)
- Braking systems: Electro-pneumatic (disc) ('Westcode')
- Safety systems: AWS; TPWS
- Coupling system: Tightlock
- Multiple working: With Classes 317–322
- Track gauge: 1,435 mm (4 ft 8 1/2 in) standard gauge

The British Rail Class 322 was a class of electric multiple unit passenger train built by British Rail Engineering Limited in 1990 for the Stansted Express service from London Liverpool Street to Stansted Airport. After becoming surplus to requirements on this route, the fleet saw further use with a number of other operators.

== Description ==
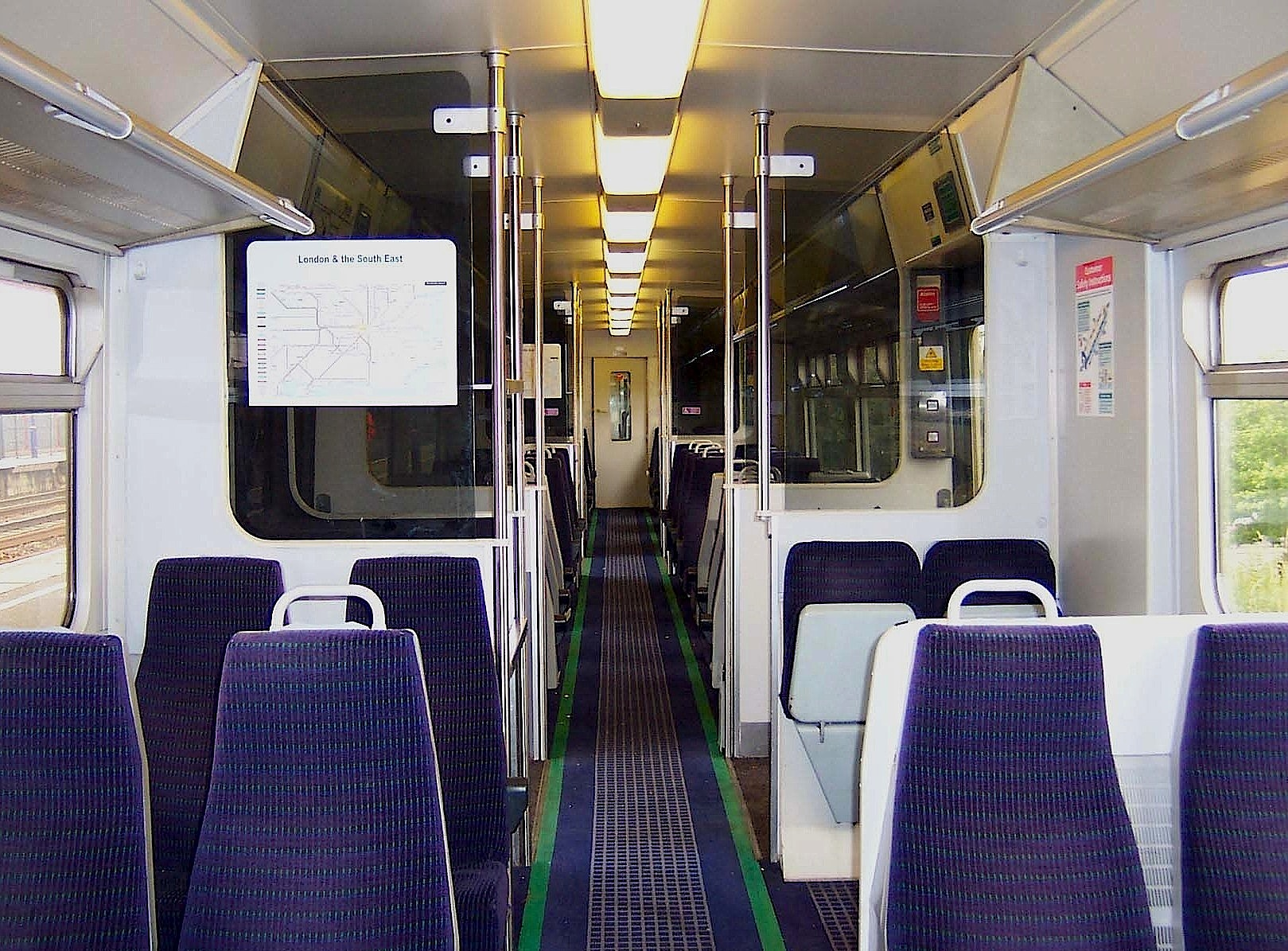
The original interior of a Stansted Express Class 322

In 1987 British Rail (BR) was extending electrification north from London Liverpool Street towards Cambridge. Included in this plan was the construction of new branch line, diverging from the main line at Stansted Mountfitchet, to serve the newly built Stansted Airport station, which opened in 1991. BR decided to build a dedicated fleet of units to work a new service, the Stansted Express.

The Class 322 units were built to the same basic design as the Class 321 units, which were still under construction for services on the Great Eastern Main Line and West Coast Main Line, but with a larger First Class area in the DTCO resulting in a different window arrangement. Although the Stansted route fell under the jurisdiction of Network SouthEast (NSE), the units were delivered into service in a special white livery with a broad green band, instead of the more usual NSE blue/red/white livery.

Five 4-car units were built, numbered 322481–322485. Each unit consisted of two outer driving trailers, an intermediate trailer, and an intermediate motor coach, arranged and numbered as follows:

Number range	Designation as-built	Designation post-2015	Description
78163–78167	DTC	DTSL	Driver's cab, Trailer car, Standard class (open saloon), Lavatory
63137–63141	MS		Motor car, Standard class (open saloon)
72023–72027	TSL		Trailer car, Standard class (open saloon), Lavatory
77985–77989	DTS		Driver's cab, Trailer car, Standard class (open saloon)

Originally the units had a lower density 2+2 seating arrangement in Standard Class appropriate to their use on airport traffic, but during their C6X refurbishment between 2005 and 2007 the units were converted to standard-class only and fitted with high-density 3+2 seating. The DTC and DTS vehicles were redesignated DTS(A) and DTS(B) respectively at this time. Following transfer from First ScotRail to Northern Rail in 2011, the first-class seating was refitted to the DTS(A) vehicles; but it was removed again in 2015 and replaced with a universally-accessible toilet. At this point the DTS(A) and DTS(B) vehicles were respectively redesignated DTSL and DTS.

== Operations ==
=== Network SouthEast ===
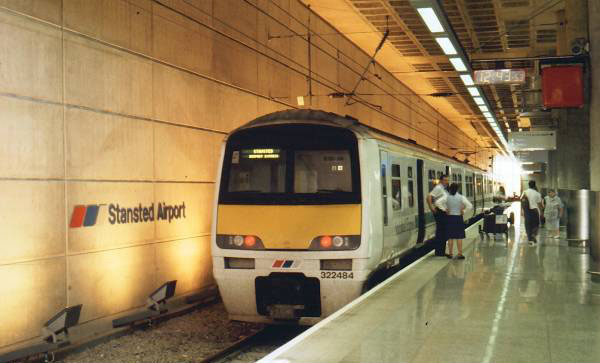
Class 322 in original livery at Stansted Airport

On introduction in 1990 the Class 322s were painted in a joint livery for Network SouthEast (NSE) and British Airports Authority consisting of a light grey and white body with green waist band lettered "Stansted Express" on one side and "Network SouthEast" on the other. Until opening of the Stansted Airport spur the units worked peak-hour services between Cambridge and Liverpool Street, but also found use on special trains wandering as far afield as York and Colchester.

=== West Anglia Great Northern ===
In the lead up to the privatisation of British Rail, in 1994 all were sold to Eversholt Rail Group. All passed with the franchise to West Anglia Great Northern in January 1997. Having been replaced by Class 317s on Stansted services, they were used indiscriminately as part of the general fleet and would operate on other WAGN services including on the East Coast Main Line between London King's Cross and Peterborough.

=== Sub-leasing from WAGN ===
In 1998 two Class 322 units were sub-leased to North Western Trains to operate a service between London Euston and Manchester Airport but the service was discontinued after a year and the units were returned to WAGN. From 1998 units were also occasionally sub-let to Silverlink and used on services between Euston and Birmingham and to Anglia Railways to cover for late delivery of units for London Liverpool Street to Norwich services.

=== ScotRail ===
In December 2001, all were transferred to fellow National Express franchise ScotRail to replace the slam-door Class 305s on the North Berwick Line. To facilitate their movement to Glasgow Shields Road TMD, they also operated limited services to Glasgow Central via the Carstairs line.

=== One ===
On the instructions of the Strategic Rail Authority, all returned to WAGN in March 2004 in preparation for the takeover of the franchise by One. Under One, the Class 322s were used in a common pool with the Class 321s.

=== First ScotRail ===
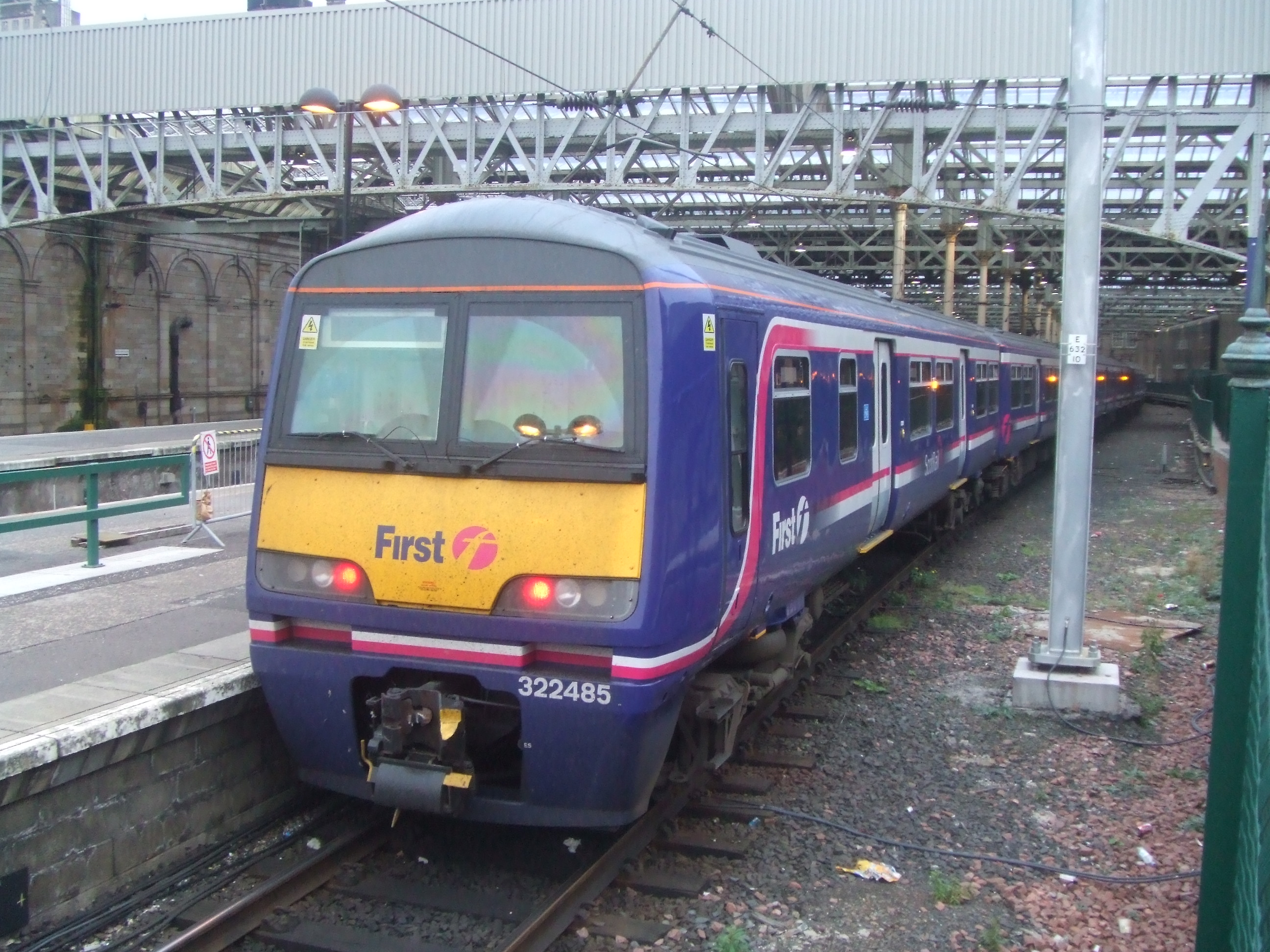
First ScotRail Class 322 at Edinburgh Waverley in 2007

Having been deemed surplus by One, in July 2005 all returned to Scotland to operate with First ScotRail on the North Berwick Line, while also being used on peak services to Glasgow and Carstairs. To provide cover while its Class 321s were overhauled, 322484 was hired to Northern Rail to operate Doncaster to Leeds services. In 2006/07, all were refurbished by Hunslet-Barclay, Kilmarnock with capacity increased from 252 to 293.

=== Northern ===
Having been superseded by Class 380s, all were transferred to Northern Rail in July and August 2011. Based at Neville Hill TMD, they operated services from Leeds to Doncaster, Bradford Forster Square, Skipton and Ilkley. Having passed with the franchise to Arriva Rail North and Northern Trains, all were replaced by Class 331s with the last withdrawn in May 2020.

=== Greater Anglia ===
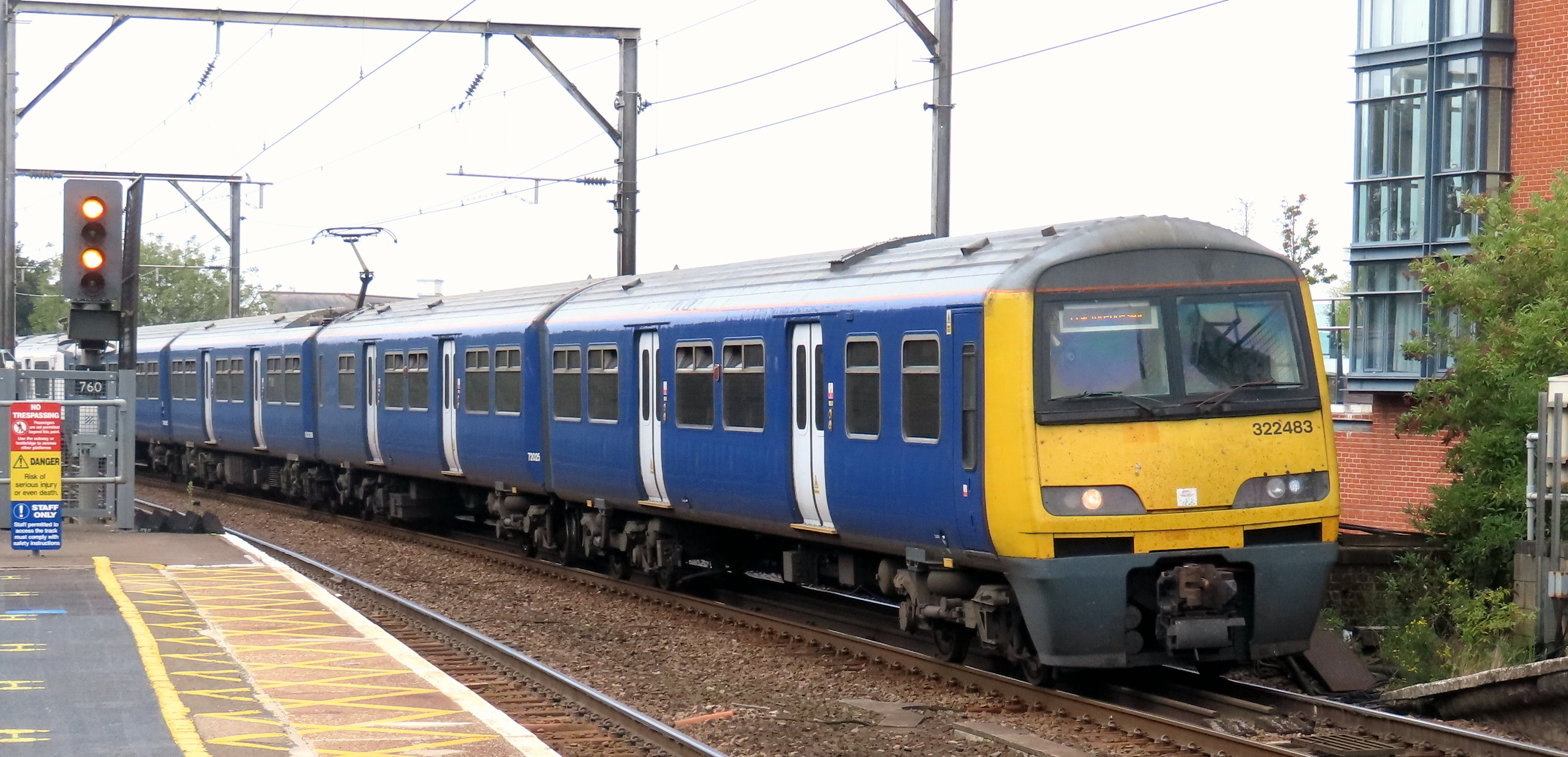
Class 322 approaching Chelmsford

In July 2020 all were leased to Greater Anglia to operate services out of London Liverpool Street on the Great Eastern Main Line. They were leased to allow Class 360s to move to East Midlands Railway.

Greater Anglia withdrew the fleet from service in August 2022, and by the end of September all five units had been scrapped.

== Fleet details ==
Class	Status	Qty.	Year built	Cars per unit	Unit nos.
322	Scrapped	5	1990	4	322481–322485

== Named units ==
Some units received names.

- 322481: North Berwick Flyer 1850-2000
- 322485: North Berwick Flyer 1850-2000
