= Macquarie European Rail =

European rolling stock company

- Predecessor: Macquarie Group
- Founded: January 2009
- Founder: Lloyds Banking Group
- Headquarters: London, England
- Area served: Europe; United Kingdom
- Products: Rolling stock leasing
- Parent: Akiem
- Website: www.macquarie.com

Macquarie European Rail (formerly Lloyds TSB General Leasing) is a rolling stock company (ROSCO). It is presently owned by the French railway leasing entity Akiem.

Founded as Lloyds TSB General Leasing as a subsidiary of Lloyds Banking Group in January 2009, early financing arrangements involved the Class 379 electric multiple units (EMUs) and Class 70 heavy freight locomotives. The venture also expanded into the continent European rail leasing market. In November 2012, Lloyds opted to sell its rail leasing arm to the financial services specialist Macquarie Group. During February 2020, it was announced that Macquarie European Rail was to be sold to another leading organisation, Akiem, the deal was completed two months later.

== History ==
Macquarie European Rail was established as Lloyds TSB General Leasing in January 2009 by the Lloyds Banking Group to operate in Britain's rolling stock leasing market. Prior to deciding to form its own subsidiary focused on the sector, Lloyds had effectively involved itself already through its participation in the consortium that acquired the rolling stock company (ROSCO) Porterbrook during October 2008.

During May 2009, the company's first major train order was announced, involving the purchase of 30 four-car Class 379 electric multiple units (EMUs) which would go on to be operated by National Express East Anglia on both its Stansted Express and West Anglia routes. Another early venture undertaken by Lloyds TSB was the financing of 20 American-built Class 70 heavy freight locomotives which it leased to Freightliner.

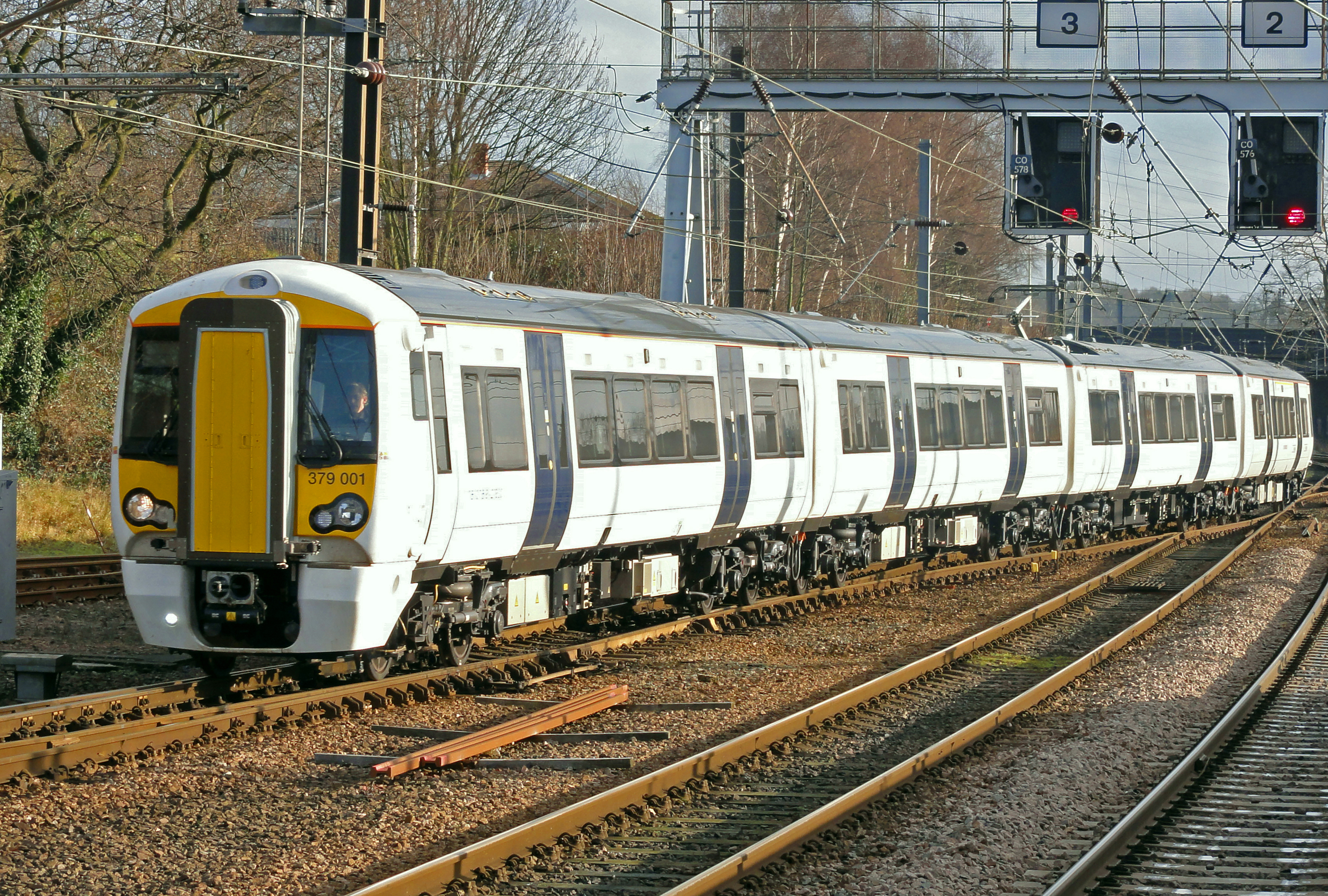
A National Express East Anglia Class 379, leased from Lloyds TSB General Leasing, January 2011

In November 2012, Lloyds Banking Group completed the sale of its rail leasing subsidiary to the multinational financial services entity Macquarie Group; it was promptly rebranded as Macquarie European Rail thereafter. At the time of the sale, the company's activities had expanded to not only cover leases of freight and passenger rolling stock within the United Kingdom, but also a continental European portfolio of locomotives, passenger trains and wagons as well.

In December 2016, an article in the Financial Times gave warning of signs of overheating within the highly competitive ROSCO sector, pointing to Macquarie's relatively youthful Class 379 EMUs as an example of rolling stock that may have trouble finding future work on Britain's railways as yet newer types are rapidly introduced. Citing the high leasing costs associated with the fleet, Abellio Greater Anglia withdrew all of its Class 379 fleet from service in February 2022, after which the units were placed into storage.

In January 2019, rail leasing company Ermewa acquired Macquarie European Rail's 600-strong intermodal wagon fleet, comprising a mix of 60, 80 and 90 foot container wagons.

During February 2020, the sale of Macquarie European Rail to the French rail leasing specialist Akiem was announced. Finalised two months later, at the time of the transaction, Macquarie European Rail's portfolio included 137 locomotives of various types, including Class 66s, Class 70s, Bombardier Traxx, Alstom Primas and GE Transportation 311Ds, which were reportedly in service with 21 different operators. Furthermore, it also comprised multiple units, such as the 30 Bombardier Class 379 EMUs then on lease to Abellio Greater Anglia, 16 Stadler GTW DMUs in the Netherlands, and 110 assorted wagons.
