= Duxford Chapel =

14th-century hospital chapel

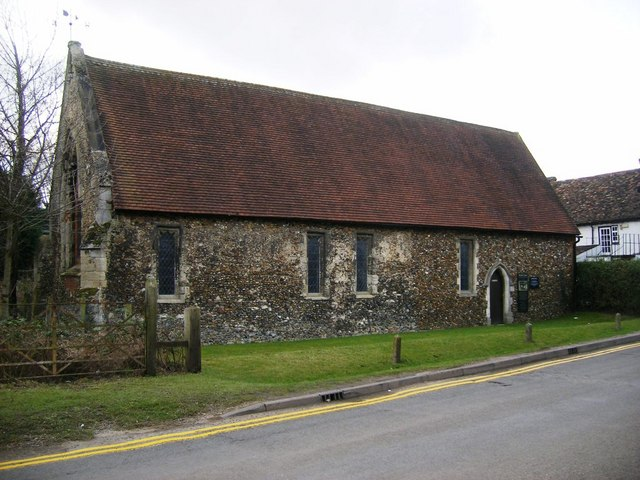

- Location within Cambridgeshire
- 52°06′14″N 0°10′00″E
- Type: Chapel
- Location: Whittlesford
- OS grid reference: TL 48501 47275

History
- Built: 14th century

Site notes
- Area: Cambridgeshire
- Owner: English Heritage

Scheduled monument
- Official name: Chapel of the Hospital of St John at Whittlesford Bridge
- Designated: 26 October 1934
- Reference no.: 1011721

Listed Building – Grade II*
- Official name: Chapel of Hospital of St John the Baptist
- Designated: 22 November 1967
- Reference no.: 1128091

Duxford Chapel is a chapel that was once part of the Hospital of St. John, founded by William de Colville (d.1230) at Duxford, in Cambridgeshire, England. Though called Duxford Chapel, the building is situated between the villages of Duxford and Whittlesford, adjacent to Whittlesford Parkway railway station.

Built in the 14th century, only the chapel survives today. It is a Grade II* listed building and scheduled ancient monument.

The Chapel of the Hospital of St John the Baptist is a small rectangular chapel which mostly dates to around 1337 and was built using flint rubble for the walls and limestone for the doorways and windows. Some sections of the building, including a small part of the southern wall, are considered to date from its 13th century predecessor, which formed part of a hospital.

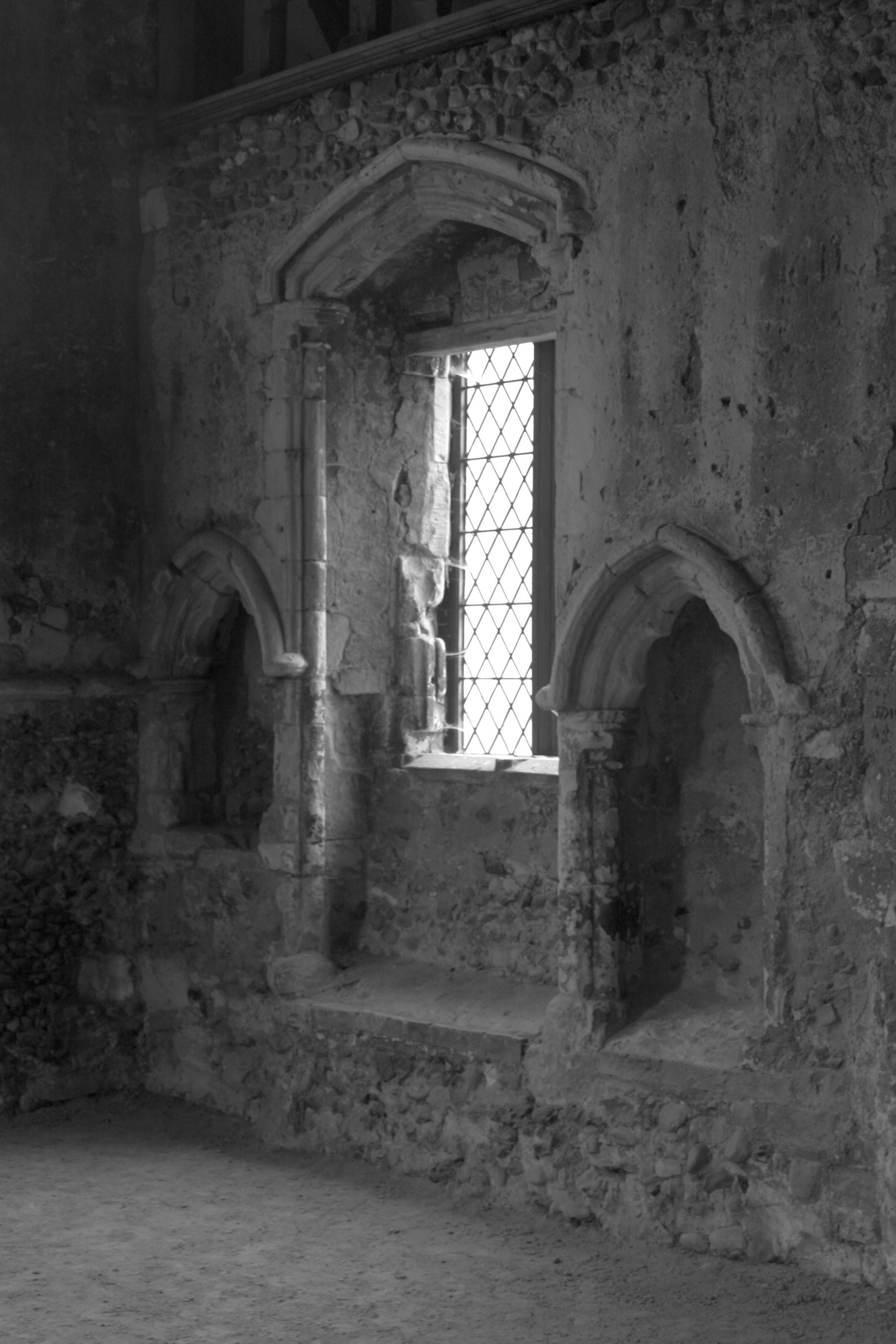
The piscina (left) and sedilla flanking the easternmost window in the south wall of Duxford Chapel

The chapel is a single storey building. The main entrance is near the western end of the north wall. There are two similar doors in the south wall, one directly opposite the main entrance, the other (a priest's door) located towards the eastern end. The north wall is pierced by four windows, dated to circa 1330–1360, each containing a single light with tracery of trefoil design. The four windows on the southern side are of similar date and design, although each formerly contained two lights divided by a central mullion.

Of these windows in the southern wall, the one nearest the altar (East) is flanked by a piscina and a sedilia. Facing the sedilia on the North side is a niche which is thought to be the location of the Easter Sepulchre. A plain aumbry sits in the East wall.

In 1548 the chapel was suppressed during the dissolution of chantries in the reign of Edward VI and sometime after 1554 the chapel was used as a barn by the proprietors of the 16th century Red Lion Inn next door.

The chapel was acquired and restored by the Ministry of Works between 1947 and 1954 and is now under the guardianship of English Heritage.
