= Whittlesford Parkway railway station =

Railway station in Cambridgeshire, England

Coordinates: 52.104°N 0.166°E

Whittlesford Parkway
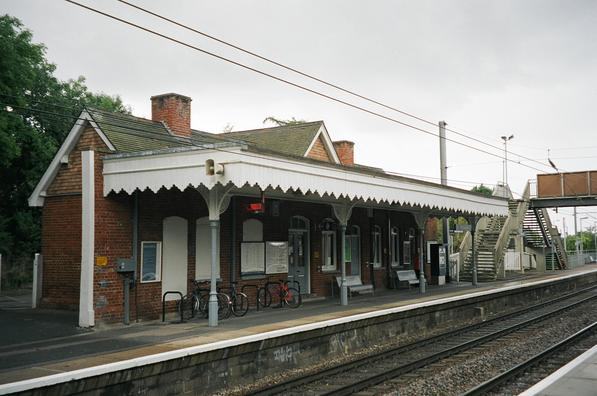
- The station building in 2004

General information
- Location: Whittlesford, District of South Cambridgeshire; England
- Grid reference: TL484472
- Managed by: Greater Anglia
- Platforms: 2

Other information
- Station code: WLF
- Classification: DfT category E

Key dates
- 30 July 1845: Opened as Whittlesford
- 1877-1890: Rebuilt
- May 2007: Renamed Whittlesford Parkway

Passengers
- 2020/21: ▼93,042
- 2021/22: ▲0.292 million
- 2022/23: ▲0.376 million
- 2023/24: ▲0.424 million
- 2024/25: ▲0.454 million
Location
Notes
- Passenger statistics from the Office of Rail and Road

Whittlesford Parkway railway station is on the West Anglia Main Line serving the village of Whittlesford in Cambridgeshire, England. It is 49 miles 1 chain (78.9 km) down the line from London Liverpool Street and is situated between Great Chesterford and Shelford stations. Its three-letter station code is WLF.

The station and all trains calling are operated by Greater Anglia.

It is also near to the villages of Sawston and Duxford and the Imperial War Museum Duxford. The 13th century Duxford Chapel is on the road just east of the station.

The station opened on 30 July 1845 and was rebuilt between 1877 and 1890.

In May 2007, it was renamed from Whittlesford to Whittlesford Parkway.

== Services ==
All services at Whittlesford Parkway are operated by Greater Anglia using Class 720 EMUs and Class 755 bi-mode trains.

The typical off-peak service in trains per hour is:

- 2 tph to London Liverpool Street (1 semi-fast, 1 stopping)
- 1 tph to Stansted Airport
- 2 tph to Cambridge North
- 1 tph to Norwich via Thetford

During the peak hours, the station is served by an additional 2tph to/from London Liverpool Street and Cambridge North/Ely.

Preceding station	National Rail	Following station
Great Chesterford or Audley End	Greater Anglia West Anglia Main Line	Shelford or Cambridge
