= Papworth Wood =

Protected area in Cambridgeshire, England

Coordinates: 52.249°N 0.11°W

- Site of Special Scientific Interest
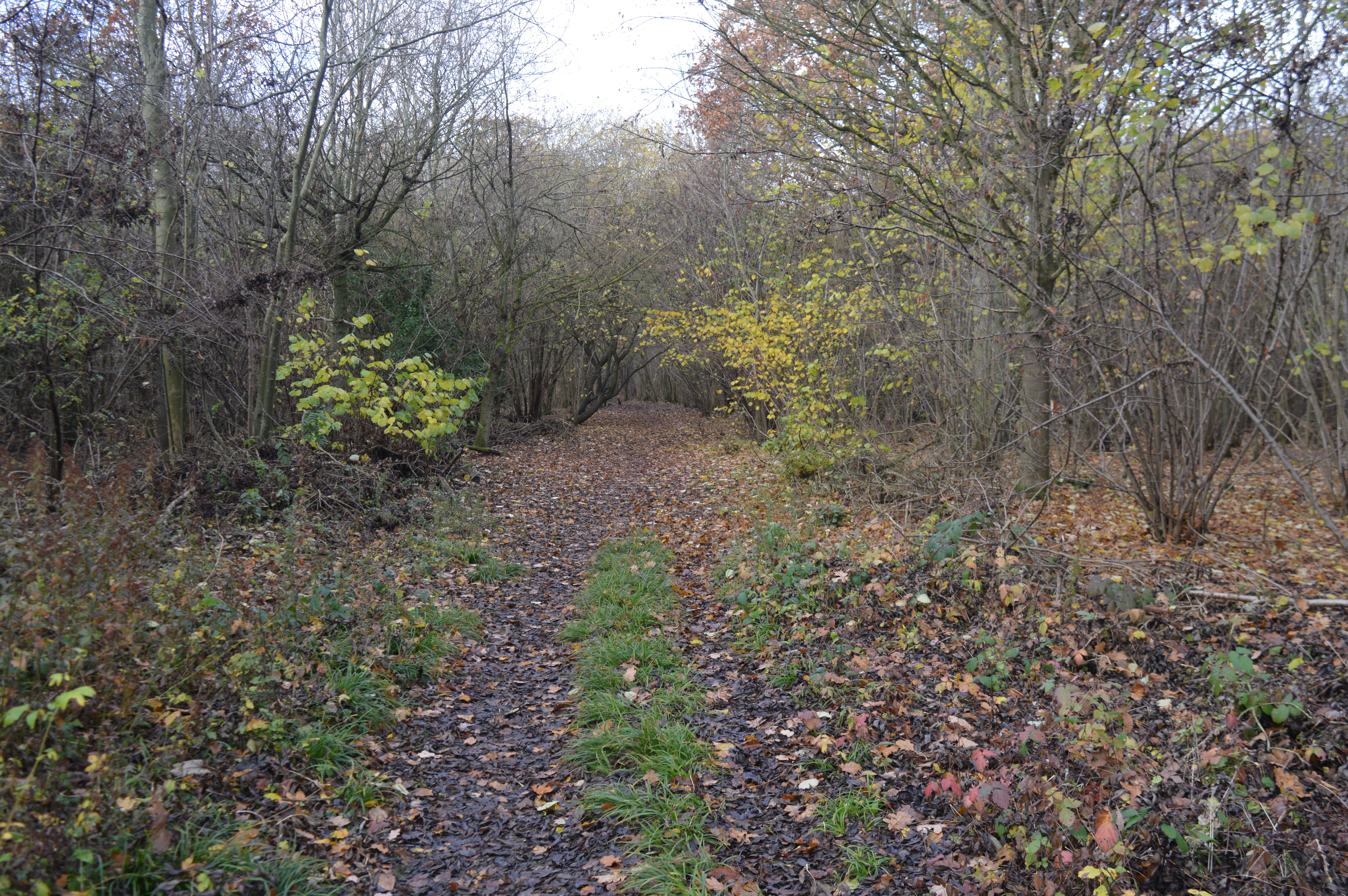
- Location of Papworth Wood.
- Area of search: Cambridgeshire
- Grid reference: TL 291 629
- Interest: Biological
- Area: 8.7 hectares
- Notification date: 1984
- Location map: Magic Map

Papworth Wood is an 8.7-hectare (21-acre) biological Site of Special Scientific Interest in Papworth Everard in Cambridgeshire.

This is one of the oldest secondary woods in the county. It has diverse ground flora including brambles, rough meadow grass, stinging nettles, ground ivy, bluebells and primroses.

There is access to the wood from the grounds of Papworth Hospital.

== Land ownership ==
All land within Papworth Wood SSSI is owned by the local authority.
