= British Rail Class 379 =

Class of British electric multiple unit

British Rail Class 379 Electrostar
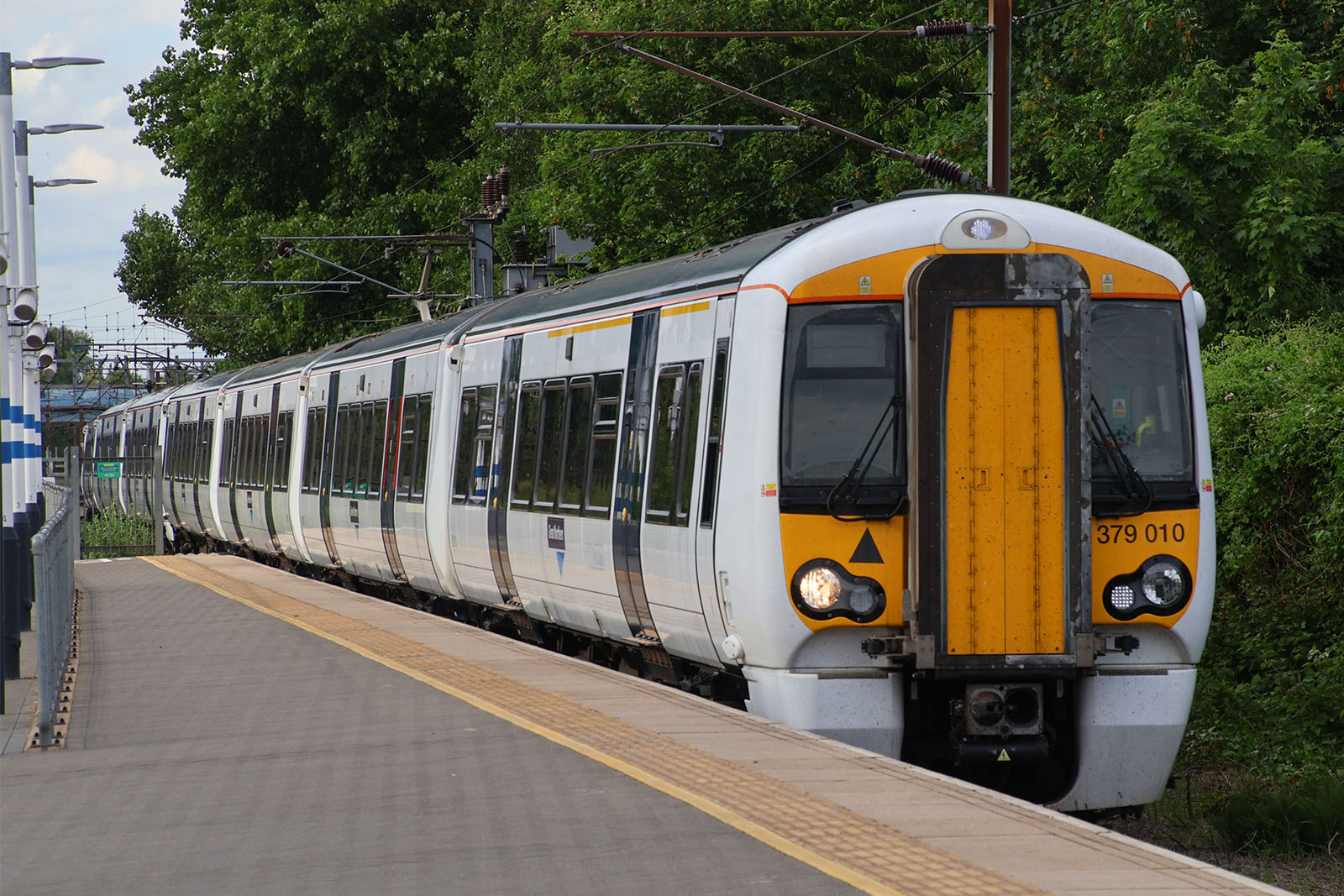
- Great Northern Class 379 at Finsbury Park in 2025

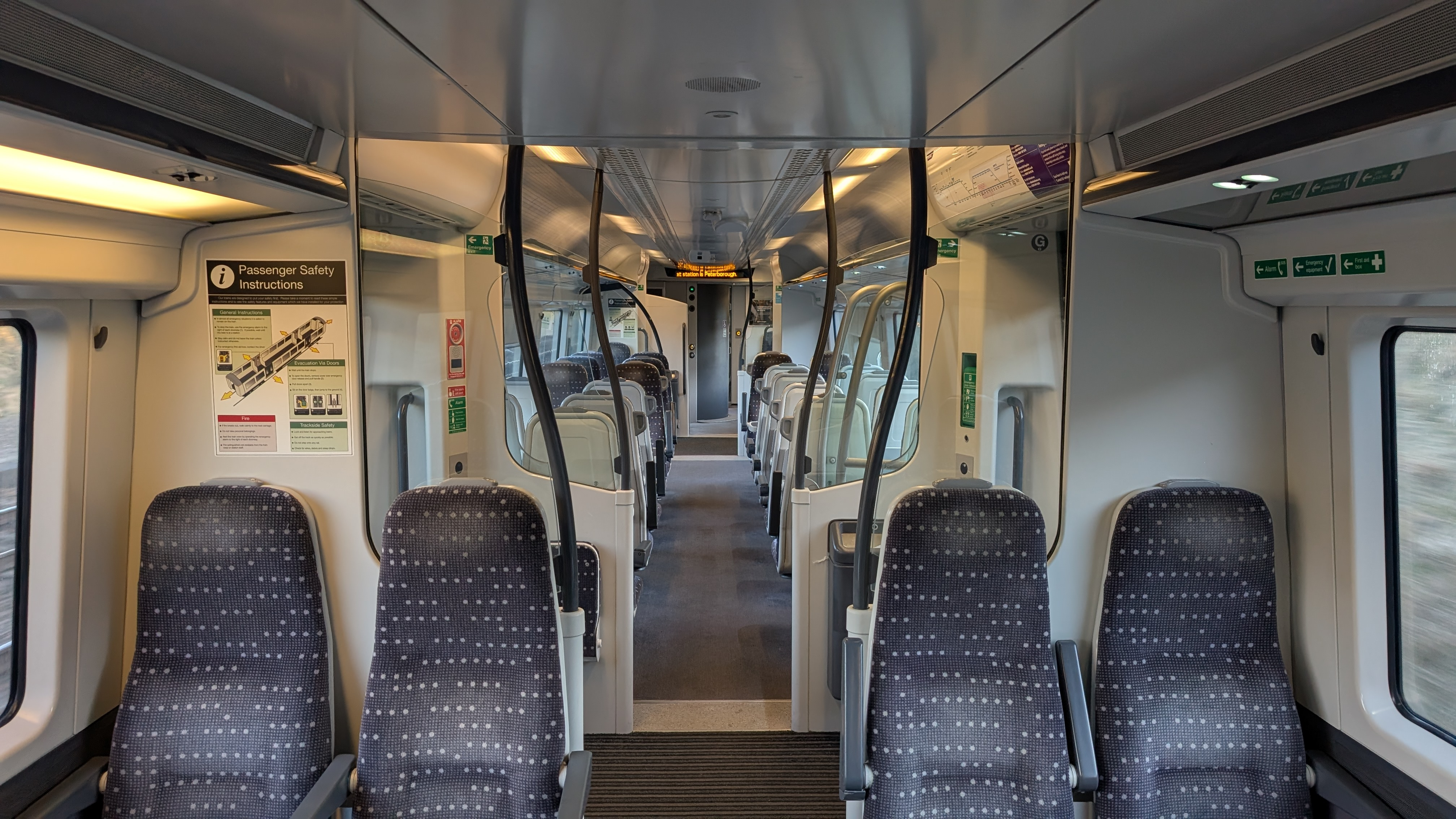
- The interior of Standard Class aboard a Class 379
- In service: Great Northern: 10 February 2025 – Present; Other operators: March 2011 – February 2022
- Manufacturer: Bombardier Transportation
- Built at: Derby Litchurch Lane Works
- Family name: Electrostar
- Replaced: Class 317; Class 387
- Constructed: 2010–2011
- Number built: 30
- Number in service: 20
- Successor: Class 720; Class 745
- Formation: 4 cars per unit: DMSO-MSO-PTSO-DMCO
- Fleet numbers: 379001–379030
- Capacity: 209 seats; (20 first-class, 189 standard)
- Owners: Current: Porterbrook; Former: Rail Logistics Europe (Akiem); Macquarie European Rail
- Operators: Current: Great Northern; Former: Greater Anglia; National Express East Anglia
- Depots: Current: Hornsey; Former: Ilford
- Lines served: Current: Great Northern route; Former: Fen Line; Stansted Express; West Anglia Main Line

Specifications
- Car body construction: Aluminium alloy, with steel cab ends
- Maximum speed: 100 mph (161 km/h)
- Traction system: IGBT–VVVF (Bombardier MITRAC DR1000)
- Power output: 1.68 MW (2,250 hp)
- Acceleration: 0.65 m/s^{2} (2.1 ft/s^{2})
- Electric system: 25 kV 50 Hz AC overhead
- Current collection: Pantograph
- UIC classification: 2′Bo′+2′Bo′+2′2′+Bo′2′
- Bogies: Powered: Bombardier P3-25; Unpowered: Bombardier T3-25
- Braking systems: Air (disc) and regenerative
- Safety systems: AWS; TPWS
- Coupling system: Dellner 12
- Multiple working: Within class, and with Classes 375, 376, 377, and 378
- Track gauge: 1,435 mm (4 ft 8 1/2 in) standard gauge

The British Rail Class 379 Electrostar is an electric multiple unit (EMU) passenger train which was designed and built by Bombardier Transportation. The trains are part of the company's extensive Electrostar family.

In 2007, new trains were proposed to increase capacity on the West Anglia Main Line (WAML), as well as enable the withdrawal of ageing units such as the Class 317 EMUs. 30 4-car Electrostar EMUs were ordered from Bombardier Transportation at a cost of £155 million in 2009, entering service in 2011 as Class 379. They became the principal type operated on the Stansted Express service; as well as running services between London Liverpool Street and Stansted Airport, Cambridge and Kings Lynn. The fleet was initially operated by National Express East Anglia (NXEA) and subsequently by Greater Anglia.

In early 2022, the fleet was withdrawn from service by Greater Anglia owing to high leasing costs, entering long-term storage. In 2025, they returned to service on the Great Northern route.

== Background ==
Around the start of the twenty-first century, the West Anglia Main Line (WAML) was relatively neglected in terms of investment and attention amongst railway planners in comparison to routes such as the Great Eastern Main Line (GEML) and the lines serving Tilbury and Southend. According to industry periodical RAIL, these lines had received considerably more infrastructure investment as well as new rolling stock that had enabled both non-stop services and a higher top speed of 100 mph (161 km/h), the WAML was largely worked by a two decade-old fleet of Class 317 electric multiple units (EMU) on infrastructure that restricted speeds to 80 mph (129 km/h) and only provided sufficient capacity for stopping services. However, measures to improve the line were unveiled in a government white paper released during 2007; specifically, operator National Express was to receive £185 million of investment in exchange for the introduction of various changes on the WAML, including improved facilities and new timetables; while cascaded trains for other lines would be brought in to bolster service levels in the short term, there was also a long-term ambition to procure a newly built fleet of trains to service the line.

Accordingly, an order valued at £155 million was placed in 2009 with rolling stock manufacturer Bombardier Transportation for 30 EMUs, these were subsequently designated as the Class 379. The trains had been ordered as a part of the wider NXEA Service Improvement Plan, which was enacted to expand capacity on the heavily crowded lines into London Liverpool Street. They would supplement, rather than replace, the majority of the line's existing rolling stock, and thus represented a significant increase in capacity on the WAML. A key service that the type was procured for was the Stansted Express, from which National Express East Anglia was reportedly deriving roughly 20 percent of its revenue from operating.

The trains were manufactured at Bombardier Transportation Derby Litchurch Lane Works; the first unit was formally unveiled on 13 October 2010. Testing of this initial unit commenced shortly thereafter, after which it was returned to Derby to receive its final fittings. Deliveries of the fleet were at a consistent pace through to the final Class 379 being handed over during August 2011.

== Design and features ==
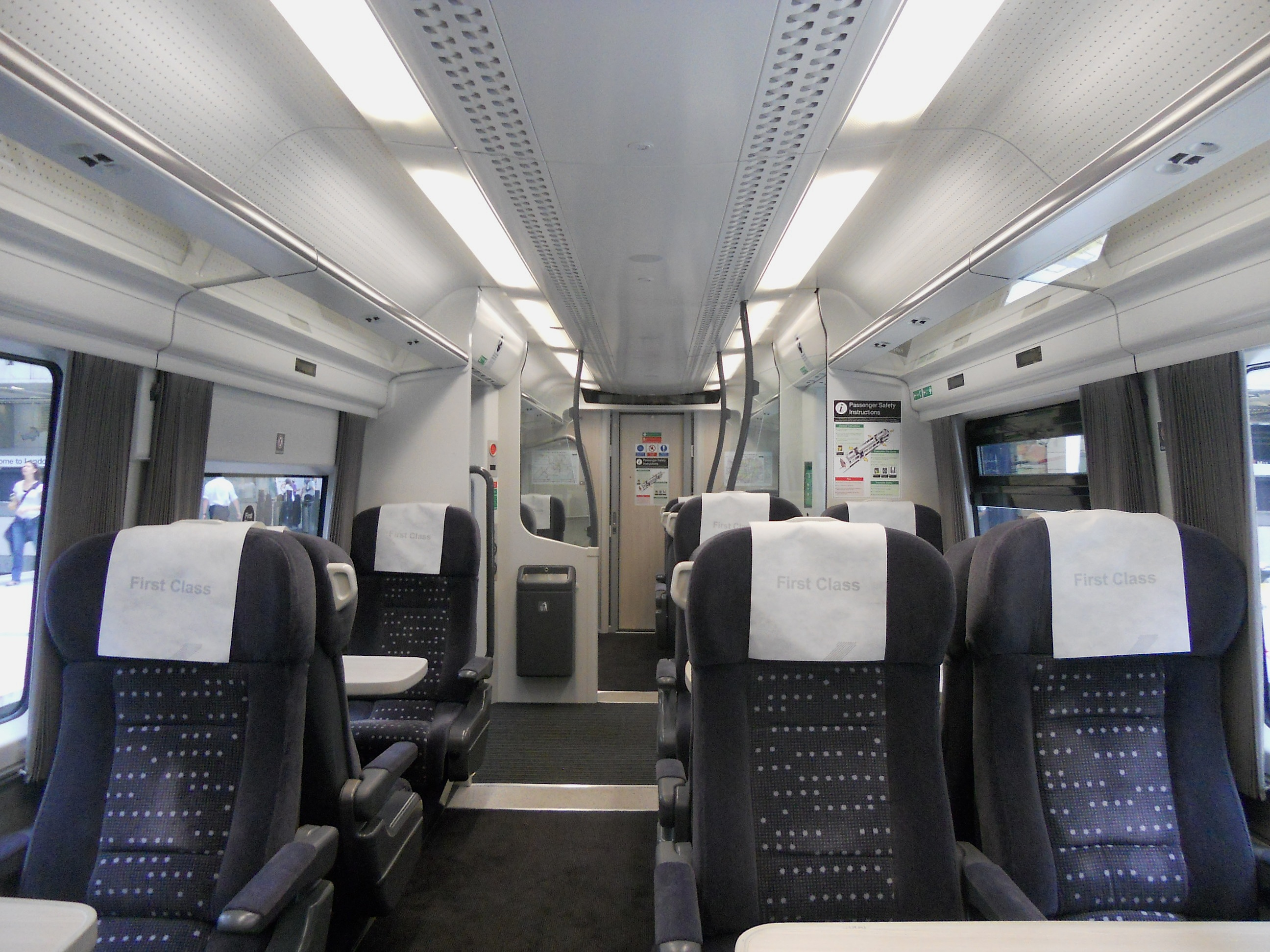
The First Class interior aboard a Class 379.

The Class 379 electric multiple-unit train is a member of Bombardier Transportation's Electrostar family, although a number of its features are derived from the successor Aventra family. Unlike the Class 317 units that the Class 379 replaced, it is equipped with regenerative braking to reduce energy consumption. To increase serviceability and support the maintenance process, the Class 379 has been fitted with Bombardier's Orbita predictive fault monitoring system. Other tweaks to improve service rates include CCTV cameras on the roof to monitor the condition of the pantograph. The type has been described as possessing relatively favourable ride quality, remaining smooth despite its high rate of acceleration.

The Class 379 features a 2+2 seating arrangement for standard class, while 2+1 seating is installed in first class, providing 189 standard-class seats and 20 first-class seats across a typical consist. The standard-class seats are mostly airline-style, with a few table seats. Each airline seat features a flip-down table, a coat hook, and a single electrical socket. There are two toilets per four-coach unit, one of them enlarged to accommodate baby-changing facilities and use by the disabled. To assist airport-bound passengers, relatively large luggage racks are installed at several locations, in addition to the smaller overhead luggage racks. A considerable number of bins are provided, to reduce littering and aid the cleanup process.

Among the various passenger amenities, all carriages are fitted with Wi-Fi, the apparatus for which was supplied by the Swedish company Icomera. This connectivity is used for multiple purposes beyond personal internet by passengers: various onboard systems, including the reservation, CCTV, passenger information displays, and miscellaneous sensors and monitoring systems, are interconnected via the Wi-Fi. Condition-related data is seamlessly fed back to the operator's control centre, aiding operations and maintenance. A digital announcement system is provided, which sounds only during the departure of, or upon the approach to, a served station. The interior lighting was supplied by Teknoware, including emergency lighting that fulfils GM/RT 2130 requirements. Air conditioning is also fitted.

== Operations ==
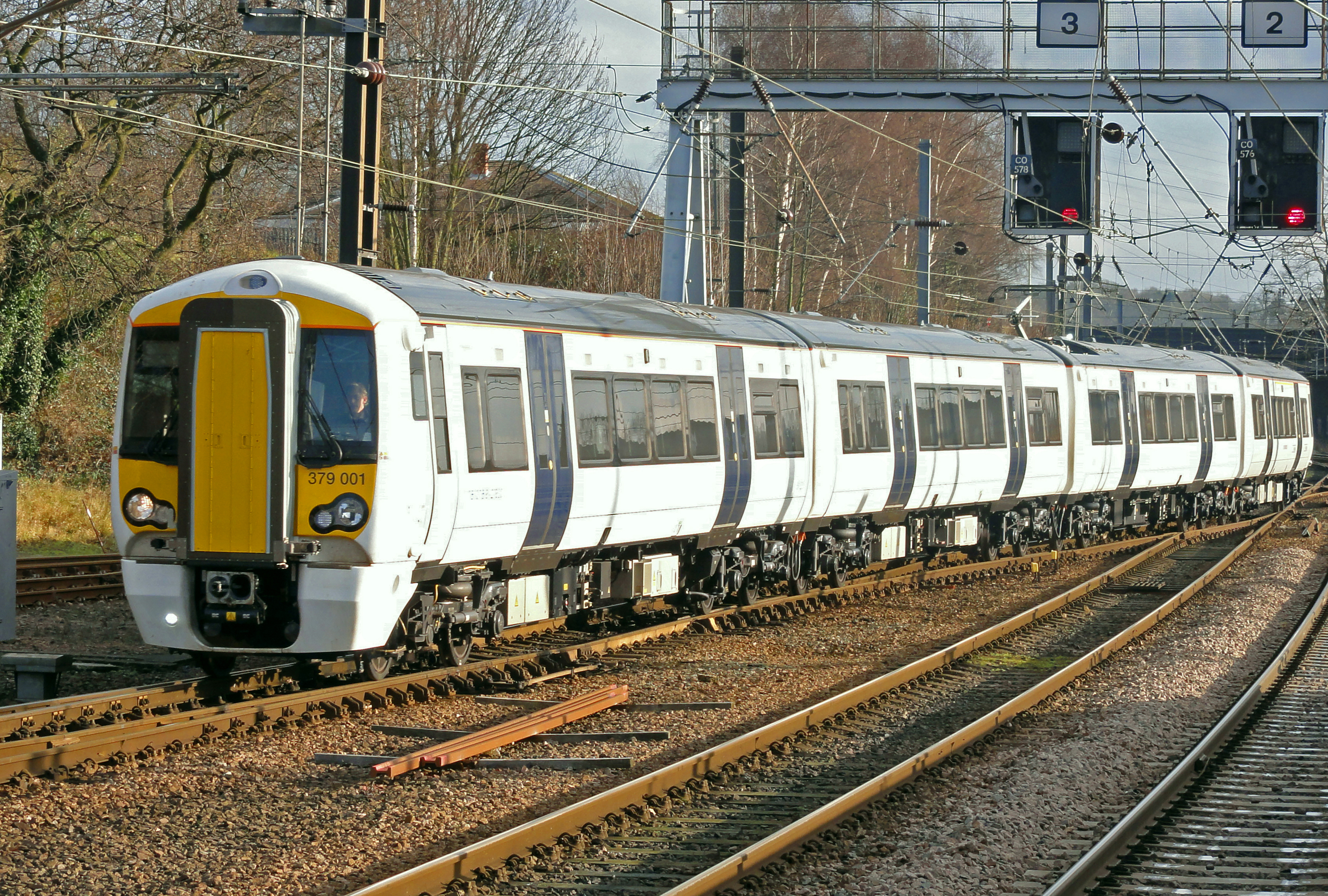
A Class 379 arrives at Norwich during testing in 2011

During early 2011, the Class 379 began its phased introduction into revenue service. On 17 March 2011, the first two units, 379005 and 379006, performed the type's first service with a high-profile launch by Secretary of State for Transport Philip Hammond. 379005 was named Stansted Express in a ceremony at London Liverpool Street. Over the following three months, a further 18 sets joined the initial pair working the Stansted Express services. They have been worked in a mixture of 12-car and 8-car lengths. The type's introduction was relatively trouble-free, with only minor issues such as moving the onboard catering trollies without damaging the interior being quickly resolved.

During summer 2011, the remaining ten Class 379s began entering service on the Cambridge route. By mid-August 2011, all the units had entered service; this was achieved two months ahead of schedule and enabled the airport services to be entirely worked by eight-car Class 379s, while the older Class 317s were cascaded to other routes. The December 2011 timetable change included the introduction of 12-car trains on some peak workings out of Liverpool Street to/from Bishops Stortford, Harlow Town, Ely, Kings Lynn and Cambridge, and on some services out of Stratford to/from Cambridge, Harlow Town and Bishops Stortford and some Bishops Stortford/Stansted Airport-Cambridge services. They worked on long-distance express services. The fleet was maintained by Bombardier at Ilford EMU Depot.

Following the end of National Express East Anglia's franchise, the Class 379s were operated by Greater Anglia. In September 2016 it was announced that Greater Anglia was procuring a new fleet of Stadler FLIRT EMUs, designated Class 745. These were intended to replace all of the operator's Class 379s by the end of 2019. The new fleet's introduction was delayed: the first Class 745/1 entered service on 28 July 2020. Due to high leasing costs Greater Anglia withdrew the Class 379 fleet from service in February 2022, after which the units were placed in storage.

Originally owned by Macquarie European Rail, the trains transferred to Akiem in April 2020 following Akiem’s acquisition of Macquarie's assets. In March 2024, Porterbrook announced that they had purchased the units from Akiem, and that Govia Thameslink Railway planned to use the trains on Great Northern services. In November 2024, Great Northern announced that all Class 379s had been accepted into their fleet. The trains entered service on Great Northern route services on 10 February 2025.

=== Battery-electric multiple unit trial ===
During 2013, the national infrastructure owning company Network Rail announced that unit 379013 would be used as a testbed for a future battery electric multiple unit. Following several months of conversion work and non-service testing, the unit was used to carry passengers for the first time on a Manningtree–Harwich Town service on 12 January 2015. Throughout its five-week trial period, data was gathered to assess its performance; it could reportedly operate for up to an hour on battery power alone, while charging via the pantograph took two hours.

== Fleet details ==
| Class | Operator | No. built | Year built | Cars per unit | Unit nos. |
|---|---|---|---|---|---|
| Class 379 | Great Northern | 30 | 2010–2011 | 4 | 379001–379030 |

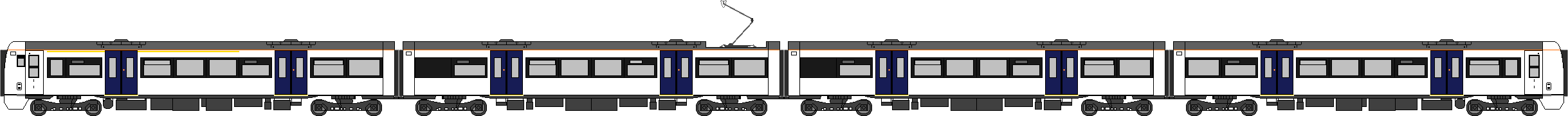
Class 379 diagram

== Named units ==
Named units were as follows:

- 379005 Stansted Express (de-named)
- 379011 Ely Cathedral (de-named)
- 379012 The West Anglian (de-named)
- 379015 City of Cambridge (de-named)
- 379025 Go Discover (de-named)
