= British Rail Class 745 =

Class of electric multiple unit trains in England

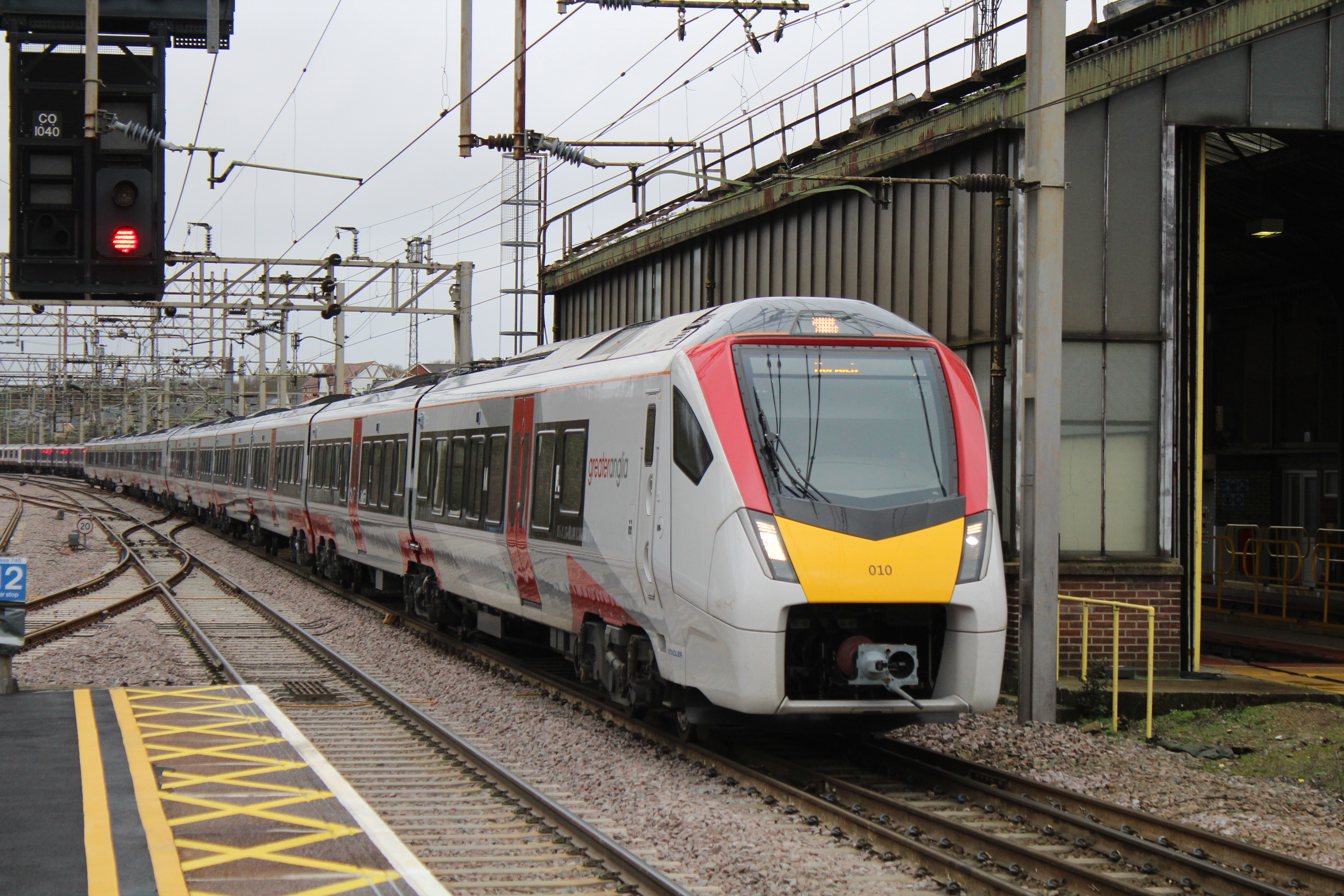
- A Greater Anglia Class 745 at Colchester

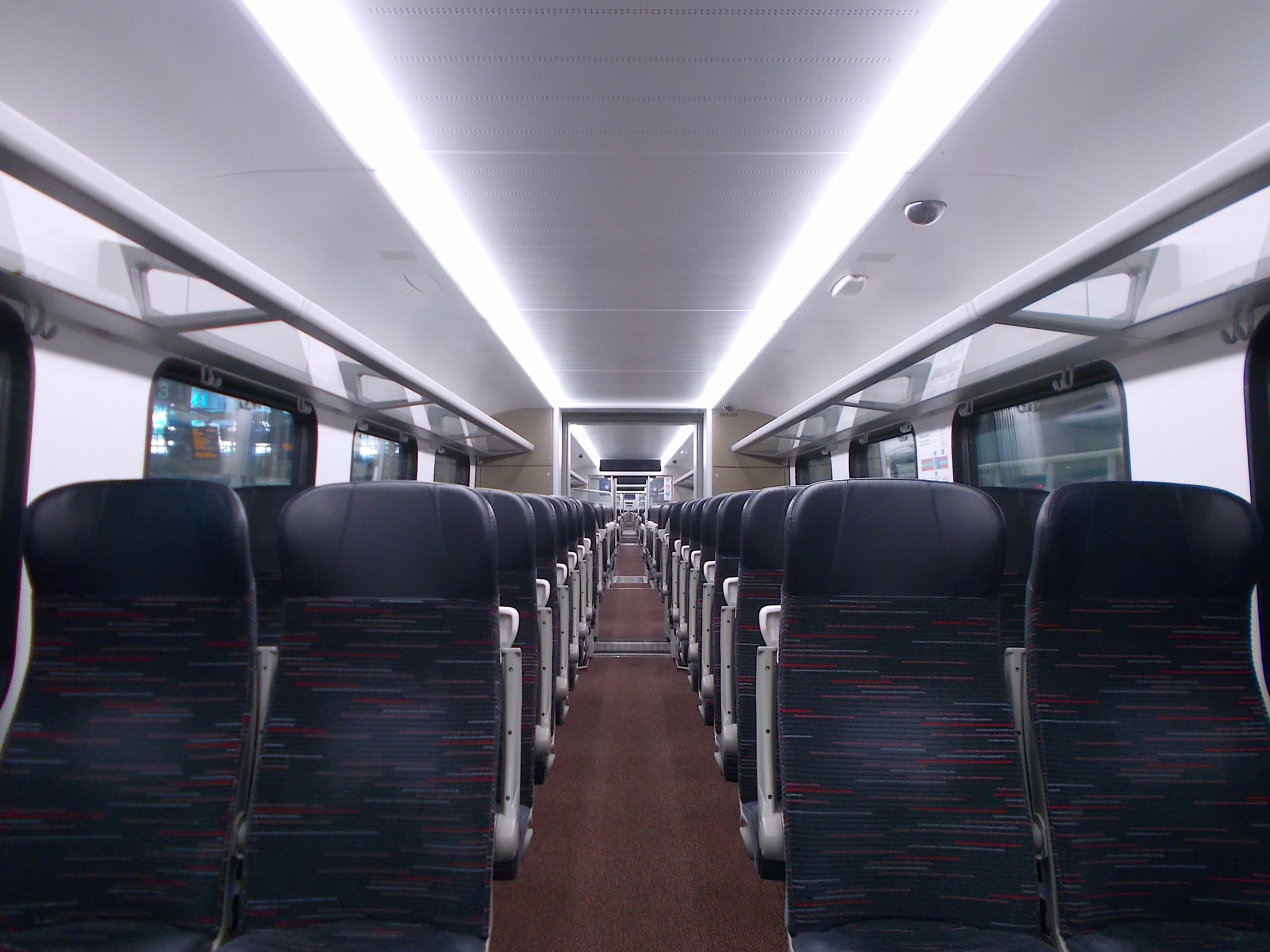
- Class 745 standard class saloon
- In service: 8 January 2020 – present
- Manufacturer: Stadler Rail
- Assembly: Stadler Bussnang AG
- Built at: Bussnang, Switzerland
- Family name: FLIRT
- Replaced: Class 90 electric locomotives and Mark 3 carriages; Class 379
- Constructed: 2018–2020
- Number built: 20
- Formation: 12 cars per unit
- Fleet numbers: 745/0: 745001–745010; 745/1: 745101–745110
- Capacity: 745/0: 704 seats (80 first class, 624 standard); 745/1: 722 seats (all standard-class)
- Owner: Rock Rail
- Operator: Greater Anglia
- Depot: Norwich Crown Point

Specifications
- Car body construction: Aluminium
- Train length: 236.6 m (776 ft 3 in)
- Width: 2.720 m (8 ft 11.1 in)
- Height: 3.915 m (12 ft 10.1 in)
- Floor height: 960 mm (3 ft 2 in)
- Doors: Double-leaf sliding plug, each 1.300 m (4 ft 3.2 in) wide (1 per side per car)
- Wheel diameter: Powered: 870 mm (34 in); Unpowered: 760 mm (30 in)
- Wheelbase: Bogies: 2.700 m (8 ft 10.3 in)
- Maximum speed: 100 mph (160 km/h)
- Traction system: IGBT
- Power output: 5,200 kW (7,000 bhp) at wheel
- Tractive effort: Max. 400 kN (90,000 lbf)
- Acceleration: 0.9 m/s^{2} (3.0 ft/s^{2})
- Electric system: 25 kV 50 Hz AC overhead
- Current collection: Pantograph
- UIC classification: Bo′2′2′+2′2′2′+2′2′Bo′+Bo′2′2′+2′2′2′+2′2′Bo′
- Safety systems: AWS; TPWS; (plus provision for ETCS)
- Coupling system: Dellner
- Multiple working: Not provided
- Track gauge: 4 ft 8 1/2 in (1,435 mm) standard gauge

Notes/references
- Sourced from unless otherwise noted.

The British Rail Class 745 is a class of electric multiple unit passenger trains, built by Stadler as part of the FLIRT grouping. The class was built for Abellio Greater Anglia for use on its inter-city and Stansted Express services. They first entered service on 8 January 2020, after being constructed between 2018 and 2020 in Switzerland.

== History ==
In August 2016, Abellio Greater Anglia was awarded the East Anglia franchise with a commitment to replace all of the existing fleet. An order was placed with Stadler Rail for twenty 12-carriage FLIRT electric multiple units. These new trains are divided into two sub-classes: ten 745/0 and ten 745/1 units. Alongside the related Class 755 units, they would be maintained at Crown Point TMD in Norwich.

The 745/0 units were built to replace the sets of Class 90 electric locomotives, Mark 3 carriages and Driving Van Trailers on the inter-city route between London Liverpool Street and Norwich. The 745/1 units were built to replace the Class 379 fleet used on Stansted Express services.

The interiors of the units feature USB and plug points, air conditioning, free wi-fi, passenger information screens, larger accessible areas, bicycle storage areas and include digital seat reservation displays. All trains have low floors, making the train more accessible for wheelchairs and pushchairs. In comparison with the 745/1 units, the 745/0s include first class accommodation, tables and a bistro; a trolley service also operates on certain trains.

== Operation ==
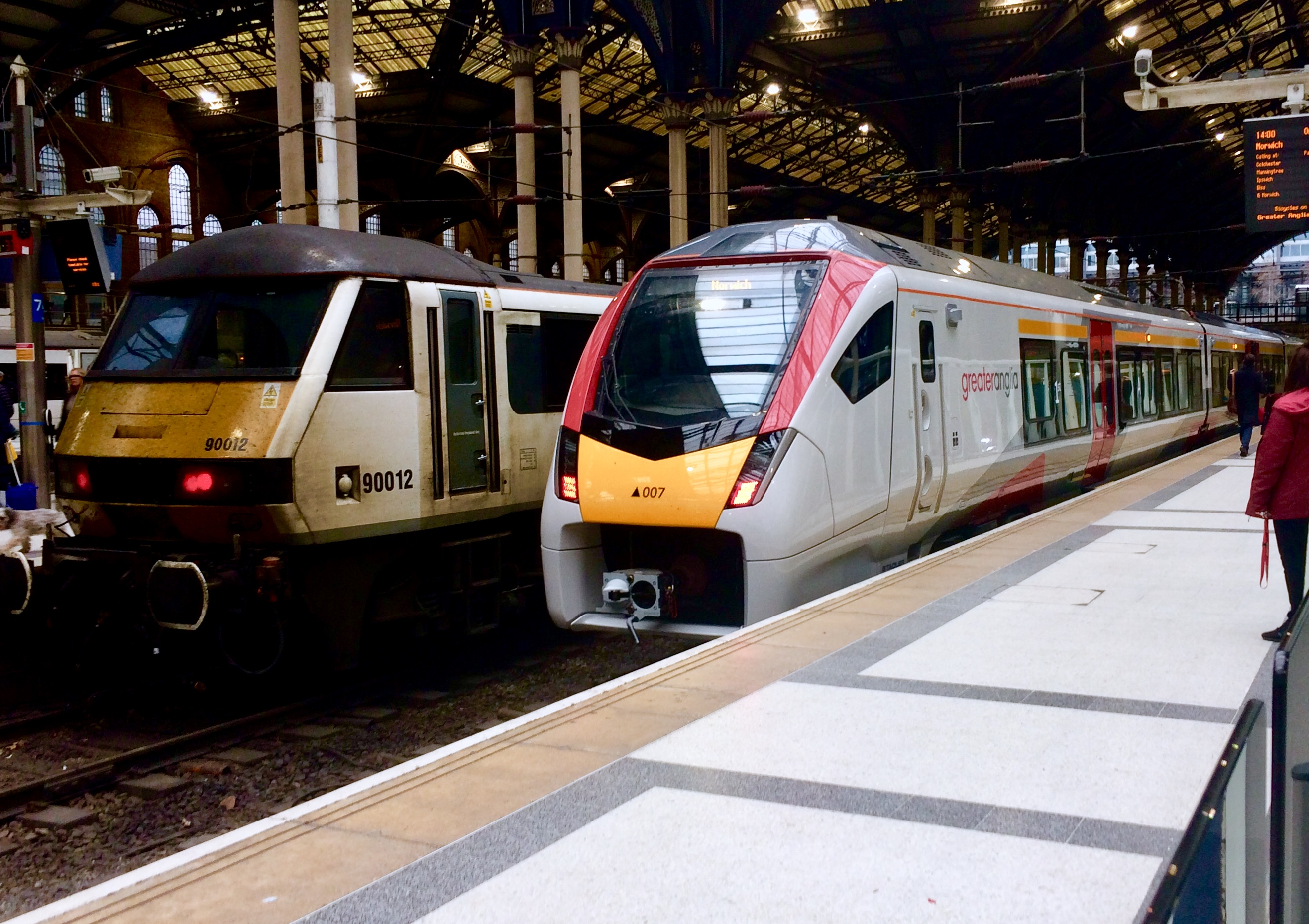
A Class 745 at Liverpool Street, alongside one of the locomotives it has since replaced

The trains were first approved for passenger service in July 2019 and were expected to enter passenger service in late 2019. However, delays in fitting their passenger information systems meant that Greater Anglia instead had to seek a derogation allowing the operation of their Class 90 and Mark 3 sets into 2020.

Following this, the first 745/0 unit entered service on 8 January 2020 on the Norwich to Liverpool Street route and, by April 2020, had entirely replaced the locomotive-hauled fleet.

The first Class 745/1 unit entered service on 30 March 2020, initially on the London-Norwich route, with the first service on the Stansted Express starting on 28 July 2020.

== Technical details ==
Class 745 units of both subclasses are formed of 12 vehicles, which are grouped in pairs that share an unpowered Jacobs bogie. Conventional semi-permanent couplings join each pair of vehicles together, a difference from other FLIRT models (that use Jacobs bogies throughout) necessary in order to provide energy absorption should a collision or derailment occur. Traction motors are carried on four bogies in each unit; one under each driver's cab and one either side of the centremost coupling. Pantographs are fitted to the second and eleventh vehicles in each unit.

== Fleet details ==
| Subclass | Operator | Qty. | Years built | Cars per unit | Unit nos. | Notes |
|---|---|---|---|---|---|---|
| 745/0 | Greater Anglia | 10 | 2018–20 | 12 | 745001–745010 | Inter-city |
| 745/1 | Greater Anglia | 10 | 2018–20 | 12 | 745101–745110 | Stansted Express |

=== Illustration ===
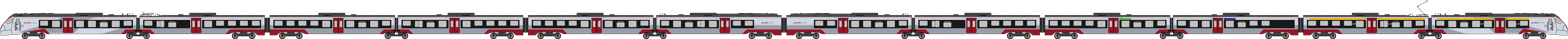
Class 745/0 unit

== See also ==
- Class 231 - A diesel-electric multiple unit variant of the Stadler FLIRT UK platform, built for Transport for Wales.
- Class 755 - A bi-mode multiple unit variant, also built for Greater Anglia.
- Class 756 - A tri-mode multiple unit variant, built for Transport for Wales.
