= List of King George V Playing Fields in Cambridgeshire =

Cambridgeshire
Location	Formal name	Local name (if any)	National Grid Reference	Dates		External links
Location	Formal name	Local name (if any)	National Grid Reference	Purchase	Opening	External links
Cambridge	King George's Field	Trumpington Recreation Ground	TL448548	1951		
Cottenham	King George's Field	n/a	TL444675	1939		
Huntingdon (Sapley Road)	King George's Field	Sapley Park	TL248738	1955		
Huntingdon (St Peters Road)	King George's Field	n/a	TL236726	1955		
Papworth Everard	King George's Field	n/a	TL285630	1950		
Ramsey	King George's Field	n/a	TL287853	1951		
Whittlesford	King George's Field	The Lawns	TL474483	1960		
