= Whittlesford =

Village in Cambridgeshire, England

Coordinates: 52°06′48″N 0°09′04″E

- Village
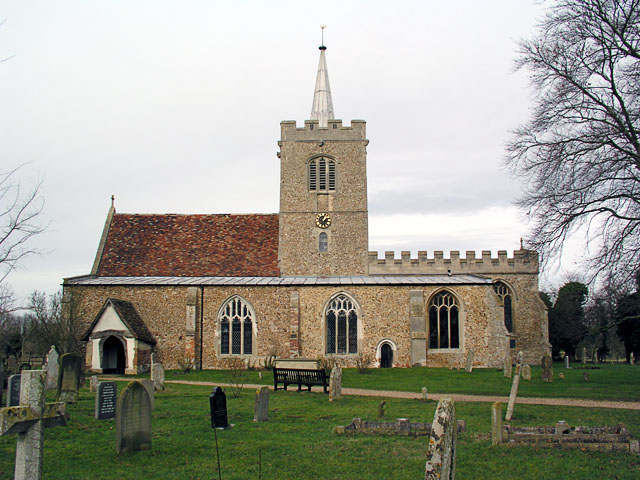
- Whittlesford, SS Mary & Andrew

- Location within Cambridgeshire
- Population: 1,568 (2001); 1,536 (2011)
- OS grid reference: TL474483
- District: South Cambridgeshire
- Shire county: Cambridgeshire
- Region: East
- Country: England
- Sovereign state: United Kingdom
- Post town: Cambridge
- Postcode district: CB22
- Dialling code: 01223
- Police: Cambridgeshire
- Fire: Cambridgeshire
- Ambulance: East of England
- UK Parliament: South Cambridgeshire

Whittlesford is a village in Cambridgeshire, England, and also the name of an old hundred. The village is situated on the Granta branch of the River Cam, seven miles south of Cambridge. Whittlesford Parkway railway station serves the village.

Listed as Witelesforde in the Domesday Book, the name Whittlesford means "ford of a man called Wittel", indicating the importance of a local ford across the river in the village.

== History ==
The parish lies to the west of the River Cam, just to the north of the Icknield Way, an ancient thoroughfare which forms the historic parish boundary on the south. The parish contains 1,976 acres, and the area was occupied in Roman times.

A hospital, then a form of almshouse, was founded in the village by Sir William Colville before the time of Edward I, and there are some remains of the original building still standing. Whittlesford was at one stage a market town.

Roger Ascham, the tutor of Elizabeth I, lived in Whittlesford, and a road in the village is named after him.

== Church ==
The first record of the church in Whittlesford dates from 1217, but there has certainly been a church on the present site since at least Norman times. The church has been dedicated to Saint Andrew since medieval times, and from the 16th century the dedication to Saint Mary was added.

The present building consists of a chancel and nave with south chapel, south aisle and a central tower. It is built of field stones with ashlar dressings. The north wall of the nave dates from the 11th century Norman church as well as the base of the tower and several south windows. The chancel dates from the 13th century and the south chapel from the 15th century.

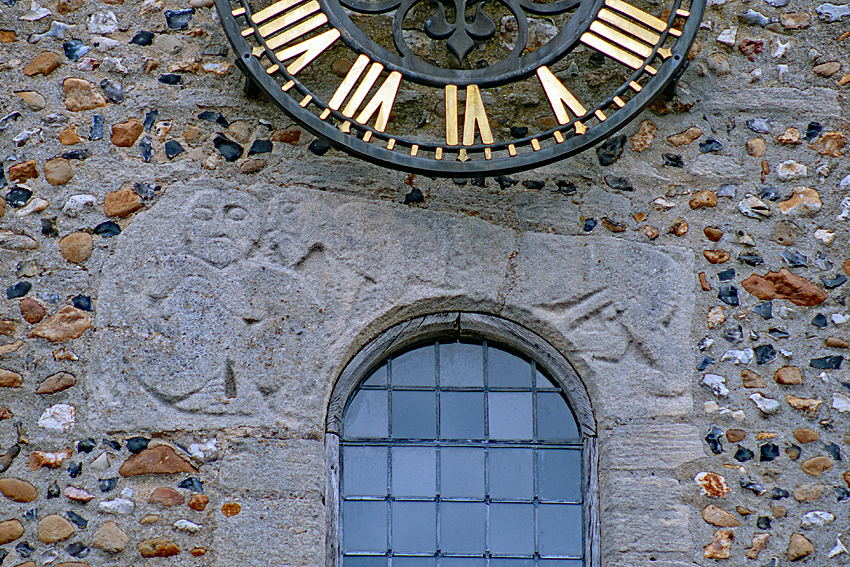
Sheela na Gig

The church contains a square 13th century font. A late 12th or early 13th-century Sheela na Gig can be observed on a high window arch of the church, accompanied by an ithyphallic male figure.

Between the 17th and 19th centuries, the church had strong links with Jesus College, Cambridge and vicars were frequently fellows of the college. It is a Grade I listed building.

In 2023, to celebrate the 1000 anniversary of the original building, a stained glass window designed by Benjamin Finn and inspired by scenes from the COVID-19 pandemic, was installed in the church.

A Primitive Methodist chapel was built in the village in the early 19th century, but was closed before the end of the century. A Congregational chapel was built in 1903.

== Village life ==
The village now has two public houses, the Tickell Arms (named after the Tickell family, former lords of the manor), and the Bees in the Wall, but it formerly had many more; in 1851 there were six pubs, and by 1904 there were eight. Most notable among these was the Waggon and Horses that closed in 1937. The two surviving pubs are both Grade II listed.

The village is served by the William Westley Church of England Primary School, named after the 18th century businessman who endowed the village's first school in his 1723 will.

Whittlesford has a King George's Field in memorial to King George V, known locally as 'The Lawn'.

== Hill figure ==
In September 2004, a cropmark in a surrounding field surfaced, resembling a horse, discovered by the Whittlesford Society Archive Project by aerial photography, similar to how the Rockley Horse was discovered. This led to speculation that this was possibly the site of a newly discovered hill figure of a white horse. The mark particularly resembled the Uffington White Horse.
