= Papworth Everard =

Village in Cambridgeshire, England

Coordinates: 52.25467°N 0.11889°W

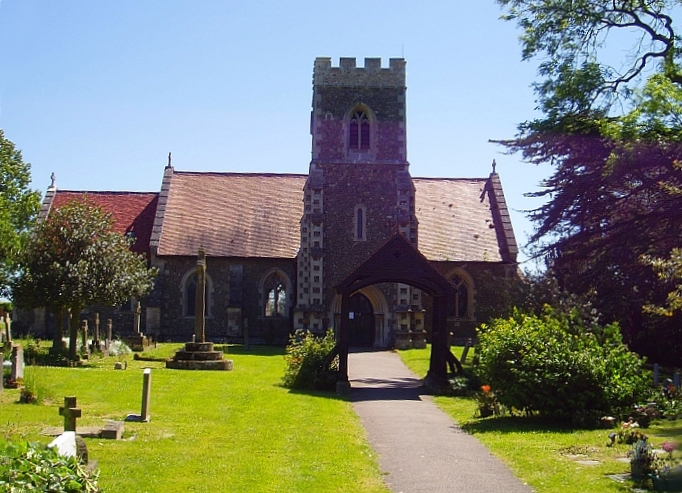
- St Peter's Church, Papworth Everard

- Location within Cambridgeshire
- Population: 2,880 (2011 Census)
- OS grid reference: TL285635
- District: South Cambridgeshire
- Shire county: Cambridgeshire
- Region: East
- Country: England
- Sovereign state: United Kingdom
- Post town: CAMBRIDGE
- Postcode district: CB23
- Dialling code: 01480
- Police: Cambridgeshire
- Fire: Cambridgeshire
- Ambulance: East of England

Papworth Everard is a village in Cambridgeshire, England. It lies ten miles west of Cambridge and six miles south of Huntingdon. Running through its centre is Ermine Street, the old North Road (now the A1198) and the Roman highway that for centuries served as a major artery from London to York. A bypass now means that most traffic can avoid Ermine Street, and it is traffic-calmed within the village itself.

Today, Papworth Everard is a large village with a thriving community, home to substantial light industry and local business. It was also the centre for the Papworth Trust, a charity that offers housing and training to disabled people (now based in Huntingdon) and formerly the Royal Papworth Hospital, renowned in the field of cardiology and now moved to the Cambridge Biomedical Campus.

== History ==
Recent archaeological work in the area of the Papworth Business Park has shown that there was some Bronze Age activity in the area. In the Roman period when Ermine Street was built, in the first century AD, it is unlikely that there was as yet anything which would now be recognised as a village there. However, the same archaeological work does show signs of Romano-British activity, as well as the road. Roman rule collapsed in Britain in 410 AD. It was at least another two or three centuries before a Saxon leader, probably called 'Papa', established a small settlement about a quarter of a mile to the west of Ermine Street around the site of the present parish church. Indeed, Papworth means "the enclosure of Papa's people"; they were also involved in establishing Papworth St Agnes and Papley Grove. Following the Norman Conquest of 1066, the village and land of Papworth were granted by the new king to a Norman knight, Everard De Beche, from whose name the second element of the village's name is derived. A moated area in the village is the remains of his castle.

== Sport and recreation ==
Papworth Everard has a King George's Field in memorial to King George V. Adjacent to the playing fields are a bowling green, a multi-use games area and a series of all-weather, floodlit tennis courts. The village also has an open-air paddling pool (usually open mid-July to September) in its well equipped children's play area.

Papworth Blasters is the village's local Association football team. They play their home games at King George's Field. They have varying age ranges of teams, from under 7s to under 16s and a men's team.

The village also has a running club, Papworth Runners, and a cycling club, Papworth Peloton.

Papworth Everard also has an allotment association located to the South East of the village. It has just under 40 plots.

== Local facilities and services ==
Papworth Everard is served by a variety of local services, primarily based in the central location of Pendrill Court, between Chequers Lane and Ermine Street. This area is adjacent to the playing fields and provides a central hub for the village. In addition to a combined pharmacy and doctors' surgery on Chequers Lane, the village centre contains a convenience store (incorporating a post office), veterinary surgery, chip shop, library, delicatessen and party business, and a coffee shop and micro-pub. The village hall was fully refurbished and reopened in 2015, under the control of the Parish Council. Plans remain to develop the old print works in the village into a community facility but at present these remain hopeful rather than firm.

Local news and information is published monthly in Papworth News and Views.

== Gallery ==
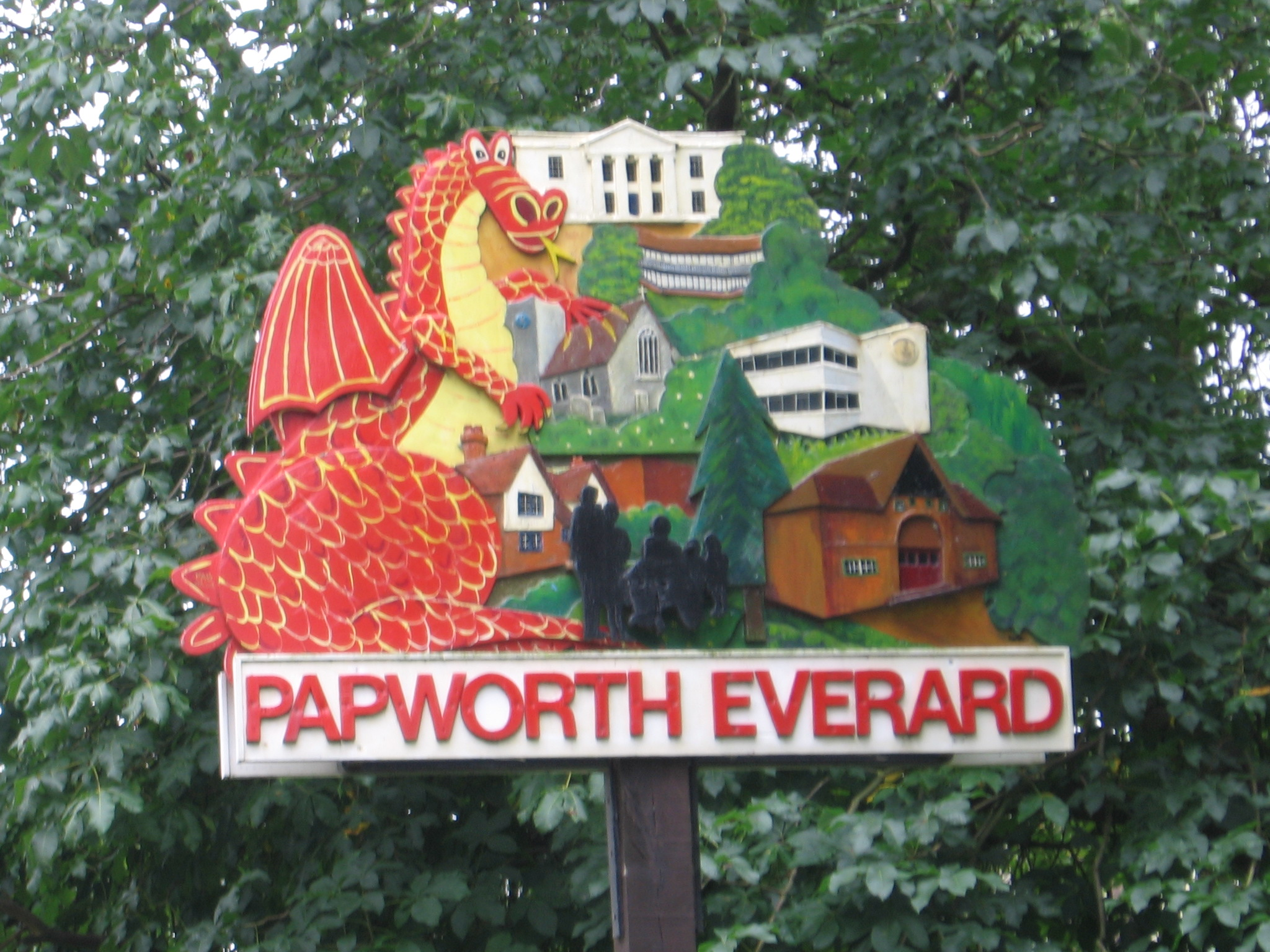
Shield

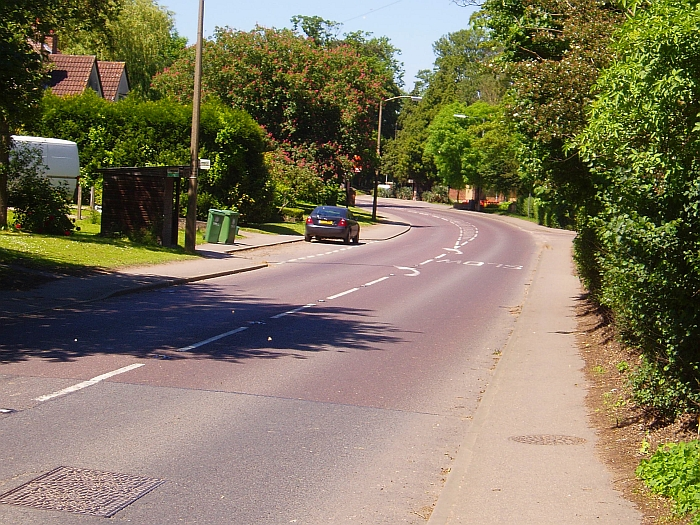
Road

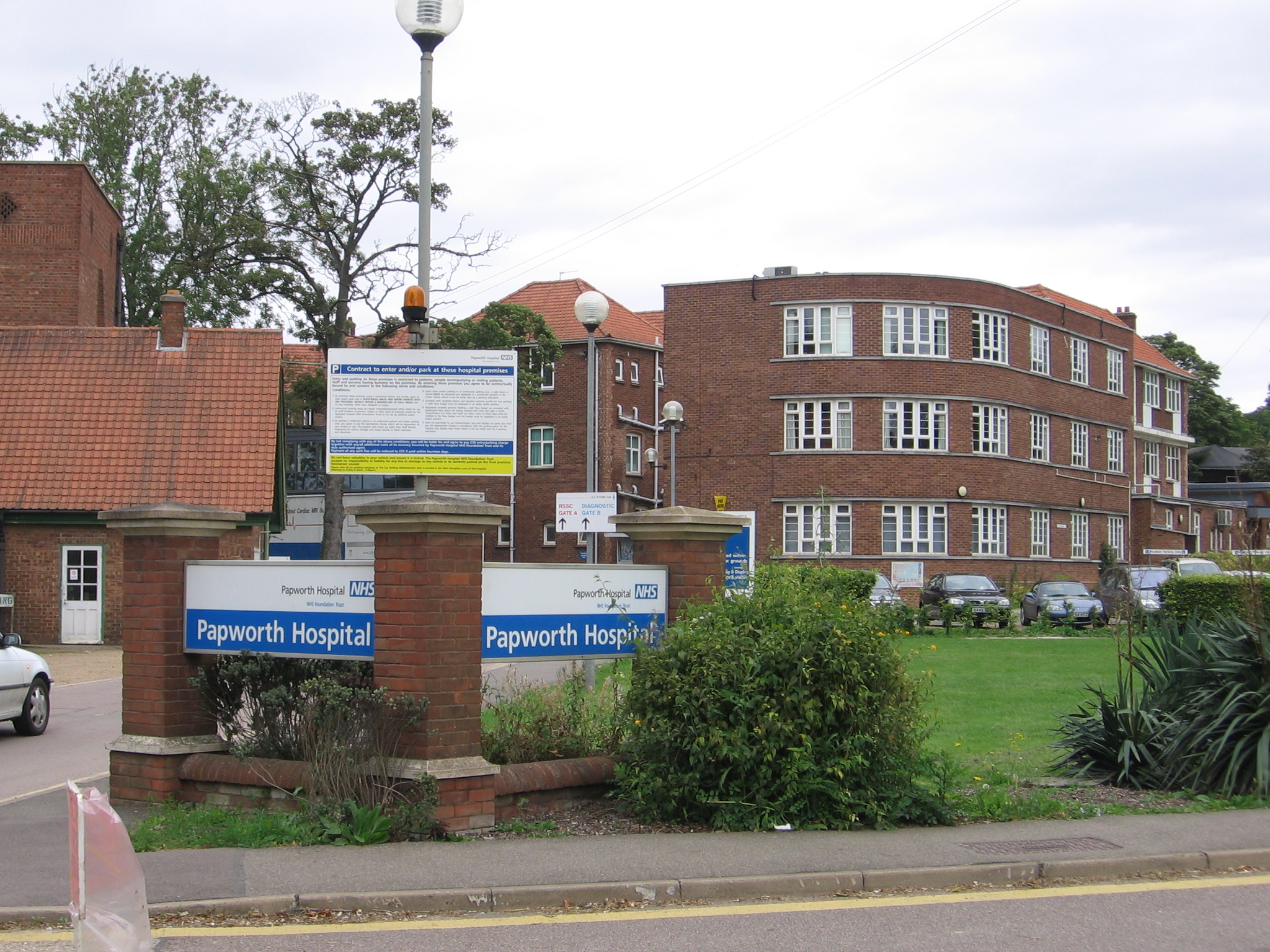
Papworth Hospital
