= Stansted Express =

Railway route connecting London and Stansted Airport, England

Overview
- Franchises: Greater Anglia: Oct 2016–Oct 2025; Abellio Greater Anglia: Feb 2012–Oct 2016; National Express East Anglia: Apr 2004–Feb 2012; West Anglia Great Northern: Jan 1997–Mar 2004
- Main Routes: London Liverpool Street–Stansted Airport (West Anglia Main Line)
- Fleet: 10 Class 745/1 FLIRT
- Stations called at: 6
- Parent company: Greater Anglia
- Reporting mark: SX

Other
- Website: www.stanstedexpress.com

Stansted Express is an airport rail link connecting London Liverpool Street and Stansted Airport. The name is used as a brand of state-owned operator Greater Anglia.

== History ==
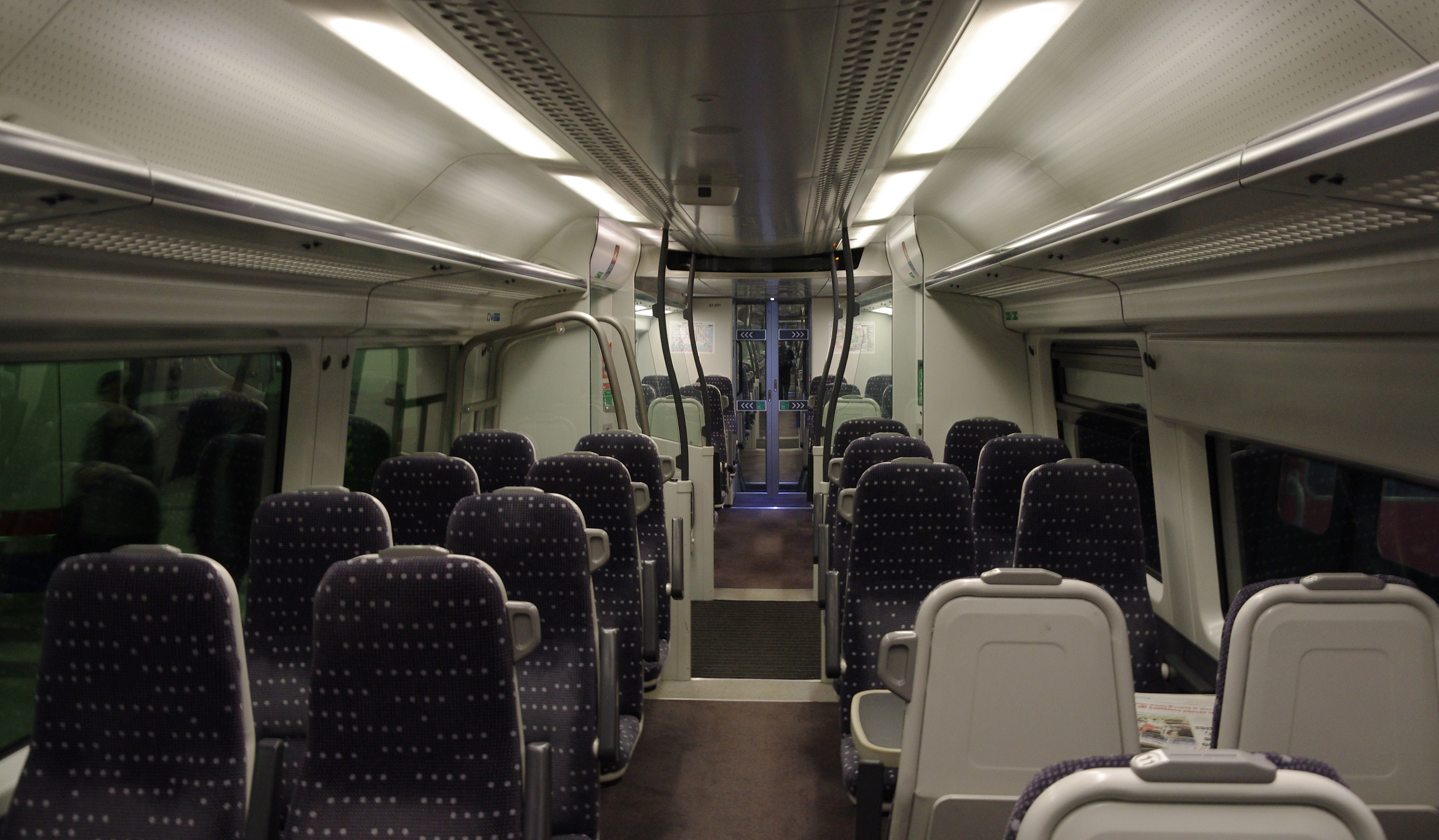
Interior of the Class 379

In 1986, British Rail (BR) extended the electrification of the West Anglia Main Line from Bishop's Stortford to Cambridge; included in this plan was the construction of a new branch line, diverging from a triangular junction at Stansted Mountfitchet. This was in order to serve a new station at Stansted Airport, at which a new terminal was to open in 1991, providing for a large expansion in scheduled aviation passenger services. Therefore, BR decided to build a dedicated fleet of units to work the new Stansted Express service, designated as Class 322, with the service operated by the Network SouthEast sector.

Upon the privatisation of British Rail in 1996, the Stansted Express became part of the West Anglia Great Northern franchise, until the tender was reorganised in 2004; at this time, it became part of the Greater Anglia franchise operated by One Railway (later renamed National Express East Anglia) until February 2012, when the franchise was taken over by Abellio Greater Anglia.

== Operations ==
=== Services ===
Unlike the Heathrow Express and the Gatwick Express (but similarly to other services between London and Heathrow or Gatwick), trains also stop at intermediate stations between the airport and central London. The Stansted Express stops at Tottenham Hale, which provides interchange with the London Underground's Victoria Line. Trains operate every 15 minutes, running to a clock-face schedule and typically take 46 minutes to London Liverpool Street (32 minutes to Tottenham Hale). (Note: Some services take slightly longer, especially around peak times.)

Stansted Express offers several ticket types. In addition to the standard single and return tickets, percentage discounts are available for advance bookings, those travelling in pairs with WebDuo and groups with GroupSave. Every Stansted Express ticket comes with money-saving "2FOR1" (two-for-one) offers on some of London's favourite restaurants, shows and attractions. Oyster are not valid on Stansted Express services to/from Stansted Airport, but contactless and phone payments can be used.

As of December 2025, Stansted Express's general weekday off-peak service pattern in trains per hour (tph) is:

Route	tph	Calling at
London Liverpool Street – Stansted Airport	4	Tottenham Hale; Harlow Town (2 tph); Bishop's Stortford (2 tph); Stansted Mountfitchet (1 tph) (Note: Services alternate between Harlow Town and Bishop's Stortford; with Stansted Mountfitchet being served by those also stopping at Bishop's Stortford (northbound) or Harlow (southbound).)

=== Criticism ===
Transport for London has operated a pay-as-you-go (PAYG) system for public transport services since 2003. Stansted Airport, being located some distance from London, was outside the area covered by this system for a long time, so PAYG could not be used to travel there; instead, a ticket had to be purchased. With 'London' in the name of the airport, rail passengers and visitors to the airport may have incorrectly assumed that they would be able to tap out using a contactless card when arriving at the airport from London stations.

London stations served by the Stansted Express nonetheless always had ticket barriers with readers for contactless and Oyster cards because they are also served by other trains on which PAYG can be used. This meant it was possible for a passenger to board a Stansted Express train having entered the station using their card and then travel to Stansted Airport, where they would be charged a penalty for travelling without a valid ticket. This led to some accusations that Stansted Express was operating a scam, by penalising passengers who were unaware that they had done anything wrong; in 2019, it was reported that the number of penalty charges issued at Stansted Airport was 16,000 per year.

In March 2026, after a short delay, contactless payment was extended to all stations on the West Anglia Main Line as far as Stansted Airport; however, Oyster is not accepted.

== Rolling stock ==
=== Current fleet ===
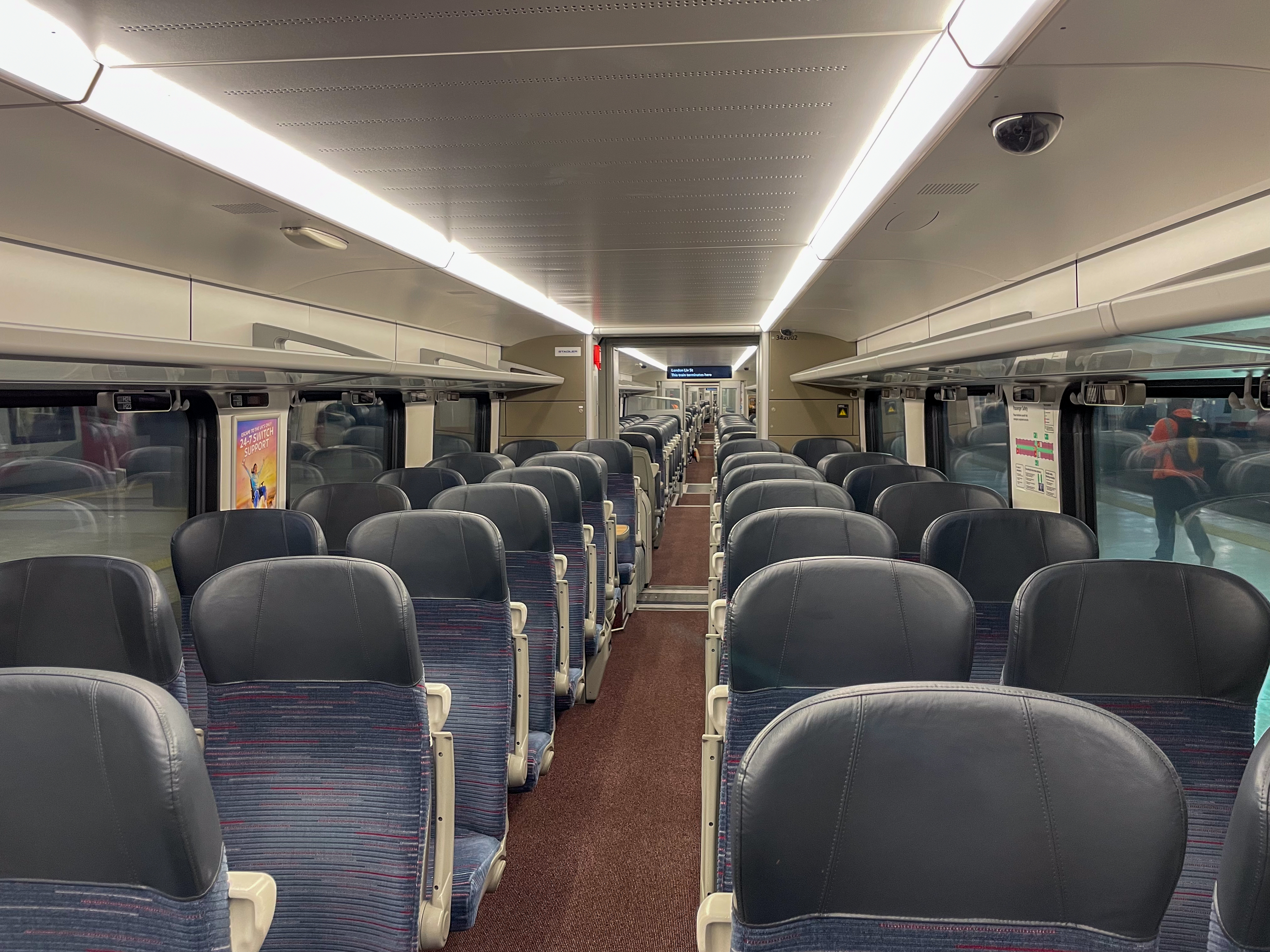
Interior of the Class 745

As part of the 1,300 new carriages to expand Great Britain's passenger rail fleet, Stansted Express was designated to receive 120. In February 2009, it was announced that Bombardier Transportation would manufacture the new trains. Bombardier announced on 2 April that a contract had been signed for the delivery of the 120 coaches between December 2010 and March 2011.

The first of the new Class 379 units entered passenger service on 3 March 2011. The Class 379s were later replaced by Class 745/1s, the first of which entered service on 28 July 2020.

Class	Image	Type	Top speed		Number	Routes operated	Built
Class	Image	Type	mph	km/h	Number	Routes operated	Built
745/1 FLIRT		Electric multiple unit	100	161	10	London Liverpool Street – Stansted Airport	2018–2020

=== Past fleet ===
Stansted Express originally used a fleet of five Class 322 electric multiple units (EMUs) until it was decided to change to a dedicated fleet of nine Class 317/7 EMUs in 2000, further supplemented by twelve Class 317/8s in 2006.

The displaced Class 322s were redeployed on several other routes/franchises around the country before settling into their former role in Scotland, working services between Glasgow Central/Edinburgh Waverley and North Berwick; they stayed there for some time before transferring to Northern Rail, working out of Leeds. They eventually returned to workings out of London Liverpool Street on the Great Eastern Main Line, as Greater Anglia needed replacements for the Class 360s that had been sent to East Midlands Railway. They were withdrawn from service by the end of 2022.

Following the arrival of the new Class 379 units on Stansted Express services, the Class 317/8s were used alongside Class 317/5 and 317/6 units as a common pool. However, since Abellio took over the East Anglia franchise on 5 February 2012, all but one of the Class 317/7s have been scrapped.

Class	Image	Type	Top speed		Number	Routes operated	Built	Withdrawn
Class	Image	Type	mph	km/h	Number	Routes operated	Built	Withdrawn
317/7		Electric multiple unit	100	160	9	London Liverpool Street – Stansted Airport	1981–1982	2011
317/8		Electric multiple unit	100	160	12	London Liverpool Street – Stansted Airport	1981–1982	2011
322		Electric multiple unit	100	160	5	London Liverpool Street – Stansted Airport	1990	2000
379 Electrostar		Electric multiple unit	100	160	30	London Liverpool Street – Stansted Airport	2010–2011	2020

== See also ==
- Gatwick Express - express service between London Victoria and Gatwick Airport
- Heathrow Express - express service between London Paddington and Heathrow Airport
- Luton Airport Express - express service between London St Pancras and Luton Airport Parkway.

== Notes ==
Preceded by Network SouthEast; As part of British Rail	Sub-brand of West Anglia Great Northern franchise 1997–2004	Succeeded by One; Greater Anglia franchise
Preceded by West Anglia Great Northern; West Anglia Great Northern franchise	Sub-brand of Greater Anglia franchise 2004–2012	Succeeded by Greater Anglia (2012–2025)
Preceded by National Express East Anglia; Greater Anglia franchise	Sub-brand of Greater Anglia franchise 2012–2016	Succeeded by Greater Anglia (2012–2025); East Anglia franchise
Preceded by Abellio Greater Anglia; Greater Anglia franchise	Sub-brand of East Anglia franchise 2016–2025	Succeeded by Greater Anglia
Preceded by Greater Anglia (2012–2025); East Anglia franchise	Sub-brand of Greater Anglia; 2025 – present	Incumbent
