= Stansted Mountfitchet railway station =

Railway station in Essex, England

Coordinates: 51.901°N 0.200°E

Stansted Mountfitchet
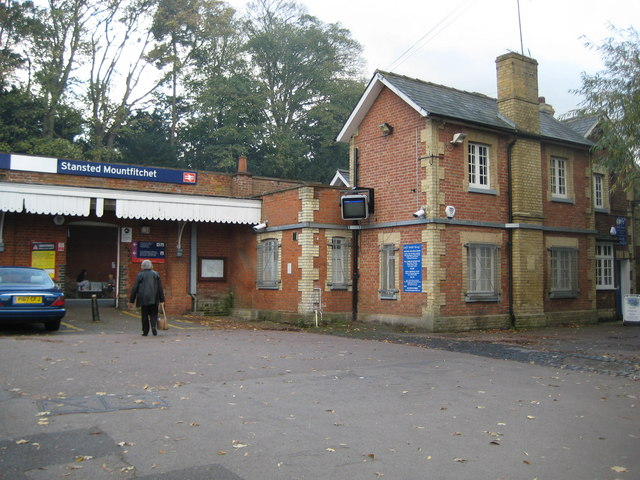

General information
- Location: Stansted Mountfitchet, District of Uttlesford; England
- Grid reference: TL514248
- Manager: Greater Anglia
- Platforms: 2

Other information
- Station code: SST
- Classification: DfT category E

Key dates
- 1845: Opened as Stansted
- 1990: Renamed Stansted Mountfitchet

Passengers
- 2020/21: ▼0.150 million
- Interchange: ▼1,394
- 2021/22: ▲0.406 million
- Interchange: ▲4,785
- 2022/23: ▲0.455 million
- Interchange: ▲20,406
- 2023/24: ▲0.537 million
- Interchange: ▼10,369
- 2024/25: ▲0.551 million
- Interchange: ▲11,591
Location
Notes
- Passenger statistics from the Office of Rail and Road

Stansted Mountfitchet railway station is a stop on the West Anglia Main Line, serving the village of Stansted Mountfitchet in Essex, England. It is 33 miles 28 chains (53.7 km) down the line from London Liverpool Street and is situated between Bishop's Stortford and Elsenham on the main line; Stansted Airport station follows on the airport branch. Its three-letter station code is SST.

== History ==
The station, which was opened by the Eastern Counties Railway in 1845, was known originally as Stansted. It was renamed in 1990 to avoid potential confusion with the forthcoming station at Stansted Airport, although a local resident, Joseph J. Green, had requested such a name change as early as 1890.

The original station building features a ticket office and passenger information screens as well as the flip clock from the Network SouthEast period on the London-bound platform. Both platforms were extended to accommodate 12-coach trains in 2011.

== Services ==
All services at Stansted Mountfitchet are operated by Greater Anglia, including some services which operate under the Stansted Express brand.

The typical off-peak service in trains per hour (tph) is:

- 2 tph to London Liverpool Street
- 1 tph to Stansted Airport
- 1 tph to Cambridge North

During peak hours, the station is served by an additional hourly service between London Liverpool Street and Cambridge North; it is also served by a small number of peak hour services to and from Ely.

Preceding station	National Rail	Following station
Bishop's Stortford	Stansted Express Stansted Express	Stansted Airport
Bishop's Stortford	Greater Anglia West Anglia Main Line	Elsenham
