= Stansted Airport railway station =

Railway station in Essex, England

Coordinates: 51.889°N 0.261°E

Stansted Airport
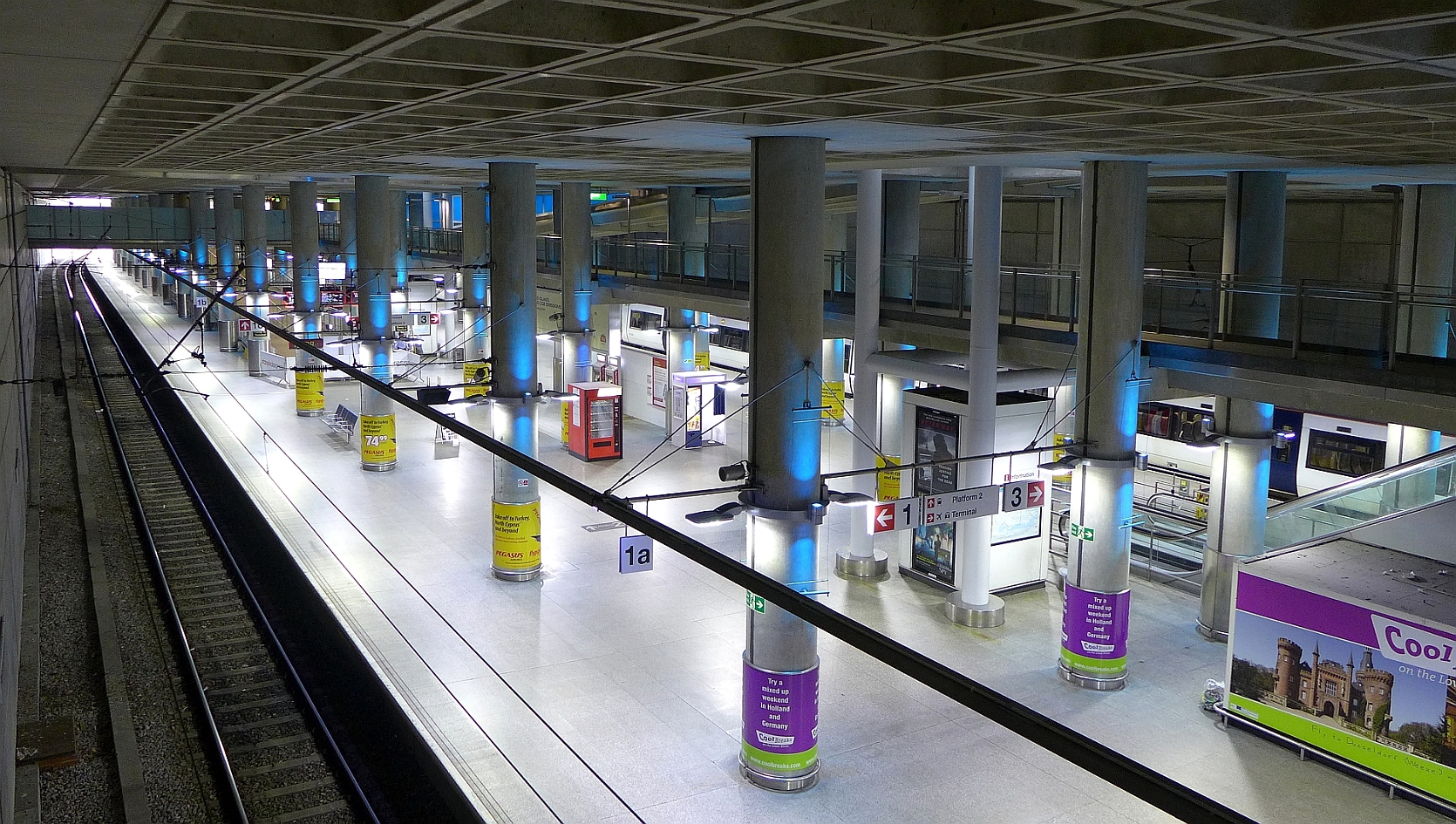

General information
- Location: London Stansted Airport, District of Uttlesford, England
- Grid reference: TL556235
- Manager: Greater Anglia
- Platforms: 3

Construction
- Structure type: At-grade

Other information
- Station code: SSD
- Classification: DfT category B

History
- Opened: 1991
- Original company: British Rail

Passengers
- 2020/21: ▼0.795 million
- Interchange: ▼445
- 2021/22: ▲3.369 million
- Interchange: ▲1,479
- 2022/23: ▲7.906 million
- Interchange: ▲2,583
- 2023/24: ▲9.281 million
- Interchange: ▼2,109
- 2024/25: ▲10.091 million
- Interchange: ▲2,276
Location
Notes
- Passenger statistics from the Office of Rail and Road

Stansted Airport railway station serves London Stansted Airport, in Essex, England. It is the northern terminus of a branch line off the West Anglia Main Line, to which the dedicated Stansted Express service operates. The station lies 36 miles 67 chains (59.3 km) down the line from London Liverpool Street.

The station and branch line were opened in 1991 by British Rail to coincide with the completion of the airport's new terminal building. With over 9 million passengers in 2023-24 it is the busiest station in Essex, the second busiest in the East of England and the sixteenth busiest in the country outside of London.

== History ==
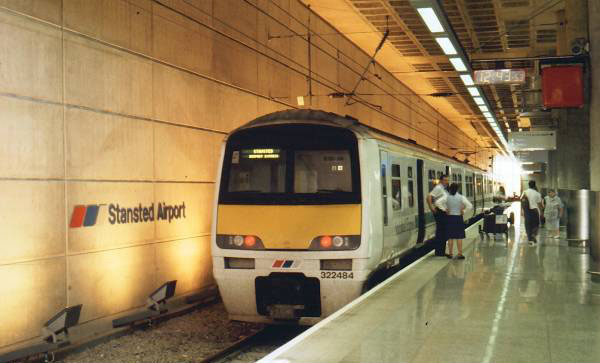
The newly-opened station

The construction of the station and its branch line was part of the development of Stansted into London's third airport. In June 1985, the UK Parliament approved the expansion of the airport. In November 1985, British Rail submitted a proposal for a rail link to the airport, which included a new double-track branch line connecting to the West Anglia Main Line, north of Stansted Mountfitchet (which was Stansted railway station at the time). The line included a bored tunnel under the airport's runway, designed by Sir William Halcrow & Partners, and built by John Murphy Ltd.

Construction began in 1988 and the branch was completed in 1991, at a cost of £44 million. The station opened on 19 March 1991, alongside the new terminal building. It became fully operational following its inauguration by Queen Elizabeth II, who travelled on the first Stansted Express service from London Liverpool Street.

== Layout ==
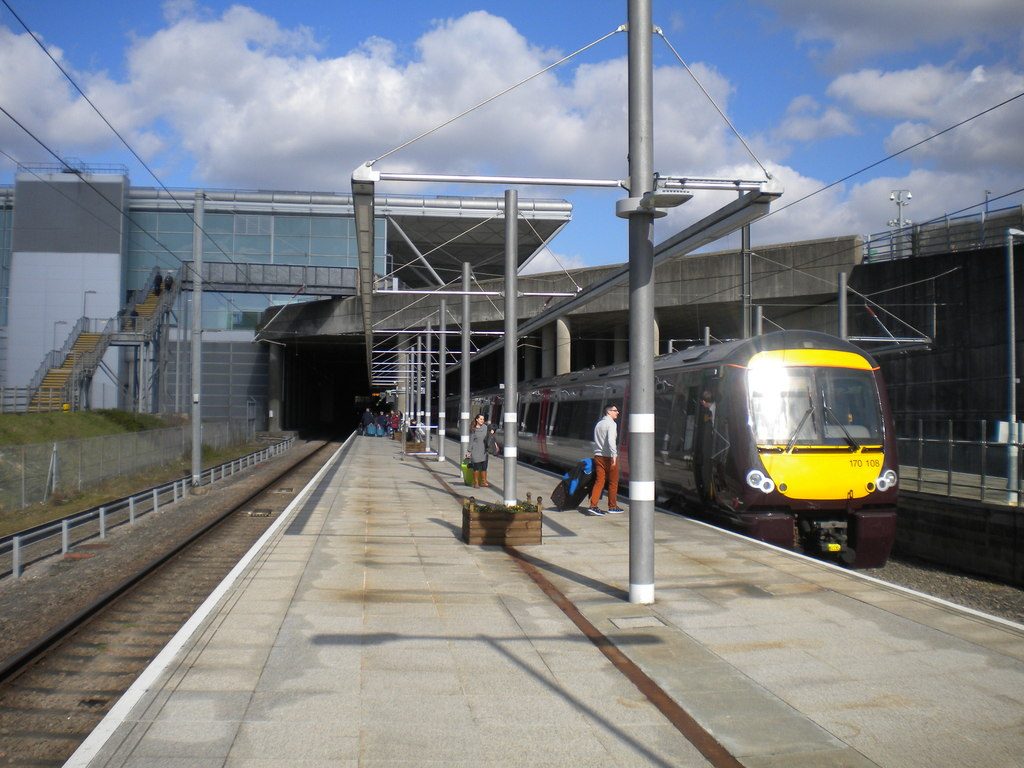
A view of the western platforms, 2016

Stansted Airport station is situated in a concrete box structure at ground level, directly beneath the terminal building, with the western end of the platforms which left open. It was designed with three platforms, located at ground level beneath the terminal. Platforms 1 and 3 run the full length of the station; they are used for the Stansted Express and services to Norwich. The shorter platform 2 is used for the CrossCountry-operated services to Birmingham New Street. In 2011, platform 1 was extended to accommodate two trains simultaneously, in combinations of up to 16 coaches, and platform 2 was extended to accommodate four-coach trains.

With the planned introduction of the contactless travel payment option pending, gated ticket barriers were installed in 2025.

== Future plans ==
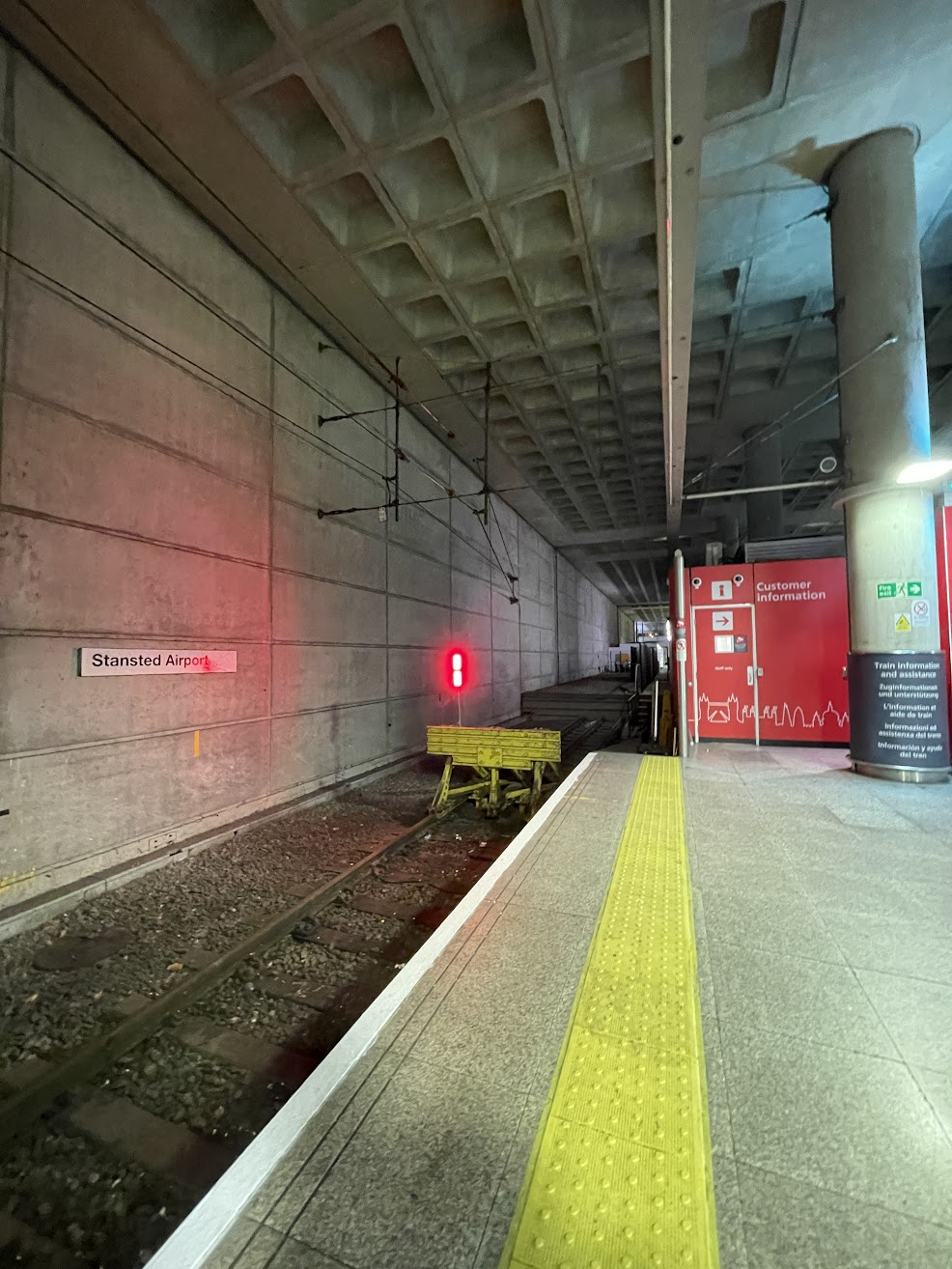
The eastern platform, with provision for through tracks in the future

It was designed with passive provision to become a through station, to allow for a possible future extension of the railway line towards Braintree. Proposals for this extension have periodically resurfaced, including a 2020 review by Essex County Council exploring the feasibility of reintroducing the Bishop's Stortford–Braintree branch line in Essex.

== Services ==
Services at Stansted Airport are operated by two train operating companies; the typical off-peak service in trains per hour (tph) is:

Greater Anglia, including services under the Stansted Express brand:

- 4 tph to London Liverpool Street, via Tottenham Hale; of which:
  - 2 tph call at Bishop's Stortford
  - 2 tph call at Harlow Town, of which 1 tph also calls at Stansted Mountfitchet
- 1 tph to Norwich, via Cambridge and Ely.

CrossCountry:

- 1 tph to Birmingham New Street, via Cambridge, Ely, Peterborough, Leicester and Nuneaton.

Preceding station	National Rail	Following station
Stansted Mountfitchet, Bishop's Stortford or Harlow Town	Greater Anglia; Stansted Express; London Liverpool Street – Stansted Airport	Terminus
Audley End	Greater Anglia; Norwich – Stansted Airport	Terminus
Cambridge South	CrossCountry; Birmingham New Street – Stansted Airport	Terminus
