= South Central Hockey =

- Sport: Field Hockey
- Jurisdiction: South of England
- Abbreviation: SCH
- Affiliation: England Hockey

The South Central Hockey Association is the organising body for field hockey in the South of England. It feeds teams into the Men's and Women's England Hockey Leagues and takes teams from sub-regional leagues.

== League Structure ==
The men's and women's South Central Hockey league structure consists of a Premier Division 1 that feeds into the National League, a Premier Division 2, regional divisions and then sub-regional divisions. The South Central area covers the following four counties:

- Berkshire
- Buckinghamshire
- Hampshire
- Oxfordshire

England Hockey restructured regional hockey governing bodies in 2021. Leagues previously administered by the Southern Counties Hockey Association were split between South East Hockey and South Central Hockey. Sub-regional hockey associations were dissolved, with the new regional bodies administering all leagues below the England Hockey national leagues. The South Central Hockey men's league was previously part of the South Hockey League and women's league was previously part of the South Clubs' Women's Hockey League.

== Champions ==
Extended content

=== South Central Men's Premier Division 1 ===
Season	Champions	Runners Up
2000–01	Maidenhead M1s	Wimbledon M1s
2001–02	City of Portsmouth M1s	Purley Walcountians M1s
2002–03	Old Georgians M1s	Beckenham M1s
2003–04	Holcombe M1s	Beckenham M1s
2004–05	Oxted M1s	Ashford M1s
2005–06	Bromley & Beckenham M1s	Brighton & Hove M1s
2006–07	Sevenoaks M1s	Ashford M1s
2007–08	Fareham M1s	Chichester M1s
2008–09	Fareham M1s	Chichester M1s
2009–10	Wimbledon M1s	Spencer M1s
2010–11	Teddington M1s	London Wayfarers M1s
2011–12	Richmond M1s	London Wayfarers M1s
2012–13	Brighton & Hove M1s	University of Oxford M1s
2013–14	Chichester M1s	Sevenoaks M1s
2014–15	Sevenoaks M1s	Old Georgians M1s
2014–15	Old Georgians M1s	Havant M1s
2016–17	Havant M1s	Bromley & Beckenham M1s
2017–18	Oxford Hawks M1s	London Edwardians M1s
2018–19	Old Cranleighan M1s	Bromley & Beckenham M1s
2019-20	London Wayfarers M1s	Hampstead & Westminster M2s
2020–21	Cancelled due to COVID-19	
2021–22		
2022–23	Banbury M1s	Marlow M1s
2023–24	Reading M2s	Oxford OBU M1s
2024–25	Marlow M1s	Trojans M1s
2025–26	Trojans M1s	Staines M1s

=== South Central Women's Premier Division 1 ===
Season	Champions	Runners Up
2000–01		
2001–02	Wimbledon W1As	Epsom W1s
2002–03	Wimbledon W1As	Epsom W1s
2003–04	Wimbledon W1As	Southampton W1s
2004–05	Horsham W1s	Wimbledon W1s
2005–06	Staines W1s	Epsom W1s
2006–07	Rover Oxford W1s	Southgate W1s
2007–08	Southgate W1s	Epsom W1s
2008–09	Buckingham W1s	Southampton W1s
2009–10	Surbiton W1s	Reading W1As
2010–11	Oxford Hawks W1s	Guildford W1s
2011–12	Wimbledon W1s	Maidenhead W1s
2012–13	East Grinstead W1s	Hampstead & Westminster W1s
2013–14	Maidenhead W1s	Hampstead & Westminster W1s
2014–15	Hampstead & Westminster W1s	Barnes W1s
2015–16	Surbiton W2s	Southgate W1s
2016–17	Barnes W1s	Surbiton W2s
2017–18	Surbiton W2s	Horsham W1s
2018–19	East Grinstead W2s	Guildford W1s
2019-20		
2020–21	Cancelled due to COVID-19	
2021–22		
2022–23	Fareham W1s	Marlow W1s
2023–24	Marlow W1s	Oxford Hawks W2s
2024–25	University of Oxford W1s	Fareham W1s
2025–26	Witney W1s	Oxford W1s
