= Field hockey in England =

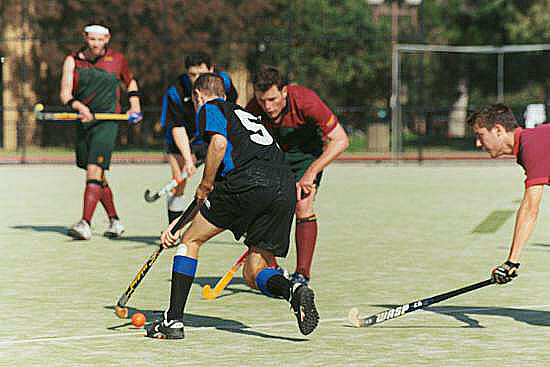
- A game of field hockey in progress
- Governing body: England Hockey
- First played: Early/mid 1800s.
- Registered players: Estimate 117,000
- Clubs: 1050

National competitions
- Men's England Hockey League; Women's England Hockey League

Club competitions
- East Region Hockey Association; Midland Regional Hockey Association; North Hockey Association; Southern Counties Hockey Association; West Hockey Association; London Hockey League

Field hockey in England is usually referred to simply as "hockey" instead of field hockey, whereas other variants of hockey, such as ice hockey, are referred to by their full name.

The sport is played on astroturf pitches. The sport is played on an amateur basis.

== See also ==
- Field hockey in Great Britain
- England Hockey
- England men's national field hockey team
- England women's national field hockey team
