= Bishop's Stortford Hockey Club =

Field Hockey Club in England

- Nickname(s): BSHC
- League: Men's England Hockey League; Women's England Hockey League
- Home ground: Herts and Essex Sports Centre, Beldams Lane

Personnel
- Chairman: Duncan Barber
- Website: www.stortfordhockey.co.uk
Home

Bishop's Stortford Hockey Club is a field hockey club in the town of Bishop's Stortford, Hertfordshire, England. The club plays in the East Region Hockey Association. The home ground is located at The Hertfordshire and Essex High School, where both the clubhouse and pitch are located.

The club has 800 active members and fields a total of sixteen senior sides, seven men's and nine ladies' playing in the East Hockey Leagues. The Men's 1st XI play in the East Men's Premier Division and the Ladies 1st XI play in the East Women's Premier Division.

Bishop’s Stortford Hockey Club has been reaccredited for another 3 years (2022–2025) as a ClubMark club (Sport England), making the club one of a select number across England to achieve the England Hockey ClubMark status.

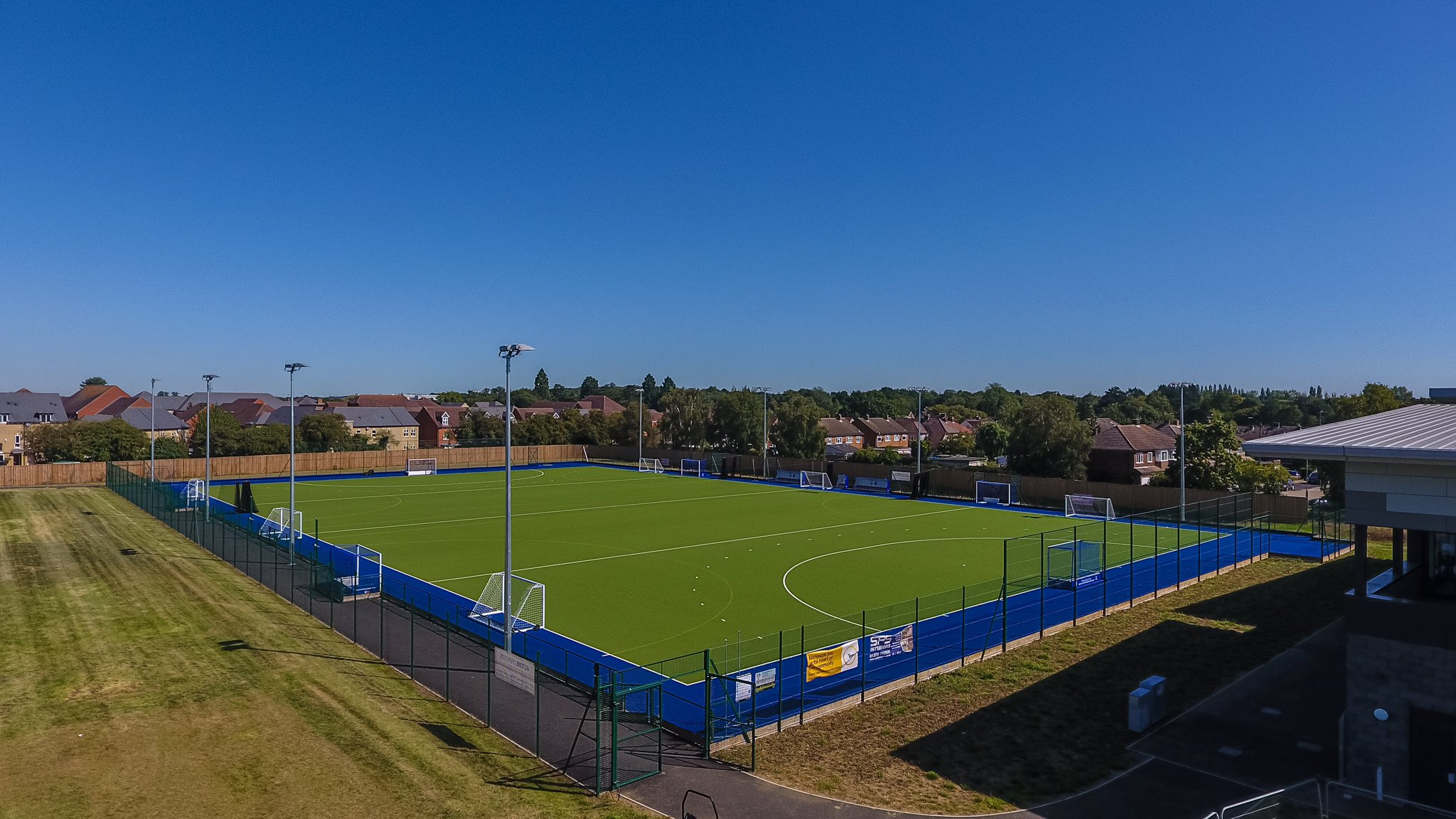
Bishop's Stortford Hockey Club pitch

== History ==
The club formed in 1948 and games were played at Cricket Field Lane, Hockerill Anglo-European College and Sawbridgeworth. The club barely raised a team in the early days, players relied on getting to away fixtures by train and taxi due to the lack of motorcars after World War II. In 1969 the club was elected to the Hertfordshire County League and the East Central League in 1972. Promotion to the East Region Hockey Association was gained in 1975.

The club had a number of successes over the years including County Champions in 1974, 1981 and 1986, East runners-up in 1982 and H.A. Cup quarter finalists in 1982 and 1986. Later successes include the integration of the Ladies Hockey Club and partnership in 1993 with Hockerill Anglo-European College.

In 2019 Bishop’s Stortford Hockey Club moved from Cricket Field Lane to The Hertfordshire and Essex High School, where a state of the art pitch and clubhouse overlooking the pitch with floor to ceiling windows and a balcony was built. The project has been a collaborative one, with funding coming from a variety of bodies and institutions including the Department for Education, Hertfordshire County Council, East Herts District Council, Sport England, Bishop's Stortford Judo Club, Bishop's Stortford Hockey Club as well as staff, students, parents, friends and families.

== Senior Section ==
The senior section offers a wide range of teams to suit all abilities and competitive aspirations. In the 2024-25 season, BSHC fielded 16 senior sides: 7 men’s teams and 9 ladies’ teams competing in the England Hockey East Leagues. This expansion ensures there is a team for every adult player, from elite squads to more social sides.

The Ladies 1st XI had back to back promotions starting from 2019, where they become champions of both the East League Division 1 South and a year later champions in the East Premier Division. This saw the Ladies 1st XI for the first time in club history play in the Vitality Women's Conference East league.

In the 2022-23 season, the Men's 1st XI achieved a significant milestone by securing promotion from East League Division 1 South to the East Men's Premier Division for the 2023-24 season. This accomplishment positioned them among the elite clubs in the region.

== Junior Section ==
The clubs junior hockey caters for children from ages 5 to 18 and provides an opportunity to the local schools in the area, where hockey is not a mainstay of the PE or extra-curricular offer. The club also offers to other groups such as a new initiative in partnership with Grove Cottage to offer disability hockey.

Overall the club has developed a thriving junior section with over 500 members and runs hockey camps throughout the year, such as hockey training programmes with EVO Hockey.

The junior section recently linked up with investment services group Ravenscroft, who'll be known as the “Ravens”. The sponsorship will help provide several hockey programmes for children aged from 5 to 16 in the local community. The sponsorship of the Bishop’s Stortford Ravens aims to encourage young players to learn and develop their hockey and team skills through sessions organised in club and community environments, as well as local schools such as The Hertfordshire and Essex High School, Hockerill Anglo-European College, Northgate Primary, Windhill Primary and Fawbert & Barnard Infant’s Primary.

== Community Involvement and Outreach Programs ==
Community engagement is at the heart of BSHC’s mission, and the club runs numerous programs to promote hockey in the local area, foster inclusivity, and give back to the community. In parallel, BSHC has cultivated a vibrant club culture that emphasises social connection as much as sporting success. Key community and outreach initiatives include

- Extensive Junior Development: The junior section’s success is itself a community story. By welcoming over 500 local children, the club not only trains future players but also promotes healthy, active lifestyles among youth. BSHC’s junior coaches (many of whom are volunteer parents or club players) often go into nearby primary and secondary schools to run hockey taster sessions. This outreach has introduced hockey to schools where it was not traditionally offered, helping hockey gain popularity. Notably, the partnership with The Hertfordshire and Essex High School has yielded dividends – for instance, the school’s U14 girls team won silver in a national schools competition, aided by coaching support from the club.
- Inclusivity Programs: BSHC is proudly inclusive. The Flyerz hockey program (Flyerz is the UK name for disability-inclusive hockey) stands out; the club provides hockey opportunities for children and adults with learning and physical disabilities. This includes specialist coaching sessions adapted to various needs. The initiative not only allows those with disabilities to enjoy the game, but it also educates all club members on inclusivity and has built a diverse hockey community. England Hockey has recognised clubs like BSHC for embracing Flyerz hockey, often citing them as examples in growing the sport’s accessibility.
- Back to Hockey: After the 2012 London Olympic BSHC actively sought to bring new people into the sport. The Back to Hockey program provides casual, friendly training for adults who are new to hockey or perhaps haven’t played since school. This has been particularly successful in attracting women; in fact, the club observed a 30–40% increase in female participation after 2012, well above the national average growth rate. These sessions are often run in the summer or early season and focus on basic skills and small-sided games in a non-intimidating environment. Many participants of Back to Hockey have gone on to join the regular teams or simply continue in the social hockey circle, demonstrating how BSHC lowers entry barriers to the sport.
- Social Events and Club Culture: BSHC's goal is creating a strong internal community. The club has a busy social calendar to bring members together off the pitch. Regular events include quiz nights, games nights, themed parties, an annual dinner-dance, and a popular end-of-season awards night. One unique tradition is the “Chairman’s Band Night”, where the Club Chairman hosts a live music evening for members. These events are done for bonding between the members; they mix players from different teams and generations, contributing to BSHC’s reputation as a friendly, welcoming club. Even during the COVID-19 lockdowns, the club tries to keep the social spirit alive with virtual quizzes and online meet-ups, ensuring that members stayed connected.
- Community Service and Charity: The club and its members also engage in charitable activities. For example, BSHC often partners with or supports local causes – such as food bank collections at the club, charity fundraising runs, and events like hockey marathons for charity. A recent Hockey Paper article noted how clubs in Hertfordshire (including Bishop’s Stortford) raise money for good causes. While much of that article highlighted another club, it underlines a culture in which BSHC participates: using sport as a way to positively impact the community. BSHC’s junior teams and women’s teams have been involved in fundraising events over the years, reflecting a broader sense of social responsibility instilled by club leaders.

== Olympic Legacy ==
The 2012 London Olympic brought an increased visibility to Field hockey, where 630,000 people watched live hockey during the event, a pattern of continued growth in the sport has emerged and Bishop’s Stortford Hockey Club used this opportuning to attract new and returning players to their Vitality Back to Hockey programme in partnership with England Hockey.

== Honours ==
=== Men ===
- East Division 1 South Champions 2022-23
- East Premier B Champions 2006-07
- East Premier A Runners-up 2002-03
- East Premier A Runners-up 2000-01

=== Women ===
- East Premier Division Champions 2021-22
- East League Division 1 South Champions 2019-20
- East League Division 2 SW Champions 2016-17
- East League Division 2 SW Champions 2009-10

=== Junior ===
- U16 Girls Tier 2 National Cup Runners-up 2022-23

== Notable players ==
The club has a number of current and former international players still involved with coaching or playing at Bishop's Stortford Hockey Club. In addition a number of senior members still represent their country at Masters level.

=== Men's internationals ===
Extended content

Player	Events/Notes	Ref
(England) Vernon Brown		
(England) Robert Clift		
(England) Bernie Cotton		
(England) Charles Jones	Oly (1964)	
(England) Charlie Leonard		
(Scotland) Phil Mathison		
(United States) Craig Smith		
(Scotland) Ronnie Stott		

Key

- Oly = Olympic Games
- CG = Commonwealth Games
- WC = World Cup
- CT = Champions Trophy
- EC = European Championships

=== Women's internationals ===
Extended content

Player	Events	Notes/Ref
(England) Pippa Bull		
(England) Kim Durbin		

Key

- Oly = Olympic Games
- CG = Commonwealth Games
- WC = World Cup
- CT = Champions Trophy
- EC = European Championships
