= Great Britain Super League =

The Great Britain Super League was a short lived field hockey tournament organised by Great Britain Hockey.

It was established in 2007 as a showcase for British hockey talent. The event was run from 2007 until 2012 and is now defunct. The inaugural teams were from England (Wessex Leopards, Saxon Tigers and Pennine Pumas), Scotland (Caledonian Cougars and Highland Jaguars) and Wales (Celtic Panthers) competing. Players from the national leagues represented their relevant region.

== Winners ==
=== Men's Super League ===
Season	Champions	Runners Up
2006–07	Wessex Leopards	Saxon Tigers
2007-08	Saxon Tigers	Pennine Pumas
2008-09	Wessex Leopards	Pennine Pumas

Season	Champions	Runners Up
2009-10	Pennine Pumas	Saxon Tigers
2010-11	Pennine Pumas	Saxon Tigers
2011-12	Pennine Pumas	Saxon Tigers

=== Women's Super League ===
Season	Champions	Runners Up
2006–07	Wessex Leopards	Saxon Tigers
2007-08	Saxon Tigers	Pennine Pumas
2008-09	Pennine Pumas	Saxon Tigers

Season	Champions	Runners Up
2009-10	no competition	
2010-11	Saxon Tigers	Caledonian Cougars
2011-12	Saxon Tigers	Pennine Pumas

== 2006-2007 Super League ==
Men's standings

Pos	Team	P	W	D	L	F	A	Pts
1	Wessex Leopards	5	4	1	0	29	8	13
2	Saxon Tigers	5	4	1	0	18	11	13
3	Caledonian Cougars	5	3	0	2	17	16	9
4	Pennine Pumas	5	2	0	3	18	18	6
5	Highland Jaguars	5	1	0	4	11	24	3
6	Celtic Panthers	5	0	0	5	2	18	0

Final

Team 1	Team 2	Score
Wessex Leopards	Saxon Tigers	3-1

Women's standings

Pos	Team	P	W	D	L	F	A	Pts
1	Saxon Tigers	5	4	1	0	16	2	13
2	Wessex Leopards	5	2	3	0	12	4	9
3	Caledonian Cougars	5	1	2	2	9	10	5
4	Highland Jaguars	5	1	2	2	7	9	5
5	Pennine Pumas	5	1	2	2	6	8	5
6	Celtic Panthers	5	1	0	4	3	20	3

Final

Team 1	Team 2	Score
Wessex Leopards	Saxon Tigers	4-2

== 2007-2008 Super League ==
Men's standings

Pos	Team	P	W	D	L	F	A	Pts
1	Saxon Tigers	3	3	0	0	14	4	9
2	Pennine Pumas	3	1	0	2	10	12	3
3	Caledonian Cougars	3	1	0	2	7	11	3
4	Celtic Panthers	3	1	0	2	5	9	3

Final

Team 1	Team 2	Score
Saxon Tigers	Pennine Pumas	2-2 (3-0p)

Women's standings

Pos	Team	P	W	D	L	F	A	Pts
1	Saxon Tigers	3	3	0	0	11	3	9
2	Pennine Pumas	3	2	0	1	7	8	6
3	Celtic Panthers	3	1	0	2	3	5	3
4	Caledonian Cougars	3	0	0	3	2	7	0

Final

Team 1	Team 2	Score
Saxon Tigers	Pennine Pumas	3-2

== 2008-2009 Super League ==
Men's standings

Pos	Team	P	W	D	L	F	A	Pts
1	Wessex Leopards	5	5	0	0	25	6	15
2	Pennine Pumas	5	4	0	1	18	9	12
3	Caledonian Cougars	5	2	0	3	11	14	6
4	Celtic Panthers	5	1	2	2	7	18	5
5	Highland Jaguars	5	1	1	3	11	15	4
6	Saxon Tigers	5	0	1	4	11	21	1

Women's standings

Pos	Team	P	W	D	L	F	A	Pts
1	Pennine Pumas	4	4	0	0	15	0	12
2	Saxon Tigers	4	2	0	2	6	5	6
3	Caledonian Cougars	4	2	0	2	3	10	6
4	Celtic Panthers	4	0	0	4	1	10	0

== 2009-2010 Super League ==
Men's standings

Pos	Team	P	W	D	L	F	A	Pts
1	Pennine Pumas	4	4	0	0	16	5	12
2	Saxon Tigers	4	1	2	1	8	6	5
3	Highland Jaguars	4	1	1	2	12	15	4
4	Caledonian Cougars	4	1	1	2	6	9	4
5	Celtic Panthers	4	1	0	3	7	14	3

== 2010-2011 Super League ==
Men's standings

Pos	Team	P	W	D	L	F	A	Pts
1	Pennine Pumas	4	4	0	0	18	2	12
2	Saxon Tigers	4	2	1	1	9	7	7
3	Highland Jaguars	4	2	1	1	10	11	7
4	Celtic Panthers	4	1	0	3	4	9	3
5	Caledonian Cougars	4	0	0	4	5	17	0

Women's standings

Pos	Team	P	W	D	L	F	A	Pts
1	Saxon Tigers	4	3	0	0	14	2	9
2	Caledonian Cougars	4	1	1	1	3	5	4
3	Celtic Panthers	4	1	0	2	3	9	3
4	Pennine Pumas	4	0	1	2	4	8	1

Final

Team 1	Team 2	Score
Saxon Tigers	Caledonian Cougars	6-0

== 2011-2012 Super League ==
Men's standings

Pos	Team	P	W	D	L	F	A	Pts
1	Pennine Pumas	3	2	1	0	23	3	5
2	Saxon Tigers	3	2	1	0	18	4	5
3	Celtic Panthers	3	1	0	2	4	22	2
4	Caledonian Cougars	3	1	0	2	2	18	2

Final

Team 1	Team 2	Score
Pennine Pumas	Saxon Tigers	6-5

Women's standings

Pos	Team	P	W	D	L	F	A	Pts
1	Pennine Pumas	3	3	0	0	7	0	6
2	Saxon Tigers	3	2	0	1	9	4	4
3	Caledonian Cougars	3	1	0	2	4	7	2
4	Celtic Panthers	3	0	0	3	0	9	0

Final

Team 1	Team 2	Score
Saxon Tigers	Pennine Pumas	4-0
