= Jason Collins (field hockey) =

British field hockey player (born 1977)

Personal information
- Born: May 1977 (age 49) Worthing, England

Sport
- Sport: Field hockey
- Position: Defender
Senior career
Years	Team	Caps	Goals
1993–2000	East Grinstead	-	-
2001–2005	Guildford	-	-
2007–2017	Chichester	-	-
National team
Years	Team	Caps	Goals
–	GB & England		-
Medal record
Men's field hockey
Representing England
European Championship
Bronze medal – third place	2003 Barcelona	Team

Jason Matthew Collins (born May 1977) is a British former field hockey player who played for GB and England.

== Biography ==
Collins was born in Worthing, England, and educated at Littlehampton Community School.

He was the captain of Horsham Colts and his Littlehampton School team and won a place on the Sussex representative junior squad in 1991. After a spell with Worthing Hockey Club he played club hockey for East Grinstead in the Men's England Hockey League from 1993.

Collins joined Guildford in 2001 and in October 2001 he was selected for his England debut during the international series against South Africa. Still at Guildford, Collins represented England at the 2002 Commonwealth Games in Manchester, where he helped England finish in fifth position.

After the 2005 season Collins retired from international hockey and later joined Chichester for the 2007/08 season as a player coach.
