= Southern Counties Hockey Association =

South Counties Hockey Association
- Sport: Field Hockey
- Jurisdiction: South of England
- Abbreviation: SCHA
- Affiliation: England Hockey

Southern Counties Hockey Association ran hockey leagues in the South and South East of England. The leagues fed teams into the Men's and Women's England Hockey Leagues and received teams from sub-regional (county) leagues.

England Hockey restructured regional hockey governing bodies in 2021. Leagues administered by the Southern Counties Hockey Association were split between South East Hockey and South Central Hockey. Sub-regional hockey associations were dissolved, with the new regional bodies administering all leagues below the England Hockey national leagues.

== League Structure ==
The male league was the South Hockey League and female is the South Clubs' Women's Hockey League. The men's system consisted of a Premier Division 1, a Premier Division 2, followed by regional and county divisions. The women's system consisted of a Division 1, followed by subsequent lower divisions and county divisions. The Southern Counties Hockey Association covered eight counties.

- Berkshire
- Buckinghamshire
- Hampshire
- Kent
- Middlesex
- Oxfordshire
- Surrey
- Sussex

== Champions ==
=== South Hockey League Premier Division 1 ===
Season	Champions	Runners Up
2000–01	Maidenhead	Wimbledon
2001–02	City of Portsmouth	Purley Walcountians
2002–03	Old Georgians	Beckenham
2003–04	Holcombe	Beckenham
2004–05	Oxted	Ashford
2005–06	Bromley & Beckenham	Brighton & Hove
2006–07	Sevenoaks	Ashford
2007–08	Fareham	Chichester
2008–09	Fareham	Chichester
2009–10	Wimbledon	Spencer
2010–11	Teddington	London Wayfarers
2011–12	Richmond	London Wayfarers
2012–13	Brighton & Hove	Oxford University
2013–14	Chichester	Sevenoaks
2014–15	Sevenoaks	Old Georgians
2014–15	Old Georgians	Havant
2016–17	Havant	Bromley & Beckenham
2017–18	Oxford Hawks	London Edwardians
2018–19	Old Cranleighans	Bromley & Beckenham
2019-20		

=== South Clubs' Women's Hockey League Division 1 ===
Season	Champions	Runners Up
2000–01		
2001–02	Wimbledon 1A	Epsom
2002–03	Wimbledon 1A	Epsom
2003–04	Wimbledon 1A	Southampton
2004–05	Horsham	Wimbledon
2005–06	Staines	Epsom
2006–07	Rover Oxford	Southgate
2007–08	Southgate	Epsom
2008–09	Buckingham	Southampton
2009–10	Surbiton	Reading 1A
2010–11	Oxford Hawks	Guildford
2011–12	Wimbledon	Maidenhead
2012–13	East Grinstead	Hampstead & Westminster
2013–14	Maidenhead	Hampstead & Westminster
2014–15	Hampstead & Westminster	Barnes
2015–16	Surbiton 2s	Southgate
2016–17	Barnes	Surbiton 2s
2017–18	Surbiton 2s	Horsham
2018–19	East Grinstead 2s	Guildford
2019-20		
