= Guildford Hockey Club =

British field hockey club

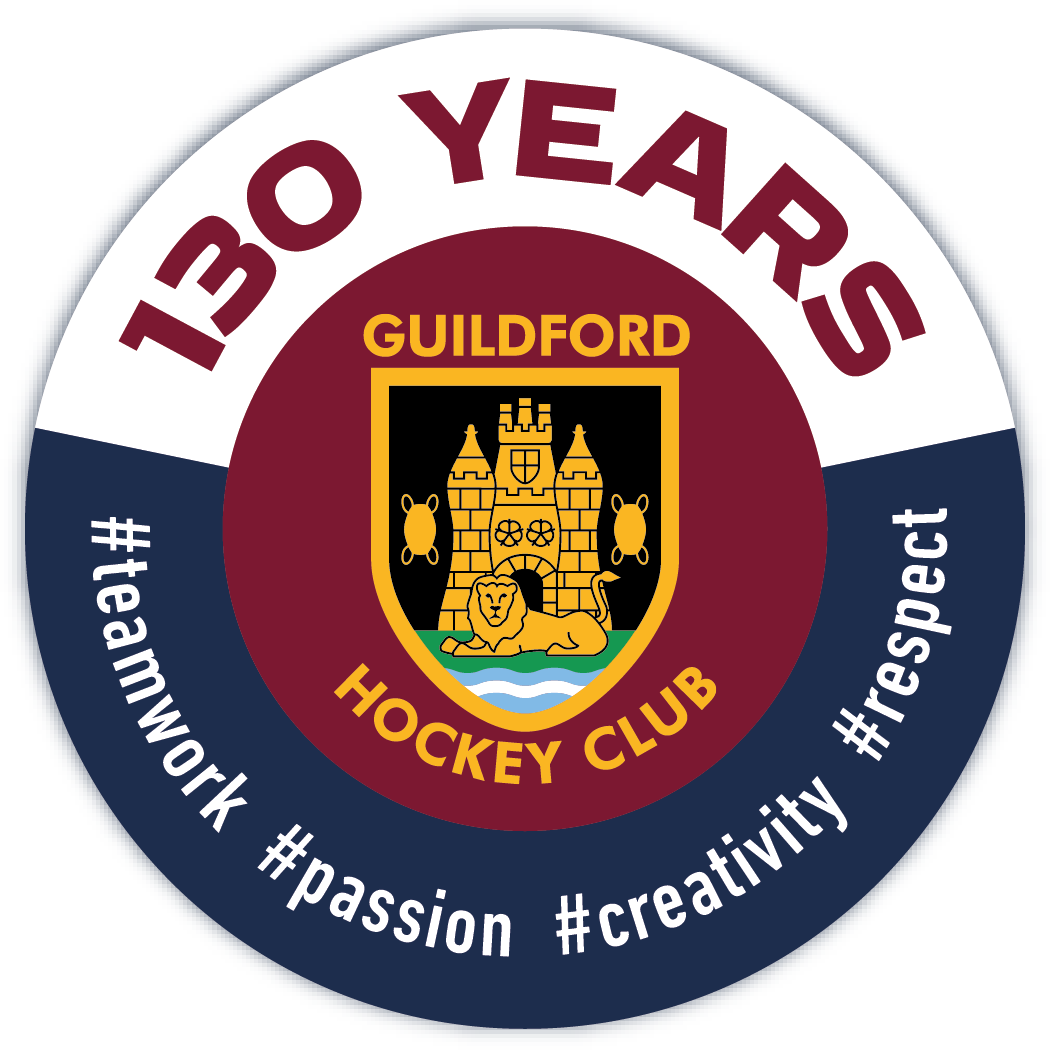
- Founded: 1896
- Home ground: Broadwater School also Charterhouse School and Prior's Field School and Surrey Sports Park

Personnel
- Coach: Dan Fox (field hockey)
- Website: https://guildfordhockeyclub.co.uk/

Guildford Hockey Club is a field hockey club based on the grounds of Broadwater School in Godalming, Surrey.

The club runs fourteen men's and eleven women's league teams for adults in the England Hockey league (Women's 1st and 2nd XI and Men's 1st XI) and South East Hockey league and London Hockey League (Masters Over 40s, 50s and 60s).

The club also enters teams into the England Hockey Championships and it runs training and league teams for more than 950 junior players ages 4 to 18. Further hockey programmes include Back to Hockey for those who have not played for a long time or who have never played before, Junior performance sessions, coaching in local schools, half-term and summer hockey camps for Juniors, and Flyerz disability hockey.

After winning both women's and men's South East Premier Divisions in 2021–22, the clubs first XIs played in Conference East of the women's and men's national league in 2022–23.

Both Men's and Women's 1st XI teams play in England Hockey Division 1 South. The Women's 1st XI won the Conference East league in 2022-23 earning promotion to Div 1 South, while the Men's 1st XI won the Conference West title and promotion to Men's England Hockey Division 1 South in the 2023–24 season.

The Women's 2nd XI won the South East Premier Division in 2023-24 and now play in the England Hockey Conference East division.

The club was established in 1896 and has secured many national honours throughout its history.

== National Honours ==
=== Men's ===
- 1977-78 Men's Cup Champions
- 1979-80 Men's Cup Runner-Up
- 1994-95 Men's Cup Champions
- 2000-01 Men's Cup Champions
- 2000-01 Men's Premiership Tournament Runner Up

=== Junior ===
- 2018-19 Boys' Under 18 Tier 1 Cup Winners
- 2021-22 Boys' Under 16 Tier 1 Cup Winners

=== Masters ===
- 2021-22 Women's Over 45 Tier 2 Cup Winners

== Notable players ==
=== Men's internationals ===
Extended content

Player	Events/Notes	Ref
(England) Jason Collins	CG (2002)	
(England) David Faulkner	GB & Eng debuts	
(England) Guy Fordham	Oly (2000, 2004), WC (2002)	
(England) Neil Francis	WC (1982), CT (1981), EC (1983)	
(England) Danny Hall	Oly (1996, 2000, 2004), CG (2002), WC (2002)	
(Wales) Mark Hoskin	CG (2002)	
(Wales) A Jeans		
(England) Ian Pinks		
(England) Roly Ward		

Key

- Oly = Olympic Games
- CG = Commonwealth Games
- WC = World Cup
- CT = Champions Trophy
- EC = European Championships
