= London Hockey League =

- Sport: Field Hockey
- Jurisdiction: London, South
- Abbreviation: (LHL)
- Affiliation date: 1969

Official website
- london.englandhockey.co.uk

The London Hockey League is a men's field hockey league based in Greater London. It was established in 1969. It feeds teams into the Men's England Hockey League and Women's England Hockey League.

== League structure ==
The men's and women's London Hockey league structure consists of a Premier Division that feeds into the National League, and then lower divisions. The league area covers Greater London.

The London Hockey League was previously known as the Higgins Group London Hockey League and was a separate entity from the England Hockey League. From the 2019–20 season 2XI teams from the previous season were permitted to feed into the Men's and Women's England Hockey Leagues.

A new league structure was launched in 2021. Currently the women's league has eight divisions and the men's league seven divisions. There are also Masters and Junior leagues.

== Recent Champions ==
Extended content

London Men's Premier Division

Season	Champions	Runners Up
2001–02	Surbiton M2s	
2002–03	Surbiton M2s	
2003–04	Surbiton M2s	
2004–05	Hampstead and Westminster M2s	
2005–06	Hampstead and Westminster M2s	
2006–07	Reading M2s	
2007–08	Hampstead and Westminster M2s	
2008–09	Surbiton M2s	
2009–10	Hampstead and Westminster M2s	
2010–11	Southgate M2s	
2011–12	Surbiton M2s	
2012–13	Hampstead and Westminster M2s	
2013–14	Hampstead and Westminster M2s	
2014–15	Southgate M2s	
2015–16	Hampstead and Westminster M2s	
2016–17	Hampstead and Westminster M2s	
2017–18	Hampstead and Westminster M2s	
2018–19	Southgate M2s	
2019–20		
2020–21	Cancelled due to COVID-19	
2021–22	Surbiton M2s	
2022–23	Wimbledon M2s	London Edwardians M1s
2023–24	West Herts M1s	Southgate M2s
2024–25	Southgate M2s	Epsom M1s
2025–26	Richmond M2s	Teddington M2s

London Women's Premier Division

Season	Champions	Runners Up
2021–22	Spencer W1s	
2022–23	London Wayfarers W2s	Teddington W1s
2023–24	Wapping W1s	Barnes W2s
2024–25	Barnes W2s	Southgate W2s
2025–26	Southgate W2s	East London W1s
