= Name blending =

Cultural naming practice

Name blending, meshing, or melding is the practice of combining two existing names to form a new name. It is most commonly performed upon marriage. According to Western tradition, the wife normally adopts the husband's surname upon marriage. Name blending is an alternative practice that attempts to assign equal cultural value to each partner's surname. In November 2012, it was reported that 800 couples in the United Kingdom had opted to blend their surnames thus far that year, primarily among "younger couples in their twenties or early thirties", with this being a leading reason for the issuance of Deed Polls to change names.

Since the early 2000s, it has also become common for celebrity couples to be given blended names in the media, usually made by combining elements of the given name of the people involved. This practice has been adopted by shippers within fandoms to describe relationships between fictional characters.

== Surname blending ==
Couples give many reasons for choosing to blend their surnames.

- Couples may choose to adopt a blended name to enter into marriage "with a completely new start without any history being tied to their surname". Name blending confers the same surname upon both spouses. This allows the family to conform to the expectation that the family (and any children) will all share the same name, and avoid confusion that can arise when spouses retain differing surnames.
- Name blending avoids the patriarchal practice of having the wife take the husband's name. In doing so, it is considered by many to be an extension of the feminist movement.
- Name blending avoids hyphenation and the complications associated with having a double-barreled surname or other form of combined name that may be too long for use in some circumstances (for example, many computer databases limit last names to 16 characters).
- Name blending avoids exponential growth in the length of surnames caused by successive double-barrelling.
- Name blending often creates a unique surname. With over 1 billion internet users, having a unique last name can make it easier for people to find an individual using search engines. It also increases the chance that the name will be available as a username in e-mail systems and online communities.
- Name blending allows a single surname to acknowledge the diverse background of the family.
- Name blending also provides an alternative for same-sex marriages, where there are not longstanding traditions regarding the taking of one participant's surname by the other.

Surname blending can also occur in multiple steps, as when a double-barrelled is combined and condensed in later generations.

== Names used to refer to celebrity couples ==
In the case of celebrity couples, where the names are chosen by the media (or arise from the public) rather than reflecting a choice by the couple, it has been suggested that the assignment of a nickname makes fans feel closer to the couple. The popularity of celebrity supercouple Ben Affleck and Jennifer Lopez from 2002 to 2004 and from 2021 to present (they broke up then rekindled their relationship over a decade later) resulted in their being known by the portmanteau "Bennifer" (for Ben and Jennifer) to the media, as well as to fans using the name combination. The term Bennifer itself became popular, and started the trend of other celebrity couples being referred to by the combination of each other's first names, as with Brad Pitt and Angelina Jolie ("Brangelina"), and Kanye West and Kim Kardashian ("Kimye"). Robert Thompson, director of the Centre for the Study of Popular Television, said "as silly as it sounds, this new tendency to make up single names for two people, like 'Bennifer' (Ben Affleck and Jennifer Lopez) and 'TomKat' (Tom Cruise and Katie Holmes), is an insightful idea'. 'Brangelina' has more cultural equity than their two star parts".

== Notable people with blended surnames ==
- Claire Daverley, novelist (from Davis and Moverley)
- Rose and Rosie Daughton, YouTube duo and married couple (from Dix and Spaughton)
- Clay Dreslough, game designer (from Dresser and McLoughlin)
- Dawn O'Porter, writer and presenter (from Porter and O'Dowd)
- Alexa PenaVega and Carlos PenaVega, actors (from her birth surname Vega and his birth surname Pena)
- Antonio Villaraigosa, former mayor of Los Angeles (from Villar and Raigosa)
- Zach Weinersmith, cartoonist, and Kelly Weinersmith, biologist (from Weiner and Smith)
