= John Land (field hockey) =

British field hockey player (1938–2021)

Personal information
- Born: 17 July 1938 Sunderland, England
- Died: 6 January 2021 (aged 82)
- Height: 170 cm (5 ft 7 in)
- Weight: 59 kg (130 lb)

Sport
- Sport: Field hockey
- Position: Inside forward
Senior career
Years	Team	Caps	Goals
1957–1959	Sunderland Ashbrooke	-	-
1959–1961	Nottingham University	-	-
1963–1965	Richmond	-	-
1967–1971	Sunderland	-	-
National team
Years	Team	Caps	Goals
–	Great Britain		-
–	England		-

John James Land (17 July 1938 – 6 January 2021) was a British field hockey player. Land was a member of the team that competed at the 1964 Summer Olympics. In later life he returned to hockey, playing for England at over 60s, over 65s, over 70s and over 75s level. Land supported the growth of the sport in the north of England and was president of the North Hockey Association in 2006.

== Biography ==
Land was born on 17 July 1938 to Magnus and Alice Land. His father, a Royal Navy sailor, was lost at sea and presumed drowned in 1939. As a child Land played a number of sports and was a member of his school's field hockey first eleven. He studied at the University of Nottingham, graduating with a degree in metallurgy in 1962. Land played field hockey for the university between 1959 and 1961, one of the most successful periods for the sport at the university, including a period as team captain.

Land played for the England and Great Britain field hockey teams in the 1960s. He was recognised as being exceptionally quick on the field. He competed in the men's tournament at the 1964 Summer Olympics. Land was from the north of England and at this time it was unusual for players from outside southern England to be selected for the team.

In later life Land returned to hockey, competing for England at Masters level. He won gold medals with the over 60s, over 65s and over 70s teams and also played for the over 75s. He worked with the North Hockey Association to promote masters hockey in the north of England. His support helped to establish North sides that compete at the over 60s, 65s and 70s levels (and have won gold in the latter two categories). He was president of the association in 2006. He also supported the LX Club and Sunderland hockey teams.

Land was married to Julie and had three children. He was diagnosed with motor neurone disease in 2015 and died on 6 January 2021.
