= Iqbal Singh Kullar =

British field hockey player

Personal information
- Born: 26 February 1954 (age 72) Sansarpur, India

Sport
- Sport: Field hockey
- Position: Midfield
Senior career
Years	Team	Caps	Goals
1979–1985	Beckenham	-	-
1985–1988	Worthing	-	-
National team
Years	Team	Caps	Goals
1979–1980	England	7	-
1980–1980	Great Britain	5	-

Iqbal Singh Kullar (born 26 February 1954) is a former hockey international player, who represented England and Great Britain. He was selected for the 1980 Summer Olympics.

== Biography ==
Kullar was born in Sansarpur, India but moved to England in 1964 aged 10, he studied at the University of London.

He played club hockey for Beckenham Hockey Club in the Men's England Hockey League and represented Kent at county level. While at Beckenham he made his England debut on 11 May 1979 against Czechoslovakia in Zagreb and his Great Britain debut on 4 January 1980 against the Netherlands in Karachi, during the Champions Trophy.

Kullar was named in the 22-strong squad for the Great Britain team for the 1980 Olympic Games in Moscow, but was unable to participate due to the boycott.

He left Beckenham for Worthing Hockey Club for the start of the 1985 season and became the club's player-coach.
