= East Region Hockey Association =

Organising body for field hockey in the East of England

East Hockey Association
- Sport: Field Hockey
- Jurisdiction: East
- Abbreviation: EHA
- Affiliation: England Hockey

Official website
- east.englandhockey.co.uk

The East Hockey Association is the organising body for field hockey in the East of England. It feeds teams into the Men's and Women's England Hockey Leagues and takes teams from sub-regional leagues.

== League structure ==
The men's and women's leagues both share a similar structure consisting of a Premier Division 1, with subsequent lower Premier divisions, followed by regional and sub-regional (county) divisions. Following a league restructure in 2021, The East Region Hockey Association was replaced by East Hockey and the catchment area was reduced to cover the following counties:

- Bedfordshire
- Cambridgeshire
- Essex
- Hertfordshire
- Lincolnshire (South only)
- Norfolk
- Suffolk

== Recent champions ==
Extended content

=== East Men's Premier Division ===
Season	Champions	Runners Up
1999–2000	Ipswich M1s	Crostyx M1s
2000–01	Blueharts M1s	Bishop's Stortford M1s
2001–02	Harleston Magpies M1s	Crostyx M1s
2002–03	Crostyx M1s	Bishop's Stortford M1s
2003–04	University of Cambridge M1s	Bedford Town M1s
2004–05	Ipswich M1s	Bedford Town M1s
2005–06	Blueharts M1s	Chelmsford M2s
2006–07	University of Cambridge M1s	Harleston Magpies M1s
2007–08	Harleston Magpies M1s	St Albans M1s
2008–09	Harleston Magpies M1s	University of Cambridge M1s
2009–10	St Albans M1s	University of Cambridge M1s
2010–11	City of Peterborough M1s	Cambridge City M1s
2011–12	Cambridge City M1s	West Herts M1s
2012–13	St Albans M1s	Bedford M1s
2013–14	West Herts M1s	Harleston Magpies M1s
2014–15	Harleston Magpies M1s	Wapping M1s
2015–16	Wapping M1s	City of Peterborough M1s
2016–17	Old Loughtonians M1s	St Albans M1s
2017–18	City of Peterborough M1s	St Albans M1s
2018–19	Wapping M1s	Harleston Magpies M1s
2019–20	West Herts M1s	University of Cambridge M1s
2020–21	Cancelled due to COVID-19	
2021–22		
2022–23	City of Peterborough M1s	Pelicans M1s
2023–24	Chelmsford M1s	Old Southendian M1s
2024–25	City of Peterborough M1s	Saffron Walden M1s
2025–26	Blueharts M1s	Ipswich M1s

=== East Women's Premier Division ===
Season	Champions	Runners Up
2000–01	Canterbury W2s	
2001–02		
2002–03	Letchworth W1s	Sevenoaks W1s
2003–04	Letchworth W1s	University of Cambridge W1s
2004–05	Maidstone W1s	Sevenoaks W1s
2005–06	Tunbridge Wells W1s	Crostyx W1s
2006–07	Cambridge City W1s	Sudbury W1s
2007–08	Holcombe W1s	Sudbury W1s
2008–09	Cambridge City W1s	Dereham W1s
2009–10	Dereham W1s	Canterbury W2s
2010–11	Maidstone W1s	Bromley & Beckenham W1s
2011–12	Bromley & Beckenham W1s	Bedford W1s
2012–13	Holcombe W1s	Bedford W1s
2013–14	Bedford W1s	Bromley & Beckenham W1s
2014–15	Cambridge City W1s	Bromley & Beckenham W1s
2015–16	West Herts W1s	Bedford W1s
2016-17	Bedford W1s	Ipswich W1s
2017–18	Ipswich W1s	Canterbury W2s
2018–19		
2019–20	East London W1s	Wapping W1s
2020–21	Cancelled due to COVID-19	
2021–22		
2022–23	Old Loughtonians W1s	University of Cambridge W1s
2023–24	University of Cambridge W1s	Cambridge City W2s
2024–25	Harleston Magpies W2s	Cambridge City W2s
2025–26	Bedford W1s	Broxbourne W1s
