= The Hertfordshire and Essex High School =

The Hertfordshire & Essex High School

Location
- Warwick Road; Bishop's Stortford, Hertfordshire, CM23 5NJ; England; 51°52′04″N 0°10′16″E

Information
- Type: Academy
- Motto: SIC ITUR AD ASTRA ("Reach for the Stars")
- Established: 1909
- Local authority: Hertfordshire
- Department for Education URN: 140786 Tables
- Ofsted: Reports
- Headteacher: Richard Paul
- Gender: Girls (Sixth Form is Co-educational)
- Age: 11 to 18
- Enrolment: 1500
- Houses: Astra (new 2014), Ford (historical now ceased), Castle, Forest, Lea, Seaxe, Hart
- Website: www.hertsandessex.herts.sch.uk

The Hertfordshire and Essex High School and since 2004 named as The Hertfordshire & Essex High School and Science College, commonly referred to as Herts and Essex, is a secondary level comprehensive single-sex school with a mixed-sex sixth form in Bishop's Stortford, Hertfordshire, England.

== History ==
It was opened as The Bishop's Stortford Secondary School for Girls in 1909, the school was built to have an intake of around 120 fee-paying students, at the time of opening it was run by both the counties of Hertfordshire and Essex and therefore, it later changed its name to the Hertfordshire and Essex Girls' High School. It then became a comprehensive in the 1970s when the school was renamed again to its current name, The Hertfordshire and Essex High School.

Following the outbreak of The Second World War in 1939, thousands of London children were evacuated to the countryside. Pupils from Clapton County Secondary School for Girls in Hackney, East London, were specifically sent here to be educated at this school. With few teachers and little space, local children were taught in the mornings and London children in the afternoons.

During its 100-year history, the school has changed significantly with many new buildings being added to the original Edwardian School House to allow for just under 10 times the number of students it had in 1910. Between 2000 and 2004, the school had a redevelopment which included new IT suites, refectory, sports facilities, dance studio and Sixth Form Common Room. The project involved the refurbishment of the Edwardian schoolhouse, plus a new build teaching block and sports facilities. The school converted to academy status in April 2014.

== Academics ==
"The Hertfordshire & Essex High School is an outstanding school with an outstanding sixth form"- Ofsted report 2009.

The school is for girls only between the ages of 11 and 16 and has a co-educational sixth form for boys and girls. From 2004, the school has had Science College Status. From 2008, the school has had 'Leadership partner school status'. The school was successful in its bid to become one of the first hundred Teaching Schools in the UK.

== Sixth Form ==
Unlike the rest of the school, boys are permitted to study within the Sixth Form.

In 2009 Ofsted stated that "The Hertfordshire and Essex High School is an outstanding school with an outstanding Sixth Form".

All students within the Sixth Form are required to take 4 Advanced Subsidiary levels and continue with three of these to the full Advanced Level in Year 13.

Until September 2010 there was no dress code for students within the Sixth Form, but this was changed to a dress code of businesswear (Suits).

Sixth Form facilities include a large common room and 5 computer and study rooms for students to use in their study periods and during lunch and break.

== Sports Centre ==
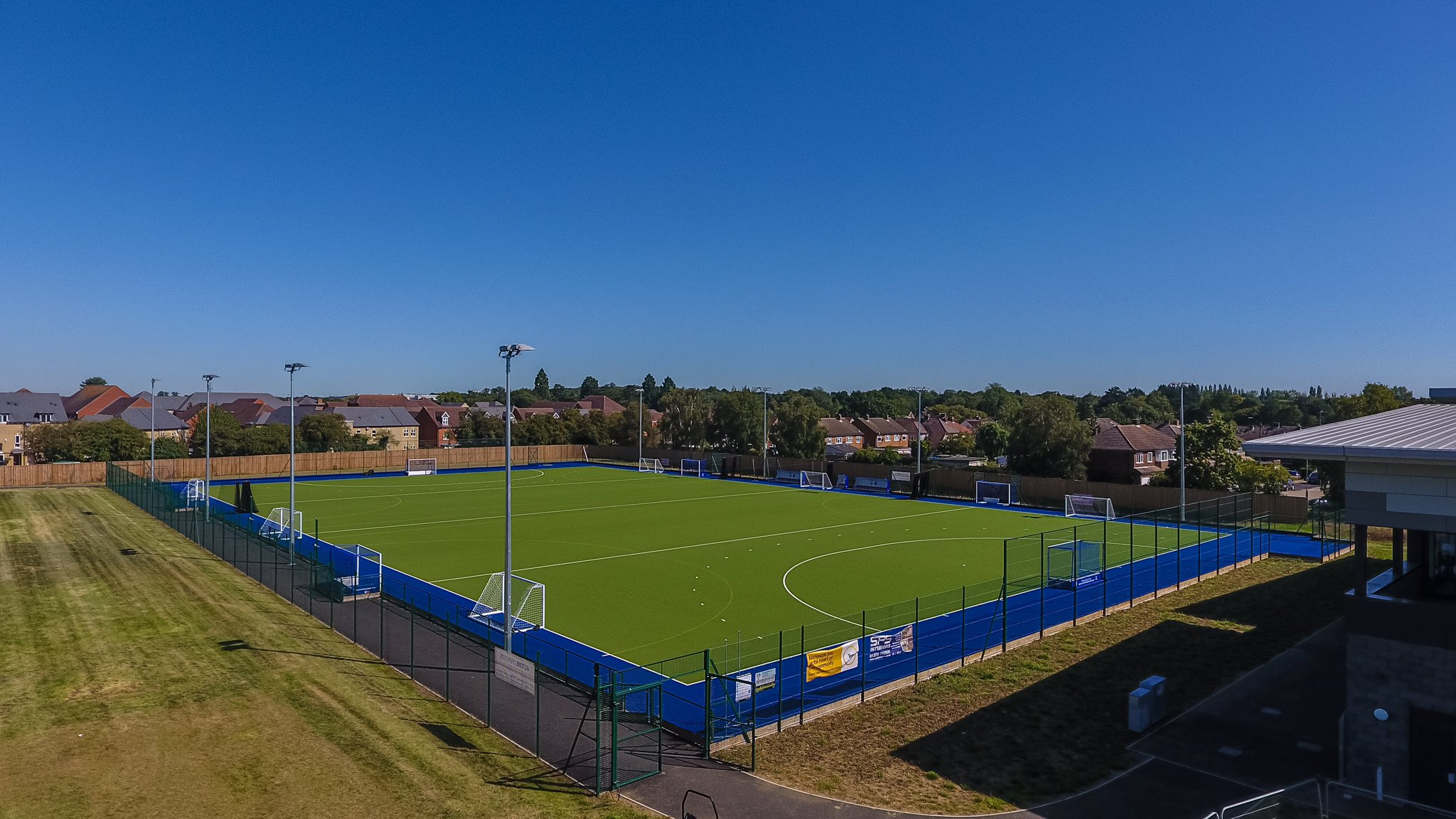
Bishop's Stortford Hockey Club pitch

Herts & Essex Sports Centre opened on Friday 20 September 2019. The project has been a collaborative one with funding coming from a variety of bodies and institutions including the Department for Education, Hertfordshire County Council, East Herts District Council, Sport England, Bishop's Stortford Hockey Club, Bishop's Stortford Judo Club as well as staff, students, parents, friends and families who donated via the school's "The Final Hurdle Campaign".

The facility includes:

- 4 court badminton sports hall
- Dojo
- Sand-dressed 2G all weather pitch with floodlighting
- 6 tennis/netball courts with floodlighting
- Dance studio

== Notable former pupils ==
- Liam Byrne, Labour MP - 1986-88 (sixth form pupil)
- Claire Daverley, novelist
- Natasha Devon, social campaigner - 1992-99
- Helen King, Principal of St Anne's College, Oxford and former senior police officer - 1976-83
- Sarah Ockwell-Smith, childcare author - 1987-92
- Caroline Spelman, Conservative MP - 1969-76 (before it was comprehensive)
- Surie, formerly known as Susanna Cork, Singer-Songwriter and represented the United Kingdom at Eurovision in 2018 Lisbon - 2000-05
