= Stuart Morris (field hockey) =

British hockey player

Personal information
- Born: 7 December 1940 (age 85) Somerset, England

Sport
- Sport: Field hockey
- Position: Inside right
Senior career
| Years | Team | Caps | Goals |
| 1964–1965 | Marlborough | - | - |
| 1966–1971 | Richmond | - | - |
National team
| Years | Team | Caps | Goals |
| – | Great Britain | | - |
| – | England | | - |

James Stuart Millner Morris (born 7 December 1940) is a British former field hockey player who competed at the 1968 Summer Olympics.

== Biography ==
Morris studied at Cambridge University and gained a blue. He played club hockey for Marlborough Hockey Club and represented Wiltshire at county level.

He joined Richmond Hockey Club and was called up to represent England at international level. Morris was the hockey teacher at Great Horwood School in Stowe at the time of his Olympic selection.

Morris represented Great Britain at the 1968 Olympic Games in Mexico City in the men's tournament.
