= Percy Rees =

Field hockey player

Personal information
- Born: 27 September 1883 Camberwell, England
- Died: 12 June 1970 (aged 86) Wonersh, England

Sport
- Sport: Field hockey
- Position: Outside-right
Senior career
Years	Team	Caps	Goals
1904–1912	Barnes	-	-
National team
Years	Team	Caps	Goals
1906–1908	England	14	-
Medal record
Men's field hockey
Representing Great Britain
Gold medal – first place	1908 London	Team competition

Percy Montague Rees (September 27, 1883 — June 12, 1970), was a field hockey player, who won a gold medal with the England team at the 1908 Summer Olympics in London.

== Biography ==
Rees was educated at Dulwich College. He played club hockey for Barnes Hockey Club and the South at representative level. By trade he was an accountant, qualifying in 1905.

In 1906, Rees made his first appearance for the England national field hockey team against Wales and played Ireland and Scotland in the same year. In 1908 Rees was selected to play for the South vs Midlands and later the North. He was then selected to play for England vs. Wales, Ireland and Scotland and also played against France. He was part of the Olympic squad that won the gold medal for England in 1908.

Rees won the Military Cross during World War I while serving with the Royal Fusiliers (10th Battalion). After finishing his playing career he was the chief accountant at Unilever until 1948.
