= Alan Page (field hockey) =

British field hockey player (born 1937)

Personal information
- Born: 28 May 1937 (age 89)
- Height: 172 cm (5 ft 8 in)
- Weight: 67 kg (148 lb)

Sport
- Sport: Field hockey
Senior career
Years	Team	Caps	Goals
1959–1970	Beckenham	-	-
National team
Years	Team	Caps	Goals
–	Great Britain		-
–	England		-

Alan Graham Page (born 28 May 1937) is a British field hockey player. He competed in the men's tournament at the 1964 Summer Olympics.

== Biography ==
Page played club hockey for Beckenham Hockey Club and Kent at county level.

He represented Great Britain at the 1964 Olympic Games in Tokyo.
