= Basil Christensen =

British field hockey player

Personal information
- Born: 9 June 1938 India
- Died: 13 May 2005 (aged 66) Winchester, England
- Height: 172 cm (5 ft 8 in)
- Weight: 65 kg (143 lb)

Sport
- Sport: Field hockey
- Position: Forward
Senior career
Years	Team	Caps	Goals
1960–1972	Beckenham	-	-
National team
Years	Team	Caps	Goals
–	Great Britain		-
–	England		-

Basil Christensen (9 June 1938 – 13 May 2005) was a British field hockey player who competed at the 1968 Summer Olympics.

== Biography ==
Christensen played club hockey for Beckenham Hockey Club.

Christensen represented Great Britain at the 1968 Olympic Games in Mexico City in the men's tournament.
