= Chris Rule (field hockey) =

British field hockey player (born 1957)

Personal information
- Born: October 1957 (age 68)

Sport
- Sport: Field hockey
- Position: Winger/Forward
Senior career
Years	Team	Caps	Goals
1977–1988	Beckenham	-	-
1988–1989	East Grinstead	-	-
National team
Years	Team	Caps	Goals
–	England & Great Britain		-

Christopher John Rule (born October 1957) is a former British hockey international.

== Biography ==
Rule was educated at Langley Park School for Boys and played club hockey for Beckenham Hockey Club in the Men's England Hockey League, and he would later become the club captain.

Rule played for England schoolboys in 1976. He also played for Kent at county level and played as a winger/forward for England.

While at Beckenham he was selected by England for the 1981 Men's Hockey Champions Trophy and for the 1982 Men's Hockey World Cup in Bombay.

Rule left Beckenham to play for East Grinstead Hockey Club in the new National League in 1988.

He was still playing hockey for Surrey at over-60 level in 2024 and England masters at over-65 level. He is the owner of Kingfisher Financial Consultancy Ltd.
