= Daniel Fox (field hockey) =

English field hockey player

Dan Fox
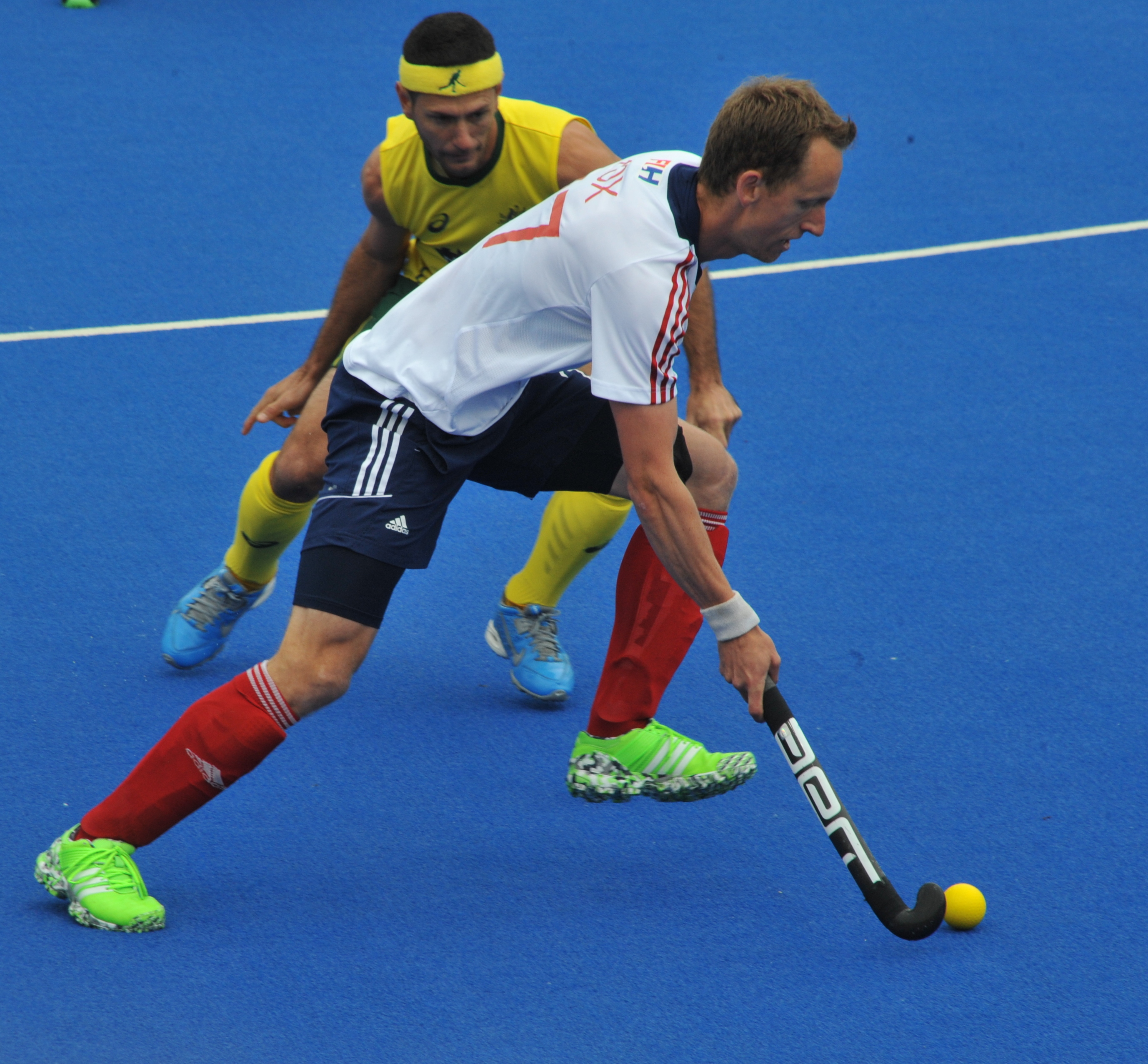
- Great Britain v Australia 13 June 2015

Personal information
- Born: 3 March 1983 (age 43) Birmingham, West Midlands, England
- Height: 1.83 m (6 ft 0 in)
- Weight: 78 kg (172 lb)

Sport
- Sport: Field hockey
Senior career
Years	Team	Caps	Goals
2009–2013	Hampstead & Westminster	-	-
2013–2018	Holcombe	-	-
2018–2019	Old Georgians	-	-
2019–2025	Guildford	-	-
Medal record
Men's field hockey
Representing England
Champions Trophy
Silver medal – second place	2010 Mönchengladbach	Team
Commonwealth Games
Bronze medal – third place	2014 Glasgow	Team
World League
Bronze medal – third place	2014 New Delhi	Team

Daniel Richard Fox (born 3 March 1983) is an English international field hockey player who played as a defender for England and Great Britain until 2016. He competed at the 2016 Summer Olympics.

== Biography ==
Fox was educated at King Edward VI Five Ways School and St Edmund Hall, Oxford, where he played first-class cricket for Oxford University Cricket Club.

Fox played club hockey for Hampstead & Westminster in the Men's England Hockey League and made his international debut in 2009 and was part of the silver medal winning England team that competed at the 2010 Men's Hockey Champions Trophy in Mönchengladbach, Germany.

He competed for Great Britain at the London 2012 Olympics.

He became his club captain but the season after the Olympics in 2013, Fox left Hampstead to play for Holcombe and became their vice-captain.

While at Holcombe he represented England in the 2014 Commonwealth Games in Glasgow, where he won a bronze medal and represented Great Britain at the 2016 Olympic Games in Rio de Janeiro. At the end of 2016, Fox announced his international retirement.

After a season with Old Georgians he joined Guildford in 2019, where he became the Director of Hockey.

== See also ==
- List of Oxford University Cricket Club players
