= Robert Fison =

British field hockey player and coach

Personal information
- Born: 9 March 1908 Chorlton-cum-Hardy, England
- Died: 3 August 1972 (aged 64) Reigate, England

Sport
- Sport: Field hockey
Senior career
Years	Team	Caps	Goals
1927–1929	Cambridge University	-	-
1930–1931	Cambridge Wanderers	-	-
1931–1938	Beckenham	-	-
National team
Years	Team	Caps	Goals
1932–1934	England	15	-
Medal record
Men's field hockey
Representing Great Britain
Bronze medal – third place	1952 Helsinki	Team competition

Robert Young Fison (9 March 1908 – 3 August 1972) was a British field hockey player and manager. He managed the Great Britain team to their bronze medal success at the 1952 Summer Olympics.

== Biography ==
Fison was educated at Marlborough College and studied at Clare College, Cambridge. While at University he played for the Cambridge University Hockey Club and won double blue in 1927 and 1928.

After leaving Cambridge he played for the University alumni team known as the Cambridge University Wanderers and then Beckenham Hockey Club.

He represented Surrey and the East of England and won 15 caps for England between 1932 and 1934.

After his retirement from playing, he became a hockey manager and administrator was instrumental in helping Great Britain win the bronze medal at the 1952 Olympic Games in Helsinki. He later became president of the Southern Counties Hockey Association and vice-president of the Reigate Hockey Club. From 1966 until 1972 he was president of the Hockey Association. By trade Fison was the managing director of Meredith and Drew biscuit manufacturers and was awarded a CBE in 1967.
