= Harleston Magpies Hockey Club =

British field hockey club

- Founded: 1935; 90 years ago
- Ground: Weybread, Diss, Suffolk, IP21 5UF
- League: Women's England Hockey League; East Region Hockey Association
Home colours

Harleston Magpies is a field hockey club based near the town of Harleston. It was established in 1935. The club's home ground is at Shotford Heath, just south of the Norfolk market town of Harleston. The club boasts two AstroTurf pitches – one water-based and the other sand-based, with a clubhouse and large car park for members and visitors. The ladies 1st team play in the Women's England Hockey League. The ladies 2nd team play in East Region Hockey Association League. Other ladies sides play in the Empressa Norfolk Women's Hockey League. Men's teams also play in the East Region Hockey Association League. The club also fields development, youth, veterans, mixed and indoor teams.

== Formative years ==
Founded in 1935, Harleston Magpies is one of the oldest clubs in the East Region. It was named after the Harleston Magpie public house in the town of Harleston, now the JD Young Hotel.

== Information about the club ==
Harleston Magpies was formed in 1935 and named after the well-known public house which hosted the inaugural meeting. A separate ladies club was formed in 1954 with a successful merger following in 1974. Two years later the present clubhouse was built – and later extended – and in 1982 the club bought the freehold of most of its grounds.

Over the years the club has continued to improve its facilities and in 1990 put down a sand-based artificial grass pitch, which was re-carpeted in 2006, and in 2002 put down a water-based artificial grass pitch. In the summer of 2007 the club's floodlights were upgraded, the clubhouse balcony replaced and a disabled toilet and stairlift installed. These developments would not have been possible without the invaluable help of Mid Suffolk DC, South Norfolk DC, Sport England, the Foundation for Sport and the Arts and many club members, sponsors and supporters.

The club, which is renowned for its friendly family atmosphere, has developed a large and active youth section drawn from the local community due in no small part to the decision in 1995 to appoint a Youth Development Officer to promote hockey at the club and in the community.

The club aims to instill a lifelong interest in the game in its members, has been one of the most consistently successful in East Anglia over the last twenty years (despite the inevitable ups and downs) and seeks to serve the local community, placing great emphasis on its youth development programme, by providing hockey for men, women, boys and girls – of all ages and abilities.

In 2007 the club was awarded Clubs 1st status by England Hockey. Clubs 1st is part of Sport England Clubmark – a nationally recognised accreditation for sports clubs.

The club aims to ensure that as many people as possible within the community who might wish to join the club are made aware of its activities through, mainly, the local press and radio, the club's excellent website, the Harleston Grapevine magazine and the notice board near the Harleston Post Office.

Notable events in the past 40 years of the club have included –

- Built (and later extended) its clubhouse in 1976
- Bought its own ground in 1982
- Put down a sand-based artificial grass pitch in 1990
- Put down a water-based pitch in 2002
- Re-carpeted the sand-based pitch in 2006

== Location ==
The clubhouse and pitches are based at Shotford Heath, between Harleston and Weybread. Although Magpies are registered as Norfolk hockey club, they actually play in Suffolk, the River Waveney marking the boundary between the counties. Directions to the clubhouse are here.

== Teams ==
The table below shows teams entered into leagues in the 2014/2015 season, with their league title and final position.

Men's	League for 2014/2015 season	Final position	Ladies	League for 2014/2015	Final position
1st XI	East Premier A	1st – Promoted	1st XI	Investec Women's Hockey League Conference East	3rd
2nd XI	East Premier B	10th	2nd XI	East Premier	6th
3rd XI	East Division 3NE	7th	3rd XI	Empresa Norfolk Women's Hockey League Premier Division	3rd
4th XI	East Division 3NE	11th – relegated	4th XI	Empresa Norfolk Women's Hockey League Premier Division	7th
5th XI	East Division 5NE	5th	5th XI	Empresa Norfolk Women's Hockey League Division 1	4th
6th XI	East Division 5NE	11th – relegated	6th XI	Empresa Norfolk Women's Hockey League Division 1	12th – relegated
N/A	N/A	N/A	7th XI	Empresa Norfolk Women's Hockey League Division 3	5th
Boys Development	Boys Development League	1st	Girls Development	Girls Development League	2nd

=== Men's 1st XI 2014/2015 ===
Captain – Mark Wheelhouse
Vice Captain – Leigh Sitch
Coach – Ben Wright
Manager – Steve Leate

=== Men's 2nd XI 2014/2015 ===
Captain – Dickon Taylor
Vice Captain – Robbie Kinsella

=== Ladies 1st XI 2014/2015 ===
Captain – Lucy Belsey
Vice Captain – Debbie Francis
Manager – Nick McAllen
Coach – Clyde Camburn
Assistant Coach – Susan Wessells

==== Ladies' 1st XI squad for 2014/2014 season ====
Note: Flags indicate national team as defined under FIFA eligibility rules; some limited exceptions apply. Players may hold more than one non-FIFA nationality.

No.	Pos.	Nation	Player
1	GK	ENG	Megan Adams
2	DF	ENG	Maria Andrews
3	DF	ENG	Lauren Barber
4	DF	ENG	Lucy Belsey (captain)
5	FW	ENG	Amy Campbell
6	GK	ENG	Calianne Clark
7	MF	ENG	Elizabeth Clymer
8	MF	ENG	Debbie Francis (vice captain)
9	FW	ENG	Abby Gooderham
10	DF	ENG	Louisa Greenacre
11	DF	ENG	Charlotte Harrison
12	DF	ENG	Kath Johnson
13	GK	ENG	Lucy King
15	GK	ENG	Charlotte Lee-Smith

No.	Pos.	Nation	Player
16	FW	ENG	Emma Lee-Smith
17	DF	ENG	Melissa Ludlam
18	FW	ENG	Bryony Lund
19	DF	ENG	Lauren Mickleburgh
20	MF	ENG	Georgina Minta
21	DF	ENG	Katie Ogden
22	DF	ENG	Katrina Sitch
23	GK	ENG	Kristina Smyth
24	FW	ENG	Anouska Stott
25	DF	ENG	Amy Tuffs
27	FW	RSA	Susan Wessels
28	FW	ENG	Angie Wheelhouse
29	MF	ENG	Lucy Whiting
30	DF	ENG	Kira Wooltorton

Based on data from England Hockey team specs. Positions and numbers to be confirmed.

=== Ladies 2nd XI 2014/2015 ===
Captain – Samantha Tea

== International players ==
- Gareth Furlong, 2024 Olympics
