= Neil Milward Forster =

British field hockey player (1927–2006)

Neil Forster
Personal information
- Born: 29 May 1927 Brentford, England
- Died: 8 November 2006 (aged 79)

Sport
- Sport: Field hockey
Senior career
Years	Team	Caps	Goals
1953–1958	Richmond	-	-
National team
Years	Team	Caps	Goals
–	Great Britain		-
–	England		-

Neil Milward Forster (29 May 1927 – 2006) was a British field hockey player who competed in the 1956 Summer Olympics. and was the chairman of B&C Holdings.

== Early life ==
Forster was born in 1927. He is a graduate and former head of Hurstpierpoint College. Forster spent time in the Navy's national service. Upon leaving the Navy, Forster studied economics and law at Pembroke College, Cambridge where he played tennis, cricket and rugby. While playing rugby each year, Forster got a Blue for Cambridge. Forster eventually joined Cayzer subsidiary Clan Line at the age of 25.

== Olympics ==
Forster represented Great Britain in the field hockey tournament at the 1956 Olympic Games in Melbourne in which Great Britain finished in 4th place.

== Post olympics ==
In 1963, Forster was sent to India at the age of 36 to become a liner conference chairman. In 1967, Forster returned to England where he eventually became the director and then chairman of B&C Holdings.

== Personal life ==
In 1954, Forster married Barbara Smith and had three children with her. Forster died on November 8, 2006.
