= Wapping Hockey Club =

Hockey club

- Nickname(s): Wapping HC
- League: Men's England Hockey League East Region Hockey Association
- Home ground: Lee Valley Hockey and Tennis Centre; London, England (Capacity 3,000)

Personnel
- Chairman: Helen Rogers
- Website: www.wappinghockey.club
Home	Away

Wapping Hockey Club (/ˈwɒpɪŋ/) is a field hockey club in the East End of London in the London Borough of Tower Hamlets. The home grounds are the national stadium for English Hockey, the Lee Valley Hockey and Tennis Centre at the Queen Elizabeth Olympic Park, where there are two international standard water-based pitches and the John Orwell Centre in Wapping. The club fields a total of 23 sides including 11 men's and 8 ladies' sides covering a wide range of abilities.

== Olympic Legacy ==
The club was founded in 1988 off the back of the Great Britain men's field hockey team's success at the Seoul Olympics of the same year. The club secured anchor tenancy at the London 2012 legacy facility following its opening as Lee Valley Hockey and Tennis Centre in June 2014. The facility hosted the 2015 EuroHockey Nations Championships. In 2014, the club secured over £300,000 of investment to designate its base at John Orwell Sports Centre in Wapping a hockey priority facility. By 2016, approximately £650,000 had been invested in the refurbishment, meaning among other things, both Wapping HC grounds have covered spectator seating. The refurbishment allowed the creation of an affiliated youth club, Wapping Kidds HC, in January 2016. In September 2019, the first youth players made their debut in the adult club.
