= Brighton & Hove Hockey Club =

Field hockey club based in Brighton and Hove, England

- Full name: Brighton & Hove Hockey Club
- League: Men's England Hockey League; Women's South League
- Founded: 1897
- Colors: Home strip: Shirts - Dark blue with red accents. Shorts / Skorts - dark blue. Socks - Red
- Home ground: Blatchington Mill

Personnel
- Chairman: Cameron Heath (President is Stewart Newton)
- Website: brightonandhovehockeyclub.net

Brighton & Hove Hockey Club is a field hockey club based in Brighton and Hove, England and is one of the biggest sports clubs in Sussex. The home ground is located at Blatchington Mill School and Sixth Form College, Hove.

The club has 10 men's sides, 8 women's sides, and various other sides. The men's 1st XI play in the England Hockey League after gaining promotion to the national league for the first time in 2013. The women's 1st XI play in the South League.

The club has two all weather pitches at Blatchington Mill that were built in 2012, as well as use of the Nevill Pavilion.

== Honours ==
=== Adult honours ===
- 2012–13 Men's 1XI South Premier Division 1 champions

=== Junior honours ===
- 2024 Boys U16A EH Tier 2 Plate winners
- 2022 Girls Cormorants U16 EH Tier 1 Plate winners

== International players ==
Extended content

Player	Events	Notes/Ref
(Czech Republic) Barbora Kavanova		
(Wales) Joe Naughalty	2017–2018 & 2021–2024	
(Mexico) Alberto Martinez		
(Mexico) Juan Sosa		

Key

- Oly = Olympic Games
- CG = Commonwealth Games
- WC = World Cup
- CT = Champions Trophy
- EC = European Championships
