= Spencer Hockey Club =

English field hockey team

- Full name: Spencer Hockey Club
- Home ground: The Spencer Club, Earlsfield, Wandsworth
- Website: spencerhockeyclub.com

Spencer Hockey Club is a field hockey club based in Wandsworth, London. The club plays at The Spencer Club in Earlsfield.

The club is one of the largest clubs in London with 12 men's teams, 9 women's teams, a junior section and mixed and veterans teams. The men's 1st XI play in the Men's England Hockey League, the women's 1st XI play in the Women's England Hockey League, and the remaining teams compete in the London Hockey League.

== Honours ==
=== Adult honours ===
- 2021–22 Women's 1XI London Premier Division 1 - champions
- 2019–20 Men's 1XI South Premier Division 1 - 3rd place promotion

== Notable players ==
=== Men's internationals ===
Extended content

Player	Events/Notes	Ref

Key

- Oly = Olympic Games
- CG = Commonwealth Games
- WC = World Cup
- CT = Champions Trophy
- EC = European Championship
