= Claire Daverley =

English novelist

- Born: Claire Louise Davis; July 1991 (age 35)
- Education: Lady Margaret Hall, Oxford
- Years active: 2022–present
- Website: www.clairedaverley.com

Claire Louise Daverley (née Davis; born July 1991) is an English novelist. Her debut romance novel Talking at Night (2023) was shortlisted for a British Book Award among other accolades.

== Early life ==
Daverley grew up in Bishop's Stortford. She attended Summercroft Primary School and then Hertfordshire and Essex High School. She graduated from Lady Margaret Hall, Oxford with a degree in Fine Art.

== Career ==
Daverley began her career in publishing and digital marketing. She would write on the weekends and apply to agents. She was signed upon submitting the first 50 pages of what would become her debut novel.

Via a two-book deal in 2022, Penguin Michael Joseph (PMJ) acquired the rights to publish Daverley's debut novel Talking at Night in 2023. The romantic coming-of-age drama follows the characters Will and Rosie and drew comparisons to One Day and Normal People. Daverley said she "was interested in the idea of 'the one that got away' – but what if they never actually got away? What if they remained close, in your heart and mind and even physically in your life? So I started with that question and just kept writing". Talking at Night was shortlisted for Debut of the Year at the British Book Awards and the Nota Bene Prize. It was also selected for Fearne Cotton's Happy Place Book Club and Festival as well as the Grazia Book Club.

Daverley's second novel People in Love followed in 2026. People in Love was a Grazia Book Club pick.

== Bibliography ==
- Talking at Night (2023)
- People in Love (2026)

== Accolades ==
Year	Award	Category	Title	Result	Ref.
2023	British Book Awards	Debut of the Year	Talking at Night	Shortlisted	
2024	Nota Bene Prize		Talking at Night	Shortlisted	
