= Field hockey in Great Britain =

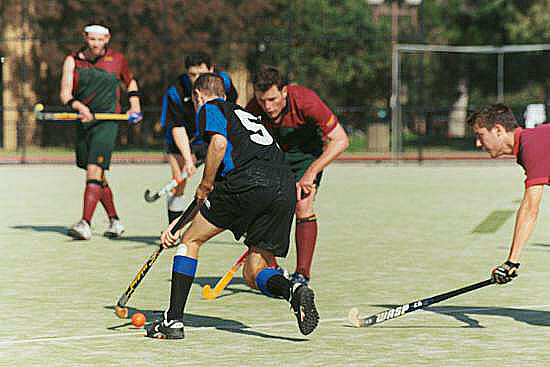
- A game of field hockey in progress
- Governing body: Great Britain Hockey
- Nickname: GB Hockey
- First played: Early/mid 1800s.
- Registered players: Estimate 32,000
- Clubs: 1145 (~1050 English ~60 Scottish ~35 Welsh)

National competitions
- Great Britain Super League (defunct)

Field hockey in Great Britain is governed by Great Britain Hockey. The organisation focuses on international competition only.

== Governance ==
GB Hockey administers the national men's and women's hockey teams for Great Britain during competition such as the Olympic Games, Hockey World Cup and other international events.

Domestic competitions are organised on the home nation basis by England Hockey, Scottish Hockey, and Hockey Wales.

== National teams ==
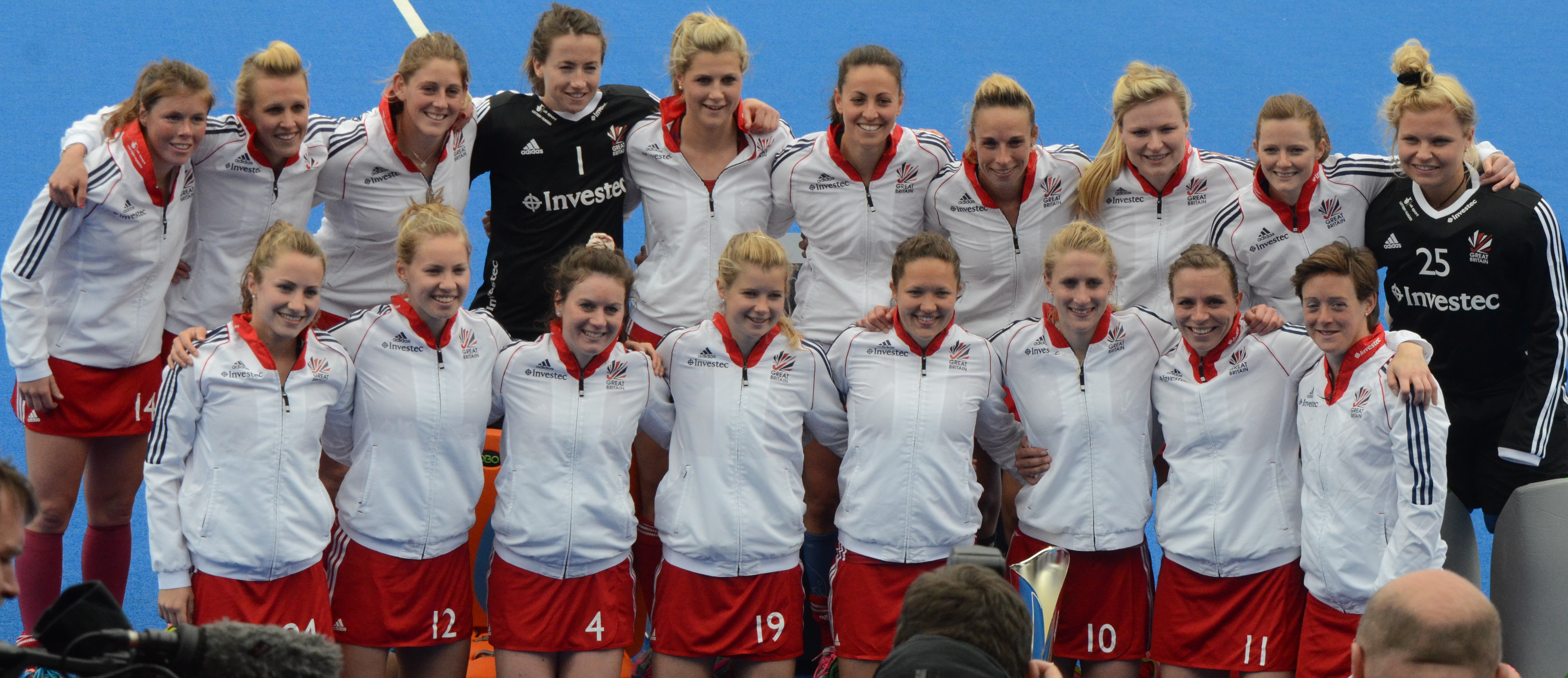
Great Britain's women's team in 2015, who'd later win Gold at the 2016 Summer Olympics.

Great Britain (Note: Competitions: Field hockey at the Summer Olympics, Hockey Champions Trophy, Men's FIH Pro League, Women's FIH Pro League.)

- Great Britain men's national field hockey team
- Great Britain women's national field hockey team

Home nations (Note: Competitions: Men's FIH Hockey World Cup, Women's FIH Hockey World Cup, EuroHockey Nations Championship, Women's EuroHockey Nations Championship, Hockey at the Commonwealth Games.)

- England men's national field hockey team
- England women's national field hockey team
- Scotland men's national field hockey team
- Scotland women's national field hockey team
- Wales men's national field hockey team
- Wales women's national field hockey team

== Domestic competitions ==
=== Great Britain Super League ===
The Great Britain Super League was established by Great Britain Hockey in 2007 as a showcase for British hockey talent. The event was shortlived running from 2007 until 2012 and is now defunct. The inaugural teams were from England (Wessex Leopards, Saxon Tigers and Pennine Pumas), Scotland (Caledonian Cougars and Highland Jaguars) and Wales (Celtic Panthers) competing. Players from the national leagues represented their relevant region.

==== Winners ====
Men's

Season	Champions	Runners Up
2006–07	Wessex Leopards	Saxon Tigers
2007-08	Saxon Tigers	Pennine Pumas
2008-09	Wessex Leopards	Pennine Pumas
2009-10	Pennine Pumas	Saxon Tigers
2010-11	Pennine Pumas	Saxon Tigers
2011-12	Pennine Pumas	Saxon Tigers

Women's

Season	Champions	Runners Up
2006–07	Wessex Leopards	Saxon Tigers
2007-08	Saxon Tigers	Pennine Pumas
2008-09	Pennine Pumas	Saxon Tigers
2009-10	no competition	
2010-11	Saxon Tigers	Caledonian Cougars
2011-12	Saxon Tigers	Pennine Pumas

== Tournaments hosted ==
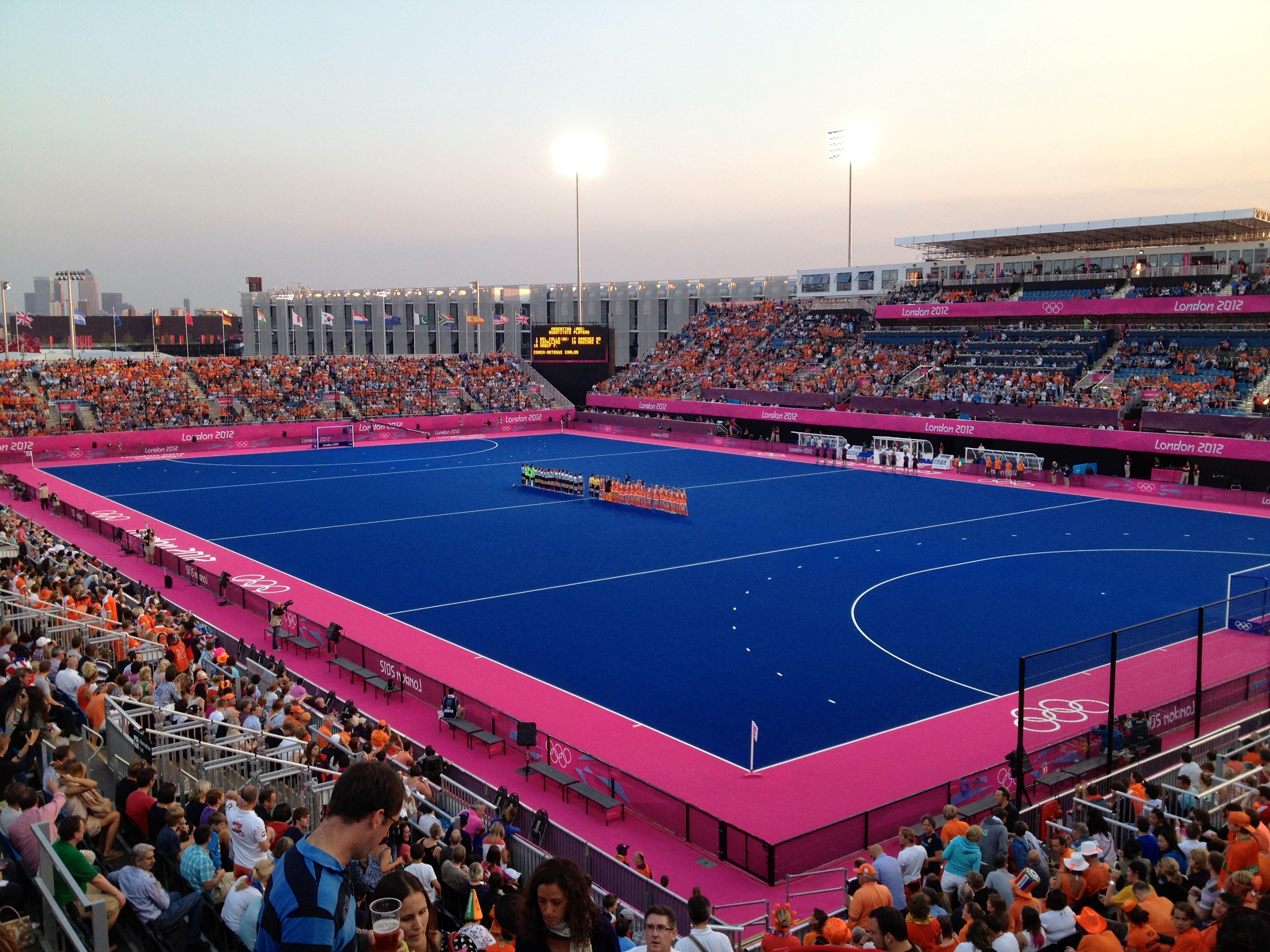
Pre match during the women's final at the 2012 Summer Olympics hosted in London

Competition	Year	Host city
Field hockey at the Summer Olympics	1908 M	(United Kingdom) London
Field hockey at the Summer Olympics	1948 M	(United Kingdom) London
Men's FIH Hockey World Cup	1986	(England) London
EuroHockey Nations Championship	1987 W	(England) London
Hockey at the Commonwealth Games	2002 M 2002 W	(England) Manchester
EuroHockey Nations Championship	2007 M 2007 W	(England) Manchester
Field hockey at the Summer Olympics	2012 M 2012 W	(United Kingdom) London
Hockey at the Commonwealth Games	2014 M 2014 W	(Scotland) Glasgow
EuroHockey Nations Championship	2015 M 2015 W	(England) London
Hockey Champions Trophy	2016 M 2016 W	(United Kingdom) London
Women's FIH Hockey World Cup	2018	(England) London
Hockey at the Commonwealth Games	2022 M 2022 W	(England) Birmingham

== See also ==
- Field hockey in England
- Field hockey in Scotland
- Field hockey in Wales
- Field hockey in Ireland (all-Ireland)
