= Barnes Hockey Club =

English field hockey team

- Full name: Barnes Hockey Club
- Founded: 1899
- Home ground: Duke's Meadow, Chiswick

Barnes Hockey Club is a field hockey club based at Duke's Meadows, Chiswick, West London and was formed in 1889. The women's first XI play in the Women's England Hockey League (the second highest league in England). The men's first XI play in the London Premier Division.

== Teams ==
The club has both men's and women's sections, with six teams for men and seven for women in addition to having a junior section and mixed team.

== History ==
Barnes Hockey Club was founded in 1889 but was forced to close during World War I. In 1919, the club was reformed as a part of Barnes Sports Club.

In 2005, Barnes Hockey Club merged with the women's section of Hounslow Hockey Club. Hounslow then went out of existence because the men's section joined Richmond Hockey Club.

Following the merger the team was known as the Barnes Hounslow and Ealing Hockey Club and in 2019, it changed its name to Hounslow and Barnes Hockey Club and facilities at Duke's Meadow underwent significant improvement.

=== Women's 2025–2026 squad ===
- 1. Millie Dodd (goalkeeper)
- 2. Lydia Thacker
- 3. Isabella da Rocha
- 4. Aleesa Ferguson (captain)
- 5. Maddie Pearce
- 7. Alice Huddlestone
- 9. Claudia Swain
- 10. Valentina Levy Favier
- 11. Harriet Mitchell
- 13. Naomi Kelly
- 14. Sarah-Jane McCann
- 15. Lara Tegner
- 16. Megan Lewis-Williams
- 17. Madeline Pendle
- 18. Rachel Goodwin
- 20. Paige Gillott

== Notable players ==
=== Men's internationals ===
Extended content

Player	Events/Notes	Ref
(England) Percy Rees	Oly (1908)	

Key

- Oly = Olympic Games
- CG = Commonwealth Games
- WC = World Cup
- CT = Champions Trophy
- EC = European Championship
