= Richmond Hockey Club =

Hockey Club

- Full name: Richmond Hockey Club
- League: Men's England Hockey League; Women's England Hockey League
- Founded: 1874; 152 years ago
- Home ground: Quintin Hogg Memorial Sports

Personnel
- Coach: David Goodfield (Men/Open) & Mike Benson (Women)
- Chairman: Mike Rose
- Website: https://www.richmondhockeyclub.com/
Home

Richmond Hockey Club is a field hockey club based in Richmond, London, England. It was established in 1874. The men's 1st XI played in the Premier Division of the Men's England Hockey League in 2024/25 having won the East Conference title in 2022/23 and following that up with the Division 1 South title in 2023/24. In the coming Season 2026/27 they will play in Division 1 South. The Mens 2nd XI have been promoted from the London Premier League and will play in the Men's England Hockey League Conference East Division in 2026/27. The Womens 1st XI were also promoted and will play in London League Division 1 in 2026/27.

== History ==
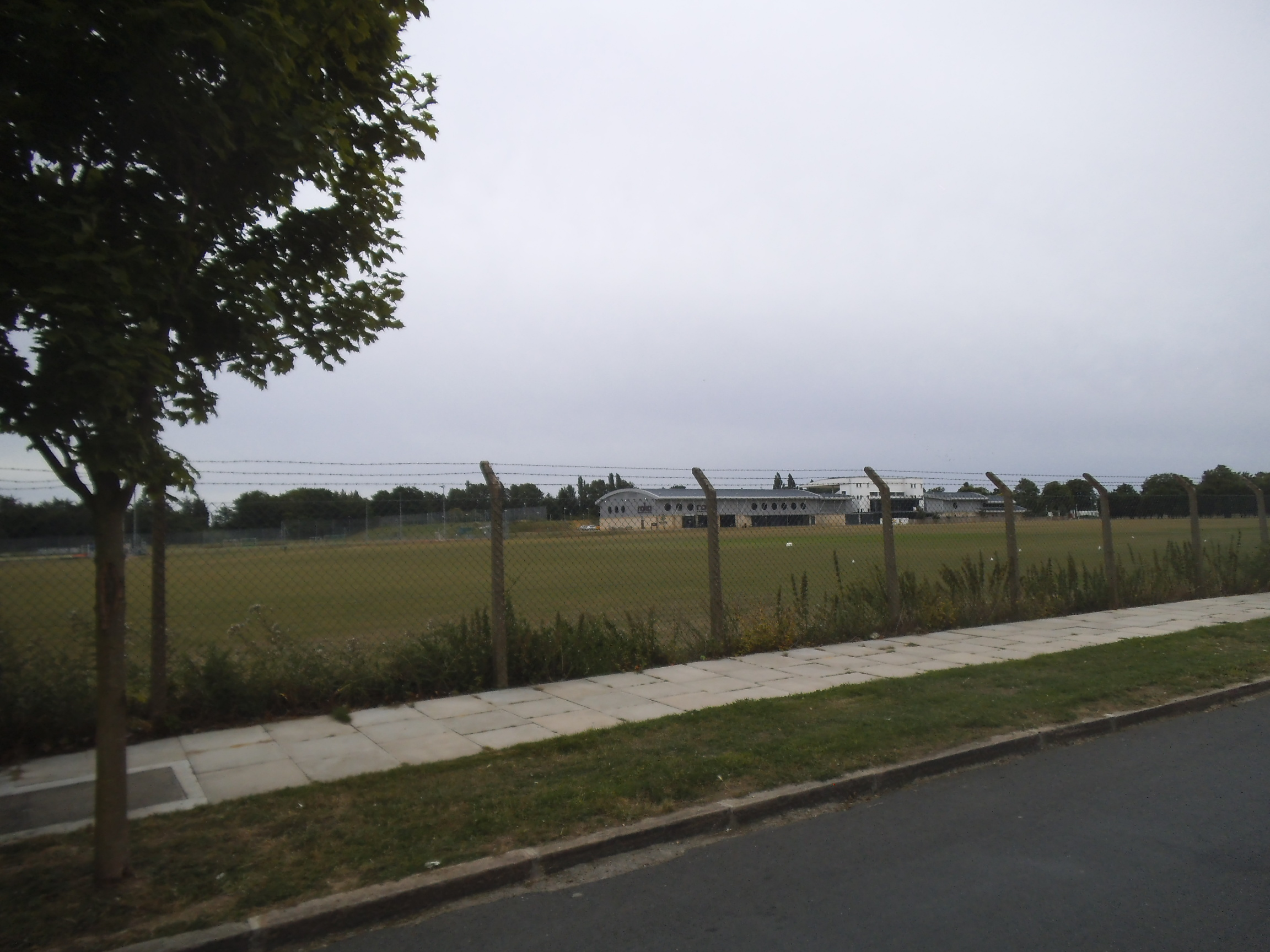
Overlooking the Quintin Hogg Memorial Ground in 2015

Richmond Hockey Club, established in 1874, holds a significant place in the history of field hockey. The club's inception was marked by the selection of Old Deer Park as its home ground, and its inaugural Chairman was Edwin Ash, a key figure in the establishment of the Richmond Rugby Football Union three years earlier.

The club's debut in competitive play took place at Old Deer Park against Teddington Hockey Club, resulting in a 1-1 draw. Notably, this match stands as the longest-standing fixture in world hockey history. In 1875, Richmond became one of the founding members of the Hockey Association – a body that was dissolved in 1882 but reestablished in 1886 as England Hockey – during a dinner at the Holborn Restaurant in London.

Old Deer Park swiftly evolved into a renowned venue for county and divisional fixtures, as well as the annual University match. In 1895, the ground hosted England's first men's international match against Ireland, culminating in a 5-0 victory for England. The ground again witnessed an England-Ireland fixture in 1899, drawing a crowd of 3,000 spectators.

=== 20th century ===
In 1901, Richmond Hockey Club underwent a final reformation and later merged with Kingston Hill Hockey Club in 1919, forming Richmond and Kingston Hill HC. By 1933, the club boasted five teams and a touring XI named the Mohicans, participating in the inaugural Worthing Festival.

After a brief period as Richmond and Kingston Hill HC, the club reverted to the name Richmond HC in 1946. The opening of a new pavilion in 1959 marked a significant development. In 1967, as part of the preparations for the 1968 Summer Olympics, Old Deer Park served as one of the venues for the pre-games tournament, with the club hosting six national teams.

The club commemorated its centenary in 1974 and joined the National League in 1988. That same season, Hounslow Hockey Club, which later merged with Richmond HC, clinched the National League Cup. In 1989, 115 years after its establishment, the club introduced a Ladies section.

The 125th Anniversary Ball in 1999 included a reenactment of the historic match against Teddington at Old Deer Park, resulting in a 3-1 victory for the visitors.

=== 21st century ===
Subsequently, the club bid farewell to its home of 127 years, relocating in 2001 to the Quintin Hogg Memorial Ground in Chiswick. A junior section was established in 2003, and is now one of the largest in the country with numerous teams.

The combined Hounslow and Richmond clubs, now operating as Richmond Hockey Club, returned to the National League in 2012, marking a notable point in the club’s ongoing development.

In 2023, Richmond achieved promotion from the East Conference to Division One South, part of England Hockey's second tier. The year 2024 will mark the club's 150th anniversary, meaning it is one of the two oldest clubs in history, along with Surbiton Hockey Club.

In July 2024 the club updated its logo. On 6 September 2024 the club hosted its 150th Anniversary Ball at The Allianz Stadium, Twickenham, with 250 guests attending.

Currently, the team fields eight men and five women's teams in senior competitions:

| Team | Division |
|---|---|
| Men's First XI | England Hockey Division 1 South |
| Men's Second XI | England Hockey Conference East |
| Men's Third XI | London Men's Division 2 North |
| Men's Griffins | London Men's Division 2 North |
| Men's Deerstalkers | London Division 5 North West |
| Men's Redoubtables | London Division 5 South West |
| Women's First XI | London Women's Division 1 |
| Women's Second XI | London Women's Division 3 South |
| Women's Ravens | London Women's Division 4 South West |
| Women's Fourth XI | London Women's Division 4 North West |
| Women's Fifth XI | London Women's Division 6 South West |

In addition the Men's Rogues play London Masters Over 50's.

The men's first XI is coached by current Great Britain and England international David Goodfield, who is also the 1st XI Captain and player for Surbiton.

== Men's First XI ==
The current first-team men's squad is as follows:

| No. | Pos. | Nation | Player |
|---|---|---|---|
| 1 | GK | ENG | William Burns |
| 2 | DF | ENG | Charlie Patteson |
| 4 | DF | ENG | Scott Wall (Captain) |
| 5 | DF | ENG | Jack Clee |
| 6 | DF | ENG | Mathew Ming |
| 7 | DF | ENG | Jordan Hussell |
| 8 | MF | ENG | Matthew Court |
| 9 | MF | ENG | Joshua Smith |
| 12 | MF | ENG | Fin Dixon |
| 13 | MF | ENG | William Marsh |
| 14 | MF | ENG | Samuel Anderson |
| 15 | MF | ENG | Jac Cleaver |
| 16 | FW | ENG | Thomas Loudon |
| 20 | FW | ENG | Max Evans |
| 1 | GK | SA | Anton Van Loggerenberg |
| 26 | FW | ENG | Samuel Norwood |
| 30 | FW | ENG | Matthew Leigh |
| 31 | DF | ENG | Malachy Barbour |
| 35 | FW | ENG | Stanislas Le Guezec |
| 32 | FW | NZ | Zachary Mason |
| 46 | FW | ENG | Fraser Smellie |
| 17 | MF | ENG | Imre Gerrits |

== Notable players ==
=== Men's internationals ===
Extended content

| Player | Events/Notes | Ref |
|---|---|---|
| (England) Neil Milward Forster | Oly (1956) | |
| (England) John Land | Oly (1964) | |
| (England) Stuart Morris | Oly (1968) | |

Key

- Oly = Olympic Games
- CG = Commonwealth Games
- WC = World Cup
- CT = Champions Trophy
- EC = European Championships
