= Chichester Hockey Club =

English field hockey club

Chichester Hockey Club is a field hockey club based at Chichester College in Chichester, West Sussex. The club also play fixtures at Chichester High School For Girls and Chichester High School For Boys in Kingsham Road and the University of Chichester.

The club runs five men's senior teams and two veteran teams, four women's teams and several junior teams. The men's first X1 play in the England Men's Hockey League Conference West (the second highest tier in England) and the women's first X1 play in the Sussex Ladies League Premier Division.

The men's first team reached the 2016 National Cup final.

== Major honours ==
- 2015-16 Men's Cup Runner-Up

== Men's international players past and present ==
- A J G Parsons (Wales)

Marc Eaton ( Wales )
