= Bromley & Beckenham Hockey Club =

Field hockey club in Beckenham, London, England

- Full name: Bromley & Beckenham Hockey Club
- Founded: 2005
- Home ground: Langley Park Girls School Astro, Beckenham

Bromley & Beckenham Hockey Club is a field hockey club based at Foxgrove Road, Beckenham. It is a combination of two former London clubs Bromley and Beckenham. The club plays the majority of its fixtures at Langley Park School for Girls in Beckenham. In addition the hockey pitches at Langley Park School for Boys, Bromley School in Bickley, and Trinity School in Croydon are also used.

The club runs nine men's senior teams, six women's teams and junior teams. The men's first X1 play in the Men's South Hockey League Premier Division 1. The women's first X1 play in the East Hockey League Premier Division.

Following a vote at an emergency general meeting it was decided that the Beckenham Hockey Club would merge with the Bromley Hockey Club for the start of the 2005–06 season.

== Major Honours ==
National Cup as Beckenham

- 1976-77 Men's Cup Runner-Up

National Cup as Bromley

- 1988-89 Men's Cup Runner-Up

== Notable players ==
=== Men's internationals ===
Extended content

Player	Events/Notes	Ref
(England) Charles Atkin	Oly (1920)	
(Argentina) Juan Martin Gomez Sanchez		
(England) Basil Christensen	Oly (1968)	
(England) Robert Fison	1931–1938	
(Wales) B G Griffiths		
(England) Iqbal Singh Kullar	Oly (1980)	
(England) Alan Page	Oly (1964)	
(Wales) Chris Rule	WC (1982), CT (1981)	
(England) Roger Sutton	Oly (1964)	
(England) Alan Page	Oly (1964)	
(England) William Smith	Oly (1920)	
(England) Paul Svehlik	Oly (1972), WC (1973, 1975)	

Key

- Oly = Olympic Games
- CG = Commonwealth Games
- WC = World Cup
- CT = Champions Trophy
- EC = European Championships
