= England Hockey =

Governing body for field hockey in England

- Industry: Sport - Hockey
- Founded: 2003
- Headquarters: Bisham, Marlow
- Key people: Sophie, Duchess of Edinburgh (patron); Nick Pink (CEO)
- Website: www.englandhockey.co.uk

England Hockey is the national governing body for the sport of field hockey in England. There are separate governing bodies for the sport in the other parts of the United Kingdom.

== History and organisation ==
England Hockey was formed on 1 January 2003 to replace the English Hockey Association (EHA) which had had to suspend operations in 2002 because of significant financial problems. The English Hockey Association had in turn been formed in 1996 to combine the function of the separate governing bodies for men's, women's and mixed hockey. Following the demise of the EHA, England's international hockey was for a time managed through a separate limited company called World Class Hockey Limited, which was funded entirely by Sport England. These operations were merged back into England Hockey on 1 July 2005. The second tier of hockey administration in England consists of five regional associations: East, Midlands, North, South and West, and county associations below.

England Hockey is affiliated to the European Hockey Federation and International Hockey Federation. It runs a number of competitions, including the English Hockey League.

While UK hockey is organised by separate bodies for each of the home nations, the United Kingdom is required to enter a combined team in the Olympics. This has created tensions between the governing bodies and those responsible for the Great Britain teams. However the women's team have been performing well, winning a bronze at the Olympic Games in London 2012 and most recently the gold at the Olympic Games on Rio in 2016.

== Current England Squad ==
The current England Men and England Women Hockey teams train at Bisham Abbey National Sport Centre just outside Marlow.

== Clubs ==
Over 841 clubs across England and the Channel Islands affiliate to England Hockey. The Hockey seasons for clubs are split into the Winter season running from mainly from September to April and the Summer season running from May to August.

== National hockey stadium ==
Following the success in London 2012, the new national stadium for Hockey relocated 500 yards to the Lee Valley Hockey and Tennis centre. The facilities at the £30million Lee Valley Hockey and Tennis Centre include two hockey pitches capable of seating 3,000 and can be scaled up to 15,000 with temporary overlay. Lee Valley hosted the European Hockey Championships in 2015 and the Women's Champions Trophy Event in 2016, The Men's World League Round 3 in 2017 and the Hockey Women's World Cup in 2018 will also have been staged here.

Until early 2009, England Hockey was based at the former, purpose-built, former England National Hockey Stadium in Milton Keynes, but the cost of running the stadium was one of the factors that led to the demise of the English Hockey Association. The ground was leased to Wimbledon (later Milton Keynes Dons) football club in 2003 and has not been used for hockey since then. On 17 December 2009, demolition of the stadium began, the site is now used for a new national HQ for Network Rail.

== Competitions ==
England Hockey runs a series of senior competitions over the course of a year:

- Leagues
  - Men's England Hockey League
  - Women's England Hockey League
- Women's Outdoor
  - England Hockey Women's Championship Cup
  - Investec Women's Trophy
  - Investec Women's Vase
  - Women's Second XI Cup
  - Women's Second XI Plate
- Men's Outdoor
  - England Hockey Men's Championship Cup
  - NOW: Pensions Men's Trophy
  - NOW: Pensions Men's Vase
  - Men's Second XI Cup
  - Men's Second XI Plate
- Mixed Outdoor
  - Mixed Trophy
  - Mixed Plate
  - Men's Senior County Championships
- Indoor
  - Maxinutrition Hockey 5s Championships

In addition to these, there are also several indoor and outdoor junior competitions for both schools and clubs, as well as masters' competitions for over 45s.

== Board of directors ==
- Chief Executive Officer - Nick Pink
- Commercial Director - Jonathan Cockroft
- Development Director - Richard Beer
- Finance & Administration Director - Ian Wilson
- Performance Director - Ed Barney

== See also ==
- Field hockey in Great Britain
