= Thorley, Hertfordshire =

Village in Hertfordshire, England

Coordinates: 51.847°N 0.1491°E

Thorley
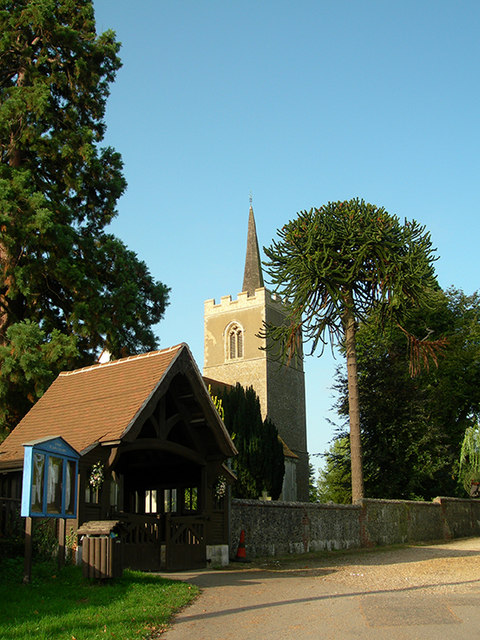
- St James the Great Church, Thorley

- Location within Hertfordshire
- Population: 355 (Parish, 2021)
- OS grid reference: TL 476 189
- District: East Hertfordshire
- Shire county: Hertfordshire
- Region: East
- Country: England
- Sovereign state: United Kingdom
- Post town: BISHOP'S STORTFORD
- Postcode district: CM23
- Police: Hertfordshire
- Fire: Hertfordshire
- Ambulance: East of England
- UK Parliament: Hertford and Stortford

Thorley is a village and civil parish in the East Hertfordshire district of Hertfordshire, England. As well as the village itself, the parish also includes the hamlets of Thorley Street and Thorley Wash. It lies immediately south of the market town of Bishop's Stortford. At the 2021 census the parish had a population of 355.

== History ==
Thorley is listed in the Domesday Book of 1086 as "Torlei", belonging to Geoffrey de Mandeville, a notable Norman baron. During the reign of Edward the Confessor, Thorley Manor belonged to Earl Tostig.

Thorley is less than one mile north from Blounts Farm in the adjoining parish of High Wych, the place where, in 1966, the criminal Harry Roberts was found by police during a long manhunt after he had participated in the Shepherd's Bush murders of three London-based policemen. He was found in a barn hiding under straw. Roberts was familiar with the area as he had often visited it as a child with his mother.

Thorley was an ancient parish in the Braughing Hundred of Hertfordshire. The parish ceded territory to Bishop's Stortford in 1910 and again in 1935. Following the development of further housing estates north of the village which straddled the parish boundary between Thorley and Bishop's Stortford, the parish boundary was adjusted again in 2019 to place the new estates wholly in the parish of Bishop's Stortford.

== Landmarks ==
Thorley Church, dedicated to St James the Great, is a Grade I listed building. It dates to the 13th century and includes a Norman font and a three-seat sedilia. The pulpit was designed by George Gilbert Scott. There is a one-thousand-year-old yew tree in the graveyard, which also has the grave of Daniel Defoe's sister. The graveyard is entered through a lychgate dating from the 1920s. The stocks and whipping post that stood in the graveyard until the late 20th century have now been moved to the Bishop's Stortford Museum. Samuel Horsley was rector of the Church from 1779 to 1782, following in the footsteps of his father John, who was rector from 1745 to 1777. From 1594 to 1610, the rector was Francis Burley, one of the translators of the King James Bible. A 16th-century Tudor barn in the adjoining farm was converted from pig barn to a church and community centre - called the St Barnabas Centre - in 1996 with the help of a £1 million endowment.

Thorley Wash nature reserve is a Site of Special Scientific Interest owned and managed by the Herts and Middlesex Wildlife Trust between the village and the Stort Navigation.

== Amenities ==
Thorley has its own cricket club, Thorley C.C. The nearest local primary schools are Manor Fields Primary, Richard Whittington Primary and Thorley Hill Primary, all within and at the south of Bishops Stortford.

== See also ==
- The Hundred Parishes
