= Bishop's Stortford Museum =

Coordinates: 51°51′49″N 0°09′50″E

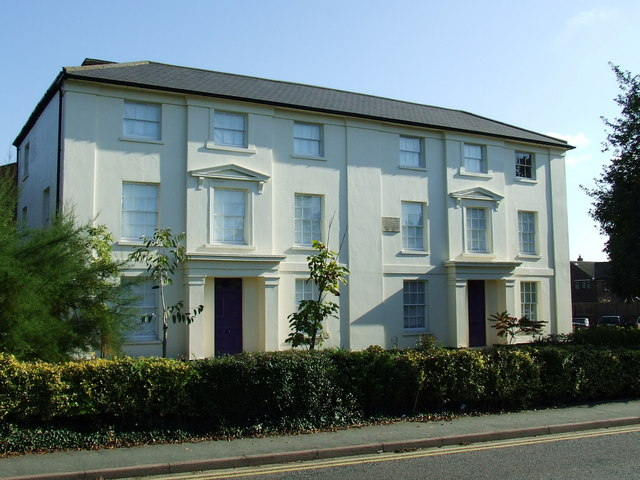
Bishop's Stortford Museum

Bishop's Stortford Museum is a museum in Bishop's Stortford, Hertfordshire, England. It opened in 1938 as the "Rhodes' Birthplace Museum". It is housed in Netteswell House, the birthplace of British imperialist Cecil Rhodes, the financier and founder of diamond company De Beers who gave his name to Rhodesia.

The museum is governed by a trust which is also responsible for the adjacent arts centre, South Mill Arts. Previously the Rhodes Birthplace Trust, it no longer bears Rhodes' name, having been renamed following controversy regarding his legacy.

== Collections ==
Since 2005 the museum has combined the collections of the former Rhodes Memorial Museum and the Bishop's Stortford Local History Museum.

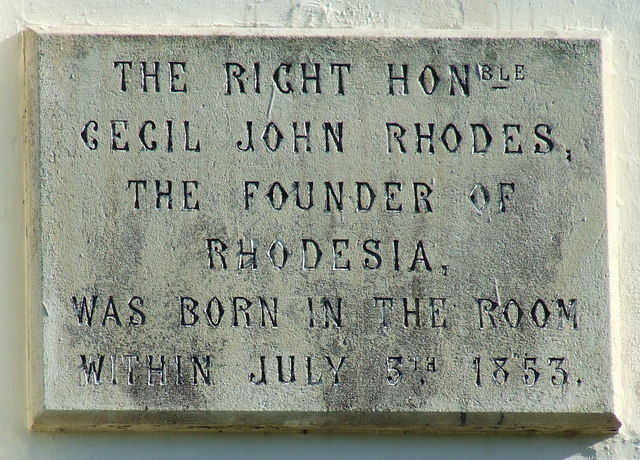
Cecil Rhodes Plaque

Rhodes' home holds exhibits on the life of Rhodes, 19th-century Southern African artefacts from his travels, and a reconstructed middle-class Victorian drawing room with family memorabilia.

== Conservation ==
The 19th-century building has been protected by a Grade II listing since 1949.
