= Thorley Wash nature reserve =

Nature reserve in Hertfordshire, England

Coordinates: 51.8434°N 0.1615°E

Thorley Flood Pound
- Site of Special Scientific Interest
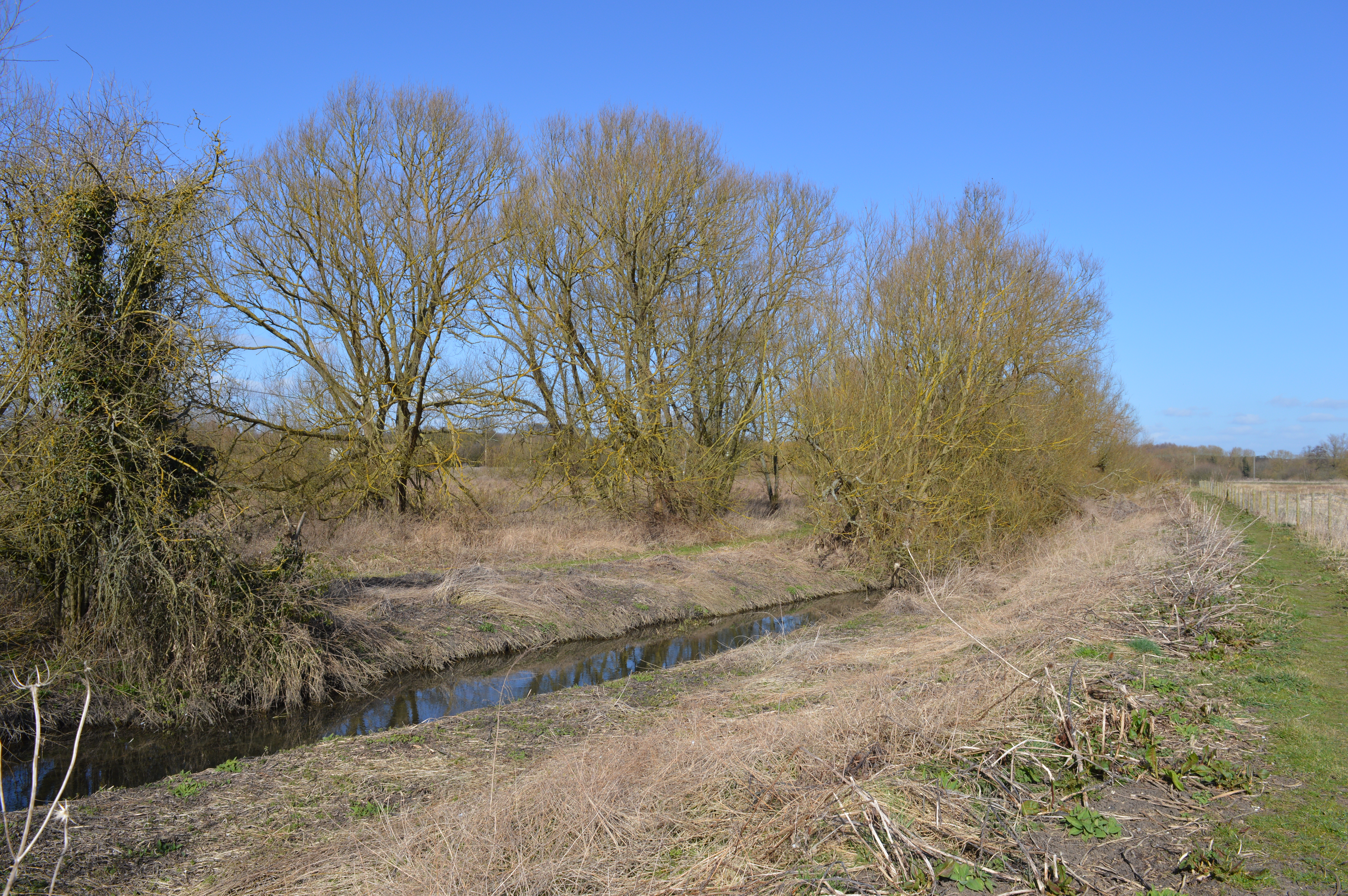
- Channel of the River Stort before it was canalised to become the Stort Navigation
- Location of Thorley Flood Pound.
- Area of search: Hertfordshire
- Grid reference: TL490183
- Interest: Biological
- Area: 17.3 ha (43 acres)
- Notification date: 1986
- Location map: Magic Map

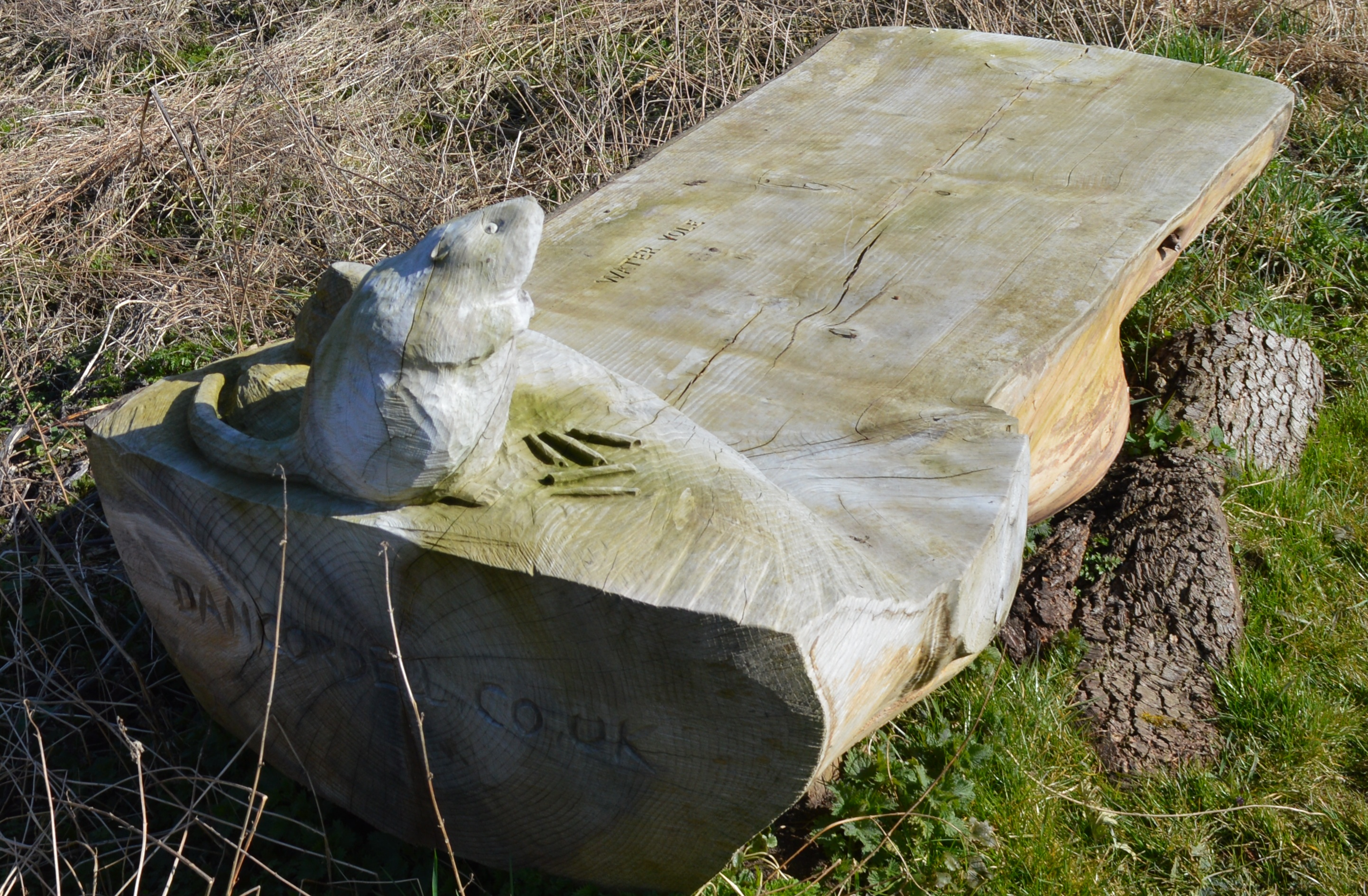
Water vole sculpture by Daniel Cordell

Thorley Wash or Thorley Flood Pound is a 17.3-hectare biological Site of Special Scientific Interest in Thorley, south of Bishop's Stortford in Hertfordshire. It was formerly a flood pound for the Stort Navigation, which was decommissioned in 2004 and converted to a more natural state. It was purchased by the Herts and Middlesex Wildlife Trust from the Environment Agency in 2011.

Habitats include tall wash grassland, which is now rare, marsh and waterlogged grassland. It has a wide variety of plant species, including reed sweet-grass and meadowsweet. There are flowers such as fen bedstraw and early marsh orchid. Breeding birds include snipe and water rails. The site also has the endangered Desmoulin's whorl snail, which is in the Red Date Book, together with diverse dragonflies, damselflies, birds, bats, small mammals and reptiles.

There are five wooden sculptures by Daniel Cordell, commissioned by the Wildlife Trust in 2012.

The Stort Navigation forms the boundary between Hertfordshire and Essex, and the site is on the Hertfordshire bank, but access is by a bridge from the towpath on the eastern Essex side. Access is restricted to footpaths due to the dangerous deep silt on the site.
