= Braughing Hundred =

Braughing hundred was a judicial and taxation subdivision of Hertfordshire, in the east of the county, that existed from the 10th to the 19th century. It was a royal hundred owned by the King of England, until granted by Queen Elizabeth to Sir William Cecil in 1571.

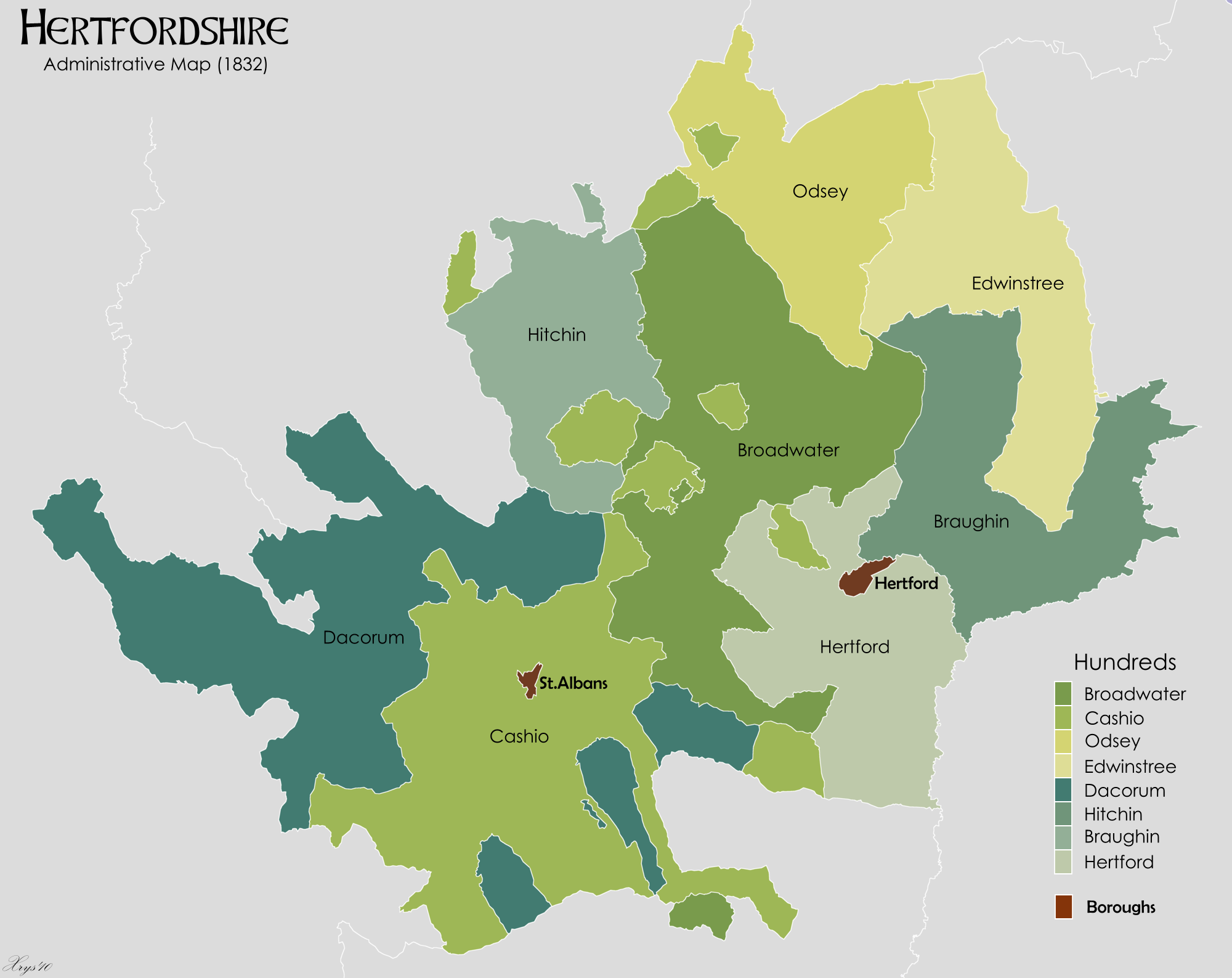
Hertfordshire hundreds in 1832

It originally comprised the following twelve parishes: Bishop's Stortford, Braughing, Eastwick, Gilston, Hunsdon, Sawbridgeworth, Standon, Stanstead Abbots, Thorley, Thundridge, Ware and Westmill. At the time of the Domesday Book, Widford was part of neighbouring Edwinstree hundred but it was transferred to Braughing by the 1300s.

The hundred meeting point was at Braughing, which was one of the main Roman settlements in what is today Eastern Hertfordshire. The area was settled by the Saxon tribe called the Brahhingas and became part of the area of the Middle Saxons within the Kingdom of Essex. When Christianity was introduced into Essex in 604, the area around Braughing became part of the Archdeaconry of Middlesex within the Diocese of East Saxons.

Haslam proposes that the hundred was originally part of a larger "proto-hundred" which comprised the five East Hertfordshire hundreds of Braughing, Edwinstree, Odsey, Broadwater and Hertford; this territory was originally created to support the two Burhs at Hertford, on opposite banks of the River Lea, built by King Edward the Elder in 913 to defend against the Danes. The interlocking nature of Braughing and Edwinstree hundreds is taken as evidence that they were originally part of a single unit that was later subdivided into hundreds.
