= Waytemore Castle =

Medieval fortress in Hertfordshire, England

- Bishop's Stortford, Hertfordshire
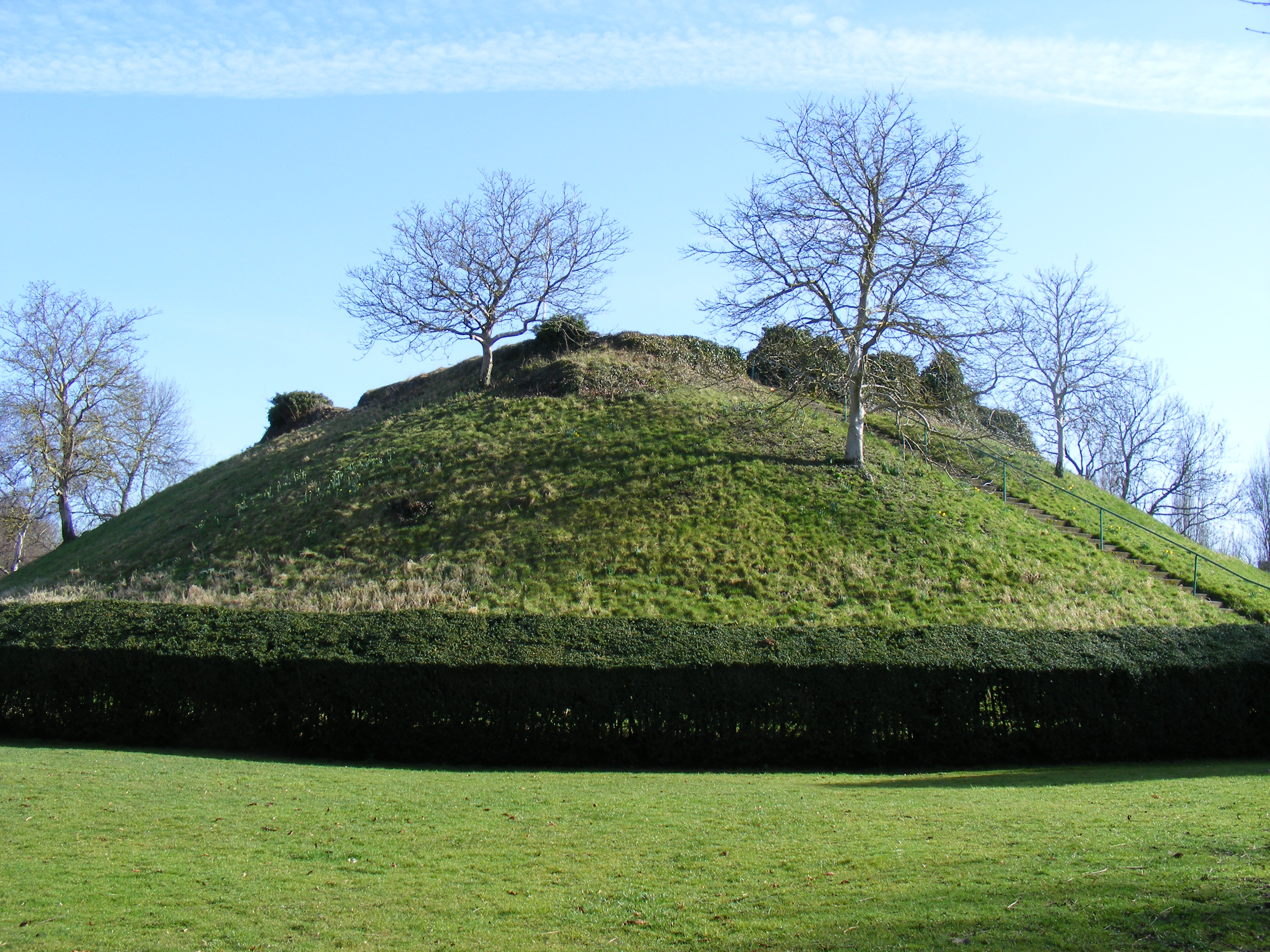
- The castle motte

Site information
- Type: Castle Ruins
- Owner: Bishop's Stortford Town Council
- Open to the public: On Request
- Condition: Ruins

Location
- Coordinates: 51°52′19″N 0°09′47″E
- Grid reference: grid reference TL4900421473

Site history
- Built: c.12th Century
- Built by: Normans
- Materials: Stone

Waytemore Castle is a ruined castle in the town of Bishop's Stortford in Hertfordshire, England. The remains are a Grade I listed structure.

This began as a motte and bailey castle in the time of William the Conqueror. A rectangular great tower was added on the motte in the 12th century. It was improved in the 13th century during the reign of King John and a licence to crenellate was granted in the mid-14th century. It was slighted after the Civil War. In the 17th century it was used as a prison.

Only earthworks, the large motte and foundations of a square tower can now be seen.

== History ==
Some historians believe the mound began as a Celtic barrow, or grave mound, while others think it was a Saxon ‘burh’, a moated and stockaded fortress adapted early in the 10th century by Edward the Elder as a defence against the invading Danes.

It was previously thought that Waytemore Castle got its name from the word "wayte", thought to be Saxon, meaning a place of ambush, and "more" meaning a fen or marsh. The historian Jacqueline Cooper, however, thinks it more likely that "waite" is a corruption of "thwaite", taken from an Old Norse word which means "forest clearing". The word "marr" is another Old Norse word, meaning "boggy place". If so, then this suggests that the later built Norman castle was built on an earlier site that was cleared out of damp woodland.

In 1208 a falling out between King John and the pope of the appointment of the Archbishop of Canterbury led to the pope placing an interdict on England and Wales. In response, John confiscated property belonging to the church including the castles of several bishops. While other castles held by bishops were simply confiscated, the castle at Bishop's Stortford was demolished (slighted).

== Motte and bailey ==
Norman built, or Saxon, the transition of Stortford’s wooden fortress to masonry castle would probably have taken place soon after 1086, although it is thought the keep was not constructed before 1135. The earth mound became the foundation for their familiar motte (mound) and bailey (courtyard) castle and its siting in the valley, as opposed to the usual high ground, was a deliberate move to command the important river crossing.

The 42 feet (13 m) high mound was surrounded by a moat and its top protected by a curtain wall of flint and rubble some 9 feet (2.7 m) thick. The later built keep, probably some 60–70 feet (18–21 m) high, stood within this wall and, to add to its prominence and remind Saxon inhabitants of the town and surrounding areas of Norman power and conquest, its exterior walls were probably painted white with a mixture of lime and chalk. The discovery of foundations consisting of flint and rubble suggest it was rectangular in shape, but while three of its sides were straight, the northern end was convex and bonded irregularly, in parts, with Roman bricks and medieval tiles.

== Ruins ==
The remnants of wall that remain at the mound’s summit are those of the castle keep rebuilt by King John in 1214. The original well in the south-west corner is covered by a large steel plate.

The mound has never been properly excavated, although an investigation in 1850 did reveal parts of the existing wall and a few human bones. A local historian, J. L. Glasscock, made further minor attempts at excavation in 1900 but found only a few Roman coins of the Lower Empire. The most informative find was the accidental discovery in the late 1990s, within the grounds, of a large number of human bones which, experts say, strongly suggests there may have been some kind of medieval hospital attached to the castle.
