= South Mill Arts =

Arts complex and museum in Bishop's Stortford, England

Coordinates: 51.8635°N 0.1640°E

South Mill Arts is a venue for theatre, contemporary arts and culture, and conferences in Bishop's Stortford, Hertfordshire, England. An adjacent 19th-century building, today Bishop's Stortford Museum, was the birthplace of Cecil Rhodes and is a centre for local history.

In the 1960s new buildings were added behind the birthplace to form the Rhodes Memorial Museum and Commonwealth Centre. The complex was refurbished in 2005. It has a 300-seat theatre, a multi-purpose studio space, museum, an exhibition gallery for art and photography, and a café bar. It provides a programme of arts events and hosts professional touring productions, dance groups, musicians and comedians. Films are also shown in its tiered auditorium.

South Mill Arts complex

== Renaming ==
Previously called the Rhodes Arts Complex, on 24 August 2020 the arts complex was renamed to South Mill Arts after a debate in the town and surrounding area. In the wake of the Black Lives Matter protests against institutional racism, the Rhodes Must Fall movement gained further momentum in the UK, thus galvanising calls for the name change, although the campaign had already begun in the town before nationwide attention was brought to the issue.

In the 20th century the name of the registered charity governing the venue was the Cecil Rhodes Memorial Museum and Commonwealth Centre. It changed its name to the Rhodes Birthplace Trust in 2005. In light of concerns around the record of Cecil Rhodes, the trustees renamed the charity again, finally settling on Bishop's Stortford Museum and Arts CIO in 2020.

== Bishop's Stortford Museum ==
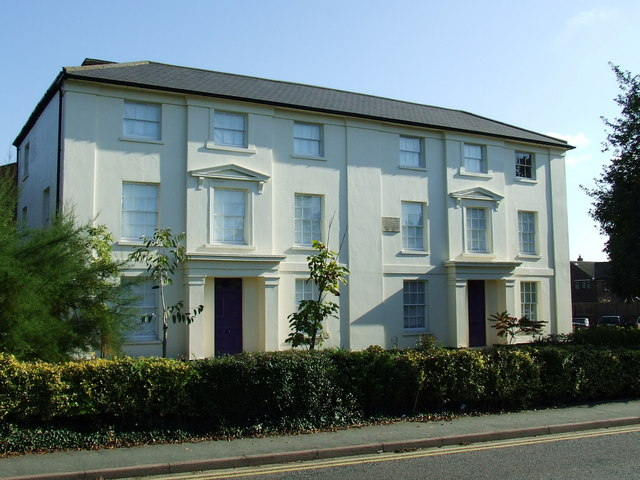
Bishop's Stortford Museum

Netteswell House is a semi-detached property which was the birthplace of British imperialist Cecil Rhodes, the financier and founder of diamond company De Beers who gave his name to Rhodesia.

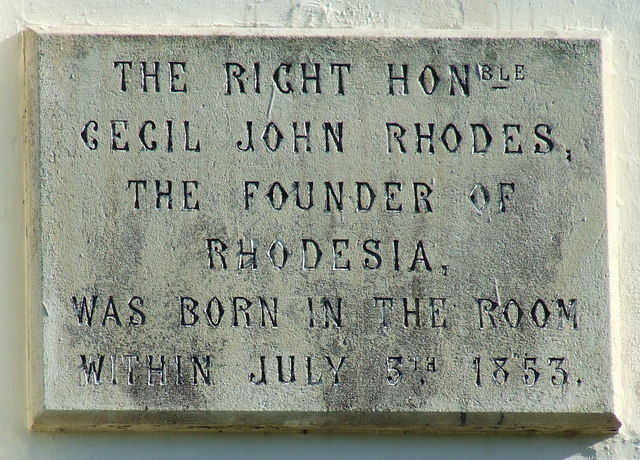
Cecil Rhodes Plaque

The Rhodes' Birthplace Museum opened in 1938 in Netteswell House and the adjacent property. The building is now protected by a Grade II listing.
