= Bishop's Stortford =

Town in Hertfordshire, England

Coordinates: 51.8720°N 0.1725°E

- North Street in the town centre

- Location within Hertfordshire
- Population: 40,955 (Parish, 2021); 40,915 (Built up area, 2021)
- OS grid reference: TL495215
- Civil parish: Bishop's Stortford
- District: East Hertfordshire
- Shire county: Hertfordshire
- Region: East
- Country: England
- Sovereign state: United Kingdom
- Post town: BISHOP'S STORTFORD
- Postcode district: CM22, CM23
- Dialling code: 01279
- Police: Hertfordshire
- Fire: Hertfordshire
- Ambulance: East of England
- UK Parliament: Hertford and Stortford

Bishop's Stortford is a market town and civil parish in the East Hertfordshire district of Hertfordshire, England. It lies 11 miles (18 km) east-north-east of the county town of Hertford and 28 miles (45 km) north-north-east of Charing Cross in central London. The town adjoins the border with Essex. The M11 motorway passes to the east of the town, and Stansted Airport lies immediately east of the motorway. At the 2021 census the parish had a population of 40,955 and the built up area had a population of 40,915.

The town grew up around a ford on the River Stort. Shortly after the Norman Conquest of 1066, the manor of Stortford was bought by the Bishop of London. Around the same time, Waytemore Castle was built beside the ford. The castle's motte still stands in what is now Castle Park on the edge of the town centre. Bishop's Stortford has been a market town since medieval times.

Bishop's Stortford railway station is on the West Anglia Main Line from London Liverpool Street to Cambridge and Stansted Airport.

== History ==
=== Toponymy ===
The origin of the name Stortford is uncertain. One possibility is that the Saxon settlement derived its name from 'Steorta's ford' or 'tail ford', in the sense of a 'tail', or tongue, of land. The River Stort is named after the town, and not the town after the river. When cartographers visited the town in the 16th century, they reasoned that the town must have been named after the ford in the river and assumed the river was called the Stort.

The town became known as Bishop's Stortford after the manor of Stortford was acquired by William the Norman, Bishop of London, sometime between 1066 and 1075. The manor remained the property of the bishops for many years.

=== First settlements: pre-Roman and Roman Stortford ===
Archaeological evidence has been found of ancient Mesolithic and Microlithic peoples inhabiting the area that became Stortford. Flakes, cores, and an axe have been found in the Meads and Silverleys areas. Evidence of Bronze Age occupation has been found to the south of the town in the neighbouring parish of Thorley. A 3,000-year-old socketed spearhead has been found at Haymeads Lane within the town. Evidence of settlement has been found on Dunmow Road dating from the Middle Bronze Age through to Romano-British times. The Stortford area appears to have been only sparsely populated in prehistoric times, and was less important than nearby centres of population such as Braughing and Little Hallingbury.

In Roman times, Stortford was on the line of the Roman road, Stane Street, which ran from St Albans to Colchester via Braughing. Construction started around AD 50 on the road. Little evidence from the period survives except for excavations showing a section of the road, evidence of a cremation facility and a burial site. It has been suggested that it is likely there was a Roman fort near the ford at Stortford, but archaeological excavations have found no evidence for such a fort. Any Roman settlement at Stortford was probably abandoned in the 5th century after the Romans withdrew from Britain.

=== Refoundation: post-Roman and medieval Stortford ===
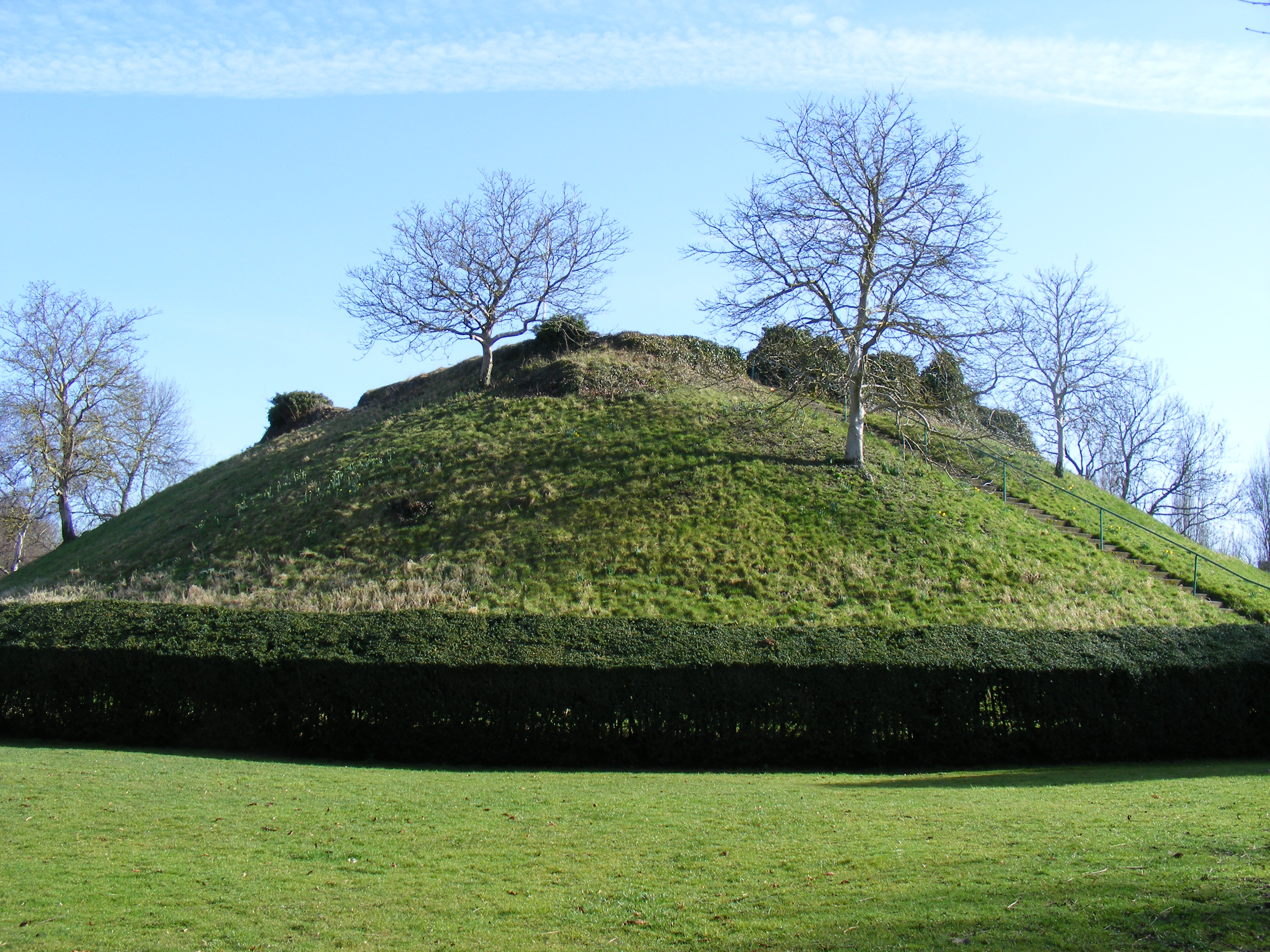
The remains of the motte of Waytemore Castle, with its modern staircase

During the Anglo-Saxon era, a new settlement grew up at Stortford. Immediately prior to the Norman Conquest of 1066, Stortford was a manor owned by someone called Edeva the Fair. The manor was sold to William the Norman, Bishop of London, sometime between 1066 and 1075.

The Domesday Book of 1086 records the manor of Storteford as having 29 households. The population in 1086 is thought to have been around 120.

By 1086, the motte-and-bailey Waytemore Castle had been built. It acted as a centre for defence and was also used for civil administration, hosting the Bishop's Court where the bishops of London administered their role as lord of the manor. In 1211, King John had the castle dismantled. Rebuilding of the castle started the following year at John's expense, and he stayed the night in the castle in 1216. By the 15th century, the castle had fallen into disrepair, and the Bishop's Court had moved to Hockerill, to the east of the town.

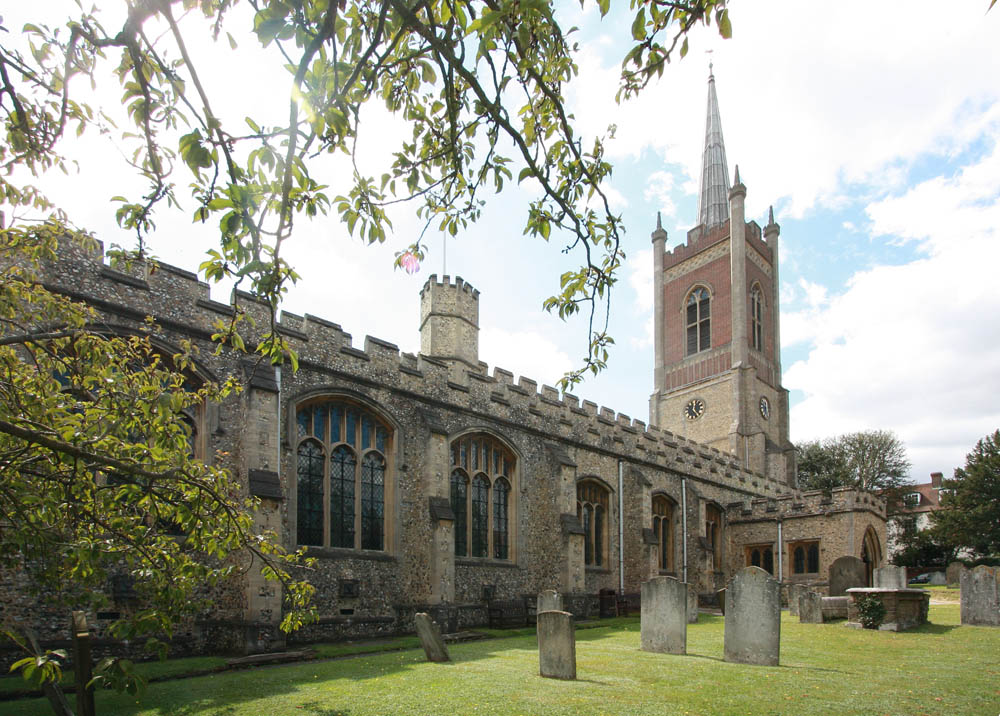
St Michael's Parish Church

A priest is mentioned in the Domesday Book, suggesting Stortford was by then a parish. Its parish church, dedicated to St Michael, was rebuilt in the early 15th century. The upper part of the tower and the spire were added in 1812, and the church forms a notable landmark in the town.

In terms of governance, early medieval Stortford was part of the Braughing Hundred. In the early 14th century the town had some of the characteristics of a borough. Between 1306 and 1336 the town was taxed as a borough and had burgesses. It appears to have been a mesne or seigneurial borough subordinate to the bishops of London as lord of the manor; the town does not appear to have been granted a borough charter. Civil authority came to be exercised through two manorial courts at Waytemore Castle and the Rectory. Stortford briefly served as a parliamentary borough, returning members to parliament several times between 1311 and 1340.

=== Plague and growth: early modern Stortford ===
In the mid 15th century, Stortford was a primarily agricultural community, but had also acquired a tanning industry. By the 16th century, Stortford had become an important centre of the malting industry. Not only were the local soils well suited for grains, but the fact that the town was just 35 miles from London provided an impetus to its development. The economic draw of the maltings and the town's market supported a large number of inns and public houses by the middle of the 16th century pointing to its prosperity.

Over the following hundred years, Stortford grew markedly. The population of Stortford reached 1,500 by 1660. This was despite a series of a dozen plagues between the 1560s and 1660s. Charles I visited the town in 1625, 1629 and 1642.

During the English Civil War in the 1640s, Stortford backed the Parliamentarians, with the Manor of Stortford being sequestered from the bishop of London and sold for £2,845. It was returned to the bishop at the Restoration. The Great Plague of 1666–7 reduced the population to only around 600 by 1700. The effects of the plague were so severe that the town had to appeal to the Hertfordshire magistrates, who responded by levying a rate on every parish in the county for the relief of Bishop's Stortford, Hoddesdon and Cheshunt.

The main north-south route had historically passed through the town centre, running along South Street, Potter Street, North Street and Northgate End. In the 1660s, King Charles II made numerous journeys from London to Newmarket for the races, and he disliked the noise and congestion of Stortford, with its odorous market, maltings and tanneries. Moreover, the route was not always passable, as noted by diarist Samuel Pepys, who made the following entry in his diary on 23 May 1668: 'and so to Bishop's Stafford [sic]. The ways mighty full of water so as hardly to be passed'. As a result, the road from London to Newmarket was diverted to the east of the centre of Stortford in 1670, following a new route which instead ran through the outlying settlement of Hockerill.

The inns of Hockerill become an important overnight location for stop overs for overnight coaches to East Anglia. Further demands for improved roads led to the creation of the Essex and Hertfordshire Turnpike Trust (later Hockerill Turnpike Trust) in 1744 to repair the road between Harlow Bush Common and Stump Cross in Great Chesterford. Later Acts of Parliament extended the term of the Trust and allowed new road construction. From 1785, the mail coaches from London to Norwich ran via Stortford. The improved highways marked the first of the phases of Stortford's growth driven by emergent transport technology.

The second major transport development was the construction of the Stort Navigation, which canalised the River Stort, and opened in 1769. The improvements to the navigation of the Stort were driven by the inability of the malting industry to use the Stort for river transport, which caused significant damage to the local roads and handed a competitive advantage to neighbouring malting areas like Ware, which was linked to London by the River Lea. The work on the canal undertaken by George Jackson (later Sir George Duckett) had the added benefit of alleviating the flooding risk in the town.

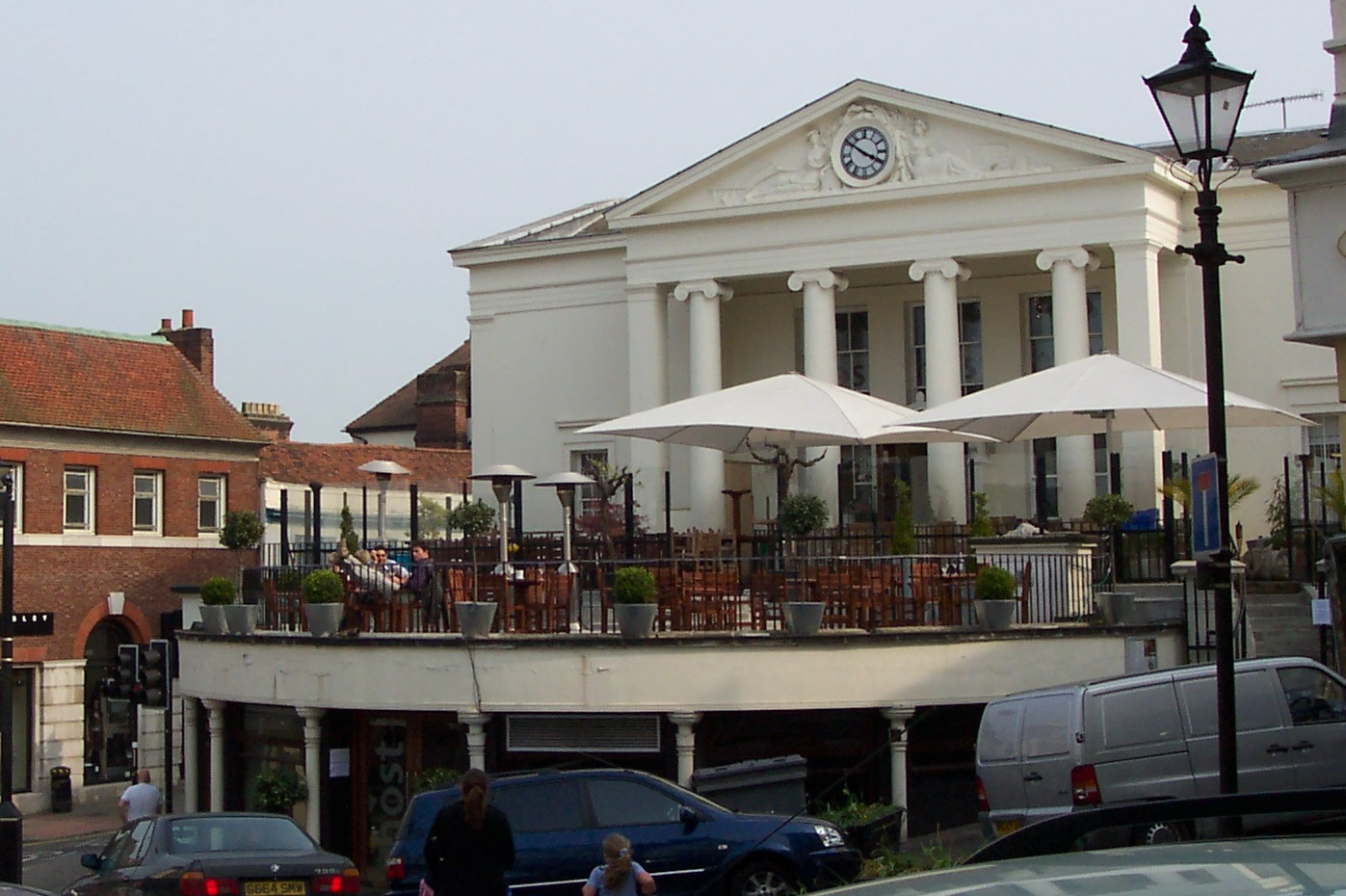
The Corn Exchange

=== Industrial revolution to World War II ===
With the roads and Stort Navigation providing easy access to London markets, industrialisation came to Stortford. The advent of the Stort Navigation brought new industries to the town, with bargemen, lock-keepers, wharfingers, coal and timber merchants all appearing. The malting industry also saw output significantly increase, with brown malt production doubling between 1788 and 1811. Together with national trends in the brewing industry, the 40 malthouses in Stortford in early 1800s Stortford also helped to stimulate the local brewing trade. At the turn of the 19th century, there were 18 brewers in town which in turn boosted the inn trade. The boom in the town in turn boosted the metal working and bricklaying trades, and also aided the general retail trade. In 1791 there were 30 principal traders according to a contemporary directory.

In 1828, a consortium of local businessmen built Bishop's Stortford Corn Exchange, which provided trading accommodation for 65 dealers. By this point, the town directory was listing 200 commercial entries, and 350 by the turn of the century.

The third major transport innovation to have a significant impact upon Stortford was the arrival of the railway. Bishop's Stortford railway station opened in 1842 on the Northern and Eastern Railway, and served as the temporary terminus of the line from London. The line was later extended to Cambridge in 1845, by which time it had become part of the Eastern Counties Railway. The new rail link brought an almost immediate end to the coaching industry, and the Stort Navigation entered terminal decline. The town, though boomed. New residential areas grew up in the New Town (to the south and west of the historic core) and Hockerill (across the river to the east of the historic core) in the decades following the building of the railway. A Bishop's Stortford–Braintree branch line was subsequently built to Braintree, opening in 1864. The Braintree branch line closed to passengers in 1952 and freight in 1972.

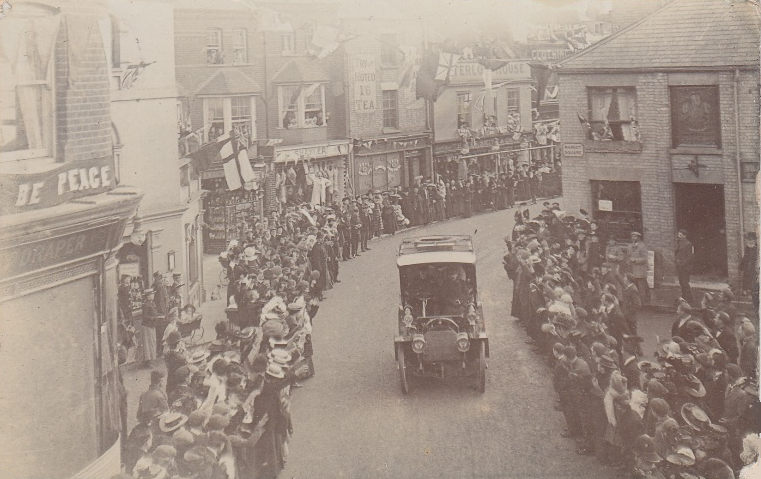
King Edward VII driving through Bishop's Stortford, October 1905

The mid-19th century onwards also saw the rapid growth in public utilities, public services and governance in the town. The first gas street lights were installed in the town in the 1830s, in 1855 the New Cemetery was opened, in the 1870s a sewage farm and an isolation hospital were built, while in 1895 the town's first proper hospital was opened. By 1911, the Encyclopædia Britannica referred to the town as having strong educational pedigree: "The high school, formerly the grammar school, was founded in the time of Elizabeth.... There are a Nonconformist grammar school, a diocesan training college for mistresses, and other educational establishments."

During World War II, Stortford was a reception area for evacuees. This did not, however, mean that Stortford was immune from bombings, with 20 bombs recorded as having been dropped in 1940. Targets included Hockerill Training College where three students were killed on 10 October 1940. The railway station was hit twice during the war and a rocket landed near Farnham Road in the town in 1945.

=== The modern service-industry town ===
In the post-war era the town centre underwent changes with the demolition of a multi-storey car park and surrounding area to make way for a new town centre area and city-type apartments and penthouses on the riverside and elsewhere. Jackson Square (a modern shopping complex) was rebuilt and an extension added.

Stortford continued to grow as a commuter town from the second half of the 20th century onwards, spurred by the construction of the M11 motorway and Stansted Airport, as well as rail links to London and Cambridge. By the 2021 census, the population of the built up area was 40,915.

== Demography ==
Population

Year	Pop.	±% p.a.
1801	2,305	—
1811	2,630	+1.33%
1821	3,358	+2.47%
1831	3,958	+1.66%
1841	4,681	+1.69%
1851	5,280	+1.21%
1861	5,390	+0.21%
1871	6,250	+1.49%
1881	6,704	+0.70%
1891	6,595	−0.16%
1901	7,143	+0.80%
1911	8,721	+2.02%

Year	Pop.	±% p.a.
1921	8,858	+0.16%
1931	9,510	+0.71%
1939	13,374	+4.35%
1951	12,772	−0.38%
1961	18,342	+3.69%
1971	22,121	+1.89%
1981	22,535	+0.19%
1991	27,874	+2.15%
2001	34,857	+2.26%
2011	37,374	+0.70%
2021	40,955	+0.92%

Source: 1801–1961 & 1939 Register Census via Vision of Britain, 1971–1991 Hertfordshire Populations 1801–1991 (Hertfordshire County Council, undated), 2001–2011 ONS Mid-Year Population Estimates, 2021 Census

Stortford had 29 households at the time of the Domesday Book in 1086, with an estimated population of 120. Over the successive centuries the population waxed and waned as a result of economic growth and plagues, and generally only rough population estimates exist. By the time of the first nationwide census in 1801 Stortford's population had reached 2,305. Steady growth continued over the coming decades. Population growth averaged 1.12% per annum through to 1911. Inter-war growth averaged 1.54% per annum. Stortford's population exceeded the county town of Hertford in the 1961 census, even though Stortford's average population growth slowed to 1.39% between World War II and 2020.

Sources of population growth have been predominantly natural growth and in-migration, but on a number of occasions the boundaries of Bishop's Stortford parish have been expanded. Most recently this occurred in 1992 when some neighbouring parts of Essex were moved into the town and in 2019 when homes were moved into Stortford from neighbouring Thorley Parish. In 2021 Bishop's Stortford was the largest town in East Hertfordshire.

== Government ==
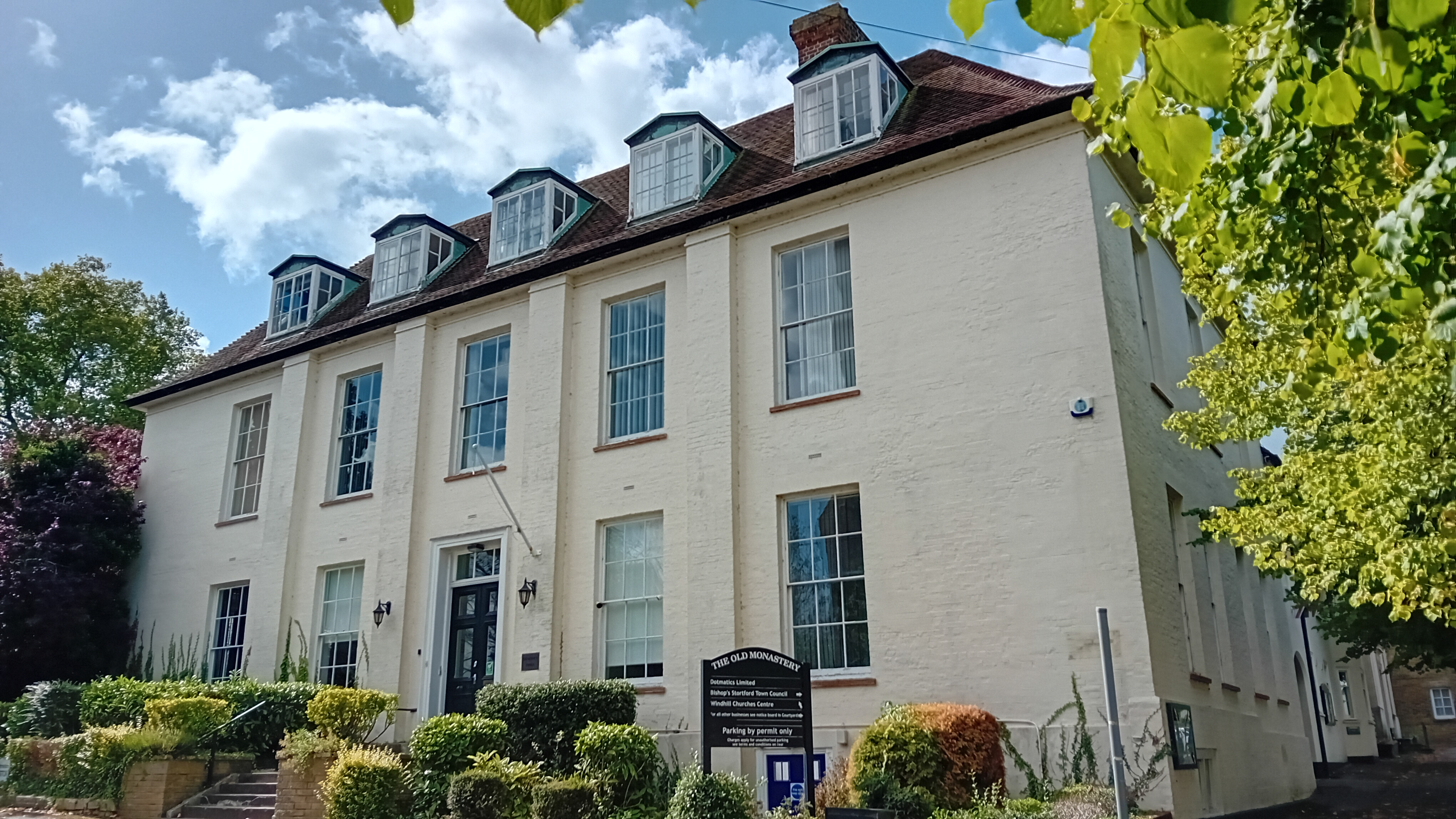
The Old Monastery, Windhill: Now subdivided into offices, including those of Bishop's Stortford Town Council

There are three tiers of local government covering Bishop's Stortford, at parish (town), district, and county level: Bishop's Stortford Town Council, East Hertfordshire District Council, and Hertfordshire County Council. The town council is based at the Old Monastery on Windhill.

=== Administrative history ===
Bishop's Stortford was an ancient parish in the Braughing Hundred of Hertfordshire. The town was historically administered by its parish vestry and manorial courts, in the same way as most small towns and rural areas; no borough corporation was established for the town, despite some limited moves in that direction in the fourteenth century. The Bishop's Stortford Poor Law Union was established in 1835, covering the town and surrounding parishes in both Hertfordshire and Essex.

In 1866, the parish was made a local government district, administered by an elected local board. Such local government districts were reconstituted as urban districts under the Local Government Act 1894.

Bishop's Stortford Urban District Council was initially based at 7 North Street. In 1914, the council bought a large old house called Wharf House at 4 The Causeway. The house had been built by George Jackson, who had also built the adjoining Stort Navigation. Wharf House was renamed the Council House, and served as the council's offices until 1972, when the council moved to purpose-built offices at 1 The Causeway. The Council House was demolished shortly afterwards to make way for the Jackson Square shopping centre.

Bishop's Stortford Urban District was abolished in 1974 under the Local Government Act 1972, becoming part of East Hertfordshire. A successor parish was created covering the former urban district, with its parish council taking the name Bishop's Stortford Town Council. The town council has been based in offices at the Old Monastery on Windhill since 1994.

=== Parliamentary elections ===
Bishop's Stortford is the largest town within the Hertford and Stortford County Constituency for elections to the House of Commons. The constituency covers Stortford, Hertford, Ware, Sawbridgeworth and the surrounding rural areas.

=== Electoral wards ===
For elections to East Herts District Council, Bishop's Stortford has been divided into six wards since the May 2023 local elections wards: All Saints, Central, North, Parsonage, South and Thorley Manor. Bishop's Stortford residents elect 14 of the 50 councillors on East Herts Council. For elections to Bishop's Stortford Town Council, the town is split into nine wards: All Saints, Central, Chantry, Parsonage, Silverleys, South, Thorley Manor North, Thorley Manor South and Waterside.

For elections to Hertfordshire County Council, out of the 78 electoral divisions in total, three divisions cover Bishop's Stortford: Bishop's Stortford East (comprising the areas covered by the All Saints, Parsonage and Chantry Town Council Wards), Bishop's Stortford Rural (the South, Thorley Manor South Town Council Wards together with the Little Hadham and Much Hadham East Herts District Council Wards) and Bishop's Stortford West (the Central, Silverleys, Thorley Manor North and Waterside Town Council Wards).

=== Sister cities ===
After 46 years of being twinned with the German town of Friedberg and Villiers-sur-Marne in France, the town council ended links in 2011.

== Economy and business ==
Stortford is a prosperous town. The key drivers of its growth according to the Town Wide Employment Study for Bishop's Stortford are "Stansted Airport, an excellent rail service into central London and good road links via the M11 to London, the M25 northern sub-region and Cambridge. Stortford is well positioned in relation to the UK's most dynamic economies." This study also highlights Stortford's skilled population, as well as the importance of "quality of life" as an important economic asset. In addition to East Hertfordshire topping the Halifax Quality of Life survey in 2020, Stortford has been highlighted as a popular commuter town in articles in The Times, The Evening Standard, and the Metro newspaper London.

Like the UK as a whole, Stortford has a highly service-based economy. In the 2011 census, 84.5% of Stortford residents in employment stated that they worked in a service industry, which was higher than East Hertfordshire (81.2%) and England (81.2%). Of particular note is that 7.9% of local workers are employed in Transportation and Storage which is well above the English average of 5.0%. The most significant employer in this industry is Stansted Airport, which was estimated in 2013 to employ at least 1,000 people who live in Stortford.

Employment By Industry of Bishop's Stortford Residents, UK SIC Classifications (2011 census)
	Bishop's Stortford		East Hertfordshire		England	
	Number	%	Number	%	Number	%
Primary Industries (A-B)	25	0.1	459	0.6	203,789	0.8
Manufacturing (C)	1,468	7.4	6,161	8.5	2,226,247	8.8
Utilities (D-E)	139	0.7	566	0.8	315,362	1.3
Construction (F)	1,446	7.3	6,355	8.8	1,931,936	7.7
Services (G-U)	16,851	84.5	58,635	81.2	20,442,085	81.2
Wholesale and Retail Trade (G)	3,327	16.7	11,268	15.6	4,007,570	15.9
Transportation and Storage (H)	1,581	7.9	3,553	4.9	1,260,094	5.0
Accommodation and Food Service (I)	893	4.5	3,058	4.2	1,399,931	5.6
Other Services (J-U)	11,050	55.4	40,756	56.4	13,774,490	54.7
All usual resident 16–74 in employment	19,941	100	72,225	100	25,162,721	100

Commuters represent a sizeable proportion of the local working age population. The Town Wide Employment Study estimated in 2013 around 3,000 people (with around 15% of those in employment) commute from Stortford by rail, with the largest proportion "in all probability" travelling into Central London. This is reflected in Stortford in the 2011 census having a much higher proportion of workers in managerial and professional occupations than the national average, as shown in the table below.

Employment By Occupation, UK SIC Classifications (2011 census)
	Bishop's Stortford		East Hertfordshire		England	
Occupations	Number	%	Number	%	Number	%
All usual resident 16–74 in employment	19,941	100.0	72,225	100.0	25,162,721	100.0
Managers, directors and senior officials	2,682	13.4	10,639	14.7	2,734,900	10.9
Professional	4,058	20.4	14,636	20.3	4,400,375	17.5
Associate professional and technical	3,056	15.3	11,160	15.5	3,219,067	12.8
Administrative and secretarial	2,377	11.9	8,968	12.4	2,883,230	11.5
Skilled trades	1,776	8.9	7,589	10.5	2,858,680	11.4
Caring, leisure and other service	1,839	9.2	5,740	7.9	2,348,650	9.3
Sales and customer service	1,546	7.8	4,345	6.0	2,117,477	8.4
Process plant and machine operatives	979	4.9	3,573	4.9	1,808,024	7.2
Elementary	1,628	8.2	5,575	7.7	2,792,318	11.1

Stortford itself has a strong internal economy, with an estimated 16,985 people employed within the town boundaries. There are 329 businesses established in the town centre (as of 2018) represented by the Bishop's Stortford Business Improvement District (BID). There is also a Bishop's Stortford Chamber of Commerce.

Stortford is considered the Principal Town Centre in East Hertfordshire by East Hertfordshire District Council's District Plan, serving as a destination for visitors from beyond the town. There is both an indoor shopping centre, Jackson Square, and a traditional high street running along the axis of South Street, Potter Street and North Street, as well as the adjoining streets. The town has a twice weekly market and a monthly farmers market run by Bishop's Stortford Town Council.

Estimated Employment in Bishop's Stortford (Usual Place of Work), UK SIC Classifications
Industry	2020	%
Agriculture, forestry & fishing (A)	0	0
Mining, quarrying & utilities (B, D and E)	35	0.2
Manufacturing (C)	800	4.7
Construction (F)	1,000	5.9
Motor trades (Part G)	700	4.1
Wholesale (Part G)	700	4.1
Retail (Part G)	2,500	14.7
Transport & storage (inc postal) (H)	350	2.1
Accommodation & food services (I)	1,250	7.4
Information & communication (J)	800	4.7
Financial & insurance (K)	600	3.5
Property (L)	350	2.1
Professional, scientific & technical (M)	1,750	10.3
Business administration & support services (N)	1,750	10.3
Public administration & defence (O)	100	0.6
Education (P)	1,750	10.3
Health (Q)	1,750	10.3
Arts, entertainment, recreation & other services (R, S, T and U)	800	4.7
Total	16,985	100

== Local media ==
The Bishop's Stortford Independent newspaper covers Stortford, along with the neighbouring towns of Sawbridgeworth and Stansted Mountfitchet. The newspaper was founded in October 2017 following the closure of the Stortford office of the Herts and Essex Observer newspaper in 2016.

The town is also covered by a number of print magazines including the Bishop's Stortford Flyer, CM23 Connection, Axis Magazine, and The BISH.

Local news and television programmes are provided by BBC London and ITV London. Television signals are received from either the Crystal Palace or the local relay transmitters. BBC East and ITV Anglia can also be received from the Sandy Heath TV transmitter.

Local radio stations are BBC Three Counties Radio and Heart Hertfordshire.

== Transport ==
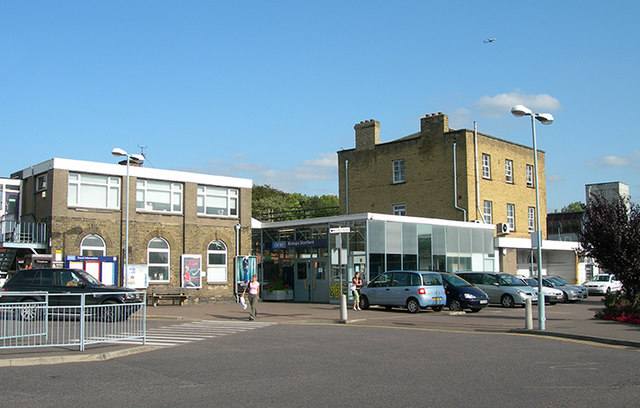
The station forecourt in 2006

=== Railway ===
Bishop's Stortford railway station is a stop on the West Anglia Main Line and was first opened in 1842. There were 2.00 million passenger entries and exits in 2020/21.

The station is served by three routes, all operated by Greater Anglia:

- A fast Stansted Airport to London Liverpool Street service, stopping only at Tottenham Hale.
- Cambridge North to Liverpool Street, via Harlow Town, Tottenham Hale and at most intermediate stations.
- A direct service to Stratford in East London, which calls at most intermediate stations.

Epping tube station on the London Underground Central line is about 10 miles away from Stortford; the line provides a stopping service through Central London to Ealing Broadway in the west.

=== Roads ===
The M11 motorway passes to the east of Bishop's Stortford. Junction 8 links the motorway to the town and the M11 carries traffic directly to Cambridge, Harlow and London. As the road passes the town, Bishop's Stortford falls in the M11 corridor for innovation.

The A120 runs east–west along the northern edge of the town. To the west, the A120 meets the A10 at Puckeridge (for Hertford or Royston). To the east, the A120 passes Stansted Airport en route to Braintree, Colchester, the A12 and Harwich.

Other key routes in the town include:

- A1060 to the Hatfield Heath, the Rodings and Chelmsford
- A1184 to Sawbridgeworth and Harlow
- A1250 east–west route through the town centre
- B1383 to Stansted Mountfitchet and Saffron Walden

==== Air pollution ====
East Hertfordshire District Council monitors nitrogen dioxide (NO_{2}) levels at Hockerill Junction in the town centre. There are four diffusion tubes around the junction for air quality monitoring. In 2017, three out of four tubes failed to meet the UK National Objective of 40μg/m^{3} (micrograms per cubic metre):

NO_{2} levels at Hockerill Junction (2017 average)
Location	NO_{2} concentration (μg/m^{3})
Stansted Road	36.0
Hockerill Street	41.3
Dunmow Road	45.6
London Road	56.3

=== Air ===
Stansted Airport is located to the east of the town, with rail and bus links to Stortford; it serves over 200 destinations globally.

=== Buses ===
The town is on the Arriva Herts & Essex bus network. Buses 309, 508, 509 and 510 connect the town to Stansted Airport. Local route 511 connects Thorley Park and St James' Park with Bishop's Park via the train station. Buses 508, 509 and 510 all terminate to the south in Harlow.

Central Connect, operated by Vectare, also serve the town. Key routes include the 35 to Hertford and the 36 to Stevenage, via Letchworth. There are further routes to rural destinations in Hertfordshire and Essex.

=== Canal ===
The Stort Navigation is the canalised section of the River Stort running 22 kilometres (14 mi) from Bishop's Stortford, downstream to its confluence with the Lee Navigation at Feildes Weir near Rye House, Hoddesdon.

=== Cycling ===
Stortford is served by the following cycle routes on regional networks and the National Cycle Network:

- National Cycle Route 11 is an incomplete cycle route which will run through the town centre. Completed sections of the route currently pass through Harlow, Sawbridgeworth, Stansted Mountfitchet and Cambridge. The section between Sawbridgeworth and Stortford is in development but, when completed, the route will provide a direct, non-stop connection from Stortford to the Lea Valley (southbound) and King's Lynn (northbound).
- National Cycle Route 16 passes just to the northeast of Stortford. The route is segregated from traffic, running non-stop to Great Dunmow. The route continues east on on-road and off-road routes to Braintree and Witham.
- The Bishop's Stortford Circular Ride is a recreational cycle route on country lanes to the north of the town. The route begins and ends on Northgate End in the town centre; it passes through Patmore Heath, Stocking Pelham, Brent Pelham, Little Hormead, Braughing and Albury.
- The River Stort towpath is a shared-use path which begins in Stortford. Running parallel to the river, the path links the town directly to Sawbridgeworth and Harlow; it eventually reaches the River Lea towpath towards Hertford, or Tottenham and London's East End. Parts of the towpath carry NCR 11. The route is maintained by the Canal and River Trust.

== Landmarks ==
The historic core of Stortford is covered by a Conservation Area, which roughly aligns with the boundaries of the town in 1874–1894. As of the last formal Appraisal of the Conservation Area in 2014, there were 105 listed buildings in Stortford, including 71 within the Conservation Area. Two of the buildings are Grade I listed: Waytemore Castle and St Michael's Church. Grade II* listed buildings include 10 Bridge Street (the Black Lion pub), 30 High Street (the Boar's Head restaurant) and 8–10 High Street. Much of the Conservation Area is also an Area of Archaeological Significance.

=== Castle mound ===
Waytemore began as a motte and bailey castle in the time of William the Conqueror. A rectangular great tower was added to the motte in the 12th century. It was improved in the 13th century under King John and a licence for crenellation was granted in the mid-14th century. It lost significance after the Civil War and was used as a prison in the 17th century.

Only earthworks, the large motte, and the foundations of a square tower can now be seen.

=== Corn Exchange ===
Bishop's Stortford Corn Exchange is a Greek Revival style building completed in 1828. The use of the building as a corn exchange declined significantly in the wake of the Great Depression of British Agriculture in the late 19th century. It initially became a meeting venue, and is currently used by commercial and leisure businesses.

=== All Saints' Church ===
In 1935 All Saints' Church, Hockerill was destroyed by fire, and in 1937 a new church, to a spacious, light, and airy design by the architect Stephen Dykes Bower, was erected in its place. This is a Grade II listed building and the tower dominates the eastern skyline of the town. The church contains a notable rose window designed by Hugh Ray Easton and a two-manual Henry Willis II organ. Concerts are also held there.

== Notable people ==
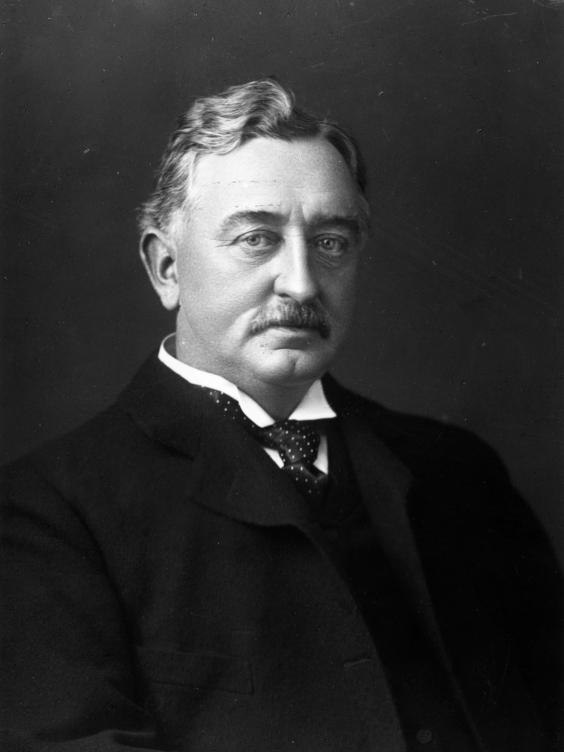
Cecil Rhodes

- Cecil Rhodes, (1853–1902), the son of the vicar of St Michael's Church, was the founder of the region of Rhodesia (now Zambia and Zimbabwe), and of the De Beers diamond company and the Rhodes Scholarship.
- Sir Walter Gilbey, 1st Baronet, businessman, wine merchant and philanthropist.
- Caroline Spelman, Conservative MP and former cabinet minister, was born in Bishop's Stortford and attended the Hertfordshire and Essex High School.
- Paul Epworth (born 1974), Grammy, BRIT Award and Academy Award (Oscar)-winning record producer.

== Education ==
Stortford schools regularly appear in rankings of the best schools in the country, with Hockerill Anglo-European College, The Hertfordshire and Essex High School, and The Bishop's Stortford High School frequently being top performers in The Sunday Times Schools Guide. Hertfordshire County Council is the education authority for the state schools in Bishop's Stortford, and is responsible for admissions.

All of the state primary schools in Stortford have nurseries attached, while all of the state secondaries have sixth forms. Bishop's Stortford High School and Herts and Essex High School are a single sex boys and girls school, respectively, from years 7–11 but both have mixed-sex sixth forms. There is also an independent school, the Bishop's Stortford College, which covers ages 4 to 18.

There are no further education or higher educational institutions in Stortford. However, nearby educational options include Stansted Airport College, Harlow College, Hertford Regional College, and Cambridge Regional College.

The town previously had a boys' grammar school, Bishop's Stortford Grammar School, later Bishop's Stortford School. This was founded in the sixteenth century. Pupils included Francis Barber, the Jamaican manservant of Samuel Johnson, in the eighteenth century, and Cecil Rhodes, the mining magnate and politician, in the nineteenth century. One of the headteachers was the seventeenth-century grammarian Christopher Cooper.

	Schools
State Nursery and Primary Schools	All Saints C of E Primary and Nursery School, Avanti Meadows Primary School, Hillmead Primary School, Manor Fields Primary School, Northgate Primary School, St Joseph's Catholic Primary, St Michael's C of E VA Primary, Summercroft Primary School, The Richard Whittington Primary School, Thorley Hill Primary School, Thorn Grove Primary School, Windhill21
State Secondary Schools	Avanti Grange, Birchwood High School, The Bishop's Stortford High School, The Hertfordshire and Essex High School, Hockerill Anglo-European College, St Mary's Catholic School
Private Schools	Bishop's Stortford College

== Sport ==
=== Football ===
Semi-professional football team Bishop's Stortford F.C. were formed in 1874 and play at Woodside Park in the town; the stadium lies on a county boundary and is in both Hertfordshire and Essex. They are currently members of the Southern League Premier Division Central, the seventh tier of the English football pyramid. The club have won two national titles: the 1973–74 FA Amateur Cup and the 1980-81 FA Trophy, becoming the first club to win both competitions. Bishop's Stortford Community Football Club are one of the largest clubs of their type in the country, with over 80 teams and nearly 1,000 members, as of the 2020–21 season.

=== Hockey ===
Bishop's Stortford Hockey Club was formed in 1948 and is based at The Hertfordshire and Essex High School, with a clubhouse and state of the art pitch. They have fourteen senior sides: six men's and eight ladies' playing in the East Hockey Leagues. The Men's 1st XI play in the East Men's Division 1 South and the Ladies' 1st XI play in the Vitality Women's Conference East. – along with a thriving junior section with over 500 members.

The club has a number of current and former international players still involved with coaching or playing, including Rob Clift (gold medallist), Bernie Cotton, Pippa Bull, Vernon Brown and Ronnie Stott, in addition to a number of senior members who still represent their country at Masters level.

=== Cricket ===
Bishop's Stortford Cricket Club play their home matches at Cricket Field Lane, which is also a home venue for Hertfordshire County Cricket Club. Thorley Cricket Club play in Bishop's Stortford and, as of 2021, had 40 adult members and over 100 children in their summer coaching programme. Hockerill Cricket Club play at their ground on Beldams Lane which they share with Bishop's Stortford Running Club. BSRC supports road running and cross-country running.

=== Rugby ===
Bishop's Stortford Rugby Football Club play in National League 1, the third tier of English rugby. In total, the club has around 700 male players across its Mini, Youth and Senior teams, as well as over 80 female players, as of 2021.

=== Other Sports ===
Public sports facilities include the Grange Paddocks swimming pool and gym, a tennis club, a squash club and a golf club. A concrete skateboard park plaza, featuring a back-and-forth run with a quarter-pipe and flat bank either side of several ledges and a rail, is located in the town park. Bishop's Stortford Town Council is investing in the facility to create a broader "teenage recreation space".

== Culture ==
=== South Mill Arts ===
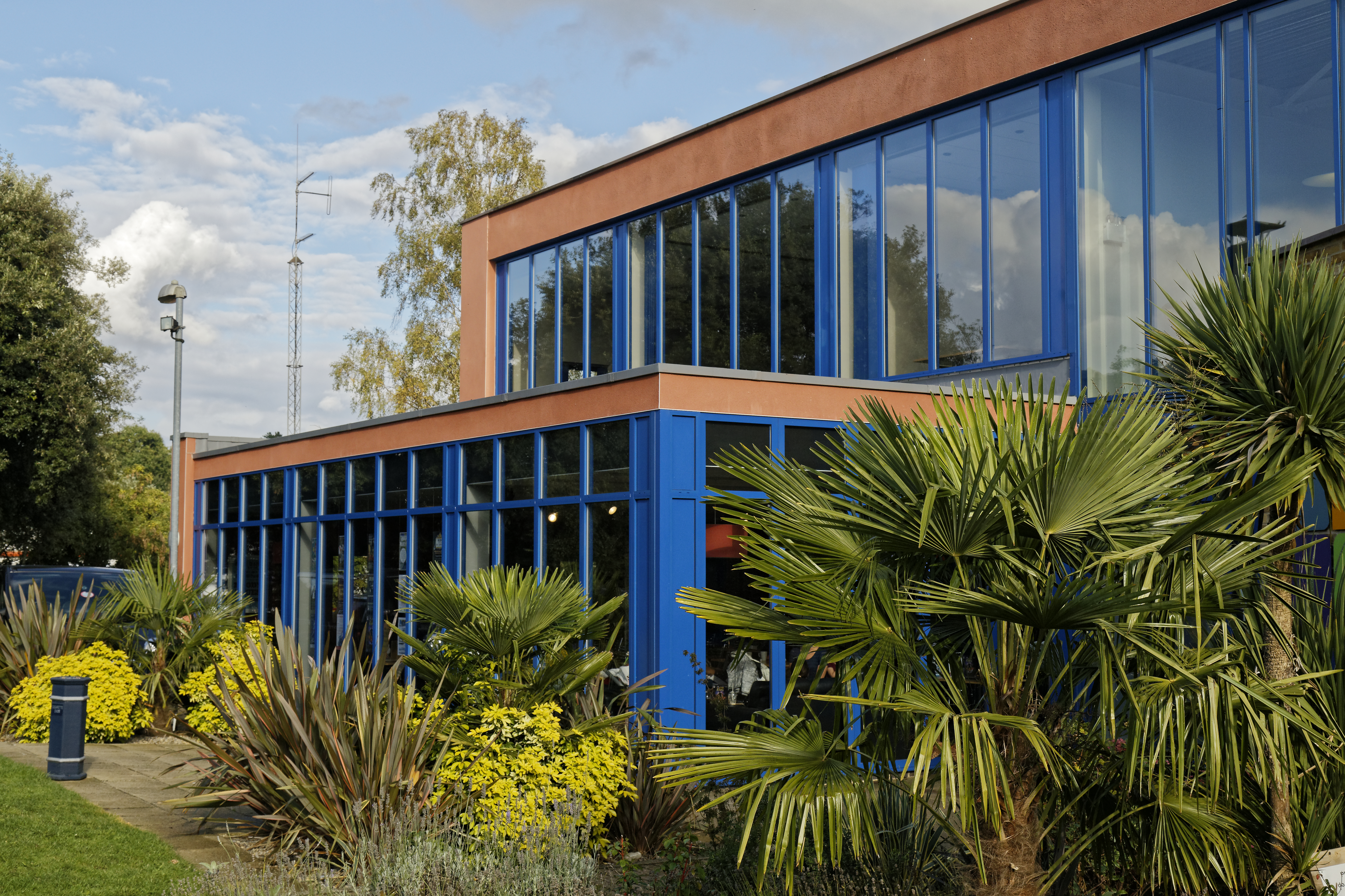
South Mill Arts theatre and museum

The South Mill Arts complex (formerly the Rhodes Arts Complex) incorporates a theatre, cinema, dance studio and conference facilities. Situated within the complex, in the house where Cecil Rhodes was born, is the Bishop's Stortford Museum. It has a local history collection, a unique collection relating to Rhodes and the British Empire in Africa, as well as a temporary exhibition gallery.

South Mill Arts is the town's largest live music venue. In the 1960s, the Rhodes Theatre had a string of concerts by now very high-profile musicians, who were then at the start of their careers. Performers included David Bowie, Stevie Wonder and Lulu as well as iconic bands such as The Who, The Animals, The Moody Blues, Small Faces and Wayne Fontana and The Mindbenders.

=== Other ===
Located in the town centre is the Complex, Anchor Street Entertainment, a multiplex which contains a health club, bowling alley and a number of food outlets.

The town is home to two amateur dramatics groups, The Water Lane Theatre Group and Bishop's Stortford Musical Theatre Company.

The town is home to various youth organisations and youth groups, including an Army Cadet Force detachment, an Air Training Corps squadron, Scout troops, and a GAP youth group affiliated to the Church of St James the Great in Thorley.

=== Fairs ===
There is an annual Christmas Fayre in December, with over 100 stalls and family-friendly entertainment. There is also a summer Carnival, involving a procession with over 100 community groups taking part, bands, fairground rides, entertainers and stalls.

== Pubs ==
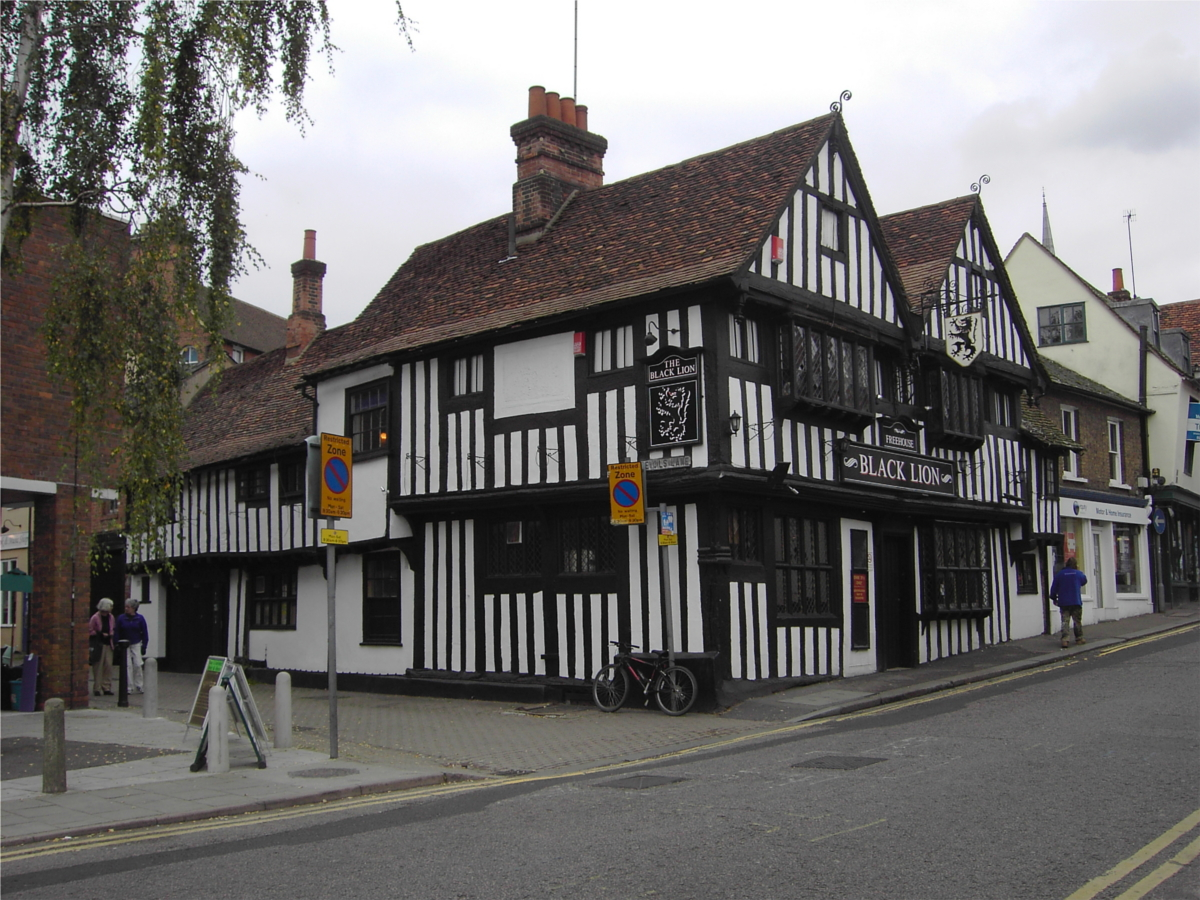
The Black Lion

Being a market town and major coach stop between London and Cambridge, Stortford has many large public houses within the town centre. In 1636 The Star in Bridge Street was run by John Ward. The Inn was acquired by Hawkes and Co. and bought in 1808. In the early 20th century The Star catered for cyclists, providing cycle sheds that attracted people from local villages. John Kynnersley Kirby (1894–1962), painted local scenes and portraits of local characters, painted the interior of The Star for a painting entitled The Slate Club Secretary

Other public houses included the 15th-century Boars Head, 16th-century Black Lion, and the Curriers Arms was in Market Square from the 1700s until 1904, in the building which until recently was a Zizzi restaurant. Between 1644 and 1810, the Reindeer operated on the present site of the Tourist Information Centre. Another notable establishment was the Tanners Arms, built around 1850 alongside a former tannery. It was originally owned by Joseph Whitby and later acquired by McMullen's Brewery of Hertford in 1895. The pub closed in 2011, and the building is now occupied by IT company ITVET.

== Geography ==
Stortford has grown around the River Stort valley, with the town centre lying about 60 metres above sea level, rising to over 100 metres above sea level on the eastern and western margins of the town.

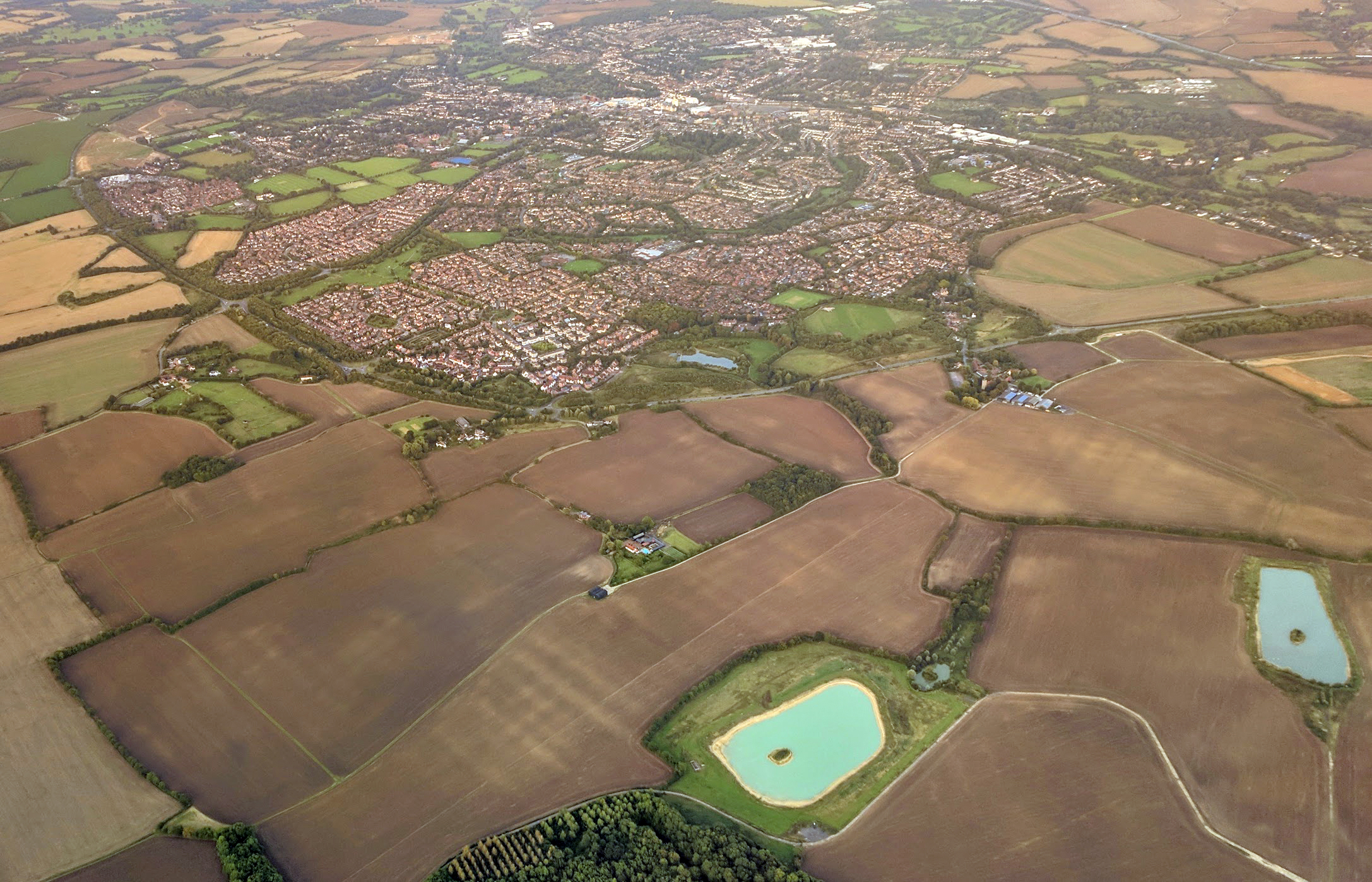
Aerial view of Bishop's Stortford and vicinity, on takeoff from Stansted Airport

Being in the south-east, the town enjoys a warmer climate than most of Britain and summer temperatures may sometimes reach the mid-30s °C. It is also one of the driest places in the country. Snow is often seen in the winter months because the town is near the east coast, where cold, moist air is brought in from the North Sea and cold fronts from northern Europe. In recent years there has been up to three inches of snow early in the year, which has resulted in minor disruption to transport and caused some schools to close for several days. However, the snow tends not to persist in any noticeable quantity.

Water for the town is supplied by Affinity Water. The water is classed as very hard with over 345 mg/L of minerals and 0.225 mg/L of fluoride.

=== Climate ===
Stortford, like much of lowland Britain, has a temperate maritime climate, with cool summers and mild winters. The nearest weather station for which averages and extremes are available is Stansted Airport, about 2 1/2 miles (4 kilometres) due east of Stortford's town centre. Located at an elevation of over 100 m, the weather station, and parts of Stortford in general are marginally cooler throughout the year than the Cambridgeshire area to the north or the London area to the south. Nonetheless, Stortford is still warmer than the English average.

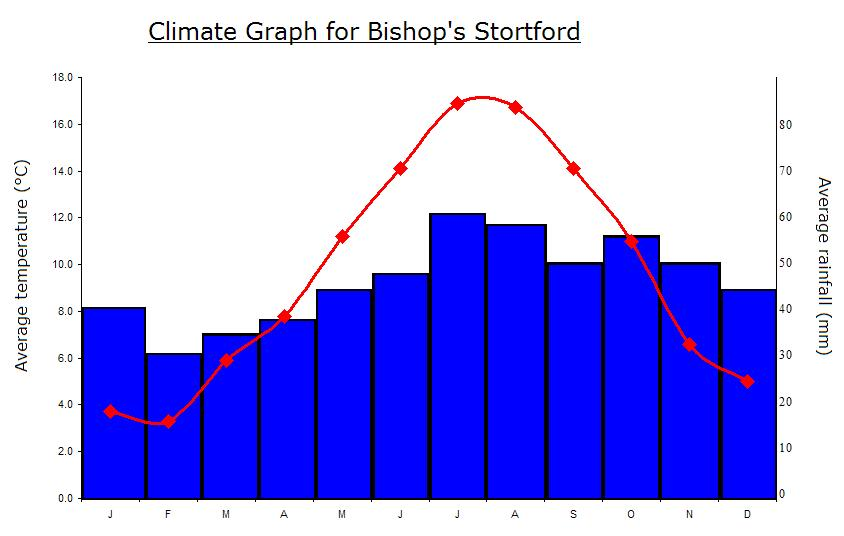
Climate graph of Bishop's Stortford

The highest temperature recorded at Stansted was 35.0 °C (95.0 °F) during the August 2003 heatwave. In an average year the hottest day should reach 28.8 °C (83.8 °F), and 12.3 days will record a temperature of 25.1 °C (77.2 °F) or more. The lowest temperature recorded at Stansted was −14.7 °C (5.5 °F) during December 1981. Notably cold minimum temperatures tend not to occur due to the lack of higher terrain meaning little cold air drainage occurs. The average annual coldest night should fall to −7.6 °C (18.3 °F), with 47.3 air frosts being recorded in an average year.

Typically, the Stortford area will receive an average of 622 mm of rain during the course of the year. 1 mm or more of rain will be recorded on 114.7 days of the year.

Temperature averages refer to the period 1971–2000, rainfall averages to 1961–1990.

Climate data for Stansted, elevation 101m, 1971–2000, Rainfall 1961–1990
Month	Jan	Feb	Mar	Apr	May	Jun	Jul	Aug	Sep	Oct	Nov	Dec	Year
Mean daily maximum °C (°F)	6.5 (43.7)	6.9 (44.4)	9.8 (49.6)	12.2 (54.0)	16.1 (61.0)	19.0 (66.2)	21.7 (71.1)	21.8 (71.2)	18.4 (65.1)	14.1 (57.4)	9.6 (49.3)	7.4 (45.3)	13.5 (56.3)
Mean daily minimum °C (°F)	0.9 (33.6)	0.7 (33.3)	2.4 (36.3)	3.8 (38.8)	6.8 (44.2)	9.7 (49.5)	12.0 (53.6)	12.0 (53.6)	9.9 (49.8)	7.0 (44.6)	3.4 (38.1)	1.9 (35.4)	5.9 (42.6)
Average precipitation mm (inches)	53.97 (2.12)	39.54 (1.56)	49.31 (1.94)	46.53 (1.83)	45.95 (1.81)	50.20 (1.98)	53.37 (2.10)	56.54 (2.23)	52.66 (2.07)	55.01 (2.17)	59.50 (2.34)	59.51 (2.34)	622.09 (24.49)
Source 1: YR.NO
Source 2: KNMI

== Arms ==
The urban district council was granted a coat of arms on 20 August 1952. The coat of arms was subsequently transferred to the new town council on local government reorganisation in 1974.

Coat of arms of Bishop's Stortford Town Council
Notes Originally granted to Bishop's Stortford Urban District Council on 20 August 1952. Crest On a wreath of the colours on a mount Vert the battlements of a tower Proper issuant therefrom a cross pommelled Gules. Escutcheon Vert on a pale Argent surmounted by a fess wavy of the last charged with a bar wavy Azure counterchanged on the pale a mitre and garb Proper. Motto Pro Deo Et Populo (For God And The People).
