= Parliamentary constituencies in Hertfordshire =

The county of Hertfordshire in relation to England

The county of Hertfordshire in England is divided into twelve (Note: Hitchin is a cross-county constituency, mostly covering areas of northern Hertfordshire but also containing electoral wards in Central Bedfordshire.) parliamentary constituencies. Each of the twelve elects a Member of Parliament (MP) to represent it at the United Kingdom (UK) Parliament in Westminster. As of the 2024 general election, seven of Hertfordshire's MPs are from the Labour Party, three are Conservatives, and two are Liberal Democrats. The county currently has one urban borough constituency (BC) – Watford - while the other eleven are classed as more rural county constituencies (CC).

== Constituencies ==
Context of the 2024 result. The county elected 7 Labour MPs, 3 Conservatives and 2 Liberal Democrats. Dem. MP.

Boundaries of the seats were amended by the 2023 review of Westminster constituencies carried out by the Boundary Commission for England, which came into effect from the 2024 general election. Each constituency is made up of whole or partial local government wards, which elect councillors at English local elections. Eleven are designated as county constituencies (in which candidates can spend more per head than their borough counterparts). One is a borough constituency.

Conservative † Labour ‡ Liberal Democrat ¤

Name (Note: BC denotes borough constituency, CC denotes county constituency.)	Electorate	Majority (Note: The majority is the number of votes the winning candidate receives more than their nearest rival.)	Member of Parliament	Nearest opposition	Map
Broxbourne CC	75,454	2,858	Lewis Cocking †	Catherine Deakin ‡	A fairly small constituency located in the south-east of the county.
Harpenden and Berkhamsted CC	71,635	10,708	Victoria Collins ¤	Nigel Gardner †	A medium-to-large-sized constituency, stretching from the west to the central areas of the county.
Hemel Hempstead CC	70,496	4,857	David Taylor ‡	Andrew Williams †	A medium-sized constituency located in the east of the county.
Hertford and Stortford CC	75,396	4,748	Josh Dean ‡	Julie Marson †	A small to medium-sized constituency. Long and thin in shape, it covers the eastern areas of the county.
Hertsmere CC	73,256	7,992	Oliver Dowden †	Josh Tapper ‡	A medium-sized constituency in the south of the constituency.
Hitchin CC	72,112	7,109	Alistair Strathern ‡	Bim Afolami †	A large cross-county constituency, covering northern parts of the county and also containing electoral wards in central Bedfordshire.
North East Hertfordshire CC	76,849	1,923	Chris Hinchliff ‡	Nikki da Costa †	The largest constituency in the county, located in the north and east. Its northernmost parts are considerably further north than constituencies in the west.
South West Hertfordshire CC	71,552	4,456	Gagan Mohindra †	Sally Symington ¤	A medium-sized constituency located in the south-west of the county.
St Albans CC	70,881	19,834	Daisy Cooper ¤	James Spencer †	A medium-sized constituency located in the south of the county. It is bordered exclusively by other constituencies in the county.
Stevenage CC	70,370	6,618	Kevin Bonavia ‡	Alex Clarkson †	A small constituency, located in the north of the county and entirely surrounded by other constituencies within the county.
Watford BC	70,576	4,723	Matt Turmaine ‡	Dean Russell †	A small constituency, southwest of the centre of the county.
Welwyn Hatfield CC	74,535	3,799	Andrew Lewin ‡	Grant Shapps †	A medium sized-constituency at the centre of the county. It is entirely bounded by other constituencies in the county.

== Boundary changes ==
=== 2024 ===
For the 2023 review of Westminster constituencies, which redrew the constituency map ahead of the 2024 United Kingdom general election, the Boundary Commission for England opted to combine Hertfordshire with Bedfordshire as a sub-region of the East of England region, with the creation of the cross-county boundary constituency of Hitchin. As a result, Hitchin and Harpenden was abolished, with Harpenden being included in a new constituency named Harpenden and Berkhamsted, along with the towns of Berkhamsted and Tring, previously part of South West Hertfordshire - which in turn gained areas of Three Rivers District, primarily form Watford. These changes had knock-on effects in the rest of the county, with most of the rest of the constituencies undergoing relatively minor boundary changes, the only exceptions being North East Hertfordshire and Stevenage, which remained effectively unchanged (save minor realignments with new ward boundaries).

Former name	Boundaries 2010-2024	Current name	Boundaries 2024–present
1. Broxbourne BC; 2. Hemel Hempstead CC; 3. Hertford and Stortford CC; 4. Hertsmere CC; 5. Hitchin and Harpenden CC; 6. North East Hertfordshire CC; 7. South West Hertfordshire CC; 8. St Albans CC; 9. Stevenage CC; 10. Watford BC; 11. Welwyn Hatfield CC	2010-2024 constituencies in Hertfordshire	1. Broxbourne CC; 2. Harpenden and Berkhamsted CC; 3. Hemel Hempstead CC; 4. Hertford and Stortford CC; 5. Hertsmere CC; 6. Hitchin CC; 7. North East Hertfordshire CC; 8. South West Hertfordshire CC; 9. St Albans CC; 10. Stevenage CC; 11. Watford BC; 12. Welwyn Hatfield CC	Current constituencies in Hertfordshire

=== 2010 ===
For the fifth periodic review of Westminster constituencies, which came into effect ahead of the 2010 general election, the Boundary Commission for England retained the same eleven Hertfordshire constituencies that had existed previously. It did however make slight boundary changes to reduce electoral disparity. The recommendations, which became law with the Parliamentary Constituencies (England) Order 2007, also ensured that local government wards in Hertfordshire would no longer be split between two Parliamentary constituencies.

	Name	Boundaries 1997-2010	Boundaries 2010–present
1	Broxbourne BC	A map of a county, divided into eleven constituencies	The same map of a county. It is divided into eleven constituencies, some of which have slightly different boundaries.
2	Hemel Hempstead CC	A map of a county, divided into eleven constituencies	The same map of a county. It is divided into eleven constituencies, some of which have slightly different boundaries.
3	Hertford and Stortford CC	A map of a county, divided into eleven constituencies	The same map of a county. It is divided into eleven constituencies, some of which have slightly different boundaries.
4	Hertsmere CC	A map of a county, divided into eleven constituencies	The same map of a county. It is divided into eleven constituencies, some of which have slightly different boundaries.
5	Hitchin and Harpenden CC	A map of a county, divided into eleven constituencies	The same map of a county. It is divided into eleven constituencies, some of which have slightly different boundaries.
6	North East Hertfordshire CC	A map of a county, divided into eleven constituencies	The same map of a county. It is divided into eleven constituencies, some of which have slightly different boundaries.
7	South West Hertfordshire CC	A map of a county, divided into eleven constituencies	The same map of a county. It is divided into eleven constituencies, some of which have slightly different boundaries.
8	St Albans CC	A map of a county, divided into eleven constituencies	The same map of a county. It is divided into eleven constituencies, some of which have slightly different boundaries.
9	Stevenage CC	A map of a county, divided into eleven constituencies	The same map of a county. It is divided into eleven constituencies, some of which have slightly different boundaries.
10	Watford BC	A map of a county, divided into eleven constituencies	The same map of a county. It is divided into eleven constituencies, some of which have slightly different boundaries.
11	Welwyn Hatfield CC	A map of a county, divided into eleven constituencies	The same map of a county. It is divided into eleven constituencies, some of which have slightly different boundaries.

== Results history ==
Primary data source: House of Commons research briefing - General election results from 1918 to 2019

=== 2024 ===
The number of votes cast for each political party who fielded candidates in constituencies comprising Hertfordshire in the 2024 general election were as follows:

Party	Votes	%	Change from 2019	Seats	Change from 2019
Labour	177,658	30.5%	▲7.0%	7	▲7
Conservative	177,264	30.4%	▼22.3%	3	▼7
Liberal Democrats	108,704	18.6%	▲0.3%	2	▲1
Reform UK	80,967	13.9%	New	0	New
Green	33,850	5.8%	▲3.3%	0	0
Others	5,492	0.8%	▼2.2%	0	0
Total	583,127	100.0		12	

=== Percentage votes ===
Election year	1974 (Feb)	1974 (Oct)	1979	1983	1987	1992	1997	2001	2005	2010	2015	2017	2019	2024
Labour	35.0	38.5	34.4	19.0	19.8	25.5	39.7	38.9	30.2	19.0	22.4	32.1	23.5	30.5
Conservative	40.4	41.3	51.1	50.3	52.0	53.3	40.6	41.8	44.8	50.4	52.6	54.3	52.7	30.4
Liberal Democrat^{1}	24.4	19.8	13.2	30.2	27.8	20.3	16.0	16.9	21.4	24.0	8.7	9.9	18.3	18.6
Reform UK	-	-	-	-	-	-	-	-	-	-	-	-	-	13.9
Green Party	-	-	-	-	*	*	*	*	*	0.8	3.6	2.3	2.5	5.8
UKIP	-	-	-	-	-	-	*	*	*	3.3	12.5	1.2	*	*
Other	0.2	0.4	1.3	0.5	0.4	0.9	3.7	2.4	3.6	2.5	0.2	0.2	3.0	0.8

^{1}1974 & 1979 - Liberal Party; 1983 & 1987 - SDP–Liberal Alliance

* Included in Other

=== Seats ===
Election year	1974 (Feb)	1974 (Oct)	1979	1983	1987	1992	1997	2001	2005	2010	2015	2017	2019	2024
Labour	2	4	0	0	0	0	5	5	2	0	0	0	0	7 (Note: Includes the constituency of Hitchin, which also lies partly in Bedfordshire.)
Conservative	7	5	9	10	10	10	6	6	9	11	11	11	10	3
Liberal Democrat^{1}	0	0	0	0	0	0	0	0	0	0	0	0	1	2
Total	9	9	9	10	10	10	11	11	11	11	11	11	11	12

^{1}1974 & 1979 - Liberal Party; 1983 & 1987 - SDP–Liberal Alliance

=== Maps ===
==== 1885-1910 ====
1885

1886

1892

1895

1900

1906

Jan 1910

Dec 1910

==== 1918-1945 ====
1918

1922

1923

1924

1929

1931

1935

1945

==== 1950-1970 ====
1950

1951

1955

1959

1964

1966

1970

==== 1974-present ====
Feb 1974

Oct 1974

1979

1983

1987

1992

1997

2001

2005

2010

2015

2017

2019

2024

== Timeline ==
Former constituency
* Constituency for the 2024 United Kingdom general election

Constituency	Years												
Constituency	1290–1298	1298–1307	1307–1852	1852–1885	1885–1918	1918–1945	1945–1950	1950–1955	1955–1974	1974–1983	1983–1997	1997–2024	2024-present*
Hertfordshire	1290–1885												
Hertford		1298–1974											
St Albans (Note: St Albans was abolished in 1852, but re-established in 1885.)			1307–1852		1885–*								
Watford					1885–*								
Hitchin					1885–1983								2024–*
Hemel Hempstead						1918–1983						1997–*	
Barnet							1945–1974			Transferred to Greater London			
South West Hertfordshire								1950–*					
East Hertfordshire									1955–1983				
Hertford and Stevenage										1974–1983			
South Hertfordshire										1974–1983			
Welwyn Hatfield										1974–*			
North Hertfordshire											1983–1997		
West Hertfordshire											1983–1997		
Broxbourne											1983–*		
Hertford and Stortford											1983–*		
Hertsmere											1983–*		
Stevenage											1983–*		
Hitchin and Harpenden												1997–2024	
North East Hertfordshire												1997–*	
Harpenden and Berkhamsted													2024–*

== Historical representation by party ==
A cell marked → (with a different colour background to the preceding cell) indicates that the previous MP continued to sit under a new party name.

=== 1885 to 1918 ===
Conservative Independent Liberal

Constituency	1885	1886	1892	1895	98	1900	04	1906	Jan 10	Dec 10	11	16
Hertford	A. Smith				E. Cecil	A. H. Smith			Rolleston			Billing
Hitchin	Dimsdale		Hudson					Bertram	Hillier		R. Cecil	
St Albans	J. W. Grimston		Gibbs				Slack	Carlile				
Watford	Halsey							Micklem	Ward			

=== 1918 to 1955 ===
Anti-Waste League Conservative Independent Labour Liberal Silver Badge

Constituency	1918	19	20	21	1922	1923	1924	1929	1931	33	1935	37	41	43	1945	1950	1951
Hertford	Billing			Sueter	→										Walker-Smith		
Hitchin	R. Cecil					Kindersley			Knebworth	Wilson			Berry		Jones	Fisher	
St Albans	Carlile	Fremantle												J. Grimston	Dumpleton	J. Grimston	
Watford	Herbert														Freeman		
Hemel Hempstead	Talbot		J. Davidson			Dunn	J. Davidson					F. Davidson					
Barnet															Taylor	Maudling	
Hertfordshire SW																Longden	

=== 1955 to 1983 ===
Conservative Labour

Constituency	1955	1959	1964	1966	1970	Feb 1974	Oct 1974	1979	79
Barnet	Maudling					Transferred to Greater London			
Hemel Hempstead	Davidson	Allason					Corbett	Lyell	
Hertford / Hertford & Stevenage (1974)	Lindsay					Williams		Wells	
Hitchin	Maddan		Williams			Stewart			
St Albans	Grimston	Goodhew							
Watford	Farey-Jones		Tuck					Garel-Jones	
Hertfordshire SW	Longden					Dodsworth			Page
Hertfordshire East	Walker-Smith								
Hertfordshire South						Parkinson			
Welwyn and Hatfield						Lindsay	Hayman	Murphy	

=== 1983 to present ===
Conservative Independent Labour Liberal Democrats

Constituency	1983	1987	1992	1997	2001	2005	2010	2015	2017	19	2019	2024
Broxbourne	Roe					Walker						Cocking
Harpenden and Berkhamsted												Collins
West Herts / Hemel Hempstead (1997)	Jones			McWalter		Penning						Taylor
Hertford & Stortford	Wells				Prisk						Marson	Dean
North Herts / NE Herts (1997)	Stewart		Heald									Hinchliff
Hertfordshire SW	Page					Gauke				→	Mohindra	
Hertsmere	Parkinson		Clappison					Dowden				
Hitchin & Harpenden / Hitchin (2024)^{1}				Lilley					Afolami			Strathern
St Albans	Lilley			Pollard		Main					Cooper	
Stevenage	Wood			Follett			McPartland					Bonavia
Watford	Garel-Jones			Ward			Harrington				Russell	Turmaine
Welwyn and Hatfield	Murphy	Evans		Johnson		Shapps						Lewin

^{1}includes an area of Bedfordshire

== See also ==
- List of parliamentary constituencies in the East of England (region)
- History of parliamentary constituencies and boundaries in Hertfordshire
- East of England (European Parliament constituency)
- Hertfordshire County Council
- Hertfordshire local elections
