= History of parliamentary constituencies and boundaries in Hertfordshire =

The ceremonial county of Hertfordshire has returned 12 MPs to the UK Parliament since 2024.

Hertfordshire has been represented in Parliament since 1290. The number of MPs and the parts represented have changed considerably over time. In 1885 there were just four seats and this has increased by one at each major redistribution which came into effect for the general elections of 1918, 1945, 1950, 1955, February 1974, 1983, 1997 and 2024.

As a result of the creation of Greater London under the London Government Act 1963, which came into effect on 1 April 1965, the boundaries of the historic/administrative county were altered, with Barnet being created as a Metropolitan Borough within Greater London and the more rural area of Potters Bar being transferred from the abolished county of Middlesex. This was reflected in the following redistribution of parliamentary seats which came into effect for the February 1974 general election and effectively reduced the county's representation by 1 MP.

== Number of seats ==
The table below shows the number of MPs representing Hertfordshire at each major redistribution of seats affecting the county.

Year	County seats (Note: Prior to 1950, seats were classified as county divisions or parliamentary boroughs. Since 1950, they have been classified as county or borough constituencies.)	Borough seats	Total
Prior to 1832	2	4	6
1832–1852	3	4	7
1852–1868 (Note: Borough of St Albans (2 seats) disenfranchised for corruption.)	3	2	5
1868–1885	3	1	4
1885–1918	4	0	4
1918–1945	5	0	5
1945–1950	6	0	6
1950–1955	6	1	7
1955–1974	7	1	8
1974–1983	8	1	9
1983–1997	8	2	10
1997–2024	9	2	11
2024-present	11	1	12

== Timeline ==
County seat Borough seat

Constituency	Prior to 1832	1832–1852	1852–1868	1868–1885	1885–1918	1918–1945	1945–1950	1950–1955	1955–1974	1974–1983	1983–1997	1997–2024	2024–present
Hertfordshire	1290–1832 (2 MPs)	1832–1885 (3 MPs)											
Hertford	1298–1868 (2 MPs)			1868–1885	1885–1974								
East Hertfordshire									1955–1983				
Hertford and Stevenage										1974–1983			
Stevenage											1983–present		
Hertford and Stortford											1983–present		
Broxbourne											1983–2024		2024–present
Hitchin ^{1}					1885–1983								2024–present
North Hertfordshire											1983–1997		
North East Hertfordshire												1997–present	
Hitchin and Harpenden												1997–2024	
Harpenden and Berkhamsted													2024–present
St Albans	1307–1852 (2 MPs)				1885–present								
Barnet							1945–1974			Transferred to Greater London			
Welwyn Hatfield										1974–present			
South Hertfordshire										1974–1983			
Hertsmere											1983–present		
Watford					1885–1950			1950–present					
Hemel Hempstead						1918–1983						1997–present	
West Hertfordshire											1983–1997		
South West Hertfordshire								1950–present					

^{1} From 2024, Hitchin is a cross-county constituency, covering parts of North Hertfordshire and Central Bedfordshire.

== Boundary reviews ==
Prior to 1885	Hertfordshire was first represented in the English parliament in the thirteenth century, during the reign of King Edward I. Edward held a meeting of Parliament in the county in 1295. By 1307, the county's representation in parliament consisted of two representatives, known as knights of the shire, who represented the county as a whole. In addition, the city of St Albans and borough of Hertford elected two representatives of their own. Parliament's role evolved over the next five centuries, from a body existing primarily to advise the monarch on taxation, into a legislative body in its own right following the English Civil War. However, Hertfordshire's constituency makeup within it remained unchanged until 1832, when the county's representation was increased to three MPs by the Reform Act 1832. In 1852, St Albans was disenfranchised for electoral corruption and, under the Representation of the People Act 1867, the representation of the Borough of Hertford was reduced to one MP.	
1885	Under the Redistribution of Seats Act 1885, the county was divided into four single-member constituencies, namely the Eastern of Hertford Division (which absorbed the abolished Parliamentary Borough of Hertford), the Northern or Hitchin Division, the Mid or St Albans Division and the Western or Watford Division.	Hertfordshire 1885–1918
1918	Under the Representation of the People Act 1918, the county division of Hemel Hempstead was created. This was largely formed from the northern half of the Watford Division, incorporating Hemel Hempstead, Berkhamsted and Tring, and also included Harpenden and north-western areas of the St Albans Division.	Hertfordshire 1918–1945
1945	The House of Commons (Redistribution of Seats) Act 1944 set up boundaries commissions to carry out periodic reviews of the distribution of parliamentary constituencies. It also authorised an initial review to subdivide abnormally large constituencies (those exceeding an electorate of 100,000) in time for the 1945 election. As a consequence, the new seat of Barnet was formed from the St Albans constituency, comprising the urban districts of Barnet and East Barnet, and the Rural District of Elstree. There were other minor changes to align boundaries with those of local authorities and parishes.	Hertfordshire 1945–1950
1950	The Representation of the People Act 1948 increased the county's representation once again, from 6 to 7 MPs, with the creation of South West Hertfordshire, which was formed from the old Watford constituency, excluding the part comprising the Municipal Borough of Watford (which formed the redesignated Borough Constituency of Watford). The new seat also included the parish of Abbots Langley, transferred from Hemel Hempstead. Elsewhere, the Rural District of Welwyn was transferred from Hitchin to St Albans, the Rural District of Hatfield from St Albans to Barnet and the parish of Wheathampstead from Hemel Hempstead to St Albans.	Hertfordshire 1950–1955
1955	The First Periodic Review of Westminster constituencies resulted in the creation of East Hertfordshire from the bulk of the Hertford constituency, with a small rural area transferred from Hitchin. Hertford saw significant changes with only the municipal borough and the part of the Rural District of Hertford retained. The Urban District of Welwyn Garden City and the Rural District of Welwyn were transferred from St Albans; the Rural District of Hatfield was transferred from Barnet; and the remainder of the Rural District of Hertford was transferred from Hitchin.	Hertfordshire 1955–1974
1974	The next national boundary change came into effect for the February 1974 election following the recommendations of the Second Periodic Review and saw significant changes affecting Hertfordshire, partly reflecting the changes to the county's boundaries following the creation of the county of Greater London nine years earlier in 1965. Three new constituencies were introduced, offset by the abolition of two. Only Watford remained unchanged. Barnet was abolished as the Urban Districts of Barnet and East Barnet had been incorporated into the London Borough of Barnet and now formed the basis for the constituency of Chipping Barnet in Greater London. The new constituency of South Hertfordshire was made up as follows: The Rural District of Elstree, previously part of the Barnet constituency; the Urban District of Potters Bar which had been transferred from Middlesex to Hertfordshire following the creation of Greater London and was now transferred from the abolished constituency of Enfield West; the parish of Aldenham in the Rural District of Watford, transferred from South West Hertfordshire; and; the parishes of Colney Heath, London Colney and St Stephen in the Rural District of St Albans, transferred from the St Albans constituency.; To compensate St Albans, Harpenden and Redbourn were transferred from Hemel Hempstead. The new constituency of Hertford and Stevenage comprised the following: the Urban District of Stevenage (forming the majority of the new constituency), transferred from Hitchin; the Urban District of Ware, transferred from East Hertfordshire; and; the Municipal Borough and Rural District of Hertford, previously part of the abolished constituency of Hertford.; The remaining parts of the old Hertford constituency formed the new seat of Welwyn and Hatfield.	Hertfordshire 1974–1983
1983	The Third Review reflected the 1974 local government reorganisation arising from the Local Government Act 1972 and resulted in another significant redistribution, resulting in the formation of Broxbourne, Hertford and Stortford, Hertsmere, North Hertfordshire, Stevenage and West Hertfordshire, replacing the abolished constituencies of East Hertfordshire, Hemel Hempstead, Hertford and Stevenage, Hitchin and South Hertfordshire – a net increase of one seat. Broxbourne was formed as a Borough Constituency, primarily from southern parts of East Hertfordshire, consisting of the former Urban Districts of Cheshunt and Hoddesdon which had been combined to form the District of Broxbourne under the local government reorganisation. The rest of East Hertfordshire, including Bishop's Stortford and Sawbridgeworth, together with Hertford and Ware from the old Hertford and Stevenage seat, formed the new constituency of Hertford and Stortford. Stevenage was created as a separate constituency. Other changes: Hitchin replaced by North Hertfordshire, with a small part in the south-east being included in Stevenage (Codicote and Knebworth); Hemel Hempstead largely replaced by West Hertfordshire, with Berkhamsted being transferred to South West Hertfordshire; South Hertfordshire largely replaced by Hertsmere, with Colney Heath being transferred back to St Albans and St Stephens transferred to Watford; Bushey and Abbots Langley transferred from South West Hertfordshire to Hertsmere and Watford respectively;and; Wheathampstead transferred from St Albans to Welwyn and Hatfield (renamed Welwyn Hatfield), which in turn transferred Northaw to Broxbourne.	Hertfordshire 1983–1997
1997	The Fourth Review saw another increase in the number of constituencies, with the creation of Hitchin and Harpenden and North East Hertfordshire and the re-establishment of Hemel Hempstead, replacing the abolished constituencies North Hertfordshire and West Hertfordshire. Hitchin and Harpenden combined the two towns of Hitchin, previously part of North Hertfordshire, and Harpenden, transferred from St Albans. The remainder of North Hertfordshire (including Letchworth, Baldock and Royston), together with some rural areas of Hertford and Stortford and Stevenage, formed the new constituency of North East Hertfordshire. Hemel Hempstead was reformed from West Hertfordshire, with Tring being transferred to South West Hertfordshire. To compensate for the loss of Harpenden, St Albans gained St Stephens and Park Street, Bedmond, and London Colney from Watford, South West Hertfordshire and Hertsmere respectively. Other movements included the transfers of: Stanstead Abbotts and Great Amwell from Broxbourne to Hertford and Stortford; Kings Langley from South West Hertfordshire to Hemel Hempstead; Wheathampstead from Welwyn Hatfield to Hitchin and Harpenden; and; three District of Three Rivers wards from South West Hertfordshire to Watford.	Hertfordshire 1997-2010
2010	At the Fifth Review, the Boundary Commission for England decided not to change Hertfordshire's representation. There were marginal changes to boundaries due primarily to the revision of local authority ward boundaries.	Hertfordshire 2010-2024
2024	For the 2023 Periodic Review of Westminster constituencies, which redrew the constituency map ahead of the 2024 United Kingdom general election, the Boundary Commission for England opted to combine Hertfordshire with Bedfordshire as a sub-region of the East of England region, with the creation of the cross-county boundary constituency of Hitchin. As a result, Hitchin and Harpenden was abolished, with Harpenden being included in a new constituency named Harpenden and Berkhamsted, along with the towns of Berkhamsted and Tring, previously part of South West Hertfordshire - which in turn gained areas of Three Rivers District, primarily form Watford. These changes had knock-on effects in the rest of the county, with most of the rest of the constituencies undergoing relatively minor boundary changes, the only exceptions being North East Hertfordshire and Stevenage, which remained effectively unchanged (save minor realignments with new ward boundaries).	Hertfordshire 2024–present

== See also ==
- List of parliamentary constituencies in Hertfordshire
