= Electoral history of Grant Shapps =

List of elections featuring Grant Shapps as a candidate

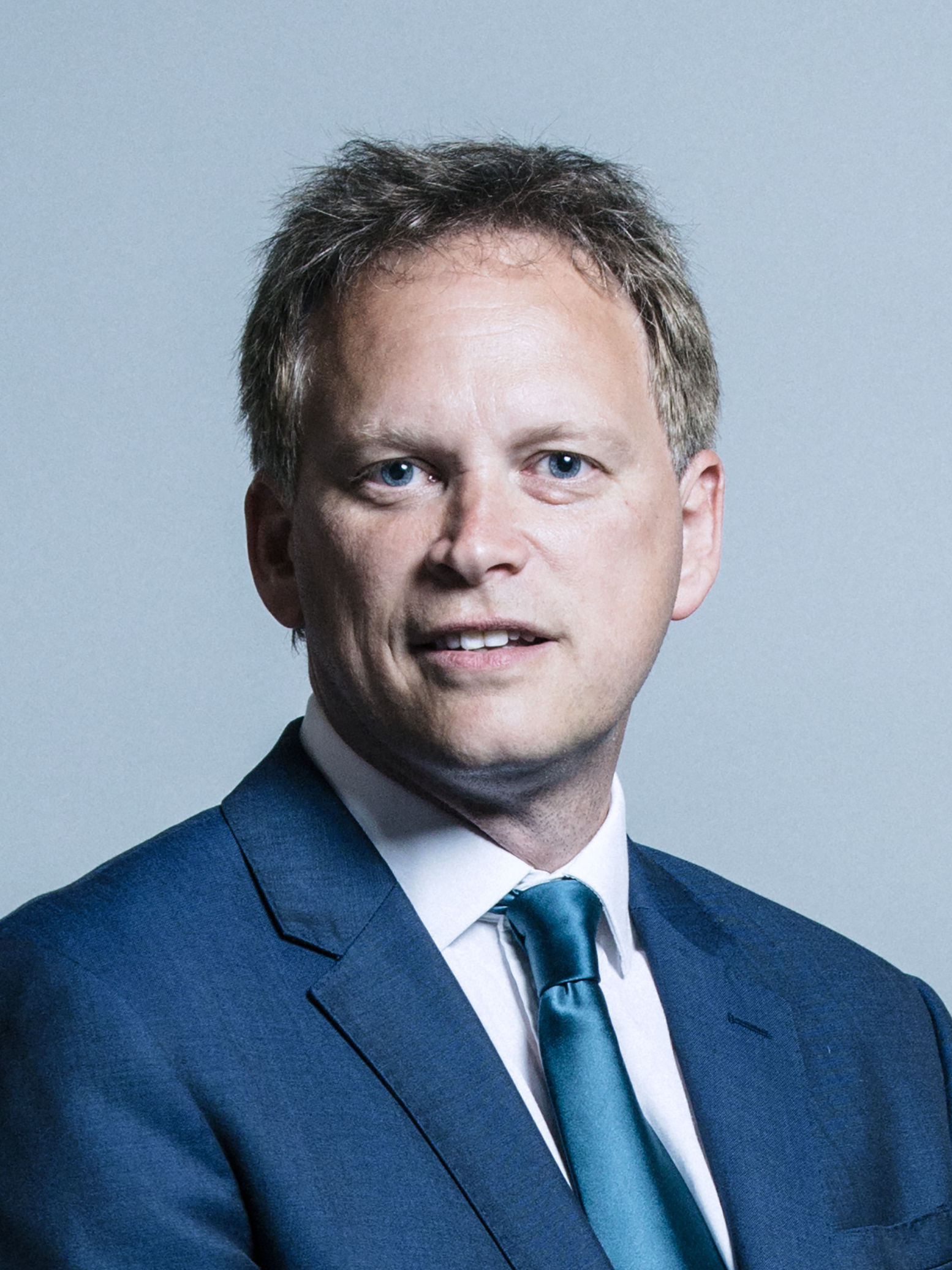
Official portrait, 2017

This is a summary of the electoral history of Grant Shapps, who was a prominent Conservative Party politician who served as a Cabinet minister under David Cameron, Boris Johnson, Liz Truss and Rishi Sunak, and was a Member of Parliament from 2005 to 2024.

== Council elections ==
=== 1990 Manchester City Council election, Old Moat ===
Old Moat
Party	Candidate	Votes	%	±%
Labour	A. Fender*	2,963	56.3	+11.4
Conservative	G. Shapps	1,218	23.1	+1.5
Liberal Democrats	S. A. Oliver	602	11.4	−11.5
Green	J. V. Lovell	479	9.1	+4.0
Majority		1,745	33.2	+11.2
Turnout		5,262		
Labour hold		Swing	+4.9	

=== 1994 Brent London Borough Council election, St Andrews ===
St Andrews (2)
Party	Candidate	Votes	%	±%
Labour	Richard Harrod*	1,119	49.95	▼0.07
Labour	Bruce Nichols	1,033		
Conservative	Maurice Hearn	969	44.20	▲1.88
Conservative	Grant Shapps	935		
Liberal Democrats	Margaret Calder	134	5.85	▼1.81
Liberal Democrats	Adrian Wilkins	118		
Registered electors		4,395		▼863
Turnout		2,278	51.83	▲12.42
Rejected ballots		8	0.35	▼0.04
Labour hold				
Labour hold				

== Parliamentary elections ==
=== 1997 general election ===
General election 1997: North Southwark and Bermondsey
Party	Candidate	Votes	%	±%
Liberal Democrats	Simon Hughes	19,831	48.6	−2.8
Labour	Jeremy Fraser	16,444	40.3	+5.8
Conservative	Grant Shapps	2,835	6.9	−5.0
BNP	Michael Davidson	713	1.7	+0.5
Referendum	Bill Newton	545	1.3	New
Communist League	Ian Grant	175	0.4	New
Liberal	James Munday	157	0.4	New
National Democrats	Ingga Yngvisson	95	0.2	New
Majority		3,387	8.3	–8.6
Turnout		40,795	62.2	–0.3
Registered electors		65,598		
Liberal Democrats hold		Swing	–4.3	

=== 2001 general election ===
General election 2001: Welwyn Hatfield
Party	Candidate	Votes	%	±%
Labour	Melanie Johnson	18,484	43.2	−3.9
Conservative	Grant Shapps	17,288	40.4	+3.9
Liberal Democrats	Daniel Cooke	6,021	14.1	+0.6
UKIP	Malcolm Biggs	798	1.9	New
ProLife Alliance	Fiona Pinto	230	0.5	0.0
Majority		1,196	2.8	−7.8
Turnout		42,821	63.9	−14.7
Labour hold		Swing	−3.9	

=== 2005 general election ===
General election 2005: Welwyn Hatfield
Party	Candidate	Votes	%	±%
Conservative	Grant Shapps	22,172	49.6	+9.2
Labour	Melanie Johnson	16,226	36.3	−6.9
Liberal Democrats	Sara Bedford	6,318	14.1	0.0
Majority		5,946	13.3	N/A
Turnout		44,716	68.1	+4.2
Conservative gain from Labour		Swing	+8.0	

=== 2010 general election ===
General election 2010: Welwyn Hatfield
Party	Candidate	Votes	%	±%
Conservative	Grant Shapps	27,894	57.0	+7.4
Labour	Mike Hobday	10,471	21.4	−14.9
Liberal Democrats	Paul Zukowskyj	8,010	16.4	+2.2
UKIP	David Platt	1,643	3.4	New
Green	Jill Weston	796	1.6	New
Independent	Nigel Parker	158	0.3	New
Majority		17,423	35.6	+22.3
Turnout		48,972	68.0	−0.2
Conservative hold		Swing	+11.1	

=== 2015 general election ===
General election 2015: Welwyn Hatfield
Party	Candidate	Votes	%	±%
Conservative	Grant Shapps	25,281	50.4	−6.6
Labour	Anawar Miah	13,128	26.1	+4.7
UKIP	Arthur Stevens	6,556	13.1	+9.7
Liberal Democrats	Hugh Annand	3,140	6.3	−10.1
Green	Marc Scheimann	1,742	3.5	+1.9
Independent	Michael Green	216	0.4	New
TUSC	Richard Shattock	142	0.3	New
Majority		12,153	24.3	−11.3
Turnout		50,205	68.5	+0.5
Conservative hold		Swing	−5.7	

=== 2017 general election ===
General election 2017: Welwyn Hatfield
Party	Candidate	Votes	%	±%
Conservative	Grant Shapps	26,374	51.0	+0.6
Labour	Anawar Miah	19,005	36.8	+10.7
Liberal Democrats	Nigel Quinton	3,836	7.4	+1.1
UKIP	Dean Milliken	1,441	2.8	–10.3
Green	Christianne Sayers	835	1.6	–1.9
Independent	Melvyn Jones	178	0.3	New
Majority		7,369	14.2	–10.1
Turnout		51,669	71.0	+2.5
Conservative hold		Swing	−5.0	

=== 2019 general election ===
General election 2019: Welwyn Hatfield
Party	Candidate	Votes	%	±%
Conservative	Grant Shapps	27,394	52.6	+1.6
Labour	Rosie Newbigging	16,439	31.6	−5.2
Liberal Democrats	Paul Zukowskyj	6,602	12.7	+5.3
Green	Oliver Sayers	1,618	3.1	+1.5
Majority		10,955	21.0	+6.8
Turnout		52,053	69.5	−1.5
Conservative hold		Swing	+3.4	

=== 2024 general election ===
General election 2024: Welwyn Hatfield
Party	Candidate	Votes	%	±%
Labour	Andrew Lewin	19,877	41.0	+9.3
Conservative	Grant Shapps	16,078	33.2	−19.3
Reform	Jack Aaron	6,397	13.2	New
Liberal Democrats	John Munro	3,117	6.4	−6.3
Green	Sarah Butcher	2,986	6.2	+3.1
Majority		3,799	7.8	N/A
Turnout		48,455	64.6	−4.9
Labour gain from Conservative		Swing	+14.4	
