= Minister of State for Housing and Planning (United Kingdom) =

Junior ministerial office of the British government

United Kingdom Minister of State for Housing and Planning
- Royal Arms of His Majesty's Government

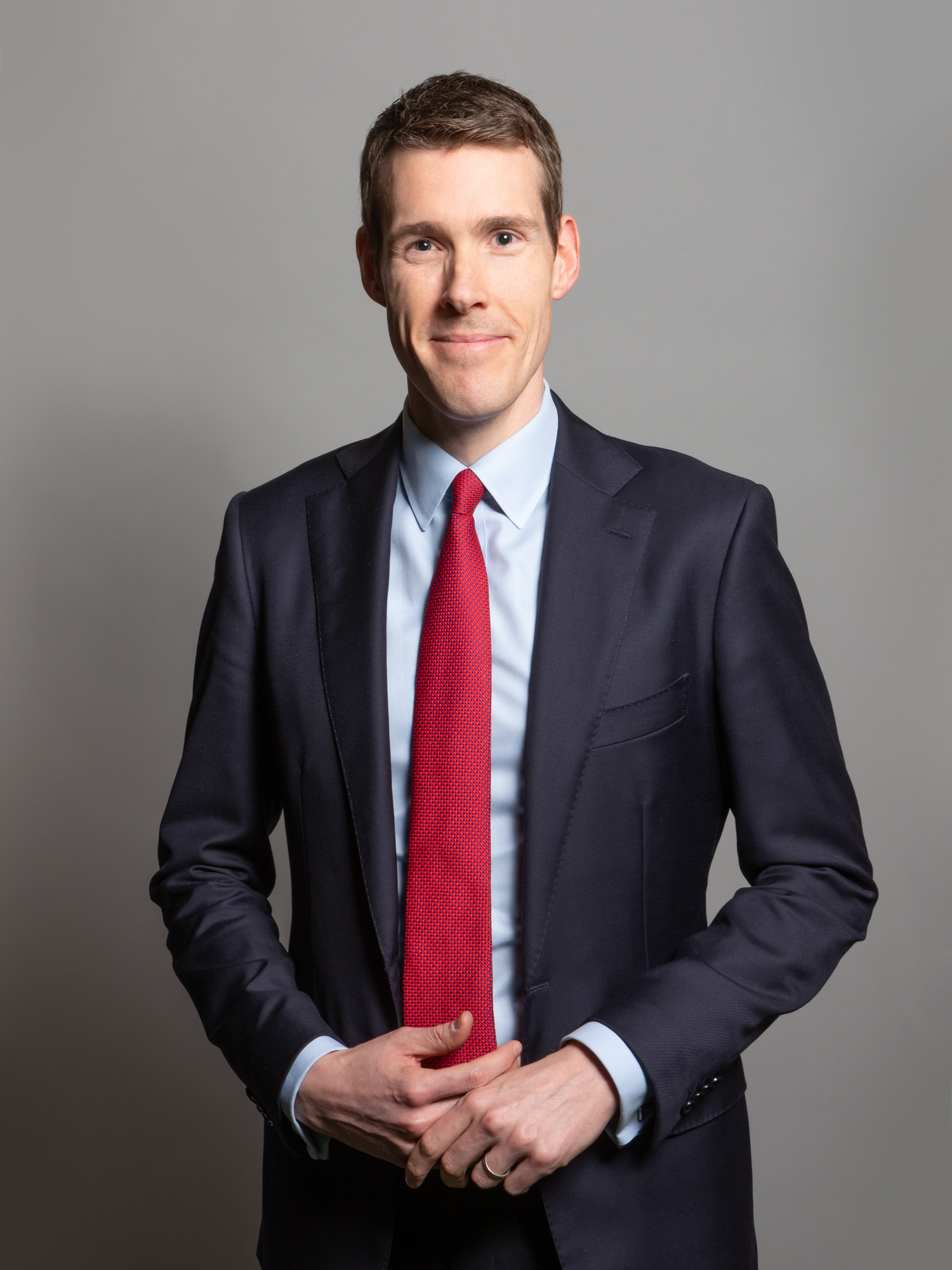
- Incumbent; Matthew Pennycook since 6 July 2024
- Ministry of Housing, Communities and Local Government
- Style: Minister
- Nominator: Prime Minister of the United Kingdom
- Appointer: The Monarch; on advice of the Prime Minister
- Term length: At His Majesty's pleasure
- Website: www.gov.uk/government/ministers/minister-of-state--63

The Minister of State for Housing and Planning is a mid-level position in the Ministry of Housing, Communities and Local Government in the British government. The position has been held by Matthew Pennycook since 6 July 2024.

The position was formerly known as the Minister for Housing, Planning and Regeneration; Minister of State for Housing and Planning; and the Minister of State for Housing and Local Government

== History ==
The office was known as Minister for Planning and Local Government in the Labour government, 1974–1979.

The office was known as Minister for Housing and Construction in the Heath ministry.

Between 1994 and 1997, the Minister of State for Construction, Planning and Energy Efficiency was a role in the Department of the Environment, and was held by West Hertfordshire MP Robert Jones.

== Responsibilities ==
The minister has the following responsibilities:

- Housing policy
- Home ownership
- Housing strategy
- Housing delivery
- Homes England Stewardship
- Affordable Housing Programme
- Design and Building Better
- Planning reform
- Commons Minister on Building Safety
- Winter preparedness (Transition and Covid, including Deputy at XO and Covid-O)
- Project Speed
- Ox-Cam
- Homebuying and selling
- Voluntary Right to Buy
- Private Rented Sector
- Planning casework

== List of ministers ==
Name	Portrait	Entered office	Left office	Political party	Ministry	Secretary of State
Minister of State for Local Government and Development
Graham Page		Before 1974	Before 1974	Conservative	Heath	Peter Walker
Minister of State for Local Government and Planning
John Silkin		7 March 1974	10 September 1976	Labour	Wilson III & IV; Callaghan	Anthony Crosland; Peter Shore
Office not in use (1976–79)
Minister of State for Housing
John Stanley		7 May 1979	13 June 1983	Conservative	Thatcher I	Michael Heseltine; Tom King
Ian Gow		13 June 1983	2 September 1985	Conservative	Thatcher II	Patrick Jenkin
John Patten		2 September 1985	13 June 1987	Conservative	Thatcher II	Kenneth Baker; Nicholas Ridley
William Waldegrave		13 June 1987	25 July 1988	Conservative	Thatcher III	Nicholas Ridley
Malcolm Sinclair, 20th Earl of Caithness		25 July 1988	25 July 1989	Conservative	Thatcher III	Nicholas Ridley
Michael Howard		25 July 1989	3 January 1990	Conservative	Thatcher III	Chris Patten
Michael Spicer		3 January 1990	28 November 1990	Conservative	Thatcher III	Chris Patten
George Young		28 November 1990	11 July 1994	Conservative	Major I & II	Michael Heseltine; Michael Howard; John Gummer
Nicholas Lowther, 2nd Viscount Ullswater		20 July 1994	6 July 1995	Conservative	Major II	John Gummer
Minister of State for Construction, Planning and Energy Efficiency
Robert Jones		6 July 1995	2 May 1997	Conservative	Major II	John Gummer
Minister of State for Housing and Planning
Hilary Armstrong		2 May 1997	29 July 1999	Labour	Blair I	John Prescott
Nick Raynsford		29 July 1999	7 June 2001	Labour	Blair I	John Prescott
Minister of State for Housing, Planning and Regeneration
Charlie Falconer, Baron Falconer of Thoroton		11 June 2001	29 May 2002	Labour	Blair II	Stephen Byers
Minister of State for Housing and Planning
The Lord Rooker		29 May 2002	13 June 2003	Labour	Blair II	John Prescott
Keith Hill		13 June 2003	6 May 2005	Labour	Blair II	John Prescott
Yvette Cooper (attended cabinet from June 2007)		10 May 2005	24 January 2008	Labour	Blair III; Brown	Ruth Kelly; Hazel Blears
Caroline Flint (attended cabinet)		24 January 2008	3 October 2008	Labour	Brown	Hazel Blears
Margaret Beckett (attended cabinet)		3 October 2008	5 June 2009	Labour	Brown	Hazel Blears
John Healey (attended cabinet)		5 June 2009	11 May 2010	Labour	Brown	John Denham
Minister of State for Housing and Local Government
Grant Shapps		13 May 2010	4 September 2012	Conservative	Cameron–Clegg	Eric Pickles
Mark Prisk		4 September 2012	7 October 2013	Conservative	Cameron–Clegg	Eric Pickles
Kris Hopkins		7 October 2013	15 July 2014	Conservative	Cameron–Clegg	Eric Pickles
Minister of State for Housing and Planning
Brandon Lewis		15 July 2014	16 July 2016	Conservative	Cameron–Clegg; Cameron II	Eric Pickles; Greg Clark
Minister of State for Housing
Gavin Barwell		17 July 2016	9 June 2017	Conservative	May I	Sajid Javid
Alok Sharma		14 June 2017	9 January 2018	Conservative	May II	Sajid Javid
Minister of State for Housing and Planning
Dominic Raab		9 January 2018	9 July 2018	Conservative	May II	Sajid Javid
Kit Malthouse		9 July 2018	25 July 2019	Conservative	May II	James Brokenshire
Esther McVey		24 July 2019	13 February 2020	Conservative	Johnson I	Robert Jenrick
Minister of State for Housing
Christopher Pincher		13 February 2020	8 February 2022	Conservative	Johnson II	Robert Jenrick; Michael Gove
Stuart Andrew		8 February 2022	6 July 2022	Conservative	Johnson II	Michael Gove
Marcus Jones		8 July 2022	7 September 2022	Conservative	Johnson II	Greg Clark
Parliamentary Under-Secretary of State for Housing
Lee Rowley		8 September 2022	26 October 2022	Conservative	Truss	Simon Clarke
Minister of State for Housing and Planning
Lucy Frazer		26 October 2022	7 February 2023	Conservative	Sunak	Michael Gove
Rachel Maclean		7 February 2023	13 November 2023	Conservative	Sunak	Michael Gove
Minister of State for Housing, Planning and Building Safety
Lee Rowley		13 November 2024	5 July 2024	Conservative	Sunak	Michael Gove
Minister of State for Housing and Planning
Matthew Pennycook (attending cabinet from July 2026)		6 July 2024	Incumbent	Labour	Sunak; Burnham	Angela Rayner; Steve Reed; Angela Rayner
