= Lindsay Northover, Baroness Northover =

British academic and Liberal Democrat politician

The Right Honourable The Baroness Northover PC
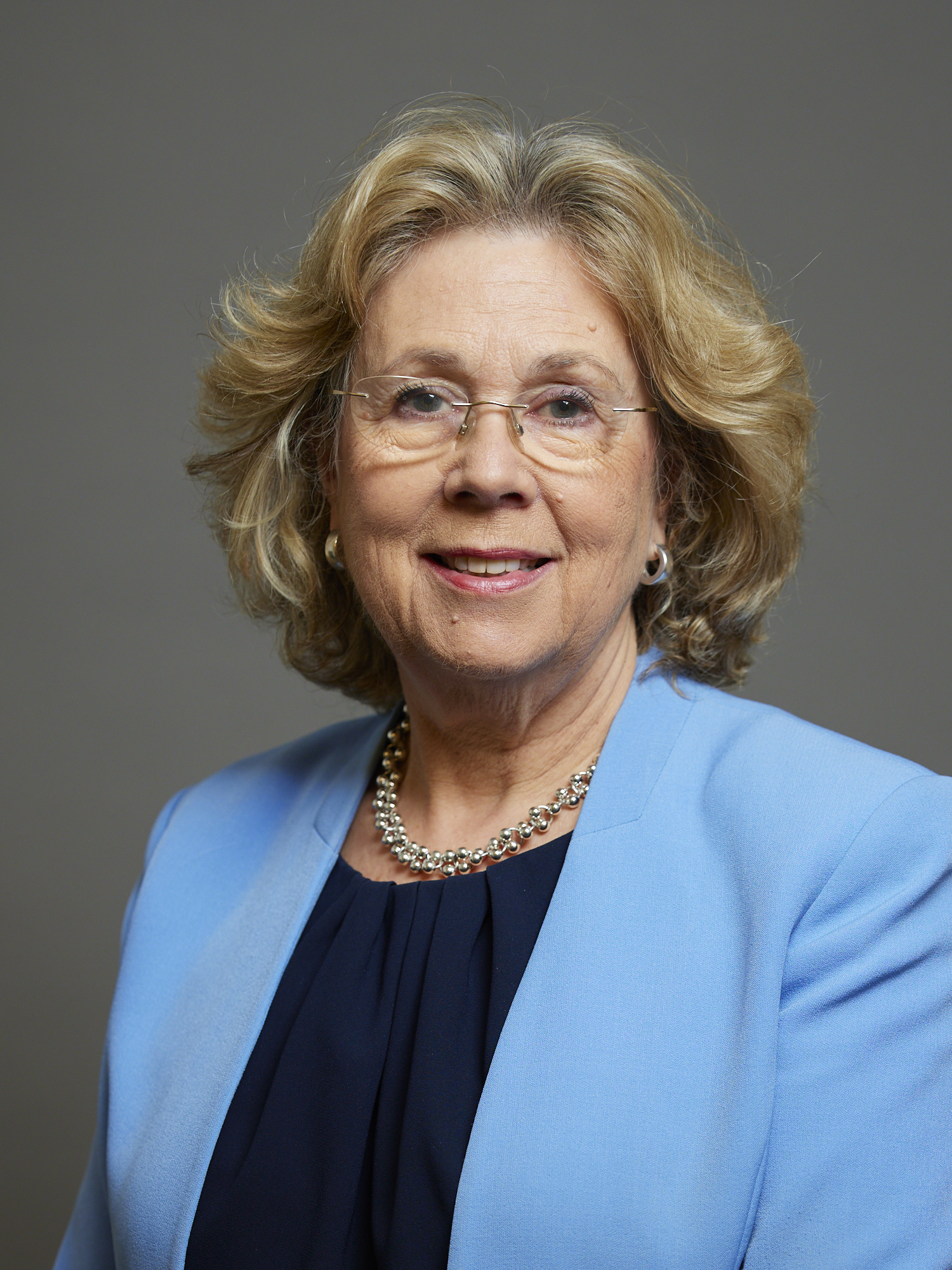
- Official portrait, 2022

Parliamentary Under-Secretary of State for International Development
- In office 4 November 2014 – 7 May 2015
- Prime Minister: David Cameron
- Preceded by: Lynne Featherstone
- Succeeded by: The Baroness Verma

Baroness-in-waiting Government Whip
- In office 11 May 2010 – 4 November 2014
- Prime Minister: David Cameron
- Preceded by: The Baroness Farrington of Ribbleton
- Succeeded by: The Lord Bourne of Aberystwyth

Member of the House of Lords
- Lord Temporal
- Life peerage 1 May 2000

Personal details
- Born: Lindsay Patricia Granshaw; 21 August 1954 (age 72)
- Party: Liberal Democrats
- Other political affiliations: SDP (until 1988)
- Education: St Anne's College, Oxford; University of Pennsylvania
- Occupation: Politician; Academic

Lindsay Patricia Northover, Baroness Northover, (born 21 August 1954; née Granshaw) is a British academic, Liberal Democrat politician, member of the House of Lords, and former junior government minister.

== Early life ==
The daughter of Charles and Patricia Granshaw, Northover was born on 21 August 1954. She was educated at Brighton and Hove High School, a private school for girls in Brighton. She went on to study at St Anne's College, Oxford, where in 1976 she graduated Bachelor of Arts in modern history. She received an English-Speaking Union Scholarship and a Mrs Giles Whiting Fellowship to study at Bryn Mawr College and the University of Pennsylvania, receiving an examined Master of Arts degree in 1978 and graduating as a Doctor of Philosophy in the history and philosophy of science in 1981.

== Career ==
=== Academic career ===
Northover was awarded a research fellowship at University College London and St Mark's Hospital from 1980 to 1983, and a further research fellowship in 1983–84 at St Thomas's Hospital Medical School in London. She was then appointed Lecturer at University College London and Wellcome Institute in 1984, where she taught medical students, human science students and others from across the University of London, and carried out research on the history of modern medicine, authoring various academic books and articles.

=== Political career ===
Northover contested Welwyn Hatfield in the 1983 and 1987 general elections, and Basildon in the 1997 general election. She was a member of the committee which negotiated the merger between the Liberal Party and the SDP in 1987–1988, forming the Liberal Democrats. She was Chair of Women Liberal Democrats 1992–1995, Chair of the SDP and then the Liberal Democrats Parliamentary Candidates Association 1987–1991, and subsequently its Vice-President, and Chair of the Health and Social Welfare Association, 1987–1988.

On 1 May 2000, she was created a life peer, taking her married name of Northover, as Baroness Northover, of Cissbury in the County of West Sussex. She was the Liberal Democrats Health Spokesperson in the House of Lords 2000–02 and main frontbench Liberal Democrats Spokesperson on International Development in the House of Lords, 2002–2010. She has been a member of various House of Lords Select Committees including those on Embryonic Stem Cell Research (2001–02), and on the European Union (Sub-Committee on Foreign Affairs, Defence and International Development 2003–04; Sub-Committee on Economic and Financial Affairs, 2008–10).

In 2010 under the Coalition Government, she was appointed as Government Whip (Baroness-in-Waiting) and Spokesperson on International Development, Health, Justice and Women and Equalities, later covering Education, DCMS and DEFRA, instead of Justice and Health.

Northover was a Member of Council of the Overseas Development Institute, 2005–2010; Trustee of the Tropical Health and Education Trust, 2007–10; Vice-Chair of the British Council Associate Parliamentary Group, 2007–10; Vice-Chair of the Commonwealth Parliamentary Association, 2008–10; Trustee of the Liberal Democrats, 2009–11; Trustee of UNICEF UK, 2009–10; Vice-Chair of the All Party Parliamentary Group on HIV/AIDS; Vice-Chair of the All Party Parliamentary Group on Aid, Debt and Trade; and Secretary of the All Party Group on Overseas Development. She was promoted to become Under Secretary of State in the Department for International Development in November 2014.

== Personal life ==
Northover has three adult children.
