= Oliver Heald =

British Conservative politician

The Right Honourable Sir Oliver Heald KC
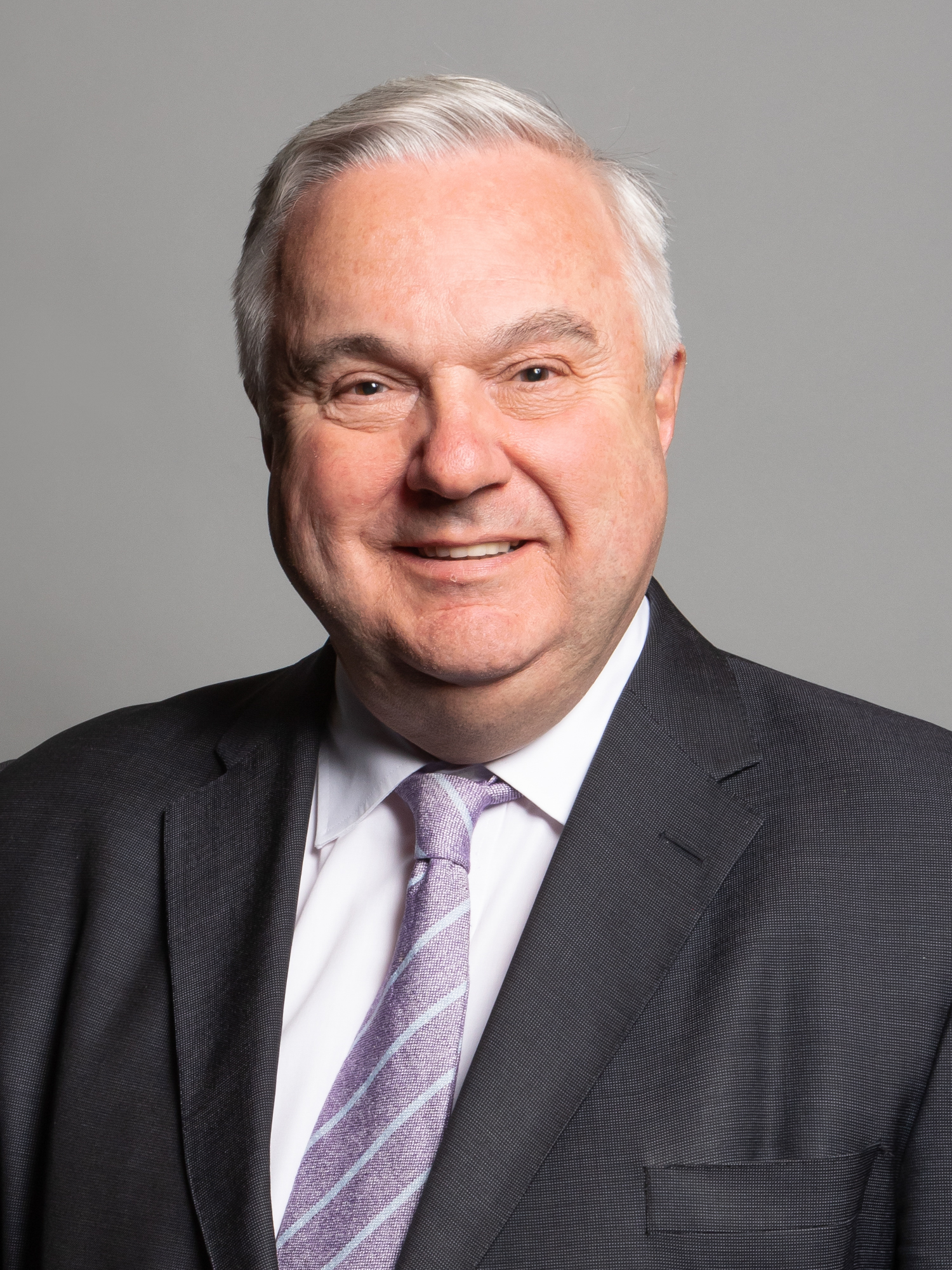
- Official portrait, 2020

Minister of State for Courts and Justice
- In office 16 July 2016 – 12 June 2017
- Prime Minister: Theresa May
- Preceded by: Shailesh Vara
- Succeeded by: Dominic Raab

Solicitor General for England and Wales
- In office 4 September 2012 – 14 July 2014
- Prime Minister: David Cameron
- Preceded by: Edward Garnier
- Succeeded by: Robert Buckland

Parliamentary Under-Secretary of State for Social Security
- In office 6 July 1995 – 2 May 1997 Serving with Andrew Mitchell
- Prime Minister: John Major
- Preceded by: James Arbuthnot
- Succeeded by: Keith Bradley
Shadow Cabinet positions
Shadow Secretary of State for Justice
In office 8 May 2007 – 2 July 2007
Leader	David Cameron
Preceded by	Himself (Constitutional Affairs)
Succeeded by	Nicholas Herbert
Shadow Chancellor of the Duchy of Lancaster
In office 8 December 2005 – 2 July 2007
Leader	David Cameron
Preceded by	Eric Forth (2003)
Succeeded by	Francis Maude
Shadow Secretary of State for Constitutional Affairs
In office 15 March 2004 – 8 May 2007
Leader	Michael Howard; David Cameron
Preceded by	Alan Duncan
Succeeded by	Himself (Justice)
Shadow Leader of the House of Commons
In office 11 November 2003 – 10 May 2005
Leader	Michael Howard
Preceded by	Eric Forth
Succeeded by	Christopher Grayling
Junior Shadow portfolios
1997–2000	Whip
2000–2001	Policing
2001–2002	Heath
2002–2003	Work and Pensions

Member of Parliament for North East Hertfordshire North Hertfordshire (1992–1997)
- In office 9 April 1992 – 30 May 2024
- Preceded by: Ian Stewart
- Succeeded by: Christopher Hinchliff

Personal details
- Born: 15 December 1954 (age 71) Reading, Berkshire, England
- Party: Conservative
- Spouse: Christine Whittle
- Education: Pembroke College, Cambridge; City Law School
- Website: Official website

Sir Oliver Heald, KC (born 15 December 1954) is a British barrister and Conservative Party politician who served as the Member of Parliament (MP) for North East Hertfordshire, formerly North Hertfordshire, from 1992 to 2024.

== Early life and career ==
Oliver Heald was born on 15 December 1954 in Reading, Berkshire, and was educated at Reading School and Pembroke College, Cambridge, where he read Law. He was called to the Bar at the Middle Temple in 1977 and was a practising barrister in London and East Anglia at Fenners Chambers in Cambridge from 1979 until he was elected to Parliament.

He was Chairman of the North Hertfordshire Conservative Association for two years from 1984.

At the 1987 general election, Heald stood as the Conservative candidate in Southwark and Bermondsey, coming third with 12.6% of the vote behind the incumbent Liberal MP Simon Hughes and the Labour candidate.

He became the Vice-President of the Southwark and Bermondsey Conservative Association in 1988 for five years, becoming the President for five years from 1993.

== Parliamentary career ==
Heald was elected to the House of Commons as MP for North Hertfordshire at the 1992 general election with 49.8% of the vote and a majority of 16,531. He made his maiden speech on 9 June 1992 in which he spoke of his political beginnings on a soapbox at Speakers' Corner.

In Parliament he served on the Education Select committee for two years from 1992. He was appointed as the Parliamentary Private Secretary (PPS) to the Minister of State at the Home Office Peter Lloyd in 1994. Later in the year he became the PPS to the Minister of Agriculture, Fisheries and Food, William Waldegrave.

He was promoted to serve in the Government of John Major in 1995 when he was appointed as the Parliamentary Under Secretary of State at the Department of Social Security, where he remained until the fall of the Conservative government in 1997. In 1995 he introduced the Insurance Companies (Reserves) Act.

Prior to the 1997 general election, Heald's constituency of North Hertfordshire was abolished, and replaced with North East Hertfordshire. At the election, Heald was elected to Parliament as MP for North East Hertfordshire with 41.7% of the vote and a majority of 3,088.

After the election he became an Opposition Whip under the new leadership of William Hague, before moving on to become a Spokesman for Home Affairs with responsibility for police matters.

Heald was re-elected as MP for North East Hertfordshire at the 2001 general election with an increased vote share of 44.1% and an increased majority of 3,444.

He was made a Spokesman for Health by Iain Duncan Smith in 2001.

He joined Michael Howard's Shadow Cabinet as the Shadow Leader of the House of Commons in 2003. In 2004 he was then appointed to serve as Shadow Secretary of State for Constitutional Affairs and in 2005 was appointed by David Cameron as the Shadow Chancellor of the Duchy of Lancaster.

At the 2005 general election, Heald was again re-elected with an increased vote share of 47.3% and an increased majority of 9,138.

From November 2007 to September 2012 he was a member of the Work and Pensions Select Committee, and from March 2008 – September 2012 he was a member of the Committee on Standards in Public Life.

At the 2010 general election, Heald was again re-elected with an increased vote share of 53.5% and an increased majority of 15,194.

From July 2010 until September 2012 he was appointed to the House of Commons Standards and Privileges Committee and he has also been a member of the UK Delegation to the Council of Europe.

In 2012, Heald returned to Government as Solicitor-General. He had previously helped to lead the rebellion against the House of Lords Reform Bill, eventually abstaining on the vote.

At the 2015 general election, Heald was again re-elected with an increased vote share of 55.4% and an increased majority of 19,080.

Heald was opposed to Brexit prior to the 2016 referendum.

On 29 September 2016, he was appointed to the Privy Council of the United Kingdom and may therefore use the style The Right Honourable.

Heald was again re-elected at the snap 2017 general election, with an increased vote share of 58.6% and a decreased majority of 16,835.

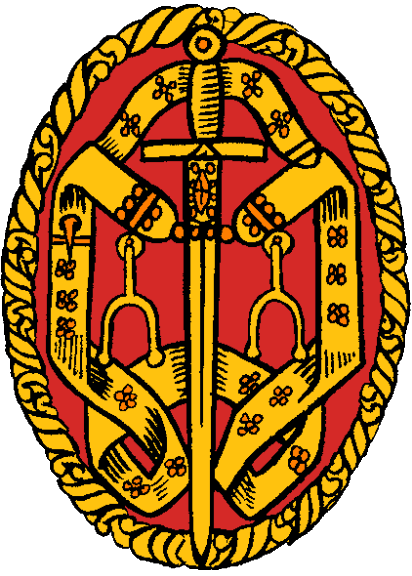
Insignia of a Knight Bachelor

In December 2017 Heald voted with fellow Conservative Dominic Grieve and nine other Conservative MPs against the government, and in favour of guaranteeing Parliament a "meaningful vote" on any deal Theresa May agrees with Brussels over Brexit.

At the 2019 general election, Heald was again re-elected, with a decreased vote share of 56.6% and an increased majority of 18,189.

Heald was knighted in the 2014 Special Honours.

In January 2024, Heald announced that he would stand down at the 2024 general election. The Conservative Party candidate to replace him was former special adviser Nikki da Costa, who lost to Labour's Chris Hinchliff.

== Personal life ==
Heald became the Executive Chairman of the Society of Conservative Lawyers in July 2008. He takes a particular interest in healthcare.

He and his wife Christine (née Whittle) live in his former Hertfordshire constituency, in the market town of Royston; they have a son and two daughters. His daughter Sarah stood as a Conservative candidate in Manchester Withington in the 2017 election.

Parliament of the United Kingdom
Preceded by Ian Stewart	Member of Parliament for North Hertfordshire; 1992–1997	Constituency abolished
New constituency	Member of Parliament for North East Hertfordshire; 1997–2024	Succeeded by Chris Hinchliff
Political offices
Preceded by Eric Forth	Shadow Leader of the House of Commons; 2003–2005	Succeeded by Chris Grayling
Preceded by Alan Duncan	Shadow Secretary of State for Constitutional Affairs; 2004–2007	Succeeded by Himself as Shadow Secretary of State for Justice
Vacant Title last held by Eric Forth	Shadow Chancellor of the Duchy of Lancaster; 2005–2007	Succeeded by Francis Maude
Preceded by Himself as Shadow Secretary of State for Constitutional Affairs	Shadow Secretary of State for Justice; 2007	Succeeded by Nick Herbert
Preceded by Edward Garnier	Solicitor General for England and Wales; 2012–2014	Succeeded by Robert Buckland
