= Hitchin and Harpenden =

UK Parliament constituency (1997–2024)

Coordinates: 51.83°N 0.21°W

- Former county constituency for the House of Commons
- Boundary of Hitchin and Harpenden in Hertfordshire
- County: Hertfordshire
- Electorate: 74,189 (December 2010)
- Major settlements: Hitchin, Harpenden, Wheathampstead, Redbourn

1997–2024
- Seats: One
- Created from: North Hertfordshire; St Albans; Welwyn Hatfield
- Replaced by: Hitchin; Harpenden and Berkhamsted

Hitchin and Harpenden was a constituency (Note: A county constituency (for the purposes of election expenses and type of returning officer)) represented in the House of Commons of the UK Parliament from 1997 general election until 2024 general election. (Note: As with all constituencies, the constituency elects one Member of Parliament (MP) by the first past the post system of election at least every five years.) The seat was represented by the Conservative Party for the duration of its existence.

Following its abolition in 2024, the contents of the constituency were distributed to the new seats of Hitchin and Harpenden and Berkhamsted.

== History ==
The constituency was created for the 1997 general election from parts of several former Hertfordshire seats. Prior to 1997, Hitchin was included in the abolished North Hertfordshire constituency and Harpenden in the St Albans constituency, while the village of Wheathampstead was part of the Welwyn Hatfield constituency.

The seat's first MP was Peter Lilley, a former Secretary of State for various government departments in the Major ministry in the 1990s, who had previously represented St Albans from 1983 to 1997. He announced he would not contest the seat at the 2017 general election. He was succeeded in 2017 by Bim Afolami of the Conservatives, who retained it at the 2019 general election, albeit with a reduced majority.

The seat was abolished at the 2024 general election, and was divided between the new seats of Hitchin (containing 54.9% of the abolished seat's electorate) and Harpenden and Berkhamsted (containing the remaining 45.1%). Afolami attempted to seek re-election in Hitchin, but was defeated by the Labour candidate Alistair Strathern.

== Boundaries ==
Map of boundaries 2010–2024

=== 1997–2010 ===
- The District of North Hertfordshire wards of Ashbrook, Bearton, Cadwell, Highbury, Hitchwood, Hoo, Kimpton, Offa, Oughton, Priory, and Walsworth; and
- The City of St Albans wards of Harpenden East, Harpenden North, Harpenden South, Harpenden West, Redbourn, Sandridge, and Wheathampstead.

=== 2010–2024 ===
- The District of North Hertfordshire wards of Cadwell, Graveley and Wymondley, Hitchin Bearton, Hitchin Highbury, Hitchin Oughton, Hitchin Priory, Hitchin Walsworth, Hitchwood, Hoo, Kimpton, and Offa; and
- The City of St Albans wards of Harpenden East, Harpenden North, Harpenden South, Harpenden West, Redbourn, Sandridge, and Wheathampstead.

Minor gain from North East Hertfordshire due to revision of local authority wards.

=== Abolition ===
Further to the completion of the 2023 review of Westminster constituencies, the seat was abolished for the 2024 general election, with its contents distributed to two new constituencies:

- Parts in the District of North Hertfordshire, including Hitchin incorporated into the re-established constituency of Hitchin, which forms a cross-county boundary seat with parts of Central Bedfordshire
- Parts in the City of St Albans, including Harpenden incorporated into the newly created seat of Harpenden and Berkhamsted

== Members of Parliament ==
Election	Member	Party
1997	Peter Lilley	Conservative
2017	Bim Afolami	Conservative

== Election results ==
=== Elections in the 2010s ===
General election 2019: Hitchin and Harpenden
Party	Candidate	Votes	%	±%
Conservative	Bim Afolami	27,719	47.1	−6.0
Liberal Democrats	Sam Collins	20,824	35.4	+24.8
Labour	Kay Tart	9,959	16.9	−15.7
CPA	Sid Cordle	268	0.5	+0.1
Advance	Peter Marshall	101	0.2	New
Majority		6,895	11.7	−8.8
Turnout		58,921	77.1	−0.3
Conservative hold		Swing	−15.4	

General election 2017: Hitchin and Harpenden
Party	Candidate	Votes	%	±%
Conservative	Bim Afolami	31,189	53.1	−3.8
Labour	John Hayes	19,158	32.6	+12.0
Liberal Democrats	Hugh Annand	6,236	10.6	+2.5
Green	Richard Cano	1,329	2.3	−3.2
Independent	Ray Blake	629	1.1	New
CPA	Sid Cordle	242	0.4	New
Majority		12,031	20.5	−15.8
Turnout		58,783	77.4	+8.5
Conservative hold		Swing	−7.9	

General election 2015: Hitchin and Harpenden
Party	Candidate	Votes	%	±%
Conservative	Peter Lilley	31,488	56.9	+2.3
Labour	Rachel Burgin	11,433	20.6	+7.0
UKIP	John Stocker	4,917	8.9	+5.9
Liberal Democrats	Pauline Pearce	4,484	8.1	−18.6
Green	Richard Wise	3,053	5.5	+4.0
Majority		20,055	36.3	+8.4
Turnout		55,375	68.9	−5.2
Conservative hold		Swing	+2.3	

General election 2010: Hitchin and Harpenden
Party	Candidate	Votes	%	±%
Conservative	Peter Lilley	29,869	54.6	+4.7
Liberal Democrats	Nigel Quinton	14,598	26.7	+0.9
Labour	Oliver de Botton	7,413	13.6	−8.8
UKIP	Graham Wilkinson	1,633	3.0	+1.3
Green	Richard Wise	807	1.5	New
Independent	Margaret Henderson	109	0.2	New
Citizens for Undead Rights and Equality	Simon Byron	108	0.2	New
Your Right to Democracy	Eric Hannah	90	0.2	New
Independent	Peter Rigby	50	0.1	−0.3
Majority		15,271	27.9	+3.9
Turnout		54,707	74.1	+5.4
Conservative hold		Swing	+2.5	

=== Elections in the 2000s ===
General election 2005: Hitchin and Harpenden
Party	Candidate	Votes	%	±%
Conservative	Peter Lilley	23,627	49.9	+2.6
Liberal Democrats	Hannah Hedges	12,234	25.8	+7.8
Labour	Paul Orrett	10,499	22.2	−10.3
UKIP	John Saunders	828	1.7	+0.4
Independent	Peter Rigby	199	0.4	−0.4
Majority		11,393	24.1	+9.3
Turnout		47,387	70.5	+3.6
Conservative hold		Swing	−2.6	

General election 2001: Hitchin and Harpenden
Party	Candidate	Votes	%	±%
Conservative	Peter Lilley	21,271	47.3	+1.4
Labour	Alan Amos	14,608	32.5	−0.6
Liberal Democrats	John Murphy	8,076	18.0	−2.1
UKIP	John Saunders	606	1.3	New
Independent	Peter Rigby	363	0.8	New
Majority		6,663	14.8	+2.0
Turnout		44,924	66.9	−11.1
Conservative hold		Swing	+1.0	

=== Elections in the 1990s ===
General election 1997: Hitchin and Harpenden
Party	Candidate	Votes	%	±%
Conservative	Peter Lilley	24,038	45.9	
Labour	Rosemary Sanderson	17,367	33.1	
Liberal Democrats	Chris J. White	10,515	20.1	
Natural Law	David R.H. Cooke	290	0.6	
Socialist	Jim D.O. Horton	217	0.4	
Majority		6,671	12.8	
Turnout		52,427	78.0	
Conservative win (new seat)				

== See also ==
- Parliamentary constituencies in Hertfordshire
