= Welwyn Hatfield (constituency) =

UK Parliament constituency (since 1974)

Coordinates: 51°46′10″N 0°11′40″W

- County constituency for the House of Commons
- Interactive map of boundaries since 2024
- Location within the East of England
- County: Hertfordshire
- Electorate: 74,535 (2023)
- Major settlements: Brookmans Park, Hatfield, Welham Green, Welwyn Garden City

Current constituency
- Created: 1974
- Member of Parliament: Andrew Lewin (Labour)
- Seats: One
- Created from: Hertford and St Albans

Welwyn Hatfield is a constituency (Note: A county constituency (for the purposes of election expenses and type of returning officer)) in Hertfordshire represented in the House of Commons of the UK Parliament since 2024 by Andrew Lewin, a member of the Labour Party.

== Constituency profile ==
The area has a higher than average proportion of managers, professionals and retired people than much of Greater London. The seat has a strong local economy, with extensive retail and industrial/commercial premises, particularly in Welwyn Garden City and Hatfield. Two of the four largest Hertfordshire economic towns, Stevenage and St Albans are also close by. Accordingly, workless claimants who were registered jobseekers were in November 2012 significantly lower than the national average of 3.8%, at 2.4% of the population based on a statistical compilation by The Guardian.

== History ==
Prior to 1950, most of Welwyn Hatfield was in the St Albans constituency, though the town of Welwyn was in the Hitchin constituency. For the five years between 1950 and 1955, Welwyn Garden City remained in the St Albans constituency, whilst Hatfield was placed in the now abolished Barnet constituency. Then in 1955, Both Welwyn Garden City and Hatfield were moved to the also now abolished Hertford constituency. The Welwyn Hatfield seat was created for the February 1974 United Kingdom general election following the second periodic review of Westminster constituencies, as Welwyn and Hatfield. For the 1983 general election, the constituency was renamed in line with the recently created District of Welwyn Hatfield.

=== Political history ===
Despite its short history, the seat has seen two parties serve it, with three Labour periods of representation, during the longer part of the Labour government of 1974 to 1979, the first two terms of the Blair ministry and the Starmer ministry. Other than this the seat has elected a Conservative as its MP.

The 2005 majority more than tripled on the second election of Grant Shapps, in 2010, from a historically breakable (in the constituency) majority of 5,946 votes to the 26th largest Conservative share of the vote, which on standard uniform swing seen in elections since 1931 represented a safe seat, but a 5% swing to Labour in 2017 meant that the seat was somewhat marginal again, needing a 7.1% swing to become Labour. In the 2024 election, a swing of 14.3% led to the election of Labour's Andrew Lewin with a majority of 3,799.

=== Prominent frontbenchers ===
The first MP ended his term in the Commons as the member for Welwyn Hatfield before which he was Defence Minister from 1970 to 1972 then a Foreign Office Minister until February 1974 - later that year Lord Balniel was awarded a life peerage, (Note: Balniel joined his father, the Earl of Crawford, who from 1963 no longer had to be regularly elected as a Scottish representative peer) accelerating and safeguarding his right to sit in the Lords. The second MP later became the politically neutral Lord Speaker, Baroness Hayman.

During five years of the Blair ministry, the constituency's MP Melanie Johnson was a frontbench minister, serving as Economic Secretary to the Treasury, Minister for Competition and Consumers and the Minister for Public Health.

Grant Shapps, her successor, was appointed the Minister of State for Housing and Local Government for the first two years of the UK coalition government 2010 before being appointed to chair his party. Following the Conservative victory in 2015, he was appointed Minister of State at the Department for International Development before resigning in November 2015. Shapps was briefly Home Secretary for six days from 19 October 2022 covering the period between the resignation and reinstatement of Suella Braverman. Since then, he has served as Secretary of State for Business, Energy and Industrial Strategy followed by Secretary of State for Energy Security and Net Zero.

== Boundaries and boundary changes ==
=== Historic ===
==== 1974–1983 ====
- The Urban District of Welwyn Garden City; and
- The Rural Districts of Hatfield and Welwyn.

In April 1974 these local authorities were abolished and were merged into the Welwyn Hatfield District.

==== 1983–1997 ====
- The District of Welwyn Hatfield wards of Brookmans Park and Little Heath, Haldens, Handside, Hatfield Central, Hatfield East, Hatfield North, Hatfield South, Hollybush, Howlands, Peartree, Sherrards, Welham Green and Redhall, Welwyn East, and Welwyn West; and
- The City of St Albans ward of Wheathampstead.

Wheathampstead had formerly been in the St Albans parliamentary constituency. The Welwyn Hatfield ward of Northaw was included in the new Broxbourne parliamentary constituency.

Map of boundaries 2010-2024

==== 1997–2010 ====
As above minus Wheathampstead ward, which was transferred to the new constituency of Hitchin and Harpenden.

==== 2010–2024 ====
- The District of Welwyn Hatfield wards of Brookmans Park and Little Heath, Haldens, Handside, Hatfield Central, Hatfield East, Hatfield North, Hatfield South, Hatfield West, Hollybush, Howlands, Panshanger, Peartree, Sherrards, Welham Green, Welwyn North, and Welwyn South.

Contents updated to reflect local authority boundary review. Northaw remained in the Broxbourne constituency.

=== Current ===
- The District of Welwyn Hatfield wards of Brookmans Park and Little Heath, Haldens, Handside, Hatfield Central, Hatfield East, Hatfield South West, Hatfield Villages, Hollybush, Howlands, Panshanger, Peartree, Sherrards, Welham Green and Hatfield South, Welwyn East, and Welwyn West.

Further to the 2023 review of Westminster constituencies, which came into effect for the 2024 general election, the composition of the constituency is unchanged, except for very minor modifications due to ward boundary revisions.

The District of Welwyn Hatfield ward of Northaw and Cuffley was transferred from Broxbourne to Hertsmere.

== Members of Parliament ==
For elections prior to 1974, see St Albans (Welwyn and Hatfield 1885-1950; Welwyn Garden City 1950-1955), Barnet (Hatfield 1950-1955), and Hertford (Welwyn and Hatfield 1955-1974).

| Election | Member | Party |
|---|---|---|
| Feb 1974 | Lord Balniel | Conservative |
| Oct 1974 | Helene Hayman | Labour |
| 1979 | Christopher Murphy | Conservative |
| 1987 | David Evans | Conservative |
| 1997 | Melanie Johnson | Labour |
| 2005 | Grant Shapps | Conservative |
| 2024 | Andrew Lewin | Labour |

== Elections ==
Vote share in Welwyn Hatfield, 1974-2024

=== Elections in the 2020s ===
General election 2024: Welwyn Hatfield
| Party | Candidate | Votes | % | ±% |
|---|---|---|---|---|
| Labour | Andrew Lewin | 19,877 | 41.0 | +9.3 |
| Conservative | Grant Shapps | 16,078 | 33.2 | −19.3 |
| Reform | Jack Aaron | 6,397 | 13.2 | New |
| Liberal Democrats | John Munro | 3,117 | 6.4 | −6.3 |
| Green | Sarah Butcher | 2,986 | 6.2 | +3.1 |
| Majority | | 3,799 | 7.8 | N/A |
| Turnout | | 48,455 | 64.6 | −4.9 |
| Labour gain from Conservative | | Swing | +14.4 | |

=== Elections in the 2010s ===
General election 2019: Welwyn Hatfield
| Party | Candidate | Votes | % | ±% |
|---|---|---|---|---|
| Conservative | Grant Shapps | 27,394 | 52.6 | +1.6 |
| Labour | Rosie Newbigging | 16,439 | 31.6 | −5.2 |
| Liberal Democrats | Paul Zukowskyj | 6,602 | 12.7 | +5.3 |
| Green | Oliver Sayers | 1,618 | 3.1 | +1.5 |
| Majority | | 10,955 | 21.0 | +6.8 |
| Turnout | | 52,053 | 69.5 | −1.5 |
| Conservative hold | | Swing | +3.4 | |

General election 2017: Welwyn Hatfield
| Party | Candidate | Votes | % | ±% |
|---|---|---|---|---|
| Conservative | Grant Shapps | 26,374 | 51.0 | +0.6 |
| Labour | Anawar Miah | 19,005 | 36.8 | +10.7 |
| Liberal Democrats | Nigel Quinton | 3,836 | 7.4 | +1.1 |
| UKIP | Dean Milliken | 1,441 | 2.8 | –10.3 |
| Green | Christianne Sayers | 835 | 1.6 | –1.9 |
| Independent | Melvyn Jones | 178 | 0.3 | New |
| Majority | | 7,369 | 14.2 | –10.1 |
| Turnout | | 51,669 | 71.0 | +2.5 |
| Conservative hold | | Swing | −5.0 | |

General election 2015: Welwyn Hatfield
| Party | Candidate | Votes | % | ±% |
|---|---|---|---|---|
| Conservative | Grant Shapps | 25,281 | 50.4 | −6.6 |
| Labour | Anawar Miah | 13,128 | 26.1 | +4.7 |
| UKIP | Arthur Stevens | 6,556 | 13.1 | +9.7 |
| Liberal Democrats | Hugh Annand | 3,140 | 6.3 | −10.1 |
| Green | Marc Scheimann | 1,742 | 3.5 | +1.9 |
| Independent | Michael Green | 216 | 0.4 | New |
| TUSC | Richard Shattock | 142 | 0.3 | New |
| Majority | | 12,153 | 24.3 | −11.3 |
| Turnout | | 50,205 | 68.5 | +0.5 |
| Conservative hold | | Swing | −5.7 | |

General election 2010: Welwyn Hatfield
| Party | Candidate | Votes | % | ±% |
|---|---|---|---|---|
| Conservative | Grant Shapps | 27,894 | 57.0 | +7.4 |
| Labour | Mike Hobday | 10,471 | 21.4 | −14.9 |
| Liberal Democrats | Paul Zukowskyj | 8,010 | 16.4 | +2.2 |
| UKIP | David Platt | 1,643 | 3.4 | New |
| Green | Jill Weston | 796 | 1.6 | New |
| Independent | Nigel Parker | 158 | 0.3 | New |
| Majority | | 17,423 | 35.6 | +22.3 |
| Turnout | | 48,972 | 68.0 | −0.2 |
| Conservative hold | | Swing | +11.1 | |

=== Elections in the 2000s ===
General election 2005: Welwyn Hatfield
| Party | Candidate | Votes | % | ±% |
|---|---|---|---|---|
| Conservative | Grant Shapps | 22,172 | 49.6 | +9.2 |
| Labour | Melanie Johnson | 16,226 | 36.3 | −6.9 |
| Liberal Democrats | Sara Bedford | 6,318 | 14.1 | 0.0 |
| Majority | | 5,946 | 13.3 | N/A |
| Turnout | | 44,716 | 68.1 | +4.2 |
| Conservative gain from Labour | | Swing | +8.0 | |

General election 2001: Welwyn Hatfield
| Party | Candidate | Votes | % | ±% |
|---|---|---|---|---|
| Labour | Melanie Johnson | 18,484 | 43.2 | −3.9 |
| Conservative | Grant Shapps | 17,288 | 40.4 | +3.9 |
| Liberal Democrats | Daniel Cooke | 6,021 | 14.1 | +0.6 |
| UKIP | Malcolm Biggs | 798 | 1.9 | New |
| ProLife Alliance | Fiona Pinto | 230 | 0.5 | 0.0 |
| Majority | | 1,196 | 2.8 | −7.8 |
| Turnout | | 42,821 | 63.9 | −14.7 |
| Labour hold | | Swing | −3.9 | |

=== Elections in the 1990s ===
General election 1997: Welwyn Hatfield
| Party | Candidate | Votes | % | ±% |
|---|---|---|---|---|
| Labour | Melanie Johnson | 24,936 | 47.1 | +11.1 |
| Conservative | David Evans | 19,341 | 36.5 | −11.0 |
| Liberal Democrats | Rodney Schwartz | 7,161 | 13.5 | −2.5 |
| Residents Association | Victor Cox | 1,263 | 2.4 | New |
| ProLife Alliance | Helen Harrold | 267 | 0.5 | New |
| Majority | | 5,595 | 10.6 | N/A |
| Turnout | | 52,968 | 78.6 | −5.7 |
| Labour gain from Conservative | | Swing | +11.0 | |

General election 1992: Welwyn Hatfield
| Party | Candidate | Votes | % | ±% |
|---|---|---|---|---|
| Conservative | David Evans | 29,447 | 48.4 | +2.8 |
| Labour | Ray Little | 20,982 | 34.5 | +8.1 |
| Liberal Democrats | Robin Parker | 10,196 | 16.7 | −10.6 |
| Natural Law | Eva Lucas | 264 | 0.4 | New |
| Majority | | 8,465 | 13.9 | −4.4 |
| Turnout | | 60,889 | 84.3 | +3.4 |
| Conservative hold | | Swing | −2.7 | |

=== Elections in the 1980s ===
General election 1987: Welwyn Hatfield
| Party | Candidate | Votes | % | ±% |
|---|---|---|---|---|
| Conservative | David Evans | 27,164 | 45.6 | –2.1 |
| SDP | Lindsay Granshaw | 16,261 | 27.3 | +0.8 |
| Labour | Chris Pond | 15,699 | 26.4 | +0.6 |
| Ind. Conservative | Bruce Dyson | 401 | 0.7 | New |
| Majority | | 10,903 | 18.3 | –2.9 |
| Turnout | | 59,525 | 80.9 | +1.5 |
| Conservative hold | | Swing | -1.4 | |

General election 1983: Welwyn Hatfield
| Party | Candidate | Votes | % | ±% |
|---|---|---|---|---|
| Conservative | Christopher Murphy | 27,498 | 47.7 | –0.9 |
| SDP | Lindsay Granshaw | 15,252 | 26.5 | New |
| Labour | John France | 14,898 | 25.8 | –16.9 |
| Majority | | 12,246 | 21.2 | +15.4 |
| Turnout | | 57,648 | 79.4 | −5.6 |
| Conservative hold | | Swing | | |

=== Elections in the 1970s ===
General election 1979: Welwyn and Hatfield
| Party | Candidate | Votes | % | ±% |
|---|---|---|---|---|
| Conservative | Christopher Murphy | 28,892 | 48.59 | |
| Labour | Helene Hayman | 25,418 | 42.75 | |
| Liberal | J Hurd | 4,688 | 7.88 | |
| National Front | P Ruddock | 459 | 0.77 | New |
| Majority | | 3,474 | 5.84 | N/A |
| Turnout | | 59,457 | 84.99 | |
| Conservative gain from Labour | | Swing | | |

General election October 1974: Welwyn and Hatfield
| Party | Candidate | Votes | % | ±% |
|---|---|---|---|---|
| Labour | Helene Hayman | 23,339 | 42.76 | |
| Conservative | Robert Lindsay | 22,819 | 41.81 | |
| Liberal | PH Robinson | 8,418 | 15.42 | |
| Majority | | 520 | 0.95 | N/A |
| Turnout | | 54,576 | 81.28 | |
| Labour gain from Conservative | | Swing | | |

General election February 1974: Welwyn and Hatfield
| Party | Candidate | Votes | % | ±% |
|---|---|---|---|---|
| Conservative | Robert Lindsay | 22,581 | 39.85 | |
| Labour | CW Sewell | 21,166 | 37.35 | |
| Liberal | P Robinson | 12,923 | 22.80 | |
| Majority | | 1,415 | 2.50 | |
| Turnout | | 56,670 | 85.32 | |
| Conservative win (new seat) | | | | |

== See also ==
- List of parliamentary constituencies in Hertfordshire
- List of parliamentary constituencies in the East of England (region)
