= Robert Jones (Conservative politician) =

British politician

Minister of State for Construction, Planning and Energy Efficiency
- In office 6 July 1995 – 2 May 1997
- Prime Minister: John Major
- Preceded by: The Viscount Ullswater
- Succeeded by: Hilary Armstrong

Member of Parliament for West Hertfordshire
- In office 9 June 1983 – 8 April 1997
- Preceded by: Constituency established
- Succeeded by: Constituency abolished

Personal details
- Born: Robert Brannock Jones; 26 September 1950 Bedford, Bedfordshire, England
- Died: 16 April 2007 (aged 56) Tring, Hertfordshire, England
- Party: Conservative
- Spouse: Jenny Sandercock

Robert Brannock Jones (26 September 1950 – 16 April 2007) was a Conservative Party politician in the United Kingdom. He was Member of Parliament (MP) for West Hertfordshire for its 14-year existence, from its creation in 1983 until it was abolished in 1997. He served as Minister of State for Construction, Planning and Energy Efficiency in the Department of the Environment from 1994 to 1997.

== Early life ==
Jones was born in Bedford. His father was a civil engineer. He was educated at St Martin's School in Northwood and the Merchant Taylors' School, Northwood. He read Modern History at St Andrews University, where he was a student politician. He organised the student union to disaffiliate from the National Union of Students. While still a student, he was elected as a member of St Andrews Burgh Council from 1972 to 1975, and of Fife County Council from 1973 to 1975. He was also elected vice-chairman of the Federation of Conservative Students in 1973. Aged only 24, he stood as Conservative candidate for Kirkcaldy in the October 1974 general election, losing to the incumbent Labour MP Harry Gourlay.

Jones became a marketing executive at Tay Textiles in Dundee, and returned to England to become Head of Research at the National House Building Council from 1976 to 1978. He then worked as parliamentary adviser to the Federation of Civil Engineering Contractors, and spent time working on housing policy at Conservative Central Office. He was a member of Chiltern District Council from 1979 to 1983, and contested Stockton-on-Tees in the 1979 general election: the safe Labour seat was retained by the sitting MP Bill Rodgers. He wrote The Ratepayers Defence Manual in 1980. He was Vice-President of the Association of District Councils from 1983 to 1994.

== Parliamentary career ==
Jones was finally elected at the 1983 general election as Member of Parliament for the newly created seat of West Hertfordshire, a constituency which largely comprised the town of Hemel Hempstead. Nicholas Lyell, the sitting Conservative MP for the predecessor seat of Hemel Hempstead, moved to the safe seat of Mid Bedfordshire to avoid an expected defeat. Strong support for the SDP pushed the Labour candidate, Paul Boateng, into third place allowing Jones to win comfortably.

Jones was a proponent of the free market, associated with the Adam Smith Institute and a member of the No Turning Back group, but he called for steps to address pollution as early as 1984. He served on the Commons environment select committee from 1983 to 1994, as its chairman from 1992 to 1994. He served as Parliamentary Private Secretary (PPS) to the junior transport ministers Michael Spicer and Peter Bottomley in 1986. His appointment as a government minister was delayed until July 1994, when John Major appointed him as a junior minister in the Department of the Environment. He was promoted to Minister of State for Construction, Planning and Energy Efficiency in 1995, remaining in that office until 1997.

His parliamentary constituency was abolished by boundary changes in 1997. He stood for the seat that replaced it, Hemel Hempstead, in the 1997 general election, but lost to the Labour Co-operative candidate, Tony McWalter.

== After Parliament ==
After leaving Parliament, Jones joined Redrow plc, a FTSE 250 listed construction firm, as a non-executive director in 1997, serving as its chairman from 2000 to March 2007. He was also a non-executive director of retail park operator Freeport plc from 1998. He was also a vice-president of the Wildlife Trust, a Freeman of the City of London, and a Liveryman of the Merchant Taylors' Company.

== Death ==
Jones died in Tring from liver cancer aged 56. He was survived by his wife, Jenny Sandercock. She served as Mayor of Tring while he was an MP.

Parliament of the United Kingdom
New constituency	Member of Parliament for West Hertfordshire; 1983–1997	Constituency abolished
