= Christopher Murphy (British politician) =

British politician

Member of Parliament for Welwyn Hatfield
- In office 3 May 1979 – 18 May 1987
- Preceded by: Helene Hayman
- Succeeded by: David Evans

Personal details
- Born: Christopher Philip Yorke Murphy; 20 April 1947 (age 79) Plymouth, Devon, England
- Party: UKIP
- Other political affiliations: Conservative (formerly)

Christopher Philip Yorke Murphy (born 20 April 1947) is a British politician.

Murphy was born in Plymouth, Devon. He was the unsuccessful Conservative Party candidate for Bethnal Green and Bow in both the February 1974 and October 1974 general elections.

At the 1979 general election he was elected Member of Parliament for Welwyn Hatfield, gaining the seat from Labour incumbent Helene Hayman. He served until the 1987 general election, when he stood down.

He stood for the UK Independence Party in Eastleigh at the 2005 general election, but was not elected.

Parliament of the United Kingdom
| Preceded by Helene Hayman | Member of Parliament for Welwyn Hatfield; 1979–1987 | Succeeded by David Evans |
