= North Hertfordshire (constituency) =

UK Parliament constituency (1983–1997)

- Former county constituency for the House of Commons
- North Hertfordshire in Hertfordshire, showing boundaries used from 1983–1997
- County: Hertfordshire
- Major settlements: Letchworth, Hitchin and Royston

1983–1997
- Seats: One
- Created from: Hitchin
- Replaced by: North East Hertfordshire, Hitchin and Harpenden

North Hertfordshire was a parliamentary constituency in Hertfordshire. It returned one Member of Parliament (MP) to the House of Commons of the Parliament of the United Kingdom by the first-past-the-post system.

== History ==
The constituency was created for the 1983 general election, and abolished for the 1997 general election. It was formed from the bulk of the abolished constituency of Hitchin. On abolition, western areas, including Hitchin, formed part of the new constituency of Hitchin and Harpenden. Remaining parts, including Letchworth, Baldock and Royston, formed the majority of the new constituency of North East Hertfordshire.

It was a safe Conservative seat for its entire existence. Its first MP, Ian Stewart, previously held the old marginal seat of Hitchin, and its second and last, Oliver Heald, represented North East Hertfordshire until he stood down at the 2024 General Election.

== Boundaries ==
- The District of North Hertfordshire wards of Arbury, Ashbrook, Baldock, Bearton, Cadwell, Grange, Highbury, Hitchwood, Hoo, Kimpton, Letchworth East, Letchworth South East, Letchworth South West, Newsells, Offa, Oughton, Priory, Royston East, Royston West, Sandon, Walsworth, Weston, and Wilbury.

The three main towns in the constituency were Hitchin, Letchworth, and Royston.

== Members of Parliament ==
Election	Member	Party
1983	Ian Stewart	Conservative
1992	Oliver Heald	Conservative
1997	constituency abolished: see North East Hertfordshire & Hitchin and Harpenden	

== Election results ==
=== Elections in the 1980s ===
General election 1983: Hertfordshire North
Party	Candidate	Votes	%	±%
Conservative	Ian Stewart	29,302	49.0	
Liberal	George Binney	19,359	32.4	
Labour	James Reilly	11,104	18.6	
Majority		9,943	16.6	
Turnout		59,765	79.2	
Conservative win (new seat)				

General election 1987: Hertfordshire North
Party	Candidate	Votes	%	±%
Conservative	Ian Stewart	31,750	49.7	+0.7
Liberal	George Binney	20,308	31.8	−0.4
Labour	Alan Gorst	11,782	18.5	−0.1
Majority		11,442	17.9	+1.3
Turnout		63,840	81.1	+1.9
Conservative hold		Swing		

=== Elections in the 1990s ===
General election 1992: Hertfordshire North
Party	Candidate	Votes	%	±%
Conservative	Oliver Heald	33,679	49.8	+0.1
Liberal Democrats	Roger Liddle	17,148	25.4	−6.4
Labour	Sarah Bissett-Johnson	16,449	24.3	+5.9
Natural Law	Bryan Irving	339	0.5	New
Majority		16,531	24.4	+6.5
Turnout		67,615	84.4	+3.3
Conservative hold		Swing		

== See also ==
- List of parliamentary constituencies in Hertfordshire
