= David Evans (MP for Welwyn Hatfield) =

English business executive and politician (1935–2008)

Member of Parliament for Welwyn Hatfield
- In office 11 June 1987 – 8 April 1997
- Preceded by: Christopher Murphy
- Succeeded by: Melanie Johnson

Chairman of Luton Town F.C.
- In office November 1984 – 15 June 1989

Personal details
- Born: David John Evans; 23 April 1935 Edmonton, London, England
- Died: 22 October 2008 (aged 73) U.S.
- Spouse: Janice

David John Evans (23 April 1935 – 22 October 2008) was an English businessman, football club chairman and Conservative politician.

== Biography ==
Born in Edmonton in London, Evans came from a working-class background and attended Tottenham Technical College. He failed his eleven-plus and as a youngster he showed promise as a footballer and cricketer and played for Aston Villa, although without making any first-team appearances, between 1950 and 1954. An opening batsman, he also played for Gloucestershire County Cricket Club and Warwickshire County Cricket Club at cricket, although, again, without making any first-team appearances.

== Luton Town ==
Evans served on the Luton Town Football Club's board of directors from 1977 to 22 May 1990 when he resigned. From November 1984 to 15 June 1989, Evans was the chairman of the club. In 1978, Evans appointed David Pleat as Luton manager, and they won promotion to the Football League First Division in 1982. Later in the 1980s, he presided over a controversial membership-only scheme for fans under which only members were allowed to attend matches at the club's home ground and away supporters were banned from the stadium. This was brought about by Millwall fans rioting and damaging the Kenilworth Road stadium during an FA Cup match against Luton on 13 March 1985. His ownership of the club delivered some of the greatest successes in its history. After promotion in 1982, Luton spent a decade in the First Division, finishing as high as seventh in 1987 and winning the Football League Cup a year later.

Evans was also chairman of the Lord's Taverners, along with being a member of the Finance and Administration Sub-Committee (1981–1986) and a member of the General Committee (1985–86) of Middlesex County Cricket Club. As a cricketer, he represented Hertfordshire in the Minor Counties Championship between 1967 and 1968, made two Gillette Cup appearances for the team in 1969, scoring ten runs on his debut but a duck in his second match. He also made appearances for Club Cricket Conference from 1965 to 1980, including captaining the side.

== Member of Parliament ==
Evans represented Welwyn Hatfield as the Conservative Member of Parliament from 1987, until he lost his seat at the 1997 general election. During his time as an MP, Evans was parliamentary private secretary to several government ministers, including John Redwood when he was Secretary of State for Wales. Evans was elected to the executive of the influential 1922 Committee in 1993 and he remained there until he lost his seat in 1997.

After losing his seat in Parliament, he continued to manage his industrial cleaning business, the Broadreach Group. He retired in May 2002 when he and his business partner Jack Broadley sold it for around £17 million.

== Birmingham Six ==
Shortly before losing his seat, in early March 1997, Evans attracted controversy over unguarded remarks in an interview by sixth-formers at Stanborough School for a school magazine in which he referred to his opponent Melanie Johnson as a "single girl" (she was 42 years old at the time) with "bastard children", and claimed that the Birmingham Six were guilty and had "killed hundreds" before being caught, as well as making remarks considered racist, such as asking how the sixth-formers would feel if their daughter was raped by "some black bastard".

The Six won substantial damages from Evans in July 1998, who thereafter apologised for what he had said and promised never to repeat it.

== Death ==
David Evans died aged 73 in the US on 22 October 2008, of pulmonary fibrosis. He was married to Janice Evans.

== Quotes ==
- "Scarcely any Guardian or Independent article involving David Evans, former Tory MP for Welwyn and Hatfield, failed to mention his car-salesman's accent, a sound to chill the blood of any liberal—it seemed the incarnation of Thatcherite brutalism."

Parliament of the United Kingdom
Preceded by Christopher Murphy	Member of Parliament for Welwyn Hatfield; 1987–1997	Succeeded by Melanie Johnson
