= Bim Afolami =

British politician (born 1986)

Bim Afolami FRSA
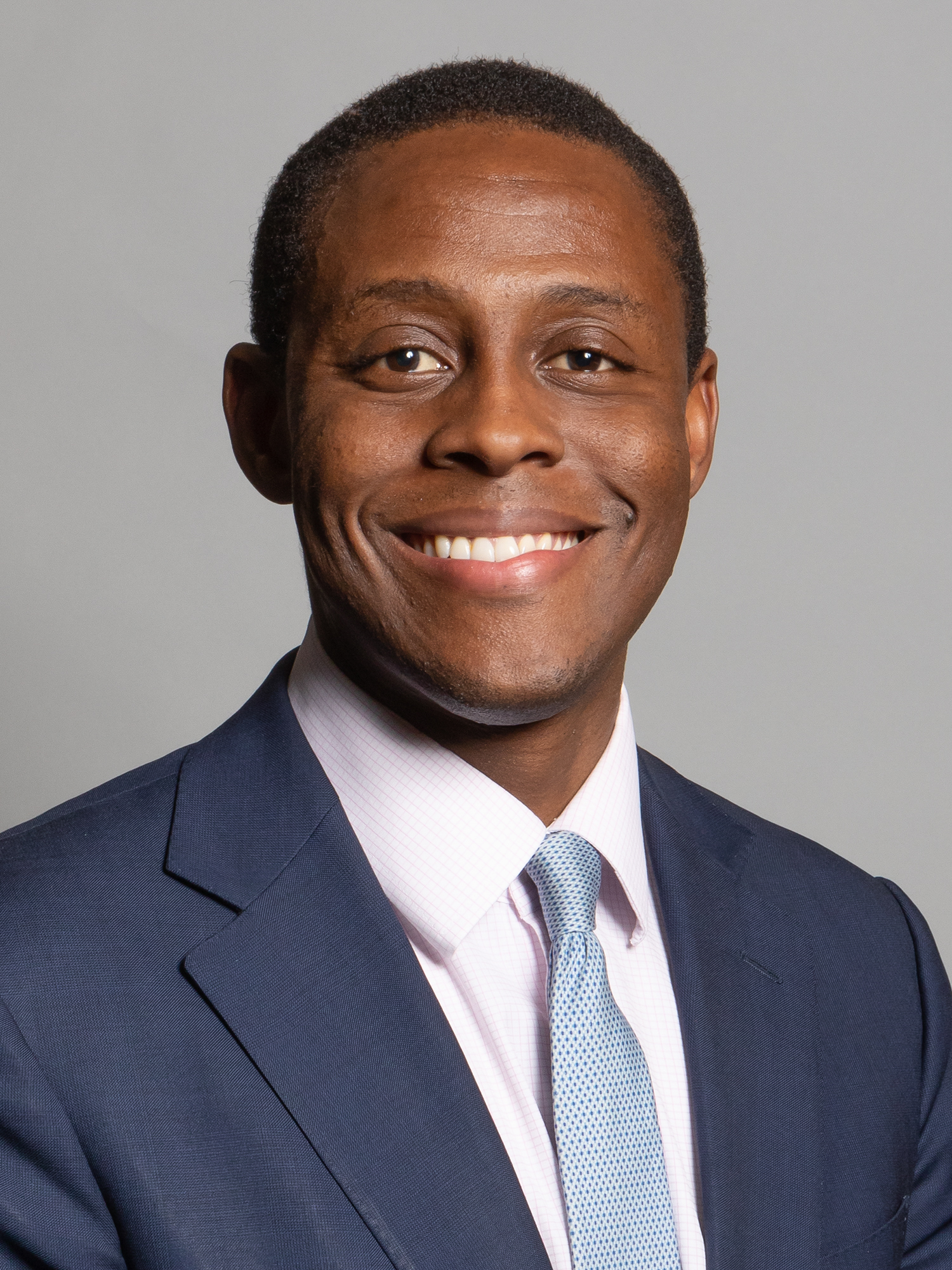
- Official portrait, 2020

Economic Secretary to the Treasury
- In office 13 November 2023 – 5 July 2024
- Prime Minister: Rishi Sunak
- Preceded by: Andrew Griffith
- Succeeded by: Tulip Siddiq

Member of Parliament for Hitchin and Harpenden
- In office 8 June 2017 – 30 May 2024
- Preceded by: Peter Lilley
- Succeeded by: Constituency abolished

Personal details
- Born: Abimbola Afolami; 11 February 1986 (age 40) Crowthorne, Berkshire, England
- Party: Conservative
- Spouse: Henrietta (née Jackson-Stops)
- Children: 3
- Education: Eton College; University College, Oxford (BA)
- Occupation: Politician
- Profession: Solicitor, Banker

Abimbola "Bim" Afolami FRSA (//; born 11 February 1986) is a British Conservative Party politician. He served as the Member of Parliament (MP) for Hitchin and Harpenden in Hertfordshire from the 2017 general election until 2024. He was the Economic Secretary to the Treasury from 2023 to 2024 and Vice Chairman of the Conservative Party in 2022. He is now Global Head of Strategy at Acrisure, one of the largest insurance businesses in the world, and also serves as a non - executive director of HSBC UK, the youngest in Britain when appointed at the age of 38.

== Early life ==
Afolami was born and brought up in Crowthorne, Berkshire. His father Samuel is a Nigerian consultant doctor in the NHS, who moved to the UK in his early twenties.

Afolami was educated at Bishopsgate School, a prep school in Egham, Surrey, and at Eton College, an all-boys independent boarding school in Berkshire. He was Berkshire county champion several times in both the 400m and triple jump as a schoolboy, and also competed at national level. He reached the final of the national English schools athletics championships finals in 2002 in the triple jump. He attended University College, Oxford, where he read modern history. While at Oxford, he was Vice President (Librarian) of the Oxford Union Society and played football for the university team.

Before he became an MP, Afolami worked as a corporate lawyer at Freshfields, Simpson Thacher & Bartlett and then as a senior executive at HSBC.

== Political career ==
Afolami was the Conservative Party candidate for Lewisham Deptford at the 2015 general election, where he finished in second place with 7,056 votes. Afolami voted "Remain" in the 2016 referendum on EU membership. He was selected as the Conservative candidate for Hitchin and Harpenden in 2017 following the announcement that the sitting Conservative MP, Peter Lilley, was to stand down. Afolami has described Winston Churchill as his "biggest hero".

In 2018, Afolami was named one of the Franco-British Council's Young Leaders. In January that year, it was reported that Afolami had claimed £2,000 in expenses for subscription to the European Research Group. In April, Afolami was a member of the delegation to Beijing for the tenth Anniversary Leadership Forum, led by David Lidington. The Forum, entitled "Partners for Progress: Strengthening the UK-China relationship in the Golden Era", aimed to discuss practical cooperation between the UK and China.

In September 2021, Afolami was appointed parliamentary private secretary to the Foreign Secretary, Liz Truss. In November 2021 he was appointed parliamentary private secretary to the Secretary of State for Digital, Culture, Media and Sport, Nadine Dorries, and served in this role until his appointment as Vice Chairman of the Conservative Party for Youth in February 2022.

Afolami served as Chair of PRASEG, the all-party parliamentary group on Renewable and Sustainable energy, until November 2023, when he resigned on being appointed as Economic Secretary to the Treasury. Afolami was also the Chair of the All-Party Parliamentary Group on Credit Unions and a Commissioner for the Financial Inclusion Commission, a financial inclusion campaign group.

He is active in supporting charities and other voluntary groups. He is patron of Harpenden Spotlight on Africa a charity working in health and education in rural Uganda. He is also patron of GRIT (Growing Resilience in Teens) and Tilehouse Counselling, two mental health charities in his constituency. Afolami also sits on the advisory board of the Social Market Foundation and on the Programme Committee of the Ditchley Foundation.

On 5 July 2022, whilst being interviewed live on television, Afolami resigned from his role as Vice Chair of the Conservative Party, owing to recent scandals in government under Boris Johnson.

Afolami is a member of the Franco - British Colloque, which is a long-running political conference that serves as a platform for discussions between British and French leaders and business executives.

In March 2023, Afolami announced that he would be contesting the new Hitchin constituency at the 2024 general election, following the 2023 review of constituency boundaries.

Afolami contested the Hitchin constituency at the 2024 general election, but lost the seat to Alistair Strathern of the Labour Party.

=== Ministerial career ===
In November 2023, Afolami was appointed as Economic Secretary to the Treasury and City Minister – the mid level ministerial role responsible for financial services. He is the youngest person ever appointed to the latter role. His appointment was widely welcomed by leading City figures due to his experience in the financial services industry both before entering parliament and whilst on the backbenches.

== Post-parliamentary career ==
In January 2025, Afolami was appointed as Chief of Staff and Strategy at Acrisure, the large American financial services business.

He was also appointed to the board of HSBC UK in January 2025, aged 38, the youngest director of a bank in the United Kingdom.

== Works ==
- Afolami, Bim (September 2023). "Gamal Abdel Nasser". In Dale, Iain (ed.). The Dictators. 64 Dictators, 64 Authors, 64 Warnings from History. Hodder & Stoughton.
- Afolami, Bim (September 2023). "William III". In Dale, Iain (ed.). Kings and Queens: 1200 Years of English and British Monarchs. Hodder & Stoughton.
- Afolami, Bim; Payne, Sebastian; Blagden, James (May 2023). "Missing Millennials" (PDF). Onward.
- Hughes, Steve (April 2023). "Foreword". The Purpose of Regulation: Improving accountability of our regulators to get a better deal for consumers, businesses, and the United Kingdom (PDF) (Report). Regulatory Reform Group.
- Afolami, Bim; Stevenson, Janet; Jones, Fay; Hart, Sally-Ann; Fletcher, Katherine; Street, Andy; et al. (January 2023). Levelling Up 2.0: A Blueprint for the Future. Curia.
- Afolami, Bim; Crowhurst, Mike (November 2022). "Banking for Britain: The role of financial services in Levelling-Up" (PDF). All-Party Parliamentary Group on Financial Markets and Services & Services.
- Afolami, Bim; Trott, Laura (February 2021). "Accelerator Zones: how to turbocharge economic opportunity across the UK". Social Market Foundation. Social Market Foundation.
- Afolami, Bim (February 2021). "The Role of Parliament in the Future Regulatory Framework for Financial Services" (PDF). All-Party Parliamentary Group on Financial Markets and Services & Services.
- Afolami, Bim (June 2020). "Unlocking Britain: Recovery and Renewal after Covid-19" (PDF). Social Market Foundation.
- Afolami, Bim (15 May 2018). "Making New Housing Popular".

Parliament of the United Kingdom
Preceded by Peter Lilley	Member of Parliament for Hitchin and Harpenden; 2017–2024	Constituency abolished
