= Harpenden and Berkhamsted =

UK Parliament constituency (since 2024)

- County constituency for the House of Commons
- Interactive map of boundaries since 2024
- Location within the East of England
- County: Hertfordshire
- Electorate: 71,635 (March 2020)
- Major settlements: Harpenden, Berkhamsted and Tring

Current constituency
- Created: 2024
- Member of Parliament: Victoria Collins (Liberal Democrats)
- Seats: One
- Created from: Hitchin and Harpenden & South West Hertfordshire

Harpenden and Berkhamsted is a constituency of the House of Commons in the UK Parliament. It was established by the 2023 review of Westminster constituencies and was first contested at the 2024 general election. It is represented by Victoria Collins of the Liberal Democrats.

== Constituency profile ==
The Harpenden and Berkhamsted constituency is located in Hertfordshire. Its largest town is Harpenden, which has a population of around 31,000. The constituency also includes the towns of Berkhamsted and Tring and the villages of Wheathampstead and Redbourn. The Chiltern Hills pass between Berkhamsted and Tring. The area is popular with commuters to London and is well-connected to the city by rail. The constituency is highly affluent with very low levels of deprivation. The average house price is more than double the nationwide average.

In general, residents are older and well-educated compared to the rest of the country. They have high levels of income and homeownership, and a high proportion of residents work in professional and scientific occupations. White people made up 92% of the population at the 2021 census. At the local council level, most of the constituency is represented by Liberal Democrats with some Conservatives elected in the rural areas between Harpenden and Berkhamsted. Voters in the constituency strongly supported remaining in the European Union in the 2016 referendum; an estimated 61% voted to remain compared to the nationwide figure of 48%.

== Boundaries ==
Taking into account the local government boundary review in the City of St Albans which came into effect in May 2022, the constituency is composed of the following from the 2024 general election:

- The Borough of Dacorum wards of Aldbury and Wigginton, Ashridge, Berkhamsted Castle, Berkhamsted East, Berkhamsted West, Northchurch, Tring Central, Tring East, Tring West and Rural, and Watling.
- The City of St Albans wards of Harpenden East, Harpenden North & Rural, Harpenden South, Harpenden West, Marshalswick East & Jersey Farm (part), Redbourn, Sandridge & Wheathampstead, and small parts of the Marshalswick West, St Stephen and Verulam wards.

It covers the following areas:

- Harpenden, Redbourn, Sandridge and Wheathampstead, transferred from the abolished constituency of Hitchin and Harpenden
- Berkhamsted and Tring, transferred from South West Hertfordshire
- A sparsely populated rural area connecting the above two areas, transferred from Hemel Hempstead

== Members of Parliament ==
Hitchin & Harpenden and South West Hertfordshire prior to 2024

Election	Member	Party
2024	Victoria Collins	Liberal Democrats

== Elections ==
=== Elections in the 2020s ===
General election 2024: Harpenden and Berkhamsted
Party	Candidate	Votes	%	±%
Liberal Democrats	Victoria Collins	27,282	50.2	+24.9
Conservative	Nigel Gardner	16,574	30.5	−21.8
Reform	Saba Poursaeedi	4,245	7.8	N/A
Labour	Zara Layne	4,061	7.5	−3.1
Green	Paul de Hoest	1,951	3.6	+2.0
SDP	Mark Patten	223	0.4	N/A
Majority		10,708	19.7	N/A
Turnout		54,336	75.2	–2.6
Registered electors		72,242		
Liberal Democrats gain from Conservative		Swing	+23.4	

=== Elections in the 2010s ===
2019 notional result
Party	Vote	%
Conservative	29,136	52.3
Liberal Democrats	14,092	25.3
Labour	5,908	10.6
Others	5,695	10.2
Green	907	1.6
Turnout	55,738	77.8
Electorate	71,635	

== See also ==
- parliamentary constituencies in Hertfordshire
- List of parliamentary constituencies in the East of England (region)
