= Nikki da Costa =

British political advisor and activist

Nikki Da Costa is a British political advisor and activist. She was a special adviser serving as the director of legislative affairs in 10 Downing Street for two Prime Ministers: Theresa May from September 2017 until November 2018, and again for Boris Johnson from July 2019 to August 2021, when she was heavily involved in the unlawful prorogation of parliament.

In 2017 she established the legislative affairs unit at the UK prime minister's office. She stated the unit “serves a strategic purpose: to nurture the prime minister’s political capital, anticipate legislative hurdles, and proactively manage the government’s agenda”. Further sources state the Legislative Affairs Unit “was responsible for ‘building bridges with the parliamentary party’ and planning the legislative timetable”

She was also active in negotiating through parliament the EU Withdrawal Act 2018 coordinating agreements within Whitehall and Parliament. Additionally, da Costa was heavily cited in the High Court case regarding the unlawful prorogation of parliament in 2019, having provided written advice to the then Prime Minister Boris Johnson that the prorogation should take place. She was named one of the 100 most influential women in the UK by The House in 2020.

Between her stints in Number 10, da Costa worked in public affairs, through the Cicero Group. Since leaving No 10 she has worked as a specialist partner with Flint Global lobbying firm and now is Director of Legislative Affairs at Hogan Lovells. She alongside Mercy Muroki was an unpaid "Policy Fellow" to the Minister for Women and Equalities, Kemi Badenoch for 2023–24. She was involved in contesting the Scottish Government’s Gender Recognition Reform Bill, providing reasons for intervention to the UK Government.

Da Costa has occasionally written op-eds and other articles reflecting on her time in government and giving advice. She wrote in The Times in January 2022 regarding Partygate that Number 10 had "failed as a collective" to follow the COVID-19 lockdown standards it had set.

She was the Conservative candidate in North East Hertfordshire at the 2024 general election. She was defeated by Labour's candidate Chris Hinchliff. Most recently she has been active campaigning against the Assisted Dying Bill, arguing the private members bill process to be an insufficient method to legislate for the issue.
