= West Hertfordshire =

UK Parliament constituency (1983–1997)

- Former county constituency for the House of Commons
- West Hertfordshire in Hertfordshire, showing boundaries used from 1983–1997
- County: Hertfordshire

1983–1997
- Seats: One
- Created from: Hemel Hempstead
- Replaced by: Hemel Hempstead and South West Hertfordshire

West Hertfordshire was a parliamentary constituency in Hertfordshire. It returned one Member of Parliament (MP) to the House of Commons of the Parliament of the United Kingdom by the first-past-the-post system. The constituency name was used from the 1983 general election, when the Hemel Hempstead constituency was renamed "West Hertfordshire", to the 1997 general election, when the "Hemel Hempstead" name was restored.

== History ==
The constituency was created for the 1983 general election from the majority of the abolished seat of Hemel Hempstead, although the town of Berkhamsted was removed to South West Hertfordshire. It was in turn abolished for the 1997 general election, with the town of Tring being transferred to South West Hertfordshire and the remaining areas forming the re-established Hemel Hempstead constituency.

Although the predecessor seat Hemel Hempstead had voted Conservative by almost 5000 votes in 1979, with the removal of the strongly Conservative-voting town of Berkhamsted it was estimated that the new seat would have notionally voted Labour in 1979 by around 700 votes. However, like many Home Counties New Town seats, it swung strongly towards Margaret Thatcher's Conservatives in their 1983 landslide election victory (with Labour falling to third place), and was won by the Tories by significant margins (ranging from 15% to 23%) at all three general elections of its existence.

Its main successor seat of (the revived) Hemel Hempstead would be regained (after favourable boundary changes) by Labour in 1997 amid their national landslide victory.

== Boundaries ==
The District of Dacorum wards of Adeyfield East, Adeyfield West, Aldbury and Wigginton, Ashridge, Bennetts End, Boxmoor, Central, Chaulden, Crabtree, Cupid Green, Flamstead and Markyate, Gadebridge, Grove Hill, Highfield, Leverstock Green, Nash Mills, South, Tring Central, Tring East, Tring West, and Warners End.

The main settlements in the constituency were Hemel Hempstead and Tring.

== Members of Parliament ==
Election	Member	Party
1983	Robert Jones	Conservative
1997	constituency abolished: see Hemel Hempstead & South West Hertfordshire	

== Election results ==
1979 notional result
Party	Vote	%
Labour	28,354	46.0
Conservative	27,671	44.9
Liberal	5,075	8.2
Others	518	0.8
Turnout	61,618	
Electorate		

=== Elections in the 1980s ===
General election 1983: Hertfordshire West
Party	Candidate	Votes	%	±%
Conservative	Robert Jones	28,436	46.7	+1.8
SDP	Nicholas Hollinghurst	18,860	31.0	+22.7
Labour	Paul Boateng	13,583	22.3	−23.7
Majority		9,486	15.6	N/A
Turnout		60,879	79.4	
Registered electors		76,597		
Conservative gain from Labour		Swing	+10.5	

General election 1987: Hertfordshire West
Party	Candidate	Votes	%	±%
Conservative	Robert Jones	31,760	49.7	+3.0
SDP	Nicholas Hollinghurst	16,836	26.3	−4.6
Labour	Tony McBrearty	15,317	24.0	+1.7
Majority		14,924	23.4	+7.6
Turnout		63,913	80.9	+1.5
Registered electors		78,966		
Conservative hold		Swing	−3.8	

=== Elections in the 1990s ===
General election 1992: Hertfordshire West
Party	Candidate	Votes	%	±%
Conservative	Robert Jones	33,340	51.5	+1.8
Labour	Eryl McNally	19,400	30.0	+6.0
Liberal Democrats	Martin Trevett	10,464	16.2	−10.2
Green	James Hannaway	674	1.0	New
National Front	John McAuley	665	1.0	New
Natural Law	Guy Harvey	175	0.3	New
Majority		13,940	21.5	−1.8
Turnout		64,718	82.4	+1.4
Registered electors		78,573		
Conservative hold		Swing	−2.1	

== See also ==
- Parliamentary constituencies in Hertfordshire
