= North East Hertfordshire =

UK Parliament constituency (since 1997)

Coordinates: 51°55′N 0°02′W

- County constituency for the House of Commons
- Interactive map of boundaries since 2024
- Location within the East of England
- County: Hertfordshire
- Electorate: 76,849 (March 2020)
- Major settlements: Letchworth, Baldock and Royston

Current constituency
- Created: 1997
- Member of Parliament: Chris Hinchliff (Labour)
- Seats: One
- Created from: Hertfordshire North, Hertford and Stortford, Stevenage

North East Hertfordshire is a constituency (Note: A county constituency (for the purposes of election expenses and type of returning officer)) represented in the House of Commons of the UK Parliament since 2024 by Chris Hinchliff of the Labour Party. (Note: As with all constituencies, the constituency elects one Member of Parliament (MP) by the first past the post system of election at least every five years.) On 16 July 2025, Hinchliff was suspended by Labour for "persistent breaches of party discipline". He sat as an independent, until November 2025 when he had the whip restored.

== Constituency profile ==
North East Hertfordshire is a constituency in Hertfordshire in the East of England. Its largest town is Letchworth, which has a population of around 35,000. Other settlements include the towns of Baldock, Royston and Buntingford and the village of Puckeridge.

This is a mostly rural constituency with many small villages. Letchworth, officially Letchworth Garden City, was designed and built in the early 20th century as part of the garden city movement. Baldock, Royston and Buntingford are small, historic market towns. The A1(M) motorway and the Cambridge line connect the area to London, which is located around 32 miles (51 km) to the south. Letchworth has an average level of wealth whilst the other towns and villages are generally affluent, giving the constituency a below-average rate of deprivation overall. House prices here are higher than the regional and national averages.

North East Hertfordshire has high proportion of older working-age adults and retirees and a low proportion of young adults. In general, residents are well-educated and have above-average rates of homeownership. Household income is high and the child poverty rate is around half the UK-wide figure.> A high proportion of residents work in professional occupations, particularly in the retail and manufacturing sectors, and a low percentage claim unemployment benefits. White people made up 91% of the population at the 2021 census.

Local politics are diverse. At the local council level, Baldock and most of Letchworth are represented by the Labour Party, Royston and the southern suburbs of Letchworth by Liberal Democrats, Buntingford by Greens and the rural villages by Conservatives. North East Hertfordshire is estimated to have been 50/50 split on the question of remaining in or leaving the European Union in the 2016 referendum, compared to the UK-wide result of 52% in favour of Brexit.

== History ==
The constituency was created for the 1997 general election largely from parts of the abolished constituency of North Hertfordshire, including Letchworth, Baldock and Royston. It also included rural areas of the District of East Hertfordshire transferred from Hertford and Stortford and Stevenage.

The seat had been held since its creation for the Conservative Party with comfortable majorities by Sir Oliver Heald, who was previously MP for North Hertfordshire.

Heald did not contest the 2024 general election, the seat was won by Labour candidate Chris Hinchliff, a councillor on North Herts District Council for Royston Palace.

== Boundaries and boundary changes ==
=== Historic ===
==== 1997–2010 ====
- The District of North Hertfordshire wards of Arbury, Baldock, Grange, Letchworth East, Letchworth South East, Letchworth South West, Newsells, Royston East, Royston West, Sandon, Weston, and Wilbury; and
- The District of East Hertfordshire wards of Braughing, Buntingford, Cottered, Little Hadham, Munden, Standon St Mary, Stapleford, Tewin, Thundridge, and Watton-at-Stone.

==== 2010–2024 ====
- The District of North Hertfordshire wards of Arbury, Baldock East, Baldock Town, Ermine, Letchworth East, Letchworth Grange, Letchworth South East, Letchworth South West, Letchworth Wilbury, Royston Heath, Royston Meridian, Royston Palace, and Weston and Sandon; and
- The District of East Hertfordshire wards of Braughing, Buntingford, Hertford Rural North, Hertford Rural South, Little Hadham, Mundens and Cottered, Puckeridge, Thundridge and Standon, Walkern, and Watton-at-Stone.

Minor changes due to revision of local authority wards.

=== Current ===
The 2023 review of Westminster constituencies, which was based on the ward structures in place on 1 December 2020, left the boundaries virtually unchanged. However, following local government boundary reviews in East Hertfordshire and North Hertfordshire which came into effect in May 2023 and May 2024 respectively, the constituency now comprises the following from the 2024 general election:

- The District of East Hertfordshire wards or part wards of: Aston, Datchworth & Walkern (Bennington and Walkern parishes); Braughing & Standon; Buntingford; Hertford Rural; Little Hadham & The Pelhams; The Mundens; Ware Rural (Thundridge parish); Watton-at-Stone.
- The District of North Hertfordshire wards of: Arbury; Baldock East; Baldock West; Ermine; Letchworth Grange; Letchworth Norton; Letchworth South East; Letchworth South West; Letchworth Wilbury; Royston Heath, Royston Meridian, Royston Palace; Weston & Sandon.

== Members of Parliament ==
Hertfordshire North, Hertford & Stortford and Stevenage prior to 1997

Election	Member	Party
1997	Sir Oliver Heald	Conservative
2024	Chris Hinchliff	Labour
July 2025	Chris Hinchliff	Independent
November 2025	Chris Hinchliff	Labour

== Elections ==
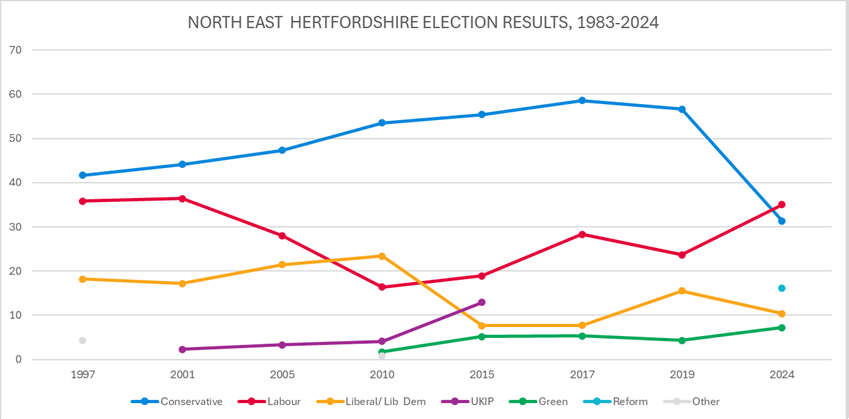
North East Hertfordshire election results 1983–2024

=== Elections in the 2020s ===
General election 2024: North East Hertfordshire
Party	Candidate	Votes	%	±%
Labour	Chris Hinchliff	18,358	35.0	+11.3
Conservative	Nikki da Costa	16,435	31.3	−25.3
Reform	Steven Adelantado	8,462	16.1	New
Liberal Democrats	Ruth Brown	5,463	10.4	−5.1
Green	Vicky Burt	3,802	7.2	+2.9
Majority		1,923	3.7	N/A
Turnout		52,520	67.6	−5.1
Registered electors		77,090		
Labour gain from Conservative		Swing	+18.3	

=== Elections in the 2010s ===
General election 2019: North East Hertfordshire
Party	Candidate	Votes	%	±%
Conservative	Oliver Heald	31,293	56.6	−2.0
Labour	Kelley Green	13,104	23.7	−4.6
Liberal Democrats	Amy Finch	8,563	15.5	+7.8
Green	Tim Lee	2,367	4.3	−1.0
Majority		18,189	32.9	+2.6
Turnout		55,327	72.7	−0.7
Conservative hold		Swing	+1.3	

General election 2017: North East Hertfordshire
Party	Candidate	Votes	%	±%
Conservative	Oliver Heald	32,587	58.6	+3.2
Labour	Doug Swanney	15,752	28.3	+9.4
Liberal Democrats	Nicky Shepard	4,276	7.7	+0.1
Green	Tim Lee	2,965	5.3	+0.1
Majority		16,835	30.3	−6.2
Turnout		55,764	73.4	+2.7
Conservative hold		Swing	−3.1	

General election 2015: North East Hertfordshire
Party	Candidate	Votes	%	±%
Conservative	Oliver Heald	28,949	55.4	+1.9
Labour	Chris York	9,869	18.9	+2.5
UKIP	William Compton	6,728	12.9	+8.8
Liberal Democrats	Joe Jordan	3,952	7.6	−15.8
Green	Mario May	2,789	5.2	+3.5
Majority		19,080	36.5	+6.4
Turnout		52,500	70.7	+0.9
Conservative hold		Swing	−0.3	

General election 2010: North East Hertfordshire
Party	Candidate	Votes	%	±%
Conservative	Oliver Heald	26,995	53.5	+6.2
Liberal Democrats	Hugh Annand	11,801	23.4	+2.0
Labour	David Kirkman	8,291	16.4	−11.6
UKIP	Adrianne Smyth	2,075	4.1	+0.8
Green	Rosemary Bland	875	1.7	New
Independent	Richard Campbell	209	0.4	New
Your Right To Democracy Party Limited	David Ralph	143	0.3	New
Independent	Philip Reichardt	36	0.1	New
Majority		15,194	30.1	+10.8
Turnout		50,425	69.8	+3.2
Conservative hold		Swing		

=== Elections in the 2000s ===
General election 2005: North East Hertfordshire
Party	Candidate	Votes	%	±%
Conservative	Oliver Heald	22,402	47.3	+3.2
Labour	Andy Harrop	13,264	28.0	−8.4
Liberal Democrats	Iain Coleman	10,147	21.4	+4.2
UKIP	David Hitchman	1,561	3.3	+1.0
Majority		9,138	19.3	+11.6
Turnout		47,374	65.6	+0.6
Conservative hold		Swing	+5.8	

General election 2001: North East Hertfordshire
Party	Candidate	Votes	%	±%
Conservative	Oliver Heald	19,695	44.1	+2.4
Labour	Ivan Gibbons	16,251	36.4	+0.6
Liberal Democrats	Alison Kingman	7,686	17.2	−1.0
UKIP	Malcolm Virgo	1,013	2.3	New
Majority		3,444	7.7	+1.8
Turnout		44,645	65.0	−12.1
Conservative hold		Swing		

=== Elections in the 1990s ===
General election 1997: North East Hertfordshire
Party	Candidate	Votes	%	±%
Conservative	Oliver Heald	21,712	41.7	
Labour	Ivan Gibbons	18,624	35.8	
Liberal Democrats	Stephen Jarvis	9,493	18.2	
Referendum	Jonathan Grose	2,166	4.2	
Majority		3,088	5.9	
Turnout		51,995	77.1	
Conservative win (new seat)				

Note: Although a Conservative win due to the seat being newly created, the winning candidate was the previous MP for North Hertfordshire, which was abolished and largely reformed as North East Hertfordshire.

== See also ==
- List of parliamentary constituencies in Hertfordshire
- List of parliamentary constituencies in the East of England (region)
