= Melanie Johnson =

British Labour politician (born 1955)

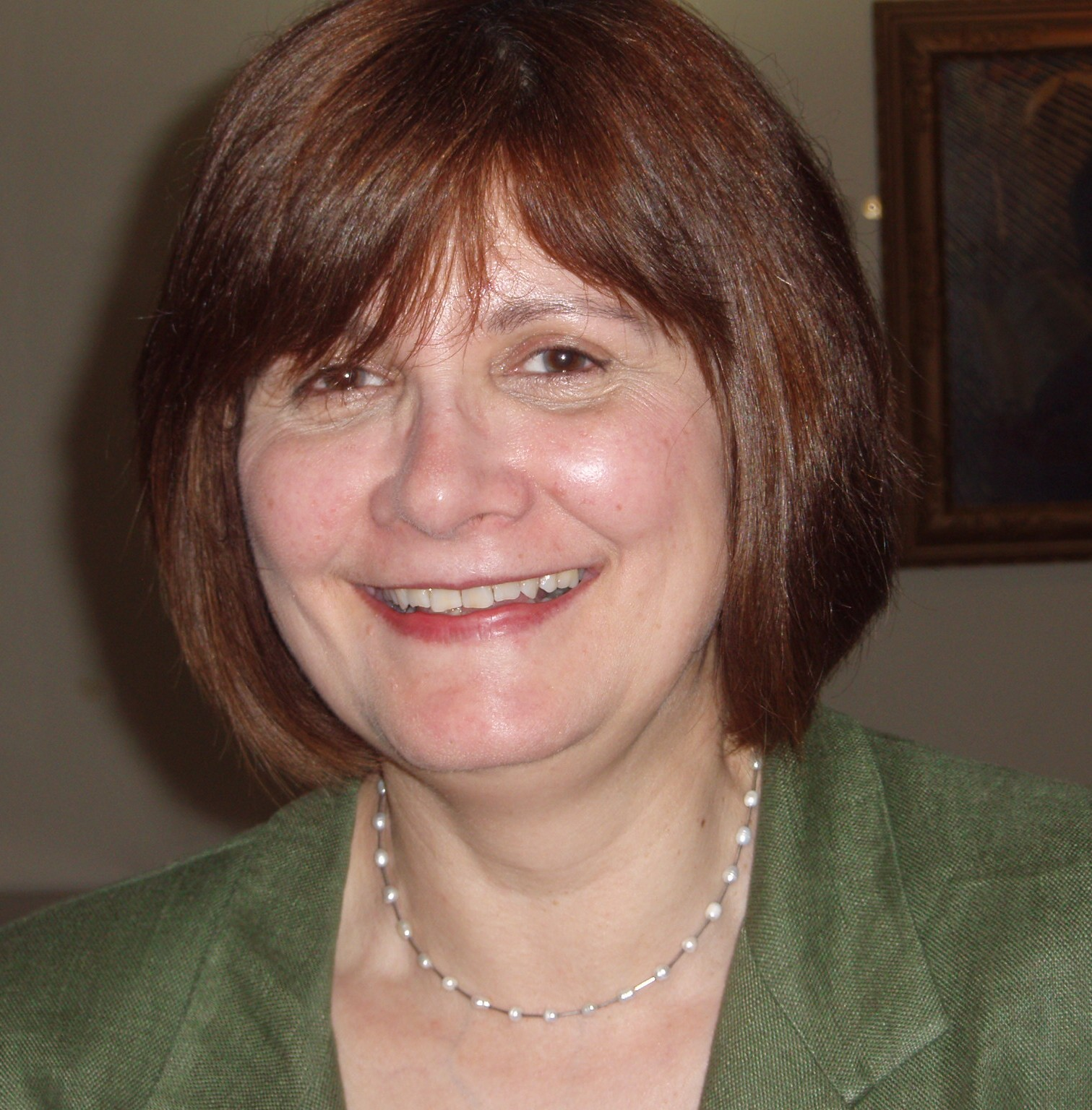
- Johnson in 2009

Minister of State for Public Health
- In office 13 June 2003 – 10 May 2005
- Prime Minister: Tony Blair
- Preceded by: David Lammy
- Succeeded by: Caroline Flint

Parliamentary Under-Secretary of State for Competition and Consumer Affairs
- In office 8 June 2001 – 13 June 2003
- Prime Minister: Tony Blair
- Preceded by: Kim Howells
- Succeeded by: Nigel Griffiths

Economic Secretary to the Treasury
- In office 17 May 1999 – 8 June 2001
- Prime Minister: Tony Blair
- Preceded by: Patricia Hewitt
- Succeeded by: Ruth Kelly

Member of Parliament for Welwyn Hatfield
- In office 1 May 1997 – 11 April 2005
- Preceded by: David Evans
- Succeeded by: Grant Shapps

Personal details
- Born: Melanie Jane Johnson; 5 February 1955 (age 71) Ipswich, Suffolk, England
- Party: Labour
- Children: 3
- Education: University College London, King's College, Cambridge

Melanie Jane Johnson (born 5 February 1955) is a Labour politician in the United Kingdom. She was a Member of Parliament (MP) from 1997 to 2005 and served as a minister in the government of Tony Blair.

== Early life ==
Johnson was born in Ipswich. She attended the Independent Clifton High School in Clifton, Bristol. Leaving Bristol for London, she studied at University College London, gaining a BA in Philosophy and Ancient Greek (1976). Following this she moved to Cambridge, continuing to study Philosophy at postgraduate level at King's College, Cambridge. From the age of 19 onwards she was an active member of the Labour Party and for over a decade was a County Councillor. From 1981 to 1988, she was Member Relations Officer for Cambridge Co-op, then Retail Administration Manager from 1988 to 1990. She was Assistant General Manager in Quality Assurance for Cambridge Family Health Service Authority from 1990 to 1992. Johnson was a schools inspector for Ofsted from 1993 to 1997.

== Parliamentary career ==
In 1994 Johnson unsuccessfully stood for Labour in the Cambridgeshire seat at the European Parliamentary election. Two years later she was selected to stand for Labour in the United Kingdom Parliament through an all-women shortlist.

She was first elected in the 1997 election overturning a majority of 6,583. Johnson won her seat, Welwyn Hatfield, following a statement made by her opponent, David Evans, which made national newspaper headlines. Evans was taped by sixth-form students (at Stanborough School, Welwyn Garden City) denouncing Johnson as "a single girl, lives with her boyfriend, three bastard children" and saying she had "never done a proper job". At this time Johnson was working as a school inspector and living with her partner of 18 years, raising their young family. In this taped statement Evans claimed Johnson did not "have a chance in hell". Evans also criticised her for living in Cambridge rather than actually in his then constituency.

In her maiden speech Johnson commented that Evans was "widely renowned for his plain speaking" but could be "personally very charming. I saw that for myself on election night when he congratulated me on my victory in Welwyn Hatfield and recorded how much he had enjoyed being a Member of Parliament". She further commented "I am a firm believer in diversity and my own style will be a little different from his. As a mother of three, I can assure the House that my children will help to keep my feet on the ground."

Johnson was re-elected in the 2001 elections with a reduced majority. Welwyn Hatfield had never previously been held for more than one term by a Labour MP.

From 1999 to 2005 Johnson was a junior minister serving first as Economic Secretary to the Treasury, next in the Department of Trade and Industry (DTI) as Minister for Competition and Consumers, and finally as Minister for Public Health in the Department of Health. Johnson was also responsible for the White Paper Building Trust in Statistics. As Economic Secretary she supported the EU action against money laundering stating "Money laundering is a very serious offence, with the capacity to undermine financial markets and to corrupt professional advisers" Following the 2000 Budget Johnson, whilst speaking to NPI Conference, commented "in the Budget three weeks ago now, this Government took the next steps towards our ambition for a Britain of opportunity and security not just for a few but for all, with prosperity reaching the people and places the economy has too long forgotten.". Journalist Benedict Brogan likened the delivery of her speeches to "the read-your-weight manner of a supermarket Tannoy" describing them as tedious and accusing her of just repeating "the mantra that had been programmed into her".

During Johnson's time in DTI she gained media coverage for her concerns regarding "US regulators (having) the power to monitor, investigate and discipline UK auditors". Johnson was also responsible for Government's Enterprise Bill, commenting that 'We will provide a robust regime for dealing with those who abuse their creditors.'

After being diagnosed with breast cancer in 2001 Johnson became more vocal on the issue, stating "Breast cancer can happen to any woman, regardless of who she is. I am acutely aware it is something many women still do not believe will happen to them." Cancer was later to become one of Johnson's responsibilities as Public Health Minister.

As Public Health Minister, her responsibilities included policy on smoking, obesity, drugs, alcohol, diet and nutrition, communicable diseases, sexual health, sustainable development and health inequalities. One of her key roles was to improve cervical smear testing, which she achieved in a move to get new better smear tests. With the new test Johnson introduced, there were less false positives, meaning fewer women were now required to return for a second smear due to an error with their first test. Johnson additionally announced plans in 2004 to cut domestic violence during pregnancy with the integration of routine enquiries into antenatal appointments.

Johnson campaigned to cut salt levels, setting targets to significantly reduce salt in foods in order to improve cardiovascular health. She gained credit from "salt victims" who had suffered strokes supporting her work to make large companies reduce salt. Johnson's campaign was echoed by Food watchdogs, whilst she pushed for large food companies to make specific action plans in order to reduce salt.

In October 2003, Johnson was the subject of criticism when she was quoted as saying that fluoridation of water should be "the preferred method of preventing tooth decay on a population basis". Simon Thomas accused her of suggesting people should throw away their toothbrushes, Thomas stated the proposals were "crazy" and "full of contradictions". Others such as Martyn Shrewsbury accused her of failing to consider the health risk of fluoride as well as the ethics of medicating people against their will. Johnson later clarified her comments stating "we are not saying that people should stop brushing their teeth".

Johnson was defeated in the 2005 general election by Grant Shapps on a 9.2% swing to the Conservatives.

== Post parliamentary work ==
In 2006 Johnson took the position of Deputy Chair on the Customer Impact Panel, an Association of British Insurers organisation dedicated to improving the customers' experience of the insurance industry.

In 2009 Johnson was named Chair of the UK Cards Association, a payments industry body, in which capacity she has attempted to have scientific research on credit card security withdrawn from public availability.

She featured on the Labour's shortlist for the 2007 Sedgefield by-election but failed to be selected as candidate. She also made the all-female longlist for the Walthamstow seat in 2008 but was less successful and did not make the shortlist. In 2009 she made a third attempt at becoming a Labour parliamentary candidate by featuring on a controversial all-woman shortlist for the Erith and Thamesmead constituency. The contest was taken over by the central Labour party as the local party was considered incapable of handling the process fairly, leading to complaints that non local candidates were being favoured. Further controversy came when it was revealed one of the ballot boxes had been tampered with at Labour's head office.

== Personal life ==
She lives in Cambridge with her partner. They have twin daughters, and a son.

In 2001 Johnson was diagnosed with breast cancer. Despite treatment for breast cancer, it was reported that Johnson was "expected to spend about 10 days recovering at home in her Welwyn and Hatfield constituency after the operation before returning to work before Christmas, the DTI said." She later commented that she had been "very fortunate to make a full recovery" from breast cancer.

Parliament of the United Kingdom
Preceded by David Evans	Member of Parliament for Welwyn Hatfield; 1997–2005	Succeeded by Grant Shapps
Political offices
Preceded by Patricia Hewitt	Economic Secretary to the Treasury; 1999–2001	Succeeded by Ruth Kelly
