= Andrew Lewin =

British politician (born 1987)

Andrew Lewin MP
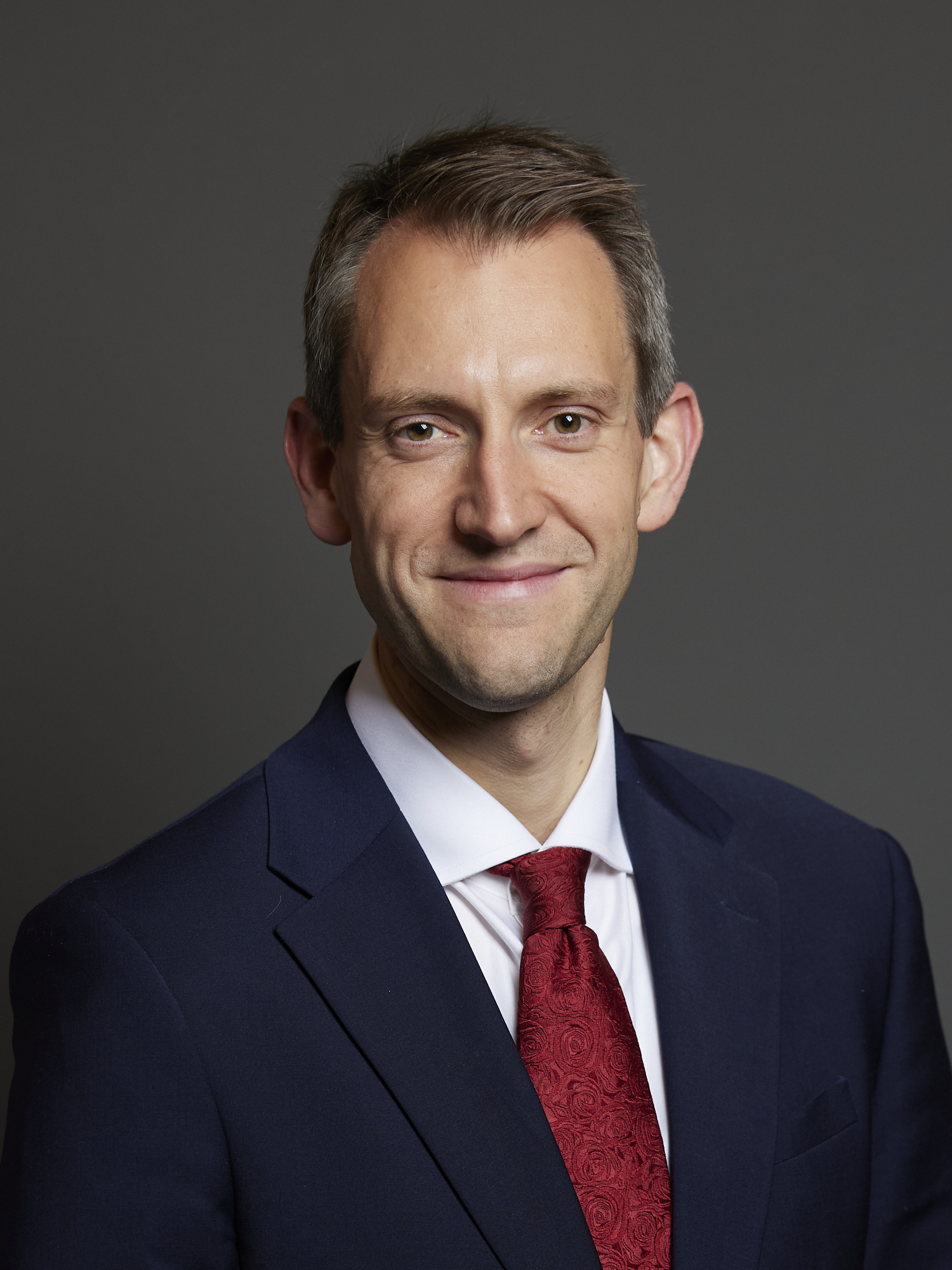
- Official portrait, 2024

Member of Parliament for Welwyn Hatfield
- Incumbent
- Assumed office 4 July 2024
- Preceded by: Grant Shapps
- Majority: 3,799 (7.8%)

Personal details
- Born: Andrew Alan Lewin; 7 January 1987 (age 39) Welwyn Garden City, Hertfordshire, England
- Party: Labour (since 2010)
- Other political affiliations: Liberal Democrats (2003–2010)
- Children: 2
- Education: University of York (BA)
- Website: andrewlewin.co.uk

Andrew Alan Lewin (born 7 January 1987) is a British Labour Party politician who has been the Member of Parliament (MP) for Welwyn Hatfield since the 2024 general election.

== Early life and education ==
Lewin was born on 7 January 1987 at the original Queen Elizabeth II Hospital in Welwyn Garden City, Hertfordshire. He attended The Bishop's Stortford High School from 1998 to 2005 before graduating from the University of York with a BA in Politics in 2008.

== Political career ==
Lewin joined the Liberal Democrats in 2003, while still at secondary school. He was selected as the Liberal Democrat parliamentary candidate for Hertford and Stortford in October 2009. In the 2010 general election, 23-year-old Lewin, the youngest Lib Dem candidate in England, lost to Mark Prisk of the Conservative Party by a margin of 15,437 votes. In November 2010, Lewin joined the Labour Party, citing his dissatisfaction with the decisions of Liberal Democrat leader Nick Clegg and the coalition government, specifically the trebling of university tuition fees, as his reason.

In response to the 2016 Brexit referendum, Lewin founded the pro-European group Remain Labour in 2017 and ran the group until its dissolution in 2021. He endorsed Jess Phillips in the 2020 Labour leadership election. Lewin was selected as the Labour Party parliamentary candidate for Welwyn Hatfield by members of the constituency Labour Party in March 2023. He won the constituency in the 2024 general election, defeating the incumbent Conservative Grant Shapps by a margin of 3,799 votes. Lewin was sworn in by solemn affirmation, rather than an oath, on 10 July.

In November 2024, Lewin was elected Chair of the all-party parliamentary group on Cricket. The following month, he was elected Chair of the UK Trade and Business Commission and the all-party parliamentary group on New Towns. In April 2025, Lewin was elected to the Housing, Communities and Local Government Committee. In September 2025, he announced his support for Bridget Phillipson in the Labour Party deputy leadership election. During the leadership crisis in May 2026, Lewin called for his colleagues to back prime minister Keir Starmer and "get on with the job", calling a potential leadership challenge "a trap" in the context of the Iran war. Lewin later signed a letter calling for unity around Starmer within the Labour Party. Following Starmer's resignation, Lewin nominated Andy Burnham to succeed Starmer in the leadership election.

== Political positions ==
=== Brexit ===
Lewin has previously campaigned in favour of remaining in the European Union (EU). He cited his reasons for setting up Remain Labour as being due to his belief that "Brexit would hit hardest those who have least." He also said it was the responsibility of the Labour party to stand against a project which he said would do "most damage" to the "poorest communities."

Ahead of the 2019 general election, Lewin called for a "Remain Alliance" consisting of Labour, the Liberal Democrats and the Greens to be formed in opposition to Prime Minister Boris Johnson. He said that the prospect of a no-deal Brexit was "motivation enough" to form the alliance, and called on the parties to recognise that they had "more in common" instead of exaggerating their differences "for party gain".

In an article Lewin wrote for LabourList in June 2022, he said that many wearily "read reports that prove beyond doubt that Brexit has set us back" and said that the impact was seen in communities; citing a 6% rise in food prices as being "directly attributed" to leaving the EU. He called on Labour to make an "early manifesto pledge" to not rejoin the EU in its first term in power, saying that any proposal would "consume" a first-term Labour government and potentially "play into the hands of the Conservatives", and also stated that he thought it was "inconceivable" that all EU member states would welcome the UK back into the EU. He also called on Labour to set out priority for cooperation with the EU regarding scientific research, climate change and energy security, and also to commit to a stronger trading relationship with the EU ahead of the next general election.

=== Electoral reform ===
Lewin voted to switch to the alternative vote in the 2011 referendum. In January 2025, Lewin expressed support for proportional representation to be used for general elections, though he stated he believed the "vital link" between MPs and their constituencies should be preserved. He stated his support for a referendum in the next parliament to switch to a proportional system.

=== Russia and Ukraine ===
Lewin supported Ukraine following Russia's invasion in 2022, attending a vigil in support of Ukraine in February 2023. In February 2025, he criticised U.S. president Donald Trump for opening peace negotiations with Russia without the involvement of Ukraine, calling it "a dangerous moment" and stating that peace "should only come on terms agreed by President Zelenskyy".

=== Israel and Palestine ===
In February 2024, Lewin expressed support for a two-state solution and a humanitarian ceasefire in the Gaza war. Following the ceasefire agreement in January 2025, he expressed his support for foreign secretary David Lammy's statement, adding that there was "real hope that the cycle of violence and destruction will end". In July 2025, following prime minister Keir Starmer's commitment to recognising Palestinian statehood at the September 2025 meeting of the United Nations General Assembly unless Israel agrees to a ceasefire, Lewin stated "what is happening in Gaza is a humanitarian catastrophe and the actions of Netanyahu's government are indefensible".

== Personal life ==
As of 2023, Lewin was reported as living in Welwyn Garden City with his wife and two sons. He worked at Clarion Housing Group from 2017 until his election to Parliament in 2024. At Clarion, Lewin was initially the head of external communications until his promotion in 2021 to director of communications, a role he held until becoming an MP.

== Electoral performance ==
=== House of Commons ===
General election 2024: Welwyn Hatfield
Party	Candidate	Votes	%	±%
Labour	Andrew Lewin	19,877	41.0	+9.3
Conservative	Grant Shapps	16,078	33.2	−19.4
Reform	Jack Aaron	6,397	13.2	New
Liberal Democrats	John Munro	3,117	6.4	−6.3
Green	Sarah Butcher	2,986	6.2	+3.1
Majority		3,799	7.8	N/A
Turnout		48,455	64.6	−4.9
Labour gain from Conservative		Swing	+14.4	

General election 2010: Hertford and Stortford
Party	Candidate	Votes	%	±%
Conservative	Mark Prisk	29,810	53.8	+3.6
Liberal Democrats	Andrew Lewin	14,373	26.0	+7.5
Labour	Stephen Terry	7,620	13.8	–10.5
UKIP	David Sodey	1,716	3.1	+1.0
BNP	Roy Harris	1,297	2.3	N/A
Independent	Loucas Xenophontos	325	0.6	N/A
Independent	Martin Adams	236	0.4	N/A
Majority		15,437	27.8	+1.4
Turnout		55,377	70.6	+4.1
Conservative hold		Swing	–1.9	

Parliament of the United Kingdom
Preceded by Grant Shapps	Member of Parliament for Welwyn Hatfield; 2024–present	Incumbent
