= Rowland Ingram-Johnson =

The Ven Rowland Theodore Ingram-Johnson
- Anglican Archdeacon of Grenada
- Church: Church of England
- See: Windward Isles
- In office: 1922–1927
- Previous posts: Incumbent at St Faith, Edmonton

Personal details
- Born: 30 July 1877 Radwell
- Died: 12 August 1964 (aged 87) Woking

Rowland Theodore Ingram-Johnson, MA (30 July 1877 in Radwell – 12 August 1964 in Woking) was an Anglican priest in the twentieth century.

He was educated at St Edmund’s School, Canterbury and Selwyn College, Cambridge; and ordained in 1902. He held curacies in Huddersfield, Maidenhead and Blagdon he was sent to Canada with the SPG to work under the Bishop of Calgary in Alberta. In 1922 he became Archdeacon of Grenada, a post he held until 1927 when he became Rector of St John, Barbados. He was then Vicar of Kimpton from 1928 to 1948.
