= 2021 North Hertfordshire District Council election =

2021 UK local government election

← 2019	6 May 2021	2022 →

17 of 49 seats on North Hertfordshire District Council 25 seats needed for a majority
	First party	Second party	Third party
	Con	Lab	LD
Leader	David Levett	Martin Stears-Handscomb	Paul Clark
Party	Conservative	Labour	Liberal Democrats
Seats before	22	16	11
Seats after	23	15	11
Seat change	▲1	▼1	Steady
Popular vote	14,518	9,402	6,978
Percentage	41.5%	26.9%	20.0%
Leader before election
Martin Stears-Handscomb
Labour
No overall control
Leader after election
Elizabeth Dennis-Harburg
Labour
No overall control

Map showing the results of the 2021 North Hertfordshire District Council election

The 2021 North Hertfordshire District Council election took place on 6 May 2021 to elect 17 of the 49 members of North Hertfordshire District Council in England. This was on the same day as other local elections around the country. This election had originally been due to take place in May 2020, but was postponed due to the COVID-19 pandemic.

The council remained under no overall control, with a Labour and Liberal Democrat coalition continuing to run the council. Martin Stears-Handscomb, leader of the Labour group and leader of the council prior to the election, lost his seat at this election; he had chosen to contest Letchworth South East rather than the Hitchin Oughton seat he had previously held, which put him directly challenging the Conservative leader, David Levett, who retained the seat. Elizabeth Dennis-Harburg was appointed new leader of the Labour group and leader of the council after the election, with the Liberal Democrat leader, Paul Clark, continuing to serve as deputy leader of the council.

== Overall results ==
The overall results were as follows:

2021 North Hertfordshire District Council election
Party	This election			Full council			This election		
Party	Seats	Net	Seats %	Other	Total	Total %	Votes	Votes %	+/−
Conservative	10	▲1	58.8	13	23	46.9	14,518	41.5	+5.5
Labour	5	▼1	29.4	10	15	30.6	9,402	26.9	+5.1
Liberal Democrats	2	Steady	11.8	9	11	22.4	6,978	20.0	-8.4
Green	0	Steady	0.0	0	0	0.0	3,730	10.7	+0.1
Independent	0	Steady	0.0	0	0	0.0	167	0.5	New
Reform UK	0	Steady	0.0	0	0	0.0	59	0.2	New
CPA	0	Steady	0.0	0	0	0.0	53	0.2	New
SDP	0	Steady	0.0	0	0	0.0	39	0.1	New

== Ward results ==
The results for each ward were as follows. Where the previous incumbent was standing for re-election they are marked with an asterisk(*). A double dagger(‡) indicates a sitting councillor contesting a different ward.

=== Baldock East ===
Baldock East
Party	Candidate	Votes	%	±%
Conservative	Juan Timothy Cowell	495	42.9	−3.0
Liberal Democrats	Richard William Winter	302	26.2	−0.3
Labour	Leo James Chapman	212	18.4	+6.6
Green	Jane Louise Turner	133	11.5	+6.9
Majority		193	16.7	
Turnout		1,154	49.4	+4.2
Conservative hold		Swing	-1.3	

Changes from the 2016 election.

=== Baldock Town ===
Baldock Town
Party	Candidate	Votes	%	±%
Conservative	Michael Edwin Weeks*	1,120	48.0	−3.4
Labour Co-op	Alistair Kieran Oliver Willoughby	734	31.4	+13.9
Liberal Democrats	Steven Paul Thomas (Steve Thomas)	242	10.4	−8.7
Green	Timothy Peter Lee (Tim Lee)	223	9.6	−1.4
Majority		386	16.5	
Turnout		2,335	40.6	+8.6
Conservative hold		Swing	-8.7	

=== Chesfield ===
Chesfield
Party	Candidate	Votes	%	±%
Liberal Democrats	Terence Clive Tyler* (Terry Tyler)	728	42.3	+18.5
Conservative	Dominic John Crean Griffiths	727	42.2	+0.3
Labour	Thomas Patrick Luke Hogan (Tom Hogan)	251	14.6	−1.4
Majority		1	0.1	
Turnout		1,721	32.6	+5.2
Liberal Democrats hold		Swing	+9.1	

The result was initially a tie, with Terry Tyler (Liberal Democrat) and Dominic Griffiths (Conservative) both receiving 727 votes; they drew straws for an extra tie-break vote.

=== Hitchin Bearton ===
Hitchin Bearton
Party	Candidate	Votes	%	±%
Labour Co-op	Ian Clive Albert*	1,314	49.0	−4.7
Conservative	Ralph Gerald Muncer	586	21.9	+6.6
Green	Anni Elke Sander	383	14.3	+0.6
Liberal Democrats	Jonathan Clayden	378	14.1	−2.2
Majority		728	27.2	
Turnout		2,681	41.6	+7.2
Labour Co-op hold		Swing	-5.7	

=== Hitchin Highbury ===
Hitchin Highbury
Party	Candidate	Votes	%	±%
Liberal Democrats	Paul Clark*	1,416	48.1	−14.1
Conservative	Gulshan Deep Singh Mangat	820	27.9	+7.2
Labour	Angela Jean Griggs	412	14.0	+4.6
Green	Deolinda Maria Eltringham	242	8.2	+1.2
CPA	Leigh Smith	33	1.1	New
Majority		596	20.3	
Turnout		2,941	46.9	+5.0
Liberal Democrats hold		Swing	-10.6	

=== Hitchin Oughton ===
Hitchin Oughton
Party	Candidate	Votes	%	±%
Labour Co-op	Nigel David Mason	501	38.6	−15.6
Conservative	Steven Patmore	369	28.4	−0.2
Green	Mary Karin Marshall	245	18.9	+11.3
Liberal Democrats	Thomas James Grunshaw	101	7.8	−1.4
Independent	Jacqueline Mary McDonald	65	5.0	New
Majority		132	10.2	
Turnout		1,298	35.0	+3.7
Labour Co-op hold		Swing	-7.7	

Changes from the 2018 election.

=== Hitchin Priory ===
Hitchin Priory
Party	Candidate	Votes	%	±%
Conservative	Richard Arthur Charles Thake*	787	41.8	+0.9
Liberal Democrats	Rajeni Bhakar (Raj Bhakar)	548	29.1	−2.6
Labour	Peter Malcolm Taylor	286	15.2	−3.9
Green	Desmond Peter Stephens (Des Stephens)	233	12.4	+4.7
CPA	Sidney Clifford Cordle (Sid Cordle)	20	1.1	New
Majority		239	12.7	
Turnout		1,885	49.5	+4.0
Conservative hold		Swing	+1.8	

Changes from the 2018 election.

=== Hitchin Walsworth ===
Hitchin Walsworth
Party	Candidate	Votes	%	±%
Labour Co-op	Elizabeth Louise Dennis-Harburg*	1,154	41.2	−3.2
Conservative	Charles Laing	1,042	37.2	+11.7
Liberal Democrats	Elizabeth Julie Townsend (Liz Townsend)	301	10.7	−0.6
Green	Samuel Rex Larsen (Sam Larsen)	293	10.5	−7.1
Majority		112	4.0	
Turnout		2,802	44.5	+7.4
Labour Co-op hold		Swing	-7.5	

=== Hitchwood, Offa and Hoo ===
Hitchwood, Offa and Hoo
Party	Candidate	Votes	%	±%
Conservative	Claire Patricia Annette Strong*	1,436	52.2	−2.5
Green	Adina Claire	787	28.6	+11.5
Labour	Anton Jungreuthmayer	304	11.1	−1.3
Liberal Democrats	Philippa Wright	214	7.8	−6.7
Majority		649	23.6	
Turnout		2,751	46.4	+10.3
Conservative hold		Swing	-7.0	

=== Knebworth ===
Knebworth
Party	Candidate	Votes	%	±%
Conservative	Amanda Benhilda Tandi (Mandi Tandi)	1,235	56.5	+16.9
Liberal Democrats	Susana Muñoz Maniega	629	28.8	−22.3
Labour	Douglas Arthur Jenner (Doug Jenner)	185	8.5	+0.9
Green	Davina Ruth Malcolm	97	4.4	+2.9
Majority		606	27.7	
Turnout		2,187	52.1	+5.1
Conservative hold		Swing	+19.6	

Changes from the 2018 election.

=== Letchworth East ===
Letchworth East
Party	Candidate	Votes	%	±%
Labour Co-op	Ian Mantle*	711	44.2	−7.2
Conservative	James Durston	467	29.0	+4.2
Green	David Paul Morris	205	12.7	+8.0
Liberal Democrats	Mark Robert Patrick Spencer	115	7.2	−0.5
Independent	Paul Ross	102	6.3	−4.4
Majority		244	15.2	
Turnout		1,608	35.9	+1.0
Labour Co-op hold		Swing	-5.7	

Changes from the 2018 election.

=== Letchworth Grange ===
Letchworth Grange
Party	Candidate	Votes	%	±%
Conservative	Simon Nicholas Bloxham	1,059	47.7	+9.8
Labour Co-op	Sean Nolan	733	33.0	+2.8
Green	Elizabeth Susan Hancock	215	9.7	+0.5
Liberal Democrats	Amy Elizabeth Finch	200	9.0	−1.0
Majority		326	14.7	
Turnout		2,222	39.4	+5.0
Conservative gain from Labour Co-op		Swing	+3.5	

=== Letchworth South East ===
Letchworth South East
Party	Candidate	Votes	%	±%
Conservative	David Charles Levett*	966	46.1	+3.5
Labour Co-op	Martin John Stears-Handscomb ‡	726	34.7	−8.6
Liberal Democrats	Paul Anthony James Marment	175	8.4	New
Green	Hazel Tracy Middleton	155	7.4	New
Reform UK	Garry Edward Warren	59	2.8	New
Majority		240	11.5	
Turnout		2,094	39.0	+0.1
Conservative hold		Swing	+6.1	

=== Letchworth South West ===
Letchworth South West
Party	Candidate	Votes	%	±%
Conservative	Terence William Hone* (Terry Hone)	1,276	45.8	+11.2
Liberal Democrats	Phillip Christopher Weeder (Phil Weeder)	724	26.0	−8.6
Labour Co-op	Thomas Joseph Plater (Tom Plater)	474	17.0	+4.9
Green	Alan Edmund Borgars	245	8.8	+0.1
SDP	Michael McGetrick	39	1.4	New
Majority		552	19.8	
Turnout		2,787	46.0	+7.1
Conservative hold		Swing	+9.9	

=== Letchworth Wilbury ===
Letchworth Wilbury
Party	Candidate	Votes	%	±%
Labour Co-op	Amy Dawn Allen	771	53.1	−4.9
Conservative	Monica Madeline Bloxham	536	36.9	+10.2
Liberal Democrats	Sally Margaret Jarvis (Sal Jarvis)	121	8.3	+3.3
Majority		235	16.2	
Turnout		1,452	36.1	−1.6
Labour Co-op hold		Swing	-7.6	

Changes from the 2018 election.

This Letchworth Wilbury seat had been previously held by Labour councillor Deepak Sangha, but had been vacant since his resignation in March 2020, but no by-election could be held due to the COVID-19 pandemic.

=== Royston Meridian ===
Royston Meridian (by-election)
Party	Candidate	Votes	%	±%
Conservative	Adam Compton	889	49.0	+1.7
Liberal Democrats	Alexander William Prosser-Snelling (Alex Prosser-Snelling)	579	31.9	+8.9
Labour	John Ivor Rees	176	9.7	−0.2
Green	Hugh David Parker	154	8.5	−1.0
Majority		310	17.1	
Turnout		1,816	42.8	+6.9
Conservative hold		Swing	-3.6	

The Royston Meridian by-election was triggered by the resignation of Conservative councillor Bill Davidson.

=== Royston Palace ===
Royston Palace (by-election)
Party	Candidate	Votes	%	±%
Conservative	Sarah Anne Dingley	708	47.0	+9.2
Labour Co-op	Catherine Jayne Brownjohn (Cathy Brownjohn)	458	30.4	−2.7
Liberal Democrats	Hugo John Rainey	205	13.6	−0.8
Green	Steven Andrew Turner	120	8.0	−5.6
Majority		250	16.6	
Turnout		1,507	34.3	+5.7
Conservative hold		Swing	+5.9	

The Royston Palace by-election had been triggered by the resignation of Conservative councillor Ben Lewis, who had resigned in March 2020, but no by-election could be held until 2021 due to the COVID-19 pandemic.

== By-elections ==
=== Hitchin Highbury ===
The Hitchin Highbury by-election was triggered by the death of Liberal Democrat councillor Paul Clark, who was his party's group leader and deputy leader of the council. The Liberal Democrats retained the seat. Ruth Brown was appointed new leader of the Liberal Democrat group and deputy leader of the council following Paul Clark's death.

Hitchin Highbury: 10 March 2022
Party	Candidate	Votes	%	±%
Liberal Democrats	Raj Bhakar	1,238	67.0	+18.5
Conservative	Samuel Forsyth	450	24.3	−3.7
Green	Deolinda Eltringham	134	7.2	−1.0
CPA	Leigh Smith	27	1.5	+0.3
Majority		788	42.7	
Turnout		1,861	30.0	
Liberal Democrats hold		Swing	+11.1	
