= 2022 North Hertfordshire District Council election =

← 2021	5 May 2022	2023 →

18 out of 49 seats to North Hertfordshire District Council 25 seats needed for a majority
	First party	Second party	Third party
Leader	Claire Strong	Elizabeth Dennis-Harburg	Ruth Brown
Party	Conservative	Labour	Liberal Democrats
Seats before	23	15	11
Seats won	4	9	5
Seats after	19	17	13
Seat change	▼4	▲2	▲2
Popular vote	10,927	10,032	9,807
Percentage	33.5%	30.8%	30.1%
Swing	▼8.0%	▲3.9%	▲10.1%
- Winner of each seat at the 2022 North Hertfordshire District Council election
Leader before election
Elizabeth Dennis-Harburg
Labour
No overall control
Leader after election
Elizabeth Dennis-Harburg
Labour
No overall control

The 2022 North Hertfordshire District Council election took place on 5 May 2022 to elect 18 of the 49 members of North Hertfordshire District Council in England. This was on the same day as other local elections around the country. The council remained under no overall control, with a Labour and Liberal Democrat coalition continuing to run the council. The leader of the council remained the Labour group leader, Elizabeth Dennis-Harburg, and the deputy leader of the council remained the Liberal Democrat group leader, Ruth Brown.

== Results summary ==
2022 North Hertfordshire District Council election
Party	This election			Full council			This election		
Party	Seats	Net	Seats %	Other	Total	Total %	Votes	Votes %	+/−
Conservative	4	▼4	22.2	15	19	38.8	10,927	33.5	-8.0
Labour	9	▲2	50.0	8	17	34.7	10,032	30.8	+3.9
Liberal Democrats	5	▲2	27.8	8	13	26.5	9,807	30.1	+10.1
Green	0	Steady	0.0	0	0	0.0	1,698	5.2	-5.5
CPA	0	Steady	0.0	0	0	0.0	70	0.2	±0.0
Independent	0	Steady	0.0	0	0	0.0	48	0.1	-0.4
Heritage	0	Steady	0.0	0	0	0.0	32	0.1	New

== Ward results ==
The results for each ward were as follows. Where the previous incumbent was standing for re-election they are marked with an asterisk(*).

=== Baldock Town ===
Baldock Town
Party	Candidate	Votes	%	±%
Labour Co-op	Alistair Kieran Oliver Willoughby	871	40.6	+8.9
Conservative	Harvey William Baker	806	37.6	−10.7
Green	Timothy Peter Lee (Tim Lee)	224	10.5	+0.9
Liberal Democrats	Stephen Paul Thomas (Steve Thomas)	210	9.8	−0.6
Heritage	Michelle Carine Dray	32	1.5	N/A
Majority		65	3.0	
Turnout		2,150	37.9	
Labour Co-op gain from Conservative		Swing	▲9.8	

=== Codicote ===
Codicote
Party	Candidate	Votes	%	±%
Conservative	Ian Robert Moody*	519	59.0	+2.0
Labour	Daniel Ian Wright-Mason	250	28.4	+13.6
Liberal Democrats	Roger Ian King	110	12.5	+7.2
Majority		269	30.6	
Turnout		883	41.9	
Conservative hold		Swing	▼5.8	

=== Hitchin Bearton ===
Hitchin Bearton
Party	Candidate	Votes	%	±%
Labour Co-op	Valerie Ann Bryant* (Val Bryant)	1,238	54.1	+4.7
Conservative	Anthony Patrick Strong (Tony Strong)	367	16.0	−6.0
Liberal Democrats	Jonathan Daniel Clayden	358	15.6	+1.4
Green	Anni Elke Sander	326	14.2	−0.2
Majority		871	38.1	
Turnout		2,303	36.1	
Labour Co-op hold		Swing	▲5.4	

=== Hitchin Highbury ===
Hitchin Highbury
Party	Candidate	Votes	%	±%
Liberal Democrats	Samuel Peter William Collins* (Sam Collins)	1,790	67.4	+19.0
Conservative	Samuel William Forsyth (Sam Forsyth)	549	20.7	−7.4
Labour	Angela Jean Griggs	281	10.6	−3.5
CPA	Leigh Smith	35	1.3	+0.2
Majority		1,241	46.7	
Turnout		2,660	42.7	
Liberal Democrats hold		Swing	▲13.2	

=== Hitchin Oughton ===
Hitchin Oughton
Party	Candidate	Votes	%	±%
Labour Co-op	Clare Helen Billing*	663	58.8	+19.7
Conservative	Sarah Jane Free	263	23.3	−5.5
Liberal Democrats	Susana Muñoz Maniega	167	14.8	+6.9
CPA	Sidney Clifford Cordle (Sid Cordle)	35	3.1	N/A
Majority		400	35.5	
Turnout		1,130	31.1	
Labour Co-op hold		Swing	▲12.6	

=== Hitchin Priory ===
Hitchin Priory
Party	Candidate	Votes	%	±%
Liberal Democrats	Christopher Francis Lucas (Chris Lucas)	1,080	58.3	+29.1
Conservative	Dominic John Crean Griffiths	530	28.6	−13.4
Labour	Peter Malcolm Taylor	140	7.6	−7.7
Green	Deolinda Maria Eltringham	101	5.5	−6.9
Majority		550	29.7	
Turnout		1,859	49.9	
Liberal Democrats gain from Conservative		Swing	▲21.3	

=== Hitchin Walsworth ===
Hitchin Walsworth
Party	Candidate	Votes	%	±%
Labour Co-op	James Howard Denselow	1,109	45.9	+4.5
Conservative	Nusrat Latif	586	24.3	−13.0
Liberal Democrats	Elizabeth Julie Townsend (Liz Townsend)	377	15.6	+4.8
Green	William Barry Lavin (Will Lavin)	343	14.2	+3.7
Majority		523	21.6	
Turnout		2,428	39.1	
Labour Co-op hold		Swing	▲8.8	

=== Hitchwood, Offa & Hoo ===
Hitchwood, Offa & Hoo
Party	Candidate	Votes	%	±%
Conservative	Faye Susan Frost*	1,196	52.9	+0.5
Liberal Democrats	Marilyn Margaret Parkin	672	29.7	+21.9
Labour	David James Winstanley (Dave Winstanley)	395	17.5	+6.4
Majority		524	23.2	
Turnout		2,278	38.0	
Conservative hold		Swing	▼10.7	

=== Kimpton ===
Kimpton
Party	Candidate	Votes	%	±%
Conservative	Ralph Gerald Muncer	349	41.5	−21.7
Liberal Democrats	Nicola Miranda Campbell Jackman (Nicky Jackman)	276	32.9	+18.2
Labour	Douglas Arthur Jenner (Doug Jenner)	106	12.6	−1.8
Green	Davina Ruth Malcolm	61	7.3	−0.4
Independent	John Cyril Bishop*	48	5.7	N/A
Majority		73	8.6	
Turnout		843	47.1	
Conservative hold		Swing	▼20.0	

John Bishop had previously held the Kimpton seat as a Conservative, but resigned from the party shortly before the 2022 election and stood as an independent candidate.

=== Knebworth ===
Knebworth
Party	Candidate	Votes	%	±%
Liberal Democrats	Catherine Lisa Nash* (Lisa Nash)	1,206	60.4	+31.1
Conservative	Lee Jonathan Chapman	621	31.1	−26.4
Labour	Alan Garth Trangmar	170	8.5	±0.0
Majority		585	29.3	
Turnout		2,010	48.4	
Liberal Democrats hold		Swing	▲28.8	

=== Letchworth East ===
Letchworth East
Party	Candidate	Votes	%	±%
Labour Co-op	Tamsin Le Ann Scott Thomas	833	60.5	+16.1
Conservative	Helen Denise Derbyshire	365	26.5	−2.7
Liberal Democrats	Sally Margaret Jarvis (Sal Jarvis)	179	13.0	+5.8
Majority		468	34.0	
Turnout		1,388	31.5	
Labour Co-op hold		Swing	▲9.4	

This Letchworth East seat had been vacant since October 2021 following the resignation of the previous Labour councillor, Sue Ngwala.

=== Letchworth Grange ===
Letchworth Grange
Party	Candidate	Votes	%	±%
Labour Co-op	Daniel Peter Mark Allen*	1,185	58.7	+25.5
Conservative	Stephen Robert Boakes	835	41.3	−6.7
Majority		350	17.4	
Turnout		2,048	36.8	
Labour Co-op hold		Swing	▲16.1	

=== Letchworth South East ===
Letchworth South East
Party	Candidate	Votes	%	±%
Labour Co-op	Sean Nolan	784	40.5	+5.6
Conservative	Andrew Clare	776	40.1	−6.3
Liberal Democrats	Paul Anthony James Marment	248	12.8	+4.4
Green	Hazel Tracy Middleton	126	6.5	−0.9
Majority		8	0.4	
Turnout		1,953	36.8	
Labour Co-op hold		Swing	▲6.0	

=== Letchworth South West ===
Letchworth South West
Party	Candidate	Votes	%	±%
Liberal Democrats	Phillip Christopher Weeder (Phil Weeder)	1,067	41.8	+15.5
Conservative	James Durston	965	37.8	−8.5
Labour	Leo James Chapman	351	13.8	−3.4
Green	Alan Edmund Borgars	169	6.6	−2.3
Majority		102	4.0	
Turnout		2,567	43.0	
Liberal Democrats gain from Conservative		Swing	▲12.0	

=== Letchworth Wilbury ===
Letchworth Wilbury
Party	Candidate	Votes	%	±%
Labour Co-op	Thomas Joseph Plater (Tom Plater)	675	53.5	−0.5
Conservative	Harrison Michael Edwards	352	27.9	−9.6
Green	Ian Huw John Clayfield	147	11.6	N/A
Liberal Democrats	Andrew Ircha	88	7.0	−1.5
Majority		323	25.6	
Turnout		1,269	32.1	
Labour Co-op hold		Swing	▲4.6	

=== Royston Heath ===
Royston Heath
Party	Candidate	Votes	%	±%
Liberal Democrats	Ruth Gillian Brown*	988	54.0	+19.4
Conservative	Mark James Hughes	536	29.3	−5.3
Labour Co-op	Kenneth Garland (Ken Garland)	196	10.7	−1.4
Green	Hugh David Parker	111	6.1	−2.6
Majority		452	24.7	
Turnout		1,853	41.6	
Liberal Democrats hold		Swing	▲12.4	

=== Royston Meridian ===
Royston Meridian
Party	Candidate	Votes	%	±%
Conservative	Adam Compton*	749	43.3	−4.0
Liberal Democrats	Amy Chesterton Di Capite	694	40.2	+17.2
Labour	Stephen Lockett	195	11.3	+1.4
Green	John Briggs Hully	90	5.2	−4.3
Majority		55	3.1	
Turnout		1,734	40.8	
Conservative hold		Swing	▼10.6	

=== Royston Palace ===
Royston Palace
Party	Candidate	Votes	%	±%
Labour Co-op	Christopher Volante Hinchliff (Chris Hinchliff)	590	40.7	+7.6
Conservative	Sarah Anne Dingley*	563	38.8	+1.0
Liberal Democrats	Bryony Clare May	297	20.5	+6.1
Majority		27	1.9	
Turnout		1,468	33.6	
Labour Co-op gain from Conservative		Swing	▲3.3	
