= 2023 North Hertfordshire District Council election =

2023 local government election in North Hertfordshire

← 2022	4 May 2023	2024 →

16 out of 49 seats to North Hertfordshire District Council 25 seats needed for a majority

	First party	Second party	Third party
Leader	Elizabeth Dennis-Harburg	Ruth Brown	Claire Strong
Party	Labour	Liberal Democrats	Conservative
Seats before	17	13	19
Seats after	19	15	15
Seat change	▲2	▲2	▼4
- Winner of each seat at the 2023 North Hertfordshire District Council election
Leader before election
Elizabeth Dennis-Harburg
Labour
No overall control
Leader after election
Elizabeth Dennis-Harburg
Labour
No overall control

The 2023 North Hertfordshire District Council election took place on 4 May 2023 to elect members of North Hertfordshire District Council in Hertfordshire, England. This was on the same day as other local elections across England. The council remained under no overall control.

== Overview ==
The council had been under no overall control since 2019, being run by a Labour and Liberal Democrat coalition. The leader of the council was Labour councillor Elizabeth Dennis-Harburg, who had been leader since 2021.

The council remained under no overall control. Labour overtook the Conservatives to become the largest party on the council for the first time since 1999. The Liberal Democrats took the most votes across the district. The Labour and Liberal Democrat coalition continued running the council after the election.

== Overall results ==
The overall results were:

2023 North Hertfordshire District Council election
Party	This election			Full council			This election		
Party	Seats	Net	Seats %	Other	Total	Total %	Votes	Votes %	+/−
Liberal Democrats	8	▲2	50.0	7	15	30.6	9,237	32.4	+2.3
Conservative	3	▼4	18.8	12	15	30.6	8,622	30.3	-3.2
Labour	5	▲2	31.3	14	19	38.8	7,365	25.9	-4.9
Green	0	Steady	0.0	0	0	0.0	2,140	7.5	+2.3
Independent	0	Steady	0.0	0	0	0.0	778	2.7	+2.6
Reform UK	0	Steady	0.0	0	0	0.0	204	0.7	N/A
CPA	0	Steady	0.0	0	0	0.0	142	0.5	+0.3

== Ward results ==
The Statement of Persons Nominated, which details the candidates standing in each ward, was released by North Hertfordshire District Council following the close of nominations on 5 April 2023. The results for each ward were as follows. An asterisk (*) indicates a sitting councillor standing for re-election, and a double dagger (‡) indicates a sitting councillor contesting a different ward.

=== Arbury ===
Arbury
Party	Candidate	Votes	%	±%
Liberal Democrats	Thomas Wade Tyson* (Tom Tyson)	618	53.7	+2.8
Conservative	Nicola Marianne Da Costa (Nikki Da Costa)	437	38.0	−2.5
Labour	Leo James Chapman	53	4.6	n/a
Green	Davina Ruth Malcolm	42	3.7	−4.2
Majority		181	15.7	
Turnout		1,153	51.04	
Registered electors		2,259		
Liberal Democrats hold		Swing	+2.6	

=== Baldock Town ===
Baldock Town
Party	Candidate	Votes	%	±%
Conservative	Michael Muir*	917	42.8	+5.2
Labour Co-op	James Thomas O'Gorman Toone	774	36.1	−4.5
Liberal Democrats	Stephen Paul Thomas (Steve Thomas)	279	13.0	+3.2
Green	Timothy Peter Lee (Tim Lee)	173	8.1	−2.4
Majority		143	6.7	
Turnout		2,156	38.24	
Registered electors		5,638		
Conservative hold		Swing	+4.8	

=== Cadwell ===
Cadwell
Party	Candidate	Votes	%	±%
Liberal Democrats	Louise Jane Peace	480	56.7	+8.7
Conservative	Christopher Gregson Williams (Chris Williams)	235	27.7	−0.5
Labour	Alan Garth Trangmar	75	8.9	−4.1
Green	Anni Elke Sander	57	6.7	−3.1
Majority		245	29.0	
Turnout		850	43.08	
Registered electors		1,973		
Liberal Democrats hold		Swing	+4.6	

=== Chesfield ===
Chesfield
Party	Candidate	Votes	%	±%
Liberal Democrats	Dominic John Crean Griffiths	697	42.9	+0.6
Conservative	Steven Neil Patmore	509	31.3	−10.9
Labour Co-op	Vijaiya Prashan Poopalasingham	419	25.8	+11.2
Majority		188	11.6	
Turnout		1,636	31.96	
Registered electors		5,119		
Liberal Democrats gain from Conservative		Swing	+5.8	

=== Ermine ===
Ermine
Party	Candidate	Votes	%	±%
Conservative	Gerald Edward Morris*	518	56.2	−3.0
Liberal Democrats	Hugo John Rainey	197	21.4	−1.1
Green	Hugh David Parker	107	11.6	−0.9
Labour	Vaughan West	99	10.7	+5.9
Majority		321	34.8	
Turnout		927	43.24	
Registered electors		2,144		
Conservative hold		Swing	-0.9	

=== Hitchin Bearton ===
Hitchin Bearton
Party	Candidate	Votes	%	±%
Labour Co-op	David James Winstanley (Dave Winstanley)	1,309	55.0	+0.9
Green	Deolinda Maria Eltringham	382	16.1	+1.9
Conservative	Charles Laing	341	14.3	−1.7
Liberal Democrats	Jonathan Clayden	302	12.7	−2.9
CPA	Sidney Clifford Cordle (Sid Cordle)	46	1.9	n/a
Majority		927	38.9	
Turnout		2,384	37.90	
Registered electors		6,290		
Labour hold		Swing	-0.5	

This seat was previously held by Labour councillor Judi Billing, but had been vacant since her death in November 2022.

=== Hitchin Highbury ===
Hitchin Highbury
Party	Candidate	Votes	%	±%
Liberal Democrats	Keith Hoskins*	1,678	62.8	+4.5
Conservative	Ethan Singh Parmar	479	17.9	−10.7
Labour	Angela Jean Griggs	362	13.6	+6.0
Green	Kruna Vukmirovic	113	4.2	−1.3
CPA	Leigh Smith	38	1.4	n/a
Majority		1,199	44.9	
Turnout		2,679	43.27	
Registered electors		6,191		
Liberal Democrats hold		Swing	+7.6	

=== Hitchin Walsworth ===
Hitchin Walsworth
Party	Candidate	Votes	%	±%
Labour Co-op	Daniel Ian Wright-Mason	1,103	49.5	+3.6
Conservative	Samuel William Forsyth (Sam Forsyth)	482	21.6	−2.7
Liberal Democrats	Elizabeth Julie Townsend (Liz Townsend)	312	14.0	−1.6
Green	William Barry Lavin	272	12.2	−2.0
CPA	Asher Smith	58	2.6	n/a
Majority		621	27.9	
Turnout		2,236	36.45	
Registered electors		6,134		
Labour hold		Swing	+3.1	

This seat was previously held by Labour councillor Kay Tart, but had been vacant since her resignation in March 2023.

=== Hitchwood, Offa & Hoo ===
Hitchwood, Offa & Hoo
Party	Candidate	Votes	%	±%
Conservative	David John Barnard*	1,191	50.1	−2.8
Liberal Democrats	Susana Muñoz Maniega	445	18.7	−11.0
Green	Nicola Jane Clark (Nicky Clark)	421	17.7	n/a
Labour	Thomas Patrick Luke Hogan (Tom Hogan)	318	13.4	−4.1
Majority		746	31.4	
Turnout		2,384	39.89	
Registered electors		5,976		
Conservative hold		Swing	+4.1	

=== Letchworth Grange ===
Letchworth Grange
Party	Candidate	Votes	%	±%
Labour Co-op	Daniel Steven Marsh	839	44.2	−14.5
Conservative	Harrison Michael Edwards	608	32.0	−9.3
Green	David Paul Morris	205	10.8	n/a
Liberal Democrats	Sally Margaret Jarvis (Sal Jarvis)	148	7.8	n/a
Reform UK	Steven Adelantado (Steve Adelantado)	100	5.3	n/a
Majority		231	12.2	
Turnout		1,904	34.69	
Registered electors		5,489		
Labour gain from Conservative		Swing	-2.6	

=== Letchworth South East ===
Letchworth South East
Party	Candidate	Votes	%	±%
Labour Co-op	Michael John Debenham (Mick Debenham)	741	38.4	−2.1
Conservative	Andrew Malcolm Clare	711	36.9	−3.2
Liberal Democrats	Paul Anthony James Marment	237	12.3	−0.5
Green	Maryla Josephine Hart	135	7.0	+0.5
Reform UK	Garry Warren	104	5.4	n/a
Majority		30	1.5	
Turnout		1,933	36.85	
Registered electors		5,246		
Labour hold		Swing	+0.6	

=== Letchworth South West ===
Letchworth South West
Party	Candidate	Votes	%	±%
Liberal Democrats	Sean Prendergast*	1,223	46.3	+4.5
Conservative	Morgan William Derbyshire‡	897	33.9	−3.9
Labour	Sadie Rebecca Laura Billing	344	13.0	−0.8
Green	Dugald James Muir	180	6.8	+0.2
Majority		326	12.4	
Turnout		2,657	44.95	
Registered electors		5,911		
Liberal Democrats hold		Swing	+4.2	

The Conservative candidate, Morgan Derbyshire, was the councillor for Letchworth Grange ward prior to this election.

=== Royston Heath ===
Royston Heath
Party	Candidate	Votes	%	±%
Liberal Democrats	Bryony Clare May	954	51.7	−2.3
Conservative	Hammad Baig	394	21.4	−7.9
Independent	Mary Antony	301	16.3	n/a
Labour Co-op	Kenneth Garland (Ken Garland)	195	10.6	−0.1
Majority		560	30.3	
Turnout		1,851	41.35	
Registered electors		4,476		
Liberal Democrats hold		Swing	+2.8	

=== Royston Meridian ===
Royston Meridian
Party	Candidate	Votes	%	±%
Liberal Democrats	Matthew Barnes (Matt Barnes)	847	51.7	+11.5
Conservative	Stephen Robert Boakes	435	26.6	−16.7
Independent	Luke John Haugh	173	10.6	n/a
Labour	Stephen Lockett	130	7.9	−3.4
Green	Desmond Peter Stephens (Des Stephens)	53	3.2	−2.0
Majority		412	25.1	
Turnout		1,647	38.77	
Registered electors		4,248		
Liberal Democrats gain from Conservative		Swing	+14.1	

=== Royston Palace ===
Royston Palace
Party	Candidate	Votes	%	±%
Labour Co-op	Catherine Jayne Brownjohn (Cathy Brownjohn)	549	37.8	−2.9
Conservative	Jean Margaret Green*	364	25.0	−13.8
Independent	Robert Edward Inwood (Rob Inwood)	304	20.9	n/a
Liberal Democrats	Elizabeth Kathleen Mary Freeman	237	16.3	−4.2
Majority		185	12.8	
Turnout		1,456	34.19	
Registered electors		4,259		
Labour gain from Conservative		Swing	+5.4	

=== Weston & Sandon ===
Weston & Sandon
Party	Candidate	Votes	%	±%
Liberal Democrats	Stephen Kenneth Jarvis* (Steve Jarvis)	583	78.6	−0.5
Conservative	Helen Denise Derbyshire	104	14.0	−0.3
Labour	Rhona Ann Cameron	55	7.4	+4.9
Majority		479	64.6	
Turnout		743	45.84	
Registered electors		1,621		
Liberal Democrats hold		Swing	-0.1	
