= 2024 North Hertfordshire District Council election =

2024 local government election in North Hertfordshire

- 2 May 2024

All 51 seats on North Hertfordshire District Council 26 seats needed for a majority

	First party	Second party	Third party
Leader	Elizabeth Dennis	Ruth Brown	David Levett
Party	Labour	Liberal Democrats	Conservative
Last election	19 seats, 25.9%	15 seats, 32.4%	15 seats, 30.3%
Seats won	25	19	7
Seat change	▲6	▲4	▼8
Popular vote	29,564	24,349	22,756
Percentage	35.6%	29.3%	27.4%
Swing	▲9.7%	▼3.1%	▼2.9%
- Winner of each seat at the 2024 North Hertfordshire District Council election
Leader before election
Elizabeth Dennis
Labour
No overall control
Leader after election
Daniel Allen
Labour
No overall control

The 2024 North Hertfordshire District Council election was held on Thursday 2 May 2024 to elect members of North Hertfordshire District Council in Hertfordshire. It was held alongside the other local elections in the United Kingdom. New ward boundaries come into effect for this election, increasing the number of councillors from 49 to 51.

== Summary ==
Prior to the election the council was under no overall control, being led by a coalition of Labour and the Liberal Democrats.

Following the election, the council remained under no overall control. Labour was still the largest party and increased its number of seats, but fell one short of winning an overall majority. The Liberal Democrats also increased their number of seats. The Conservatives were reduced to just seven seats, and their group leader, David Levett, lost his seat. The Conservatives subsequently chose Ralph Muncer to be their new group leader after the election.

Labour also changed its leader after the election. Elizabeth Dennis, who had served as group leader and leader of the council since 2021, was replaced by Daniel Allen. He was formally appointed as the new leader of the council, leading a Labour minority administration, at the subsequent annual council meeting on 23 May 2024.

=== Previous council composition ===
After 2023 election		Before 2024 election		After 2024 election	
Party	Seats	Party	Seats	Party	Seats
Labour	19	Labour	19	Labour	25
Liberal Democrats	15	Liberal Democrats	15	Liberal Democrats	19
Conservative	15	Conservative	15	Conservative	7

=== Election result ===
2024 North Hertfordshire District Council election
Party	Candidates	Seats	Gains	Losses	Net gain/loss	Seats %	Votes %	Votes	+/−
Labour	51	25	6	0	▲6	49.0	35.6	29,564	+9.7
Liberal Democrats	51	19	4	0	▲4	37.3	29.3	24,349	–3.1
Conservative	51	7	0	6	▼8	13.7	27.4	22,756	–2.9
Green	20	0	0	0	Steady	0.0	5.6	4,638	–1.9
Reform	7	0	0	0	Steady	0.0	1.5	1,215	+0.8
CPA	8	0	0	0	Steady	0.0	0.5	410	±0.0
Independent	1	0	0	0	Steady	0.0	0.2	195	–2.5

== Ward results ==
The Statement of Persons Nominated, which details the candidates standing in each ward, was released by North Hertfordshire District Council following the close of nominations on 5 April 2024. The results by ward are as follows.

An asterisk (*) indicates an incumbent councillor standing for re-election.

=== Arbury ===
Arbury
Party	Candidate	Votes	%	±%
Liberal Democrats	Thomas Wade Tyson* (Tom Tyson)	539	51.4	
Conservative	Nicola Marianne Da Costa (Nikki da Costa)	380	36.2	
Labour	Elizabeth Eleanor Oliver (Liz Oliver)	78	7.4	
Green	Anne Fletcher	52	5.0	
Turnout		1,052	46.94	
Registered electors		2,241		
Liberal Democrats hold				

=== Baldock East ===
Baldock East
Party	Candidate	Votes	%	±%
Labour	Rhona Ann Cameron	418	38.8	
Labour	Stewart Robert Willoughby	407	37.8	
Conservative	Lee Henry-John Perrott	366	34.0	
Conservative	Juan Cowell*	323	30.0	
Liberal Democrats	Steven Paul Thomas (Steve Thomas)	289	26.8	
Liberal Democrats	Phillip Christopher Weeder* (Phil Weeder)	281	26.1	
Turnout		1,084	47.50	
Registered electors		2,282		
Labour gain from Conservative				
Labour win (new seat)				

=== Baldock West ===
Baldock West
Party	Candidate	Votes	%	±%
Labour	Alistair Kieran Oliver Willoughby*	1,002	45.7	
Labour	Emma Jane Rowe	960	43.8	
Conservative	Michael Muir*	847	38.6	
Labour	James Thomas O'Gorman Toone	801	36.5	
Conservative	Richard Mark Salt	654	29.8	
Conservative	Andrew Dempster Young	628	28.6	
Green	Kruna Vukmirovic	276	12.6	
Liberal Democrats	David Sims	231	10.5	
Reform	Philippa Mary Clayton (Pippa Clayton)	177	8.1	
Liberal Democrats	James William Barber (Jim Barber)	176	8.0	
Liberal Democrats	Paul Barber	138	6.3	
Turnout		2,199	38.87	
Registered electors		5,658		
Labour win (new seat)				
Labour win (new seat)				
Conservative win (new seat)				

=== Cadwell ===
Cadwell
Party	Candidate	Votes	%	±%
Liberal Democrats	Louise Jane Peace*	360	41.7	−15.0
Conservative	Charles Laing	342	39.7	11.8
Labour	Alan Garth Trangmar	121	14.0	5.1
Green	Roger Nisbet	39	4.5	−2.2
Turnout		864	43.20	
Registered electors		2,000		
Liberal Democrats hold		Swing	-13.4	

=== Codicote and Kimpton ===
Codicote and Kimpton
Party	Candidate	Votes	%	±%
Conservative	Ralph Gerald Muncer*	731	51.0	
Conservative	Steven Neil Patmore	588	41.0	
Labour	Davina Jane Ross-Anderson (Davina Anderson)	382	26.7	
Liberal Democrats	Amy Elizabeth Finch	366	25.5	
Labour	Mark Shepherd Lenthall (Mark Lenthall)	336	23.4	
Liberal Democrats	Marilyn Margaret Parkin	279	19.5	
Turnout		1,439	37.94	
Registered electors		3,793		
Conservative win (new seat)				
Conservative win (new seat)				

=== Ermine ===
Ermine
Party	Candidate	Votes	%	±%
Conservative	Martin Lawrence Prescott	384	45.0	
Liberal Democrats	Hugo John Rainey	310	36.3	
Labour	Thomas Giles Lingard	80	9.4	
Green	Hugh David Parker	80	9.4	
Turnout		866	39.71	
Registered electors		2,181		
Conservative hold				

=== Graveley, St Ippolyts and Wymondley ===
Graveley, St Ippolyts and Wymondley
Party	Candidate	Votes	%	±%
Liberal Democrats	Caroline Jennifer McDonnell	361	44.6	
Liberal Democrats	Dominic John Crean Griffiths*	357	44.1	
Conservative	Michael Frank Goddard	263	32.5	
Conservative	Ian Robert Moody*	232	28.7	
Labour	Inderjit Sunner (Indie Sunner)	129	15.9	
Labour	Gordon Philip White	111	13.7	
Green	Emma Louise Newport	89	11.0	
Turnout		817	39.07	
Registered electors		2,091		
Liberal Democrats win (new seat)				
Liberal Democrats win (new seat)				

=== Great Ashby ===
Great Ashby
Party	Candidate	Votes	%	±%
Labour	Vijaiya Prashan Poopalasingham (VJ Poopalasingham)	546	40.8	
Labour	Laura Jane Williams	520	38.9	
Liberal Democrats	Hayley Michelle Collins	485	36.2	
Liberal Democrats	Sally Margaret Jarvis (Sal Jarvis)	441	33.0	
Conservative	Olusegun Adeola Laniyan (Segun Laniyan)	276	20.6	
Conservative	Michael Hewitt	264	19.7	
Turnout		1,348	33.92	
Registered electors		3,974		
Labour win (new seat)				
Labour win (new seat)				

=== Hitchin Bearton ===
Hitchin Bearton
Party	Candidate	Votes	%	±%
Labour	Ian Clive Albert*	1,484	53.2	
Labour	Valerie Ann Bryant* (Val Bryant)	1,451	52.0	
Labour	David James Winstanley* (Dave Winstanley)	1,383	49.6	
Green	Deolinda Maria Eltringham	510	18.3	
Green	Mary Karin Marshall	502	18.0	
Green	Timothy Peter Lee (Tim Lee)	389	13.9	
Liberal Democrats	Susana Muñoz Maniega	367	13.2	
Liberal Democrats	Joanne Charlotte Collins	363	13.0	
Conservative	Sarah Jane Free	362	13.0	
Conservative	Faye Susan Frost*	326	11.7	
Conservative	Mark Anderson Scott	321	11.5	
Liberal Democrats	Ayan Kumar Halder	285	10.2	
Reform	Charles Spencer Bunker	114	4.1	
CPA	Robert Leslie Adams (Bob Adams)	58	2.1	
CPA	Randy Oluebube Akubue	38	1.4	
CPA	Olubukola Omotayo Cordle (Bukky Cordle)	34	1.2	
Turnout		2,801	41.88	
Registered electors		6,688		
Labour hold				
Labour hold				
Labour hold				

=== Hitchin Highbury ===
Hitchin Highbury
Party	Candidate	Votes	%	±%
Liberal Democrats	Samuel Peter William Collins* (Sam Collins)	1,074	48.8	
Liberal Democrats	Jonathan Daniel Clayden (Jon Clayden)	919	41.7	
Labour	Angela Jean Griggs	544	24.7	
Labour	Thomas Patrick Luke Hogan (Tom Hogan)	456	20.7	
Conservative	William James Robert Dunlop (Will Dunlop)	431	19.6	
Conservative	Gulshan Deep Singh Mangat	374	17.0	
Green	Julie Sharon Rackham	163	7.4	
Reform	David Leal-Bennett	126	5.7	
CPA	Leigh Smith	47	2.1	
Turnout		2,213	46.43	
Registered electors		4,766		
Liberal Democrats hold				
Liberal Democrats hold				

=== Hitchin Oughton ===
Hitchin Oughton
Party	Candidate	Votes	%	±%
Labour	Clare Helen Billing*	846	61.2	
Labour	Nigel David Mason*	787	56.9	
Conservative	Matthew James Robert Ellinger	263	19.0	
Conservative	Michael Ernest Humphrey Leach	220	15.9	
Liberal Democrats	Anne Elizabeth Senechal	212	15.3	
Liberal Democrats	Gary Antony James Hammond	211	15.3	
CPA	Daisy Appoh	56	4.1	
CPA	Hollison James	53	3.8	
Turnout		1,395	34.67	
Registered electors		4,024		
Labour hold				
Labour hold				

=== Hitchin Priory ===
Hitchin Priory
Party	Candidate	Votes	%	±%
Liberal Democrats	Keith Richard Hoskins*	974	46.8	
Liberal Democrats	Christopher Francis Lucas* (Chris Lucas)	820	39.4	
Conservative	Laura Catherine Douglas-Hamilton	543	26.1	
Labour	Susan Eirwen Dearden (Sue Dearden)	538	25.8	
Labour	Christabel Anna Robinson (Bella Callow-Robinson)	483	23.2	
Conservative	Roger Brian Piepenstock	454	21.8	
Green	Grace Woodward	202	9.7	
Turnout		2,090	46.76	
Registered electors		4,470		
Liberal Democrats gain from Conservative				
Liberal Democrats hold				

=== Hitchin Walsworth ===
Hitchin Walsworth
Party	Candidate	Votes	%	±%
Labour	Elizabeth Louise Dennis*	1,256	50.4	
Labour	Donna Catherine Wright	1,188	47.7	
Labour	Daniel Ian Wright-Mason*	1,132	45.4	
Green	William Lavin	576	23.1	
Conservative	Victoria Clare Dunlop	512	20.6	
Liberal Democrats	Elizabeth Julie Townsend (Liz Townsend)	511	20.5	
Liberal Democrats	Andrew Ircha	458	18.4	
Conservative	Adeniyi Adetayo Anthony John-Goodman (Anthony John-Goodman)	456	18.3	
Conservative	Gary Cornwell Morley	443	17.8	
Liberal Democrats	Roger Ian King	387	15.5	
CPA	Sidney Clifford Cordle (Sid Cordle)	91	3.7	
Turnout		2,503	40.08	
Registered electors		6,245		
Labour hold				
Labour hold				
Labour hold				

=== Hitchwood ===
Hitchwood
Party	Candidate	Votes	%	±%
Conservative	Giuseppe Graziano (Joe Graziano)	472	54.5	
Labour	Francis William Carr (Frank Carr)	204	23.6	
Liberal Democrats	Carol Ann Stanier	190	21.9	
Turnout		868	37.27	
Registered electors		2,329		
Conservative win (new seat)				

=== Knebworth ===
Knebworth
Party	Candidate	Votes	%	±%
Liberal Democrats	Catherine Lisa Nash* (Lisa Nash)	997	54.8	
Liberal Democrats	Paul Michael Ward	664	36.5	
Conservative	James Mark Crofts (Jamie Crofts)	595	32.7	
Conservative	Mohammad Mohsin Miah	580	31.9	
Labour	Janet Lynne Gosling (Jan Gosling)	224	12.3	
Labour	Paul William Balbi	176	9.7	
Green	Davina Ruth Malcolm	170	9.3	
Turnout		1,826	44.49	
Registered electors		4,104		
Liberal Democrats hold				
Liberal Democrats gain from Conservative				

=== Letchworth Grange ===
Letchworth Grange
Party	Candidate	Votes	%	±%
Labour	Emma Victoria Fernandes	637	51.4	
Labour	Ian Mantle*	614	49.6	
Conservative	Cory James Bloxham	277	22.4	
Conservative	Harrison Michael Edwards	211	17.0	
Green	Andrew Mark Wallis	160	12.9	
Reform	Steven Adelantado (Steve Adelantado)	154	12.4	
Liberal Democrats	Elizabeth Kathleen Mary Freeman	126	10.2	
Liberal Democrats	Samick Sofat	73	5.9	
CPA	Mark William Webb	33	2.7	
Turnout		1,244	30.16	
Registered electors		4,125		
Labour hold				
Labour hold				

=== Letchworth Norton ===
Letchworth Norton
Party	Candidate	Votes	%	±%
Labour	Daniel Peter Mark Allen*	794	50.0	
Labour	Tina Bhartwas	665	41.9	
Conservative	Simon Nicholas Bloxham*	521	32.8	
Conservative	Morgan William Derbyshire	452	28.4	
Green	David Paul Morris	266	16.7	
Liberal Democrats	Roy Grergory Thompson	187	11.8	
Liberal Democrats	Sharon Ann Weeder	158	9.9	
Turnout		1,599	41.03	
Registered electors		3,897		
Labour win (new seat)				
Labour win (new seat)				

=== Letchworth South East ===
Letchworth South East
Party	Candidate	Votes	%	±%
Labour	Sadie Rebecca Laura Billing	1,067	51.0	
Labour	Tamsin Le Ann Scott Thomas*	995	47.5	
Labour	Michael John Debenham* (Mick Debenham)	937	44.7	
Conservative	David Charles Levett*	583	27.8	
Conservative	James Durston	532	25.4	
Conservative	Hammad Baig	504	24.1	
Green	Maryla Josephine Hart	370	17.7	
Liberal Democrats	Paul Anthony James Marment	317	15.1	
Liberal Democrats	Heather MacMillan	283	13.5	
Liberal Democrats	Barry Peter Neale	172	8.2	
Turnout		2,118	33.13	
Registered electors		6,393		
Labour gain from Conservative				
Labour hold				
Labour hold				

=== Letchworth South West ===
Letchworth South West
Party	Candidate	Votes	%	±%
Liberal Democrats	Sean Prendergast*	1,301	44.6	
Liberal Democrats	Claire Elizabeth Winchester	1,244	42.6	
Liberal Democrats	David Nigel Chalmers	1,197	41.0	
Conservative	Terence William Hone* (Terry Hone)	859	29.4	
Conservative	Stephen Robert Boakes	780	26.7	
Conservative	Andrew Malcolm Clare	765	26.2	
Labour	Rebecca Frances Kirk	456	15.6	
Labour	Martin John Steards-Handscomb	449	15.4	
Labour	Jeryl Carolyn Willoughby	331	11.3	
Green	Dugald James Muir	298	10.2	
Reform	Garry Edward Warren	236	8.1	
Reform	Thomas Gilbert Coates (Tom Coates)	205	7.0	
Reform	Edward Birdsall	203	7.0	
Turnout		2,925	44.99	
Registered electors		6,502		
Liberal Democrats hold				
Liberal Democrats hold				
Liberal Democrats gain from Conservative				

=== Letchworth Wilbury ===
Letchworth Wilbury
Party	Candidate	Votes	%	±%
Labour	Amy Dawn Allen*	739	59.0	
Labour	Sean Nolan*	688	54.9	
Conservative	Monica Madeline Bloxham	267	21.3	
Conservative	Janine Ann Paterson	185	14.8	
Liberal Democrats	David Robert May	150	12.0	
Liberal Democrats	Louise Donna Phillips	150	12.0	
Turnout		1,271	31.42	
Registered electors		4,045		
Labour hold				
Labour hold				

=== Offa ===
Offa
Party	Candidate	Votes	%	±%
Conservative	David John Barnard*	558	46.5	
Conservative	Claire Patricia Annette Strong*	470	39.1	
Liberal Democrats	Neil Stevenson	325	27.1	
Liberal Democrats	Natali Topliff	323	26.9	
Labour	Stewart Rex Bryant	245	20.4	
Labour	Bridget Geraldine Duffy	200	16.7	
Green	Nicola Jane Clark (Nicky Clark)	136	11.3	
Turnout		1,202	42.28	
Registered electors		2,843		
Conservative win (new seat)				
Conservative win (new seat)				

=== Royston Heath ===
Royston Heath
Party	Candidate	Votes	%	±%
Liberal Democrats	Ruth Gillian Brown*	791	56.4	
Liberal Democrats	Bryony Clare May*	690	49.2	
Conservative	Martin David Lewis	326	23.2	
Conservative	Mark Robert Crowley	306	21.8	
Labour	Shirley Maria Clark	213	15.2	
Labour	Kenneth Garland (Ken Garland)	178	12.7	
Green	Desmond Peter Stephens (Des Stephens)	117	8.3	
Turnout		1,412	37.49	
Registered electors		3,766		
Liberal Democrats hold				
Liberal Democrats hold				

=== Royston Meridian ===
Royston Meridian
Party	Candidate	Votes	%	±%
Liberal Democrats	Matthew Barnes* (Matt Barnes)	958	47.4	
Liberal Democrats	Timothy Wesley Johnson (Tim Johnson)	827	40.9	
Liberal Democrats	Elizabeth Ruth Clifton (Ruth Clifton)	796	39.4	
Conservative	Susanna Voronovitskaya (Suzy Brandes)	616	30.5	
Conservative	Callum Lachlan Bartram-Bell	608	30.1	
Conservative	Roman Mamatov	508	25.1	
Labour	Sarah Elizabeth Lucas	396	19.6	
Labour	Vaughan West	395	19.6	
Labour	Stephen Lockett	358	17.7	
Green	Karl John Francis Sedgemore (Francis Sedgemore)	215	10.6	
Turnout		2,032	38.69	
Registered electors		5,252		
Liberal Democrats hold				
Liberal Democrats gain from Conservative				
Liberal Democrats win (new seat)				

=== Royston Palace ===
Royston Palace
Party	Candidate	Votes	%	±%
Labour	Catherine Jayne Brownjohn*	581	40.3	
Labour	Christopher Volante Hinchliff* (Chris Hinchliff)	546	37.9	
Conservative	Jean Margaret Green	376	26.1	
Liberal Democrats	Emma Jane Squire-Smith	362	25.1	
Conservative	Paul Lewis Fletcher	337	23.4	
Liberal Democrats	Gillian Lewis (Gill Lewis)	334	23.2	
Independent	Lisa Jayne Adams	195	13.5	
Turnout		1,466	34.70	
Registered electors		4,167		
Labour hold				
Labour hold				

=== Weston and Sandon ===
Weston and Sandon
Party	Candidate	Votes	%	±%
Liberal Democrats	Stephen Kenneth Jarvis* (Steve Jarvis)	540	78.3	
Conservative	Martin Ingerslev Kristensen	85	12.3	
Labour	Rhys Iwan Lancaster	37	5.4	
Green	Elizabeth Ford (Elizabeth Ryder Ford)	28	4.1	
Turnout		696	42.86	
Registered electors		1,624		
Liberal Democrats hold				

== Changes 2024-2028 ==
=== Affiliation changes ===
May 2025: Emma Rowe elected for Labour in Baldock West left the group to sit as an Independent and Tina Bhartwas elected for Labour in Letchworth Norton left the group to join the Liberal Democrats. Ms Bharwas subsequently resigned her seat leading to a by-election in November 2026.

=== By-elections ===
==== Royston Palace (2024) ====
Royston Palace by-election: 17 October 2024
Party	Candidate	Votes	%	±%
Labour	Sarah Lucas	302	25.9	–12.5
Liberal Democrats	Gill Lewis	298	25.6	+1.7
Conservative	Callum Bartram-Bell	280	24.1	–0.7
Reform	John Froggett	196	16.8	N/A
Green	Peter Wilkin	88	7.6	N/A
Majority		4	0.3	N/A
Turnout		1,166	27.4	–7.3
Registered electors		4,260		
Labour hold		Swing	▼7.1	

Triggered by the resignation of Cllr Chris Hinchliff who had been elected as the MP for North East Hertfordshire in the July 2024 General Election.

==== Letchworth Norton ====
Letchworth Norton by-election: 19 November 2026
Party	Candidate	Votes	%	±%
Labour	Indie Sunner	489	36.0	−8.9
Conservative	Simon Bloxham	310	22.8	−6.6
Liberal Democrats	Tim Oughton	215	15.8	+5.3
Reform	Steve Adelantado	183	13.5	N/A
Green	Hannah Tattersall	111	8.2	−6.8
Restore	Neil Almond	48	3.5	N/A
Majority		179	13.2	N/A
Turnout		1358	34.8	−6.2
Labour hold		Swing		

Triggered by the resignatinon of Cllr Bhartwas.

==== Royston Palace (2026) ====
Royston Palace by-election: 17 December 2026
Party	Candidate	Votes	%	±%
Restore	Neil Almond			
Conservative	Callum Bell			
Green	Ruby Clachan			
Reform	Harrison Edwards			
Liberal Democrats	Alex Prosser-Snelling			
Labour	Jack Risbridger			
Majority				
Turnout				
		Swing		

Triggered by the resignation of Cllr Lucas.

== See also ==
- North Hertfordshire District Council elections
