= Church of All Saints, Radwell =

Church of All Saints
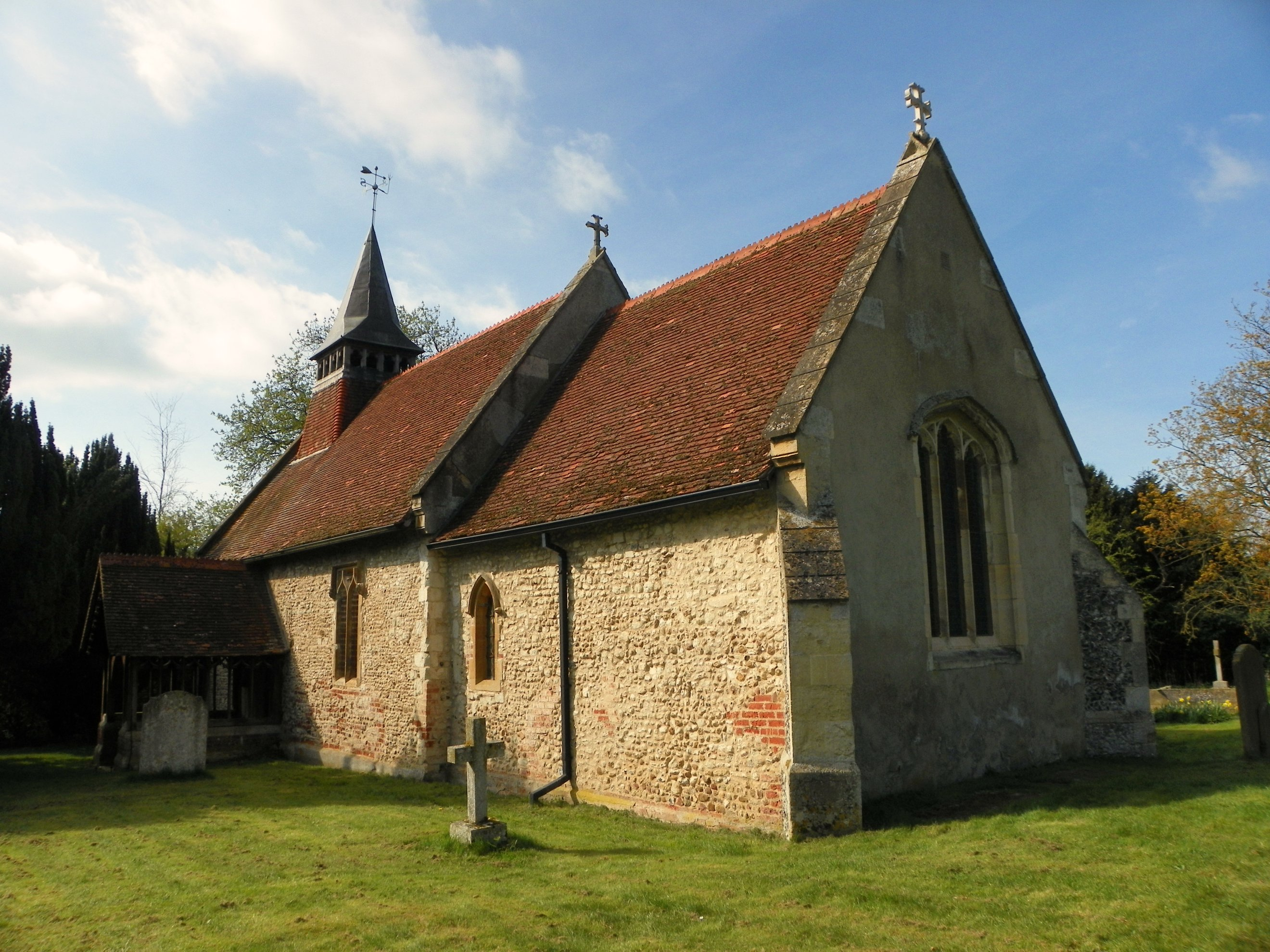
- Church of All Saints in Radwell in Hertfordshire
- Church of All Saints
- 52.00747°N 0.20602°W
- OS grid reference: TL 23235 35856
- Location: Radwell, Hertfordshire
- Country: England
- Denomination: Anglican

History
- Status: Church

Architecture
- Functional status: Active
- Heritage designation: Grade II*
- Designated: 1968
- Years built: 14th-century (current building)

Specifications
- Materials: Flint, clunch

Administration
- Diocese: St Albans

The Church of All Saints in Radwell in Hertfordshire is an Anglican parish church which falls within the Diocese of St Albans. It is a Grade II* listed building, having gained that status in 1968.

== Design ==
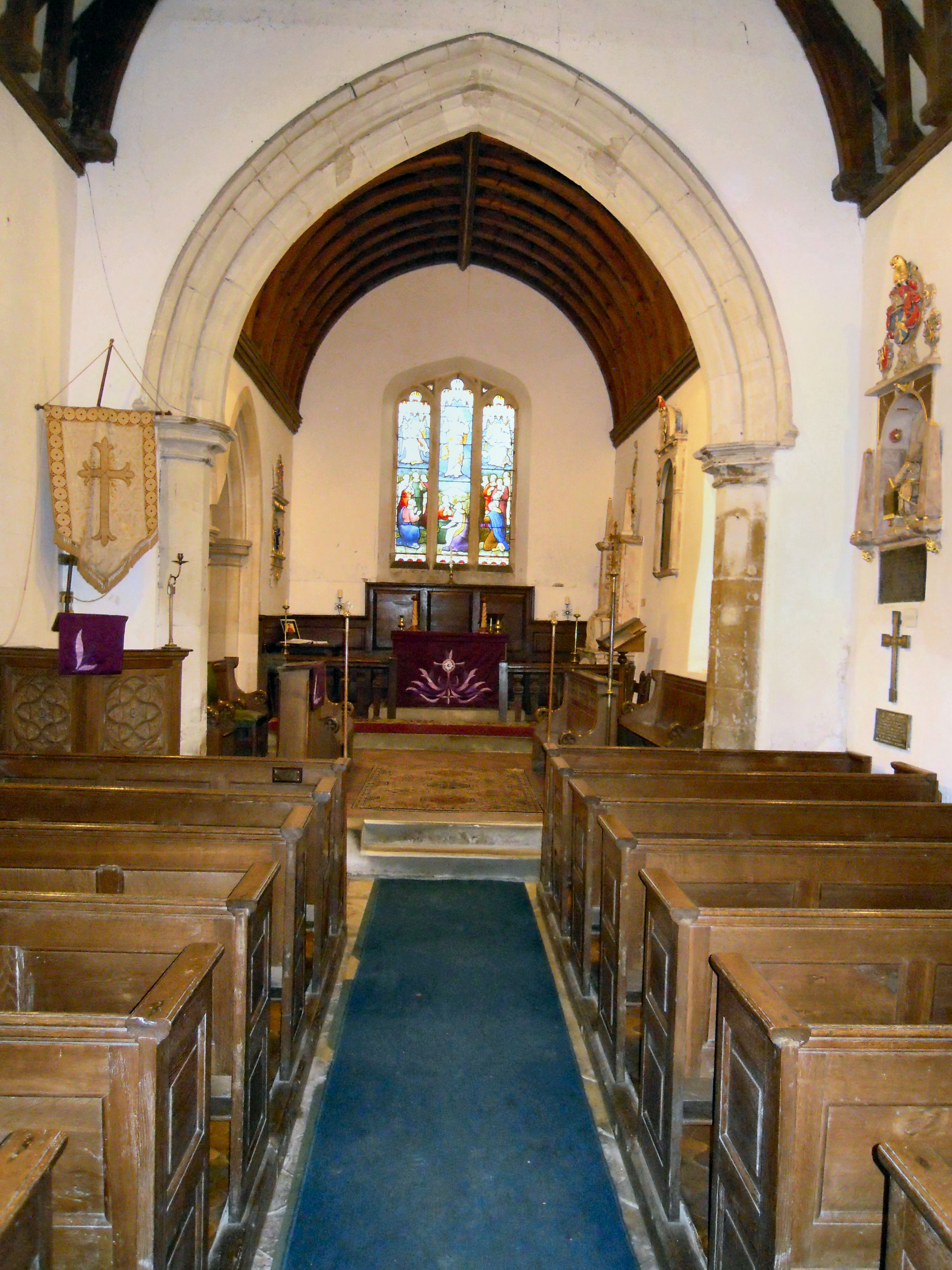
The nave

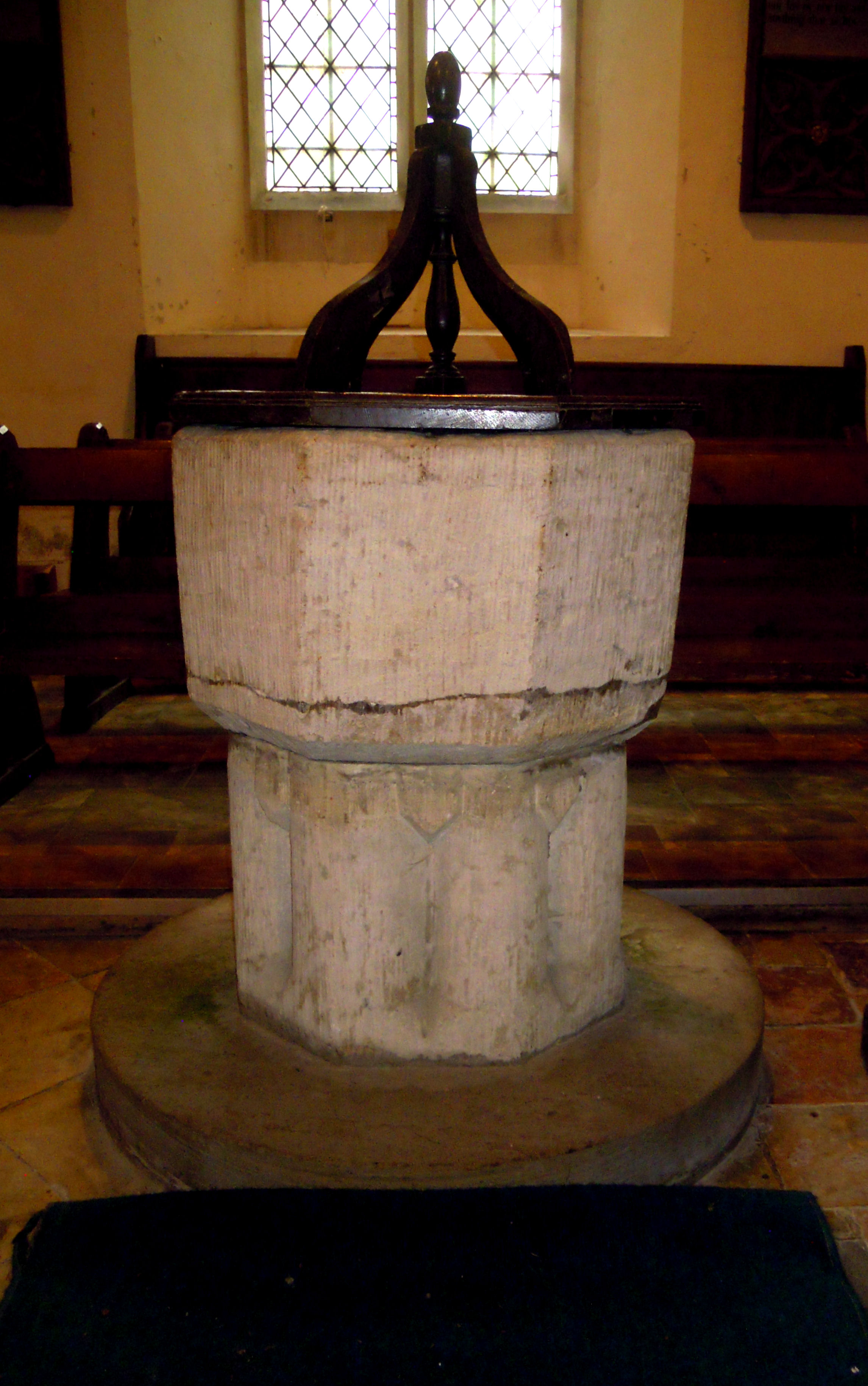
The baptismal font is c.15th century

There was probably a church of some sort on the present site since at least 1215, as the first recorded rector, in 1218, was Baldricus. This first building was probably mainly of wood but nothing of it survives in the present structure.

The present All Saints Church is a small parish church in the Perpendicular style probably dating to the mid-14th century but much restored in the 19th century. The church consists of a chancel 20 ft. by 13 ft. 6 in., a north vestry 14 ft. by 7 ft., the nave 35 ft. by 16 ft. 6 in., and the south porch 8 ft. 6 in. by 8 ft.

Constructed of flint and clunch rubble with the cement render removed in places, the chancel arch, window openings and the walls of the nave and chancel are probably mid-14th century in date, while the east window (a three-light window of about 1500 with decorative late 19th century glass given in 1885) and tower arch date to the early 16th century. The nave was restored in 1875, at which time the pews were added, while the chancel was restored in 1882, when the vestry and south porch were added. The short nave does not have an aisle, and has only one window in each of the north and south walls. The steeply pitched roof has coped gable parapets, while above the west bay of the nave can be seen a bell-cot with a small broached copper spire over the timber bell chamber. A pointed arch separates the west bay, as if the builders had intended to add a tower. The chancel arch dates to about 1340 and is similar in design to the tower arch but is more finely moulded, while the chancel's wagon roof is 19th century. The chancel arch shows traces of a rood screen having been fixed across the archway, but this was presumably destroyed centuries ago.

The large and undecorated baptismal font is 14th or 15th century in date and has shields carved in the recesses on its shaft. The communion rails are 17th century, with square tapering balusters.

The oak pulpit was given as a memorial to Frances Temple Proctor (died 1889), the wife of the rector, the Rev Lovell Proctor, and their son Charles, who drowned in Bombay Harbour in 1906.

== Monuments ==
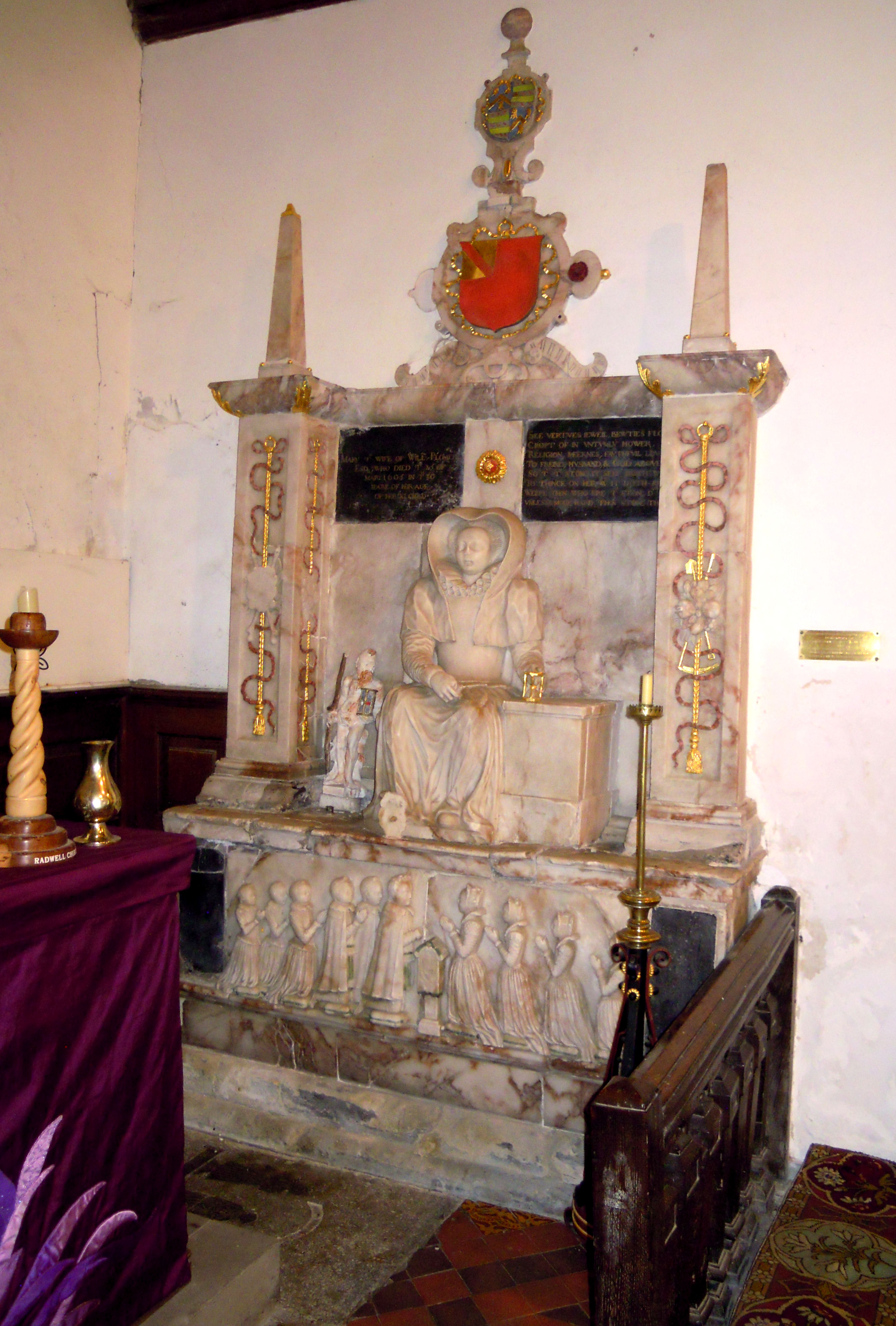
Tomb of Mary Plomer (1605)

On the south wall of the chancel can be found an effigy tomb of Mary Plomer, who died in 1605 at the age of 30 after giving birth to her 11th child. A fine example of rustic Elizabethan sculpture, she is depicted as a large seated frontal figure holding a chrisom child (removed from the effigy for safekeeping) with one foot on a skull and an hour-glass in her hand. The baby is wrapped in a linen chrisom-cloth which at that time was worn for a month after christening in order to protect the sign of the cross made with chrism oil on the baby's head during baptism. This monument suggests that the baby died within a month of baptism. A smaller figure of Time is displayed to the left, with the whole tomb surrounded by decorated piers. On the plinth below is a panel depicting kneeling effigies of her other ten children, showing she had six sons, two of whom are slightly recessed showing they had predeceased her, and her four daughters, with obelisks and achievements above.

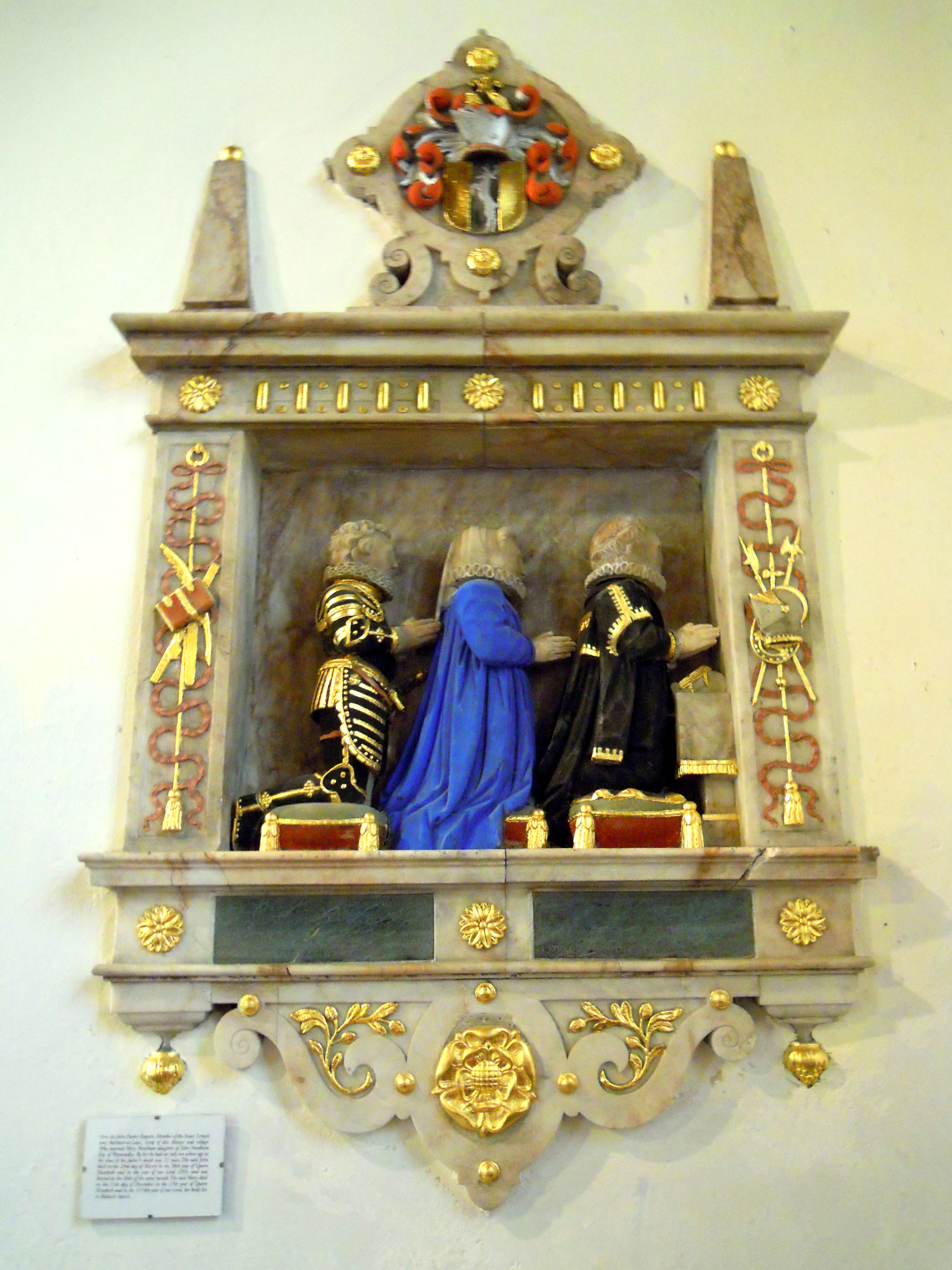
Effigy tomb of John Parker with his wife and son (1595)

On the same wall is a monument to Ann Plomer (d.1625), with an inscribed slab framed by an arch and pediment with achievement above. On the north wall of the chancel is a monument with small kneeling figures of John Parker (d.1595), together with his wife and son in a surround similar to Mary Plomer's tomb but more modest. At the west end of the south chancel wall is a small leather plaque inscribed to William Pym (d.1729). On the south wall of the nave is a monument to William Plomer (d.1625) which displays Plomer kneeling at an altar with flanking obelisks and crests over an arch. Several memorials dating from the 18th century and later are on the nave walls. Several monumental brasses are set in the floor of the chancel, including one in the north dedicated to Elizabeth Parker (d.1602), while in the south is a brass dedicated to William Wheteaker (d.1487), with his wife and son. In the north- east corner of the nave is a brass to John Bele (d.1516) together with his two wives and children and the inscription "Pray for the soules of John Bele gentleman and Anne and Agnes hys wyfes, the whiche John decessed in the year of our Lord God MVXVI". The stone-carved royal arms of George IV above the east face of the tower arch are dated 1825.

In the churchyard is a memorial to Private E.G. Stockham (died 1919) maintained by the Commonwealth War Graves Commission.

== Bells ==
The church has two bells, both quite small. The treble bell is very ancient and was probably cast in the 14th century. The tenor bell is not so old and was probably recast in the 17th century.

== Gallery ==
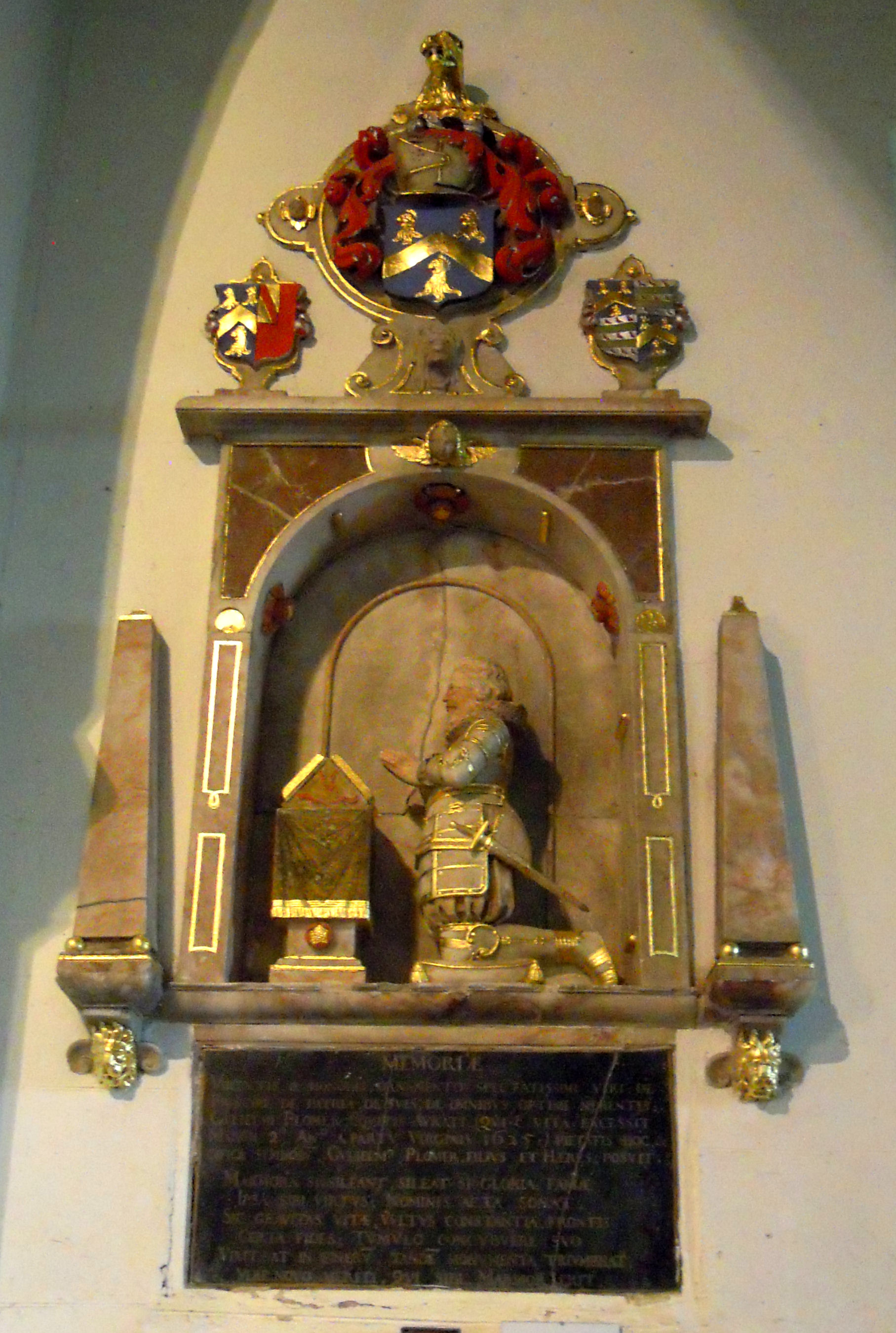
Effigy tomb of William Plomer (1625)

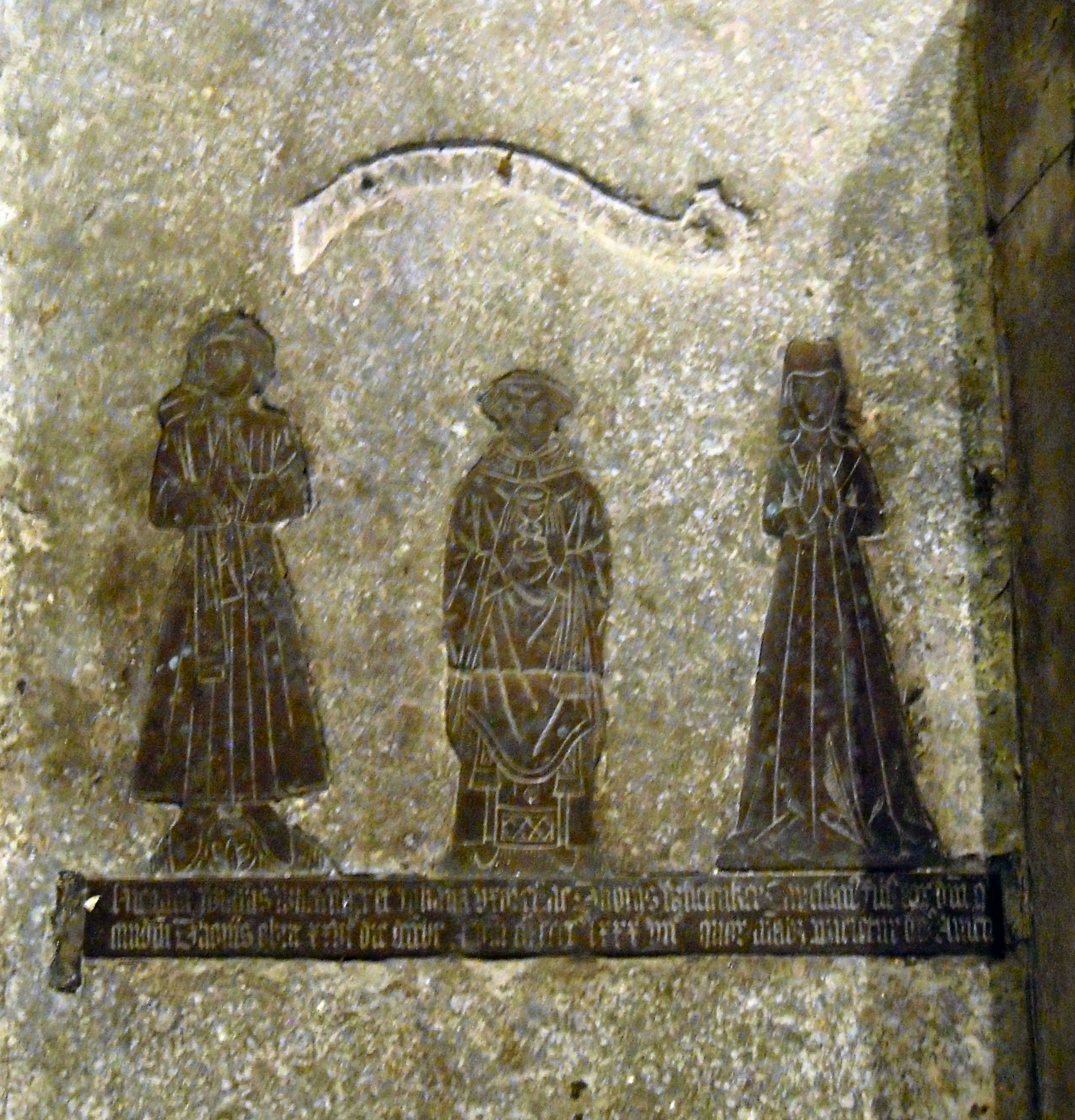
Monumental brass to William Wheteaker with his wife and son (1487)

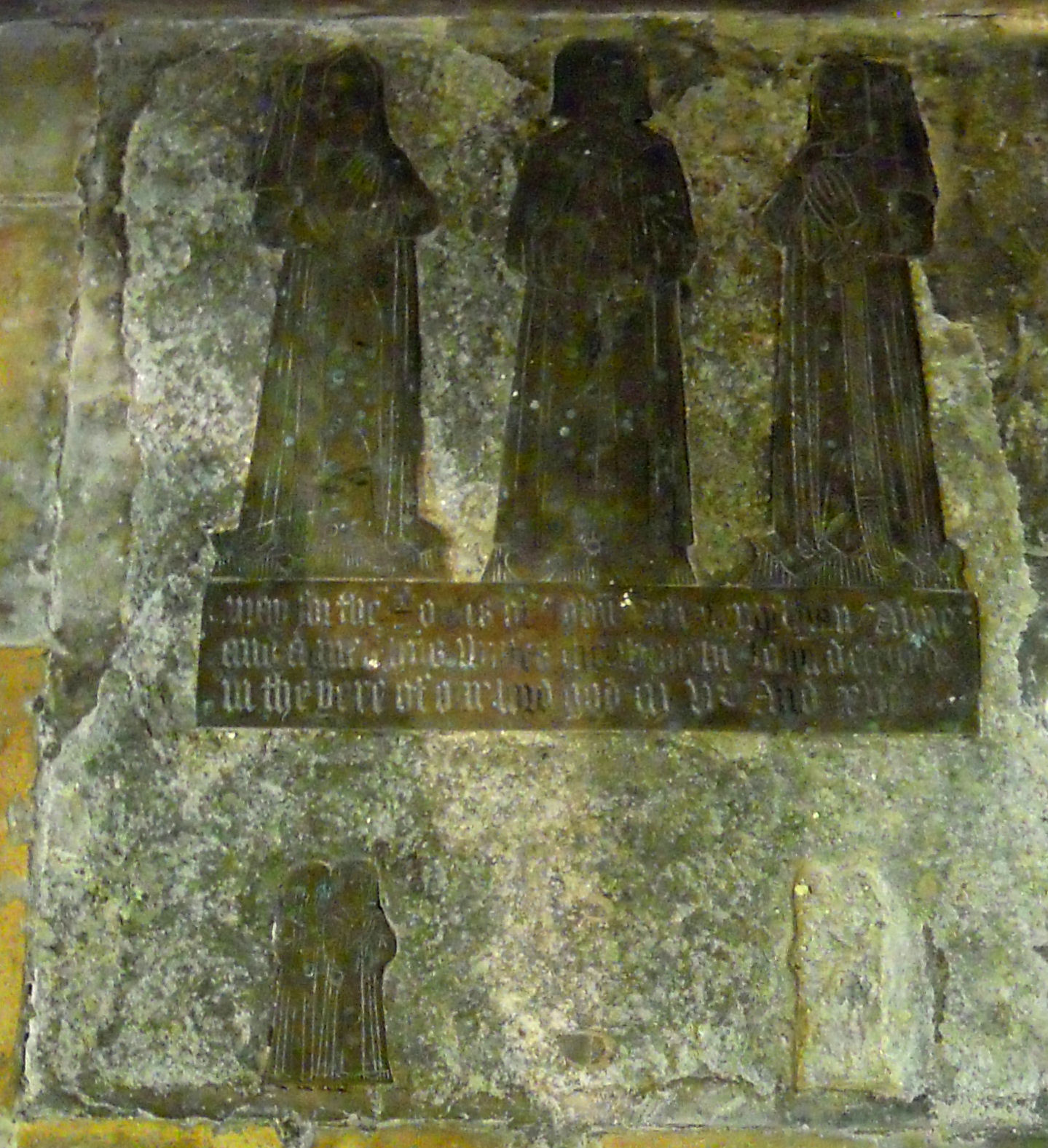
Monumental brass to John Bele with his two wives and children (1516)

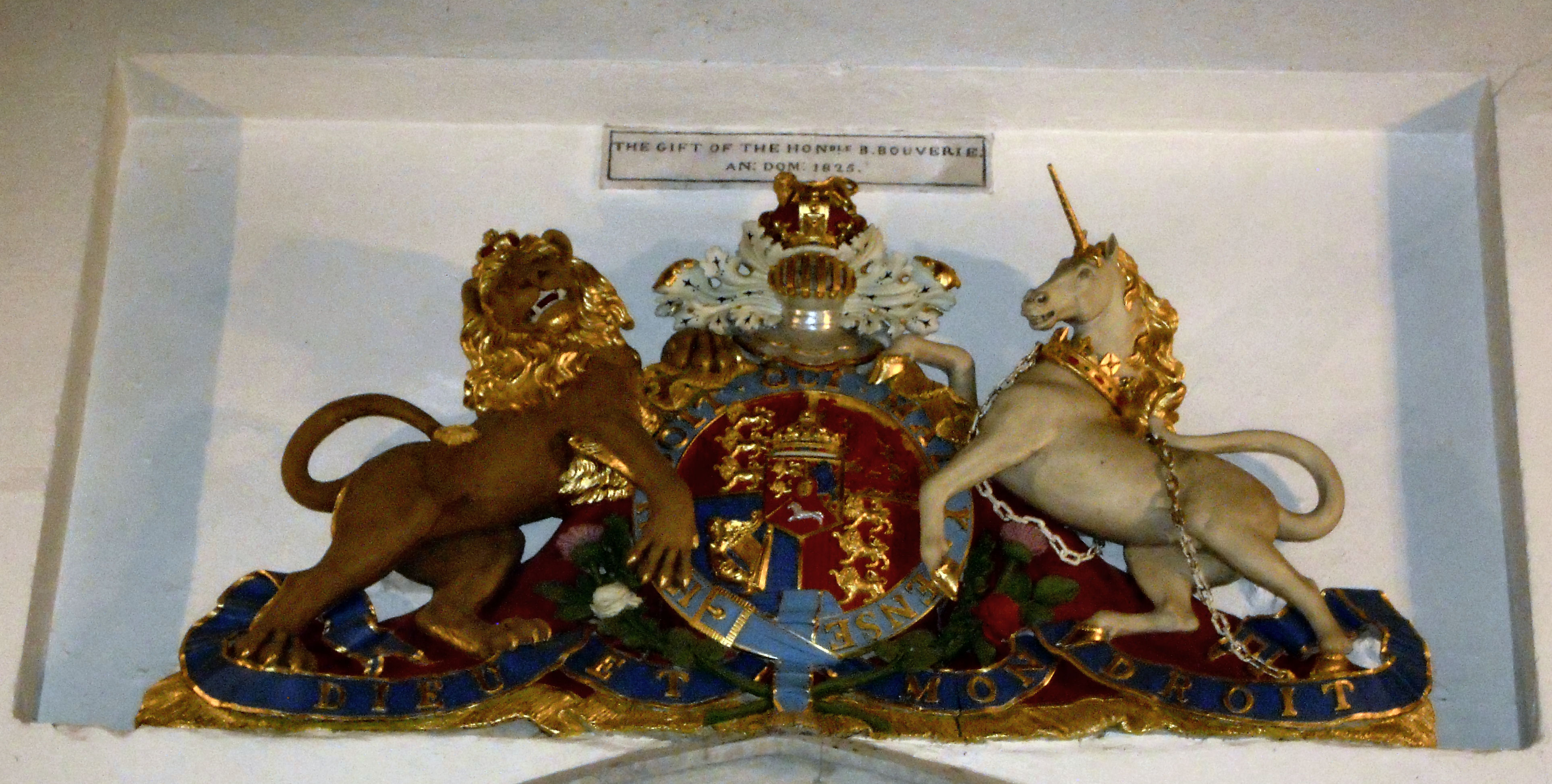
Royal Arms of George IV
