= 2019 North Hertfordshire District Council election =

2019 UK local government election

- 2 May 2019

16 of 49 seats on North Hertfordshire District Council 25 seats needed for a majority
	First party	Second party	Third party
	Con	Lab	LD
Leader	Lynda Needham	Martin Stears-Handscomb	Paul Clark
Party	Conservative	Labour	Liberal Democrats
Seats before	28	14	7
Seats after	22	16	11
Seat change	▼6	▲2	▲4
Popular vote	9,380	5,675	7,384
Percentage	36.0%	21.8%	28.4%
Leader before election
Lynda Needham
Conservative
Leader after election
Martin Stears-Handscomb
Labour
No overall control

The 2019 North Hertfordshire Council election was held on 2 May 2019, at the same time as other local elections across England and Northern Ireland. Of the 49 seats on North Hertfordshire District Council, 16 were up for election.

The Conservatives had a majority on the council prior to the election, but lost a net total of six seats, leaving the council under no overall control. The Conservative leader and leader of the council prior to the election was Lynda Needham, who lost her Letchworth South West seat after a tie with the Liberal Democrat candidate, Sean Prendergast, which was settled by drawing lots. Whilst the Conservatives remained the largest party, with six seats more than any other party, a Labour and Liberal Democrat coalition took control of the council after the election, with the Labour leader, Martin Stears-Handscomb, becoming leader of the council, and the Liberal Democrat leader, Paul Clark, becoming deputy leader of the council. David Levett became new leader of the Conservative group, which became the opposition.

== Overall results ==
Map showing the winner in each ward for the 2019 North Hertfordshire District Council election

The overall results were as follows:

2019 North Hertfordshire District Council election
Party	This election				Full council			This election		
Party	Candidates	Seats	Net	Seats %	Other	Total	Total %	Votes	Votes %	+/−
Conservative	{{{candidates}}}	7	▼6	43.8	15	22	44.9	9,380	36.0	-3.6
Liberal Democrats	{{{candidates}}}	6	▲4	37.5	7	11	22.4	7,384	28.4	+7.8
Labour	{{{candidates}}}	3	▲2	18.8	13	16	32.7	5,675	21.8	-9.2
Green	{{{candidates}}}	0	Steady	0.0	0	0	0.0	2,757	10.6	+3.3
UKIP	{{{candidates}}}	0	Steady	0.0	0	0	0.0	841	3.2	+2.9

== Ward results ==
The results for each ward were as follows. Where the previous incumbent was standing for re-election they are marked with an asterisk (*).

Arbury ward
Party	Candidate	Votes	%	±%
Liberal Democrats	Thomas Wade Tyson (Tom Tyson)	570	51.0%	+39.5
Conservative	Christopher John Schwick (Chris Schwick)	453	40.5%	−23.4
Green	Timothy Peter Lee (Tim Lee)	88	7.9%	−5.0
Turnout		1,118	51.6%	
Liberal Democrats gain from Conservative		Swing	+31.5	

Baldock Town ward
Party	Candidate	Votes	%	±%
Conservative	Michael Douglas Robert Mackenzie Muir*	941	51.4%	+0.7
Liberal Democrats	Robin Christopher Lambie (Rob Lambie)	350	19.1%	+5.9
Labour	Colwyn Luke Griffiths	321	17.5%	−12.7
Green	George Woolhouse	201	11.0%	+5.4
Turnout		1,832	32.0%	
Conservative hold		Swing	-2.6	

Cadwell ward
Party	Candidate	Votes	%	±%
Liberal Democrats	Samuel North (Sam North)	352	48.0%	+38.1
Conservative	Michael Frank Goddard	207	28.2%	−29.8
Labour	David Leon De Smet	95	12.9%	−6.7
Green	Rosamund Brigid McGuire	72	9.8%	−0.8
Turnout		734	41.2%	
Liberal Democrats gain from Conservative		Swing	+33.9	

Chesfield ward
Party	Candidate	Votes	%	±%
Conservative	George Edmund Rhys Davies	595	42.0%	+7.5
Liberal Democrats	Keith Abrahams	337	23.8%	−18.5
Labour	Yusuf Liam Mayet	226	15.9%	−0.9
Green	Mary Karin Marshall	220	15.5%	+9.6
Turnout		1,417	27.4%	
Conservative hold		Swing	+13.0	

Ermine ward
Party	Candidate	Votes	%	±%
Conservative	Gerald Edward Morris*	492	59.2%	−14.5
Liberal Democrats	Suzanne Anderton (Suzie Anderton)	187	22.5%	+22.5
Green	Mark Alister Gamon	104	12.5%	−11.7
Labour	Robin Anthony King	40	4.8%	+4.8
Turnout		831	40.2%	
Conservative hold		Swing	-18.5	

Hitchin Bearton ward
Party	Candidate	Votes	%	±%
Labour	Judi Billing*	1,157	53.7%	−2.6
Liberal Democrats	Jonathan Clayden	351	16.3%	+3.0
Conservative	Gulshan Deep Singh Mangat	328	15.2%	−6.8
Green	Anni Elke Sander	296	13.7%	+5.9
Turnout		2,155	34.4%	
Labour hold		Swing	-2.8	

Hitchin Highbury ward
Party	Candidate	Votes	%	±%
Liberal Democrats	Keith Hoskins	1,606	62.2%	+14.6
Conservative	Leon Emirali	534	20.7%	−9.4
Labour	Angela Jean Griggs	244	9.5%	−7.2
Green	Diana Joyce Newson	181	7.0%	+1.4
Turnout		2,582	41.9%	
Liberal Democrats gain from Conservative		Swing	+12.0	

Hitchin Walsworth ward
Party	Candidate	Votes	%	±%
Labour	Kay Frances Tart	994	44.4%	−3.7
Conservative	Mark David Russell	570	25.4%	−4.5
Green	William Lavin	393	17.5%	+5.8
Liberal Democrats	Ying Han	255	11.4%	+1.5
Turnout		2,240	37.1%	
Labour gain from Conservative		Swing	+0.4	

Hitchwood, Offa and Hoo ward
Party	Candidate	Votes	%	±%
Conservative	David John Barnard*	1,149	54.7%	−8.3
Green	Nicola Jane Clark (Nicky Clark)	360	17.1%	+7.3
Liberal Democrats	Marilyn Margaret Parkin	305	14.5%	+5.6
Labour	Anton Jungreuthmayer	260	12.4%	−5.8
Turnout		2,100	36.1%	
Conservative hold		Swing	-7.8	

Letchworth Grange ward
Party	Candidate	Votes	%	±%
Conservative	Morgan William Derbyshire	708	37.9%	+0.1
Labour	Conor Brogan	563	30.1%	−13.3
UKIP	Steven Adelantado	234	12.5%	+12.5
Liberal Democrats	Joshua Edward Hamilton (Josh Hamilton)	187	10.0%	−1.4
Green	Sarah Elizabeth Cope	172	9.2%	+1.3
Turnout		1,868	34.4%	
Conservative gain from Liberal Democrats		Swing	+6.7	

The retiring councillor in Letchworth Grange ward, Paul Marment, had been elected as a Conservative in 2015, but defected to the Liberal Democrats in 2018.

Letchworth South East ward
Party	Candidate	Votes	%	±%
Labour	Adem Irfan Ruggiero-Cakir	796	43.3%	+4.3
Conservative	Andrew Malcolm Clare	783	42.6%	+4.0
UKIP	Sidney Arthur Start	242	13.2%	+7.6
Turnout		1,838	34.0%	
Labour gain from Conservative		Swing	+0.1	

Letchworth South West ward
Party	Candidate	Votes	%	±%
Liberal Democrats	Sean Prendergast	800	34.6%	+7.8
Conservative	Lynda Ann Needham*	800	34.6%	−9.0
Labour	Jean Andrews	279	12.1%	−9.5
UKIP	Wendy Gross	218	9.4%	+9.4
Green	Nicholas Mark Newson	201	8.7%	+1.1
Turnout		2,312	38.9%	
Liberal Democrats gain from Conservative		Swing	+8.4	

As the result in Letchworth South West ward was a draw, the tied candidates drew lots to choose the winner.

Royston Heath ward
Party	Candidate	Votes	%	±%
Liberal Democrats	Carol Ann Stanier	963	54.2%	+9.4
Conservative	Sarah Anne Dingley*	538	30.3%	−10.4
Green	Katherine Marie Shann	134	7.5%	+3.7
Labour	Amy Jane Bourke-Waite	119	6.7%	−3.6
Turnout		1,777	40.3%	
Liberal Democrats gain from Conservative		Swing	+9.9	

Royston Meridian ward
Party	Candidate	Votes	%	±%
Conservative	Anthony Frederick Hunter* (Tony Hunter)	699	47.3%	−7.8
Liberal Democrats	Peter Martin Rice	340	23.0%	+13.6
UKIP	Christopher Laurence Arquati	147	9.9%	+9.9
Labour	Stephen James Lockett	147	9.9%	−7.2
Green	Karen Julie Harmel	140	9.5%	−8.2
Turnout		1,479	35.9%	
Conservative hold		Swing	-10.7	

Royston Palace ward
Party	Candidate	Votes	%	±%
Conservative	Jean Margaret Green*	474	37.8%	−5.5
Labour	Robert Edward Inwood (Rob Inwood)	415	33.1%	−0.5
Liberal Democrats	Amy Chesterton Di Capite	180	14.4%	−1.5
Green	Angela Clark	170	13.6%	+6.5
Turnout		1,253	28.6%	
Conservative hold		Swing	-2.5	

Weston and Sandon ward
Party	Candidate	Votes	%	±%
Liberal Democrats	Stephen Kenneth Jarvis* (Steve Jarvis)	601	79.1%	+21.6
Conservative	Michael Steven Frederick Storm Hearn	109	14.3%	−18.3
Green	Desmond Peter Stephens (Des Stephens)	25	3.3%	−6.2
Labour	Headley Valentine Parkins	19	2.5%	2.5
Turnout		760	46.2%	
Liberal Democrats hold		Swing	+20.0	

== Changes 2019–2021 ==
Two councillors resigned in March 2020: Ben Lewis, Conservative councillor for Royston Palace, and Deepak Sangha, Labour councillor for Letchworth Wilbury. Due to the COVID-19 pandemic no by-election could be held. The vacancies were subsequently filled at the 2021 election, which would have been when Deepak Sangha's term of office would have expired anyway.
