= Chris Hinchliff =

British Labour politician

Christopher Hinchliff MP
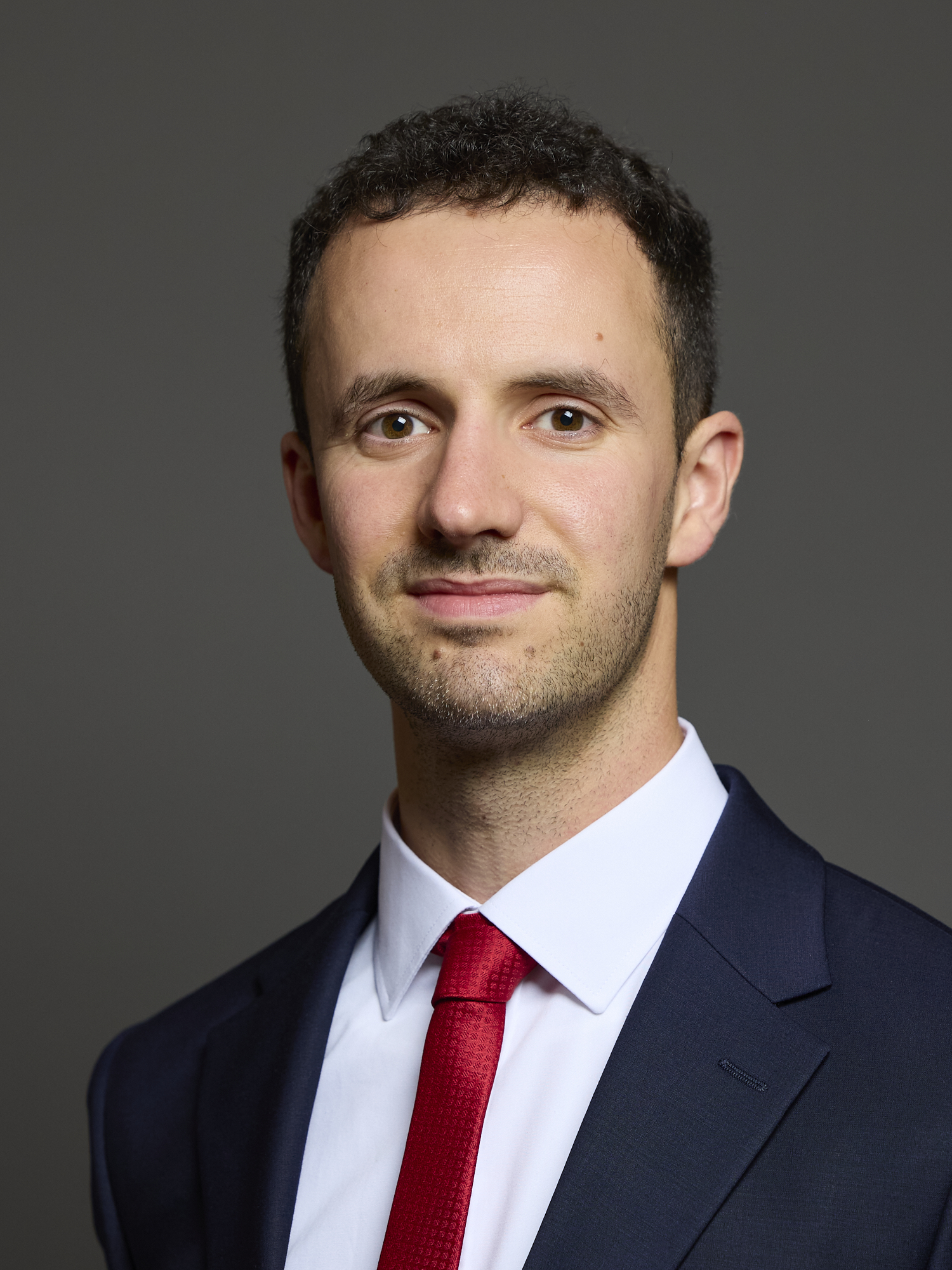
- Official portrait, 2024

Member of Parliament for North East Hertfordshire
- Incumbent
- Assumed office 4 July 2024
- Preceded by: Oliver Heald
- Majority: 1,923 (3.7%)

North Hertfordshire District Councillor for Royston Palace
- In office 5 May 2022 – 2 September 2024
- Preceded by: Sarah Dingley
- Succeeded by: Sarah Lucas

Personal details
- Born: Christopher Volante Hinchliff; December 1993 (age 32)
- Party: Labour
- Other political affiliations: Labour Co-op (as a councillor)
- Relatives: Peter Hinchliff (grandfather)
- Education: Howard of Effingham School
- Alma mater: King's College, Cambridge (BA); University of Edinburgh (MSc)
- Website: www.chrishinchliff.co.uk

Christopher Volante Hinchliff (born December 1993) is a British Labour Party politician who has been Member of Parliament (MP) for North East Hertfordshire since 2024. He was previously a North Hertfordshire District Councillor for Royston Palace.

== Early life and education ==
Christopher Volante Hinchliff was born in December 1993. He was educated at The Howard of Effingham School in Surrey and King's College, Cambridge, where he read history and was a member of Cambridge University Labour Club. In 2016, he graduated with an MSc in ecological economics from the University of Edinburgh. Prior to his election to Parliament, Hinchliff was the policy and campaigns officer for the Campaign to Protect Rural England.

== Political career ==
Hinchliff joined the Labour Party as a young adult and assisted in Daniel Zeichner's successful campaign for Cambridge in the 2015 general election. He then led the Thurrock Labour campaign in the 2018 local elections. In 2022, he was elected as a Labour and Co-operative Party councillor for the Royston Palace ward of North Hertfordshire District Council. On the council, he served on the Employment Appeals and Royston & District committees, as well as the Cabinet Panel on the Environment. He was re-elected in 2024 and appointed Cabinet Executive Member for Planning and Transport.

Hinchliff was selected as the Labour candidate for North East Hertfordshire in May 2024. He won the constituency from the Conservatives in the 2024 general election with a majority of 1,923 votes. Hinchliff resigned as a councillor on 2 September 2024 following his election to Parliament. In October 2024, he was elected to the Environmental Audit Select Committee.

On 16 July 2025, Hinchliff was suspended from the Labour Party and had the whip withdrawn following persistent breaches of party discipline, including rebelling against proposed welfare cuts and publicly criticising the party's planning reforms. On 7 November 2025, the whip was restored.

== Political positions ==
=== Welfare ===
In September 2024, Hinchliff signed Neil Duncan-Jordan's early day motion calling on the government to postpone ending the Winter Fuel Payment for pensioners without means-tested benefits such as Pension Credit. However, in the vote on the topic that same month, he voted to implement the restrictions. Following the March 2025 spring statement, Hinchliff opposed the cuts to several benefits including Universal Credit as well as changes to the eligibility criteria for the Personal Independence Payment (PIP), labelling them "crude measure[s] designed to meet self-imposed fiscal rules". He stated that he believed in "a welfare state that supports everyone in times of need, protects the most vulnerable, and upholds equality and dignity for all".

=== Planning regulation and the environment ===
In April 2025, Hinchliff proposed a series of amendments to the government's Planning and Infrastructure Bill, stating that the government's approach had "a narrow focus on increasing housing supply, when we already have substantially more homes per capita than we did 50 years ago" and that the government's consultation with HSBC, BlackRock and the Phoenix Group on housing policy was a "problem" because "private finance will always prioritise profits over meeting housing needs". He also stated that there needed to be a "progressive alternative" to the plans, focused on building more affordable and council houses. Hinchliff received criticism for his position, with opponents branding him a "NIMBY" and arguing that he was attempting to block new housing.

Hinchliff has also opposed the expansion of London Luton Airport.

== Electoral performance ==
=== House of Commons ===
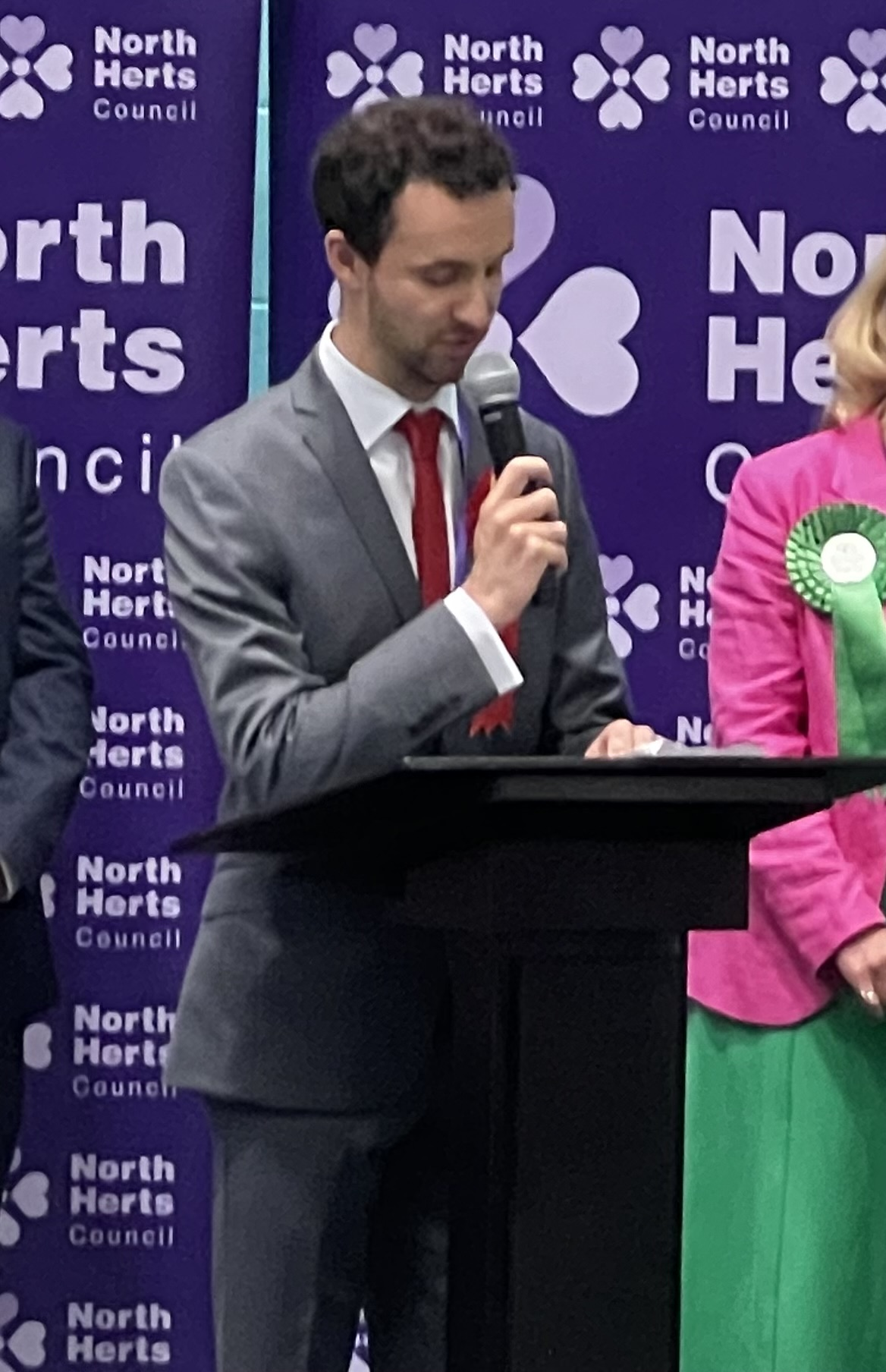
Hinchliff at the declaration for his seat at the 2024 election

General election 2024: North East Hertfordshire
Party	Candidate	Votes	%	±%
Labour	Chris Hinchliff	18,358	35.0	+11.3
Conservative	Nikki da Costa	16,435	31.3	−25.3
Reform	Steven Adelantado	8,462	16.1	New
Liberal Democrats	Ruth Brown	5,463	10.4	−5.1
Green	Vicky Burt	3,802	7.2	+2.9
Majority		1,923	3.7	
Turnout		52,520	67.6	−5.1
Labour gain from Conservative		Swing	+18.3	

=== North Hertfordshire District Council ===
2024 North Hertfordshire District Council election: Royston Palace (2 seats)
Party	Candidate	Votes	%	±%
Labour Co-op	Catherine Brownjohn	581	40.3	
Labour Co-op	Chris Hinchliff	546	37.9	
Conservative	Jean Green	376	26.1	
Liberal Democrats	Emma Squire-Smith	362	25.1	
Conservative	Paul Fletcher	337	23.4	
Liberal Democrats	Gill Lewis	334	23.2	
Independent	Lisa Adams	195	13.5	
Turnout		1,466	34.7	
Labour Co-op hold				
Labour Co-op hold				

2022 North Hertfordshire District Council election: Royston Palace
Party	Candidate	Votes	%	±%
Labour Co-op	Chris Hinchliff	590	40.7	+7.6
Conservative	Sarah Dingley	563	38.8	+1.0
Liberal Democrats	Bryony May	297	20.5	+6.1
Majority		27	1.9	
Turnout		1,468	33.6	
Labour Co-op gain from Conservative		Swing	+3.3	

Parliament of the United Kingdom
Preceded by Oliver Heald	Member of Parliament for North East Hertfordshire; 2024–present	Incumbent
Political offices
Preceded by Sarah Dingley	North Hertfordshire District Councillor for Royston Palace; 2022–2024	Succeeded by Sarah Lucas
