= Radwell, Hertfordshire =

Village in Hertfordshire, England

Coordinates: 52.007°N 0.206°W

Radwell
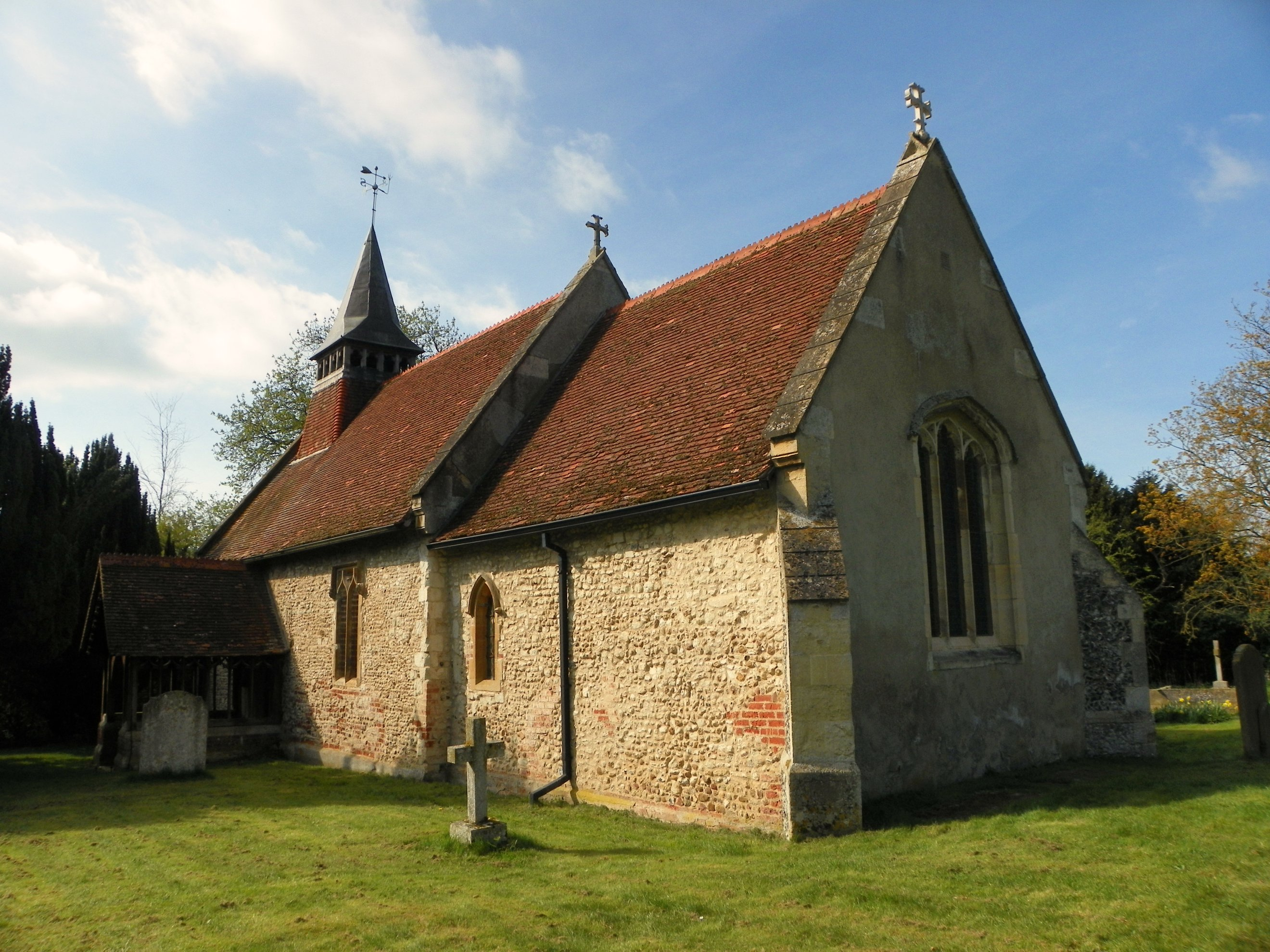
- All Saints' Church, Radwell

- Location within Hertfordshire
- Population: 133 (Parish, 2021)
- OS grid reference: TL 23284 35835
- Civil parish: Radwell
- District: North Hertfordshire
- Shire county: Hertfordshire
- Region: East
- Country: England
- Sovereign state: United Kingdom
- Post town: BALDOCK
- Postcode district: SG7
- Dialling code: 01462
- Police: Hertfordshire
- Fire: Hertfordshire
- Ambulance: East of England
- UK Parliament: North East Hertfordshire

Radwell is a village and civil parish in Hertfordshire, England. It is situated on the River Ivel and on the A1 a little to the north of Baldock and Letchworth Garden City and is in the district of North Hertfordshire. A site of the buried remains of a Roman Villa, which is a scheduled monument, lies north of the River Ivel.

The small 14th-century Church of All Saints is in the centre of the village.

== Geography ==
Radwell is on the River Ivel, and it is located on the A1 slightly north of Baldock and Letchworth Garden City.

A borehole off of Baldock Road, at Radwell, there was:

Geological data off Baldock Road
Grey Sand	Chalk and Gault clay
27 metres (89 ft)	95 metres (312 ft)

== History ==
A scheduled monument includes the buried remains of a Roman villa north of the River Ivel, 200 m (660 ft) south of Bury Farm. The course of the river defines the south western extent of level ground containing the remains of two ranges, beyond which the land rises by about 1.5 m (4 ft 11 in). From this point, the field slopes towards the line of the A1(M) is to the north east. Aerial photography have provided a picture of the villa structures, the parts of the settlement, and a series of additional features, with remains of a medieval field system, the buried remains of a bank and ditch dated from the Iron Age. A square system of ditches encloses the villa on three sides, the south western boundary being the River Ivel . The area enclosed is 200 m (660 ft) long by 180 m (590 ft) wide. These ditches continue beyond the main enclosure, with further land divisions, but their full extent is unclear. A sample of these features is included in the scheduling. The main villa building lies approximately 400 m (1,300 ft) south of the farmhouse. It is visible in the aerial record as a rectangular structure 40 m (130 ft) in length and 20 m (66 ft) wide, north east to south west and situated in the western corner of a ditched yard. The walls are light parched areas in the crop, indicating the survival of stone foundations. The core of the building (the earliest part of the structure) is an oblong hall subdivided into one large square room and four smaller chambers by four walls spanning the width. This central range is flanked by narrow corridors extending around the south western and north eastern ends and showing traces of subdivisions. A further room is attached to the southern end of the south eastern corridor, forming a very slight wing, and this have been matched at the northern end. Two small annexes extend from the north western corridor on the opposite side. Cropmark evidence indicates two oblong structures approximately 30 m (98 ft) long by 12 m (39 ft) wide lying parallel to each other and at right angles to and about 70 m (230 ft) and 110 m (360 ft) north east of the main villa building, one in the courtyard and another in an adjoining sub-enclosure. It was that these were of aisled construction, with internal partitions, and would have been used as barns, stables or workshops.

A marble head (sculpted) was found in the site of the Radwell villa.

Radwell was recorded in the Domesday Book and had a population of 23 households in 1086 which was in the largest 40% of settlements recorded in Domesday.

It is listed under two owners:

Land of Peter of Valognes	Land of Bishop Odo of Bayeux
Households - 5 smallholders and 2 slaves	Households - 8 villagers, 4 smallholders and 4 slaves.
Land and resources - 3 ploughlands. 2 lord's plough teams. 0.5 men's plough teams.	Land and resources - 7 ploughlands, 2 lord’s plough teams and 3 men’s plough teams

== Governance ==
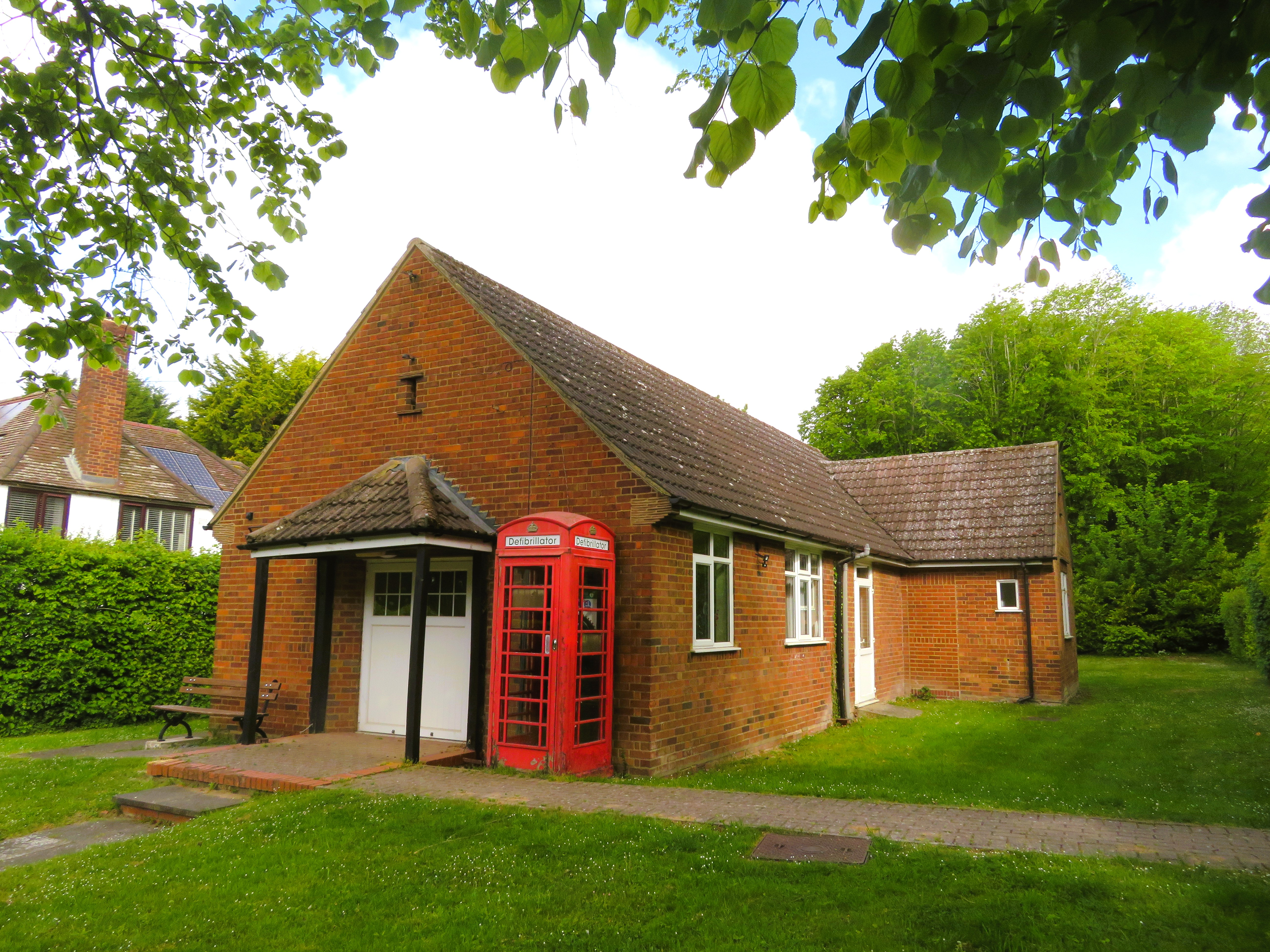
Radwell Village Hall

There are two elected tiers of local government covering Radwell, at district and county level: North Hertfordshire District Council and Hertfordshire County Council. Due to its low population, Radwell has a parish meeting comprising all residents instead of an elected parish council.

== Notable people ==
- Nigel Hawthorne, lived in Radwell.

== Landmarks ==
=== Radwell Mill ===
Also known as Craddocks Mill, it is probable that it contains medieval origin as the, 'molendin. de Radewellesheved' (the mill of Radwell) is documented in the 14th century. It is situated on the River Ivel.

Radwell Mill and the adjoining Mill Pond
