= North Hertfordshire =

UK local government district

Coordinates: 52.0°N 0.2°W

North Hertfordshire District
- Non-metropolitan district
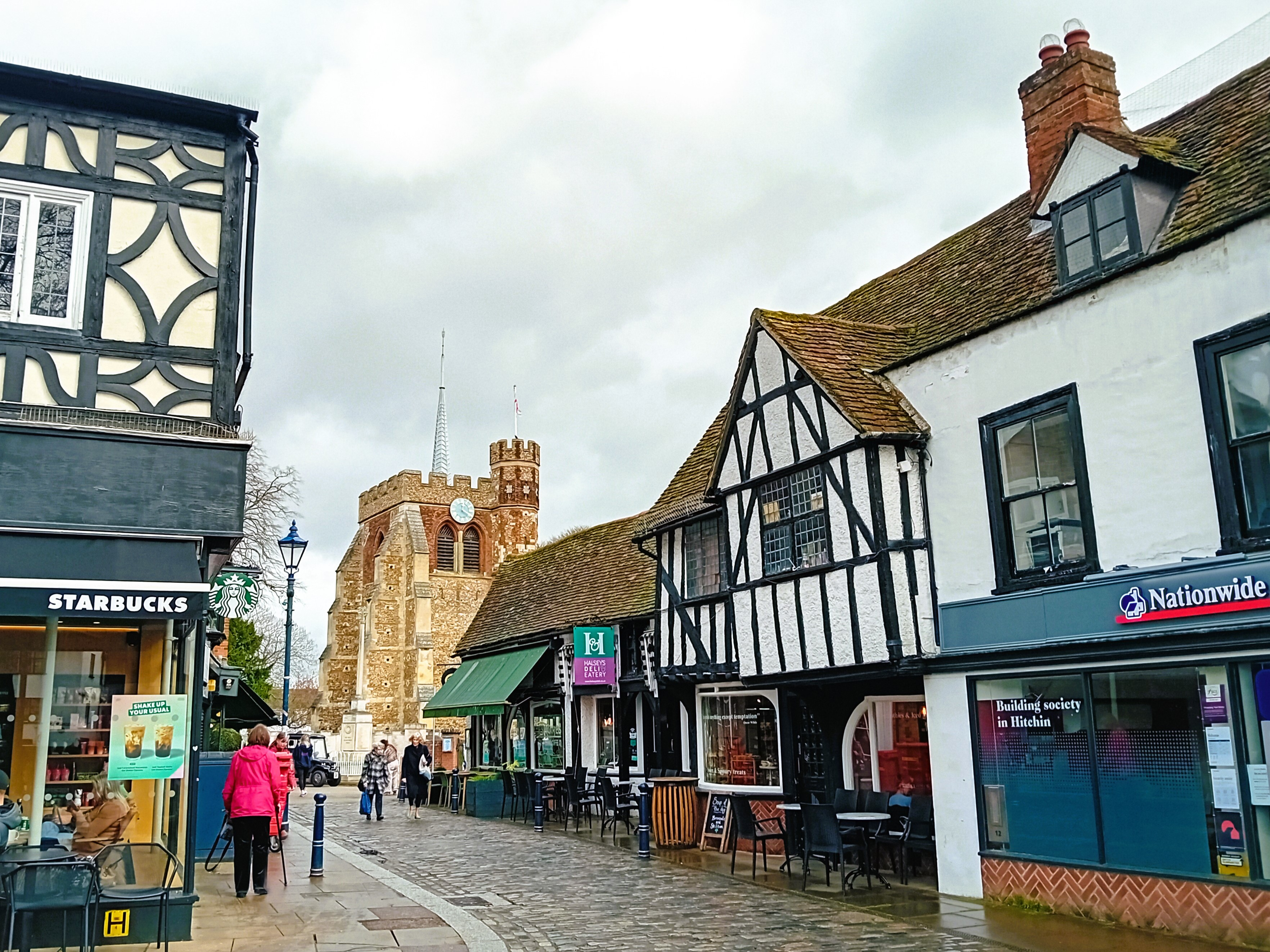
- St Mary's Church from Market Place in Hitchin, the district's largest town

- Coat of arms

- North Hertfordshire shown within Hertfordshire
- Sovereign state: United Kingdom
- Constituent country: England
- Region: East of England
- Non-metropolitan county: Hertfordshire
- Status: Non-metropolitan district
- Admin HQ: Letchworth
- Established: 1 April 1974

Government
  - Type: Non-metropolitan district council
  - Body: North Hertfordshire District Council
  - MPs: Kevin Bonavia (L); Chris Hinchliff (L); Alistair Strathern (L)

Area
  - Total: 144.9 sq mi (375.4 km^{2})
  - Rank: 91st (of 296)

Population (2024)
  - Total: 137,201
  - Rank: 179th (of 296)
  - Density: 946.6/sq mi (365.5/km^{2})

Ethnicity (2021)
  - Ethnic groups: List: 87.5% White; 5.2% Asian; 3.7% Mixed; 2.4% Black; 1.1% other

Religion (2021)
  - Religion: List: 44.5% no religion; 43.8% Christianity; 10.2% other; 1.5% Islam
- Time zone: UTC0 (GMT)
  - Summer (DST): UTC+1 (BST)
- ONS code: 26UF (ONS); E07000099 (GSS)
- OS grid reference: TL2355435083

North Hertfordshire is one of ten local government districts in the county of Hertfordshire, England. Its council is based in Letchworth Garden City and the largest town is Hitchin. The district also includes the towns of Baldock and Royston and numerous villages and surrounding rural areas. Part of the district lies within the Chiltern Hills, a designated Area of Outstanding Natural Beauty.

The neighbouring districts are East Hertfordshire, Stevenage, Welwyn Hatfield, St Albans, Luton, Central Bedfordshire, South Cambridgeshire and Uttlesford.

== History ==
North Hertfordshire was created on 1 April 1974 under the Local Government Act 1972, covering the area of five former districts, which were all abolished at the same time:

- Baldock Urban District
- Hitchin Urban District
- Hitchin Rural District
- Letchworth Urban District
- Royston Urban District

The new district was named North Hertfordshire, reflecting its position within the wider county.

Under current local government reorganisation plans, all district councils in Hertfordshire, as well as the county council, will be abolished in 2028, with the district becoming part of a new Central Hertfordshire unitary authority.

== Governance ==
North Hertfordshire District Council

Type
- Type: Non-metropolitan district council

Leadership
- Chair: Keith Hoskins, Liberal Democrat since 22 May 2025
- Leader: Val Bryant, Labour since 13 January 2026
- Chief Executive: Anthony Roche since 18 July 2020

Structure
- Seats: 51 councillors
- Political groups: Administration (23) Labour (23) Other parties (28) Liberal Democrats (20) Conservatives (7) Independent (1)

Elections
- Last election: 2 May 2024
- Next election: 4 May 2028

Meeting place
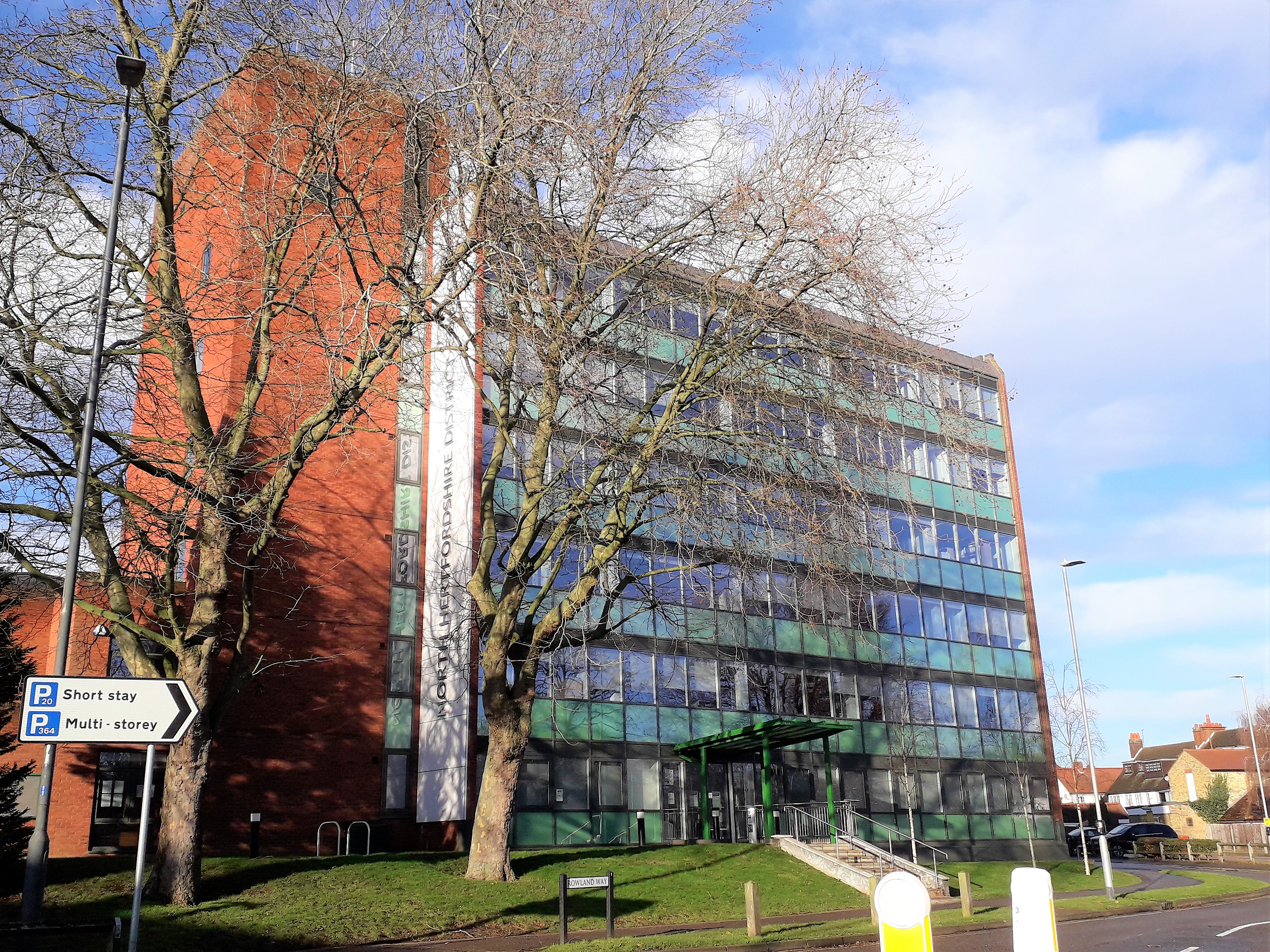
- Council Offices, Gernon Road, Letchworth Garden City, SG6 3JF

Website
- www.north-herts.gov.uk

North Hertfordshire District Council provides district-level services. County-level services are provided by Hertfordshire County Council. Much of the district is covered by civil parishes, which form a third tier of local government for their areas.

=== Political control ===
The council has been under no overall control since the 2019 election. Following the 2024 election the council is being run by a Labour minority administration.

The first election to North Hertfordshire District Council was held in 1973, initially operating as a shadow authority alongside the outgoing authorities until the new system came into force on 1 April 1974. Political control since 1974 has been as follows:

Party in control	Years
No overall control	1974–1976
Conservative	1976–1994
No overall control	1994–1996
Labour	1996–1999
Conservative	1999–2019
No overall control	2019–present

=== Leadership ===
The leaders of the council since 1974 have been:

Councillor	Party	From	To
Bob Flatman	Conservative	1 Apr 1974	May 1992
Geoff Woods	Conservative	19 May 1992	May 1995
David Kearns	Labour	May 1995	May 1999
F. John Smith	Conservative	May 1999	May 2010
Lynda Needham	Conservative	20 May 2010	May 2019
Martin Stears-Handscomb	Labour	21 May 2019	May 2021
Elizabeth Dennis	Labour	26 May 2021	May 2024
Daniel Allen	Labour	23 May 2024	4 Dec 2025
Val Bryant	Labour	13 Jan 2026	

=== Composition ===
Following the 2024 election and subsequent changes of allegiance up to May 2025, the composition of the council was:

Party	Councillors
Labour	23
Liberal Democrats	20
Conservative	7
Independent	1
Total	51

The next election is due in 2028.

=== Elections ===
Since the last boundary changes in 2024, the council has comprised 51 councillors representing 25 wards, with each ward elected one, two or three councillors. Elections are held every four years.

=== Premises ===
When the council was created in 1974, it inherited five sets of offices from the five former authorities, spread across the four towns of Hitchin, Letchworth, Baldock and Royston. Initially the new council used the former Hitchin Rural District Council's offices (later called Centenary House) on Grammar School Walk in Hitchin as its headquarters, with the other offices providing additional accommodation. In 1975, the year after the new council's creation, it consolidated most of its functions into a new six-storey building called Council Offices on Gernon Road in Letchworth, designed by Tony Walker of architects Damond Lock, Grabowski and Partners. The building was formally opened on 22 July 1975 by Prince Richard, Duke of Gloucester. The council rented the building until 2013, when it purchased it for £3.6 million.

== Towns and parishes ==
North Hertfordshire contains four towns, being Baldock, Hitchin, Letchworth, and Royston. The district also borders the northern, western and southern edges of Stevenage, and some parts of the latter's urban area lie within North Hertfordshire rather than the borough of Stevenage, notably including much of the Great Ashby area. Knebworth is a post town, but its parish council has not formally declared it a town.

North Hertfordshire contains 35 civil parishes. Six of the smaller parishes do not have parish councils, having instead a parish meeting, being those marked with asterisks(*) below. In addition, the three towns of Baldock, Hitchin, and Letchworth are unparished areas, as no successor parishes were created for those three former urban districts on their abolition in 1974. A Letchworth Garden City Parish was subsequently created in 2005, but was abolished in 2013.

- Ashwell
- Barley
- Barkway
- Bygrave
- Caldecote (Note: Shares grouped parish council with Newnham)
- Clothall*
- Codicote
- Graveley
- Great Ashby (Note: Council styled "Community Council")
- Hexton*
- Hinxworth
- Holwell
- Ickleford
- Kelshall*
- Kimpton
- Kings Walden
- Knebworth
- Langley*
- Lilley
- Newnham (Note: Shares grouped parish council with Caldecote)
- Nuthampstead*
- Offley
- Pirton
- Preston
- Radwell*
- Reed
- Royston (Note: Council styled "Town Council")
- Rushden (Note: Shares grouped parish council with Wallington)
- Sandon
- St Ippolyts
- St Paul's Walden
- Therfield
- Wallington (Note: Shares grouped parish council with Rushden)
- Weston
- Wymondley

== Arms ==
Coat of arms of North Hertfordshire

Notes
Granted 16 January 1975
Crest
On a wreath of the colours two sprigs of oak in saltire fructed Proper enfiling a mural crown Or perched thereon a hooded crow (Corvus cornix cornix) close Proper.
Escutcheon
Chevronny of six Or and Gules a pale Ermine on a chief Vert a fleece between two garbs of barley Or.
Supporters
On either side a hart attired of ten tynes Proper gorged with a coronet pendent therefrom a pentagon Or charged with a cogwheel Sable
Motto
Memores Acte Prudentes Futuri

== Logo ==
Former logo used c. 1990–2021.

In 2021 the council adopted a new logo of four hearts (shown in the infobox above) and the style "North Herts Council" instead of its full formal name of "North Hertfordshire District Council". Prior to this, the council had used a logo of the initials "NHDC" in a green and purple square for approximately thirty years.

== Media ==
In terms of television, North Hertfordshire is served by BBC East and ITV Anglia with television signals received from the Sandy Heath TV transmitter.

Radio stations that broadcast to the area are:

- BBC Three Counties Radio
- BBC Radio Cambridgeshire (covering Royston)
- Heart Hertfordshire

Local newspapers for the area are:

- The Comet
- Hertfordshire Mercury
- Royston Crow
