= Independent conservative =

Political conservative who lacks a formal affiliation to the party of that name

Independent Conservative is a description which has been used in the United Kingdom, Canada, United States and elsewhere, to denote a political conservative who lacks a formal affiliation to the party of that name.

== In the United Kingdom ==
As a description for use on the ballot paper, until 1999 anyone could stand at any British election as an Independent Conservative, but since the Registration of Political Parties Act 1998 came into force, a candidate who is not officially certified by the Conservative Party must either stand for another registered political party or as an independent. However, the term is still used to designate a politician who either has left the Conservative Party or never joined it, so is independent of it, but who nevertheless identifies as a conservative.

Lord Robert Cecil was an Independent Conservative in the House of Commons between 1911 and 1923, after he won the 1911 by-election for Hitchin, Hertfordshire. At the 1945 general election, John Mackie and Daniel Lipson were both elected to the Commons as Independent Conservatives.

Andrew Hunter was elected as a Conservative MP in 2001; he left the party when selected in 2002 as a candidate for the Democratic Unionist Party in the 2003 Northern Ireland Assembly election. Hunter sat as an Independent Conservative MP until joining the DUP Westminster parliamentary party in 2004.

Lord Stevens of Ludgate sat in the House of Lords as an Independent Conservative between 2004 and 2012. Derek Conway sat as an Independent Conservative after he lost the whip in 2008, and did not contest the 2010 general election.

Nadine Dorries was suspended from the Conservative Party after taking part in the television competition I'm a Celebrity...Get Me Out of Here! in November 2012, before regaining the Conservative whip in May 2013.

On 25 October 2016, Zac Goldsmith resigned from the House of Commons over the planned expansion of Heathrow Airport, triggering a by-election, which Goldsmith contested as an Independent, but without opposition from the Conservative Party. He was described as an Independent Conservative.

In April 2019, Nick Boles quit the Conservatives to sit as what he called an "Independent Progressive Conservative".

In September 2019, Amber Rudd quit the Conservatives over the disagreement that has been engaged in by their former 21 MP colleagues on the subject of Brexit, under Boris Johnson leadership. She decided not to seek re-election at the 2019 general election after initially planning to run as an Independent Conservative.

== In Canada ==
Independent Conservative members of parliament have also sat in the House of Commons of Canada, with a similar designation. In the 19th century, prior to the solidification of the party system, it was common in Canada for Independent Conservative and Independent Liberal members to be elected, sometimes defeating official Conservative or Liberal candidates.

In the 1940 Canadian federal election, Joseph Sasseville Roy was elected to represent Gaspé as an Independent Conservative. He had declined to run as an official Conservative due to his disagreement with the party's policy on conscription, which was unpopular in Quebec. Henri Courtemanche was elected as an "Independent Progressive Conservative" in Labelle in 1957 and subsequently rejoined the Progressive Conservative Party of Canada. Maurice Allard was elected to the Commons as an "Independent Progressive Conservative" in Sherbrooke at the 1965 federal election, defeating the official Progressive Conservative candidate. A former Progressive Conservative politician, Allard had quit the party in 1963 due to his opposition to its leader, John Diefenbaker.

Since then, it has been more usual for Independent Conservatives at the national level to be Conservatives who have voluntarily resigned the party whip or who have been expelled from the party. Bill Casey sat in the House of Commons for Cumberland—Colchester—Musquodoboit Valley as an "Independent Progressive Conservative" after he was expelled from the Conservative Party of Canada caucus for stating that the Conservative government's 2007 budget had violated the Atlantic Accord. Casey was re-elected at the 2008 Canadian federal election with almost 70 per cent of the vote.

Patrick Brazeau was an Independent Conservative Senator until he was expelled from sitting in the Senate due to his arrest for assault. Pamela Wallin is a current Independent Conservative Senator who lost her position in the party's caucus due to a spending scandal. In 2008, Brent Rathgeber was elected as Conservative MP for Edmonton—St. Albert; he left the Conservative Party's caucus in 2013 to become an Independent Conservative MP, accusing Prime Minister Stephen Harper of exerting authoritarian control over the government through the Prime Minister's Office. He served until the 2015 federal election, when he lost to regular Conservative candidate Michael Cooper in St. Albert—Edmonton, a reorganized version of his previous constituency.

== See also ==
- Independent Liberal
- Independent Republican
- Independent Unionist
- Miscellaneous right
