= 1933 Hitchin by-election =

UK parliamentary by-election

← 1931	8 June 1933	1935 →

The Hitchin seat in the House of Commons. Triggered by death of incumbent
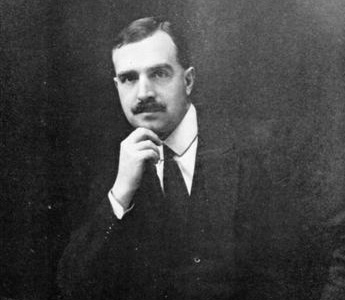
Candidate	Arnold Wilson	William Bennett
Party	Conservative	Labour
Popular vote	14,569	10,362
Percentage	58.4%	41.6%
MP before election
Antony Bulwer-Lytton
Conservative
Subsequent MP
Arnold Wilson
Conservative

The 1933 Hitchin by-election was held on 8 June 1933 after the incumbent Conservative MP, Antony Bulwer-Lytton died in a plane accident. It was won by the Conservative candidate Arnold Wilson.

Hitchin by-election, 1933 Electorate 48,580
Party	Candidate	Votes	%	±%
Conservative	Arnold Wilson	14,569	58.4	−17.3
Labour	William Bennett	10,362	41.6	+17.3
Majority		4,207	16.8	−34.6
Turnout		24,931	51.3	−19.8
Registered electors		48,580		
Conservative hold		Swing	−17.3	
