= 1941 Hitchin by-election =

UK Parliamentary by-election

The 1941 Hitchin by-election was held on 10 March 1941. Called in consequence of the death of the incumbent Conservative MP, Arnold Wilson, it was won (unopposed) by the Conservative Party candidate John Seymour Berry.
