= Enid Lapthorn =

Enid Lapthorn

Miss Enid Lapthorn (23 July 1889 – 18 November 1967), was a British Liberal Party and later Liberal National politician.

== Background ==
She was the eldest daughter of Thomas Henry Field Lapthorn J.P. and Elsie May Nicholson of Southsea in Hampshire. Her father was also actively involved in politics for the Liberal party serving as President of Portsmouth Liberal Association. He also stood as Liberal candidate for Portsmouth North at the 1922 General Election.

== Professional career ==
During the 1914-1918 war she worked in His Majesty's Postal Censorship and Prisoners of War Bureau in Bern, Switzerland. She also acted as Secretary to the British Passport Office in Prague, and as a translator for the Guaranty Trust Company in New York City.

== Political career ==
She was Secretary of the Liberal Social Council from 1924 to 1926. In February 1928 she was selected as Liberal candidate for the safe Unionist seat of Hitchin in Hertfordshire, for a general election expected to take place before the end of 1929. In 1928 she served on the Liberal party Campaign Committee. When the general election came she managed to increase the Liberal share of the vote and overtake the Labour candidate to finish second;

General Election 1929: Hitchin Electorate 44,967
Party	Candidate	Votes	%	±%
Unionist	Guy Molesworth Kindersley	14,786	44.8	−14.4
Liberal	Miss Enid Lapthorn	9,325	28.3	+11.9
Labour	R W Gifford	8,880	26.9	+2.5
Majority		5,461	16.5	−18.3
Turnout			73.4	+3.9
Unionist hold		Swing		

She did not stand for parliament again but remained active in the Liberal party. In 1929 she was elected to serve on the Liberal party Organisation Committee for 1930. She served as Chairman of the Liberal Social Council. Following the formation of the all-party National Government she did not contest the 1931 General Election. In Hitchin, the local Liberal Association had decided not to oppose the sitting Conservative who supported the National Government. After the Liberal party split over its support for the National Government she gravitated to the Liberal Nationals who remained in support of the National Government. In 1936-37 she was Honorary Secretary of the Liberal National Council (Women's Section). She took a particular interest in foreign affairs and the threat of war. In 1934 at a Liberal conference she spoke on the subject of 'Prospects of Disarmament'. In April 1935 she worked as secretary to Margery Corbett Ashby at the Disarmament Conference in Geneva, and wrote in The Liberal Woman's News after a visit to Germany that she would like to write about the 'prevalent attitude to women' there but felt that war and peace were more important. In 1937 she attended the Liberal National annual conference at which she successfully moved a resolution urging the government to strengthen the League of Nations in an effort to control the dictatorships through collective action.
