= Robert Cecil, Viscount Cecil of Chelwood =

British lawyer, politician and diplomat (1864–1958)

The Right Honourable The Viscount Cecil of Chelwood CH PC QC
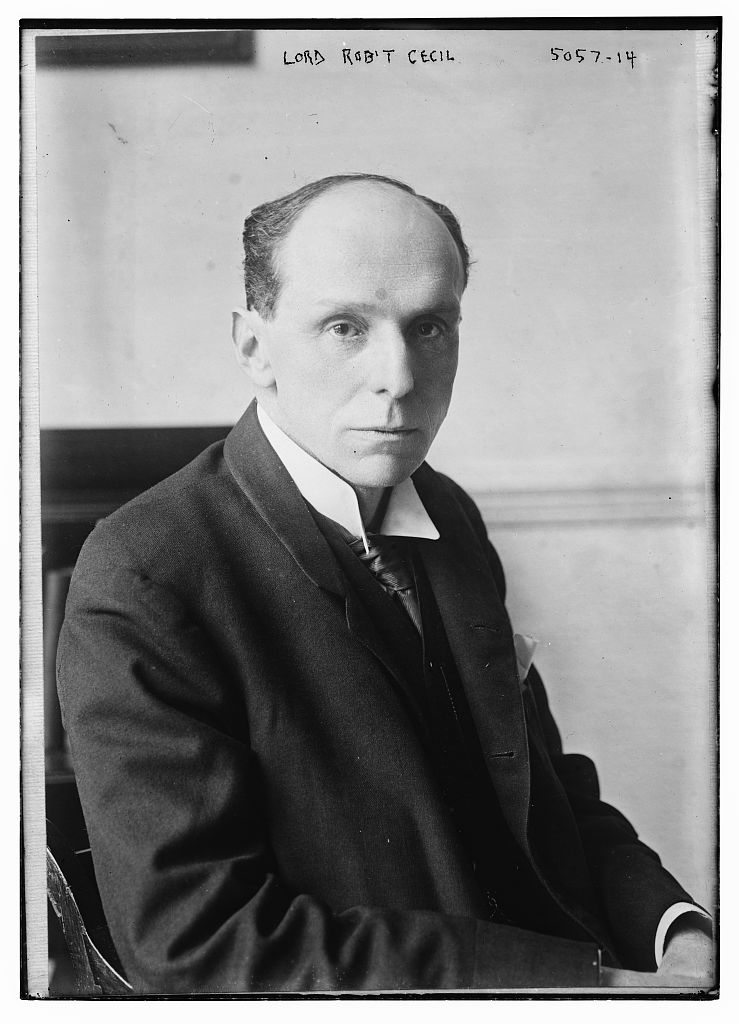
- Cecil in 1915

Chancellor of the Duchy of Lancaster
- In office 10 November 1924 – 19 October 1927
- Monarch: George V
- Prime Minister: Stanley Baldwin
- Preceded by: Josiah Wedgwood
- Succeeded by: The Lord Cushendum

Lord Keeper of the Privy Seal
- In office 28 May 1923 – 22 January 1924
- Monarch: George V
- Prime Minister: Stanley Baldwin
- Preceded by: Austen Chamberlain
- Succeeded by: John Robert Clynes

Parliamentary Under-Secretary of State for Foreign Affairs
- In office 30 May 1915 – 10 January 1919
- Monarch: George V
- Prime Minister: H. H. Asquith; David Lloyd George
- Preceded by: Neil Primrose
- Succeeded by: Cecil Harmsworth

Member of the House of Lords Lord Temporal
- In office 28 December 1923 – 24 November 1958; Hereditary peerage

Member of Parliament for Hitchin
- In office 23 November 1911 – 16 November 1923
- Preceded by: Alfred Hillier
- Succeeded by: Guy Kindersley

Member of Parliament for Marylebone East
- In office 12 January 1906 – 15 January 1910
- Preceded by: Edmund Boulnois
- Succeeded by: James Boyton

Personal details
- Born: 14 September 1864 Cavendish Square, London, England
- Died: 24 November 1958 (aged 94) Danehill, East Sussex, England
- Party: Conservative
- Spouse: Lady Eleanor Lambton (m. 1889–1958)
- Parents: Robert Gascoyne-Cecil, 3rd Marquess of Salisbury (father); Georgina Alderson (mother)
- Education: University College, Oxford (MA)
- Profession: Lawyer
- Awards: Nobel Peace Prize (1937)

Edgar Algernon Robert Gascoyne-Cecil, 1st Viscount Cecil of Chelwood, CH, PC, QC (14 September 1864 – 24 November 1958), known as Lord Robert Cecil from 1868 to 1923, was a British lawyer, politician and diplomat. He was one of the architects of the League of Nations and a defender of it, whose service to the organisation saw him awarded the Nobel Peace Prize in 1937.

== Early life and legal career ==
Cecil was born at Cavendish Square, London, the sixth child and third son of Robert Gascoyne-Cecil, 3rd Marquess of Salisbury, three times prime minister, and Georgina, daughter of Sir Edward Hall Alderson. He was the brother of James Gascoyne-Cecil, 4th Marquess of Salisbury, Lord William Cecil, Lord Edward Cecil and Lord Quickswood and the cousin of Arthur Balfour, with whom he had common grandparents: James Brownlow William Gascoyne-Cecil and Frances Mary Gascoyne (1802–1839), the only daughter and heiress of Bamber Gascoyne (1757–1824) of Childwall, Liverpool, Lancashire, member of Parliament for Liverpool (1780–96). Cecil was educated at home until he was thirteen and then spent four years at Eton College. He claimed in his autobiography to have enjoyed his home education most. He studied law at University College, Oxford, where he became a well-known debater. His first job was as private secretary to his father, when commencing in office as prime minister from 1886 to 1888. In 1887, he was called to the bar by the Inner Temple. He was fond of saying that his marriage to Lady Eleanor Lambton, daughter of George Lambton, 2nd Earl of Durham on 22 January 1889, was the cleverest thing he had ever done.

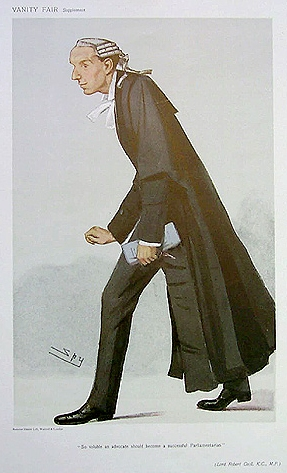
Robert Cecil Vanity Fair 22 February 1906

From 1887 to 1906, Cecil practised civil law, including work in Chancery and parliamentary practice. On 15 June 1899, he was appointed a Queen's Counsel. After the outbreak of the Second Boer War, he enrolled as a recruit in the Inns of Court Rifles in February 1900, but he never saw active service. He also collaborated in writing a book, entitled Principles of Commercial Law. In 1910 he was appointed a member of the General Council of the Bar, and a Bencher of the Inner Temple. He was already a Justice of the Peace when he was raised the following year as Chairman of the Hertfordshire Quarter Sessions.

== Unionist free trader ==
Cecil was a convinced believer in free trade, opposing Joseph Chamberlain's agitation for Tariff Reform, denouncing it as "a rather sordid attempt to ally Imperialism with State assistance for the rich". In February 1905, he compiled for party leader Arthur Balfour a memorandum on 'The Attack on Unionist Free Trade Seats' in which he quoted a letter to The Times by a member of the Tariff Reform League that stated it would oppose free trade candidates, whether Unionist or Liberal. Cecil argued that he had identified at least 25 seats in which such attacks had taken place. At the 1906 general election, Cecil was elected as a Conservative Member of Parliament representing Marylebone East.

In January 1908, Cecil wrote to fellow Unionist free trader Arthur Elliot: "To me, the greatest necessity of all is to preserve, if possible, a foothold for Free Trade within the Unionist party. For, if not, I and others who think like me, will be driven to imperil either free trade or other causes such as religious education, the House of Lords, and even the Union, which seem to us of equal importance". In March 1910 Cecil and his brother Lord Hugh, unsuccessfully appealed to Chamberlain that he should postpone advocating food taxes at the next election in order to concentrate on opposing Irish Home Rule.

He did not contest the Marylebone seat in either general election in 1910 as a result of the tariff reform controversy. Instead he unsuccessfully contested Blackburn in the January election and Wisbech in the December election. In 1911, he won a by-election in Hitchin, Hertfordshire, as an Independent Conservative and served as its MP until 1923.

== Minister during First World War ==
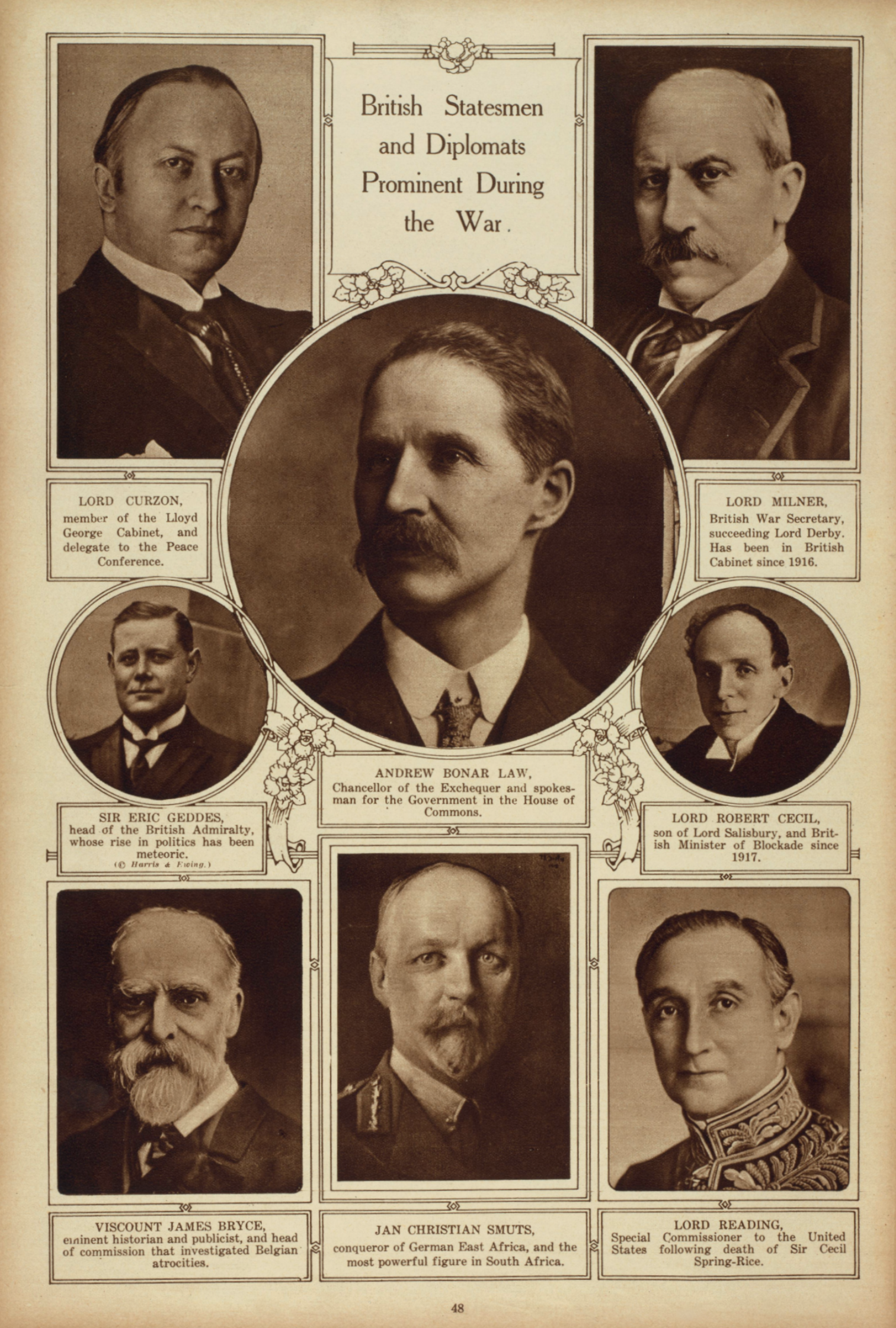
British Statesmen During The Great War

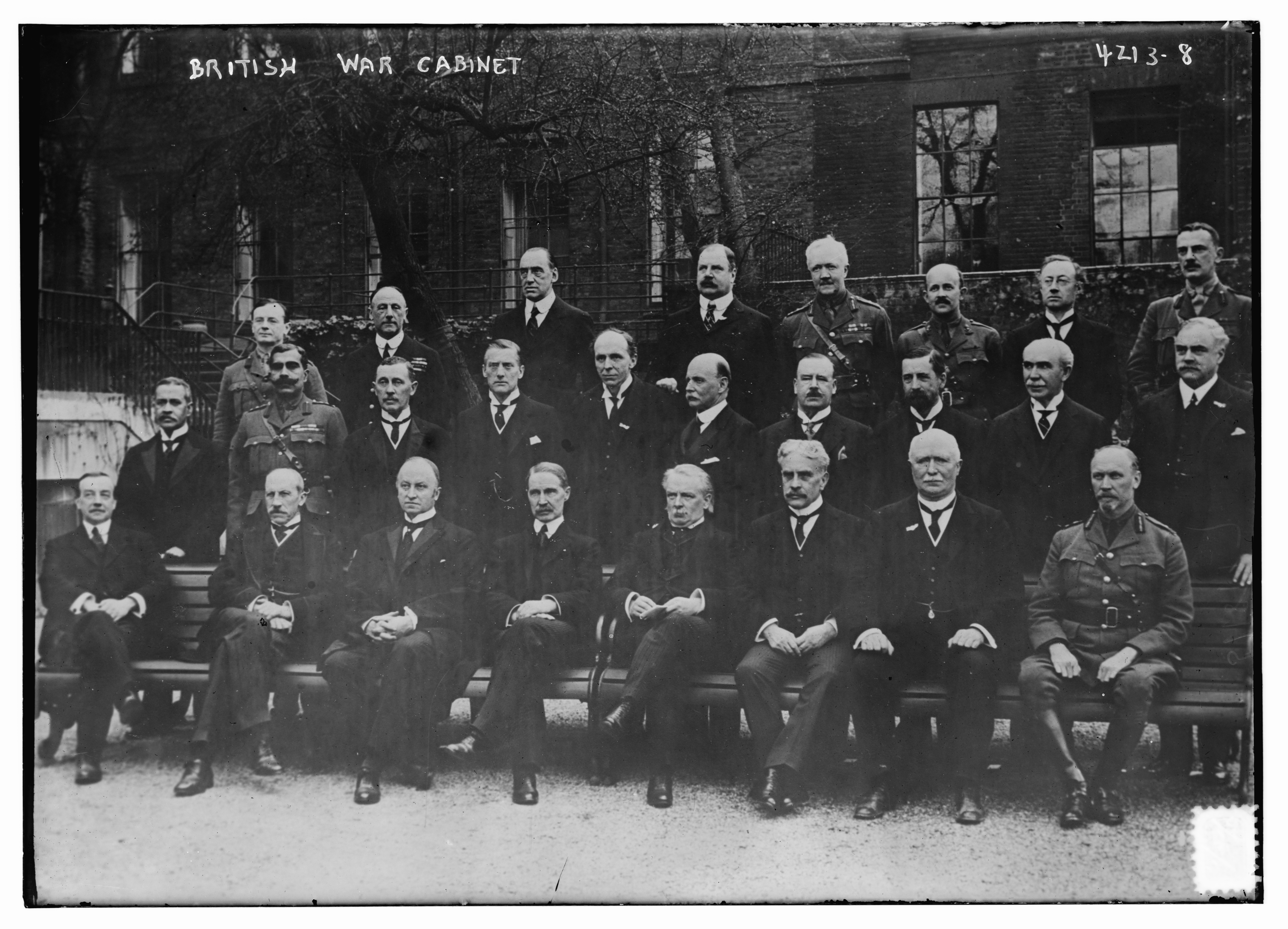
Cecil in the Imperial War Cabinet, 1917 (middle row, 5th from left)

During World War I, Cecil worked for the Red Cross. He was made Vicar-General to the Archbishop of York on account of his deep religious convictions and commitment to pacifism. Following the formation of the 1915 coalition government, he became Parliamentary Under-Secretary of State for Foreign Affairs on 30 May 1915; on 16 June he was sworn of the Privy Council, and was promoted to Assistant Secretary in 1918–19. He served in this post until 10 January 1919, additionally serving in the cabinet as Minister of Blockade between 23 February 1916 and 18 July 1918. He was responsible for devising procedures to bring economic and commercial pressure against the enemy forcing them to choose between feeding their occupying military forces or their civilian population. After the war, in 1919, he was made an Honorary Fellow, and granted his MA of University College, Oxford, as well as an Honorary Doctorate of Civil Law, apt for a university chancellor which he by then was.

== Formation of League of Nations ==
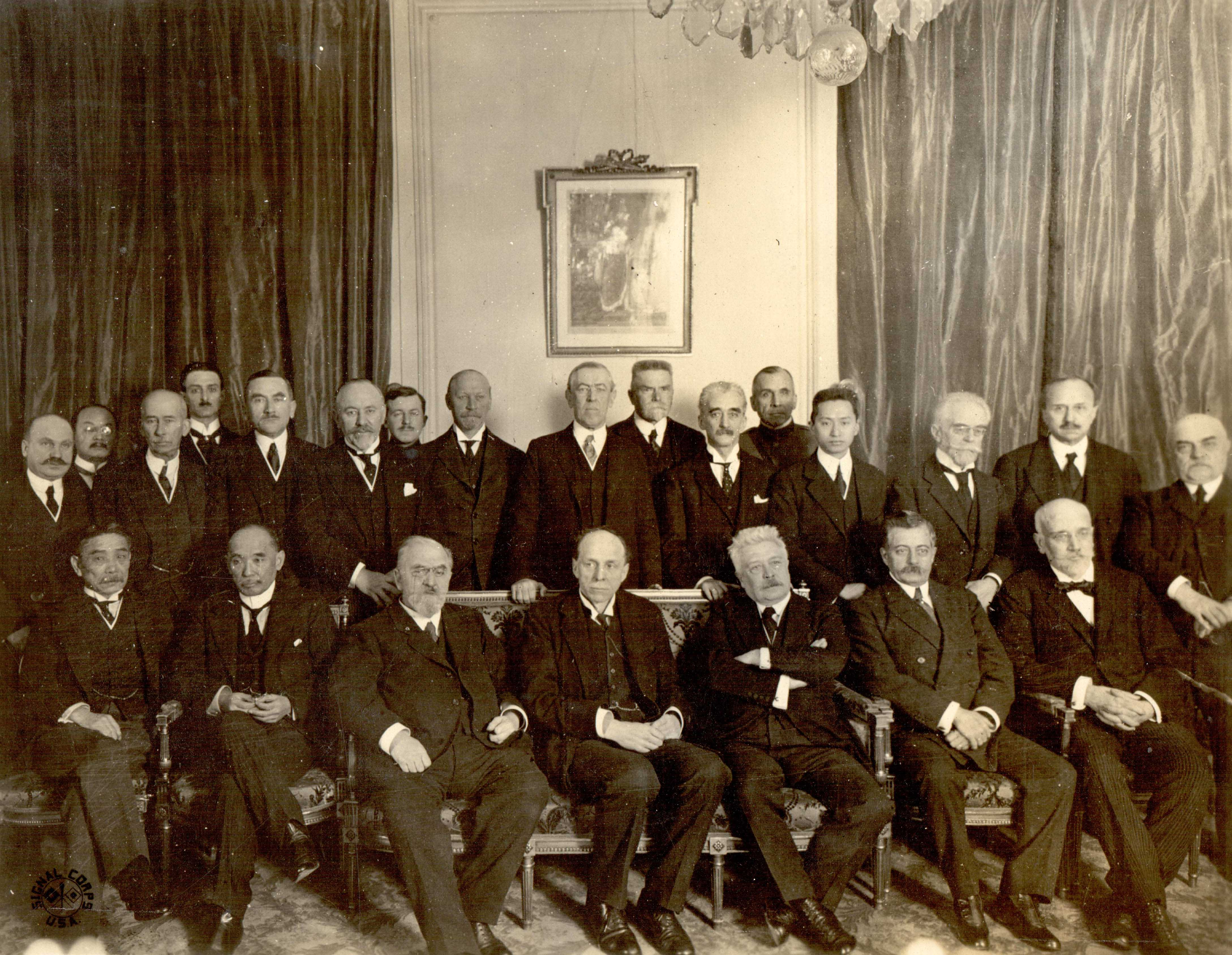
Photo of the members of the commission of the League of Nations created by the Plenary Session of the Preliminary Peace Conference, Paris, France, 1919 (Cecil seated 4th from left)

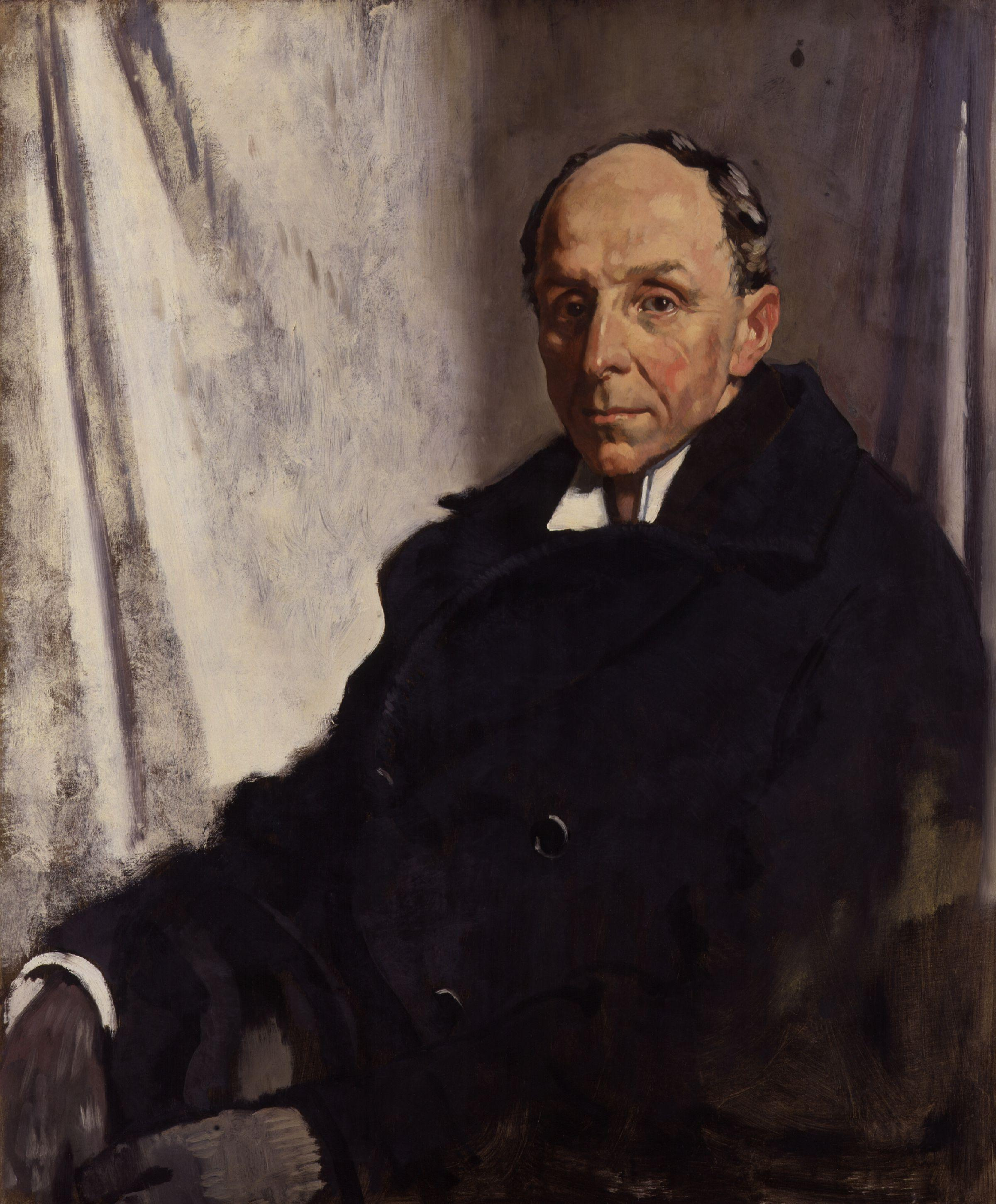
Lord Robert Cecil in 1919 by Sir William Orpen

In September 1916, he wrote and circulated a Memorandum on Proposals for Diminishing the Occasion of Future Wars in the Cabinet. Cecil noted the suffering and destruction of the war, along with the threat to European civilisation and the likelihood of postwar disputes. He urged an alternative to war as a means of settling international disputes and claimed that neither the destruction of German militarism nor a postwar settlement based on self-determination would guarantee peace. Cecil rejected compulsory arbitration but claimed a regular conference system would be unobjectionable. Peaceful procedures for settling disputes should be compulsory before there was any outbreak of fighting. Sanctions, including blockade, would be necessary to force countries to submit to peaceful procedures. If overwhelming naval and financial power could be combined in a peace system, "no modern State could ultimately resist its pressure". He hoped that America might be willing to "join in organized economic action to preserve peace". He later said that it was the "first document from which sprang British official advocacy of the League of Nations".

In May 1917 Cecil circulated his Proposals for Maintenance of Future Peace in which the signatories would agree to keep the postwar territorial settlement for five years, followed by a conference to consider and, if necessary, to implement necessary or desirable territorial changes. Countries would also agree to submit their international disputes to a conference and they would be forbidden to act until the conference had made a decision. However, states would be allowed to act unilaterally if, after three months, the conference had failed to make a decision. All decisions made by conferences would be enforced by all the signatories, "if necessary by force of arms". If a country resorted to war without submitting the dispute to a conference, the other countries would combine to enforce a commercial and financial blockade. Cecil had originally included proposals for disarmament but these were deleted from the final draft after a diplomat, Sir Eyre Crowe, submitted them to a "devastating critique" that persuaded Cecil they were impractical.

In November 1917, Cecil requested from Balfour the creation of a committee to consider the proposals for a League of Nations. Balfour granted it and in January 1918, a committee, chaired by Lord Phillimore, was established. In May 1918, with the Cabinet's permission, Cecil forwarded the Phillimore Report to the American President Woodrow Wilson and his advisor Colonel House.

In October 1918, Cecil circulated a paper on League proposals to the Cabinet after their request for advice. He argued that "no very elaborate machinery" would be required as the proposals rejected any form of international government, but the League would be limited to a treaty binding the signatories never to go to war until a conference had been called. If a country went to war unilaterally, the signatories would use all the power at their command, economic and military, to defeat the aggressor. Cecil viewed the three months' delay before countries resorted to war as the principal role of the League as that would give public opinion time to exert its peaceful influence. The Cabinet received the paper "respectfully rather than cordially" and made no decision upon it. Cecil used the paper as the basis for a speech on the subject of the League delivered at his inauguration as Chancellor of the University of Birmingham on 12 November. On 22 November Cecil resigned from the government due to his opposition to Welsh disestablishment. He wrote to Gilbert Murray afterwards, saying that he hoped to do more for the establishment of a League of Nations outside the government than within it.

In late November 1918, Cecil was appointed the head of the League of Nations section of the Foreign Office. A. E. Zimmern had written a memorandum elaborating the functions of the League and Cecil selected it as a base to work from. He ordered that a summary of the actual organisation involved in implementing its proposals be written. On 14 December, he was presented with the Brief Conspectus of League of Nations Organization, which would later be called the Cecil Plan at the Paris Peace Conference. The Plan included regular conferences between the signatories, which would be "the pivot of the League" and that they would have to be unanimous. Annual conferences of prime ministers and foreign secretaries would be complemented by quadrennial meetings between the signatories. A great power could summon a conference, with all members being able to do so if there was a danger of war. The great powers would control the League, with the smaller powers exercising little considerable influence. On 17 December, Cecil submitted the Cecil Plan to the Cabinet. The Cabinet discussed the idea of the League on 24 December, with Cecil being the leading pro-League speaker.

The Paris Peace Conference included a League of Nations Commission, which was responsible for creating a scheme for a League, including the drafting of the Covenant of the League of Nations. Cecil viewed Wilson's draft for the League and in his diary, he wrote that it was "a very bad document, badly expressed, badly arranged, and very incomplete". On 27 January Cecil and American legal expert David Hunter Miller spent four hours revising Wilson's proposals in what became known as the Cecil-Miller draft. It included granting more powers in the League to the great powers, granting the Dominions their own seats, a revision of Wilson's arbitration proposals and the inclusion of a permanent international court. In further negotiations, Cecil was successful in retaining important parts of the British draft. When Wilson tried to amend it, House warned him against alienating Cecil, as he "was the only man connected with the British Government who really had the League of Nations at heart". Cecil was disappointed in Lloyd George's lack of enthusiasm for the League and repeatedly threatened resignation because of some of Lloyd George's tactics.

Cecil was greatly concerned at Republican opposition to the League and sought to concede some of Wilson's demands to secure American acceptance of the League. That included protecting the Monroe Doctrine in the Covenant. On 21 April, the British Empire delegation met Cecil, who assured them that Dominion criticism of the draft Covenant had been considered and that the new draft avoided "the impression that a super State was being created". The Canadians objected that while the risk of Canada being invaded was unlikely, the risks to France or the Balkans were much more likely but had not been taken into consideration. Furthermore, the League loaded Canada with more liabilities than it had by being a member of the Empire. Cecil argued that the Council of the League would determine when that obligation would be fulfilled and that its requirement for decisions to be unanimous allowed a Canadian delegate to object, which would cause the end of the matter. George Egerton, in his history of the creation of the League, claimed that Cecil "more than anyone else, deserved credit for the successful outcome of the second phase of the work of the League of Nations Commission".

After the Treaty of Versailles was first presented to Germany, Cecil argued strongly that it should be made less harsh on Germany and that Germany should be allowed to join the League. Cecil left Paris on 9 June, his hopes of a revision of the treaty disappointed.

== League of Nations Union ==
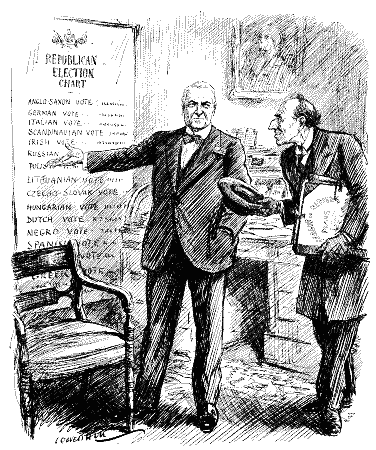
Encourage Home Industries. Lord Robert Cecil. "I trust that after all we may secure at least your qualified support for our League of Nations?" U.S.A. President-elect: "Why, what's the matter with ours?" Cartoon from Punch magazine, 10 November 1920, depicting Cecil advocating a design for the League of Nations to Warren G. Harding

Upon returning to Britain, Cecil eagerly planned the activities of the League of Nations Union. Cecil's public life from then on was almost totally devoted to the League; he was its president of the Union from 1923 to 1945. He chaired a reconstruction committee of the Union in July 1919, his primary aim being to ensure that the Union built a powerful pro-League lobby in Britain to make sure that the government put the League at the centre of its foreign policy. Cecil also sought to broaden the membership of the Union, which had largely consisted of Asquithian Liberals, by soliciting the support of Conservatives and Labour.

Cecil was an Esperantist, and, in 1921, he proposed that the League of Nations adopt Esperanto as solution to the language problem.

From 1920 to 1922, he represented the Union of South Africa in the League Assembly. In 1923, he made a five-week tour of the United States, explaining the League to American audiences. He helped draft the League's 1923 Draft Treaty of Mutual Assistance, which made war of aggression illegal. And one did take place all League members would send troops to defend the victim. His own government opposed the plan and it was never adopted.

He believed that "the war ha[d] shattered the prestige of the European governing classes" and that their disappearance had created a vacuum that needed to be filled if disaster was to be averted. The primary solution was the construction of a European order on the basis of Christian morality, with a machinery of legal conciliation by which "Junkerism and Chauvinism" would be destroyed. The Treaty of Versailles had failed to create that.

His belief in free trade and the League were part of his Cobdenite vision of a world where trade, self-sacrifice and international cooperation went together, along with international adjudication and mutual guarantees of peace. The League was not just a solution to war but also guaranteed that civilisation would be preserved within each member state, including in Britain where "the League point of view [ran] through all politics - Ireland, Industry, even Economy...[involving] a new way of looking at things political - or rather a reversion" to Victorian morality.

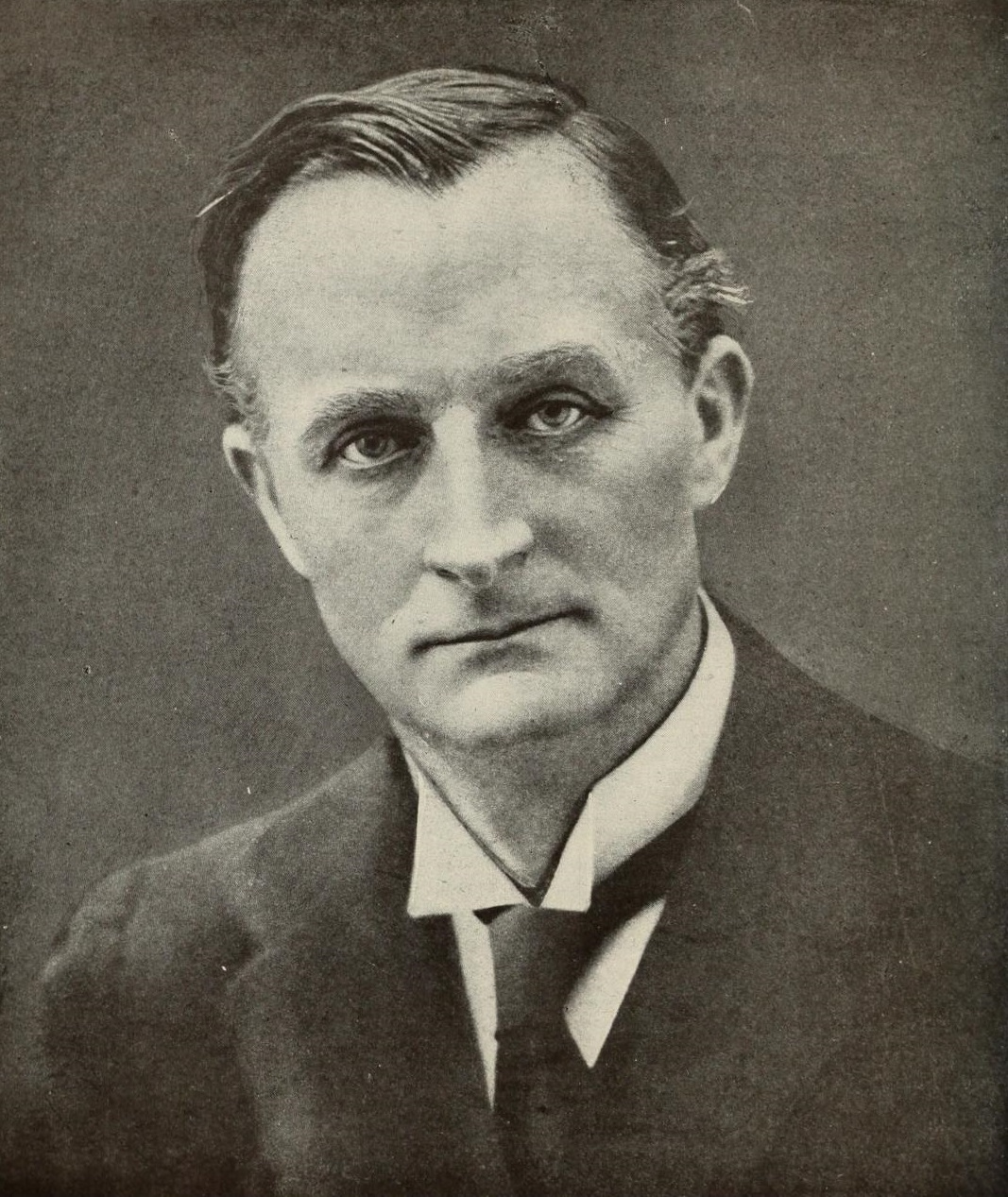
Viscount (formerly Sir Edward) Grey. Cecil wished to replace Lloyd George as Prime Minister with Grey, whom he greatly admired

=== Possible party realignment ===
Cecil regarded "class war, whether the class attacked be landowners or Labour, [as] the most insidious form of national disintegration". From 1920, Cecil wanted to bring down Lloyd George and his coalition government by forming a progressive alliance between anti-coalition and anti-socialist forces. He had been an enemy of Lloyd George for longer than any other major politician.

He wanted to create an anti-socialist centre party led by former Foreign Secretary Viscount Grey, regarding him as the embodiment of "justice" which had been Britain's "greatest National asset...in foreign affairs... for the last two generations". The party would not be anti-working class and would include "the best of the Liberal and Labour people" and "some of the old landowning Tories". He supported Asquith in the Paisley by-election of February 1920 and wanted an electoral agreement between Labour and pro-League candidates. In mid-July 1920, Cecil was still keen for a realignment under Grey, who was keener on the League of Nations than Asquith, whom Cecil thought still influential in the country but no longer a leader.

With his brother Hugh Cecil, he resigned the Conservative whip in February 1921. In 1921 Cecil abandoned his attempt to form a centre party but still wanted Grey to return to active politics. Talks between Grey and Cecil began in June 1921. A wider meeting (Cecil, Asquith, Grey and leading Asquithian Liberals Lord Crewe, Runciman and Sir Donald Maclean) was held on 5 July 1921. Cecil wanted a genuine coalition, rather than a de facto Liberal government, with Grey, rather than Asquith, as prime minister and a formal manifesto by himself and Grey that Asquith and Crewe would then endorse as the official Liberal leaders. Another Conservative, Sir Arthur Steel-Maitland, later joined in the talks, and his views were similar to Cecil's, but Maclean, Runciman and Crewe were hostile. In July Cecil wrote a public letter to his constituency association attacking the coalition government.

Grey himself was not keen, and his failing eyesight would have been a major handicap to his becoming prime minister. He made, however, a move by speaking in his former constituency in October 1921, to little effect. After Grey's speech, Cecil published a second letter in which he announced he would co-operate with a Grey government. In November, when the Irish situation looked likely to cause the fall of the coalition, Cecil wrote to the King urging him to appoint Grey as prime minister.

In April 1922, in another constituency letter, he distanced himself from other anti-coalition Conservatives by insisting on the importance of not being reactionary, and in May, he claimed that the dominant force within the Conservatives was a group of men who only cared for "the preservation of its property". He again announced his willingness to serve under Grey in a government based on industrial cooperation and support for the League. However Cecil became disillusioned with the Liberals' opposition to reconstructing the party system and so he declined an invitation to join the Liberals so long as Asquith remained leader, rather than Grey. With the fall of the Lloyd George coalition in October and the appointment of Bonar Law as Conservative prime minister, Cecil pledged to support the new government though he was not offered office.

=== Traditional Tory in a modernizing world ===
In Baldwin's Conservative administrations of 1923 to 1924 and 1924 to 1927, he was the minister responsible, under the jurisdiction of the Foreign Secretary, for British activities in League affairs. On 28 May 1923, Cecil returned to the cabinet as Lord Privy Seal, a position held by several members of his family.

Cecil wrote to Baldwin on 29 October 1923, offering his support on tariff reform if Baldwin would adopt a vigorous pro-League policy in return. He stated that Britain's economic problems could not be solved by tariffs, rather by solving the collapse of European credit, war debts and "international suspicion" and withdrawing support from all international organisations except the League. Because of his disagreement with the Conservatives' policy of tariffs, Cecil did not stand in the general election of December 1923. After the Conservatives lost their majority, he was raised to the peerage as Viscount Cecil of Chelwood, of East Grinstead in the County of Sussex, on 28 December 1923. He remained Lord Privy Seal until 22 February 1924, When Ramsay MacDonald's minority Labour government took office, MacDonald apologised to Cecil for not retaining him as the government's League minister. But at the period Chelwood was rewarded by being asked to be Rector of Aberdeen University, when they granted him an Honorary Doctorate of Law.

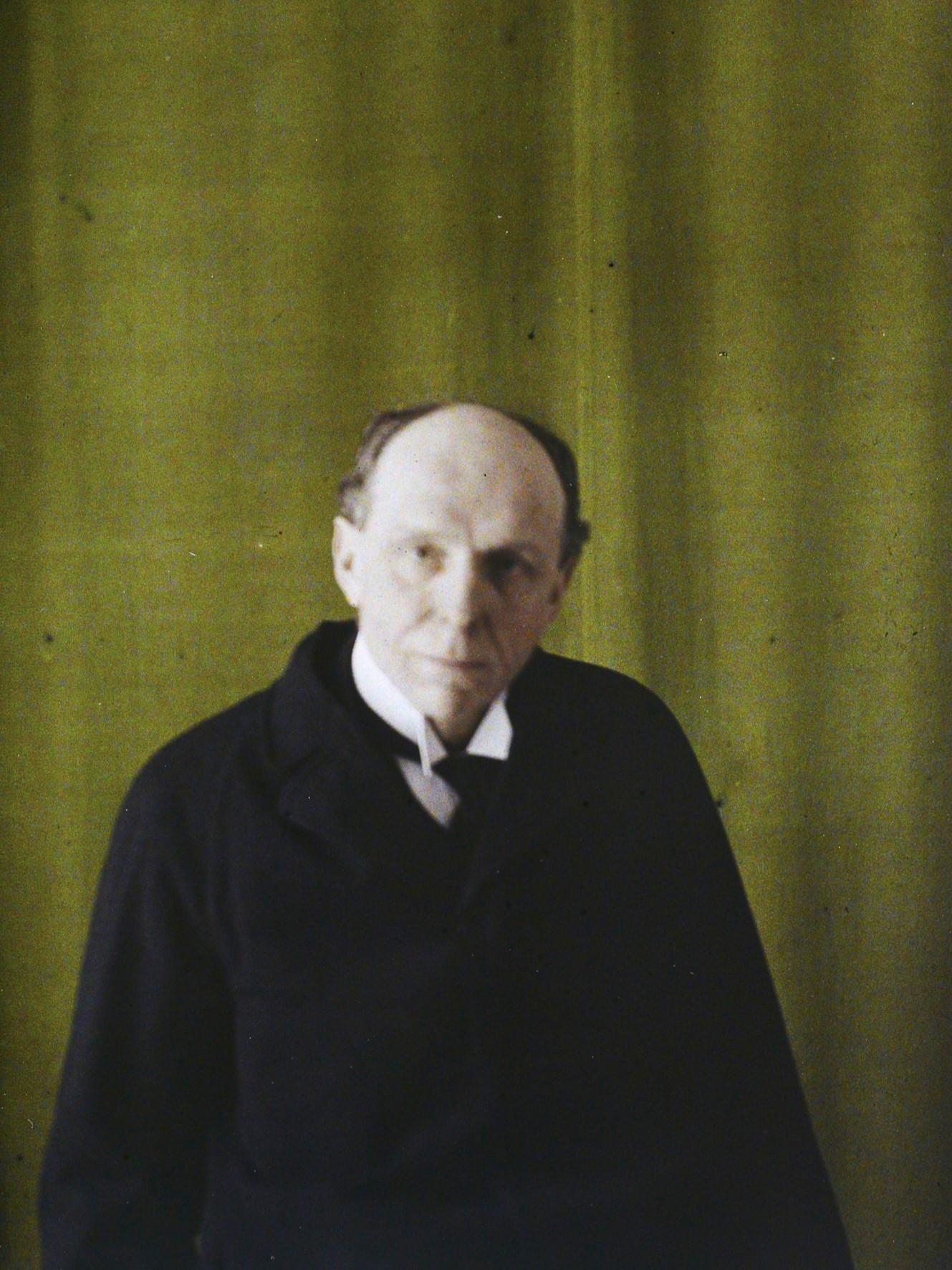
Autochrome portrait by Georges Chevalier, 1923

The Conservatives returned to power at the October 1924 general election and Cecil was asked by Stanley Baldwin to be Chancellor of the Duchy of Lancaster. He led the British delegation to the Opium Conference at Geneva in 1925. During a naval conference of 1927 in Geneva, negotiations broke down after the United States refused to agree that Britain needed a minimum of seventy cruisers for adequate defence of the British Empire, its trade and communications. Cutting the number of British cruisers from seventy to fifty was proposed by the US in return for concessions over their size and the calibre of their guns. Cecil, a member of the British delegation, resigned from the cabinet because the British government let the conference break down, rather than reduce the number of Royal Navy cruisers.

Cecil was very concerned about the increasing social problems and public dangers associated with the growth in popularity of the motor car. In 1929, Cecil accepted the post of president of the newly formed Pedestrians Association who were to campaign successfully to introduce many new measures to benefit pedestrians.

Although an official delegate to the League as late as 1932, Cecil worked independently to mobilise public opinion in support of the League. He was joint founder and president, with Pierre Cot, a French jurist, of the International Peace Campaign, known in France as Rassemblement universel pour la paix. Among his publications during this period were The Way of Peace (1928), a collection of lectures on the League; A Great Experiment (1941), a personalised account of his relationship to the League of Nations; and All the Way (1949), a more complete autobiography.

The Japanese invasion of Manchuria, which began in 1931, was a flagrant breach of the Covenant of the League of Nations. The World Disarmament Conference began in February 1932, and disarmament meant that Britain was powerless to stop Japanese aggression. Baldwin told Thomas Jones on 27 February, "The very people like Bob Cecil who have made us disarm, and quite right too, are now urging us forward to take action. But where will action take us?... If you enforce an economic boycott you will have war declared by Japan and she will seize Singapore and Hong Kong and we cannot, as we are placed, stop her".

Cecil wrote to Baldwin in July that he found himself "more and more out of sympathy with modern Conservatism" and he considered the government's disarmament proposals made at Geneva "quite inadequate". In March 1933, he complained to Baldwin that the technical advisers, especially British ones, had sabotaged the prospect of abolishing aircraft and of bombing, particularly from those who wanted to retain it for areas such as the North-West frontier of India.

Cecil's experience at the Geneva Disarmament Conference convinced him that the League was being jeopardised by "Hankeyism", the idea that the balance of power and national interests of countries were the only basis of international relations, which was named after the Secretary to the Committee of Imperial Defence (1912–1938) Sir Maurice Hankey. He admired Anthony Eden, Lord Halifax and Baldwin but regarded MacDonald as an enemy of the League and disliked Lord Londonderry and Lord Hailsham and criticised Sir John Simon as "the worst Foreign Secretary since Derby in 1876".

=== Cecil and appeasement ===
After Adolf Hitler became Chancellor of Germany in January 1933, Cecil was still hopeful of progress in disarmament. He favoured "the total abolition of naval and military aircraft, plus the creation of an international" civil air force along with German equality in aircraft. Later still in 1933 he advocated "the abolition of aggressive arms" as "the power of the defensive" would mean that "France and the smaller countries would be safer than...in any other way". In October, a month before the Germans left the conference, Cecil said in a broadcast that the "rules governing [German] disarmament" should be "the same in principle as those governing the armaments of any other civilised power" and in a letter to Gilbert Murray he said "Goebbels [had] made rather a favourable impression at Geneva and [was] said to be quite pleased with the League". He deplored the Nazis' education policy, however.

In April 1934, Cecil wrote to Philip Noel-Baker that Baldwin had told him that an attempt by Hankey to find a practical way of internationalising civil aviation had failed to which Cecil replied that he "did not think Hankey was a very good adviser on such questions as he disapproved of peace and disarmament". Hankey had been an early critic of the feasibility of a League of Nations: in 1919 he complained that the British representatives on the League Commission, Cecil and Smuts, were idealists; Cecil was "not very practical on this particular question. I am afraid their scheme will prove unworkable for two reasons, first, that it attempts too much, and second, that not enough attention is given to the machine". In 1923 he wrote that Cecil was a "crank".

In 1934, Cecil criticised the British government for the missed opportunity of gaining French co-operation at the conference after the electoral victory of the French Radicals. In August he wrote to Murray that because Baldwin had quoted the "arch-militarist F. S. Oliver" in declaring that Britain's real frontier was on the Rhine, he was very far from a League frame of mind and that the government "ought to go" in spite of "the intellectual nonentity of the Labour party". He denounced the worldwide spread of nationalism and the outbreak of isolationism in Britain, claiming that isolation was a "principle of anarchy" and that in modern conditions countries could "no more live alone than individuals". The British government in Cecil's view was so anti-League that he should sever his connections with the Conservatives and began to favour relations with Labour.

The Stresa Front of 1935 between Britain, France and Italy received Cecil's criticism because it appeared to be an alliance in which Germany was excluded and condoned their failure to disarm. Cecil wrote to Baldwin, arguing that Hitler should be given a chance to sign a disarmament treaty, though he doubted whether this would be effective because everything that Hitler had hitherto done, along with Prussian practice of the last two centuries, suggested that it would fail. But after its likely failure, the League would have reason for contemplating the "economic and financial measures which might be applied to a state endangering peace by the unilateral repudiation of its international obligations".

In June 1935, Cecil believed that a "collective threat from the League or a breach of British friendship" would prevent the Italian invasion of Abyssinia of 1935 and 1936. The attempt to prevent it by ceding a part of British Somaliland to Italy met with Cecil's approval. Later that year Cecil used the Union to pressure the government into League action against Italy. He also favoured oil sanctions and the closure of the Suez Canal (even if this breached international law). He became increasingly favourable towards Labour's attitude to foreign policy and in August he contemplated joining that party. At the general election held in November, he favoured the Union's policy of advising electors to vote for the candidate most likely to support the League. The Hoare-Laval Pact of December met with Cecil's disapproval because it would mean that "as between the League of Nations and Mussolini, Mussolini ha[d] won" and that Hoare had set back the only hope of showing that aggression did not pay. Cecil believed that France's suspicion of Germany was the main cause of the Pact and that Britain should therefore bargain with France possible British co-operation against Germany in return for French co-operation against Italy.

1935 saw the highest influence that Cecil and the Union had ever possessed. Thereafter, both went into sharp decline. The remilitarization of the Rhineland in March 1936 was to Cecil the "most dangerous crisis since 1914", but it could not be resolved by "letting off Italy" since "the security of France, of Russia and indeed of every country in Europe would now be greater had the League already proved by its defeat of Italian aggression that the organised community as a whole could stifle war". In April, Cecil believed that as Italy had to subdue Abyssinia quickly, Britain ought to favour existing sanctions and even increased sanctions against Italy. When Abyssinian resistance collapsed in May, Italy should have been expelled from the League to demonstrate that "an effective system of collective security" was possible. Otherwise, it would become obvious that the League was a "failure", that the Union was "bankrupt" and that collective security was a "farce".

Cecil tried to prevent Conservative withdrawal from the Union by presenting the League as "an almost ideal machinery" for the "preservation of the Empire". However, the Union further swung to the left and received complaints from Neville Chamberlain and Conservative Central Office about the left-wing tone of Union propaganda. In May 1938 Cecil complained that the government had "allowed the League to disintegrate" and in August that their "ambiguities and timidities" were failing to ensure that Hitler understood that further aggression would be a breach of international relations.

In May 1938, he said in a letter that German diplomacy had never in history been founded on honest dealing: "The Germans really conceive of their country as always under war conditions in this respect. No one expects a belligerent to tell the truth and, to the German mind, they are always belligerent. The Germans take the view that war is only intensified peace". Cecil was a critic of the Munich Agreement, whereby the German-speaking lands of Czechoslovakia were granted to Nazi Germany. He wrote to the Foreign Secretary Lord Halifax on 20 September 1938 that he "had not felt so bitterly on any public question since the fall of Khartoum" in 1885. The conduct of the government had completely alienated Cecil from the Conservatives.

In his memoirs, Cecil wrote that the wife of the Czechoslovak President, Edvard Beneš, telephoned him on behalf of her husband and asked for advice on the crisis: "I felt forced to reply that, much as I sympathized with her country, I could not advise her to rely on any help from mine. It was the only reply that could be made, but I have never felt a more miserable worm than I did when making it. To me and many others the transaction was as shameful as anything in our history". He further lamented, "Nothing was more painful in the whole of these... negotiations than the constant threats of the Germans to enforce by arms any of their demands which were resisted, threats to which we instantly submitted". He wrote a letter to The Guardian denouncing Munich: "But supposing there is a German guarantee, of what is its value? It is unnecessary to accuse Germany of perfidy. Not only the Nazi Government but all previous German Governments from the time of Frederick the Great downwards have made their position perfectly clear. To them, an international assurance is no more than a statement of present intention. It has no absolute validity for the future".

After the German invasion of the remaining Czechoslovak state in March 1939, Cecil was opposed to Eden rejoining the government because such a strengthening of Chamberlain would be a disaster. He had a low opinion of the Labour Party (except for Sir Stafford Cripps and Noel-Baker), whom he thought were doctrinaire and unpractical. In his view, Clement Attlee was "not a leader" and would have to be removed if Labour was to be effective. He wanted a "closer union between European states" against "nationalism" in the postwar settlement. In his 1941 book A Great Experiment, Cecil strongly criticised Sir John Simon, the Foreign Secretary between 1931 and 1935 for his weak response to the Japanese seizure of Manchuria region of China in 1931, which he believed had led directly to World War Two. Cecil argued that Simon should had the League of Nations impose sanctions on Japan in 1931, writing: "If it had been stopped by an united League of Nations, it could have had no successors. Above all, it encouraged aggressive Powers in Europe-first in Italy and then Germany-to set at nought the barrier so laboriously erected at Geneva against aggression, and brought us step by step to the present intensely grave position".

In the spring of 1946, he participated in the final meetings of the League at Geneva, ending his speech with the sentence: "The League is dead; long live the United Nations!"

== Later life ==
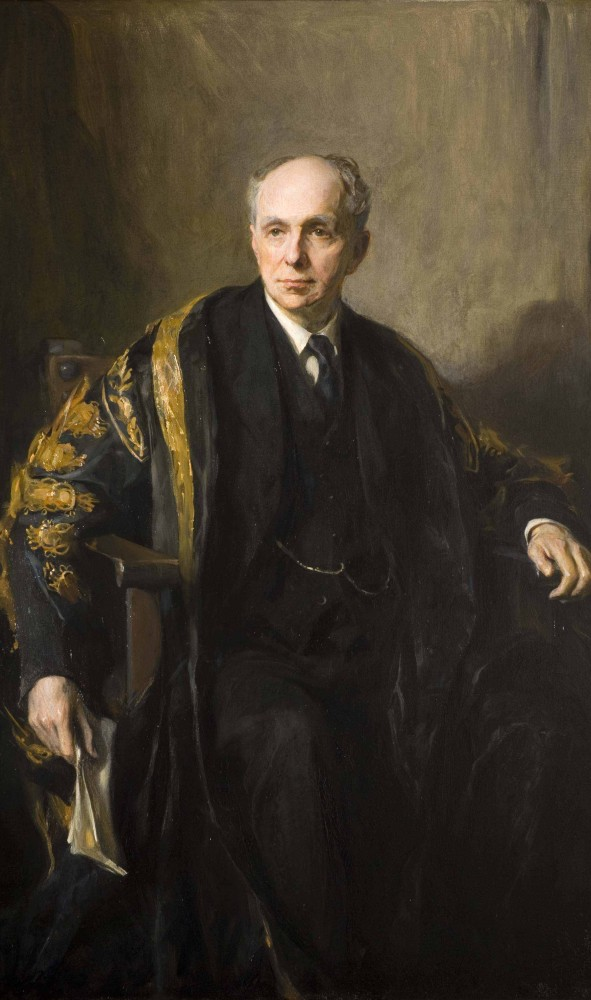
Cecil of Chelwood in 1932 in his Chancellor's robes at the University of Birmingham by Philip de László

He lived for thirteen more years, occasionally occupying his place in the House of Lords, and supporting international efforts for peace through his honorary life presidency of the United Nations Association.

In his last speech in the House of Lords on 23 April 1953, Cecil reiterated his commitment to world peace. He admitted that it is "the essence of national sovereignty that independent nations cannot be compelled, except by force of arms, to take action of which their Governments disapprove—and that remains true, whatever may be the terms of any general agreement they may have made. No elaborate or ingenious organisation will alter that fact".

He added that any plan for international peace must rest on Christian civilisation and "we British especially insist that in our own country, from the days of King Alfred to the present time, Christian civilisation has been responsible for every improvement and every advance that has been made". He said that that system had been attacked by Soviet Marxist dialectical materialism, "its central tenet is that there is no such thing as the spiritual nature of man, or, if there is, it should be ignored or stamped out as speedily as possible". However, "If you ignore or abolish the spiritual nature of man, you destroy the foundation on which rests all truth, justice and freedom, except such as can flow from the love of money or what money can buy". He advocated rearmament to prevent a Marxist attack and claimed that "Christian civilisation is the only real alternative to dialectical materialism". Unless there was a change in the principle of materialism, "I do not see how we can have any permanent security for peace".

== Honours ==
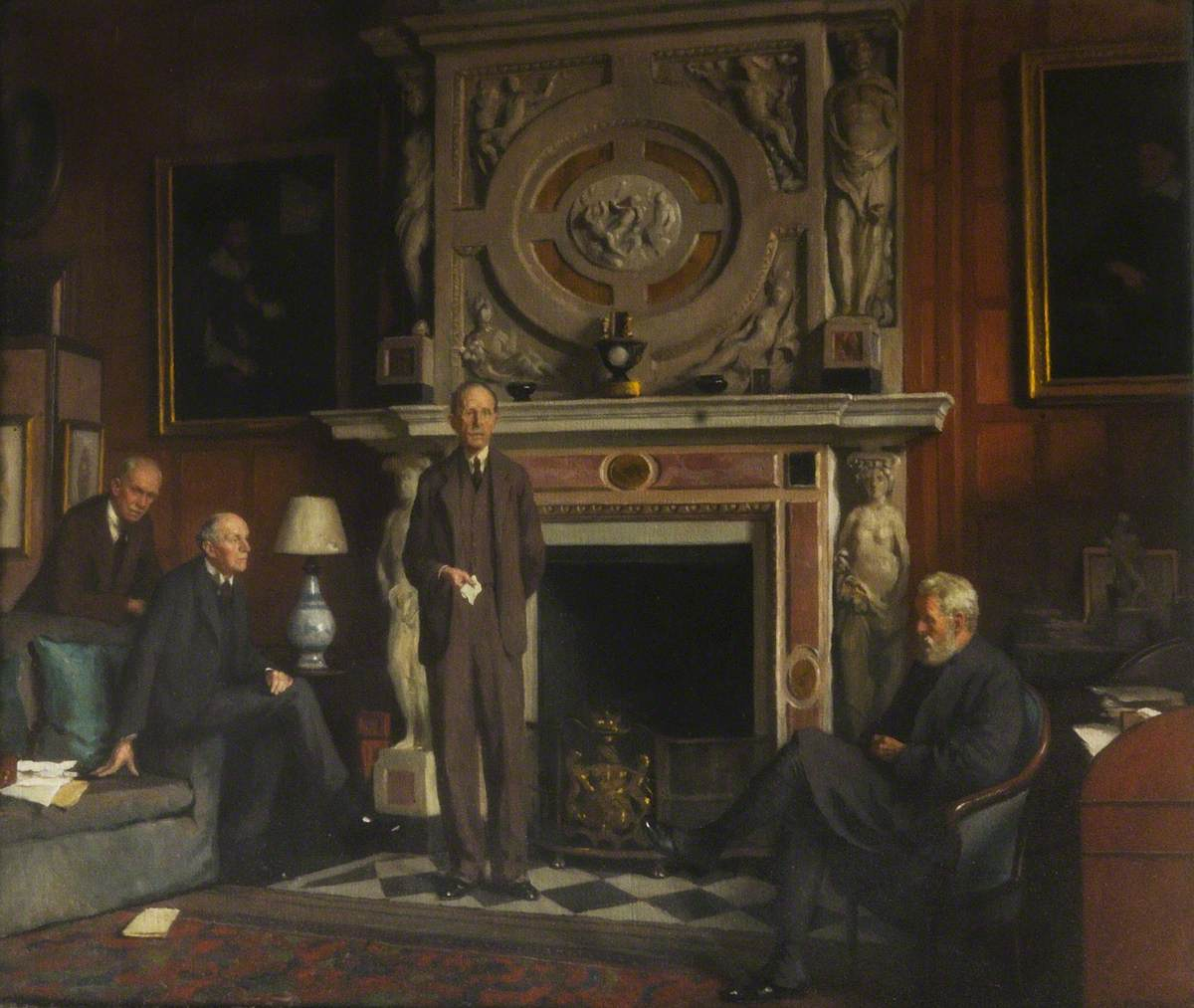
Group Portrait (before 1937) by Frederick Hawkesworth Sinclair Shepherd at University College University of Oxford of James (1861–1947), 4th Marquess of Salisbury; and His Brothers, Robert (1864–1958), Viscount Cecil of Chelwood; Lord William Cecil (1863–1936), Bishop of Exeter; Lord Hugh Cecil (1869–1956), Baron Quickswood. Robert was made Honorary Fellow in 1919.

Cecil's career brought him many honours. In addition to his peerage, he was appointed Member of the Order of the Companions of Honour in 1956, was elected chancellor of the University of Birmingham (1918–1944) and rector of the University of Aberdeen (1924–1927). He was given the Peace Award of the Woodrow Wilson Foundation in 1924. Most significantly, he was awarded the Nobel Peace Prize in 1937. He was presented with honorary degrees by the Universities of Edinburgh, Oxford, Cambridge, Manchester, Liverpool, St Andrews, Aberdeen, Princeton, Columbia, and Athens.

Cecil died on 24 November 1958 at his home at Chelwood Gate, Danehill near Haywards Heath. He left no heirs and his Viscountcy became extinct.

== Legacy ==
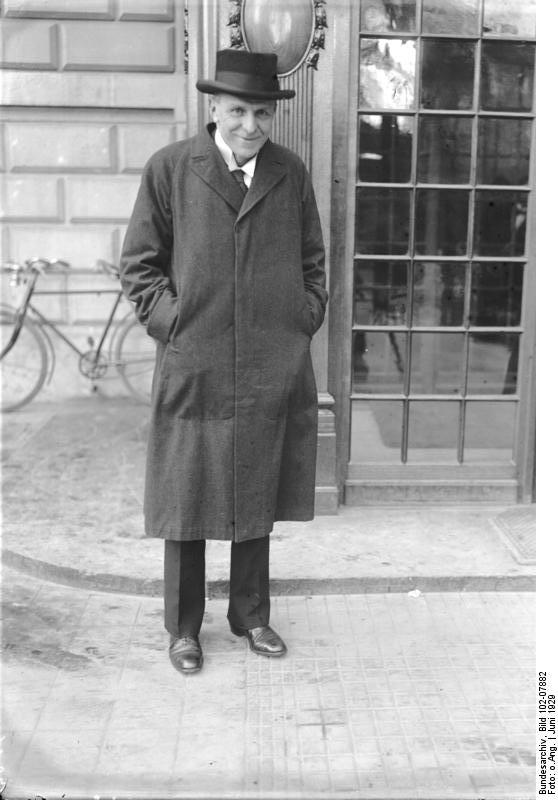
Lord Cecil of Chelwood, 1929.

Lord Home paid tribute to Cecil in the House of Lords two days after his death:

He was one of the first people, perhaps, in the modern world...to foresee the absolute need for nations to meet round the table in discussion of their national affairs in the interests of peace. He was one of the architects of the League of Nations. And your Lordships will recall the unflagging enthusiasm with which he pursued the cause of peace wherever he went. His vision of a world disarmed, where conciliation would hold the day, was time and again disappointed...all since have been convinced of the rightness of his ideal, although the world has not proved itself yet great enough to match his great conception. In the United Nations, which was the successor of the League of Nations, there is many a living monument to Lord Cecil. Many of the committees which do great work in the international field were the result of his conception and are daily drawing people closer and closer together in interdependence. I, myself, because my father was very keen and with him did much in the League of Nations field, remember Lord Robert Cecil coming to stay at home; and many a time at dinner, when I was a comparatively young man, I would watch him, with his long figure, slide more and more under the table, until only the distinguished head was left above his plate, and he would tell us of all his plans for the future peace of the world. Ever since then I have felt that so long as he was alive there was one among us who, however bitter the strife and however blind the world, never despaired of finding peace in our time.

Viscount Alexander of Hillsborough said that Cecil "impressed me by his complete devotion to the cause which ought to be, if it is not, the main cause in all our lives—to try to secure peace and to establish the brotherhood of man...I am sure that the whole nation mourns the loss of a great public figure, to whom and to whose work we are all greatly indebted". Clement Attlee also paid tribute: "I think the whole world has lost a very great man and a very great friend. Wherever the cause of peace is mentioned, the name of Lord Cecil will always come up, and the complete devotion that he gave to that cause for so many years". Lord Pethick-Lawrence said of Cecil that his "life was devoted not to self, not to his own aggrandisement or some advantage of a personal kind, but to the well-being of his fellow human beings and the good fortune of this country and the whole world".

Salvador de Madariaga summed up Cecil's character:

The gaunt, stooping, clerical figure of Robert Cecil seemed ever drawn forward by an eager zest which one fancied sharpened his long pointed nose and flashed in his powerful eye (only one: in Cecil the other eye did not matter). That cross hanging from his waistcoat pocket witnessed to the religious basis of his political faiths; but the sharp tongue, the determined chin, the large, powerful hand, the air of a man used to be obeyed, proud towards men if humble before God, did suggest that in that tall figure striding with his long legs the thronged corridors of the League, the levels of Christian charity were kept high above the plane of fools.

== Works ==
- 'Lord Salisbury', Monthly Review, xiii, October 1903
- Our National Church (1913)
- The Way of Peace (1928)
- A Letter to an M.P. on Disarmament (1931)
- 'The League as a Road to Peace', in L. Woolf (ed.), The Intelligent Man's Way to Avoid War (London: Victor Gollancz, 1933), pp. 256–313
- A Great Experiment (1941)
- All the Way (1949)

== Notes ==
Parliament of the United Kingdom
Preceded by Edmund Boulnois	Member of Parliament for Marylebone East; 1906 – 1910	Succeeded by James Boyton
Preceded by Alfred Peter Hillier	Member of Parliament for Hitchin; 1911 – 1923	Succeeded by Guy Molesworth Kindersley
Political offices
Preceded by Hon. Neil Primrose	Under-Secretary of State for Foreign Affairs; 1916–1919	Succeeded by Cecil Harmsworth
Preceded by New office	Minister of Blockade; 1916–1918	Succeeded by Sir Laming Worthington-Evans, Bt
Preceded by Austen Chamberlain	Lord Privy Seal; 1923–1924	Succeeded by J. R. Clynes
Preceded by Josiah Wedgwood	Chancellor of the Duchy of Lancaster; 1924–1927	Succeeded by The Lord Cushendun
Academic offices
Preceded by Joseph Chamberlain	Chancellor of the University of Birmingham; 1918–1944	Succeeded by Anthony Eden
Preceded by Robert Horne	Rector of the University of Aberdeen; 1924–1927	Succeeded by The Earl of Birkenhead
Peerage of the United Kingdom
New creation	Viscount Cecil of Chelwood; 1923–1958	Extinct
