= 1923 Draft Treaty of Mutual Assistance =

Unsuccessful proposal of disarmament and security in Europa after WWI

The 1923 Draft Treaty of Mutual Assistance was an unsuccessful proposal made by the League of Nations to address the issue of disarmament and security in Europe after World War I. It was rejected by the British government in 1924 and was never adopted.

The Draft Treaty was an early attempt by the League of Nations to create a system of collective security and disarmament, but it was ultimately rejected by key member states, leading the League to pursue alternative approaches that also ultimately failed to gain traction.

== History ==
Disarmament was a high priority for the League, after the terrible experience of World War I. A leading British diplomat Lord Robert Cecil helped prepare the proposal for the League's Temporary Mixed Commission for Disarmament (TMC).

Nevertheless, it proved impossible to come up with a way to enforce disarmament. The dilemma was that if almost everyone was disarmed, the remaining armed power would be very dangerous. In the context of Europe in the 1920s, the specific fear was that Germany could quickly rearm and threaten the neighbour, and the disarmed members of the League would be helpless to stop it. Lord Cecil (at the time a delegate from South Africa) proposed a solution in 1922 called the "Treaty of Mutual Guarantee". Every country that signed, and had reduced its armaments according to the agreed schedule, would be protected. If anyone attacked it, the Treaty would guarantee that the victim would be immediately supported by all the other signatories. France and Britain, although quarrelling on many other issues, at first supported the proposal. As the other nations debated the proposal, confusion and difficulty arose – some governments said the proposal went too far, others said it did not go far enough, and few were actually satisfied with it. Latin American states ignored the issue as did the United States (which never joined the League.). The report of the Permanent Elements Commission, representing military leaders, said such a treaty would never work. Finally, in September 1923 a French draft retitled the "Treaty of Mutual Assistance" was supported by the majority, with a large dissenting minority. At the time Italy and Greece were at swords' points, so the proposed treaty was not just a hypothetical solution to imaginary problems. Lord Cecil, now a member of the British government, built up support. The new version would empower the Consul to designate an aggressor, apply economic sanctions, mobilize military forces, and supervise their action.

In 1924 the new British Labour government under Ramsay MacDonald reversed course and opposed the treaty, with support from Canada. The fear was that it would weaken the newly formed British Commonwealth of Nations by diverting military strength. Canada also feared it would be obliged to declare war on the United States. The proposal was now dead.

== Contents ==
The key points were:

- It proposed to make war of aggression illegal,
- and if a country was attacked, all League members would send troops to defend the victim.

The goal was to provide security assurances that would allow countries to disarm, as many were reluctant to disarm without guarantees of protection. The draft treaty was discussed at the League Assembly in September 1923, but was ultimately rejected, primarily due to objections from Great Britain, which feared committing troops that it wanted to keep in reserve to defend the British Empire.

== Alternatives ==
The failure of the Draft Treaty of Mutual Assistance led the League to try a different approach in 1924 with the Geneva Protocol. It aimed to tie together security, disarmament, and compulsory arbitration of disputes. However, the Geneva Protocol also failed to gain acceptance.

== See also ==
- Disarmament
- United Kingdom and the League of Nations#Treaty of Mutual Guarantee
- Locarno Treaties
- International relations (1919–1939)
