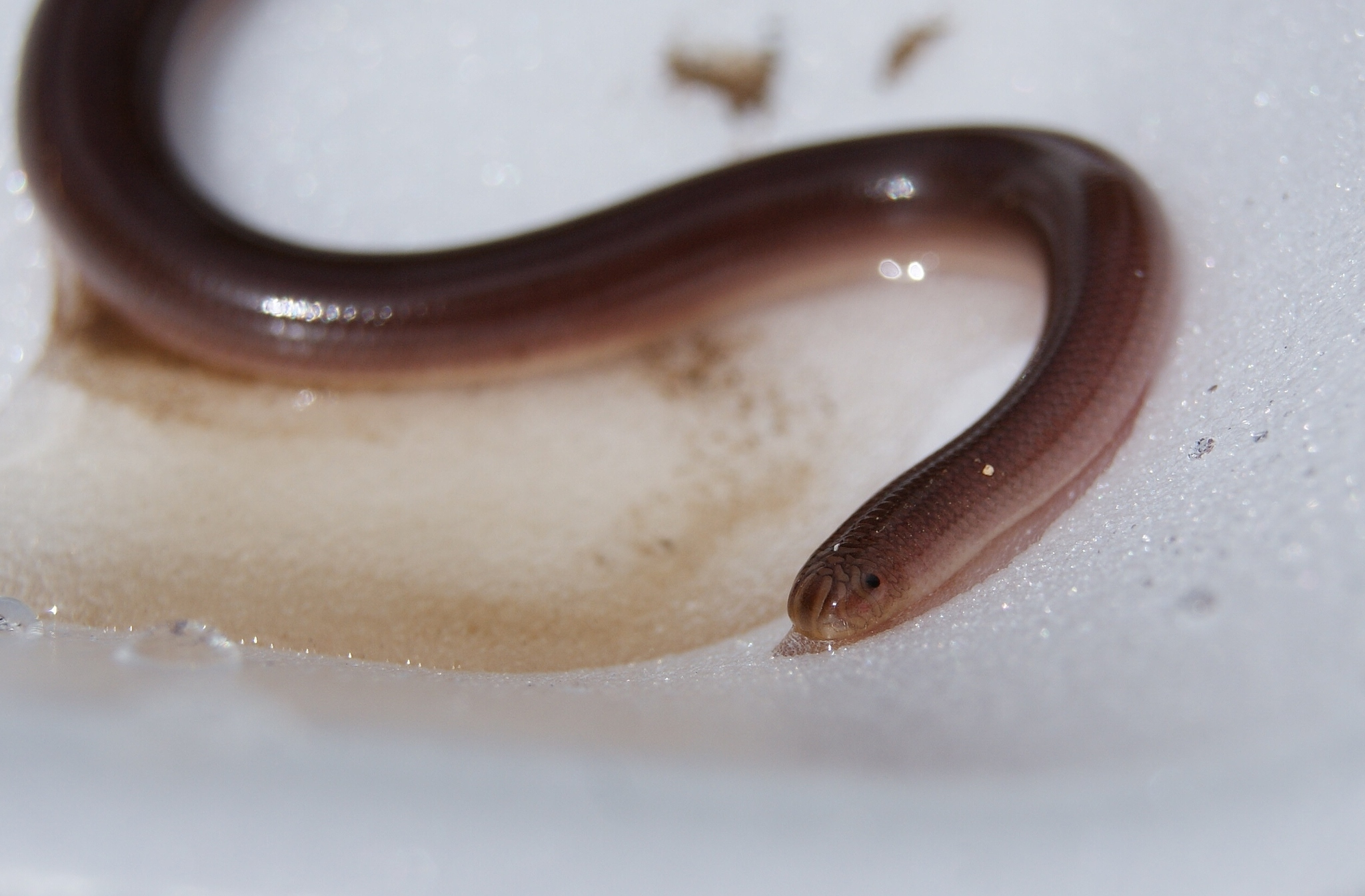
- Levantine blindsnake caught in a glue trap, Ramallah

Scientific classification
- Kingdom: Animalia
- Phylum: Chordata
- Class: Reptilia
- Order: Squamata
- Suborder: Serpentes
- Family: Typhlopidae
- Genus: Xerotyphlops
- Species: X. syriacus

Binomial name
- Xerotyphlops syriacus (Jan, 1864)

= Xerotyphlops syriacus =

Species of snake

Xerotyphlops syriacus, also known as the Syrian blind snake, or the Levantine blindsnake. is a species of nonvenomous snake in the genus Xerotyphlops. This species can be found in Lebanon, Syria, Jordan, the State of Palestine, Egypt, and Israel. This snake is an insectivore and its diet consists of small ants and ant larvae. Xerotyphlops syriacus is a fossorial snake.
