= 1911 Hitchin by-election =

UK parliamentary by-election

← Dec. 1910	23 November 1911	1918 →

Candidate	Cecil	Greg
Party	Conservative	Liberal
Popular vote	5,542	3,909
Percentage	58.6%	41.4%
MP before election
Alfred Peter Hillier
Conservative
Subsequent MP
Lord Robert Cecil
Unionist

The 1911 Hitchin by-election was a Parliamentary by-election held on 23 November 1911. The constituency returned one Member of Parliament (MP) to the House of Commons of the United Kingdom, elected by the first past the post voting system.

== Vacancy ==
Dr Alfred Peter Hillier had been the Conservative MP for Hitchin since regaining the seat from the Liberals in January 1910. He committed suicide on 24 October 1911 in his home at 20 Eccleston Square, London, England.

== Electoral history ==
General election December 1910: Hitchin
Party	Candidate	Votes	%	±%
Conservative	Alfred Peter Hillier	5,233	57.0	−2.8
Liberal	Thomas Tylston Greg	3,942	43.0	+2.8
Majority		1,291	14.0	−5.6
Turnout		9,175	84.3	−4.2
Conservative hold		Swing	-2.8	

== Candidates ==
The new Conservative candidate was Robert Cecil who had been Conservative MP for Marylebone East until January 1910. In 1910 he unsuccessfully contested Blackburn in the January election and Wisbech in the December election. Thomas Tylston Greg, who had been the Liberal candidate last time was again chosen to contest the seat.

== Result ==
The Conservative Party held the seat with an increased majority.

Hitchin by-election, 1911
Party	Candidate	Votes	%	±%
Conservative	Robert Cecil	5,542	58.6	+1.6
Liberal	Thomas Tylston Greg	3,909	41.4	−1.6
Majority		1,633	17.2	+3.2
Turnout		9,451	84.8	+0.5
Conservative hold		Swing	+1.6	

== Aftermath ==
A General Election was due to take place by the end of 1915. By the autumn of 1914, the following candidates had been adopted to contest that election. Due to the outbreak of war, the election never took place.

- Unionist: Robert Cecil
- Liberal:

General election 14 December 1918: Hitchin
Party		Candidate	Votes	%	±%
C	Unionist	Robert Cecil	9,828	60.6	+2.0
	Labour	Robert Green	5,661	34.9	New
	NFDDSS	George Humm	722	4.5	New
Majority			4,167	25.7	+8.5
Turnout			16,211	54.4	−30.4
Registered electors			29,820		
	Unionist hold		Swing		
C indicates candidate endorsed by the coalition government.
