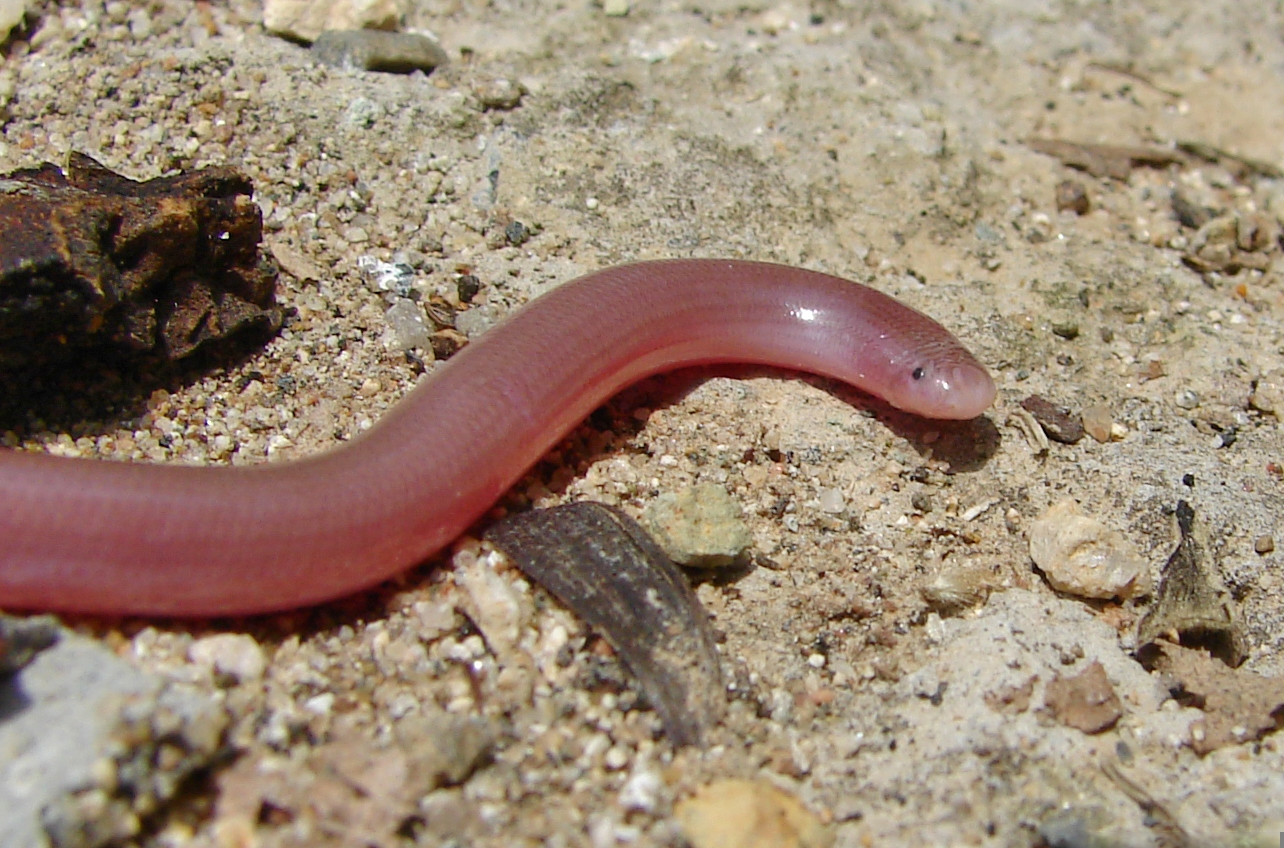

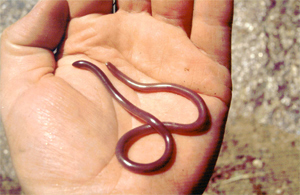

Conservation status
- Least Concern (IUCN 3.1)

Scientific classification
- Kingdom: Animalia
- Phylum: Chordata
- Class: Reptilia
- Order: Squamata
- Suborder: Serpentes
- Family: Typhlopidae
- Genus: Xerotyphlops
- Species: X. vermicularis

Binomial name
- Xerotyphlops vermicularis Merrem, 1820

Synonyms
- Typhlops vermicularis; Typhlops flavescens; Argyrophis vermicularis; Typhlops syriacus; Typhlops persicus

= Xerotyphlops vermicularis =

Species of snake

Xerotyphlops vermicularis, the European blind snake, European worm snake, Eurasian blind snake, or Eurasian worm snake, is a non-venomous species of snake in the genus Xerotyphlops. The common name results from the fact that is the only blindsnake naturally found in Europe (the brahminy blindsnake, Indotyphlops braminus, has been introduced to Kew Gardens and in Italy and Spain).

== Description ==
Xerotyphlops vermicularis is a small, earthworm-like snake that has a maximum length of 35 cm. The head, body, and tail generally have no differentiation between them and look like one fluid segment. The coloration tends to be light brown, yellowish, or flesh colored. Juveniles do not usually have different coloring than the adults, but some have been known to look pinkish when they are smaller. It is difficult to tell male and female European blind snakes apart; however, males will generally have longer tails than the females.

== Reproduction ==
=== Courtship ===
X. vermicularis is generally found underneath rocks in groups when mating season is beginning. Their mating behavior typically follows a three-step process:

- Tactile-chase: males first contact with female; involves chemosensory sampling as well as rubbing and biting the female.
- Tactile-alignment: males initial attempt at copulation; tactile-chase behaviors can also occur at the same time; male attempts to align tail with the females.
- Intromission Coitus: females open their cloaca and allow males to insert their hemipenes.

Due to the size of these snakes, the beginning and end of each phase is difficult to differentiate.

=== Copulation ===
This process takes place during the months of May and June and egg laying takes place between July and August. The male is wrapped around the mid-section of the female with their cloacae pressed closely together. They stay connected like that for roughly 1-2 minutes and afterwards the male disconnects himself from the female and moves away.

== Ecology and distribution ==
Despite its common name, the range of the European blind snake ranges from the Balkan Peninsula, the Aegean Islands, and Cyprus to Afghanistan. The northernmost region it inhabits is just north of the Gulf of Burgas in Bulgaria.

Like other members of the genus, Xerotyphlops vermicularis are burrowers. A survey of nesting boxes in Turkey discovered that the Eurasian scops owls tend to bring live Xerotyphlops vermicularis to the nests soon after hatching of the brood. The snakes then feed on insects inside the nest including ectoparasites, commensals and kleptoparasites. This is in turn associated with greater survival of the nestlings.

== See also ==
- List of typhlopid species and subspecies
- A-Z Animals
