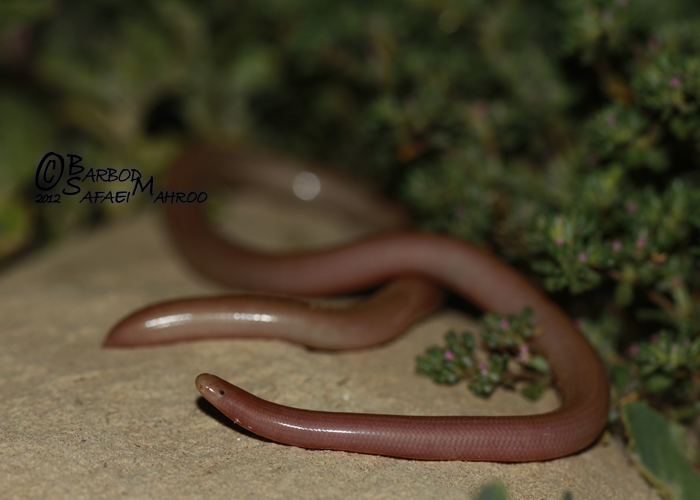

Conservation status
- Data Deficient (IUCN 3.1)

Scientific classification
- Kingdom: Animalia
- Phylum: Chordata
- Class: Reptilia
- Order: Squamata
- Suborder: Serpentes
- Family: Typhlopidae
- Genus: Xerotyphlops
- Species: X. wilsoni

Binomial name
- Xerotyphlops wilsoni (Wall, 1908)

Synonyms
- Typhlops wilsoni Wall, 1908; Xerotyphlops wilsoni — Hedges et al., 2014

= Iranian worm snake =

Species of snake

The Iranian worm snake (Xerotyphlops wilsoni) is a species of snake in the family Typhlopidae. The species is endemic to Iran.

== Etymology ==
The specific name, wilsoni, is in honor of Arnold Talbot Wilson, who was a British military officer, diplomat, and amateur naturalist.

== Reproduction ==
X. wilsoni is oviparous.
