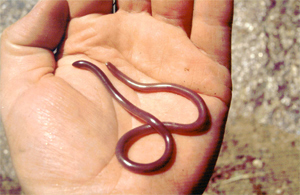
- Xerotyphlops vermicularis

Scientific classification
- Kingdom: Animalia
- Phylum: Chordata
- Class: Reptilia
- Order: Squamata
- Suborder: Serpentes
- Family: Typhlopidae
- Genus: Xerotyphlops; Hedges, Marion, Lipp, Marin & Vidal, 2014

= Xerotyphlops =

Genus of snakes

Xerotyphlops is a genus of snakes in the family Typhlopidae.

== Distribution ==
The five species in this genus Xerotyphlops are found in the Palearctic.

== Species ==
The following species are recognized as being valid.

- Xerotyphlops etheridgei (Wallach, 2002)
- Xerotyphlops luristanicus Torki, 2017
- Xerotyphlops socotranus (Boulenger, 1889)
- Xerotyphlops syriacus (Jan, 1864)
- Xerotyphlops vermicularis (Merrem, 1820)
- Xerotyphlops wilsoni (Wall, 1908)

Nota bene. A binomial authority in parentheses indicates that the species was originally described in a genus other than Xerotyphlops.
