= Socotra worm snake =

Scientific classification
- Kingdom: Animalia
- Phylum: Chordata
- Class: Reptilia
- Order: Squamata
- Suborder: Serpentes
- Family: Typhlopidae
- Genus: Xerotyphlops
- Species: X. socotranus

Binomial name
- Xerotyphlops socotranus (Boulenger, 1889)

Synonyms
- Typhlops socotranus

Species of snake

The Socotra worm snake (Xerotyphlops socotranus) is a species of snake in the Typhlopidae family. It is found only on the island of Socotra in Yemen.

== First description ==
- George Albert Boulenger, 1889 : Descriptions of new Typhlopidæ in the British Museum. Annals and Magazine of Natural History, ser. 6, vol. 4, p. 360-363 (read online).
