= Arnold Wilson =

British diplomat (1884–1940)

Sir Arnold Wilson KCIE CSI CMG DSO MP
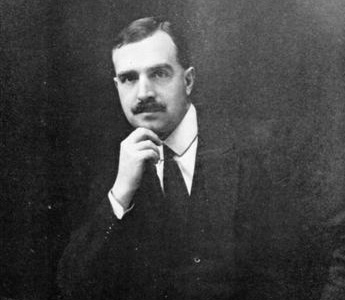
- Sir Arnold Wilson

Member of Parliament for Hitchin
- In office 1933–1940
- Preceded by: Viscount Knebworth
- Succeeded by: Seymour Berry

Personal details
- Born: 18 July 1884 United Kingdom
- Died: 31 May 1940 (aged 55) Near Eringhem, France
- Party: Conservative
- Parent: James Wilson (father)
- Relatives: Mona Wilson (half-sister); Sir Steuart Wilson (brother)
- Education: Clifton College
- Military career
- Allegiance: United Kingdom
- Branch: British Army; British Indian Army; Royal Air Force
- Service years: 1903–1921 (Army); 1939–1940 (Air Force)
- Rank: Lieutenant colonel (Army); Pilot officer (Air Force)
- Units: 32nd Sikh Pioneers; No. 37 Squadron RAF
- Conflicts: First World War; Middle Eastern theatre; Iraqi revolt of 1920; Second World War; Western Front; French and Low Countries campaign; Battle of France; Battle of Dunkirk †
- Awards: DSO

Sir Arnold Talbot Wilson KCIE CSI CMG DSO (18 July 1884 – 31 May 1940) was a British soldier, colonial administrator, Conservative politician, writer and editor. Wilson served under Percy Cox, the colonial administrator of Mesopotamia (Mandatory Iraq) during and after First World War, including an Iraqi revolt in 1920. On 31 May 1940 he was reported as missing, presumed killed, while serving as an aircrew member at the advanced age of 55.

In the 1930s, Wilson drew controversy for expressing support for Francisco Franco and sympathy for Nazi Germany, albeit he privately expressed disgust after visiting a concentration camp in 1936. During the war, he volunteered to fight, saying "I have no desire to shelter myself and live in safety behind the ramparts of the bodies of millions of our young men."

== Early life and career ==
Wilson was born in 1884 and educated in England at Clifton College, where his father James Wilson was a headmaster. His elder half-sister was the leading civil servant Mona Wilson and his younger brother was the tenor Sir Steuart Wilson. His middle brother, Hugh Stanley Wilson, a master at Rugby School, was killed at Hebuterne in September 1915 in an action in which Charles Pawsey - of Kohima fame - gained his first MC.

Wilson (aka "A.T.") was tall and strong. He began his military career as an army officer on 19 August 1903, having been awarded the King's Medal and sword of honour at the Royal Military Academy Sandhurst, being commissioned on the Unattached List for the British Indian Army. After he spent a year attached to the 1st battalion the Wiltshire Regiment in India, he was appointed to the Bengal Lancers and posted to the 32nd Sikh Pioneers, on 18 December 1904.

Wilson famously saved money travelling back to Britain on leave by working as a stoker to Marseille and then cycling the rest of the way.

In 1904 he went to Iran as a lieutenant to lead a group of Bengal Lancers to guard the British consulate in Ahvaz and to protect the work of the D'Arcy Oil Company, which had obtained a sixty-year oil concession in Iran and was pursuing oil exploration in partnership with the Burmah Oil Company.

In 1907 Wilson was transferred to the Indian Political Department and sent to the Persian Gulf, where he served as a political officer. Wilson oversaw the discovery of the first oil site in the Middle East, Masjid-i-Suleiman in 1908. While serving as a senior administrator and consul-general of Muhammerah (1909–11), he was put in charge of the Turko-Persian Frontier Commission. He looked like the traditional figure of the Indian Rebellion of 1857 in a top buttoned bright red tunic, the British Indian Army uniform. "His flashing eyes, his beetling eyebrows, his close-cropped hair, his biblical quotations", recalled Gertrude Bell, the British "Oriental Secretary". Wilson was a hard worker, a workaholic, who was tirelessly energetic, shifting mountains of paperwork. He inspired a younger colleague, Harry Philby, while Hubert Young, a favoured subordinate, found him domineering.

== First World War ==
In January 1915, as the British were moving troops from India into Mesopotamia through the Persian Gulf and Basra, Wilson was designated as the assistant, and then deputy, to Sir Percy Cox, the British political officer for the region. Based in Baghdad, he then became the acting civil commissioner for Mesopotamia. The problem remained that there was no official "Arab Policy"; it had not been defined in law nor by the Civil Service. India wanted Mesopotamia as a province; but Arabists from Cox downwards wished for a semi-autonomous policy separate from the Arab Bureau in Cairo. Policy was made ad hoc; but Wilson disagreed.

During his tenure in Mesopotamia Wilson worked to improve the country's administration according to the principles he learned in India. In Wilson's view the priority was to reconstruct and stabilise the country, by establishing an efficient government and administration as well as a fair treatment and political representation of the various ethnic and religious communities (i.e. in the case of Iraq: Arabs, Kurds, Turkmen, of religions such as Islam Shiite and Sunni, Christianity and Judaism). In doing so, he was nicknamed "The Despot of Mess-Pot".

Capt Wilson told me the staggering news that he had been appointed to Tehran ... Capt Wilson and I are excellent colleagues and the best of friends and I know I can do a good deal by seeing people ... I am going to compile an intelligence book on Persia.

However, after the First World War he found himself progressively opposed to other British officials who believed that Arab countries should be granted independence under British supervision. British policymakers debated two alternative approaches to Middle Eastern issues. Many diplomats adopted the line of thought of T. E. Lawrence favouring Arab national ideals. They backed the Hashemite family for top leadership positions. Wilson expressed the views of the India office. They argued that direct British rule was essential, and the Hashemite family was too supportive of policies that would interfere with British interests. The decision was to support Arab nationalism, sidetracked Wilson, and consolidate power in the Colonial Office.

== After the First World War ==
In 1918, Wilson became acting civil commissioner over the territory that would become known as Iraq. In 1919, during the Paris Peace Conference, he was among the few who successfully recommended adopting the Arabic name Iraq, as it had been known for more than 1400 years by Muslim and Arab worlds, instead of the Greek name Mesopotamia which was only used by Westerners. This political entity covered the planned northern expansion of the newly created country under the British Mandate to include the oil rich Mosul region of northern Iraq, in addition to the Mesopotamian provinces of Baghdad and Basra.

In April 1920, at the Conference of San Remo, the League of Nations agreed to the British mandate over Iraq. In the spring and summer of 1920, a revolt against the Mandate erupted across central and southern Iraq. Wilson, as part of the Mandatory administration, took a direct role in suppressing the revolt.

Having achieved the rank of brevet lieutenant-colonel in August 1918, he retired from the Indian Army in August 1921.

In the summer of 1920 Wilson proposed a compromise, suggesting that Feisal, the former king of Syria, be offered the Iraqi throne. This proposal was intended to obtain support from the Iraqis as well as British officials who favoured semi-independence. It was eventually accepted by the British government, but Wilson was not there to participate in its implementation. The British government decided not to follow Wilson's views, and instead granted independence to Iraq. The British government removed Wilson from his position in Iraq and knighted him. Deeply disappointed by the turn of events, he left the public service and joined the Anglo-Persian Oil Company as manager of their Middle Eastern operations. He worked for the company until 1932.

== Interwar decades ==
Across the 1930s Wilson undertook a great number of extracurricular activities, such as chairman of the Parliamentary Scientific Committee (forerunner of the Parliamentary and Scientific Committee), an active role in the British Science Guild, the British Eugenics Society, the Industrial Health Research Board, and many more.

Wilson was responsible for the large exhibition of Persian art at Burlington House in London in 1931.

Wilson published his travelling and political diaries as Thoughts and Talks, More Thoughts and Talks and Walks and Talks Abroad with the Right Book Club. In addition to his writing, Wilson served as editor of The Nineteenth Century and After between 1934 and 1938.

== Politics ==
In 1933 Wilson was elected in a by-election as the Conservative MP for Hitchin. He described himself as a "left-wing radical Tory".

Like his half-sister Mona Wilson, Wilson published extensively on what he termed "left wing" issues such as workmen's compensation, the costs of funerals, industrial assurance, and old age pensions. These researches arguably influenced related postwar policies.

Before the Second World War his outspoken views on foreign policy evoked much criticism. In 1938 Wilson expressed support for the Spanish Nationalists, saying "I hope to God Franco wins in Spain, and the sooner the better." After the beginning of the war, he made a speech at the 1922 Committee demanding a negotiated settlement with Nazi Germany. In the 1930s, Wilson had traveled to Germany several times, and expressed admiration for their achievements. He prophesied that Hitler would become "a venerable and revered figure". However, he defended Jews in conversations with German friends, and expressed disgust over Dachau concentration camp, which he visited in 1936. Although camp officials had attempted to conceal the abuses which were occurring, Wilson said "there was in the atmosphere of the camp something against which my soul revolted." He said he saw "fear, haunting fear," in the eyes of the prisoners.

George Orwell called Wilson a Fascist, but he praised his courage and patriotism.

== Second World War ==
However, in October 1939 after the outbreak of the war, he joined the Royal Air Force Volunteer Reserve, serving as a air gunner in 37 Squadron of RAF Bomber Command holding the rank of Pilot Officer. He stated that "I have no desire to shelter myself and live in safety behind the ramparts of the bodies of millions of our young men." Still an MP, he was killed in northern France, near Dunkirk, on 31 May 1940 when the bomber he was serving on as an air gunner, Wellington L7791, piloted by Pilot Officer William Gray crashed near Eringhem, killing him instantly and fatally wounding Gray. He is buried at Eringhem churchyard, half-way between Dunkirk and Saint-Omer.

== Legacy ==
Wilson was immortalised as Sir George Corbett in the 1942 Powell and Pressburger movie One of Our Aircraft is Missing.

His book The Persian Gulf was published in 1928. S.W. Persia: Letters and Diary of a Young Political Officer 1907–1914 was published posthumously in 1941.

Arnold Wilson is commemorated in the scientific names of two species of reptiles: Panaspis wilsoni and Xerotyphlops wilsoni.

Sir Arnold's personal papers are held at the London Library, London, UK.

== See also ==
- Iraqi revolt of 1920

Parliament of the United Kingdom
Preceded by Viscount Knebworth	Member of Parliament for Hitchin; 1933–1940	Succeeded by Seymour Berry
