= Hitchin (constituency) =

UK Parliament constituency (1885–1983, 2024 onwards)

Coordinates: 51.95°N 0.28°W

- County constituency for the House of Commons
- Interactive map of boundaries since 2024
- Location within the East of England
- County: Hertfordshire
- Electorate: 72,112 (March 2020)
- Major settlements: Hitchin, Shefford, Stotfold, Arlesey

Current constituency
- Created: 2024
- Member of Parliament: Alistair Strathern (Labour)
- Seats: One
- Created from: Hitchin and Harpenden, Mid Bedfordshire (part)

1885–1983
- Seats: One
- Created from: Hertfordshire
- Replaced by: North Hertfordshire, Stevenage
- During its existence contributed to new seat(s) of: Hertford and Stevenage

Hitchin was a parliamentary constituency in Hertfordshire which returned one Member of Parliament (MP) to the House of Commons of the Parliament of the United Kingdom from 1885 until it was abolished for the 1983 general election.

Further to the completion of the 2023 review of Westminster constituencies, it was re-established as a cross-county boundary seat in Hertfordshire and Bedfordshire for the 2024 general election, since when it has been held by Alistair Strathern of the Labour Party. Strathern had served as the MP for Mid Bedfordshire since a by-election in October 2023, but chose to stand in Hitchin, which included a small part of Mid Bedfordshire following boundary changes.

== Constituency profile ==
The Hitchin constituency is located mostly in Hertfordshire and partly in Bedfordshire. It is centred around its largest town, Hitchin, which has a population of around 35,000. Other settlements in the constituency include the Stevenage suburb of Great Ashby, the small towns of Shefford, Stotfold and Arlesey and the villages of Langford and Clifton. The constituency also contains communities based around the military sites of MOD Chicksands and RAF Henlow. Hitchin is traditionally an agricultural market town and is connected to London and Cambridge by rail. The constituency is affluent with low levels of deprivation. House prices are higher than the national average.

Residents of the constituency have high levels of education and income. A high proportion of residents work in the construction and defence industries. White people made up 88% of the population at the 2021 census. At the local council level, Hitchin is represented by Labour Party and Liberal Democrat councillors, whilst the rest of the constituency elected mostly Conservative councillors. An estimated 53% of voters in the constituency supported remaining in the European Union in the 2016 referendum, higher than the nationwide figure of 48%.

== Boundaries and boundary changes ==
=== Historic ===
==== 1885–1918 ====
- The Sessional Divisions of Aldbury (except the parishes of Great Hadham and Little Hadham), Buntingford, Hitchin, Odsey, Stevenage, and Welwyn; and
- The parish of Braughing.

The constituency was established by the Redistribution of Seats Act 1885 (which followed on from the Third Reform Act) as one of four Divisions of the abolished three-member Parliamentary County of Hertfordshire, and was formally named as the Northern or Hitchin Division of Hertfordshire. It included the towns/villages of Hitchin, Stevenage, Welwyn, Baldock and Royston.

==== 1918–1945 ====
- The Urban Districts of Baldock, Hitchin, Royston, and Stevenage;
- The Rural Districts of Ashwell, Buntingford, Hitchin, and Welwyn; and
- The Rural District of Hertford parishes of Aston, Bennington, Datchworth, Sacombe, Walkern, and Watton-at-Stone.

Minor changes only to reflect local authority boundaries.

==== 1945–1950 ====
- The Urban Districts of Baldock, Hitchin, Letchworth, Royston, and Stevenage;
- The Rural Districts of Hitchin, and Welwyn; and
- Parts of the Rural Districts of Braughing and Hertford.

The constituency had included a part of the Urban District of Welwyn Garden City, which had been formed as a separate local authority in 1927, and this was now transferred to St Albans. Other nominal changes as a result of the reorganisation of local authorities.

==== 1950–1955 ====
- The Urban Districts of Baldock, Hitchin, Letchworth, Royston, and Stevenage;
- The Rural District of Hitchin;
- The Rural District of Braughing parishes of Anstey, Ardeley, Aspenden, Broadfield, Buckland, Buntingford, Cottered, Hormead, Meesden, Throcking, Westmilll, and Wyddiall; and
- The Rural District of Hertford parishes of Aston, Bennington, Datchworth, Sacombe, Walkern, and Watton-at-Stone.

The Rural District of Welwyn was transferred to St Albans.

==== 1955–1974 ====
- The Urban Districts of Baldock, Hitchin, Letchworth, Royston, and Stevenage; and
- The Rural District of Hitchin.

The part of the Rural District of Braughing was transferred to the new constituency of East Hertfordshire, and the part of the Rural District of Hertford was transferred to Hertford.

==== 1974–1983 ====
- The Urban Districts of Baldock, Hitchin, Letchworth, and Royston; and
- The Rural District of Hitchin.

The Urban District of Stevenage formed the majority of the new County Constituency of Hertford and Stevenage.

The constituency was abolished for the 1983 general election and was replaced by the new constituency of North Hertfordshire, with the exception of a small part in the south-east which was included in the new constituency of Stevenage (Codicote and Knebworth).

=== Current ===
Further to the 2023 review of Westminster constituencies, which came into effect for the 2024 general election, the composition of the re-established constituency was defined as follows (as they existed on 1 December 2020):

- The District of Central Bedfordshire wards of Arlesey; Shefford; and Stotfold and Langford - transferred partly from North East Bedfordshire and partly from Mid Bedfordshire.
- The District of North Hertfordshire wards of: Cadwell; Chesfield; Hitchin Bearton; Hitchin Highbury; Hitchin Oughton; Hitchin Priory; Hitchin Walsworth; Hitchwood, Offa and Hoo; and Kimpton - transferred from the abolished constituency of Hitchin and Harpenden.

Following local government boundary reviews in Central Bedfordshire and North Hertfordshire which came into effect in May 2023 and May 2024 respectively, the constituency now comprises the following from the 2024 general election:

- The District of Central Bedfordshire wards or part wards of: Arlesey & Fairfield; Clifton, Henlow & Langfield; Meppershall & Shillington (Meppershall parish); Shefford; Stotfold.
- The District of North Hertfordshire wards or part wards of: Cadwell; Codicote & Kimpton (Kimpton parish); Graveley, St Ippolyts & Wymondley; Great Ashby; Hitchin Bearton; Hitchin Highbury; Hitchin Oughton; Hitchin Priory; Hitchin Walsworth; Hitchwood; Offa.

== Members of Parliament ==
=== MPs 1885-1983 ===
North Hertfordshire and Stevenage prior to 1885

Election	Member	Party	Notes
1885	Baron Robert Dimsdale^{a}	Conservative	Member for Hertford (1866–1874)
1892	George Hudson	Conservative	
1906	Julius Bertram	Liberal	
January 1910	Alfred Hillier	Conservative	Died October 1911
1911 by-election	Lord Robert Cecil^{b}	Conservative	Member for Marylebone East (1906–1910)
1923	Guy Kindersley	Conservative	
1931	Viscount Knebworth	Conservative	Died May 1933
1933 by-election	Arnold Wilson	Conservative	Died May 1940
1941 by-election	Seymour Berry	Conservative	
1945	Philip Asterley Jones	Labour	
1950	Nigel Fisher	Conservative	Contested Surbiton following redistribution
1955	Martin Maddan	Conservative	
1964	Shirley Williams	Labour	Contested Hertford and Stevenage following redistribution
February 1974	Ian Stewart	Conservative	Contested North Hertfordshire following redistribution
1983	Constituency abolished: see North Hertfordshire		

Notes:-

- ^{a} Dimsdale was a Baron of the Russian Empire.

=== MPs since 2024 ===
Hitchin & Harpenden prior to 2024

Election	Member	Party	Notes
2024	Alistair Strathern	Labour	Member for Mid Bedfordshire (2023–2024)

== Election results ==
=== Elections in the 2020s ===
General election 2024: Hitchin
Party	Candidate	Votes	%	±%
Labour	Alistair Strathern (Note: Served as MP for Mid Bedfordshire from 2023 to 2024)	23,067	44.8	+17.7
Conservative	Bim Afolami (Note: Served as MP for Hitchin and Harpenden from 2017 to 2024)	14,958	28.5	–18.5
Reform	Charles Bunker	6,760	12.9	N/A
Liberal Democrats	Chris Lucas	4,913	9.4	–14.3
Green	Will Lavin	2,631	5.0	+3.5
CPA	Sid Cordle	181	0.3	–0.2
Majority		8,109	15.4	N/A
Turnout		52,510	69.4	–5.6
Registered electors		75,877		
Labour gain from Conservative		Swing	▲18.1	

=== Elections in the 2010s ===
The Hitchin parliamentary constituency did not exist when the 2019 general election was held. The following is a projection of what the result of the 2019 general election might have looked like in the Hitchin parliamentary constituency if it had existed.

2019 notional result
Party	Vote	%
Conservative	25,419	47.0
Labour	14,155	26.2
Liberal Democrats	12,798	23.7
Others	871	1.6
Green	818	1.5
Turnout	54,061	75.0
Electorate	72,112	

=== Elections in the 1970s ===
General election 1979: Hitchin
Party	Candidate	Votes	%	±%
Conservative	Ian Stewart	33,169	52.5	+8.0
Labour	Denis O'Flynn	19,940	31.6	–7.5
Liberal	Eric Dix	8,224	13.0	–3.3
Ecology	Brian Goodale	911	1.4	New
National Front	Victor Logan	881	1.4	New
Majority		13,229	21.0	+15.5
Turnout		63,125	82.2	+2.6
Registered electors		76,807		
Conservative hold		Swing	+7.7	

General election October 1974: Hitchin
Party	Candidate	Votes	%	±%
Conservative	Ian Stewart	25,842	44.6	+0.5
Labour	Ann Mallalieu	22,656	39.1	+1.5
Liberal	Eric Dix	9,454	16.3	–1.2
Majority		3,186	5.5	–1.0
Turnout		57,952	79.6	–6.0
Registered electors		72,815		
Conservative hold		Swing	–0.5	

General election February 1974: Hitchin
Party	Candidate	Votes	%	±%
Conservative	Ian Stewart	27,222	44.1	–8.2
Labour	Ann Mallalieu	23,204	37.6	–2.7
Liberal	D Beavan	10,824	17.5	+10.2
Independent	P Bianchi	467	0.8	New
Majority		4,018	6.5	–5.5
Turnout		61,717	85.6	+8.9
Registered electors		72,126		
Conservative hold		Swing	–2.8	

1970 notional result
Party	Vote	%
Conservative	27,800	52.4
Labour	21,400	40.3
Liberal	3,900	7.3
Turnout	53,100	76.6
Electorate	69,283	

General election 1970: Hitchin
Party	Candidate	Votes	%	±%
Labour	Shirley Williams	40,932	48.53	
Conservative	Richard Luce	37,258	44.18	
Liberal	Thomas Willis	6,148	7.29	New
Majority		3,674	4.35	
Turnout		84,338	76.88	
Registered electors		109,704		
Labour hold		Swing		

=== Elections in the 1960s ===
General election 1966: Hitchin
Party	Candidate	Votes	%	±%
Labour	Shirley Williams	42,233	56.52	
Conservative	John Stokes	32,483	43.48	
Majority		9,750	13.04	
Turnout		74,716	65.54	
Registered electors		90,840		
Labour hold		Swing		

General election 1964: Hitchin
Party	Candidate	Votes	%	±%
Labour	Shirley Williams	34,034	45.84	
Conservative	Martin Maddan	30,649	41.28	
Liberal	Elma Dangerfield	9,564	12.88	
Majority		3,385	4.56	N/A
Turnout		74,247	84.54	
Registered electors		87,825		
Labour gain from Conservative		Swing		

=== Elections in the 1950s ===
General election 1959: Hitchin
Party	Candidate	Votes	%	±%
Conservative	Martin Maddan	30,193	46.82	
Labour	Peter Benenson	25,818	40.03	
Liberal	Robert Glenton	8,481	13.15	New
Majority		4,375	6.79	
Turnout		64,492	85.43	
Registered electors		75,493		
Conservative hold		Swing		

General election 1955: Hitchin
Party	Candidate	Votes	%	±%
Conservative	Martin Maddan	26,371	50.93	
Labour	Peter Benenson	25,406	49.07	
Majority		965	1.86	
Turnout		51,777	83.17	
Registered electors		62,258		
Conservative hold		Swing		

General election 1951: Hitchin
Party	Candidate	Votes	%	±%
Conservative	Nigel Fisher	27,719	52.64	
Labour	Peter Benenson	24,941	47.36	
Majority		2,778	5.28	
Turnout		52,660	84.98	
Registered electors		61,966		
Conservative hold		Swing		

General election 1950: Hitchin
Party	Candidate	Votes	%	±%
Conservative	Nigel Fisher	23,580	45.11	
Labour	Philip Jones	21,829	41.76	
Liberal	Frank Haigh	6,863	13.13	
Majority		1,751	3.35	N/A
Turnout		52,272	85.78	
Registered electors		60,936		
Conservative gain from Labour		Swing		

=== Elections in the 1940s ===
General election 1945: Hitchin
Party	Candidate	Votes	%	±%
Labour	Philip Jones	20,779	42.64	
Conservative	Seymour Berry	20,433	41.93	
Liberal	Thomas Darling	7,515	15.42	New
Majority		346	0.71	N/A
Turnout		48,727	72.44	
Registered electors		67,266		
Labour gain from Conservative		Swing		

Hitchin by-election, 1941
Party	Candidate	Votes	%	±%
Conservative	Seymour Berry	Unopposed	N/A	N/A
Registered electors				
Conservative hold				

General Election 1939–40: Another General Election was required to take place before the end of 1940. The political parties had been making preparations for an election to take place from 1939 and by the end of this year, the following candidates had been selected;

- Conservative: Arnold Wilson
- Labour: George Lindgren

=== Elections in the 1930s ===
General election 1935: Hitchin
Party	Candidate	Votes	%	±%
Conservative	Arnold Wilson	21,452	63.34	
Labour	George Lindgren	12,417	36.66	
Majority		9,035	26.68	
Turnout		33,869	66.44	
Registered electors		50,975		
Conservative hold		Swing		

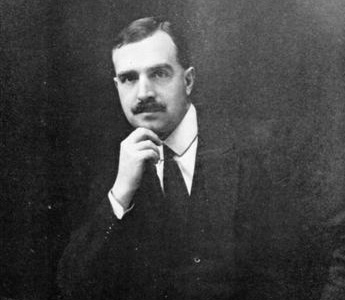
Arnold Wilson

Hitchin by-election, 1933
Party	Candidate	Votes	%	±%
Conservative	Arnold Wilson	14,569	58.4	−17.3
Labour	William Bennett	10,362	41.6	+17.3
Majority		4,207	16.8	−34.6
Turnout		24,931	51.3	−19.8
Registered electors		48,580		
Conservative hold		Swing	-17.3	

General election 1931: Hitchin
Party	Candidate	Votes	%	±%
Conservative	Viscount Knebworth	25,841	75.7	+30.9
Labour	Dermot Freyer	8,312	24.3	−2.6
Majority		17,529	51.4	+34.9
Turnout		34,153	71.1	−2.3
Registered electors		48,003		
Conservative hold		Swing		

=== Elections in the 1920s ===
General election 1929: Hitchin
Party	Candidate	Votes	%	±%
Unionist	Guy Kindersley	14,786	44.8	−14.4
Liberal	Enid Lapthorn	9,325	28.3	+11.9
Labour	Richard Gifford	8,880	26.9	+2.5
Majority		5,461	16.5	−18.3
Turnout		32,991	73.4	+3.9
Registered electors		44,967		
Unionist hold		Swing	−9.2	

General election 1924: Hitchin
Party	Candidate	Votes	%	±%
Unionist	Guy Kindersley	14,019	59.2	+9.5
Labour	Julian Athelstan Tayler	5,773	24.4	−1.9
Liberal	Dugald Macfadyen	3,881	16.4	−7.6
Majority		8,246	34.8	+11.4
Turnout		23,673	69.5	+1.8
Registered electors		34,060		
Unionist hold		Swing	+5.7	

General election 1923: Hitchin
Party	Candidate	Votes	%	±%
Unionist	Guy Kindersley	11,157	49.7	−12.3
Labour	Skene Mackay	5,913	26.3	−11.7
Liberal	Dugald Macfadyen	5,390	24.0	New
Majority		5,244	23.4	−0.6
Turnout		22,460	67.7	+1.5
Registered electors		33,197		
Unionist hold		Swing	−0.3	

General election 1922: Hitchin
Party	Candidate	Votes	%	±%
Unionist	Lord Robert Cecil	13,124	62.0	+1.4
Labour	Skene Mackay	8,049	38.0	+3.1
Majority		5,075	24.0	−1.7
Turnout		21,173	66.2	+7.8
Registered electors		32,005		
Unionist hold		Swing	−0.9	

=== Elections in the 1910s ===
General election 14 December 1918: Hitchin
Party		Candidate	Votes	%	±%
C	Unionist	Lord Robert Cecil	9,828	60.6	+3.6
	Labour	Robert Green	5,661	34.9	New
	NFDDSS	George Humm	722	4.5	New
Majority			4,167	25.7	+11.7
Turnout			16,211	54.4	−29.9
Registered electors			29,820		
	Unionist hold		Swing		
C indicates candidate endorsed by the coalition government.

General Election 1914–15:

Another General Election was required to take place before the end of 1915. The political parties had been making preparations for an election to take place and by the July 1914, the following candidates had been selected;

- Unionist: Lord Robert Cecil
- Liberal:

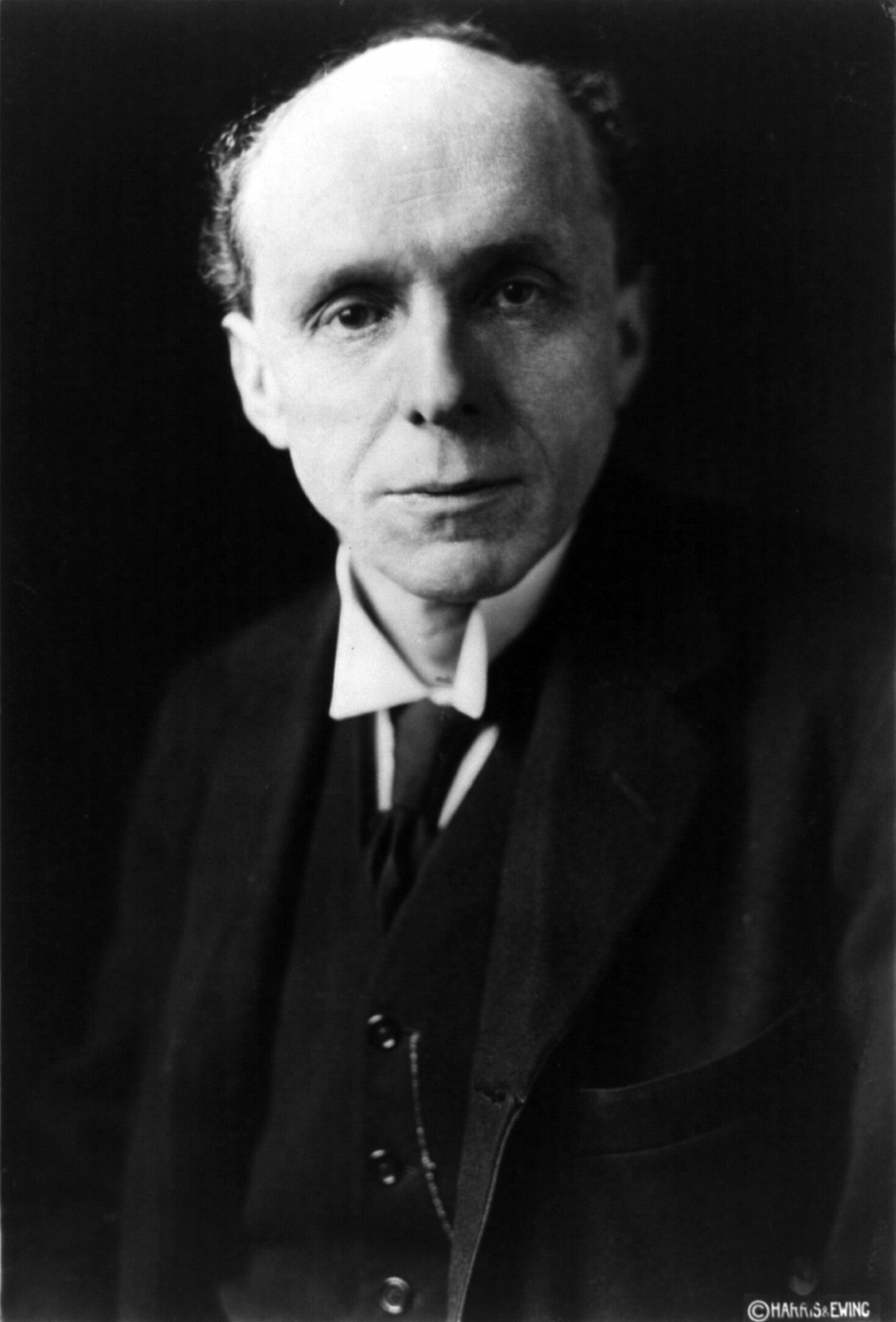
Robert Cecil

Hitchin by-election, 1911
Party	Candidate	Votes	%	±%
Conservative	Lord Robert Cecil	5,542	58.6	+1.6
Liberal	Thomas Tylston Greg	3,909	41.4	−1.6
Majority		1,633	17.2	+3.2
Turnout		9,451	84.8	+0.5
Registered electors				
Conservative hold		Swing	+1.6	

General election December 1910: Hitchin
Party	Candidate	Votes	%	±%
Conservative	Alfred Hillier	5,233	57.0	−2.8
Liberal	Thomas Tylston Greg	3,942	43.0	+2.8
Majority		1,291	14.0	−5.6
Turnout		9,175	84.3	−4.2
Registered electors				
Conservative hold		Swing	−2.8	

General election January 1910: Hitchin
Party	Candidate	Votes	%	±%
Conservative	Alfred Hillier	5,761	59.8	+10.3
Liberal	Julius Bertram	3,877	40.2	−10.3
Majority		1,884	19.6	N/A
Turnout		9,638	88.5	+4.6
Registered electors				
Conservative gain from Liberal		Swing	+10.3	

=== Elections in the 1900s ===
General election 1906: Hitchin
Party	Candidate	Votes	%	±%
Liberal	Julius Bertram	4,157	50.5	New
Conservative	J J W Miller	4,081	49.5	N/A
Majority		76	1.0	N/A
Turnout		8,238	83.9	N/A
Registered electors		9,820		
Liberal gain from Conservative		Swing	N/A	

General election 1900: Hitchin
Party	Candidate	Votes	%	±%
Conservative	George Bickersteth Hudson	Unopposed		
Registered electors				
Conservative hold				

=== Elections in the 1890s ===
General election 1895: Hitchin
Party	Candidate	Votes	%	±%
Conservative	George Bickersteth Hudson	Unopposed		
Registered electors				
Conservative hold				

General election 1892: Hitchin
Party	Candidate	Votes	%	±%
Conservative	George Bickersteth Hudson	4,187	60.5	N/A
Liberal	John Wattridge	2,728	39.5	New
Majority		1,459	21.0	N/A
Turnout		6,915	77.0	N/A
Registered electors		8,982		
Conservative hold		Swing	N/A	

=== Elections in the 1880s ===
General election 1886: Hitchin
Party	Candidate	Votes	%	±%
Conservative	Robert Dimsdale	Unopposed		
Conservative hold				

General election 1885: Hitchin
Party	Candidate	Votes	%
Conservative	Robert Dimsdale	4,419	60.6
Liberal	Henry Fordham	2,869	39.4
Majority		1,550	21.2
Turnout		7,288	81.0
Registered electors		8,996	
Conservative win (new seat)			

== See also ==
- List of parliamentary constituencies in Hertfordshire
- List of parliamentary constituencies in the East of England (region)
