= Antony Bulwer-Lytton, Viscount Knebworth =

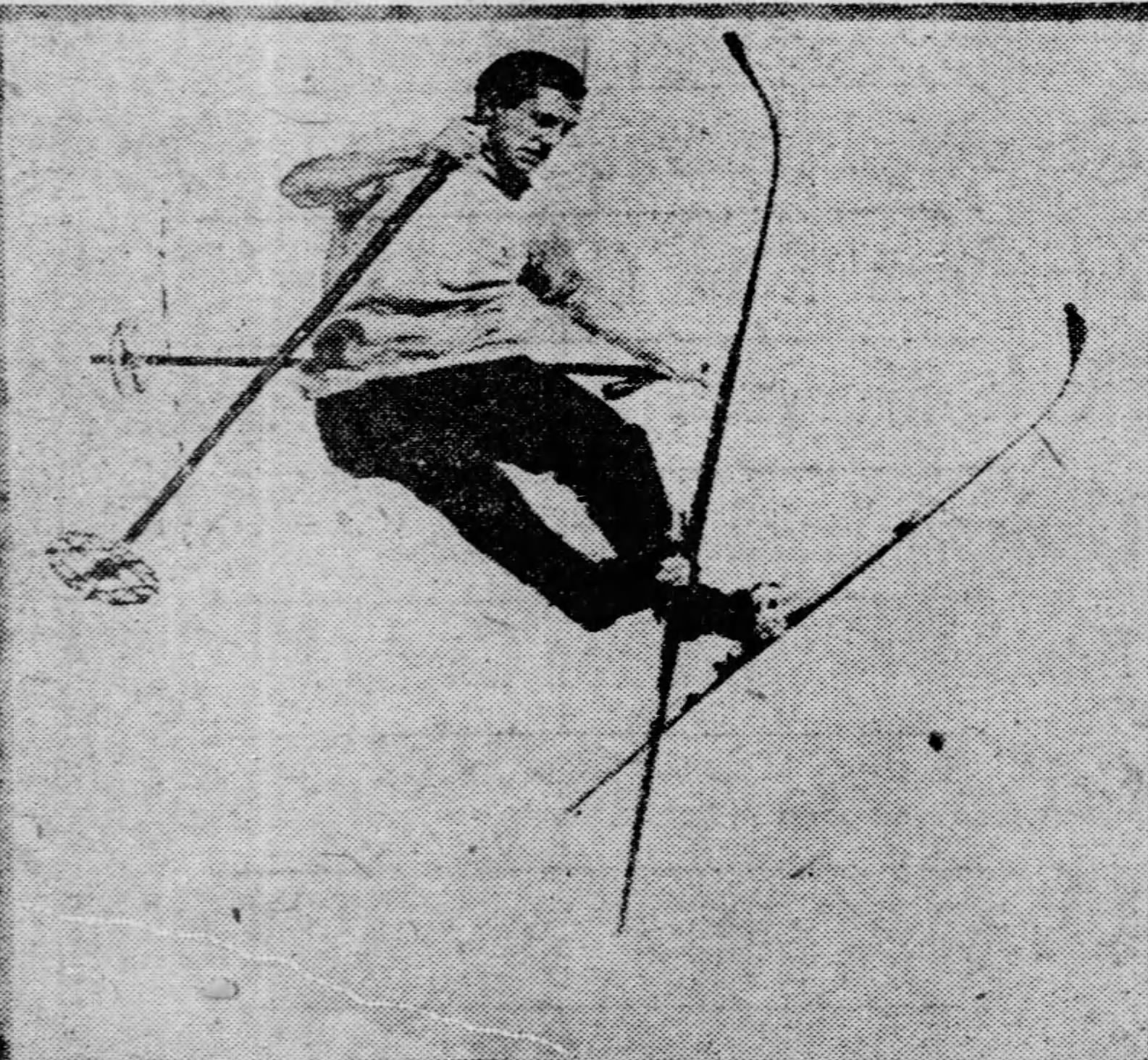
Lord Knebworth at a race in Mürren, circa 1925

Edward Antony James Bulwer-Lytton, Viscount Knebworth (13 May 1903 – 1 May 1933), was a British pilot and Conservative politician.

Knebworth was the eldest son of Victor Bulwer-Lytton, 2nd Earl of Lytton, and his wife, Pamela, daughter of Sir Trevor Chichele-Plowden. Lady Hermione Lytton was his sister. He was educated at Eton and Oxford University. Knebworth was a competitive skier and had entered the British Ski Championskip during the 1923–24 season. He worked briefly as a stockbroker in London before taking up a post in the Education Department of the Central Conservative Office. Knebworth unsuccessfully contested the Labour stronghold of Shoreditch in 1929, but was returned to Parliament for Hitchin in 1931.

The latter year, he also joined the Royal Auxiliary Air Force and qualified as a pilot the following year. He served with the force's 601 (County of London) Squadron.

It was while serving with the Auxiliary Air Force that Lord Knebworth was killed in the crash of a Hawker Hart at Hendon on 1 May 1933, aged 29. He was taking part in a practice flight for the upcoming annual air pageant there when his plane failed to pull out of dive and hit the ground, also killing his crewman. His younger brother Alexander was killed at the Second Battle of El Alamein in 1942 and their uncle Neville Bulwer-Lytton later succeeded in the earldom.

Parliament of the United Kingdom
Preceded by Guy Molesworth Kindersley	Member of Parliament for Hitchin; 1931–1933	Succeeded by Sir Arnold Wilson
