= Guy Kindersley =

British politician (1876-1956)

Guy Molesworth Kindersley (28 February 1876 – 30 November 1956) was a Conservative Party politician in the United Kingdom who represented Hitchin, Hertfordshire.

Kindersley was the son of Edward Nassau Molesworth Kindersley and his wife Ada Good Murray and brother of Lord Kindersley. He was educated at Windlesham House School and Marlborough College. He became a stockbroker and was a major in the army. In the 1923 general election he was elected as MP for Hitchin and retained the seat in 1924. He inadvertently played a major part in this Conservative victory. He was explosively anti-Communist and was used in the matter of the Zinoviev letter. A former MI5 agent and a director of a City company took the forged letter to Kindersley, his "trusted friend in the City", just before the 1924 election. Kindersley, unaware of the plot, took the letter to the Daily Mail, and its publication is claimed to have had devastating results for the Labour Party at the 1924 election. However recent research into the electoral results makes it clear that the real losers in the 1924 election were the Liberals. The Zinoviev letter was a red herring. It is now known through British government and intelligence records that everything the letter contained had been common knowledge since the creation of the Communist Party of Great Britain on 31 July 1920. To claim that the British government did not know the mandate of the Soviet Comintern and the real purpose of the CPGB by 1924 is disingenuous.

Kindersley retained the safe seat in the 1929 general election. Harold Macmillan, later Prime Minister, had lost his seat at that election and was looking at Hitchin as a safer seat, knowing that Kindersley was planning to retire. However Macmillan wrote a letter of support for Oswald Mosley and an attack on the Baldwin government because it would not implement a programme of public works to tackle unemployment. Kindersley told him not to do it again, and when Macmillan refused to back down, Kindersley announced he would fight the seat again, thus scuppering Macmillan's chances. In the event he did resign his seat at 1931 general election (and Macmillan was returned at his old seat at Stockton).

Kindersley married Kathleen Agnes Rhoda Elton 30 July 1903. She was the daughter of the Arts and Crafts potter Sir Edmund Elton. Their son David Kindersley became an engraver and script designer.

Parliament of the United Kingdom
Preceded by Lord Robert Cecil	Member of Parliament for Hitchin; 1923–1931	Succeeded by Viscount Knebworth
