= Alfred Hillier =

British politician

Alfred Peter Hillier (1858, Stroud, Gloucestershire – 24 October 1911) was a Conservative MP for Hitchin.

His father Peter was a bacon factor and miller and with his wife Mary lived at Noades House, Shortwood, Near Nailsworth, Gloucestershire. Hillier's continued as a Bacon curers in Nailsworth until the mid-1980s

Hillier spent a large portion of his life in South Africa, where he moved at the age of 16. He obtained a Bachelor of Arts degree at the University of the Cape of Good Hope, and served as a trooper during the Ninth Xhosa War of 1877–1879.

He qualified as a doctor at the University of Edinburgh. He returned to South Africa, and set up a medical practice there. He was imprisoned and fined for alleged involvement in the Jameson Raid.

He returned to Britain, and became involved in Unionist politics. After failing to be elected for Stockport in 1900 and for Luton in 1906, he won Hitchin from the Liberals in January 1910, and was re-elected in December 1910.

Hillier committed suicide in 1911, dying at home, 20, Eccleston Square, Westminster. At the inquest a verdict of "suicide while temporarily insane" was returned. He left an estate valued for probate at £8,428.
