= Julie Marson =

British politician

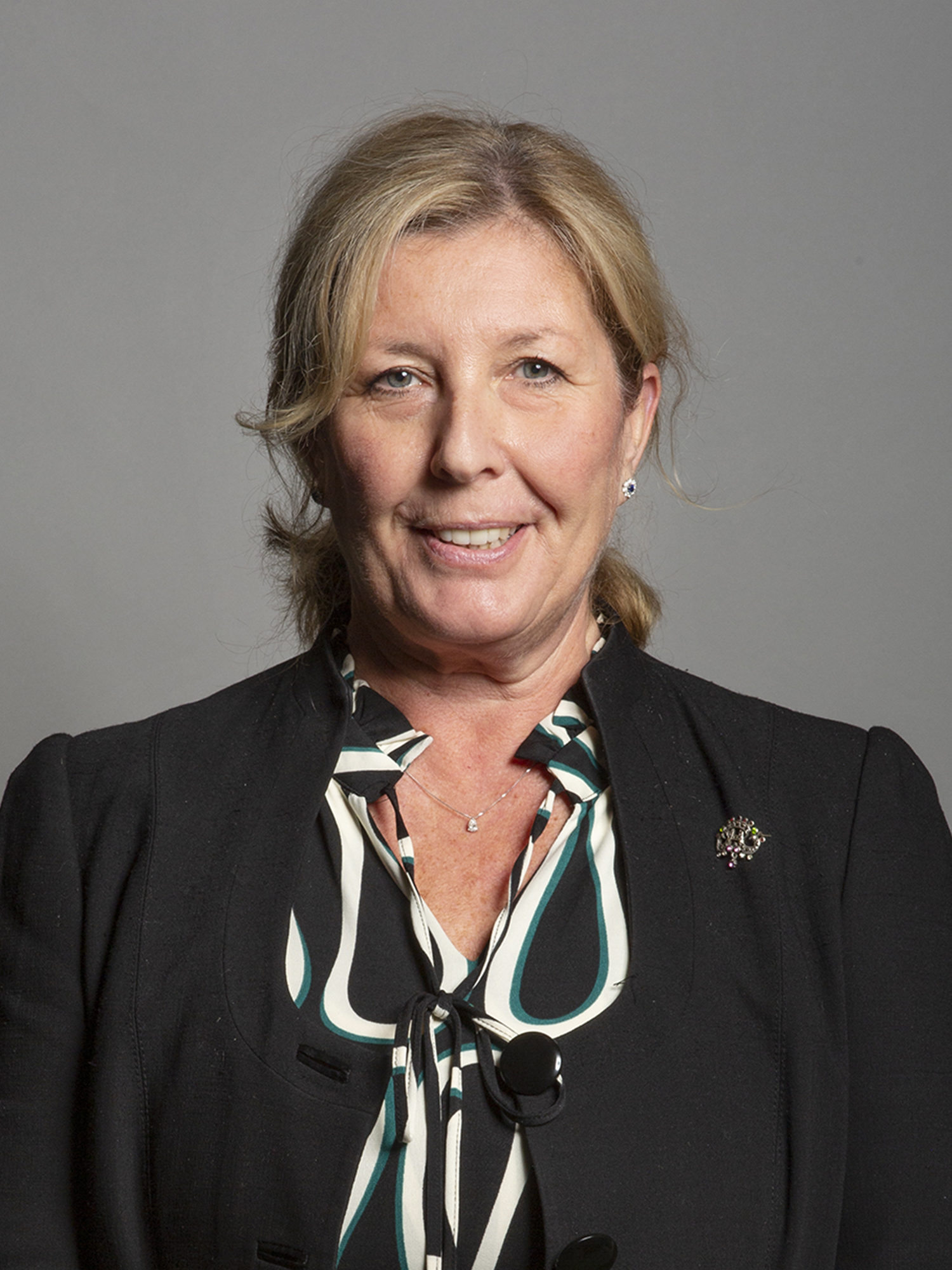
- Official portrait, 2019

Assistant Government Whip
- In office 27 October 2022 – 13 November 2023
- Prime Minister: Rishi Sunak
- In office 8 July 2022 – 20 September 2022
- Prime Minister: Boris Johnson
- Preceded by: Andrea Jenkyns

Parliamentary Under-Secretary of State for Employment
- In office 8 July 2022 – 20 September 2022
- Prime Minister: Boris Johnson
- Preceded by: Mims Davies
- Succeeded by: Victoria Prentis

Member of Parliament for Hertford and Stortford
- In office 12 December 2019 – 30 May 2024
- Preceded by: Mark Prisk
- Succeeded by: Josh Dean

Personal details
- Born: 23 March 1965 (age 61) Barking, London, England
- Party: Conservative

Julie Marson (born 23 March 1965) is the former Member of Parliament for Hertford and Stortford. She served as an Assistant Government Whip from October 2022 to November 2023, having previously held the office from July to September 2022. A member of the Conservative Party, she also served as Parliamentary Under-Secretary of State for Employment between July 2022 and September 2022. She was elected as the Member of Parliament (MP) for Hertford and Stortford in the 2019 general election. She was defeated at the 2024 general election, with Labour candidate Josh Dean elected as the new MP.

== Early life and career ==
Marson was born in Barking, London and previously worked in finance. She was educated at Woodford County High School for Girls and Downing College, Cambridge. Prior to becoming an MP, she worked in corporate banking for NatWest.

== Political career ==
Marson was previously a councillor on Thanet District Council in Kent, representing the Viking ward from 2011 to 2015. She has also served as a magistrate.

She contested the Labour-held East London seat of Dagenham and Rainham at the 2015 general election, finishing in third place. She stood again two years later, at the 2017 snap election, this time finishing in second place and increasing her vote share by 16%.

On 24 October 2019, the Hertford and Stortford Conservative Association chose Marson to succeed the incumbent MP Mark Prisk as their candidate in what has generally been considered a safe seat for the Conservative Party. At the general election on 12 December 2019, Marson was elected as the MP for Hertford and Stortford, with a majority of over 19,000.

After the 2022 government crisis, she was appointed Parliamentary Under-Secretary of State for Employment. She answered her first questions as a minister in the House of Commons on 11 July.

In April 2023, she failed to be automatically reselected for the 2024 general election by her local party executive following a vote. After a ballot of party members she was reselected.

== Political positions ==
Marson supported Leave in the 2016 referendum on EU membership. On 8 June 2020, she called for a global ban on wet markets. Marson has supported initiatives promoting women in STEM and businesses.

== Personal life ==
Marson is married with a son.

Parliament of the United Kingdom
Preceded by Mark Prisk	Member of Parliament for Hertford and Stortford; 2019–2024	Succeeded by Josh Dean
