= East Hertfordshire =

Coordinates: 51°54′N 00°00′W

East Hertfordshire District
- Non-metropolitan district
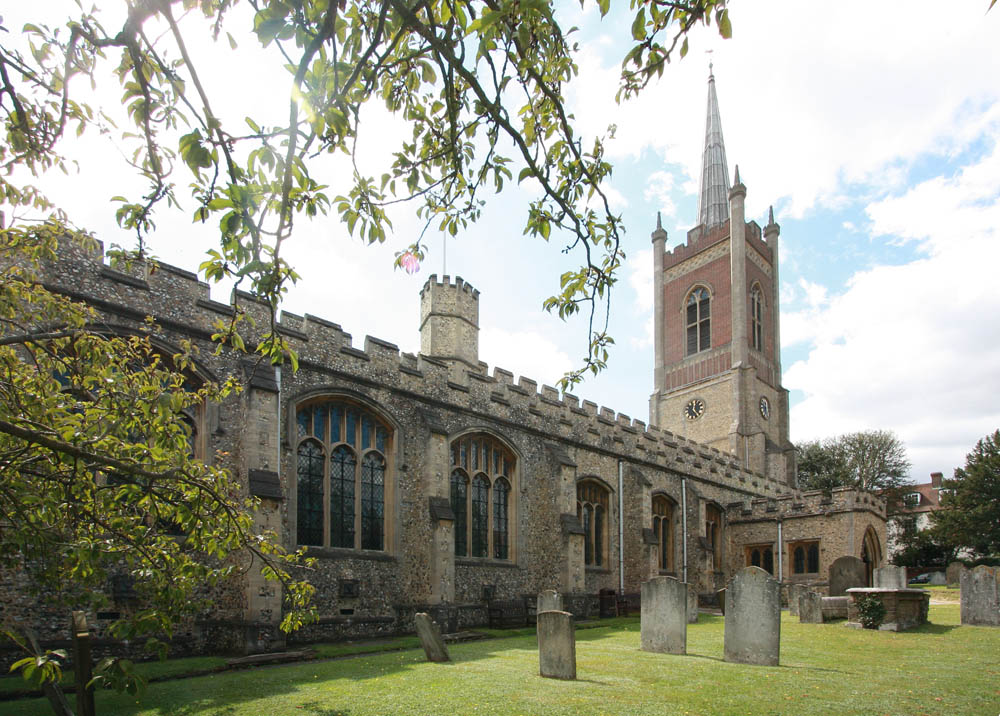
- St Michael's Church, Bishop's Stortford

- East Hertfordshire shown within Hertfordshire
- Sovereign state: United Kingdom
- Constituent country: England
- Region: East of England
- Non-metropolitan county: Hertfordshire
- Status: Non-metropolitan district
- Admin HQ: Hertford
- Incorporated: 1 April 1974

Government
  - Type: Non-metropolitan district council
  - Body: East Herts Council
  - MPs: Kevin Bonavia (L); Lewis Cocking (C); Josh Dean (L); Chris Hinchliff (L)

Area
  - Total: 183.66 sq mi (475.69 km^{2})
  - Rank: 81st (of 296)

Population (2025)
  - Total: 158,033
  - Rank: 144th (of 296)
  - Density: 860.44/sq mi (332.22/km^{2})

Ethnicity (2021)
  - Ethnic groups: List: 92.3% White; 2.8% Mixed; 2.7% Asian; 1.3% Black; 0.9% other

Religion (2021)
  - Religion: List: 49.1% Christianity; 41.8% no religion; 7.9% other; 1.2% Islam
- Time zone: UTC0 (GMT)
  - Summer (DST): UTC+1 (BST)
- ONS code: 26UD (ONS); E07000242 (GSS)
- OS grid reference: TL3758624322

East Hertfordshire is one of ten local government districts in Hertfordshire, England. Its council is based in Hertford, the county town of Hertfordshire. The largest town in the district is Bishop's Stortford, and the other main towns are Ware, Buntingford and Sawbridgeworth. At the 2011 Census, the population of the district was 137,687. By area it is the largest of the ten local government districts in Hertfordshire. The district borders North Hertfordshire, Stevenage, Welwyn Hatfield and Broxbourne in Hertfordshire, and Epping Forest, Harlow and Uttlesford in Essex.

In the 2006 edition of Channel 4's "Best and Worst Places to Live in the UK", East Hertfordshire was rated the seventh-best district to live in. In 2012, East Hertfordshire came ninth in Halifax bank's annual survey of most desirable places to live. It came first in this survey in 2020.

== History ==
East Hertfordshire was created on 1 April 1974 under the Local Government Act 1972, covering the whole area of six former districts and most of a seventh, which were all abolished at the same time:

- Bishop's Stortford Urban District
- Braughing Rural District
- Hertford Municipal Borough
- Hertford Rural District (except part within designated area of Stevenage New Town)
- Sawbridgeworth Urban District
- Ware Rural District
- Ware Urban District

The new district was named East Hertfordshire, reflecting its position within the wider county.

The boundaries of East Hertfordshire have remained largely consistent since 1974, although minor alterations have been made on occasion, particularly along the eastern boundary which largely follows the River Stort to reflect the changing course of the river, and along the border with Stevenage to respond to new developments.

Under current local government reorganisation plans, all district councils in Hertfordshire, as well as the county council, will be abolished in 2028, with the district becoming part of a larger East Hertfordshire and Broxbourne unitary authority.

== Governance ==
East Herts Council

Type
- Type: Non-metropolitan district

Leadership
- Chair: John Dunlop, Green since 13 May 2026
- Leader: Ben Crystall, Green since 17 May 2023
- Chief Executive: Helen Standen since 19 September 2024

Structure
- Seats: 50 councillors
- Political groups: Administration (25) Green (15) Liberal Democrats (10) Other parties (25) Conservative (15) Labour (5) Reform UK (2) Independent (3)

Elections
- Voting system: First past the post
- Last election: 4 May 2023
- Next election: 6 May 2027

Meeting place
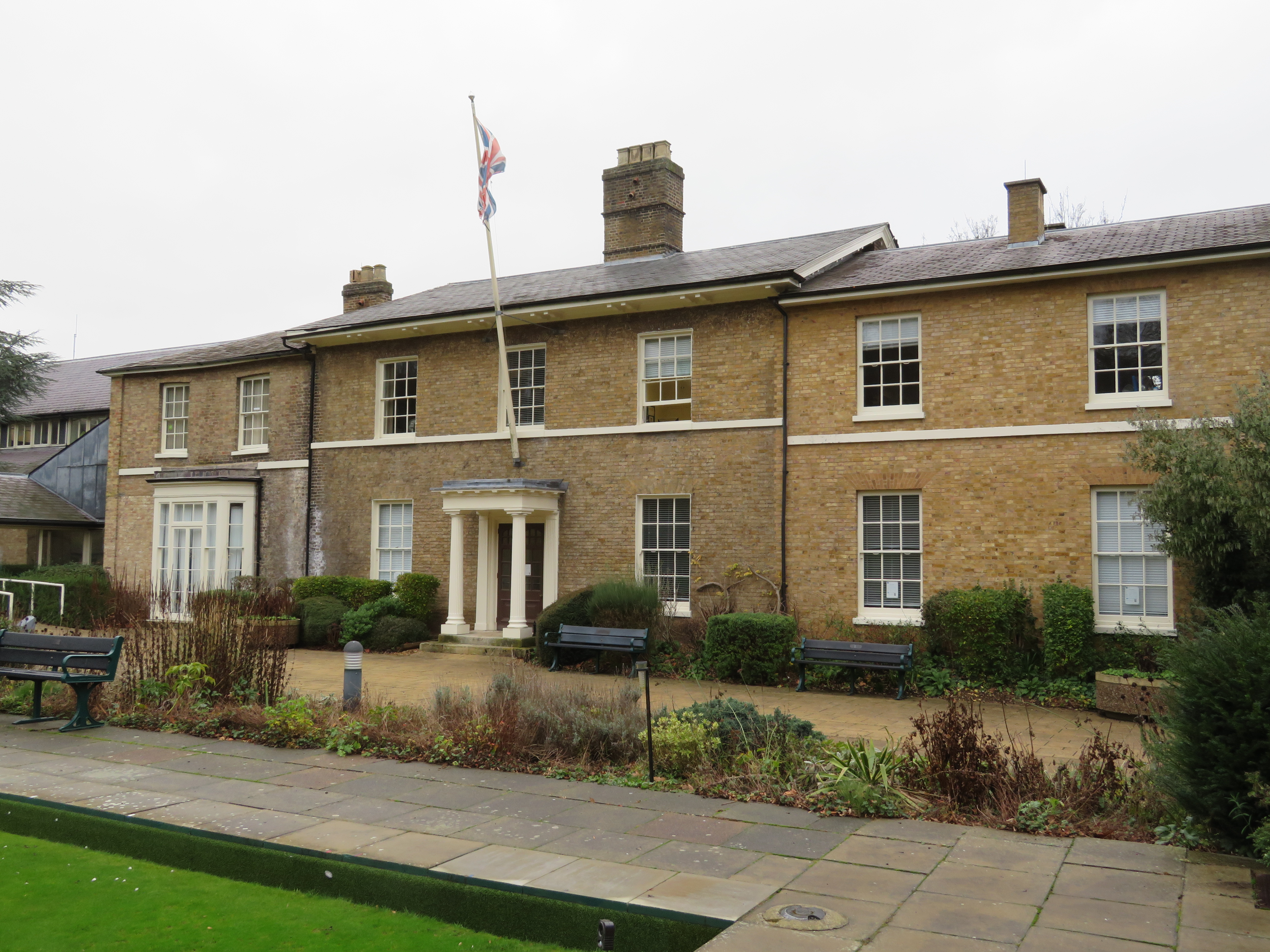
- Wallfields, Pegs Lane, Hertford, SG13 8EQ

Website
- www.eastherts.gov.uk

Hertfordshire has a two-tier structure of local government, with the ten district councils (including East Herts Council) providing district-level services, and Hertfordshire County Council providing county-level services. The whole district is also covered by civil parishes, which form a third tier of local government.

East Herts Council is responsible for a range of local services including refuse and recycling collection, planning, building control, licensing, housing, parking and council tax collection. The council is officially called 'East Hertfordshire District Council', but its corporate branding is 'East Herts Council'.

=== Political control ===
The council has been under no overall control since the 2023 election, being run by a Green Party and Liberal Democrats coalition, led by Green councillor Ben Crystall.

The first election to East Hertfordshire District Council was held in 1973, initially operating as a shadow authority alongside the outgoing authorities until the new system came into force on 1 April 1974. Political control since 1974 has been as follows:

Party in control	Years
No overall control	1974–1976
Conservative	1976–1995
No overall control	1995–1999
Conservative	1999–2023
No overall control	2023–present

=== Leadership ===
The role of Chairman of East Hertfordshire District Council is largely ceremonial. They preside at council meetings and act as first citizen of the district. They are chosen from the councillors but have to maintain a non-political stance, although they do have the right to exercise an additional casting vote in the case of a tied vote at a meeting. The role of chairman is usually held by a different councillor each year.

Political leadership is provided by the leader of the council. The leaders since 2001 have been:

Councillor	Party	From	To
Mike Carver	Conservative	2001	Jan 2006
Tony Jackson	Conservative	22 Feb 2006	May 2015
Linda Haysey	Conservative	20 May 2015	May 2023
Ben Crystall	Green	17 May 2023	

=== Composition ===
Following the 2023 election and by-elections and changes up to october 2026, the composition of the council was:

Party	Councillors
Conservative	15
Green	15
Liberal Democrats	10
Labour	5
Reform	2
Independent	3
Total	50

The next elections are scheduled for 2027, but may be affected by the upcoming structural changes to local government in England.

=== Premises ===
The council is based at Wallfields on Pegs Lane in Hertford. The original building there was a large nineteenth century house, which had been bought in 1950 by Hertford Rural District Council and converted to become its offices. It subsequently became the headquarters of East Hertfordshire District Council following local government reorganisation in 1974, and large modern extensions have subsequently been added to the original house.

== Elections ==
Since the last boundary changes in 2023, there have been 50 councillors elected from 26 wards. Elections for the whole council are held every four years.

=== Wards ===
The 26 wards of East Hertfordshire are:

- Aston, Datchworth and Walkern
- Bishop's Stortford All Saints
- Bishop's Stortford Central
- Bishop's Stortford North
- Bishop's Stortford Parsonage
- Bishop's Stortford South
- Bishop's Stortford Thorley Manor
- Braughing and Standon
- Buntingford
- Great Amwell and Stansteads
- Hertford Bengeo
- Hertford Castle
- Hertford Heath and Brickendon
- Hertford Kingsmead
- Hertford Rural
- Hertford Sele
- Hunsdon
- Little Hadham and The Pelhams
- Much Hadham
- Sawbridgeworth
- The Mundens
- Ware Priory
- Ware Rural
- Ware St Mary's
- Ware Trinity
- Watton-at-Stone

=== Wider politics ===
East Hertfordshire straddles four parliamentary constituencies: Broxbourne, Hertford and Stortford, North East Hertfordshire and Stevenage.

Seat	Wards (as they existed in December 2020)	MP	Party
Broxbourne	Great Amwell, Hertford Heath, Stanstead Abbots	Lewis Cocking	Conservative
Hertford and Stortford	Bishop's Stortford, All Saints, Bishop's Stortford Central, Bishop's Stortford Meads, Bishop's Stortford Silverleys, Bishop's Stortford South, Hertford Bengeo, Hertford Castle, Hertford Kingsmead, Hertford Sele, Hunsdon, Much Hadham, Sawbridgeworth, Ware Chadwell, Ware Christchurch, Ware St. Mary's, Ware Trinity	Josh Dean	Labour
North East Hertfordshire	Braughing, Buntingford, Hertford Rural North, Hertford Rural South, Little Hadham, Mundens and Cottered, Puckeridge, Thundridge & Standon, Walkern, Watton-at-Stone	Chris Hinchliff	Labour
Stevenage	Datchworth & Aston	Kevin Bonavia	Labour

== Parishes ==
The district is entirely divided into civil parishes. The five parish councils of Bishop's Stortford, Buntingford, Hertford, Sawbridgeworth, and Ware have declared their parishes to be towns, allowing them to take the style 'town council'.

== Transport ==
The district contains only one motorway - a small stretch of the M11 at Bishop's Stortford. The major roads within the district include:

A10 - (north-south) from London to Cambridge: enters after Hoddesdon, Hertfordshire, leaves before Royston dualled.

A414 - (WSW-ENE) from Welwyn to Harlow, through Hertford, where it forms the Hertford by-pass.

A602 - (SE-NW), connecting at A10 at Ware with the A1(M) at Stevenage.

A120 - (west-east) connecting the A10 at Standon with the M11 at Bishop's Stortford.

None of the above roads are classified as trunk roads. Therefore, they are maintained by Hertfordshire County Council while responsibility for the M11 rests with National Highways.

Stansted Airport lies just outside East Hertfordshire, being in the neighbouring district of Uttlesford in Essex. Many of the district's towns have rail services into London at King's Cross, Moorgate, and Liverpool Street.

== Media ==
In terms of television, the area is served by BBC London and ITV London with television signals received from the Crystal Palace transmitter BBC East and ITV Anglia can also be received from the Sandy Heath TV transmitter.

Radio stations for the area are:

- BBC Three Counties Radio
- Heart Hertfordshire

The area is served by local newspaper, Hertfordshire Mercury.

== Employment ==
The district's biggest employer is the pharmaceutical company GlaxoSmithKline, which has a research and manufacturing centre in Ware. The company also has a large research centre and office in neighbouring Stevenage.

== See also ==
- The Hundred Parishes
