= Thanet District Council elections =

Local government elections in Kent, England

Thanet District Council elections are held every four years to elect Thanet District Council in Kent, England. Since the last boundary changes in 2003 the council has comprised 56 councillors representing 23 wards.

== Council elections ==
Year	Conservative	Labour	Liberal Democrats (Note: Includes totals for the predecessors of the Liberal Democrats, the Liberal Party and SDP (both of which participated in the Alliance).)	UKIP	Green	Independents & Others	Council control after election
Local government reorganisation; council established (63 seats)
1973	33	14	5	–	–	11	Conservative
1976	39	11	0	–	0	13	Conservative
New ward boundaries (54 seats)
1979	32	5	1	–	0	16	Conservative
1983	28	8	2	–	0	16	Conservative
1987	25	7	10	–	0	12	No overall control
1991	29	14	2	–	0	9	Conservative
1995	3	45	4	0	0	2	Labour
1999	16	35	0	0	0	3	Labour
New ward boundaries (56 seats)
2003	31	23	1	0	0	1	Conservative
2007	33	19	0	0	0	4	Conservative
2011	27	26	0	0	0	3	No overall control
2015	18	4	0	33	0	1	UKIP
2019	25	20	0	0	3	8 (Note: Including 7 Thanet Independents)	No overall control
2023	17	30	0	0	5	4 (Note: Including 3 Thanet Independents)	Labour

=== May 2023 election results ===
- The Labour Party became the largest party on the council, winning the council from no overall control.

=== May 2019 election results ===
- The Conservative Party became the largest party on the council, with the incumbent UK Independence Party losing every seat.
- The council fell into no overall control.

=== May 2015 election results ===
- The UK Independence Party won control of the council with 33 seats. The Conservative Party won 18 seats, the Labour Party won 4 seats, and one Independent was elected.
- Five UKIP councillors defected to a Democratic Independent Group over September and October 2015 over allegations that the leader of the council prevented the reopening of Manston Airport. This led to UKIP losing a majority on the council. On 5 November, it was reported that a Councillor had defected from UKIP to the Conservatives. In January 2016 UKIP remain the largest group but now with 26 members; there are 19 Conservatives, 5 Democratic Independent Group councillors, 5 Labour and 1 Independent councillor.
- UKIP regained control of the council in 2016, after some independents rejoined the party and following a by-election gain by UKIP from Labour.
- On 21 July 2017, a UKIP councillor defected to the Conservatives, meaning UKIP lost its majority on the council.

=== May 2011 election results ===
- Overall turnout: 42%
- The council went to no overall control, the Conservative Party leading a minority administration with 27 seats, the Labour Party taking 26 seats and the Independents 3 seats.
- A Conservative councillor defected to the Independents in December 2011, subsequently the Labour Party led a minority administration.

=== May 2007 election results ===
- Overall turnout: 35%.
- The Conservative Party held control of Thanet District Council with 33 seats, the Labour Party took 19 seats. There were 3 independents and 1 candidate from Ramsgate First also elected.
- The Ramsgate First candidate defected to the Conservatives shortly after the election.

=== May 2003 election results ===
- Overall turnout: 33%
- The Conservative Party won control of Thanet District Council with a total of 31 seats, the Labour Party taking 23 seats. One Liberal Democrat candidate and one Independent candidate were elected.
- After the 30 October 2003 by-election the composition was: Conservative Party 30 seats, Labour Party 24 seats.

=== May 1999 election results ===
- Overall turnout: 28.9%
- Labour maintained control of Thanet District Council with a total of 35 seats, the Conservatives recovered to 16 seats, the Liberal Democrat candidates were wiped out and 3 Independent candidate were elected.

=== May 1995 election results ===
- Overall turnout: 40.2%
- The Labour Party won control of Thanet District Council with a total of 45 seats, the Conservatives were reduced to 3 seats and 4 Liberal Democrat candidates and 2 Independent candidate were elected.

=== May 1991 election results ===
- Overall turnout: 41.5%
- The Conservative Party retook control of Thanet District Council with a total of 29 seats, the Labour Party taking 14 seats, 2 Liberal Democrat candidate and 9 Independent candidate were elected.

=== May 1987 election results ===
- Overall turnout: 44.8%
- The Conservative Party lost enough seats to lose the council to No Overall Control (NOC). Conservatives had 25 seats, the Labour Party took 7 seats, 10 Liberal/SDP and 12 Independent candidates were elected.

=== May 1983 election results ===
- Overall turnout: 44.1%
- The Conservative Party lost seats but continued in control of Thanet District Council with a total of 28 seats, the Labour Party took 8 seats, 2 Liberal/SDP candidate and 16 Independent candidates elected.

=== May 1979 election results ===
- Overall turnout: 71.1% (the election coincided with the General Election.
- The Conservative Party continued to control the Council with a total of 32 seats, the Labour Party reduced to 5 seats, one Liberal candidate and 16 Independent candidates were elected.

=== May 1976 election results ===
- Overall turnout: 47.7%
- The Conservative Party kept control of Thanet District Council with a total of 39 seats, the Labour Party taking 11 seats and 13 Independent candidate were elected.

=== May 1973 election results ===
- The council was created from Margate Municipal Borough, Ramsgate Municipal Borough, Broadstairs & St Peters Urban District and parts of Eastry Rural District.
- Overall turnout: 44.2%
- The Conservative Party won control of Thanet District Council with a total of 33 seats, the Labour Party taking 14 seats, Liberals 5 seats, and there was eleven Independent candidates elected.

== County result maps ==
2003 results map

2007 results map

2011 results map

2015 results map

2019 results map

2023 results map

== By-election results ==
=== 1995–1999 ===
Northdown Park By-Election 20 March 1997
Party	Candidate	Votes	%	±%
Labour		548	43.2	
Conservative		338	26.6	
Independent		187	14.7	
Thanet Socialists		133	10.4	
Liberal Democrats		62	4.9	
Majority		210	16.6	
Turnout		1,268		
Labour hold		Swing		

Pier By-Election 1 October 1998
Party	Candidate	Votes	%	±%
Labour		164	51.3	−14.6
Conservative		137	42.8	+27.2
Liberal Democrats		19	5.9	+0.8
Majority		27	8.5	
Turnout		320	15.2	
Labour hold		Swing	-20.9	

=== 1999–2003 ===
Margate West By-Election 18 November 1999
Party	Candidate	Votes	%	±%
Conservative		565	72.9	+34.1
Labour		210	27.1	−10.0
Majority		355	45.8	
Turnout		775	15.5	
Conservative gain from Labour		Swing	+22.1	

Central Westcliffe By-Election 22 June 2000
Party	Candidate	Votes	%	±%
Conservative		858	68.9	+68.9
Labour		388	31.1	−20.4
Majority		470	37.8	
Turnout		1,246	23.1	
Conservative gain from Labour		Swing	+44.7	

Cliftonville By-Election 22 February 2001
Party	Candidate	Votes	%	±%
Conservative		1,026	60.4	−0.5
Labour		544	32.0	−7.1
Independent		130	7.6	+7.6
Majority		482	28.4	
Turnout		1,700	27.4	
Conservative hold		Swing	+3.3	

=== 2003–2007 ===
Margate Central By-Election 30 October 2003
Party	Candidate	Votes	%	±%
Labour	John Watkins	370	41.0	−4.8
Conservative	Ramesh Chhabra	201	22.3	−23.2
BNP	Robert Parker	172	19.1	+19.1
Liberal Democrats	Guy Voizey	85	9.4	+9.4
UKIP	Timothy Stocks	37	4.1	+4.1
Socialist Alliance	Karen Cardwell	19	2.1	+2.1
Independent	Francis Foy	18	2.0	−10.7
Majority		169	18.7	
Turnout		902	25.9	
Labour gain from Conservative		Swing	+9.2	

Sir Moses Montefiore By-Election 15 July 2004
Party	Candidate	Votes	%	±%
Labour	Alan Poole	378	33.2	−13.3
Conservative	Robert Burgess	342	30.1	−6.1
UKIP	Michael Taylor	288	25.3	+25.3
Liberal Democrats	Vincent Knight	130	11.4	−5.9
Majority		36	3.1	
Turnout		1,138	31.1	
Labour hold		Swing	+3.6	

=== 2007–2011 ===
Thanet Villages By-Election 4 June 2009
Party	Candidate	Votes	%	±%
Independent	Bob Grove	937	47.3	+4.0
Conservative	Peter Landi	596	30.1	−6.5
Liberal Democrats	Louisa Latham	316	15.9	+15.9
Labour	Rebecca Scobie	133	6.7	−13.4
Majority		341	17.2	
Turnout		1,982	41.0	
Independent hold		Swing	+5.3	

Dane Valley By-Election 3 December 2009
Party	Candidate	Votes	%	±%
Labour	Sandra Hart	318	34.2	−3.9
Liberal Democrats	Bill Furness	260	28.0	+28.0
Conservative	Ingrid Spencer	222	23.9	−19.7
Independent	Wendy Allan	130	14.0	−4.4
Majority		58	6.2	
Turnout		930	17.0	
Labour gain from Conservative		Swing		

=== 2015-2019 ===
Newington by-election 21 January 2016
Party	Candidate	Votes	%	±%
Labour	Karen Constantine	288	37.7	+1.3
UKIP	Duncan Smithson	229	30.0	−14.2
Conservative	Adam Dark	156	20.4	+0.5
Independent	Alan Hodder	49	6.4	+6.4
Green	Ian Driver	20	2.6	+2.6
Liberal Democrats	Jordan Williams	12	1.6	+1.6
Independent	Grahame Birchall	10	1.3	+1.3
Majority		59	7.7	
Turnout		764		
Labour gain from UKIP		Swing		

Newington by-election 30 June 2016
Party	Candidate	Votes	%	±%
UKIP	Roy Potts	295	40.2	−4.0
Labour	David Green	281	38.3	+1.9
Conservative	Adam Dark	125	17.0	−2.5
Liberal Democrats	Matthew Brown	33	4.5	+4.5
Majority		14	1.9	
Turnout		734		
UKIP hold		Swing		

Northwood by-election 18 August 2016 (2 seats)
Party	Candidate	Votes	%	±%
UKIP	Lynda Piper	488		
UKIP	George Rusiecki	394		
Labour	Helen CrittendenKaz Peet	356		
Labour	Kaz Peet	325		
Conservative	Charlie Leys	282		
Conservative	Marc Rattigan	246		
Independent	Colin Grostate	136		
Liberal Democrats	Jordan Williams	64		
Liberal Democrats	John Finnegan	48		
Party for a United Thanet	Grahame Birchall	44		
UKIP hold		Swing		
UKIP hold		Swing		

Margate Central by-election 3 August 2017
Party	Candidate	Votes	%	±%
Labour	Ian Venables	454	57.5	+23.7
Conservative	Reece Pugh	190	24.1	+3.6
UKIP	Liz Plewis	52	6.6	−25.2
Liberal Democrats	John Finnegan	33	4.2	+4.2
No description	Dean McCastree	24	3.0	+3.0
Green	Bernard Kirkham	23	2.9	−8.6
Independent	Pip Rees	13	1.6	+1.6
Majority		264	33.4	
Turnout		790	21.3	
Labour gain from UKIP		Swing		

Thanet Villages by-election 11 January 2018
Party	Candidate	Votes	%	±%
Conservative	Reece Pugh	620	49.3	+23.4
Liberal Democrats	Angie Curwen	313	24.9	+24.9
Labour	Pauline Farrance	206	16.4	+5.9
Green	Natasha Ransom	66	5.3	−6.9
Independent	Sonia Smyth	52	4.1	+4.1
Majority		307	24.4	
Turnout		1,257		
Conservative hold		Swing		

Birchington South by-election 26 July 2018
Party	Candidate	Votes	%	±%
Conservative	Linda Wright	651	63.0	+35.4
Labour	Helen Whitehead	265	25.7	+12.5
Liberal Democrats	Hannah Lloyd-Bowyer	117	11.3	+5.7
Majority		386	37.4	
Turnout		1,033		
Conservative gain from UKIP		Swing		

=== 2019-2023 ===
Cliffsend and Pegwell by-election 13 February 2020
Party	Candidate	Votes	%	±%
Conservative	Marc Rattigan	516	50.8	+14.1
Green	Charlotte Barton	290	28.5	+10.4
Labour	David Green	109	10.7	−4.4
Independent	Grahame Birchall	101	9.9	−5.8
Majority		226	22.2	
Turnout		1,016		
Conservative hold		Swing		

Central Harbour by-election 6 May 2021
Party	Candidate	Votes	%	±%
Green	Tricia Austin	776	41.1	+11.3
Labour	David Green	631	33.4	−2.0
Conservative	John Davis	480	25.4	+11.9
Majority		145	7.7	
Turnout		1,887		
Green gain from Labour		Swing		

Dane Valley by-election 6 May 2021
Party	Candidate	Votes	%	±%
Conservative	David Wallin	491	39.4	+15.7
Labour	Martin Boyd	461	37.0	+11.4
Thanet Ind.	Mark Websper	294	23.6	+11.3
Majority		30	2.4	
Turnout		1,246		
Conservative gain from Thanet Ind.		Swing		

Newington by-election 6 May 2021
Party	Candidate	Votes	%	±%
Conservative	Trevor Shonk	265	37.2	+14.0
Labour	Mary King	260	36.5	−14.4
Green	Katie Gerrard	144	20.2	−5.6
Independent	Grahame Birchall	43	6.0	+6.0
Majority		5	0.7	
Turnout		712		
Conservative gain from Labour		Swing		

Cliftonville East by-election 22 July 2021
Party	Candidate	Votes	%	±%
Conservative	Charlie Leys	723	74.5	+14.8
Labour	Don Challinger	211	21.7	−1.0
Women's Equality	Kanndiss Riley	37	3.8	−13.8
Majority		512	52.7	
Turnout		971		
Conservative hold		Swing		

Thanet Villages by-election 11 November 2021
Party	Candidate	Votes	%	±%
Green	Abi Smith	638	60.0	+36.8
Conservative	Guy Wilson	358	33.7	+9.0
Liberal Democrats	Jeremy de Rose	67	6.3	−15.7
Majority		280	26.3	
Turnout		1,063		
Green hold		Swing		

Nethercourt by-election 24 March 2022
Party	Candidate	Votes	%	±%
Labour	Anne-Marie Nixey	505	55.5	+16.8
Conservative	John Davis	230	25.3	−1.7
Thanet Ind.	Claire Tilbrook	175	19.2	+19.2
Majority		275	30.2	
Turnout		910		
Labour hold		Swing		

=== 2023-2027 ===
Thanet Villages by-election 1 May 2025
Party	Candidate	Votes	%	±%
Reform	Peter Evans	781	37.8	+37.8
Conservative	Ash Ashbee	433	21.0	–17.2
Thanet Ind.	Ian Driver	407	19.7	+19.7
Green	Will Jarman	204	9.9	–24.4
Liberal Democrats	Deborah Holmes	116	5.6	–1.2
Labour	Bryan Harrod	107	5.2	–8.7
Independent	Grahame Birchall	17	0.8	+0.8
Majority		348	16.8	
Turnout		2,092	31.4	+4.4
Registered electors		6,674		
Reform gain from Conservative				

Garlinge by-election 30 October 2025
Party	Candidate	Votes	%	±%
Reform	Darren Oxborrow	348	44.6	+44.6
Conservative	Kerry Boyd	250	32.0	+10.6
Labour	Bryan Harrod	62	7.9	−12.3
Green	Deb Shotton	61	7.8	−1.3
Liberal Democrats	Matthew Brown	36	4.6	+4.6
Independent	Ian Driver	24	3.1	+3.1
Majority		98	12.5	
Turnout		781		
Registered electors		3,696		
Reform gain from Thanet Ind.				
