= Lesley Titcomb =

British accountant (born 1961)

- Born: Lesley Jane Titcomb; June 1961 (age 64)
- Education: St Anne's College, Oxford
- Occupation: Accountant
- Title: Former chief executive, The Pensions Regulator
- Term: March 2015 - February 2019
- Successor: Charles Counsell
- Spouse: Mark Prisk

Lesley Jane Titcomb CBE (born June 1961) was the chief executive of The Pensions Regulator from March 2015 to February 2019. Titcomb was previously chief operating officer and a board member of the Financial Conduct Authority.

== Early life ==
Lesley Jane Titcomb was born in June 1961, the daughter of a policeman father and a mother who is an ordained priest. Titcomb has a bachelor's degree in Classics from St Anne's College, Oxford.

== Career ==
Titcomb qualified as a chartered accountant with Ernst and Young, and worked there from 1984-1994.

Titcomb worked for the Securities and Investment Board from 1994 to 1999, then the FSA/FCA from 1999 to 2015, where she was chief operating officer from 2010 to 2015.

After The Pensions Regulator and its leadership was seriously criticised by MPs following Carillion's 2018 liquidation, Titcomb said she would be standing down at the end of her current contract in February 2019.

Titcomb was appointed Commander of the Order of the British Empire (CBE) in the 2019 Birthday Honours for services to pensions regulation.

== Personal life ==
She is married to Mark Prisk, the former Conservative Member of Parliament (MP) for Hertford and Stortford, and a former government minister.
