= Mark Prisk =

British politician (born 1962)

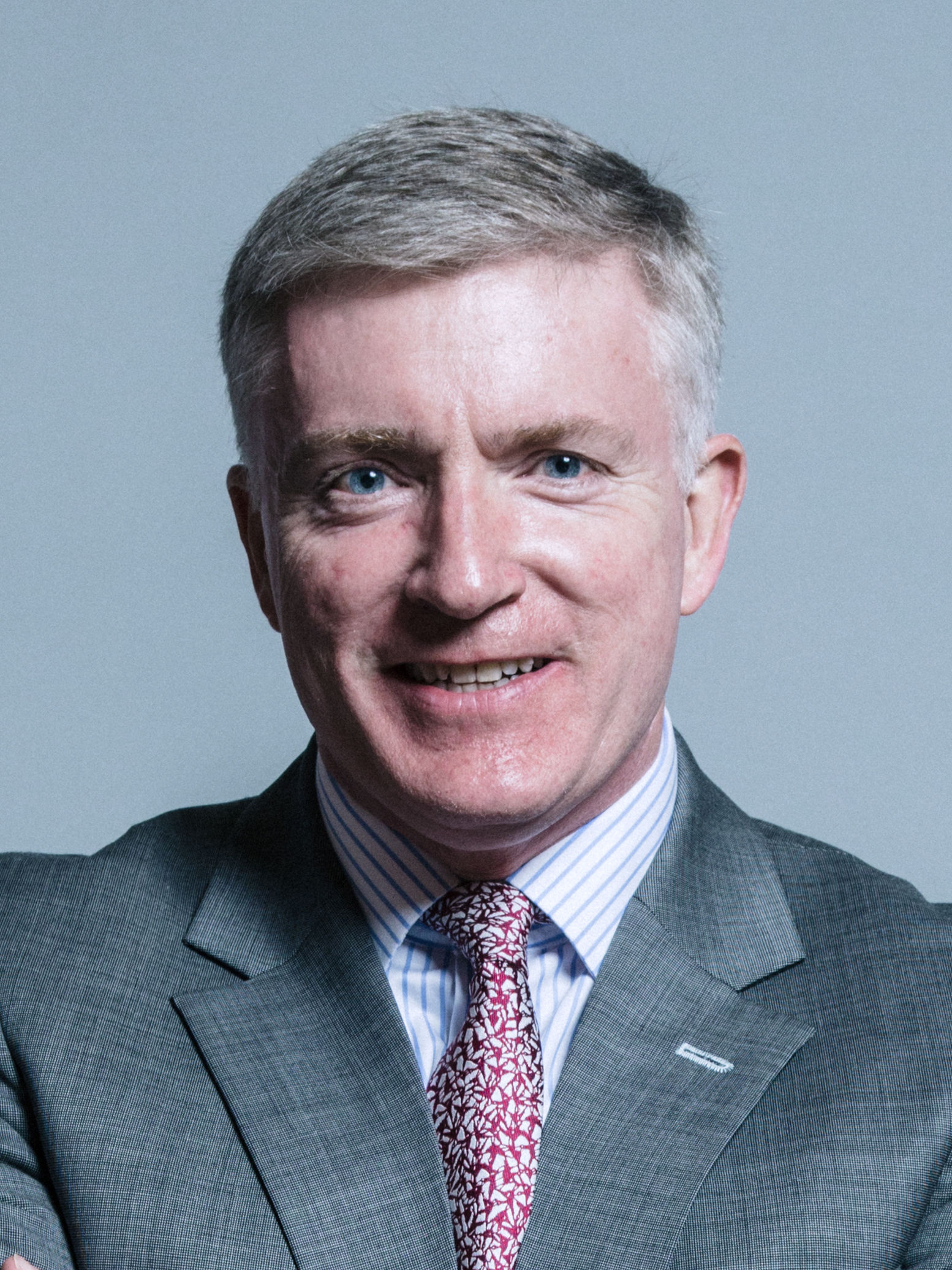
- Official portrait, 2017

Minister of State for Housing and Local Government
- In office 4 September 2012 – 7 October 2013
- Prime Minister: David Cameron
- Preceded by: Grant Shapps
- Succeeded by: Kris Hopkins

Minister of State for Business and Enterprise
- In office 13 May 2010 – 4 September 2012
- Prime Minister: David Cameron
- Preceded by: Pat McFadden
- Succeeded by: Michael Fallon

Shadow Minister for Business, Innovation and Skills (Note: Business, Enterprise and Regulatory Reform (2005–09))
- In office 10 May 2005 – 6 May 2010
- Leader: David Cameron
- Preceded by: Office established
- Succeeded by: Ian Lucas

Shadow Paymaster General
- In office 1 June 2003 – 1 June 2004
- Leader: Michael Howard

Shadow Financial Secretary to the Treasury
- In office 1 June 2002 – 1 June 2003 Serving with Stephen O'Brien
- Leader: Iain Duncan Smith
- Preceded by: David Lidington
- Succeeded by: Andrew Tyrie

Member of Parliament for Hertford and Stortford
- In office 7 June 2001 – 6 November 2019
- Preceded by: Bowen Wells
- Succeeded by: Julie Marson

Personal details
- Born: 12 June 1962 (age 64) Redruth, Cornwall, England
- Party: Conservative
- Spouse: Lesley Titcomb
- Education: Truro School, University of Reading
- Website: www.markprisk.com

Michael Mark Prisk (born 12 June 1962) is a British politician who was Member of Parliament (MP) for Hertford and Stortford from 2001 until 2019. A member of the Conservative Party, he was Minister of State for Business and Enterprise from 2010 to 2012 and Minister of State for Housing and Local Government from 2012 to 2013.

== Early life ==
Prisk was born at Redruth, Cornwall and whilst living at Camborne was educated at the fee-paying Truro School in 1973–80. He went on to study Land Management at the University of Reading, gaining a BSc degree. From 1983 to 1985, he was Chairman of the Youth Section of Peace through NATO. He was vice-chairman of the Federation of Conservative Students in 1982–83.

After graduation, Prisk worked in property and economic development and rose to become director of a £3 million practice. From 1983 to 1985, he worked as a graduate surveyor for Knight Frank, then as development surveyor for Derrick Wade & Waters where he became manager of the London office from 1985 to 1989. He was a marketing director from 1989 to 1991, then principal of the Mark Prisk Connection from 1991 to 1997. From 1997 to 2001, he was company owner of MP2.

== Parliamentary career ==
Prisk was Chairman of Cornwall Young Conservatives and after unsuccessfully contesting Newham North West in 1992 and Wansdyke in 1997, he was finally elected as the Conservative MP for the constituency of Hertford and Stortford in 2001. He was promoted from the backbenches to the Opposition frontbench as Shadow Financial Secretary, Shadow Minister for Economic Affairs, an opposition whip and Shadow Minister for Business and Enterprise. He is author of several pamphlets on urban design.

On 26 July 2007, David Cameron appointed Prisk as Shadow Minister for Cornwall, although there was no formal government post for him to shadow. The party said the move was intended to help place the county's concerns "at the heart of Conservative thinking". Cameron said he endorsed the appointment and it would ensure the voice of Cornwall was heard. Liberal Democrat Matthew Taylor claimed the appointment was a bid to get around the rule which requires MPs to limit the local cases they take up to their own constituencies, as the Conservatives had no MPs in Cornwall. Prisk defended his role in open letter to the Falmouth Packet, noting "as a born and bred Cornishman" his role was to listen to the concerns of people in Cornwall, feed these back to the Shadow Cabinet and make sure Conservative policies properly reflected the needs of Cornwall.

No Minister for Cornwall was appointed after the 2010 election; Prisk was appointed as Minister of State for Business and Enterprise in the Cameron–Clegg coalition, until he was shifted to become Minister of State for Housing and Local Government on 5 September 2012. In this role, he was responsible for creating a "Future High Street Forum" to support struggling High Street retailers, but was asked to step down from the frontbench in an October 2013 reshuffle.

Prisk campaigned to remain in the European Union in the lead-up to the 2016 referendum on Britain's membership and his constituency narrowly voted to remain by 50.76% to 49.24%. However, after the referendum result, he supported the Theresa May's plan for implementation of Britain's withdrawal.

On 9 September 2019, Prisk wrote to the chairman of his local Conservative Association to declare he would not be standing at the next general election.

During November 2022, Prisk announced his position as president of the Conservative Mental Health Group (CMHG). Previous to this role Prisk had supported mental health charities, including the Samaritans and Mind.

== Personal life ==
Prisk married Lesley Titcomb, who became CEO at The Pensions Regulator, in April 1989 in Oxfordshire.

== Elections contested ==
Date	Constituency	Party	Votes	% votes	Position	Ref.
1992 general election	Newham North West	Conservative	6,740	25.99	2nd of 6	
1997 general election	Wansdyke	Conservative	19,318	35.3	2nd of 7	
2001 general election	Hertford and Stortford	Conservative	21,074	44.7	Won	
2005 general election	Hertford and Stortford	Conservative	25,074	50.5	Won	
2010 general election	Hertford and Stortford	Conservative	29,810	53.8	Won	
2015 general election	Hertford and Stortford	Conservative	31,593	56.1	Won	
2017 general election	Hertford and Stortford	Conservative	36,184	60.3	Won	

== Notes ==
Parliament of the United Kingdom
Preceded by Bowen Wells	Member of Parliament for Hertford and Stortford; 2001–2019	Succeeded by Julie Marson
