= Bowen Wells =

British politician (born 1935)

Chair of the International Development Select Committee
- In office 17 July 1997 – 18 July 2001
- Preceded by: Office established
- Succeeded by: Tony Baldry

Lord Commissioner of the Treasury
- In office 5 July 1995 – 1 May 1997
- Prime Minister: John Major
- Preceded by: Timothy Wood
- Succeeded by: John McFall

Member of Parliament for Hertford and Stortford Hertford and Stevenage (1979–1983)
- In office 3 May 1979 – 14 May 2001
- Preceded by: Shirley Williams
- Succeeded by: Mark Prisk

Personal details
- Born: 4 August 1935 (age 90)
- Party: Conservative

Petrie Bowen Wells (born 4 August 1935), known as Bowen Wells, is a retired British Conservative Party politician who served as Member of Parliament (MP) for Hertford and Stevenage then Hertford and Stortford from 1979 until 2001. He was also Chair of the International Development Select Committee from 1997 until 2001.

== Education ==
Wells was educated at St Paul's School in London, the University of Exeter, and Regent Street Polytechnic.

== Member of Parliament ==
Wells was first elected in the 1979 general election as MP for Hertford and Stevenage, defeating Labour's Shirley Williams. After boundary changes in the 1983 general election, he served as MP for Hertford and Stortford until the 2001 general election when he retired.

From 1982 until 1983, Wells served in Prime Minister Margaret Thatcher's Government as Parliamentary Private Secretary (PPS) to Minister of State for Employment Michael Alison. He then served twice in John Major's Government; as PPS to Minister of State for Public Transport Roger Freeman from 1992 until 1994, and as a Lord Commissioner of the Treasury from 1995 until 1997.

Wells lost his position in government following the Labour victory in the 1997 general election. Soon after, he was made Chair of the newly formed International Development Select Committee. He remained in the post until his retirement in 2001.

== Personal life ==
Wells is married. He has two sons, Adam and Simon Bowen.

== Sources ==
- UK Politics: People in Parliament, 28 July 1998.
- Profile, guardian.co.uk. Accessed 19 January 2023.

Parliament of the United Kingdom
Preceded by Shirley Williams	Member of Parliament for Hertford and Stevenage; 1979 – 1983	Constituency abolished
New constituency	Member of Parliament for Hertford and Stortford; 1983 – 2001	Succeeded by Mark Prisk
