= 2023 East Hertfordshire District Council election =

- 4 May 2023

All 50 seats to East Hertfordshire District Council 26 seats needed for a majority

	First party	Second party
Leader	Ben Crystall	Linda Haysey
Party	Green	Conservative
Last election	2 seats, 15.0%	40 seats, 45.7%
Seats before	2	39
Seats won	19	16
Seat change	▲17	▼24
Popular vote	22,487	27,166
Percentage	28.4%	34.4%
Swing	▲13.4%	▼11.3%
	Third party	Fourth party
Leader	Mione Goldspink	Carolyn Redfern
Party	Liberal Democrats	Labour
Last election	6 seats, 19.0%	2 seats, 17.3%
Seats before	6	2
Seats won	10	5
Seat change	▲4	▲3
Popular vote	12,417	15,626
Percentage	15.7%	19.8%
Swing	▼3.3%	▲2.5%
- A map showing the results of the East Hertfordshire District Council election 2023 by ward
Leader before election
Linda Haysey
Conservative
Leader after election
Ben Crystall
Green
No overall control

The 2023 East Hertfordshire District Council election took place on 4 May 2023 to elect members of East Hertfordshire District Council in Hertfordshire, England. This was on the same day as other local elections.

The council had been under Conservative majority control since 1999. The incumbent leader of the council, Conservative councillor Linda Haysey, chose not to stand for re-election, having been leader since 2015.

The election left the council under no overall control. The Green Party overtook the Conservatives to become the largest party, winning 19 of the 50 seats on the council whereas the Conservatives only won 16 seats. The Green and Liberal Democrat groups on the council subsequently formed a joint administration; the Green group leader Ben Crystall became leader of the council, and the Liberal Democrat group leader Mione Goldspink became deputy leader of the council.

== Summary ==
=== Election result ===
2023 East Hertfordshire District Council election
Party	Candidates	Seats	Gains	Losses	Net gain/loss	Seats %	Votes %	Votes	+/−
Green	37	19	12	0	▲17	38.0	28.4	22,487	+13.4
Conservative	50	16	0	14	▼24	32.0	34.4	27,166	–11.3
Liberal Democrats	32	10	0	0	▲4	20.0	15.7	12,417	–3.3
Labour	43	5	2	0	▲3	10.0	19.8	15,626	+2.5
Independent	2	0	0	0	Steady	0.0	1.4	1,136	–0.5
Reform	1	0	0	0	Steady	0.0	0.3	218	N/A
Heritage	1	0	0	0	Steady	0.0	<0.1	35	N/A

== Ward results ==
The Statement of Persons Nominated, which details the candidates standing in each ward, was released by East Hertfordshire District Council following the close of nominations on 5 April 2023. The results for each ward were as follows:

=== Aston, Datchworth & Walkern ===
Aston, Datchworth & Walkern (2 seats)
Party	Candidate	Votes	%
Conservative	Tom Deffley	767	52.6
Conservative	Tony Stowe*	715	49.1
Labour	Julia Florence	461	31.6
Green	Lydia Somerville	356	24.4
Liberal Democrats	Freddie Jewitt	272	18.7
Turnout		1,457	38.5
Registered electors		3,784	
Conservative win (new seat)			
Conservative win (new seat)			

=== Bishop's Stortford All Saints ===
Bishop's Stortford All Saints (2 seats)
Party	Candidate	Votes	%	±%
Liberal Democrats	Martin Adams	722	61.2	+14.0
Liberal Democrats	Chris Wilson*	679	57.6	+8.1
Conservative	Laura Snowdon	220	18.7	–16.0
Conservative	Anu Senanayake	184	15.6	–14.5
Labour	Sophia Adams Bhatti	175	14.8	+1.5
Labour	Jane Band	144	12.2	+0.1
Green	Paul Harding	92	7.8	N/A
Heritage	Barry Hensall	35	3.0	N/A
Turnout		1,179	30.9	–5.4
Registered electors		3,816		
Liberal Democrats hold				
Liberal Democrats hold				

=== Bishop's Stortford Central ===
Bishop's Stortford Central (2 seats)
Party	Candidate	Votes	%	±%
Labour	Yvonne Estop	811	45.9	+19.2
Labour	David Jacobs	803	45.4	+19.4
Conservative	George Cutting*	468	26.5	–6.2
Conservative	Norma Symonds*	466	26.4	–6.5
Liberal Democrats	Bob Taylor	464	26.2	–1.7
Green	Paul Williams	263	14.9	–7.8
Turnout		1,768	31.9	+2.5
Registered electors		5,542		
Labour gain from Conservative				
Labour gain from Conservative				

=== Bishop's Stortford North ===
Bishop's Stortford North (3 seats)
Party	Candidate	Votes	%
Liberal Democrats	Sarah Copley	1,028	53.0
Liberal Democrats	Mione Goldspink*	986	50.9
Liberal Democrats	Miriam Swainston	941	48.6
Conservative	Tim Page*	488	25.2
Conservative	Dave Anderson	471	24.3
Conservative	David Moran	452	23.3
Labour	Matthew Bird	352	18.2
Labour	Daniel Barnett	339	17.5
Green	Mark Johnson	301	15.5
Turnout		1,938	34.2
Registered electors		5,667	
Liberal Democrats win (new seat)			
Liberal Democrats win (new seat)			
Liberal Democrats win (new seat)			

=== Bishop's Stortford Parsonage ===
Bishop's Stortford Parsonage (2 seats)
Party	Candidate	Votes	%
Liberal Democrats	Calvin Horner	921	48.5
Liberal Democrats	Richard Townsend*	741	39.0
Independent	Colin Woodward	469	24.7
Conservative	Shane Manning	456	24.0
Labour	John Boyle	383	20.2
Conservative	Andy Van Loen	326	17.2
Green	Saffron Mackenzie	176	9.3
Turnout		1,898	39.7
Registered electors		4,781	
Liberal Democrats win (new seat)			
Liberal Democrats win (new seat)			

=== Bishop's Stortford South ===
Bishop's Stortford South (2 seats)
Party	Candidate	Votes	%
Liberal Democrats	Simon Marlow	480	38.0
Conservative	Diane Hollebon*	425	33.7
Labour	Oliver Diffey	412	32.6
Conservative	David Snowdon*	387	30.6
Labour	Alex Chapman	363	28.7
Green	Sally Millican	296	23.4
Turnout		1,263	34.4
Registered electors		3,672	
Liberal Democrats win (new seat)			
Conservative win (new seat)			

=== Bishop's Stortford Thorley Manor ===
Bishop's Stortford Thorley Manor (3 seats)
Party	Candidate	Votes	%
Labour	David Willcocks	1,094	45.0
Conservative	Graham McAndrew*	961	39.6
Conservative	John Wyllie*	932	38.4
Labour	Steve Smith	921	37.9
Conservative	Alastair Ward-Booth*	841	34.6
Green	Connie Deans-Harding	823	33.9
Green	Martyn Fenner	620	25.5
Turnout		2,429	34.3
Registered electors		7,082	
Labour win (new seat)			
Conservative win (new seat)			
Conservative win (new seat)			

=== Braughing & Standon ===
Braughing & Standon (2 seats)
Party	Candidate	Votes	%
Conservative	Stan Bull*	646	50.5
Conservative	Frankie Woolf	541	42.3
Green	John Howson	373	29.2
Labour	Frederick Perkins	372	29.1
Labour	Sam Honey	332	26.0
Turnout		1,279	27.8
Registered electors		4,601	
Conservative win (new seat)			
Conservative win (new seat)			

=== Buntingford ===
Buntingford (3 seats)
Party	Candidate	Votes	%	±%
Green	Vicky Burt	1,151	46.5	+13.3
Green	Sue Nicholls	1,055	42.6	N/A
Green	David Woollcombe	978	39.5	N/A
Conservative	Jeff Jones*	960	38.8	–17.8
Conservative	Andrew Huggins*	928	37.5	–13.2
Conservative	Martin Prescott	809	32.7	N/A
Labour	Stephen Wood	289	11.7	–6.6
Liberal Democrats	Karl Harrington	271	10.9	–10.9
Labour	Gill Perkins	260	10.5	N/A
Labour	David King	229	9.3	N/A
Turnout		2,475	33.2	+4.4
Registered electors		7,455		
Green gain from Conservative				
Green gain from Conservative				
Green win (new seat)				

=== Great Amwell & Stansteads ===
Great Amwell & Stansteads (2 seats)
Party	Candidate	Votes	%
Liberal Democrats	Joseph Dumont	553	42.3
Conservative	Peter Boylan*	472	36.1
Liberal Democrats	Joe Howlett	468	35.8
Conservative	Peter Moule	397	30.4
Labour	John Heighway	210	16.1
Green	Stuart Moore	169	12.9
Labour	Graham Watts	139	10.6
Turnout		1,306	29.4
Registered electors		4,442	
Liberal Democrats win (new seat)			
Conservative win (new seat)			

=== Hertford Bengeo ===
Hertford Bengeo (3 seats)
Party	Candidate	Votes	%	±%
Green	Ben Crystall*	1,878	67.0	+33.4
Green	Vicky Smith	1,578	56.3	+29.0
Green	Alex Daar	1,518	54.1	+34.0
Conservative	Sally Newton*	734	26.2	–14.8
Conservative	Cassandra Johnson	615	21.9	–30.9
Conservative	Isse Abdullah	587	20.9	–12.9
Labour	Fay Adams	416	14.8	–7.9
Labour	Joseph Chapman	280	10.0	–6.9
Labour	Alan Nadin	238	8.5	–7.9
Liberal Democrats	Carole Luck	156	5.6	–13.6
Turnout		2,805	42.6	+4.5
Registered electors		6,585		
Green hold				
Green gain from Conservative				
Green gain from Conservative				

=== Hertford Castle ===
Hertford Castle (2 seats)
Party	Candidate	Votes	%	±%
Green	Rachel Carter	601	34.9	+2.6
Green	Sarah Hopewell	561	32.5	+8.3
Conservative	Jan Goodeve*	560	32.5	–7.3
Labour	Josh Dean	550	31.9	+7.4
Conservative	Daniel Chichester-Miles	544	31.6	–7.4
Labour	Robert Pinkham	458	26.6	+3.5
Liberal Democrats	Freja Waterhouse	83	4.8	–16.0
Turnout		1,724	37.7	+7.5
Registered electors		4,573		
Green gain from Conservative				
Green gain from Conservative				

=== Hertford Heath & Brickendon ===
Hertford Heath & Brickendon
Party	Candidate	Votes	%
Green	Tim Hoskin	414	52.1
Conservative	Tony Roberts	275	34.6
Labour	Stephen Waller	74	9.3
Liberal Democrats	Nick Belfitt	32	4.0
Majority		139	17.5
Turnout		797	33.6
Registered electors		2,372	
Green win (new seat)			

=== Hertford Kingsmead ===
Hertford Kingsmead (3 seats)
Party	Candidate	Votes	%	±%
Green	Carl Brittain	851	38.5	+10.3
Green	Maura Connolly	782	35.4	N/A
Green	Vicky Glover-Ward	768	34.7	N/A
Conservative	Rosemary Bolton*	610	27.6	–15.7
Conservative	James Clark	491	22.2	–14.1
Conservative	Beverley Murray	488	22.1	N/A
Liberal Democrats	Elif Lewis	486	22.0	–5.4
Liberal Democrats	Andrew Porrer	458	20.7	–4.8
Liberal Democrats	Geoffrey Madge	377	17.0	N/A
Labour	Annie Farnley	366	16.5	–10.9
Labour	Rachel Houghton	353	16.0	N/A
Labour	Graham Nickson	331	15.0	N/A
Turnout		2,212	33.6	+4.7
Registered electors		6,583		
Green gain from Conservative				
Green gain from Conservative				
Green win (new seat)				

=== Hertford Rural ===
Hertford Rural
Party	Candidate	Votes	%
Conservative	Bob Deering*	474	53.3
Green	Tony Tarrega	175	19.7
Labour	Emma Waltham	130	14.6
Liberal Democrats	Catherine Edwards	110	12.4
Majority		299	33.6
Turnout		898	34.5
Registered electors		2,603	
Conservative win (new seat)			

=== Hertford Sele ===
Hertford Sele (2 seats)
Party	Candidate	Votes	%	±%
Labour	Thomas Clements	720	51.5	+7.1
Labour	Carolyn Redfern*	708	50.6	+6.5
Conservative	Mohummad Hossain	347	24.8	–6.4
Conservative	Andrew Turvey	336	24.0	–3.6
Green	Sophie Missenden	320	22.9	–9.7
Liberal Democrats	Philip Edwards	129	9.2	N/A
Turnout		1,399	32.2	+4.1
Registered electors		4,345		
Labour hold				
Labour hold				

=== Hunsdon ===
Hunsdon
Party	Candidate	Votes	%	±%
Green	John Dunlop	363	65.9	+18.9
Conservative	Salvatore Pagdades	90	16.3	–36.7
Labour	Hilary Durbin	50	9.1	N/A
Liberal Democrats	Julia Davies	48	8.7	N/A
Majority		273	49.6	N/A
Turnout		551	34.6	+8.3
Registered electors		1,593		
Green gain from Conservative		Swing	▲27.8	

=== Little Hadham & The Pelhams ===
Little Hadham & The Pelhams
Party	Candidate	Votes	%
Conservative	Geoffrey Williamson*	428	51.3
Liberal Democrats	Dave Bromage	230	24.5
Green	Felix Rennie	142	15.1
Labour	Jillian Nelmes	86	9.1
Majority		252	26.8
Turnout		895	36.4
Registered electors		2,459	
Conservative win (new seat)			

=== Much Hadham ===
Much Hadham
Party	Candidate	Votes	%	±%
Conservative	Ian Devonshire*	418	59.8	N/A
Labour	Dawn Newell	126	18.0	N/A
Green	Valerie Fenner	86	12.3	N/A
Liberal Democrats	Katharine Macy	69	9.9	N/A
Majority		292	41.8	N/A
Turnout		715	32.5	N/A
Registered electors		2,220		
Conservative hold		Swing	N/A	

=== Sawbridgeworth ===
Sawbridgeworth (3 seats)
Party	Candidate	Votes	%	±%
Conservative	Eric Buckmaster*	1,311	57.7	+17.0
Conservative	Ruth Buckmaster*	1,056	46.5	–7.8
Conservative	Angus Parsad-Wyatt	760	33.5	–7.0
Independent	Greg Rattey	667	29.4	N/A
Labour	Rob Furber	518	22.8	+11.3
Labour	Paul Newell	500	22.0	+12.6
Liberal Democrats	Timothy Macy	398	17.5	–17.9
Labour	Natasha Plowman	389	17.1	N/A
Green	Elizabeth Downes	383	16.9	N/A
Reform	John Burmicz*	218	9.6	N/A
Turnout		2,272	32.8	+2.8
Registered electors		6,799		
Conservative hold				
Conservative hold				
Conservative hold				

=== The Mundens ===
The Mundens
Party	Candidate	Votes	%
Conservative	Aubrey Holt	436	59.7
Green	Sarah Jupp	152	20.8
Labour	John Agar	142	19.5
Majority		284	38.9
Turnout		737	33.4
Registered electors		2,207	
Conservative win (new seat)			

=== Ware Priory ===
Ware Priory (2 seats)
Party	Candidate	Votes	%
Green	George Williams	892	48.2
Green	Graeme Hill	796	43.0
Conservative	Mark Pope*	498	26.9
Conservative	Jonathan Kaye*	495	26.8
Labour	Sarah Chapman	320	17.3
Labour	Jane Guinn	264	14.3
Liberal Democrats	Victoria Shaw	162	8.8
Liberal Democrats	Roger Wade	78	4.2
Turnout		1,850	34.0
Registered electors		5,441	
Green win (new seat)			
Green win (new seat)			

=== Ware Rural ===
Ware Rural
Party	Candidate	Votes	%
Conservative	David Andrews*	318	46.5
Green	Andrew Zsibrita	181	26.5
Labour	Suzie Langdon-Shreeve	108	15.8
Liberal Democrats	David Davies	77	11.3
Majority		137	20.0
Turnout		689	30.8
Registered electors		2,237	
Conservative win (new seat)			

=== Ware St Mary's ===
Ware St Mary's (2 seats)
Party	Candidate	Votes	%	±%
Green	Martin Butcher	973	56.1	+25.3
Green	Steven Watson	857	49.4	+26.9
Conservative	Phyllis Ballam	551	31.8	–16.5
Conservative	Rishi Fernando*	536	30.9	–10.6
Labour	Paul O'Neill	234	13.5	–2.8
Liberal Democrats	Tony Gubb	134	7.7	–9.0
Turnout		1,735	35.7	+8.0
Registered electors		4,860		
Green gain from Conservative				
Green gain from Conservative				

=== Ware Trinity ===
Ware Trinity (2 seats)
Party	Candidate	Votes	%	±%
Green	Chris Hart	797	60.6	+18.5
Green	Nick Cox	713	54.2	N/A
Conservative	Ian Kemp*	334	25.4	–10.7
Conservative	Benjamin Parker	237	18.0	–14.1
Labour	Richard Mowbray	176	13.4	–4.4
Liberal Democrats	Andrew Cropper	89	6.8	–23.1
Liberal Democrats	Sean Shaw	86	6.5	N/A
Turnout		1,315	30.0	+2.1
Registered electors		3,483		
Green hold				
Green gain from Conservative				

=== Watton-at-Stone ===
Watton-at-Stone
Party	Candidate	Votes	%	±%
Liberal Democrats	Joe Thomas	689	64.6	–6.3
Conservative	Jane Dodson	325	30.5	+1.4
Green	André Correira Dos Santos	53	5.0	N/A
Majority		364	34.1	–1.5
Turnout		1,071	40.3	–1.7
Registered electors		2,658		
Liberal Democrats hold		Swing	▼3.9	

== Changes 2023–2027 ==
- Martin Butcher, elected as a Green, left the East Herts Green group in October 2023 to sit as an independent.
- Chris Hart, elected as a Green, left the East Herts Green group in December 2023 to sit as an independent.
- Graham McAndrew, elected as a Conservative, joined Reform UK in March 2025.
- In May 2025, Reform UK gained Braughing & Standon from the Conservatives at a by-election.
- In May 2026, Jeff Jones retained Little Hadham & The Pelhams for the Conservatives at a by-election.

=== By-elections ===
==== Braughing & Standon ====
Braughing & Standon by-election: 1 May 2025
Party	Candidate	Votes	%	±%
Reform	Terry Smith	541	34.6	N/A
Conservative	Jane Dodson	484	31.0	–15.4
Green	James Taylor-Moran	307	19.6	–7.2
Labour	Joanna Linney	134	8.6	–18.1
Liberal Democrats	Freddie Jewitt	97	6.2	N/A
Majority		57	3.6	N/A
Turnout		1,571	33.2	+5.4
Registered electors		4,736		
Reform gain from Conservative				

The by-election was triggered by the resignation of Conservative councillor Frankie Woolf.

==== Little Hadham & The Pelhams ====
Little Hadham & The Pelhams by-election: 7 May 2026
Party	Candidate	Votes	%	±%
Conservative	Jeff Jones	469	36.5	N/A
Reform	Fraser Jones	359	28.0	N/A
Green	Rob Dawson	172	13.4	N/A
Labour	Pauline Mary Kellett	157	12.2	N/A
Liberal Democrats	Karl Ambrose Harrington	127	9.9	N/A
Majority		110	8.5	N/A
Turnout		1,285	52.9	N/A
Registered electors		2,430		
Conservative hold		Swing		

The by-election was triggered by the resignation of Conservative councillor Geoffrey Williamson.

==== Hertford Kingsmead ====
Hertford Kingsmead by-election: 22 October 2026 Resignation of Vicky Glover-Ward (Green)
Party	Candidate	Votes	%	±%
Conservative	Rosemary Bolton	575	35.3	+8.9
Green	Drew Waller-Downes	529	32.4	−4.4
Reform	Christopher Bush	253	15.5	N/A
Labour	Dawn Newell	164	10.1	−5.7
Liberal Democrats	Elif Lewis	110	6.7	−14.3
Majority		46	2.9	N/A
Turnout		1,631	24.8	−8.8
Registered electors				
Conservative gain from Green		Swing	▲6.7	
