= Chairman of East Hertfordshire District Council =

Ceremonial head of East Hertfordshire District Council

The Chairman of East Hertfordshire District Council is the ceremonial head of the council, first citizen of district and the chair of full council meetings. At full council meetings, the chairman must ensure the smooth running of meetings, uphold the constitution, interpret the rules of procedure and maintain an 'apolitical stance.' The chairman may, though, exercise a casting vote in the case of a tied vote with 'complete freedom of conscience.' The chairman is forbidden by the constitution from being a member of the council's executive. The chairman is elected annually by council.

Since the start of the 2008 municipal year, chairmen have served only a single consecutive one-year term instead of the two or three year terms of office previously common. However, Jonathan Kaye served two consecutive terms in 2019-21 due to the special circumstances caused by the COVID pandemic.

Previous chairmen of the council are commemorated on boards in the council chamber of East Herts Council at Wallfields, Pegs Lane, Hertford.

Municipal Years In Office	Chairman	Ward Represented	Notes
2022-2023	Ian Devonshire	Much Hadham	
2021-2022	Ken Crofton	Walkern	First person to serve two non-consecutive terms as chairman.
2019-2021	Jonathan Kaye	Ware Christchurch	Served two consecutive one year terms due to the special circumstances caused by the COVID-19 pandemic.
2018-2019	Keith Warnell	Bishop's Stortford Meads	
2017-2018	Jeff Jones	Buntingford	
2016-2017	Ken Crofton	Walkern	
2015-2016	Patricia Moore	Hertford Bengeo	
2014-2015	Roger Beeching	Sawbridgeworth	
2013-2014	Graham McAndrew	Bishop's Stortford South	
2012-2013	Jeanette Taylor	Ware St Mary's	
2011-2012	Suzanne Rutland-Barsby	Hertford Castle	
2010-2011	Tony Dodd	Ware Trinity	
2009-2010	Stan Bull	Buntingford	
2008-2009	Diane Hollebon	Bishop's Stortford South	
2006-2008	Allen Burlton	Bishop's Stortford South	
2004-2006	Derek Mayes	Great Amwell	
2002-2004	Nigel Copping	Stansted Abbots	
2000-2002	Ralph Gilbert	Bishop's Stortford Meads	
1998-2000	Robert Parker	Bishop's Stortford Thorley (1998–1999), Bishop's Stortford South (1999–2000)	
1997-1998	Jill Geall	Tewin	
1996-1997	James Ranger	Cottered	
1994-1996	Nigel Poulton	Watton At Stone	
1992-1994	Roger Tucker	Stapleford	
1990-1992	Roger Martin	Hertford Bengeo	
1988-1990	Peter Ruffles	Hertford Castle	
1985-1988	Francis Clay	Sawbridgeworth	
1982-1985	Norman Murphy	Ware Priory	
1980-1982	Frederick Whitehead	Sawbridgeworth	
1978-1980	John Forrester	Hertford All Saints (1978–1979), Hertford Kingsmead (1979–1980)	
1975-1978	William Stripling	Sawbridgeworth	
1973-1975	Lilian Lloyd Taylor	Little Hadham	

== See also ==
- East Hertfordshire District Council
