= Hertford and Stevenage =

UK Parliament constituency (1974–1983)

- Former county constituency for the House of Commons
- Hertford and Stevenage in Hertfordshire, showing boundaries used from 1974-1983

February 1974–1983
- Seats: One
- Created from: Hertford, Hitchin and Hertfordshire East
- Replaced by: Stevenage, Hertford & Stortford and Broxbourne

Hertford and Stevenage was a parliamentary constituency in Hertfordshire, which returned one Member of Parliament (MP) to the House of Commons of the Parliament of the United Kingdom from February 1974 until it was abolished for the 1983 general election.

== History ==
The constituency was formed for the February 1974 general election as a result of the recommendations of the Second Periodic Review of Westminster constituencies following the rapid rise in the population of the new town of Stevenage, which had previously been part of the Hitchin constituency.

The former Labour MP for Hitchin, Shirley Williams, stood successfully for the seat in both 1974 elections. She held it when she was a Secretary of State in government from 1974 until 1979, Secretary of State for Prices and Consumer Protection and then Paymaster General, before being defeated at the 1979 election by Bowen Wells of the Conservative Party. Williams was later one of the "Gang of Four" rebels who founded the Social Democratic Party (SDP) in 1981.

The constituency was abolished at the Third Periodic Review when Stevenage was made a constituency in its own right.

== Boundaries ==
- The Municipal Borough of Hertford;
- The Urban Districts of Stevenage and Ware; and
- The Rural District of Hertford.

Hertford and its rural district had previously been in the Hertford constituency, Stevenage in Hitchin and Ware in Hertfordshire East. After being used for only three general elections, a further round of boundary changes in 1983 saw Hertford and Stevenage abolished, with Hertford and Ware joining Bishop's Stortford in Hertford and Stortford while the remainder of the seat formed the basis of the new Stevenage constituency.

== Members of Parliament ==
Election	Member	Party	Notes
Feb 1974	Shirley Williams	Labour	Member for Hitchin (1964–1974)
1979	Bowen Wells	Conservative	Contested Hertford and Stortford following redistribution
1983	constituency abolished: see Stevenage and Hertford and Stortford		

== Elections ==
General election 1979: Hertford and Stevenage
Party	Candidate	Votes	%	±%
Conservative	Bowen Wells	31,739	45.1	+12.4
Labour	Shirley Williams	30,443	43.2	−3.9
Liberal	B Rigby	7,660	10.9	−7.3
National Front	J Pell	581	0.8	−1.1
Majority		1,296	1.8	N/A
Turnout		70,423	80.4	+4.1
Registered electors		87,623		
Conservative gain from Labour		Swing	+8.1	

General election October 1974: Hertford and Stevenage
Party	Candidate	Votes	%	±%
Labour	Shirley Williams	29,548	47.1	+2.5
Conservative	Vivian Bendall	20,502	32.7	+0.1
Liberal	TN Willis	11,419	18.2	−4.5
National Front	K Taylor	1,232	2.0	New
Majority		9,046	14.4	+2.4
Turnout		62,701	76.3	−7.3
Registered electors		82,218		
Labour hold		Swing	+1.2	

General election February 1974: Hertford and Stevenage
Party	Candidate	Votes	%	±%
Labour	Shirley Williams	30,343	44.7	–5.6
Conservative	Vivian Bendall	22,167	32.6	–9.2
Liberal	TN Willis	15,444	22.7	+14.5
Majority		8,176	12.0	+3.9
Turnout		67,954	83.6	+6.2
Registered electors		81,301		
Labour hold		Swing	+2.0	

1970 notional result
Party	Vote	%
Labour	28,400	49.9
Conservative	23,800	41.8
Liberal	4,700	8.3
Turnout	56,900	77.4
Electorate	73,508	
