= Minister of State for Employment =

British government minister

United Kingdom Minister of State for Employment
- Royal Arms of His Majesty's Government

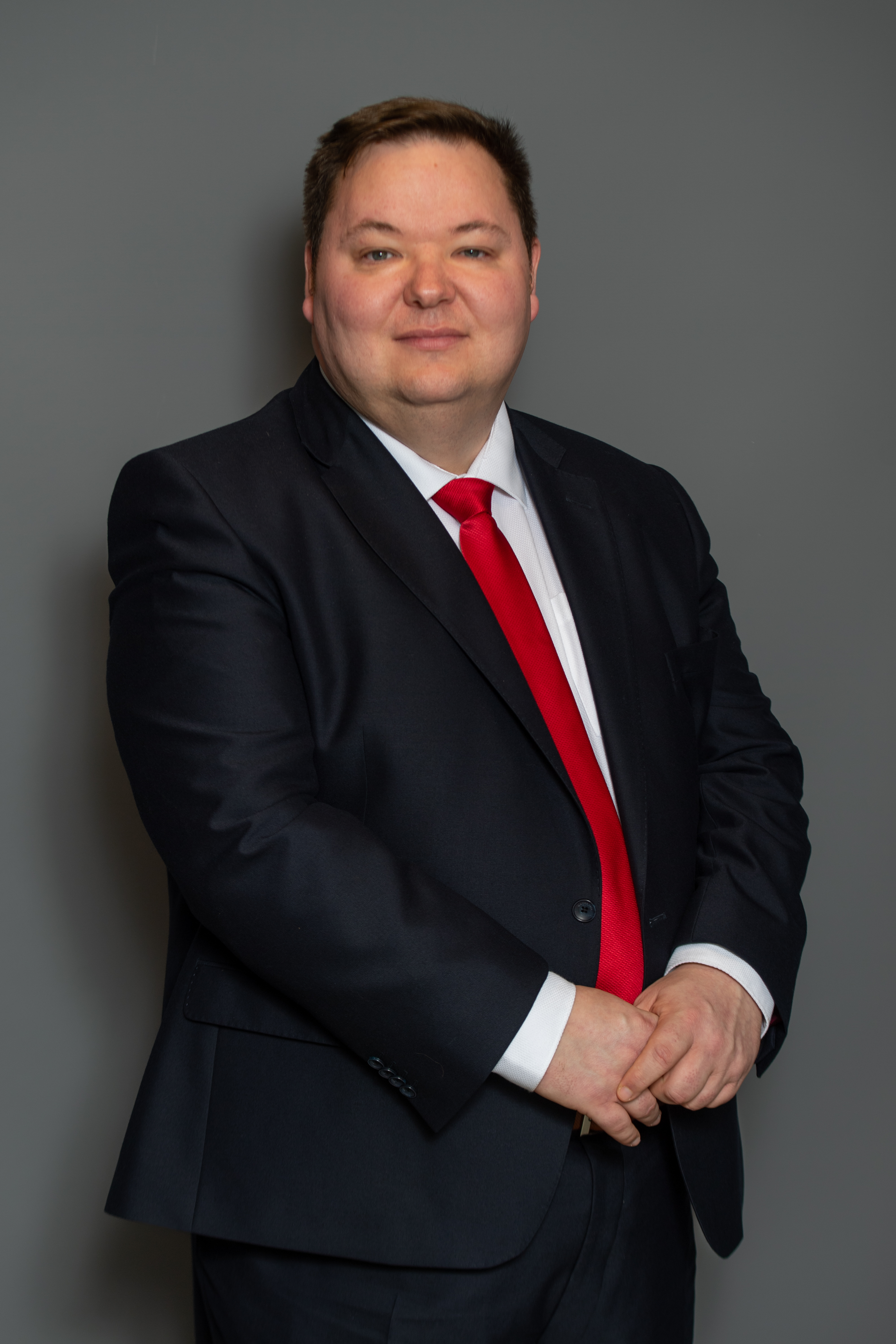
- Incumbent; Andrew Western since 21 July 2026
- Department for Work and Pensions
- Style: Minister
- Nominator: Prime Minister of the United Kingdom
- Appointer: The Monarch; on advice of the Prime Minister
- Term length: At His Majesty's pleasure
- Website: www.gov.uk/dwp

The Minister of State for Employment is a mid-level position in the Department for Work and Pensions in the British government.

== History ==
The office is currently awaiting appointment.

== Responsibilities ==
The minister's responsibilities include:

- Labour Market, including employer engagement and the impact of AI
- Jobs and Careers Service reform, including digital reform, Jobcentre Plus and post-19 careers
- Work and Health: Occupational Health and Statutory Sick Pay
- Employment support (incl. Restart, Pathways to Work)
- Conditionality and Sanctions
- In Work Progression
- Devolution
- Disability Employment

== List of Employment Ministers ==
Name	Portrait	Entered office	Left office	Political party	Prime Minister
Minister of State for Employment
Albert Booth		8 March 1976	1979	Labour	James Callaghan
Harold Walker		14 April 1976	1979	Labour	James Callaghan
Parliamentary Under-Secretary of State for Employment
John Fraser		8 March 1974	14 April 1976	Labour	Harold Wilson
Harold Walker		8 March 1974	14 April 1976	Labour	Harold Wilson
John Golding		14 April 1976	4 May 1979	Labour	James Callaghan
John Grant		14 April 1976	4 May 1979	Labour	James Callaghan
Jim Lester		7 May 1979	5 January 1981	Conservative	Margaret Thatcher
Patrick Mayhew		7 May 1979	5 January 1981	Conservative	Margaret Thatcher
David Waddington		5 January 1981	6 January 1983	Conservative	Margaret Thatcher
Peter Morrison		5 January 1981	13 June 1983	Conservative	Margaret Thatcher
John Gummer		6 January 1983	18 October 1983	Conservative	Margaret Thatcher
Alan Clark		13 June 1983	24 January 1986	Conservative	Margaret Thatcher
Peter Bottomley		11 September 1984	23 January 1986	Conservative	Margaret Thatcher
David Trippier		2 September 1985	13 June 1987	Conservative	Margaret Thatcher
Ian Lang		31 January 1986	10 September 1986	Conservative	Margaret Thatcher
John Lee		10 September 1986	26 July 1989	Conservative	Margaret Thatcher
Patrick Nicholls		13 June 1987	24 July 1990	Conservative	Margaret Thatcher
Thomas Galbraith, 2nd Baron Strathclyde		26 July 1989	24 July 1990	Conservative	Margaret Thatcher
Robert Jackson		24 July 1990	14 April 1992	Conservative	Margaret Thatcher and John Major
Eric Forth		24 July 1990	14 April 1992	Conservative	Margaret Thatcher and John Major
Nicholas Lowther, 2nd Viscount Ullswater		24 July 1990	16 September 1993	Conservative	Margaret Thatcher and John Major
Patrick McLoughlin		14 April 1992	27 May 1993	Conservative	John Major
Ann Widdecombe		27 May 1993	20 July 1994	Conservative	John Major
Oliver Eden, 8th Baron Henley		16 September 1993	20 July 1994	Conservative	John Major
James Paice		20 July 1994	5 July 1995	Conservative	John Major
Phillip Oppenheim		20 July 1994	5 July 1995	Conservative	John Major
Minister of State for Work
Nick Brown		11 June 2001	13 June 2003	Labour	Tony Blair
Des Browne		13 June 2003	1 April 2004	Labour	Tony Blair
Jane Kennedy		1 April 2004	10 May 2005	Labour	Tony Blair
Margaret Hodge		10 May 2005	5 May 2006	Labour	Tony Blair
Minister of State for Employment and Welfare Reform
Jim Murphy		5 May 2006	28 June 2007	Labour	Tony Blair
Caroline Flint		28 June 2007	24 January 2008	Labour	Gordon Brown
Minister of State for Employment
Stephen Timms		25 January 2008	3 October 2008	Labour	Gordon Brown
Minister of State for Employment and Welfare Reform
Tony McNulty		3 October 2008	5 June 2009	Labour	Gordon Brown
Jim Knight		5 June 2009	11 May 2010	Labour	Gordon Brown
Minister of State for Employment
Chris Grayling		13 May 2010	4 September 2012	Conservative	David Cameron
Mark Hoban		4 September 2012	7 October 2013	Conservative	David Cameron
Esther McVey		7 October 2013	8 May 2015	Conservative	David Cameron
Priti Patel		11 May 2015	14 July 2016	Conservative	David Cameron
Damian Hinds		17 July 2016	8 January 2018	Conservative	Theresa May
Alok Sharma		9 January 2018	24 July 2019	Conservative	Theresa May
Parliamentary Under-Secretary of State for Employment
Mims Davies		25 July 2019	6 July 2022	Conservative	Boris Johnson
Julie Marson		8 July 2022	20 September 2022	Conservative	Boris Johnson
Minister of State for Work and Welfare
Victoria Prentis		7 September 2022	25 October 2022	Conservative	Liz Truss
Minister of State for Employment
Guy Opperman		26 October 2022	13 November 2023	Conservative	Rishi Sunak
Jo Churchill		13 November 2023	5 July 2024	Conservative	Rishi Sunak
Alison McGovern		8 July 2024	6 September 2025	Labour	Keir Starmer
Diana Johnson		6 September 2025	21 July 2026	Labour	Keir Starmer
Andrew Western		21 July 2026	Incumbent	Labour	Andy Burnham
