= Josh Dean (politician) =

British politician

Josh Dean MP
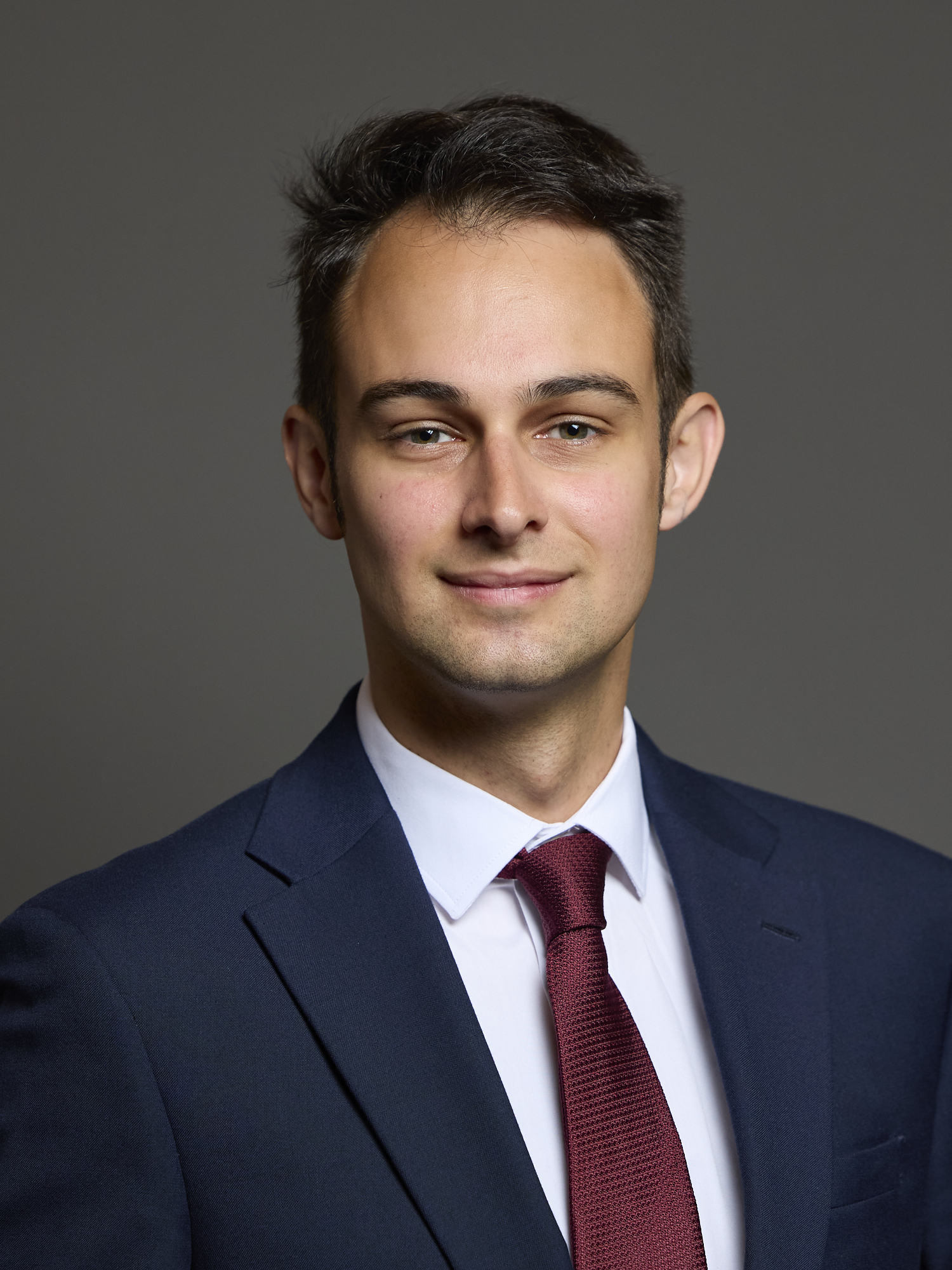
- Official portrait, 2024

Member of Parliament for Hertford and Stortford
- Incumbent
- Assumed office 4 July 2024
- Preceded by: Julie Marson
- Majority: 4,748 (8.8%)

Hertford Town Councillor for Castle
- In office 4 May 2023 – 4 July 2024

Personal details
- Born: Joshua Robert Abraham Dean; 1999 or 2000 (age 26–27)
- Party: Labour
- Domestic partner: Issy
- Education: Richard Hale School
- Alma mater: University of Westminster (BA)
- Website: www.joshdean.co.uk

Joshua Robert Abraham Dean (born 1999 or 2000) is a British Labour Party politician who has been Member of Parliament (MP) for Hertford and Stortford since 2024. Before becoming an MP, he was elected as a Councillor for Hertford Town Council in the 2023 United Kingdom local elections.

== Early life and education ==
Dean attended Richard Hale School, leaving 'directionless' at 17. He then worked, including at his local Starbucks, for a number of years, and was still living at his mother's home when elected. In 2020, he founded "Stortford Against Rhodes", which was successful in its campaign to rename Rhodes Birthplace Trust, in the wake of the Black Lives Matter movement. On becoming an MP, he was a student at the University of Westminster, studying Politics and International Relations, needing to finish his dissertation before he could graduate.

Dean stood in the 2019 and 2023 East Hertforshire District Council elections, losing both times.

== Parliamentary career ==
Dean was elected as MP for Hertford and Stortford at the 2024 general election held in July 2024 with a majority of 4,748.

Parliament of the United Kingdom
Preceded by Julie Marson	Member of Parliament for Hertford and Stortford; 2024–present	Incumbent
