= 2011 Thanet District Council election =

2011 UK local government election

Results by ward.

Elections to elect all members (councillors) of Thanet District Council were held on 5 May 2011, as part of the 2011 United Kingdom local elections taking place simultaneously with the Alternative Vote Referendum. No political party won an overall majority of seats, meaning that the council went into 'No Overall Control' status for the first time since 1991. The Conservative Party ran a minority administration until December of that year, when a Conservative councillor defected to the Independents group, enabling The Labour Party to run a minority administration until 2015. The District has as its main towns the beach resort towns of Ramsgate, Margate and Broadstairs.

== Overall results ==
After the election, the composition of the council is:

Party	Votes	%	+/–	Seats	+/–
Conservative Party	40,813	46.58		27	▼6
Labour Party	33,498	38.24		26	▲7
Liberal Democrats	2,302	2.63		0	
UK Independence Party	1,673	1.91		0	
Ramsgate First	519	0.59		0	▼1
Green Party	283	0.32		0	
Independent(s)	8,522	9.73		3	
Total	87,610	100.00	0	56	0
Valid ballots cast	39,318	98.60			
Invalid/blank ballots cast	559	1.40			
Total ballots cast	39,877	100.00			
Registered voters/turnout	93,589	42.61			
Source: BBC

== Results by ward ==
Listed below are the results in each of the 26 wards of Thanet District Council. Each ward elects 2 or 3 councilors, with the exception of Kingsgate ward, which only elects one member.

=== Beacon Road ===
Beacon Road (2 seats)
Party	Candidate	Votes	%	±%
Labour	Jenny Matterface	703	27	
Conservative	Rosalind Binks	672	25	
Labour	Gordon John Edwards	670	25	
Conservative	David Macdonald Lawson	591	22	
Majority		2	0.07	
Turnout		2636	44	
Labour gain from Conservative		Swing		
Conservative hold		Swing		

=== Birchington North ===
Birchington North (2 seats)
Party	Candidate	Votes	%	±%
Conservative	Simon Day	835	29	
Conservative	Keith Coleman-Cooke	787	27	
Independent	Ash Ashbee	552	19	
Labour	Jodie Sharon Hibbert	228	8	
Liberal Democrats	Sue Granata	210	7	
Independent	Bernard Anthony La Roche	201	7	
Liberal Democrats	Seth Proctor	87	3	
Majority		235	8.10	
Turnout		2900	53	
Conservative hold		Swing		
Conservative hold		Swing		

=== Birchington South ===
Birchington South (3 seats)
Party	Candidate	Votes	%	±%
Conservative	John Worrow	1171	23	
Conservative	Alasdair Bruce	1079	21	
Independent	Jack Bernard Cohen	1023	20	
Conservative	Jo Roberts	900	18	
Labour	Hannah Rose Scobie	499	10	
Labour	Rebecca Jayne Scobie	433	8	
Majority		123	2.41	
Turnout		5105	46	
Conservative hold		Swing		
Conservative hold		Swing		
Independent gain from Conservative		Swing		

=== Bradstowe ===
Bradstowe (2 seats)
Party	Candidate	Votes	%	±%
Conservative	David Saunders	832	29	
Conservative	Bill Hayton	781	27	
Liberal Democrats	Louisa June Rachel Latham	412	14	
Labour	Brian Yeoman	372	13	
Liberal Democrats	Clare Alison Hunt	279	10	
Independent	Robin Peter Vaughan-Lyons	211	7	
Majority		369	12.78	
Turnout		2887	50	
Conservative hold		Swing		
Conservative hold		Swing		

=== Central Harbour ===
Central Harbour (3 seats)
Party	Candidate	Votes	%	±%
Labour	Peter Campbell	859	15	
Labour	Mary Dwyer	743	13	
Labour	Corinna Huxley	729	13	
Independent	Ralph Christopher Hoult	630	11	
Conservative	Sandy Spicer	554	10	
Conservative	Mike Taylor	517	9	
Independent	Frank Batt	485	8	
Conservative	Saul Huggins	440	8	
Independent	Angela Cousins	435	8	
UKIP	Trev Shonk	335	6	
Majority		99	1.73	
Turnout		5727	39	
Labour hold		Swing		
Labour hold		Swing		
Labour gain from Ramsgate First		Swing		

=== Cliffsend and Pegwell ===
Cliffsend and Pegwell (2 seats)
Party	Candidate	Votes	%	±%
Conservative	John Derek Kirby	966	31	
Conservative	Jo Gideon	859	27	
Labour	Steve Ward	502	16	
Independent	Brian Urwin	439	14	
Labour	Peter Wharmby	384	12	
Majority		357	11.33	
Turnout		3150	49	
Conservative hold		Swing		
Conservative hold		Swing		

=== Cliftonville East ===
Cliftonville East (3 seats)
Party	Candidate	Votes	%	±%
Conservative	Sandy Ezekiel	1187	18	
Conservative	Martin Wise	1165	18	
Conservative	Brian Sullivan	1155	18	
Independent	William Friend	601	9	
Independent	Louise Friend	598	9	
Labour	Elizabeth Poole	515	8	
Labour	Margaret Symonds	490	8	
Labour	Matthew Rowland Poole	456	7	
Green	Timothy Peter Patrick Spencer	283	4	
Majority		554	8.59	
Turnout		6450	49	
Conservative hold		Swing		
Conservative hold		Swing		
Conservative hold		Swing		

=== Cliftonville West ===
Cliftonville West (3 seats)
Party	Candidate	Votes	%	±%
Labour	Clive Hart	875	21	
Labour	Douglas Clark	822	20	
Labour	Linda Aldred	800	19	
Conservative	Bert McCastree	588	14	
Conservative	Henry James Martell	567	14	
Conservative	John Rothman	525	13	
Majority		212	5.08	
Turnout		4177	35	
Labour hold		Swing		
Labour hold		Swing		
Labour hold		Swing		

=== Dane Valley ===
Dane Valley (3 seats)
Party	Candidate	Votes	%	±%
Labour	Sandra Jean Hart	921	19	
Labour	John Martin Edwards	863	18	
Labour	Will Scobie	818	17	
Conservative	Wendy Allan	582	12	
Conservative	Michael Jarvis	479	10	
Conservative	David Wallin	431	9	
Liberal Democrats	Matthew David Brown	289	6	
Liberal Democrats	Tony Flaig	278	6	
Liberal Democrats	Bill Furness	243	5	
Majority		236	4.81	
Turnout		4904	35	
Labour gain from Conservative		Swing		
Labour gain from Conservative		Swing		
Labour gain from Conservative		Swing		

=== Eastcliff ===
Eastcliff (3 seats)
Party	Candidate	Votes	%	±%
Labour	David Green	767	18	
Labour	Rick Everitt	651	15	
Labour	Pat Moore	622	15	
Ramsgate First	Gerry O'Donnell	519	12	
Conservative	Eric Easton	457	11	
Conservative	John Holmes	404	10	
Conservative	David Barrie Spicer	372	9	
Independent	Jane Ann Roscow	226	5	
Independent	Les Shonk	224	5	
Majority		103	2.43	
Turnout		4242	35	
Labour hold		Swing		
Labour hold		Swing		
Labour hold		Swing		

=== Garlinge ===
Garlinge (2 seats)
Party	Candidate	Votes	%	±%
Conservative	Shirley Timlinson	482	21	
Conservative	Ken Gregory	440	19	
Labour	Beth Caroline Denning	415	18	
Labour	Colin James Harvey	403	17	
Independent	Roy Douglas Ovenden	312	13	
UKIP	David John Greely	266	11	
Majority		25	1.08	
Turnout		2318	40	
Conservative hold		Swing		
Conservative hold		Swing		

=== Kingsgate ===
Kingsgate (1 seat)
Party	Candidate	Votes	%	±%
Conservative	Robert William Bayford	518	65	
Labour	Nigel Utton	171	21	
UKIP	Alan Terry	107	13	
Majority		347	43.59	
Turnout		796	46	
Conservative hold		Swing		

=== Margate Central ===
Margate Central (2 seats)
Party	Candidate	Votes	%	±%
Labour	Iris Johnston	682	39	
Labour	John Terence Charles Watkins	570	32	
Conservative	Matthew Clements	283	16	
Conservative	Glenn Coleman-Cooke	235	13	
Majority		287	16.21	
Turnout		1770	34	
Labour hold		Swing		
Labour hold		Swing		

=== Nethercourt ===
Nethercourt (2 seats)
Party	Candidate	Votes	%	±%
Labour	Steven Alexandrou	669	24	
Labour	Kim Gibson	628	22	
Conservative	Jill Marion Kirby	600	21	
Conservative	Brenda Marilyn Rogers	562	20	
UKIP	Sarah Larkins	188	7	
UKIP	Maggie Carter	166	6	
Majority		28	1.00	
Turnout		2813	44	
Labour gain from Conservative		Swing		
Labour gain from Conservative		Swing		

=== Newington ===
Newington (2 seats)
Party	Candidate	Votes	%	±%
Labour	Mike Harrison	705	33	
Labour	Richard Russell Nicholson	702	33	
Conservative	Wynnette Joyce Marsh	370	17	
Conservative	Phil Simpson	351	16	
Majority		332	15.60	
Turnout		2128	36	
Labour hold		Swing		
Labour hold		Swing		

=== Northwood ===
Northwood (3 seats)
Party	Candidate	Votes	%	±%
Labour	Kay Dark	971	20	
Labour	Elizabeth Green	951	20	
Labour	Ian Driver	877	18	
Conservative	Barbara Byne	726	14	
Conservative	Jenny Hudson	658	14	
Conservative	Mark Mulvihill	616	13	
Majority		151	3.15	
Turnout		4799	38	
Labour hold		Swing		
Labour hold		Swing		
Labour hold		Swing		

=== Salmestone ===
Salmestone (2 seats)
Party	Candidate	Votes	%	±%
Labour	Harry William Scobie	579	26	
Labour	Ela Lodge-Pritchard	557	25	
Conservative	Ingrid Spencer	417	19	
Conservative	Payam Tamiz	312	14	
UKIP	Jeffrey Elenor	165	8	
UKIP	Andy Jardine	163	7	
Majority		140	6.38	
Turnout		2193	34	
Labour hold		Swing		
Labour hold		Swing		

=== Sir Moses Montefiore ===
Sir Moses Montefiore (2 seats)
Party	Candidate	Votes	%	±%
Labour	Michelle Fenner	872	31	
Labour	Alan Poole	858	31	
Conservative	Gillian Elizabeth Todd	541	19	
Conservative	Vic Todd	514	18	
Majority		317	11.38	
Turnout		2785	42	
Labour hold		Swing		
Labour hold		Swing		

=== St Peters ===
St Peters (3 seats)
Party	Candidate	Votes	%	±%
Conservative	Ian James Gregory	1385	21	
Conservative	Zita Pauline Wiltshire	1330	20	
Conservative	Jason Savage	1329	20	
Labour	Wendy Perfect	869	13	
Labour	Dick Symonds	861	13	
Labour	Emma Poole	853	13	
Majority		460	6.94	
Turnout		6627	44	
Conservative hold		Swing		
Conservative hold		Swing		
Conservative hold		Swing		

=== Thanet Villages ===
Thanet Villages (3 seats)
Party	Candidate	Votes	%	±%
Independent	Bob Grove	1209	23	
Conservative	Mike Roberts	1011	19	
Conservative	Linda Wright	837	16	
Conservative	Karen Sullivan	720	14	
Independent	Ken Read	523	10	
Labour	Andrew Stephen Bean	516	10	
Labour	Serena Bean	472	9	
Majority		117	2.21	
Turnout		5288	47	
Independent hold		Swing		
Conservative hold		Swing		
Conservative hold		Swing		

=== Viking ===
Viking (3 seats)
Party	Candidate	Votes	%	±%
Conservative	Mave Saunders	1487	22	
Conservative	Chris Wells	1352	20	
Conservative	Julie Marson	1321	19	
Labour	Colin Kemp	777	11	
Labour	Bill Pitt	733	11	
Labour	Stephen Perfect	649	10	
Liberal Democrats	Margaret Anne Branscombe-Kent	504	7	
Majority		544	7.97	
Turnout		6823	48	
Conservative hold		Swing		
Conservative hold		Swing		
Conservative hold		Swing		

=== Westbrook ===
Westbrook (2 seats)
Party	Candidate	Votes	%	±%
Conservative	Neil Hornus	704	30	
Conservative	Mick Tomlinson	697	30	
Labour	Kerry Harker	459	20	
Labour	Louise Mary Frances Drelaud	450	19	
Majority		238	10.30	
Turnout		2310	42	
Conservative gain from Independent		Swing		
Conservative hold		Swing		

=== Westgate-on-Sea ===
Westgate-on-Sea (3 seats)
Party	Candidate	Votes	%	±%
Independent	Thomas George King	853	17	
Conservative	Simon Moores	793	16	
Conservative	Brian Goodwin	751	15	
Conservative	Richard Chapman	675	14	
Labour	David Michael Bull	555	11	
Labour	Lynda Diane Robinson	528	11	
Labour	Meg Harvey	444	9	
UKIP	Rosamund Mary Parker	283	6	
Majority		76	1.56	
Turnout		4882	42	
Independent hold		Swing		
Conservative hold		Swing		
Conservative hold		Swing		
