= 2015 Thanet District Council election =

2015 UK local government election

- 7 May 2015

All 56 seats on Thanet District Council 29 seats needed for a majority
- Turnout: 71.93% (▲29.32 pp)
	First party	Second party	Third party
	UKI	Con	Lab
Party	UKIP	Conservative	Labour
Last election	0 seats, 1.91%	27 seats, 46.58%	26 seats, 38.24%
Seats won	33	18	4
Seat change	▲33	▼9	▼22
Popular vote	54,230	46,382	35,553
Percentage	36.35%	31.09%	23.83%
Swing	▲34.44 pp	▼15.49 pp	▼14.41 pp
- Map showing the election results.
Council control before election
No overall control
Council control after election
UKIP

The 2015 Thanet District Council election was held on 7 May 2015 to elect all 56 seats on Thanet District Council, as part of the 2015 United Kingdom local elections taking place simultaneously with the 2015 General Election. The UK Independence Party won control of the council, becoming the governing group, the first time UKIP had won control of any type of local government unit above the level of a civil parish council, whether London Borough, Metropolitan Borough, Unitary Authority, Non-Metropolitan Borough or a District Council.

== Overall results ==
After the election the composition of the council was:

Party	Votes	%	+/–	Seats	+/–
UK Independence Party	54,230	36.35	▲34.44	33	▲33
Conservative Party	46,382	31.09	▼15.49	18	▼9
Labour Party	35,553	23.83	▼14.41	4	▼22
Green Party	3,708	2.49	▲2.17	0	Steady
Liberal Democrats	1,730	1.16	▼1.47	0	Steady
We are the Reality Party	857	0.57	New	0	New
Thanet Independent Group	581	0.39	New	0	New
Ramsgate First	199	0.13	▼0.46	0	Steady
Independent(s)	5,958	3.99	▼5.74	1	▼2
Total	149,198	100.00		56	
Valid ballots cast	67,339	99.23			
Invalid/blank ballots cast	522	0.77			
Total ballots cast	67,861	100.00			
Registered voters/turnout	94,343	71.93			
Source: BBC

↓
33	18	5
UKIP	Conservative	Other

== Results by ward ==
Listed below are the results in each of the 23 wards of Thanet District Council. Each ward elects 2 or 3 councilors, with the exception of Kingsgate ward, which only elects one member.

=== Beacon Road ===
Beacon Road (2 seats)
Party	Candidate	Votes	%	±%
UKIP	John Buckley	759	17.96	
Labour	Jenny Matterface	747	17.68	
Conservative	Rosalind Binks	729	17.25	
Conservative	Roger Binks	713	16.87	
Labour	Gordon Edwards	619	14.65	
UKIP	Sam Osmond	563	13.32	
We Are The Reality Party	Debra Holden	95	2.24	
Majority		18	0.43	
Turnout		4225	72.60	
UKIP gain from Conservative		Swing		
Labour hold		Swing		

=== Birchington North ===
Birchington North (2 seats)
Party	Candidate	Votes	%	±%
Conservative	Keith Coleman-Cooke	1096	24.16	
Conservative	Simon Day	1071	23.61	
UKIP	Roger Latchford	840	18.52	
UKIP	Ingrid Spencer	610	13.45	
Labour	Jacqueline Dunn	330	7.27	
Labour	Jonathon Mileman	254	5.60	
Liberal Democrats	Bill Furness	171	3.77	
Independent	Pat Duncan	163	3.59	
Majority		231	5.09	
Turnout		4535	80.60	
Conservative hold		Swing		
Conservative hold		Swing		

=== Birchington South ===
Birchington South (3 seats)
Party	Candidate	Votes	%	±%
UKIP	Suzanne Brimm	1348	13.39	
UKIP	Glenn Coleman-Cooke	1277	12.68	
UKIP	Alan Howes	1273	12.64	
Conservative	Liz Hurst	1091	10.84	
Conservative	Kerry Boyd	1056	10.49	
Conservative	Guy Wilson	923	9.17	
Independent	Neville Hudson	767	7.62	
Thanet Independent Group	Jack Cohen	581	5.77	
Labour	Rebecca Holmes	520	5.16	
Labour	Hannah Scobie	518	5.14	
Independent	Michael Grantham	302	3.00	
Liberal Democrats	Robert Wright	221	2.19	
Liberal Democrats	Alison Higginson	187	1.85	
Majority		182	1.80	
Turnout		10064	74.32	
UKIP gain from Conservative		Swing		
UKIP gain from Conservative		Swing		
UKIP gain from Independent		Swing		

=== Bradstowe ===
Bradstowe (2 seats)
Party	Candidate	Votes	%	±%
Conservative	Bill Hayton	1002	22.74	
Conservative	David Parsons	893	20.27	
UKIP	Peter Hogman	727	16.50	
Labour	Jemima Brown	600	13.62	
UKIP	George Rusiecki	579	13.14	
Labour	Sheila Matthews	500	11.35	
Independent	Bayo Oyediran	104	2.36	
Majority		109	3.77	
Turnout		4405	77.42	
Conservative hold		Swing		
Conservative hold		Swing		

=== Central Harbour ===
Central Harbour (3 seats)
Party	Candidate	Votes	%	±%
UKIP	Trevor Shonk	1123	11.22	
Labour	Peter Campbell	1059	10.58	
UKIP	Beverly Martin	1012	10.11	
UKIP	Christine Gull	1003	10.02	
Labour	Raushan Rahman	915	9.14	
Labour	Corinna Huxley	905	9.04	
Conservative	David Spicer	727	7.26	
Conservative	James Thomas	701	7.00	
Conservative	Mark Mulvihill	634	6.33	
Independent	Ralph Hoult	513	5.12	
Green	Kevin Pressland	486	4.85	
Green	Michael White	427	4.26	
We Are The Reality Party	Suzanne French	304	3.03	
Ramsgate First	Angela Cousins	199	1.98	
Majority		9	0.09	
Turnout		10008	70.32	
UKIP gain from Labour		Swing		
Labour hold		Swing		
UKIP gain from Labour		Swing		

=== Cliffsend and Pegwell ===
Cliffsend and Pegwell (2 seats)
Party	Candidate	Votes	%	±%
Conservative	Brenda Marilyn Rogers	1109	22.07	
UKIP	John Townend	951	18.93	
UKIP	Ted Bennett	919	18.29	
Conservative	Tony Trevor Mills	895	17.81	
Labour	Penny Newman	475	9.45	
Labour	James Edward Young	398	7.92	
Green	Tim Spencer	196	3.90	
We Are The Reality Party	Nigel Askew	82	1.63	
Majority		32	0.64	
Turnout		5025	80.07	
UKIP gain from Conservative		Swing		
Conservative hold		Swing		

=== Cliftonville East ===
Cliftonville East (3 seats)
Party	Candidate	Votes	%	±%
UKIP	Edward Jaye-Jones	1531	15.04	
UKIP	Chris Wells	1354	13.30	
Conservative	Lesley Ann Game	1349	13.25	
UKIP	Duncan Smithson	1336	13.12	
Conservative	Ann Friedlos	1321	12.98	
Conservative	Marc Lee Rattigan	1261	12.39	
Labour	Meg Harvey	614	6.03	
Labour	Tom Fell	611	6.00	
Labour	Colin James Harvey	603	5.92	
Independent	Tom Fell	201	1.97	
One Love	Rozanne Duncan	2	0.05	
Majority		13	0.13	
Turnout		10181	78.92	
UKIP gain from Conservative		Swing		
UKIP gain from Conservative		Swing		
Conservative hold		Swing		

=== Cliftonville West ===
Cliftonville West (3 seats)
Party	Candidate	Votes	%	±%
UKIP	Julie Dellar	1116	14.64	
UKIP	Emma Hillman	981	12.87	
UKIP	Linda Potts	932	12.22	
Labour	Alan Robert Currie	886	11.62	
Labour	Terry Askew	800	10.49	
Labour	Aram Ahmed Rawf	722	9.47	
Conservative	Wendy Chaplin	626	8.21	
Conservative	Cedric Leslie Towning	512	6.72	
Conservative	David Macdonald Lawson	498	6.53	
Green	Andrew Philip Jefferson	383	5.02	
	Peter Graham Cook	168	2.21	
Majority		46	0.60	
Turnout		7624	64.66	
UKIP gain from Labour		Swing		
UKIP gain from Labour		Swing		
UKIP gain from Labour		Swing		

=== Dane Valley ===
Dane Valley (3 seats)
Party	Candidate	Votes	%	±%
UKIP	Gary James Taylor	1280	18.57	
UKIP	Rosamund Dixon	1091	15.83	
UKIP	Gary William Hillman	1051	15.25	
Conservative	Paul Mills	925	13.42	
Labour	John Martin Edwards	809	11.74	
Labour	Louise Mary Frances Drelaud	739	10.92	
Labour	Sheila Mandy Stone	684	9.92	
Liberal Democrats	Matt Brown	313	4.55	
Majority		126	1.83	
Turnout		6892	59.95	
UKIP gain from Labour		Swing		
UKIP gain from Labour		Swing		
UKIP gain from Labour		Swing		

=== Eastcliffe ===
Eastcliffe (3 seats)
Party	Candidate	Votes	%	±%
UKIP	Janet Falcon	1105	13.27	
UKIP	Sarah Larkins	1051	12.63	
UKIP	Hunter Stummer-Schmertzing	934	11.22	
Labour	Mary Dwyer-King	917	11.02	
Labour	Rick Everitt	874	10.50	
Labour	John Worrow	760	9.13	
Conservative	David Stephen Kingham	636	7.64	
Conservative	Janet Ann Kingham	573	6.88	
Conservative	Pauline Turner	589	5.87	
Green	Ian Driver	435	5.23	
Green	Aaron Oldale	352	4.23	
We Are The Reality Party	Ian Driver	198	2.38	
Majority		17	0.20	
Turnout		8324	65.12	
UKIP gain from Labour		Swing		
UKIP gain from Labour		Swing		
UKIP gain from Labour		Swing		

=== Garlinge ===
Garlinge (2 seats)
Party	Candidate	Votes	%	±%
Conservative	Jonathan Hugh Curran	878	21.15	
UKIP	John Dennis	789	19.00	
UKIP	Stewart George Evans	773	18.62	
Conservative	Shirley Ann Tomlinson	693	16.69	
Labour	Kay Ann Dark	429	10.33	
Labour	Ela Lodge-Pritchard	390	9.39	
Independent	Clive Edwin Morris	200	4.82	
Majority		16	0.39	
Turnout		4152	69.91	
UKIP gain from Conservative		Swing		
Conservative hold		Swing		

=== Kingsgate ===
Kingsgate (1 seat)
Party	Candidate	Votes	%	±%
Conservative	Bob Bayford	675	53.07	
UKIP	Bowen Fuller	370	29.09	
Labour	Richard Leonard Symonds	227	17.84	
Majority		305	23.98	
Turnout		1272	73.05	
Conservative hold		Swing		

=== Margate Central ===
Margate Central (2 seats)
Party	Candidate	Votes	%	±%
Labour	Iris Johnston	680	18.39	
UKIP	Jeffrey Elenor	639	17.28	
UKIP	Mo Elenor	590	15.96	
Labour	John Watkins	497	13.44	
Conservative	Paul Messenger	441	11.93	
Conservative	Simon John Smith	348	9.41	
Green	Louise Elizabeth Oldfield	232	6.28	
Green	Edward John Targett	159	4.30	
We Are The Reality Party	Roxy Tesla	64	1.73	
	Mandy Kiddell	47	1.28	
Majority		49	1.33	
Turnout		3697	65.43	
UKIP gain from Labour		Swing		
Labour hold		Swing		

=== Nethercourt ===
Nethercourt (2 seats)
Party	Candidate	Votes	%	±%
UKIP	Jeremy Fairbrass	928	20.55	
UKIP	Lin Fairbrass	845	18.72	
Labour	Steve Alexandrou	747	16.54	
Conservative	Sandy Spicer	722	15.99	
Conservative	Mike Taylor	642	14.22	
Labour	Patricia Moore	631	13.98	
Majority		98	2.17	
Turnout		4515	73.30	
UKIP gain from Labour		Swing		
UKIP gain from Labour		Swing		

=== Newington ===
Newington (2 seats)
Party	Candidate	Votes	%	±%
UKIP	Mo Leys	884	18.56	
UKIP	Vince Munday	845	21.54	
Labour	Karen Mary Constantine	728	18.56	
Labour	David Green	713	18.17	
Conservative	Daphne Evelyn Sharp	390	9.94	
Conservative	Jill Louise Bayford	363	9.25	
Majority		117	2.98	
Turnout		3923	67.70	
UKIP gain from Labour		Swing		
UKIP gain from Labour		Swing		

=== Northwood ===
Northwood (3 seats)
Party	Candidate	Votes	%	±%
UKIP	Stuart Piper	1351	16.25	
UKIP	Konnor Collins	1344	16.16	
UKIP	Helen Smith	1214	14.60	
Labour	Elizabeth Green	830	9.98	
Labour	David Cooper	800	9.62	
Labour	Susan Kennedy	784	9.43	
Conservative	Ben Thomas Harris	726	8.73	
Conservative	Neville Symes Petts	645	7.75	
Conservative	James Terrence Rattigan	622	7.48	
Majority		384	4.62	
Turnout		8316	64.46	
UKIP gain from Labour		Swing		
UKIP gain from Labour		Swing		
UKIP gain from Labour		Swing		

=== Salmestone ===
Salmestone (2 seats)
Party	Candidate	Votes	%	±%
UKIP	Peter Kenneth Evans	878	20.08	
UKIP	Robin Edwards	794	18.16	
Conservative	Nikki Curran	723	16.54	
Labour	Harry William Scobie	612	14.00	
Labour	Ann Curtis	542	12.40	
Conservative	Pauline Marie Hayfield	524	11.99	
Green	Robin Peter Vaughan-Lyons	176	4.03	
Liberal Democrats	John Finnegan	123	2.80	
Majority		71	1.62	
Turnout		4372	66.27	
UKIP gain from Labour		Swing		
UKIP gain from Labour		Swing		

=== Sir Moses Montefiore ===
Sir Moses Montefiore (2 seats)
Party	Candidate	Votes	%	±%
UKIP	Terry Connor	853	19.13	
Labour	Michelle Fenner	787	17.65	
Labour	Alan Poole	749	16.80	
UKIP	Trevor Cooper	747	16.75	
Conservative	John Holmes	534	11.98	
Conservative	Paul Anthony Dunk	528	11.84	
Green	Tricia Hartley	152	3.41	
Green	Tony Uden	109	2.44	
Majority		38	0.85	
Turnout		4459	72.18	
UKIP gain from Labour		Swing		
Labour hold		Swing		

=== St Peters ===
St Peters (3 seats)
Party	Candidate	Votes	%	±%
Conservative	Roy Dexter	1449	13.90	
Conservative	Ian Gregory	1416	13.58	
Conservative	Jason Savage	1407	13.50	
UKIP	Malcolm Gosman	1232	11.82	
UKIP	Zita Wiltshire	1066	10.22	
UKIP	Charlie Leys	1048	10.35	
Labour	Margaret Elizabeth Symonds	934	8.96	
Labour	Barnabas Sadler	920	8.82	
Labour	Keith Robert Veness	840	8.06	
We Are The Reality Party	Tess King	114	1.09	
Majority		75	1.68	
Turnout		10426	70.83	
Conservative hold		Swing		
Conservative hold		Swing		
Conservative hold		Swing		

=== Thanet Villages ===
Thanet Villages (3 seats)
Party	Candidate	Votes	%	±%
Independent	Bob Grove	1326	16.02	
Conservative	Ken Gregory	1273	15.38	
UKIP	Derek Morris Crow-Brown	1197	14.46	
Conservative	Linda Ann Wright	1083	13.08	
UKIP	Angela Margaret Curtis	1033	12.48	
UKIP	Trevor Michael Chapman	916	11.06	
Green	Natasha Anne Ransom	601	7.26	
Labour	Seamus Yener	515	6.22	
	Sonya Elizabeth Smyth	335	4.04	
Majority		114	1.38	
Turnout		8279	78.65	
UKIP gain from Conservative		Swing		
Independent hold		Swing		
Conservative hold		Swing		

=== Viking ===
Viking (3 seats)
Party	Candidate	Votes	%	±%
Conservative	David William Harry Saunders	1781	16.18	
Conservative	Mave Saunders	1662	15.10	
Conservative	Rosanna Theresa Daphne Taylor-Smith	1450	13.17	
UKIP	Mike Pearce	1114	10.12	
UKIP	Zara Osmond	1030	9.36	
Labour	Thomas Oswald MacDonald	1018	9.25	
Labour	Kate Louise Hamlyn	990	9.00	
UKIP	Mark Stubbings	883	8.02	
Labour	Khoshnaf Mohammed Ali Mohammed Al-Kaid	848	7.70	
	Ruth Angela Bailey	230	2.10	
Majority		336	3.05	
Turnout		11006	77.62	
Conservative hold		Swing		
Conservative hold		Swing		
Conservative hold		Swing		

=== Westbrook ===
Westbrook (2 seats)
Party	Candidate	Votes	%	±%
Conservative	Mick Tomlinson	838	20.71	
UKIP	Ash Ashbee	781	19.3	
Conservative	Marcus Kenny	742	18.33	
UKIP	Geoffrey Dixon	647	15.99	
Labour	Christopher Anthony Rose	451	11.14	
Labour	Anthony John Ovenden	428	10.58	
	Richard David Charlton	160	3.95	
Majority		39	0.96	
Turnout		4047	71.07	
UKIP gain from Conservative		Swing		
Conservative hold		Swing		

=== Westgate-on-Sea ===
Westgate-on-Sea (3 seats)
Party	Candidate	Votes	%	±%
Conservative	Samantha Bambridge	1210	13.12	
UKIP	Bertie James Braidwood	1057	11.46	
Conservative	Carol Partington	956	10.37	
Independent	Thomas George King	838	9.09	
Conservative	Reece Glenn Patrick Pugh	831	9.01	
UKIP	Angela Valerie Brown	829	8.99	
UKIP	Carol Ann Chapman	807	8.75	
Labour	Lynda Diane Robinson	581	6.30	
Labour	Victoria Childs	554	6.01	
Labour	Jim Driver	469	5.09	
	Dave Morrish	376	4.08	
Liberal Democrats	James P Calcutt	294	3.18	
Liberal Democrats	Cheri Pennington	224	2.42	
Liberal Democrats	Martyn Pennington	197	2.13	
Majority		118	1.28	
Turnout		9223	71.49	
UKIP gain from Independent		Swing		
Conservative hold		Swing		
Conservative hold		Swing		

== Post-election changes ==
Newington by-election: 21 January 2016
Party	Candidate	Votes	%	±%
Labour	Karen Constantine	288	37.7	+1.3
UKIP	Duncan Smithson	229	30.0	−14.2
Conservative	Adam Dark	156	20.4	+0.9
Independent	Alan Hodder	49	6.4	N/A
Green	Ian Driver	20	2.6	N/A
Liberal Democrats	Jordan Williams	12	1.6	N/A
Independent	Grahame Birchall	10	1.3	N/A
Majority		59	7.7	N/A
Turnout		764	39.5	−28.2
Labour gain from UKIP		Swing		
