= Hertford and Stortford =

UK Parliament constituency (since 1983)

Coordinates: 51°49′N 0°01′E

- County constituency for the House of Commons
- Interactive map of boundaries since 2024
- Boundary within the East of England
- County: Hertfordshire
- Electorate: 75,396 (March 2020)
- Major settlements: Hertford, Bishop's Stortford, Ware

Current constituency
- Created: 1983
- Member of Parliament: Josh Dean (Labour)
- Created from: Hertfordshire East and Hertford and Stevenage

Hertford and Stortford is a constituency (Note: A county constituency (for the purposes of election expenses and type of returning officer)) represented in the House of Commons of the UK Parliament by Josh Dean of the Labour Party since 2024. (Note: As with all constituencies, the constituency elects one Member of Parliament (MP) by the first past the post system of election at least every five years.)

== Constituency profile ==
The constituency is semi-rural and includes picturesque villages and farmland. The rivers Rib, Beane, Mimram, and Lea all meet in the county town of Hertford (2011 population 25,000), a Green Belt encircles the town and separates it from Ware (18,000) in the western part of the constituency. Farms continue between Ware and the market town of Bishop's Stortford (40,000), in the northeast corner of the seat.

Hertford and Stortford constituency is generally regarded as an affluent seat, and includes a significant proportion of professional and managerial workers. Central London is within commuting distance by train of all the towns in the constituency. The pharmaceutical industry is a major employer in the seat and surrounding areas: both Ware and Harlow are the sites of GlaxoSmithKline facilities (while Gilston hosted Merck & Co. between 1982 and 2006). Since the early 1990s, Stansted, just beyond the eastern perimeter of the constituency, has also been responsible for bringing jobs and an improved train service to it.

Many commuters live in Bishop's Stortford, which has rail links to London's Liverpool Street station and is also close to Stansted Airport. Since the 1980s, the population of Thorley—now a southern suburb of Stortford—has become increasingly composed of owner-occupied houses in dormitory estates.

The seat was previously held by the Conservative Party with comfortable majorities from its creation in 1983 until the 2024 general election, when the Labour Party won it on a very large swing of 20.4%.

== Boundaries and boundary changes ==
=== Historic ===
==== 1983–1997 ====
The District of East Hertfordshire wards of Bishop's Stortford Central, Bishop's Stortford Chantry, Bishop's Stortford Parsonage, Bishop's Stortford Thorley, Braughing, Buntingford, Hertford Bengeo, Hertford Castle, Hertford Kingsmead, Hertford Sele, Hunsdon, Little Hadham, Much Hadham, Sawbridgeworth, Standon St Mary, Stapleford, Tewin, Thundridge, Ware Christchurch, Ware Priory, Ware St Mary's, and Ware Trinity.

The new constituency established in 1983 combined Hertford and Ware, from the abolished constituency of Hertford and Stevenage, with Bishop's Stortford, Sawbridgeworth and rural areas to the west, from the abolished constituency of East Hertfordshire.

==== 1997–2010 ====
The District of East Hertfordshire wards of Bishop's Stortford Central, Bishop's Stortford Chantry, Bishop's Stortford Parsonage, Bishop's Stortford Thorley, Great Amwell, Hertford Bengeo, Hertford Castle, Hertford Kingsmead, Hertford Sele, Hunsdon, Little Amwell, Much Hadham, Sawbridgeworth, Stanstead, Ware Christchurch, Ware Priory, Ware St Mary's, and Ware Trinity.

The villages of Stanstead Abbotts and Great Amwell transferred from Broxbourne. Northern, rural areas transferred to the new constituency of North East Hertfordshire.

==== 2010–2024 ====
Map of boundaries 2010–2024

The District of East Hertfordshire wards of Bishop's Stortford All Saints, Bishop's Stortford Central, Bishop's Stortford Meads, Bishop's Stortford Silverleys, Bishop's Stortford South, Great Amwell, Hertford Bengeo, Hertford Castle, Hertford Heath, Hertford Kingsmead, Hertford Sele, Hunsdon, Much Hadham, Sawbridgeworth, Stanstead Abbots, Ware Chadwell, Ware Christchurch, Ware St Mary's, and Ware Trinity.

Marginal changes due to revision of local authority wards.

=== Current ===
Following the 2023 review of Westminster constituencies, which came into effect for the 2024 general election, the constituency was reduced in size in order to bring it within the electoral quota by transferring the three small wards of Great Amwell, Hertford Heath and Stanstead Abbots (as they existed on 1 December 2020) back to Broxbourne.

Following a local government boundary review which came into effect in May 2023, the constituency now comprises the following from the 2024 general election:

- The District of East Hertfordshire wards of: Bishop's Stortford All Saints, Bishop's Stortford Central, Bishop's Stortford North, Bishop's Stortford Parsonage, Bishop's Stortford South, Bishop's Stortford Thorley Manor, Hertford Bengeo, Hertford Castle, Hertford Kingsmead, Hertford Sele, Hunsdon, Much Hadham, Sawbridgeworth, Ware Priory, Ware Rural (parish of Wareside), Ware St Mary's, and Ware Trinity.

== Members of Parliament ==
Hertfordshire East and Hertford and Stevenage prior to 1983

Election	Member	Party
1983	Bowen Wells	Conservative
2001	Mark Prisk	Conservative
2019	Julie Marson	Conservative
2024	Josh Dean	Labour

== Elections ==
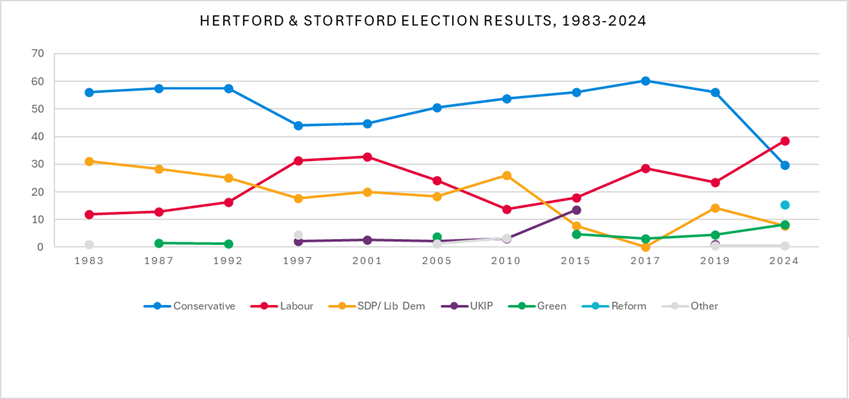
Hertford & Stortford election results 1983–2024

=== Elections in the 2020s ===
General election 2024: Hertford and Stortford
Party	Candidate	Votes	%	±%
Labour	Josh Dean	20,808	38.5	+14.8
Conservative	Julie Marson	16,060	29.7	−26.0
Reform	John Burmicz	8,325	15.4	N/A
Green	Nick Cox	4,373	8.1	+3.5
Liberal Democrats	Helen Campbell	4,167	7.7	−6.5
ADF	Jane Fowler	139	0.3	N/A
Heritage	Barry Hensall	137	0.3	N/A
Majority		4,748	8.8	N/A
Turnout		54,009	68.0	−5.8
Registered electors		78,915		
Labour gain from Conservative		Swing	+20.4	

=== Elections in the 2010s ===
2019 notional result
Party	Vote	%
Conservative	30,979	55.7
Labour	13,173	23.7
Liberal Democrats	7,907	14.2
Green	2,587	4.6
UKIP	681	1.2
Others	308	0.6
Turnout	55,635	73.8
Electorate	75,396	

General election 2019: Hertford and Stortford
Party	Candidate	Votes	%	±%
Conservative	Julie Marson	33,712	56.1	−4.2
Labour	Chris Vince	14,092	23.4	−5.2
Liberal Democrats	Chris Lucas	8,596	14.3	+6.2
Green	Lucy Downes	2,705	4.5	+1.5
UKIP	Alistair Lindsay	681	1.1	N/A
Independent	Brian Percival	308	0.5	N/A
Majority		19,620	32.7	+1.0
Turnout		60,094	72.9	+0.1
Registered electors		81,765		
Conservative hold		Swing	+0.5	

General election 2017: Hertford and Stortford
Party	Candidate	Votes	%	±%
Conservative	Mark Prisk	36,184	60.3	+4.2
Labour	Katherine Chibah	17,149	28.6	+10.7
Liberal Democrats	Mark Argent	4,845	8.1	+0.3
Green	David Woollcombe	1,814	3.0	−1.8
Majority		19,035	31.7	−6.5
Turnout		59,992	72.8	+1.5
Registered electors		82,429		
Conservative hold		Swing	−3.25	

General election 2015: Hertford and Stortford
Party	Candidate	Votes	%	±%
Conservative	Mark Prisk	31,593	56.1	+2.3
Labour	Katherine Chibah	10,084	17.9	+4.1
UKIP	Adrian Baker	7,534	13.4	+10.3
Liberal Democrats	Michael Green	4,385	7.8	−18.2
Green	Sophie Christophy	2,681	4.8	N/A
Majority		21,509	38.2	+10.4
Turnout		56,277	71.3	+0.7
Registered electors		78,906		
Conservative hold		Swing	−1.0	

General election 2010: Hertford and Stortford
Party	Candidate	Votes	%	±%
Conservative	Mark Prisk	29,810	53.8	+3.6
Liberal Democrats	Andrew Lewin	14,373	26.0	+7.5
Labour	Stephen Terry	7,620	13.8	−10.5
UKIP	David Sodey	1,716	3.1	+1.0
BNP	Roy Harris	1,297	2.3	N/A
Independent	Loucas Xenophontos	325	0.6	N/A
Independent	Martin Adams	236	0.4	N/A
Majority		15,437	27.8	+1.4
Turnout		55,377	70.6	+4.1
Registered electors		78,459		+5.8
Conservative hold		Swing	−1.9	

2005 notional result
Party	Vote	%
Conservative	24,673	50.2
Labour	11,917	24.2
Liberal Democrats	9,056	18.4
Green	1,914	3.9
UKIP	1,017	2.1
Others	572	1.2
Turnout	49,149	66.5
Electorate	73,877	

=== Elections in the 2000s ===
General election 2005: Hertford and Stortford
Party	Candidate	Votes	%	±%
Conservative	Mark Prisk	25,074	50.5	+5.8
Labour	Richard Henry	11,977	24.1	−8.7
Liberal Democrats	James Lucas	9,129	18.4	−1.5
Green	Peter Hart	1,914	3.9	N/A
UKIP	David Sodey	1,026	2.1	−0.5
Veritas	Debbie Le May	572	1.2	N/A
Majority		13,097	26.4	+14.5
Turnout		49,692	67.7	+5.5
Registered electors		73,394		–2.4
Conservative hold		Swing	+7.2	

General election 2001: Hertford and Stortford
Party	Candidate	Votes	%	±%
Conservative	Mark Prisk	21,074	44.7	+0.5
Labour	Simon Spellar	15,471	32.8	+1.3
Liberal Democrats	Mione Goldspink	9,388	19.9	+2.2
UKIP	Stuart Rising	1,243	2.6	+0.4
Majority		5,603	11.9	−0.8
Turnout		47,176	62.8	−13.3
Registered electors		75,141		+4.5
Conservative hold		Swing	–0.4	

=== Elections in the 1990s ===
General election 1997: Hertford and Stortford
Party	Candidate	Votes	%	±%
Conservative	Bowen Wells	24,027	44.1	–12.4
Labour	Simon Spellar	17,142	31.4	+14.6
Liberal Democrats	Michael Wood	9,679	17.7	–7.7
Referendum	Hugo Page Croft	2,105	3.9	N/A
UKIP	B G Smalley	1,233	2.2	N/A
ProLife Alliance	Michael Franey	259	0.5	N/A
Majority		6,885	12.6	–18.4
Turnout		54,445	75.9	–4.2
Registered electors		71,759		+1.6
Conservative hold		Swing	–13.5	

1992 notional result
Party	Vote	%
Conservative	31,942	56.5
Liberal Democrats	14,408	25.5
Labour	9,529	16.9
Others	660	1.2
Turnout	56,539	80.1
Electorate	70,578	

General election 1992: Hertford and Stortford
Party	Candidate	Votes	%	±%
Conservative	Bowen Wells	35,716	57.5	–0.0
Liberal Democrats	Christopher White	15,506	25.0	−3.4
Labour	AJ Bovaird	10,125	16.3	+3.5
Green	JA Goth	780	1.3	−0.1
Majority		20,210	32.5	+3.3
Turnout		62,127	81.0	+3.3
Registered electors		76,654		+1.5
Conservative hold		Swing	+1.7	

=== Elections in the 1980s ===
General election 1987: Hertford and Stortford
Party	Candidate	Votes	%	±%
Conservative	Bowen Wells	33,763	57.5	+1.5
SDP	Ronald Wotherspoon	16,623	28.3	−2.7
Labour Co-op	Patricia Sumner	7,494	12.8	+0.8
Green	Graham Cole	814	1.4	N/A
Majority		17,140	29.2	+4.3
Turnout		58,694	77.7	+2.1
Registered electors		75,508		+9.1
Conservative hold		Swing	+2.2	

General election 1983: Hertford and Stortford
Party	Candidate	Votes	%	±%
Conservative	Bowen Wells	29,039	56.0	+1.1
SDP	Ronald Wotherspoon	16,110	31.1	+18.8
Labour	John Carr	6,203	12.0	–19.2
BNP	G Wiles	304	0.6	N/A
Prosperity For All	P Cullen	221	0.4	N/A
Majority		12,929	24.9	+1.2
Turnout		51,877	75.6	
Registered electors		68,615		
Conservative hold		Swing	–8.9	

1979 notional result
Party	Vote	%
Conservative	27,883	54.9
Labour	15,820	31.1
Liberal	6,234	12.3
Others	854	1.7
Turnout	50,791	
Electorate		

== See also ==
- List of parliamentary constituencies in Hertfordshire
- List of parliamentary constituencies in the East of England (region)
