= East Hertfordshire District Council elections =

Local government elections in Hertfordshire, England

East Hertfordshire District Council is elected every four years.

== Elections Summary and Political control ==
Composition of the council
Year	Conservative	Labour	Liberal Democrats (Note: Includes totals for the predecessors of the Liberal Democrats, the Liberal Party and SDP (both of which participated in the Alliance).)	Green (Note: Includes totals for the predecessors of the Green Party of England and Wales, the Ecology Party and Green Party UK.)	Independents & Others	Council control after election
Local government reorganisation; council established (48 seats)
1973	16	10	0	–	22	No overall control
1976	28	1	0	0	19	Conservative
New ward boundaries (50 seats)
1979	30	3	0	0	17	Conservative
1983	32	2	2	0	14	Conservative
1987	32	1	5	0	12	Conservative
1991	32	2	12	0	4	Conservative
1995	23	8	16	0	3	No overall control
New ward boundaries (50 seats)
1999	31	8	9	0	2	Conservative
2003	41	0	7	0	2	Conservative
2007	42	0	4	0	4	Conservative
2011	46	0	2	0	2	Conservative
2015	50	0	0	0	0	Conservative
2019	40	2	6	2	0	Conservative
New ward boundaries (50 seats)
2023	16	5	10	19	0	No overall control

== Council elections ==
- 1973 East Hertfordshire District Council election
- 1976 East Hertfordshire District Council election
- 1979 East Hertfordshire District Council election (New ward boundaries)
- 1983 East Hertfordshire District Council election
- 1987 East Hertfordshire District Council election (District boundary changes took place but the number of seats remained the same)
- 1991 East Hertfordshire District Council election
- 1995 East Hertfordshire District Council election (District boundary changes took place but the number of seats remained the same)
- 1999 East Hertfordshire District Council election (New ward boundaries)
- 2003 East Hertfordshire District Council election
- 2007 East Hertfordshire District Council election
- 2011 East Hertfordshire District Council election
- 2015 East Hertfordshire District Council election
- 2019 East Hertfordshire District Council election
- 2023 East Hertfordshire District Council election (New ward boundaries)

== Results maps ==
2003 results map

2007 results map

2011 results map

2015 results map

2019 results map

2023 results map

== By-election results ==
=== 1999-2003 ===
Braughing By-Election 29 February 2000
Party	Candidate	Votes	%	±%
Conservative		324	49.7	−17.0
Liberal Democrats		247	37.9	+26.5
Labour		80	12.3	−9.6
Majority		77	11.8	
Turnout		651	33.0	
Conservative hold		Swing		

Bishop's Stortford Central By-Election 27 July 2000
Party	Candidate	Votes	%	±%
Conservative		325	30.0	+10.9
Labour		295	27.2	+4.5
Liberal Democrats		230	21.2	+3.0
Independent		172	15.9	−12.0
Green		63	5.8	−6.1
Majority		30	2.8	
Turnout		1,085	16.5	
Conservative gain from Labour		Swing		

=== 2003-2007 ===
Little Hadham By-Election 18 December 2003
Party	Candidate	Votes	%	±%
Conservative		307	58.9	−6.1
Liberal Democrats		194	37.2	+2.2
Labour		20	3.8	+3.8
Majority		113	21.7	
Turnout		521	30.5	
Conservative hold		Swing		

Walkern By-Election 28 July 2005
Party	Candidate	Votes	%	±%
Conservative	Giles Scrivener	308	64.0	−2.5
Labour	Maureen Marr	89	18.5	−15.0
Liberal Democrats	Anthony Gubb	65	13.5	+13.5
Green	Lydia Somerville	20	4.1	+4.1
Majority		219	45.5	
Turnout		482	24.5	
Conservative hold		Swing		

Hertford Rural South By-Election 14 October 2005
Party	Candidate	Votes	%	±%
Conservative	Linda Haysey	317	74.2	
Liberal Democrats	Catherine Edwards	85	19.9	
Labour	Pamela Nicholas	25	5.9	
Majority		232	54.3	
Turnout		427	23.1	
Conservative hold		Swing		

Great Anwell By-Election 22 June 2006
Party	Candidate	Votes	%	±%
Conservative	Janet Mayes	314	78.3	
Labour	Richard Cooke	36	9.0	
Green	Glen Baker	26	6.5	
Liberal Democrats	David Davies	25	6.2	
Majority		278	69.3	
Turnout		401		
Conservative hold		Swing		

=== 2007-2011 ===
Ware Christchurch By-Election 4 June 2009
Party	Candidate	Votes	%	±%
Liberal Democrats	Victoria Shaw	674	46.8	+27.7
Conservative	George Powell	663	46.0	+7.2
Labour	Linda Harvey	104	7.2	−2.8
Majority		11	0.8	
Turnout		1,441		
Liberal Democrats gain from Conservative		Swing		

Hunsdon By-Election 11 November 2010
Party	Candidate	Votes	%	±%
Independent	Michael Newman	339	58.9	+58.9
Conservative	Geoffrey Williamson	206	35.8	+2.3
Labour	Linda Harvey	31	5.4	+5.4
Majority		133	23.1	
Turnout		576		
Independent hold		Swing		

Sawbridgeworth By-Election 23 December 2010
Party	Candidate	Votes	%	±%
Independent	Eric Buckmaster	441	45.1	+45.1
Conservative	William Mortimer	343	35.1	−7.4
Labour	Peter Mitchell	99	10.1	+10.1
Liberal Democrats	Peter Mitchell	95	9.7	−11.7
Majority		98	10.0	
Turnout		978		
Independent hold		Swing		

=== 2011-2015 ===
Bishop's Stortford Meads By-Election 2 May 2013
Party	Candidate	Votes	%	±%
Conservative	Keith Warnell	713	49.9	+0.8
Liberal Democrats	Mione Goldspink	452	31.7	+5.5
Labour	Val Cooke	263	18.4	−6.3
Majority		261	18.3	
Turnout		1,428		
Conservative hold		Swing		

Buntingford By-Election 2 May 2013
Party	Candidate	Votes	%	±%
Conservative	Jeff Jones	626	49.6	+4.1
Independent	Debbie Lemay	404	32.0	+3.0
Labour	Anthony Martin	233	18.4	−7.1
Majority		222	17.6	
Turnout		1,263		
Conservative hold		Swing		

Hertford Castle By-Election 2 May 2013
Party	Candidate	Votes	%	±%
Independent	Jim Thornton	961	55.5	+28.3
Conservative	Barbara Martin	769	44.5	+1.0
Majority		192	11.0	
Turnout		1,730		
Independent gain from Conservative		Swing		

Watton-at-Stone By-Election 2 May 2013
Party	Candidate	Votes	%	±%
Conservative	Rik Sharma	755	90.2	+4.8
Labour	Steve Buckingham	82	9.8	−4.8
Majority		673	80.4	
Turnout		837		
Conservative hold		Swing		

Bishop's Stortford Central By-Election 22 May 2014
Party	Candidate	Votes	%	±%
Conservative	George Cutting	779	31.1	−0.4
UKIP	Deborah Rennie	734	29.3	+29.3
Labour	Natalie Russell	509	20.3	+4.1
Liberal Democrats	Madeline Goldspink	483	19.3	−5.0
Majority		45	1.8	
Turnout		2,505		
Conservative hold		Swing		

=== 2015-2019 ===
Hertford Heath By-Election 17 December 2015
Party	Candidate	Votes	%	±%
Independent	Charlotte Snowdon	269	52.0	+6.7
Liberal Democrats	Rob Lambie	101	19.5	+19.5
UKIP	Sheila Pettman	70	13.5	−1.8
Labour	Graham Nickson	56	10.8	−1.7
Green	Hilary Cullen	21	4.1	−1.7
Majority		168	32.5	
Turnout		517		
Conservative hold		Swing		

Charlotte Snowdon appeared on the ballot as an independent due to nomination issues. As she joined the Conservative grouping upon her election, this by-election is listed as a Conservative hold.

Puckeridge By-Election 15 September 2016
Party	Candidate	Votes	%	±%
Conservative	Peter Boylan	179	42.9	−24.6
UKIP	Geoffrey Miles	79	18.9	+18.9
Liberal Democrats	Sara Mihajlovic	75	18.0	+18.0
Labour	David Bell	46	11.0	−8.9
Green	Tabitha Evans	38	9.1	−3.5
Majority		100	24.0	
Turnout		417		
Conservative hold		Swing		

Hertford Castle By-Election 9 March 2017
Party	Candidate	Votes	%	±%
Conservative	Linda Radford	593	49.0	+8.2
Labour	Veronica Fraser	207	17.1	−2.9
Liberal Democrats	Freya Waterhouse	188	15.5	+15.5
Green	Tony Tarrega	157	13.0	−4.6
UKIP	Mike Shaw	65	5.4	+5.4
Majority		386	31.9	
Turnout		1,210		
Conservative hold		Swing		

Datchworth and Aston By-Election 4 May 2017
Party	Candidate	Votes	%	±%
Conservative	Tony Stowe	668	77.2	+4.2
Liberal Democrats	Victoria Jordan	197	22.8	+22.8
Majority		471	54.4	
Turnout		865		
Conservative hold		Swing		

Watton-at-Stone By-Election 23 August 2018
Party	Candidate	Votes	%	±%
Liberal Democrats	Sophie Bell	531	67.0	+67.0
Conservative	Andrew Huggins	238	30.1	−36.3
Labour	Veronica Fraser	23	2.9	−8.3
Majority		293	36.9	
Turnout		794		
Liberal Democrats gain from Conservative		Swing		

=== 2019-2023 ===
Bishop's Stortford All Saints By-Election 6 May 2021
Party	Candidate	Votes	%	±%
Liberal Democrats	Richard Townsend	1,194	49.6	+3.3
Conservative	Shane Manning	821	34.1	+1.6
Labour	Thomas Diamond	392	16.3	+3.8
Majority		373	15.5	
Turnout		2,407	40.8	
Liberal Democrats hold		Swing		

=== 2023-2027 ===
Braughing and Standon By-Election 1 May 2025
Party	Candidate	Votes	%	±%
Reform	Terry Smith	541	34.6	
Conservative	Jane Dodson	484	31.0	
Green	James Taylor-Moran	307	19.6	
Labour	Jo Linney	134	8.6	
Liberal Democrats	Freddie Jewitt	97	6.2	
Majority		57	3.6	
Turnout		1,563		
Reform gain from Conservative		Swing		

Little Hadham and The Pelhams By-Election 7 May 2026
Party	Candidate	Votes	%	±%
Conservative	Jeff Jones	469	36.5	
Reform	Fraser Jones	359	28.0	
Green	Rob Dawson	172	13.4	
Labour	Pauline Kellett	157	12.2	
Liberal Democrats	Karl Harrington	127	9.9	
Majority		110	8.6	
Turnout		1,284		
Conservative hold		Swing		

Hertford Kingsmead By-Election 22 October 2026
Party	Candidate	Votes	%	±%
Conservative	Rosemary Bolton	575	35.3	
Green	Drew Waller-Downes	529	32.4	
Reform	Christopher Bush	253	15.5	
Labour	Dawn Newell	164	10.1	
Liberal Democrats	Elif Lewis	110	6.7	
Majority		46	2.8	
Turnout		1,631		
Conservative gain from Green		Swing		

== See also ==
- East Hertfordshire District Council
