= 2019 East Hertfordshire District Council election =

2019 UK local government election

- 2 May 2019

All 50 seats to East Hertfordshire District Council 26 seats needed for a majority
- Turnout: 31.7%

	First party	Second party
Party	Conservative	Liberal Democrats
Last election	50 seats, 58.8%	0 seats, 5.9%
Seats won	40	6
Seat change	▼10	▲6
Popular vote	28,470	11,833
Percentage	45.7%	19.0%
Swing	▼13.1%	▲13.1%
	Third party	Fourth party
Party	Labour	Green
Last election	0 seats, 17.4%	0 seats, 8.7%
Seats won	2	2
Seat change	▲2	▲2
Popular vote	10,743	9,355
Percentage	17.3%	15.0%
Swing	▼0.1%	▲6.3%
- Winner of each seat at the 2019 East Hertfordshire District Council election
Council control before election
Conservative
Council control after election
Conservative

The 2019 East Hertfordshire District Council election took place on 2 May 2019 to elect all members of East Hertfordshire District Council in England. The Conservatives retained control of the council, but lost 10 seats.

== Results summary ==
2019 East Hertfordshire District Council election
Party	Candidates	Seats	Gains	Losses	Net gain/loss	Seats %	Votes %	Votes	+/−
Conservative	50	40	0	10	▼10	80.0	45.9	28,670	–12.9
Liberal Democrats	26	6	6	0	▲6	12.0	18.9	11,833	+13.0
Labour	38	2	2	0	▲2	4.0	17.2	10,743	–0.2
Green	27	2	2	0	▲2	4.0	15.0	9,375	+6.3
Independent	3	0	0	0	Steady	0.0	1.9	1,207	+0.1
UKIP	3	0	0	0	Steady	0.0	1.0	646	–6.4

== Ward results ==
=== Bishop's Stortford All Saints ===
Bishop's Stortford All Saints (3 seats)
Party	Candidate	Votes	%	±%
Liberal Democrats	Chris Wilson	1,042	49.5	
Liberal Democrats	Terence Beckett	995	47.2	
Liberal Democrats	Louie Corpe	979	46.5	
Conservative	Colin Woodward	732	34.7	
Conservative	Patricia Moore	635	30.1	
Conservative	Shane Manning	602	28.6	
Labour	Margaret Barker	281	13.3	
Labour	Eamonn Abbott	255	12.1	
UKIP	Alistair Lindsay	195	9.3	
Registered electors		5,847		
Rejected ballots		14	0.7	
Turnout		2121	36.28	
Liberal Democrats gain from Conservative		Swing		
Liberal Democrats gain from Conservative		Swing		
Liberal Democrats gain from Conservative		Swing		

=== Bishop's Stortford Central ===
Bishop's Stortford Central (3 seats)
Party	Candidate	Votes	%	±%
Conservative	Holly Drake	856	41.3	
Conservative	Norma Symonds	683	32.9	
Conservative	George Cutting	678	32.7	
Liberal Democrats	Robert Taylor	579	27.9	
Labour	Thomas Diamond	553	26.7	
Labour	David Jacobs	540	26.0	
Labour	Sotirios Adamopoulos	538	26.0	
Green	Elizabeth Downes	471	22.7	
Green	Lucy Downes	434	20.9	
UKIP	Peter Day	284	13.7	
Registered electors		7,135		
Rejected ballots		24	1.1	
Turnout		2097	29.39	
Conservative hold		Swing		
Conservative hold		Swing		
Conservative hold		Swing		

=== Bishop's Stortford Meads ===
Bishop's Stortford Meads (2 seats)
Party	Candidate	Votes	%	±%
Liberal Democrats	Mione Goldspink	656	43.0	
Conservative	David Snowdon	537	35.2	
Labour	Jill Sortwell	432	28.3	
Conservative	Keith Warnell	417	27.3	
Labour	Elif Toker-Turnalar	412	27.0	
UKIP	Stewart Trench	167	11.0	
Registered electors		4,502		
Rejected ballots		14	0.9	
Turnout		1539	34.18	
Liberal Democrats gain from Conservative		Swing		
Conservative hold		Swing		

=== Bishop's Stortford Silverleys ===
Bishop's Stortford Silverleys (2 seats)
Party	Candidate	Votes	%	±%
Conservative	Tim Page	766	55.1	
Conservative	Alastair Ward-Booth	741	53.3	
Liberal Democrats	Miriam Swainston	497	35.8	
Labour	Ian Payton	268	19.3	
Labour	Natalie Russell	229	16.5	
Registered electors		4,249		
Rejected ballots		31	2.2	
Turnout		1420	33.42	
Conservative hold		Swing		
Conservative hold		Swing		

=== Bishop's Stortford South ===
Bishop's Stortford South (3 seats)
Party	Candidate	Votes	%	±%
Conservative	Diane Hollebon	929	45.4	
Conservative	Graham McAndrew	898	43.9	
Conservative	John Wyllie	871	42.6	
Liberal Democrats	Calvin Horner	597	29.2	
Green	Laura King	507	24.8	
Liberal Democrats	Stephen Skinner	505	24.7	
Liberal Democrats	Paul Tenconi	389	19.0	
Labour	Andrew Cowley	387	18.9	
Labour	Shem Jacobs	286	14.0	
Labour	Mohammed Abouharb	280	13.7	
Registered electors		6,784		
Rejected ballots		56	2.7	
Turnout		2103	31.0	
Conservative hold		Swing		
Conservative hold		Swing		
Conservative hold		Swing		

=== Braughing ===
Braughing (1 seat)
Party	Candidate	Votes	%	±%
Conservative	Peter Boylan	450	52.4	−18.3
Liberal Democrats	David Bromage	290	33.8	N/A
Green	Patricia Street	66	7.7	−5.5
Labour	Steven Stone	52	6.1	−10.0
Registered electors		2,149		
Rejected ballots		14	1.6	
Turnout		872	40.58	
Conservative hold		Swing		

=== Buntingford ===
Buntingford (2 seats)
Party	Candidate	Votes	%	±%
Conservative	Jeffrey Jones	872	56.6	
Conservative	Stanley Bull	782	50.7	
Green	David Woollcombe	512	33.2	
Liberal Democrats	Karl Harrington	336	21.8	
Labour	Anthony Martin	282	18.3	
Registered electors		5,439		
Rejected ballots		27	1.7	
Turnout		1568	28.83	
Conservative hold		Swing		
Conservative hold		Swing		

=== Datchworth and Aston ===
Datchworth and Aston (1 seat)
Party	Candidate	Votes	%	±%
Conservative	Anthony Stowe	503	62.7	−10.3
Green	Lydia Helen Somerville	136	17.0	+4.7
Labour	Simon Cockle	84	10.5	−4.2
Liberal Democrats	Freddie Jewitt	79	9.9	N/A
Registered electors		1,920		
Rejected ballots		10	1.2	
Turnout		812	42.29	
Conservative hold		Swing		

=== Great Amwell ===
Great Amwell (1 seat)
Party	Candidate	Votes	%	±%
Conservative	Alexander Curtis	344	67.1	−8.5
Liberal Democrats	Catherine Beaujeux	169	32.9	N/A
Registered electors		2,142		
Rejected ballots		30	5.5	
Turnout		543	25.35	
Conservative hold		Swing		

=== Hertford Bengeo ===
Hertford Bengeo (3 seats)
Party	Candidate	Votes	%	±%
Conservative	Peter Ruffles	1,171	52.8	
Conservative	Sally Newton	908	41.0	
Green	Ben Crystall	744	33.6	
Conservative	Daniel Chichester-Miles	731	33.0	
Green	John Howson	606	27.3	
Labour	Veronica Fraser	503	22.7	
Green	John Warn	445	20.1	
Liberal Democrats	John Wiggett	426	19.2	
Labour	Tracy Turner	374	16.9	
Labour	Alexander Turner	364	16.4	
Registered electors		5,940		
Rejected ballots		43	1.9	
Turnout		2260	38.05	
Conservative hold		Swing		
Conservative hold		Swing		
Green gain from Conservative		Swing		

=== Hertford Castle ===
Hertford Castle (3 seats)
Party	Candidate	Votes	%	±%
Conservative	Janet Goodeve	828	39.8	
Conservative	Robert Deering	811	39.0	
Conservative	Suzanne Rutland-Barsby	811	39.0	
Green	Rachel Carter	671	32.3	
Labour	Stephen Goodair	509	24.5	
Green	Isabelle Robinson	504	24.2	
Green	Benjamin McKeown	496	23.9	
Labour	Maria Heritier-Porter	480	23.1	
Liberal Democrats	Freya Waterhouse	432	20.8	
Labour	Kenneth Warren	398	19.1	
Registered electors		7,068		
Rejected ballots		56	2.6	
Turnout		2135	30.21	
Conservative hold		Swing		
Conservative hold		Swing		
Conservative hold		Swing		

=== Hertford Heath ===
Hertford Heath (1 seat)
Party	Candidate	Votes	%	±%
Conservative	Charlie Rowley	330	45.7	+0.4
Independent	James Thornton	305	42.2	N/A
Labour	David Barnett	87	12.0	−0.5
Registered electors		2,330		
Rejected ballots		8	1.1	
Turnout		730	31.33	
Conservative hold		Swing		

=== Hertford Kingsmead ===
Hertford Kingsmead (2 seats)
Party	Candidate	Votes	%	±%
Conservative	Rosemary Bolton	532	43.3	
Conservative	Marilyn Stevenson	446	36.3	
Green	Steven Watson	347	28.2	
Liberal Democrats	Stuart Hunt	337	27.4	
Labour	Mary Nesbitt-Larking	337	27.4	
Liberal Democrats	Andrew Porrer	313	25.5	
Registered electors		4,314		
Rejected ballots		19	1.5	
Turnout		1248	28.93	
Conservative hold		Swing		
Conservative hold		Swing		

=== Hertford Rural North ===
Hertford Rural North (1 seat)
Party	Candidate	Votes	%	±%
Conservative	Michael McMullen	423	68.4	−9.3
Green	Alexandra Daar	134	21.7	+10.5
Labour	Catherine Henderson	61	9.9	−1.2
Registered electors		1,817		
Rejected ballots		10	1.6	
Turnout		628	34.56	
Conservative hold		Swing		

=== Hertford Rural South ===
Hertford Rural South (1 seat)
Party	Candidate	Votes	%	±%
Conservative	Linda Haysey	436	63.0	+0.4
Green	Claire Goodman	132	19.1	N/A
Liberal Democrats	Catherine Edwards	124	17.9	+9.8
Registered electors		2,047		
Rejected ballots		21	2.9	
Turnout		713	34.83	
Conservative hold		Swing		

=== Hertford Sele ===
Hertford Sele (2 seats)
Party	Candidate	Votes	%	±%
Labour	Mary Brady	497	44.4	
Labour Co-op	Carolyn Redfern	494	44.1	
Green	Anthony Tarrega	385	34.4	
Conservative	Chantal Geall	349	31.2	
Conservative	Christopher White	309	27.6	
Registered electors		4,067		
Rejected ballots		22	1.9	
Turnout		1141	28.06	
Labour gain from Conservative		Swing		
Labour gain from Conservative		Swing		

=== Hunsdon ===
Hunsdon (1 seat)
Party	Candidate	Votes	%	±%
Conservative	Eric Buckmaster	345	53.0	+11.7
Green	Hilary Cullen	306	47.0	N/A
Registered electors		2,545		
Rejected ballots		19	2.8	
Turnout		670	26.33	
Conservative hold		Swing		

=== Little Hadham ===
Little Hadham (1 seat)
Party	Candidate	Votes	%	±%
Conservative	Geoffrey Williamson	420	64.4	−9.2
Green	Louise Lumb	232	35.6	+9.2
Registered electors		1,950		
Rejected ballots		13	2.0	
Turnout		665	34.1	
Conservative hold		Swing		

=== Much Hadham ===
Much Hadham (1 seat)
Party	Candidate	Votes	%	±%
Conservative	Ian Devonshire	Unopposed	N/A	−58.4
Turnout		N/A	N/A	
Conservative hold		Swing		

=== Mundens and Cottered ===
Mundens and Cottered (1 seat)
Party	Candidate	Votes	%	±%
Conservative	Andrew Huggins	459	68.2	−10.4
Green	Madela Baddock	153	22.7	N/A
Labour	David King	61	9.1	−12.3
Registered electors		1,969		
Rejected ballots		21	3.0	
Turnout		694	35.25	
Conservative hold		Swing		

=== Puckeridge ===
Puckeridge (1 seat)
Party	Candidate	Votes	%	±%
Conservative	Antony Hall	297	53.7	−13.7
Green	Tabitha Evans	142	25.7	+13.1
Labour	Janette Cuthbert	113	20.4	+0.6
Registered electors		2,145		
Rejected ballots		21	3.7	
Turnout		574	26.76	
Conservative hold		Swing		

=== Sawbridgeworth ===
Sawbridgeworth (3 seats)
Party	Candidate	Votes	%	±%
Conservative	Ruth Buckmaster	1,116	54.9	
Conservative	John Burmicz	836	41.1	
Conservative	Angela Alder	832	40.9	
Independent	David Royle	744	36.6	
Liberal Democrats	Annelise Berendt Furnace	728	35.8	
Liberal Democrats	Julia Davies	309	15.2	
Liberal Democrats	Paul Breach	271	13.3	
Labour	Susan Hills	236	11.6	
Labour	Colette Slater	194	9.5	
Registered electors		6,723		
Rejected ballots		37	1.8	
Turnout		2071	30.8	
Conservative hold		Swing		
Conservative hold		Swing		
Conservative hold		Swing		

=== Stanstead Abbotts ===
Stanstead Abbotts (2 seats)
Party	Candidate	Votes	%	±%
Liberal Democrats	Joseph Dumont	315	42.6	+25.8
Conservative	Michael Allen	240	32.4	−32.3
Green	Nicholas Cox	118	15.9	−2.6
Labour	Sarah Chapman	67	9.1	N/A
Registered electors		2,306		
Rejected ballots		11	1.5	
Turnout		751	32.57	
Liberal Democrats gain from Conservative		Swing		

=== Thundridge and Standon ===
Thundridge and Standon (1 seat)
Party	Candidate	Votes	%	±%
Conservative	David Andrews	473	61.6	−16.4
Green	Robert Street	229	29.8	N/A
Labour	Jack Kidston	66	8.6	−13.4
Registered electors		2,455		
Rejected ballots		21	2.7	
Turnout		789	32.14	
Conservative hold		Swing		

=== Walkern ===
Walkern (1 seat)
Party	Candidate	Votes	%	±%
Conservative	Ken Crofton	Unopposed	N/A	−77.5
Turnout		N/A	N/A	
Conservative hold		Swing		

=== Ware Chadwell ===
Ware Chadwell (1 seat)
Party	Candidate	Votes	%	±%
Conservative	Mark Pope	387	52.4	−14.8
Green	Thomas Day	182	24.6	+11.6
Labour	Joshua Dean	170	23.0	+3.2
Registered electors		2,460		
Rejected ballots		16	2.1	
Turnout		755	30.69	
Conservative hold		Swing		

=== Ware Christchurch ===
Ware Christchurch (2 seats)
Party	Candidate	Votes	%	±%
Conservative	Jonathan Kaye	486	43.8	
Conservative	Rishi Fernando	420	37.8	
Green	Glen Baker	372	33.5	
Liberal Democrats	Victoria Shaw	367	33.1	
Labour	Fay Adams	195	17.6	
Labour	Robert Pinkham	158	14.2	
Registered electors		4,138		
Rejected ballots		26	2.3	
Turnout		1136	27.45	
Conservative hold		Swing		
Conservative hold		Swing		

=== Ware St Mary's ===
Ware St Mary's (2 seats)
Party	Candidate	Votes	%	±%
Conservative	Ian Kemp	527	48.3	
Conservative	Judith Ranger	453	41.5	
Green	Martin Butcher	336	30.8	
Green	David Short	246	22.5	
Liberal Democrats	Paul Heuvelmans	182	16.7	
Labour	Graham MacArthur	178	16.3	
Labour	Brian Rogers	124	11.4	
Registered electors		4,010		
Rejected ballots		19	1.7	
Turnout		1111	27.71	
Conservative hold		Swing		
Conservative hold		Swing		

=== Ware Trinity ===
Ware Trinity (2 seats)
Party	Candidate	Votes	%	±%
Green	James Frecknall	469	42.1	
Conservative	Stephen Reed	402	36.1	
Conservative	Nina Villa	357	32.1	
Liberal Democrats	Sean Shaw	333	29.9	
Labour	Alan Wilkins	198	17.8	
Independent	Geoffrey Miles	158	14.2	
Registered electors		4,017		
Rejected ballots		8	0.7	
Turnout		1121	27.91	
Green gain from Conservative		Swing		
Conservative hold		Swing		

=== Watton-at-Stone ===
Watton-at-Stone (1 seat)
Party	Candidate	Votes	%	±%
Liberal Democrats	Sophie Bell	583	70.9	N/A
Conservative	Adam Compton	239	29.1	−37.3
Registered electors		1,990		
Rejected ballots		14	1.7	
Turnout		836	42.01	
Liberal Democrats gain from Conservative		Swing		

== Changes 2019–2023 ==
=== By-elections ===
==== Bishop's Stortford All Saints ====
Bishop's Stortford All Saints: 6 May 2021
Party	Candidate	Votes	%	±%
Liberal Democrats	Richard George Victor Townsend	1,194	49.6	
Conservative	Shane Manning	821	34.1	
Labour	Thomas Alfred Diamond	392	16.3	
Majority		373	15.5	
Registered electors		5,957		
Rejected ballots		25	1.0	
Turnout		2,432	40.83	
Liberal Democrats hold		Swing		

The by-election was triggered by the resignation of the sitting councillor, Louie Corpe, a research physicist who stood down in March 2021 to take up a CERN senior research fellowship developing particle detector technology at the Large Hadron Collider in Geneva.
