= 2007 East Hertfordshire District Council election =

2007 UK local government election

Map of the results

The 2007 East Hertfordshire District Council election took place on 3 May 2007 to elect members of East Hertfordshire District Council in Hertfordshire, England, coinciding with other local government elections taking place across the country. The Conservative Party remained in overall control of the council, having held a majority since 1999.

Being a traditionally Conservative district council in the East of England, it was presented with many of the issues with the first-past-the-post system. This included uncontested seats, unrepresented parties and some other disproportionate gains.

== Electoral results ==
East Hertfordshire District Council election, 2007
Party	Seats	Gains	Losses	Net gain/loss	Seats %	Votes %	Votes	+/−
Conservative	42	1	0	▲1	84.0	47.6	17,199	-2.6
Liberal Democrats	4	0	3	▼3	8.0	19.0	6,875	-4.5
Independent	4	2	0	▲2	8.0	17.8	6,409	+12.6
Labour	0	0	0	Steady	0.0	11.0	3,988	-7.5
Green	0	0	0	Steady	0.0	2.8	1,022	+0.2
BNP	0	0	0	Steady	0.0	1.0	378	New
UKIP	0	0	0	Steady	0.0	0.6	230	New

== Results by ward (A-Z) ==
=== Bishop's Stortford All Saints (3) ===
Bishop's Stortford All Saints
Party	Candidate	Votes	%
Liberal Democrats	Michael Wood*	1,062	49.2
Conservative	Colin Woodward	1,042	48.3
Liberal Democrats	Andy Graham*	984	45.6
Conservative	Charles Jackson	965	44.7
Conservative	Keith Warnell	896	41.5
Liberal Democrats	Les Pinnell*	871	40.4
Independent	Eric Marshall	405	18.8
Labour	Dian Mitchell	245	11.4
Turnout		2157	N/A
Liberal Democrats hold			
Conservative gain from Liberal Democrats			
Liberal Democrats hold			

=== Bishop's Stortford Central (3) ===
Bishop's Stortford Central
Party	Candidate	Votes	%
Liberal Democrats	Mione Goldspink*	994	44.6
Independent	Keith Barnes*	967	43.4
Liberal Democrats	Bob Taylor	872	39.1
Conservative	Leanda Newlyn	715	32.1
Conservative	Timothy Page	709	31.8
Conservative	John Wyllie	642	28.8
BNP	Dave King	378	17.0
BNP	Clive Johnson	370	16.6
Green	Graham White	368	16.5
Labour	John Battersby	347	15.6
BNP	Geoff Rose	327	14.7
Turnout		2230	N/A
Liberal Democrats hold			
Independent hold			
Liberal Democrats hold			

=== Bishop's Stortford Meads (2) ===
Bishop's Stortford Meads
Party	Candidate	Votes	%
Conservative	Ralph Gilbert*	827	58.0
Conservative	Jill Demonti*	815	57.1
Liberal Democrats	Calvin Horner	555	38.9
Liberal Democrats	Julio Rosa	453	31.7
Labour	Paul Schroder	204	14.3
Turnout		1427	N/A
Conservative hold			
Conservative hold			

=== Bishop's Stortford Silverleys (2) ===
Bishop's Stortford Silverleys
Party	Candidate	Votes	%
Conservative	Graham McAndrew*	883	73.0
Conservative	Duncan Peek*	867	71.7
Liberal Democrats	Nigel Cryer	438	36.2
Labour	Leslie Tillbrook	229	18.9
Turnout		1209	N/A
Conservative hold			
Conservative hold			
