= 2015 East Hertfordshire District Council election =

2015 UK local government election

Map of the results

The 2015 East Hertfordshire District Council election took place on 7 May 2015 to elect members of the East Hertfordshire District Council in England. It was held on the same day as other local elections.

== Result summary ==
East Hertfordshire District Council election, 2015
Party	Seats	Gains	Losses	Net gain/loss	Seats %	Votes %	Votes	+/−
Conservative	50	4	0	▲4	100.0	58.8	73,220	+5.9
Labour	0	0	0	Steady	0.0	17.4	21,668	-2.8
Green	0	0	0	Steady	0.0	8.7	10,830	New
UKIP	0	0	0	Steady	0.0	7.4	9,253	New
Liberal Democrats	0	0	2	▼2	0.0	5.9	12,046	-6.8
Independent	0	0	2	▼2	0.0	1.8	2,229	-12.1
