= Eastbury, Hertfordshire =

Coordinates: 51.6232°N 0.4192°W

Eastbury
- Location within Hertfordshire
- OS grid reference: TQ094928
- Civil parish: Batchworth
- District: Three Rivers
- Shire county: Hertfordshire
- Region: East
- Country: England
- Sovereign state: United Kingdom
- Post town: NORTHWOOD
- Postcode district: HA6
- Dialling code: 01923
- Police: Hertfordshire
- Fire: Hertfordshire
- Ambulance: East of England

Eastbury is a settlement in the Three Rivers district of Hertfordshire, adjacent to the Greater London suburb of Northwood in Hillingdon. Other settlements nearby include Moor Park and South Oxhey, and Eastbury is about equal distance between the Northwood and Moor Park tube stations (Metropolitan line). Northwood Headquarters is in Eastbury. The post town is Northwood. It is in the Three Rivers Ward of Moor Park and Eastbury, and since 1 April 2017, the civil parish of Batchworth.

Eastbury is served by Eastbury Farm JMI School. This was rated in 2007 as Outstanding by Ofsted and is one of the top 1% primary schools in England.
