= 2023 Three Rivers District Council election =

2023 UK local government election

| ← 2022 | 4 May 2023 | 2024 → |

14 out of 39 seats to Three Rivers District Council 20 seats needed for a majority

| | First party | Second party | Third party |
|---|---|---|---|
| Leader | Sarah Nelmes | Ciarán Reed | Stephen Cox |
| Party | Liberal Democrats | Conservative | Labour |
| Last election | 22 seats, 43.5% | 12 seats, 31.9% | 3 seats, 14.0% |
| Seats before | 22 | 11 | 3 |
| Seats won | 8 | 4 | 1 |
| Seats after | 22 | 11 | 3 |
| Seat change | Steady | Steady | Steady |
| Popular vote | 9,940 | 7,701 | 3,300 |
| Percentage | 41.9% | 32.5% | 13.9% |
| Swing | ▼1.6% | ▲0.6% | ▼0.1% |
| | Fourth party | Fifth party |
| Party | Green | Independent |
| Last election | 1 seat, 10.3% | N/A |
| Seats before | 1 | 2 |
| Seats won | 1 | 0 |
| Seats after | 2 | 1 |
| Seat change | ▲1 | ▼1 |
| Popular vote | 2,789 | 0 |
| Percentage | 11.8% | 0.0% |
| Swing | ▲1.5% | N/A |
- Winner of each seat at the 2023 Three Rivers District Council election
Leader before election
Sarah Nelmes
Liberal Democrats
Leader after election
Sarah Nelmes
Liberal Democrats

The 2023 Three Rivers District Council election took place on 4 May 2023 to elect members of Three Rivers District Council in Hertfordshire, England. This was on the same day as other local elections across England. There were 14 seats up for election, being the usual third of the council plus a by-election in the Chorleywood South and Maple Cross ward.

The Liberal Democrats retained their majority on the council.

== Summary ==
=== Election result ===
The overall results were:

2023 Three Rivers District Council election
| Party | This election | | | Full council | | | This election | | |
| Party | Seats | Net | Seats % | Other | Total | Total % | Votes | Votes % | +/− |
|---|---|---|---|---|---|---|---|---|---|
| Liberal Democrats | 8 | Steady | 57.1 | 14 | 22 | 56.4 | 9,940 | 41.9 | –1.6 |
| Conservative | 4 | Steady | 28.6 | 7 | 11 | 28.2 | 7,701 | 32.5 | +0.6 |
| Labour | 1 | Steady | 7.1 | 2 | 3 | 7.7 | 3,300 | 13.9 | –0.1 |
| Green | 1 | ▲1 | 7.1 | 1 | 2 | 5.1 | 2,789 | 11.8 | +1.5 |
| Independent | 0 | ▼1 | 0.0 | 1 | 1 | 2.6 | | | |

== Ward results ==
The Statement of Persons Nominated, which details the candidates standing in each ward, was released by Three Rivers District Council following the close of nominations on 5 April 2023. The results for each ward were as follows:

=== Abbots Langley and Bedmond ===
Abbots Langley and Bedmond
| Party | Candidate | Votes | % | ±% |
|---|---|---|---|---|
| Liberal Democrats | David Major* | 888 | 54.2 | –3.1 |
| Conservative | David Pollard | 438 | 26.7 | +3.4 |
| Labour | James Farrington | 214 | 13.1 | +0.4 |
| Green | Michael Rayment | 98 | 6.0 | –0.6 |
| Majority | | 450 | 27.5 | –6.5 |
| Turnout | | 1,638 | 33.3 | +1.1 |
| Registered electors | | 4,955 | | |
| Liberal Democrats hold | | Swing | ▼3.3 | |

=== Carpenders Park ===
Carpenders Park
| Party | Candidate | Votes | % | ±% |
|---|---|---|---|---|
| Conservative | Ian Morris | 1,021 | 61.8 | +11.9 |
| Labour | William Waite | 381 | 23.1 | –0.4 |
| Liberal Democrats | Pam Hames | 188 | 11.4 | –6.5 |
| Green | Kelsey Trevett | 62 | 3.8 | –1.0 |
| Majority | | 640 | 38.7 | +12.3 |
| Turnout | | 1,652 | 31.6 | +3.1 |
| Registered electors | | 5,245 | | |
| Conservative hold | | Swing | ▲6.2 | |

=== Chorleywood North and Sarratt ===
Chorleywood North and Sarratt
| Party | Candidate | Votes | % | ±% |
|---|---|---|---|---|
| Conservative | Oliver Cooper | 1,081 | 58.8 | +3.3 |
| Liberal Democrats | Frank Mahon-Daly | 517 | 28.1 | –4.3 |
| Green | Peter Loader | 130 | 7.1 | +0.6 |
| Labour | Margaret Gallagher | 111 | 6.0 | +0.5 |
| Majority | | 564 | 30.7 | +7.6 |
| Turnout | | 1,479 | 26.0 | –2.9 |
| Registered electors | | 5,681 | | |
| Conservative hold | | Swing | ▲3.8 | |

=== Chorleywood South and Maple Cross ===
Chorleywood South and Maple Cross (2 seats due to by-election)
| Party | Candidate | Votes | % | ±% |
|---|---|---|---|---|
| Liberal Democrats | Raj Khiroya* | 1,125 | 56.4 | +3.0 |
| Liberal Democrats | Louise Price | 1,097 | 55.0 | +1.6 |
| Conservative | Salem Al-Damluji | 587 | 29.4 | –2.9 |
| Conservative | Divya Thakar | 514 | 25.8 | –6.5 |
| Green | Roger Stafford | 218 | 10.9 | +3.4 |
| Labour | Iain Roden | 194 | 9.7 | +2.9 |
| Labour | Colin Gray | 126 | 6.3 | –0.5 |
| Turnout | | 1,995 | 34.7 | +0.3 |
| Registered electors | | 5,749 | | |
| Liberal Democrats hold | | | | |
| Liberal Democrats hold | | | | |

The by-election in Chorleywood South and Maple Cross ward had been triggered by the resignation of Liberal Democrat councillor Martin Trevett, who had been elected in 2022.

=== Dickinsons ===
Dickinsons
| Party | Candidate | Votes | % | ±% |
|---|---|---|---|---|
| Green | Narinder Sian | 1,171 | 54.9 | +9.2 |
| Liberal Democrats | Tom Smith | 852 | 39.9 | –2.9 |
| Labour | Jeni Swift Gillett | 110 | 5.2 | +2.4 |
| Majority | | 319 | 15.0 | +12.1 |
| Turnout | | 2,133 | 42.8 | –0.1 |
| Registered electors | | 5,036 | | |
| Green gain from Liberal Democrats | | Swing | ▲6.1 | |

=== Durrants ===
Durrants
| Party | Candidate | Votes | % | ±% |
|---|---|---|---|---|
| Liberal Democrats | Jonathon Solomons | 989 | 55.7 | –8.6 |
| Green | Angus Glasser | 442 | 24.9 | +14.2 |
| Conservative | Gordon Elvey | 232 | 13.1 | –5.5 |
| Labour | John Grillo | 114 | 6.4 | ±0.0 |
| Majority | | 547 | 30.8 | –14.9 |
| Turnout | | 1,777 | 36.1 | +0.3 |
| Registered electors | | 4,946 | | |
| Liberal Democrats gain from Independent | | Swing | ▼11.4 | |

The Durrants seat had previously been held by Stephanie Singer, who had been elected as Liberal Democrat in 2019 but resigned from the party earlier in 2023 and sat as an independent for the remainder of her term.

=== Gade Valley ===
Gade Valley
| Party | Candidate | Votes | % | ±% |
|---|---|---|---|---|
| Liberal Democrats | Chris Whately-Smith | 704 | 52.3 | +3.2 |
| Conservative | Vicky Edwards | 334 | 24.8 | +2.6 |
| Labour | Bruce Prochnik | 235 | 17.5 | –0.2 |
| Green | Kenneth Gallagher | 72 | 5.4 | –5.5 |
| Majority | | 370 | 27.5 | N/A |
| Turnout | | 1,345 | 27.1 | –2.9 |
| Registered electors | | 4,993 | | |
| Liberal Democrats hold | | Swing | ▲0.3 | |

=== Leavesden ===
Leavesden
| Party | Candidate | Votes | % | ±% |
|---|---|---|---|---|
| Liberal Democrats | Jon Tankard | 853 | 54.0 | –3.2 |
| Conservative | Anne Jervis | 396 | 25.0 | +3.3 |
| Labour | Marie-Louise Nolan | 253 | 16.0 | –0.1 |
| Green | Bruce Perry | 79 | 5.0 | ±0.0 |
| Majority | | 457 | 29.0 | –6.4 |
| Turnout | | 1,581 | 27.3 | +0.6 |
| Registered electors | | 5,805 | | |
| Liberal Democrats hold | | Swing | ▼3.3 | |

=== Moor Park and Eastbury ===
Moor Park and Eastbury
| Party | Candidate | Votes | % | ±% |
|---|---|---|---|---|
| Conservative | Reena Ranger* | 1,054 | 73.1 | +4.7 |
| Liberal Democrats | Laura Thompson | 210 | 14.6 | –2.6 |
| Labour | Mashkoor Khan | 102 | 7.1 | –0.8 |
| Green | Stephen Martin | 75 | 5.2 | –1.0 |
| Majority | | 844 | 58.5 | +7.6 |
| Turnout | | 1,441 | 32.2 | +2.5 |
| Registered electors | | 4,496 | | |
| Conservative hold | | Swing | ▲3.7 | |

=== Oxhey Hall and Hayling ===
Oxhey Hall and Hayling
| Party | Candidate | Votes | % | ±% |
|---|---|---|---|---|
| Liberal Democrats | Keith Martin* | 915 | 53.1 | –5.2 |
| Labour | Clare Leahy | 391 | 22.7 | +3.8 |
| Conservative | Ameer Ahmad | 345 | 20.0 | +1.2 |
| Green | Mary Chabrel | 73 | 4.2 | +0.1 |
| Majority | | 524 | 30.4 | –9.0 |
| Turnout | | 1,724 | 32.9 | +1.7 |
| Registered electors | | 5,293 | | |
| Liberal Democrats hold | | Swing | ▼4.5 | |

=== Penn and Mill End ===
Penn and Mill End
| Party | Candidate | Votes | % | ±% |
|---|---|---|---|---|
| Liberal Democrats | Tony Humphreys* | 730 | 49.6 | –1.8 |
| Conservative | Mike Sims | 474 | 32.2 | –1.5 |
| Labour | Martin Waldron | 157 | 10.7 | +1.5 |
| Green | Deesha Chandra | 110 | 7.5 | +1.8 |
| Majority | | 256 | 17.4 | –0.3 |
| Turnout | | 1,471 | 28.8 | –1.1 |
| Registered electors | | 5,142 | | |
| Liberal Democrats hold | | Swing | ▼0.2 | |

=== Rickmansworth Town ===
Rickmansworth Town
| Party | Candidate | Votes | % | ±% |
|---|---|---|---|---|
| Conservative | David Raw* | 901 | 43.0 | –4.2 |
| Liberal Democrats | Peter Harman | 785 | 37.5 | +5.1 |
| Labour | Janet Cullen | 215 | 10.3 | –0.9 |
| Green | Cheryl Stungo | 192 | 9.2 | –0.1 |
| Majority | | 116 | 5.5 | –9.3 |
| Turnout | | 2,093 | 37.8 | +3.5 |
| Registered electors | | 5,560 | | |
| Conservative hold | | Swing | ▼4.7 | |

=== South Oxhey ===
South Oxhey
| Party | Candidate | Votes | % | ±% |
|---|---|---|---|---|
| Labour | Stephen Cox* | 697 | 59.3 | –2.0 |
| Conservative | Christopher Alley | 324 | 27.6 | –0.2 |
| Liberal Democrats | Rhys Southall | 87 | 7.4 | +2.2 |
| Green | Chris Lawrence | 67 | 5.7 | +0.1 |
| Majority | | 373 | 31.7 | –1.8 |
| Turnout | | 1,175 | 22.2 | –1.2 |
| Registered electors | | 5,335 | | |
| Labour hold | | Swing | ▼0.9 | |

== By-elections ==
=== Chorleywood South and Maple Cross ===
Chorleywood South and Maple Cross: 14 December 2023
| Party | Candidate | Votes | % | ±% |
|---|---|---|---|---|
| Liberal Democrats | Harry Davies | 694 | 57.5 | +4.6 |
| Conservative | Oliver Neville | 355 | 29.4 | +1.8 |
| Green | Roger Stafford | 102 | 8.4 | −1.8 |
| Labour | Martin Waldron | 55 | 4.6 | −4.6 |
| Majority | | 339 | 28.1 | N/A |
| Turnout | | 1,206 | 21.4 | −13.3 |
| Registered electors | | 5,659 | | |
| Liberal Democrats hold | | Swing | +1.4 | |
