= Eastbury =

Eastbury may refer to:

- Eastbury, Berkshire
  - Eastbury Halt railway station
- Eastbury, Hertfordshire
- Eastbury Community School, Barking and Dagenham, London
- Eastbury Farm JMI School, Three Rivers District, Hertfordshire
- Eastbury Manor House, Barking and Dagenham, London
- Eastbury Park, a demolished manor house, and Eastbury House, its surviving service wing, in Dorset
- Eastbury Park, Northwood, a demolished estate in London
