= List of electoral wards in Hertfordshire =

This is a list of electoral divisions and wards in the ceremonial county of Hertfordshire in the East of England. All changes since the re-organisation of local government following the passing of the Local Government Act 1972 are shown. The number of councillors elected for each electoral division or ward is shown in brackets.

== County council ==
=== Hertfordshire ===
Electoral Divisions from 1 April 1974 (first election 12 April 1973) to 7 May 1981:

1. Baldock (1)
2. Bishops Stortford (Eastern) (1)
3. Bishops Stortford (Western) (1)
4. Braughing (1)
5. Bushey No. 1 (North) (1)
6. Bushey No. 2 (Heath) (1)
7. Cheshunt (Central) (1)
8. Cheshunt (North West) (1)
9. Cheshunt (South East) (1)
10. Chorleywood (1)
11. Elstree (North) (1)
12. Elstree (South) (1)
13. Gaddesden (1)
14. Great Berkhamsted (1)
15. Harpenden (North) (1)
16. Harpenden (South) (1)
17. Hatfield (East) (1)
18. Hatfield (West) (1)
19. Hemel Hempstead No. 1 (1)
20. Hemel Hempstead No. 2 (2)
21. Hemel Hempstead No. 3 (2)
22. Hertford (All Saints) (1)
23. Hertford (Rural) (1)
24. Hertford (St Andrews) (1)
25. Hitchin (East) (1)
26. Hitchin (West) (1)
27. Hoddesdon (North) (1)
28. Hoddesdon (South) (1)
29. Kimpton (1)
30. Kings Langley (1)
31. Knebworth (1)
32. Letchworth (East) (1)
33. Letchworth (West) (1)
34. North Mymms (1)
35. Potters Bar (East) (1)
36. Potters Bar (West) (1)
37. Rickmansworth (East) (1)
38. Rickmansworth (West) (1)
39. Royston (1)
40. Sawbridgeworth (1)
41. St Albans (East) (1)
42. St Albans (North) (1)
43. St Albans (South) (1)
44. St Albans (West) (1)
45. St Albans Rural No. 1 (Colney Heat (1)
46. St Albans Rural No. 2 (Wheathampst (1)
47. St Albans Rural No. 3 (1)
48. Stevenage No. 1 (2)
49. Stevenage No. 2 (Bedwell) (1)
50. Stevenage No. 3 (Old Stevenage) (1)
51. Stevenage No. 4 (Pin Green) (1)
52. Tring (1)
53. Ware (1)
54. Ware Rural (1)
55. Watford (Garston & Knutsford) (1)
56. Watford (Harebreaks & Bradshaw) (1)
57. Watford (Harwoods) (1)
58. Watford (Kings & Oxhey) (1)
59. Watford (Leavesden) (1)
60. Watford (Queens) (1)
61. Watford (St Andrews & Cassiobury) (1)
62. Watford Rural No. 1 (Aldenham) (1)
63. Watford Rural No. 2 (1)
64. Watford Rural No. 3 (1)
65. Watford Rural No. 4 (1)
66. Welwyn (1)
67. Welwyn Garden City (North) (1)
68. Welwyn Garden City (West) (1)
69. Welwyn Garden City (South) (1)

Electoral Divisions from 7 May 1981 to 7 June 2001:

1. Abbotts Langley (1)
2. All Saints (1)
3. Bedwell (1)
4. Berkhamsted (1)
5. Bishops Stortford Central Parsonag (1)
6. Bishops Stortford Chantry Thorley (1)
7. Braughing (1)
8. Bridgewater (1)
9. Broadwater (1)
10. Bushey Heath (1)
11. Bushey North (1)
12. Callowland Leggatts (1)
13. Central Oxhey (1)
14. Chells (1)
15. Cheshunt Central (1)
16. Cheshunt North (1)
17. Cheshunt West (1)
18. Chorleywood (1)
19. Croxley (1)
20. Elstree (1)
21. Haldens (1)
22. Harpenden North East (1)
23. Harpenden South West (1)
24. Hatfield East (1)
25. Hatfield North (1)
26. Hatfield South (1)
27. Hemel Hempstead East (1)
28. Hemel Hempstead North East (1)
29. Hemel Hempstead North West (1)
30. Hemel Hempstead South East (1)
31. Hemel Hempstead St Pauls (1)
32. Hemel Hempstead Town (1)
33. Hertford Rural (1)
34. Hitchin North East (1)
35. Hitchin South (1)
36. Hoddesdon North (1)
37. Hoddesdon South (1)
38. Kings Langley (1)
39. Knebworth & Codicote (1)
40. Letchworth East & Baldock (1)
41. Letchworth North West (1)
42. Letchworth South (1)
43. Lyndhurst (1)
44. Meriden Tudor (1)
45. Nascot Park (1)
46. North Herts Rural (1)
47. North Mymms (1)
48. Offa (1)
49. Old Stevenage (1)
50. Oxhey Park (1)
51. Potters Bar North East (1)
52. Potters Bar South West (1)
53. Rickmansworth (1)
54. Royston (1)
55. Sandridge (1)
56. Sawbridgeworth (1)
57. Shephall (1)
58. South Oxhey (1)
59. St Albans Central (1)
60. St Albans East (1)
61. St Albans North (1)
62. St Albans Rural (1)
63. St Albans South (1)
64. St Andrews (1)
65. St Nicholas (1)
66. St Stephens (1)
67. The Colneys (1)
68. Tring (1)
69. Vicarage Holywell (1)
70. Waltham Cross (1)
71. Ware North (1)
72. Ware South (1)
73. Watling (1)
74. Welwyn (1)
75. Welwyn Garden City South (1)
76. Welwyn Garden City West (1)
77. Woodside Stanborough (1)

Electoral Divisions from 7 June 2001 to 4 May 2017:

1. Abbots Langley (1)
2. All Saints (1)
3. Bedwell (1)
4. Berkhamsted (1)
5. Bishop’s Stortford East (1)
6. Bishop’s Stortford Rural (1)
7. Bishop’s Stortford West (1)
8. Borehamwood North (1)
9. Borehamwood South (1)
10. Braughing (1)
11. Bridgewater (1)
12. Broadwater (1)
13. Bushey North (1)
14. Bushey South (1)
15. Callowland Leggatts (1)
16. Central Oxhey (1)
17. Chells (1)
18. Cheshunt Central (1)
19. Chorleywood (1)
20. Croxley (1)
21. Flamstead End & Turnford (1)
22. Goffs Oak & Bury Green (1)
23. Haldens (1)
24. Handside & Peartree (1)
25. Harpenden North East (1)
26. Harpenden South West (1) †
27. Hatfield North (1)
28. Hatfield Rural (1)
29. Hatfield South (1)
30. Hemel Hempstead East (1)
31. Hemel Hempstead North East (1)
32. Hemel Hempstead North West (1)
33. Hemel Hempstead South East (1)
34. Hemel Hempstead St Paul's (1)
35. Hemel Hempstead Town (1)
36. Hertford Rural (1)
37. Hitchin North (1)
38. Hitchin Rural (1)
39. Hitchin South (1)
40. Hoddesdon North (1)
41. Hoddesdon South (1)
42. Kings Langley (1)
43. Knebworth & Codicote (1)
44. Letchworth East & Baldock (1)
45. Letchworth North West (1)
46. Letchworth South (1)
47. Meriden Tudor (1)
48. Nascot Park (1)
49. North Herts Rural (1)
50. Old Stevenage (1)
51. Oxhey Park (1)
52. Potters Bar East (1)
53. Potters Bar West & Shenley (1)
54. Rickmansworth (1)
55. Royston (1)
56. Sandridge (1)
57. Sawbridgeworth (1)
58. Shephall (1)
59. South Oxhey (1)
60. St Albans Central (1)
61. St Albans East (1)
62. St Albans North (1)
63. St Albans Rural (1) †
64. St Albans South (1)
65. St Andrew's (1)
66. St Nicholas (1)
67. St Stephen's (1)
68. The Colneys (1)
69. Tring (1)
70. Vicarage Holywell (1)
71. Waltham Cross (1)
72. Ware North (1)
73. Ware South (1)
74. Watling (1)
75. Welwyn (1)
76. Welwyn Garden City South (1)
77. Woodside Stanborough (1)

† minor boundary changes in 2009

Electoral Divisions from 4 May 2017 to present:

1. Abbots Langley (1)
2. Baldock & Letchworth East (1)
3. Bedwell (1)
4. Berkhamsted (1)
5. Bishops Stortford East (1)
6. Bishops Stortford Rural (1)
7. Bishops Stortford West (1)
8. Borehamwood North (1)
9. Borehamwood South (1)
10. Bridgewater (1)
11. Broadwater (1)
12. Buntingford (1)
13. Bushey North (1)
14. Bushey South (1)
15. Central Watford & Oxhey (1)
16. Chells (1)
17. Cheshunt Central (1)
18. Colney Heath & Marshalswick (1)
19. Croxley (1)
20. Flamstead End & Turnford (1)
21. Goffs Oak & Bury Green (1)
22. Haldens (1)
23. Handside & Peartree (1)
24. Harpenden North East (1)
25. Harpenden Rural (1)
26. Harpenden South West (1)
27. Hatfield East (1)
28. Hatfield North (1)
29. Hatfield Rural (1)
30. Hatfield South (1)
31. Hemel Hempstead East (1)
32. Hemel Hempstead North East (1)
33. Hemel Hempstead North West (1)
34. Hemel Hempstead South East (1)
35. Hemel Hempstead St Pauls (1)
36. Hemel Hempstead Town (1)
37. Hertford All Saints (1)
38. Hertford Rural (1)
39. Hertford St Andrews (1)
40. Hitchin North (1)
41. Hitchin Rural (1)
42. Hitchin South (1)
43. Hoddesdon North (1)
44. Hoddesdon South (1)
45. Kings Langley (1)
46. Knebworth & Codicote (1)
47. Letchworth North (1)
48. Letchworth South (1)
49. London Colney (1)
50. Meriden Tudor (1)
51. Nascot Park (1)
52. North Watford (1)
53. Old Stevenage (1)
54. Potters Bar East (1)
55. Potters Bar West & Shenley (1)
56. Rickmansworth East & Oxhey Park (1)
57. Rickmansworth West (1)
58. Royston East & Ermine (1)
59. Royston West & Rural (1)
60. Sawbridgeworth (1)
61. Shephall (1)
62. South Oxhey & Eastbury (1)
63. St Albans Central (1)
64. St Albans East (1)
65. St Albans North (1)
66. St Albans South (1)
67. St Nicholas (1)
68. St Stephen’s (1)
69. Three Rivers Rural (1)
70. Tring (1)
71. Waltham Cross (1)
72. Ware North (1)
73. Ware South (1)
74. Watling (1)
75. Welwyn (1)
76. Welwyn Garden City South (1)
77. West Watford (1)
78. Woodside Stanborough (1)

== District councils ==
=== Broxbourne ===
Wards from 1 April 1974 (first election 7 June 1973) to 6 May 1976:

Wards from 6 May 1976 to 6 May 1999:

Wards from 6 May 1999 to 3 May 2012:

1. Broxbourne (3)
2. Bury Green (3)
3. Cheshunt Central (3)
4. Cheshunt North (3)
5. Flamstead End (3)
6. Goffs Oak (3)
7. Hoddesdon North (3)
8. Hoddesdon Town (3)
9. Rosedale (2)
10. Rye Park (3)
11. Theobalds (3)
12. Waltham Cross (3)
13. Wormley & Turnford (3)

Wards from 3 May 2012 to present:

1. Broxbourne & Hoddesdon South (3)
2. Cheshunt North (3)
3. Cheshunt South & Theobalds (3)
4. Flamstead End (3)
5. Goffs Oak (3)
6. Hoddesdon North (3)
7. Hoddesdon Town & Rye Park (3)
8. Rosedale & Bury Green (3)
9. Waltham Cross (3)
10. Wormley & Turnford (3)

=== Dacorum ===
Wards from 1 April 1974 (first election 7 June 1973) to 3 May 1979:

Wards from 3 May 1979 to 6 May 1999:

Wards from 6 May 1999 to 3 May 2007:

1. Adeyfield East (2)
2. Adeyfield West (2)
3. Aldbury & Wigginton (1)
4. Apsley (1)
5. Ashridge (1)
6. Bennetts End (2)
7. Berkhamsted Castle (2)
8. Berkhamsted East (2)
9. Berkhamsted West (2)
10. Bovingdon, Flaunden & Chipperfield (3)
11. Boxmoor (2)
12. Chaulden & Shrubhill (2)
13. Corner Hall (2)
14. Gadebridge (2)
15. Grove Hill (3)
16. Hemel Hempstead Central (2)
17. Highfield & St Pauls (3)
18. Kings Langley (2)
19. Leverstock Green (3)
20. Nash Mills (1)
21. Northchurch (1)
22. Tring Central (2)
23. Tring East (1)
24. Tring West (2)
25. Warners End (2)
26. Watling (2)
27. Woodhall (2)

Wards from 3 May 2007 to present:

1. Adeyfield East (2)
2. Adeyfield West (2)
3. Aldbury & Wigginton (1)
4. Apsley & Corner Hall (3)
5. Ashridge (1)
6. Bennetts End (2)
7. Berkhamsted Castle (2)
8. Berkhamsted East (2)
9. Berkhamsted West (2)
10. Bovingdon, Flaunden & Chipperfield (3)
11. Boxmoor (3)
12. Chaulden & Warners End (3)
13. Gadebridge (2)
14. Grovehill (3)
15. Hemel Hempstead Town (2)
16. Highfield (2)
17. Kings Langley (2)
18. Leverstock Green (3)
19. Nash Mills (1)
20. Northchurch (1)
21. Tring Central (2)
22. Tring East (1)
23. Tring West & Rural (2)
24. Watling (2)
25. Woodhall Farm (2)

=== East Hertfordshire ===
Wards from 1 April 1974 (first election 7 June 1973) to 3 May 1979:

Wards from 3 May 1979 to 6 May 1999:

Wards from 6 May 1999 to 4 May 2023:

1. Bishop’s Stortford All Saints (3)
2. Bishop’s Stortford Central (3)
3. Bishop’s Stortford Meads (2)
4. Bishop’s Stortford Silverleys (2)
5. Bishop’s Stortford South (3)
6. Braughing (1)
7. Buntingford (2)
8. Datchworth & Aston (1)
9. Great Amwell (1)
10. Hertford Bengeo (3)
11. Hertford Castle (3)
12. Hertford Heath (1)
13. Hertford Kingsmead (2)
14. Hertford Rural North (1)
15. Hertford Rural South (1)
16. Hertford Sele (2)
17. Hunsdon (1)
18. Little Hadham (1)
19. Mundens & Cottered (1)
20. Much Hadham (1)
21. Puckeridge (1)
22. Sawbridgeworth (3)
23. Stanstead Abbots (1)
24. Thundridge & Standon (1)
25. Walkern (1)
26. Ware Chadwell (1)
27. Ware Christchurch (2)
28. Ware St Mary's (2)
29. Ware Trinity (2)
30. Watton-at-Stone (1)

Wards from 4 May 2023 to present:

1. Aston, Datchworth & Walkern (2)
2. Bishop's Stortford All Saints (2)
3. Bishop's Stortford Central (2)
4. Bishop's Stortford North (3)
5. Bishop's Stortford Parsonage (2)
6. Bishop's Stortford South (2)
7. Bishop's Stortford Thorley Manor (3)
8. Braughing & Standon (2)
9. Buntingford (3)
10. Great Amwell & Stansteads (2)
11. Hertford Bengeo (3)
12. Hertford Castle (2)
13. Hertford Heath & Brickendon (1)
14. Hertford Kingsmead (3)
15. Hertford Rural (1)
16. Hertford Sele (2)
17. Hunsdon (1)
18. Little Hadham & The Pelhams (1)
19. Much Hadham (1)
20. Sawbridgeworth (3)
21. The Mundens (1)
22. Ware Priory (2)
23. Ware Rural (1)
24. Ware St Mary's (2)
25. Ware Trinity (2)
26. Watton-at-Stone (1)

=== Hertsmere ===
Wards from 1 April 1974 (first election 7 June 1973) to 6 May 1976:

Wards from 6 May 1976 to 6 May 1999:

Wards from 6 May 1999 to 2 May 2019:

1. Aldenham East (2)
2. Aldenham West (2)
3. Borehamwood Brookmeadow (3)
4. Borehamwood Cowley Hill (3)
5. Borehamwood Hillside (3)
6. Borehamwood Kenilworth (2)
7. Bushey Heath (3)
8. Bushey North (3)
9. Bushey Park (2)
10. Bushey St James (3)
11. Elstree (2)
12. Potters Bar Furzefield (3)
13. Potters Bar Oakmere (3)
14. Potters Bar Parkfield (3)
15. Shenley (2)

Wards from 2 May 2019 to present:

1. Aldenham East (2)
2. Aldenham West (2)
3. Bentley Heath & The Royds (2)
4. Borehamwood Brookmeadow (3)
5. Borehamwood Cowley Hill (3)
6. Borehamwood Hillside (3)
7. Borehamwood Kenilworth (3)
8. Bushey Heath (2)
9. Bushey North (3)
10. Bushey Park (3)
11. Bushey St James (3)
12. Elstree (2)
13. Potters Bar Furzefield (2)
14. Potters Bar Oakmere (2)
15. Potters Bar Parkfield (2)
16. Shenley (2)

=== North Hertfordshire ===
Wards from 1 April 1974 (first election 7 June 1973) to 3 May 1979:

Wards from 3 May 1979 to 6 May 1999:

Wards from 6 May 1999 to 3 May 2007:

1. Arbury (1)
2. Baldock East (1)
3. Baldock Town (3)
4. Cadwell (1)
5. Codicote (1)
6. Ermine (1)
7. Graveley & Wymondley (1)
8. Hitchin Bearton (3)
9. Hitchin Highbury (3)
10. Hitchin Oughton (2)
11. Hitchin Priory (2)
12. Hitchin Walsworth (3)
13. Hitchwood (1)
14. Hoo (1)
15. Kimpton (1)
16. Knebworth (2)
17. Letchworth East (3)
18. Letchworth Grange (3)
19. Letchworth South East (3)
20. Letchworth South West (3)
21. Letchworth Wilbury (2)
22. Offa (1)
23. Royston Heath (2)
24. Royston Meridian (2)
25. Royston Palace (2)
26. Weston & Sandon (1)

Wards from 3 May 2007 to 2 May 2024:

1. Arbury (1)
2. Baldock East (1)
3. Baldock Town (3)
4. Cadwell (1)
5. Chesfield (2)
6. Codicote (1)
7. Ermine (1)
8. Hitchin Bearton (3)
9. Hitchin Highbury (3)
10. Hitchin Oughton (2)
11. Hitchin Priory (2)
12. Hitchin Walsworth (3)
13. Hitchwood, Offa & Hoo (3)
14. Kimpton (1)
15. Knebworth (2)
16. Letchworth East (2)
17. Letchworth Grange (3)
18. Letchworth South East (3)
19. Letchworth South West (3)
20. Letchworth Wilbury (2)
21. Royston Heath (2)
22. Royston Meridian (2)
23. Royston Palace (2)
24. Weston & Sandon (1)

Wards from 2 May 2024 to present:

1. Arbury (1)
2. Baldock East (2)
3. Baldock West (3)
4. Cadwell (1)
5. Codicote & Kimpton (2)
6. Ermine (1)
7. Graveley, St Ippolyts & Wymondley (2)
8. Great Ashby (2)
9. Hitchin Bearton
10. Hitchin Highbury (2)
11. Hitchin Oughton (2)
12. Hitchin Priory (2)
13. Hitchin Walsworth (3)
14. Hitchwood (1)
15. Knebworth (2)
16. Letchworth Grange (2)
17. Letchworth Norton (2)
18. Letchworth South East (3)
19. Letchworth South West (3)
20. Letchworth Wilbury (2)
21. Offa (2)
22. Royston Heath (2)
23. Royston Meridian (3)
24. Royston Palace (2)
25. Weston & Sandon (1)

=== St Albans ===
Wards from 1 April 1974 (first election 7 June 1973) to 3 May 1979:

Wards from 3 May 1979 to 6 May 1999:

Wards from 6 May 1999 to 5 May 2022:

1. Ashley (3)
2. Batchwood (3)
3. Clarence (3)
4. Colney Heath (2)
5. Cunningham (3)
6. Harpenden East (3)
7. Harpenden North (3)
8. Harpenden South (3) †
9. Harpenden West (3)
10. London Colney (3)
11. Marshalswick North (3)
12. Marshalswick South (3)
13. Park Street (3)
14. Redbourn (3)
15. St Peters (3)
16. St Stephen (3)
17. Sandridge (2)
18. Sopwell (3)
19. Verulam (3)
20. Wheathampstead (3) †

† minor boundary changes in 2007

Wards from 5 May 2022 to present:

1. Batchwood (3)
2. Bernards Heath (3)
3. Clarence (3)
4. Colney Heath (1)
5. Cunningham (3)
6. Harpenden East (3)
7. Harpenden North & Rural (3)
8. Harpenden South (3)
9. Harpenden West (3)
10. Hill End (3)
11. London Colney (3)
12. Marshalswick East & Jersey Farm (3)
13. Marshalswick West (2)
14. Park Street (3)
15. Redbourn (2)
16. Sandridge & Wheathampstead (3)
17. Sopwell (3)
18. St Peters (3)
19. St Stephen (3)
20. Verulam (3)

=== Stevenage ===
Wards from 1 April 1974 (first election 7 June 1973) to 6 May 1976:

1. Broadwater (5)
2. Shephall (6)
3. Bedwell (5)
4. Old Stevenage (6)
5. Chells (5)
6. Pin Green (8)

Wards from 6 May 1976 to 3 May 1979:

1. Broadwater (5)
2. Shephall (6)
3. Bedwell (5)
4. Old Stevenage (5)
5. Chells (5)
6. Pin Green (8)

Wards from 3 May 1979 to 6 May 1999:

1. Bandley Hill (3)
2. Bedwell Plash (3)
3. Chells (2)
4. Longmeadow (3)
5. Martins Wood (3)
6. Mobbsbury (3)
7. Monkswood (3)
8. Old Stevenage (3)
9. Pin Green (3)
10. Roebuck (3)
11. Shephall (3)
12. St Nicholas (3)
13. Symonds Green (3)
14. Wellfield (1)

Wards from 6 May 1999 to 2 May 2024:

1. Bandley Hill (3)
2. Bedwell (3)
3. Chells (3)
4. Longmeadow (3)
5. Manor (3)
6. Martins Wood (3)
7. Old Town (3)
8. Pin Green (3)
9. Roebuck (3)
10. St Nicholas (3)
11. Shephall (3)
12. Symonds Green (3)
13. Woodfield (3)

Wards from 2 May 2024 to present:

1. Almond Hill (3)
2. Bandley Hill & Poplars (3)
3. Bedwell (3)
4. Chells (3)
5. Longmeadow (3)
6. Manor (3)
7. Martins Wood (3)
8. Old Town (3)
9. Roebuck (3)
10. Shephall (3)
11. St Nicholas (3)
12. Symonds Green (3)
13. Woodfield (3)

=== Three Rivers ===
Wards from 1 April 1974 (first election 7 June 1973) to 6 May 1976:

Wards from 6 May 1976 to 6 May 1999:

1. Chorleywood West (2); changed to (3) in 1991

Wards from 6 May 1999 to 22 May 2014:

1. Abbots Langley (3)
2. Ashridge (2)
3. Bedmond and Primrose Hill (2)
4. Carpenders Park (3)
5. Chorleywood East (2)
6. Chorleywood West (3)
7. Croxley Green (3)
8. Croxley Green North (2)
9. Croxley Green South (2)
10. Hayling (2)
11. Langleybury (3)
12. Leavesden (3)
13. Maple Cross and Mill End (3)
14. Moor Park and Eastbury (3)
15. Northwick (3)
16. Oxhey Hall (2)
17. Penn (2)
18. Rickmansworth (2)
19. Rickmansworth West (2)
20. Sarratt (1)

Wards from 22 May 2014 to present:

1. Abbots Langley and Bedmond (3)
2. Carpenders Park (3)
3. Chorleywood North and Sarratt (3)
4. Chorleywood South and Maple Cross (3)
5. Dickinsons (3)
6. Durrants (3)
7. Gade Valley (3)
8. Leavesden (3)
9. Moor Park and Eastbury (3)
10. Oxhey Hall and Hayling (3)
11. Penn and Mill End (3)
12. Rickmansworth Town (3)
13. South Oxhey (3)

=== Watford ===
Wards from 1 April 1974 (first election 7 June 1973) to 6 May 1976:

1. Bradshaw (2)
2. Cassiobury (4)
3. Garston (4)
4. Harebreaks (3)
5. Harwood (3)
6. Kings (2)
7. Knutsford (4)
8. Leavesden (5)
9. Oxhey (3)
10. Queens (2)
11. St. Andrews (4)

Wards from 6 May 1976 to 6 May 1999:

1. Callowland (3)
2. Central (3)
3. Holywell (3)
4. Leggatts (3)
5. Meriden (3)
6. Nascot (3)
7. Oxhey (3)
8. Park (3)
9. Stanborough (3)
10. Tudor (3)
11. Vicarage (3)
12. Woodside (3)

Wards from 6 May 1999 to 5 May 2016:

1. Callowland (3)
2. Central (3)
3. Holywell (3)
4. Leggatts (3)
5. Meriden (3)
6. Nascot (3)
7. Oxhey (3)
8. Park (3)
9. Stanborough (3)
10. Tudor (3)
11. Vicarage (3)
12. Woodside (3)

Wards from 5 May 2016 to present:

1. Callowland (3)
2. Central (3)
3. Holywell (3)
4. Leggatts (3)
5. Meriden (3)
6. Nascot (3)
7. Oxhey (3)
8. Park (3)
9. Stanborough (3)
10. Tudor (3)
11. Vicarage (3)
12. Woodside (3)

=== Welwyn Hatfield ===
Wards from 1 April 1974 (first election 7 June 1973) to 6 May 1976:

Wards from 6 May 1976 to 2 May 1991:

1. Brookmans Park & Little Heath (3)
2. Haldens (3)
3. Handside (3)
4. Hatfield Central (3)
5. Hatfield East (3)
6. Hatfield North (3)
7. Hatfield South (3)
8. Hollybush (3)
9. Howlands (3)
10. Northaw & Chuffley (3)
11. Peartree (3)
12. Sherrards (3)
13. Welham Green & Redhall (3)
14. Welwyn North (2)
15. Welwyn South (2)

Wards from 2 May 1991 to 6 May 1999:

1. Brookmans Park & Little Heath (3)
2. Haldens (3)
3. Handside (3)
4. Hatfield Central (3)
5. Hatfield East (3)
6. Hatfield North (3)
7. Hatfield West (3)
8. Hollybush (3)
9. Howlands (3)
10. Northaw (3)
11. Panshanger (3)
12. Peartree (3)
13. Sherrards (3)
14. Welham Green & Redhall (3)
15. Welwyn North (2)
16. Welwyn South (3))

Wards from 6 May 1999 to 1 May 2008:

1. Brookmans Park & Little Heath (3)
2. Haldens (3)
3. Handside (3)
4. Hatfield Central (3)
5. Hatfield East (3)
6. Hatfield North (3)
7. Hatfield South (2)
8. Hatfield West (3)
9. Hollybush (3)
10. Howlands (3)
11. Northaw (3)
12. Panshanger (3)
13. Peartree (3)
14. Sherrards (3)
15. Welham Green (2)
16. Welwyn South (3)
17. Welwyn North (2)

Wards from 1 May 2008 to 5 May 2016:

1. Brookmans Park & Little Heath (3)
2. Haldens (3)
3. Handside (3)
4. Hatfield Central (3)
5. Hatfield East (3)
6. Hatfield South (2)
7. Hatfield Villages (3)
8. Hatfield West (3)
9. Hollybush (3)
10. Howlands (3)
11. Northaw & Cuffley (3)
12. Panshanger (3)
13. Peartree (3)
14. Sherrards (3)
15. Welham Green (2)
16. Welwyn East (3)
17. Welwyn West (2)

Wards from 5 May 2016 to present:

1. Brookmans Park & Little Heath (3)
2. Haldens (3)
3. Handside (3)
4. Hatfield Central (3)
5. Hatfield East (3)
6. Hatfield South West (3)
7. Hatfield Villages (3)
8. Hollybush (3)
9. Howlands (3)
10. Northaw & Cuffley (3)
11. Panshanger (3)
12. Peartree (3)
13. Sherrards (3)
14. Welham Green & Hatfield South (3)
15. Welwyn East (3)
16. Welwyn West (3)

== Electoral wards by constituency ==
Wards as they existed on 1 December 2020.

=== Broxbourne ===
Broxbourne: Broxbourne & Hoddesdon South; Cheshunt North; Cheshunt South & Theobalds; Flamstead End; Goffs Oak; Hoddesdon North; Hoddesdon Town & Rye Park; Rosedale & Bury Green; Waltham Cross; Wormley & Turnford.

East Hertfordshire: Great Amwell; Hertford Heath; Stanstead Abbots.

=== Harpenden and Berkhamsted ===
Dacorum: Aldbury & Wigginton; Ashridge; Berkhamsted Castle; Berkhamsted East; Berkhamsted West; Northchurch; Tring Central; Tring East; Tring West & Rural; Watling.

St Albans: Harpenden East; Harpenden North; Harpenden South; Harpenden West; Redbourn; Sandridge; Wheathampstead.

=== Hemel Hempstead ===
Dacorum: Adeyfield East; Adeyfield West; Apsley and Corner Hall; Bennetts End; Bovingdon, Flaunden & Chipperfield; Boxmoor; Chaulden & Warners End; Gadebridge; Grovehill; Hemel Hempstead Town; Highfield; Leverstock Green; Nash Mills; Woodhall Farm.

=== Hertford and Stortford ===
East Hertfordshire: Bishop’s Stortford All Saints; Bishop’s Stortford Central; Bishop’s Stortford Meads; Bishop’s Stortford Silverleys; Bishop’s Stortford South; Hertford Bengeo; Hertford Castle; Hertford Kingsmead; Hertford Sele; Hunsdon; Much Hadham; Sawbridgeworth; Ware Chadwell; Ware Christchurch; Ware St. Mary’s; Ware Trinity.

=== Hertsmere ===
Hertsmere: Aldenham East; Aldenham West; Bentley Heath & The Royds; Borehamwood Brookmeadow; Borehamwood Cowley Hill; Borehamwood Hillside; Borehamwood Kenilworth; Bushey Heath; Bushey Park; Bushey St. James; Elstree; Potters Bar Furzefield; Potters Bar Oakmere; Potters Bar Parkfield; Shenley.

Welwyn Hatfield: Northaw & Cuffley.

=== Hitchin (part) ===
North Hertfordshire: Cadwell; Chesfield; Hitchin Bearton; Hitchin Highbury; Hitchin Oughton; Hitchin Priory; Hitchin Walsworth; Hitchwood, Offa & Hoo; Kimpton.

=== North East Hertfordshire ===
East Hertfordshire: Braughing; Buntingford; Hertford Rural North; Hertford Rural South; Little Hadham; Mundens & Cottered; Puckeridge; Thundridge & Standon; Walkern; Watton-at-Stone.

North Hertfordshire: Arbury; Baldock East; Baldock Town; Ermine; Letchworth East; Letchworth Grange; Letchworth South East; Letchworth South West; Letchworth Wilbury; Royston Heath; Royston Meridian; Royston Palace; Weston & Sandon.

=== South West Hertfordshire ===
Dacorum: Kings Langley.

Three Rivers: Abbots Langley and Bedmond; Carpenders Park; Chorleywood North & Sarratt; Chorleywood South & Maple Cross; Dickinsons; Durrants; Gade Valley; Leavesden; Moor Park & Eastbury; Oxhey Hall & Hayling; Penn & Mill End; Rickmansworth Town; South Oxhey.

=== St Albans ===
St Albans: Ashley; Batchwood; Clarence; Colney Heath; Cunningham; London Colney; Marshalswick North; Marshalswick South; Park Street; St. Peters; St. Stephen; Sopwell; Verulam.

=== Stevenage ===
East Hertfordshire: Datchworth & Aston.

North Hertfordshire: Codicote; Knebworth.

Stevenage: Bandley Hill; Bedwell; Chells; Longmeadow; Manor; Martins Wood; Old Town; Pin Green; Roebuck; St Nicholas; Shephall; Symonds Green; Woodfield.

=== Watford ===
Hertsmere: Bushey North.

Watford: Callowland; Central; Holywell; Leggatts; Meriden; Nascot; Oxhey; Park; Stanborough; Tudor; Vicarage; Woodside.

=== Welwyn Hatfield ===
Welwyn Hatfield: Brookmans Park & Little Heath; Haldens; Handside; Hatfield Central; Hatfield East; Hatfield South West; Hatfield Villages; Hollybush; Howlands; Panshanger; Peartree; Sherrards; Welham Green & Hatfield South; Welwyn East; Welwyn West.

== See also ==
- List of parliamentary constituencies in Hertfordshire
