= Moor Park and Eastbury =

Electoral ward in the UK

Coordinates: 51.620°N 0.426°W

Boundary of Moor Park and Eastbury in Three Rivers

Moor Park and Eastbury is a ward in Three Rivers, near the town of Northwood in England. It is located in south-west Hertfordshire, in the East of England region. The ward includes the eponymous twin settlements of Moor Park and Eastbury, lying between Rickmansworth to the west, Croxley Green to the north, South Oxhey to the east, and Northwood to the south.

As one of the more populous wards in the district, with an electorate of 4,611, rising to 5,532 at the 2011 Census, the ward elects three members to Three Rivers District Council. It is represented by three Conservative councillors: Debbie Morris, Reena Ranger and Joanna Clemens. For elections to Hertfordshire County Council, part of Moor Park and Eastbury is in the Rickmansworth East and Oxhey Park division, represented by Reena Ranger, a Conservative; the remainder is in the South Oxhey and Eastbury division, represented by Christopher Alley, also a Conservative. For elections to the House of Commons, it is in the South West Hertfordshire constituency, represented by Gagan Mohindra, also of the Conservatives.

Along with Rickmansworth Town, Moor Park and Eastbury is in the Batchworth civil parish, and elects four councillors to Batchworth Community Council.

== Election results ==
=== Elections in the 2020s ===
2021 council election
Party	Candidate	Votes	%	±%
Conservative	Debbie Morris	1,317	72.2	▼3.7
Liberal Democrats	Jerry Asquith	227	12.4	▲1.7
Labour	Paul Gordon	142	7.8	▼1.2
Green	Deesha Chandra	138	7.6	N/A
Majority		1,090	59.8	▼5.4
Turnout		1,824	39.1	▲4.8
Conservative hold		Swing	▼2.7	

=== Elections in the 2010s ===
2019 council election
Party	Candidate	Votes	%	±%
Conservative	Reena Ranger	1,047	73.1	
Liberal Democrats	Jeremy Asquith	206	14.4	
Green	Paul Dawson	91	6.4	
Labour	Robert Crowley	89	6.2	
Majority		841	58.7	
Turnout		1,433	31.4	
Conservative hold		Swing		

2018 council election
Party	Candidate	Votes	%	±%
Conservative	Jo Clemens	1,123	77.1	
Liberal Democrats	Jeremy Asquith	192	13.2	
Labour	Sonia Adesara	141	9.7	
Majority		931	63.9	
Turnout		1456	31.1	
Conservative hold		Swing		
