= 2019 Three Rivers District Council election =

2019 UK local government election

Map showing the results of the 2019 Three Rivers District Council election

The 2019 Three Rivers District Council election took place on 2 May 2019 to elect members of Three Rivers District Council in England. This was the same day as other local elections.

== Results summary ==
Three Rivers District Council election, 2019
Party	Seats	Gains	Losses	Net gain/loss	Seats %	Votes %	Votes	+/−
Liberal Democrats	8	5	0	▲5	57.14	46.28	10,079	+8.89
Conservative	5	0	5	▼5	35.71	28.97	6,308	-11.16
Labour	1	0	0	Steady	7.14	12.34	2,687	-3.60
Green	0	0	0	Steady	0	9.48	2,064	+5.52
UKIP	0	0	0	Steady	0	2.05	446	-0.04
Independent	0	0	0	Steady	0	0.88	192	+0.39

== Results by Ward ==
=== Abbots Langley & Bedmond ===
Abbots Langley & Bedmond
Party	Candidate	Votes	%	±%
Liberal Democrats	David Major	1,136	70.43	+13.20
Green	Bobbie Curran	292	18.10	+14.60
Labour	Joanne Cox	185	11.47	−0.91
Majority		844		
Turnout			33.47	
Liberal Democrats hold		Swing		

=== Carpenders Park ===
Carpenders Park
Party	Candidate	Votes	%	±%
Conservative	Shanti Maru	692	42.95	−18.89
Conservative	Michael Revan	676	41.96	−19.88
Liberal Democrats	Pam Hames	537	33.33	+16.63
Liberal Democrats	Geoff Dunne	502	31.16	+14.46
Labour	Mandy Shumake	310	19.24	−2.22
Labour	William Waite	308	19.12	−2.34
Majority		139		
Turnout			30.10	
Conservative hold		Swing		
Conservative hold		Swing		

=== Chorleywood North and Sarratt ===
Chorleywood North and Sarratt
Party	Candidate	Votes	%	±%
Conservative	Alison Wall	1,198	63.79	−10.34
Liberal Democrats	Ben Trevett	447	23.80	+7.34
Green	Simon Hughes	169	9.00	N/A
Labour	Margaret Gallagher	64	3.41	−3.99
Majority		751		
Turnout			32.77	
Conservative hold		Swing		

=== Chorleywood South & Maple Cross ===
Chorleywood South & Maple Cross
Party	Candidate	Votes	%	±%
Liberal Democrats	Raj Khiroya	1,146	50.91	+0.69
Conservative	Angela Killick	832	36.96	+0.16
Green	Roger Stafford	205	9.11	+2.99
Labour	Anthony Cable	68	3.02	−3.84
Majority		314		
Turnout			39.09	
Liberal Democrats gain from Conservative		Swing		

=== Dickinsons ===
Dickinsons
Party	Candidate	Votes	%	±%
Liberal Democrats	Dominic Sokalski	1,268	66.18	+17.29
Conservative	Rupert Barnes	392	20.46	−13.82
Labour	Jeri Swift Gillett	137	7.15	−7.51
Green	Simon Fourmy	119	6.21	N/A
Majority		876		
Turnout			37.72	
Liberal Democrats gain from Conservative		Swing		

=== Durrants ===
Durrants
Party	Candidate	Votes	%	±%
Liberal Democrats	Stephanie Singer	1,089	64.36	+7.41
Conservative	Jane Goldman	291	17.20	−5.46
Labour	John Grillo	158	9.34	−3.06
Green	Nemone Caldwell	154	9.10	+3.48
Majority		798		
Turnout			34.60	
Liberal Democrats hold		Swing		

=== Gade Valley ===
Gade Valley
Party	Candidate	Votes	%	±%
Liberal Democrats	Alex Michaels	984	72.73	+18.26
Labour	Bruce Prochnik	201	14.86	−2.17
Green	Andrew Brading	168	12.42	+8.18
Majority		783		
Turnout			28.11	
Liberal Democrats gain from Conservative		Swing		

=== Leavesden ===
Leavesden
Party	Candidate	Votes	%	±%
Liberal Democrats	Kate Turner	1,115	76.11	+22.24
Labour	Marie-Louise Nolan	206	14.06	−1.92
Green	Charles Robinson	144	9.83	N/A
Majority		909		
Turnout			26.27	
Liberal Democrats hold		Swing		

=== Moor Park & Eastbury ===
Moor Park & Eastbury
Party	Candidate	Votes	%	±%
Conservative	Reena Ranger	1,047	73.06	−4.07
Liberal Democrats	Jeremy Asquith	206	14.38	+1.19
Green	Robert Crowley	91	6.35	N/A
Labour	Robert Crowley	89	6.21	−3.47
Majority		841		
Turnout			31.75	
Conservative hold		Swing		

=== Oxhey Hall & Hayling ===
Oxhey Hall & Hayling
Party	Candidate	Votes	%	±%
Liberal Democrats	Keith Martin	893	49.58	+5.26
Labour	Chris Green	372	20.66	−3.33
Conservative	Andy Milner	340	18.88	−6.77
UKIP	Mick Matthewson	196	10.88	+7.17
Majority		521		
Turnout			33.92	
Liberal Democrats gain from Conservative		Swing		

=== Penn & Mill End ===
Penn & Mill End
Party	Candidate	Votes	%	±%
Liberal Democrats	Tony Humphreys	733	46.48	−1.94
Conservative	Di Barber	436	27.65	−7.27
Independent	Vesper Hunter	159	10.08	N/A
Green	Emma Brading	135	8.56	+2.35
Labour	Martin Waldron	114	7.23	−3.22
Majority		297		
Turnout			30.14	
Liberal Democrats gain from Conservative		Swing		

=== Rickmansworth Town ===
Rickmansworth Town
Party	Candidate	Votes	%	±%
Conservative	David Raw	919	46.77	−11.03
Green	Peter Loader	533	27.12	+10.65
Liberal Democrats	Pat Howell	365	18.58	+4.69
Labour	Alex Charlton	148	7.53	−2.19
Majority		386		
Turnout			35.77	
Conservative hold		Swing		

=== South Oxhey ===
South Oxhey
Party	Candidate	Votes	%	±%
Labour	Stephen Cox	635	49.11	−13.44
UKIP	Lee Osborne	250	19.33	+8.93
Conservative	Pandora Melly	161	12.45	−8.27
Liberal Democrats	Mary Connolly	160	12.37	+7.75
Green	Mary Chabrel	54	4.18	+2.49
Independent	Yessica Gould	33	2.55	−7.85
Majority		385		
Turnout			25.46	
Labour hold		Swing		
