= 2026 Three Rivers District Council election =

2026 English local government election

- 7 May 2026

13 out of 39 seats to Three Rivers District Council 20 seats needed for a majority
- Registered: 69,113
- Turnout: 30,916 (44.7%)
	First party	Second party	Third party
Leader	Stephen Giles-Medhurst	Oliver Cooper	Chris Mitchell
Party	Liberal Democrats	Conservative	Green
Last election	21 seats, 42.3%	12 seats, 32.3%	3 seats, 12.1%
Seats before	19	11	3
Seats won	5	7	1
Seats after	18	14	3
Seat change	▼1	▲3	Steady
Popular vote	7,951	10,033	3,981
Percentage	25.7%	32.5%	12.9%
Swing	▼16.6%	▲0.2%	▲0.8%
	Fourth party	Fifth party
Leader	Steve Cox
Party	Labour	Independent
Last election	3 seats, 13.3%	Did not stand
Seats before	3	3
Seats won	0	0
Seats after	2	2
Seat change	▼1	▼1
Popular vote	1,563	1,563
Percentage	5.1%	2.1%
Swing	▼8.2%	N/A
- Map showing the results of the 2026 Three Rivers District Council election
Leader before election
Stephen Giles-Medhurst
Liberal Democrats
No overall control (Note: Liberal Democrats minority)
Leader after election
Stephen Giles-Medhurst
Liberal Democrats
No overall control (Note: Liberal Democrats minority)

The 2026 Three Rivers District Council election was held on 7 May 2026, alongside the other local elections across the United Kingdom being held on the same day. It elected 13 of 39 members of Three Rivers District Council in Hertfordshire, England.

Prior to the election, the council was under no overall control, run by a Liberal Democrat minority administration. The Conservatives won the majority of the seats contested at this election, but the Liberal Democrats remained the largest party on the council and continued to form a minority administration after the election.

Conservatives gained Abbots Langley and Bedmond (which they had won in two by-elections) from the Liberal Democrats, defeated the (Liberal Democrat) Deputy Leader of the council in Penn and Mill End, and defeated the (Labour) Chairman of the council in South Oxhey. They also regained Carpenders Park from an independent who had been elected as a Conservative but was backed by the Liberal Democrats.

== Summary ==
=== Background ===
In 2024, the Liberal Democrats retained control of the council.

However, the council was in no overall control after the Conservatives subsequently won two by-elections in the previously safe Liberal Democrat ward of Abbots Langley and Bedmond. As a result, the Liberal Democrats relied on support from Labour, Greens and former Conservative councillor Rue Grewal.

=== Council composition ===
After 2024 election		Before 2026 election	
Party	Seats	Party	Seats
Liberal Democrats	21	Liberal Democrats	19
Conservative	12	Conservative	11
Labour	3	Labour	3
Green	3	Green	3
Independent	0	Independent	3

Changes 2024–2026:

- May 2024:
  - David Raw (Conservative, Rickmansworth Town) resigns – by-election held July 2024
  - Ian Morris (Conservative, Carpenders Park) leaves party to sit as an independent
- July 2024:
  - Mike Sims (Conservative) wins by-election in Rickmansworth Town
  - Matthew Bedford (Liberal Democrats, Abbots Langley and Bedmond) resigns – by-election held August 2024
  - Sara Bedford (Liberal Democrats, Abbots Langley and Bedmond) leaves party to sit as an independent
- August 2024: Vicky Edwards (Conservative) gains by-election in Abbots Langley and Bedmond from Liberal Democrats
- January 2025: Sara Bedford (Independent, Abbots Langley and Bedmond) resigns – by-election held March 2025
- February 2025: Rue Grewal (Conservative, Carpenders Park) leaves party to sit as an independent
- March 2025:
  - Ian Campbell (Conservative) gains by-election in Abbots Langley and Bedmond from Liberal Democrats
  - Jonathon Solomons (Liberal Democrats, Durrants) resigns – by-election held May 2025
- May 2025: Paul Rainbow (Liberal Democrats) wins by-election in Durrants
- October 2025: Mike Sims (Conservative, Rickmansworth Town) leaves party to sit as independents

=== Election result ===
2026 Three Rivers District Council election
Party	This election				Full council			This election		
Party	Candidates	Seats	Net	Seats %	Other	Total	Total %	Votes	Votes %	+/−
Liberal Democrats	12	5	▼1	38.5	13	18	46.2	7,951	25.7	−16.6
Conservative	13	7	▲3	53.8	7	14	35.9	10,033	32.5	+0.2
Green	13	1	Steady	7.7	2	3	7.7	3,981	12.9	+0.8
Labour	13	0	▼1	0.0	2	2	5.1	1,563	5.1	−8.2
Independent	1	0	▼1	0.0	2	2	5.1	650	2.1	N/A
Reform	13	0	0	0.0	0	0	0.0	6,719	21.7	N/A
TUSC	1	0	Steady	0.0	0	0	0.0	19	0.1	N/A

== Incumbents ==
Ward	Incumbent Councillor	Party	Re-standing
Abbots Langley & Bedmond	Ian Campbell (Note: Elected at the 2025 Abbots Langley & Bedmond by-election.)	Conservative	Yes
Carpenders Park	Rue Grewal (Note: Originally elected as a Conservative, but subsequently left the party to sit as an independent.)	Independent	Yes
Chorleywood North & Sarratt	Philip Hearn	Conservative	Yes (Note: Standing in Chorleywood South & Maple Cross.)
Chorleywood South & Maple Cross	Louise Price (Note: Elected at the 2023 Chorleywood South & Maple Cross by-election.)	Liberal Democrats	Yes
Dickinsons	Chris Mitchell	Green	Yes
Durrants	Steve Drury	Liberal Democrats	Yes
Gade Valley	Khalid Hussain	Liberal Democrats	No
Leavesden	Kevin Raeburn	Liberal Democrats	Yes
Moor Park & Eastbury	Abbas Merali	Conservative	No
Oxhey Hall & Hayling	Anne Winter	Liberal Democrats	No
Penn & Mill End	Sarah Nelmes	Liberal Democrats	Yes
Rickmansworth Town	Andrea Fraser	Conservative	Yes
South Oxhey	Stephen King	Labour	Yes

== Ward results ==
=== Abbots Langley & Bedmond ===
Abbots Langley & Bedmond
Party	Candidate	Votes	%	±%
Conservative	Ian Campbell*	926	38.2	+18.1
Liberal Democrats	Jane Lay	753	31.1	–27.4
Reform	Kodi-Chantal Lloyd	436	18.0	N/A
Green	Jane Powell	226	9.3	+1.8
Labour	Pierce Culliton	80	3.3	–10.5
Majority		173	7.1	N/A
Turnout		2,421	49.7	+16.6
Registered electors		4,893		
Conservative hold		Swing	▲22.8	

=== Carpenders Park ===
Carpenders Park
Party	Candidate	Votes	%	±%
Conservative	Krutika Patel	970	38.3	–3.5
Independent	Rue Grewal*	650	25.6	N/A
Reform	Martin Thomas	572	22.6	N/A
Green	Matt Jones	187	7.4	+0.2
Labour	Don Wilkinson	156	6.2	–12.3
Majority		320	12.7	+3.3
Turnout		2,535	47.9	+13.2
Registered electors		5,308		
Conservative gain from Independent				

The Liberal Democrats declined to stand a candidate, instead endorsing Rue Grewal, the incumbent Independent councillor.

=== Chorleywood North & Sarratt ===
Chorleywood North & Sarratt
Party	Candidate	Votes	%	±%
Conservative	Matthew Hunt	1,203	47.2	–11.6
Reform	Caroline Ansell	576	22.6	N/A
Liberal Democrats	Mohinder Kalsi	481	18.9	–10.3
Green	Peter Loader	199	7.8	+2.3
Labour	Margaret Gallagher	92	3.6	–2.6
Majority		627	24.6	–5.0
Turnout		2,551	44.9	+10.1
Registered electors		5,689		
Conservative hold				

=== Chorleywood South & Maple Cross ===
Chorleywood South & Maple Cross
Party	Candidate	Votes	%	±%
Liberal Democrats	Louise Price*	1,000	37.1	–18.1
Conservative	Philip Hearn* (Note: Incumbent councillor in Chorleywood North and Sarratt, but standing for election in Chorleywood South and Maple Cross instead of for re-election in Chorleywood North and Sarratt.)	857	31.8	+3.4
Reform	Natalie Johnson	511	19.0	N/A
Green	Roger Stafford	258	9.6	+1.0
Labour	John Monk	67	2.5	–5.3
Majority		143	5.3	–21.5
Turnout		2,693	46.7	+13.6
Registered electors		5,777		
Liberal Democrats hold		Swing	▼10.8	

=== Dickinsons ===
Dickinsons
Party	Candidate	Votes	%	±%
Green	Chris Mitchell*	1,234	50.8	+1.2
Liberal Democrats	Atif Wasay	455	18.7	–19.4
Reform	Alison Wall	445	18.3	N/A
Conservative	Rupert Barnes	235	9.7	+2.0
Labour	Jeni Swift-Gillett	59	2.4	–2.2
Majority		779	32.1	+20.6
Turnout		2,428	47.1	+5.0
Registered electors		5,177		
Green hold		Swing	▲10.3	

=== Durrants ===
Durrants
Party	Candidate	Votes	%	±%
Liberal Democrats	Steve Drury*	1,242	52.4	–12.6
Green	Andy Delius	441	18.6	–2.5
Reform	Dominic Evans	417	17.6	N/A
Conservative	Neil Marathe	219	9.2	+0.6
Labour	John Grillo	50	2.1	–3.2
Majority		801	33.9	–10.0
Turnout		2,369	47.7	+6.9
Registered electors		4,973		
Liberal Democrats hold		Swing	▼5.1	

=== Gade Valley ===
Gade Valley
Party	Candidate	Votes	%	±%
Liberal Democrats	Aidan Bentley	716	32.8	–17.4
Conservative	Jo Colledge-Miller	697	31.9	+5.4
Reform	Sachin Dhir	508	23.3	N/A
Green	Andrew Gallagher	162	7.4	+1.1
Labour	Bruce Prochnik	100	4.6	–12.4
Majority		19	0.9	–22.8
Turnout		2,183	42.8	+16.2
Registered electors		5,110		
Liberal Democrats hold		Swing	▼11.4	

=== Leavesden ===
Leavesden
Party	Candidate	Votes	%	±%
Liberal Democrats	Kevin Raeburn*	888	40.5	–14.7
Reform	Nicky Rowe	538	24.6	N/A
Conservative	Anne Jervis	438	20.0	–4.2
Green	Michael Rayment	193	8.8	+3.1
Labour	Colin Gray	114	5.2	–9.6
TUSC	Richard Shattock	19	0.9	N/A
Majority		350	15.9	–15.1
Turnout		2,190	37.5	+8.4
Registered electors		5,850		
Liberal Democrats hold				

=== Moor Park & Eastbury ===
Moor Park & Eastbury
Party	Candidate	Votes	%	±%
Conservative	Anaika Chopra	1,025	58.0	–14.0
Reform	Shailja Shah	262	14.8	N/A
Liberal Democrats	Peter Harman	224	12.7	–0.3
Green	Jan Blatchford-Pace	193	10.9	+2.9
Labour	Mashkoor Khan	63	3.6	–3.3
Majority		763	45.3	–13.7
Turnout		1,767	39.8	+6.5
Registered electors		4,444		
Conservative hold				

=== Oxhey Hall & Hayling ===
Oxhey Hall & Hayling
Party	Candidate	Votes	%	±%
Liberal Democrats	Shelley Gormley	866	36.8	–19.5
Reform	Alex Trainor	746	31.7	N/A
Conservative	Vishal Patel	396	16.8	–4.9
Green	Noah Yeates	201	8.5	+3.3
Labour	Jason St John	146	6.2	–10.6
Majority		120	5.1	–29.5
Turnout		2,355	43.5	+9.1
Registered electors		5,420		
Liberal Democrats hold				

=== Penn & Mill End ===
Penn & Mill End
Party	Candidate	Votes	%	±%
Conservative	Kerry Milliken	892	37.5	+1.7
Reform	Dane Clarke	623	26.2	N/A
Liberal Democrats	Sarah Nelmes*	574	24.1	–18.3
Green	Malcolm Lee	204	8.6	–1.2
Labour	Joanne Cox	86	3.6	–8.5
Majority		269	11.3	N/A
Turnout		2,379	46.6	+17.7
Registered electors		5,129		
Conservative gain from Liberal Democrats				

=== Rickmansworth Town ===
Rickmansworth Town
Party	Candidate	Votes	%	±%
Conservative	Andrea Fraser*	1,380	49.5	+5.8
Liberal Democrats	Katy Sorkin	667	23.9	–17.8
Reform	Melvyn Clifford	373	13.4	N/A
Green	Kelly Critcher	282	10.1	+3.4
Labour	Philip Lockett	85	3.0	–4.9
Majority		713	25.6	+23.6
Turnout		2,787	49.4	+5.9
Registered electors		5,650		
Conservative hold		Swing	▲11.8	

=== South Oxhey ===
South Oxhey
Party	Candidate	Votes	%	±%
Conservative	Kavan Trivedi	795	35.2	–0.9
Reform	Taylor Smith	712	31.5	N/A
Labour	Stephen King*	465	20.6	–29.5
Green	Chris Lawrence	201	8.9	+1.8
Liberal Democrats	Rhys Southall	85	3.8	–2.8
Majority		83	3.7	N/A
Turnout		2,258	39.8	+10.9
Registered electors		5,693		
Conservative gain from Labour				
