= Pear Tree =

The pear is any of several tree and shrub species of genus Pyrus.

Pear Tree or Peartree may refer to:

== England ==
- Pear Tree, Derby, a suburb of Derby, Derbyshire
- Peartree railway station, in Derby
- Peartree, an electoral ward in Hertfordshire
- Peartree Primary School, a school in Hertfordshire
- Pear Tree House, an apartment building in London
- Peartree Green, an open space in Southampton
- Peartree House, a historic building in Southampton
- Peartree (ward), an electoral ward in Southampton

== Other uses ==
- The Pear Tree, a 1998 Iranian film
- Pear Tree (Klimt), a 1903 painting by Gustav Klimt
- Pear Tree Point School, a private elementary school in Darien, Connecticut
- Peartree productions, the fictional media organisation headed by television presenter Alan Partridge
