= 2014 Three Rivers District Council election =

2014 UK local government election

2014 local election results in Three Rivers

The 2014 Three Rivers District Council election took place on 22 May 2014 to elect members of Three Rivers District Council in England. This was on the same day as other local elections.

== Ward Results ==
=== Abbots Langley & Bedmond ===
Abbots Langley & Bedmond
Party	Candidate	Votes	%	±%
Liberal Democrats	Sara Bedford	1,048	64.8	
Liberal Democrats	Matthew Bedford	989	61.1	
Liberal Democrats	David Major	862	53.3	
Conservative	Taylor Bryant	446	27.6	
UKIP	Lee Farrell	439	27.1	
Conservative	Margaret Lambert	408	25.2	
Conservative	Andrew O'Brien	406	25.1	
Labour	Ahmad-Said Namdarkhan	227	14.0	
Labour	Mandy Shumake	224	13.8	
Labour	Adam Cadoo	187	11.6	
Majority				
Turnout		1,618	33.2	
Liberal Democrats win (new seat)				
Liberal Democrats win (new seat)				
Liberal Democrats win (new seat)				

=== Carpenders Park ===
Carpenders Park
Party	Candidate	Votes	%	±%
Conservative	Eric Bishop	1,065	58.1	
Conservative	Terry dos Ramos	962	52.5	
Conservative	Angela Roberts	944	51.5	
Liberal Democrats	Pam Hames	846	46.2	
Liberal Democrats	Mary Connolly	749	40.9	
Liberal Democrats	Thomas Kingston	621	33.9	
Labour	Pamela King	365	19.9	
Labour	Paul Gordon	357	19.5	
Labour	Don Wilkinson	311	17.0	
Majority				
Turnout		1,809	34.7	
Conservative win (new seat)				
Conservative win (new seat)				
Conservative win (new seat)				

=== Chorleywood North and Sarratt ===
Chorleywood North and Sarratt
Party	Candidate	Votes	%	±%
Conservative	Alex Hayward	1,422	71.6	
Conservative	Marilyn Butler	1,367	68.9	
Conservative	Heather Kenison	1,295	65.2	
UKIP	Vesper Hunter	407	20.5	
Liberal Democrats	Barbara Green	398	20.1	
Liberal Democrats	Tony Edwards	348	17.5	
Liberal Democrats	Lyn Sutherland	292	14.7	
Labour	Michael King	131	6.6	
Labour	Greg Shumake	124	6.2	
Labour	Barbara Woolner	112	5.6	
Majority				
Turnout		1,985	34.8	
Conservative win (new seat)				
Conservative win (new seat)				
Conservative win (new seat)				

=== Chorleywood South and Maple Cross ===
Chorleywood South and Maple Cross
Party	Candidate	Votes	%	±%
Liberal Democrats	Martin Trevett	1,216	63.7	
Liberal Democrats	Ann Shaw	1,196	62.7	
Liberal Democrats	Sue Stibbs	1,106	57.9	
Conservative	Angela Killick	830	43.5	
Conservative	Geoffrey Liley	729	38.2	
Conservative	Jackie Worrall	727	38.1	
UKIP	Richard Booth	431	22.6	
Labour	Fiona Goble	226	11.8	
Labour	David Williams	203	10.6	
Labour	William Waite	139	7.3	
Majority				
Turnout		1,909	33.1	
Liberal Democrats win (new seat)				
Liberal Democrats win (new seat)				
Liberal Democrats win (new seat)				

=== Dickinsons ===
Dickinsons
Party	Candidate	Votes	%	±%
Liberal Democrats	Philip Brading	1,018	48.1	
Liberal Democrats	Peter Getkahn	866	40.9	
Liberal Democrats	Wendy Jordan	858	40.5	
Conservative	Rupert Barnes	672	31.7	
Conservative	Wendy Benatar	529	25.0	
Conservative	Jussie Kaur	529	25.0	
Labour	Margaret Gallagher	378	17.8	
Labour	David Wynne-Jones	353	16.7	
Labour	Ian Holmes	278	13.1	
Majority				
Turnout		2,118	42.2	
Liberal Democrats win (new seat)				
Liberal Democrats win (new seat)				
Liberal Democrats win (new seat)				

=== Durrants ===
Durrants
Party	Candidate	Votes	%	±%
Liberal Democrats	Steve Drury	1,104	54.8	
Liberal Democrats	Christopher Lloyd	1,023	50.8	
Liberal Democrats	Alison Wall	875	43.5	
UKIP	Frank Brand	562	27.9	
Conservative	Michelle Bass	492	24.4	
Conservative	Christine Jefford	451	22.4	
Labour	Sarah Linhart	207	10.3	
Labour	Showky Akhbari	199	9.9	
Labour	Brendan O'Brien	169	8.4	
Majority				
Turnout		2,013	40.9	
Liberal Democrats win (new seat)				
Liberal Democrats win (new seat)				
Liberal Democrats win (new seat)				

=== Gade Valley ===
Gade Valley
Party	Candidate	Votes	%	±%
Liberal Democrats	Chris Whately-Smith	779	58.1	
Liberal Democrats	Joy Mann	773	57.6	
Liberal Democrats	Keith Williams	688	51.3	
Conservative	Robert Harper	425	31.7	
Conservative	Leslie Proctor	386	28.8	
Conservative	Martin Thomas	354	26.4	
Labour	Philip Lockett	322	24.0	
Labour	Bruce Prochnik	298	22.2	
Labour	Maureen Sedlacek	292	21.8	
Majority				
Turnout		1,341	26.6	
Liberal Democrats win (new seat)				
Liberal Democrats win (new seat)				
Liberal Democrats win (new seat)				

=== Leavesden ===
Leavesden
Party	Candidate	Votes	%	±%
Liberal Democrats	Martin Brooks	838	49.3	
Liberal Democrats	Stephen Giles-Medhurst	828	48.7	
Liberal Democrats	Kate Turner	771	45.4	
UKIP	David Bennett	389	22.9	
Conservative	Susan Clark	354	20.8	
Conservative	Hitesh Tailor	230	13.5	
Conservative	Larry Rach	229	13.5	
Labour	Joanne Cox	216	12.7	
Labour	Colin Gray	199	11.7	
Labour	John Sedlacek	150	8.8	
TUSC	Richard Shattock	58	3.4	
Majority				
Turnout		1,700	29.1	
Liberal Democrats win (new seat)				
Liberal Democrats win (new seat)				
Liberal Democrats win (new seat)				

=== Moor Park and Eastbury ===
Moor Park and Eastbury
Party	Candidate	Votes	%	±%
Conservative	Kemal Butt	1,258	84.3	
Conservative	Debbie Morris	1,200	80.4	
Conservative	Reena Ranger	1,166	78.2	
UKIP	Yessica Gould	239	16.0	
Liberal Democrats	Jeremy Asquith	208	13.9	
Liberal Democrats	Gabriel Aitman	168	11.3	
Labour	Jayshree Radia	167	11.2	
Labour	David Hadley	155	10.4	
Liberal Democrats	Abdul Vayani	137	9.2	
Labour	Mannargudi Ram	126	8.4	
Majority				
Turnout		1,492	33.3	
Conservative win (new seat)				
Conservative win (new seat)				
Conservative win (new seat)				

=== Oxhey Hall & Hayling ===
Oxhey Hall & Hayling
Party	Candidate	Votes	%	±%
Liberal Democrats	Alison Scarth	612	33.2	
Liberal Democrats	Andrew Scarth	561	30.4	
Conservative	Ty Harris	550	29.8	
Conservative	John Kyles	517	28.0	
Conservative	Irene Able	512	27.8	
Liberal Democrats	Phil Redshaw	511	27.7	
Labour	Joan King	503	27.3	
UKIP	Diane Day	490	26.7	
Labour	Stephen King	477	25.9	
UKIP	Michael Matthewson	465	25.2	
Labour	James McEwan	429	23.3	
Majority				
Turnout		1,844	34.4	
Liberal Democrats win (new seat)				
Liberal Democrats win (new seat)				
Conservative win (new seat)				

=== Penn and Mill End ===
Penn and Mill End
Party	Candidate	Votes	%	±%
Liberal Democrats	Sarah Nelmes	673	44.7	
Liberal Democrats	Roger Seabourne	609	40.5	
Liberal Democrats	Raj Khiroya	595	39.5	
Conservative	Diana Barber	532	35.3	
Conservative	David Raw	516	34.3	
UKIP	Cathy Stacey	468	31.1	
UKIP	Richard Stacey	442	29.4	
Conservative	Nigel Stewart	377	25.0	
Labour	Hayley Johnson	253	16.8	
Labour	Nick Jordan	221	14.7	
Labour	Matt Doughty	207	13.8	
Majority				
Turnout		1,505	29.0	
Liberal Democrats win (new seat)				
Liberal Democrats win (new seat)				
Liberal Democrats win (new seat)				

=== Rickmansworth Town ===
Rickmansworth Town
Party	Candidate	Votes	%	±%
Conservative	Paula Hiscocks	1,290	53.1	
Conservative	David Sansom	1,178	48.5	
Conservative	Ralph Sangster	1,167	48.0	
Liberal Democrats	Pat Howell	597	24.6	
Liberal Democrats	Jill Swainson	523	21.5	
Liberal Democrats	Tony Humphreys	494	20.3	
Labour	Graham Dale	342	14.1	
Labour	Felix Gill	329	13.5	
Labour	Bob Mountain	321	13.2	
Majority				
Turnout		2,430	43.6	
Conservative win (new seat)				
Conservative win (new seat)				
Conservative win (new seat)				

=== South Oxhey ===
South Oxhey
Party	Candidate	Votes	%	±%
Labour	Len Tippen	722	45.6	
Labour	Marie-Louise Nolan	717	45.3	
Labour	Stephen Cox	709	44.8	
Conservative	David Benatar	379	24.0	
Conservative	Graham Denman	370	23.4	
Conservative	Mary Sangster	358	22.6	
Liberal Democrats	Paul Salter	183	11.6	
Liberal Democrats	Geoff Dunne	175	11.1	
Liberal Democrats	Richard Joseph	151	9.5	
Majority				
Turnout		1,582	28.9	
Labour win (new seat)				
Labour win (new seat)				
Labour win (new seat)				
