= Batchworth Heath =

Nature reserve in Hertfordshire, England

Coordinates: 51.6345°N 0.4438°W

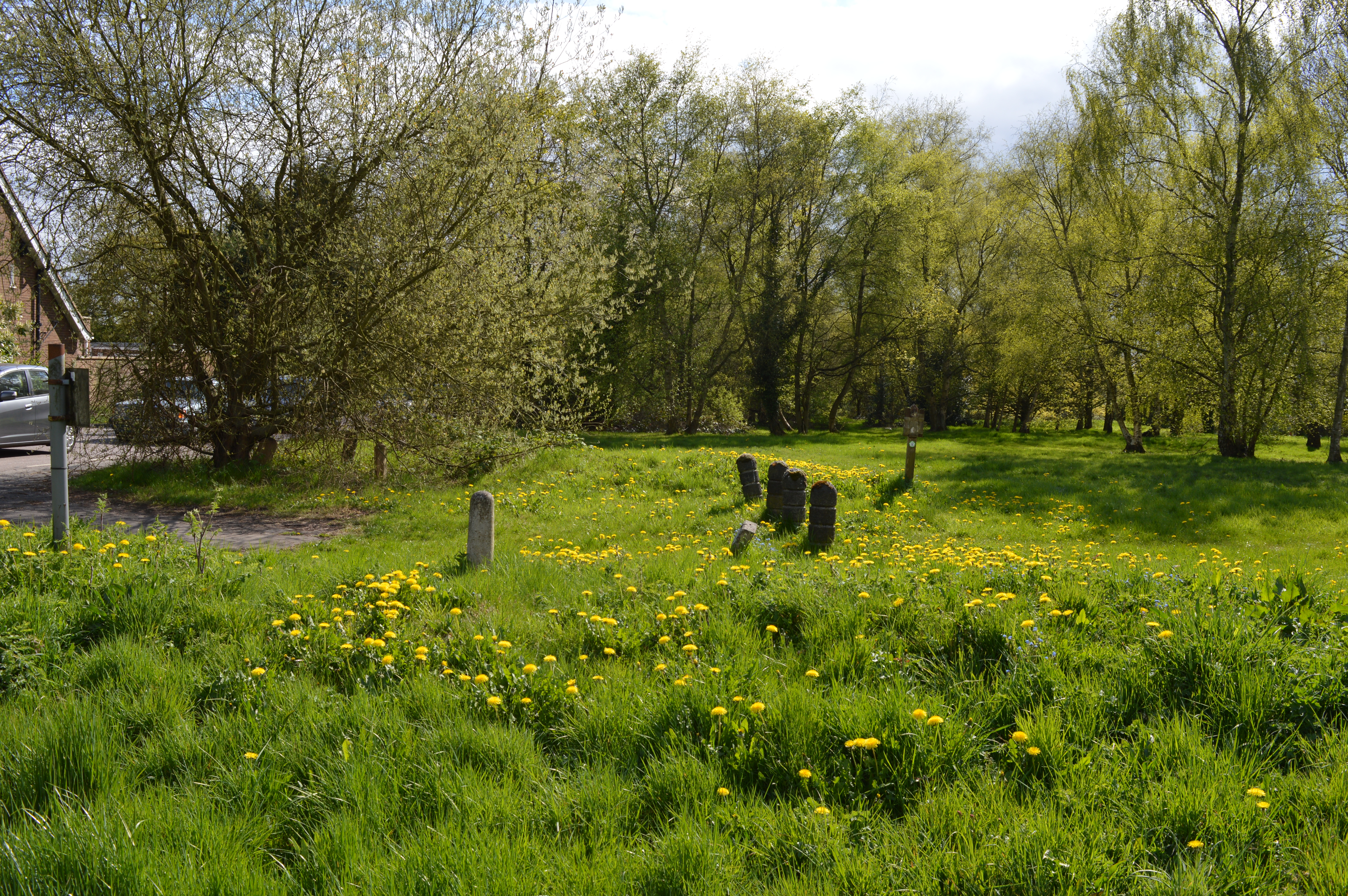

Batchworth Heath is 4 hectares (10 acres) of designated common land in Rickmansworth, Hertfordshire, around the junction of Batchworth Heath Hill, Batchworth Lane and White Hill, owned and managed by Three Rivers District Council. The habitat is heathland with an ancient pond and rich wildlife. Since July 2015 the site has been listed by Natural England as a Local Nature Reserve, but according to Three Rivers Council this is an error and they have asked Natural England to remove it from the list.
