= West Hyde =

Coordinates: 51.6103°N 0.5118°W

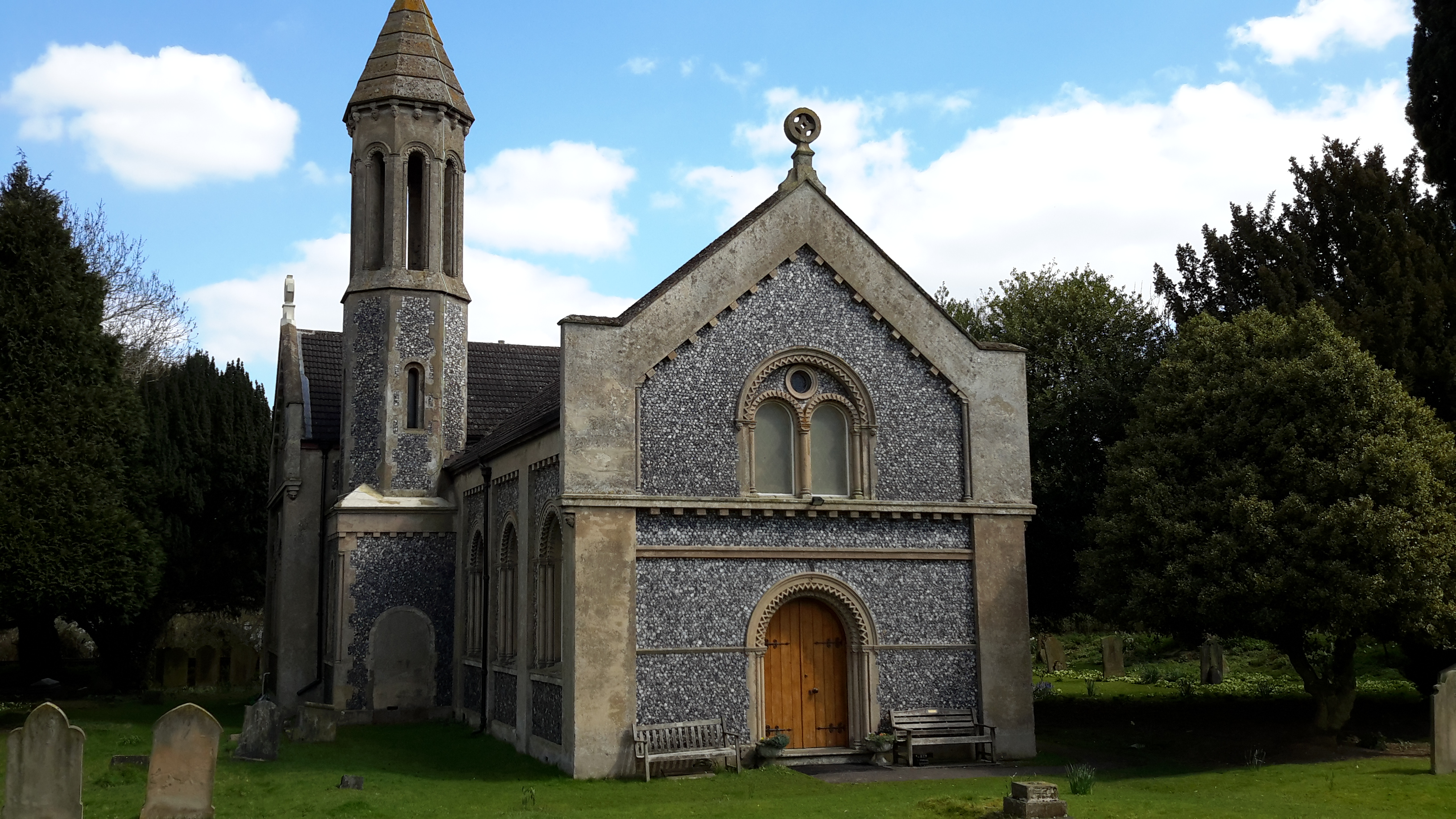
- St Thomas Church

- Location within Hertfordshire
- District: Three Rivers
- Shire county: Hertfordshire
- Region: East
- Country: England
- Sovereign state: United Kingdom
- Post town: RICKMANSWORTH
- Postcode district: WD3 9
- Dialling code: 01895
- Police: Hertfordshire
- Fire: Hertfordshire
- Ambulance: East of England
- UK Parliament: South West Hertfordshire

West Hyde is a village situated alongside the A412 road, in the Three Rivers District in south-west Hertfordshire, England. At the 2011 the population of the village was included in the Three Rivers ward of Maple Cross and Mill End.

== Notable buildings ==
- Jolly Gardeners - Believed to have been built in 1820, Ye Jolly Gardeners was the local public house for the village of West Hyde until 1956 and then converted into a house.
- The Oaks - Originally named The Royal Oak, and then The Fisherman's Tackle (from 1990), The Oaks (from 2013) is the village's current public house.
- St Thomas - The church of St Thomas of Canterbury was built in 1845. It was built in the Norman style and designed by Thomas Smith, Architect of Hertford; a copy of his earlier Holy Trinity Church at Wareside, completed in 1841. Pulhamite artificial stonework mouldings were used throughout. The building was faced with extremely high quality knapped flintwork, at a cost of £2,200.
Stonework and knapped flintwork on St. Thomas

Wall flints
