= Maple Cross and Mill End =

Coordinates: 51.634°N 0.492°W

Maple Cross and Mill End is a ward in Three Rivers, in England, the United Kingdom. It is located in the far south-west Hertfordshire, in the East of England region. The ward includes the eponymous villages of Maple Cross and Mill End, lying between Chorleywood West to the north; Penn, Rickmansworth, and Harefield to the east; and Chalfont St. Giles and Chalfont Common to the west.

As one of the more populous wards in the district, with an electorate of 3,931, including West Hyde, and increasing to 5,602 at the 2011 Census, the ward elects three members to the Three Rivers District Council. For elections to Hertfordshire County Council, Maple Cross and Mill End is part of the Rickmansworth constituency, represented by the Conservative Barbara Lamb. For elections to the House of Commons, it is in the South West Hertfordshire constituency, represented by David Gauke, also of the Conservatives.
