= Primary schools in Three Rivers District =

Schools in Hertfordshire, England

This page provides brief details of primary schools in the borough of Three Rivers in Hertfordshire, England, United Kingdom.

All the state-funded primary schools in Three Rivers are co-educational. There are four Roman Catholic schools and five Church of England schools in the area, all of which are voluntary aided schools except for Sarratt Church of England School, which is voluntary controlled. The remaining schools are all non-faith community schools. The Local Education Authority is Hertfordshire County Council.

There are still some linked pairs of infant schools and junior schools, with the infant school covering Reception and Key Stage 1 (Years 1 and 2) and the junior school covering Key Stage 2 (Years 3 to 6). However most have been amalgamated in a single Junior Mixed Infant (JMI) school or (equivalently) primary school.

== West: Rickmansworth, Chorleywood and environs ==
Name	Faith	Type	Opened	Intake	DCSF number	Ofsted	Web	Coordinates
Arnett Hills	–	JMI	1968	30	2348	117289	W	51.6453°N 0.4944°W
Chorleywood	–	Primary	1914	30	2019	117093	W	51.6467°N 0.5232°W
Christ Church	CE	Primary	1853	30	5201	117561	W	51.6579°N 0.5020°W
Maple Cross	–	JMI	1964	30	2308	117266	W	51.6187°N 0.5132°W
Rickmansworth Park	–	JMI		30	2379	117304	W	51.6434°N 0.4660°W
The Russell	–	Primary	1953	30	2025	117098	W	51.6551°N 0.5275°W
Sarratt	CE	Primary	1862	25	3037	117404	W	51.6822°N 0.4919°W
Shepherd	–	Primary		30	2022	117096	W	51.6367°N 0.4959°W
St John's	RC	Primary	1965	30	3398	117475	W	51.6372°N 0.4915°W
St Mary's	CE	Primary	1711?	30	3359	117447	W	51.6300°N 0.4743°W
St Peter's	CE	Primary	1862	30	3360	117448	W	51.6367°N 0.4907°W

Rickmansworth Charity School was established in 1711. The charity grew with a number of bequests, and the school was rebuilt on a new site in 1814. In 1836 the Rickmansworth Poor House on the High Street (adjacent to the current Baptist church) closed, and the site was taken over by the school, now operating as a national school. The school was extended in 1851, and closed in 1936.

Mill End National School was established in 1862, initially for girls and infants but soon also taking boys. In 1874 the school moved to new buildings, and in 1936 became a county-funded JMI school, now known as St Peter's CofE VA Primary School.

West Hyde National School was established in 1862, enlarged in 1874 and 1901, and replaced by a county school across the road in 1914.

Chorleywood National School (now Christ Church Church of England School) was established in 1853, 8 years after Chorleywood became a separate parish. It was joined in 1911 by Stag Lane Primary School, which was rebuilt in the 1960s as Chorleywood Primary School.

== Central: Croxley Green ==
Name	Faith	Type	Opened	Intake	DCSF number	Ofsted	Web	Coordinates
Harvey Road	–	Primary	1938	30	2082	117131	W	51.6450°N 0.4499°W
Little Green	–	Junior	1949	90	2083	117132	W	51.6576°N 0.4456°W
Malvern Way	–	Infants	1949	90	2084	117133	W	51.6506°N 0.4400°W
Yorke Mead	–	Primary	1974	30	2079	117130	W	51.6506°N 0.4507°W

The original village school in Yorke Road was established in 1875. After the building was partially destroyed by fire, Harvey Road School was hastily built to accommodate some of the students. The village school was finally replaced by Yorke Meade School. Malvern Way School is linked with Little Green.

== North-east: Abbots Langley and Garston ==
This area now comprises the northern suburbs of Watford.

Name	Faith	Type	Opened	Intake	DCSF number	Ofsted	Web	Coordinates
Abbots Langley	–	Primary	1831	60	2000	117083	W	51.7101°N 0.4163°W
Bedmond Village	–	Primary	1968	30	2270	117248	W	51.7192°N 0.4130°W
Divine Saviour	RC	Primary	1966	30	3410	117485	W	51.7004°N 0.4282°W
St Catherine of Siena	RC	Primary	1964	30	5211	117571	W	51.6962°N 0.3857°W
St Paul's	CE	Primary	1858	30	3301	117417	W	51.6918°N 0.4388°W
Tanners Wood	–	JMI	1952	45	2147	117178	W	51.6993°N 0.4230°W

Abbots Langley Primary School was founded as a national school, first for boys, with departments for girls and infants built in the 1840s. In 1853 the boys' school was rebuilt on land left by local landowner Francis Combe, a benefactor of several schools in the area. The boys and girls schools were amalgamated in 1923, and the schools and lands sold to Hertfordshire County Council in 1949. The school was rebuilt on the girls' site in 1958; the boys' site is now occupied by the public library.

St Paul's C of E Primary School also started as a national school, set up by William Jones Loyd of Langleybury. The original school house still stands across the A41 road from the church, and is Grade II listed. The school was moved to the present site in 1967 following the widening of the A41 in the previous year.

Tanners Wood JMI School was opened in 1989 as a relaunch of Hillside JMI School, which was formed in 1982 from the merger or Hillside Junior School and Hazelwood Infants School on the site of the former junior school. The former Hazelwood site is now occupied by Breakspeare School.

== South-east: Northwood, South Oxhey and Carpenders Park ==
This area lies between Watford and the northern edge of Greater London.

Name	Faith	Type	Opened	Intake	DCSF number	Ofsted	Web	Coordinates
Eastbury Farm	–	JMI	1962	30	2266	117245	W	51.6240°N 0.4186°W
Greenfields	–	Primary	1952	30	2177	117193	W	51.6179°N 0.3937°W
Oxhey Wood	–	Primary		51	2137	117170	W	51.6249°N 0.3915°W
St Joseph's	RC	Primary	1955	30	3383	117465	W	51.6272°N 0.3969°W
St Meryl	–	Primary		30	2131	117166	W	51.6285°N 0.3776°W
Warren Dell	–	Primary	1949	30	2135	117169	W	51.6285°N 0.3911°W
Woodhall	–	Primary		30	2178	117194	W	51.6207°N 0.3838°W

Eastbury Farm Junior Mixed Infant and Nursery School was judged outstanding in all areas by Ofsted in 2007, a result achieved by only 1% of primary schools in England. Eastbury Farm's Key Stage 2 pupils achieve significantly higher grades in English, Mathematics and Science than the national average.

Greenfields Primary School was the first of a new generation of school buildings in Hertfordshire, and is Grade II listed.

== See also ==
The secondary schools in Three Rivers:

- Parmiter's School
- Rickmansworth School
- St. Clement Danes School
- St Joan of Arc Catholic School, Rickmansworth
- St. Michael's Catholic High School

The special school in Three Rivers:

- Breakspeare School
