= Reena Ranger =

British Conservative politician

Councillor The Honourable Reena Ranger OBE
- Born: 1978 (age 47–48); London, England
- Occupations: Community leader, businesswoman
- Years active: 2006–present
- Political party: Conservative
- Board member of: Women Empowered Network
- Spouse: Harmeet "Sunny" Singh Ahuja
- Father: Rami Ranger

Reena Ranger OBE (born 1978) is a British community leader and businesswoman. She has served as a Conservative Party councillor on Three Rivers District Council since 2014.

== Career ==
Ranger has been working since her twenties in the family firm set up by her father Rami Ranger, who was created a life peer in 2019.

Founder and chairperson of Women Empowered, a social enterprise empowering women through panel discussions and networking, her guests have included Vivek Oberoi and Gurinder Chadha.

Ranger attended the Transatlantic International Leaders Network in 2017, where she spoke about the importance of networks for 'women of colour' which led to the development of an 'EU women's group'.

She is an active member of the Conservative Party, and has spoken at the party conference on 'fighting injustices'. She was selected as the Conservative party candidate for Birmingham Hall Green, a safe seat for the Labour Party, at the 2017 general election, but was unsuccessful, coming a distant second. Ranger has been a Three Rivers District Councillor representing Moor Park and Eastbury since 2014.

== Honours ==
In the 2019 Birthday Honours, Ranger was appointed an Officer of the Order of the British Empire (OBE) for services to BAME women.

== Views ==
Ranger believes in the power of networking and supports stem cell donation.

== Personal life ==
Ranger is married to Harmeet "Sunny" Singh Ahuja.

== See also ==
- List of British Indians
- List of British Sikhs
