= Batchworth =

Civil parish in Hertfordshire, England

Coordinates: 51.63°N 00.46°W

- Location within Hertfordshire
- OS grid reference: TQ0694
- Civil parish: Batchworth
- District: Three Rivers
- Shire county: Hertfordshire
- Region: East
- Country: England
- Sovereign state: United Kingdom
- Post town: RICKMANSWORTH
- Postcode district: WD3
- Dialling code: 01923
- Police: Hertfordshire
- Fire: Hertfordshire
- Ambulance: East of England

Batchworth was once a hamlet and is now a civil parish and part of Rickmansworth in Hertfordshire. The parish of Batchworth was created on 1 April 2017 consisting of two Three Rivers District Council wards: Rickmansworth Town, and Moor Park and Eastbury. The first election to Batchworth Parish Council was on 4 May 2017. There are eight councillors; four in each ward.

The Grand Union Canal passes through Batchworth. The Batchworth Canal Centre is alongside the Grand Union lock, near the junction of the A404 and A4145 roads. This is the home of the Rickmansworth Waterways Trust who run a visitors centre, a working heritage boat, a small outdoor cafe and co-ordination of the annual Rickmansworth Canal Festival.

The future of the historic cotton mill is uncertain following its need of urgent repairs.

Batchworth Sea Scouts have their headquarters alongside the canal. The Batchworth Dragons dragon boat club were born out of the scout group and competes at a national and international level.

Batchworth Lake, created by the extraction of gravel for the original Wembley Stadium, is used for water skiing and forms part of Rickmansworth Aquadrome.

Batchworth Heath is four hectares (ten acres) of designated common land around the junction of Batchworth Heath Hill, Batchworth Lane and White Hill, owned and managed by Three Rivers District Council. The habitat is heathland with an ancient pond and rich wildlife. Since July 2015 the site has been listed by Natural England as a Local Nature Reserve, but according to Three Rivers Council this is an error and they have asked Natural England to remove it from the list.

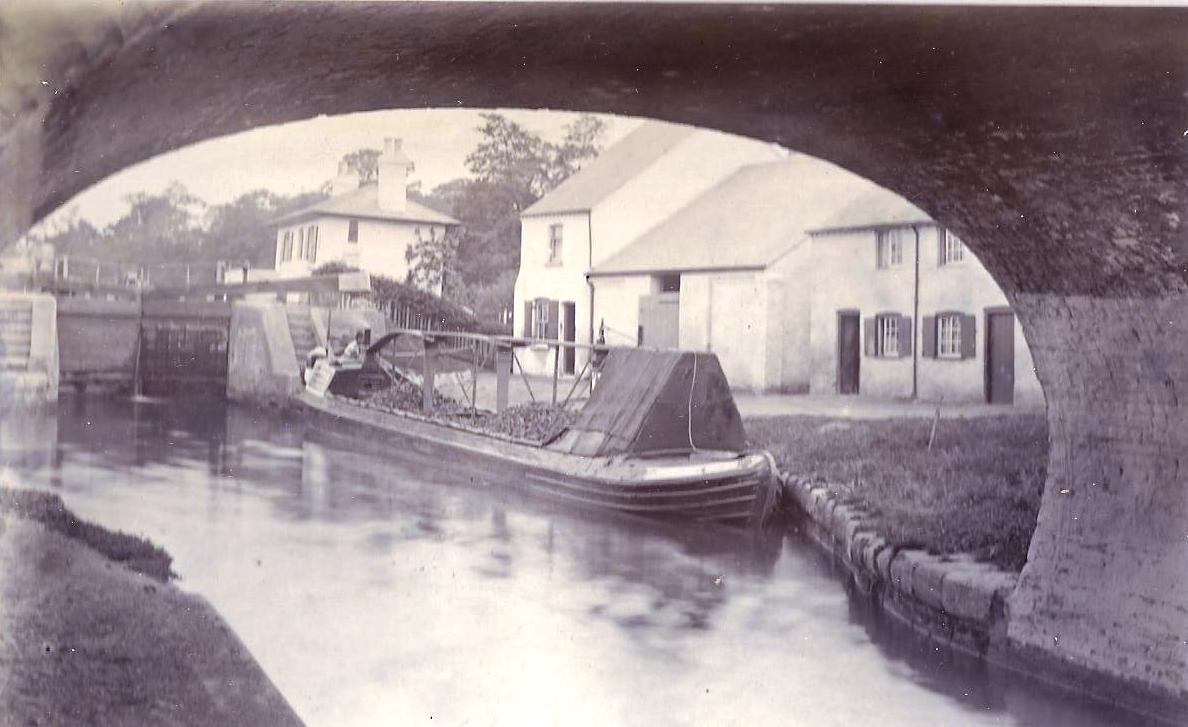
Batchworth Lock No 81
Under the A404 bridge, Batchworth
(circa 1895)

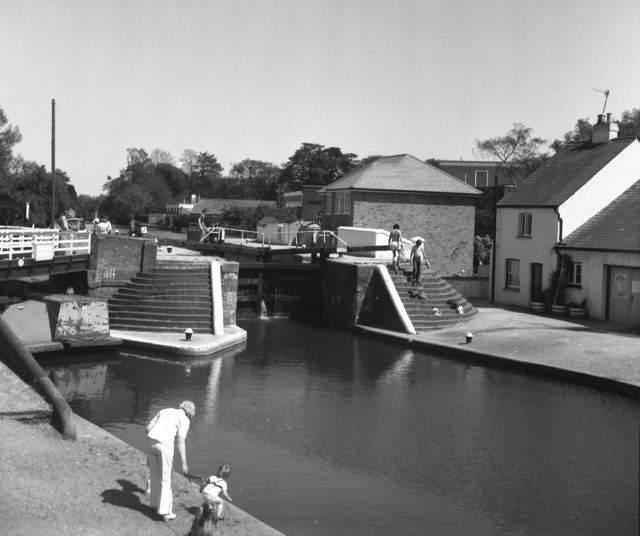
Batchworth Lock No 81
Grand Union Canal
From the A404 bridge, Batchworth (1977)

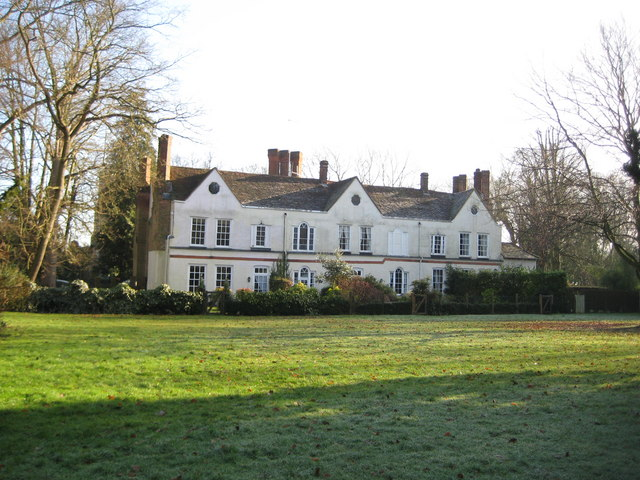
The Bury

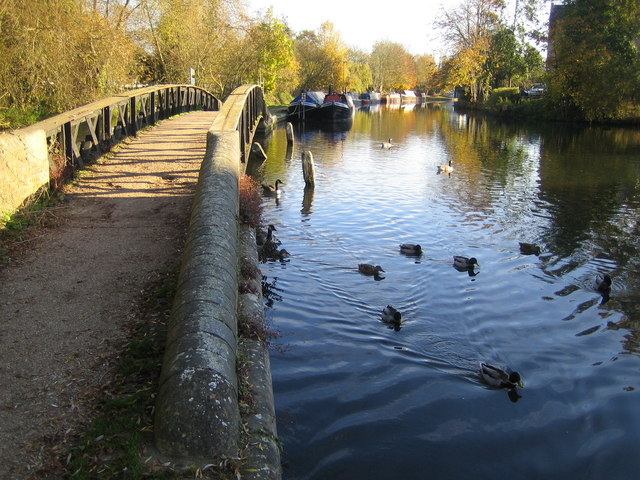
Grand Union Canal in Batchworth

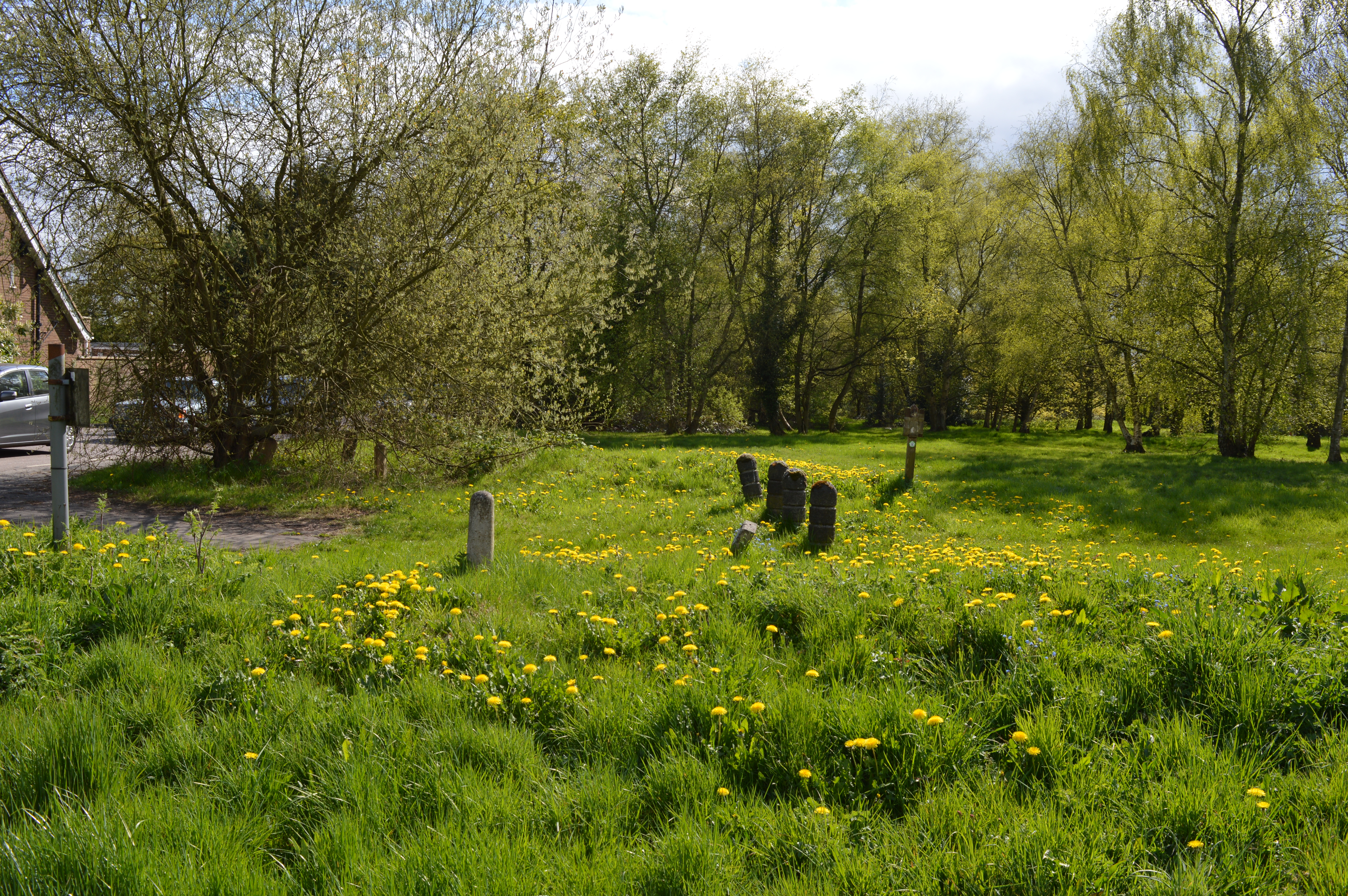
Batchworth Heath

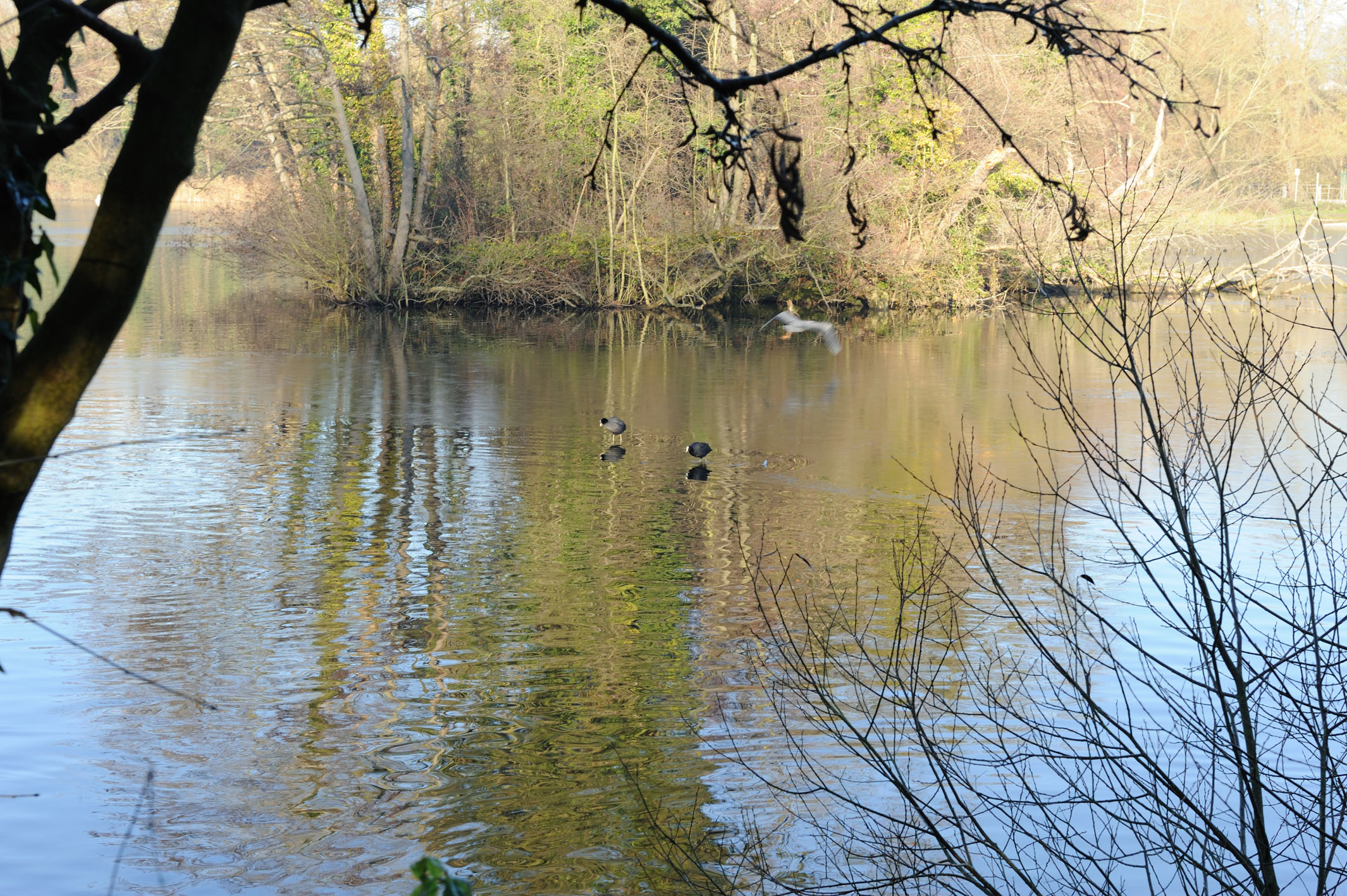
Batchworth Lake

== See also ==
Local government in England
