= Moor Park, Hertfordshire =

Residential estate in Hertfordshire, England

Coordinates: 51.6298°N 0.4315°W

Moor Park
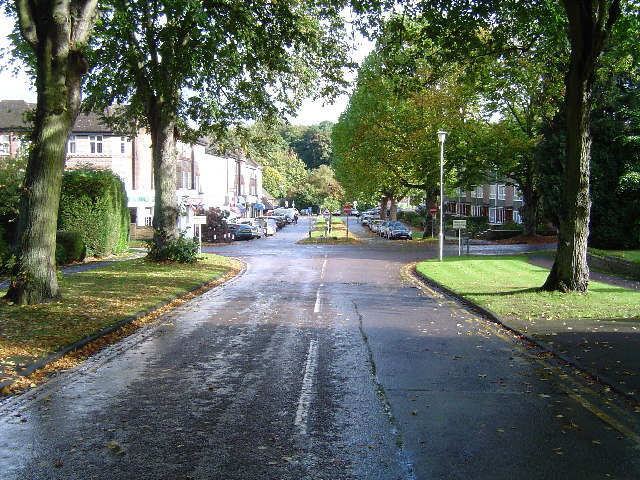
- Main Avenue, Moor Park

- Location within Hertfordshire
- Population: 5,532 (2011)
- OS grid reference: TQ085935
  - London: 16 mi (26 km) SE
- Civil parish: Batchworth
- District: Three Rivers
- Shire county: Hertfordshire
- Region: East
- Country: England
- Sovereign state: United Kingdom
- Post town: NORTHWOOD
- Postcode district: HA6
- Post town: RICKMANSWORTH
- Postcode district: WD3
- Dialling code: 01923
- Police: Hertfordshire
- Fire: Hertfordshire
- Ambulance: East of England
- UK Parliament: South West Hertfordshire

Moor Park is an affluent private residential estate in the Three Rivers District of Hertfordshire, England. It is amongst the most prestigious and sought-after addresses on the outskirts of London and is recognised as one of the five established millionaire neighbourhoods in Hertfordshire. It is located approximately 16 miles (26 km) northwest of central London and adjacent to the Greater London boundary.

== History ==
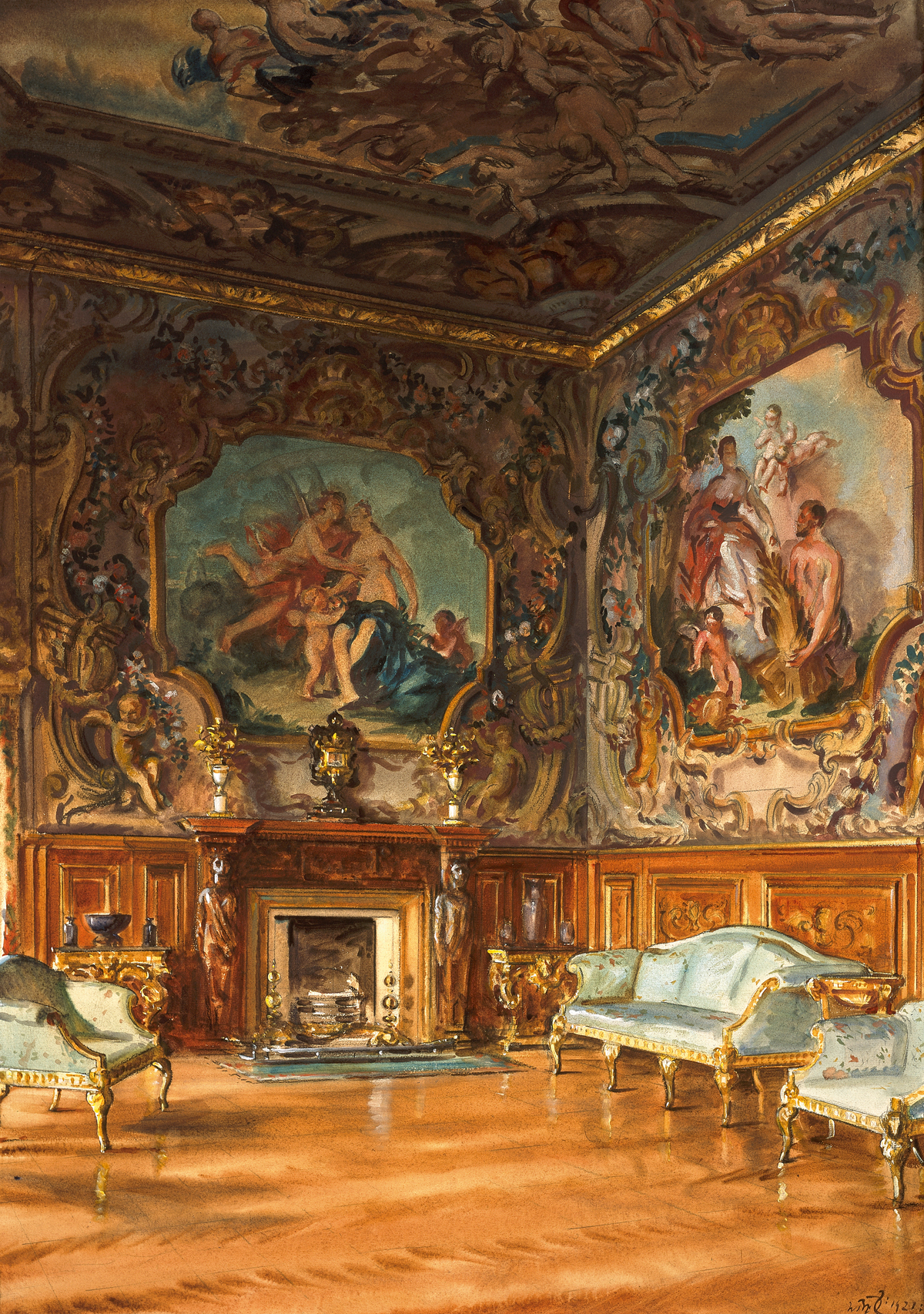
The Saloon, Moor Park, Hertfordshire, William Bruce Ellis Ranken

Moor Park takes its name from Moor Park, a country house which was originally built in 1678–9 for James, Duke of Monmouth, and was reconstructed in the Palladian style circa 1720 by Giacomo Leoni. It is built on what used to be an area of Ruislip Moor, which is where the name Moor Park originates. The house and grounds are now occupied by Moor Park Golf Club.

Moor Park Golf Club has two championship golf courses designed by Harry Colt.

Moor Park was located in the ancient parish of Rickmansworth, Hertfordshire, on the boundary with the parish of Ruislip, Middlesex. It is now in the civil parish of Batchworth, since 1 April 2017.

== Geography ==
The area borders Northwood in Greater London to the south. The estate is around 6 square miles (16 km^{2}) in size, with gated, private roads; extending from Ruislip Woods through to Northwood, and finishing at Merchant Taylors' School. The majority of the area lies in the Northwood post town and the distinguished HA6 postcode district. The surrounding neighbourhood consists mostly of elegant upscale houses, many boasting original 1930s features.

The Moor Park Conservation Area was designated on 18 May 1995, to preserve the tree-lined, wide avenues with period properties and open frontage gardens. Notable characteristics include lush grass verges, shingle paths and original cast iron Victorian-influenced lamp posts. Moor Park is surrounded on three sides by countryside which is designated Green Belt and adjoining, but outside, the conservation area, are the old Roman remains around Bathend Clump.

Moor Park is home to a diverse community with a large Christian and Hindu presence. Residents include many notable millionaire business owners, city executives, medical professionals and philanthropists.

== Transport ==
The estate is serviced by Moor Park tube station, which is the only TFL station to sit inside a gated private estate, and provides easy access into London via the Metropolitan line.

There are no bus routes that serve the estate, therefore any connections from the tube station must be made on foot or by car.
