= 2024 Three Rivers District Council election =

English local election

2024 Three Rivers District Council
- 2 May 2024

13 out of 39 seats to Three Rivers District Council 20 seats needed for a majority

	First party	Second party	Third party
Leader	Sarah Nelmes	Oliver Cooper	Stephen Cox
Party	Liberal Democrats	Conservative	Labour
Last election	22 seats, 41.9%	11 seats, 32.5%	3 seats, 13.9%
Seats before	21	12	3
Seats won	7	4	1
Seats after	21	12	3
Seat change	Steady	Steady	Steady
Popular vote	9,826	7,497	3,082
Percentage	42.3%	32.3%	13.3%
Swing	▲0.4%	▼0.2%	▼0.6%
	Fourth party	Fifth party
Leader	Chris Mitchell
Party	Green	Independent
Last election	2 seats, 11.8%	1 seat, 0.0%
Seats before	2	1
Seats won	1	0
Seats after	3	0
Seat change	▲1	▼1
Popular vote	2,804	N/A
Percentage	12.1%	N/A
Swing	▲0.3%	N/A
- Winner of each seat at the 2024 Three Rivers District Council election
Leader before election
Sarah Nelmes
Liberal Democrats
Leader after election
Stephen Giles-Medhurst
Liberal Democrats

The 2024 Three Rivers District Council election took place on 2 May 2024 to elect members of Three Rivers District Council in Hertfordshire, England. This was on the same day as other local elections.

== Summary ==
The council remained under Liberal Democrat majority control. After the election the Liberal Democrats changed their group leader to Stephen Giles-Medhurst, who was formally appointed as leader of the council at the subsequent annual council meeting on 21 May 2024.

=== Election result ===
Three Rivers District Council composition following the 2024 local elections

2024 Three Rivers District Council
Party	This election				Full council			This election		
Party	Candidates	Seats	Net	Seats %	Other	Total	Total %	Votes	Votes %	+/−
Liberal Democrats	{{{candidates}}}	7	Steady	53.8	14	21	52.6	9,826	42.3	+0.4
Conservative	{{{candidates}}}	4	Steady	30.3	8	12	31.6	7,497	32.3	–0.2
Labour	{{{candidates}}}	1	Steady	7.7	2	3	7.9	3,082	13.3	–0.6
Green	{{{candidates}}}	1	▲1	7.7	2	3	7.9	2,804	12.1	+0.3
Independent	{{{candidates}}}	0	▼1	0.0	0	0	0.0	N/A	N/A	N/A

== Ward results ==
The Statement of Persons Nominated, which details the candidates standing in each ward, was released by Three Rivers District Council following the close of nominations on 8 April 2024.

=== Abbots Langley and Bedmond ===
Abbots Langley and Bedmond
Party	Candidate	Votes	%	±%
Liberal Democrats	Matthew Bedford*	939	58.5	+4.3
Conservative	Hitesh Tailor	322	20.1	−6.6
Labour	James Farrington	222	13.8	+0.7
Green	Michael Rayment	121	7.5	+1.5
Majority				
Turnout		1,604	33.1	
Registered electors				
Liberal Democrats hold		Swing		

=== Carpenders Park ===
Carpenders Park
Party	Candidate	Votes	%	±%
Conservative	Christopher Alley	757	41.8	−20.0
Liberal Democrats	Kate Turner	587	32.4	+21.0
Labour	William Waite	335	18.5	−4.6
Green	Deesha Chandra	130	7.2	+3.4
Majority				
Turnout		1,809	34.7	
Registered electors				
Conservative hold		Swing		

=== Chorleywood North and Sarratt ===
Chorleywood North and Sarratt
Party	Candidate	Votes	%	±%
Conservative	Ciaran Reed*	1,160	58.8	±0.0
Liberal Democrats	Frank Mahon-Daly	576	29.2	+1.1
Labour	Margaret Gallagher	128	6.5	+0.5
Green	Peter Loader	109	5.5	−1.6
Majority				
Turnout		1,973	34.8	
Registered electors				
Conservative hold		Swing		

=== Chorleywood South and Maple Cross ===
Chorleywood South and Maple Cross
Party	Candidate	Votes	%	±%
Liberal Democrats	Harry Davies*	1,050	55.2	−1.2
Conservative	Oliver Neville	540	28.4	−1.0
Green	Roger Stafford	163	8.6	−2.3
Labour	Iain Roden	148	7.8	−1.9
Majority				
Turnout		1,901	33.1	
Registered electors				
Liberal Democrats hold		Swing		

=== Dickinsons ===
Dickinsons
Party	Candidate	Votes	%	±%
Green	Cheryl Stungo	1,045	49.6	−5.3
Liberal Democrats	Paul Rainbow*	803	38.1	−1.8
Conservative	David Redman	163	7.7	N/A
Labour	Jeni Swift Gillett	97	4.6	−0.6
Majority				
Turnout		2,108	42.1	
Registered electors				
Green gain from Liberal Democrats		Swing		

=== Durrants ===
Durrants
Party	Candidate	Votes	%	±%
Liberal Democrats	Chris Lloyd*	1,303	65.0	+9.3
Green	Angus Glasser	423	21.1	−3.8
Conservative	Salem al-Damluji	172	8.6	−4.5
Labour	John Grillo	107	5.3	−1.1
Majority				
Turnout		2,005	40.8	
Registered electors				
Liberal Democrats hold		Swing		

=== Gade Valley ===
Gade Valley
Party	Candidate	Votes	%	±%
Liberal Democrats	Elinor Gazzard	668	50.2	−2.1
Conservative	Vicky Edwards	352	26.5	+1.7
Labour	Bruce Prochnik	226	17.0	−0.5
Green	Andrew Gallagher	84	6.3	+0.9
Majority				
Turnout		1,330	26.6	
Registered electors				
Liberal Democrats hold		Swing		

=== Leavesden ===
Leavesden
Party	Candidate	Votes	%	±%
Liberal Democrats	Stephen Giles-Medhurst*	933	55.2	+1.2
Conservative	Anne Jervis	409	24.2	−0.8
Labour	Marie-Louise Nolan	250	14.8	−1.2
Green	Bruce Perry	97	5.7	+0.7
Majority				
Turnout		1,689	29.1	
Registered electors				
Liberal Democrats hold		Swing		

=== Moor Park and Eastbury ===
Moor Park and Eastbury
Party	Candidate	Votes	%	±%
Conservative	Debbie Morris*	1,067	72.0	−1.1
Liberal Democrats	Laura Thompson	193	13.0	−1.6
Green	Matt Jones	119	8.0	+2.8
Labour	Mashkoor Khan	102	6.9	−0.2
Majority				
Turnout		1,481	33.3	
Registered electors				
Conservative hold		Swing		

=== Oxhey Hall and Hayling ===
Oxhey Hall and Hayling
Party	Candidate	Votes	%	±%
Liberal Democrats	Andrew Scarth*	1,031	56.3	+3.2
Conservative	Vishal Patel	398	21.7	+1.7
Labour	Jason St John	307	16.8	−5.9
Green	Mary Chabrel	95	5.2	+1.0
Majority				
Turnout		1,831	34.4	
Registered electors				
Liberal Democrats hold		Swing		

=== Penn and Mill End ===
Penn and Mill End
Party	Candidate	Votes	%	±%
Liberal Democrats	Tom Smith	630	42.4	−7.2
Conservative	Mike Sims	532	35.8	+3.6
Labour	Martin Waldron	180	12.1	+1.4
Green	Malcolm Lee	145	9.8	+2.3
Majority				
Turnout		1,487	28.9	
Registered electors				
Liberal Democrats hold		Swing		

This seat was previously held by Roger Seabourne, originally elected as a Liberal Democrat candidate, but changed affiliation to an independent prior to the 2024 election. He is not re-standing.

=== Rickmansworth Town ===
Rickmansworth Town
Party	Candidate	Votes	%	±%
Conservative	Lisa Hudson*	1,057	43.7	+0.7
Liberal Democrats	Pav Dhyani	1,009	41.7	+4.2
Labour	Janet Cullen	192	7.9	−2.4
Green	Stephen Martin	161	6.7	−2.5
Majority				
Turnout		2,419	43.5	
Registered electors				
Conservative hold		Swing		

=== South Oxhey ===
South Oxhey
Party	Candidate	Votes	%	±%
Labour	Joan King*	788	50.1	−9.2
Conservative	Kavan Trivedi	568	36.1	+8.5
Green	Chris Lawrence	112	7.1	+1.4
Liberal Democrats	Rhys Southall	104	6.6	−0.8
Majority				
Turnout		1,572	28.9	
Registered electors				
Labour hold		Swing		

== Changes 2024–2026 ==
- Around the time of the 2024 elections, Ian Morris, elected as a Conservative, left the party to sit as an independent.
- A by-election was triggered by the resignation of Conservative councillor David Raw.

Rickmansworth Town by-election, 4 July 2024
Party	Candidate	Votes	%	±%
Conservative	Mike Sims	1,694	43.2	−0.5
Liberal Democrats	Pav Dhyani	1,329	33.9	−7.8
Labour	Janet Cullen	513	13.1	+5.2
Green	Stephen Martin	383	9.8	+3.1
Majority				
Turnout		3,945	68.39	
Registered electors		5,768		
Conservative hold		Swing		

- A by-election was triggered by the resignation of Liberal Democrat councillor Matthew Bedford.

Abbots Langley and Bedmond by-election, 22 August 2024
Party	Candidate	Votes	%	±%
Conservative	Vicky Edwards	593	40.5	+20.4
Liberal Democrats	Alex Turner	500	34.2	−24.3
Green	Jane Powell	233	15.9	+8.4
Labour	Pierce Culliton	137	9.4	−4.4
Majority				
Turnout		1,471	29.54	
Registered electors		4,979		
Conservative gain from Liberal Democrats		Swing		

- A by-election was triggered by the resignation of Liberal Democrat councillor Sarah Bedford.

Abbots Langley and Bedmond by-election, 19 March 2025
Party	Candidate	Votes	%	±%
Conservative	Ian Campbell	657	40.0	+19.9
Liberal Democrats	Aidan Bentley	552	33.6	−24.9
Reform	Gavin Casey	214	13.0	+N/A
Green	Jane Powell	128	7.8	+0.3
Labour	Pierce Culliton	91	5.5	−8.3
Majority				
Turnout		1,643	33.59	
Registered electors		4,891		
Conservative gain from Liberal Democrats		Swing		

Durrants by-election, 2 May 2025
Party	Candidate	Votes	%	±%
Liberal Democrats	Paul Rainbow	1,010	49.3	−15.7
Green	Andrew Gallagher	457	22.3	+1.2
Reform	George Moss	374	18.3	N/A
Conservative	Gordon Elvey	161	7.9	−0.7
Labour	Jeni Swift Gillett	45	2.2	−3.1
Majority				
Turnout		2,055	41.30	
Registered electors		4,976		
Liberal Democrats hold		Swing		
