= Three Rivers District =

Coordinates: 51°38′19.28″N 0°28′9.46″W

Three Rivers Three Rivers District
- Non-metropolitan district
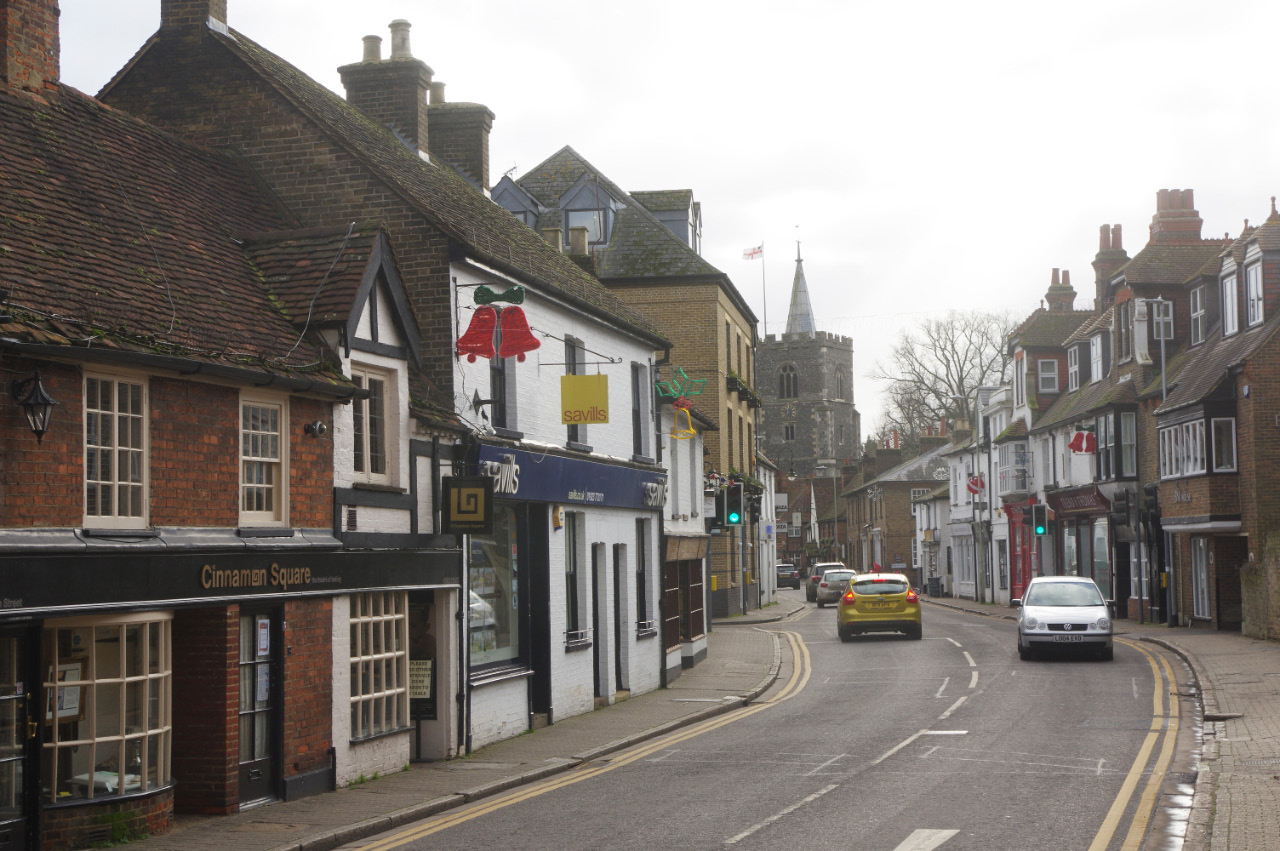
- Church Street, Rickmansworth

- Three Rivers shown within Hertfordshire
- Sovereign state: United Kingdom
- Constituent country: England
- Region: East of England
- Non-metropolitan county: Hertfordshire
- Status: Non-metropolitan district
- Admin HQ: Rickmansworth
- Incorporated: 1 April 1974

Government
  - Type: Non-metropolitan district council
  - Body: Three Rivers District Council
  - MPs: Gagan Mohindra

Area
  - Total: 34.3 sq mi (88.8 km^{2})
  - Rank: 206th (of 296)

Population (2024)
  - Total: 95,807
  - Rank: 258th (of 296)
  - Density: 2,790/sq mi (1,080/km^{2})

Ethnicity (2021)
  - Ethnic groups: List: 77.1% White; 15.2% Asian; 3.6% Mixed; 2.4% Black; 1.7% other

Religion (2021)
  - Religion: List: 47.6% Christianity; 30.8% no religion; 8.3% Hinduism; 8.0% other; 3.7% Islam; 1.6% Judaism
- Time zone: UTC0 (GMT)
  - Summer (DST): UTC+1 (BST)
- ONS code: 26UJ (ONS); E07000102 (GSS)
- OS grid reference: TQ0591494481

Three Rivers is a local government district in south-west Hertfordshire, England. Its council is based in Rickmansworth. The district borders Hertsmere, Watford, St Albans, Dacorum, Buckinghamshire, and the London boroughs of Hillingdon and Harrow.

== History ==
Three Rivers District was created on 1 April 1974 under the Local Government Act 1972, covering the whole area of two former districts and most of a third, which were all abolished at the same time:

- Chorleywood Urban District
- Rickmansworth Urban District
- Watford Rural District, except the parish of Aldenham, which went to Hertsmere, and the part within the designated area of Hemel Hempstead New Town, which went to Dacorum.

The new district was named "Three Rivers", referencing the rivers Chess, Colne, and Gade which flow through the district and have their confluence in Rickmansworth, the largest town in the district.

Under current local government reorganisation plans, all district councils in Hertfordshire, as well as the county council, will be abolished in 2028, with the district becoming part of a new South West Hertfordshire unitary authority.

== Governance ==
Three Rivers District Council

Type
- Type: Non-metropolitan district

Leadership
- Chair: Keith Martin, Labour since 19 May 2026
- Leader: Stephen Giles-Medhurst, Liberal Democrats since 21 May 2024
- Chief Executive: Joanne Wagstaffe since 3 February 2020

Structure
- Seats: 39 councillors
- Political groups: Administration (18) Liberal Democrats (18) Other parties (21) Conservative (14) Green (3) Labour (2) Independent (2)

Elections
- Voting system: First past the post
- Last election: 7 May 2026

Meeting place
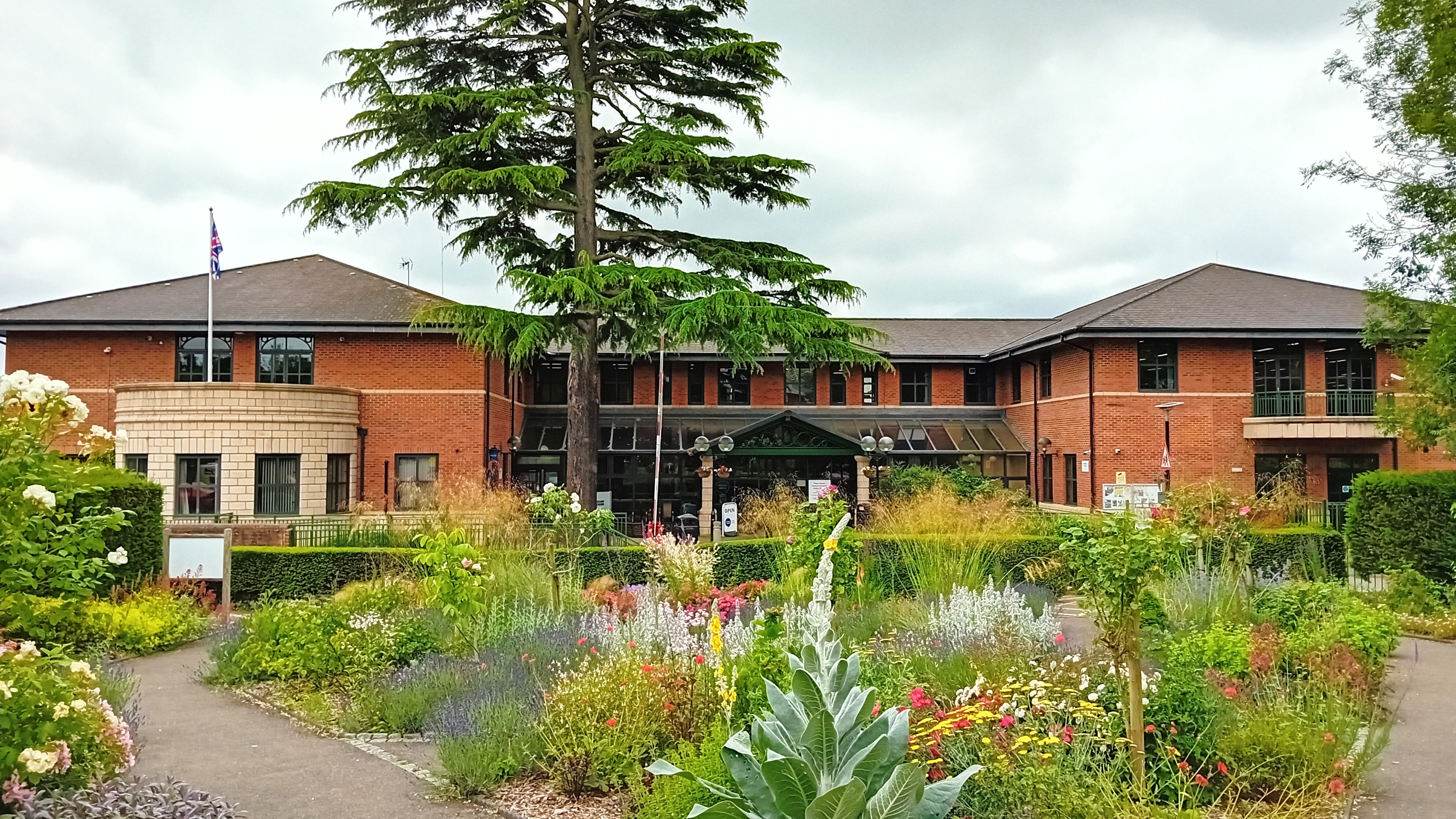
- Three Rivers House, Northway, Rickmansworth, WD3 1RL

Website
- threerivers.gov.uk

Hertfordshire has a two-tier structure of local government, with the ten district councils (including Three Rivers District Council) providing district-level services, and Hertfordshire County Council providing county-level services. In some areas there is an additional third tier of civil parishes.

=== Responsibilities ===
Three Rivers District Council carries out a variety of district council functions including:

- Benefits - Housing and Council Tax
- Car Parking
- Concessionary Travel
- Council Tax - Administration and Collection
- Elections and Electoral Registration
- Environmental Health
- Food Safety and Hygiene Complaints
- Noise Pollution and Pest Control
- Housing Administration
- Licensing
- Caravan Sites
- Town Planning
- Public Conveniences
- Health and Leisure Centres
- Refuse Collection
- Recycling
- Tourism and Visitor Information

=== Political control ===
The council has been under no overall control since a by-election in August 2024, having previously been under Liberal Democrat majority control since 2018.

The first election to Three Rivers District Council was held in 1973, initially acting as a shadow authority alongside the outgoing authorities until the new arrangements took effect on 1 April 1974. Political control since 1974 has been as follows:

Party in control	Years
No overall control	1974–1976
Conservative	1976–1986
No overall control	1986–1987
Alliance	1987–1988
Liberal Democrats	1988–1990
No overall control	1990–1999
Liberal Democrats	1999–2015
No overall control	2015–2016
Liberal Democrats	2017–2018
No overall control	2018–2018
Liberal Democrats	2018–2024
No overall control	2024–

=== Leadership ===
The leaders of the council since 2016 have been:

Councillor	Party	From	To
Ann Shaw	Liberal Democrats		17 May 2016
Sara Bedford	Liberal Democrats	17 May 2016	14 Jul 2020
Sarah Nelmes	Liberal Democrats	14 Jul 2020	21 May 2024
Stephen Giles-Medhurst	Liberal Democrats	21 May 2024	

=== Composition ===
Following the 2026 election, the composition of the council was:

Party	Councillors
Liberal Democrats	18
Conservative	14
Green	3
Labour	2
Independent	2
Total	39

The next elections are scheduled for 2027, but may be affected by the upcoming structural changes to local government in England.

=== Premises ===
The council's main offices are at Three Rivers House on Northway in the centre of Rickmansworth, which was purpose-built for the council in 1991. The site had been part of the grounds of Basing House, which had bought by the old Rickmansworth Urban District Council in 1930 to serve as its headquarters.

== Elections ==
Since the last boundary changes in 2014 the council has comprised 39 councillors representing 13 wards, each of which elects three councillors. Elections are held three years out of every four, electing one councillor from each ward each time. Elections to Hertfordshire County Council are held in the fourth year of the cycle when there are no district council elections.

=== Wards ===
The wards of the district are:

- Abbots Langley and Bedmond
- Carpenders Park
- Chorleywood North and Sarratt
- Chorleywood South and Maple Cross
- Dickinsons
- Durrants
- Gade Valley
- Leavesden
- Moor Park and Eastbury
- Oxhey Hall and Hayling
- Penn and Mill End
- Rickmansworth Town
- South Oxhey

=== Wider politics ===
==== County council ====
For elections to Hertfordshire County Council, the district is divided into six divisions, three of which are held by the Conservatives, and three by the Liberal Democrats:

Hertfordshire County Councillors for divisions in Three Rivers
Division	Councillor	Party
Abbots Langley	Stephen Giles-Medhurst	Liberal Democrats
Croxley	Chris Lloyd	Liberal Democrats
Rickmansworth East and Oxhey Park	Vishal Patel	Conservative
Rickmansworth West	Paula Hiscocks	Conservative
South Oxhey and Eastbury	Christopher Alley	Conservative
Three Rivers Rural	Louise Price	Liberal Democrats

==== Parliament ====
For parliamentary elections, the entire district has been part of the South West Hertfordshire constituency since the 2024 general election. The constituency is not quite coterminous with the district, however, as it also contains the ward of Kings Langley from the Dacorum district. The current MP is Gagan Mohindra of the Conservative Party.

== Rail ==
Train services are provided by Chiltern Railways and the Metropolitan line of the London Underground.

London Underground stations:

- Chorleywood
- Croxley
- Rickmansworth
- Moor Park

Chiltern Railways stations:

- Chorleywood
- Rickmansworth

A special fare structure exists as the stations are outside the Greater London boundary.

London Overground stations:

- Carpenders Park

West Coast Main Line stations:

- Kings Langley

== Settlements ==
- Abbots Langley
- Chorleywood
- Croxley Green
- Loudwater
- Maple Cross
- Moor Park
- Rickmansworth
- Sarratt
- South Oxhey

== Civil parishes ==
Three Rivers is partially parished. There are six civil parishes in the district:

- Abbots Langley
- Batchworth
- Chorleywood
- Croxley Green
- Sarratt
- Watford Rural

There are also two unparished areas in the district, both comprising parts of the former Rickmansworth Urban District which have not subsequently been added to a parish: one larger area including Maple Cross and Mill End, Rickmansworth; and a smaller area including part of Loudwater.
