= 2021 United Kingdom local elections =

Elections to local councils and mayoralties

- 6 May 2021

145 of 385 councils in England; 13 directly elected mayors in England; 39 Police and crime commissioners in England and Wales
- Turnout: 35.6%
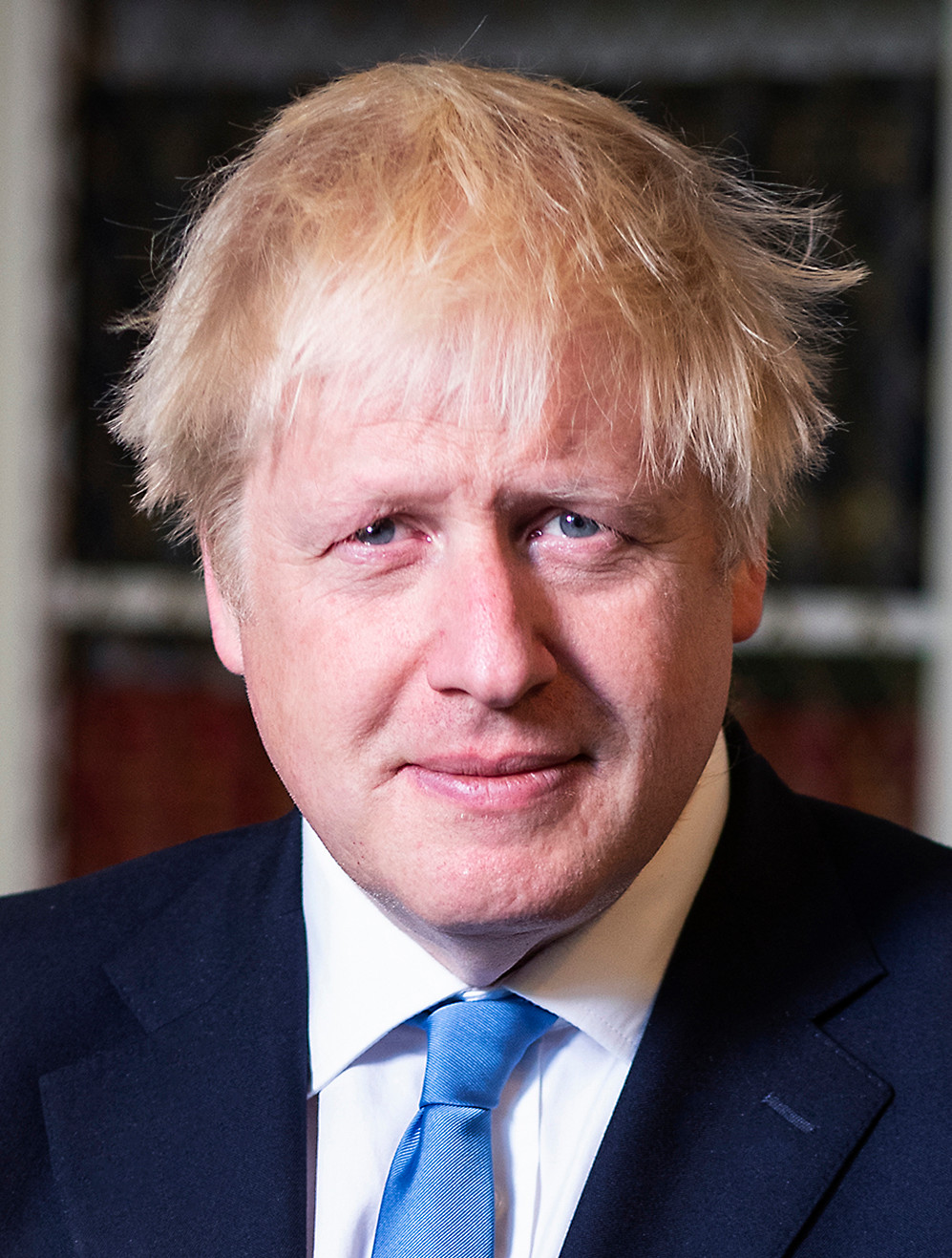

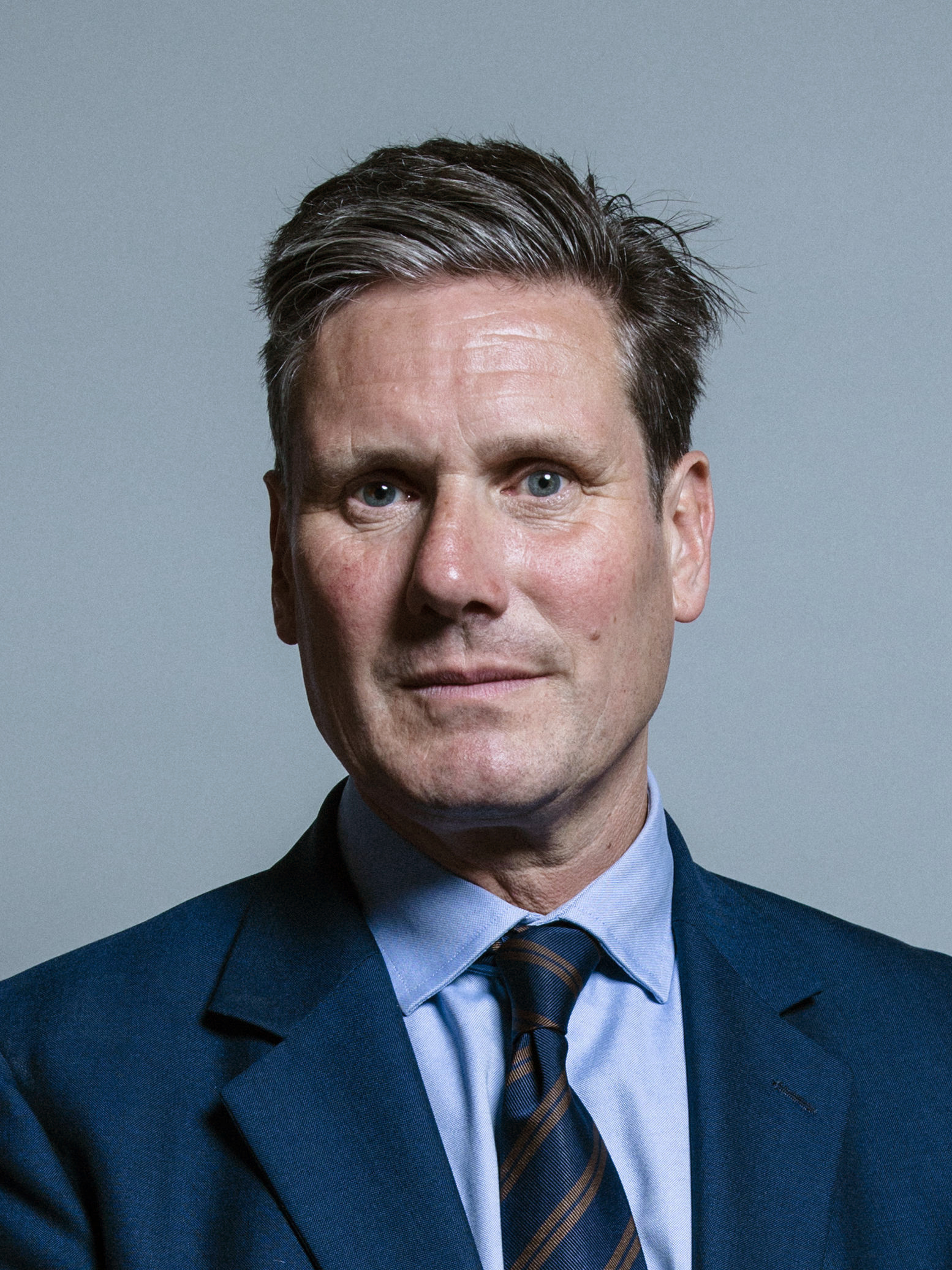

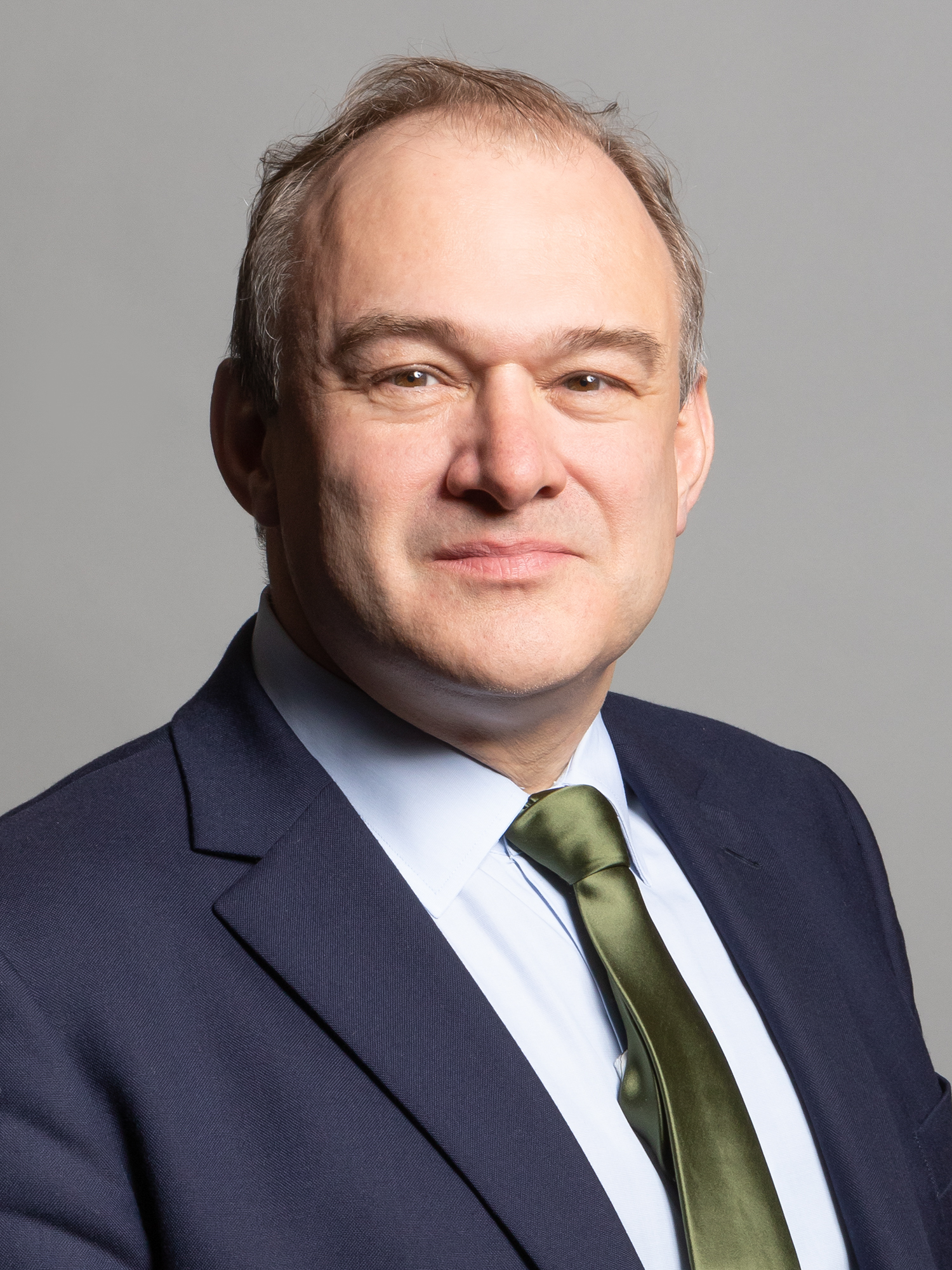

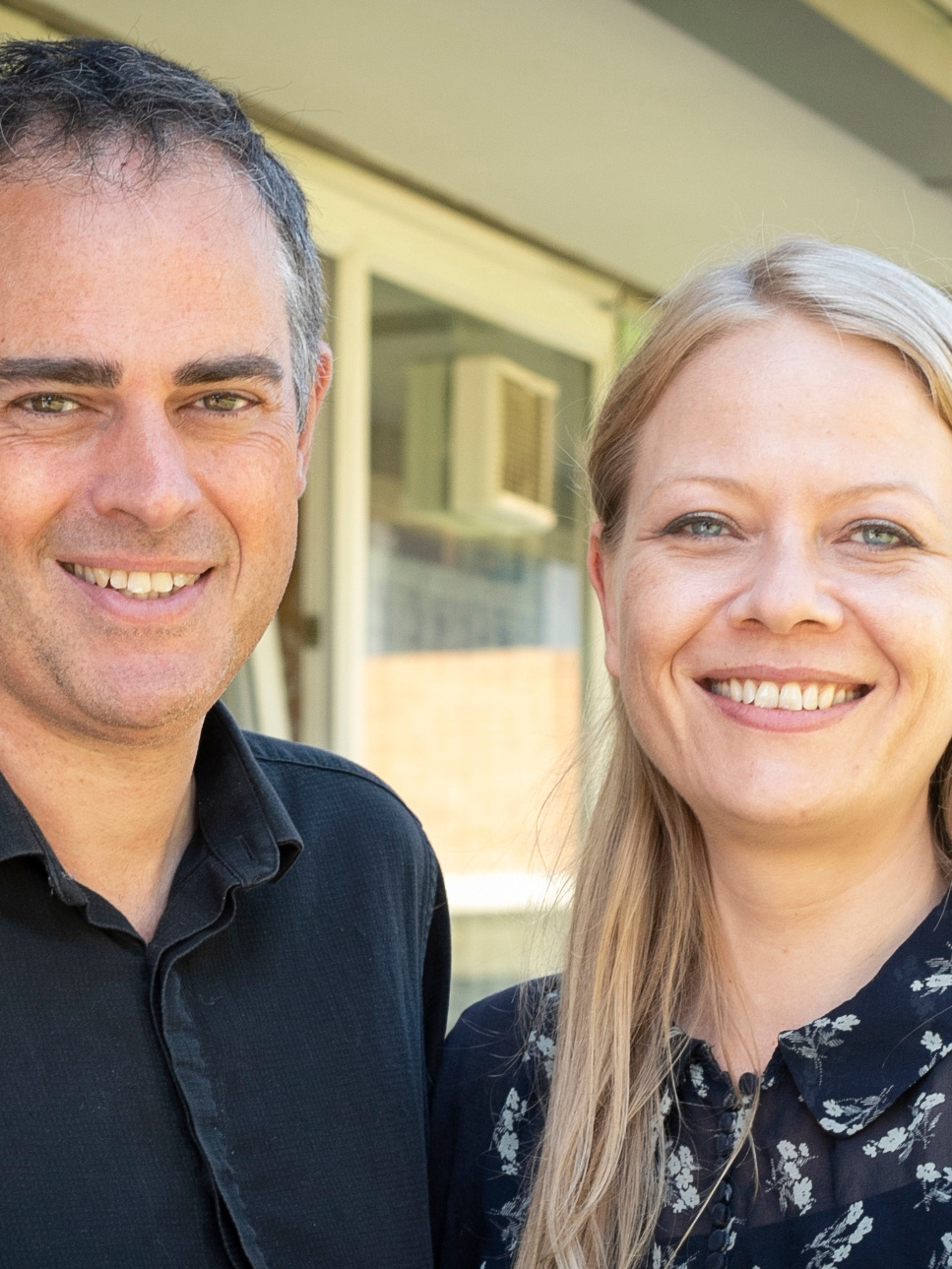
Leader	Boris Johnson	Keir Starmer
Party	Conservative	Labour
Leader since	23 July 2019	4 April 2020
Seats before	7,531 seats 127 councils	6,339 seats 92 councils
Projected vote share (Note: All vote shares in the infobox are projected national vote shares calculated by the BBC.)	36% ▲8%	29% ▲1%
Seats won (2021)	2,345; 63 councils	1,345; 44 councils
Councillors (after)	7,606; 140 councils	5,911; 84 councils
Net change (notional)	▲235 ▲13 councils	▼327 ▼8 councils
Leader	Ed Davey	Jonathan Bartley & Siân Berry
Party	Liberal Democrats	Green
Leader since	27 August 2020	2 September 2016 / 4 September 2018
Seats before	2,556 seats 21 councils	378 seats 0 councils
Projected vote share	17% ▼2%	10% n/a
Seats won (2021)	588; 7 councils	151; 0 councils
Councillors (after)	2,513; 22 councils	461; 0 councils
Net change (notional)	▲8 ▲1 councils	▲88; 0 councils

Results in district, borough, and unitary councils

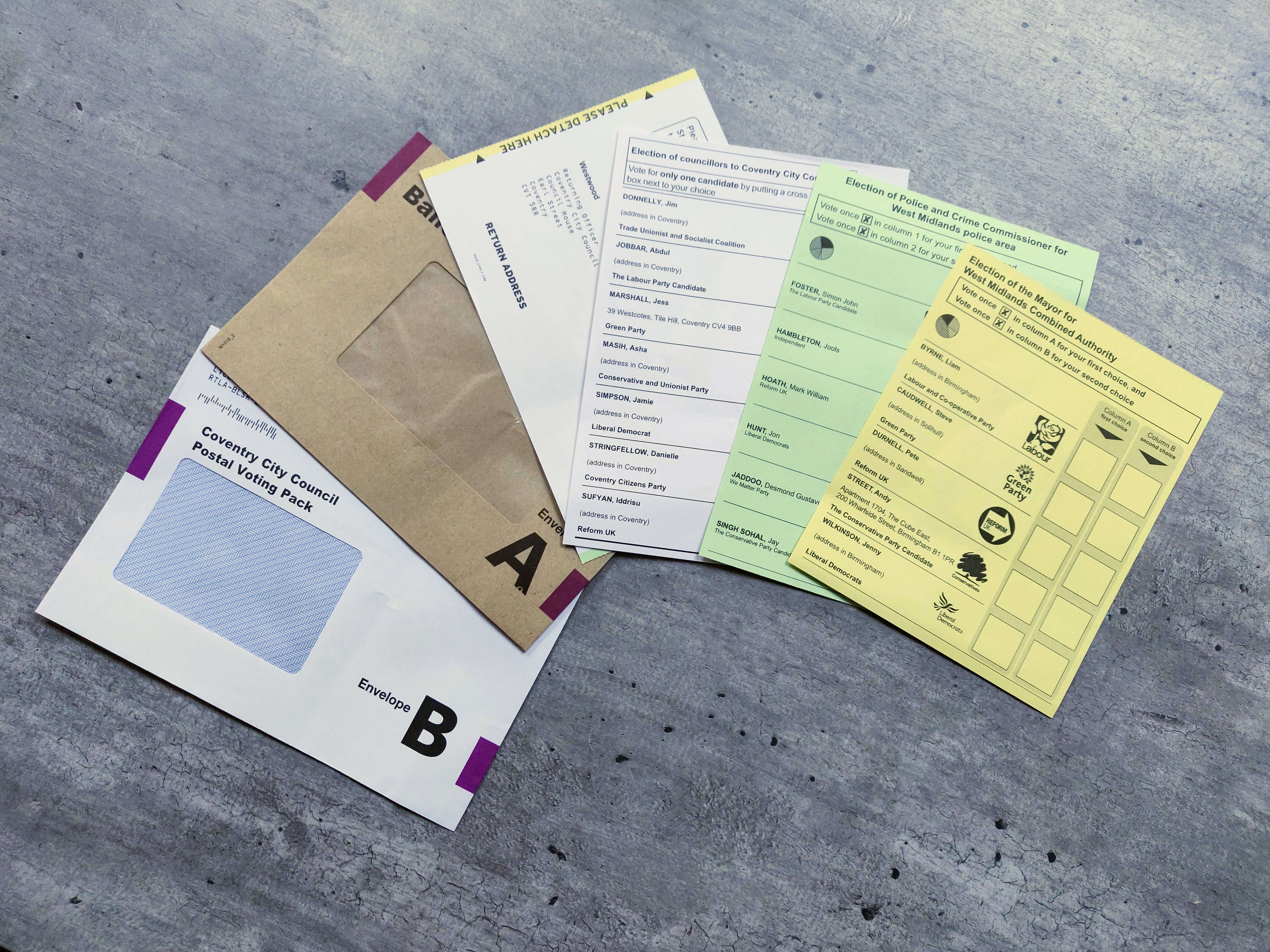
Postal voting pack used in the 2021 local elections: white for local councillors, yellow for mayoral elections and green for police and crime commissioner

The 2021 United Kingdom local elections were held on Thursday 6 May 2021. More than 145 English local councils, around 5,000 councillor seats (including by-elections), thirteen directly elected mayors in England, and 39 police and crime commissioners in England and Wales were contested. On the same day, the 2021 Hartlepool by-election took place, and there were also elections to the Scottish Parliament (129 seats), Senedd (Welsh Parliament) (60 seats) and London Assembly (25 seats), the last in conjunction with the London mayoral election.

In March 2020, the government announced that the elections scheduled for 7 May 2020 would be delayed for a year due to the COVID-19 pandemic. They were now held at the same time as the elections previously scheduled for 2021. The seats up for election were those last contested in 2016 and 2017. New unitary authorities to replace the county and district councils in Northamptonshire and Buckinghamshire held their inaugural elections this year. Due to the cancellation of the 2020 local elections, these were the first local elections the three main parties contested under the leaderships of Prime Minister Boris Johnson of the Conservatives, Keir Starmer of Labour, and Ed Davey of the Liberal Democrats.

The governing Conservative Party made significant gains in the elections. Despite initial predictions that the party would perform better in the seats last contested in 2016, but worse in the ones contested in 2017 (when the party benefited from the then-exceptionally high approval ratings of Theresa May's government in the run-up to that year's general election), they in fact performed even better in both sets of seats. Many observers attributed their performance to the successful rollout of the country's COVID-19 vaccination programme. Conversely, Labour's poor performance was generally ascribed to the party still being viewed by much of the working class as having been discredited by its prior opposition to Brexit, as well as Starmer's perceived opportunism in attacking Johnson over the Downing Street refurbishment controversy. The Liberal Democrats made some minor gains despite a loss in their popular vote share, while the Green Party made more substantial gains.

== Background ==
The local elections in May 2019 across a majority of councils in England saw the Conservative Party suffer significant losses to the Liberal Democrats, who regained councils they lost to the Conservatives in 2015. The Labour Party, despite making some gains, had a net loss of over eighty seats in areas that had traditionally voted for them, particularly to independent candidates. Local elections also took place at the same time in Northern Ireland, which saw a rise in the Alliance Party's representation across the region. At the 2019 European Parliament election, a few weeks later, the Conservatives had their lowest share of the vote in a nationwide election in their history, with the Brexit Party and the Liberal Democrats coming first and second, respectively.

On 12 December 2019, the UK held a snap general election that led to the Conservatives winning a majority of eighty in the House of Commons, while Labour had their worst share of the seats since the 1935 general election. Following the election result, Jeremy Corbyn announced that he would step down as leader of the Labour Party; Keir Starmer was elected the new leader on 4 April 2020. The Liberal Democrats also held a leadership election after Jo Swinson lost her seat in the general election; in the interim, the party's deputy leader Ed Davey and party president Mark Pack acted as co-leaders, and in August Davey was elected as leader.

Prior to the elections, structural changes to local government in England merged some district and county councils into unitary authorities, which meant more power was consolidated; an example is Buckinghamshire Council, which replaced five councils in April 2020. In addition, new combined authorities (institutions which cover two or more local authorities) are being created, with the electorate of the West Yorkshire Combined Authority electing their mayor at this election. Intentions to reorganise councils in Cumbria, North Yorkshire and Somerset caused elections in those areas to be rescheduled for 2022. More combined authorities and significant reorganisations were planned, but in 2020 the COVID-19 pandemic slowed down the government's devolution program for England.

=== Postponement to 2021 ===
A pandemic of a new strand of coronavirus spread across the world from February 2020. On 1 March, Health Secretary Matt Hancock issued a warning that "all options" were being considered if the virus spread further, including delaying the local elections, for the first time since the 2001 elections which were delayed by a month due to the foot-and-mouth outbreak. On 12 March, the Association of Electoral Administrators asked the government to consider postponing the elections should the situation in the UK deteriorate. The same day, the Electoral Commission recommended that the elections be delayed till the autumn.

A day later, Prime Minister Boris Johnson decided to postpone the 2020 UK local elections until May 2021. This decision was legislated for in the Coronavirus Act 2020, which was enacted on 25 March. The bill gave the government the power to postpone any elections, including by-elections, which would otherwise have been held between 16 March 2020 and 5 May 2021. To preserve the four-year electoral cycle, those elected in 2021 would serve three-year terms.

On 4 November 2020, the Cabinet Office ruled out any further delays to local elections, after suggestions from some local authorities to defer the elections by a couple of weeks, in order to allow enough time to get the electoral roll in order without having to knock on doors during the second wave of the pandemic. After the country went into a third national lockdown in January 2021, the County Councils Network called on Johnson to declare "as soon as possible" whether the elections would go ahead as planned. Suggestions had been put forward include delaying the elections until June or July; delaying them until the Autumn; and conducting them in May but entirely via postal voting. On 9 January election officials stated that the local elections will take place as planned. However Johnson said this remains "under review". It was confirmed in February by Chloe Smith and the Cabinet Office that the elections would in fact take place in line with the government's target to vaccinate all over 50s by the beginning of May.

=== By-elections ===
The Coronavirus Act 2020 also postponed by-elections to fill casual vacancies occurring because a sitting councillor resigned or died. On 15 March 2021, it was reported that more than 260 by-elections would take place alongside the planned council elections.

In Bournemouth, Christchurch and Poole, by-elections were held in the wards of Canford Heath and Commons. Four by-elections in the London Borough of Lewisham were also held.

=== Restrictions on campaigns ===
In January 2021, government guidance on activity during the national lockdown was issued by the Minister of State for the Constitution and Devolution, Chloe Smith, stating that door-to-door campaigning or leafleting by individual political party activists was not possible under the restriction "You must not leave, or be outside of your home except where necessary". Labour suspended leafleting and urged other parties to do the same, but the Liberal Democrats' leader Ed Davey defended the party's leafleting activities, arguing that the party had taken legal advice and that leafleting was allowed under an exemption for volunteer organisations. Rights and democracy groups criticised the restrictions on campaigning, claiming that there was no leafleting ban in the coronavirus regulations and raising concerns it could interfere with the right to free expression and the functioning of democracy.

On 26 February, the UK government said the restrictions in England would be changed to allow door-to-door campaigns from 8 March, and that similar guidance would be published by the Welsh and Scottish governments. Campaigners would be able to deliver leaflets and speak to electors on their doorsteps.

== Campaign ==
Going into the short campaign period, the Conservative Party started to develop a 6–7% poll lead on the Labour Party.

On Thursday 11 March, Labour launched its local election campaign, with the party's leader Keir Starmer, deputy leader Angela Rayner, Mayor of London Sadiq Khan, First Minister of Wales Mark Drakeford, Scottish Labour leader Anas Sarwar and West Yorkshire metro-mayor candidate Tracy Brabin as speakers. The party focused its election priorities on giving nurses a pay rise.

Following the death of Prince Philip, Duke of Edinburgh, political parties halted campaigning for local and devolved elections for a period of mourning of a few days.

== Voters and voting systems ==
In England, all residents of the areas covered who are 18 years or over and are a British or Irish citizen, a qualifying Commonwealth citizen, or a citizen of the European Union were eligible to vote. A resident can be registered to vote in two local authorities, such as a student living away from home, and they may vote in both. In Wales, all residents who are 16 years or over and are registered to vote, regardless of citizenship, will be eligible to vote. The deadline to be registered to vote in the May 2021 elections is 11:59pm on 19 April 2021.

Because this wave of local elections incorporates different positions, voters used different voting systems to elect politicians. Councillors were elected using first-past-the-post, meaning that the candidate with the most votes in a ward was elected. Councils having "all-up" elections had block voting, where voters have a vote for each seat the ward represents and the top candidates are elected. All mayors of England and Police and crime commissioners of England and Wales were elected using the supplementary vote system, where voters select a first and second choice. If no candidate receives 50% of the vote, all except the top two are eliminated. If a voter's first choice candidate is eliminated, and their second choice is for one of the top two, then the second choice is counted.

The Welsh and Scottish parliaments used the additional member system, or AMS. This means voters vote once in a single member constituency and once for party representation in their electoral region. London uses two systems: the Mayor of London is elected using the supplementary vote system while the London Assembly uses AMS.

== Results summary ==
=== Councils ===
Party	Councillors			Councils		
Party	Won	After	+/- (Note: Because the number of council seats shifts every year due to boundary changes and local government reorganisation, changes are notional changes calculated by the BBC.)	Won	After	+/-
Conservative	2,345	7,606	▲235	63	140	▲13
Labour	1,345	5,911	▼327	44	84	▼8
Liberal Democrats	588	2,513	▲8	7	22	▲1
Green	151	461	▲88	0	0	Steady
SNP	—N/a (Note: There were no elections in Scotland in 2021.)	432	Steady	0	0	Steady
Plaid Cymru	—N/a (Note: There were no elections in Wales in 2021.)	207	Steady	0	1	Steady
UKIP	0	8	▼48	0	0	Steady
Independent	308	2,203	▲44	0	11	Steady
No overall control	—N/a			29	127	▼6

Turnout at the local elections was 35.6%.

== England ==
On 13 March 2020, the Government announced that the 2020 elections would be postponed until 2021 in response to growing concerns about the spread of the COVID-19 coronavirus.

=== County councils ===
Click or tap on the map to show the party in control of each council before and after the election
Conservative
No overall control
No election

County councils are elected in full every four years, with the last election having been in 2017. County councils are the upper part of a two-tier system of local government, with the area each covers subdivided into district councils with different responsibilities. These are first-past-the-post elections with a mixture of single-member and multi-member electoral divisions.

There were previously twenty-six county councils, but there will only be twenty-four by the time of the election. Buckinghamshire County Council was replaced with a unitary authority, Buckinghamshire Council, on 1 April 2020. Northamptonshire County Council "declared itself effectively bankrupt" in February 2018 and two new unitary authorities, North Northamptonshire and West Northamptonshire replaced it on 1 April 2021.

In late February 2021 the government confirmed that council elections in Cumbria, North Yorkshire, and Somerset were to be rescheduled for May 2022 because of plans to re-organise the structure of local government in those areas. This meant that council elections for Cumbria County Council, North Yorkshire County Council and Somerset County Council were postponed until the May 2022 local elections.

Council	Seats	Original year	Previous control	Result	Details
Cambridgeshire	61	2021	Conservative	No overall control (LibDem/Lab/Ind coalition)	Details
Derbyshire	64	2021	Conservative	Conservative	Details
Devon	60	2021	Conservative	Conservative	Details
East Sussex	50	2021	Conservative	Conservative	Details
Essex	75	2021	Conservative	Conservative	Details
Gloucestershire	53	2021	Conservative	Conservative	Details
Hampshire	78	2021	Conservative	Conservative	Details
Hertfordshire	78	2021	Conservative	Conservative	Details
Kent	81	2021	Conservative	Conservative	Details
Lancashire	84	2021	Conservative	Conservative	Details
Leicestershire	55	2021	Conservative	Conservative	Details
Lincolnshire	70	2021	Conservative	Conservative	Details
Norfolk	84	2021	Conservative	Conservative	Details
Nottinghamshire	66	2021	No overall control (Con/MIF coalition)	Conservative	Details
Oxfordshire	63	2021	No overall control (Con/Ind coalition)	No overall control (LibDem/Lab/Grn coalition)	Details
Staffordshire	62	2021	Conservative	Conservative	Details
Suffolk	75	2021	Conservative	Conservative	Details
Surrey	81	2021	Conservative	Conservative	Details
Warwickshire	57	2021	Conservative	Conservative	Details
West Sussex	70	2021	Conservative	Conservative	Details
Worcestershire	57	2021	Conservative	Conservative	Details
All 21 councils	1,632				

=== Metropolitan boroughs ===
Click or tap on the map to show the party in control of each council before and after the election
Labour
Conservative
No overall control
No election

There are thirty-six metropolitan boroughs, which are single-tier local authorities. Thirty-three of them elect a third of their councillors every year for three years, with no election in each fourth year. These councils hold their elections on the same timetable, and were due to hold an election in 2020 but not in 2021. However, due to the coronavirus pandemic, the May 2020 elections were postponed to May 2021. The remaining three metropolitan boroughs elect their councillors in full every four years. Rotherham Metropolitan Borough Council was due to hold an election for all councillors in May 2020, but this was postponed to 2021. Doncaster Metropolitan Borough Council was due to elect its councillors in 2021. Birmingham City Council holds its elections on a four-year cycle from 2018, so was not due to hold an election until 2022; there were, however, by-elections in 4 wards.

Due to boundary changes, Salford City Council also elected all of its councillors in 2021, and subsequently returned to the thirds schedule. The remaining thirty-two metropolitan borough councils that elect their councillors in thirds did so as usual at this election.

==== Elections for all councillors ====
Council	Seats	Original year	Previous control	Result	Details
Doncaster	55	2021	Labour	Labour	Details
Rotherham	59	2020	Labour	Labour	Details
Salford	60	2020	Labour	Labour	Details
All three councils	178				

==== Elections for one third of councillors ====
Council	Seats		Original year	Previous control	Result	Details
Council	up	of	Original year	Previous control	Result	Details
Barnsley	21	63	2020	Labour	Labour	Details
Bolton	20	60	2020	No overall control (Con minority, Ind/LibDem/UKIP support)	No overall control (Con minority, Ind/UKIP support)	Details
Bradford	30	90	2020	Labour	Labour	Details
Bury	17	51	2020	Labour	Labour	Details
Calderdale	17	51	2020	Labour	Labour	Details
Coventry	18	54	2020	Labour	Labour	Details
Dudley	24	72	2020	No overall control (Con minority)	Conservative	Details
Gateshead	22	66	2020	Labour	Labour	Details
Kirklees	23	69	2020	No overall control (Lab minority)	No overall control (Lab minority)	Details
Knowsley	15	45	2020	Labour	Labour	Details
Leeds	33	99	2020	Labour	Labour	Details
Liverpool	30	90	2020	Labour	Labour	Details
Manchester	32	96	2020	Labour	Labour	Details
Newcastle upon Tyne	26	78	2020	Labour	Labour	Details
North Tyneside	20	60	2020	Labour	Labour	Details
Oldham	20	60	2020	Labour	Labour	Details
Rochdale	20	60	2020	Labour	Labour	Details
Sandwell	24	72	2020	Labour	Labour	Details
Sefton	22	66	2020	Labour	Labour	Details
Sheffield	28	84	2020	Labour	No overall control (Lab/Green coalition)	Details
Solihull	17	51	2020	Conservative	Conservative	Details
South Tyneside	18	54	2020	Labour	Labour	Details
St Helens	16	48	2020	Labour	Labour	Details
Stockport	21	63	2020	No overall control (Lab minority)	No overall control (Lab minority)	Details
Sunderland	25	75	2020	Labour	Labour	Details
Tameside	19	57	2020	Labour	Labour	Details
Trafford	21	63	2020	Labour	Labour	Details
Wakefield	21	63	2020	Labour	Labour	Details
Walsall	20	60	2020	Conservative	Conservative	Details
Wigan	25	75	2020	Labour	Labour	Details
Wirral	22	66	2020	No overall control (Lab minority)	No overall control (Lab minority)	Details
Wolverhampton	20	60	2020	Labour	Labour	Details
All 32 councils	729	2,187				

=== Unitary authorities ===
Click or tap on the map to show the party in control of each council before and after the election
Labour
Conservative
No overall control
No election

There were previously fifty-five unitary authorities, but three more were created by the May elections. Buckinghamshire County Council was replaced with a unitary authority, Buckinghamshire Council, on 1 April 2020; the first election to the new unitary authority was scheduled for May 2020, but due to the coronavirus pandemic was rescheduled for May 2021. Subsequent elections are due to be held every four years from 2025. Northamptonshire County Council was replaced with two unitary authorities, North Northamptonshire and West Northamptonshire on 1 April 2021. The first elections to the shadow authorities (temporary council structures before the council formally begins) were planned to be held in May 2020, but due to the coronavirus pandemic have been rescheduled to May 2021. Subsequent elections will be held every four years from 2025.

Of the resulting fifty-eight unitary authorities, thirty elect all their councillors every four years on the cycle from 2019, so are not due to hold elections until 2023. Six elect their councillors every four years and were originally planning to elect in 2021. The three new unitary authorities were scheduled to hold their elections in 2020 and then every four years from 2025, before the 2020 local elections were postponed to 2021. Two unitary authorities were scheduled to elect all their councillors in 2020 but these have also been postponed to 2021. Seventeen unitary authorities elect a third of their councillors every year for three years including 2020 but not 2021, and these elections have been postponed to 2021. Two of these, Halton and Hartlepool, have had boundary changes that mean they are electing all of their councillors in 2021.

==== Elections for all councillors ====
Council	Seats	Original year	Previous control	Result	Details
Bristol	70	2020	Labour	No overall control (Labour minority)	Details
Buckinghamshire (Note: New unitary authority)	147	2020	New unitary authority	Conservative	Details
Cornwall	87 (Note: New election boundaries)	2021	No overall control (Lib Dem/independent coalition)	Conservative	Details
County Durham	126	2021	Labour	No overall control (Conservative/Lib Dem/independent coalition)	Details
Halton	54	2020	Labour	Labour	Details
Hartlepool	36	2020	No overall control (Conservative/Independent Union/Veterans and People's Party coalition)	No overall control (Conservative/independent coalition)	Details
Isle of Wight	39	2021	Conservative	No overall control (Independent/Green/Island Independents/Our Island coalition)	Details
North Northamptonshire	78	2020	New unitary authority	Conservative	Details
Northumberland	67	2021	No overall control (Conservative minority)	Conservative	Details
Shropshire	74	2021	Conservative	Conservative	Details
Warrington	58	2020	Labour	Labour	Details
West Northamptonshire	93	2020	New unitary authority	Conservative	Details
Wiltshire	98	2021	Conservative	Conservative	Details
All thirteen councils	986				

==== Elections for one third of councillors ====
Council	Seats		Original year	Previous control	Result	Details
Council	up	of	Original year	Previous control	Result	Details
Blackburn with Darwen	17	51	2020	Labour	Labour	Details
Derby	17	51	2020	No overall control (Conservative minority)	No overall control (Conservative minority)	Details
Hull	19	57	2020	Labour	Labour	Details
Milton Keynes	19	57	2020	No overall control (Labour minority with Lib Dem support)	No overall control (Labour/Lib Dem coalition)	Details
North East Lincolnshire	12	42	2020	Conservative	Conservative	Details
Peterborough	22	60	2020	No overall control (Conservative minority with independent support)	No overall control (Conservative minority with independent support)	Details
Plymouth	19	57	2020	Labour	No overall control (Conservative minority)	Details
Portsmouth	14	42	2020	No overall control (Lib Dem minority)	No overall control (Lib Dem minority with Labour/Progressive Portsmouth People support)	Details
Reading	16	46	2020	Labour	Labour	Details
Slough	14	42	2020	Labour	Labour	Details
Southampton	16	48	2020	Labour	Conservative	Details
Southend	17	51	2020	No overall control (Labour/independent/Lib Dem coalition)	No overall control (Labour/independent/Lib Dem coalition)	Details
Swindon	19	57	2020	Conservative	Conservative	Details
Thurrock	17	49	2020	Conservative	Conservative	Details
Wokingham	18	54	2020	Conservative	Conservative	Details
All fifteen councils	255	764				

=== District councils ===
Click or tap on the map to show the party in control of each council before and after the election
Labour
Conservative
Liberal Democrats
No overall control
No election

62 out of the 182 non-metropolitan district councils held council elections.

==== Whole district councils ====
Seven district councils had all of their seats up for election. The seats for Gloucester and Stroud were last up for election in 2016. Basingstoke and Deane, Cambridge, Chorley, Oxford and Pendle have all seats up for election due to ward boundary changes.

Council	Previous control	Result	Details
Basingstoke and Deane	No overall control (Conservative minority)	Conservative	Details
Cambridge	Labour	Labour	Details
Chorley	Labour	Labour	Details
Gloucester	No overall control (Conservative minority)	Conservative	Details
Oxford	Labour	Labour	Details
Pendle	No overall control (Labour/Lib Dem coalition)	Conservative	Details
Stroud	No overall control (Labour/Green/Lib Dem coalition)	No overall control (Labour/Green/Lib Dem coalition)	Details

==== Half of councils ====
Six councils had half of their seats up for election. These seats were last up for election in 2016, and were due to be contested in 2020.

Council	Previous control	Result	Details
Adur	Conservative	Conservative	Details
Cheltenham	Liberal Democrats	Liberal Democrats	Details
Fareham	Conservative	Conservative	Details
Gosport	Conservative	Conservative	Details
Hastings	Labour	Labour	Details
Nuneaton and Bedworth	No overall control (Labour minority)	Conservative	Details

==== One-third of district councils ====
Forty-six councils had one-third of their seats up for election. These seats were last up for election in 2016, and were due to be contested in 2020. Elections in Craven, Carlisle and South Lakeland have been postponed due to pending local government reorganisation. In July 2021 the government announced that these three district councils will be abolished in April 2023. The postponed elections will therefore not take place, and the councillors elected in 2016 will serve until 2023.

Council	Previous control	Result	Details
Amber Valley	Labour	Conservative	Details
Basildon	No overall control (Labour/independent coalition)	Conservative	Details
Brentwood	Conservative	Conservative	Details
Broxbourne	Conservative	Conservative	Details
Burnley	No overall control (Labour minority)	No overall control (Labour/Lib Dem coalition)	Details
Cannock Chase	No overall control (Labour minority)	Conservative	Details
Castle Point	Conservative	Conservative	Details
Cherwell	Conservative	Conservative	Details
Colchester	No overall control (Labour/Lib Dem coalition)	No overall control (Conservative/independent coalition)	Details
Crawley	No overall control (Labour minority)	No overall control (Labour/independent coalition)	Details
Eastleigh	Liberal Democrats	Liberal Democrats	Details
Elmbridge	No overall control (Lib Dem/Residents Associations coalition)	No overall control (Lib Dem/Residents Association coalition)	Details
Epping Forest	Conservative	Conservative	Details
Exeter	Labour	Labour	Details
Harlow	Labour	Conservative	Details
Hart	No overall control (Lib Dem/Community Campaign coalition)	No overall control (Lib Dem/Community Campaign coalition)	Details
Havant	Conservative	Conservative	Details
Hyndburn	Labour	Labour	Details
Ipswich	Labour	Labour	Details
Lincoln	Labour	Labour	Details
Maidstone	No overall control (Lib Dem/independent coalition)	Conservative	Details
Mole Valley	Liberal Democrats	Liberal Democrats	Details
North Hertfordshire	No overall control (Labour/Lib Dem coalition)	No overall control (Labour/Lib Dem coalition)	Details
Norwich	Labour	Labour	Details
Preston	Labour	Labour	Details
Redditch	Conservative	Conservative	Details
Reigate and Banstead	Conservative	Conservative	Details
Rochford	Conservative	Conservative	Details
Rossendale	Labour	No overall control (Labour minority)	Details
Rugby	Conservative	Conservative	Details
Runnymede	Conservative	Conservative	Details
Rushmoor	Conservative	Conservative	Details
St Albans	No overall control (Lib Dem minority)	Liberal Democrats	Details
Stevenage	Labour	Labour	Details
Tamworth	Conservative	Conservative	Details
Tandridge	No overall control (Conservative minority)	No overall control (Independent/Residents Group minority with Lib Dem support)	Details
Three Rivers	Liberal Democrats	Liberal Democrats	Details
Tunbridge Wells	Conservative	No overall control (Conservative minority)	Details
Watford	Liberal Democrats	Liberal Democrats	Details
Welwyn Hatfield	No overall control (Conservative minority)	Conservative	Details
West Lancashire	Labour	No overall control (Labour minority)	Details
West Oxfordshire	Conservative	Conservative	Details
Winchester	Liberal Democrats	Liberal Democrats	Details
Woking	No overall control (Conservative minority)	No overall control (Conservative minority)	Details
Worcester	No overall control (Conservative/Labour coalition)	Conservative	Details
Worthing	Conservative	Conservative	Details

=== London Assembly ===
The London Assembly consists of twenty-five elected members and acts as a scrutiny panel to the mayor. Members are elected using the additional member system, which elects members using both constituencies and a London-wide electoral region.

=== City of London Corporation ===
The Court of Common Council is the main decision-making body of the City of London Corporation, which governs the City of London. The 100 councillors are elected across twenty-five wards. Elections were due on 18 March 2021, but as a result of the coronavirus pandemic were delayed to March 2022.

=== Council of the Isles of Scilly ===
The Council of the Isles of Scilly is the local government authority for the Isles of Scilly. It has sixteen seats, which in the previous 2017 election were all won by independent candidates.

=== Mayors ===
==== Mayor of London ====
The Mayor of London is normally elected for four years, although due to the rescheduling of the 2020 election, the election in 2021 was for a three-year term. The incumbent mayor Sadiq Khan, won re-election with 40.0% of first preference votes, and 55.2% of second preference votes.

==== Combined authority mayors ====
Seven combined authority mayors were up for election.

Combined authority	Original year	Previous mayor	Elected mayor	Details
Cambridgeshire and Peterborough	2021	James Palmer (Con)	Nik Johnson (Labour Co-op)	Details
Greater Manchester	2020	Andy Burnham (Labour Co-op)	Andy Burnham (Labour Co-op)	Details
Liverpool City Region	2020	Steve Rotheram (Lab)	Steve Rotheram (Lab)	Details
Tees Valley	2020	Ben Houchen (Con)	Ben Houchen (Con)	Details
West Midlands	2020	Andy Street (Con)	Andy Street (Con)	Details
West of England	2021	Tim Bowles (Con)	Dan Norris (Lab)	Details
West Yorkshire	2021	Role established	Tracy Brabin (Labour Co-op)	Details

==== Single authority mayors ====
Five single authority mayors were up for election.

Local authority	Original year	Previous Mayor	Mayor-elect	Details
Bristol	2020	Marvin Rees (Lab)	Marvin Rees (Lab)	Details
Doncaster	2021	Ros Jones (Lab)	Ros Jones (Lab)	Details
Liverpool	2020	Joe Anderson (Note: Joe Anderson stood aside as Mayor in December 2020 after being arrested on suspicion of conspiracy to commit bribery and witness intimidation. He was replaced in an interim capacity by his deputy Wendy Simon, and later announced he would not seek re-election.) (Lab)	Joanne Anderson (Lab)	Details
North Tyneside	2021	Norma Redfearn (Lab)	Norma Redfearn (Lab)	Details
Salford	2020	Paul Dennett (Lab)	Paul Dennett (Lab)	Details

=== Police and crime commissioner elections ===
Thirty-five police and crime commissioners in England were up for election, together with four police, fire and crime commissioners.

== Wales ==
=== Senedd ===
Elections took place to elect all 60 members of the Senedd (Welsh Parliament; Welsh: Senedd Cymru), which changed its name from the National Assembly for Wales in 2020. Voting rights were extended to foreign nationals that live in Wales, and residents aged 16 or over.

=== Police and crime commissioner elections ===
All four police and crime commissioners in Wales were up for election, to represent the four police force areas of Dyfed-Powys, Gwent, North Wales and South Wales.

== Scotland ==
Elections took place to elect all 129 members of the Scottish Parliament.

== UK Parliament by-elections ==
A by-election for Hartlepool was held on the same day as these local elections.

A by-election for Airdrie and Shotts took place a week later on 13 May.

A by-election for Chesham and Amersham took place on 17 June 2021.

A by-election for Batley and Spen took place on 1 July 2021.

A by-election for Old Bexley and Sidcup took place on 2 December 2021.

A by-election for North Shropshire took place on 16 December 2021.

== See also ==
- 2019–2023 structural changes to local government in England
- Absentee voting in the United Kingdom
- Elections in the United Kingdom
- List of political parties in the United Kingdom
- Politics of the United Kingdom
