= 2021 Watford Borough Council election =

2021 UK local government election

Map showing the results of the 2021 Watford Borough Council election

The 2021 Watford Borough Council election took place on 6 May 2021 to elect members of Watford Borough Council in England. This was the same day as other local elections.

== Results summary ==
2021 Watford Borough Council election
Party	This election			Full council			This election		
Party	Seats	Net	Seats %	Other	Total	Total %	Votes	Votes %	+/−
Liberal Democrats	8	Steady	66.7	18	26	72.2	12,103	44.0	-11.2
Labour	4	Steady	33.3	6	10	27.8	7,868	28.6	-0.4
Conservative	0	Steady	0.0	0	0	0.0	7,312	26.6	+12.1
Independent	0	Steady	0.0	0	0	0.0	140	0.5	N/A
TUSC	0	Steady	0.0	0	0	0.0	54	0.2	New
Reform UK	0	Steady	0.0	0	0	0.0	42	0.2	New

== Ward results ==
=== Callowland ===
Callowland
Party	Candidate	Votes	%	±%
Labour	Dennis Watling	934	42.2	+4.7
Liberal Democrats	Joseph Inniss	924	41.8	−11.6
Conservative	Mary Sackett	355	16.0	+6.9
Majority		10	0.4	—
Turnout		2,213	38.2	+2.3
Labour hold		Swing	▲8.2	

=== Central ===
Central
Party	Candidate	Votes	%	±%
Liberal Democrats	Marilyn Devonish	915	44.5	−9.5
Labour	Sophia Demetriou-Jones	680	33.1	−3.9
Conservative	Cole Parker	319	15.5	+6.5
Independent	Dennis Wharton	140	6.8	N/A
Majority		235	11.4	−5.6
Turnout		2,054	30.9	−3.3
Liberal Democrats hold		Swing	▼2.8	

=== Holywell ===
Holywell
Party	Candidate	Votes	%	±%
Labour	Nigel Bell	1,272	62.5	+3.1
Conservative	Ian Fox	436	21.4	+9.6
Liberal Democrats	Simonie Jeffree	274	13.5	−15.4
TUSC	Mark O'Connor	54	2.7	N/A
Majority		836	41.1	+10.6
Turnout		2,036	30.8	+5.2
Labour hold		Swing	▼3.3	

=== Leggatts ===
Leggatts
Party	Candidate	Votes	%	±%
Labour	Richard Smith	819	37.4	−6.2
Liberal Democrats	Shafiq Ahmed	765	34.9	+3.7
Conservative	Anthony Parker	565	25.8	+0.6
TUSC	Derek Foster	40	1.8	N/A
Majority		54	2.5	−9.9
Turnout		2,189	37.9	+3.3
Labour hold		Swing	▼4.9	

=== Meriden ===
Meriden
Party	Candidate	Votes	%	±%
Liberal Democrats	Peter Hannon	690	43.0	−16.6
Conservative	Prashanth Elangovan	519	32.4	+18.8
Labour	Felix Tyszkiewicz	395	24.6	+0.7
Majority		171	10.6	—
Turnout		1,604	28.0	−0.4
Liberal Democrats hold		Swing	▼18.4	

=== Nascot ===
Nascot
Party	Candidate	Votes	%	±%
Liberal Democrats	Mark Watkin	1,275	53.9	−10.6
Liberal Democrats	Tom Osborn	1,179	49.9	−14.6
Conservative	Binita Mehta-Parmar	786	33.2	+11.1
Conservative	Ravi Kura	655	27.7	+5.6
Labour	Sarah Flynn	471	19.9	+6.5
Labour	Edward Tunnah	364	15.4	+2.0
Turnout		—	41.0	+2.9
Liberal Democrats hold				
Liberal Democrats hold				

=== Oxhey ===
Oxhey
Party	Candidate	Votes	%	±%
Liberal Democrats	Karen Clarke-Taylor	1,316	60.1	−8.4
Conservative	Joseph Gornicki	494	22.5	+8.0
Labour	Sue Sleeman	339	15.5	−1.5
Reform UK	Neal Webber	42	1.9	N/A
Majority		822	37.6	−13.9
Turnout		2,191	40.8	+3.8
Liberal Democrats hold		Swing	▼8.2	

=== Park ===
Park
Party	Candidate	Votes	%	±%
Liberal Democrats	Peter Jeffree	1,472	52.8	−9.6
Conservative	Linda Topping	902	32.4	+12.2
Labour	Nabila Ahmed	412	14.8	+2.1
Majority		570	20.4	−22.0
Turnout		2,786	43.4	+1.0
Liberal Democrats hold		Swing	▼10.9	

=== Stanborough ===
Stanborough
Party	Candidate	Votes	%	±%
Liberal Democrats	Simon Feldman	956	49.3	−33.9
Conservative	Peter Williams	673	34.7	N/A
Labour	Nina Mileva	312	16.1	−0.7
Majority		283	14.6	−51.8
Turnout		1,941	34.1	+3.8
Liberal Democrats hold		Swing	▼34.3	

=== Tudor ===
Tudor
Party	Candidate	Votes	%	±%
Liberal Democrats	Darren Walford	938	48.6	−12.4
Conservative	Carly Bishop	576	29.8	+11.8
Labour	Seamus Williams	418	21.6	+0.7
Majority		362	18.8	−21.3
Turnout		1,932	37.0	+4.2
Liberal Democrats hold		Swing	▼12.1	

=== Vicarage ===
Vicarage
Party	Candidate	Votes	%	±%
Labour	Sara Trebar	1,061	48.1	−9.5
Liberal Democrats	Dan Thurlow	592	26.9	−3.2
Conservative	Abbas Merali	551	25.0	+12.7
Majority		469	21.2	−6.3
Turnout		2,204	37.7	+3.4
Labour hold		Swing	▼3.2	

=== Woodside ===
Woodside
Party	Candidate	Votes	%	±%
Liberal Democrats	Ann Saffery	807	48.1	−9.2
Conservative	Amarish Patel	481	28.6	+15.6
Labour	Malcolm Bush	391	23.3	+5.0
Majority		326	19.5	−19.5
Turnout		1,679	29.2	+0.2
Liberal Democrats hold		Swing	▼12.4	
