= 2021 Cherwell District Council election =

2021 UK local government election

Map showing the results of the 2021 Cherwell District Council election

The 2021 Cherwell District Council election was held on 6 May 2021 to elect members of Cherwell District Council in England. This was on the same day as other local elections. The elections were postponed from May 2020 due to the COVID-19 pandemic

== Results summary ==
2021 Cherwell District Council election
| Party | This election | | | Full council | | | This election | | |
| Party | Seats | Net | Seats % | Other | Total | Total % | Votes | Votes % | +/− |
|---|---|---|---|---|---|---|---|---|---|
| Conservative | 11 | ▼1 | 68.8 | 20 | 32 | 66.7 | 20,486 | 47.7 | +4.8 |
| Labour | 3 | Steady | 18.8 | 6 | 9 | 18.8 | 9,779 | 22.8 | +0.3 |
| Liberal Democrats | 1 | ▲1 | 6.3 | 2 | 3 | 6.3 | 6,492 | 15.1 | +1.6 |
| Independent | 1 | Steady | 6.3 | 2 | 3 | 6.3 | 2,005 | 4.7 | -2.6 |
| Green | 0 | Steady | 0.0 | 1 | 1 | 2.1 | 4,149 | 9.7 | -1.7 |
| Reform UK | 0 | Steady | 0.0 | 0 | 0 | 0.0 | 37 | 0.1 | New |

== Ward results ==
=== Adderbury, Bloxham & Bodicote ===
Adderbury, Bloxham & Bodicote
| Party | Candidate | Votes | % | ±% |
|---|---|---|---|---|
| Conservative | Adam Nell | 1,512 | 51.9 | −0.3 |
| Liberal Democrats | David Hingley | 878 | 30.2 | +17.2 |
| Labour Co-op | Blue Watson | 522 | 17.9 | +1.4 |
| Majority | | 634 | 21.7 | −12.2 |
| Turnout | | 2,932 | 39.21 | +6.4 |
| Conservative hold | | Swing | | |

=== Banbury Calthorpe & Easington ===
Banbury Calthorpe & Easington
| Party | Candidate | Votes | % | ±% |
|---|---|---|---|---|
| Conservative | Kieron Mallon | 1,792 | 55.9 | +2.7 |
| Labour Co-op | Alicja Kokot | 754 | 23.5 | −2.3 |
| Green | Julia Middleton | 350 | 10.9 | N/A |
| Liberal Democrats | Ash Haeger | 204 | 6.4 | −14.6 |
| Independent | John Brown | 107 | 3.3 | N/A |
| Majority | | 1,038 | 32.4 | +5.0 |
| Turnout | | 3,250 | 38.66 | +8.0 |
| Conservative hold | | Swing | | |

=== Banbury Cross & Neithrop ===
Banbury Cross & Neithrop
| Party | Candidate | Votes | % | ±% |
|---|---|---|---|---|
| Labour | Matt Hodgson | 1,114 | 45.2 | −3.3 |
| Conservative | Fiaz Ahmed | 941 | 38.2 | +1.1 |
| Green | Linda Ward | 293 | 11.9 | N/A |
| Liberal Democrats | Robert Pattenden | 116 | 4.7 | −9.7 |
| Majority | | 173 | 7.0 | −4.4 |
| Turnout | | 2,495 | 34.04 | +2.3 |
| Labour hold | | Swing | | |

=== Banbury Grimsbury & Hightown ===
Banbury Grimsbury & Hightown
| Party | Candidate | Votes | % | ±% |
|---|---|---|---|---|
| Labour Co-op | Andrew Beere | 1,091 | 48.2 | −1.0 |
| Conservative | David Beverly | 797 | 35.2 | +5.1 |
| Green | Aaron Bliss | 243 | 10.7 | −10.0 |
| Liberal Democrats | David Yeomans | 133 | 5.9 | N/A |
| Majority | | 294 | 13.0 | −6.1 |
| Turnout | | 2,309 | 32.77 | +3.7 |
| Labour Co-op hold | | Swing | | |

=== Banbury Hardwick ===
Banbury Hardwick
| Party | Candidate | Votes | % | ±% |
|---|---|---|---|---|
| Conservative | John Donaldson | 981 | 47.5 | −2.2 |
| Labour | Simon Garrett | 692 | 33.5 | +8.1 |
| Independent | Berenice Westwood | 155 | 7.5 | N/A |
| Green | Christopher Manley | 133 | 6.4 | −6.7 |
| Liberal Democrats | James Hartley | 66 | 3.2 | N/A |
| Reform UK | Stephen Hartley | 37 | 1.8 | N/A |
| Majority | | 289 | 14.0 | −10.3 |
| Turnout | | 2,074 | 29.11 | +2.9 |
| Conservative hold | | Swing | | |

=== Banbury Ruscote ===
Banbury Ruscote
| Party | Candidate | Votes | % | ±% |
|---|---|---|---|---|
| Labour Co-op | Mark Cherry | 947 | 51.6 | −2.3 |
| Conservative | Jayne Strangwood | 676 | 36.9 | +3.7 |
| Green | Carol Broom | 132 | 7.2 | N/A |
| Liberal Democrats | Steve Buckwell | 79 | 4.3 | −8.6 |
| Majority | | 271 | 14.7 | −6.0 |
| Turnout | | 1,849 | 26.69 | +2.9 |
| Labour Co-op hold | | Swing | | |

=== Bicester East ===
Bicester East
| Party | Candidate | Votes | % | ±% |
|---|---|---|---|---|
| Conservative | Sandy Dallimore | 1,134 | 49.0 | +8.9 |
| Green | Peter Maguire | 537 | 23.2 | −10.4 |
| Labour Co-op | Gary Holder | 443 | 19.1 | +0.2 |
| Independent | Antony Peckham | 201 | 8.7 | N/A |
| Majority | | 597 | 25.8 | +19.3 |
| Turnout | | 2,350 | 37.24 | +6.2 |
| Conservative hold | | Swing | | |

=== Bicester North & Caversfield ===
Bicester North & Caversfield
| Party | Candidate | Votes | % | ±% |
|---|---|---|---|---|
| Conservative | Lynn Pratt | 1,108 | 52.7 | +4.8 |
| Labour | Sian Roscoe | 435 | 20.7 | +4.2 |
| Green | Clelia Bevillard | 302 | 14.4 | −3.6 |
| Liberal Democrats | Simon Lytton | 258 | 12.3 | −5.3 |
| Majority | | 573 | 32.0 | +2.1 |
| Turnout | | 2,121 | 32.84 | +5.4 |
| Conservative hold | | Swing | | |

=== Bicester South & Ambrosden ===
Bicester South & Ambrosden
| Party | Candidate | Votes | % | ±% |
|---|---|---|---|---|
| Conservative | Dan Sames | 1,374 | 42.9 | +12.6 |
| Liberal Democrats | Sam Decombel | 1,312 | 41.0 | N/A |
| Labour | Jane Clements | 516 | 16.1 | +2.8 |
| Majority | | 62 | 1.9 | |
| Turnout | | 3,220 | 35.95 | +6.6 |
| Conservative hold | | Swing | | |

=== Bicester West ===
Bicester West
| Party | Candidate | Votes | % | ±% |
|---|---|---|---|---|
| Independent | Les Sibley | 1,542 | 63.2 | +5.7 |
| Conservative | Sundeep Singh | 473 | 19.4 | −7.3 |
| Labour | Celia Kavuma | 317 | 13.0 | −2.8 |
| Liberal Democrats | Chris Pruden | 106 | 4.3 | N/A |
| Majority | | 1,069 | 43.8 | +10.0 |
| Turnout | | 2,464 | 36.85 | +2.4 |
| Independent hold | | Swing | | |

=== Cropredy, Sibfords & Wroxton ===
Cropredy, Sibfords & Wroxton
| Party | Candidate | Votes | % | ±% |
|---|---|---|---|---|
| Conservative | George Reynolds | 1,995 | 65.3 | +6.5 |
| Labour | Anne Cullen | 614 | 20.1 | +4.5 |
| Green | Karl Kwiatkowski | 444 | 14.5 | N/A |
| Majority | | 1,381 | 45.2 | +12.0 |
| Turnout | | 3,082 | 45.75 | +5.0 |
| Conservative hold | | Swing | | |

=== Deddington ===
Deddington
| Party | Candidate | Votes | % | ±% |
|---|---|---|---|---|
| Conservative | Bryn Williams | 1,855 | 57.6 | +7.7 |
| Liberal Democrats | Nigel Davis | 686 | 21.3 | +4.0 |
| Labour | Amanda Watkins | 680 | 21.1 | +7.2 |
| Majority | | 1,169 | 36.3 | +5.4 |
| Turnout | | 3,246 | 43.47 | +5.0 |
| Conservative hold | | Swing | | |

=== Fringford & Heyfords ===
Fringford & Heyfords
| Party | Candidate | Votes | % | ±% |
|---|---|---|---|---|
| Conservative | Patrick Clarke | 1,662 | 60.1 | +4.9 |
| Green | Jenny Tamblyn | 673 | 24.3 | +5.4 |
| Labour | Christopher Howells | 430 | 15.6 | N/A |
| Majority | | 989 | 35.8 | −0.4 |
| Turnout | | 2,790 | 40.28 | +5.4 |
| Conservative hold | | Swing | | |

=== Kidlington East ===
Kidlington East
| Party | Candidate | Votes | % | ±% |
|---|---|---|---|---|
| Conservative | Maurice Billington | 1,524 | 50.5 | +12.8 |
| Green | Fiona Mawson | 1,042 | 34.5 | −5.9 |
| Labour | Catherine Arakelian | 450 | 14.9 | +0.9 |
| Majority | | 482 | 16.0 | |
| Turnout | | 3,047 | 42.53 | +4.3 |
| Conservative hold | | Swing | | |

=== Kidlington West ===
Kidlington West
| Party | Candidate | Votes | % | ±% |
|---|---|---|---|---|
| Liberal Democrats | Dorothy Walker | 1,638 | 50.2 | −0.2 |
| Conservative | Helen Kingsley | 1,255 | 38.5 | +11.0 |
| Labour | Edward Lowe | 369 | 11.3 | −2.3 |
| Majority | | 383 | 11.7 | |
| Turnout | | 3,285 | 46.37 | +5.4 |
| Liberal Democrats gain from Conservative | | Swing | | |

=== Launton & Otmoor ===
Launton & Otmoor
| Party | Candidate | Votes | % | ±% |
|---|---|---|---|---|
| Conservative | Simon Holland | 1,407 | 49.8 | −7.8 |
| Liberal Democrats | Calum Miller | 1,016 | 35.9 | N/A |
| Labour | Joanne Howells | 405 | 14.3 | −28.1 |
| Majority | | 389 | 13.9 | |
| Turnout | | 2,855 | 44.62 | +8.9 |
| Conservative hold | | Swing | | |
