= 2021 Sunderland City Council election =

2021 UK local government election

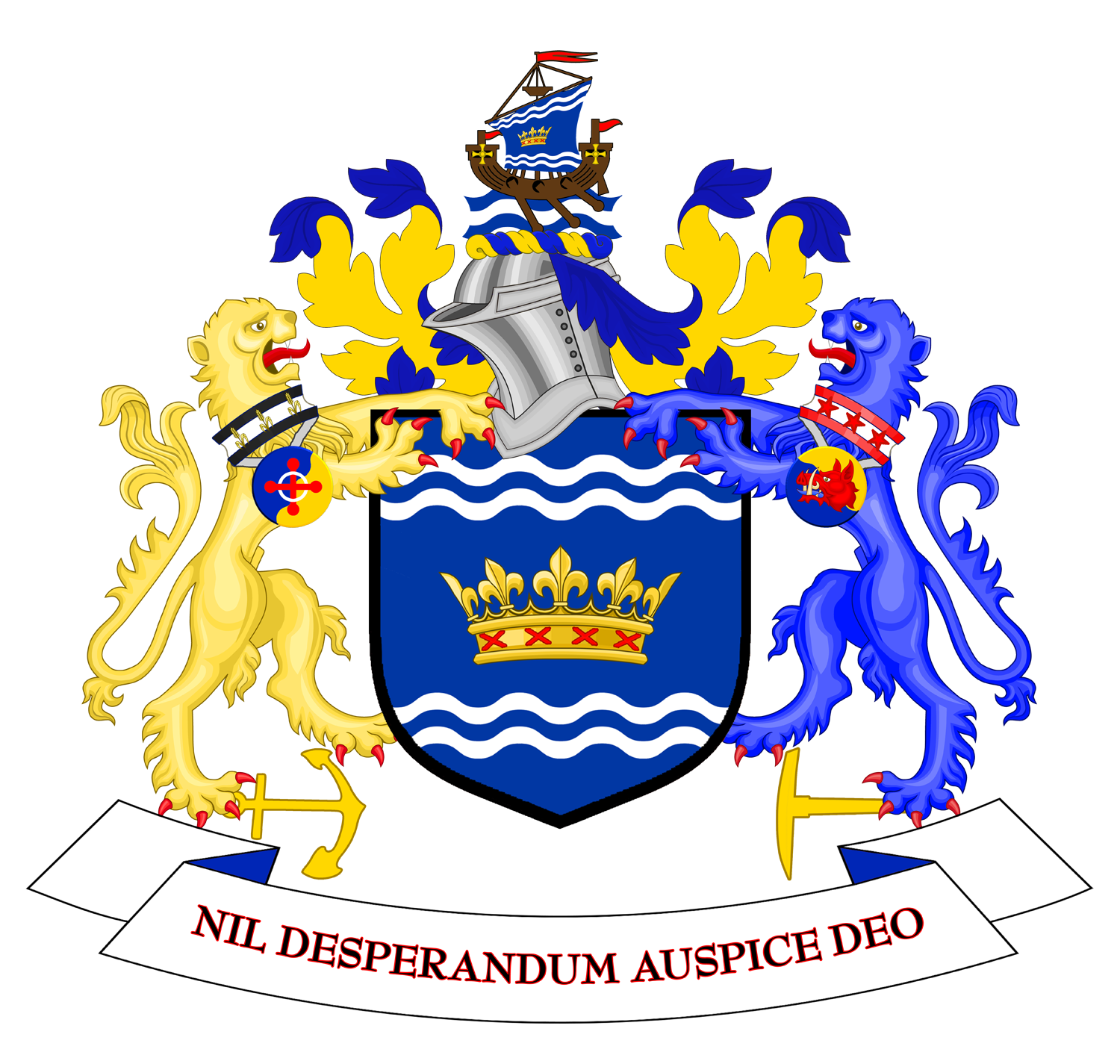
- 7 May 2021

One third of 75 seats on Sunderland City Council, plus three vacancies in Copt Hill, Shiney Row, and Washington South 38 seats needed for a majority
	First party	Second party	Third party
Party	Labour	Conservative	Liberal Democrats
Seats before	51	12	8
Seats won	15	8	5
Seats after	42	18	12
Seat change	▼9	▲6	▲4
	Fourth party	Fifth party
Party	UKIP	Green
Seats before	0	1
Seats won	0	0
Seats after	3	0
Seat change	Steady	▼1
- Map showing the results of the 2021 Sunderland City Council election
Majority party before election
Labour
Majority party after election
Labour

The 2021 Sunderland City Council election took place on 6 May 2021 to elect members of Sunderland City Council in England on the same day as other elections across the United Kingdom.

== Background ==
The local elections held in 2021 were originally scheduled for 7 May 2020, but were postponed due to the coronavirus pandemic, and held on 6 May 2021. There were 28 seats up for election: one-third of the seats on the council, plus three additional vacancies in the Copt Hill, Shiney Row, and Washington South wards.

Vacancies had arisen in the Copt Hill and Houghton Wards ahead of the local elections as the former Labour councillors, Jack Cunningham and Alex Scullion respectively, resigned from the council during 2020. In Shiney Row, there was an additional vacancy due to the death in office of Labour councillor Geoff Walker in January 2021. The vacancy in the Washington South ward arose with the resignation in March 2021 of the council's only sitting Green Party councillor, Dom Armstrong, following disagreements with his party about trans rights issues.

There had been speculation ahead of the election that the Labour Party could lose overall control of Sunderland City Council for the first time in its history. Conservative group leader Antony Mullen said that he was 'prepared to form coalition to kick out Labour.'

The Labour Party and Conservatives fielded 28 candidates in the election. The Liberal Democrats fielded 23 candidates, the Green Party 21 and UKIP 19. In addition, there was one Independent, one Populist Party and one Communist Party candidate.

== Election results ==
After the election, the Labour Party maintained control of the council. Labour's majority was reduced to nine, having lost 9 seats. In Washington South, the Conservatives gained the seat vacated by the Green Party, but the Labour incumbent held on to the other. Labour also lost to the Conservatives in Ryhope and St Anne's - wards that had been won by UKIP in the 2019 local elections. The Conservatives made further gains from Labour in St Peter's, St Chad's and Barnes.

Meanwhile, the Liberal Democrats gained seats with large swings from Labour in Sandhill, Pallion, Doxford and Hendon. Fulwell turned out to be a close contest between the Conservatives and Liberal Democrats - pushing Labour into their only third-place position in the city.

Labour leader Graeme Miller described the results as 'very disappointing', commenting that "the UKIP vote across the city moved to the Conservatives, at the same time they received a 10% bump in their vote because the public are happy with the vaccine rollout, and we’ve lost councillors as a result." There were nonetheless some positives for Labour; with strong performances in some of the towns and villages outside Sunderland, winning a close contest in Silksworth, and holding all four seats in the two-up elections in Copt Hill and Shiney Row wards.

2021 Sunderland City Council election
Party	This election				Full council			This election		
Party	Candidates	Seats	Net	Seats %	Other	Total	Total %	Votes	Votes %	+/−
Labour	{{{candidates}}}	15	▼9	53.6	27	42	56.0	27,904	39.2	+6.5
Conservative	{{{candidates}}}	8	▲6	28.6	10	18	24.0	24,735	34.8	+16.1
Liberal Democrats	{{{candidates}}}	5	▲4	17.9	7	12	16.0	10,958	15.4	+1.7
UKIP	{{{candidates}}}	0	Steady	0.0	3	3	4.0	3,191	4.5	-19.4
Green	{{{candidates}}}	0	▼1	0.0	0	0	0.0	3,727	5.2	-2.8
Independent	{{{candidates}}}	0	Steady	0.0	0	0	0.0	554	0.8	-1.1
Populist	{{{candidates}}}	0	Steady	0.0	0	0	0.0	38	0.1	-0.7
Communist	{{{candidates}}}	0	Steady	0.0	0	0	0.0	32	0.1	New

== Council composition ==
In the last council, the composition of the council was:

↓
51	12	8	3	1
Labour	Conservative	Lib; Dem	UKIP	G

After the election, the composition of the council was:

↓
42	18	12	3
Labour	Conservative	Lib; Dem	UKIP

Lib Dem - Liberal Democrats
G - Greens

== Ward results ==
% Change from 2019

=== Barnes ===
Barnes
Party	Candidate	Votes	%	±%
Conservative	Richard Dunn	1,610	48.3	+12.1
Labour	Rebecca Atkinson	1,367	41.0	+11.0
Liberal Democrats	Tim Ellis	201	6.0	−6.8
Green	Alyson Kordbarlag	158	4.7	−1.9
Majority			7.3	
Conservative gain from Labour		Swing		

=== Castle ===
Castle
Party	Candidate	Votes	%	±%
Labour	Denny Wilson	1,243	58.14	+9.8
Conservative	Gwennyth Gibson	583	27.27	+16.4
UKIP	Tony Clarke	201	9.40	−31.3
Liberal Democrats	Allen Curtis	111	5.19	N/A
Majority		660	30.87	
Labour hold		Swing		

=== Copt Hill ===
Copt Hill
Party	Candidate	Votes	%	±%
Labour	Kevin Johnston	1,327	46.4	+5.3
Labour	Tracy Dodds	1,203	42.1	+1.0
Conservative	George Brown	833	29.1	+16.1
Conservative	Jakub Wypych	519	18.1	+5.1
UKIP	Reg Coulson	403	14.1	−21.1
UKIP	John Defty	384	13.4	−21.8
Liberal Democrats	Sue Stirling	272	9.5	N/A
Green	Esme Featherstone	256	9.0	−1.5
Liberal Democrats	Anthony Usher	83	2.9	N/A
Majority				
Labour hold		Swing		
Labour hold		Swing		

=== Doxford ===
Doxford
Party	Candidate	Votes	%	±%
Liberal Democrats	Paul Gibson	1,510	48.7	+6.0
Labour	Thomas Johnston	797	25.7	+2.4
Conservative	John Wiper	684	22.1	+9.5
Green	Auburn Langley	110	3.5	−1.3
Majority		713	23.0	+3.7
Liberal Democrats gain from Labour		Swing		

=== Fulwell ===
Fulwell
Party	Candidate	Votes	%	±%
Conservative	Michael Hartnack	1,826	42.4	+11.7
Liberal Democrats	Malcolm Bond	1,571	36.5	+16.9
Labour Co-op	Barry Curran	730	16.9	−12.2
Green	Liam Dufferwiel	180	4.2	−2.3
Majority				
Conservative hold		Swing		

=== Hendon ===
Hendon
Party	Candidate	Votes	%	±%
Liberal Democrats	Ciaran Morrissey	1,029	42.2	+36.1
Labour	Michael Mordey	849	34.8	−2.3
Conservative	Simon Ayre	377	15.5	+2.8
Green	Helmut Izaks	110	4.5	−4.1
UKIP	Martin Moore	75	3.1	−23.2
Majority				
Liberal Democrats gain from Labour		Swing		

=== Hetton ===
Hetton
Party	Candidate	Votes	%	±%
Labour	James Blackburn	1,258	44.7	+11.5
Independent	David Geddis	554	19.7	−1.9
Conservative	Patricia Francis	545	19.4	+13.7
UKIP	Richard Elvin	313	11.1	−17.6
Green	Rachel Lowe	81	2.9	−0.8
Liberal Democrats	Ian Ellis	63	2.2	N/A
Majority				
Labour hold		Swing		

=== Houghton ===
Houghton
Party	Candidate	Votes	%	±%
Labour	John Price	1,437	48.0	+7.6
Conservative	Raymond Davison	951	31.7	+21.9
UKIP	Donna Thomas	307	10.2	−24.7
Green	Billy Howells	195	6.5	−1.5
Liberal Democrats	Carlton West	106	3.5	N/A
Majority				
Labour hold		Swing		

=== Millfield ===
Millfield
Party	Candidate	Votes	%	±%
Liberal Democrats	Niall Hodson	1,701	65.8	+5.1
Labour	Iain Kay	609	23.6	+0.4
Conservative	Syed Ali	192	7.4	+3.7
Green	Gary Ogle	50	1.9	−0.7
Communist	Julio Romero Johnson	32	1.2	N/A
Majority				
Liberal Democrats hold		Swing		

=== Pallion ===
Pallion
Party	Candidate	Votes	%	±%
Liberal Democrats	Colin Nicholson	1,440	59.4	−4.3
Labour	Abul Haque	480	19.8	+3.1
Conservative	Judith Porter	410	16.9	+12.8
Green	Danielle Chamberlain	93	3.8	+1.3
Majority				
Liberal Democrats gain from Labour		Swing		

=== Redhill ===
Redhill
Party	Candidate	Votes	%	±%
Labour	Alison Smith	1,019	50.6	+13.0
Conservative	Paul Burke	623	30.9	+16.8
UKIP	Sandra Hesslewood	371	18.4	−22.6
Majority				
Labour hold		Swing		

=== Ryhope ===
Ryhope
Party	Candidate	Votes	%	±%
Conservative	Usman Ali	1,411	49.1	+33.7
Labour	Ellen Ball	1,230	42.8	+9.1
UKIP	Marek Filipkowski	233	8.1	−26.3
Majority		189	6.3	
Conservative gain from Labour		Swing		

=== Sandhill ===
Sandhill
Party	Candidate	Votes	%	±%
Liberal Democrats	Paul Edgeworth	1,274	50.8	+10.7
Labour	Debra Waller	812	32.4	+8.1
Conservative	Christine Reed	320	12.7	+7.2
UKIP	Pauline Huntley	66	2.6	−25.5
Populist	Tony Morrow	38	1.5	−7.9
Majority		462	16.4	
Liberal Democrats gain from Labour		Swing	34	

=== Shiney Row ===
Shiney Row
Party	Candidate	Votes	%	±%
Labour	Katherine Mason-Gage	1,639	50.9	+12.1
Labour	David Snowdon	1,190	36.9	−1.9
Conservative	Grant Shearer	1,069	33.2	+18.0
Conservative	Richard Vardy	1,026	31.8	+16.6
Green	Raymond Moore	223	6.9	−0.3
UKIP	Kay Rowham	197	6.1	−19.8
Green	Robert Welsh	176	5.5	−1.7
Liberal Democrats	Nana Boddy	170	5.3	−0.4
Majority				
Labour hold		Swing		
Labour hold		Swing		

=== Silksworth ===
Silksworth
Party	Candidate	Votes	%	±%
Labour	Pat Smith	1,120	42.6	+5.1
Conservative	Jack Simm	1,073	40.8	+21.1
Green	Chris Crozier	180	6.8	−2.8
Liberal Democrats	Sharon Boddy	136	5.2	N/A
UKIP	Ian Walton	123	4.7	−23.4
Majority				
Labour hold		Swing		

=== Southwick ===
Southwick
Party	Candidate	Votes	%	±%
Labour	Kelly Chequer	1,208	50.8	+11.5
Conservative	Liam Ritchie	754	31.7	+18.2
UKIP	Stephen Harrison	171	7.2	−14.9
Liberal Democrats	Norman Dent	138	5.8	+0.6
Green	Morgan Seed	105	4.4	−1.3
Majority			19.1	
Labour hold		Swing		

=== St Anne's ===
St Anne's
Party	Candidate	Votes	%	±%
Conservative	Greg Peacock	911	42.0	+25.3
Labour	Susan Watson	908	41.9	+9.1
UKIP	Bryan Foster	190	8.8	−25.8
Liberal Democrats	Peter Walton	158	7.3	−1.7
Majority		3		
Conservative gain from Labour		Swing		

=== St Chad's ===
St Chad's
Party	Candidate	Votes	%	±%
Conservative	Chris Burnicle	1,647	59.9	+20.2
Labour	Darryl Dixon	895	32.5	+4.6
Liberal Democrats	Elizabeth Crosby	208	7.6	+3.6
Majority				
Conservative gain from Labour		Swing		

=== St Michael's ===
St Michael's
Party	Candidate	Votes	%	±%
Conservative	Lyall Reed	1,958	57.1	+6.4
Labour	Chris Smith	902	26.3	+5.2
Green	John Appleton	455	13.3	+3.0
Liberal Democrats	Colin Wilson	117	3.4	−2.1
Majority		1,056		
Conservative hold		Swing		

=== St Peter's ===
St Peter's
Party	Candidate	Votes	%	±%
Conservative	Sam Johnston	1,808	53.8	+18.9
Labour	David Newey	1,056	31.4	+5.2
Green	Rachel Featherstone	216	6.4	−3.5
Liberal Democrats	John Lennox	183	5.4	−5.1
UKIP	Ian Lines	95	2.8	−15.4
Majority				
Conservative gain from Labour		Swing		

=== Washington Central ===
Washington Central
Party	Candidate	Votes	%	±%
Labour	Dianne Snowdon	1,611	55.1	+13.8
Conservative	Michael Winter	915	31.3	+13.1
Green	Scott Burrows	211	7.2	−2.1
UKIP	Tony Ormond	107	3.7	−21.7
Liberal Democrats	Sean Terry	82	2.8	−3.1
Majority				
Labour hold		Swing		

=== Washington East ===
Washington East
Party	Candidate	Votes	%	±%
Labour	Sean Laws	1,558	47.9	+10.3
Conservative	Hilary Johnson	1,403	43.1	+19.1
Green	Michal Chantkowski	193	5.9	−6.1
UKIP	Stephen Cuthbert	98	3.0	−16.4
Majority				
Labour hold		Swing		

=== Washington North ===
Washington North
Party	Candidate	Votes	%	±%
Labour	Michael Walker	1,216	52.8	+10.1
Conservative	Derek Dunn	730	31.7	+19.5
Green	Graeme Edminson	148	6.4	−5.3
Liberal Democrats	Jaye Jordan	119	5.2	+1.6
UKIP	Maureen Hibbert	89	3.9	−25.9
Majority				
Labour hold		Swing		

=== Washington South ===
Washington South
Party	Candidate	Votes	%	±%
Conservative	Paul Donaghy	1,186	40.4	+21.1
Labour	Louise Farthing	1,171	39.9	+15.2
Labour	Brandon Feeley	931	31.7	+7.0
Conservative	Craig Morrison	801	27.3	+8.0
Green	Michael Ellis	521	17.8	−7.0
Green	Richard Bradley	418	14.2	−10.6
Liberal Democrats	Steven Donkin	240	8.2	−3.9
UKIP	Josh Green	88	3.0	−15.7
Majority				
Conservative gain from Green		Swing		
Labour hold		Swing		

*Cllr Paul Donaghy defected to Reform UK on 16 January 2023.

=== Washington West ===
Washington West
Party	Candidate	Votes	%	±%
Labour	Jimmy Warne	1,462	52.0	+9.4
Conservative	Olwyn Bird	916	32.6	+17.4
Green	Paul Leonard	242	8.6	−5.4
Liberal Democrats	Andrew Bex	129	4.6	−0.4
UKIP	Bill Little	64	2.3	−21.0
Majority				
Labour hold		Swing		

== By-elections ==
=== Hetton ===
Hetton: 30 September 2021
Party	Candidate	Votes	%	±%
Labour	Iain Scott	661	31.6	−13.1
Liberal Democrats	John Lennox	634	30.3	+28.1
Independent	David Geddis	386	18.5	−1.2
Conservative	Adelle Burnicle	303	14.5	−4.9
Independent	Maurice Allen	67	3.2	N/A
Green	Justine Merton-Scott	41	2.0	−0.9
Majority		27	1.3	
Turnout		2,092	22.5	
Labour hold		Swing	▼20.6	

=== Redhill ===
Redhill: 3 March 2022
Party	Candidate	Votes	%	±%
Labour	John Usher	709	50.2	▼0.4
Liberal Democrats	Steve Donkin	386	27.3	▲27.3 New
Conservative	Sue Leishman	196	13.9	▼17.0
UKIP	Ian Lines	85	6.0	▼12.4
Green	Helmut Izaks	35	2.5	New
Labour gain from UKIP		Swing	▼13.9	
