= 2021 Slough Borough Council election =

2021 UK local government election

- 6 May 2021

14 seats to Slough Borough Council 22 seats needed for a majority

Map showing the results of the 2021 Slough Borough Council election

The 2021 Slough Borough Council election took place on 6 May 2021 to elect members of Slough Borough Council in England. This was on the same day as other local elections.

== Results summary ==
2021 Slough Borough Council election
| Party | This election | | | | Full council | | | This election | | |
| Party | Candidates | Seats | Net | Seats % | Other | Total | Total % | Votes | Votes % | +/− |
|---|---|---|---|---|---|---|---|---|---|---|
| Labour | {{{candidates}}} | 11 | ▼1 | 78.6 | 23 | 34 | 81.0 | 17,227 | 57.6 | -1.4 |
| Conservative | {{{candidates}}} | 2 | Steady | 14.3 | 3 | 5 | 11.9 | 9,072 | 30.3 | +1.9 |
| Independent | {{{candidates}}} | 1 | ▲1 | 7.1 | 2 | 3 | 7.1 | 1,987 | 6.6 | +0.4 |
| Liberal Democrats | {{{candidates}}} | 0 | Steady | 0.0 | 0 | 0 | 0.0 | 939 | 3.1 | -0.6 |
| Green | {{{candidates}}} | 0 | Steady | 0.0 | 0 | 0 | 0.0 | 635 | 2.1 | +0.3 |
| Heritage | {{{candidates}}} | 0 | Steady | 0.0 | 0 | 0 | 0.0 | 66 | 0.2 | New |

== Ward results ==
=== Baylis and Stoke ===
Baylis and Stoke
| Party | Candidate | Votes | % | ±% |
|---|---|---|---|---|
| Labour | Kamaljit Kaur | 1,957 | 83.2 | −2.2 |
| Conservative | Mherunisa Hussain | 395 | 16.8 | +2.2 |
| Majority | | 1,562 | 66.4 | |
| Turnout | | 2,352 | 35.2 | |
| Labour hold | | Swing | ▼2.2 | |

=== Britwell and Northborough ===
Britwell and Northborough
| Party | Candidate | Votes | % | ±% |
|---|---|---|---|---|
| Labour Co-op | Martin Carter | 1,241 | 66.9 | +5.1 |
| Conservative | Chandni Rajora | 466 | 25.1 | +8.1 |
| Green | Byron de Winter | 147 | 7.9 | N/A |
| Majority | | 775 | 41.8 | |
| Turnout | | 1,854 | 26.0 | |
| Labour Co-op hold | | Swing | ▼1.5 | |

=== Central ===
Central
| Party | Candidate | Votes | % | ±% |
|---|---|---|---|---|
| Labour | Iram Hussain | 1,560 | 72.8 | −1.0 |
| Conservative | Beata Prokop | 583 | 27.1 | +1.0 |
| Majority | | 977 | 45.7 | |
| Turnout | | 2,143 | 25.8 | |
| Labour hold | | Swing | ▼1.0 | |

=== Chalvey ===
Chalvey
| Party | Candidate | Votes | % | ±% |
|---|---|---|---|---|
| Labour Co-op | Mohammed Sandhu | 1,225 | 73.2 | −6.6 |
| Conservative | Aaron Brown | 448 | 26.8 | +6.6 |
| Majority | | 777 | 46.4 | |
| Turnout | | 1,673 | 23.4 | |
| Labour Co-op hold | | Swing | ▼6.6 | |

=== Cippenham Green ===
Cippenham Green
| Party | Candidate | Votes | % | ±% |
|---|---|---|---|---|
| Labour | Jemma Davis | 1,272 | 55.2 | +4.7 |
| Conservative | Patricia O'Connor | 967 | 42.0 | +3.7 |
| Heritage | Nick Smith | 66 | 2.9 | N/A |
| Majority | | 305 | 13.2 | |
| Turnout | | 2,305 | 32.4 | |
| Labour hold | | Swing | ▲0.5 | |

=== Cippenham Meadows ===
Cippenham Meadows
| Party | Candidate | Votes | % | ±% |
|---|---|---|---|---|
| Labour Co-op | Satpal Parmar | 1,229 | 55.5 | −1.4 |
| Conservative | Charlie Olsen | 639 | 28.8 | +7.8 |
| Liberal Democrats | Matthew Taylor | 348 | 15.7 | −6.4 |
| Majority | | 590 | 26.7 | |
| Turnout | | 2,216 | 28.0 | |
| Labour hold | | Swing | ▼4.6 | |

=== Elliman ===
Elliman
| Party | Candidate | Votes | % | ±% |
|---|---|---|---|---|
| Labour | Naveeda Qaseem | 1,305 | 77.0 | −1.8 |
| Conservative | Teresa Fletcher | 390 | 23.0 | +1.8 |
| Majority | | 915 | 54.0 | |
| Turnout | | 1,695 | 26.6 | |
| Labour hold | | Swing | ▼1.8 | |

=== Farnham ===
Farnham
| Party | Candidate | Votes | % | ±% |
|---|---|---|---|---|
| Labour | Joginder Bal | 1,481 | 71.0 | +3.5 |
| Conservative | Rafal Trybek | 361 | 17.3 | −8.8 |
| Independent | Indey Kaur | 244 | 11.7 | N/A |
| Majority | | 1,120 | 53.7 | |
| Turnout | | 2,086 | 29.8 | |
| Labour hold | | Swing | ▲6.2 | |

=== Foxborough ===
Foxborough
| Party | Candidate | Votes | % | ±% |
|---|---|---|---|---|
| Independent | Madhuri Bedi | 698 | 63.6 | N/A |
| Labour | Andrea Escott | 281 | 25.6 | −41.3 |
| Conservative | Puja Bedi | 119 | 10.8 | −5.3 |
| Majority | | 417 | 38.0 | |
| Turnout | | 1,098 | 42.5 | |
| Independent gain from Labour | | Swing | ▲52.5 | |

=== Haymill and Lynch Hill ===
Haymill and Lynch Hill
| Party | Candidate | Votes | % | ±% |
|---|---|---|---|---|
| Conservative | Wayne Strutton | 1,154 | 55.8 | +5.4 |
| Labour Co-op | Kevin Barry | 915 | 44.2 | +10.5 |
| Majority | | 239 | 11.6 | |
| Turnout | | 2,069 | 29.1 | |
| Conservative hold | | Swing | ▼2.6 | |

=== Langley Kedermister ===
Langley Kedermister
| Party | Candidate | Votes | % | ±% |
|---|---|---|---|---|
| Conservative | Chandra Muvvala | 1,111 | 43.6 | +8.6 |
| Labour | Michael Holledge | 1,074 | 42.1 | −3.7 |
| Liberal Democrats | Josephine Hanney | 216 | 8.5 | +1.7 |
| Green | Tammer Salem | 79 | 3.1 | N/A |
| Independent | Mohammed Rizvan | 69 | 2.7 | N/A |
| Majority | | 37 | 1.5 | |
| Turnout | | 2,549 | 34.7 | |
| Conservative gain from Labour | | Swing | ▲6.2 | |

=== Langley St. Mary's ===
Langley St. Mary's
| Party | Candidate | Votes | % | ±% |
|---|---|---|---|---|
| Labour | Bally Gill | 1,174 | 45.8 | −2.4 |
| Conservative | Christine Bamigbola | 1,131 | 44.1 | +6.6 |
| Green | Julian Edmonds | 261 | 10.2 | −4.0 |
| Majority | | 43 | 1.7 | |
| Turnout | | 2,566 | 34.1 | |
| Labour hold | | Swing | ▼4.5 | |

=== Upton ===
Upton
| Party | Candidate | Votes | % | ±% |
|---|---|---|---|---|
| Labour | Gurdeep Grewal | 1,440 | 50.3 | +3.2 |
| Conservative | Amandeep Grewal | 899 | 31.4 | −7.0 |
| Liberal Democrats | Sukh Dhillon | 375 | 13.1 | +6.6 |
| Green | Michelle Little | 148 | 5.2 | −2.9 |
| Majority | | 541 | 18.9 | |
| Turnout | | 2,862 | 39.9 | |
| Labour gain from Conservative | | Swing | ▲5.1 | |

=== Wexham Lea ===
Wexham Lea
| Party | Candidate | Votes | % | ±% |
|---|---|---|---|---|
| Labour Co-op | Sandra Malik | 1,073 | 43.7 | −10.9 |
| Independent | Iftakhar Ahmed | 975 | 39.7 | N/A |
| Conservative | Jagjit Dusanjh | 409 | 16.6 | +8.5 |
| Majority | | 98 | 4.0 | |
| Turnout | | 2,457 | 34.7 | |
| Labour Co-op hold | | Swing | ▼25.3 | |
