= 2021 Rochford District Council election =

2021 UK local government election

Map showing the results of the 2021 Rochford District Council election

The 2021 Rochford District Council election took place on 6 May 2021 to elect members of Rochford District Council in England. This was on the same day as other local elections.

== Results summary ==
2021 Rochford District Council election
Party	This election			Full council			This election		
Party	Seats	Net	Seats %	Other	Total	Total %	Votes	Votes %	+/−
Conservative	9	▲2	60.0	18	27	69.2	11,090	42.9	+4.7
Rochford Resident	4	▲1	26.7	2	6	15.4	7,271	28.1	+10.0
Liberal Democrats	1	Steady	6.7	2	3	7.7	2,931	11.3	-1.8
Independent	1	Steady	6.7	1	2	5.1	1,577	6.1	-0.3
Green	0	▼2	0.0	1	1	2.6	109	0.4	-9.0
Labour	0	Steady	0.0	0	0	0.0	2,870	11.1	-0.2
UKIP	0	▼1	0.0	0	0	0.0	N/A	N/A	N/A

== Ward results ==
=== Downhall & Rawreth ===
Downhall & Rawreth
Party	Candidate	Votes	%	±%
Liberal Democrats	Craig Cannell	1,064	61.9	−8.1
Conservative	Patricia Weaver	504	29.3	+7.5
Labour	Shaun Cain	150	8.7	+0.5
Majority		560	32.6	
Turnout		1,718	33.7	
Liberal Democrats hold		Swing		

=== Foulness & The Wakerings ===
Foulness & The Wakerings
Party	Candidate	Votes	%	±%
Conservative	Gary Myers	1,055	67.5	+67.5
Labour	Josh Winiberg	320	20.5	N/A
Green	Carole Shorney	109	7.0	N/A
Liberal Democrats	James Allen	80	5.1	N/A
Majority		735	47.0	
Turnout		1,564	28.3	
Conservative gain from UKIP		Swing		

=== Hawkwell East ===
Hawkwell East
Party	Candidate	Votes	%	±%
Conservative	Lesley Butcher	734	45.6	−1.8
Rochford Resident	Stephen Hinde	697	43.3	+3.8
Labour	Danny Rowton	178	11.1	−2.0
Majority		37	3.3	
Turnout		1,609	33.5	
Conservative hold		Swing		

=== Hawkwell West ===
Hawkwell West
Party	Candidate	Votes	%	±%
Rochford Resident	Christine Mason	898	49.9	−2.7
Conservative	Jim Hall	765	42.5	+2.6
Labour	Jennifer Lewis	135	7.5	+0.0
Majority		133	7.4	
Turnout		1,798	35.4	
Rochford Resident hold		Swing		

=== Hockley ===
Hockley
Party	Candidate	Votes	%	±%
Conservative	Eileen Gadsdon	854	45.8	+16.5
Rochford Resident	John Mason	828	44.4	−8.6
Labour	Ian Rooke	183	9.8	+1.2
Majority		26	1.4	
Turnout		1,865	36.3	
Conservative gain from Rochford Resident		Swing		

=== Hockley & Ashingdon ===
Hockley & Ashingdon
Party	Candidate	Votes	%	±%
Conservative	Roger Constable	826	52.5	+14.5
Conservative	Carole Weston	819	52.1	+14.1
Rochford Resident	Elliot Mason	616	39.2	N/A
Independent	David Catchpole	456	29.0	+3.7
Labour	David Lench	169	10.8	+3.4
Liberal Democrats	Roger Gardner	131	8.3	−14.4
Labour	Vicky Williams	127	8.1	+0.7
Turnout		—	34.6	
Conservative hold				
Conservative hold				

=== Hullbridge ===
Hullbridge
Party	Candidate	Votes	%	±%
Rochford Resident	Michael Hoy	1,448	79.4	N/A
Rochford Resident	Tracey Knight	788	43.2	N/A
Conservative	Angelina Marriott	566	31.0	+11.8
Conservative	Brian Marsden-Carleton	510	28.0	+8.8
Labour	Conner Agius	225	12.3	+7.7
Labour	David Bodimeade	110	6.0	+1.4
Turnout		—	38.1	
Rochford Resident gain from Green				
Rochford Resident gain from Green				

=== Lodge ===
Lodge
Party	Candidate	Votes	%	±%
Conservative	Robert Milne	826	44.4	−2.2
Rochford Resident	Richard Lambourne	805	43.3	−0.7
Labour	Ian Corbett	228	12.3	+2.9
Majority		21	1.1	
Turnout		1,859	35.4	
Conservative hold		Swing		

=== Roche North & Rural ===
Roche North & Rural
Party	Candidate	Votes	%	±%
Conservative	Ian Foster	677	45.5	+6.8
Independent	George Ioannou	474	31.8	N/A
Labour	David Flack	241	16.2	−10.3
Liberal Democrats	Daniel Irlam	97	6.5	N/A
Majority		203	13.7	
Turnout		1,489	29.3	
Conservative hold		Swing		

=== Roche South ===
Roche South
Party	Candidate	Votes	%	±%
Conservative	James Gooding	640	47.2	+7.6
Rochford Resident	Phil Capon	420	31.0	N/A
Labour	Naomi Khan	221	16.3	−7.5
Liberal Democrats	Derek Brown	75	5.5	−6.4
Majority		220	16.2	
Turnout		1,356	28.7	
Conservative hold		Swing		

=== Sweyne Park & Grange ===
Sweyne Park & Grange
Party	Candidate	Votes	%	±%
Rochford Resident	Lisa Newport	771	46.6	+8.7
Conservative	Danielle Belton	696	42.1	−7.3
Labour	James Hedges	186	11.3	−1.4
Majority		75	4.5	
Turnout		1,653	32.8	
Rochford Resident hold		Swing		

=== Trinity ===
Trinity
Party	Candidate	Votes	%	±%
Conservative	David Sperring	992	45.1	−6.6
Liberal Democrats	Marco Quintana Santana	967	44.0	+20.7
Labour	Steve Cooper	241	11.0	+2.7
Majority		25	1.1	
Turnout		2,200	40.4	
Conservative hold		Swing		

=== Wheatley ===
Wheatley
Party	Candidate	Votes	%	±%
Independent	Jack Lawmon	647	33.2	N/A
Conservative	Richard Linden	626	32.2	−6.6
Liberal Democrats	Stephen Tellis	517	26.6	N/A
Labour	Craig Archer	156	8.0	−5.4
Majority		21	1.0	
Turnout		1,946	38.5	
Independent gain from Independent		Swing		

== By-elections ==
=== Downhall & Rawreth ===
Downhall & Rawreth: 3 March 2022
Party	Candidate	Votes	%	±%
Liberal Democrats	Jim Cripps	791	71.5	
Conservative	Danielle Belton	265	23.9	
Labour	Lorraine Ridley	51	4.6	
Majority		526	47.6	
Turnout		1,111	21.4	
Registered electors		5,192		
Liberal Democrats hold		Swing		
