= 2021 Rugby Borough Council election =

UK local election

Map showing the results of the 2021 Rugby Borough Council election

The 2021 Rugby Borough Council election took place on 6 May 2021 to elect members of Rugby Borough Council in England. This was on the same day as other local elections.

== Results summary ==
2021 Rugby Borough Council election
Party	This election			Full council			This election		
Party	Seats	Net	Seats %	Other	Total	Total %	Votes	Votes %	+/−
Conservative	10	▲2	66.7	15	25	59.5	15,027	48.6	+7.3
Liberal Democrats	3	Steady	20.0	6	9	21.4	4,888	15.8	-7.0
Labour	2	▼1	13.3	6	8	19.0	8,414	27.2	+0.8
Green	0	Steady	0.0	0	0	0.0	2,559	8.3	+1.7
Libertarian	0	Steady	0.0	0	0	0.0	42	0.1	New
Independent	0	▼1	0.0	0	0	0.0	0	0.0	New

== Ward results ==
=== Admirals and Cawston ===
Admirals and Cawston
Party	Candidate	Votes	%
Conservative	Carolyn Watson-Merret	1,181	52.0
Conservative	Mark Williams	1,166	51.3
Labour	Michael Moran	774	34.1
Labour	Jon Vickers	650	28.6
Liberal Democrats	Lee Chase	373	16.4
Green	Jenny Farley	206	9.1
Liberal Democrats	Abi Sawyer	194	8.5
Turnout		N/A	35.0
Conservative hold			
Conservative hold			

=== Benn ===
Benn
Party	Candidate	Votes	%	±%
Labour	Maggie O'Rourke	888	52.5	+5.6
Conservative	Rachel Lowe	461	27.3	+9.4
Green	Becca Stevenson	219	13.0	−1.8
Liberal Democrats	Hugh Trimble	122	7.2	−4.3
Majority		427	25.2	
Turnout		1,690	28.5	
Labour hold		Swing	▼1.9	

=== Bilton ===
Bilton
Party	Candidate	Votes	%	±%
Conservative	Julie A'Barrow	1,256	54.2	+0.9
Liberal Democrats	Lesley Kennedy-George	499	21.5	−0.4
Labour	Phil Bates	401	17.3	−7.5
Green	Richard Brook	160	6.9	N/A
Majority		757	32.7	
Turnout		2,316	46.0	
Conservative hold		Swing	▲0.7	

=== Clifton, Newton and Churchover ===
Clifton, Newton and Churchover
Party	Candidate	Votes	%	±%
Conservative	Eve Hassell	539	58.3	−10.9
Labour	Richard Harrington	232	25.1	+4.4
Green	Mark Summers	80	8.6	N/A
Liberal Democrats	Patricia Trimble	74	8.0	−2.1
Majority		307	33.2	
Turnout		925	41.1	
Conservative hold		Swing	▼7.7	

=== Coton and Boughton ===
Coton and Boughton
Party	Candidate	Votes	%	±%
Conservative	Carolyn Robbins	1,034	50.0	+9.7
Labour	Alson Livesey	697	33.7	+3.8
Liberal Democrats	Edward Blackburn	150	7.3	−2.1
Green	Carrie Pailthorpe	143	6.9	−1.4
Libertarian	Jamie Pullin	42	2.0	N/A
Majority		337	16.3	
Turnout		2,066	36.4	
Conservative hold		Swing	▲3.0	

=== Dunsmore ===
Dunsmore
Party	Candidate	Votes	%	±%
Conservative	Howard Roberts	1,888	67.9	+4.6
Labour	Bob Hughes	552	19.9	+5.1
Green	Roy Sandison	339	12.2	N/A
Majority		1,336	48.0	
Turnout		2,779	43.1	
Conservative hold		Swing	▼0.3	

=== Eastlands ===
Eastlands
Party	Candidate	Votes	%	±%
Liberal Democrats	Sue Roodhouse	872	42.4	−5.2
Conservative	Teri Watts	571	27.7	+11.7
Labour	Sal Molina	448	21.8	+1.6
Green	Angie Dunne	167	8.1	+1.9
Majority		301	14.7	
Turnout		2,058	35.3	
Liberal Democrats hold		Swing	▼8.5	

=== Hillmorton ===
Hillmorton
Party	Candidate	Votes	%	±%
Conservative	Adam Daly	1,134	59.3	+8.9
Labour	Sean Baulk	501	26.2	−2.2
Liberal Democrats	Julie Douglas	171	8.9	−2.5
Green	Nick Feledziak	107	5.6	−4.2
Majority		633	33.1	
Turnout		1,913	36.3	
Conservative hold		Swing	▲4.6	

=== New Bilton ===
New Bilton
Party	Candidate	Votes	%	±%
Labour	Ish Mistry	782	51.9	+9.7
Conservative	Gareth Jones	532	35.3	+11.5
Green	Maralyn Pickup	194	12.9	+3.0
Majority		250	16.6	
Turnout		1,508	27.5	
Labour hold		Swing	▼0.9	

=== Newbold and Brownsover ===
Newbold and Brownsover
Party	Candidate	Votes	%	±%
Conservative	Wayne Rabin	838	48.4	+13.0
Labour	Kieren Brown	780	45.0	+2.8
Liberal Democrats	Hossain Tafazzal	114	6.6	+0.4
Majority		58	3.4	
Turnout		1,732	27.3	
Conservative gain from Labour		Swing	▲5.1	

=== Paddox ===
Paddox
Party	Candidate	Votes	%	±%
Liberal Democrats	Tim Douglas	1,114	45.1	−12.6
Conservative	Ann Jones	812	32.9	+12.8
Labour	Chris Mawby	401	16.2	+0.7
Green	Bob Beggs	141	5.7	−1.1
Majority		302	12.2	
Turnout		2,468	44.1	
Liberal Democrats hold		Swing	▼12.7	

=== Revel and Binley Woods ===
Revel and Binley Woods
Party	Candidate	Votes	%	±%
Conservative	Tony Gillias	1,632	69.5	−3.8
Labour	Sarah Feeney	471	20.1	−6.6
Green	Stephen Ward	245	10.4	N/A
Majority		1,161	49.4	
Turnout		2,348	45.4	
Conservative hold		Swing	▲1.4	

=== Rokeby and Overslade ===
Rokeby and Overslade
Party	Candidate	Votes	%	±%
Liberal Democrats	Carie-Anne Dumbleton	1,205	50.1	−13.1
Conservative	Toby Lawrence	707	29.4	+11.0
Labour	Mark Gore	360	15.0	−3.5
Green	Kate Crowley	133	5.5	N/A
Majority		498	20.7	
Turnout		2,405	40.6	
Liberal Democrats hold		Swing	▼12.1	

=== Wolston and The Lawfords ===
Wolston and The Lawfords
Party	Candidate	Votes	%	±%
Conservative	Tim Willis	1,276	58.6	+4.2
Labour	Audrey Rooney-Ellis	477	21.9	+0.3
Green	Lesley Summers	425	19.5	−4.6
Majority		799	36.7	
Turnout		2,178	36.0	
Conservative hold		Swing	▲2.0	

== By-elections ==
=== Wolvey and Shilton ===
Wolvey and Shilton: 24 June 2021
Party	Candidate	Votes	%	±%
Conservative	Becky Maoudis	370	76.6	
Labour	Richard Harrington	60	12.4	
Liberal Democrats	Sam Edwards	29	6.0	
Green	Mark Summers	24	5.0	
Majority		310	64.2	
Turnout		483		
Conservative hold		Swing		
