= 2021 Rotherham Metropolitan Borough Council election =

Local election in England

- 6 May 2021

All 59 seats up for election to Rotherham Metropolitan Council 30 seats needed for a majority
- Turnout: 30.1%

| | First party | Second party | Third party |
|---|---|---|---|
| Party | Labour | Conservative | Rotherham Democratic Party |
| Seats won | 32 | 20 | 3 |
| Seat change | ▼16 | ▲20 | ▲3 |
| Popular vote | 50,681 | 34,833 | 14,659 |
| Percentage | 41.4% | 28.4% | 12.0% |
| Swing | ▼9.6% | ▲20.5% | New |
| | Fourth party | Fifth party |
| Party | Liberal Democrats | Independent |
| Seats won | 3 | 1 |
| Seat change | ▲3 | Steady |
| Popular vote | 9,636 | 6,326 |
| Percentage | 7.9% | 5.2% |
| Swing | ▲6.5% | Steady |
- Map of the results
Council control before election
Labour
Council control after election
Labour

Elections to Rotherham Metropolitan Borough Council were held on 6 May 2021.

Although Labour retained control of the council, the Conservatives went from zero to 20 seats at this election.

== Results summary ==
2021 Rotherham Metropolitan Borough Council election
| Party | Seats | Gains | Losses | Net gain/loss | Seats % | Votes % | Votes | +/− |
|---|---|---|---|---|---|---|---|---|
| Labour | 32 | | | ▼16 | 54.2 | 41.4 | 50,681 | ▼9.6 |
| Conservative | 20 | | | ▲20 | 33.9 | 28.4 | 34,833 | ▲20.5 |
| Rotherham Democratic Party | 3 | | | ▲3 | 5.1 | 12.0 | 14,659 | New |
| Liberal Democrats | 3 | | | ▲3 | 5.1 | 7.9 | 9,636 | ▲6.5 |
| Independent | 1 | | | Steady | 1.7 | 5.2 | 6,326 | Steady |
| Green | 0 | | | Steady | 0.0 | 3.3 | 4,091 | ▼0.3 |
| Yorkshire | 0 | | | Steady | 0.0 | 0.8 | 945 | ▲0.1 |
| SDP | 0 | | | Steady | 0.0 | 0.5 | 667 | New |
| TUSC | 0 | | | Steady | 0.0 | 0.4 | 540 | ▼0.2 |
| Workers Party | 0 | | | Steady | 0.0 | 0.1 | 183 | New |

== Ward results ==
=== Anston & Woodsetts ===
Anston & Woodsetts
| Party | Candidate | Votes | % | ±% |
|---|---|---|---|---|
| Conservative | Timothy James Baum-Dixon | 1,491 | 40.8 | |
| Conservative | Tracey Helen Wilson | 1,341 | 36.7 | |
| Conservative | Emma Jane McClure | 1,020 | 27.9 | |
| Liberal Democrats | Drew Simon Tarmey | 1,005 | 27.5 | |
| Labour | Joanne Helen Carr | 906 | 24.8 | |
| Liberal Democrats | Bev Thornley | 786 | 21.5 | |
| Labour | Simon Andrew Tweed* | 744 | 20.4 | |
| Independent | Clive Robert Jepson* | 737 | 20.2 | |
| Independent | Jonathan Charles Ireland* | 535 | 14.7 | |
| Liberal Democrats | Matt Mears | 522 | 14.3 | |
| Labour | Steve Marles* | 461 | 12.6 | |
| Green | David Foulstone | 375 | 10.3 | |
| Workers Party | Thomas Lang Darksen | 47 | 1.3 | |
| Majority | | | | |
| Turnout | | 3,661 | 38.43 | |
| Conservative win (new seat) | | | | |
| Conservative win (new seat) | | | | |
| Conservative win (new seat) | | | | |

=== Aston & Todwick ===
Aston & Todwick
| Party | Candidate | Votes | % | ±% |
|---|---|---|---|---|
| Conservative | Joshua Bacon | 1,103 | 45.6 | |
| Conservative | Aaron Barker | 1,025 | 42.4 | |
| Labour | Robert Paul Taylor* | 905 | 37.4 | |
| Labour | Amanda Marie Clarke | 783 | 32.4 | |
| Green | Louisa Kathryn Barker | 250 | 10.3 | |
| Rotherham Democratic Party | Harry Ratcliffe | 143 | 5.9 | |
| Liberal Democrats | Chris Hallam-Wall | 141 | 5.8 | |
| TUSC | Joshua Lennon Fields | 68 | 2.8 | |
| Majority | | | | |
| Turnout | | 2,430 | 34.43 | |
| Conservative win (new seat) | | | | |
| Conservative win (new seat) | | | | |

=== Aughton & Swallownest ===
Aughton & Swallownest
| Party | Candidate | Votes | % | ±% |
|---|---|---|---|---|
| Labour | Lyndsay Pitchley* | 817 | 45.5 | |
| Conservative | Jack Christopher Austin | 666 | 37.1 | |
| Conservative | Alexander William Dean | 625 | 34.8 | |
| Labour | David Neil Spence | 503 | 28.0 | |
| Rotherham Democratic Party | Mick Elliot* | 341 | 19.0 | |
| Workers Party | David James Tillery | 136 | 7.6 | |
| Liberal Democrats | Mark Lambert | 107 | 6.0 | |
| Majority | | | | |
| Turnout | | 1,810 | 27.16 | |
| Labour win (new seat) | | | | |
| Conservative win (new seat) | | | | |

=== Boston Castle ===
Boston Castle
| Party | Candidate | Votes | % | ±% |
|---|---|---|---|---|
| Labour | Saghir Alam* | 1,567 | 48.3 | |
| Labour | Rose Margaret McNeely* | 1,567 | 48.3 | |
| Labour | Taiba Khatoon Yaseen* | 1,366 | 42.1 | |
| Conservative | Ryan Alan Carney | 917 | 28.3 | |
| Yorkshire | Dennis Chad Bannan | 497 | 15.3 | |
| Rotherham Democratic Party | Gary Hardwick | 487 | 15.0 | |
| Liberal Democrats | Mike Shaw | 405 | 12.5 | |
| Rotherham Democratic Party | Martin David Howells | 386 | 11.9 | |
| Rotherham Democratic Party | Adam James Rodgers | 286 | 8.8 | |
| TUSC | Lauren Jane Howie | 214 | 6.6 | |
| Majority | | | | |
| Turnout | | 3,253 | 32.68 | |
| Labour win (new seat) | | | | |
| Labour win (new seat) | | | | |
| Labour win (new seat) | | | | |

=== Bramley & Ravenfield ===
Bramley & Ravenfield
| Party | Candidate | Votes | % | ±% |
|---|---|---|---|---|
| Conservative | Gregory Reynolds | 1,155 | 49.3 | |
| Conservative | Lewis Lennard Henry Malcolm Mills | 931 | 39.7 | |
| Labour | Andrew James Fenwick-Green | 551 | 23.5 | |
| Labour | Deborah Fenwick-Green* | 546 | 23.3 | |
| Green | Paul David Garrett | 369 | 15.7 | |
| Rotherham Democratic Party | Alan Derek Napper* | 277 | 11.8 | |
| Rotherham Democratic Party | Nigel Gelder | 227 | 9.7 | |
| Liberal Democrats | John Richard Gelder | 137 | 5.8 | |
| TUSC | Luke David Johnson | 47 | 2.0 | |
| Majority | | | | |
| Turnout | | 2,354 | 32.88 | |
| Conservative win (new seat) | | | | |
| Conservative win (new seat) | | | | |

=== Brinsworth ===
Brinsworth
| Party | Candidate | Votes | % | ±% |
|---|---|---|---|---|
| Liberal Democrats | Adam Jonathon Carter* | 1,345 | 55.9 | |
| Liberal Democrats | Charlotte Rachel Carter | 1,108 | 46.0 | |
| Labour | Alan Buckley* | 774 | 32.2 | |
| Labour | Philippa Wildin | 424 | 17.6 | |
| Conservative | Andrew Matthew Gorman | 351 | 14.6 | |
| Independent | Nigel Gary Simpson* | 229 | 9.5 | |
| Rotherham Democratic Party | Royce Skelding | 80 | 3.3 | |
| Majority | | | | |
| Turnout | | 2,419 | 32.06 | |
| Liberal Democrats win (new seat) | | | | |
| Liberal Democrats win (new seat) | | | | |

=== Dalton & Thrybergh ===
Dalton & Thrybergh
| Party | Candidate | Votes | % | ±% |
|---|---|---|---|---|
| Independent | Michael Donald Paul Sylvester | 1,103 | 62.5 | |
| Labour | Joanna Baker-Rogers | 512 | 29.0 | |
| Labour | Dianne Caster | 432 | 24.5 | |
| Conservative | Jane Rosemary Salt | 397 | 22.5 | |
| Liberal Democrats | Steve Simmons | 117 | 6.6 | |
| Majority | | | | |
| Turnout | | 1,771 | 26.30 | |
| Independent win (new seat) | | | | |
| Labour win (new seat) | | | | |

=== Dinnington ===
Dinnington
| Party | Candidate | Votes | % | ±% |
|---|---|---|---|---|
| Conservative | Charlie Andrew Wooding | 1,137 | 41.4 | |
| Conservative | Benjamin John Whomersley | 916 | 33.3 | |
| Conservative | Sophie Castledine-Dack | 841 | 30.6 | |
| Labour | Jeanette Mallinder* | 799 | 29.1 | |
| Labour | John Vjestica* | 738 | 26.9 | |
| Labour | Gordon Watson* | 712 | 25.9 | |
| Independent | Dave Smith | 601 | 21.9 | |
| Independent | Jean Hart | 389 | 14.2 | |
| Green | Ian David Barkley | 316 | 11.5 | |
| Green | Wendy Hamilton | 308 | 11.2 | |
| Liberal Democrats | Phil Bowers | 284 | 10.3 | |
| Majority | | | | |
| Turnout | | 2,758 | 29.77 | |
| Conservative win (new seat) | | | | |
| Conservative win (new seat) | | | | |
| Conservative win (new seat) | | | | |

=== Greasbrough ===
Greasbrough
| Party | Candidate | Votes | % | ±% |
|---|---|---|---|---|
| Labour | Sarah Ann Allen* | 526 | 36.2 | |
| Rotherham Democratic Party | Robert William Elliott* | 518 | 35.6 | |
| Conservative | Josephine Margaret Taylor | 430 | 29.6 | |
| Labour | John Richard Henry Williams* | 385 | 26.5 | |
| Green | Keith Gordon Cooper | 210 | 14.4 | |
| Rotherham Democratic Party | Brian Leng | 147 | 10.1 | |
| Green | Tony Mabbott | 74 | 5.1 | |
| Liberal Democrats | Tony Hannan | 68 | 4.7 | |
| Majority | | | | |
| Turnout | | 1,461 | 24.24 | |
| Labour win (new seat) | | | | |
| Rotherham Democratic Party win (new seat) | | | | |

=== Hellaby & Maltby West ===
Hellaby & Maltby West
| Party | Candidate | Votes | % | ±% |
|---|---|---|---|---|
| Conservative | Simon Ashley Ball | 1,158 | 55.5 | |
| Labour | Jenny Andrews* | 833 | 39.9 | |
| Conservative | Davey Glynn Stewart Hamilton | 798 | 38.3 | |
| Labour | Richard John Thomas Hunter | 558 | 26.7 | |
| Green | Mark Bennett Scott | 178 | 8.5 | |
| Liberal Democrats | Frances Jane Taylor | 92 | 4.4 | |
| Rotherham Democratic Party | Craig Wathall | 85 | 4.1 | |
| Majority | | | | |
| Turnout | | 2,092 | 33.10 | |
| Conservative win (new seat) | | | | |
| Labour win (new seat) | | | | |

=== Hoober ===
Hoober
| Party | Candidate | Votes | % | ±% |
|---|---|---|---|---|
| Labour | Denise Lelliott* | 1,084 | 45.1 | |
| Labour | David John Roche* | 1,008 | 42.0 | |
| Conservative | Emily Jill Barley | 873 | 36.3 | |
| Labour | Brian Steele* | 872 | 36.3 | |
| Conservative | Martin Needham | 784 | 32.6 | |
| Conservative | Daniel Thompson | 720 | 30.0 | |
| Green | Thomas Walter Hill | 254 | 10.6 | |
| Rotherham Democratic Party | Sue Fletcher | 231 | 9.6 | |
| Rotherham Democratic Party | Amanda Sales-McHale | 198 | 8.2 | |
| Rotherham Democratic Party | Pat Schwalbe | 140 | 5.8 | |
| Liberal Democrats | Steve Scutt | 137 | 5.7 | |
| Majority | | | | |
| Turnout | | 2,411 | 24.95 | |
| Labour win (new seat) | | | | |
| Labour win (new seat) | | | | |
| Conservative win (new seat) | | | | |

=== Keppel ===
Keppel
| Party | Candidate | Votes | % | ±% |
|---|---|---|---|---|
| Labour | Maggi Clark* | 1,204 | 40.4 | |
| Labour | Tony Browne | 1,117 | 37.5 | |
| Rotherham Democratic Party | Paul Hague* | 993 | 33.3 | |
| Conservative | Alan William Sherriff | 917 | 30.8 | |
| Labour | Eddie Coates-Madden | 754 | 25.3 | |
| Rotherham Democratic Party | Lisa Sally Silcock | 681 | 22.8 | |
| Rotherham Democratic Party | Sandra Marriott* | 642 | 21.5 | |
| Yorkshire | Peter Robert Key | 448 | 15.0 | |
| Liberal Democrats | Sam Reddington | 264 | 8.9 | |
| Majority | | | | |
| Turnout | | 2,996 | 28.38 | |
| Labour win (new seat) | | | | |
| Labour win (new seat) | | | | |
| Rotherham Democratic Party win (new seat) | | | | |

=== Kilnhurst & Swinton East ===
Kilnhurst & Swinton East
| Party | Candidate | Votes | % | ±% |
|---|---|---|---|---|
| Labour | Victoria Cusworth* | 1,119 | 60.2 | |
| Labour | Stuart James Sansome* | 989 | 53.2 | |
| Conservative | Denise Helen Hall | 597 | 32.1 | |
| Liberal Democrats | Luke Anthony Binney | 126 | 6.8 | |
| SDP | Karly Buffon | 103 | 5.5 | |
| SDP | David Taylor | 84 | 4.5 | |
| Majority | | | | |
| Turnout | | 1,876 | 29.82 | |
| Labour win (new seat) | | | | |
| Labour win (new seat) | | | | |

=== Maltby East ===
Maltby East
| Party | Candidate | Votes | % | ±% |
|---|---|---|---|---|
| Conservative | Adam James Tinsley | 648 | 37.9 | |
| Conservative | Lee James Hunter | 630 | 36.8 | |
| Labour | Diann Bernadette Fitzgibbons | 549 | 32.1 | |
| Independent | Shaz Biggin | 510 | 29.8 | |
| Labour | Janet Law | 393 | 23.0 | |
| Rotherham Democratic Party | Brett Harrison Meese | 115 | 6.7 | |
| Rotherham Democratic Party | Harrison James Meese | 73 | 4.3 | |
| Liberal Democrats | Darren Hallam-Wall | 43 | 2.5 | |
| Majority | | | | |
| Turnout | | 1,717 | 25.75 | |
| Conservative win (new seat) | | | | |
| Conservative win (new seat) | | | | |

=== Rawmarsh East ===
Rawmarsh East
| Party | Candidate | Votes | % | ±% |
|---|---|---|---|---|
| Labour | Dave Sheppard* | 703 | 47.9 | |
| Labour | Rachel Elizabeth Margaret Hughes | 604 | 41.1 | |
| Conservative | William Salt | 458 | 31.2 | |
| Rotherham Democratic Party | Ben Wayne Eyre | 280 | 19.1 | |
| Rotherham Democratic Party | Sophie Louise Shaw | 138 | 9.4 | |
| Liberal Democrats | Margaret Eileen Towler | 115 | 7.8 | |
| Majority | | | | |
| Turnout | | 1,476 | 21.42 | |
| Labour win (new seat) | | | | |
| Labour win (new seat) | | | | |

=== Rawmarsh West ===
Rawmarsh West
| Party | Candidate | Votes | % | ±% |
|---|---|---|---|---|
| Labour | Bob Bird* | 724 | 45.3 | |
| Conservative | Jill Thompson | 583 | 36.5 | |
| Labour | Beth Marles | 522 | 32.6 | |
| Rotherham Democratic Party | Thomas Sawford | 218 | 13.6 | |
| Rotherham Democratic Party | Sean Anthony Ardron | 209 | 13.1 | |
| Green | James John Cleary | 174 | 10.9 | |
| Liberal Democrats | Phil Aisthorpe | 124 | 7.8 | |
| TUSC | William Mark Price | 38 | 2.4 | |
| Majority | | | | |
| Turnout | | 1,612 | 23.53 | |
| Labour win (new seat) | | | | |
| Conservative win (new seat) | | | | |

=== Rother Vale ===
Rother Vale
| Party | Candidate | Votes | % | ±% |
|---|---|---|---|---|
| Liberal Democrats | Firas Miro | 551 | 38.0 | |
| Labour | Amy Caroline Brookes* | 491 | 33.8 | |
| Liberal Democrats | David Edward Wilson | 418 | 28.8 | |
| Labour | Bob Walsh* | 411 | 28.3 | |
| Conservative | William Guy David Morgan | 326 | 22.5 | |
| Conservative | Natalie Thomas Stafford | 299 | 20.6 | |
| Rotherham Democratic Party | David Haythorne | 88 | 6.1 | |
| TUSC | Neil Adshead | 58 | 4.0 | |
| Rotherham Democratic Party | Carlie Louise Stanley | 37 | 2.5 | |
| Rotherham Democratic Party | John Walker | 17 | 1.2 | |
| Majority | | | | |
| Turnout | | 1,456 | 24.04 | |
| Liberal Democrats win (new seat) | | | | |
| Labour win (new seat) | | | | |

=== Rotherham East ===
Rotherham East
| Party | Candidate | Votes | % | ±% |
|---|---|---|---|---|
| Labour | Wendy Cooksey* | 1,366 | 54.7 | |
| Labour | Tajamal Khan* | 1,097 | 43.9 | |
| Labour | Rukhsana Bibi Haleem | 1,024 | 41.0 | |
| Conservative | Barrie Marsh | 641 | 25.7 | |
| Green | Richard William Penycate | 457 | 18.3 | |
| Rotherham Democratic Party | Kath Reeder* | 354 | 14.2 | |
| Rotherham Democratic Party | Sheila Marriott | 296 | 11.8 | |
| Liberal Democrats | Cheryl Lynn Jones | 284 | 11.4 | |
| Rotherham Democratic Party | Harry David McKenzie | 269 | 10.8 | |
| Majority | | | | |
| Turnout | | 2,512 | 24.13 | |
| Labour win (new seat) | | | | |
| Labour win (new seat) | | | | |
| Labour win (new seat) | | | | |

=== Rotherham West ===
Rotherham West
| Party | Candidate | Votes | % | ±% |
|---|---|---|---|---|
| Rotherham Democratic Party | Ian Paul Jones* | 1,246 | 39.7 | |
| Labour | Ben Aveyard | 1,136 | 36.2 | |
| Labour | Eve Keenan* | 1,012 | 32.2 | |
| Labour | Carole Ann Foster | 1,004 | 32.0 | |
| Independent | Simon Currie | 795 | 25.3 | |
| Rotherham Democratic Party | Roger Wainwright | 769 | 24.5 | |
| Rotherham Democratic Party | Kelly Marie Bramley | 673 | 21.4 | |
| Conservative | Ruth Pauline Marsh | 619 | 19.7 | |
| Independent | Ishtiaq Ahmad | 248 | 7.9 | |
| Liberal Democrats | Julie Elizabeth Read | 195 | 6.2 | |
| Majority | | | | |
| Turnout | | 3,155 | 31.37 | |
| Rotherham Democratic Party win (new seat) | | | | |
| Labour win (new seat) | | | | |
| Labour win (new seat) | | | | |

=== Sitwell ===
Sitwell
| Party | Candidate | Votes | % | ±% |
|---|---|---|---|---|
| Conservative | Simon Lee Burnett | 1,471 | 36.5 | |
| Conservative | David Frank Fisher | 1,425 | 35.4 | |
| Labour | Tony Griffin | 1,071 | 26.6 | |
| Independent | Mick Bower | 1,054 | 26.2 | |
| Conservative | Mohammed Osman Suleman | 1,045 | 26.0 | |
| Labour | Barbara Carol Brookes | 967 | 24.0 | |
| Labour | Haroon Rashid | 941 | 23.4 | |
| Rotherham Democratic Party | Allen Cowles* | 746 | 18.5 | |
| Liberal Democrats | Colin David Taylor | 476 | 11.8 | |
| Green | Tanya Veronica Cleary | 453 | 11.3 | |
| Rotherham Democratic Party | Peter Gerard John Short* | 372 | 9.2 | |
| Rotherham Democratic Party | Gavin Peter Shawcroft | 364 | 9.0 | |
| Majority | | | | |
| Turnout | | 4,041 | 40.88 | |
| Conservative win (new seat) | | | | |
| Conservative win (new seat) | | | | |
| Labour win (new seat) | | | | |

=== Swinton Rockingham ===
Swinton Rockingham
| Party | Candidate | Votes | % | ±% |
|---|---|---|---|---|
| Labour | Ken Wyatt* | 1,118 | 60.9 | |
| Labour | Gina Monk | 1,009 | 54.9 | |
| Conservative | Patricia Anita Collins | 596 | 32.4 | |
| Liberal Democrats | Kay Lesley Hollis | 117 | 6.4 | |
| TUSC | Christopher James Edward Bingham | 115 | 6.3 | |
| SDP | Duran Rowen Bath | 59 | 3.2 | |
| SDP | Toni Garnett | 50 | 2.7 | |
| Majority | | | | |
| Turnout | | 1,845 | 29.48 | |
| Labour win (new seat) | | | | |
| Labour win (new seat) | | | | |

=== Thurcroft & Wickersley South ===
Thurcroft & Wickersley South
| Party | Candidate | Votes | % | ±% |
|---|---|---|---|---|
| Conservative | Thomas Ryan Singleton | 1,125 | 45.9 | |
| Conservative | Zachary Aron Collingham | 1,116 | 45.5 | |
| Labour | James Jonathon Mault | 634 | 25.9 | |
| Labour | Angham Saleh Taher Ahmed | 540 | 22.0 | |
| Rotherham Democratic Party | John Turner* | 510 | 20.8 | |
| Rotherham Democratic Party | Brian Cutts* | 450 | 18.4 | |
| Liberal Democrats | Pat Tarmey | 131 | 5.3 | |
| Majority | | | | |
| Turnout | | 2,459 | 32.68 | |
| Conservative win (new seat) | | | | |
| Conservative win (new seat) | | | | |

=== Wales ===
Wales
| Party | Candidate | Votes | % | ±% |
|---|---|---|---|---|
| Labour | Dominic Edward Beck* | 1,190 | 48.9 | |
| Labour | Marnie Anne Havard | 835 | 34.3 | |
| Conservative | Barbara Mary Morris | 793 | 32.6 | |
| Conservative | Gary Smith | 786 | 32.3 | |
| Green | Paul Neville Martin | 432 | 17.7 | |
| Green | Emily Rose West | 241 | 9.9 | |
| Independent | Steve Webster | 125 | 5.1 | |
| Liberal Democrats | Oliver Tatton Boddye | 81 | 3.3 | |
| Majority | | | | |
| Turnout | | 2,447 | 34.05 | |
| Labour win (new seat) | | | | |
| Labour win (new seat) | | | | |

=== Wath ===
Wath
| Party | Candidate | Votes | % | ±% |
|---|---|---|---|---|
| Labour | Alan Atkin* | 882 | 51.9 | |
| Labour | Sheila Anne Cowen | 804 | 47.3 | |
| Conservative | Tyrrell Jane Bingham | 490 | 28.9 | |
| SDP | Micky Newman | 261 | 15.4 | |
| Liberal Democrats | Ingrid Mary Frances House | 176 | 10.4 | |
| SDP | Wayne Anthony Roger Pike | 110 | 6.5 | |
| Majority | | | | |
| Turnout | | 1,711 | 25.41 | |
| Labour win (new seat) | | | | |
| Labour win (new seat) | | | | |

=== Wickersley North ===
Wickersley North
| Party | Candidate | Votes | % | ±% |
|---|---|---|---|---|
| Labour | Sue Ellis* | 1,466 | 43.3 | |
| Labour | Emma Elizabeth Hoddinott* | 1,337 | 39.5 | |
| Labour | Chris Read* | 1,295 | 38.3 | |
| Conservative | Martyn Lawton Parker | 1,042 | 30.8 | |
| Rotherham Democratic Party | Rob Felstead | 726 | 21.5 | |
| Conservative | Mohammed Suleman | 547 | 16.2 | |
| Rotherham Democratic Party | Tracy Louise Green | 486 | 14.4 | |
| Rotherham Democratic Party | Leslie James Hince | 361 | 10.7 | |
| Liberal Democrats | Linda Read | 281 | 8.3 | |
| Majority | | | | |
| Turnout | | 3,401 | 32.26 | |
| Labour win (new seat) | | | | |
| Labour win (new seat) | | | | |
| Labour win (new seat) | | | | |

== Changes 2021–2024 ==
=== Anston & Woodsetts ===
A by-election was held on 9 December 2021 after the resignation of Cllr Emma McClure

Anston & Woodsetts
| Party | Candidate | Votes | % | ±% |
|---|---|---|---|---|
| Liberal Democrats | Drew Simon Tarmey | 1,016 | 38.6 | +11.1 |
| Conservative | Adrian John Knight | 686 | 26.1 | −1.8 |
| Labour | Simon Andrew Tweed | 533 | 20.3 | −0.1 |
| Independent | Clive Robert Jepson | 189 | 7.2 | −13.0 |
| Independent | Jonathan Charles Ireland | 118 | 4.5 | −10.2 |
| Green | Charles David Dowsing Foulstone | 63 | 2.4 | −7.9 |
| Yorkshire | Christopher Michael Whitwood | 20 | 0.8 | New |
| Rotherham Democratic Party | Allen Cowles | 6 | 0.2 | New |
| Majority | | 330 | 12.5 | N/A |
| Turnout | | 2,634 | 28.02 | −10.41 |
| Liberal Democrats gain from Conservative | | Swing | | |

=== Aughton & Swallownest ===
A by-election was held on 9 December 2021 after the resignation of Cllr Jack Austin

Aughton & Swallownest
| Party | Candidate | Votes | % | ±% |
|---|---|---|---|---|
| Labour | Robert Paul Taylor | 645 | 50.8 | +22.8 |
| Conservative | Julia Helen Mitchell | 496 | 39.1 | +2.0 |
| Green | Louisa Kathryn Barker | 59 | 4.6 | New |
| Yorkshire | Jack Bannan | 35 | 2.8 | New |
| TUSC | Paul Marshall | 32 | 2.5 | New |
| Rotherham Democratic Party | Gavin Peter Shawcroft | 15 | 1.2 | −17.8 |
| Liberal Democrats | Mark Lambert | 14 | 1.1 | −4.9 |
| Majority | | 149 | 11.7 | N/A |
| Turnout | | 1,299 | 19.94 | −7.22 |
| Labour gain from Conservative | | Swing | | |

=== Keppel ===
A by-election was held on 27 January 2023 after the resignation of Cllr Paul Hague

Keppel
| Party | Candidate | Votes | % | ±% |
|---|---|---|---|---|
| Labour | Carole Ann Foster | 745 | 36.1 | +10.8 |
| Liberal Democrats | Khoulod Ghanem | 445 | 21.6 | +12.7 |
| Independent | Sid Currie | 381 | 18.5 | New |
| Yorkshire | Peter Robert Key | 314 | 15.2 | +0.2 |
| Conservative | Mohammed Osman Suleman | 119 | 5.8 | −25.0 |
| Green | Paul Neville Martin | 59 | 2.9 | New |
| Majority | | | | |
| Turnout | | 2,067 | 19.94 | −8.44 |
| Labour gain from Rotherham Democratic Party | | Swing | | |

=== Dinnington ===
Dinnington: 13 July 2023
| Party | Candidate | Votes | % | ±% |
|---|---|---|---|---|
| Conservative | Julz Hall | 1,064 | 42.7 | +6.5 |
| Labour | John Vjestica | 820 | 32.9 | +7.4 |
| Liberal Democrats | Matt Mears | 262 | 10.5 | +1.4 |
| Independent | Dave Smith | 196 | 7.9 | –11.3 |
| Reform | Tony Harrison | 61 | 2.4 | N/A |
| Green | Paul Martin | 59 | 2.4 | –7.7 |
| Yorkshire | Peter Kay | 28 | 1.1 | N/A |
| Majority | | 244 | 9.8 | |
| Turnout | | 2,496 | 27.4 | |
| Registered electors | | 9,117 | | |
| Conservative hold | | Swing | ▼0.5 | |

In July 2023, following the resignation of a Dinnington Ward councillor, the Conservatives successfully defended the seat. The by-election was labelled as ‘crucial’ as it was seen as a 'red wall' area. The Conservatives increased their vote share.

=== Kilnhurst and Swinton East ===
Kilnhurst and Swinton East: 2 November 2023
| Party | Candidate | Votes | % | ±% |
|---|---|---|---|---|
| Labour | Nigel Harper | 810 | 64.6 | +7.1 |
| Conservative | Patricia Collins | 293 | 23.4 | –7.3 |
| Reform | Adam Wood | 58 | 4.6 | N/A |
| Yorkshire | Peter Key | 38 | 3.0 | N/A |
| Liberal Democrats | John Gelder | 30 | 2.4 | –4.1 |
| Green | Paul Martin | 25 | 2.0 | N/A |
| Majority | | 517 | 41.2 | |
| Turnout | | 1,254 | 20.0 | |
| Registered electors | | 6,270 | | |
| Labour hold | | Swing | ▲7.2 | |

=== Changes of allegiance ===
In May 2023, Councillors Emily Barley and Jill Thompson resigned from the Conservative Group and formed the 'Independent Conservative' Group. Councillor Charlie Wooding was suspended from the Conservative Group whilst an investigation took place regarding his attendance, and he subsequently resigned triggering a by-election.

The Rotherham Democratic Party disbanded in 2022, with its councillors thereafter sitting as independents.
