= 2021 Solihull Metropolitan Borough Council election =

2021 UK local government election

← 2019	6 May 2021	2022 →

18 out of 51 seats for the Solihull Metropolitan Borough Council 26 seats needed for a majority

	First party	Second party	Third party
Party	Conservative	Green	Liberal Democrats
Seats before	26	14	5
Seats after	30	15	3
Seat change	▲3	▲1	▼3
Popular vote	34,478	13,112	7,800
Percentage	53.8%	20.5%	12.2%
Swing	+7.9%	-5.1%	-1.3%
	Fourth party	Fifth party
Party	Labour	Independent
Seats before	3	1
Seats after	2	1
Seat change	▼1	Steady
Popular vote	8,264	311
Percentage	12.9%	0.5%
Swing	+0.9%	-2.6%
- Map showing the results of the 2021 Solihull Metropolitan Borough Council election
Council control before election
Conservative
Council control after election
Conservative

The 2021 Solihull Metropolitan Borough Council election took place on 6 May 2021 to elect members of Solihull Metropolitan Borough Council in England. This was on the same day as other local elections. One-third of the seats were up for election.

== Results summary ==
2021 Solihull Metropolitan Borough Council election
Party	This election			Full council			This election		
Party	Seats	Net	Seats %	Other	Total	Total %	Votes	Votes %	+/−
Conservative	12	▲3	66.7	18	30	58.8	34,478	53.8	+7.9
Green	5	▲1	27.8	10	15	29.4	13,112	20.5	-5.1
Liberal Democrats	1	▼3	5.6	2	3	5.9	7,800	12.2	-1.3
Labour	0	▼1	0.0	2	2	3.9	8,264	12.9	+0.9
Independent	0	Steady	0.0	1	1	2.0	311	0.5	-2.6
Reform UK	0	Steady	0.0	0	0	0.0	111	0.2	New
The Democratic Party	0	Steady	0.0	0	0	0.0	28	<0.1	New

== Ward results ==
=== Bickenhill ===
Bickenhill
Party	Candidate	Votes	%	±%
Conservative	Jim Ryan	2,098	67.3	+6.6
Labour	Margaret Brittin	516	16.6	−6.4
Green	Stephen Rymer	350	11.2	−5.2
Liberal Democrats	Gayle Monk	154	5.0	N/A
Majority		1,582	50.7	+13.0
Turnout		3,118		
Conservative hold		Swing	+6.5	

=== Blythe ===
Blythe
Party	Candidate	Votes	%	±%
Conservative	James Butler	2,880	67.6	+16.5
Green	Rachel Douglas	610	14.3	+8.0
Labour	Martin Tolman	558	13.1	+4.1
Independent	Peter Bulcock	212	5.0	N/A
Majority		2,270	53.3	+35.7
Turnout		4,260		
Conservative hold		Swing	+4.3	

=== Castle Bromwich ===
Castle Bromwich
Party	Candidate	Votes	%	±%
Conservative	Martin McCarthy	1,652	50.6	−20.6
Green	Ian Shore	1,153	35.3	+26.0
Labour	Emma Chidler	461	14.1	−3.8
Majority		499	15.3	−38.5
Turnout		3,266		
Conservative hold		Swing	-23.3	

=== Chelmsley Wood ===
Chelmsley Wood
Party	Candidate	Votes	%	±%
Green	Shesh Sheshabhatter	1,115	60.2	−14.9
Conservative	James Hughes	380	20.5	+16.4
Labour	Hazel Dawkins	328	17.7	+7.5
The Democratic Party	Matthew Ward	28	1.5	N/A
Majority		735	39.7	−24.9
Turnout		1,851		
Green hold		Swing	-15.7	

=== Dorridge and Hockley Heath ===
Dorridge and Hockley Heath
Party	Candidate	Votes	%	±%
Conservative	Ken Meeson	3,029	69.58	▼1.55
Labour	David Brittin	487	11.19	▲1.91
Green	Iona McIntyre	420	9.65	▼0.69
Liberal Democrats	Paul McCabe	306	7.03	▼2.22
Reform UK	Scott Martin	111	2.55	N/A
Majority		2,542	58.40	▼2.39
Turnout		4,353		
Conservative hold		Swing		

=== Elmdon ===
Elmdon (2 seats)
Party	Candidate	Votes	%	±%
Conservative	Yvonne Clements	1,399	43.6	+8.7
Liberal Democrats	Richard Long	1,389	43.3	+6.7
Conservative	Keith Green	1,201		
Liberal Democrats	Brad Tucker	1,179		
Labour	John Doherty	418	13.0	+2.8
Labour	Mark Szrejder	295		
Majority		10		
Turnout		3,553	37.47	
Conservative gain from Liberal Democrats		Swing		
Liberal Democrats hold		Swing		

=== Kingshurst and Fordbridge ===
Kingshurst and Fordbridge
Party	Candidate	Votes	%	±%
Green	Nathan Moses	831	42.33	▲35.50
Conservative	Alan Feeney	689	35.10	▲21.80
Labour	Flo Nash	443	22.57	▼23.24
Majority		142	7.23	
Turnout		1,963		
Green gain from Labour		Swing		

=== Knowle ===
Knowle
Party	Candidate	Votes	%	±%
Conservative	Dave Pinwell	3,121	73.50	▼1.64
Labour	Simon Johnson	461	10.86	▼1.77
Green	Mark Amphlett	370	8.71	▼3.52
Liberal Democrats	Kate Jones	294	6.92	N/A
Majority		2,660	62.65	▲0.14
Turnout		4,246		
Conservative hold		Swing		

=== Lyndon ===
Lyndon
Party	Candidate	Votes	%	±%
Conservative	Josh O'Nyons	1,684	44.15	▲13.22
Liberal Democrats	Ade Adeyemo	1,556	40.80	▲4.41
Labour	Nick Stephens	574	15.05	▼8.74
Majority		128	3.36	
Turnout		3,814		
Conservative gain from Liberal Democrats		Swing		

=== Meriden ===
Meriden
Party	Candidate	Votes	%	±%
Conservative	Tony Dicicco	2,850	65.88	▲6.13
Green	Alison Wilson	1,008	23.30	▲16.38
Labour	Sam Mather	468	10.82	▼4.91
Majority		1,842	33.58	▼8.57
Turnout		4,326		
Conservative hold		Swing		

=== Olton ===
Olton
Party	Candidate	Votes	%	±%
Conservative	Daniel Gibbin	2,148	47.85	▲8.19
Liberal Democrats	Michael Carthew	1,800	40.10	▼3.03
Labour	Catherine Gulati	541	12.05	▲1.28
Majority		348	7.75	
Turnout		4,489		
Conservative gain from Liberal Democrats		Swing		

=== Shirley East ===
Shirley East
Party	Candidate	Votes	%	±%
Conservative	Karen Grinsell	1,866	47.23	▼3.64
Green	Antony Lowe	1,757	44.47	▲16.39
Labour	Deon Bailey	328	8.30	▼3.80
Majority		109	2.76	▼20.02
Turnout		3,951		
Conservative hold		Swing		

=== Shirley South ===
Shirley South
Party	Candidate	Votes	%	±%
Green	Max McLoughlin	2,122	51.05	▲8.54
Conservative	Howard Nichols	1,606	38.63	▲1.10
Labour	Elizabeth Thacker	330	7.94	▲1.32
Independent	Rosemary Worsley	99	2.38	N/A
Majority		516	12.42	▲7.44
Turnout		4,157		
Green hold		Swing		

=== Shirley West ===
Shirley West
Party	Candidate	Votes	%	±%
Green	Maggie Allen	1,814	51.10	▼6.75
Conservative	Lachhman Bhambra	1,238	34.87	▲6.45
Labour	Kevin Round	498	14.03	▲4.11
Majority		576	16.23	▼16.20
Turnout		3,550		
Green hold		Swing		

=== Silhill ===
Silhill
Party	Candidate	Votes	%	±%
Conservative	Peter Hogarth	2,735	67.23	▲1.43
Labour	Janet Marsh	757	18.61	▲6.17
Liberal Democrats	Justin McCarthy	576	14.16	▼0.58
Majority		1,978	48.62	▼2.44
Turnout		4,068		
Conservative hold		Swing		

=== Smith's Wood ===
Smith's Wood
Party	Candidate	Votes	%	±%
Green	Jean Hamilton	1,084	59.72	▼4.08
Conservative	Angus Young	441	24.30	▲19.61
Labour	Teresa Beddis	290	15.98	▼1.80
Majority		643	35.42	▼10.60
Turnout		1,815		
Green hold		Swing		

=== St Alphege ===
St Alphege
Party	Candidate	Votes	%	±%
Conservative	Angela Sandison	3,461	69.28	▲0.35
Liberal Democrats	Frank Dawson	546	10.93	▼1.94
Labour	Ian English	511	10.23	▼0.03
Green	Trevor Barker	478	9.57	▲1.62
Majority		2,915	58.34	▲2.29
Turnout		4,996		
Conservative hold		Swing		
