= 2022 United Kingdom local elections =

Local government elections

- 5 May 2022

200 of 387 councils in Great Britain; 7 directly elected mayors
- Turnout: 35.6%
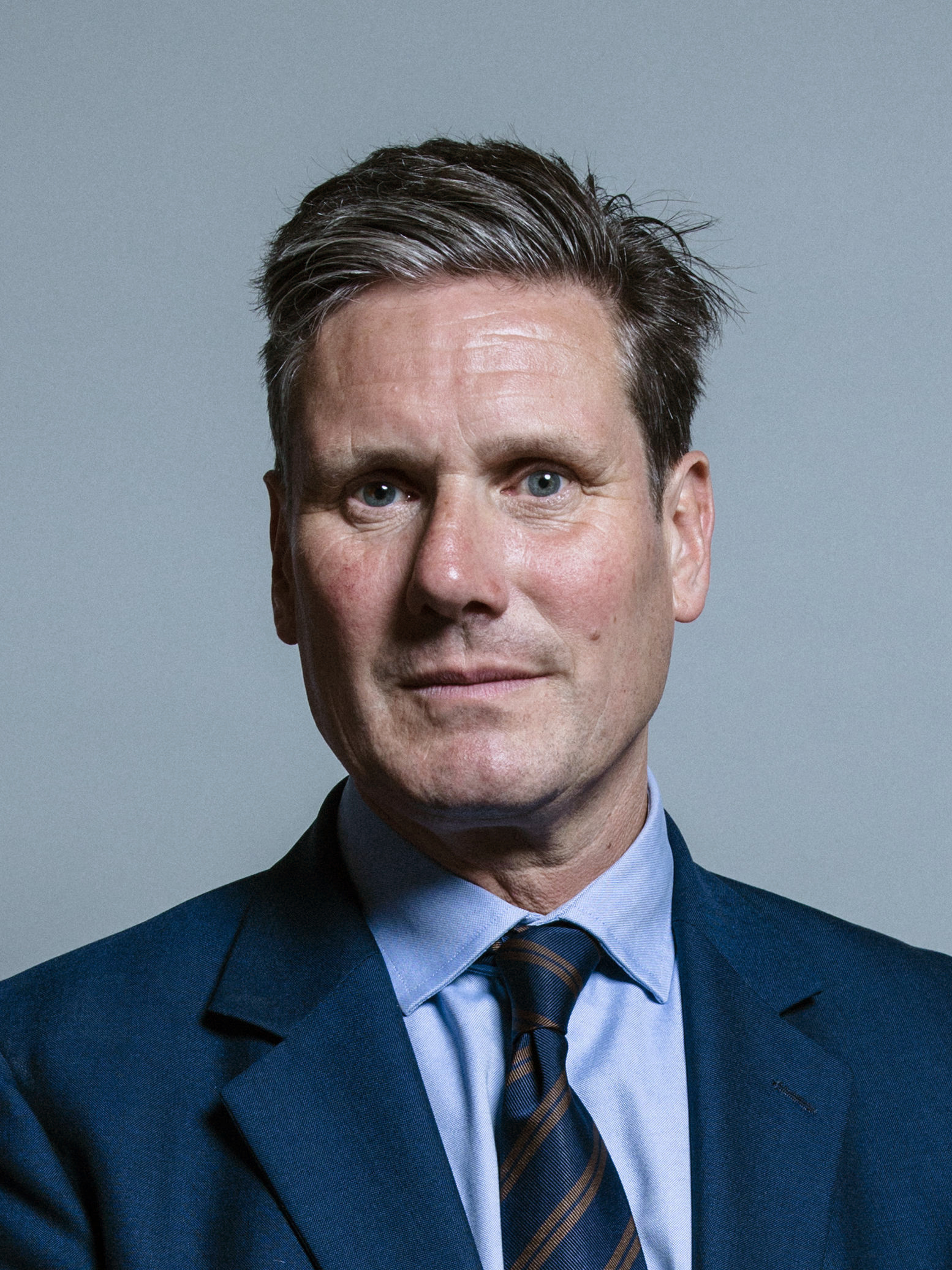

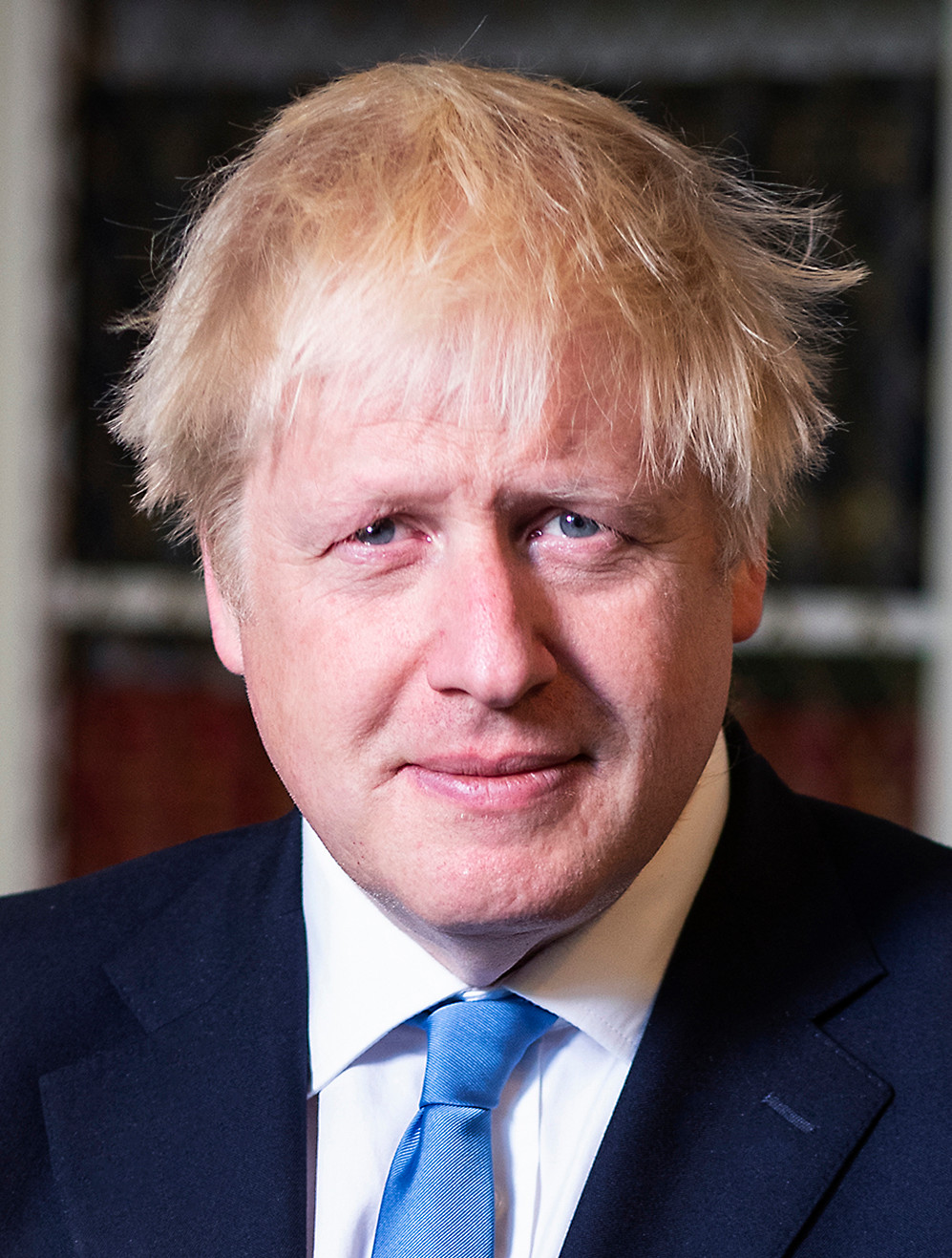

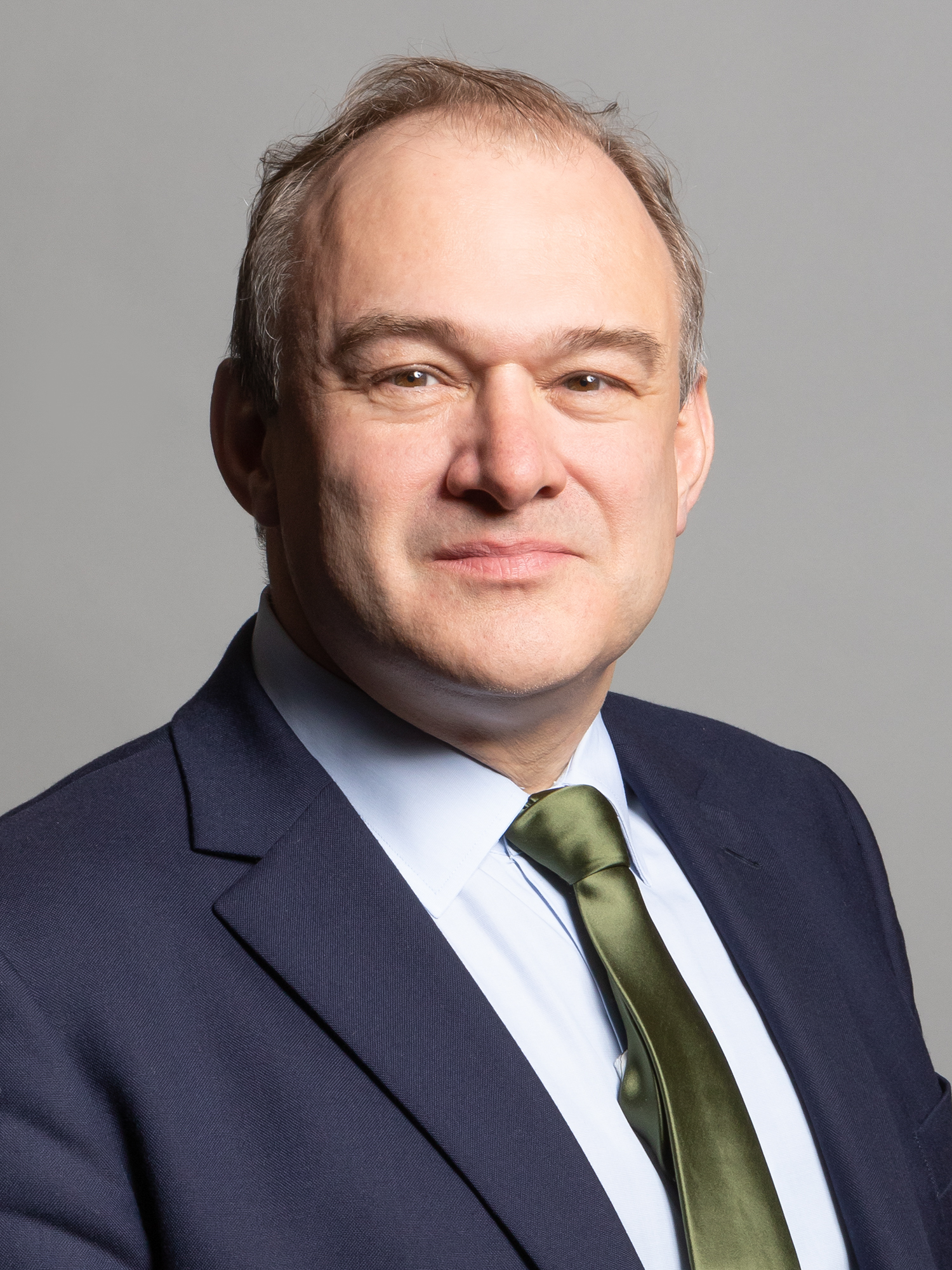

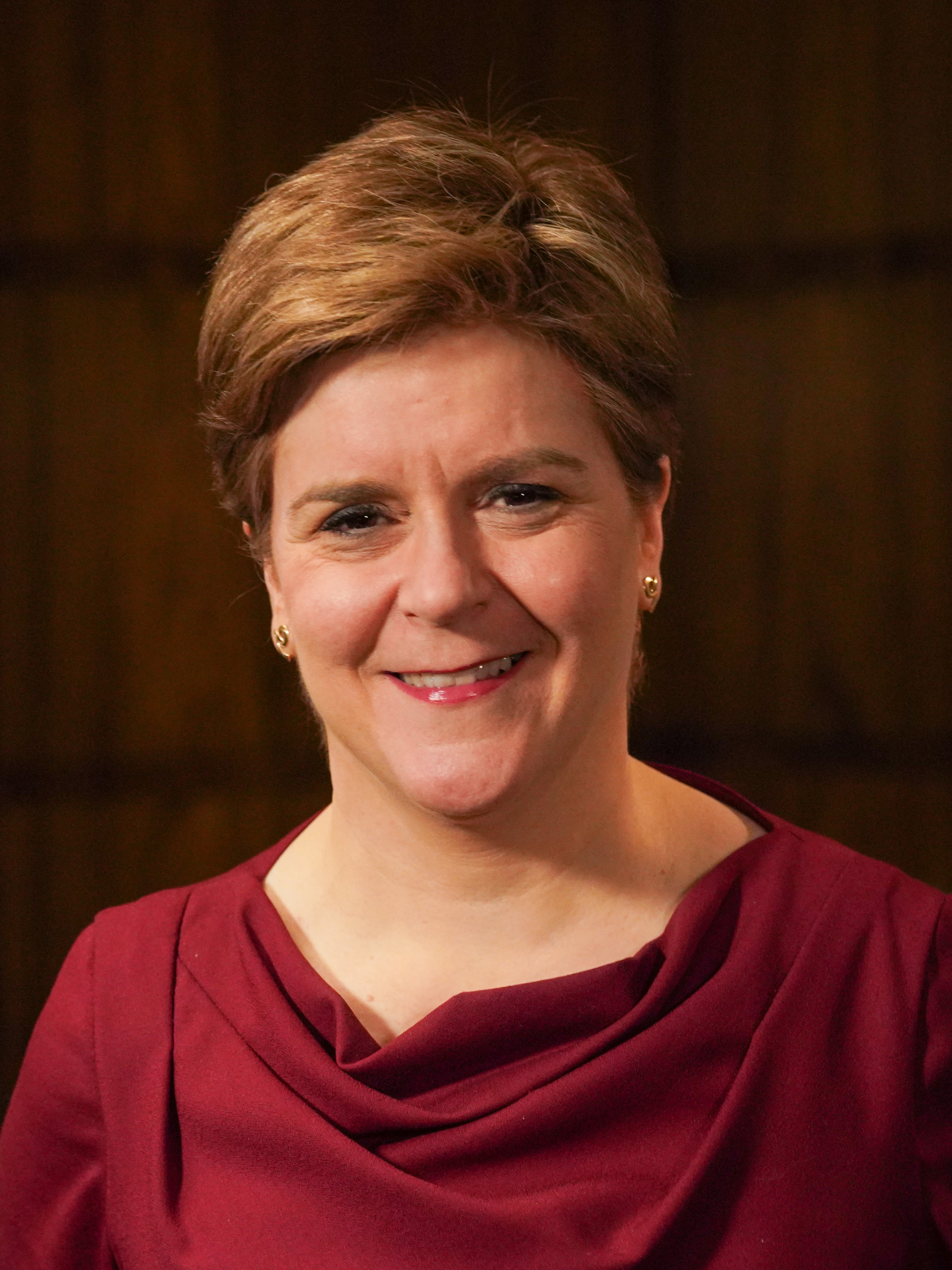

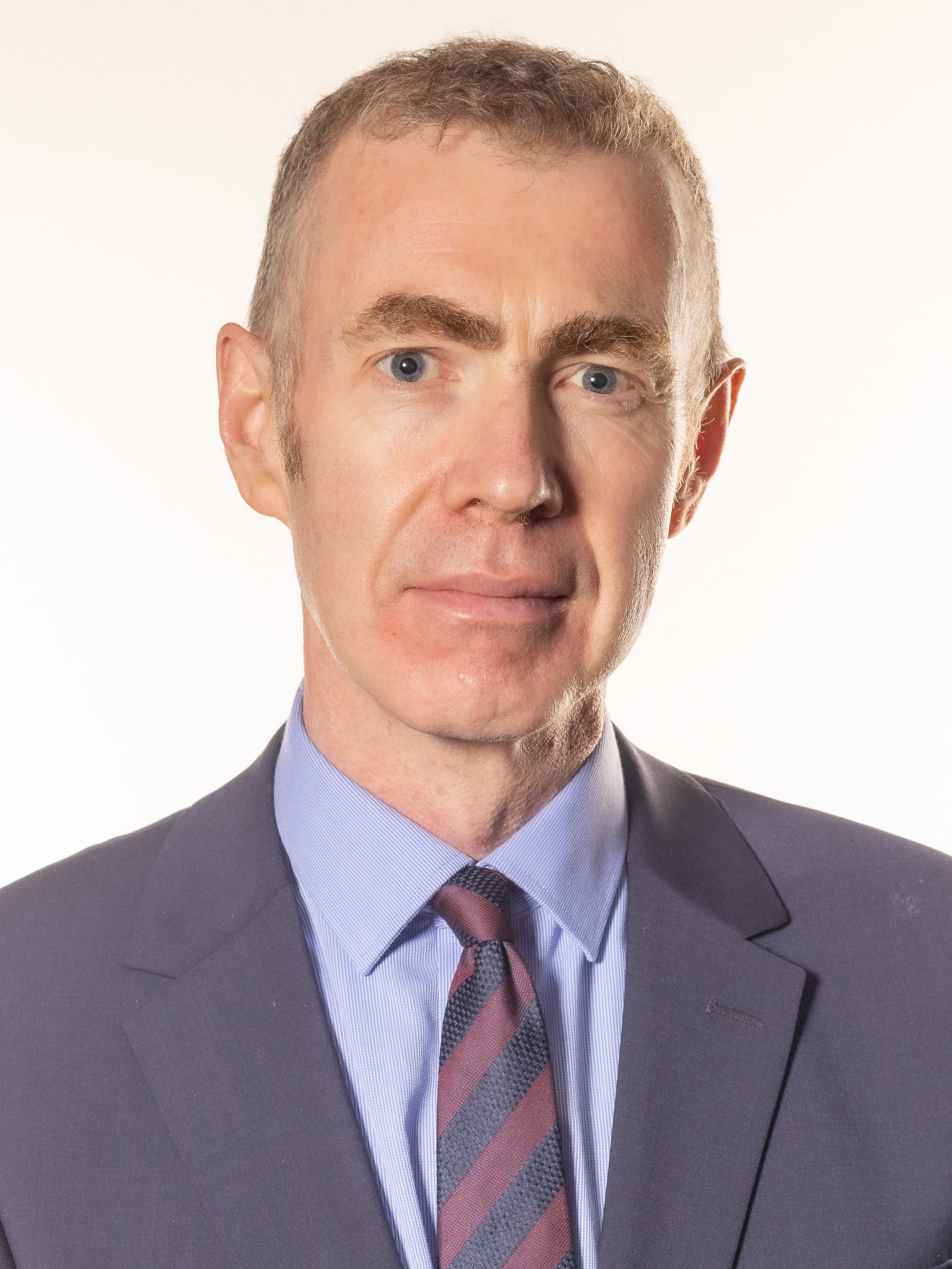

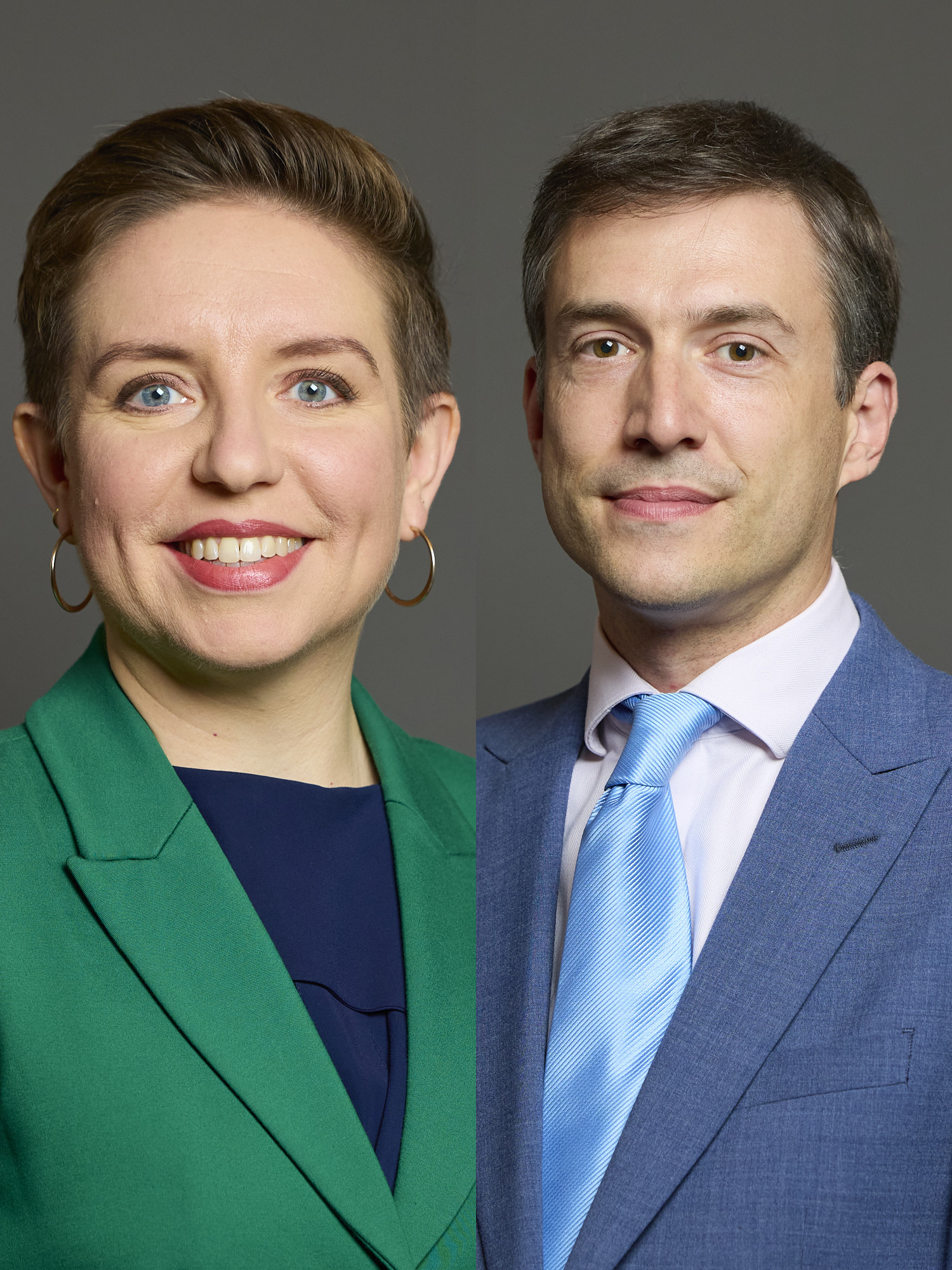
	First party	Second party	Third party
Leader	Keir Starmer	Boris Johnson	Ed Davey
Party	Labour	Conservative	Liberal Democrats
Leader since	4 April 2020	23 July 2019	27 August 2020
Seats before	5,911 seats 83 councils	7,587 seats 137 councils	2,531 seats 24 councils
Projected vote share (Note: All vote shares in the infobox are projected national vote shares calculated by the BBC under Projected National Share (PNS).)	35% ▲6%	30% ▼6%	19% ▲2%
Seats won (2022)	3,073; 74 councils	1,403; 35 councils	868; 16 councils
Councillors (after)	6,100; 88 councils	7,159; 126 councils	2,765; 27 councils
Net change (notional)	▲108 ▲5 councils	▼485 ▼11 councils	▲224 ▲3 councils
	Fourth party	Fifth party	Sixth party
Leader	Nicola Sturgeon	Adam Price	Carla Denyer & Adrian Ramsay
Party	SNP	Plaid Cymru	Green (E&W)
Leader since	14 November 2014	28 September 2018	1 October 2021
Seats before	433 seats 0 councils	207 seats 1 council	473 seats 0 councils
Projected vote share	N/A	N/A	11% ▲1%
Seats won (2022)	453; 1 council	202; 4 councils	159; 0 councils
Councillors (after)	453; 1 council	202; 4 councils	568; 0 councils
Net change (notional)	▲22 ▲1 council	▼6 ▲3 councils	▲86; 0 councils
- Map showing party control of councils following the elections.: No election; otherwise see analysis table

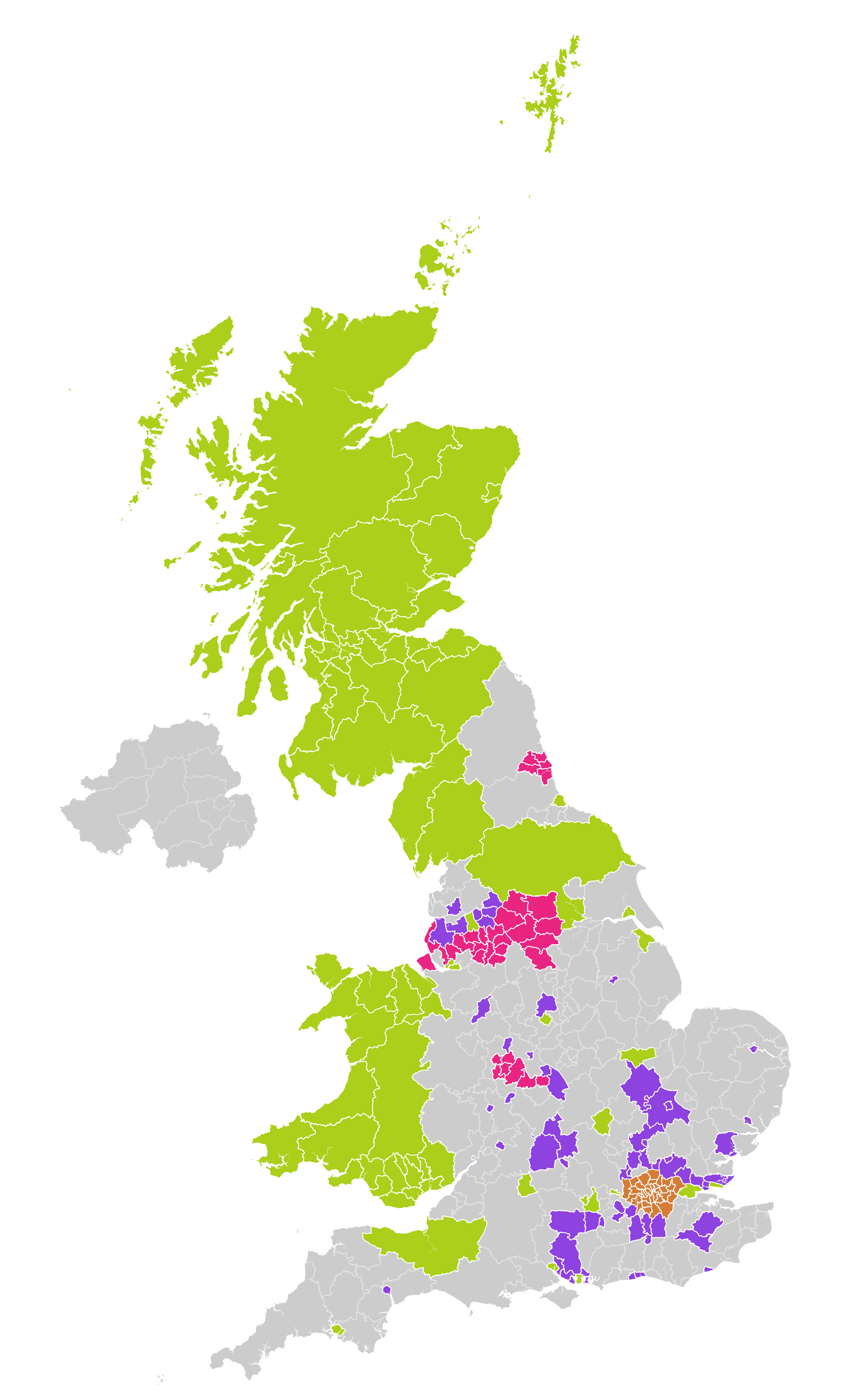
Local authorities with elections: London borough; Metropolitan borough; Unitary authority; District council; City of London Corporation; No election

The 2022 United Kingdom local elections took place on Thursday 5 May 2022. These included elections for all London borough councils, and for all local authorities in Wales and Scotland. Most seats in England were last up for election in 2018 and in Scotland and Wales in 2017. The elections coincided with the 2022 Northern Ireland Assembly election. In 91 cases, most of them in Wales, council seats were uncontested, each having only one candidate. Three seats in Scotland remained unfilled as no one nominated to fill them.

The local elections took place amid the Partygate scandal, in which it was found that numerous parties had been held at 10 Downing Street during national COVID-19 lockdowns, and COVID-19 social distancing laws were breached by numerous individuals. Public dissatisfaction over the events led to a decline in public support for Boris Johnson, the government led by him, and the Conservatives as a whole.

Across Great Britain, the governing Conservative Party had a net loss of 485 seats in comparison to 2017 in Scotland and Wales and 2018 in England, whilst Labour gained 108 seats (22 in England, 20 in Scotland, and 66 in Wales). The Liberal Democrats and the various Green parties made gains of 224 seats and 87 seats, respectively, which exceeded those of the Labour Party in England but were also seen to a more modest extent in Scotland and Wales.

== Background ==
In total, 4,411 council seats were contested in England, including irregular by-elections.

Most seats in England up for election in 2022 were last elected in 2018. The exceptions are local authorities which have undergone recent boundary reviews. In the 2018 local elections, the Labour Party made gains in London at the expense of the Conservative Party, who in turn made gains in the rest of England at the expense of the UK Independence Party (UKIP). Few councils changed overall control. Overall, UKIP lost 237 of the 243 seats it had held before the elections. According to the BBC's analysis, the results reflected a national political situation with Labour and the Conservatives "neck-and-neck".

== Overall results ==
Across Great Britain, the Conservatives had a net loss of 485 seats in comparison to 2017 in Scotland and Wales and 2018 in England, whilst Labour gained 108 seats (22 in England, 20 in Scotland, and 66 in Wales). The Liberal Democrats and the various Green parties made gains of 224 seats and 87 seats, respectively, which exceeded those of the Labour Party in England but were also seen to a more modest extent in Scotland and Wales. The Scottish National Party (SNP) gained 22 seats in Scotland whilst Plaid Cymru had a net loss of 6 seats in Wales.

Party	Councillors			Councils		
Party	Won	After	+/- (Note: Because the number of council seats shifts every year due to boundary changes and local government reorganisation, changes are notional changes calculated by the BBC.)	Won	After	+/-
Conservative	1,403	7,159	▼485	35	126	▼11
Labour	3,073	6,100	▲108	74	88	▲5
Liberal Democrats	868	2,765	▲224	16	27	▲3
Green (E&W)	159	568	▲87	0	0	Steady
SNP	453	453	▲22	0	1	Steady
Plaid Cymru	202	202	▼6	0	4	▲3
Aspire	24	24	▲24	1	1	▲1
Reform	2	7	▲2	0	0	Steady
Independent	646	2,190	▲2	3	8	▼1
No overall control	—N/a			66	132	▲1

== England ==
=== By party ===
Results of the 2022 council elections in England
Party	Councils		Councillors		Mayors	
Party	Number	Change	Number	Change	Number	Change
Labour	65	▲3	2,265	▲22	4	▼1
Conservative	35	▼10	1,078	▼336	1	▲1
No overall control	29	▲3	—N/a			
Liberal Democrats	16	▲3	712	▲194	1	Steady
Aspire	1	▲1	24	▲24	1	▲1
Independent	0	Steady	143	▲25	0	Steady
Green	0	Steady	116	▲63	0	Steady
Residents	0	Steady	51	▲7	0	Steady
Reform	0	Steady	2	▲2	0	Steady
Liberal	0	Steady	1	▲1	0	Steady
SDP	0	Steady	1	▲1	0	Steady
UKIP	0	Steady	0	▼3	0	Steady
Total	146		4,393		7	+1

=== County councils ===
County councils are the upper tier of a two-tier system of local government, with the area each council covers subdivided into district councils with different responsibilities. These are first-past-the-post or block voting elections, with a mixture of single-member and multi-member electoral divisions. County councils are elected in full every four years, with the last election having been in 2021. However, due to consultations about possible unitarisation, elections for three county councils were postponed to 2022. The government has announced plans to replace the councils with unitary authorities pending Parliamentary approval.

Elections to the new Somerset Council took place on 5 May 2022 for a unitary authority to run concurrently with the district councils until their abolition in April 2023. In a similar way, members of North Yorkshire Council were elected at the same time, with its councillors to serve as county councillors for one year and then to serve an additional four-year term as unitary councillors. Cumbria's two new unitary authorities were elected as "shadow authorities" which would go live after gaining their powers in 2023.

=== London boroughs ===
Elections for all councillors in all thirty-two London boroughs were held in 2022 in line with their normal election schedule. All twenty-five London borough councils which have not had a boundary review since before 2013 were elected based on new boundaries. The previous elections to London borough councils were held in 2018, which saw Labour win its second-best result in any London election and the Conservatives return their lowest-ever number of councillors in the capital. In 2018, Labour won control of Tower Hamlets council which had previously been under no overall control, but did not gain control of Barnet, Wandsworth or Westminster councils, which the party had targeted. Meanwhile, the Liberal Democrats gained control of Kingston upon Thames and Richmond upon Thames borough councils from the Conservatives.

The 2022 elections saw Labour gain all three of Barnet, Wandsworth and Westminster councils which they had unsuccessfully targeted in 2018. The Conservatives gained control of Harrow from Labour as well as winning the new position of mayor of Croydon, with Croydon's council under no overall control, having previously been control by Labour. Lutfur Rahman gained the position of mayor of Tower Hamlets from Labour, with his Aspire party winning a majority of seats.

Council	Seats	Party control		Details
Council	Seats	Previous	New	Details
Barking and Dagenham	51 (Note: New election boundaries)	Labour	Labour	Details
Barnet	63	Conservative	Labour	Details
Bexley	45	Conservative	Conservative	Details
Brent	57	Labour	Labour	Details
Bromley	58	Conservative	Conservative	Details
Camden	55	Labour	Labour	Details
Croydon	70	Labour	No overall control (Conservative minority)	Details
Ealing	70	Labour	Labour	Details
Enfield	63	Labour	Labour	Details
Greenwich	55	Labour	Labour	Details
Hackney	57	Labour	Labour	Details
Hammersmith and Fulham	50	Labour	Labour	Details
Haringey	57	Labour	Labour	Details
Harrow	55	Labour	Conservative	Details
Havering	55	No overall control (Conservative/independent coalition)	No overall control (HRA/Labour coalition)	Details
Hillingdon	53	Conservative	Conservative	Details
Hounslow	62	Labour	Labour	Details
Islington	51	Labour	Labour	Details
Kensington and Chelsea	50	Conservative	Conservative	Details
Kingston upon Thames	48	Liberal Democrats	Liberal Democrats	Details
Lambeth	63	Labour	Labour	Details
Lewisham	54	Labour	Labour	Details
Merton	57	Labour	Labour	Details
Newham	66	Labour	Labour	Details
Redbridge	63	Labour	Labour	Details
Richmond upon Thames	54	Liberal Democrats	Liberal Democrats	Details
Southwark	63	Labour	Labour	Details
Sutton	55	Liberal Democrats	Liberal Democrats	Details
Tower Hamlets	45	Labour	Aspire	Details
Waltham Forest	60	Labour	Labour	Details
Wandsworth	58	Conservative	Labour	Details
Westminster	54	Conservative	Labour	Details
All 32 councils	1,817			

=== Metropolitan boroughs ===
There are thirty-six metropolitan boroughs, which are single-tier local authorities. Thirty-three of them elect a third of their councillors every year for three years, with no election in each fourth year. These councils hold their elections on the same timetable, which includes elections in 2022. Birmingham City Council holds its elections on a four-year cycle from 2018, so was due to hold an election in 2022. Due to boundary changes, three councils which generally elect their councillors in thirds elected all of their councillors in 2022. They then returned to the thirds schedule, apart from St Helens Council, which moved to all-out elections every four years starting in 2022. Several other boundary reviews were delayed to 2023 due to the COVID-19 pandemic. The scheduled elections in Liverpool in 2022 were cancelled and instead the city moved to all-out elections from 2023 on new ward boundaries.

==== Elections for all councillors ====
Council	Seats	Party control		Details
Council	Seats	Previous	New	Details
Birmingham	101	Labour	Labour	Details
Bury	51	Labour	Labour	Details
Rochdale	60	Labour	Labour	Details
St Helens	48	Labour	Labour	Details
4 councils	260			

==== Election for one third of councillors ====
By-elections or uncontested wards can cause the seats up for election to be above or below one third of the council.

Council	Seats		Party control		Details
Council	up	of	Previous	New	Details
Barnsley	21	63	Labour	Labour	Details
Bolton	20	60	No overall control (Conservative minority)	No overall control (Conservative minority)	Details
Bradford	30	90	Labour	Labour	Details
Calderdale	18	51	Labour	Labour	Details
Coventry	18	54	Labour	Labour	Details
Dudley	25	72	Conservative	Conservative	Details
Gateshead	22	66	Labour	Labour	Details
Kirklees	23	69	No overall control (Labour minority)	Labour	Details
Knowsley	15	45	Labour	Labour	Details
Leeds	35	99	Labour	Labour	Details
Manchester	32	96	Labour	Labour	Details
Newcastle upon Tyne	27	78	Labour	Labour	Details
North Tyneside	20	60	Labour	Labour	Details
Oldham	21	60	Labour	Labour	Details
Salford	20	60	Labour	Labour	Details
Sandwell	24	72	Labour	Labour	Details
Sefton	22	66	Labour	Labour	Details
Sheffield	28	84	No overall control (Labour/Green coalition)	No overall control (Labour minority)	Details
Solihull	17	51	Conservative	Conservative	Details
South Tyneside	19	54	Labour	Labour	Details
Stockport	21	63	No overall control (Labour minority)	No overall control (Lib Dem minority)	Details
Sunderland	25	75	Labour	Labour	Details
Tameside	19	57	Labour	Labour	Details
Trafford	22	63	Labour	Labour	Details
Wakefield	21	63	Labour	Labour	Details
Walsall	21	60	Conservative	Conservative	Details
Wigan	26	75	Labour	Labour	Details
Wirral	23	66	No overall control (Labour minority)	No overall control (Labour minority)	Details
Wolverhampton	20	60	Labour	Labour	Details
All 29 councils	655	1,932			

=== District councils ===
==== Election of all councillors ====
Some councils which elect all their councillors every four years did so in 2022. Gosport usually elects its councillors in halves, but all seats were up for election due to new election boundaries. St Albans usually elects by thirds but all seats were up on new boundaries. Harrogate was due to elect all its councillors, but the election was cancelled due to the unitarisation of North Yorkshire, with councillors' terms being extended to April 2023, after which the district councils in North Yorkshire ceased to exist.

Council	Seats	Party control		Details
Council	Seats	Previous	New	Details
Gosport	28	Conservative	Liberal Democrats	Details
Huntingdonshire	52	Conservative	No overall control (Lib Dem/Independent/Labour/Green coalition)	Details
Newcastle-under-Lyme	44	Conservative	Conservative	Details
South Cambridgeshire	45	Liberal Democrats	Liberal Democrats	Details
St Albans	56	Liberal Democrats	Liberal Democrats	Details
All 5 councils	225			

==== Election of councillors by halves ====
District councils which elect their candidates in halves did so in 2022.

Council	Seats		Party control		Details
Council	up	of	Previous	New	Details
Adur	14	29	Conservative	Conservative	Details
Cheltenham	21	40	Liberal Democrats	Liberal Democrats	Details
Fareham	16	31	Conservative	Conservative	Details
Hastings	16	32	Labour	No overall control (Labour/Green coalition)	Details
Nuneaton and Bedworth	17	34	Conservative	Conservative	Details
Oxford	24	48	Labour	Labour	Details
All 6 councils	108	214			

==== Election of councillors by thirds ====
District councils which elect by thirds that held elections in 2022. Carlisle, Craven and South Lakeland had been due to have a third of councillors up for election but these were cancelled due to the creation of Cumberland, North Yorkshire, and Westmorland and Furness Unitary authorities.

Council	Seats		Party control		Details
Council	up	of	Previous	New	Details
Amber Valley	15	45	Conservative	Conservative	Details
Basildon	14	42	Conservative	Conservative	Details
Basingstoke and Deane	19	54	Conservative	Conservative	Details
Brentwood	13	37	Conservative	Conservative	Details
Broxbourne	10	30	Conservative	Conservative	Details
Burnley	15	45	No overall control (Labour/Lib Dem coalition)	No overall control (Labour/Lib Dem coalition)	Details
Cambridge	16	42	Labour	Labour	Details
Cannock Chase	13	41	Conservative	Conservative	Details
Castle Point	14	41	Conservative	No overall control (CIIP/PIP coalition)	Details
Cherwell	17	48	Conservative	Conservative	Details
Chorley	14	42	Labour	Labour	Details
Colchester	18	51	No overall control (Conservative/independent coalition)	No overall control (Lib Dem/Labour/Green coalition)	Details
Crawley	12	36	No overall control (Labour/independent coalition)	Labour	Details
Eastleigh	14	39	Liberal Democrats	Liberal Democrats	Details
Elmbridge	16	48	No overall control (Lib Dem/residents coalition)	No overall control (Lib Dem/residents coalition)	Details
Epping Forest	20	58	Conservative	Conservative	Details
Exeter	17	39	Labour	Labour	Details
Harlow	12	33	Conservative	Conservative	Details
Hart	11	33	No overall control (CCH/Lib Dem coalition)	No overall control (CCH/Lib Dem coalition)	Details
Havant	14	38	Conservative	Conservative	Details
Hyndburn	12	35	Labour	No overall control (Labour minority)	Details
Ipswich	17	48	Labour	Labour	Details
Lincoln	11	33	Labour	Labour	Details
Maidstone	18	55	Conservative	Conservative	Details
Mole Valley	14	41	Liberal Democrats	Liberal Democrats	Details
North Hertfordshire	18	49	No overall control (Labour/Lib Dem coalition)	No overall control (Labour/Lib Dem coalition)	Details
Norwich	13	39	Labour	Labour	Details
Pendle	12	33	Conservative	Conservative	Details
Preston	17	48	Labour	Labour	Details
Redditch	11	29	Conservative	Conservative	Details
Reigate and Banstead	15	45	Conservative	Conservative	Details
Rochford	13	39	Conservative	Conservative	Details
Rossendale	12	36	No overall control (Labour minority)	Labour	Details
Rugby	14	42	Conservative	Conservative	Details
Runnymede	14	41	Conservative	Conservative	Details
Rushmoor	13	39	Conservative	Conservative	Details
Stevenage	13	39	Labour	Labour	Details
Tamworth	10	30	Conservative	Conservative	Details
Tandridge	14	42	No overall control (independent/Residents Group Alliance coalition)	No overall control (independent/Residents Group Alliance coalition)	Details
Three Rivers	14	39	Liberal Democrats	Liberal Democrats	Details
Tunbridge Wells	16	48	No overall control (Conservative minority)	No overall control (Lib Dem/Labour/Tunbridge Wells Alliance coalition)	Details
Watford	12	36	Liberal Democrats	Liberal Democrats	Details
Welwyn Hatfield	17	48	Conservative	Conservative	Details
West Lancashire	20	54	No overall control (Labour minority)	No overall control (Labour minority)	Details
West Oxfordshire	16	49	Conservative	No overall control (Lib Dem/Labour/Green coalition)	Details
Winchester	15	45	Liberal Democrats	Liberal Democrats	Details
Woking	10	30	No overall control (Conservative minority)	Liberal Democrats	Details
Worcester	13	35	Conservative	No overall control (Conservative minority)	Details
Worthing	14	37	No overall control (Conservative minority)	Labour	Details
All 49 councils	702	2,026			

=== Unitary authorities ===
==== Election of all councillors ====
Reading Borough Council elected all its councillors elected on new ward boundaries. The new unitary authority Somerset Council held its first election under the old Somerset County Council boundaries, with twice as many councillors being elected as previously. Shadow authorities for the two new unitary authorities replacing Cumbria County Council and its districts were elected, as were councillors for the new North Yorkshire Council ahead of its creation in 2023.

Notably, the count for the Skipton West and West Craven seat ended in a tie between independent candidate Andy Solloway and the Labour candidate Peter Madeley. After various methods for deciding the tie were mooted, including drawing from a deck of cards, the candidates drew straws with Andy Solloway drawing the long straw, thus being declared the winner.

Council	Seats	Party control		Details
Council	Seats	Previous	New	Details
Cumberland	46 (Note: Shadow authority for a unitary council being created in 2023)	No predecessor	Labour	Details
Reading	48	Labour	Labour	Details
North Yorkshire	90	Conservative	Conservative	Details
Somerset	110 (Note: Old boundaries, with twice as many seats as previously)	Conservative	Liberal Democrats	Details
Westmorland and Furness	65	No predecessor	Liberal Democrats	Details
All 5 councils	359			

==== Election of councillors by thirds ====
Unitary authorities that elect councillors in thirds did so in 2022.

Council	Seats		Party control		Details
Council	up	of	Previous	New	Details
Blackburn with Darwen	18	51	Labour	Labour	Details
Derby	17	51	No overall control (Conservative minority)	No overall control (Conservative minority)	Details
Halton	18	54	Labour	Labour	Details
Hartlepool	13	36	No overall control (independent/Conservative coalition)	No overall control (independent/Conservative coalition)	Details
Hull	19	57	Labour	Liberal Democrats	Details
Milton Keynes	19	57	No overall control (Labour/Lib Dem coalition)	No overall control (Labour/Lib Dem coalition)	Details
North East Lincolnshire	16	42	Conservative	Conservative	Details
Peterborough	19	60	No overall control (Conservative minority)	No overall control (Conservative minority)	Details
Plymouth	19	57	No overall control (Conservative minority)	No overall control (Conservative majority after party changes)	Details
Portsmouth	14	42	No overall control (Lib Dem minority)	No overall control (Lib Dem minority)	Details
Slough	14	42	Labour	Labour	Details
Southampton	17	48	Conservative	Labour	Details
Southend-on-Sea	18	51	No overall control (Labour/independent/Lib Dem coalition)	No overall control (Labour/independent/Lib Dem coalition)	Details
Swindon	19	57	Conservative	Conservative	Details
Thurrock	16	49	Conservative	Conservative	Details
Wokingham	18	54	Conservative	No overall control (Lib Dem/Labour/independent coalition)	Details
All 16 councils	274	808			

=== City of London Corporation ===
The Court of Common Council is the main decision-making body of the City of London Corporation, which governs the City of London. The 100 councillors were elected across twenty-five wards. Elections were due on 18 March 2021, but as a result of the coronavirus pandemic were delayed to 23 March 2022.

After 2017 election		Before 2022 election		After 2022 election	
Party	Seats	Party	Seats	Party	Seats
Independent	85	Independent	84	Independent	78
Temple and Farringdon Together	10	Temple and Farringdon Together	10	Temple and Farringdon Together	10
Labour	5	Labour	6	Castle Baynard Independents	7
				Labour	5

=== Mayors ===
There were six local authority mayoral elections and one metropolitan mayoral election.

==== Combined authorities ====
Combined authority	Mayor before	Mayor-elect	Details
South Yorkshire	Dan Jarvis (Labour Co-op)	Oliver Coppard (Labour Co-op)	Details

==== Local authorities ====
Council	Mayor before	Mayor-elect
Croydon	New position	Jason Perry (Con)
Hackney	Philip Glanville (Labour Co-op)	Philip Glanville (Labour Co-op)
Lewisham	Damien Egan (Labour Co-op)	Damien Egan (Labour Co-op)
Newham	Rokhsana Fiaz (Labour Co-op)	Rokhsana Fiaz (Labour Co-op)
Tower Hamlets	John Biggs (Lab)	Luftur Rahman (Aspire)
Watford	Peter Taylor (Lib Dem)	Peter Taylor (Lib Dem)

There was also a referendum in Bristol on whether to continue using the mayor-and-cabinet system or to change to the committee system, with 59% voting to abolish the position of mayor.

== Scotland ==
=== By party ===
By party cumulative results of the 2022 council elections in Scotland
Party	Councillors		Councils	
Party	No.	Change	No.	Change
No overall control	—N/a		27	−2
SNP	453	+22	1	+1
Labour	282	+20	1	+1
Conservatives	214	−63	0	0
Liberal Democrats	87	+20	0	0
Greens	35	+16	0	0
British Unionist	1	+1	0	0
Rubbish	1	0	0	0
West Dunbartonshire Community Party	1	0	0	0
Independents	149	−16	3	0
Total	1,223		32	

=== Councils ===
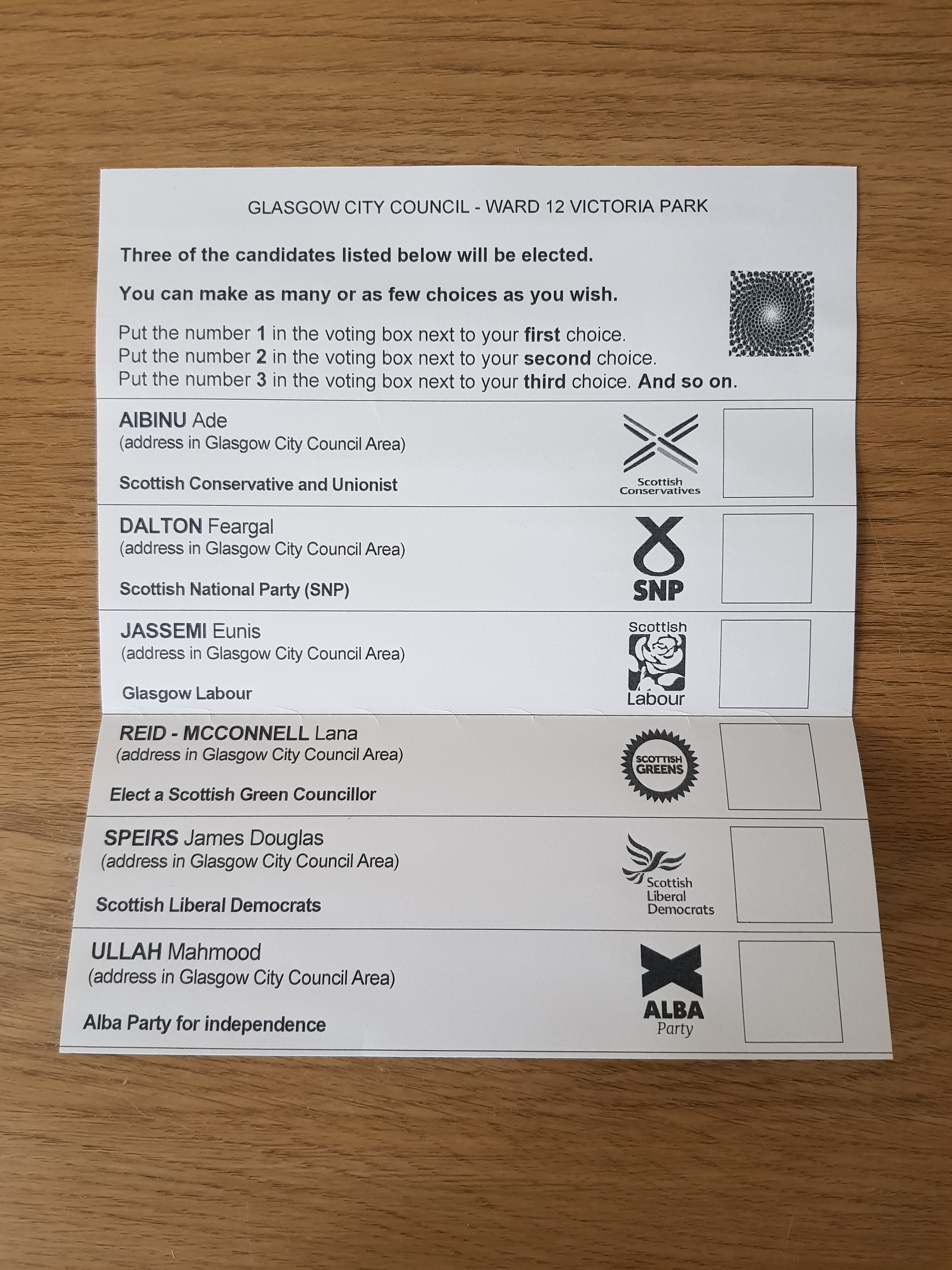
Ballot paper used for the elections in the Victoria Park ward of the Glasgow City Council. The vote is held using the single transferable vote, which allows voters to rank their choices.

Elections were held for all councillors in all 32 local authorities in Scotland. Local elections in Scotland are conducted by the single transferable vote (STV), which results in the number of seats won by each party more proportionally reflecting their share of the vote. As a consequence, local elections in Scotland result more often in no overall control and local authorities being governed by minority or coalition administrations. In this election two of the 32 councils came under one-party majorities: Dundee (SNP) and West Dunbartonshire (Labour).

Council	Seats	Party control		Details
Council	Seats	Previous	New	Details
Aberdeen	45	No overall control (Labour/Conservative/independent coalition)	No overall control (SNP/Lib Dem coalition)	Details
Aberdeenshire	70	No overall control (Conservative/Lib Dem/independent coalition)	No overall control (Conservative/Lib Dem/independent coalition)	Details
Angus	28	No overall control (Lib Dem/Conservative/independent coalition)	No overall control (SNP minority)	Details
Argyll and Bute	36	No overall control (Lib Dem/Conservative/independent coalition)	No overall control (Lib Dem/Conservative/independent coalition)	Details
Clackmannanshire	18	No overall control (SNP minority)	No overall control (SNP minority)	Details
Dumfries and Galloway	43	No overall control (Labour/SNP coalition)	No overall control (Labour/SNP/Lib Dem/independent coalition)	Details
Dundee	29	No overall control (SNP minority)	SNP	Details
East Ayrshire	32	No overall control (SNP minority)	No overall control (SNP minority)	Details
East Dunbartonshire	22	No overall control (Lib Dem/Conservative coalition)	No overall control (SNP minority)	Details
East Lothian	22	No overall control (Labour minority)	No overall control (Labour minority)	Details
East Renfrewshire	18	No overall control (SNP/Labour/Independent coalition)	No overall control (Labour/Independent minority)	Details
Edinburgh	63	No overall control (SNP/Labour coalition)	No overall control (Labour minority)	Details
Falkirk	30	No overall control (SNP minority)	No overall control (SNP minority)	Details
Fife	75	No overall control (SNP/Labour coalition)	No overall control (Labour minority)	Details
Glasgow	85	No overall control (SNP minority)	No overall control (SNP minority)	Details
Highland	74	No overall control (independent/Lib Dem/Labour coalition)	No overall control (SNP/independent coalition)	Details
Inverclyde	22	No overall control (Labour minority)	No overall control (Labour minority)	Details
Midlothian	18	No overall control (Labour minority)	No overall control (SNP minority)	Details
Moray	26	No overall control (SNP minority)	No overall control (Conservative minority)	Details
Na h-Eileanan Siar	29	Independent	Independent	Details
North Ayrshire	33	No overall control (Labour minority)	No overall control (SNP minority)	Details
North Lanarkshire	77	No overall control (Labour minority)	No overall control (SNP minority)	Details
Orkney	21	Independent	Independent	Details
Perth and Kinross	40	No overall control (Conservative/independent coalition)	No overall control (SNP minority)	Details
Renfrewshire	43	No overall control (SNP minority)	No overall control (SNP minority)	Details
Scottish Borders	34	No overall control (Conservative minority)	No overall control (Conservative/independent coalition)	Details
Shetland	23	Independent	Independent	Details
South Ayrshire	28	No overall control (SNP/Labour/independent coalition)	No overall control (Conservative minority)	Details
South Lanarkshire	64	No overall control (SNP minority)	No overall control (Labour minority)	Details
Stirling	23	No overall control (SNP/Labour coalition)	No overall control (Labour minority)	Details
West Dunbartonshire	22	No overall control (SNP minority)	Labour	Details
West Lothian	33	No overall control (Labour minority)	No overall control (Labour minority)	Details
All 32 councils	1,226			

== Wales ==
Elections were held for all councillors in all 22 local authorities as well as for all community council seats in Wales. In all twenty-two councils, the elections were contested under new boundaries. This was the first time Welsh councils could choose between conducting the vote with the current first-past-the-post system or the proportional single transferable vote (STV) system, although practically this will not come into effect until at least 2027, as councils need to give advance notice of such a change.

=== By party ===
By party cumulative results of the 2022 council elections in Wales
Party	Councillors		Councils	
Party	No.	Change	No.	Change
No overall control	—N/a		10	−1
Labour	526	+66	8	+1
Plaid Cymru	202	−6	4	+3
Conservatives	111	−86	0	−1
Liberal Democrats	69	+10	0	0
Greens	8	+8	0	0
Gwlad	1	+1	0	0
Propel	1	+1	0	0
Independents	314	+6	0	−2
Total	1,232		22	

=== Councils ===
Council	Seats	Party control		Details
Council	Seats	Previous	New	Details
Anglesey	35	No overall control (Plaid Cymru/independent coalition)	Plaid Cymru	Details
Blaenau Gwent	33	Independent	Labour	Details
Bridgend	51	No overall control (Labour minority)	Labour	Details
Caerphilly	69	Labour	Labour	Details
Cardiff	79	Labour	Labour	Details
Carmarthenshire	75	No overall control (Plaid Cymru/independent coalition)	Plaid Cymru	Details
Ceredigion	38	No overall control (Plaid Cymru/independent coalition)	Plaid Cymru	Details
Conwy	55	No overall control (Conservative/independent coalition)	No overall control	Details
Denbighshire	48	No overall control (Conservative/independent coalition)	No overall control	Details
Flintshire	66	No overall control (Labour minority)	No overall control	Details
Gwynedd	69	Plaid Cymru	Plaid Cymru	Details
Merthyr Tydfil	30	Independent	No overall control	Details
Monmouthshire	46	Conservative	No overall control	Details
Neath Port Talbot	60	Labour	No overall control	Details
Newport	51	Labour	Labour	Details
Pembrokeshire	60	No overall control (independent/Labour/Plaid Cymru/Lib Dem coalition)	No overall control	Details
Powys	68	No overall control (independent/Conservative coalition)	No overall control	Details
Rhondda Cynon Taf	75	Labour	Labour	Details
Swansea	75	Labour	Labour	Details
Torfaen	40	Labour	Labour	Details
Vale of Glamorgan	54	No overall control (Labour/independent coalition)	No overall control	Details
Wrexham	56	No overall control (independent/Conservative coalition)	No overall control	Details
All 22 councils	1,233			

== Opinion polling ==
=== England ===
Dates conducted	Pollster	Client	Area	Sample size	Con	Lab	Lib Dem	Green	Independent /others	Lead
22–26 Apr	Survation	Good Morning Britain	England	2,587 (Note: Of these respondents, only those "in areas of England where there are local council elections in May 2022" were prompted.)	34%	47%	10%	4%	6%	13%
3 May 2018	2018 local elections (Note: The listed figures are according to Survation, released under its above polling.)				32%	41%	14%	7%	6%	9%

=== Scotland ===
First preference voting intention
Date(s) conducted	Polling organisation/client	Sample size	SNP	Con	Lab	Lib Dem	Green	Alba	Others
5 May 2022	2022 Scottish local elections	N/A	34.1%	19.7%	21.8%	8.6%	6.0%	0.7%	9.2%
29 Apr–3 May 2022	Survation	893	41%	17%	23%	8%	5%	1%	4%
24–28 Mar 2022	Survation/Ballot Box Scotland	1,002	44%	18%	23%	6%	3%	1%	4%
20–26 Oct 2021	Panelbase/Scot Goes Pop	1,001	45%	22%	21%	6%	4%	2%	<1%
4 May 2017	2017 Scottish local elections	1,889,658	32.30%	25.30%	20.16%	6.82%	4.1%	-	10.4%

== Northern Ireland ==
The 2022 election to the Northern Ireland Assembly took place on 5 May 2022.

== See also ==
- 2022 Birmingham Erdington by-election
- 2022 Tiverton and Honiton by-election
- 2022 Wakefield by-election
