= 2022 Broxbourne Borough Council election =

Broxbourne Borough Council election

Results of the election

The 2022 Broxbourne Borough Council election took place on 5 May 2022 to elect members of the Broxbourne Borough Council in England. This was on the same day as other local elections.

== Results summary ==
2022 Broxbourne Borough Council election
Party	This election			Full council			This election		
Party	Seats	Net	Seats %	Other	Total	Total %	Votes	Votes %	+/−
Conservative	9	Steady	90.0	17	26	86.7	10,248	52.4	▼7.1
Labour	1	Steady	10.0	2	3	10.0	5,729	29.3	▲0.8
Green	0	Steady	0.0	0	0	0.0	1,656	8.5	New
Liberal Democrats	0	Steady	0.0	0	0	0.0	1,653	8.5	▼0.4
Independent	0	Steady	0.0	1	1	3.3	214	1.1	New
TUSC	0	Steady	0.0	0	0	0.0	41	0.2	New

== Ward results ==
=== Broxbourne & Hoddesdon South ===
Broxbourne & Hoddesdon South
Party	Candidate	Votes	%	±%
Conservative	Sherrie McDaid	1,445	59.0	▼13.5
Green	Sally Kemp	462	18.9	▲12.9
Labour	Roy Wareham	332	13.6	▲0.1
Liberal Democrats	Kiran Thomas	209	8.5	▲0.5
Majority		983	40.1	▼18.9
Turnout			33.5	▲0.8
Conservative hold		Swing		

=== Cheshunt North ===
Cheshunt North
Party	Candidate	Votes	%	±%
Conservative	Patsy Spears	886	51.6	▼7.6
Labour	Zahra Spencer	583	34.0	▲1.9
Liberal Democrats	Kostas Inchenko	158	9.2	▲0.5
Green	Madela Baddock	90	5.2	New
Majority		303	17.6	▼9.5
Turnout			26.1	▼1.6
Conservative hold		Swing		

=== Cheshunt South & Theobalds ===
Cheshunt South & Theobalds
Party	Candidate	Votes	%	±%
Conservative	Siobhan Monaghan	869	45.1	▼14.3
Labour	Ian Dust	699	36.3	▲3.8
Independent	Cody McCormick	214	11.1	New
Green	Ellie Austen	145	7.5	New
Majority		170	8.8	▼18.1
Turnout			28.2	▼0.3
Conservative hold		Swing		

=== Flamstead End ===
Flamstead End
Party	Candidate	Votes	%	±%
Conservative	Giles Hall	1,101	60.7	▼8.7
Labour	Glynis Evans	435	24.0	▼0.6
Liberal Democrats	Lisa Naylor	140	7.7	▲3.0
Green	Karen Brett	139	7.7	New
Majority		666	36.7	▼8.1
Turnout			27.3	▲1.8
Conservative hold		Swing		

=== Goffs Oak ===
Goffs Oak
Party	Candidate	Votes	%	±%
Conservative	Mark Mills-Bishop	1,114	54.5	▼9.2
Liberal Democrats	Fabio Bonfante	510	24.9	▲6.7
Labour	Mario Angeli	310	15.2	▲2.1
Green	Trevor Griffiths	111	5.4	New
Majority		604	29.6	▼15.9
Turnout			28.5	▲1.0
Conservative hold		Swing		

=== Hoddesdon North ===
Hoddesdon North
Party	Candidate	Votes	%	±%
Conservative	John Perkins	1,312	62.0	▼1.4
Labour	Janet Wareham	464	21.9	▲1.4
Liberal Democrats	Peter Kemp	185	8.7	▲1.0
Green	Sarah Lea	156	7.4	New
Majority		848	40.1	▼2.8
Turnout			29.3	▲1.6
Conservative hold		Swing		

=== Hoddesdon Town & Rye Park ===
Hoddesdon Town & Rye Park
Party	Candidate	Votes	%	±%
Conservative	Andreas Payne	852	52.0	▼0.7
Labour	Jessie Sayce	486	29.7	▼1.0
Green	Roy Clements	170	10.4	New
Liberal Democrats	Timothy Vizer	131	8.0	▲1.6
Majority		366	22.3	▲0.3
Turnout			23.2	▼1.5
Conservative hold		Swing		

=== Rosedale & Bury Green ===
Rosedale & Bury Green
Party	Candidate	Votes	%	±%
Conservative	Yvonne Mobbs	901	51.7	▼12.0
Labour	Beverly Hanshaw	563	32.3	▼4.0
Green	Owen Brett	163	9.4	New
Liberal Democrats	David Payne	116	6.7	New
Majority		338	19.4	▼8.0
Turnout			25.6	▲0.9
Conservative hold		Swing		

=== Waltham Cross ===
Waltham Cross
Party	Candidate	Votes	%	±%
Labour	Carol Bowman	1,255	58.4	▲4.8
Conservative	Corina Gander	653	30.4	▼1.5
Green	Bob Gledhill	104	4.8	New
Liberal Democrats	Sylwia Rossa	95	4.4	▼10.1
TUSC	Christine Thomas	41	1.9	New
Majority		602	28.0	▲6.3
Turnout			26.9	▼2.5
Labour hold		Swing		

=== Wormley & Turnford ===
Wormley & Turnford
Party	Candidate	Votes	%	±%
Conservative	David Taylor	1,115	57.4	▼4.9
Labour	Rosemary Trundell	602	31.0	▲1.9
Green	Rishi Mehta	116	6.0	New
Liberal Democrats	James Stuart	109	5.6	▼3.1
Majority		513	26.4	▼6.8
Turnout			24.8	▲0.5
Conservative hold		Swing		
