= 2022 Havant Borough Council election =

2022 UK local government election

Elections to Havant Borough Council took place on 5 May 2022 as part of the 2022 United Kingdom local elections.

Results map

== Results summary ==
2022 Havant Borough Council election
Party	This election				Full council			This election		
Party	Candidates	Seats	Net	Seats %	Other	Total	Total %	Votes	Votes %	+/−
Conservative	{{{candidates}}}	12	Steady	85.7	24	36	94.7	13,323	48.1	-11.0
Labour	{{{candidates}}}	2	▲1	14.3	0	2	5.3	5,905	21.3	+3.0
Liberal Democrats	{{{candidates}}}	0	▼1	0.0	0	0	0.0	5,302	19.1	+4.3
Green	{{{candidates}}}	0	Steady	0.0	0	0	0.0	3,110	11.2	+3.8
Hampshire Ind.	{{{candidates}}}	0	Steady	0.0	0	0	0.0	65	0.2	-0.2

== Ward results ==
=== Barncroft ===
Barncroft
Party	Candidate	Votes	%	±%
Conservative	Pamela Crellin	403	53.7	−12.5
Labour	Munazza Faiz	199	26.5	+6.3
Liberal Democrats	Flora Ponsonby	94	12.5	−0.1
Green	Reuben Mychaleckyj	54	7.2	N/A
Majority		204	27.2	
Turnout		750	16.4	
Conservative hold		Swing	▼9.4	

=== Battins ===
Battins
Party	Candidate	Votes	%	±%
Conservative	Kristine Tindall	306	34.0	−14.3
Green	Carla Watt	245	27.3	N/A
Liberal Democrats	Johanna Lowe	194	21.6	+8.4
Labour	Richard Brown	89	9.9	−14.9
Hampshire Ind.	Malcolm Carpenter	65	7.2	−6.5
Majority		61	6.7	
Turnout		899	18.6	
Conservative gain from Liberal Democrats		Swing	N/A	

=== Bedhampton ===
Bedhampton
Party	Candidate	Votes	%	±%
Conservative	Anne Fairhurst	1,094	51.4	−0.1
Liberal Democrats	Philippa Gray	648	30.5	−0.8
Labour	Philip Pearson	385	18.1	+8.6
Majority		446	20.9	
Turnout		2,127	28.9	
Conservative hold		Swing	▼0.4	

=== Bondfields ===
Bondfields
Party	Candidate	Votes	%	±%
Conservative	Alexander Rennie	406	40.0	−19.1
Labour	Jason Horton	288	28.3	−1.9
Green	Shelley Saunders	267	26.3	N/A
Liberal Democrats	Maria Mleczko Miller	55	5.4	−4.6
Majority		118	11.7	
Turnout		1,016	20.9	
Conservative hold		Swing	▼8.6	

=== Cowplain ===
Cowplain
Party	Candidate	Votes	%	±%
Conservative	Neil Bowdell	1,284	58.6	−11.1
Labour	John Colman	359	16.4	N/A
Liberal Democrats	Isabelle Fletcher	342	15.6	+3.1
Green	Quentin Wallace-Jones	207	9.4	−7.4
Majority		925	42.2	
Turnout		2,192	29.9	
Conservative hold		Swing	N/A	

=== Emsworth ===
Emsworth
Party	Candidate	Votes	%	±%
Conservative	Richard Kennett	1,656	50.0	−2.0
Liberal Democrats	Claire Snowdon-Darling	884	26.6	+13.5
Green	Anne Sayer	777	23.4	+9.8
Majority		772	23.4	
Turnout		3,319	39.9	
Conservative hold		Swing	▼7.8	

=== Hart Plain ===
Hart Plain
Party	Candidate	Votes	%	±%
Conservative	Carly Scannell	1,097	53.8	−15.7
Labour	Susan Arnold	466	22.9	+4.9
Liberal Democrats	Gregory Pearson	264	13.0	+1.6
Green	Bruce Holman	211	10.4	N/A
Majority		631	30.9	
Turnout		2,038	26.3	
Conservative hold		Swing	▼10.3	

=== Hayling East ===
Hayling East
Party	Candidate	Votes	%	±%
Conservative	Rosemarie Raines	1,136	43.3	−11.8
Labour	Mark Coates	849	32.4	+20.2
Liberal Democrats	William Forrow	414	15.8	−3.7
Green	Natasha Parker	223	8.5	−4.5
Majority		287	10.9	
Turnout		2,622	34.8	
Conservative hold		Swing	▼16.0	

=== Hayling West ===
Hayling West
Party	Candidate	Votes	%	±%
Conservative	Julie Richardson	1,226	47.5	−6.2
Liberal Democrats	Paul Gray	924	35.8	+18.3
Labour	Sheree Earnshaw	322	12.5	−5.1
Green	Richard Lanchester	109	4.2	−5.7
Majority		302	11.7	
Turnout		2,581	38.3	
Conservative hold		Swing	▼12.3	

=== Purbrook ===
Purbrook
Party	Candidate	Votes	%	±%
Conservative	Hasmukh Patel	1,107	51.8	−11.3
Labour	Simon Hagan	426	19.9	+4.3
Liberal Democrats	Adrian Tansom	383	17.9	+6.8
Green	Rosemarie Blackburn	222	10.4	+1.3
Majority		681	31.9	
Turnout		2,138	28.7	
Conservative hold		Swing	▼7.8	

=== St. Faiths ===
St. Faiths
Party	Candidate	Votes	%	±%
Labour	Philip Munday	1,784	55.9	+23.0
Conservative	Jacqueline Branson	965	30.3	−15.6
Green	Sandra Howells	232	7.3	−2.1
Liberal Democrats	Anne Martin	208	6.5	−4.5
Majority		819	25.6	
Turnout		3,189	38.9	
Labour gain from Conservative		Swing	▲19.3	

=== Stakes ===
Stakes
Party	Candidate	Votes	%	±%
Conservative	Sarah Milne	894	52.3	−13.8
Labour	David Hill	433	25.4	+2.3
Liberal Democrats	Antonia Harrison	234	13.7	+3.8
Green	Patrick Bealey	147	8.6	N/A
Majority		461	26.9	
Turnout		1,708	22.4	
Conservative hold		Swing	▼8.1	

=== Warren Park ===
Warren Park
Party	Candidate	Votes	%	±%
Labour	Amy Redsull	305	40.7	+11.0
Conservative	Patrick Hague	301	40.1	−18.5
Green	Peter May	74	9.9	N/A
Liberal Democrats	Michael Bolt	70	9.3	−1.7
Majority		4	0.6	
Turnout		750	15.0	
Labour hold		Swing	▲14.8	

=== Waterloo ===
Waterloo
Party	Candidate	Votes	%	±%
Conservative	Michael Sceal	1,448	60.9	−10.7
Liberal Democrats	Bradley Stuart-James	588	24.7	+11.5
Green	Arthur Plunkett	342	14.4	N/A
Majority		860	36.2	
Turnout		2,378	29.5	
Conservative hold		Swing	▼11.1	
