= 2022 Cherwell District Council election =

2022 UK local government election

← 2021	5 May 2022	2023 →

17 out of 48 seats to Cherwell District Council 25 seats needed for a majority

	First party	Second party	Third party
Leader	Barry Wood	Sean Woodcock	Katherine Tyson
Party	Conservative	Labour	Liberal Democrats
Last election	31 seats, 47.7%	8 seats, 22.8%	3 seats, 15.1%
Seats won	6	4	5
Seats after	25	10	7
Seat change	▼6	▲2	▲4
Popular vote	16,169	10,434	11,120
Percentage	38.4%	24.8%	26.4%
Swing	▼9.3%	▲2.0%	▲11.3%
	Fourth party	Fifth party
Leader		Ian Middleton
Party	Independent	Green
Last election	5 seats, 4.7%	1 seat, 9.7%
Seats won	1	1
Seats after	4	2
Seat change	▼1	▲1
Popular vote	1,092	3,241
Percentage	2.6%	7.7%
Swing	▼2.2%	▼2.0%
- Winner of each seat at the 2022 Cherwell District Council election
Council control before election
Conservative
Council control after election
Conservative

The 2022 Cherwell District Council election was held on 5 May 2022 to elect members of Cherwell District Council in England. This was on the same day as other local elections.

== Results summary ==
2022 Cherwell District Council election
Party	This election			Full council			This election		
Party	Seats	Net	Seats %	Other	Total	Total %	Votes	Votes %	+/−
Conservative	6	▼6	35.3	19	25	52.1	16,169	38.4	-9.3
Labour	4	▲2	23.5	6	10	20.8	10,434	24.8	+2.0
Liberal Democrats	5	▲4	29.4	2	7	14.6	11,120	26.4	+11.3
Independent	1	▼1	5.9	3	4	8.3	1,092	2.6	-2.1
Green	1	▲1	5.9	1	2	4.2	3,241	7.7	-2.0

== Ward results ==
=== Adderbury, Bloxham and Bodicote ===
Adderbury, Bloxham and Bodicote
Party	Candidate	Votes	%	±%
Liberal Democrats	David Hingley	1,801	59.9	+29.7
Conservative	Tony Mepham	902	30.0	−21.9
Labour	Sian Tohill-Martin	305	10.1	−7.8
Majority		899	29.9	
Turnout		3,008	40.5	
Liberal Democrats gain from Conservative		Swing	▲25.8	

=== Banbury Calthorpe and Easington ===
Banbury Calthorpe and Easington
Party	Candidate	Votes	%	±%
Conservative	Ian Harwood	1,320	46.7	−9.2
Labour	Isabel Creed	1,207	42.7	+19.2
Liberal Democrats	Robert Pattenden	301	10.6	+4.2
Majority		113	4.0	
Turnout		2,828	33.1	
Conservative hold		Swing	▼14.2	

=== Banbury Cross and Neithrop ===
Banbury Cross and Neithrop
Party	Candidate	Votes	%	±%
Labour	Chuk Okeke	1,103	50.8	+5.6
Conservative	Fiaz Ahmed	769	35.4	−2.8
Liberal Democrats	Ash Haeger	300	13.8	+9.1
Majority		334	15.4	
Turnout		2,172	29.5	
Labour hold		Swing	▲4.2	

=== Banbury Grimsbury and Hightown ===
Banbury Grimsbury and Hightown
Party	Candidate	Votes	%	±%
Labour Co-op	Rebecca Biegel	1,158	56.5	+8.3
Conservative	Ben Dalton	556	27.1	−8.1
Green	Karl Kwiatkowski	176	8.6	−2.1
Liberal Democrats	David Yeomans	159	7.8	+1.9
Majority		602	29.4	
Turnout		2,049	29.0	
Labour Co-op hold		Swing	▲8.2	

=== Banbury Hardwick ===
Banbury Hardwick
Party	Candidate	Votes	%	±%
Labour	Andrew Crichton	798	43.2	+9.7
Conservative	Tony Ilott	717	38.8	−8.7
Green	Alison Nuttall	182	9.9	+3.5
Liberal Democrats	Andrew Raisbeck	150	8.1	+4.9
Majority		81	4.4	
Turnout		1,847	25.2	
Labour gain from Conservative		Swing	▲9.2	

=== Banbury Ruscote ===
Banbury Ruscote
Party	Candidate	Votes	%	±%
Labour	Amanda Watkins	922	55.7	+4.1
Conservative	Hayne Strangwood	562	33.9	−3.0
Liberal Democrats	Steve Buckwell	172	10.4	+6.1
Majority		360	21.8	
Turnout		1,656	23.7	
Labour hold		Swing	▲3.6	

=== Bicester East ===
Bicester East
Party	Candidate	Votes	%	±%
Conservative	Donna Ford	947	48.0	−1.0
Green	Damien Maguire	544	27.6	+4.4
Labour	Samuel Akbur	483	24.5	+5.4
Majority		403	20.4	
Turnout		1,974	31.5	
Conservative hold		Swing	▼2.7	

=== Bicester North and Caversfield ===
Bicester North and Caversfield
Party	Candidate	Votes	%	±%
Conservative	Nick Mawer	797	40.9	−11.8
Labour	Arjunsingh Bais	546	28.0	+7.3
Liberal Democrats	Simon Lytton	386	19.8	+7.5
Green	Amanda Maguire	218	11.2	−3.2
Majority		251	12.9	
Turnout		1,947	30.0	
Conservative hold		Swing	▼9.6	

=== Bicester South and Ambrosden ===
Bicester South and Ambrosden
Party	Candidate	Votes	%	±%
Liberal Democrats	Christopher Pruden	1,732	55.4	+43.1
Conservative	Sundeep Singh	982	31.4	−21.3
Labour	Sian Roscoe	412	12.3	−7.5
Majority		750	24.0	
Turnout		3,126	33.5	
Liberal Democrats gain from Conservative		Swing	▲32.2	

=== Bicester West ===
Bicester West
Party	Candidate	Votes	%	±%
Independent	John Broad	1,092	52.3	−10.9
Conservative	Sam Holland	615	29.4	+10.0
Labour	Steven Uttley	382	18.3	+5.3
Majority		477	22.9	
Turnout		2,089	31.9	
Independent hold		Swing	▼10.5	

=== Cropredy, Sibfords and Wroxton ===
Cropredy, Sibfords and Wroxton
Party	Candidate	Votes	%	±%
Conservative	Phil Chapman	1,396	49.8	−15.5
Liberal Democrats	Xenia Huntley	707	25.2	N/A
Labour Co-op	Anne Cullen	701	25.0	+4.9
Majority		689	24.6	
Turnout		2,804	40.8	
Conservative hold		Swing	N/A	

=== Deddington ===
Deddington
Party	Candidate	Votes	%	±%
Conservative	Eddie Reeves	1,416	45.9	−11.7
Labour	Annette Murphy	690	22.4	+1.3
Liberal Democrats	James Hartley	640	20.7	−0.6
Green	Aaron Bliss	339	11.0	N/A
Majority		726	23.5	
Turnout		3,085	41.7	
Conservative hold		Swing	▼6.5	

=== Fringford and Heyfords ===
Fringford and Heyfords
Party	Candidate	Votes	%	±%
Conservative	Barry Wood	1,066	42.5	−17.6
Liberal Democrats	Dillie Keane	508	20.3	N/A
Labour	Sylvia Howells	474	18.9	+3.3
Green	Jenny Tamblyn	460	18.3	−6.0
Majority		558	22.2	
Turnout		2,508	35.6	
Conservative hold		Swing	N/A	

=== Kidlington East ===
Kidlington East
Party	Candidate	Votes	%	±%
Green	Fiona Mawson	1,322	46.8	+12.3
Conservative	Nigel Simpson	1,070	37.9	−12.6
Labour	Sarah Stephenson-Hunter	432	15.3	+0.4
Majority		252	8.9	
Turnout		2,824	40.2	
Green gain from Conservative		Swing	▲12.5	

=== Kidlington West ===
Kidlington West
Party	Candidate	Votes	%	±%
Liberal Democrats	Jean Conway	1,465	52.4	+2.2
Conservative	Helen Kingsley	1,005	36.0	−2.5
Labour	Chidi Uche	325	11.6	+0.3
Majority		460	16.4	
Turnout		2,795	40.3	
Liberal Democrats hold		Swing	▲2.4	

=== Launton and Otmoor ===
Launton and Otmoor (2 seats due to by-election)
Party	Candidate	Votes	%	±%
Liberal Democrats	Gemma Coton	1,477	55.3	+19.4
Liberal Democrats	Angus Patrick	1,322	49.5	+13.6
Conservative	David Hughes	1,091	40.8	−9.0
Conservative	Steve Jackson	958	35.9	−13.9
Labour	Joanne Howells	267	10.0	−4.3
Labour	Naomi Karslake	229	8.6	−5.7
Turnout			43.7	
Liberal Democrats gain from Conservative		Swing		
Liberal Democrats gain from Conservative		Swing		

== Changes 2022–2023 ==
Hannah Banfield, elected in 2019 as a Labour councillor for Banbury Cross and Neithrop ward, resigned from the party in November 2022, sitting instead as an independent.
