= 2022 Slough Borough Council election =

2022 UK local government election

← 2021	5 May 2022	2023 →

14 seats to Slough Borough Council 22 seats needed for a majority
- Results of the 2022 Slough Borough Council election

The 2022 Slough Borough Council election took place on 5 May 2022 to elect members of Slough Borough Council in England. This was on the same day as other local elections.

== Results summary ==
2022 Slough Borough Council election
Party	This election			Full council			This election		
Party	Seats	Net	Seats %	Other	Total	Total %	Votes	Votes %	+/−
Labour	12	▼1	85.7	21	33	78.6	14,851	57.7	+0.1
Conservative	2	▲1	14.3	4	6	14.3	7,789	30.3	±0.0
Independent	0	Steady	0.0	3	3	7.1	682	2.7	-3.9
Liberal Democrats	0	Steady	0.0	0	0	0.0	1,586	6.2	+3.1
Green	0	Steady	0.0	0	0	0.0	525	2.0	-0.1
Ind. Network	0	Steady	0.0	0	0	0.0	147	0.6	N/A
Heritage	0	Steady	0.0	0	0	0.0	138	0.5	+0.3

== Ward results ==
=== Baylis and Stoke ===
Baylis and Stoke
Party	Candidate	Votes	%	±%
Labour Co-op	Fiza Matloob	1,912	88.8	+5.6
Conservative	Osa-Samson Isere	240	11.2	−5.6
Majority		1,672	77.6	
Turnout		2,152	32.5	
Labour Co-op hold		Swing	▲5.6	

=== Britwell and Northborough ===
Britwell and Northborough
Party	Candidate	Votes	%	±%
Labour Co-op	Robert Anderson	1,128	72.9	+6.0
Conservative	Teresa Fletcher	419	27.1	+2.0
Majority		709	45.8	
Turnout		1,547	23.2	
Labour Co-op hold		Swing	▲2.0	

=== Central ===
Central
Party	Candidate	Votes	%	±%
Labour	Safdar Ali	1,151	63.7	−9.1
Independent	Tom King	387	21.4	N/A
Conservative	Gurcharan Manku	268	14.8	−12.3
Majority		764	42.3	
Turnout		1,806	23.0	
Labour hold		Swing	N/A	

=== Chalvey ===
Chalvey
Party	Candidate	Votes	%	±%
Labour	Shaida Akbar	1,209	74.1	+0.9
Conservative	Ivon Sampson	212	13.0	−13.8
Green	Sridhar Bachu	210	12.9	N/A
Majority		997	61.1	
Turnout		1,631	22.8	
Labour hold		Swing	▲7.4	

=== Cippenham Green ===
Cippenham Green
Party	Candidate	Votes	%	±%
Labour Co-op	Roger Davis	1,022	58.3	+3.1
Conservative	Mherunisa Hussain	593	33.8	−8.2
Heritage	Nick Smith	138	7.9	+5.0
Majority		429	24.5	
Turnout		1,753	24.8	
Labour Co-op hold		Swing	▲5.7	

=== Cippenham Meadows ===
Cippenham Meadows
Party	Candidate	Votes	%	±%
Labour	Dilbagh Parmar	1,036	55.2	−0.3
Liberal Democrats	Matthew Taylor	441	23.5	+7.8
Conservative	Michelle Little	401	21.4	−7.4
Majority		595		
Turnout		1,878	24.1	
Labour hold		Swing	▼4.1	

=== Colnbook with Poyle ===
Colnbook with Poyle
Party	Candidate	Votes	%	±%
Conservative	Puja Bedi	661	51.6	−1.8
Labour	Avtar Cheema	619	48.4	+1.8
Majority		42	3.2	
Turnout		1,280	30.0	
Conservative gain from Labour		Swing	▼1.8	

=== Farnham ===
Farnham
Party	Candidate	Votes	%	±%
Labour	Muhammad Sabah	1,168	68.8	−2.2
Conservative	Aman Grewal	529	31.2	+13.9
Majority		639	37.6	
Turnout		1,697	24.5	
Labour hold		Swing	▼8.1	

=== Elliman ===
Elliman
Party	Candidate	Votes	%	±%
Labour	Mushtaq Malik	830	50.4	−26.6
Liberal Democrats	Amjad Abbasi	502	30.5	N/A
Conservative	Jarnail Ruprah	315	19.1	−3.9
Majority		328	19.9	
Turnout		1,647	25.8	
Labour hold		Swing	N/A	

=== Haymill and Lynch Hill ===
Haymill and Lynch Hill
Party	Candidate	Votes	%	±%
Conservative	Anna Wright	872	46.7	−9.1
Labour	Raf Zarait	686	36.8	−7.4
Liberal Democrats	Catharine Parkes	308	16.5	N/A
Majority		186	9.9	
Turnout		1,866	26.4	
Conservative hold		Swing	▼0.9	

=== Langley Kedermister ===
Langley Kedermister
Party	Candidate	Votes	%	±%
Labour Co-op	Preston Brooker	850	44.0	+1.9
Conservative	Sharon O'Reilly	695	36.0	−7.6
Independent	Dawinderpal Sahota	295	15.3	N/A
Green	Tammer Salem	91	4.7	+1.6
Majority		155	8.0	
Turnout		1,931	29.9	
Labour Co-op hold		Swing	▲4.8	

=== Langley St. Mary's ===
Langley St. Mary's
Party	Candidate	Votes	%	±%
Labour Co-op	Harj Minhas	1,007	44.2	−1.6
Conservative	Christine Bamigbola	902	39.6	−4.5
Green	Julian Edmonds	224	9.8	−0.4
Ind. Network	Jibril Hassan	147	6.4	N/A
Majority		105	4.6	
Turnout		2,280	30.5	
Labour Co-op hold		Swing	▲1.5	

=== Upton ===
Upton
Party	Candidate	Votes	%	±%
Labour	Balvinder Bains	1,210	53.6	+3.3
Conservative	Neel Rana	714	31.6	+0.2
Liberal Democrats	Josephine Hanney	335	14.8	+1.7
Majority		496	22.0	
Turnout		2,259	31.9	
Labour hold		Swing	▲1.6	

=== Wexham Lea ===
Wexham Lea
Party	Candidate	Votes	%	±%
Labour Co-op	Haqeeq Dar	1,023	51.4	+7.7
Conservative	Mubashir Ahmed	968	48.6	+32.0
Majority		55	2.8	
Turnout		1,991	28.9	
Labour Co-op hold		Swing	▼12.2	
