= 2022 Sandwell Metropolitan Borough Council election =

2022 UK local government election

Map of the results

The 2022 Sandwell Metropolitan Borough Council election took place on 5 May 2022 to elect members of Sandwell Metropolitan Borough Council. This was on the same day as other local elections. 24 of the 72 seats were up for election.

== Background ==
Sandwell is a consistently Labour council. Labour have held majorities every election since its creation in 1973, apart from 1978 when the Conservatives gained the council. From 2018 to 2021, Sandwell was one of the few councils to be comprised fully of 1 party, with Labour in control of all 72 wards. In the 2021 election, Labour lost 9 seats with 53.1% of the vote, the Conservatives gained 9 with 36.6%, and independents did not make any gains or losses with 4.6% of the vote.

The seats up for election this year were last elected in 2018. In that election, Labour won all seats with 68.5% of the vote, giving them full control of the council. The Conservatives won 24.4%.

== Previous council composition ==
After 2021 election		Before 2022 election	
Party	Seats	Party	Seats
Labour	58	Labour	59
Conservative	9	Conservative	9
Independent	4	Independent	1
Sandwell Together	0	Sandwell Together	2

Changes:

- November 2021: Rajbir Singh (Labour) resigns from council; seat left vacant until 2022 election
- January 2022: Ian Chambers joins Labour from the Conservatives
- April 2022: Iqbal Singh Padda joins Conservatives from Labour
- Independent councillors Yvonne Davies and Joanne Hadley form Sandwell Together

== Results ==
2022 Sandwell Metropolitan Borough Council election
Party	This election			Full council			This election		
Party	Seats	Net	Seats %	Other	Total	Total %	Votes	Votes %	+/−
Labour	21	▼3	87.5	40	61	84.7	34,847	57.5	+4.4
Conservative	3	▲3	12.5	6	9	13.9	20,881	34.4	-2.2
Independent	0	Steady	0.0	2	2	1.4	2,137	3.5	N/A
Liberal Democrats	0	Steady	0.0	0	0	0.0	2,146	3.5	+1.0
TUSC	0	Steady	0.0	0	0	0.0	302	0.5	+0.2
Reform UK	0	Steady	0.0	0	0	0.0	203	0.3	-0.6
For Britain	0	Steady	0.0	0	0	0.0	74	0.1	±0.0
Yeshua	0	Steady	0.0	0	0	0.0	38	0.1	±0.0

== Results by ward ==
An asterisk indicates an incumbent councillor.

=== Abbey ===
Abbey
Party	Candidate	Votes	%	±%
Labour	Bob Piper	2,328	84.6	+16.2
Conservative	Mona Khurana	424	15.4	−0.4
Majority		1,904	69.2	▲16.5
Turnout		2,809	33.13	▼3.83
Labour hold		Swing		

=== Blackheath ===
Blackheath
Party	Candidate	Votes	%	±%
Labour	Danny Millard	1,053	51.6	−5.1
Conservative	Greg Allman	986	48.4	+5.1
Majority		67	3.2	▼10.2
Turnout		2,053	22.26	▼4.5
Labour hold		Swing		

=== Bristnall ===
Bristnall
Party	Candidate	Votes	%	±%
Labour	Amolak Dhariwal	1,203	49.5	−2.3
Conservative	Fajli Bibi	938	38.6	+0.5
Reform UK	Peter Durnell	150	6.2	N/A
Liberal Democrats	Manjit Lall	139	5.7	+1.5
Majority		265	10.9	▼2.8
Turnout		2,445	26.72	▼2.2
Labour hold		Swing		

=== Charlemont with Grove Vale ===
Charlemont with Grove Vale
Party	Candidate	Votes	%	±%
Conservative	Les Trumpeter	1,449	51.1	−2.9
Labour	Jennifer Hemmingway	1,099	38.7	+0.7
Liberal Democrats	Sadie Smith	163	5.7	+3.0
For Britain	Sam Harding	74	2.6	+0.5
Reform UK	Graham Nock	53	1.9	+0.1
Majority		350	12.4	▼3.6
Turnout		2,851	30.19	▼5.7
Conservative gain from Labour		Swing		

=== Cradley Heath and Old Hill ===
Cradley Heath and Old Hill
Party	Candidate	Votes	%	±%
Labour	Julie Webb	1,324	58.0	+9.8
Conservative	Fahmida Yasmin	680	29.8	−16.0
Liberal Democrats	Nicholas Bradley	220	9.6	N/A
TUSC	Cammilla Mngaza	60	2.6	+1.0
Majority		644	28.2	▲25.8
Turnout		2,306	21.96	▼3.0
Labour hold		Swing		

=== Friar Park ===
Friar Park
Party	Candidate	Votes	%	±%
Labour	Simon Hackett	1,094	55.9	+17.1
Conservative	Ryan Trumpeter	825	42.2	−9.4
Yeshua	Colin Rankine	38	1.9	±0.0
Majority		269	13.7	n/a
Turnout		1,958	21.98	▲0.2
Labour hold		Swing		

=== Great Barr with Yew Tree ===
Great Barr with Yew Tree
Party	Candidate	Votes	%	±%
Labour	Steve Melia	1,335	47.1	+10.5
Conservative	Connor Jones	1,169	41.2	−6.1
Liberal Democrats	Mark Smith	331	11.7	+3.3
Majority		166	5.9	n/a
Turnout		2,845	28.58	▼3.6
Labour hold		Swing		

=== Great Bridge ===
Great Bridge
Party	Candidate	Votes	%	±%
Labour	Soyfur Rahman	1,123	51.3	+4.4
Conservative	Craig Adams	1,067	48.7	+1.0
Majority		56	2.6	n/a
Turnout		2,208	22.4	▼1.1
Labour hold		Swing		

=== Greets Green and Lyng ===
Greets Green and Lyng
Party	Candidate	Votes	%	±%
Labour	John Giles	1,676	63.2	+6.4
Conservative	Iqbal Padda	974	36.8	+9.1
Majority		1,002	26.4	▼2.7
Turnout		2,668	28.08	▼3.5
Labour gain from Conservative		Swing		

=== Hateley Heath ===
Hateley Heath
Party	Candidate	Votes	%	±%
Labour	Paul Moore	1,550	62.0	+11.7
Conservative	Yesmeen Singh	951	38.0	−5.6
Majority		599	24.0	▲17.3
Turnout		2,529	24.55	▼4.0
Labour hold		Swing		

=== Langley ===
Langley
Party	Candidate	Votes	%	±%
Labour	Bill Gavan	1,113	51.8	+4.6
Conservative	Sharon Davies	788	36.7	+8.3
Liberal Democrats	Clive Heywood	248	11.5	N/A
Majority		325	15.1	▼3.7
Turnout		2,161	22.47	▼3.1
Labour hold		Swing		

=== Newton ===
Newton
Party	Candidate	Votes	%	±%
Labour	Keith Allcock	1,500	58.5	+17.3
Conservative	Mujakkir Ahmed	782	30.5	−4.9
Liberal Democrats	Amanda Jenkins	284	11.1	+5.6
Majority		718	28.0	▲22.2
Turnout		2,590	29.35	▼4.6
Labour hold		Swing		

=== Old Warley ===
Old Warley
Party	Candidate	Votes	%	±%
Labour	Harnoor Bhullar	1,372	48.8	+11.5
Conservative	Mo Sakhi	1,100	39.1	+11.1
Liberal Democrats	Bob Smith	342	12.2	+4.5
Majority		272	9.7	
Turnout		2,834	30.55	▼2.5
Labour hold		Swing		

=== Oldbury ===
Oldbury
Party	Candidate	Votes	%	±%
Labour	Nagi Singh	1,579	59.1	−4.9
Conservative	Abdul Qayyum	924	34.6	+3.5
TUSC	Richard Gingell	167	6.3	+1.5
Majority		655	24.5	▼8.4
Turnout		2,686	26.09	▼5.5
Labour hold		Swing		

=== Princes End ===
Princes End
Party	Candidate	Votes	%	±%
Conservative	David Wilkes	856	50.9	+2.2
Labour	Jenny Chidley	825	49.1	+17.5
Majority		31	1.8	▼15.3
Turnout		1,694	17.91	▼1.9
Conservative gain from Labour		Swing		

=== Rowley ===
Rowley
Party	Candidate	Votes	%	±%
Labour	Claire Mayo	1,070	50.8	+5.4
Conservative	Wendy Steed	1,038	49.2	−5.4
Majority		32	1.6	
Turnout		2,138	21.83	▼3.6
Labour gain from Conservative		Swing		

=== Smethwick ===
Smethwick
Party	Candidate	Votes	%	±%
Labour	Ashley Lewis	1,968	72.9	+3.9
Conservative	Satinder Dunn	731	27.1	+8.4
Majority		1,237	45.8	▼5.5
Turnout		2,721	27.58	▼3.2
Labour hold		Swing		

=== Soho and Victoria ===
Soho and Victoria
Party	Candidate	Votes	%	±%
Labour	Mohammed Uddin	1,781	53.7	−16.4
Independent	Mohammad Rouf	970	29.3	N/A
Conservative	Jasbir Ranie	349	10.5	−2.2
Liberal Democrats	Daisy Shone	214	6.5	−0.7
Majority		811	24.4	▼43.0
Turnout		3,353	30.55	▼1.9
Labour gain from Independent		Swing		

=== St. Paul's ===
St. Paul's
Party	Candidate	Votes	%	±%
Labour	Aqeela Choudhry	2,863	83.0	+1.5
Conservative	Imran Qureshi	382	11.1	−3.4
Liberal Democrats	Keith Wilmot	205	5.9	+1.9
Majority		2,481	71.9	▲4.9
Turnout		3,470	32.94	▼4.5
Labour hold		Swing		

=== Tipton Green ===
Tipton Green
Party	Candidate	Votes	%	±%
Labour	Abid Hussain	1,319	44.5	−1.3
Independent	Richard Jeffcoat	1,167	39.4	+5.7
Conservative	Steve Emms	476	16.1	−4.4
Majority		149	5.1	▼7.0
Turnout		2,970	27.53	▼0.1
Labour hold		Swing		

=== Tividale ===
Tividale
Party	Candidate	Votes	%	±%
Conservative	Amrita Dunn	1,094	51.1	+4.1
Labour	Robert Hevican	1,046	48.9	−4.1
Majority		48	2.2	▼7.4
Turnout		2,149	23.25	▲3.5
Conservative hold		Swing		

=== Wednesbury North ===
Wednesbury North
Party	Candidate	Votes	%	±%
Labour	Luke Giles	1,233	53.3	+2.2
Conservative	Marc Lucock	1,005	43.5	+0.5
TUSC	Gareth Knox	75	3.2	+1.9
Majority		228	9.8	▲1.6
Turnout		2,331	25.1	▼1.5
Labour hold		Swing		

=== Wednesbury South ===
Wednesbury South
Party	Candidate	Votes	%	±%
Labour	Ian Chambers	1,409	57.6	+21.9
Conservative	Vijay Gaddu	1,036	42.4	+6.7
Majority		373	15.2	
Turnout		2,464	23.87	▼7.0
Labour hold		Swing		

=== West Bromwich Central ===
West Bromwich Central
Party	Candidate	Votes	%	±%
Labour	Liam Preece	1,984	69.8	+12.8
Conservative	Aran Duggal	857	30.2	−3.3
Majority		1,127	39.6	▲16.2
Turnout		2,863	27.86	▼4.4
Labour hold		Swing		
