= 2022 Three Rivers District Council election =

2022 UK local government election

- 5 May 2022

14 of 39 seats to Three Rivers District Council 20 seats needed for a majority
| | First party | Second party | Third party |
|---|---|---|---|
| Party | Liberal Democrats | Conservative | Labour |
| Seats before | 23 | 11 | 3 |
- Map showing the results of the 2022 Three Rivers District Council election. Liberal Democrats in amber, Conservatives in blue, Labour in red, Greens in green.
Leader before election
Sarah Nelmes
Liberal Democrats
Leader after election
Sarah Nelmes
Liberal Democrats

An election to Three Rivers District Council took place on 5 May 2022. 14 of the 39 seats were up for election. The election took place alongside other local elections across the United Kingdom.

== Background ==
Result of the council election when these seats were last contested in 2018

Result of the most recent council election in 2021

The seats up for election in 2022 were those last contested in the 2018 election, when the Liberal Democrats won eight seats, the Conservatives won four seats, and Labour won one seat. The Gade Valley ward elected two councillors in 2022 instead of one, due to the resignation of Independent (elected as a Liberal Democrat) councillor Alex Michaels in March 2022.

Following the elections of May 2022, Three Rivers District Council is controlled by the Liberal Democrats, who hold 23 of the 39 seats.

== Electoral process ==
Three Rivers District Council is elected in thirds, with a third of all seats up for election every year for three years, with an election to Hertfordshire County Council instead in the fourth year. The election took place by first-past-the-post voting, with wards represented by three councillors, with one elected in each election year to serve a four-year term.

== Council composition ==
| After 2021 election | | Before 2022 election | | After 2022 election | |
|---|---|---|---|---|---|
| Liberal Democrats | 23 | Liberal Democrats | 23 | Liberal Democrats | 23 |
| Conservative | 11 | Conservative | 11 | Conservative | 12 |
| Labour | 3 | Labour | 3 | Labour | 3 |
| Independent | 2 | Independent | 1 | Green | 1 |
| | | Vacant | 1 | | |

== Summary ==
=== Election result ===
2022 Three Rivers District Council election
| Party | This election | | | | Full council | | | This election | | |
| Party | Candidates | Seats | Net | Seats % | Other | Total | Total % | Votes | Votes % | +/− |
|---|---|---|---|---|---|---|---|---|---|---|
| Liberal Democrats | {{{candidates}}} | 8 | ▼1 | 57.1 | 15 | 23 | 59.0 | 11,326 | 43.5 | +5.3 |
| Conservative | {{{candidates}}} | 4 | Steady | 28.6 | 8 | 12 | 30.8 | 8,300 | 31.9 | –5.7 |
| Labour | {{{candidates}}} | 1 | Steady | 7.1 | 2 | 3 | 7.7 | 3,657 | 14.0 | +1.4 |
| Green | {{{candidates}}} | 1 | ▲1 | 7.1 | 0 | 1 | 2.6 | 2,690 | 10.3 | +0.4 |
| UK Voice | {{{candidates}}} | 0 | Steady | 0.0 | 0 | 0 | 0.0 | 66 | 0.3 | N/A |

== Ward results ==
Candidates seeking re-election are marked with an asterisk (*).

=== Abbots Langley and Bedmond ===
Abbots Langley and Bedmond
| Party | Candidate | Votes | % | ±% |
|---|---|---|---|---|
| Liberal Democrats | Sara Bedford* | 1,070 | 57.3 | ▲0.1 |
| Conservative | Andrew O'Brien | 435 | 23.3 | ▼0.5 |
| Labour | James Farrington | 238 | 12.7 | ▲0.4 |
| Green | Michael Rayment | 124 | 6.6 | ▲3.1 |
| Majority | | 635 | 34.0 | ▲0.6 |
| Turnout | | 1,867 | 32.2 | ▼6.0 |
| Liberal Democrats hold | | Swing | ▲0.3 | |

=== Carpenders Park ===
Carpenders Park
| Party | Candidate | Votes | % | ±% |
|---|---|---|---|---|
| Conservative | Rue Grewal | 870 | 49.9 | ▼11.9 |
| Labour | William Waite | 410 | 23.5 | ▲2.1 |
| Liberal Democrats | Christopher Rice | 312 | 17.9 | ▲1.2 |
| Green | Kelsey Trevett | 84 | 4.8 | New |
| UK Voice | Kajalbala Usadadiya | 66 | 3.8 | New |
| Majority | | 460 | 26.4 | ▼14.0 |
| Turnout | | 1,742 | 28.5 | ▼8.4 |
| Conservative hold | | Swing | ▼7.0 | |

=== Chorleywood North and Sarratt ===
Chorleywood North and Sarratt
| Party | Candidate | Votes | % | ±% |
|---|---|---|---|---|
| Conservative | Philip Hearn | 1,112 | 55.5 | ▼18.6 |
| Liberal Democrats | Louise Price | 649 | 32.4 | ▲16.0 |
| Green | Peter Loader | 131 | 6.5 | New |
| Labour | Margaret Gallagher | 110 | 5.5 | ▼1.9 |
| Majority | | 463 | 23.1 | ▼34.5 |
| Turnout | | 2,002 | 28.9 | ▼4.3 |
| Conservative hold | | Swing | ▼17.3 | |

=== Chorleywood South and Maple Cross ===
Chorleywood South and Maple Cross
| Party | Candidate | Votes | % | ±% |
|---|---|---|---|---|
| Liberal Democrats | Martin Trevett* | 1,251 | 53.4 | ▲3.2 |
| Conservative | Zenab Hearn | 755 | 32.3 | ▼4.5 |
| Green | Roger Stafford | 176 | 7.5 | ▲1.4 |
| Labour | Iain Roden | 159 | 6.8 | ▼0.1 |
| Majority | | 496 | 21.2 | ▲7.8 |
| Turnout | | 2,341 | 34.4 | ▼4.4 |
| Liberal Democrats hold | | Swing | ▲3.9 | |

=== Dickinsons ===
Dickinsons
| Party | Candidate | Votes | % | ±% |
|---|---|---|---|---|
| Green | Chris Mitchell | 1,128 | 45.7 | New |
| Liberal Democrats | Margaret Hofman* | 1,057 | 42.8 | ▼6.1 |
| Conservative | Sam Benson | 215 | 8.7 | ▼25.6 |
| Labour | Jeni Swift Gillett | 69 | 2.8 | ▼11.9 |
| Majority | | 71 | 2.9 | N/A |
| Turnout | | 2,469 | 42.9 | ▲5.1 |
| Green gain from Liberal Democrats | | Swing | ▲25.9 | |

=== Durrants ===
Durrants
| Party | Candidate | Votes | % | ±% |
|---|---|---|---|---|
| Liberal Democrats | Steve Drury* | 1,316 | 64.3 | ▲7.3 |
| Conservative | Rupert Barnes | 381 | 18.6 | ▼4.1 |
| Green | Andrew Gallagher | 220 | 10.7 | ▲5.1 |
| Labour | John Grillo | 131 | 6.4 | ▼6.0 |
| Majority | | 935 | 45.7 | ▲11.4 |
| Turnout | | 2,048 | 35.8 | ▼0.0 |
| Liberal Democrats hold | | Swing | ▲5.7 | |

=== Gade Valley ===
Gade Valley (2 seats)
| Party | Candidate | Votes | % | ±% |
|---|---|---|---|---|
| Liberal Democrats | Khalid Hussain | 772 | 51.0 | ▲4.9 |
| Liberal Democrats | Jon Tankard* | 763 | 50.4 | ▲4.3 |
| Conservative | Vicky Edwards | 349 | 23.0 | ▼1.3 |
| Conservative | Hitesh Tailor | 282 | 18.6 | ▼5.7 |
| Labour | Bruce Prochnik | 278 | 18.3 | ▲3.6 |
| Labour | Maureen Sedlacek | 243 | 16.0 | ▲1.3 |
| Green | Emma Brading | 172 | 11.4 | ▲3.8 |
| Majority | | 414 | 27.3 | ▲5.4 |
| Turnout | | 1,515 | 30.0 | ▼1.3 |
| Liberal Democrats hold | | Swing | | |
| Liberal Democrats hold | | Swing | | |

=== Leavesden ===
Leavesden
| Party | Candidate | Votes | % | ±% |
|---|---|---|---|---|
| Liberal Democrats | Kevin Raeburn | 1,042 | 57.2 | ▲3.3 |
| Conservative | Pankaj Bagul | 396 | 21.7 | ▲1.6 |
| Labour | Marie-Louise Nolan | 293 | 16.1 | ▲0.1 |
| Green | Bruce Perry | 92 | 5.0 | New |
| Majority | | 646 | 35.4 | ▲1.7 |
| Turnout | | 1,823 | 26.7 | ▼4.2 |
| Liberal Democrats hold | | Swing | ▲0.8 | |

=== Moor Park and Eastbury ===
Moor Park and Eastbury
| Party | Candidate | Votes | % | ±% |
|---|---|---|---|---|
| Conservative | Abbas Merali | 1,120 | 68.4 | ▼8.7 |
| Liberal Democrats | Laura Thompson | 286 | 17.5 | ▲4.3 |
| Labour | Mashkoor Khan | 130 | 7.9 | ▼1.7 |
| Green | Dominic Pennicott | 101 | 6.2 | New |
| Majority | | 834 | 50.9 | ▼13.0 |
| Turnout | | 1,637 | 29.7 | ▼1.3 |
| Conservative hold | | Swing | ▼6.5 | |

=== Oxhey Hall and Hayling ===
Oxhey Hall and Hayling
| Party | Candidate | Votes | % | ±% |
|---|---|---|---|---|
| Liberal Democrats | Anne Winter | 1,103 | 58.3 | ▲14.0 |
| Labour | Clare Leahy | 357 | 18.9 | ▼5.1 |
| Conservative | Mary Sangster | 355 | 18.8 | ▼6.9 |
| Green | Mary Chabrel | 77 | 4.1 | ▲1.7 |
| Majority | | 746 | 39.4 | N/A |
| Turnout | | 1,892 | 31.2 | ▼2.8 |
| Liberal Democrats hold | | Swing | ▲9.5 | |

=== Penn and Mill End ===
Penn and Mill End
| Party | Candidate | Votes | % | ±% |
|---|---|---|---|---|
| Liberal Democrats | Sarah Nelmes* | 906 | 51.4 | ▲3.0 |
| Conservative | Mike Sims | 593 | 33.7 | ▼1.2 |
| Labour | Martin Waldron | 162 | 9.2 | ▼1.3 |
| Green | Deesha Chandra | 100 | 5.7 | ▼0.5 |
| Majority | | 313 | 17.8 | ▲4.3 |
| Turnout | | 1,761 | 29.9 | ▼3.8 |
| Liberal Democrats hold | | Swing | ▲2.1 | |

=== Rickmansworth Town ===
Rickmansworth Town
| Party | Candidate | Votes | % | ±% |
|---|---|---|---|---|
| Conservative | Andrea Fraser | 1,062 | 47.2 | ▼10.6 |
| Liberal Democrats | Tom Smith | 729 | 32.4 | ▲18.5 |
| Labour | Janet Cullen | 251 | 11.2 | ▲1.4 |
| Green | Dmitri Macmillen | 209 | 9.3 | ▼7.2 |
| Majority | | 333 | 14.8 | N/A |
| Turnout | | 2,251 | 34.3 | ▼8.2 |
| Conservative hold | | Swing | ▼14.6 | |

=== South Oxhey ===
South Oxhey
| Party | Candidate | Votes | % | ±% |
|---|---|---|---|---|
| Labour | Stephen King* | 826 | 61.3 | ▼1.2 |
| Conservative | Christopher Alley | 375 | 27.8 | ▲7.1 |
| Green | Chris Lawrence | 76 | 5.6 | ▲3.9 |
| Liberal Democrats | Rhys Southall | 70 | 5.2 | ▲0.6 |
| Majority | | 451 | 33.5 | ▼8.4 |
| Turnout | | 1,347 | 23.4 | ▼2.1 |
| Labour hold | | Swing | ▼4.2 | |
