= 2022 Halton Borough Council election =

2022 UK local government election

Results of the 2022 Halton Borough Council election

The 2022 Halton Borough Council election took place on 5 May 2022, alongside other local elections in the United Kingdom, to elect a third of the council's 54 seats. The Labour Party won most of the 18 seats up for election, comfortably retaining their overall majority. Only one seat switched hands: Daresbury, Moore and Sandymoor elected a Conservative, a loss for the Green Party who were left without any members on the council.

== Results summary ==
2022 Halton Borough Council election
Party	This election				Full council			This election		
Party	Candidates	Seats	Net	Seats %	Other	Total	Total %	Votes	Votes %	+/−
Labour	18	16	Steady	88.9	32	48	88.9	14,973	64.2	
Conservative	17	1	▲1	5.6	2	3	5.6	4,125	17.7	
Liberal Democrats	8	1	Steady	5.6	2	3	5.6	2,245	9.6	
Green	6	0	▼1	0.0	0	0	0.0	1,211	5.2	
Independent	7	0	Steady	0.0	0	0	0.0	757	3.2	

== Ward results ==
An asterisk (*) next to a candidate's name indicates that they were an incumbent councillor.

=== Appleton ===
Appleton
Party	Candidate	Votes	%	±%
Labour	Angela Teeling *	865	84.6	+28.5
Conservative	Duncan Harper	157	15.4	−4.7
Turnout				
Labour hold		Swing		

=== Bankfield ===
Bankfield
Party	Candidate	Votes	%	±%
Labour	Laura Bevan *	938	86.8	+28.2
Independent	Keith McCann	87	8.0	N/A
Conservative	David Dorian	56	5.2	−21.6
Turnout				
Labour hold		Swing		

=== Beechwood and Heath ===
Beechwood and Heath
Party	Candidate	Votes	%	±%
Liberal Democrats	Gareth Stockton *	997	47.9	+13.9
Labour	Craig Butcher	625	30.0	+0.6
Conservative	Daniel Clarke	365	17.5	−7.0
Independent	Rhona Bentley	93	4.5	−0.5
Turnout				
Liberal Democrats hold		Swing		

=== Birchfield ===
Birchfield
Party	Candidate	Votes	%	±%
Labour	Michael Fry *	885	49.9	+4.0
Conservative	John Powell	665	37.5	−6.2
Liberal Democrats	Andrew Teebay	118	6.7	−6.2
Green	Matthew Healey	106	6.0	N/A
Turnout				
Labour hold		Swing		

=== Bridgewater ===
Bridgewater
Party	Candidate	Votes	%	±%
Labour	Emma Garner	1,024	74.6	+23.9
Conservative	Dylan Eaton	202	14.7	−10.1
Liberal Democrats	Suzanne Howard	147	10.7	−8.8
Turnout				
Labour hold		Swing		

=== Central and West Bank ===
Central and West Bank
Party	Candidate	Votes	%	±%
Labour	Noel Hutchinson *	633	85.7	+29.9
Conservative	Colleen Harper	106	14.3	−3.9
Turnout				
Labour hold		Swing		

=== Daresbury, Moore and Sandymoor ===
Daresbury, Moore and Sandymoor
Party	Candidate	Votes	%	±%
Conservative	Sian Davidson	399	34.1	−3.5
Labour	Anna Hutchinson	398	34.1	+8.1
Green	Richard Kinchin	372	31.8	−7.4
Turnout		1,168		
Conservative gain from Green		Swing		

The election was a dead heat between the Conservative and Labour candidates, with both getting 398 votes. The election was decided by the drawing of names from an envelope, with the Conservative candidate winning.

=== Ditton, Hale Village and Halebank ===
Ditton, Hale Village and Halebank
Party	Candidate	Votes	%	±%
Labour	Marie Wright *	946	80.2	+25.8
Conservative	Philip Harper	234	19.8	−6.1
Turnout				
Labour hold		Swing		

=== Farnworth ===
Farnworth
Party	Candidate	Votes	%	±%
Labour	Valerie Hill *	1,033	64.8	+19.1
Conservative	Ann Dawson	561	35.2	−2.1
Turnout				
Labour hold		Swing		

=== Grange ===
Grange
Party	Candidate	Votes	%	±%
Labour	Mark Dennett *	790	78.2	+28.9
Liberal Democrats	Jonathan Howard	220	21.8	+7.4
Turnout				
Labour hold		Swing		

=== Halton Castle ===
Halton Castle
Party	Candidate	Votes	%	±%
Labour	Christopher Carlin *	713	63.0	+11.5
Green	Iain Ferguson	197	17.4	N/A
Independent	Darrin Whyte	134	11.8	−9.7
Conservative	Peter Heatley	87	7.7	−13.4
Turnout				
Labour hold		Swing		

=== Halton Lea ===
Halton Lea
Party	Candidate	Votes	%	±%
Labour	Alan Lowe *	851	75.8	+18.9
Conservative	Sandra Davidson	130	11.6	−8.8
Green	Ashlee Brown	86	7.7	N/A
Liberal Democrats	Laura Hodge	56	5.0	−9.9
Turnout				
Labour hold		Swing		

=== Halton View ===
Halton View
Party	Candidate	Votes	%	±%
Labour	Louise Nolan	1,000	80.1	+31.5
Conservative	Julie Powell	248	19.9	−5.2
Turnout				
Labour hold		Swing		

=== Highfield ===
Highfield
Party	Candidate	Votes	%	±%
Labour	Robert Gilligan *	965	74.9	+10.3
Conservative	James Powell	178	13.8	−9.4
Independent	Steven Dowdeswell	145	11.3	N/A
Turnout				
Labour hold		Swing		

=== Hough Green ===
Hough Green
Party	Candidate	Votes	%	±%
Labour	Philip Harris *	887	72.5	+26.4
Conservative	Lyn Nguzo	212	17.3	−10.0
Green	Tracy Miller	124	10.1	−5.4
Turnout				
Labour hold		Swing		

=== Mersey and Weston ===
Mersey and Weston
Party	Candidate	Votes	%	±%
Labour	Norman Plumpton-Walsh *	803	56.7	+18.1
Liberal Democrats	Linda Redhead	352	24.9	+1.8
Conservative	Daniel Baker	164	11.6	−9.4
Independent	Gillian Rowe	96	6.8	N/A
Turnout				
Labour hold		Swing		

=== Norton North ===
Norton North
Party	Candidate	Votes	%	±%
Labour	Geoffrey Logan *	806	46.9	+10.2
Green	Gary Cargill	326	19.0	+0.1
Liberal Democrats	Diane Inch	276	16.1	−14.0
Conservative	Peter Davidson	187	10.9	−17.6
Independent	Graham Porter	123	7.2	N/A
Turnout				
Labour hold		Swing		

=== Norton South and Preston Brook ===
Norton South and Preston Brook
Party	Candidate	Votes	%	±%
Labour	Martha Lloyd Jones *	811	71.0	+21.2
Conservative	Adam Burnett	174	15.2	−8.3
Liberal Democrats	Miriam Hodge	79	6.9	−9.8
Independent	Craig Wyna	79	6.9	−9.1
Turnout				
Labour hold		Swing		
