= 2022 Worthing Borough Council election =

2022 UK local government election

- 5 May 2022

14 out of 37 seats to Worthing Borough Council 19 seats needed for a majority

	First party	Second party
Party	Labour	Conservative
Last election	15 seats, 34.6%	19 seats, 44.8%
Seats before	17	17
Seats won	10	4
Seats after	23	13
Seat change	▲6	▼4
Popular vote	15,201	11,998
Percentage	46.5%	36.7%
Swing	▲11.9%	▼8.1%
	Third party	Fourth party
Party	Liberal Democrats	Green
Last election	3 seats, 10.8%	0 seats, 9.6%
Seats before	2	0
Seats won	0	0
Seats after	1	0
Seat change	▼1	Steady
Popular vote	2,239	3,241
Percentage	6.8%	9.9%
Swing	▼4.0%	▲0.3%
- Winner of each seat at the 2022 Worthing Borough Council election
Council control before election
Conservative
Council control after election
Labour

The 2022 Worthing Borough Council election took place on 5 May 2022 to elect members of Worthing Borough Council, on the same day as other UK local elections.

The Labour Party won control of the council for the first time, ending 18 years of Conservative administration.

== Ward results ==
=== Broadwater ===
Broadwater
Party	Candidate	Votes	%	±%
Labour	Margaret Howard	1,450	59.0	+13.7
Conservative	Paisley Thomson	667	27.1	−12.8
Green	Richard Battson	173	7.0	−0.6
Liberal Democrats	John Apsey	168	6.8	+0.2
Majority		783	31.9	
Turnout			36	
Labour hold		Swing		

=== Castle ===
Castle
Party	Candidate	Votes	%	±%
Labour	Ibsha Choudhury	1,297	54.5	+16.0
Labour	Samuel Theodoridi	1,060	44.6	+6.1
Conservative	Nicky Waight	696	29.3	−12.6
Conservative	Habib Shashaty	658	27.7	−14.2
Liberal Democrats	Nick Wiltshire	287	12.1	+1.0
Liberal Democrats	Robin Rogers	281	11.8	+0.7
Green	Christopher Smith	188	7.9	−0.1
Majority		364	15.3	
Turnout			34	
Labour gain from Conservative		Swing		
Labour gain from Conservative		Swing		

=== Central ===
Central
Party	Candidate	Votes	%	±%
Labour	Jim Deen	1,591	60.5	+16.3
Conservative	Josh Harris	613	23.3	−6.6
Green	Jo Paul	212	8.1	−9.7
Liberal Democrats	Christine Brown	169	6.4	−0.5
Freedom Alliance	Christopher Woodward	46	1.7	N/A
Majority		978	37.2	
Turnout			34	
Labour hold		Swing		

=== Durrington ===
Durrington
Party	Candidate	Votes	%	±%
Conservative	Charles James	674	47.8	−7.4
Labour	Graham McKnight	513	36.4	+14.5
Liberal Democrats	Emma Norton	223	15.8	+1.0
Majority		161	11.4	
Turnout			32	
Conservative hold		Swing		

=== Gaisford ===
Gaisford
Party	Candidate	Votes	%	±%
Labour	Dale Overton	1,686	57.4	+15.1
Conservative	Bryan Turner	854	29.1	−9.0
Green	Stephen Carleysmith	218	7.4	−2.3
Liberal Democrats	Michael Donin	180	6.1	−2.8
Majority		832	28.3	
Turnout			42	
Labour gain from Conservative		Swing		

=== Goring ===
Goring
Party	Candidate	Votes	%	±%
Conservative	Kevin Jenkins	1,347	43.8	−17.1
Green	Sonya Mallin	1,000	32.5	+23.0
Labour	Bruce Taylor	726	23.6	+3.1
Majority		347	11.3	
Turnout			45	
Conservative hold		Swing		

=== Heene ===
Heene
Party	Candidate	Votes	%	±%
Labour	Richard Mulholland	1,333	53.5	+10.3
Conservative	Syed Ahmed	883	35.4	−1.2
Green	Ian Davey	276	11.1	−2.6
Majority		450	18.1	
Turnout			38	
Labour hold		Swing		

=== Marine ===
Marine
Party	Candidate	Votes	%	±%
Labour	Andy Whight	1,595	53.6	+7.0
Conservative	Edward Crouch	1,144	38.5	−3.9
Green	Julie Dawe	236	7.9	+2.1
Majority		451	15.1	
Turnout			45	
Labour gain from Conservative		Swing		

=== Northbrook ===
Northbrook
Party	Candidate	Votes	%	±%
Labour	Mike Barrett	561	44.6	+15.1
Conservative	Sean McDonald	547	43.5	−7.0
Liberal Democrats	Keith Sunderland	149	11.9	+1.7
Majority		14	1.1	
Turnout			25	
Labour gain from Conservative		Swing		

=== Offington ===
Offington
Party	Candidate	Votes	%	±%
Conservative	Nigel Morgan	1,364	53.8	−10.9
Labour	Helen Abrahams	843	33.3	+17.2
Green	Steve Rhodes	327	12.9	+3.6
Majority		521	20.5	
Turnout			39	
Conservative hold		Swing		

=== Salvington ===
Salvington
Party	Candidate	Votes	%	±%
Conservative	Heather Mercer	1,351	52.8	−6.2
Labour	Lysanne Skinner	882	34.5	+17.3
Green	Melanie Ling	325	12.7	+4.1
Majority		469	18.3	
Turnout			36	
Conservative hold		Swing		

=== Selden ===
Selden
Party	Candidate	Votes	%	±%
Labour	Dan Hermitage	1,455	60.3	+13.9
Conservative	Keith Bickers	685	28.4	−6.9
Green	Clare Marshall	144	6.0	−3.4
Liberal Democrats	Yvonne Leonard	130	5.4	−0.3
Majority		770	31.9	
Turnout			39	
Labour hold		Swing		

=== Tarring ===
Tarring
Party	Candidate	Votes	%	±%
Labour	Rita Garner	1,269	49.2	+23.9
Liberal Democrats	Iona Harte	652	25.3	−13.2
Conservative	John Salisbury	515	20.0	−6.4
Green	Karen Brooks	142	5.5	−1.4
Majority		617	23.9	
Turnout			40	
Labour gain from Liberal Democrats		Swing		
