= 2022 Rugby Borough Council election =

2022 UK local government election

Map of the results

The 2022 Rugby Borough Council election took place on 5 May 2022 to elect members of Rugby Borough Council in England. This was on the same day as other local elections.

== Results summary ==
2022 Rugby Borough Council election
Party	This election			Full council			This election		
Party	Seats	Net	Seats %	Other	Total	Total %	Votes	Votes %	+/−
Conservative	6	▼2	42.9	17	23	54.8	9,970	37.9	-10.7
Labour	5	▲2	35.7	5	10	23.8	8,963	34.0	+6.8
Liberal Democrats	3	Steady	21.4	6	9	21.4	5,837	22.2	+6.4
Green	0	Steady	0.0	0	0	0.0	1,535	5.8	-2.5
Libertarian	0	Steady	0.0	0	0	0.0	33	0.1	±0.0

== Ward results ==
=== Admirals and Cawston ===
Admirals and Cawston
Party	Candidate	Votes	%	±%
Labour	Michael Moran	1,220	51.5	+21.0
Conservative	Dale Keeling	812	34.3	−12.3
Liberal Democrats	Isabelle McKenzie	204	8.6	−6.1
Green	Richard Brook	132	5.6	−2.5
Majority		408	17.2	
Turnout		2,368	34.9	
Labour gain from Conservative		Swing	▲16.7	

=== Benn ===
Benn
Party	Candidate	Votes	%	±%
Labour	Richard Harrington	962	62.8	+10.3
Conservative	Rachel Lowe	313	20.4	−6.9
Green	Angela Dunne	256	16.7	+3.7
Majority		649	42.4	
Turnout		1,531	26.3	
Labour hold		Swing	▲8.6	

=== Bilton ===
Bilton
Party	Candidate	Votes	%	±%
Conservative	Toby Lawrence	900	41.5	−12.7
Liberal Democrats	Stephen Pimm	688	31.7	+10.2
Labour	Mark Gore	441	20.4	+3.1
Green	Laura Clarke	138	6.4	−0.5
Majority		212	9.8	
Turnout		2,167	42.6	
Conservative hold		Swing	▼11.5	

=== Coton and Boughton ===
Coton and Boughton
Party	Candidate	Votes	%	±%
Labour	Alison Livesey	780	42.0	+8.3
Conservative	Jill Simpson-Vince	753	40.5	−9.5
Liberal Democrats	Edward Blackburn	159	8.6	+1.3
Green	Mawgan Stinchcombe	132	7.1	+0.2
Libertarian	Jamie Pullin	33	1.8	−0.2
Majority		27	1.5	
Turnout		1,857	32.5	
Labour gain from Conservative		Swing	▲8.9	

=== Dunsmore ===
Dunsmore
Party	Candidate	Votes	%	±%
Conservative	Deepah Roberts	1,239	49.6	−18.3
Liberal Democrats	Jonathan Bennet	807	32.3	N/A
Labour	Kieran Brown	454	18.2	−1.7
Majority		432	17.4	
Turnout		2,500	37.9	
Conservative hold		Swing	N/A	

=== Eastlands ===
Eastlands
Party	Candidate	Votes	%	±%
Liberal Democrats	Sam Edwards	958	49.4	+7.2
Labour	Ben Gladwin	453	23.4	+1.6
Conservative	Heidi Thomas	398	20.5	−7.2
Green	Becca Stevenson	129	6.7	−1.4
Majority		505	26.0	
Turnout		1,938	35.7	
Liberal Democrats hold		Swing	▲2.8	

=== Hillmorton ===
Hillmorton
Party	Candidate	Votes	%	±%
Conservative	Ian Picker	889	45.6	−13.7
Labour	Audrey Rooney-Ellis	765	39.3	+13.1
Liberal Democrats	Julie Douglas	295	15.1	+6.2
Majority		124	6.3	
Turnout		1,949	34.2	
Conservative hold		Swing	▼13.4	

=== New Bilton ===
New Bilton
Party	Candidate	Votes	%	±%
Labour	John Slinger	803	58.9	+7.0
Conservative	Christopher Johnson	377	27.7	−7.6
Green	Maralyn Pickup	183	13.4	+0.5
Majority		426	31.2	
Turnout		1,363	25.7	
Labour hold		Swing	▲7.3	

=== Newbold and Brownsover ===
Newbold and Brownsover
Party	Candidate	Votes	%	±%
Labour	Ram Srivastava	918	55.1	+10.1
Conservative	Joel Srodon	541	32.5	−15.9
Green	Mark Summers	207	12.4	N/A
Majority		377	22.6	
Turnout		1,666	26.5	
Labour hold		Swing	▲13.0	

=== Paddox ===
Paddox
Party	Candidate	Votes	%	±%
Liberal Democrats	Noreen New	1,198	56.1	+11.0
Conservative	Bella Leathley	445	20.8	−12.1
Labour	Chris Mawby	381	17.8	+1.6
Green	Bob Beggs	111	5.2	−0.5
Majority		753	35.3	
Turnout		2,135	38.5	
Liberal Democrats hold		Swing	▲11.6	

=== Revel and Binley Woods ===
Revel and Binley Woods
Party	Candidate	Votes	%	±%
Conservative	Belinda Garcia	1,232	64.1	−5.4
Labour	Jonathan Vickers	690	35.9	+15.8
Majority		542	28.2	
Turnout		1,922	37.8	
Conservative hold		Swing	▼10.6	

=== Rokeby and Overslade ===
Rokeby and Overslade
Party	Candidate	Votes	%	±%
Liberal Democrats	Bill Lewis	1,432	65.7	+15.6
Conservative	Alex Osiatynski	422	19.4	−10.0
Labour	Sarah Feeney	325	14.9	−0.1
Majority		1,010	46.3	
Turnout		2,179	37.3	
Liberal Democrats hold		Swing	▲12.8	

=== Wolston and The Lawfords ===
Wolston and The Lawfords
Party	Candidate	Votes	%	±%
Conservative	Simon Ward	1,079	53.9	−4.7
Labour	Philip Burns	579	28.9	+7.0
Green	Lesley Summers	247	12.3	−7.2
Liberal Democrats	Hussein Tafazzal	96	4.8	N/A
Majority		500	25.0	
Turnout		2,001	33.3	
Conservative hold		Swing	▼5.9	

=== Wolvey and Shilton ===
Wolvey and Shilton
Party	Candidate	Votes	%	±%
Conservative	Becky Maoudis	570	74.8	−0.2
Labour	Christopher Lee	192	25.2	+0.2
Majority		378	49.6	
Turnout		762	38.0	
Conservative hold		Swing	▼0.1	
