= 2022 Mole Valley District Council election =

2022 UK local government election

Results of the 2022 Mole Valley District Council election (Liberal Democrats in orange, Conservatives in blue, and Ashtead Independents in salmon)

The 2022 Mole Valley District Council election took place on 5 May 2022 to elect one-third of Mole Valley District Council members in England.

== Results summary ==
2022 Mole Valley District Council election
Party	This election			Full council			This election		
Party	Seats	Net	Seats %	Other	Total	Total %	Votes	Votes %	+/−
Liberal Democrats	8	▲2	57.1	16	24	58.5	11,070	45.3	+8.4
Conservative	3	▼2	21.4	7	10	24.4	7,910	32.3	-5.8
Ashtead Ind.	3	Steady	21.4	4	7	17.1	2,977	12.2	-0.4
Green	0	Steady	0.0	0	0	0.0	1,507	6.2	±0.0
Labour	0	Steady	0.0	0	0	0.0	889	3.6	-2.3
Independent	0	Steady	0.0	0	0	0.0	107	0.4	N/A

== Ward results ==
=== Ashtead Common ===
Ashtead Common
Party	Candidate	Votes	%	±%
Ashtead Ind.	Patricia Wiltshire	828	61.1	-2.2
Conservative	Gavin Newton	202	14.9	−4.1
Liberal Democrats	Roland Hogg	201	14.8	+5.7
Green	Jo Sherring	125	9.2	N/A
Majority		626	46.2	
Turnout		1,356	43.0	
Ashtead Ind. hold		Swing	▲1.0	

=== Ashtead Park ===
Ashtead Park
Party	Candidate	Votes	%	±%
Ashtead Ind.	Garry Stansfield	906	64.1	+9.4
Conservative	Stephen Connor	366	25.9	−1.8
Liberal Democrats	Leonard Rugina	142	10.0	+2.4
Majority		540	38.2	
Turnout		1,414	41.3	
Ashtead Ind. hold		Swing	▲5.6	

=== Ashtead Village ===
Ashtead Village
Party	Candidate	Votes	%	±%
Ashtead Ind.	Alan Reilly	1,243	62.9	+4.2
Conservative	Peter Crooks	321	16.2	−5.1
Liberal Democrats	Philippa Shimmin	245	12.4	+4.3
Labour	Susan Gilchrist	167	8.5	+1.6
Majority		922	46.7	
Turnout		1,976	42.2	
Ashtead Ind. hold		Swing	▲4.7	

=== Bookham North ===
Bookham North
Party	Candidate	Votes	%	±%
Liberal Democrats	Monica Weller	1,420	60.6	+20.3
Conservative	Richard Moyse	785	33.5	−16.0
Green	John Roche	139	5.9	+0.5
Majority		635	27.1	
Turnout		2,344	50.2	
Liberal Democrats gain from Conservative		Swing	▲18.2	

=== Bookham South ===
Bookham South
Party	Candidate	Votes	%	±%
Liberal Democrats	Elizabeth Daly	1,347	61.1	+17.4
Conservative	Mary Huggins	718	32.6	−14.4
Green	Molly Crook	139	6.3	+1.3
Majority		629	28.5	
Turnout		2,204	48.7	
Liberal Democrats hold		Swing	▲15.9	

=== Brockham, Betchworth and Buckland ===
Brockham, Betchworth and Buckland
Party	Candidate	Votes	%	±%
Conservative	Simon Budd	969	57.7	+20.7
Liberal Democrats	Mike Hebberd	522	31.1	−14.7
Green	Christopher Crook	122	7.3	−7.8
Labour	Leo Nassakau	66	3.9	+1.9
Majority		447	26.6	
Turnout		1,679	47.1	
Conservative hold		Swing	▲17.7	

=== Capel, Leigh and Newdigate ===
Capel, Leigh and Newdigate
Party	Candidate	Votes	%	±%
Liberal Democrats	Charls Engel	808	48.7	−2.2
Conservative	Corrina Osborne-Patterson	739	44.5	+8.8
Green	Lisa Scott	112	6.8	+2.8
Majority		69	4.2	
Turnout		1,659	48.9	
Liberal Democrats gain from Conservative		Swing	▼5.5	

=== Dorking North ===
Dorking North
Party	Candidate	Votes	%	±%
Liberal Democrats	David Draper	881	56.9	−2.7
Green	Holland Weston	330	21.3	+8.5
Conservative	Paul Austin	245	15.8	−5.2
Labour	Samuel Cockle-Hearne	93	6.0	−0.7
Majority		551	35.6	
Turnout		1,549	44.4	
Liberal Democrats hold		Swing	▼5.6	

=== Dorking South ===
Dorking South
Party	Candidate	Votes	%	±%
Liberal Democrats	Margaret Cooksey	1,505	61.4	+5.5
Conservative	Austin Kesseiri	446	18.2	−7.1
Green	Lucy Barford	314	12.8	+1.3
Labour Co-op	Kev Stroud	187	7.6	+0.3
Majority		1,059	43.2	
Turnout		2,452	43.3	
Liberal Democrats hold		Swing	▲6.3	

=== Fetcham East ===
Fetcham East
Party	Candidate	Votes	%	±%
Conservative	Tim Hall	779	58.7	−1.9
Liberal Democrats	Christine Miller	440	33.2	+7.7
Green	Susan McGrath	108	8.1	−1.8
Majority		339	25.5	
Turnout		1,327	43.1	
Conservative hold		Swing	▼4.8	

=== Fetcham West ===
Fetcham West
Party	Candidate	Votes	%	±%
Liberal Democrats	Raj Haque	1,035	65.8	+7.6
Conservative	Stephen Conisbee	539	34.2	−5.1
Majority		496	31.6	
Turnout		1,574	49.4	
Liberal Democrats hold		Swing	▲6.4	

=== Holmwoods ===
Holmwoods
Party	Candidate	Votes	%	±%
Liberal Democrats	Clayton Wellman	997	60.2	+9.6
Conservative	Leslie Maruziva	546	33.0	−4.0
Labour	Christine Foster	114	6.9	+1.0
Majority		451	27.2	
Turnout		1,657	35.5	
Liberal Democrats hold		Swing	▲6.8	

=== Leatherhead North ===
Leatherhead North
Party	Candidate	Votes	%	±%
Liberal Democrats	Josie Brinker	988	54.3	+7.2
Conservative	Paul Purcelll	578	31.8	−9.7
Labour Co-op	James Stringer	145	8.0	−3.4
Independent	Jessica Moram	107	5.9	N/A
Majority		410	22.5	
Turnout		1,818	33.3	
Liberal Democrats hold		Swing	▲8.5	

=== Leatherhead South ===
Leatherhead South
Party	Candidate	Votes	%	±%
Conservative	Joanna Slater	677	46.7	−9.8
Liberal Democrats	Gareth Parsons	539	37.1	+12.0
Green	Melissa Awcock	118	8.1	−0.7
Labour Co-op	Ann Clark	117	8.1	−1.4
Majority		138	9.6	
Turnout		1,451	42.8	
Conservative hold		Swing	▼10.9	
