= 2022 Tandridge District Council election =

2022 UK local government election

Map of the results of the 2022 Tandridge District Council election. Independents in grey, Liberal Democrats in yellow, Oxted & Limpsfield Residents in green and Conservatives in blue. Wards in white were not contested in 2022.

The 2022 Tandridge District Council election took place on 5 May 2022 to elect members of Tandridge District Council in Surrey, England. One third of the council was up for election and the council remained in no overall control.

== Election result ==
Tandridge local election result 2022
Party	Seats	Gains	Losses	Net gain/loss	Seats %	Votes %	Votes	+/−
Liberal Democrats	5	1	0	▲1	35.7	21.1	4,106	▲1.0
Independent	5	2	0	▲2	35.7	21.1	4,096	▲6.1
Residents	3	0	0	Steady	21.4	18.7	3,629	▲1.3
Conservative	1	0	3	▼3	7.1	29.5	5,735	▼6.1
Labour	0	0	0	Steady	0.0	8.5	1,643	▼0.2
Green	0	0	0	Steady	0.0	1.1	210	New

== Ward results ==
=== Bletchingley and Nutfield ===
Bletchingley and Nutfield
Party	Candidate	Votes	%	±%
Independent	Chris Pinard	712	40.9	New
Conservative	Ian Borman	507	29.1	▼20.5
Liberal Democrats	Richard Fowler	258	14.8	▼2.3
Labour	Linda Baharier	150	8.6	▼2.8
Green	Jack Baart	115	6.6	New
Majority		205	11.8	N/A
Turnout		1,742	38.9	▲3.6
Independent gain from Conservative		Swing		

=== Burstow, Horne & Outwood ===
Burstow, Horne & Outwood
Party	Candidate	Votes	%	±%
Independent	Sue Farr	722	48.1	New
Conservative	Charlie Pilkington	459	30.6	▼7.9
Labour	Stephen Case-Green	156	10.4	▲3.8
Green	Elliott de Boer	95	6.3	New
Liberal Democrats	Sam Howson	70	4.7	▲1.2
Majority		263	17.5	N/A
Turnout		1,510	31.2	▼7.0
Independent hold		Swing		

=== Dormansland & Felcourt ===
Dormansland & Felcourt
Party	Candidate	Votes	%	±%
Independent	Nicholas White	585	49.3	▲5.2
Conservative	Harry Baker-Smith	434	36.6	▼6.5
Liberal Democrats	Roger Martin	120	10.1	▲2.8
Labour	Emba Jones	48	4.0	▼1.4
Majority		151	12.7	▲11.7
Turnout		1,192	39.0	▲0.5
Independent hold		Swing		

=== Godstone ===
Godstone
Party	Candidate	Votes	%	±%
Independent	Chris Farr	991	61.9	▼3.7
Conservative	Keith Ward	333	20.8	▼0.5
Labour	Paul Ryan	185	11.5	▲4.1
Liberal Democrats	Martin Redman	93	5.8	Steady
Majority		658	41.1	▼3.2
Turnout		1,609	35.5	▼8.9
Independent hold		Swing		

=== Harestone ===
Harestone
Party	Candidate	Votes	%	±%
Liberal Democrats	Annette Evans	721	55.2	▲19.4
Conservative	Jeremy Webster	524	40.1	▼11.3
Labour	Anne Watson	61	4.7	▼5.3
Majority		197	15.1	N/A
Turnout		1,313	41.1	▼0.3
Liberal Democrats gain from Conservative		Swing		

=== Limpsfield ===
Limpsfield
Party	Candidate	Votes	%	±%
Residents	Ian Booth	850	65.4	▲1.1
Conservative	Beverley Connolly	266	20.5	▼8.6
Liberal Democrats	Rupert McCann	125	9.6	▲5.5
Labour	Angie Horrigan	58	4.5	▲2.0
Majority		584	44.9	▲9.7
Turnout		1,300	45.4	▼5.1
Residents hold		Swing		

=== Lingfield & Crowhurst ===
Lingfield & Crowhurst
Party	Candidate	Votes	%	±%
Independent	Katie Montgomery	558	44.0	New
Conservative	Mark Ridge	544	42.9	▲0.2
Labour	Fern Warwick-Ching	89	7.0	▼4.7
Liberal Democrats	Dave Wilkes	76	6.0	▼6.2
Majority		14	1.1	N/A
Turnout		1,271	38.4	▲0.1
Independent gain from Conservative		Swing		

=== Oxted North & Tandridge ===
Oxted North & Tandridge
Party	Candidate	Votes	%	±%
Residents	Catherine Sayer	1,568	78.5	▲10.9
Conservative	Richard Aldridge	248	12.4	▼11.8
Liberal Democrats	Martin Caxton	100	5.0	▲1.2
Labour	Sara Jupp	81	4.1	▼0.3
Majority		1,320	66.1	▲22.7
Turnout		1,999	44.5	▼7.1
Residents hold		Swing		

=== Oxted South ===
Oxted South
Party	Candidate	Votes	%	±%
Residents	Bryan Black	1,211	67.1	▲9.5
Conservative	Nicolas Cook	253	14.0	▼8.9
Labour	James Tickner	229	12.7	▼1.4
Liberal Democrats	Kerrin McManus	113	6.3	▲1.0
Majority		958	53.1	▲18.4
Turnout		1,814	38.5	▼5.7
Residents hold		Swing		

=== Queens Park ===
Queens Park
Party	Candidate	Votes	%	±%
Liberal Democrats	Vicky Robinson	489	44.9	▼13.8
Conservative	Maria Grasso	486	44.6	▲12.3
Labour	Roy Stewart	114	10.5	▲4.7
Majority		3	0.3	▼26.1
Turnout		1,093	37.6	▼6.3
Liberal Democrats hold		Swing		

=== Warlingham East, Chelsham & Farleigh ===
Warlingham East, Chelsham & Farleigh
Party	Candidate	Votes	%	±%
Liberal Democrats	Perry Chotai	713	45.0	▼4.5
Conservative	Nathan Adams	517	32.6	▼2.4
Independent	Martin Haley	256	16.1	New
Labour	Mark Wilson	100	6.3	▼0.8
Majority		196	12.4	▼2.1
Turnout		1,590	36.7	▼2.8
Liberal Democrats hold		Swing		

=== Warlingham West ===
Warlingham West
Party	Candidate	Votes	%	±%
Conservative	Robin Bloore	483	45.7	▼16.5
Independent	Dan Matthews	272	25.8	New
Liberal Democrats	Neill Cooper	247	23.4	▼3.8
Labour	Nathan Manning	54	5.1	▼1.6
Majority		211	19.9	▼15.1
Turnout		1,060	37.7	▼1.1
Conservative hold		Swing		

=== Westway ===
Westway
Party	Candidate	Votes	%	±%
Liberal Democrats	Helen Bilton	491	50.7	▲8.5
Conservative	Derek Carpenter	317	32.7	▼2.1
Labour	Robin Clements	161	16.6	▼2.9
Majority		174	18.0	▲10.6
Turnout		972	28.4	▼5.3
Liberal Democrats hold		Swing		

=== Whyteleafe ===
Whyteleafe
Party	Candidate	Votes	%	±%
Liberal Democrats	Jeffrey Gray	490	48.5	▲2.0
Conservative	Fodi Foti	364	36.0	▼1.6
Labour	Jonathan Wheale	157	15.5	▲2.7
Majority		126	12.5	▲3.6
Turnout		1,020	31.5	▼2.8
Liberal Democrats hold		Swing		
