= Three Rivers District Council elections =

Local government elections in Hertfordshire, England

Three Rivers District Council elections are held three years out of four to elect members of Three Rivers District Council in Hertfordshire, England. Since the last boundary changes in 2014 the council has comprised 39 councillors representing 13 wards, each of which elects three councillors, one at each election such that a third of the council is elected each time. Elections to Hertfordshire County Council are held in the fourth year of the cycle when there are no district council elections.

== Council elections ==
Composition of the council
Year	Conservative	Labour	Liberal Democrats (Note: Includes totals for the predecessors of the Liberal Democrats, the Liberal Party and SDP (both of which participated in the Alliance).)	Green (Note: Includes totals for the predecessors of the Green Party of England and Wales, the Ecology Party and Green Party UK.)	Independents & Others	Council control after election
Local government reorganisation; council established (44 seats)
1973	19	13	12	–	0	No overall control
New ward boundaries (47 seats)
1976	32	10	5	0	0	Conservative
1978	32	9	6	0	0	Conservative
1979	30	10	7	0	0	Conservative
1980	30	10	7	0	0	Conservative
1982	27	9	11	0	0	Conservative
1983	26	9	12	0	0	Conservative
1984	24	9	14	0	0	Conservative
1986	17	8	22	0	0	No overall control
1987	16	7	24	0	0	Alliance
1988	16	7	24	0	0	SLD
1990	19	11	17	0	0	No overall control
New ward boundaries (48 seats)
1991	19	10	19	0	0	No overall control
1992	21	9	18	0	0	No overall control
1994	21	7	19	0	1	No overall control
1995	21	7	19	0	0	No overall control
1996	17	8	23	0	0	No overall control
1998	17	8	23	0	0	No overall control
New ward boundaries (48 seats)
1999	15	7	26	0	0	Liberal Democrats
2000	15	7	26	0	0	Liberal Democrats
2002	15	7	26	0	0	Liberal Democrats
2003	14	7	27	0	0	Liberal Democrats
2004	12	7	29	0	0	Liberal Democrats
2006	11	7	30	0	0	Liberal Democrats
2007	11	6	31	0	0	Liberal Democrats
2008	12	4	31	0	1	Liberal Democrats
2010	14	3	30	0	1	Liberal Democrats
2011	14	4	29	0	1	Liberal Democrats
2012	14	6	28	0	0	Liberal Democrats
New ward boundaries (39 seats)
2014	13	3	23	0	0	Liberal Democrats
2015	17	3	19	0	1	No overall control
2016	17	3	19	0	0	No overall control
2018	16	3	20	0	1	Liberal Democrats
2019	11	3	23	0	2	Liberal Democrats
2021	11	3	23	0	2	Liberal Democrats
2022	12	3	23	1	0	Liberal Democrats
2023	11	3	22	2	1	Liberal Democrats
2024	12	3	21	3	0	Liberal Democrats
2026	14	2	18	3	2	No overall control

== Results maps ==
2002 results map

2003 results map

2004 results map

2006 results map

2007 results map

2008 results map

2010 results map

2011 results map

2012 results map

2014 results map

2015 results map

2016 results map

2018 results map

2019 results map

2021 results map

2022 results map

2023 results map

2024 results map

2026 results map

== By-elections ==
=== 1994–1998 ===
Croxley Green South By-Election 28 November 1996
Party	Candidate	Votes	%	±%
Liberal Democrats		403	50.5	
Labour		255	32.0	
Conservative		139	17.4	
Majority		148	18.5	
Turnout		797	29.7	
Liberal Democrats hold		Swing		

Abbots Langley By-Election 2 January 1997
Party	Candidate	Votes	%	±%
Liberal Democrats		581	48.1	
Conservative		464	38.4	
Labour		164	13.6	
Majority		117	9.7	
Turnout		1,209	34.7	
Liberal Democrats hold		Swing		

=== 1998–2002 ===
Hayling By-Election 7 December 2000
Party	Candidate	Votes	%	±%
Labour	David Saxon	210	51.9	−3.9
Liberal Democrats	Raymond Tully	84	20.7	+2.2
Conservative	Graham Denman	74	18.3	−7.3
BNP	Ian Edward	37	9.1	+9.1
Majority		126	31.2	
Turnout		405	16.9	
Labour hold		Swing		

=== 2002–2006 ===
Hayling By-Election 14 June 2002
Party	Candidate	Votes	%	±%
Labour	Kerron Cross	188	38.8	−17.0
Conservative	Lynda Lewis	154	31.8	+6.2
Liberal Democrats	Alison Scarth	143	29.5	+11.0
Majority		34	7.0	
Turnout		485	19.8	
Labour hold		Swing		

Rickmansworth By-Election 5 May 2005
Party	Candidate	Votes	%	±%
Conservative	Mark Weedon	1,178	56.3	−5.9
Liberal Democrats	Leslie Mead	629	30.1	+4.1
Labour	Graham Dale	285	13.6	+0.0
Majority		549	26.2	
Turnout		2,092	66.5	
Conservative hold		Swing		

=== 2006–2010 ===
Leavesden By-Election 4 June 2009
Party	Candidate	Votes	%	±%
Liberal Democrats	Keith Williams	857	63.3	−8.7
Conservative	Chris Hawes	369	27.3	+5.7
Labour	Colin Gray	128	9.5	+3.0
Majority		488	36.0	
Turnout		1,354	33.4	
Liberal Democrats hold		Swing		

Hayling By-Election 24 September 2009
Party	Candidate	Votes	%	±%
Labour	Stephen King	487	53.9	+21.7
Conservative	Ty Harris	190	21.0	−4.6
BNP	Deirdre Gates	170	18.8	−11.5
Liberal Democrats	Dennis Rogers	56	6.2	−1.4
Majority		297	32.9	
Turnout		903	35.0	
Labour hold		Swing		

=== 2014–2018 ===
Gade Valley by-election, 12 January 2017
Party	Candidate	Votes	%	±%
Liberal Democrats	Alex Michaels	626	60.9	+24.0
Conservative	Dee Ward	196	19.1	−22.9
Labour	Bruce Prochnik	119	11.6	−9.6
UKIP	David Bennett	69	6.7	+6.7
Green	Roberta Curran	18	1.8	+1.8
Majority		430	41.8	
Turnout		1,028		
Liberal Democrats gain from Conservative		Swing		

Chorleywood South and Maple Cross by-election, 13 July 2017
Party	Candidate	Votes	%	±%
Liberal Democrats	Phil Williams	1,428	63.7	+4.6
Conservative	Colin Payne	597	26.6	−2.0
Labour	Jack Hazlewood	162	7.2	+0.1
UKIP	Hazel Day	28	1.2	−4.0
Green	Tab McLaughlin	27	1.2	+1.2
Majority		831	37.1	
Turnout		2,242		
Liberal Democrats hold		Swing		

Oxhey Hall and Hayling by-election, 12 October 2017
Party	Candidate	Votes	%	±%
Liberal Democrats	Keith Martin	672	41.3	−6.5
Conservative	Roy Clements	461	28.3	+2.7
Labour	Brendan O'Brien	428	26.3	+8.8
UKIP	Mick Matthewson	35	2.2	−7.0
Green	Matt Jones	31	1.9	+1.9
Majority		211	13.0	
Turnout		1,627		
Liberal Democrats gain from Conservative		Swing		

=== 2022–2026 ===
Chorleywood South and Maple Cross by-election, 14 December 2023
Party	Candidate	Votes	%	±%
Liberal Democrats	Harry Davies	694	57.5	+4.5
Conservative	Oliver Neville	355	29.4	+1.8
Green	Roger Stafford	102	8.5	−1.8
Labour	Martin Waldron	55	4.6	−4.5
Majority		339	28.1	
Turnout		1,206		
Liberal Democrats hold		Swing		

Rickmansworth Town by-election, 4 July 2024
Party	Candidate	Votes	%	±%
Conservative	Mike Sims	1,694	43.2	−0.5
Liberal Democrats	Pav Dhyani	1,329	33.9	−7.8
Labour	Martin Waldron	513	13.1	+5.2
Green	Roger Stafford	383	9.8	+3.1
Majority		365	9.3	+7.3
Turnout		3,945	68.4	+24.9
Conservative hold		Swing	+3.7	

Abbots Langley and Bedmond by-election, 22 August 2024
Party	Candidate	Votes	%	±%
Conservative	Vicky Edwards	593	40.5	+20.4
Liberal Democrats	Alex Turner	500	34.2	−24.3
Green	Jane Powell	233	15.9	+8.4
Labour	Pierce Culliton	137	9.4	−4.4
Majority		93	6.4	
Turnout		1,463		
Conservative gain from Liberal Democrats		Swing		

Abbots Langley and Bedmond by-election, 19 March 2025
Party	Candidate	Votes	%	±%
Conservative	Ian Campbell	657	40.0	+19.9
Liberal Democrats	Aidan Bentley	552	33.6	−24.9
Reform	Gavin Casey	214	13.0	+13.0
Green	Jane Powell	128	7.8	+0.3
Labour	Pierce Culliton	91	5.5	−8.3
Majority		105	6.4	
Turnout		1,642		
Conservative gain from Liberal Democrats		Swing		

Durrants by-election, 1 May 2025
Party	Candidate	Votes	%	±%
Liberal Democrats	Paul Rainbow	1,010	49.3	−15.7
Green	Andrew Gallagher	457	22.3	+1.2
Reform	George Moss	374	18.3	+18.3
Conservative	Gordon Elvey	161	7.9	−0.7
Labour	Jeni Swift Gillett	45	2.2	−3.1
Majority		553	27.0	
Turnout		2,047		
Liberal Democrats hold		Swing		

== See also ==
- Politics of Three Rivers (district)
