= 2021 Hertfordshire County Council election =

2021 UK local government election

- 6 May 2021

All 78 seats to Hertfordshire County Council 40 seats needed for a majority
- Turnout: 37.2%

	First party	Second party
Leader	David Williams	Stephen Giles-Medhurst
Party	Conservative	Liberal Democrats
Last election	51 seats, 45.9%	18 seats, 25.1%
Seats before	49	18
Seats won	46	23
Seat change	▼5	▲5
Popular vote	142,051	86,969
Percentage	43.3%	26.5%
Swing	▼2.6 pp	▲1.4 pp
	Third party	Fourth party
Leader	Judi Billing	Ben Crystall
Party	Labour	Green
Last election	9 seats, 20.5%	0 seats, 4.0%
Seats before	9	0
Seats won	7	1
Seat change	▼2	▲1
Popular vote	69,612	24,508
Percentage	21.2%	7.5%
Swing	▲0.7 pp	▲3.5 pp
- Map showing the results of the 2021 Hertfordshire County Council election.

- Council composition after the election.
Council control before election
Conservative
Council control after election
Conservative

Elections to Hertfordshire County Council took place on 6 May 2021 alongside other local elections in the United Kingdom. All 78 seats to the council were elected.

The Conservative Party won 46 of the 78 seats, winning a majority and thus retaining control of the council, despite making a net loss of five seats, with leader David Williams losing his seat of Harpenden North East. Deputy Leader of the Council Teresa Heritage became acting leader in the aftermath of the election, and Cllr Richard Roberts was ratified as Leader of the Council on 25 May 2021.

== Background ==
In the 2017 election, the Conservative Party held overall control of the council, winning 51 of the 78 seats. The Liberal Democrats were the second largest party with 18 seats. The Labour Party won 9 seats.

Several by-elections took place between the 2017 and 2021 elections:

By-elections
Division	Date	Incumbent	Party	Winner	Party	Cause	Ref.
Goffs Oak and Bury Green	22 February 2018	Robert Gordon	Conservative	Lesley Greensmyth	Conservative	Death	
St Albans North	3 May 2018	Charlotte Hogg	Liberal Democrats	Roma Mills	Labour	Resignation due to work commitments	
Three Rivers Rural	25 October 2018	Chris Hayward	Conservative	Phil Williams	Liberal Democrats	Resignation	

Roma Mills, councillor for St Albans North, resigned from the Labour Party in April 2020 after Keir Starmer was elected Leader of the Labour Party, citing her disagreement with his changes in policies. Andrew Stevenson, councillor for Hertford All Saints, resigned from the Conservative Party in December 2020 due to his opposition to the two-tier local government structure in Hertfordshire and having failed to be reselected by the Hertford and Stortford Conservatives.

As a result, the Conservatives had 49 councillors and 2 councillors sat as independents, giving the Conservatives a majority of 20 before the 2021 election.

In the 2019 general election, the Liberal Democrats won St Albans for the first time since the party's formation, defeating the incumbent Conservative Member of Parliament.

== Campaign ==
=== Environment ===
The Conservatives pledged to achieve carbon neutrality by 2050, and that by 2030, Hertfordshire County Council would be carbon-neutral and waste would no longer be sent to landfill.

The Liberal Democrats pledged to achieve carbon neutrality by 2030 by introducing solar powered lighting on walking and cycling routes, and a £2.5 million fund for charging stations for electric vehicles.

=== Local government structure ===
In 2020, Leader of the Council David Williams advocated merging Hertfordshire County Council and the ten district councils into a single unitary authority. Hertfordshire County Council suggested that the proposal could save £140 million per year.

Labour committed to opposing any plans for a Hertfordshire unitary authority.

=== Transport ===
Labour supported an increase in the number of late night buses, and would reinstate bus subsidies. The party also supported the reopening of a passing loop on the Abbey Line to increase the railway's capacity, and would push for Oyster card functionality for railway stations close to London. Leader of the Labour group Judi Billing stated that she believed that a 20 mph speed limit should be the default on roads in Hertfordshire.

The Green Party and the Liberal Democrats also supported the introduction of a default 20 mph speed limit on residential roads.

== Procedure ==
The elections were held during the COVID-19 pandemic in the United Kingdom. Hertfordshire County Council advised that the ballot boxes should not be opened for 24 hours after the polls closed to prevent the spread of COVID-19. The Borough of Broxbourne began counting the votes on 7 May, while the other nine districts of Hertfordshire began counting on 8 May. Some districts also opted to not count the votes for the district council elections until 9 May to reduce the number of people required to be present, and make social distancing easier.

== Summary ==
=== Election result ===
2021 Hertfordshire County Council election
Party	Candidates	Seats	Gains	Losses	Net gain/loss	Seats %	Votes %	Votes	+/−
Conservative	78	46	7	12	▼5	59.0	43.3	142,051	–2.6
Liberal Democrats	77	23	7	2	▲5	29.5	26.5	86,969	+1.4
Labour	78	7	3	5	▼2	9.0	21.2	69,612	+0.7
Green	59	1	1	0	▲1	1.3	7.5	24,508	+3.5
Independent	5	1	1	0	▲1	1.3	0.8	2,683	+0.4
TUSC	11	0	0	0	Steady	0.0	0.2	633	±0.0
Reform	7	0	0	0	Steady	0.0	0.2	548	N/A
UKIP	2	0	0	0	Steady	0.0	0.1	203	–3.7
Abolish the Town Council Party	1	0	0	0	Steady	0.0	0.1	179	N/A
CPA	3	0	0	0	Steady	0.0	0.1	178	N/A
Alliance for Democracy and Freedom (UK)	1	0	0	0	Steady	0.0	<0.1	133	N/A
Heritage	1	0	0	0	Steady	0.0	<0.1	60	N/A

The Conservatives won 46 of the 78 seats, remaining in control of the council and giving them a majority of 14, despite making a net loss of five seats. The Liberal Democrats remained the second-largest party, winning 23 seats, the highest number of seats since the party's formation. The Greens won a seat for the first time since the 2009 election.

== Results by division ==
=== Broxbourne ===
The Borough of Broxbourne shown within Hertfordshire

The election was held alongside an election to Broxbourne Borough Council.

Broxbourne district summary
Party	Seats	+/-	Votes	%	+/-
Conservative	6	Steady	13,461	62.2	+0.3
Labour	0	Steady	5,273	24.4	+4.0
Liberal Democrats	0	Steady	1,777	8.2	+1.8
Green	0	Steady	885	4.1	+2.2
Independent	0	Steady	236	1.1	N/A
Total	6	Steady	21,632		

Division results

Cheshunt Central
Party	Candidate	Votes	%	±%
Conservative	Steve Wortley	2,117	61.0	▼0.4
Labour	Andreas Georgiou	1,004	28.9	▲4.7
Liberal Democrats	Kostas Inchenko	348	10.0	▲5.3
Majority		1,113	32.1	▼5.1
Turnout		3,469	28.3	▲2.9
Conservative hold		Swing	▼2.6	

Flamstead End and Turnford
Party	Candidate	Votes	%	±%
Conservative	Mark Mills-Bishop	2,280	67.9	▲3.0
Labour	Beverly Hanshaw	712	21.2	▲3.4
Green	Owen Brett	248	7.4	N/A
Liberal Democrats	Chris Wilson	120	3.6	▼1.1
Majority		1,568	46.7	▼0.4
Turnout		3,360	28.4	▲3.1
Conservative hold		Swing	▼0.2	

Goffs Oak and Bury Green
Party	Candidate	Votes	%	±%
Conservative	Lesley Greensmyth	2,352	63.8	▼0.3
Labour	Jo Goldsmith	620	16.8	▼1.3
Liberal Democrats	David Payne	488	13.2	▲7.2
Green	Robert Gledhill	227	6.2	N/A
Majority		1,732	47.0	▲1.1
Turnout		3,687	29.9	▲3.9
Conservative hold		Swing	▲0.5	

Hoddesdon North
Party	Candidate	Votes	%	±%
Conservative	Lewis Cocking	2,324	68.6	▲8.7
Labour	George Williams	718	21.2	▲5.3
Liberal Democrats	Julia Davies	348	10.3	▲3.7
Majority		1,606	47.4	▲3.4
Turnout		3,390	28.1	▲0.2
Conservative hold		Swing	▲1.7	

Hoddesdon South
Party	Candidate	Votes	%	±%
Conservative	Paul Mason	2,637	67.0	▲1.4
Labour	Jean Legg	573	14.6	▲3.0
Green	Sally Kemp	410	10.4	▲4.7
Liberal Democrats	David Davies	313	8.0	0.0
Majority		2,064	52.5	▼1.6
Turnout		3,933	32.6	▲0.3
Conservative hold		Swing	▼0.8	

Waltham Cross
Party	Candidate	Votes	%	±%
Conservative	Dee Hart	1,751	46.2	▼8.0
Labour	Sean Waters	1,646	43.4	▲6.0
Independent	Cody McCormick	236	6.2	N/A
Liberal Democrats	John Wiggett	160	4.2	▼4.2
Majority		105	2.8	▼13.9
Turnout		3,793	31.1	▲4.8
Conservative hold		Swing	▼7.0	

=== Dacorum ===
The Borough of Dacorum shown within Hertfordshire

Dacorum district summary
Party	Seats	+/-	Votes	%	+/-
Conservative	5	▼3	16,966	42.1	–5.7
Liberal Democrats	4	▲2	12,112	30.0	+5.5
Independent	1	▲1	1,405	3.5	+1.3
Labour	0	Steady	6,054	15.0	–1.8
Green	0	Steady	3,700	9.2	+5.0
Reform UK	0	Steady	73	0.2	N/A
Total	10	Steady	40,310		

Division results

Berkhamsted
Party	Candidate	Votes	%	±%
Liberal Democrats	Nigel Taylor	2,949	51.8	▲12.4
Conservative	Peter Matthews	1,695	29.8	▼11.6
Green	Joe Stopps	557	9.8	▲1.4
Labour	Cameron Brady-Turner	487	8.6	▼0.1
Majority		1,254	22.0	N/A
Turnout		5,688	46.5	▲5.4
Liberal Democrats gain from Conservative		Swing	▲12.0	

Bridgewater
Party	Candidate	Votes	%	±%
Conservative	Terry Douris	2,070	46.2	▼11.7
Liberal Democrats	Lara Pringle	1,733	38.7	▲12.2
Labour	Vanessa Mitchell	322	7.2	▼4.0
Green	Emily Spry	283	6.3	N/A
Reform	Noel Willcox	73	1.6	N/A
Majority		337	7.5	▼23.9
Turnout		4,481	41.1	▲4.5
Conservative hold		Swing	▼11.9	

Hemel Hempstead East
Party	Candidate	Votes	%	±%
Conservative	Andrew Williams	2,016	59.3	▼2.8
Labour	Ijlal Malik	686	20.2	▼2.8
Liberal Democrats	Anna Wellings Purvis	416	12.2	▲6.6
Green	Paul de Hoest	282	8.3	▼1.0
Majority		1,330	39.1	▲0.0
Turnout		3,400	30.5	▲0.4
Conservative hold		Swing	▲0.0	

Hemel Hempstead North East
Party	Candidate	Votes	%	±%
Conservative	Colette Wyatt-Lowe	1,657	60.1	▲4.4
Labour	Saba Poursaeedi	597	21.7	▼2.2
Liberal Democrats	Neil Kennedy	280	10.2	▲1.4
Green	Paul Sandford	222	8.1	▲4.6
Majority		1,060	38.5	▲6.6
Turnout		2,756	27.0	▼2.6
Conservative hold		Swing	▲3.3	

Hemel Hempstead North West
Party	Candidate	Votes	%	±%
Conservative	Fiona Guest	1,917	55.5	▼0.5
Labour	Gary Adamson	811	23.5	▼0.6
Liberal Democrats	Diane Wilson	396	11.5	▲2.3
Green	Sherief Hassan	328	9.5	▲4.2
Majority		1,106	32.0	▲0.1
Turnout		3,452	30.0	▼0.8
Conservative hold		Swing	▲0.0	

Hemel Hempstead South East
Party	Candidate	Votes	%	±%
Independent	Jan Maddern	1,405	36.5	▲13.9
Conservative	Sanjay Jamuar	1,157	30.0	▼8.5
Labour	Mandi Tattershall	887	23.0	▼5.1
Green	David Lillywhite	225	5.8	N/A
Liberal Democrats	Joe Toovey	180	4.7	▼1.4
Majority		248	6.4	N/A
Turnout		3,854	31.5	▲0.5
Independent gain from Conservative		Swing	▲11.2	

Hemel Hempstead St Paul's
Party	Candidate	Votes	%	±%
Liberal Democrats	Ron Tindall	1,230	42.8	▼2.9
Conservative	Soma Pemmireddy	811	28.2	▲2.0
Labour	Luke Jordan	605	21.1	▼0.1
Green	Bernard Hurley	226	7.9	N/A
Majority		419	14.6	▼4.9
Turnout		2,872	26.3	▼2.8
Liberal Democrats hold		Swing	▼2.5	

Hemel Hempstead Town
Party	Candidate	Votes	%	±%
Liberal Democrats	Adrian England	1,745	41.5	▲21.1
Conservative	William Wyatt-Lowe	1,485	35.3	▼16.4
Labour	Tessa Milligan	632	15.0	▼6.2
Green	Samuel Deering	347	8.2	▲1.5
Majority		260	6.2	N/A
Turnout		4,209	36.6	▲4.8
Liberal Democrats gain from Conservative		Swing	▲18.7	

Kings Langley
Party	Candidate	Votes	%	±%
Conservative	Richard Roberts	2,472	62.1	▼4.5
Green	Ashley Lawrence	616	15.5	▲9.9
Labour	Rob Eilbeck	523	13.1	▲0.7
Liberal Democrats	Dominic Sokalski	369	9.3	▼2.3
Majority		1,856	46.6	▼7.5
Turnout		3,980	36.7	▲2.9
Conservative hold		Swing	▼7.2	

Tring
Party	Candidate	Votes	%	±%
Liberal Democrats	Sally Symington	2,814	50.1	▲0.3
Conservative	Gbola Adeleke	1,686	30.0	▼4.6
Green	Roger Oliver	614	10.9	▲6.1
Labour	Jim Lawler	504	9.0	▲2.1
Majority		1,128	20.1	▲4.9
Turnout		5,618	44.7	▲1.5
Liberal Democrats hold		Swing	▲2.5	

=== East Hertfordshire ===
East Hertfordshire District shown within Hertfordshire

East Hertfordshire district summary
Party	Seats	+/-	Votes	%	+/-
Conservative	8	▼2	20,328	50.5	–7.5
Green	1	▲1	6,005	14.9	+8.8
Liberal Democrats	1	▲1	5,911	14.7	–2.1
Labour	0	Steady	7,512	18.6	+3.0
Independent	0	Steady	262	0.7	N/A
ADF	0	Steady	133	0.3	N/A
Reform UK	0	Steady	94	0.2	N/A
TUSC	0	Steady	38	0.1	N/A
Total	10	Steady	40,283		

Division results

Bishop's Stortford East
Party	Candidate	Votes	%	±%
Liberal Democrats	Calvin Horner	1,894	45.6	▲5.6
Conservative	John Wyllie	1,401	33.7	▼8.6
Labour	Oya Er Wilkes	568	13.7	▲0.9
Green	Graeme Hill	292	7.0	▲2.0
Majority		493	11.9	N/A
Turnout		4,155	38.6	▲5.2
Liberal Democrats gain from Conservative		Swing	▲7.1	

Bishop's Stortford Rural
Party	Candidate	Votes	%	±%
Conservative	Graham McAndrew	1,943	53.8	▼6.9
Labour	Milly Lynch	725	20.1	▲8.8
Liberal Democrats	Bob Taylor	562	15.6	▲0.6
Green	David Oxley	382	10.6	▲6.2
Majority		1,218	33.7	▼15.7
Turnout		3,612	34.1	▲0.2
Conservative hold		Swing	▼7.8	

Bishop's Stortford West
Party	Candidate	Votes	%	±%
Conservative	Alastair Ward-Booth	1,744	44.4	▼6.5
Labour	Thomas Diamond	989	25.2	▲5.1
Liberal Democrats	Richard Townsend	741	18.9	▲2.6
Green	Madela Baddock	456	11.6	▲4.8
Majority		755	19.2	▼11.6
Turnout		3,930	31.6	▼0.7
Conservative hold		Swing	▼5.8	

Buntingford
Party	Candidate	Votes	%	±%
Conservative	Jeff Jones	2,393	60.6	▼8.1
Green	David Woollcombe	704	17.8	▲13.1
Labour	Steven Stone	532	13.5	▲1.7
Liberal Democrats	Karl Harrington	224	5.7	▼3.0
Reform	Terry Smith	94	2.4	N/A
Majority		1,689	42.8	▼21.2
Turnout		3,947	33.6	▲1.3
Conservative hold		Swing	▼10.6	

Hertford All Saints
Party	Candidate	Votes	%	±%
Green	Ben Crystall	1,819	43.2	▲34.0
Conservative	Jan Goodeve	1,562	37.1	▼27.0
Labour	Rob Pinkham	621	14.7	▼12.0
Independent	Andrew Stevenson	262	5.9	N/A
Liberal Democrats	Andrew Porrer	211	5.0	▼11.5
Majority		257	6.1	N/A
Turnout		4,213	39.6	▲10.8
Green gain from Conservative		Swing	▲30.5	

Hertford Rural
Party	Candidate	Votes	%	±%
Conservative	Ken Crofton	2,710	63.2	▼9.5
Liberal Democrats	Daniel Newton	612	14.3	▲4.7
Green	Lydia Somerville	506	11.8	▲4.6
Labour	Margaret Williams	461	10.7	▲0.1
Majority		2,098	48.9	▼13.2
Turnout		4,289	39.5	▲1.9
Conservative hold		Swing	▼7.1	

Hertford St Andrews
Party	Candidate	Votes	%	±%
Conservative	Bob Deering	1,925	46.3	▼4.6
Labour	Josh Dean	1,756	42.2	▲15.8
Liberal Democrats	Geoff Madge	481	11.6	▼3.1
Majority		169	4.1	▼20.4
Turnout		4,162	35.5	▲6.3
Conservative hold		Swing	▼10.2	

Sawbridgeworth
Party	Candidate	Votes	%	±%
Conservative	Eric Buckmaster	2,795	65.0	▲3.2
Liberal Democrats	Joseph Dumont	836	19.5	▲5.6
Labour	Dawn Newell	666	15.5	▲3.7
Majority		1,959	45.6	▼2.4
Turnout		4,297	34.4	▲3.0
Conservative hold		Swing	▼1.2	

Ware North
Party	Candidate	Votes	%	±%
Conservative	David Andrews	1,879	51.1	▼4.2
Green	Nicholas Cox	1,255	34.1	▲28.0
Labour	Megan McCann	506	13.8	▲0.0
TUSC	Bryan Clare	38	1.0	N/A
Majority		624	17.0	▼32.2
Turnout		3,678	34.2	▲3.9
Conservative hold		Swing	▼16.1	

Ware South
Party	Candidate	Votes	%	±%
Conservative	Jonathan Kaye	1,976	52.9	▼11.3
Labour	Sarah Chapman	688	18.4	▲4.5
Green	Martin Butcher	591	15.8	▲8.2
Liberal Democrats	Victoria Shaw	350	9.4	▼5.0
ADF	Benjamin Parker	133	3.6	N/A
Majority		1,288	34.5	▼15.8
Turnout		3,738	32.7	▲3.9
Conservative hold		Swing	▼7.9	

=== Hertsmere ===
The Borough of Hertsmere shown within Hertfordshire

Hertsmere district summary
Party	Seats	+/-	Votes	%	+/-
Conservative	4	▼3	14,365	50.1	–9.5
Labour	2	▲2	7,689	26.8	+6.1
Liberal Democrats	1	▲1	4,292	15.0	+3.1
Green	0	Steady	1,581	5.5	+2.9
Independent	0	Steady	653	2.3	N/A
UKIP	0	Steady	81	0.3	–4.8
TUSC	0	Steady	21	0.1	±0.0
Total	7	Steady	28,682		

Division results

Borehamwood North
Party	Candidate	Votes	%	±%
Labour	Michelle Vince	1,796	52.7	▲14.3
Conservative	Gavin Haran	1,354	39.7	▼7.9
Liberal Democrats	Maxie Allen	131	3.8	▼1.4
Green	Julie Rackham	106	3.1	N/A
TUSC	Mark Pickersgill	21	0.6	0.0
Majority		442	13.0	N/A
Turnout		3,408	29.2	▲2.3
Labour gain from Conservative		Swing	▲11.1	

Borehamwood South
Party	Candidate	Votes	%	±%
Labour	Richard Butler	1,670	46.5	▲9.4
Conservative	Brett Rosehill	1,500	41.8	▼5.7
Green	Madalyn Bielfeld	215	6.0	N/A
Liberal Democrats	Clive Parish	125	3.5	▼3.4
UKIP	David Appleby	81	2.3	▼6.3
Majority		170	4.7	N/A
Turnout		3,591	32.1	▲3.4
Labour gain from Conservative		Swing	▲7.5	

Bushey North
Party	Candidate	Votes	%	±%
Liberal Democrats	Laurence Brass	2,160	52.7	▲21.1
Conservative	Jane West	1,390	33.9	▼13.7
Labour	Elodie Mayo	361	8.8	▼4.0
Green	Matt Wheeler	188	4.6	▲1.1
Majority		770	18.8	N/A
Turnout		4,099	38.8	
Liberal Democrats gain from Conservative		Swing	▲17.4	

Bushey South
Party	Candidate	Votes	%	±%
Conservative	Seamus Quilty	2,408	56.9	▼12.8
Liberal Democrats	Paul Richards	1,206	28.5	▲12.6
Labour	Sharan Sanghera	395	9.3	▼1.7
Green	Eddy Canfor-Dumas	226	5.3	▲1.9
Majority		1,202	28.4	▼25.4
Turnout		4,235	39.3	▲5.9
Conservative hold		Swing	▼12.7	

Potters Bar East
Party	Candidate	Votes	%	±%
Conservative	John Graham	2,296	52.3	▼8.2
Labour	Chris Myers	1,553	35.4	▲16.5
Green	Frank Jeffs	283	6.4	▲0.7
Liberal Democrats	Jon Brett	259	5.9	▼1.1
Majority		743	16.9	▼24.7
Turnout		4,391	37.1	▲6.1
Conservative hold		Swing	▼12.4	

Potters Bar West and Shenley
Party	Candidate	Votes	%	±%
Conservative	Morris Bright	2,014	45.4	▼15.0
Labour	Christian Gray	1,364	30.7	▲8.8
Independent	Rosemary Gilligan	653	14.7	N/A
Green	John Humphries	254	5.7	N/A
Liberal Democrats	Ron Das Gupta	154	3.5	▼6.7
Majority		650	14.6	▼23.8
Turnout		4,439	38.9	
Conservative hold		Swing	▼11.9	

Watling
Party	Candidate	Votes	%	±%
Conservative	Caroline Clapper	3,403	75.3	▼2.2
Labour	Alpha Collins	550	12.2	▲2.9
Green	Paul Morse	309	6.8	▲2.1
Liberal Democrats	Mandy McNeil	257	5.7	▼2.8
Majority		2,853	63.1	▼5.2
Turnout		4,519	39.9	▲7.0
Conservative hold		Swing	▼2.6	

=== North Hertfordshire ===
North Hertfordshire District shown within Hertfordshire

The election was held alongside an election to North Hertfordshire District Council.

North Hertfordshire district summary
Party	Seats	+/-	Votes	%	+/-
Conservative	5	▼2	18,317	43.3	–3.4
Labour	2	▲1	10,577	25.0	+2.5
Liberal Democrats	2	▲1	9,439	22.3	+0.2
Green	0	Steady	3,649	8.6	+2.5
CPA	0	Steady	178	0.4	N/A
Reform UK	0	Steady	91	0.2	N/A
TUSC	0	Steady	22	0.1	±0.0
Total	9	Steady	42,273		

Division results

Baldock and Letchworth East
Party	Candidate	Votes	%	±%
Conservative	Michael Muir	1,963	45.1	▼3.6
Labour	Leo Chapman	1,251	28.7	▲8.5
Liberal Democrats	Richard Winter	624	14.3	▼4.5
Green	Tim Lee	516	11.9	▲5.5
Majority		712	16.4	▼12.2
Turnout		4,354	40.4	▲5.5
Conservative hold		Swing	▼6.1	

Hitchin North
Party	Candidate	Votes	%	±%
Labour	Judi Billing	2,701	52.4	▲1.3
Conservative	John Bishop	1,366	26.5	▼1.5
Green	Mary Marshall	530	10.3	▲2.9
Liberal Democrats	Andrew Ircha	484	9.4	▼3.3
CPA	Sid Cordle	71	1.4	N/A
Majority		1,335	25.9	▲2.7
Turnout		5,152	43.1	▲5.7
Labour hold		Swing	▲1.4	

Hitchin Rural
Party	Candidate	Votes	%	±%
Conservative	David Barnard	2,127	48.4	▼8.4
Green	Anni Sander	980	22.3	▲12.6
Labour	Anton Jungreuthmayer	818	18.6	▼2.4
Liberal Democrats	Marilyn Parkin	413	9.4	▼2.9
CPA	Daisy Appoh	53	1.2	N/A
Majority		1,147	26.1	▼9.7
Turnout		4,391	41.8	▲7.8
Conservative hold		Swing	▼10.5	

Hitchin South
Party	Candidate	Votes	%	±%
Liberal Democrats	Paul Clark	1,930	37.7	▼1.2
Conservative	Derrick Ashley	1,888	36.9	▼4.5
Labour	Elizabeth Dennis-Harburg	765	15.0	▲1.4
Green	Sam Larsen	455	8.9	▲2.9
CPA	Leigh Smith	54	1.1	N/A
TUSC	Barbara Clare	22	0.4	N/A
Majority		42	0.8	N/A
Turnout		5,114	47.0	▲4.6
Liberal Democrats gain from Conservative		Swing	▲1.7	

Knebworth and Codicote
Party	Candidate	Votes	%	±%
Conservative	Richard Thake	2,504	55.5	▼0.4
Liberal Democrats	Terry Tyler	886	19.6	▼5.3
Labour	Doug Jenner	647	14.3	▲1.1
Green	Katrina Nice	473	10.5	▲4.6
Majority		1,618	35.9	▲4.9
Turnout		4,510	44.9	▲7.6
Conservative hold		Swing	▲2.5	

Letchworth North
Party	Candidate	Votes	%	±%
Labour	Tina Bhartwas	2,044	45.7	▲5.2
Conservative	Simon Bloxham	1,998	44.7	▲1.5
Liberal Democrats	Jerry Evans	426	9.5	▲0.8
Majority		46	1.0	N/A
Turnout		4,468	37.6	▲3.3
Labour gain from Conservative		Swing	▲1.8	

Letchworth South
Party	Candidate	Votes	%	±%
Conservative	Terry Hone	2,254	47.7	▼3.8
Labour	Amy Allen	1,163	24.6	▲3.4
Liberal Democrats	Phil Weeder	830	17.6	▲0.4
Green	Alan Borgars	384	8.1	▲3.2
Reform	Garry Warren	91	1.9	N/A
Majority		1,091	23.1	▼7.2
Turnout		4,722	42.9	▲6.1
Conservative hold		Swing	▼3.6	

Royston East and Ermine
Party	Candidate	Votes	%	±%
Conservative	Fiona Hill	2,317	50.9	▼7.1
Liberal Democrats	Ruth Brown	1,255	27.6	▲11.2
Labour	Stephen Lockett	669	14.7	▲2.3
Green	Steven Turner	311	6.8	▲1.9
Majority		1,062	23.3	▼18.3
Turnout		4,552	39.9	▲4.8
Conservative hold		Swing	▼9.1	

Royston West and Rural
Party	Candidate	Votes	%	±%
Liberal Democrats	Steve Jarvis	2,591	51.7	▲8.5
Conservative	George Davies	1,900	37.9	▼3.9
Labour	Ken Garland	519	10.4	▲2.1
Majority		691	13.8	▲12.4
Turnout		5,010	41.2	▲2.3
Liberal Democrats hold		Swing	▲6.2	

=== St Albans ===
St Albans City and District shown within Hertfordshire

The election was held alongside an election to St Albans City and District Council.

St Albans district summary
Party	Seats	+/-	Votes	%	+/-
Liberal Democrats	6	▲1	23,043	46.2	+8.2
Conservative	4	Steady	17,293	34.7	–4.2
Labour	0	▼1	5,315	10.7	–5.6
Green	0	Steady	4,041	8.1	+3.8
Reform UK	0	Steady	152	0.3	N/A
Total	10	Steady	49,844		

Division results

Colney Heath and Marshalswick
Party	Candidate	Votes	%	±%
Liberal Democrats	John Hale	2,522	52.6	▲6.6
Conservative	Beric Read	1,622	33.8	▼5.5
Labour	Iain Grant	335	7.0	▼1.6
Green	James Ryan	315	6.6	▲3.2
Majority		900	18.8	▲12.1
Turnout		4,794	44.4	▲1.6
Liberal Democrats hold		Swing	▲6.1	

Harpenden North East
Party	Candidate	Votes	%	±%
Liberal Democrats	Paul de Kort	2,063	41.8	▲14.8
Conservative	David Williams	2,022	40.9	▼12.1
Green	Nina Vinther	435	8.8	▲4.6
Labour	James Gill	420	8.5	▼4.7
Majority		41	0.8	N/A
Turnout		4,940	43.9	▲6.9
Liberal Democrats gain from Conservative		Swing	▲13.4	

Harpenden Rural
Party	Candidate	Votes	%	±%
Conservative	Annie Brewster	2,833	57.1	▼5.2
Liberal Democrats	Stephen Barrett	1,253	25.3	▲5.9
Labour	Symon Vegro	531	10.7	▲0.0
Green	Dee Thomas	341	6.9	▲2.6
Majority		1,580	31.9	▼11.1
Turnout		4,958	44.2	▲3.9
Conservative hold		Swing	▼5.6	

Harpenden South West
Party	Candidate	Votes	%	±%
Conservative	Teresa Heritage	2,942	54.7	▼7.7
Liberal Democrats	Jeffrey Phillips	1,325	24.7	▲2.3
Green	Kyle Riley	654	12.2	▲8.5
Labour	Linda Spiri	453	8.4	▼1.3
Majority		1,617	30.1	▼10.0
Turnout		5,374	46.5	▲5.1
Conservative hold		Swing	▼5.0	

London Colney
Party	Candidate	Votes	%	±%
Conservative	Sarah Tallon	1,153	36.4	▲3.4
Labour	Dreda Gordon	948	29.9	▼12.7
Liberal Democrats	Liz Needham	803	25.3	▲1.4
Green	Matt Fisher	265	8.4	▲4.8
Majority		205	6.5	N/A
Turnout		3,169	34.2	▲0.2
Conservative gain from Labour		Swing	▲8.0	

St Albans Central
Party	Candidate	Votes	%	±%
Liberal Democrats	Christopher White	3,461	62.3	▲7.2
Conservative	Georgie Callé	923	16.6	▼5.1
Green	Candy Whittome	666	12.0	▲1.0
Labour	David Allan	509	9.2	▼2.7
Majority		2,538	45.7	12.2
Turnout		5,559	45.6	▲4.4
Liberal Democrats hold		Swing	▲6.1	

St Albans East
Party	Candidate	Votes	%	±%
Liberal Democrats	Anthony Rowlands	3,014	61.3	▲6.1
Conservative	Richard Curthoys	960	19.5	▼0.5
Labour	John Paton	551	11.2	▼6.6
Green	Caro Hall	391	8.0	▲4.0
Majority		2,054	41.8	▲6.6
Turnout		4,916	44.5	▲4.4
Liberal Democrats hold		Swing	▲3.3	

St Albans North
Party	Candidate	Votes	%	±%
Liberal Democrats	Helen Campbell	2,839	54.9	▲19.6
Conservative	Salih Gaygusuz	1,256	24.3	▼1.8
Labour	Jeremy Newmark	628	12.1	▼21.7
Green	Danielle Durant-Taylor	374	7.2	▲4.1
Reform	David Thurston	72	1.4	N/A
Majority		1,583	30.6	▲29.1
Turnout		5,169	48.9	▲2.3
Liberal Democrats hold		Swing	▲10.7	

The St Albans North division had been gained by Labour in a 2018 by-election.

St Albans South
Party	Candidate	Votes	%	±%
Liberal Democrats	Sandy Walkington	3,575	62.2	▲7.2
Conservative	Susan Devi	1,174	20.4	▼4.2
Labour	Janet Smith	610	10.6	▼3.9
Green	Jon Littlewood	309	5.4	▲1.8
Reform	Andrew Butchart	80	1.4	N/A
Majority		2,401	41.8	▲11.4
Turnout		5,748	51.5	▲3.4
Liberal Democrats hold		Swing	▲5.7	

St Stephen's
Party	Candidate	Votes	%	±%
Conservative	Stella Nash	2,408	46.2	▼2.4
Liberal Democrats	Emma Matanle	2,188	41.9	▲3.4
Labour	Janet Blackwell	330	6.3	▼1.3
Green	Nick Bainbridge	291	5.6	▲3.6
Majority		220	4.2	▼5.8
Turnout		5,217	45.3	▲4.6
Conservative hold		Swing	▼2.9	

=== Stevenage ===
The Borough of Stevenage shown within Hertfordshire

The election was held alongside an election to Stevenage Borough Council.

Stevenage district summary
Party	Seats	+/-	Votes	%	+/-
Conservative	4	▲1	9,379	40.6	+0.6
Labour	1	▼1	8,402	36.3	–1.7
Liberal Democrats	1	Steady	3,481	15.1	+0.4
Green	0	Steady	1,322	5.7	+2.5
TUSC	0	Steady	338	1.5	+0.3
UKIP	0	Steady	122	0.5	–2.5
Reform UK	0	Steady	71	0.3	N/A
Total	6	Steady	23,115		

Division results

Bedwell
Party	Candidate	Votes	%	±%
Labour	Sharon Taylor	1,705	47.5	▼3.7
Conservative	Janet Munro	1,243	34.6	▼3.0
Liberal Democrats	Jill Brinkworth	349	9.7	▲4.4
Green	Dean Carpenter	216	6.0	▲1.7
TUSC	Steve Glennon	75	2.1	▲0.5
Majority		462	12.9	▼0.6
Turnout		3,588	33.4	▲1.9
Labour hold		Swing	▼0.3	

Broadwater
Party	Candidate	Votes	%	±%
Conservative	Adam Mitchell	1,915	48.2	▼0.8
Labour	Syeda Rahim	1,219	30.7	▼7.9
Liberal Democrats	Andy McGuinness	356	9.0	▲1.8
Green	Richard Warr	296	7.5	▲3.9
UKIP	Peter Colley	122	3.1	N/A
TUSC	Helen Kerr	62	1.6	▼0.1
Majority		696	17.5	▲7.1
Turnout		3,970	34.8	▲0.3
Conservative hold		Swing	▲3.6	

Chells
Party	Candidate	Votes	%	±%
Liberal Democrats	Robin Parker	1,857	46.0	▼4.3
Conservative	Layla Buckingham	1,112	27.5	▲3.4
Labour	Conor McGrath	817	20.2	▲0.8
Green	Naomi Lovelace-Collins	201	5.0	N/A
TUSC	Roger Charles	54	1.3	▲0.5
Majority		745	18.4	▼7.7
Turnout		4,041	36.1	▲1.1
Liberal Democrats hold		Swing	▼3.8	

Old Stevenage
Party	Candidate	Votes	%	±%
Conservative	Graham Lawrence	1,827	44.8	▲3.6
Labour	Richard Henry	1,681	41.2	▼0.4
Green	Elizabeth Sturges	387	9.5	▲5.3
Liberal Democrats	Madani Mannan	186	6.2	▼1.7
Majority		146	3.6	N/A
Turnout		4,081	38.4	▲2.5
Conservative gain from Labour		Swing	▲2.0	

Shephall
Party	Candidate	Votes	%	±%
Conservative	Roni Hearn	1,624	46.6	▲2.3
Labour	Simon Speller	1,440	41.3	▲0.9
Liberal Democrats	Tom Wren	334	9.6	▲0.3
TUSC	Michael Malocco	88	2.5	▲0.5
Majority		184	5.3	▲1.4
Turnout		3,486	32.9	▲2.2
Conservative hold		Swing	▲0.7	

St Nicholas
Party	Candidate	Votes	%	±%
Conservative	Phil Bibby	1,658	42.0	▼2.8
Labour	Sandra Barr	1,540	39.0	▼0.0
Liberal Democrats	Neil Brinkworth	399	10.1	▲3.6
Green	Jacqueline Botevyle	222	5.6	▲2.2
Reform	Amodio Amato	71	1.8	N/A
TUSC	Amber Gentleman	59	1.5	▲0.5
Majority		118	3.0	▼2.8
Turnout		3,949	37.6	▲2.4
Conservative hold		Swing	▼1.4	

=== Three Rivers ===
Three Rivers District shown within Hertfordshire

The election was held alongside an election to Three Rivers District Council.

Three Rivers district summary
Party	Seats	+/-	Votes	%	+/-
Conservative	3	Steady	10,767	40.1	–0.9
Liberal Democrats	3	▲1	10,015	37.3	–1.7
Labour	0	▼1	3,634	13.5	+0.1
Green	0	Steady	2,260	8.4	+5.7
Independent	0	Steady	127	0.5	N/A
TUSC	0	Steady	32	0.1	N/A
Total	6	Steady	26,835		

Division results

Abbots Langley
Party	Candidate	Votes	%	±%
Liberal Democrats	Sara Bedford	2,061	48.5	▼10.4
Conservative	Andrew O'Brien	1,219	28.7	▲2.5
Labour	Helena Farrington	713	16.8	▲4.2
Green	Kelsey Trevett	257	6.0	▲3.7
Majority		842	19.8	▼12.9
Turnout		4,250	34.2	▲4.0
Liberal Democrats hold		Swing	▼6.4	

Croxley
Party	Candidate	Votes	%	±%
Liberal Democrats	Chris Lloyd	2,556	51.2	▼6.8
Conservative	Tony Walker	1,311	26.3	▲0.7
Green	Andrew Gallagher	822	16.5	▲13.4
Labour	Jeni Swift Gillett	302	6.1	▼2.7
Majority		1,245	24.9	▼7.5
Turnout		4,991	46.3	▲10.0
Liberal Democrats hold		Swing	▼3.8	

Rickmansworth East and Oxhey Park
Party	Candidate	Votes	%	±%
Conservative	Reena Ranger	2,490	54.7	▼6.9
Liberal Democrats	Tom Smith	1,047	23.0	▲1.5
Labour	William Waite	635	13.9	▲4.3
Green	Alfie Roberts	384	8.4	▲5.0
Majority		1,443	31.7	▼8.4
Turnout		4,556	39.5	▲4.6
Conservative hold		Swing	▼4.2	

Rickmansworth West
Party	Candidate	Votes	%	±%
Conservative	Paula Hiscocks	2,020	49.4	▲4.2
Liberal Democrats	Sarah Nelmes	1,472	36.0	▼7.5
Labour	Charlotte Smith	334	8.2	▲2.5
Green	Dmitri MacMillen	260	6.4	▲4.2
Majority		548	13.4	▲11.6
Turnout		4.086	37.2	▲2.9
Conservative hold		Swing	▲5.8	

South Oxhey and Eastbury
Party	Candidate	Votes	%	±%
Conservative	Christopher Alley	1,751	46.7	▲7.5
Labour	Stephen Cox	1,383	36.9	▼8.1
Liberal Democrats	Rhys Southall	411	11.0	▲4.4
Green	Chris Lawrence	174	4.6	▲2.7
TUSC	Richard Shattock	32	0.9	N/A
Majority		368	9.8	N/A
Turnout		3,751	31.0	▲1.2
Conservative gain from Labour		Swing	▲7.8	

Three Rivers Rural
Party	Candidate	Votes	%	±%
Liberal Democrats	Phil Williams	2,468	47.5	▲3.6
Conservative	Ciaran Reed	1,976	38.0	▼9.0
Green	Roger Stafford	363	7.0	▲4.0
Labour	Darren Steer	267	5.1	▲0.9
Independent	Simon Diggins	127	2.4	N/A
Majority		492	9.5	N/A
Turnout		5,201	43.6	▲3.3
Liberal Democrats gain from Conservative		Swing	▲6.3	

The Three Rivers Rural division had previously been gained by the Liberal Democrats in a 2018 by-election.

=== Watford ===
The Borough of Watford shown within Hertfordshire

The election was held alongside an election to Watford Borough Council.

Watford district summary
Party	Seats	+/-	Votes	%	+/-
Liberal Democrats	4	Steady	10,151	39.8	–4.9
Labour	2	Steady	7,632	29.9	+2.8
Conservative	0	Steady	6,895	27.0	+4.4
Green	0	Steady	515	2.0	–1.4
TUSC	0	Steady	182	0.7	+0.2
Reform UK	0	Steady	67	0.3	N/A
Heritage	0	Steady	60	0.2	N/A
Total	6	Steady	25,502		

Division results

Central Watford and Oxhey
Party	Candidate	Votes	%	±%
Liberal Democrats	Stephen Giles-Medhurst	2,130	48.8	▼4.7
Labour	Sophia Demetriou-Jones	1,020	23.4	▲1.0
Conservative	Joseph Gornicki	848	19.4	▼0.9
Green	Mark Rutherford	297	6.8	▲6.2
Reform	Neal Webber	67	1.5	N/A
Majority		1,110	25.4	▼5.6
Turnout		4,362	34.0	▲5.4
Liberal Democrats hold		Swing	▼2.8	

Meriden Tudor
Party	Candidate	Votes	%	±%
Liberal Democrats	Stephen Cavinder	1,433	41.0	▼8.5
Conservative	Prashanth Elangovan	1,145	32.8	▲3.2
Labour	Seamus Williams	916	26.2	▲8.7
Majority		288	8.2	▼11.7
Turnout		3,494	32.7	▲2.7
Liberal Democrats hold		Swing	▼5.9	

Nascot Park
Party	Candidate	Votes	%	±%
Liberal Democrats	Mark Watkin	2,733	50.9	▼1.7
Conservative	Linda Topping	1,800	33.5	▲0.3
Labour	Nabila Ahmed	841	15.6	▲6.4
Majority		933	17.4	▼2.0
Turnout		5,374	42.0	▲2.8
Liberal Democrats hold		Swing	▼1.0	

North Watford
Party	Candidate	Votes	%	±%
Labour	Asif Khan	1,814	40.5	▼0.8
Liberal Democrats	Dawn Allen-Williamson	1,388	31.0	▼6.8
Conservative	Anthony Parker	935	20.9	▲6.9
Green	Catherine Grinsted	218	4.9	▼2.1
TUSC	Derek Foster	66	1.5	N/A
Heritage	Sarah Knott	60	1.3	N/A
Majority		426	9.5	▲6.0
Turnout		4,481	37.3	▲2.0
Labour hold		Swing	▲3.0	

West Watford
Party	Candidate	Votes	%	±%
Labour	Nigel Bell	2,399	55.1	▼7.5
Conservative	Abbas Merali	1,089	25.0	▲12.5
Liberal Democrats	Jennifer Pattinson	746	17.1	▼5.5
TUSC	Mark O'Connor	116	2.7	▲0.6
Majority		1,310	30.1	▼9.8
Turnout		4,350	33.6	▲6.4
Labour hold		Swing	▼10.0	

Woodside Stanborough
Party	Candidate	Votes	%	±%
Liberal Democrats	Tim Williams	1,721	50.0	▼1.5
Conservative	Peter Williams	1,078	31.3	▲6.9
Labour	Nevin Atasoy	642	18.7	▲3.6
Majority		643	18.7	▼8.3
Turnout		3,441	31.2	▲1.5
Liberal Democrats hold		Swing	▼4.2	

=== Welwyn Hatfield ===
The Borough of Welwyn Hatfield shown within Hertfordshire

The election was held alongside an election to Welwyn Hatfield Borough Council.

Welwyn Hatfield district summary
Party	Seats	+/-	Votes	%	+/-
Conservative	8	▲4	14,280	48.8	+6.1
Labour	0	▼2	7,524	25.7	+1.9
Liberal Democrats	0	▼2	6,748	23.0	–2.3
Green	0	Steady	550	1.9	–0.6
Independent	0	Steady	179	0.6	+0.1
Total	8	Steady	29,281		

Division results

Haldens
Party	Candidate	Votes	%	±%
Conservative	Sunny Thusu	1,773	41.4	▲6.3
Liberal Democrats	Ayesha Rohale	1,285	30.0	▼7.4
Labour	Mike Larkins	1,228	28.7	▲5.2
Majority		488	11.4	N/A
Turnout		4,286	39.9	0.0
Conservative gain from Liberal Democrats		Swing	▲6.8	

Handside and Peartree
Party	Candidate	Votes	%	±%
Conservative	Fiona Thomson	1,800	39.4	▲11.3
Liberal Democrats	Nigel Quinton	1,753	38.4	▼9.3
Labour	Alan Chesterman	1,015	22.2	▲4.9
Majority		47	1.0	N/A
Turnout		4,568	38.7	▲0.3
Conservative gain from Liberal Democrats		Swing	▲10.3	

Hatfield East
Party	Candidate	Votes	%	±%
Conservative	Peter Hebden	1,239	44.4	▲4.6
Labour	Glyn Hayes	824	29.5	▼6.6
Liberal Democrats	Jackie Brennan	730	26.1	▲17.1
Majority		415	14.9	▲11.2
Turnout		2,793	30.3	▼1.7
Conservative hold		Swing	▲5.6	

Hatfield North
Party	Candidate	Votes	%	±%
Conservative	James Bond	1,119	43.9	▲9.0
Labour	Margaret Eames-Petersen	1,029	40.4	▼0.9
Liberal Democrats	Adam Edwards	220	8.6	▼2.3
Abolish the Town Council Party	Melvyn Jones	179	7.0	N/A
Majority		90	3.5	N/A
Turnout		2,547	26.7	▼0.6
Conservative gain from Labour		Swing	▲5.0	

Hatfield Rural
Party	Candidate	Votes	%	±%
Conservative	Stephen Boulton	2,903	74.4	▲5.8
Labour	Graham Beevers	538	13.8	▲5.5
Liberal Democrats	Peter Basford	463	11.8	▼5.2
Majority		2,365	60.6	▲0.3
Turnout		3,904	39.5	▲4.0
Conservative hold		Swing	▲0.2	

Hatfield South
Party	Candidate	Votes	%	±%
Liberal Democrats	Paul Zukowskyj	1,293	44.6	▼5.9
Conservative	Gavriel Solomons	1,011	34.9	▲5.5
Labour	Moyna Aicken	594	20.5	▲2.7
Majority		282	9.7	▼11.4
Turnout		2,898	32.9	▲0.5
Liberal Democrats hold		Swing	▼5.7	

Welwyn
Party	Candidate	Votes	%	±%
Conservative	Tony Kingsbury	2,674	57.6	▼3.3
Labour	Daniel Carlen	800	17.2	▲1.6
Liberal Democrats	Frank Marsh	620	13.4	▼0.1
Green	Penny Berrington	550	11.8	▲7.1
Majority		1,874	40.4	▼4.9
Turnout		4,644	40.8	▲2.1
Conservative hold		Swing	▼2.5	

Welwyn Garden City South
Party	Candidate	Votes	%	±%
Conservative	Marios Artemi	1,761	48.4	▲9.2
Labour	Lynn Chesterman	1,496	41.1	▼0.2
Liberal Democrats	Christopher Corbey-West	384	10.5	▲1.8
Majority		265	7.3	N/A
Turnout		3,641	32.1	▲0.8
Conservative gain from Labour		Swing	▲4.7	

== By-elections ==
Hitchin South: 10 March 2022
Party	Candidate	Votes	%	±%
Liberal Democrats	Keith Hoskins	2,401	71.7	+34.0
Conservative	Claire Strong	690	20.6	−16.3
Green	Deolinda Eltringham	223	6.7	−2.2
CPA	Leigh Smith	35	1.0	±0.0
Majority		1,711	51.1	+50.3
Turnout		3,363	31.4	−15.6
Liberal Democrats hold		Swing	▲25.2	

Hitchin North: 9th February 2023
Party	Candidate	Votes	%	±%
Labour	Ian Albert	1,992	65.8	+16.4
Conservative	Ralph Muncer	526	17.4	−10.6
Green	Deolinda Eltringham	415	13.7	+3.4
CPA	Leigh Smith	93	3.1	+1.7
Majority		1,466	48.4	+22.5
Turnout		3026	26.2	−16.9
Labour hold		Swing	▲13.5	

Harpenden Rural: 7 December 2023
Party	Candidate	Votes	%	±%
Liberal Democrats	Allison Wren	1,474	58.2	+32.9
Conservative	Claudio Duran	766	30.3	−26.8
Labour	Symon Vegro	168	6.7	−4.0
Green	Mario May	119	4.8	−2.1
Majority		708	27.9	N/A
Turnout		2,538	22.6	−21.6
Liberal Democrats gain from Conservative		Swing	▲29.8	

Bedwell: 29 August 2024
Party	Candidate	Votes	%	±%
Labour	Ellie Plater	962	46.9	–0.6
Conservative	Harry Curtis	470	22.9	–11.7
Reform	Janet Bainbridge	352	17.2	N/A
Liberal Democrats	Riad Mannan	134	6.5	–3.2
Green	Balgiisa Ahmed	133	6.5	+0.5
Majority		492	24.0	+11.1
Turnout		2,054	18.4	–15.0
Registered electors		11,157		
Labour hold		Swing	▲5.6	
