= 2010 Three Rivers District Council election =

2010 English local government election

Map of the 2010 Three Rivers District Council election

The 2010 Three Rivers District Council election took place on 6 May 2010 to elect a third of the members of Three Rivers District Council, the council of Three Rivers District in Hertfordshire, England. This was on the same day as the other local elections across England as well as the 2010 United Kingdom general election. The previous council election took place in 2008 and the following election was held in 2011. In the election, the council stayed under Liberal Democrat majority control.

== Councillors not standing for re-election ==
Councillors not standing for re-election included:

- Francis Durham - Labour (Northwick)
- Richard Struck - Liberal Democrat (Maple Cross and Mill End)
- Leonard Spencer - Conservative (Chorleywood East)
- Keith Peutherer - Liberal Democrat representative (Langleybury)

== Results ==
Party	Previous	Seats +/-	2010
Liberal Democrat	31	▼1	30
Conservative	12	▲2	14
Labour	4	▼1	3
British National Party	1	Steady	1

== See also ==
- Three Rivers District Council elections
