= Politics of Three Rivers District =

The politics of Three Rivers, a district in England, are played out at local, Hertfordshire-wide, and parliamentary levels. Three Rivers is a non-metropolitan district governed locally by a district council composed of 39 councillors that is responsible for such services as housing, waste disposal, and local planning. The district is represented by six members on the 77-councillor Hertfordshire County Council, which is responsible for such services as education, transport, and social services.

The three major parties are all competitive in different parts of Three Rivers and at different levels of representation. Three Rivers district council is under no overall control, with the Lib Dems holding 49% of district councillors. The Conservatives are second-largest, have most votes in the last election, and hold three of the district's six county councillors. Labour, whilst a distant third at both district and county level in Three Rivers, hold sway in South Oxhey.

Three Rivers is represented in Parliament by three Members of Parliament. Most of the district is within the South West Hertfordshire constituency, represented by Conservative Gagan Mohindra. Smaller parts of the district are represented by Daisy Cooper (St Albans, Liberal Democrat) and Matt Turmaine (Watford, Labour).

== District council ==
Three Rivers is a non-metropolitan district that elects one-third of its councillors at any one time: three times every four years, with the fourth for elections to Hertfordshire County Council). In the 2008 election, the council remained under Liberal Democrat control, having been first won by the Lib Dems from no overall control in 1999. The Conservatives are second strongest, whilst Labour have been reduced to a small contingent over the past ten years. The British National Party won its first seat in Three Rivers in 2008.

As of the 2018 elections, the composition of the council is:

Party	Councillors	Change (on 2007)
Liberal Democrats	20	0
Conservative	16	+1
Labour	3	-2
Total	48	-
Source: BBC News

== County council ==
For elections to Hertfordshire County Council, the district is divided into six divisions, three of which are held by the Conservatives, two by the Liberal Democrats, and one by the BNP:

Seat	Councillor	Party	Wards
Abbots Langley	Paul Goggins	Liberal Democrats	Abbots Langley, Bedmond and Primrose Hill, Langleybury (part), Leavesden
Chorleywood	Chris Hayward	Conservative	Chorleywood East, Chorleywood West, Langleybury (part), Sarratt
Croxley	David Drury	Liberal Democrats	Croxley Green, Croxley Green North, Croxley Green South
Oxhey Park	Frances Button	Conservative	Carpenders Park, Moor Park and Eastbury, Oxhey Hall
Rickmansworth	Barbara Lamb	Conservative	Maple Cross and Mill End, Penn, Rickmansworth, Rickmansworth West
South Oxhey	Deirdre Gates	BNP	Ashridge, Hayling, Northwick
Source: Hertfordshire County Council

== Parliament ==
For parliamentary elections, the district is divided across three constituencies. Most of the district is within the South West Hertfordshire constituency, which is considered a safe Conservative seat and held by a Conservative MP (currently Gagan Mohindra) since its creation in 1950. The eastern parts of the constituency, to the north and south of Watford, are part of that borough's constituency, which is currently held by Labour’s Matt Turmaine, having fluctuated between Labour and the Conservatives. Most of the north-eastern ward of Bedmond and Primrose Hill is in the St Albans constituency, which is currently held by the Lib Dem Daisy Cooper.

Seat	MP	Party	Wards
St Albans	Daisy Cooper	Liberal Democrats	Bedmond and Primrose Hill (part)
South West Hertfordshire	Gagan Mohindra	Conservative	Ashridge, Chorleywood East, Chorleywood West, Croxley Green, Croxley Green North, Croxley Green South, Hayling, Maple Cross and Mill End, Moor Park and Eastbury, Northwick, Penn, Rickmansworth, Rickmansworth West, Sarratt
Watford	Matt Turmaine	Labour	Abbots Langley, Bedmond and Primrose Hill (part), Carpenders Park, Langleybury, Leavesden, Oxhey Hall
Source: Boundary Commission for England
