= 2007 Three Rivers District Council election =

Election in southern England

Results of the 2007 Three Rivers District Council election

Elections to Three Rivers Council were held on 3 May 2007. One third of the council was up for election and the Liberal Democrat party stayed in overall control of the council.

After the election, the composition of the council was:

- Liberal Democrat 31
- Conservative 11
- Labour 6

== Election result ==
Three Rivers local election result 2007
Party	Seats	Gains	Losses	Net gain/loss	Seats %	Votes %	Votes	+/−
Liberal Democrats	11	1	0	+1	68.8	54.9	10,216	+8.5%
Conservative	3	1	1	0	18.8	35.7	6,653	-8.5%
Labour	2	0	1	-1	12.5	7.7	1,439	-0.4%
Green	0	0	0	0	0	1.0	179	+0.7%
UKIP	0	0	0	0	0	0.7	125	+0.2%

== Ward results ==
Abbots Langley
Party	Candidate	Votes	%	±%
Liberal Democrats	Matthew Bedford	1,028	67.8	+10.9
Conservative	Andy Woodard	401	26.4	−8.0
Labour	Bruce Prochnik	88	5.8	−2.9
Majority		627	41.4	+18.9
Turnout		1,517	41.5	−2.1
Liberal Democrats hold		Swing		

Ashridge
Party	Candidate	Votes	%	±%
Conservative	Graham Denman	241	43.9	+10.5
Labour	Nena Spellen	231	42.1	+2.6
Liberal Democrats	Gabriel Aitman	77	14.0	−13.0
Majority		10	1.8	−4.3
Turnout		549	22.3	−6.5
Conservative gain from Labour		Swing		

Bedmond and Primrose Hill
Party	Candidate	Votes	%	±%
Liberal Democrats	Richard Laval	525	59.3	+0.4
Conservative	Claire Woodard	281	31.8	+6.3
Labour	Stephen Cox	79	8.9	+0.5
Majority		244	27.5	−5.9
Turnout		885	33.2	−9.4
Liberal Democrats hold		Swing		

Carpenders Park
Party	Candidate	Votes	%	±%
Liberal Democrats	Pam Hames	1,003	60.9	+7.6
Conservative	Craig Lewell	448	27.2	−12.4
UKIP	Andrew Shanks	125	7.6	+7.6
Labour	Stephen King	72	4.4	−2.7
Majority		555	33.7	+20.0
Turnout		1,648	41.4	−7.3
Liberal Democrats hold		Swing		

Chorleywood West
Party	Candidate	Votes	%	±%
Liberal Democrats	Barbara Green	1,163	53.5	+0.3
Conservative	Richard Booth	933	42.9	+4.2
Green	Tina Kamei	78	3.6	+0.5
Majority		230	10.6	−3.9
Turnout		2,174	53.0	−4.2
Liberal Democrats hold		Swing		

Croxley Green
Party	Candidate	Votes	%	±%
Liberal Democrats	Leighton Dann	977	60.6	+4.1
Conservative	Mark Englefield	512	31.8	−5.1
Labour	David Wynne-Jones	123	7.6	+0.9
Majority		465	28.8	+9.6
Turnout		1,612	38.5	−9.6
Liberal Democrats hold		Swing		

Croxley Green North
Party	Candidate	Votes	%	±%
Liberal Democrats	Christopher Lloyd	841	76.0	+23.7
Conservative	David Redman	266	24.0	−16.3
Majority		575	52.0	+40.0
Turnout		1,107	43.0	−1.5
Liberal Democrats hold		Swing		

Croxley Green South
Party	Candidate	Votes	%	±%
Liberal Democrats	Philip Brading	705	75.2	+8.0
Conservative	Jacqueline Worrall	233	24.8	+0.1
Majority		472	50.4	+5.9
Turnout		938	36.0	−7.0
Liberal Democrats hold		Swing		

Hayling
Party	Candidate	Votes	%	±%
Labour	Phil Redshaw	274	52.4	−5.1
Conservative	Malcolm Butwick	162	31.0	+8.0
Liberal Democrats	David Lowes	87	16.6	−2.9
Majority		112	21.4	−13.1
Turnout		523	21.2	−9.4
Labour hold		Swing		

Langleybury
Party	Candidate	Votes	%	±%
Liberal Democrats	Paul Goggins	839	68.3	+2.9
Conservative	Barbara Brockhurst	244	19.9	−3.5
Labour	John Sutton	146	11.9	+0.7
Majority		595	48.4	+6.4
Turnout		1,229	34.7	−2.9
Liberal Democrats hold		Swing		

Leavesden
Party	Candidate	Votes	%	±%
Liberal Democrats	Stephen Giles-Medhurst	952	77.0	+11.8
Conservative	Wally Tuck	217	17.6	−8.1
Labour	Peter Arthur	67	5.4	−3.7
Majority		735	59.4	+19.9
Turnout		1,236	31.7	−2.2
Liberal Democrats hold		Swing		

Maple Cross and Mill End
Party	Candidate	Votes	%	±%
Liberal Democrats	Ann Shaw	819	69.9	+13.3
Conservative	Edna Nicholls	353	30.1	−4.8
Majority		466	39.8	+18.1
Turnout		1,172	32.2	−3.4
Liberal Democrats hold		Swing		

Moor Park and Eastbury
Party	Candidate	Votes	%	±%
Conservative	Ralph Sangster	1,096	76.9	−0.8
Liberal Democrats	Jeremy Asquith	229	16.1	−0.4
Green	Andy Lewis	101	7.1	+7.1
Majority		867	60.8	−0.4
Turnout		1,426	32.8	−10.9
Conservative hold		Swing		

Northwick
Party	Candidate	Votes	%	±%
Labour	Ron Spellen	299	36.8	−2.5
Conservative	Alistair Macdonald	268	33.0	+11.0
Liberal Democrats	Alan Feldman	246	30.3	−8.3
Majority		31	3.8	+3.1
Turnout		813	23.5	−4.2
Labour hold		Swing		

Oxhey Hall
Party	Candidate	Votes	%	±%
Liberal Democrats	Peter Ray	589	55.3	+9.0
Conservative	Roy Clements	417	39.1	−4.0
Labour	Sheila Bull	60	5.6	−5.0
Majority		172	16.2	+13.0
Turnout		1,066	42.4	+0.8
Liberal Democrats gain from Conservative		Swing		

Sarratt
Party	Candidate	Votes	%	±%
Conservative	Tony Barton	581	81.0	+5.6
Liberal Democrats	Sue Stibbs	136	19.0	−5.6
Majority		445	62.0	+11.2
Turnout		717	48.1	+7.2
Conservative hold		Swing		
