= 2006 Three Rivers District Council election =

2006 UK local government election

Results of the 2006 Three Rivers District Council election

Elections to Three Rivers Council were held on 4 May 2006. One third of the council was up for election and the Liberal Democrat party stayed in overall control of the council.

After the election, the composition of the council was:

- Liberal Democrat 30
- Conservative 11
- Labour 7

== Election result ==
Three Rivers local election result 2006
Party	Seats	Gains	Losses	Net gain/loss	Seats %	Votes %	Votes	+/−
Liberal Democrats	11	1	0	+1	68.8	46.4	10,274	+0.6%
Conservative	4	0	1	-1	25.0	44.2	9,792	+1.3%
Labour	1	0	0	0	6.1	8.1	1,794	-3.2%
UKIP	0	0	0	0	0	0.5	104	+0.5%
English Democrat	0	0	0	0	0	0.5	101	+0.5%
Green	0	0	0	0	0	0.3	72	+0.3%
New Party	0	0	0	0	0	0.1	13	+0.1%

== Ward results ==
Abbots Langley
Party	Candidate	Votes	%	±%
Liberal Democrats	Sara Bedford	846	56.9	−3.3
Conservative	Andrew Woodard	511	34.4	+7.7
Labour	Jeannie Mehta	130	8.7	−4.4
Majority		335	22.5	−11.0
Turnout		1,487	43.6	+2.2
Liberal Democrats hold		Swing		

Bedmond and Primrose Hill
Party	Candidate	Votes	%	±%
Liberal Democrats	Joy Mann	600	58.9	−7.2
Conservative	Simon Fancourt	260	25.5	+4.2
Labour	Stephen Cox	86	8.4	−4.2
UKIP	Richard Evans	73	7.2	+7.2
Majority		340	33.4	−11.4
Turnout		1,019	42.6	+11.1
Liberal Democrats hold		Swing		

Carpenders Park
Party	Candidate	Votes	%	±%
Liberal Democrats	Mary Connolly	976	53.3	−6.0
Conservative	Craig Lewell	725	39.6	+6.1
Labour	Sarah Linhart	130	7.1	−0.1
Majority		251	13.7	−12.1
Turnout		1,831	48.7	−2.6
Liberal Democrats gain from Conservative		Swing		

Chorleywood East
Party	Candidate	Votes	%	±%
Conservative	Leonard Spencer	991	78.7	+4.4
Liberal Democrats	Michael Colin	228	18.1	−7.6
Labour	David Williams	41	3.3	+3.3
Majority		763	60.6	+12.0
Turnout		1,260	41.3	−4.8
Conservative hold		Swing		

Chorleywood West
Party	Candidate	Votes	%	±%
Liberal Democrats	Martin Trevett	1,221	53.2	+3.8
Conservative	Richard Booth	888	38.7	−6.0
Green	Tina Kamei	72	3.1	+3.1
Labour	Fiona Goble	69	3.0	+3.0
UKIP	Andrew Shanks	31	1.4	+1.4
New Party	Joanne Dooley	13	0.6	+0.6
Majority		333	14.5	+9.8
Turnout		2,294	57.2	−4.1
Liberal Democrats hold		Swing		

Croxley Green
Party	Candidate	Votes	%	±%
Liberal Democrats	Roger Seabourne	1,087	56.5	+2.0
Conservative	Mark Englefield	709	36.9	+2.7
Labour	David Wynne-Jones	128	6.7	−4.6
Majority		378	19.6	−0.7
Turnout		1,924	48.1	+3.1
Liberal Democrats hold		Swing		

Croxley Green North
Party	Candidate	Votes	%	±%
Liberal Democrats	David Drury	581	52.3	−20.7
Conservative	Paula Hiscocks	448	40.3	+23.6
Labour	Stephen King	82	7.4	−2.9
Majority		133	12.0	−44.3
Turnout		1,111	44.5	+7.3
Liberal Democrats hold		Swing		

Croxley Green South
Party	Candidate	Votes	%	±%
Liberal Democrats	Brian White	732	67.2	0.0
Conservative	Graham Denman	269	24.7	+6.2
Labour	Maureen Sedlacek	88	8.1	−6.1
Majority		463	44.5	−4.2
Turnout		1,089	43.0	+13.6
Liberal Democrats hold		Swing		

Langlebury
Party	Candidate	Votes	%	±%
Liberal Democrats	William Peutherer	820	65.4	+2.9
Conservative	Margaret Lambert	293	23.4	+1.0
Labour	Jacqueline Williams	140	11.2	−3.9
Majority		527	42.0	+1.9
Turnout		1,253	37.6	−0.9
Liberal Democrats hold		Swing		

Leavesden
Party	Candidate	Votes	%	±%
Liberal Democrats	Katherine Turner	831	65.2	+5.9
Conservative	Walter Tuck	328	25.7	−4.4
Labour	Peter Arthur	116	9.1	−1.6
Majority		503	39.5	+10.3
Turnout		1,275	33.9	−0.1
Liberal Democrats hold		Swing		

Maple Cross and Mill End
Party	Candidate	Votes	%	±%
Liberal Democrats	Richard Struck	736	56.6	−8.1
Conservative	Kerry Christlow	454	34.9	−0.4
Labour	Joanne Cox	111	8.5	+8.5
Majority		282	21.7	−7.7
Turnout		1,301	35.6	−1.7
Liberal Democrats hold		Swing		

Moor Park and Eastbury
Party	Candidate	Votes	%	±%
Conservative	Kemal Butt	1,379	77.7	+3.1
Liberal Democrats	Jeremy Asquith	293	16.5	−8.9
Labour	Jayshree Radia	102	5.7	+5.7
Majority		1,086	61.2	+12.0
Turnout		1,774	43.7	+0.3
Conservative hold		Swing		

Northwick
Party	Candidate	Votes	%	±%
Labour	Francis Durham	321	39.3	−4.1
Liberal Democrats	David Lowes	315	38.6	+12.1
Conservative	Ralph Sangster	181	22.2	−7.9
Majority		6	0.7	−12.6
Turnout		817	27.7	+0.2
Labour hold		Swing		

Penn
Party	Candidate	Votes	%	±%
Liberal Democrats	Leslie Mead	550	56.0	
Conservative	Robin Noakes	264	26.9	
English Democrat	Nicholas Capp	101	10.3	
Labour	Bruce Prochnik	68	6.9	
Majority		286	29.1	
Turnout		983	42.4	+0.6
Liberal Democrats hold		Swing		

Rickmansworth
Party	Candidate	Votes	%	±%
Conservative	Mark Weedon	1,041	76.4	+14.2
Liberal Democrats	Anthony Humphreys	209	15.3	−10.7
Labour	Karen McIntosh	112	8.2	−3.7
Majority		832	61.1	+24.9
Turnout		1,362	44.1	+2.1
Conservative hold		Swing		

Rickmansworth West
Party	Candidate	Votes	%	±%
Conservative	Barbara Lamb	1,051	76.8	+16.9
Liberal Democrats	Jill Swainson	249	18.2	−17.4
Labour	Paul Williams	69	5.0	+0.5
Majority		802	58.6	+34.3
Turnout		1,369	50.1	−1.3
Conservative hold		Swing		
