= 2021 Three Rivers District Council election =

2021 UK local government election

- 6 May 2021

13 of 39 seats to Three Rivers District Council 20 seats needed for a majority
	First party	Second party	Third party
Party	Liberal Democrats	Conservative	Labour
Seats before	23	11	3
Seats won	8	4	1
Seats after	23	11	3
Seat change	0	0	0
Popular vote	10,239	10,087	3,379
Percentage	38.2%	37.6%	12.6%
- Map showing the results of the 2021 Three Rivers District Council election.
Council control before election
Liberal Democrats
Council control after election
Liberal Democrats

Elections to Three Rivers District Council took place on 6 May 2021 alongside other local elections in the United Kingdom. 13 of the 39 seats were elected: the seats elected were last contested in the 2016 election. The election was originally scheduled to take place on 7 May 2020, however elections were delayed nationwide by one year due to the COVID-19 pandemic.

The Liberal Democrats held control of the council.

== Results summary ==
2021 Three Rivers District Council election
Party	This election				Full council			This election		
Party	Candidates	Seats	Net	Seats %	Other	Total	Total %	Votes	Votes %	+/−
Liberal Democrats	{{{candidates}}}	8	Steady	61.5	15	23	59.0	10,239	38.2	-0.7
Conservative	{{{candidates}}}	4	Steady	30.8	7	11	28.2	10,087	37.6	+2.0
Labour	{{{candidates}}}	1	Steady	7.7	2	3	7.7	3,379	12.6	-4.2
Independent	{{{candidates}}}	0	Steady	0.0	2	2	5.1	319	1.2	N/A
Green	{{{candidates}}}	0	Steady	0.0	0	0	0.0	2,646	9.9	New
UK Voice	{{{candidates}}}	0	Steady	0.0	0	0	0.0	115	0.4	New
TUSC	{{{candidates}}}	0	Steady	0.0	0	0	0.0	7	<0.1	New

== Results by ward ==
=== Abbots Langley and Bedmond ===
Abbots Langley and Bedmond
Party	Candidate	Votes	%	±%
Liberal Democrats	Matthew Bedford	989	50.4	▼6.2
Conservative	Andrew O'Brien	580	29.5	▲8.1
Labour	Helena Farrington	264	13.4	▲1.2
Green	Michael Rayment	130	6.6	N/A
Majority		409	20.8	▼14.2
Turnout		1,963	39.2	▲2.5
Liberal Democrats hold		Swing	▼7.1	

=== Carpenders Park ===
Carpenders Park
Party	Candidate	Votes	%	±%
Conservative	David Coltman	1,031	55.9	▲9.0
Labour	William Waite	384	20.8	▲2.7
Liberal Democrats	Geoff Dunne	240	13.0	▼13.2
UK Voice	Kajalbala Usadadiya	115	6.2	N/A
Green	Kelsey Trevett	74	4.0	N/A
Majority		647	35.1	
Turnout		1,844	34.4	
Conservative hold		Swing		

=== Chorleywood North and Sarratt ===
Chorleywood North and Sarratt
Party	Candidate	Votes	%	±%
Conservative	Ciaran Reed	1,356	57.6	▼15.2
Liberal Democrats	Ben Trevett	554	23.5	▲10.6
Independent	David Zerny	202	8.6	N/A
Green	Peter Loader	155	6.6	N/A
Labour	Margaret Gallagher	89	3.8	▼2.7
Majority		802	34.0	▼25.9
Turnout		2,356	40.4	▲8.4
Conservative hold		Swing	▼12.9	

=== Chorleywood South and Maple Cross ===
Chorleywood South and Maple Cross
Party	Candidate	Votes	%	±%
Liberal Democrats	Phil Williams	1,632	58.3	▼0.8
Conservative	Philip Hearn	893	31.9	▲3.3
Green	Roger Stafford	165	5.9	N/A
Labour	Iain Roden	111	4.0	▼3.2
Majority		739	26.4	▼4.1
Turnout		2,801	47.6	▲5.9
Liberal Democrats hold		Swing	▼2.0	

=== Dickinsons ===
Dickinsons
Party	Candidate	Votes	%	±%
Liberal Democrats	Paul Rainbow	1,078	43.0	▼13.4
Green	Chris Mitchell	961	38.4	N/A
Conservative	Rupert Barnes	370	14.8	▼13.2
Labour	Jeni Swift Gillett	96	3.8	▼11.8
Majority		117	4.7	▼23.9
Turnout		2,505	48.6	▲13.1
Liberal Democrats hold		Swing	▼25.9	

=== Durrants ===
Durrants
Party	Candidate	Votes	%	±%
Liberal Democrats	Chris Lloyd	1,179	51.3	▼21.9
Conservative	Tony Walker	735	32.0	▲14.7
Green	Andrew Gallagher	247	10.7	N/A
Labour	John Grillo	137	6.0	▼3.5
Majority		444	19.3	▼36.6
Turnout		2,298	45.2	▲6.8
Liberal Democrats hold		Swing	▼18.3	

=== Gade Valley ===
Gade Valley
Party	Candidate	Votes	%	±%
Liberal Democrats	Ruth Clark	740	46.1	▼15.6
Conservative	Matthew Cawthorne	389	24.3	▼1.1
Labour	Darren Steer	236	14.7	▲1.8
Green	Emma Brading	122	7.6	N/A
Independent	Belinda Phipps	117	7.3	N/A
Majority		351	21.9	▼14.5
Turnout		1,604	31.3	▼0.5
Liberal Democrats hold		Swing	▼7.2	

=== Leavesden ===
Leavesden
Party	Candidate	Votes	%	±%
Liberal Democrats	Stephen Giles-Medhurst	951	50.3	▼3.9
Conservative	Hitesh Taylor	548	29.0	▲10.1
Labour	Marie-Louise Nolan	280	14.8	▲0.5
Green	Bruce Perry	111	5.9	N/A
Majority		403	21.3	▼13.9
Turnout		1,890	31.8	▲0.9
Liberal Democrats hold		Swing	▼7.0	

=== Moor Park and Eastbury ===
Moor Park and Eastbury
Party	Candidate	Votes	%	±%
Conservative	Debbie Morris	1,317	72.2	▼3.7
Liberal Democrats	Jerry Asquith	227	12.4	▲1.7
Labour	Paul Gordon	142	7.8	▼1.2
Green	Deesha Chandra	138	7.6	N/A
Majority		1,090	59.8	▼5.4
Turnout		1,824	39.1	▲4.8
Conservative hold		Swing	▼2.7	

=== Oxhey Hall and Hayling ===
Oxhey Hall and Hayling
Party	Candidate	Votes	%	±%
Liberal Democrats	Andrew Scarth	1,137	54.7	▲6.9
Conservative	George Hallam-Attree	443	21.3	▼4.3
Labour	Clare Leahy	423	20.3	▲2.9
Green	Mary Chabrel	77	3.7	N/A
Majority		694	33.4	▲11.2
Turnout		2,080	38.4	▲0.4
Liberal Democrats hold		Swing	▲5.6	

=== Penn and Mill End ===
Penn and Mill End
Party	Candidate	Votes	%	±%
Liberal Democrats	Roger Seabourne	846	46.8	▲0.9
Conservative	Di Barber	670	37.0	▲5.6
Labour	Colin Gray	158	8.7	▼1.3
Green	Alfie Roberts	135	7.5	N/A
Majority		176	9.7	▼4.7
Turnout		1,809	34.4	▲1.6
Liberal Democrats hold		Swing	▼2.4	

=== Rickmansworth Town ===
Rickmansworth Town
Party	Candidate	Votes	%	±%
Conservative	Lisa Hudson	1,260	53.2	▲0.4
Liberal Democrats	Tom Smith	601	25.4	▲0.3
Green	Dmitri Macmillen	256	10.8	N/A
Labour	Charlotte Smith	250	10.6	▼4.1
Majority		659	27.8	▲0.1
Turnout		2,367	41.4	▲5.8
Conservative hold		Swing	▲0.0	

=== South Oxhey ===
South Oxhey
Party	Candidate	Votes	%	±%
Labour	Joan King	809	55.8	▲2.4
Conservative	Daniel Oakey	495	34.1	▲17.0
Green	Chris Lawrence	75	5.2	N/A
Liberal Democrats	Rhys Southall	65	4.5	▼0.2
TUSC	Richard Shattock	7	0.5	N/A
Majority		314	21.7	
Turnout		1,451	27.5	
Labour hold		Swing		
