= 2003 Three Rivers District Council election =

2003 UK local government election

Results of the 2003 Three Rivers District Council election

Elections to Three Rivers Council were held on 1 May 2003. One third of the council was up for election and the Liberal Democrat party stayed in overall control of the council.

After the election, the composition of the council was:

- Liberal Democrat 27
- Conservative 14
- Labour 7

== Election result ==
Three Rivers local election result 2003
Party	Seats	Gains	Losses	Net gain/loss	Seats %	Votes %	Votes	+/−
Liberal Democrats	10			+1	62.5	50.0	7,651	+2.9%
Conservative	3			-1	18.8	36.0	5,518	-4.8%
Labour	3			0	18.8	14.0	2,148	+2.0%

== Ward results ==
Abbots Langley
Party	Candidate	Votes	%	±%
Liberal Democrats	Matthew Bedford	696	60.4	0.0
Conservative	Ronald Leveridge	266	23.1	−3.1
Labour	John Sutton	191	16.6	+3.2
Majority		430	37.3	+3.1
Turnout		1,153	32.7	−7.6

Ashridge
Party	Candidate	Votes	%	±%
Labour	Alice Spellen	279	61.3	
Conservative	Fiona Denman	114	25.1	
Liberal Democrats	Gabriel Aitman	62	13.6	
Majority		165	36.2	
Turnout		455	19.9	

Bedmond and Primrose Hill
Party	Candidate	Votes	%	±%
Liberal Democrats	Richard Laval	502	66.1	+21.4
Conservative	David Benetar	162	21.3	−12.8
Labour	Stephen Cox	96	12.6	−8.6
Majority		340	44.8	+34.2
Turnout		760	31.5	−12.2

Carpenders Park
Party	Candidate	Votes	%	±%
Liberal Democrats	Pamela Hames	707	53.7	+19.0
Conservative	Teresa Paddington	610	46.3	−19.0
Majority		97	7.4	
Turnout		1,317	34.5	−1.9

Chorleywood West
Party	Candidate	Votes	%	±%
Liberal Democrats	Christopher Brearley	975	50.5	−7.3
Conservative	Christopher Haywood	859	44.5	+13.6
Labour	Fiona Goble	95	4.9	−6.4
Majority		116	6.0	−20.9
Turnout		1,929	48.9	+0.1

Croxley Green
Party	Candidate	Votes	%	±%
Liberal Democrats	Leighton Dann	790	59.8	−1.1
Conservative	Graham Denman	369	27.9	+2.6
Labour	David Wynne-Jones	163	12.3	−1.5
Majority		421	31.9	−3.7
Turnout		1,322	32.7	−2.7

Croxley Green North
Party	Candidate	Votes	%	±%
Liberal Democrats	Christopher Lloyd	683	73.0	+9.1
Conservative	Mary Sangster	156	16.7	−0.4
Labour	Vivian Rhodie	96	10.3	−8.7
Majority		527	56.3	+11.4
Turnout		935	37.2	−1.3

Croxley Green South
Party	Candidate	Votes	%	±%
Liberal Democrats	Philip Brading	505	67.2	+3.8
Conservative	Juliet Pendlebury	139	18.5	−4.5
Labour	Beverley Hazell	107	14.2	+0.6
Majority		366	48.7	+8.3
Turnout		751	29.4	−4.1

Hayling
Party	Candidate	Votes	%	±%
Labour	Phillip Redshaw	254	53.0	
Conservative	Lynda Lewis	171	35.7	
Liberal Democrats	Anneliese Waugh	54	11.3	
Majority		83	17.3	
Turnout		479	20.6	

Langlebury
Party	Candidate	Votes	%	±%
Liberal Democrats	Paul Goggins	575	60.0	−4.5
Labour	Colin Douglas	204	21.3	+1.4
Conservative	Clarence Sciville	179	18.7	+3.1
Majority		371	38.7	−5.9
Turnout		958	28.4	−4.1

Leavesden
Party	Candidate	Votes	%	±%
Liberal Democrats	Stephen Giles-Medhurst	629	68.1	+4.8
Conservative	Walter Tuck	172	18.6	−2.4
Labour	Peter Arthur	123	13.3	−2.3
Majority		457	49.5	+7.2
Turnout		924	25.8	−2.8

Maple Cross and Mill End
Party	Candidate	Votes	%	±%
Liberal Democrats	Ann Shaw	712	60.4	+5.6
Conservative	John Marsh	320	27.2	−3.5
Labour	Graham Dale	146	12.4	−2.1
Majority		392	33.2	+9.1
Turnout		1,178	30.9	−2.2

Moor Park and Eastbury
Party	Candidate	Votes	%	±%
Conservative	Andrew Pendlebury	960	76.2	+5.4
Liberal Democrats	Jeremy Asquith	300	23.8	−5.4
Majority		660	52.4	+10.8
Turnout		1,260	31.4	−1.2

Northwick
Party	Candidate	Votes	%	±%
Labour	David Spellen	302	54.3	−8.8
Conservative	Ralph Sangster	169	30.4	+6.4
Liberal Democrats	David Lowes	85	15.3	+2.3
Majority		133	23.9	−15.2
Turnout		556	18.8	−2.8

Oxhey Hall
Party	Candidate	Votes	%	±%
Conservative	Roy Clements	424	56.8	
Liberal Democrats	Linden Sharpe	230	30.8	
Labour	Sheila Bull	92	12.3	
Majority		194	26.0	
Turnout		746	31.7	

Sarratt
Party	Candidate	Votes	%	±%
Conservative	Anthony Barton	448	75.4	
Liberal Democrats	Richard Killick	146	24.6	
Majority		302	50.8	
Turnout		594	40.9	
