= 2002 Three Rivers District Council election =

2002 UK local government election

Results of the 2002 Three Rivers District Council election

Elections to Three Rivers Council were held on 2 May 2002. One third of the council was up for election and the Liberal Democrat party stayed in overall control of the council.

After the election, the composition of the council was:

- Liberal Democrat 26
- Conservative 15
- Labour 7

== Election result ==
Three Rivers local election result 2002
Party	Seats	Gains	Losses	Net gain/loss	Seats %	Votes %	Votes	+/−
Liberal Democrats	10			0	58.8	47.1	9,435	
Conservative	6			0	35.3	40.8	8,169	
Labour	1			0	5.9	12.0	2,410	

== Ward results ==
Abbots Langley
Party	Candidate	Votes	%	±%
Liberal Democrats	Sara Bedford	862	60.4	
Conservative	Christopher Bond	373	26.2	
Labour	John Sutton	191	13.4	
Majority		489	34.2	
Turnout		1,426	40.3	

Bedmond and Primrose Hill
Party	Candidate	Votes	%	±%
Liberal Democrats	Joy Mann	480	44.7	
Conservative	Roy Beach	367	34.1	
Labour	Stephen Cox	228	21.2	
Majority		113	10.6	
Turnout		1,075	43.7	

Carpenders Park
Party	Candidate	Votes	%	±%
Conservative	Leslie Winters	929	65.3	
Liberal Democrats	Alison Scarth	493	34.7	
Majority		436	30.6	
Turnout		1,422	36.4	

Chorleywood East
Party	Candidate	Votes	%	±%
Conservative	Leonard Spencer	766	71.7	
Liberal Democrats	Rodney Kipps	302	28.3	
Majority		464	43.4	
Turnout		1,068	34.6	

Chorleywood West
Party	Candidate	Votes	%	±%
Liberal Democrats	Martin Trevett	1,146	57.8	
Conservative	Maximin Green	612	30.9	
Labour	Joanna Trevor	224	11.3	
Majority		534	26.9	
Turnout		1,982	48.8	

Croxley Green
Party	Candidate	Votes	%	±%
Liberal Democrats	Roger Seabourne	897	60.9	
Conservative	Graham Denman	373	25.3	
Labour	Vivian Rhodie	203	13.8	
Majority		524	35.6	
Turnout		1,473	35.4	

Croxley Green North
Party	Candidate	Votes	%	±%
Liberal Democrats	David Drury	624	63.9	
Labour	Kerron Cross	185	19.0	
Conservative	Lynda Lewis	167	17.1	
Majority		439	44.9	
Turnout		976	38.5	

Croxley Green South
Party	Candidate	Votes	%	±%
Liberal Democrats	Brian White	550	63.4	
Conservative	Fiona Denman	199	23.0	
Labour	Beverley Hazell	118	13.6	
Majority		351	40.4	
Turnout		867	33.5	

Langlebury
Party	Candidate	Votes	%	±%
Liberal Democrats	William Peutherer	750	64.5	
Labour	Joanne Cox	231	19.9	
Conservative	Clarence Sciville	181	15.6	
Majority		519	44.6	
Turnout		1,162	32.5	

Leavesden
Party	Candidate	Votes	%	±%
Liberal Democrats	Katherine Turner	632	63.3	
Conservative	Walter Tuck	210	21.0	
Labour	Peter Arthur	156	15.6	
Majority		422	42.3	
Turnout		998	28.6	

Maple Cross and Mill End
Party	Candidate	Votes	%	±%
Liberal Democrats	Richard Struck	711	54.8	
Conservative	John Marsh	399	30.7	
Labour	Michael Lamport	188	14.5	
Majority		312	24.1	
Turnout		1,298	33.1	

Moor Park and Eastbury
Party	Candidate	Votes	%	±%
Conservative	Elizabeth Boleat	940	70.8	
Liberal Democrats	Anneliese Waugh	388	29.2	
Majority		552	41.6	
Turnout		1,328	32.6	

Northwick
Party	Candidate	Votes	%	±%
Labour	Francis Durham	437	63.1	
Conservative	Ralph Sangster	166	24.0	
Liberal Democrats	David Lowes	90	13.0	
Majority		271	39.1	
Turnout		693	21.6	

Penn
Party	Candidate	Votes	%	±%
Liberal Democrats	Sheila Taylor	489	59.1	
Conservative	John Hayden	338	40.9	
Majority		151	18.2	
Turnout		827	34.6	

Rickmansworth (2)
Party	Candidate	Votes	%	±%
Conservative	John Hawswell	654		
Conservative	David Sansom	645		
Liberal Democrats	Beryl Stevenson	356		
Liberal Democrats	Jeremy Asquith	317		
Labour	Graham Dale	162		
Turnout		2,134	37.5	

Rickmansworth West
Party	Candidate	Votes	%	±%
Conservative	Barbara Lamb	850	66.1	
Liberal Democrats	Leslie Mead	348	27.1	
Labour	Fiona Goble	87	6.8	
Majority		502	39.0	
Turnout		1,285	45.5	
