= 2021 Broxbourne Borough Council election =

2021 UK local government election

2021 Broxbourne Borough Council Election
| ← 2019 | 6 May 2021 | 2022 → |

10 of the 30 seats to Broxbourne Borough Council 16 seats needed for a majority
| | First party | Second party |
|---|---|---|
| Party | Conservative | Labour |
| Seats before | 27 | 3 |
| Seats won | 0 | 0 |
| Seats after | 27 | 3 |
| Seat change | Steady | Steady |
| Popular vote | 13,761 | 5,608 |
| Percentage | 63.83% | 26.01% |
- Winner in each ward for the 2021 Broxbourne Borough Council election
Council control before election
Conservatives
Council control after election
Conservatives

The 2021 Broxbourne Borough Council election took place on 6 May 2021 to elect members of the Broxbourne Borough Council in Hertfordshire, England. One-third of the council was up for election, and the Conservatives maintained overall control of the council.

These seats were due to be contested in 2020 but were delayed by one year due to the COVID-19 pandemic.

== Results summary ==
2021 Broxbourne Borough Council election
| Party | This election | | | Full council | | | This election | | |
| Party | Seats | Net | Seats % | Other | Total | Total % | Votes | Votes % | +/− |
|---|---|---|---|---|---|---|---|---|---|
| Conservative | 9 | Steady | 90.0 | 18 | 27 | 90.0 | 13,761 | 63.8 | +6.3 |
| Labour | 1 | Steady | 10.0 | 2 | 3 | 10.0 | 5,608 | 26.0 | +2.6 |
| Liberal Democrats | 0 | Steady | 0.0 | 0 | 0 | 0.0 | 1,634 | 7.6 | -10.1 |
| Independent | 0 | Steady | 0.0 | 0 | 0 | 0.0 | 303 | 1.4 | N/A |
| Green | 0 | Steady | 0.0 | 0 | 0 | 0.0 | 252 | 1.2 | N/A |

== Council composition ==
Following the last election in 2019, the composition of the council was:

↓
| 27 | 3 |
| Conservative | Lab |

After the election, the composition of the council was:

↓
| 27 | 3 |
| Conservative | Lab |

Lab - Labour

== Ward results ==
Incumbent councillors are denoted by an asterisk (*)

=== Broxbourne and Hoddesdon South ===
Broxbourne and Hoddesdon South
| Party | Candidate | Votes | % | ±% |
|---|---|---|---|---|
| Conservative | David William Holliday* | 1,817 | 68.7 | +0.6 |
| Labour | Jean Terry Legg | 330 | 12.5 | +0.1 |
| Green | Helen Jane Austen | 252 | 9.5 | N/A |
| Liberal Democrats | Kirstie Jane Mounsteven de Rivaz | 244 | 9.2 | −10.0 |
| Majority | | 1,487 | 56.26 | |
| Turnout | | 2,643 | 36.42 | |
| Conservative hold | | Swing | | |

=== Cheshunt North ===
Cheshunt North
| Party | Candidate | Votes | % | ±% |
|---|---|---|---|---|
| Conservative | Linda Joy Russell* | 1,225 | 62.6 | +8.8 |
| Labour | Ian Martin Charles Dust | 528 | 27.0 | +5.9 |
| Liberal Democrats | Kostas Inchenko | 203 | 10.4 | −14.7 |
| Majority | | 697 | 35.64 | |
| Turnout | | 1,956 | 29.37 | |
| Conservative hold | | Swing | | |

=== Cheshunt South and Theobalds ===
Cheshunt South and Theobalds
| Party | Candidate | Votes | % | ±% |
|---|---|---|---|---|
| Conservative | Carol Ann Crump* | 1,112 | 52.9 | +7.0 |
| Labour | Andreas Kyriacos Georgiou | 687 | 32.7 | +3.6 |
| Independent | Cody McCormick | 303 | 14.4 | N/A |
| Majority | | 425 | 20.22 | |
| Turnout | | 2,102 | 30.67 | |
| Conservative hold | | Swing | | |

=== Flamstead End ===
Flamstead End
| Party | Candidate | Votes | % | ±% |
|---|---|---|---|---|
| Conservative | Dee Hart* | 1,525 | 75.7 | +7.7 |
| Labour | Roy William Wareham | 490 | 24.3 | +2.7 |
| Majority | | 1,035 | 51.36 | |
| Turnout | | 2,015 | 30.03 | |
| Conservative hold | | Swing | | |

=== Goffs Oak ===
Goffs Oak
| Party | Candidate | Votes | % | ±% |
|---|---|---|---|---|
| Conservative | Pierce Alexander Connolly | 1,554 | 67.1 | +13.7 |
| Liberal Democrats | Fabio Bonfante | 431 | 18.6 | −17.1 |
| Labour | Jo Goldsmith | 332 | 14.3 | +3.4 |
| Majority | | 1,123 | 48.47 | |
| Turnout | | 2,317 | 32.04 | |
| Conservative hold | | Swing | | |

=== Hoddesdon North ===
Hoddesdon North
| Party | Candidate | Votes | % | ±% |
|---|---|---|---|---|
| Conservative | Keith Martin Brown* | 1,627 | 72.6 | +6.1 |
| Labour | Steven Keith Basing | 416 | 18.3 | +1.2 |
| Liberal Democrats | Peter Kemp | 198 | 8.8 | −7.6 |
| Majority | | 1,211 | 54.04 | |
| Turnout | | 2,241 | 30.85 | |
| Conservative hold | | Swing | | |

=== Hoddesdon Town and Rye Park ===
Hoddesdon Town and Rye Park
| Party | Candidate | Votes | % | ±% |
|---|---|---|---|---|
| Conservative | Ken Ayling* | 1,096 | 61.5 | +7.4 |
| Labour | George Robert Kenneth Williams | 473 | 26.5 | −4.3 |
| Liberal Democrats | Timothy David Peter Vizer | 214 | 12.0 | −3.1 |
| Majority | | 623 | 34.94 | |
| Turnout | | 1,783 | 25.18 | |
| Conservative hold | | Swing | | |

=== Rosedale and Bury Green ===
Rosedale and Bury Green
| Party | Candidate | Votes | % | ±% |
|---|---|---|---|---|
| Conservative | Peter Leonard Chorley | 1,252 | 65.6 | +4.7 |
| Labour | Jayne Marie Cripps | 518 | 27.1 | +3.4 |
| Liberal Democrats | Deb Highfield | 139 | 7.3 | −8.0 |
| Majority | | 734 | 38.44 | |
| Turnout | | 1,909 | 27.75 | |
| Conservative hold | | Swing | | |

=== Waltham Cross ===
Waltham Cross
| Party | Candidate | Votes | % | ±% |
|---|---|---|---|---|
| Labour | Sean Michael Waters | 1,304 | 52.3 | −2.7 |
| Conservative | Patsy Spears | 1,187 | 47.7 | +2.7 |
| Majority | | 117 | 4.70 | −5.3 |
| Turnout | | 2,491 | 31.14 | |
| Labour hold | | Swing | | |

=== Wormley and Turnford ===
Wormley and Turnford
| Party | Candidate | Votes | % | ±% |
|---|---|---|---|---|
| Conservative | Lewis Christopher Cocking* | 1,366 | 65.0 | +5.0 |
| Labour | Beverley Madeline Susan Hanshaw | 530 | 25.2 | +0.6 |
| Liberal Democrats | Lisa Ann Naylor | 205 | 9.8 | −5.6 |
| Majority | | 836 | 39.80 | |
| Turnout | | 2,101 | 26.33 | |
| Conservative hold | | Swing | | |
