= 2011 Three Rivers District Council election =

2011 UK local government election

Results of the 2011 Three Rivers District Council election

Elections to Three Rivers District Council were held on 5 May 2011 to elect one-third of the council of Three Rivers district in England. These seats had been previously defended in 2007.

The Liberal Democrats (Lib Dems) won the largest number of seats and, marginally, the most votes. The Conservatives failed to strengthen their position against the Liberal Democrats, gaining one seat from the Lib Dems but losing another to Labour. Overall, however, this council remains under firm Lib Dem control, with most seats contested between them and the Conservatives, and Labour having little prospect of improving their own representation beyond their core wards.

A senior Labour Party councillor, elected in 2007, defected to the Lib Dems shortly before this election.

After the election, the composition of the council was:

- Liberal Democrat 29 (-1)
- Conservative 14 (no change)
- Labour 4 (+1)
- English Democrats Party 1

== Election result ==
Changes relate to movement between elections and do not reflect interim defections.

Three Rivers local election result 2012
Party	Seats	Gains	Losses	Net gain/loss	Seats %	Votes %	Votes	+/−
Liberal Democrats	10	0	-1	-1	62.5	40.0	7039	
Conservative	3	+1	-1	0	18.8	39.9	7022	
Labour	3	+1	0	+1	18.8	18.3	3213	
English Democrat	0	0	0	0	0	1.3	234	
UKIP	0	0	0	0	0	0.4	69	

== Ward results ==
Defending incumbent marked with "*"

Abbots Langley
Party	Candidate	Votes	%	±%
Liberal Democrats	Matthew BEDFORD*	1006	56.6	
Conservative	Mehdi MOOSSAVI	398	22.4	
Labour	Joanne Victoria COX	259	14.6	
UKIP	David Bernard BENNETT	114	6.4	
Majority		608	34.2	
Turnout		1777	47.8	
Liberal Democrats hold		Swing		

Ashridge
Party	Candidate	Votes	%	±%
Labour	Paul Alexander GORDON	426	45.7	
Conservative	Debbie MORRIS	352	37.7	
UKIP	Andrew Jonathan SHANKS	112	12.0	
Liberal Democrats	Gabriel AITMAN	43	4.6	
Majority		74	8.0	
Turnout		933	35.1	
Labour gain from Conservative		Swing		

Bedmond and Primrose Hill
Party	Candidate	Votes	%	±%
Liberal Democrats	Helen LEHRLE	616	49.4	
Conservative	Rachel Laura ANDREWS	455	36.5	
Labour	Bruce PROCHNIK	175	14.0	
Majority		161	12.9	
Turnout		1246	40.6	
Liberal Democrats hold		Swing		

Carpenders Park
Party	Candidate	Votes	%	±%
Liberal Democrats	Pam HAMES*	916	44.8	
Conservative	Angela ROBERTS	783	38.3	
Labour	Anandana BAKSHI	192	9.4	
UKIP	Sylvia June JONES	155	7.6	
Majority		133	6.5	
Turnout		2046	51.2	
Liberal Democrats hold		Swing		

Chorleywood West
Party	Candidate	Votes	%	±%
Conservative	James MAY	1197	46.0	
Liberal Democrats	Barbara GREEN*	1170	45.0	
Labour	Fiona Katherine GOBLE	149	5.7	
Green	Tina KAMEI	85	3.3	
Majority		27	1.0	
Turnout		2601	60.3	
Conservative gain from Liberal Democrats		Swing		

Croxley Green
Party	Candidate	Votes	%	±%
Liberal Democrats	Leighton Glyn DANN*	1022	49.4	
Conservative	Nigel STEWART	620	30.0	
Labour	Maureen SEDLACEK	248	12.0	
English Democrat	Roger Warwick HOLMES	177	8.6	
Majority		402	19.4	
Turnout		2067	48.3	
Liberal Democrats hold		Swing		

Croxley Green North
Party	Candidate	Votes	%	±%
Liberal Democrats	Christopher Simon LLOYD*	732	59.7	
Conservative	Michelle BASS	274	22.3	
UKIP	Frank Martin BRAND	111	9.0	
Labour	Helen Margaret HARRIS	110	9.0	
Majority		458	37.4	
Turnout		1227	46.8	
Liberal Democrats hold		Swing		

Croxley Green South
Party	Candidate	Votes	%	±%
Liberal Democrats	Philip BRADING*	717	56.8	
Conservative	Jackie WORRALL	352	27.9	
Labour	Karen Ruth MCINTOSH	194	15.4	
Majority		365	28.9	
Turnout		1263	45.3	
Liberal Democrats hold		Swing		

Hayling
Party	Candidate	Votes	%	±%
Labour	Stephen COX	400	51.7	
Conservative	Claire HARRIS	327	42.2	
Liberal Democrats	Richard Fane LAVAL	47	6.1	
Majority		73	9.5	
Turnout		774	30.3	
Labour hold		Swing		

Langleybury
Party	Candidate	Votes	%	±%
Liberal Democrats	Paul GOGGINS*	840	54.7	
Conservative	Michelle BAUDIN	400	26.1	
Labour	Marie-Louise Straub NOLAN	295	19.2	
Majority		440	28.6	
Turnout		1535	40.5	
Liberal Democrats hold		Swing		

Leavesden
Party	Candidate	Votes	%	±%
Liberal Democrats	Stephen GILES-MEDHURST*	987	60.1	
Conservative	Hitesh Kumar TAILOR	410	25.0	
Labour	Colin James GRAY	245	14.9	
Majority		577	35.1	
Turnout		1642	40.0	
Liberal Democrats hold		Swing		

Maple Cross and Mill End
Party	Candidate	Votes	%	±%
Liberal Democrats	Ann SHAW*	883	55.0	
Conservative	David William RAW	532	33.1	
Labour	Joan KING	190	11.8	
Majority		351	21.9	
Turnout		1605	38.8	
Liberal Democrats hold		Swing		

Moor Park and Eastbury
Party	Candidate	Votes	%	±%
Conservative	Ralph SANGSTER*	1367	71.2	
Liberal Democrats	ASQUITH Jerry	282	14.7	
Labour	Greg SHUMAKE	172	9.0	
UKIP	Martin LESTER	98	5.1	
Majority		1085	56.5	
Turnout		1919	42.0	
Conservative hold		Swing		

Northwick
Party	Candidate	Votes	%	±%
Labour	Len TIPPEN	459	44.3	
Conservative	Yessica GOULD	398	38.4	
Liberal Democrats	Ron SPELLEN*	180	17.4	
Majority		61	5.9	
Turnout		1037	30.8	
Labour hold		Swing		

Oxhey Hall
Party	Candidate	Votes	%	±%
Liberal Democrats	Peter RAY*	577	45.3	
Conservative	Diane DAY	536	42.0	
Labour	Brendan O’BRIEN	162	12.7	
Majority		41	3.3	
Turnout		1275	48.8	
Liberal Democrats hold		Swing		

Sarratt
Party	Candidate	Votes	%	±%
Conservative	Tony BARTON*	707	81.5	
Liberal Democrats	Frank MAHON-DALY	96	11.1	
Labour	Mandy Susan SHUMAKE	64	7.4	
Majority		611	70.4	
Turnout		867	56.6	
Conservative hold		Swing		
