= 2016 Three Rivers District Council election =

2016 UK local government election

2016 local election results in Three Rivers

The 2016 Three Rivers District Council election took place on 5 May 2016 to elect members of Three Rivers District Council in England. This was on the same day as other local elections.

== Results summary ==
Three Rivers District Council election, 2016
Party	Seats	Gains	Losses	Net gain/loss	Seats %	Votes %	Votes	+/−
Liberal Democrats	8	0	0	Steady	53.33	38.9	10,244	+10.8
Conservative	5	0	0	Steady	33.33	35.6	9,372	-10.1
Labour	2	0	0	Steady	13.34	16.8	4,426	+1.0
UKIP	0	0	0	Steady	0.00	8.6	2,265	-1.7
TUSC	0	0	0	Steady	0.00	0.1	19	+0.0

== Ward results ==
=== Abbots Langley and Bedmond ===
Abbots Langley and Bedmond 2016
Party	Candidate	Votes	%	±%
Liberal Democrats	Matthew Bedford*	1,037	56.5	
Conservative	Leigh Fleming	394	21.5	
Labour	Ian Holmes	224	12.2	
UKIP	Lee Martin Farrell	179	9.8	
Majority		797	35.1	
Turnout		643	36.84	
Liberal Democrats hold		Swing		

=== Carpenders Park ===
Carpenders Park 2016 (2 seats)
Party	Candidate	Votes	%	±%
Conservative	David Edward Anthony Coltman	868	46.94	
Conservative	Valerie Evelyn Coltman	821	44.40	
Liberal Democrats	Pam Hames	485	26.23	
Labour	Paul Gordon	335	18.12	
UKIP	Lee Osborne	322	17.41	
Labour	Christopher Green	307	16.60	
Liberal Democrats	Dennis Rogers	294	15.90	
Majority				
Turnout		3432	35.51	
Conservative hold		Swing		
Conservative hold		Swing		

=== Chorleywood North and Sarratt ===
Chorleywood North and Sarratt 2016
Party	Candidate	Votes	%	±%
Conservative	Marilyn Butler*	1,349	72.80	
Liberal Democrats	Ashok Bhardwaj	239	12.90	
UKIP	Andrew Wells	145	7.82	
Labour	Maureen Sedlacek	120	6.48	
Majority		1110	59.90	
Turnout		1853	32.08	
Conservative hold		Swing		

=== Chorleywood South and Maple Cross ===
Chorleywood South and Maple Cross 2016
Party	Candidate	Votes	%	±%
Liberal Democrats	Ann Shaw*	1,418	59.06	
Conservative	Barbara Dickens	687	28.61	
Labour	Fiona Goble	171	7.12	
UKIP	Anne Lewis	125	5.21	
Majority		731	30.45	
Turnout		2401	42.01	
Liberal Democrats hold		Swing		

=== Dickinsons ===
Dickinsons 2016
Party	Candidate	Votes	%	±%
Liberal Democrats	Peter William Getkahn*	1,033	56.45	
Conservative	Jussie Kaur	511	27.92	
Labour	David Wynne-Jones	286	16.63	
Majority		522	28.53	
Turnout		1830	35.95	
Liberal Democrats hold		Swing		

=== Durrants ===
Durrants 2016
Party	Candidate	Votes	%	±%
Liberal Democrats	Chris Lloyd*	1,412	73.24	
Conservative	Brian Sainsbury	334	17.32	
Labour	Sarah Linhart	182	9.44	
Majority		1078	55.92	
Turnout		1928	38.77	
Liberal Democrats hold		Swing		

=== Gade Valley ===
Gade Valley 2016
Party	Candidate	Votes	%	±%
Liberal Democrats	Joy Mann*	971	61.69	
Conservative	Dee Ward	399	25.35	
Labour	Bruce Prochnik	204	12.96	
Majority		572	38.34	
Turnout		1574	32.02	
Liberal Democrats hold		Swing		

=== Leavesden ===
Leavesden 2016
Party	Candidate	Votes	%	±%
Liberal Democrats	Stephen Giles-Medhurst*	885	54.19	
Conservative	Hitesh Tailor	309	18.92	
Labour	Joanne Victoria Cox	233	14.27	
UKIP	David Bennett	187	11.45	
TUSC	Richard Shattock	19	1.17	
Majority		576	35.27	
Turnout		1633	30.93	
Liberal Democrats hold		Swing		

=== Moor Park and Eastbury ===
Moor Park and Eastbury 2016
Party	Candidate	Votes	%	±%
Conservative	Debbie Morris*	1,186	75.93	
Liberal Democrats	Jeremy Edmund Campion Asquith	168	10.76	
Labour	Pamela King	141	9.03	
UKIP	Cameron Finch	67	4.28	
Majority		1018	65.17	
Turnout		1562	34.67	
Conservative hold		Swing		

=== Oxhey Hall and Hayling ===
Oxhey Hall and Hayling 2016
Party	Candidate	Votes	%	±%
Liberal Democrats	Andrew Scarth*	926	47.76	
Conservative	John Kyles	496	25.58	
Labour	Brendan O’Brien	339	17.48	
UKIP	James Stacey	178	9.18	
Majority		430	22.18	
Turnout		1939	38.14	
Liberal Democrats hold		Swing		

=== Penn and Mill End ===
Penn and Mill End 2016
Party	Candidate	Votes	%	±%
Liberal Democrats	Roger Seabourne*	770	45.85	
Conservative	David Raw	527	31.39	
UKIP	Sarah Green	214	12.75	
Labour	James McEwan	168	10.01	
Majority		243	25.54	
Turnout		1679	32.93	
Liberal Democrats hold		Swing		

=== Rickmansworth Town ===
Rickmansworth Town 2016
Party	Candidate	Votes	%	±%
Conservative	David Sansom*	1,031	52.82	
Liberal Democrats	Pat Howell	489	25.05	
Labour	Graham Dale	286	14.65	
UKIP	Francis Johnson	146	7.48	
Majority		542	27.77	
Turnout		1952	35.38	
Conservative hold		Swing		

=== South Oxhey ===
South Oxhey 2016 (2 seats)
Party	Candidate	Votes	%	±%
Labour	Joan King	749	53.35	
Labour	Stephen Michael James King	681	48.50	
UKIP	Yessica Gould	354	25.21	
UKIP	Michael Ernest Matthewson	348	24.79	
Conservative	Shanti Maru	240	17.09	
Conservative	Elizabeth Willetts	220	15.67	
Liberal Democrats	Jill Marguerite Swainson	66	4.70	
Liberal Democrats	Ben Trevett	51	3.63	
Majority				
Turnout		2709	28.48	
Labour hold		Swing		
Labour hold		Swing		
