= 2008 Three Rivers District Council election =

2008 UK local government election

Results of the 2008 Three Rivers District Council election

Elections to Three Rivers District Council were held on 1 May 2008. One-third of the council was up for election. The Liberal Democrats won the most seats, despite the Conservatives winning more votes. The Conservatives also gained a seat, strengthening their position against the Liberal Democrats, who remained stayed in overall control of Three Rivers.

The election was marked by the collapse of Labour support in South Oxhey, where Labour had been at their strongest. They lost one seat, Ashridge, to the far-right British National Party (BNP). Another seat, Northwick, was lost to the Conservatives. Labour's group leader, Kerron Cross, only narrowly retained his seat, with the BNP candidate coming second by 14 votes in a tight three-horse race.

After the election, the composition of the council was

- Liberal Democrat 31 (0)
- Conservative 12 (+1)
- Labour 4 (-2)
- British National Party 1 (+1)

== Election result ==
Three Rivers local election result 2008
Party	Seats	Gains	Losses	Net gain/loss	Seats %	Votes %	Votes	+/−
Liberal Democrats	9	0	0	0	52.9	43.6	9,292	-11.3%
Conservative	5	1	0	+1	29.4	47.1	10,035	+11.4%
Labour	1	0	2	-2	5.9	5.9	1,266	-1.8%
BNP	1	1	0	+1	5.9	2.4	502	+2.4%
English Democrat	0	0	0	0	0	0.7	152	+0.7%
UKIP	0	0	0	0	0	0.3	74	-0.4%

== Ward results ==
Abbots Langley
Party	Candidate	Votes	%	±%
Liberal Democrats	David Major	904	65.0	+4.8
Conservative	Andy Woodard	387	27.8	+1.1
Labour	Jeannie Mehta	99	7.1	−5.9
Majority		517	2.7	+3.7
Turnout		1,390	37.6	−3.8
Liberal Democrats hold		Swing	+1.9	

Ashridge
Party	Candidate	Votes	%	±%
BNP	Padraic Dunning	282	33.8	+33.8
Conservative	Yessica Gould	264	31.7	−1.8
Labour	Nena Spellen	244	29.3	−10.3
UKIP	Andrew Shanks	44	5.3	+5.3
Majority		18	2.1	N/A
Turnout		834	32.0	+3.2
BNP gain from Labour		Swing	+22.0	

Carpenders Park
Party	Candidate	Votes	%	±%
Liberal Democrats	Geoff Dunne	985	56.4	−2.9
Conservative	Craig Lewell	663	38.0	+4.5
Labour	Brendan O'Brien	99	5.7	−1.6
Majority		322	18.4	−7.4
Turnout		1747	44.0	−7.3
Liberal Democrats hold		Swing	-3.7	

Chorleywood East
Party	Candidate	Votes	%	±%
Conservative	Richard Booth	1,015	81.7	+7.4
Liberal Democrats	Barbara Green	288	18.3	−7.4
Majority		787	63.3	+14.7
Turnout		1,243	37.9	−8.2
Conservative hold		Swing	+7.4	

Chorleywood West
Party	Candidate	Votes	%	±%
Liberal Democrats	Harry Davies	1,238	52.5	+3.0
Conservative	Bob Arthy	1,059	44.9	+0.2
Labour	Karen McIntosh	62	2.6	−3.2
Majority		179	7.6	+2.8
Turnout		2,359	55.7	−5.6
Liberal Democrats hold		Swing	+1.4	

Croxley Green
Party	Candidate	Votes	%	±%
Liberal Democrats	Brian Norman	833	51.0	−3.4
Conservative	Mark Englefield	647	39.6	+5.4
English Democrat	Roger Holmes	152	9.3	+9.3
Majority		186	11.4	−8.9
Turnout		1,632	38.4	−6.6
Liberal Democrats hold		Swing	-4.4	

Hayling
Party	Candidate	Votes	%	±%
Labour	Kerron Cross	234	32.3	−25.2
BNP	Deidre Gates	220	30.3	+30.3
Conservative	Jacqueline Worrall	186	25.7	+2.7
Liberal Democrats	David Lowes	55	7.6	−11.9
UKIP	Richard Evans	30	4.1	+4.1
Majority		14	1.9	−27.9
Turnout		725	28.6	−2.0
Labour hold		Swing	-13.9	

Langleybury
Party	Candidate	Votes	%	±%
Liberal Democrats	Chris Whateley-Smith	802	68.1	+5.6
Conservative	Margaret Lambert	256	21.8	−0.6
Labour	Stephen Cox	119	10.1	−5.0
Majority		545	46.3	+6.1
Turnout		1,178	32.8	−5.7
Liberal Democrats hold		Swing	+3.1	

Leavesden
Party	Candidate	Votes	%	±%
Liberal Democrats	Sue Bartrick	807	72.0	+12.7
Conservative	Christopher Hawes	242	21.6	−8.5
Labour	Colin Gray	72	6.4	−4.3
Majority		565	50.4	+21.2
Turnout		1,121	27.9	−6.1
Liberal Democrats hold		Swing	+10.6	

Maple Cross and Mill End
Party	Candidate	Votes	%	±%
Liberal Democrats	Peter Wakeling	774	62.4	−2.3
Conservative	James McGowan	466	37.6	+2.3
Majority		308	24.8	−4.6
Turnout		1,240	30.9	−6.4
Liberal Democrats hold		Swing	-2.3	

Moor Park and Eastbury
Party	Candidate	Votes	%	±%
Conservative	Amrit Mediratta	1,206	76.6	+2.0
Liberal Democrats	Gabriel Aitman	368	23.4	−2.0
Majority		838	53.2	+4.0
Turnout		1,574	35.7	−7.7
Conservative hold		Swing	+2.0	

Northwick
Party	Candidate	Votes	%	±%
Conservative	Alistair Macdonald	284	33.7	+3.7
Labour	Ron Spellen	282	33.5	−9.9
Liberal Democrats	Alan Feldman	276	32.8	+6.3
Majority		2	0.2	N/A
Turnout		842	23.6	−3.9
Conservative gain from Labour		Swing	+6.8	

Oxhey Hall
Party	Candidate	Votes	%	±%
Liberal Democrats	Alison Scarth	593	60.8	+14.5
Conservative	David Williams	328	33.6	−9.5
Labour	Leslie Beckett	55	5.6	−5.0
Majority		265	27.2	+23.9
Turnout		976	38.1	−3.5
Liberal Democrats hold		Swing	+12.0	

Penn
Party	Candidate	Votes	%	±%
Liberal Democrats	Sarah Nelmes	441	58.7	
Conservative	Maximin Green	310	41.3	
Majority		131	17.4	
Turnout		751	29.9	
Liberal Democrats hold		Swing		

Rickmansworth (2)
Party	Candidate	Votes	%	±%
Conservative	Paula Hiscocks	957		
Conservative	David Sansom	879		
Liberal Democrats	Anthony Humphreys	310		
Liberal Democrats	Jill Swainson	292		
Turnout		2,438	36.3	
Conservative hold		Swing		
Conservative hold		Swing		

Rickmansworth West
Party	Candidate	Votes	%	±%
Conservative	Russell Smith	885	69.6	+9.7
Liberal Democrats	Patricia Howell	386	30.4	−5.2
Majority		499	39.3	+14.9
Turnout		1,271	45.8	−5.6
Conservative hold		Swing	+7.5	
