= Bedmond and Primrose Hill =

Coordinates: 51.719°N 0.426°W

Bedmond and Primrose Hill is a ward in Three Rivers, in England, the United Kingdom. It is located in south-west Hertfordshire, in the East of England region. The ward includes Bedmond and a sparsely populated area to the north. It lies north of the M25 motorway, which separates the ward from Abbots Langley, and is bordered by Kings Langley to the west, and Hemel Hempstead to the north. Slightly to the east of the ward is the M1 motorway.

Bedmond elects two members to Three Rivers District Council. For elections to Hertfordshire County Council, Bedmond and Primrose Hill is part of the Abbots Langley division. For elections to the House of Commons, the ward is in the St Albans constituency.
