= Stevenage Borough Council elections =

Local government elections in Hertfordshire, England

One third of Stevenage Borough Council in Hertfordshire, England is elected each year, followed by one year when there is an election to Hertfordshire County Council instead.

== Council elections ==
Composition of the council
Year	Conservative	Labour	Liberal Democrats (Note: Includes totals for the predecessors of the Liberal Democrats, the Liberal Party and SDP (both of which participated in the Alliance).)	Reform	Independents & Others	Council control after election
Local government reorganisation; council established (34 seats)
1973	3	31	0	-	0	Labour
1976	6	28	0	-	0	Labour
New ward boundaries (39 seats)
1979	4	35	0	-	0	Labour
1980	3	36	0	-	0	Labour
1982	2	29	8	-	0	Labour
1983	2	27	10	-	0	Labour
1984	2	26	11	-	0	Labour
1986	1	29	9	-	0	Labour
1987	1	26	12	-	0	Labour
1988	1	27	10	-	1	Labour
1990	1	32	6	-	0	Labour
1991	1	35	3	-	0	Labour
1992	4	32	3	-	0	Labour
1994	4	32	3	-	0	Labour
1995	2	36	1	-	0	Labour
1996	0	38	1	-	0	Labour
1998	0	37	2	-	0	Labour
New ward boundaries (39 seats)
1999	3	33	3	-	0	Labour
2000	3	33	3	-	0	Labour
2002	3	33	3	-	0	Labour
2003	3	33	3	-	0	Labour
2004	3	32	4	-	0	Labour
2006	3	32	4	-	0	Labour
2007	3	32	4	-	0	Labour
2008	5	30	3	-	1	Labour
2010	9	27	3	-	0	Labour
2011	9	27	3	-	0	Labour
2012	6	30	3	-	0	Labour
2014	2	34	3	-	0	Labour
2015	6	30	3	-	0	Labour
2016	7	29	3	-	0	Labour
2018	9	26	4	-	0	Labour
2019	7	27	5	-	0	Labour
2021	11	22	6	0	0	Labour
2022	9	24	6	0	0	Labour
2023	9	24	6	0	0	Labour
New ward boundaries (39 seats)
2024	1	32	6	0	0	Labour
2026	1	22	6	10	0	Labour

== Borough result maps ==
1979 results map

1980 results map

1982 results map

1983 results map

1984 results map

1986 results map

1987 results map

1988 results map

1990 results map

1991 results map

1992 results map

1994 results map

1995 results map

1996 results map

1998 results map

1999 results map

2000 results map

2002 results map

2003 results map

2004 results map

2006 results map

2007 results map

2008 results map

2010 results map

2011 results map

2012 results map

2014 results map

2015 results map

2016 results map

2018 results map

2019 results map

2021 results map

2022 results map

2023 results map

2024 results map

2026 results map

== By-election results ==
=== 1994–1998 ===
Pin Green by-election: 1 May 1997
Party	Candidate	Votes	%	±%
Labour		1,519	59.2	−14.8
Conservative		596	23.2	+8.1
Liberal Democrats		367	14.3	+3.5
Independent		86	3.3	+3.3
Majority		923	36.0	
Turnout		2,568		
Labour hold		Swing		

Symonds Green by-election: 1 May 1997
Party	Candidate	Votes	%	±%
Labour		2,260	53.0	−18.8
Conservative		1,398	32.8	+4.6
Liberal Democrats		603	14.1	+14.1
Majority		862	20.2	
Turnout		4,261		
Labour hold		Swing		

=== 1998–2002 ===
Roebuck by-election: 16 July 1998
Party	Candidate	Votes	%	±%
Labour		520	49.6	−16.6
Liberal Democrats		309	29.5	+16.3
Conservative		220	21.0	+0.3
Majority		211	20.1	
Turnout		1,049	26.1	
Labour hold		Swing		

Bandley Hill by-election: 23 September 1999
Party	Candidate	Votes	%	±%
Labour		495	73.9	+14.2
Conservative		106	15.8	−2.2
Liberal Democrats		69	10.3	−7.4
Majority		389	58.1	
Turnout		670	13.5	
Labour hold		Swing		

=== 2002–2006 ===
Roebuck by-election: 9 December 2004
Party	Candidate	Votes	%	±%
Labour	Sherma Batson	600	52.6	+8.1
Conservative		292	25.6	−4.0
Liberal Democrats	Gordon Knight	249	21.8	−4.0
Majority		308	27.0	
Turnout		1,141	25.9	
Labour hold		Swing		

=== 2006–2010 ===
Pin Green by-election: 27 March 2008
Party	Candidate	Votes	%	±%
Labour	Lin Martin-Haugh	671	54.8	+3.2
Conservative	Leslie Clark	302	24.7	+1.7
Liberal Democrats	Mary Griffith	149	12.2	−0.3
UKIP	Rick Seddon	61	5.0	+5.0
Green	Tom Moore	41	3.3	+3.3
Majority		368	30.1	
Turnout		1,225	29.0	
Labour hold		Swing		

Pin Green by-election: 25 September 2008
Party	Candidate	Votes	%	±%
Labour	Bruce Jackson	716	54.4	+6.9
Conservative	Ralph Dimelow	321	24.4	−5.1
Liberal Democrats	Gordon Knight	112	8.5	−2.8
UKIP	Terence Tompkins	85	6.5	+6.5
Free England Party	Richard Atkins	81	6.2	−5.4
Majority		395	30.0	
Turnout		1,315		
Labour hold		Swing		

=== 2014–2018 ===
Roebuck by-election: 4 May 2017
Party	Candidate	Votes	%	±%
Conservative	Alexander Farquharson	725	44.1	+15.5
Labour	Monika Cherney-Craw	714	43.4	+0.0
Liberal Democrats	Thomas Wren	94	5.7	+1.0
Green	Martin Malocco	87	5.3	+0.1
TUSC	Helen Kerr	25	1.5	+0.5
Majority		11	0.7	
Turnout		1,645		
Conservative gain from Labour		Swing		

=== 2022–2026 ===
Bedwell by-election: 19 January 2023
Party	Candidate	Votes	%	±%
Labour	Conor McGrath	907	69.8	+13.0
Conservative	Matthew Wyatt	263	20.2	−7.1
Liberal Democrats	Chris Berry	129	9.9	−1.6
Majority		644	49.6	
Turnout		1,299		
Labour hold		Swing		

Manor by-election: 13 February 2025
Party	Candidate	Votes	%	±%
Liberal Democrats	Peter Wilkins	760	55.6	
Reform	Matthew Hurst	320	23.4	
Conservative	Marcel Houps	139	10.2	
Labour	Thea Pendlebury	101	7.4	
Green	Stephani Mok	46	3.4	
Majority		440	49.6	
Turnout		1,366		
Liberal Democrats hold		Swing		

Bedwell by-election: 26 June 2025
Party	Candidate	Votes	%	±%
Labour	Dermot Kehoe	506	43.2	
Reform	John Duncan	404	34.5	
Conservative	Marcel Houps	105	9.0	
Green	Stephani Mok	79	6.7	
Liberal Democrats	Jill Brinkworth	78	6.7	
Majority		102	8.7	
Turnout		1,172		
Labour hold		Swing		

Roebuck by-election: 30 October 2025
Party	Candidate	Votes	%	±%
Reform	Rob Henry	513	39.2	
Labour	Thea Pendlebury	353	26.9	
Conservative	Pawel Gora	157	12.0	
Liberal Democrats	Nigel Bye	148	11.3	
Green	Glen Rozemont	139	10.6	
Majority		160	12.2	
Turnout		1,310		
Reform gain from Labour		Swing		
