= 1996 Stevenage Borough Council election =

1996 UK local government election

← 1995	2 May 1996	1998 →

13 of the 39 seats to Stevenage Borough Council 20 seats needed for a majority
	First party	Second party
Party	Labour	Liberal Democrats
Seats before	36	1
Seats won	12	1
Seats after	38	1
Seat change	▲2	Steady
Popular vote	12,748	2,246
Percentage	68.3%	12.0%
- Map showing the results of contested wards in the 1996 Stevenage Borough Council elections.
Council control before election
Labour
Council control after election
Labour

Elections to Stevenage Council were held on 2 May 1996. One third of the council was up for election; the seats which were last contested in 1992. The Labour party stayed in overall control of the council. The council was one of a number where the Conservatives lost their last seats.

After the election, the composition of the council was

- Labour 38
- Liberal Democrats 1

== Election result ==
Stevenage local election result 1996
Party	Seats	Gains	Losses	Net gain/loss	Seats %	Votes %	Votes	+/−
Labour	12	3	1	▲2	92.3	70.3	12,748	▲27.0
Conservative	0	0	3	▼2	0	18.6	3,468	▼17.9
Militant Labour	0	0	0	0	0	1.1	196	New
Social Democrat	0	0	0	▼1	0	0	0	

All comparisons in seats and vote share are to the corresponding 1992 election.

== Ward results ==
=== Bandley Hill ===
Location of Bandley Hill

Bandley Hill
Party	Candidate	Votes	%
Labour	Bob Woodward	1,175	68.2%
Liberal Democrats	K. Lloyd	220	12.8%
Conservative	F. Warner	187	10.9%
Militant Labour	J. Horton	141	8.2%
Turnout			29.2%
Labour hold			

=== Bedwell Plash ===
Location of Bedwell Plash ward

Bedwell Plash
Party	Candidate	Votes	%
Labour	Michael Downing	1,086	79.9%
Conservative	M. Wyatt	170	12.5%
Liberal Democrats	S. Grubert	104	7.6%
Turnout			36.8%
Labour hold			

=== Chells ===
Location of Chells ward

Chells
Party	Candidate	Votes	%
Labour	Ken Vale	879	84.8%
Conservative	G. Hegan	158	15.2%
Turnout			32.1%
Labour hold			

=== Longmeadow ===
Location of Longmeadow ward

Longmeadow
Party	Candidate	Votes	%
Labour	Bruce Jackson	1,026	64.2%
Conservative	R. Dimelow	295	18.4%
Liberal Democrats	M. Latham	278	17.4%
Turnout			33.2%
Labour hold			

=== Martins Wood ===
Location of Martins Wood ward

Martins Wood
Party	Candidate	Votes	%
Labour	Michael P. Patston	1,269	64.6%
Conservative	E. Hegan	437	22.2%
Liberal Democrats	B. Segadelli	259	13.2%
Turnout			28.6%
Labour gain from Conservative			

=== Mobbsbury ===
Location of Mobbsbury ward

Mobbsbury
Party	Candidate	Votes	%
Liberal Democrats	Robin G. Parker	847	50.4%
Labour	J. Nadauld	755	45.0%
Conservative	S. Huetson	77	4.6%
Turnout			54.2%
Liberal Democrats hold			

Note: Mobbsbury ward was won by Labour at the last regular election in 1992, but gained by the Liberal Democrats in an unscheduled election in 1994.

=== Monkswood ===
Location of Monkswood ward

Monkswood
Party	Candidate	Votes	%
Labour	Liz Harrington	653	85.6%
Conservative	P. Rushforth	110	14.4%
Turnout			34.0%
Labour hold			

=== Old Stevenage ===
Location of Old Stevenage ward

Old Stevenage
Party	Candidate	Votes	%
Labour	Pamela E.J. Gallagher	1,261	60.7%
Conservative	P. McPartland	815	39.3%
Turnout			37.7%
Labour gain from Conservative			

=== Pin Green ===
Location of Pin Green ward

Pin Green
Party	Candidate	Votes	%
Labour	Simon K. Speller	910	74.0%
Conservative	M. Mason	186	15.1%
Liberal Democrats	J. Moorcroft	133	10.8%
Turnout			34.7%
Labour hold			

=== Roebuck ===
Location of Roebuck ward

Roebuck
Party	Candidate	Votes	%
Labour	Monika Cherney-Craw	871	69.4%
Conservative	M. Hurst	207	16.5%
Liberal Democrats	J. Hamblin	177	14.1%
Turnout			31.9%
Labour hold			

=== St Nicholas ===
Location of St Nicholas ward

St Nicholas
Party	Candidate	Votes	%
Labour	Bob Fowler	687	68.1%
Liberal Democrats	M. Griffith	166	16.5%
Conservative	S. Woods	156	15.5%
Turnout			29.1%
Labour hold			

=== Shephall ===
Location of Shephall ward

Shephall
Party	Candidate	Votes	%
Labour	Robert A. Clark	697	77.2%
Conservative	M. Davies	89	9.9%
Liberal Democrats	G. Snell	62	6.9%
Militant Labour	M. Pickersgrill	55	6.1%
Turnout			28.7%
Labour hold			

=== Symonds Green ===
Location of Symonds Green ward

Symonds Green
Party	Candidate	Votes	%
Labour	Tony T. Turner	1,479	71.8%
Conservative	M. Notley	581	28.2%
Turnout			37.3%
Labour gain from Conservative			
