= 1998 Stevenage Borough Council election =

1998 UK local government election

← 1996	7 May 1998	1999 →

13 of the 39 seats to Stevenage Borough Council 20 seats needed for a majority
- Turnout: 26.0%
	First party	Second party
Party	Labour	Liberal Democrats
Seats before	38	1
Seats won	12	1
Seats after	37	2
Seat change	▼1	▲1
Popular vote	9,144	2,305
Percentage	62.5%	15.8%
- Map showing the results of contested wards in the 1998 Stevenage Borough Council elections.
Council control before election
Labour
Council control after election
Labour

Elections to Stevenage Council were held on 7 May 1998. One third of the council was up for election; the seats which were last contested in 1994. The Labour Party stayed in overall control of the council.

After the election, the composition of the council was:

- Labour 37
- Liberal Democrat 2

== Election result ==
Stevenage local election result 1998
Party	Seats	Gains	Losses	Net gain/loss	Seats %	Votes %	Votes	+/−
Labour	12	0	1	▼1	92.3	62.5	9,144	▲2.8
Liberal Democrats	1	1	0	▲1	7.7	15.8	2,305	▼2.3
Conservative	0	0	0	0	0	21.5	3,144	▲0.9
Socialist Alternative	0	0	0	0	0	0.2	35	New

All comparisons in seats and vote share are to the corresponding 1994 election.

== Ward results ==
=== Bandley Hill ===
Location of Bandley Hill ward

Bandley Hill
Party	Candidate	Votes	%
Labour	Jacqueline Hollywell	925	71.0%
Conservative	Freda Warner	206	15.8%
Liberal Democrats	Gordon Knigh	136	10.4%
Socialist Alternative	Mark Pickersgill	35	2.7%
Turnout			20.8%
Labour hold			

=== Bedwell Plash ===
Location of Bedwell Plash ward

Bedwell Plash
Party	Candidate	Votes	%
Labour	William Lawrence	729	73.9%
Conservative	Victoria Greaves	147	14.9%
Liberal Democrats	Peter Wilkins	110	11.2%
Turnout			26.3%
Labour hold			

=== Chells ===
Location of Chells ward

Chells
Party	Candidate	Votes	%
Labour	Pamela Stuart	508	70.1%
Liberal Democrats	Leonard Lambert	125	17.2%
Conservative	Gwen Hegan	92	12.7%
Turnout			21.9%
Labour hold			

=== Longmeadow ===
Location of Longmeadow ward

Longmeadow
Party	Candidate	Votes	%
Labour	Ann Webb	767	61.3%
Conservative	Matthew Hurst	272	21.7%
Liberal Democrats	Margaret Latham	212	16.9%
Turnout			25.4%
Labour hold			

=== Martins Wood ===
Location of Martins Wood ward

Martins Wood
Party	Candidate	Votes	%
Labour	Gary Marshall	853	47.6%
Conservative	Stuart Greaves	706	39.4%
Liberal Democrats	Elisabeth Knight	234	13.1%
Turnout			22.7%
Labour hold			

=== Mobbsbury ===
Location of Mobbsbury ward

Mobbsbury
Party	Candidate	Votes	%
Liberal Democrats	Graham Snell	617	47.7%
Labour	Gillian Tuffin	614	47.4%
Conservative	Matthew Wyatt	63	4.9%
Turnout			41.7%
Liberal Democrats gain from Labour			

=== Monkswood ===
Location of Monkswood ward

Monkswood
Party	Candidate	Votes	%
Labour	David Cullen	463	77.0%
Liberal Democrats	George Robbins	70	11.6%
Conservative	Alexandra Young	68	11.3%
Turnout			27.1%
Labour hold			

=== Old Stevenage ===
Location of Old Stevenage ward

Old Stevenage
Party	Candidate	Votes	%
Labour	Hugh Tessier	944	53.5%
Conservative	Jean Carter	615	34.9%
Liberal Democrats	David Williams	205	11.6%
Turnout			30.5%
Labour hold			

=== Pin Green ===
Location of Pin Green ward

Pin Green
Party	Candidate	Votes	%
Labour	Reginald Smith	616	72.0%
Conservative	Marion Mason	145	16.9%
Liberal Democrats	Victoria Kelleher	95	11.1%
Turnout			24.2%
Labour hold			

=== Roebuck ===
Location of Roebuck ward

Roebuck
Party	Candidate	Votes	%
Labour	Brian Dunnell	654	66.2%
Conservative	Claire Halling	204	20.6%
Liberal Democrats	Cecil Lewis	130	13.2%
Turnout			24.5%
Labour hold			

=== St Nicholas ===
Location of St Nicholas ward

St Nicholas
Party	Candidate	Votes	%
Labour	Stanley Munden	439	53.6%
Conservative	Sheila Woods	201	24.5%
Liberal Democrats	Mary Griffith	179	21.9%
Turnout			23.2%
Labour hold			

=== Shephall ===
Location of Shephall ward

Shephall
Party	Candidate	Votes	%
Labour	Eddie Webb	583	82.8%
Conservative	Sheree Huetson	69	9.8%
Liberal Democrats	Heather Snell	52	7.4%
Turnout			22.5%
Labour hold			

=== Symonds Green ===
Location of Symonds Green ward

Symonds Green
Party	Candidate	Votes	%
Labour	David Kissane	1,049	67.9%
Conservative	Peter McPartland	356	23.0%
Liberal Democrats	Sydney Grubert	140	9.1%
Turnout			26.6%
Labour hold			
