= 2023 Stevenage Borough Council election =

2023 English local election

← 2022	4 May 2023	2024 →

13 out of 39 seats to Stevenage Borough Council 20 seats needed for a majority

	First party	Second party	Third party
Leader	Richard Henry	Phil Bibby	Robin Parker
Party	Labour	Conservative	Liberal Democrats
Leader's seat	St Nicholas	Woodfield	Manor
Last election	24 seats, 44.7%	9 seats, 31.2%	6 seats, 18.3%
Seats before	24	9	6
Seats won	9	2	2
Seats after	24	9	6
Seat change	Steady	Steady	Steady
Popular vote	8,743	5,701	3,871
Percentage	44.1%	28.8%	19.5%
Swing	▼0.6%	▼2.4%	▲1.2%
- Winner of each seat at the 2023 Stevenage Borough Council election
Leader before election
Richard Henry
Labour Co-op
Leader after election
Richard Henry
Labour Co-op

The 2023 Stevenage Borough Council election took place on 4 May 2023 to elect members of Stevenage Borough Council in Stevenage, Hertfordshire, England. This was on the same day as other local elections across England. Thirteen of the 39 seats on the council were up for election. Labour retained its majority on the council.

== Overview ==
Stevenage Borough Council has had a Labour majority since it was created in 1974. No seats changed party at this election and so Labour retained its majority.

== Overall results ==
The overall results were:

2023 Stevenage Borough Council election
Party	This election			Full council			This election		
Party	Seats	Net	Seats %	Other	Total	Total %	Votes	Votes %	+/−
Labour Co-op	9	Steady	69.2	15	24	61.5	8,743	44.1	-0.6
Conservative	2	Steady	15.4	7	9	23.1	5,701	28.8	-2.4
Liberal Democrats	2	Steady	15.4	4	6	15.4	3,871	19.5	+1.2
Green	0	Steady	0.0	0	0	0.0	1,007	5.1	+2.2
TUSC	0	Steady	0.0	0	0	0.0	367	1.8	-0.1
Independent	0	Steady	0.0	0	0	0.0	70	0.4	-0.4
Reform UK	0	Steady	0.0	0	0	0.0	59	0.3	+0.1

== Ward results ==
The Statement of Persons Nominated, which details the candidates standing in each ward, was released by Stevenage Borough Council following the close of nominations on 4 April 2023. The results for each ward were as follows, with an asterisk (*) indicating a sitting councillor standing for re-election:

=== Bandley Hill ===
Bandley Hill
Party	Candidate	Votes	%	±%
Labour Co-op	Mason Humberstone	647	44.0	−3.7
Conservative	David Stubbs	543	36.9	+1.2
Liberal Democrats	Andrew Anderson	173	11.8	−2.3
Green	Adrian Busolini	86	5.9	N/A
TUSC	Mark Pickersgill	21	1.4	−1.1
Majority		104		
Turnout			29.10	
Registered electors		5,082		
Labour hold		Swing		

=== Bedwell ===
Bedwell
Party	Candidate	Votes	%	±%
Labour Co-op	Ellie Plater	771	53.9	−2.9
Conservative	Cathy Bibby	305	21.3	−6.0
Liberal Democrats	Chris Berry	160	11.2	−0.3
Green	Steven Hodges	104	7.3	N/A
Independent	David Bundy	70	4.9	N/A
TUSC	Steve Glennon	21	1.5	−2.9
Majority		466		
Turnout			24.64	
Registered electors		5,836		
Labour hold		Swing		

=== Chells ===
Chells
Party	Candidate	Votes	%	±%
Liberal Democrats	Stephen Booth*	691	45.7	±0.0
Labour Co-op	Teresa Callaghan*	477	31.6	+0.6
Conservative	Matthew Wyatt	298	19.7	−0.5
TUSC	Roger Charles	45	3.0	−0.1
Majority		214		
Turnout			30.31	
Registered electors		5,008		
Liberal Democrats hold		Swing		

The Labour candidate Teresa Callaghan had represented Martins Wood ward prior to this election.

=== Longmeadow ===
Longmeadow
Party	Candidate	Votes	%	±%
Conservative	Alex Farquharson*	637	43.6	+3.7
Labour Co-op	Alistair Gordon	623	42.7	+3.8
Liberal Democrats	Matthew Snell	155	10.6	+2.7
TUSC	Helen Kerr	45	3.1	+1.5
Majority		14		
Turnout			33.12	
Registered electors		4,432		
Conservative hold		Swing		

=== Manor ===
Manor
Party	Candidate	Votes	%	±%
Liberal Democrats	Robin Parker*	1,254	71.8	+8.8
Labour Co-op	Louisa Barr	297	17.0	+0.7
Conservative	Robert Lingard	195	11.2	−4.6
Majority		957		
Turnout			34.60	
Registered electors		5,060		
Liberal Democrats hold		Swing		

=== Martins Wood ===
Martins Wood
Party	Candidate	Votes	%	±%
Labour Co-op	Carolina Veres	665	48.5	+4.9
Conservative	Jack Ingarfil	339	24.7	−0.4
Liberal Democrats	Madani Mannan	202	14.7	−9.8
Green	Paul Dawson	133	9.7	+2.8
TUSC	Mark Gentleman	32	2.3	N/A
Majority		326		
Turnout			29.93	
Registered electors		4,631		
Labour hold		Swing		

=== Old Town ===
Old Town
Party	Candidate	Votes	%	±%
Labour Co-op	Loraine Rossati*	992	45.0	−1.8
Conservative	Jody Hanafin	792	36.0	−3.8
Green	Jim Borcherds	236	10.7	+2.7
Liberal Democrats	Charles Littleton	151	6.9	+2.2
TUSC	Mark Kerr	32	1.5	+0.8
Majority		200		
Turnout			35.18	
Registered electors		6,282		
Labour hold		Swing		

=== Pin Green ===
Pin Green
Party	Candidate	Votes	%	±%
Labour Co-op	Jeannette Thomas*	725	52.8	+3.8
Conservative	Andy Facey	361	26.3	−5.3
Green	Naomi Lovelace-Collins	149	10.9	+2.3
Liberal Democrats	Isabel Wilks	137	10.0	+0.7
Majority		364		
Turnout			28.32	
Registered electors		4,855		
Labour hold		Swing		

=== Roebuck ===
Roebuck
Party	Candidate	Votes	%	±%
Labour Co-op	Forhad Chowdhury	682	47.0	−0.1
Conservative	Nick Leech	502	34.6	−4.5
Liberal Democrats	Nigel Bye	170	11.7	+0.3
Green	Stephani Mok	75	5.2	N/A
TUSC	Bryan Clare	23	1.6	−0.8
Majority		180		
Turnout			28.57	
Registered electors		5,120		
Labour hold		Swing		

=== St Nicholas ===
St Nicholas
Party	Candidate	Votes	%	±%
Labour Co-op	Claire Parris*	943	58.3	−1.5
Conservative	Mel Mitchell	415	25.7	−1.2
Liberal Democrats	Hazel Jones	190	11.8	+1.8
TUSC	Amber Gentleman	69	4.3	+1.0
Majority		528		
Turnout			28.41	
Registered electors		5,717		
Labour hold		Swing		

=== Shephall ===
Shephall
Party	Candidate	Votes	%	±%
Labour Co-op	Sarah Mead*	736	59.3	−0.4
Conservative	Celia Lawrence	306	24.7	−2.2
Liberal Democrats	David Barks	151	12.2	+2.6
TUSC	Barbara Clare	48	3.9	+0.1
Majority		430		
Turnout			27.16	
Registered electors		4,609		
Labour hold		Swing		

=== Symonds Green ===
Symonds Green
Party	Candidate	Votes	%	±%
Labour Co-op	Michael Downing*	720	48.9	−4.8
Conservative	Dhiren Malavia	435	29.6	−1.5
Liberal Democrats	Clive Hearmon	155	10.5	+3.7
Green	Richard Warr	130	8.8	+2.1
TUSC	Trevor Palmer	31	2.1	+0.4
Majority		285		
Turnout			33.21	
Registered electors		4,447		
Labour hold		Swing		

=== Woodfield ===
Woodfield
Party	Candidate	Votes	%	±%
Conservative	Graham Lawrence*	573	38.9	−8.1
Labour Co-op	Jim Callaghan	465	31.6	−2.4
Liberal Democrats	Neil Brinkworth	282	19.1	+3.6
Green	Elizabeth Sturges	94	6.4	N/A
Reform UK	Amodio Amato	59	4.0	+0.5
Majority		108		
Turnout			35.16	
Registered electors		4,204		
Conservative hold		Swing		
