= 1986 Stevenage Borough Council election =

1986 UK local government election

← 1984	8 May 1986	1987 →

13 of the 39 seats to Stevenage Borough Council 20 seats needed for a majority
	First party	Second party	Third party
Party	Labour	Alliance	Conservative
Seats before	26	11	2
Seats won	9	4	0
Seats after	29	9	1
Seat change	▲3	▼2	▼1
Popular vote	11,497	8,512	4,472
Percentage	46.9%	34.7%	18.2%
- Map showing the results of contested wards in the 1986 Stevenage Borough Council elections.
Council control before election
Labour
Council control after election
Labour

The 1986 Stevenage Borough Council election took place on 8 May 1986. This was on the same day as other local elections. One third of the council was up for election; the seats which were last contested in 1982. The Labour Party retained control of the council, which it had held continuously since its creation in 1973.

== Overall results ==
1986 Stevenage Borough Council Election
Party	Seats	Gains	Losses	Net gain/loss	Seats %	Votes %	Votes	+/−
Labour	9	3	0	▲1	69.2	46.9	11,497	▲8.6
Alliance	4	0	2	▼2	30.8	34.7	8,512	▼1.3
Conservative	0	0	1	▼1	0.0	18.2	4,472	▼7.6
Green	0	0	0	Steady	0.0	0.2	54	New
Total	13						24,535	
Labour hold								

All comparisons in vote share are to the corresponding 1982 election.

== Ward results ==
=== Bandley Hill ===
Location of Bandley Hill ward

Bandley Hill
Party	Candidate	Votes	%
Labour	A. Luhman	1,226	59.9%
Alliance	A. Wells-Collins	508	24.8%
Conservative	J. Bostock	313	15.3%
Turnout			36.8%
Labour hold			

=== Bedwell Plash ===
Location of Bedwell Plash ward

Bedwell Plash
Party	Candidate	Votes	%
Labour	W. Lawrence	1,072	62.2%
Alliance	P. Herbert	377	21.9%
Conservative	D. Franks	274	15.9%
Turnout			42.2%
Labour hold			

=== Chells ===
Location of Chells ward

Chells
Party	Candidate	Votes	%
Labour	J. Clark	767	55.0%
Alliance	S. Gordon-Walker	404	29.0%
Conservative	T. Finch	224	16.1%
Turnout			41.6%
Labour hold			

=== Longmeadow ===
Location of Longmeadow ward

Longmeadow
Party	Candidate	Votes	%
Alliance	S. Booth	1,301	50.0%
Labour	B. Underwood	916	35.2%
Conservative	P. Gonzalez	383	14.7%
Turnout			51.7%
Alliance hold			

=== Martins Wood ===
Location of Martins Wood ward

Martins Wood
Party	Candidate	Votes	%
Alliance	D. Kelleher	907	45.8%
Labour	J. Naduald	747	37.7%
Conservative	M. Mason	325	16.4%
Turnout			46.7%
Alliance hold			

=== Mobbsbury ===
Location of Mobbsbury ward

Mobbsbury
Party	Candidate	Votes	%
Alliance	R. Parker	910	47.9%
Labour	J. Watts	762	40.1%
Conservative	B. Potter	229	12.0%
Turnout			53.1%
Alliance hold			

=== Monkswood ===
Location of Monkswood ward

Monkswood
Party	Candidate	Votes	%
Labour	E. Webb	687	62.9%
Alliance	T. Younger	227	20.8%
Conservative	F. Haine	178	16.3%
Turnout			44.0%
Labour hold			

=== Old Stevenage ===
Location of Old Stevenage ward

Old Stevenage
Party	Candidate	Votes	%
Labour	B. Green	1,016	41.4%
Conservative	J. Carter	861	35.1%
Alliance	D. Christy	578	23.5%
Turnout			46.7%
Labour gain from Conservative			

=== Pin Green ===
Location of Pin Green ward

Pin Green
Party	Candidate	Votes	%
Labour	R. Smith	915	53.3%
Alliance	B. Clarke	471	27.4%
Conservative	M. Wyatt	331	19.3%
Turnout			43.4%
Labour hold			

=== Roebuck ===
Location of Roebuck ward

Roebuck
Party	Candidate	Votes	%
Labour	B. Dunnel	818	41.2%
Alliance	J. Lewis	762	38.3%
Conservative	P. McPartland	353	17.8%
Green	D. Paice	54	2.7%
Turnout			47.3%
Labour gain from Alliance			

=== St Nicholas ===
Location of St Nicholas ward

St Nicholas
Party	Candidate	Votes	%
Alliance	I. Hargreaves	709	43.2%
Labour	P. Alexander	655	39.9%
Conservative	T. Woods	276	16.8%
Turnout			44.6%
Alliance hold			

=== Shephall ===
Location of Shephall ward

Shephall
Party	Candidate	Votes	%
Labour	S. Greenfield	827	59.1%
Alliance	Shaw G.	382	27.3%
Conservative	F. Warner	191	13.6%
Turnout			40.0%
Labour hold			

=== Symonds Green ===
Location of Symonds Green ward

Symonds Green
Party	Candidate	Votes	%
Labour	D. Kissane	1,089	41.9%
Alliance	P. Gallagher	976	37.6%
Conservative	J. Halling	534	20.5%
Turnout			48.6%
Labour gain from Alliance			
