= 1995 Stevenage Borough Council election =

1995 UK local government election

← 1994	4 May 1995	1996 →

14 of the 39 seats to Stevenage Borough Council 20 seats needed for a majority
	First party	Second party	Third party
Party	Labour	Conservative	Liberal Democrats
Seats before	31	4	2
Seats won	14	0	0
Seats after	36	2	1
Seat change	▲5	▼2	▼1
Popular vote	13,438	3,124	3,310
Percentage	67.0%	15.6%	16.5%
- Map showing the results of contested wards in the 1995 Stevenage Borough Council elections.
Council control before election
Labour
Council control after election
Labour

The 1995 Stevenage Borough Council election took place on 4 May 1995. This was on the same day as other local elections. One third of the council was up for election; the seats which were last contested in 1991. There was also a second seat up for election in Martins Wood ward. The Labour Party retained control of the council, which it had held continuously since its creation in 1973.

== Overall results ==
1995 Stevenage Borough Council Election
Party	Seats	Gains	Losses	Net gain/loss	Seats %	Votes %	Votes	+/−
Labour	14	4	0	▲4	100.0	67.0	13,438	▲15.3
Liberal Democrats	1	0	1	▼1	0.0	16.5	3,310	▲1.9
Conservative	0	0	1	▼2		15.6	3,124	▼13.0
Militant Labour	0	0	2	▼2	0.0	0.9	189	▼4.1
Total	13						20,061	
Labour hold								

All comparisons in seats and vote share are to the corresponding 1991 election.

== Ward results ==
=== Bandley Hill ===
Location of Bandley Hill

Bandley Hill
Party	Candidate	Votes	%
Labour	Joan E. Lloyd	1,327	72.2%
Conservative	F. Warner	196	10.7%
Liberal Democrats	A. Segadelli	184	10.0%
Militant Labour	J. Horton	131	7.1%
Turnout			31.3%
Labour hold			

=== Bedwell Plash ===
Location of Bedwell Plash ward

Bedwell Plash
Party	Candidate	Votes	%
Labour	Hilda Lawrence	1,210	81.3%
Conservative	M. Wyatt	148	9.9%
Liberal Democrats	G. Knight	130	8.7%
Turnout			39.9%
Labour hold			

=== Longmeadow ===
Location of Longmeadow ward

Longmeadow
Party	Candidate	Votes	%
Labour	Sue Myson	1,298	64.4%
Conservative	M. Davies	412	20.4%
Liberal Democrats	A. Dodd	305	15.1%
Turnout			41.8%
Labour hold			

=== Martins Wood (2 seats) ===
Location of Martins Wood ward

Martins Wood
Party	Candidate	Votes	%
Labour	Lilian Strange	1,293	
Labour	S. Speller	1,287	
Conservative	M. Mason	455	
Conservative	E. Hegan	409	
Liberal Democrats	B. Segadelli	308	
Liberal Democrats	K. Taylor	306	
Turnout			32.6%
Labour hold			
Labour hold			

=== Mobbsbury ===
Location of Mobbsbury ward

Mobbsbury
Party	Candidate	Votes	%
Labour	Tanis G.M. Kent	793	47.8%
Liberal Democrats	R. Parker	778	46.9%
Conservative	S. Huetson	87	5.2%
Turnout			53.1%
Labour gain from Liberal Democrats			

=== Monkswood ===
Location of Monkswood ward

Monkswood
Party	Candidate	Votes	%
Labour	Brian Underwood	715	80.2%
Conservative	P. Rushforth	94	10.5%
Liberal Democrats	G. Robbins	83	9.3%
Turnout			38.5%
Labour hold			

=== Old Stevenage ===
Location of Old Stevenage ward

Old Stevenage
Party	Candidate	Votes	%
Labour	David Royall	1,294	55.9%
Conservative	J. Carter	796	34.4%
Liberal Democrats	J. Moorcroft	226	9.8%
Turnout			41.1%
Labour gain from Conservative			

=== Pin Green ===
Location of Pin Green ward

Pin Green
Party	Candidate	Votes	%
Labour	D. Weston	995	76.5%
Liberal Democrats	S. Grubert	162	12.5%
Conservative	H. Poole	143	11.0%
Turnout			35.6%
Labour hold			

=== Roebuck ===
Location of Roebuck ward

Roebuck
Party	Candidate	Votes	%
Labour	Alfred McCarthy	1,006	73.0%
Conservative	M. Hurst	216	15.7%
Liberal Democrats	A. Tron	157	11.4%
Turnout			35.0%
Labour hold			

=== St Nicholas ===
Location of St Nicholas ward

St Nicholas
Party	Candidate	Votes	%
Labour	Richard J. Henry	728	54.3%
Liberal Democrats	M. Griffith	475	35.4%
Conservative	S. Woods	138	10.3%
Turnout			38.0%
Labour gain from Liberal			

=== Shephall ===
Location of Shephall ward

Shephall
Party	Candidate	Votes	%
Labour	Brian P. Hall	863	80.9%
Liberal Democrats	G. Snell	79	7.4%
Conservative	D. Notley	67	6.3%
Militant Labour	M. Evans	58	5.4%
Turnout			34.1%
Labour hold			

=== Symonds Green ===
Location of Symonds Green ward

Symonds Green
Party	Candidate	Votes	%
Labour	J. Cox	1,450	73.8%
Conservative	R. Dimelow	308	15.7%
Liberal Democrats	J. Ward	206	10.5%
Turnout			36.8%
Labour hold			

=== Wellfield ===
Location of Wellfield ward

Wellfield
Party	Candidate	Votes	%
Labour	Judith Wallis-Price	466	62.4%
Liberal Democrats	M. Latham	217	29.0%
Conservative	L. Clark	64	8.6%
Turnout			46.5%
Labour gain from Liberal			
