= 1983 Stevenage Borough Council election =

1983 UK local government election

← 1982	5 May 1983	1984 →

13 of the 39 seats to Stevenage Borough Council 20 seats needed for a majority
	First party	Second party	Third party
Party	Labour	Alliance	Conservative
Seats before	29	8	2
Seats won	9	3	1
Seats after	27	10	2
Seat change	▼2	▲2	Steady
Popular vote	10,162	7,450	6,987
Percentage	41.3%	30.3%	28.4%
- Map showing the results of contested wards in the 1983 Stevenage Borough Council elections.
Council control before election
Labour
Council control after election
Labour

The 1983 Stevenage Borough Council election took place on 5 May 1983. This was on the same day as other local elections. One third of the council was up for election and the Labour Party retained control of the council, which it had held continuously since its creation in 1973.

== Overall results ==
1983 Stevenage Borough Council Election
Party	Seats	Gains	Losses	Net gain/loss	Seats %	Votes %	Votes	+/−
Labour	9	0	2	▼2	69.2	41.3	10,162	
Conservative	3	0	0	Steady	7.7	28.4	6,987	
Alliance	1	2	0	▲2	23.1	30.3	7,450	
Total	13						24,599	
Labour hold								

== Ward results ==
=== Bandley Hill ===
Location of Bandley Hill

Bandley Hill
Party	Candidate	Votes	%
Labour	J. Lloyd	1,040	51.4%
Alliance	P. Lucioli	528	26.1%
Conservative	F. Warner	455	22.5%
Turnout			44.6%
Labour hold			

=== Bedwell Plash ===
Location of Bedwell Plash ward

Bedwell Plash
Party	Candidate	Votes	%
Labour	H. Lawrence	1,109	54.8%
Conservative	B. Mann	507	25.0%
Alliance	R. Bull	409	20.2%
Turnout			49.3%
Labour hold			

=== Longmeadow ===
Location of Longmeadow ward

Longmeadow
Party	Candidate	Votes	%
Alliance	D. Peddie	883	37.1%
Conservative	H. Grant	771	32.4%
Labour	J. Tye	726	30.5%
Turnout			48.3%
Alliance gain from Labour			

=== Martins Wood ===
Location of Martins Wood ward

Martins Wood
Party	Candidate	Votes	%
Labour	B. Clark	674	37.0%
Alliance	P. Amor	633	34.7%
Conservative	T. Hegan	515	28.3%
Turnout			44.7%
Labour hold			

=== Mobbsbury ===
Location of Mobbsbury ward

Mobbsbury
Party	Candidate	Votes	%
Labour	J. Gotobed	755	41.7%
Conservative	M. Lovett	566	31.3%
Alliance	L. Atkins	488	27.0%
Turnout			50.1%
Labour hold			

=== Monkswood ===
Location of Monkswood ward

Monkswood
Party	Candidate	Votes	%
Labour	M. Cherney	698	51.0%
Alliance	H. Kearney	382	27.9%
Conservative	W. Travennor	289	21.1%
Turnout			53.7%
Labour hold			

=== Old Stevenage ===
Location of Old Stevenage ward

Old Stevenage
Party	Candidate	Votes	%
Conservative	J. Boyd	1,120	45.4%
Labour	A. Spears	795	32.2%
Alliance	K. Taylor	554	22.4%
Turnout			49.0%
Conservative hold			

=== Pin Green ===
Location of Pin Green ward

Pin Green
Party	Candidate	Votes	%
Labour	D. Weston	755	40.1%
Alliance	J. Lucioli	589	31.3%
Conservative	M. Mason	540	28.7%
Turnout			47.8%
Labour hold			

=== Roebuck ===
Location of Roebuck ward

Roebuck
Party	Candidate	Votes	%
Labour	J. Cockerton	834	40.0%
Alliance	G. Batley	679	32.6%
Conservative	S. McPartland	570	27.4%
Turnout			48.6%
Labour hold			

=== St Nicholas ===
Location of St Nicholas ward

St Nicholas
Party	Candidate	Votes	%
Alliance	C. Cuthbert	592	41.0%
Labour	M. Downing	511	35.4%
Conservative	T. Woods	340	23.6%
Turnout			38.8%
Alliance gain from Labour			

=== Shephall ===
Location of Shephall ward

Shephall
Party	Candidate	Votes	%
Labour	B. Hall	866	51.9%
Alliance	M. Boutell	518	31.0%
Conservative	E. Kolinski	285	17.1%
Turnout			46.6%
Labour hold			

=== Symonds Green ===
Location of Symonds Green ward

Symonds Green
Party	Candidate	Votes	%
Labour	M. Cotter	1,115	40.5%
Conservative	G. Balderstone	825	30.0%
Alliance	D. Eaton	811	29.5%
Turnout			51.2%
Labour hold			

=== Wellfield ===
Location of Wellfield ward

Wellfield
Party	Candidate	Votes	%
Alliance	D. Hills	370	42.4%
Labour	N. Cook	284	32.6%
Conservative	B. Potter	218	25.0
Turnout			50.9%
Labour hold			
