= 1991 Stevenage Borough Council election =

1991 UK local government election

← 1990	2 May 1991	1992 →

13 of the 39 seats to Stevenage Borough Council 20 seats needed for a majority
	First party	Second party
Party	Labour	Liberal
Seats before	32	0
Seats won	9	2
Seats after	35	2
Seat change	▲3	▲2
Popular vote	11,718	1,008
Percentage	51.7%	4.4%
	Third party	Fourth party
Party	Conservative	Liberal Democrats
Seats before	1	6
Seats won	1	1
Seats after	1	1
Seat change	Steady	▼5
Popular vote	6,478	3,319
Percentage	28.6%	14.6%
- Map showing the results of contested wards in the 1991 Stevenage Borough Council elections.
Council control before election
Labour
Council control after election
Labour

The 1991 Stevenage Borough Council election took place on 2 May 1991. This was on the same day as other local elections. One third of the council was up for election; the seats which were last contested in 1987. The Labour Party retained control of the council, which it had held continuously since its creation in 1973.

== Overall results ==
1991 Stevenage Borough Council Election
Party	Seats	Gains	Losses	Net gain/loss	Seats %	Votes %	Votes	+/−
Labour	9	3	0	▲3	69.2	51.7	11,718	▲11.2
Conservative	1	0	0	Steady	7.7	28.6	6,478	▲5.2
Liberal Democrats	1	0	5	▼5	7.7	14.6	3,319	▼16.5
Liberal	2	2	0	Steady	15.4	4.4	1,008	New
Green	0	0	0	Steady	0.0	0.6	133	New
Total	13						22,656	
Labour hold								

All comparisons in seats and vote share are to the corresponding 1987 election.

== Ward results ==
=== Bandley Hill ===
Location of Bandley Hill

Bandley Hill
Party	Candidate	Votes	%
Labour	J. Lloyd	1,387	68.0%
Conservative	F. Warner	653	32.0%
Turnout			33.6%
Labour hold			

=== Bedwell Plash ===
Location of Bedwell Plash ward

Bedwell Plash
Party	Candidate	Votes	%
Labour	H. Lawrence	1,197	73.8%
Conservative	P. Gonzalez	425	26.2%
Turnout			41.1%
Labour hold			

=== Longmeadow ===
Location of Longmeadow ward

Longmeadow
Party	Candidate	Votes	%
Labour	S. Myson	951	40.7%
Liberal Democrats	P. Akhurst	840	36.0%
Conservative	L. Bradshaw	480	20.6%
Green	W. Hoyes	63	2.7%
Turnout			46.9%
Labour gain from Liberal Democrats			

=== Martins Wood ===
Location of Martins Wood ward

Martins Wood
Party	Candidate	Votes	%
Labour	L. Strange	929	40.4%
Conservative	I. Sills	873	38.0%
Liberal Democrats	K. Taylor	497	21.6%
Turnout			42.1%
Labour hold			

=== Mobbsbury ===
Location of Mobbsbury ward

Mobbsbury
Party	Candidate	Votes	%
Liberal Democrats	R. Parker	869	50.9%
Labour	J. Watts	637	37.3%
Conservative	J. Whittaker	201	11.8%
Turnout			51.6%
Liberal Democrats hold			

=== Monkswood ===
Location of Monkswood ward

Monkswood
Party	Candidate	Votes	%
Labour	B. Underwood	717	75.6%
Conservative	A. Wells	231	24.4%
Turnout			39.0%
Labour hold			

=== Old Stevenage ===
Location of Old Stevenage ward

Old Stevenage
Party	Candidate	Votes	%
Conservative	J. Carter	1,195	47.9%
Labour	J. Cox	1,043	41.8%
Liberal Democrats	D. Christy	256	10.3%
Turnout			47.2%
Conservative hold			

=== Pin Green ===
Location of Pin Green ward

Pin Green
Party	Candidate	Votes	%
Labour	D. Weston	917	60.2%
Conservative	C. Aylin	366	24.0%
Liberal Democrats	A. Simister	170	11.2%
Green	R. Gurney	70	4.6%
Turnout			44.5%
Labour hold			

=== Roebuck ===
Location of Roebuck ward

Roebuck
Party	Candidate	Votes	%
Labour	A. McCarthy	903	50.5%
Conservative	S. McPartland	517	28.9%
Liberal Democrats	R. Baskerville	369	20.6%
Turnout			43.6%
Labour gain from Liberal Democrats			

=== St Nicholas ===
Location of St Nicholas ward

St Nicholas
Party	Candidate	Votes	%
Liberal	P. Gallagher	637	43.1%
Labour	M. Pelling	541	36.6%
Conservative	J. Gordon	301	20.4%
Turnout			40.4%
Liberal gain from Liberal Democrats			

=== Shephall ===
Location of Shephall ward

Shephall
Party	Candidate	Votes	%
Labour	B. Hall	979	78.4%
Conservative	S. Huetson	269	21.6%
Turnout			36.9%
Labour hold			

=== Symonds Green ===
Location of Symonds Green ward

Symonds Green
Party	Candidate	Votes	%
Labour	M. Cotter	1,244	52.2%
Liberal Democrats	M. Notley	821	34.5%
Conservative	F. Price	318	13.3%
Turnout			44.3%
Labour hold			

=== Wellfield ===
Location of Wellfield ward

Wellfield
Party	Candidate	Votes	%
Liberal	J. Wallis-Price	371	47.0%
Labour	R. Strange	273	34.6%
Conservative	J. Halling	146	18.5%
Turnout			47.0%
Liberal gain from Liberal Democrats			
