= 1999 Stevenage Borough Council election =

1999 UK local government election

← 1998	6 May 1999	2000 →

All 39 seats to Stevenage Borough Council 20 seats needed for a majority
- Turnout: 29.9%
	First party	Second party	Third party
Party	Labour	Liberal Democrats	Conservative
Seats before	37	2	0
Seats won	33	1	3
Seats after	33	3	3
Seat change	▼4	▲1	▲3
Percentage	54.9%	25.3%	19.0%
- Map showing the results of contested wards in the 1999 Stevenage Borough Council elections.
Council control before election
Labour
Council control after election
Labour

Elections to Stevenage Council were held on 6 May 1999. The whole council was up for election with boundary changes since the last election in 1998. The Labour Party stayed in overall control of the council.

== Election result ==
Stevenage local election result 1999
Party	Seats	Gains	Losses	Net gain/loss	Seats %	Votes %	Votes	+/−
Labour	33			-4	84.6			
Liberal Democrats	3			+1	7.7			
Conservative	3			+3	7.7			

== Ward results ==
=== Bandley Hill ===
Location of Bandley Hill ward

Bandley Hill
Party	Candidate	Votes	%
Labour	Robert Woodward	789	
Labour	Joan Lloyd	774	
Labour	Lilian Strange	764	
Conservative	Sherree Kerby	238	
Conservative	Claire Halling	234	
Socialist Alternative	Jean Halling	62	
Turnout			23%

=== Bedwell ===
Location of Bedwell ward

Bedwell
Party	Candidate	Votes	%
Labour	Elizabeth Harrington	1,135	
Labour	David Cullen	1,097	
Labour	Brian Underwood	1,097	
Conservative	James Bellers	235	
Liberal Democrats	George Robbins	262	
Liberal Democrats	Sydney Grubert	246	
Turnout			31%

=== Chells ===
Location of Chells ward

Chells
Party	Candidate	Votes	%
Labour	Kenneth Vale	861	
Labour	Pamela Stuart	854	
Labour	Gill Tuffin	830	
Liberal Democrats	Leonard Lambert	355	
Liberal Democrats	Tracey MacFadyen	332	
Liberal Democrats	Steve Destafeno	282	
Conservative	Susan Smith	190	
Turnout			28%

=== Longmeadow ===
Location of Longmeadow ward

Longmeadow
Party	Candidate	Votes	%
Labour	Ann Webb	749	
Labour	Suzanne Myson	710	
Labour	Bruce Jackson	704	
Liberal Democrats	Patricia Akhurst	392	
Conservative	Val Ovenden	376	
Liberal Democrats	Margaret Latham	329	
Liberal Democrats	Denise Baskerville	314	
Green	Bill Hoyes	102	
Turnout			30%

=== Manor ===
Location of Manor ward

Manor
Party	Candidate	Votes	%
Liberal Democrats	Robin Parker	1,018	
Liberal Democrats	Lis Knight	948	
Liberal Democrats	Graham Snell	939	
Labour	Jeanette Thomas	528	
Labour	Jacqueline Hollywell	501	
Labour	Mahendran Chelvachandran	479	
Conservative	Stuart Greaves	460	
Conservative	Edward Hegan	426	
Conservative	Gwen Hegan	421	
Turnout			43%

=== Martins Wood ===
Location of Martins Wood ward

Martins Wood
Party	Candidate	Votes	%
Labour	Michael Patston	793	
Labour	Dave Monaghan	776	
Labour	David Royall	764	
Liberal Democrats	Barbara Segadelli	427	
Turnout			25%

=== Old Town ===
Location of Old Town ward

Old Town
Party	Candidate	Votes	%
Labour	Michael Downing	969	
Labour	Pamela Gallagher	966	
Labour	Hugh Tessier	886	
Conservative	Victoria Greaves	498	
Liberal Democrats	Jennifer Moorcroft	433	
Turnout			33%

=== Pin Green ===
Location of Pin Green ward

Pin Green
Party	Candidate	Votes	%
Labour	Reg Smith	1,003	
Labour	Tanis Kent	981	
Labour	Simon Speller	937	
Liberal Democrats	Heather Snell	352	
Turnout			28%

=== Roebuck ===
Location of Roebuck ward

Roebuck
Party	Candidate	Votes	%
Labour	John Gardner	742	
Labour	Alfred McCarthy	734	
Labour	Brian Dunnell	694	
Conservative	Matthew Hurst	350	
Liberal Democrats	Peter Wilkins	483	
Turnout			28%

=== St Nicholas ===
Location of St Nicholas ward

St Nicholas
Party	Candidate	Votes	%
Labour	Judith Wallis Price	768	
Labour	Stanley Munden	753	
Labour	Richard Henry	752	
Liberal Democrats	Mary Griffith	388	
Conservative	Terri Woods	295	
Turnout			27%

=== Shephall ===
Location of Shephall ward

Shephall
Party	Candidate	Votes	%
Labour	Eddie Webb	926	
Labour	Bob Clark	895	
Labour	Brian Hall	884	
Liberal Democrats	Gordon Knight	241	
Conservative	Freda Warner	229	
Turnout			28%

=== Symonds Green ===
Location of Symonds Green ward

Symonds Green
Party	Candidate	Votes	%
Labour	David Kissane	988	
Labour	Sharon Taylor	884	
Labour	Anthony Turner	847	
Conservative	Margaret Notley	402	
Conservative	Claire Halling	376	
Conservative	Jean Halling	363	
Liberal Democrats	Cecil Lewis	181	
Turnout			31%

=== Woodfield ===
Location of Woodfield ward

Woodfield
Party	Candidate	Votes	%
Conservative	Graham Clark	526	
Conservative	Marion Mason	514	
Conservative	Peter McPartland	510	
Labour	Caroline Latif	424	
Labour	Patrick Newman	417	
Labour	Omar Ismail	374	
Liberal Democrats	Elizabeth Sturges	145	
Turnout			34%
