= 1979 Stevenage Borough Council election =

1979 UK local government election

← 1976	3 May 1979	1980 →

All 39 seats to Stevenage Borough Council 20 seats needed for a majority
	First party	Second party
Party	Labour	Conservative
Seats before	28	6
Seats won	35	4
Seat change	▲7	▼2
Popular vote	19,218	15,406
Percentage	46.5%	37.3%
- Map showing the results of contested wards in the 1979 Stevenage Borough Council elections.
Council control before election
Labour
Council control after election
Labour

The 1979 Stevenage Borough Council election took place on 3 May 1979. This was on the same day as other local elections. The entire council was up for election and the Labour Party retained control of the council.

== Overall results ==
1979 Stevenage Borough Council Election
Party	Seats	Gains	Losses	Net gain/loss	Seats %	Votes %	Votes	+/−
Labour	35				89.7	46.5	19,218	▲1.5
Conservative	4				10.3	37.3	15,406	▼4.0
Liberal	0				0	16.2	6,712	▲9.9
Total	39						41,336	
Labour hold								

== Ward results ==
=== Bandley Hill (3 seats) ===
Location of Bandley Hill ward

Bandley Hill (3 seats)
Party	Candidate	Votes	%
Labour	J. Lloyd	1,714	
Labour	A. Luhman	1,639	
Labour	B. Dunnell	1,601	
Conservative	L. Jordan	1,160	
Conservative	D. Dix	1,087	
Conservative	M. Tate	963	
Liberal	D. Clark	598	
Turnout			77.6%
Labour win (new seat)			
Labour win (new seat)			
Labour win (new seat)			

=== Bedwell Plash (3 seats) ===
Location of Bedwell Plash ward

Bedwell Plash (3 seats)
Party	Candidate	Votes	%
Labour	H. Lawrence	1,710	
Labour	W. Lawrence	1,695	
Labour	D. Cullen	1,642	
Conservative	A. Bradley	1,103	
Conservative	M. Henry	1,063	
Conservative	D. Thomas	1,036	
Liberal	P. Roberts	425	
Turnout			75.6%
Labour win (new seat)			
Labour win (new seat)			
Labour win (new seat)			

=== Chells (2 seats) ===
Location of Chells ward

Chells (2 seats)
Party	Candidate	Votes	%
Labour	J. Clarke	1,414	
Labour	K. Vale	1,303	
Conservative	A. Bunting	903	
Conservative	D. Brown	892	
Liberal	M. Reynolds	373	
Turnout			80.2%
Labour win (new seat)			
Labour win (new seat)			

=== Longmeadow (3 seats) ===
Location of Longmeadow ward

Longmeadow (3 seats)
Party	Candidate	Votes	%
Labour	J. Tye	1,363	
Labour	W. Sheaff	1,349	
Labour	A. Greenslade	1,298	
Conservative	H. Gladwin	1,285	
Conservative	B. Reid	1,284	
Conservative	M. Stannard	1,205	
Liberal	E. Brook	653	
Turnout			79.1%
Labour win (new seat)			
Labour win (new seat)			
Labour win (new seat)			

=== Martins Wood (3 seats) ===
Location of Martins Wood ward

Martins Wood (3 seats)
Party	Candidate	Votes	%
Labour	R. Clark	1,286	
Labour	D. Weston	1,261	
Labour	K. Wilkinson	1,216	
Conservative	E. Hegan	1,211	
Conservative	M. Stelling	1,211	
Conservative	N. Sampath	1,097	
Liberal	K. Taylor	641	
Turnout			79.8%
Labour win (new seat)			
Labour win (new seat)			
Labour win (new seat)			

=== Mobbsbury (3 seats) ===
Location of Mobbsbury ward

Mobbsbury (3 seats)
Party	Candidate	Votes	%
Labour	J. Gotobed	1,225	
Labour	J. Graham	1,138	
Conservative	B. Hancock	1,118	
Labour	J. Turnock	1,095	
Conservative	K. Clewer	1,043	
Conservative	F. Lasenby	992	
Liberal	D. Roberts	470	
Turnout			81.8%
Labour win (new seat)			
Labour win (new seat)			
Conservative win (new seat)			

=== Monkswood (3 seats) ===
Location of Monkswood ward

Monkswood (3 seats)
Party	Candidate	Votes	%
Labour	L. Cummins	1,082	
Labour	K. Hopkins	1,030	
Labour	A. Wiltshire	975	
Conservative	D. Eaton	702	
Conservative	B. Lavers	673	
Conservative	R. Kent	670	
Liberal	G. Robbins	320	
Turnout			78.9%
Labour win (new seat)			
Labour win (new seat)			
Labour win (new seat)			

=== Old Stevenage (3 seats) ===
Location of Old Stevenage ward

Old Stevenage (3 seats)
Party	Candidate	Votes	%
Conservative	J. Boyd	1,834	
Conservative	W. Boyd	1,787	
Labour	H. Morris	1,624	
Labour	K. Stutley	1,596	
Labour	R. Green	1,483	
Conservative	J. Briscoe	1,259	
Liberal	S. Booth	587	
Turnout			81.7%
Conservative win (new seat)			
Conservative win (new seat)			
Labour win (new seat)			

=== Pin Green (3 seats) ===
Location of Pin Green ward

Pin Green (3 seats)
Party	Candidate	Votes	%
Labour	K. Taylor	1,425	
Labour	R. Smith	1,373	
Labour	A. Campbell	1,366	
Conservative	K. McKechnie	1,173	
Conservative	A. Hurst	1,126	
Conservative	O. Welch	1,111	
Liberal	L. Atkins	521	
Turnout			80.6%
Labour win (new seat)			
Labour win (new seat)			
Labour win (new seat)			

=== Roebuck (3 seats) ===
Location of Roebuck ward

Roebuck (3 seats)
Party	Candidate	Votes	%
Labour	J. Cockerton	1,322	
Conservative	A. Walker	1,204	
Labour	S. Munden	1,165	
Labour	E. Baker	1,143	
Conservative	E. Wignall	1,123	
Conservative	F. Schofield	1,118	
Liberal	M. Boutell	432	
Turnout			82.6%
Labour win (new seat)			
Conservative win (new seat)			
Labour win (new seat)			

=== St Nicholas (3 seats) ===
Location of St Nicholas ward

St Nicholas (3 seats)
Party	Candidate	Votes	%
Labour	T. Corner	1,355	
Labour	B. Beasley	1,282	
Labour	R. Fowler	1,156	
Conservative	W. Dehany	937	
Conservative	A. Dehany	925	
Conservative	S. Woods	867	
Liberal	I. Hargreaves	514	
Turnout			76.0%

=== Shephall (3 seats) ===
Location of Shephall ward

Shephall (3 seats)
Party	Candidate	Votes	%
Labour	B. Hall	1,465	
Labour	S. Greenfield	1,464	
Labour	I. Johnson	1,412	
Conservative	A. Mann	845	
Conservative	C. Aylin	721	
Conservative	F. Warner	714	
Liberal	G. Reynolds	462	
Turnout			75.8%
Labour win (new seat)			
Labour win (new seat)			
Labour win (new seat)			

=== Symonds Green (3 seats) ===
Location of Symonds Green ward

Symonds Green (3 seats)
Party	Candidate	Votes	%
Labour	M. Cotter	1,563	
Labour	G. Balderstone	1,552	
Labour	L. Robbins	1,461	
Conservative	G. Hook	1,450	
Conservative	P. Nightingale	1,427	
Conservative	J. Scarratt	1,423	
Liberal	V. Bartlett	541	
Turnout			76.2%
Labour win (new seat)			
Labour win (new seat)			
Labour win (new seat)			

=== Wellfield (1 seat) ===
Location of Wellfield ward

Wellfield (1 seat)
Party	Candidate	Votes	%
Labour	C. Corner	670	
Conservative	P. Jenkins	481	
Liberal	L. Peal	175	
Turnout			78.6%
Labour win (new seat)			
