= 1987 Stevenage Borough Council election =

1987 UK local government election

← 1986	7 May 1987	1988 →

13 of the 39 seats to Stevenage Borough Council 20 seats needed for a majority
	First party	Second party	Third party
Party	Labour	Alliance	Conservative
Seats before	29	9	1
Seats won	6	6	1
Seats after	26	12	1
Seat change	▼3	▲3	Steady
Popular vote	10,506	9,356	6,064
Percentage	40.5%	36.1%	23.4%
- Map showing the results of contested wards in the 1987 Stevenage Borough Council elections.
Council control before election
Labour
Council control after election
Labour

The 1987 Stevenage Borough Council election took place on 7 May 1987, the same day as other local elections. One-third of the council seats last contested in 1983 were up for election. The Labour Party retained control of the council, which it had held continuously since its creation in 1973.

== Overall results ==
1987 Stevenage Borough Council Election
Party	Seats	Gains	Losses	Net gain/loss	Seats %	Votes %	Votes	+/−
Labour	6	0	3	▼3	46.2	40.5	10,506	▼0.8
Alliance	6	3	0	▲3	46.2	36.1	9,356	▲5.8
Conservative	1	0	0	Steady	7.7	23.4	6,064	▼5.0
Total	13						25,926	
Labour hold								

All comparisons in vote share are to the corresponding 1983 election.

== Ward results ==
=== Bandley Hill ===
Location of Bandley Hill

Bandley Hill
Party	Candidate	Votes	%
Labour	J. Lloyd	1,161	52.3%
Alliance	D. Cleary	593	26.7%
Conservative	F. Warner	468	21.1%
Turnout			38.7%
Labour hold			

=== Bedwell Plash ===
Location of Bedwell Plash ward

Bedwell Plash
Party	Candidate	Votes	%
Labour	H. Lawrence	1,030	56.0%
Alliance	P. Herbert	441	24.0%
Conservative	D. Franks	368	20.0%
Turnout			45.7%
Labour hold			

=== Longmeadow ===
Location of Longmeadow ward

Longmeadow
Party	Candidate	Votes	%
Alliance	P. Akhurst	1,207	46.0%
Labour	J. Tye	788	30.1%
Conservative	S. Ashby	627	23.9%
Turnout			50.7%
Alliance gain from Labour			

=== Martins Wood ===
Location of Martins Wood ward

Martins Wood
Party	Candidate	Votes	%
Alliance	B. Clarke	1,073	47.5%
Labour	B. Clark	691	30.6%
Conservative	M. Mason	494	21.9%
Turnout			51.8%
Alliance gain from Labour			

=== Mobbsbury ===
Location of Mobbsbury ward

Mobbsbury
Party	Candidate	Votes	%
Alliance	B. Clark	932	47.5%
Labour	J. Gotobed	682	34.7%
Conservative	T. Ffinch	350	17.8%
Turnout			55.2%
Alliance gain from Labour			

=== Monkswood ===
Location of Monkswood ward

Monkswood
Party	Candidate	Votes	%
Labour	B. Underwood	680	57.8%
Alliance	P. Younger	264	22.4%
Conservative	F. Haine	232	19.7%
Turnout			48.1%
Labour hold			

=== Old Stevenage ===
Location of Old Stevenage ward

Old Stevenage
Party	Candidate	Votes	%
Conservative	J. Carter	1,120	41.9%
Labour	M. Cherney	900	33.7%
Alliance	D. Christy	652	24.4%
Turnout			50.2%
Conservative hold			

=== Pin Green ===
Location of Pin Green ward

Pin Green
Party	Candidate	Votes	%
Labour	D. Weston	815	46.1%
Alliance	T. Osborne	502	28.4%
Conservative	C. Aylin	451	25.5%
Turnout			44.5%
Labour hold			

=== Roebuck ===
Location of Roebuck ward

Roebuck
Party	Candidate	Votes	%
Alliance	P. Perry	1,012	42.8%
Labour	J. Cockerton	849	35.9%
Conservative	S. McPartland	504	21.3%
Turnout			56.3%
Alliance gain from Labour			

=== St Nicholas ===
Location of St Nicholas ward

St Nicholas
Party	Candidate	Votes	%
Alliance	P. Gallagher	852	45.8%
Labour	P. Alexander	610	32.8%
Conservative	S. Woods	397	21.4%
Turnout			49.8%
Alliance gain from Labour			

=== Shephall ===
Location of Shephall ward

Shephall
Party	Candidate	Votes	%
Labour	B. Hall	873	57.6%
Alliance	A. Wells	395	26.1%
Conservative	S. Doolan	248	16.4%
Turnout			43.3%
Labour hold			

=== Symonds Green ===
Location of Symonds Green ward

Symonds Green
Party	Candidate	Votes	%
Labour	M. Cotter	1,187	43.1%
Alliance	J. Blundell	932	33.8%
Conservative	J. Halling	636	23.1%
Turnout			51.5%
Labour hold			

=== Wellfield ===
Location of Wellfield ward

Wellfield
Party	Candidate	Votes	%
Alliance	D. Hills	501	55.1%
Labour	T. Alderton	240	26.4%
Conservative	M. Wyatt	169	18.6%
Turnout			53.8%
Alliance hold			
