= 2026 Stevenage Borough Council election =

2026 English local government election

- 7 May 2026

14 out of 39 seats to Stevenage Borough Council (including 1 by-election) 20 seats needed for a majority
	First party	Second party
Leader	Richard Henry	Mason Humberstone (defeated)
Party	Labour Co-op	Reform
Last election	32 seats, 51.8%	0 seats, 2.8%
Seats before	30	2
Seats won	3	9
Seats after	22	10
Seat change	▼8	▲8
Popular vote	6,286	9,616
Percentage	23.0%	35.2%
Swing	▼28.8%	▲32.4%
	Third party	Fourth party
Leader	Andy McGuinness	Phil Bibby
Party	Liberal Democrats	Conservative
Last election	6 seats, 17.1%	1 seat, 19.2%
Seats before	6	1
Seats won	2	0
Seats after	6	1
Seat change	Steady	Steady
Popular vote	3,426	3,643
Percentage	12.5%	13.3%
Swing	▼4.6%	▼5.9%
- Winner of each seat at the 2026 Stevenage Borough Council election.
Leader before election
Richard Henry
Labour Co-op
Leader after election
Richard Henry
Labour Co-op

The 2026 Stevenage Borough Council election took place on 7 May 2026, alongside the other local elections across the United Kingdom being held on the same day, to elect 14 of 39 members of Stevenage Borough Council in Hertfordshire, England.

Reform UK won 9 of the 14 seats contested at this election, but Labour retained its overall majority on the council.

== Summary ==
=== Background ===
In 2024, the Labour Party retained majority control of the council. In January 2026, the council asked for the election to be postponed pending local government reorganisation. However it was rescheduled on 16 February 2026.

=== Election result ===
2026 Stevenage Borough Council election
Party	This election				Full council			This election		
Party	Candidates	Seats	Net	Seats %	Other	Total	Total %	Votes	Votes %	+/−
Labour Co-op	{{{candidates}}}	3	▼8	21.4	20	23	57.5	6,286	23.0	–28.8
Reform	{{{candidates}}}	9	▲8	64.3	1	10	25.0	9,616	35.2	+32.4
Liberal Democrats	{{{candidates}}}	2	Steady	14.3	4	6	15.0	3,426	12.5	–4.6
Conservative	{{{candidates}}}	0	Steady	0.0	1	1	2.5	3,643	13.3	–5.9
Green	{{{candidates}}}	0	Steady	0.0	0	0	0.0	4,279	15.7	+8.1
TUSC	{{{candidates}}}	0	Steady	0.0	0	0	0.0	73	0.3	–1.2

=== Council composition ===
After 2024 election		Before 2026 election	
Party	Seats	Party	Seats
Labour	32	Labour	30
Liberal Democrats	6	Liberal Democrats	6
Reform	0	Reform	2
Conservative	1	Conservative	1

Changes 2024–2026:

- November 2024: Graham Snell (Liberal Democrats) dies – by-election held February 2025
- February 2025: Peter Wilkins (Liberal Democrats) wins by-election
- April 2025: Conor McGrath (Labour) leaves party to sit as an independent
- May 2025: Conor McGrath (independent) resigns – by-election held June 2025
- June 2025: Dermot Kehoe (Labour) wins by-election
- September 2025:
  - Anne Wells (Labour) resigns – by-election held October 2025
  - Mason Humberstone (Labour) joins Reform
- October 2025: Rob Henry (Reform) gains by-election from Labour

== Incumbents ==
Ward	Incumbent councillor	Party	Re-standing
Almond Hill	Jeannette Thomas	Labour Co-op	Yes
Bandley Hill & Poplars	Kamal Choudhury	Labour Co-op	Yes
Bedwell	Ellie Plater	Labour Co-op	Yes
Chells	Stephen Booth	Liberal Democrats	No
Longmeadow	Akin Elekolusi	Labour Co-op	Yes
Manor	Peter Wilkins (Note: Elected at the 2025 Manor by-election.)	Liberal Democrats	Yes
Martins Wood	Carolina Veres	Labour Co-op	Yes (Note: Stood in St Nicholas ward.)
Old Town	Mason Humberstone (Note: Originally elected as Labour, but later defected to Reform.)	Reform	Yes
Roebuck	Alistair Gordon	Labour Co-op	Yes
Shephall	Simon Speller	Labour Co-op	Yes
St Nicholas	Claire Parris	Labour Co-op	Yes
Symonds Green	Ceara Roopchand	Labour Co-op	Yes (Note: Standing in Woodfield ward.)
Woodfield	Robert Boyle	Labour	No

== Ward results ==
=== Almond Hill ===
Almond Hill
Party	Candidate	Votes	%	±%
Reform	Jody Hanafin	717	34.4	N/A
Green	Becca Watts	615	29.5	+8.3
Labour Co-op	Jeannette Thomas*	392	18.8	–20.8
Conservative	Catherine Bibby	228	10.9	–11.4
Liberal Democrats	Charles Littleton	132	6.3	–10.6
Majority		102	4.9	N/A
Turnout		2,084	38.2	+9.1
Registered electors		~5,455		
Reform gain from Labour Co-op				

=== Bandley Hill & Poplars ===
Bandley Hill & Poplars
Party	Candidate	Votes	%	±%
Reform	Wendy Rouse	842	40.3	+27.4
Labour Co-op	Kamal Choudhury*	453	21.7	–14.6
Conservative	David Stubbs	291	13.9	–11.8
Green	Shaun Rockwood	269	12.9	+4.0
Liberal Democrats	Andrew Anderson	225	10.8	–2.3
TUSC	Martin Slade	7	0.3	–2.7
Majority		389	18.6	N/A
Turnout		2,087	38.3	+5.8
Registered electors		~5,449		
Reform gain from Labour Co-op		Swing	▲21.0	

=== Bedwell ===
Bedwell
Party	Candidate	Votes	%	±%
Labour Co-op	Ellie Plater*	626	34.6	–11.1
Reform	Dan Ashton	589	32.5	N/A
Green	Harrison Pinner	294	16.2	+1.7
Conservative	Adam Mitchell	169	9.3	–9.6
Liberal Democrats	Emma Ewart	125	6.9	–8.3
TUSC	Mark Pickersgill	7	0.4	–5.2
Majority		37	2.1	N/A
Turnout		1,810	33.9	+6.6
Registered electors		~5,339		
Labour Co-op hold				

=== Chells ===
Chells
Party	Candidate	Votes	%	±%
Liberal Democrats	Jaysica Marvell	701	35.3	–7.0
Reform	Gary Smith	651	32.8	N/A
Labour	Yvonne Pendlebury	235	11.8	–17.3
Green	Dave Ingarfill	227	11.4	–0.7
Conservative	Matthew Wyatt	172	8.7	–7.9
Majority		50	2.5	N/A
Turnout		1,986	36.1	+7.6
Registered electors		~5,501		
Liberal Democrats hold				

=== Longmeadow ===
Longmeadow
Party	Candidate	Votes	%	±%
Reform	Jan Bainbridge	759	37.3	+28.5
Conservative	Bret Facey	487	23.9	–2.9
Labour Co-op	Akin Elekolusi*	360	17.7	–14.1
Green	Wendy Attwell	258	12.7	–9.6
Liberal Democrats	Stephen Booth	159	7.8	–0.4
TUSC	Helen Kerr	14	0.7	–1.5
Majority		272	13.4	N/A
Turnout		2,037	40.3	+3.5
Registered electors		~5,055		
Reform gain from Labour Co-op		Swing	▲15.7	

=== Manor ===
Manor
Party	Candidate	Votes	%	±%
Liberal Democrats	Peter Wilkins*	955	42.0	–13.6
Reform	Julia Lawrence	737	32.4	N/A
Green	Stephani Mok	208	9.2	–0.2
Conservative	Marcel Houps	187	8.2	–7.2
Labour Co-op	Maureen McKay	185	8.1	–11.6
Majority		218	9.6	N/A
Turnout		2,272	41.9	+8.6
Registered electors		~5,422		
Liberal Democrats hold				

=== Martins Wood ===
Martins Wood
Party	Candidate	Votes	%	±%
Reform	John Blackwood	799	41.9	+28.6
Labour	Thea Pendlebury	440	23.0	–16.6
Green	Maria Fekete	268	14.0	+2.2
Conservative	Alex Farquharson	200	10.5	–10.4
Liberal Democrats	Jill Brinkworth	195	10.2	–1.1
TUSC	Mark Gentleman	7	0.4	–2.6
Majority		359	18.9	N/A
Turnout		1,909	38.1	+7.2
Registered electors		~5,010		
Reform gain from Labour Co-op		Swing	▲22.6	

=== Old Town ===
Old Town
Party	Candidate	Votes	%	±%
Labour Co-op	Graham Spencer	542	30.4	–9.2
Reform	Mason Humberstone*	509	28.6	N/A
Green	Andy Whitmore	326	18.3	+2.0
Conservative	Richard Liversidge	272	15.3	–12.9
Liberal Democrats	Neil Brinkworth	122	6.9	–5.3
TUSC	Mark Kerr	10	0.6	–3.1
Majority		33	1.8	N/A
Turnout		1,781	41.8	+6.1
Registered electors		~4,261		
Labour Co-op gain from Reform				

=== Roebuck ===
Roebuck
Party	Candidate	Votes	%	±%
Reform	Liam Morrell-Phillips	667	38.0	N/A
Labour Co-op	Alistair Gordon*	407	23.2	–16.1
Green	Sara Warden	279	15.9	+0.4
Conservative	Pawel Gora	238	13.6	–9.8
Liberal Democrats	Nigel Bye	163	9.3	–7.5
Majority		260	14.8	N/A
Turnout		1,754	35.3	+7.8
Registered electors		~4,969		
Reform gain from Labour Co-op				

=== Shephall ===
Shephall
Party	Candidate	Votes	%	±%
Reform	Ricki Rands	670	39.4	N/A
Labour Co-op	Simon Speller*	505	29.7	–17.7
Green	Dan Cornwell-Groves	227	13.4	±0.0
Conservative	Nicholas Leech	189	11.1	–7.5
Liberal Democrats	Riad Mannan	92	5.4	–8.7
TUSC	Barbara Clare	16	0.9	–5.5
Majority		165	9.7	N/A
Turnout		1,699	35.2	+9.9
Registered electors		~4,827		
Reform gain from Labour Co-op				

=== St Nicholas ===
St Nicholas (2 seats due to by-election)
Party	Candidate	Votes	%	±%
Labour Co-op	Claire Parris*	716	36.0	–12.9
Reform	Matthew Hurst	666	33.4	N/A
Reform	Ian Marshall	616	30.9	N/A
Labour Co-op	Carolina Veres*	590	29.6	–19.3
Green	Jenn Arndt	371	18.6	+4.4
Green	Philip Notley	324	16.3	+2.1
Conservative	Jeremy Beadle	235	11.8	–7.1
Conservative	Jack Ingarfill	200	10.0	–8.9
Liberal Democrats	David Barks	150	7.5	–4.6
Liberal Democrats	Richard Reece	115	5.8	–6.3
Turnout		~1,992	38.8	+7.7
Registered electors		~5,134		
Labour Co-op hold				
Reform gain from Labour Co-op				

=== Symonds Green ===
Symonds Green
Party	Candidate	Votes	%	±%
Reform	Jeff Bullock	761	39.3	N/A
Labour	Jamie Pendlebury	392	20.2	–17.7
Green	Jack Downie-Webb	378	19.5	+2.6
Conservative	Maria Wheeler	264	13.6	–11.4
Liberal Democrats	Clive Heramon	131	6.8	–8.4
TUSC	Trevor Palmer	12	0.6	–4.3
Majority		369	19.1	N/A
Turnout		1,938	41.6	+9.4
Registered electors		~4,659		
Reform gain from Labour				

=== Woodfield ===
Woodfield
Party	Candidate	Votes	%	±%
Reform	Doug Bainbridge	633	31.9	+23.9
Conservative	Margaret Notley	511	25.8	–8.4
Labour Co-op	Ceara Roopchand*	443	22.3	–10.7
Green	Richard Warr	235	11.9	–0.5
Liberal Democrats	Emma Fielding	161	8.1	–4.3
Majority		122	6.1	N/A
Turnout		1,983	44.5	+6.3
Registered electors		~4,456		
Reform gain from Labour Co-op		Swing	▲16.2	
