= 1990 Stevenage Borough Council election =

1990 UK local government election

← 1988	3 May 1990	1991 →

13 of the 39 seats to Stevenage Borough Council 20 seats needed for a majority
	First party	Second party	Third party
Party	Labour	Liberal Democrats	Conservative
Seats before	27	10	1
Seats won	13	0	0
Seats after	32	6	1
Seat change	▲5	▼4	Steady
Popular vote	15,975	2,927	6,255
Percentage	61.5%	11.3%	24.1%
- Map showing the results of contested wards in the 1990 Stevenage Borough Council elections.
Council control before election
Labour
Council control after election
Labour

The 1990 Stevenage Borough Council election took place on 3 May 1990. This was on the same day as other local elections. One third of the council was up for election; the seats which were last contested in 1986. The Labour Party retained control of the council, which it had held continuously since its creation in 1973.

== Overall results ==
1990 Stevenage Borough Council Election
Party	Seats	Gains	Losses	Net gain/loss	Seats %	Votes %	Votes	+/−
Labour	13	4	0	▲5	100.0	61.5	15,975	▲11.6
Conservative	0	0	0	Steady	0.0	24.1	6,255	▼5.9
Liberal Democrats	0	0	4	▼4	0.0	11.3	2,927	▼23.4
Green	0	0	0	Steady	0.0	2.1	553	▲1.9
Independent Labour	0	0	0	Steady	0.0	1.0	270	New
Total	13						25,980	
Labour hold								

All comparisons in seats and vote share are to the corresponding 1986 election.

== Ward results ==
=== Bandley Hill ===
Location of Bandley Hill ward

Bandley Hill
Party	Candidate	Votes	%
Labour	A. Luhman	1,880	77.3%
Conservative	F. Warner	552	22.7%
Turnout			40.3%
Labour hold			

=== Bedwell Plash ===
Location of Bedwell Plash ward

Bedwell Plash
Party	Candidate	Votes	%
Labour	W. Lawrence	1,390	77.2%
Conservative	S. Robinson	411	22.8%
Turnout			46.2%
Labour hold			

=== Chells ===
Location of Chells ward

Chells
Party	Candidate	Votes	%
Labour	P. Stuart	927	65.3%
Conservative	L. Bradshaw	268	18.9%
Liberal Democrats	G. Wren	225	15.8%
Turnout			45.2%
Labour hold			

=== Longmeadow ===
Location of Longmeadow ward

Longmeadow
Party	Candidate	Votes	%
Labour	P. Webb	1,361	53.2%
Liberal Democrats	R. Baskerville	519	20.3%
Conservative	J. Gordon	498	19.5%
Green	W. Hoyes	179	7.0%
Turnout			51.0%
Labour gain from Liberal Democrats			

=== Martins Wood ===
Location of Martins Wood ward

Martins Wood
Party	Candidate	Votes	%
Labour	S. Strange	1,218	47.9%
Conservative	I. Sills	713	28.0%
Liberal Democrats	K. Taylor	412	16.2%
Green	M. Fowler	200	7.9%
Turnout			48.0%
Labour gain from Liberal Democrats			

=== Mobbsbury ===
Location of Mobbsbury ward

Mobbsbury
Party	Candidate	Votes	%
Labour	G. O'Carroll	868	47.3%
Liberal Democrats	R. Parker	759	41.4%
Conservative	A. Ffinch	208	11.3%
Turnout			54.9%
Labour gain from Liberal Democrats			

=== Monkswood ===
Location of Monkswood ward

Monkswood
Party	Candidate	Votes	%
Labour	D. Cullen	901	80.0%
Conservative	M. Henry	225	20.0%
Turnout			46.2%
Labour hold			

=== Old Stevenage ===
Location of Old Stevenage ward

Old Stevenage
Party	Candidate	Votes	%
Labour	H. Tessier	1,314	49.2%
Conservative	J. Halling	958	35.9%
Liberal Democrats	D. Christy	399	14.9%
Turnout			50.3%
Labour hold			

=== Pin Green ===
Location of Pin Green ward

Pin Green
Party	Candidate	Votes	%
Labour	R. Smith	1,223	67.2%
Conservative	C. Aylin	422	23.2%
Green	R. Gurney	174	9.6%
Turnout			46.6%
Labour hold			

=== Roebuck ===
Location of Roebuck ward

Roebuck
Party	Candidate	Votes	%
Labour	B. Dunnel	1,176	59.4%
Conservative	P. McPartland	502	25.4%
Liberal Democrats	J. Lucioli	302	15.3%
Turnout			47.4%
Labour hold			

=== St Nicholas ===
Location of St Nicholas ward

St Nicholas
Party	Candidate	Votes	%
Labour	P. Alexander	940	59.0%
Conservative	T. Woods	341	21.4%
Liberal Democrats	A. Simister	311	19.5%
Turnout			42.3%
Labour gain from Liberal Democrats			

=== Shephall ===
Location of Shephall ward

Shephall
Party	Candidate	Votes	%
Labour	E. Webb	1,094	69.1%
Independent Labour	S. Greenfield	270	17.0%
Conservative	S. Huetson	220	13.9%
Turnout			46.3%
Labour hold			

=== Symonds Green ===
Location of Symonds Green ward

Symonds Green
Party	Candidate	Votes	%
Labour	D. Kissane	1,683	64.2%
Conservative	M. Notley	937	35.8%
Turnout			49.1%
Labour hold			
