= 2024 Stevenage Borough Council election =

2024 local government election in North Hertfordshire

← 2023	2 May 2024	2026 →

All 39 seats to Stevenage Borough Council 20 seats needed for a majority

	First party	Second party	Third party
Leader	Richard Henry	Robin Parker	Phil Bibby
Party	Labour	Liberal Democrats	Conservative
Leader's seat	St Nicholas	Manor	Woodfield
Last election	24 seats, 44.1%	6 seats, 19.5%	9 seats, 28.8%
Seats before	24	6	9
Seats won	32	6	1
Seat change	▲8	Steady	▼8
Popular vote	26,842	8,862	9,949
Percentage	51.8%	17.1%	19.2%
Swing	▲7.7%	▼1.7%	▼9.6%
- Winner of each seat at the 2024 Stevenage Borough Council election
Leader before election
Richard Henry
Labour Co-op
Leader after election
Richard Henry
Labour Co-op

The 2024 Stevenage Borough Council election was held on Thursday 2 May 2024, alongside the other local elections in the United Kingdom being held on the same day. All 39 members of Stevenage Borough Council in Hertfordshire were elected following boundary changes.

The election saw the Conservatives nearly wiped out of the council entirely, with them only holding onto one seat in Woodfield. All of their other seats went to the Labour Party. The Liberal Democrats held on to all their seats, becoming the official opposition in Stevenage. No other party made any notable impact or gains in the results.

Woodfield ward saw the rare outcome where two candidates drew on the number of received votes. Labour candidate Robert Boyle and incumbent Conservative councillor Margaret Notley both received 571 votes and had to draw lots to determine who won, with Robert winning.

== Summary ==
=== Election result ===
Stevenage Borough Council's composition after the 2024 local elections

2024 Stevenage Borough Council election
Party	Candidates	Seats	Gains	Losses	Net gain/loss	Seats %	Votes %	Votes	+/−
Labour	39	32	7	0	▲8	82.0	51.8	26,842	+7.7
Liberal Democrats	20	6	0	0	Steady	15.4	17.1	8,862	-1.7
Conservative	21	1	0	7	▼8	2.6	19.2	9,949	-9.6
Green	14	0	0	0	Steady	0.0	7.6	3,924	+2.5
Reform	7	0	0	0	Steady	0.0	2.8	1,479	+2.5
TUSC	9	0	0	0	Steady	0.0	1.5	770	-0.3

== Ward results ==
The Statement of Persons Nominated, which details the candidates standing in each ward, was released by Stevenage Borough Council following the close of nominations on 8 April 2024. The results were published by the council the day after the election.

=== Almond Hill ===
Almond Hill (3 seats)
Party	Candidate	Votes	%	±%
Labour Co-op	Lin Martin-Haugh*	834	52.7	
Labour Co-op	Tom Plater	814	51.5	
Labour Co-op	Jeannette Thomas*	783	49.5	
Conservative	Nicolaas Houps	469	29.6	
Green	Paul Dawson	447	28.3	
Liberal Democrats	Richard Phillip Reece	356	22.5	
Turnout		1,582	29.14	
Registered electors		5,460		
Labour Co-op win (new seat)				
Labour Co-op win (new seat)				
Labour Co-op win (new seat)				

=== Bandley Hill & Poplars ===
Bandley Hill & Poplars (3 seats)
Party	Candidate	Votes	%	±%
Labour Co-op	Jim Brown*	749	42.0	
Labour Co-op	Jade Woods	701	39.3	
Labour Co-op	Kamal Choudhury	689	38.7	
Conservative	David Denny-Stubbs	530	29.7	
Conservative	Victoria Facey	508	28.5	
Conservative	Matthew Wyatt	462	25.9	
Liberal Democrats	Charles Littleton	271	15.2	
Reform	Michael Hearn	266	14.9	
Liberal Democrats	Peter Wilkins	252	14.1	
Liberal Democrats	Riad Mannan	218	12.2	
Green	Adrian Busolini	183	10.3	
TUSC	Mark Pickersgill	62	3.5	
Turnout		1,782	32.49	
Registered electors		5,501		
Labour Co-op win (new seat)				
Labour Co-op win (new seat)				
Labour Co-op win (new seat)				

=== Bedwell ===
Bedwell (3 seats)
Party	Candidate	Votes	%	±%
Labour Co-op	Conor McGrath*	887	59.9	
Labour Co-op	Nazmin Chowdhury*	830	56.0	
Labour Co-op	Ellie Plater*	786	53.1	
Conservative	Cathy Bibby	367	24.8	
Liberal Democrats	Christopher Berry	296	20.0	
Green	Steven Hodges	282	19.0	
TUSC	Steve Glennon	109	7.4	
Turnout		1,481	27.30	
Registered electors		5,451		
Labour Co-op hold				
Labour Co-op hold				
Labour Co-op hold				

=== Chells ===
Chells (3 seats)
Party	Candidate	Votes	%	±%
Liberal Democrats	Julie Ashley-Wren*	741	47.3	
Liberal Democrats	Tom Wren*	738	47.2	
Liberal Democrats	Stephen Booth*	598	38.2	
Labour	John Lloyd	509	32.5	
Labour	Patrick Newman	460	29.4	
Labour	Thea Pendlebury	448	28.6	
Conservative	Christine Clarkson	290	18.5	
Green	David Ingarfill	212	13.5	
Turnout		1,565	28.47	
Registered electors		5,518		
Liberal Democrats hold				
Liberal Democrats hold				
Liberal Democrats hold				

=== Longmeadow ===
Longmeadow (3 seats)
Party	Candidate	Votes	%	±%
Labour Co-op	Peter Clark	700	39.0	
Labour Co-op	Lynda Guy	663	36.9	
Labour Co-op	Akin Elekolusi	593	33.0	
Conservative	Alex Farquharson*	590	32.9	
Conservative	Adam Mitchell*	571	31.8	
Conservative	Bret Facey*	568	31.6	
Green	Jim Borcherds	491	27.3	
Reform	Matthew Hurst	193	10.7	
Reform	Doug Bainbridge	191	10.6	
Liberal Democrats	Matthew Snell	180	10.0	
Reform	Philip Durling	164	9.1	
TUSC	Helen Kerr	48	2.7	
Turnout		1,796	36.78	
Registered electors		4,891		
Labour Co-op gain from Conservative				
Labour Co-op gain from Conservative				
Labour Co-op gain from Conservative				

=== Manor ===
Manor
Party	Candidate	Votes	%	±%
Liberal Democrats	Robin Parker*	1,122	61.8	
Liberal Democrats	Andy McGuinness*	1,077	59.3	
Liberal Democrats	Graham Snell*	1,023	56.3	
Labour	Louisa Barr	397	21.8	
Labour	Maureen McKay*	357	19.6	
Labour	Peter Taylor	328	18.1	
Conservative	Andy Goldsmith	311	17.1	
Green	Ashlee Hodson	189	10.4	
Turnout		1,817	33.26	
Registered electors		5,487		
Liberal Democrats hold				
Liberal Democrats hold				
Liberal Democrats hold				

=== Martins Wood ===
Martins Wood (3 seats)
Party	Candidate	Votes	%	±%
Labour Co-op	Myla Arceno*	798	51.0	
Labour Co-op	Lloyd Briscoe*	751	48.0	
Labour Co-op	Carolina Veres*	717	45.8	
Conservative	Andy Facey	421	26.9	
Reform	Janet Bainbridge	267	17.1	
Reform	Robert Henry	252	16.1	
Green	Chris Hodson	238	15.2	
Liberal Democrats	Anthony Segadelli	228	14.6	
Green	Naomi Lovelace-Collins	203	13.0	
TUSC	Mark Gentleman	61	3.9	
Turnout		1,564	30.88	
Registered electors		5,077		
Labour Co-op hold				
Labour Co-op hold				
Labour Co-op hold				

=== Old Town ===
Old Town (3 seats)
Party	Candidate	Votes	%	±%
Labour Co-op	Coleen Houlihan	733	49.6	
Labour Co-op	Nigel Williams	665	45.0	
Labour Co-op	Mason Humberstone*	661	44.7	
Conservative	Harry Curtis	523	35.4	
Conservative	Maria Wheeler	504	34.1	
Conservative	Rambhai Malavia	433	29.3	
Green	Andy Whitmore	301	20.4	
Liberal Democrats	Andrew Anderson	226	15.3	
TUSC	Mark Kerr	69	4.7	
Turnout		1,479	35.70	
Registered electors		4,179		
Labour Co-op hold				
Labour Co-op hold				
Labour Co-op gain from Conservative				

=== Roebuck ===
Roebuck (3 seats)
Party	Candidate	Votes	%	±%
Labour Co-op	Anne Wells*	727	52.9	
Labour Co-op	Forhad Chowdhury*	701	51.1	
Labour Co-op	Alistair Gordon	701	51.1	
Conservative	Nick Leech	433	31.5	
Liberal Democrats	Nigel Bye	310	22.6	
Green	Pawel Gora	286	20.8	
TUSC	Bryan Clare	92	6.7	
Turnout		1,373	27.48	
Registered electors		5,040		
Labour Co-op hold				
Labour Co-op hold				
Labour Co-op gain from Conservative				

=== Shephall ===
Shephall (3 seats)
Party	Candidate	Votes	%	±%
Labour Co-op	Rob Broom*	737	60.8	
Labour Co-op	Sarah Mead*	733	60.4	
Labour Co-op	Simon Speller*	665	54.8	
Conservative	Celia Lawrence	289	23.8	
Liberal Democrats	David Barks	219	18.1	
Green	Stephani Mok	209	17.2	
TUSC	Barbara Clare	100	8.2	
Turnout		1,213	25.30	
Registered electors		4,841		
Labour Co-op hold				
Labour Co-op hold				
Labour Co-op hold				

=== St. Nicholas ===
St. Nicholas (3 seats)
Party	Candidate	Votes	%	±%
Labour Co-op	Sandra Barr*	1,052	62.7	
Labour Co-op	Richard Henry*	962	57.3	
Labour Co-op	Claire Parris*	938	55.9	
Conservative	Mel Mitchell	407	24.3	
Green	Chris Keane	305	18.2	
Liberal Democrats	Hazel Jones	260	15.5	
TUSC	Amber Gentleman	128	7.6	
Turnout		1,678	31.07	
Registered electors		5,433		
Labour Co-op hold				
Labour Co-op hold				
Labour Co-op hold				

=== Symonds Green ===
Symonds Green (3 seats)
Party	Candidate	Votes	%	±%
Labour Co-op	Jackie Hollywell*	787	53.4	
Labour Co-op	Loraine Rossati*	666	45.2	
Labour Co-op	Ceara Roopchand	627	42.6	
Conservative	Jack Ingarfill	519	35.2	
Green	Becca Watts	351	23.8	
Liberal Democrats	Clive Hearmon	316	21.5	
TUSC	Trevor Palmer	101	6.9	
Turnout		1,473	32.16	
Registered electors		4,608		
Labour Co-op hold				
Labour Co-op hold				
Labour Co-op hold				

=== Woodfield ===
Woodfield (3 seats)
Party	Candidate	Votes	%	±%
Conservative	Phil Bibby*	624	40.7	
Labour	Leanne Brady	602	39.2	
Labour	Robert Boyle	571 (Note: Robert Boyle and Margaret Notley received the same number of votes, so the one elected was decided via drawing lots.)	37.2	
Conservative	Margaret Notley*	571	37.2	
Conservative	Jody Hanafin	559	36.4	
Labour	Swantantra Tripathi	520	33.9	
Liberal Democrats	Jill Brinkworth	227	14.8	
Green	Richard Warr	227	14.8	
Liberal Democrats	Neil Brinkworth	204	13.3	
Reform	Amodio Amato	146	9.5	
Turnout		1,535	38.15	
Registered electors		4,037		
Conservative hold				
Labour gain from Conservative				
Labour gain from Conservative				

== Changes 2024-2026 ==
=== By-elections ===
==== Manor ====
Manor by-election: 13 February 2025
Party	Candidate	Votes	%	±%
Liberal Democrats	Peter Wilkins	760	55.6	±0.0
Reform	Matthew Hurst	320	23.4	N/A
Conservative	Marcel Houps	139	10.2	–5.2
Labour	Thea Pendlebury	101	7.4	–12.3
Green	Stephani Mok	46	3.4	–6.0
Majority		440	32.2	N/A
Turnout		1,366	25.2	–8.1
Liberal Democrats hold				

==== Bedwell ====
Bedwell by-election: 26 June 2025
Party	Candidate	Votes	%	±%
Labour	Dermot Kehoe	506	43.2	–2.5
Reform	John Duncan	404	34.5	N/A
Conservative	Marcel Houps	105	9.0	–9.9
Green	Stephani Mok	79	6.7	–7.8
Liberal Democrats	Jill Brinkworth	78	6.7	–8.5
Majority		102	8.7	N/A
Turnout		1,172	21.6	–5.7
Registered electors		5,429		
Labour hold				

==== Roebuck ====
Roebuck by-election: 30 October 2025
Party	Candidate	Votes	%	±%
Reform	Rob Henry	513	39.2	N/A
Labour	Thea Pendlebury	353	26.9	–12.4
Conservative	Pawel Gora	157	12.0	–11.4
Liberal Democrats	Nigel Bye	148	11.3	–5.5
Green	Glen Rozemont	139	10.6	–4.9
Majority		160	12.3	N/A
Turnout		1,310	25.8	–1.7
Registered electors		5,075		
Reform gain from Labour				

== See also ==
- Stevenage Borough Council elections
