= 1992 Stevenage Borough Council election =

1992 UK local government election

← 1991	7 May 1992	1994 →

13 of the 39 seats to Stevenage Borough Council 20 seats needed for a majority
	First party	Second party
Party	Labour	Conservative
Seats before	35	1
Seats won	10	3
Seats after	32	4
Seat change	▼3	▲3
Popular vote	9,838	7,584
Percentage	47.3%	36.5%
	Third party	Fourth party
Party	Liberal	Liberal Democrats
Seats before	2	1
Seats won	0	0
Seats after	2	1
Seat change	Steady	Steady
Popular vote	Did not stand	3,356
Percentage	N/A	16.2%
- Map showing the results of contested wards in the 1992 Stevenage Borough Council elections.
Council control before election
Labour
Council control after election
Labour

The 1992 Stevenage Borough Council election took place on 7 May 1992. This was on the same day as other local elections. One third of the council was up for election; the seats which were last contested in 1988. The Labour Party retained control of the council, which it had held continuously since its creation in 1973.

== Overall results ==
1992 Stevenage Borough Council Election
Party	Seats	Gains	Losses	Net gain/loss	Seats %	Votes %	Votes	+/−
Labour	10	0	3	▼3		47.3	9,838	▼7.6
Conservative	3	3	0	▲3		36.5	7,584	▲10.5
Liberal Democrats	0	0	0	Steady		16.2	3,356	▲2.5
Total	13						20,778	
Labour hold								

All comparisons in seats and vote share are to the corresponding 1988 election.

== Ward results ==
=== Bandley Hill ===
Location of Bandley Hill

Bandley Hill
Party	Candidate	Votes	%
Labour	R. Woodward	1,037	56.2%
Conservative	F. Warner	609	33.0%
Liberal Democrats	F. Price	200	10.8%
Turnout			30.2%
Labour hold			

=== Bedwell Plash ===
Location of Bedwell Plash ward

Bedwell Plash
Party	Candidate	Votes	%
Labour	M. Downing	860	60.5%
Conservative	P. Gonzalez	461	32.4%
Liberal Democrats	P. Windred	100	7.0%
Turnout			36.4%
Labour hold			

=== Chells ===
Location of Chells ward

Chells
Party	Candidate	Votes	%
Labour	K. Vale	599	48.9%
Conservative	G. Hegan	388	31.7%
Liberal Democrats	J. Wren	237	19.4%
Turnout			37.8%
Labour hold			

=== Longmeadow ===
Location of Longmeadow ward

Longmeadow
Party	Candidate	Votes	%
Labour	B. Jackson	750	36.8%
Liberal Democrats	P. Akhurst	725	35.5%
Conservative	M. Hurst	565	27.7%
Turnout			41.2%
Labour hold			

=== Martins Wood ===
Location of Martins Wood ward

Martins Wood
Party	Candidate	Votes	%
Conservative	D. Hawkins	1,272	52.0%
Labour	G. Marshall	933	38.2%
Liberal Democrats	K. Taylor	240	9.8%
Turnout			42.6%
Conservative gain from Labour			

=== Mobbsbury ===
Location of Mobbsbury ward

Mobbsbury
Party	Candidate	Votes	%
Labour	R. Davies	560	40.0%
Liberal Democrats	R. Aitkins	468	33.4%
Conservative	J. Whitaker	373	26.6%
Turnout			42.3%
Labour hold			

=== Monkswood ===
Location of Monkswood ward

Monkswood
Party	Candidate	Votes	%
Labour	E. Harrington	593	68.1%
Conservative	M. Shaw	187	21.5%
Liberal Democrats	G. Robbins	91	10.4%
Turnout			35.7%
Labour hold			

=== Old Stevenage ===
Location of Old Stevenage ward

Old Stevenage
Party	Candidate	Votes	%
Conservative	P. McPartland	1,243	53.7%
Labour	M. Charney-Craw	876	37.8%
Liberal Democrats	A. Christy	196	8.5%
Turnout			43.8%
Conservative gain from Labour			

=== Pin Green ===
Location of Pin Green ward

Pin Green
Party	Candidate	Votes	%
Labour	J. Macfadyen	766	55.6%
Conservative	A. Luck	438	31.8%
Liberal Democrats	S. Grubert	173	12.6%
Turnout			36.0%
Labour hold			

=== Roebuck ===
Location of Roebuck ward

Roebuck
Party	Candidate	Votes	%
Labour	F. Schofield	737	48.3%
Conservative	H. Poole	510	33.4%
Liberal Democrats	P. Atkinson	278	18.2%
Turnout			37.5%
Labour hold			

=== St Nicholas ===
Location of St Nicholas ward

St Nicholas
Party	Candidate	Votes	%
Labour	R. Fowler	521	43.8%
Conservative	S. Woods	363	30.5%
Liberal Democrats	A. Simister	306	25.7%
Turnout			32.8%
Labour hold			

=== Shephall ===
Location of Shephall ward

Shephall
Party	Candidate	Votes	%
Labour	R. Clark	687	68.4%
Conservative	S. Huetson	230	22.9%
Liberal Democrats	A. Sharman	88	8.8%
Turnout			30.3%
Labour hold			

=== Symonds Green ===
Location of Symonds Green ward

Symonds Green
Party	Candidate	Votes	%
Conservative	M. Notley	945	44.6%
Labour	S. Munden	919	43.4%
Liberal Democrats	K. Sharman	254	12.0%
Turnout			39.2%
Conservative gain from Labour			
