= 1976 Stevenage Borough Council election =

1976 UK local government election

| ← 1973 | 6 May 1976 | 1979 → |

All 34 seats to Stevenage Borough Council 18 seats needed for a majority
| | First party | Second party |
|---|---|---|
| Party | Labour | Conservative |
| Seats before | 32 | 3 |
| Seats won | 28 | 6 |
| Seat change | ▼4 | ▲3 |
| Popular vote | 9,309 | 8,540 |
| Percentage | 45.0% | 41.3% |
Council control before election
Labour
Council control after election
Labour

The 1976 Stevenage Borough Council election took place on 6 May 1976. This was on the same day as other local elections. The entire council was up for election and the Labour Party retained control of the council.

== Overall results ==
1976 Stevenage Borough Council Election
| Party | Seats | Gains | Losses | Net gain/loss | Seats % | Votes % | Votes | +/− |
|---|---|---|---|---|---|---|---|---|
| Labour | 28 | 0 | 3 | ▼3 | 82.4 | 45.0 | 9,309 | ▼10.9 |
| Conservative | 6 | 3 | 0 | ▲3 | 17.6 | 41.3 | 8,540 | ▲15.8 |
| National Party | 0 | 0 | 0 | Steady | 0.0 | 7.5 | 1,544 | New |
| Liberal | 0 | 0 | 0 | Steady | 0.0 | 6.3 | 1,301 | ▼12.3 |
| Total | 34 | | | | | | 15,458 | |
| Labour hold | | | | | | | | |

== Ward results ==
=== Bedwell (5 seats) ===
Bedwell (5 seats)
| Party | Candidate | Votes | % |
|---|---|---|---|
| Labour | H. Lawrence | 1,222 | |
| Labour | L. Cummins | 1,219 | |
| Labour | K. Hopkins | 1,179 | |
| Labour | R. Fowler | 1,176 | |
| Labour | A. Wiltshire | 1,153 | |
| Conservative | A. Flanagan | 1,109 | |
| Conservative | M. Henry | 1,102 | |
| Conservative | D. Chapman | 1,088 | |
| Conservative | H. Silberstein | 1,063 | |
| Conservative | S. Sinfield | 1,033 | |
| National Party | L. Dolby | 213 | |
| Turnout | | | 44.2% |
| Labour hold | | | |
| Labour hold | | | |
| Labour hold | | | |
| Labour hold | | | |
| Labour hold | | | |

=== Broadwater (5 seats) ===
Broadwater (5 seats)
| Party | Candidate | Votes | % |
|---|---|---|---|
| Labour | J. Cockerton | 1,379 | |
| Labour | W. Lawrence | 1,243 | |
| Labour | S. Munden | 1,231 | |
| Labour | J. Tye | 1,185 | |
| Labour | N. Wilson | 1,175 | |
| Conservative | D. Hawkins | 1,123 | |
| Conservative | J. Hawkins | 1,117 | |
| Conservative | C. Brett | 1,087 | |
| Conservative | M. Stannard | 1,034 | |
| Conservative | B. Portsmouth | 1,010 | |
| Liberal | E. Brook | 504 | |
| Liberal | M. Dawson | 446 | |
| Liberal | M. Boutell | 446 | |
| Liberal | P. Selley | 421 | |
| Liberal | T. Smallwood | 387 | |
| Turnout | | | 45.4% |
| Labour hold | | | |
| Labour hold | | | |
| Labour hold | | | |
| Labour hold | | | |
| Labour hold | | | |

=== Chells (5 seats) ===
Chells (5 seats)
| Party | Candidate | Votes | % |
|---|---|---|---|
| Labour | J. Clarke | 1,369 | |
| Labour | P. Metcalfe | 1,340 | |
| Labour | M. Cotter | 1,334 | |
| Labour | K. Vale | 1,252 | |
| Labour | L. Robbins | 1,220 | |
| Conservative | B. Davis | 1,012 | |
| Conservative | A. Mann | 956 | |
| Conservative | R. House | 952 | |
| Conservative | J. Moore | 940 | |
| Conservative | H. O'Shaughnessy | 922 | |
| National Party | L. Barnes | 290 | |
| Turnout | | | 41.1% |
| Labour hold | | | |
| Labour hold | | | |
| Labour hold | | | |
| Labour hold | | | |
| Labour hold | | | |

=== Old Stevenage (5 seats) ===
Old Stevenage (5 seats)
| Party | Candidate | Votes | % |
|---|---|---|---|
| Conservative | J. Boyd | 2,233 | |
| Conservative | A. Lines | 2,221 | |
| Conservative | W. Boyd | 2,174 | |
| Conservative | K. Stutley | 2,007 | |
| Conservative | M. Thomson | 1,940 | |
| Labour | H. Morris | 1,583 | |
| Labour | B. Shea | 1,324 | |
| Labour | G. Balderstone | 1,321 | |
| Labour | F. Schofield | 1,246 | |
| Labour | D. Rice | 1,184 | |
| National Party | H. Beeton | 245 | |
| Turnout | | | 46.9% |
| Conservative hold | | | |
| Conservative hold | | | |
| Conservative hold | | | |
| Conservative gain from Labour | | | |
| Conservative gain from Labour | | | |

=== Pin Green (8 seats) ===
Pin Green (8 seats)
| Party | Candidate | Votes | % |
|---|---|---|---|
| Labour | G. Colston | 2,145 | |
| Labour | A. Corner | 2,139 | |
| Labour | R. Clark | 2,105 | |
| Labour | B. Beasley | 2,089 | |
| Labour | A. Campbell | 2,085 | |
| Labour | E. Musgrove | 2,081 | |
| Labour | R. Smith | 1,997 | |
| Conservative | B. Goble | 1,965 | |
| Labour | K. Taylor | 1,918 | |
| Conservative | P. Hodges | 1,875 | |
| Conservative | K. McKechnie | 1,874 | |
| Conservative | W. Orsborne | 1,855 | |
| Conservative | N. Nunney | 1,814 | |
| Conservative | B. Shorten | 1,770 | |
| Conservative | T. O'Connor | 1,728 | |
| Conservative | S. Woods | 1,673 | |
| Liberal | K. Taylor | 797 | |
| Liberal | C. Hargreaves | 765 | |
| Liberal | R. Palmer | 762 | |
| Liberal | I. Hargreaves | 745 | |
| Liberal | S. Booth | 716 | |
| Liberal | G. Robbins | 639 | |
| Liberal | D. Steggalls | 638 | |
| Liberal | P. Roberts | 629 | |
| National Party | M. Powell | 358 | |
| National Party | S. Buzer | 316 | |
| Turnout | | | 40.8% |
| Labour hold | | | |
| Labour hold | | | |
| Labour hold | | | |
| Labour hold | | | |
| Labour hold | | | |
| Labour hold | | | |
| Labour hold | | | |
| Conservative gain from Labour | | | |

=== Shephall (6 seats) ===
Shephall (6 seats)
| Party | Candidate | Votes | % |
|---|---|---|---|
| Labour | B. Hall | 1,611 | |
| Labour | I. Johnson | 1,604 | |
| Labour | J. Pickersgill | 1,592 | |
| Labour | J. Lloyd | 1,562 | |
| Labour | F. Millard | 1,543 | |
| Labour | A. Luhman | 1,526 | |
| Conservative | J. Cannin | 1,098 | |
| Conservative | R. Oliver | 1,030 | |
| Conservative | P. Farrington | 1,026 | |
| Conservative | J. Andrews | 1,020 | |
| Conservative | H. Gladwin | 996 | |
| Conservative | C. Hicks | 971 | |
| National Party | J. Hawkins | 257 | |
| Turnout | | | 37.2% |
| Labour hold | | | |
| Labour hold | | | |
| Labour hold | | | |
| Labour hold | | | |
| Labour hold | | | |
| Labour hold | | | |
