= 1988 Stevenage Borough Council election =

1988 UK local government election

← 1987	5 May 1988	1990 →

13 of the 39 seats to Stevenage Borough Council 20 seats needed for a majority
	First party	Second party	Third party
Party	Labour	SLD	Conservative
Last election	26	12	1
Seats before	25	12	1
Seats won	13	0	0
Seats after	27	10	1
Seat change	▲2	▼2	Steady
Popular vote	12,845	4,390	6,084
Percentage	54.9%	18.7%	26.0%
- Map showing the results of contested wards in the 1988 Stevenage Borough Council elections.
Council control before election
Labour
Council control after election
Labour

The 1988 Stevenage Borough Council election took place on 5 May 1988. This was on the same day as other local elections. One third of the council was up for election; the seats which were last contested in 1984. The Labour Party retained control of the council, which it had held continuously since its creation in 1973.

== Overall results ==
1988 Stevenage Borough Council Election
Party	Seats	Gains	Losses	Net gain/loss	Seats %	Votes %	Votes	+/−
Labour	13	2	0	▲2	100.0	54.9	12,845	▲7.1
Conservative	0	0	0	Steady	0.0	26.0	6,084	▼2.1
SLD	0	0	2	▼2	0.0	18.7	4,390	▼5.4
Green	0	0	0	Steady	0.0	0.4	95	New
Total	13						23,414	
Labour hold								

All comparisons in seats and vote share are to the corresponding 1984 election.

== Ward results ==
=== Bandley Hill ===
Location of Bandley Hill

Bandley Hill
Party	Candidate	Votes	%
Labour	D. Woodward	1,504	69.3%
Conservative	F. Warner	410	18.9%
SLD	D. Cleary	255	11.8%
Turnout			36.3%
Labour hold			

=== Bedwell Plash ===
Location of Bedwell Plash ward

Bedwell Plash
Party	Candidate	Votes	%
Labour	M. Downing	1,166	69.2%
Conservative	M. Mowe	389	23.1%
SLD	J. Wren	131	7.8%
Turnout			42.8%
Labour hold			

=== Chells ===
Location of Chells ward

Chells
Party	Candidate	Votes	%
Labour	K. Vale	769	66.9%
Conservative	A. Ffinch	249	21.7%
SLD	Horne J.	132	11.5%
Turnout			35.8%
Labour hold			

=== Longmeadow ===
Location of Longmeadow ward

Longmeadow
Party	Candidate	Votes	%
Labour	P. Davies	1,034	42.5%
SLD	D. Millbrow	749	30.8%
Conservative	L. Irons	648	26.7%
Turnout			48.0%
Labour gain from SLD			

=== Martins Wood ===
Location of Martins Wood ward

Martins Wood
Party	Candidate	Votes	%
Labour	G. Marshall	834	40.6%
Conservative	J. Devey	623	30.3%
SLD	Herbert P.	503	24.5%
Green	M. Fowler	95	4.6%
Turnout			43.4%
Labour hold			

=== Mobbsbury ===
Location of Mobbsbury ward

Mobbsbury
Party	Candidate	Votes	%
Labour	R. Davies	753	46.3%
SLD	C. Lewis	626	38.5%
Conservative	G. Smith	247	15.2%
Turnout			46.8 %
Labour gain from SLD			

=== Monkswood ===
Location of Monkswood ward

Monkswood
Party	Candidate	Votes	%
Labour	B. Jackson	763	73.4%
Conservative	S. Huetson	183	17.6%
SLD	P. Younger	93	9.0%
Turnout			42.5%
Labour hold			

=== Old Stevenage ===
Location of Old Stevenage ward

Old Stevenage
Party	Candidate	Votes	%
Labour	H. Morris	1,158	47.6%
Conservative	F. Haine	1,044	42.9%
SLD	A. Christy	230	9.5%
Turnout			46.2%
Labour hold			

=== Pin Green ===
Location of Pin Green ward

Pin Green
Party	Candidate	Votes	%
Labour	A. Campbell	1,001	61.9%
Conservative	M. Allen	436	26.9%
SLD	V. Kelleher	181	11.2%
Turnout			41.5%
Labour hold			

=== Roebuck ===
Location of Roebuck ward

Roebuck
Party	Candidate	Votes	%
Labour	F. Schofield	979	48.3%
SLD	T. Allen	547	27.0%
Conservative	P. McPartland	501	24.7%
Turnout			48.2%
Labour hold			

=== St Nicholas ===
Location of St Nicholas ward

St Nicholas
Party	Candidate	Votes	%
Labour	R. Fowler	742	46.5%
SLD	J. Lucioli	528	33.1%
Conservative	S. Woods	325	20.4%
Turnout			41.9%
Labour hold			

=== Shephall ===
Location of Shephall ward

Shephall
Party	Candidate	Votes	%
Labour	R. Clark	935	70.0%
Conservative	D. Mynott	273	20.4%
SLD	A. Simister	127	9.5%
Turnout			38.4%
Labour hold			

=== Symonds Green ===
Location of Symonds Green ward

Symonds Green
Party	Candidate	Votes	%
Labour	S. Munden	1,207	53.6%
Conservative	M. Notley	756	33.6%
SLD	G. Balderstone	288	12.8%
Turnout			42.3%
Labour hold			
