= 1980 Stevenage Borough Council election =

1980 UK local government election

← 1979	1 May 1980	1982 →

13 of the 39 seats to Stevenage Borough Council 20 seats needed for a majority
	First party	Second party
Party	Labour	Conservative
Seats before	35	4
Seats won	13	0
Seats after	36	3
Seat change	▲1	▼1
Popular vote	12,484	5,725
Percentage	60.8%	27.9%
- Map showing the results of contested wards in the 1980 Stevenage Borough Council elections.
Council control before election
Labour
Council control after election
Labour

The 1980 Stevenage Borough Council election took place on 1 May 1980. This was on the same day as other local elections. One third of the council was up for election and the Labour Party retained control of the council, which it had held continuously since its creation in 1973.

== Overall results ==
1980 Stevenage Borough Council Election
Party	Seats	Gains	Losses	Net gain/loss	Seats %	Votes %	Votes	+/−
Labour	13	1	0	▲1	100.0	60.8	12,484	
Conservative	0	0	1	▼1	0.0	27.9	5,725	
Liberal	0	0	0	Steady	0.0	11.3	2,314	
Total	13						20,523	
Labour hold								

== Ward results ==
=== Bandley Hill ===
Location of Bandley Hill

Bandley Hill
Party	Candidate	Votes	%
Labour	R. Woodward	1,244	72.4%
Conservative	L. Jordan	344	20.0%
Liberal	M. Reynolds	131	7.6%
Turnout			38.3%
Labour hold			

=== Bedwell Plash ===
Location of Bedwell Plash ward

Bedwell Plash
Party	Candidate	Votes	%
Labour	D. Cullen	1,239	67.5%
Conservative	C. Aylin	464	25.3%
Liberal	R. Edwards	133	7.2%
Turnout			43.4%
Labour hold			

=== Chells ===
Location of Chells ward

Chells
Party	Candidate	Votes	%
Labour	K. Vale	976	71.7%
Conservative	P. Howard-Tripp	277	20.3%
Liberal	J. Meacham	109	8.0%
Turnout			39.8%
Labour hold			

=== Longmeadow ===
Location of Longmeadow ward

Longmeadow
Party	Candidate	Votes	%
Labour	F. Schofield	875	51.5%
Conservative	H. Gladwin	539	31.7%
Liberal	E. Brook	284	16.7%
Turnout			36.5%
Labour hold			

=== Martins Wood ===
Location of Martins Wood ward

Martins Wood
Party	Candidate	Votes	%
Labour	K. Wilkinson	919	57.6%
Conservative	A. Hurst	459	28.8%
Liberal	S. Booth	217	13.6%
Turnout			40.5%
Labour hold			

=== Mobbsbury ===
Location of Mobbsbury ward

Mobbsbury
Party	Candidate	Votes	%
Labour	J. Turnock	928	62.1%
Conservative	K. Clewer	412	27.6%
Liberal	I. Hargreaves	154	10.3%
Turnout			43.0%
Labour hold			

=== Monkswood ===
Location of Monkswood ward

Monkswood
Party	Candidate	Votes	%
Labour	B. Dunnel	633	57.4%
Conservative	A. Mann	333	30.2%
Liberal	G. Robbins	137	12.4%
Turnout			41.7%
Labour gain from Conservative			

=== Old Stevenage ===
Location of Old Stevenage ward

Old Stevenage
Party	Candidate	Votes	%
Labour	H. Morris	1,135	50.3%
Conservative	D. Eaton	894	39.6%
Liberal	S. Booth	228	10.1%
Turnout			45.3%
Labour hold			

=== Pin Green ===
Location of Pin Green ward

Pin Green
Party	Candidate	Votes	%
Labour	A. Campbell	972	60.1%
Conservative	M. Russell	466	28.8%
Liberal	L. Atkins	179	11.1%
Turnout			41.8%
Labour hold			

=== Roebuck ===
Location of Roebuck ward

Roebuck
Party	Candidate	Votes	%
Labour	S. Munden	861	57.1%
Conservative	H. Grant	516	34.2%
Liberal	P. Selley	130	8.6%
Turnout			39.5%
Labour hold			

=== St Nicholas ===
Location of St Nicholas ward

St Nicholas
Party	Candidate	Votes	%
Labour	R. Fowler	857	58.0%
Conservative	S. Woods	388	26.3%
Liberal	C. Cuthbert	232	15.7%
Turnout			39.0%
Labour hold			

=== Shephall ===
Location of Shephall ward

Shephall
Party	Candidate	Votes	%
Labour	I. Johnson	879	71.5%
Conservative	T. Byrne	241	19.6%
Liberal	G. Reynolds	110	8.9%
Turnout			51.9%
Labour hold			

=== Symonds Green ===
Location of Symonds Green ward

Symonds Green
Party	Candidate	Votes	%
Labour	L. Robbins	966	59.3%
Conservative	G. Hook	548	33.7%
Liberal	L. Peal	114	7.0%
Turnout			35.1%
Labour hold			
