= 2022 Stevenage Borough Council election =

2022 UK local government election

- 5 May 2022

13 of the 39 seats to Stevenage Borough Council 20 seats needed for a majority

	First party	Second party	Third party
Party	Labour	Conservative	Liberal Democrats
Seats before	23	10	6
Seats won	9	2	2
Seats after	24	9	6
Seat change	▲1	▼1	Steady
Popular vote	9,718	6,778	3,968
Percentage	44.7%	31.2%	18.3%
Swing	▲7.0%	▼8.6%	▲2.5%
Leader before election
Sharon Taylor
Labour
Leader after election
Sharon Taylor
Labour

Elections to Stevenage Borough Council took place on 5 May 2022. This was on the same day as other local elections across the United Kingdom. One third of the council was up for election; the seats which were last contested in 2018. The Labour Party retained control of the council, which it has held continuously since its creation in 1973.

== Results summary ==
2022 Stevenage Borough Council election
Party	This election				Full council			This election		
Party	Candidates	Seats	Net	Seats %	Other	Total	Total %	Votes	Votes %	+/−
Labour	{{{candidates}}}	9	▲3	69.2	15	24	61.5	9,718	44.7	+7.0
Conservative	{{{candidates}}}	2	▼2	15.4	7	9	23.1	6,778	31.2	-8.6
Liberal Democrats	{{{candidates}}}	2	Steady	15.4	4	6	15.4	3,968	18.3	+2.5
Green	{{{candidates}}}	0	Steady	0.0	0	0	0.0	629	2.9	-0.5
TUSC	{{{candidates}}}	0	Steady	0.0	0	0	0.0	411	1.9	+0.6
Independent	{{{candidates}}}	0	▼1	0.0	0	0	0.0	178	0.8	-0.6
Reform	{{{candidates}}}	0	Steady	0.0	0	0	0.0	50	0.2	-0.1

== Ward results ==
=== Bandley Hill ===
Bandley Hill
Party	Candidate	Votes	%	±%
Labour Co-op	Joan Lloyd	786	47.7	+7.5
Conservative	Dhiren Malavia	589	35.7	−12.2
Liberal Democrats	Andrew Anderson	232	14.1	+4.4
TUSC	Barbara Clare	42	2.5	+0.2
Majority		197	12.0	
Turnout		1,649		
Labour Co-op hold		Swing	▲9.9	

=== Bedwell ===
Bedwell
Party	Candidate	Votes	%	±%
Labour Co-op	Nazmin Chowdhury	941	56.8	+2.6
Conservative	Catherine Bibby	452	27.3	−5.7
Liberal Democrats	Chris Berry	191	11.5	+1.8
TUSC	Steve Glennon	73	4.4	+1.4
Majority		489	29.5	
Turnout		1,657		
Labour Co-op hold		Swing	▲4.2	

=== Chells ===
Chells
Party	Candidate	Votes	%	±%
Liberal Democrats	Tom Wren	748	45.7	+10.8
Labour Co-op	Forhad Chowdhury	507	31.0	+2.0
Conservative	Matthew Wyatt	330	20.2	−8.4
TUSC	Roger Charles	50	3.1	+1.2
Majority		241	14.7	
Turnout		1,635		
Liberal Democrats hold		Swing	▲4.4	

=== Longmeadow ===
Longmeadow
Party	Candidate	Votes	%	±%
Conservative	Bret Facey	610	39.9	−11.0
Labour Co-op	Alistair Gordon	594	38.9	+5.4
Independent	Matthew Hurst	178	11.6	N/A
Liberal Democrats	Matthew Snell	121	7.9	+2.2
TUSC	Helen Kerr	25	1.6	+0.1
Majority		16	1.0	
Turnout		1,528		
Conservative hold		Swing	▼8.2	

=== Manor ===
Manor
Party	Candidate	Votes	%	±%
Liberal Democrats	Andy McGuinness	1,218	63.0	+7.3
Labour Co-op	Louisa Barr	315	16.3	+0.2
Conservative	Victoria Facey	306	15.8	−7.8
Green	Dean Carpenter	93	4.8	+0.2
Majority		903	47.2	
Turnout		1,932		
Liberal Democrats hold		Swing	▲3.6	

=== Martins Wood ===
Martins Wood
Party	Candidate	Votes	%	±%
Labour Co-op	Lloyd Briscoe	659	43.6	+8.8
Conservative	Andy Goldsmith	380	25.1	−5.6
Liberal Democrats	Isabel Wilks	370	24.5	−5.9
Green	Jim Borcherds	104	6.9	N/A
Majority		279	18.5	
Turnout		1,513		
Labour Co-op hold		Swing	▲7.2	

=== Old Town ===
Old Town
Party	Candidate	Votes	%	±%
Labour Co-op	Jim Brown	1,107	46.8	+11.4
Conservative	Jody Hanafin	942	39.8	−0.3
Green	Elizabeth Sturges	189	8.0	+0.5
Liberal Democrats	Madani Mannan	111	4.7	+1.2
TUSC	Mark Kerr	17	0.7	N/A
Majority		165	7.0	
Turnout		2,366		
Labour Co-op gain from Conservative		Swing	▲5.9	

=== Pin Green ===
Pin Green
Party	Candidate	Votes	%	±%
Labour Co-op	Lin Martin-Haugh	749	49.0	+2.9
Conservative	Andy Facey	484	31.6	−8.2
Liberal Democrats	Charles Littleton	142	9.3	+2.4
Green	Naomi Lovelace-Collins	131	8.6	+1.4
TUSC	Mark Pickersgill	24	1.6	N/A
Majority		265	17.4	
Turnout		1,530		
Labour Co-op hold		Swing	▲5.6	

=== Roebuck ===
Roebuck
Party	Candidate	Votes	%	±%
Labour Co-op	Anne Wells	757	47.1	+11.1
Conservative	Nicholas Leech	628	39.1	−8.8
Liberal Democrats	Nigel Bye	183	11.4	−2.7
TUSC	Bryan Clare	39	2.4	+0.4
Majority		129	8.0	
Turnout		1,607		
Labour Co-op gain from Conservative		Swing	▲10.0	

=== Shephall ===
Shephall
Party	Candidate	Votes	%	±%
Labour Co-op	Rob Broom	834	59.7	+12.2
Conservative	Celia Lawrence	375	26.9	−15.6
Liberal Democrats	David Barks	134	9.6	+3.8
TUSC	Michael Malocco	53	3.8	−0.4
Majority		459	32.8	
Turnout		1,396		
Labour Co-op hold		Swing	▲13.9	

=== St. Nicholas ===
St. Nicholas
Party	Candidate	Votes	%	±%
Labour Co-op	Sandra Barr	1,079	59.8	+13.5
Conservative	Melanie Mitchell	485	26.9	−10.0
Liberal Democrats	Hazel Jones	180	10.0	+1.9
TUSC	Amber Gentleman	60	3.3	+1.1
Majority		594	32.9	
Turnout		1,804		
Labour Co-op hold		Swing	▲11.8	

=== Symonds Green ===
Symonds Green
Party	Candidate	Votes	%	±%
Labour Co-op	Sharon Taylor	902	53.7	+10.7
Conservative	Jack Ingarfill	523	31.1	−11.6
Liberal Democrats	Clive Hearmon	115	6.8	+0.4
Green	Richard Warr	112	6.7	−0.1
TUSC	Trevor Palmer	28	1.7	+0.5
Majority		379	22.3	
Turnout		1,680		
Labour Co-op hold		Swing	▲11.2	

=== Woodfield ===
Woodfield
Party	Candidate	Votes	%	±%
Conservative	Phil Bibby	674	47.0	−6.5
Labour Co-op	Jim Callaghan	488	34.0	+3.6
Liberal Democrats	Neil Brinkworth	223	15.5	+1.5
Reform	Amodio Amato	50	3.5	+1.3
Majority		186	10.1	
Turnout		1,435		
Conservative hold		Swing	▼5.1	

== By-elections ==
=== Bedwell ===
Bedwell: 19 January 2023
Party	Candidate	Votes	%	±%
Labour	Conor McGrath	907	69.8	+13.0
Conservative	Matthew Wyatt	263	20.2	–15.5
Liberal Democrats	Chris Berry	129	10.0	–1.5
Majority		644	49.6	
Turnout				
Labour hold		Swing	▲14.25	
