= 1994 Stevenage Borough Council election =

1994 UK local government election

← 1992	5 May 1994	1995 →

14 of the 39 seats to Stevenage Borough Council 20 seats needed for a majority
	First party	Second party
Party	Labour	Conservative
Seats before	32	4
Seats won	13	0
Seats after	31	4
Seat change	▼1	Steady
Popular vote	13,749	4,744
Percentage	59.7%	20.6%
	Third party	Fourth party
Party	Liberal Democrats	Liberal
Seats before	1	2
Seats won	0	0
Seats after	2	2
Seat change	▲1	Steady
Popular vote	4,169	Did not stand
Percentage	18.1%	n/a
- Map showing the results of contested wards in the 1994 Stevenage Borough Council elections.
Council control before election
Labour
Council control after election
Labour

The 1994 Stevenage Borough Council election took place on 5 May 1994. This was on the same day as other local elections. One third of the council was up for election; the seats which were last contested in 1990. There was also a second seat up for election in Mobbsbury. The Labour Party retained control of the council, which it had held continuously since its creation in 1973.

== Overall results ==
1994 Stevenage Borough Council Election
Party	Seats	Gains	Losses	Net gain/loss	Seats %	Votes %	Votes	+/−
Labour	13	0		▼1	92.9	59.7	13,749	▼1.8
Conservative	0	0	0	Steady	0.0	20.6	4,744	▲3.5
Liberal Democrats	1	0	0	▲1	7.1	18.1	4,169	▲6.8
Militant Labour	0	0	0	Steady	0.0	0.8	179	▼0.2
Green	0	0	0	Steady	0.0	0.7	172	▼1.4
Total	13						23,013	
Labour hold								

All comparisons in seats and vote share are to the corresponding 1990 election.

== Ward results ==
=== Bandley Hill ===
Location of Bandley Hill ward

Bandley Hill
Party	Candidate	Votes	%
Labour	Peter L. Wardle	1,353	61.2%
Liberal Democrats	G. Walsh	364	16.5%
Conservative	F. Warner	315	14.2%
Militant Labour	J. Horton	179	8.1%
Turnout			36.9%
Labour hold			

=== Bedwell Plash ===
Location of Bedwell Plash ward

Bedwell Plash
Party	Candidate	Votes	%
Labour	Bill Lawrence	1,409	83.6%
Conservative	M. Wyatt	277	16.4%
Turnout			43.8%
Labour hold			

=== Chells ===
Location of Chells ward

Chells
Party	Candidate	Votes	%
Labour	Pamela Stuart	872	74.1%
Liberal Democrats	A. Tron	174	14.8%
Conservative	R. Luck	130	11.1%
Turnout			36.5%
Labour hold			

=== Longmeadow ===
Location of Longmeadow ward

Longmeadow
Party	Candidate	Votes	%
Labour	Ann Webb	1,258	53.2%
Conservative	M. Davies	573	24.2%
Liberal Democrats	G. Robbins	532	22.5%
Turnout			47.5%
Labour hold			

=== Martins Wood ===
Location of Martins Wood ward

Martins Wood
Party	Candidate	Votes	%
Labour	Gary Marshall	1,186	48.0%
Conservative	E. Fulton	850	34.4%
Liberal Democrats	B. Segadelli	434	17.6%
Turnout			39.8%
Labour hold			

=== Mobbsbury (2 seats) ===
Location of Mobbsbury ward

Mobbsbury
Party	Candidate	Votes	%
Labour	G. O'Carroll	736	
Liberal Democrats	A. Berkeley	734	
Liberal Democrats	M. Latham	732	
Labour	M. Pelling	702	
Conservative	G. Hegan	159	
Conservative	M. Shaw	133	
Turnout			55.2%
Labour hold			
Labour gain from Liberal Democrats			

=== Monkswood ===
Location of Monkswood ward

Monkswood
Party	Candidate	Votes	%
Labour	David Cullen	745	76.2%
Liberal Democrats	M. Harris	131	13.4%
Conservative	P. Gonzalez	102	10.4%
Turnout			41.7%
Labour hold			

=== Old Stevenage ===
Location of Old Stevenage ward

Old Stevenage
Party	Candidate	Votes	%
Labour	Hugh Tessier	1,250	51.4%
Conservative	C. Aylin	836	34.4%
Liberal Democrats	J. Moorcroft	345	14.2%
Turnout			44.0%
Labour hold			

=== Pin Green ===
Location of Pin Green ward

Pin Green
Party	Candidate	Votes	%
Labour	Rej J. Smith	934	61.0%
Conservative	E. Hegan	299	19.5%
Liberal Democrats	S. Grubert	297	19.4%
Turnout			40.5%
Labour hold			

=== Roebuck ===
Location of Roebuck ward

Roebuck
Party	Candidate	Votes	%
Labour	Brian Dunnell	964	57.6%
Conservative	A. Harvey	354	21.2%
Liberal Democrats	J. Samochwal	240	14.3%
Green	W. Hoyes	115	6.9%
Turnout			41.5%
Labour hold			

=== St Nicholas ===
Location of St Nicholas ward

St Nicholas
Party	Candidate	Votes	%
Labour	Stan R. Munden	634	44.3%
Liberal Democrats	M. Griffith	589	41.2%
Conservative	S. Woods	207	14.5%
Turnout			39.2%
Labour hold			

=== Shephall ===
Location of Shephall ward

Shephall
Party	Candidate	Votes	%
Labour	Eddie Webb	979	85.6%
Conservative	A. Luck	165	14.4%
Turnout			35.2%
Labour hold			

=== Symonds Green ===
Location of Symonds Green ward

Symonds Green
Party	Candidate	Votes	%
Labour	David Kissane	1,429	62.3%
Conservative	J. Jode	477	20.8%
Liberal Democrats	K. Taylor	329	14.4%
Green	T. Figg	57	2.5%
Turnout			42.7%
Labour hold			
