= 1984 Stevenage Borough Council election =

1984 UK local government election

- 3 May 1984

13 of the 39 seats to Stevenage Borough Council 20 seats needed for a majority
| | First party | Second party | Third party |
|---|---|---|---|
| Party | Labour | Alliance | Conservative |
| Seats before | 27 | 10 | 2 |
| Seats won | 11 | 2 | 0 |
| Seats after | 26 | 11 | 2 |
| Seat change | ▼1 | ▲1 | Steady |
| Popular vote | 11,138 | 6,545 | 5,618 |
| Percentage | 47.8% | 28.1% | 24.1% |
- Map showing the results of contested wards in the 1984 Stevenage Borough Council elections.
Council control before election
Labour
Council control after election
Labour

The 1984 Stevenage Borough Council election took place on 3 May 1984. This was on the same day as other local elections. One third of the council was up for election; the seats which were last contested in 1980. The Labour Party retained control of the council, which it had held continuously since its creation in 1973.

== Overall results ==
1984 Stevenage Borough Council Election
| Party | Seats | Gains | Losses | Net gain/loss | Seats % | Votes % | Votes | +/− |
|---|---|---|---|---|---|---|---|---|
| Labour | 11 | 0 | 1 | ▼1 | 84.6 | 47.8 | 11,138 | ▼13.0 |
| Alliance | 2 | 1 | 0 | ▲1 | 15.4 | 28.1 | 6,545 | ▲16.8 |
| Conservative | 0 | 0 | 0 | Steady | 0.0 | 24.1 | 5,618 | ▼3.8 |
| Total | 13 | | | | | | 20,523 | |
| Labour hold | | | | | | | | |

All comparisons in vote share are to the corresponding 1980 election.

== Ward results ==
=== Bandley Hill ===
Location of Bandley Hill

Bandley Hill
| Party | Candidate | Votes | % |
|---|---|---|---|
| Labour | Woodward | 1,113 | 62.2% |
| Alliance | Warr | 403 | 22.5% |
| Conservative | Kolinski | 273 | 15.3% |
| Turnout | | | 37.0% |
| Labour hold | | | |

=== Bedwell Plash ===
Location of Bedwell Plash ward

Bedwell Plash
| Party | Candidate | Votes | % |
|---|---|---|---|
| Labour | M. Downing | 1,200 | 61.5% |
| Conservative | Percival | 394 | 20.2% |
| Alliance | Atkins | 356 | 18.3% |
| Turnout | | | 47.0% |
| Labour hold | | | |

=== Chells ===
Location of Chells ward

Chells
| Party | Candidate | Votes | % |
|---|---|---|---|
| Labour | K. Vale | 812 | 54.3% |
| Alliance | Batley | 350 | 23.4% |
| Conservative | Blanchette | 333 | 22.3% |
| Turnout | | | 44.3% |
| Labour hold | | | |

=== Longmeadow ===
Location of Longmeadow ward

Longmeadow
| Party | Candidate | Votes | % |
|---|---|---|---|
| Alliance | Boutell | 902 | 40.1% |
| Labour | J. Tye | 761 | 33.8% |
| Conservative | H. Grant | 586 | 26.1% |
| Turnout | | | 45.0% |
| Alliance gain from Labour | | | |

=== Martins Wood ===
Location of Martins Wood ward

Martins Wood
| Party | Candidate | Votes | % |
|---|---|---|---|
| Labour | Drake | 694 | 39.0% |
| Alliance | Akhurst | 674 | 37.9% |
| Conservative | M. Mason | 411 | 23.1% |
| Turnout | | | 32.3% |
| Labour hold | | | |

=== Mobbsbury ===
Location of Mobbsbury ward

Mobbsbury
| Party | Candidate | Votes | % |
|---|---|---|---|
| Alliance | Neal | 785 | 40.6% |
| Labour | Dunnell | 736 | 38.1% |
| Conservative | G. Smith | 411 | 21.3% |
| Turnout | | | 54.1% |
| Alliance gain from Labour | | | |

=== Monkswood ===
Location of Monkswood ward

Monkswood
| Party | Candidate | Votes | % |
|---|---|---|---|
| Labour | B. Jackson | 746 | 64.9% |
| Conservative | R. Edwards | 215 | 18.7% |
| Alliance | Ffinch | 188 | 16.4% |
| Turnout | | | 45.1% |
| Labour hold | | | |

=== Old Stevenage ===
Location of Old Stevenage ward

Old Stevenage
| Party | Candidate | Votes | % |
|---|---|---|---|
| Labour | H. Morris | 1,093 | 45.0% |
| Conservative | D. Eaton | 1,007 | 41.5% |
| Alliance | O'Callaghan | 327 | 13.5% |
| Turnout | | | 47.1% |
| Labour hold | | | |

=== Pin Green ===
Location of Pin Green ward

Pin Green
| Party | Candidate | Votes | % |
|---|---|---|---|
| Labour | A. Campbell | 868 | 49.5% |
| Alliance | J. Lucioli | 480 | 27.4% |
| Conservative | Portsmouth | 404 | 23.1% |
| Turnout | | | 44.6% |
| Labour hold | | | |

=== Roebuck ===
Location of Roebuck ward

Roebuck
| Party | Candidate | Votes | % |
|---|---|---|---|
| Labour | F. Schofield | 781 | 45.1% |
| Alliance | Edwards | 524 | 30.2% |
| Conservative | McPartland | 428 | 24.7% |
| Turnout | | | 40.7% |
| Labour hold | | | |

=== St Nicholas ===
Location of St Nicholas ward

St Nicholas
| Party | Candidate | Votes | % |
|---|---|---|---|
| Labour | R. Fowler | 632 | 44.7% |
| Alliance | J. Lucioli | 510 | 36.0% |
| Conservative | S. Woods | 273 | 19.3% |
| Turnout | | | 38.2% |
| Labour hold | | | |

=== Shephall ===
Location of Shephall ward

Shephall
| Party | Candidate | Votes | % |
|---|---|---|---|
| Labour | I. Johnson | 770 | 54.6% |
| Alliance | Akhurst | 405 | 28.7% |
| Conservative | Baillie | 236 | 16.7% |
| Turnout | | | 39.4% |
| Labour hold | | | |

=== Symonds Green ===
Location of Symonds Green ward

Symonds Green
| Party | Candidate | Votes | % |
|---|---|---|---|
| Labour | S. Munden | 932 | 42.0% |
| Conservative | J. Halling | 674 | 30.4% |
| Alliance | G. Balderstone | 614 | 27.7% |
| Turnout | | | 41.5% |
| Labour hold | | | |
