= 1982 Stevenage Borough Council election =

1982 UK local government election

- 6 May 1982

14 of the 39 seats to Stevenage Borough Council 20 seats needed for a majority
	First party	Second party	Third party
Party	Labour	Alliance	Conservative
Seats before	36	0	3
Seats won	6	7	1
Seats after	29	8	2
Seat change	▼7	▲8	▼1
Popular vote	8,643	8,119	5,817
Percentage	38.3%	36.0%	25.8%
- Map showing the results of contested wards in the 1982 Stevenage Borough Council elections.
Council control before election
Labour
Council control after election
Labour

The 1982 Stevenage Borough Council election took place on 6 May 1982. This was on the same day as other local elections. One third of the council was up for election and the Labour Party retained control of the council, which it had held continuously since its creation in 1973.

== Overall results ==
1982 Stevenage Borough Council Election
Party	Seats	Gains	Losses	Net gain/loss	Seats %	Votes %	Votes	+/−
Alliance	7	7	0	▲7	50.0	36.0	8,119	
Labour	6	0	6	▼6	42.9	38.3	8,643	
Conservative	1	0	1	▼1	7.1	25.8	5,817	
Total	14						22,579	
Labour hold								

== Ward results ==
=== Bandley Hill ===
Location of Bandley Hill ward

Bandley Hill
Party	Candidate	Votes	%
Labour	A. Luhman	817	43.0%
Alliance	C. Dale	705	37.1%
Conservative	F. Warner	377	19.9%
Turnout			42.6%
Labour hold			

=== Bedwell Plash ===
Location of Bedwell Plash ward

Bedwell Plash
Party	Candidate	Votes	%
Labour	W. Lawrence	868	45.8%
Alliance	P. Lucioli	583	30.8%
Conservative	A. Mann	443	23.4%
Turnout			45.2%
Labour hold			

=== Chells ===
Location of Chells ward

Chells
Party	Candidate	Votes	%
Labour	J. Clarke	664	45.4%
Alliance	K. Taylor	472	32.2%
Conservative	P. McPartland	328	22.4%
Turnout			43.3%
Labour hold			

=== Longmeadow ===
Location of Longmeadow ward

Longmeadow
Party	Candidate	Votes	%
Alliance	S. Booth	888	41.7%
Labour	W. Sheaff	661	31.0%
Conservative	H. Grant	581	27.3%
Turnout			43.2%
Alliance gain from Labour			

=== Martins Wood ===
Location of Martins Wood ward

Martins Wood
Party	Candidate	Votes	%
Alliance	D. Kelleher	635	38.6%
Labour	D. Weston	556	33.8%
Conservative	E. Hegan	456	27.7%
Turnout			40.5%
Alliance gain from Labour			

=== Mobbsbury ===
Location of Mobbsbury ward

Mobbsbury
Party	Candidate	Votes	%
Alliance	R. Parker	636	39.7%
Labour	J. Naduald	608	37.9%
Conservative	C. Aylin	359	22.4%
Turnout			46.7%
Alliance gain from Labour			

=== Monkswood ===
Location of Monkswood ward

Monkswood
Party	Candidate	Votes	%
Labour	K. Hopkins	584	50.1%
Alliance	R. Edwards	390	33.4%
Conservative	W. Trevennor	192	16.5%
Turnout			45.1%
Labour hold			

=== Old Stevenage ===
Location of Old Stevenage ward

Old Stevenage
Party	Candidate	Votes	%
Conservative	W. Boyd	987	41.1%
Labour	P. Hillier	783	32.6%
Alliance	J. Lucioli	634	26.4%
Turnout			47.9%
Conservative hold			

=== Pin Green ===
Location of Pin Green ward

Pin Green
Party	Candidate	Votes	%
Labour	R. Smith	636	40.4%
Alliance	L. Atkins	526	33.4%
Conservative	A. Ffinch	412	26.2%
Turnout			39.8%
Labour hold			

=== Roebuck ===
Location of Roebuck ward

Roebuck
Party	Candidate	Votes	%
Alliance	P. Selley	689	39.1%
Labour	M. Cherney	614	34.9%
Conservative	E. Baker	458	26.0%
Turnout			40.9%
Alliance gain from Conservative			

=== St Nicholas ===
Location of St Nicholas ward

St Nicholas
Party	Candidate	Votes	%
Alliance	I. Hargreaves	745	
Alliance	C. Cuthbert	718	
Labour	J. Graham	440	
Labour	M. Spears	399	
Conservative	S. Woods	294	
Conservative	B. Shorten	292	
Turnout			39.8%
Alliance gain from Labour			
Alliance gain from Labour			

=== Shephall ===
Location of Shephall ward

Shephall
Party	Candidate	Votes	%
Labour	S. Greenfield	704	49.3%
Alliance	K. McKechnie	467	32.7%
Conservative	J. Cannin	258	18.1%
Turnout			39.8%
Labour hold			

=== Symonds Green ===
Location of Symonds Green ward

Symonds Green
Party	Candidate	Votes	%
Alliance	J. Blundell	749	35.2%
Labour	M. Downing	708	33.3%
Conservative	D. Eaton	672	31.6%
Turnout			39.7%
Alliance gain from Labour			
