= Stevenage Borough Council =

Local authority for Stevenage, Hertfordshire, England

Coordinates: 51.900°N 0.203°W

Type
- Type: Non-metropolitan district

Leadership
- Mayor: Lloyd Briscoe, Labour since 21 May 2026
- Leader: Richard Henry, Labour since 1 January 2023
- Chief executive: Tom Pike since April 2025

Structure
- Seats: 39 councillors
- Political groups: Administration (21) Labour (21) Other parties (18) Reform (10) Liberal Democrats (6) Conservative (1) Independent (1)

Elections
- Voting system: First past the post
- Last election: 7 May 2026

Meeting place
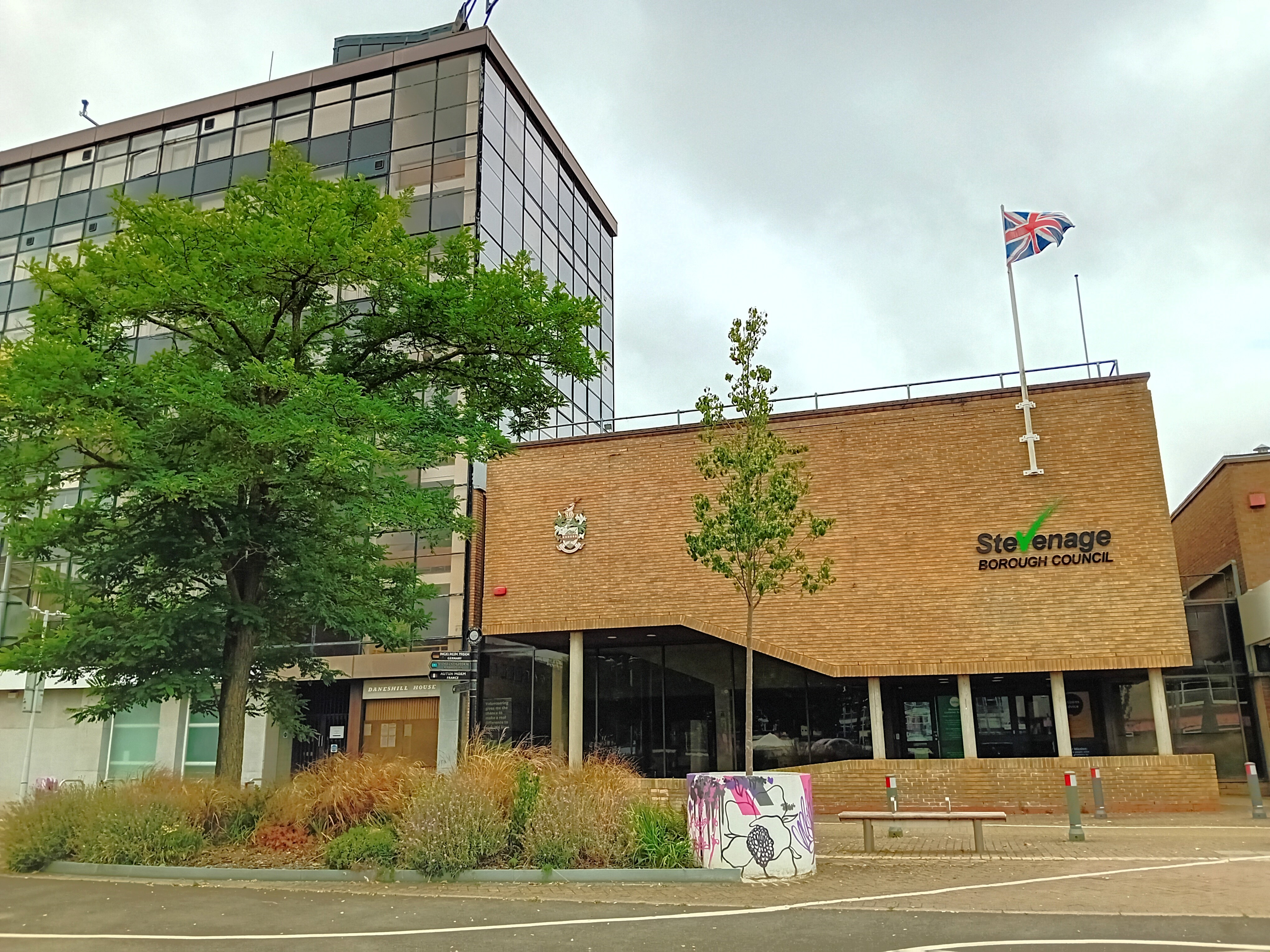
- Daneshill House, Danestrete, Stevenage, SG1 1HN

Website
- www.stevenage.gov.uk

Stevenage Borough Council is the local authority for Stevenage, a local government district with borough status in Hertfordshire, England. The council has been under Labour majority control since 1974. It is based at Daneshill House on Danestrete.

== History ==
Stevenage's first elected council was a local board established in 1873, prior to which the town had been administered by the parish vestry. Such local boards were converted into urban district councils in 1894. The Local Government Act 1972 reconstituted Stevenage Urban District as a non-metropolitan district with effect from 1 April 1974. The district was awarded borough status on the same date, allowing the chair of the council to take the title of mayor.

== Governance ==
Stevenage Borough Council provides district-level services. County-level functions are provided by Hertfordshire County Council. There are no civil parishes in the borough.

=== Political control ===
The first elections to the borough council as reformed under the Local Government Act 1972 were held in 1973, initially acting as a shadow authority until the new arrangements took effect on 1 April 1974. The Labour Party has held a majority of the seats on the council since 1974:

| Party in control | Years |
|---|---|
| Labour | 1974–present |

=== Leadership ===
The role of mayor is largely ceremonial in Stevenage, and is usually held by a different councillor each year. Political leadership is instead provided by the leader of the council. The leaders since 1974 have been:

| Councillor | Party | From | To |
|---|---|---|---|
| Brian Hall | Labour | 1974 | 23 May 2006 |
| Sharon Taylor | Labour | 23 May 2006 | 31 Dec 2022 |
| Richard Henry | Labour | 1 Jan 2023 | present |

=== Composition ===
Following the 2026 council elections.

| Party | Councillors |
|---|---|
| Labour | 21 |
| Reform | 10 |
| Liberal Democrats | 6 |
| Conservative | 1 |
| Independent | 1 |
| Total | 39 |

== Elections ==
Since the last ward boundary changes in 2024 the council has comprised 39 councillors, with the borough being divided into 13 wards each electing three councillors. Elections are held three years out of every four, electing one councillor from each ward each time to serve a four-year term of office. Hertfordshire County Council elections are held in the fourth year of the cycle when there are no borough council elections.

The wards are:

- Almond Hill
- Bandley Hill and Poplars
- Bedwell
- Chells
- Longmeadow
- Manor
- Martins Wood
- Old Town
- Roebuck
- St Nicholas
- Shephall
- Symonds Green
- Woodfield

== Premises ==
The council is based at Daneshill House on Danestrete in the town centre. The building was built in 1961 for the development corporation which oversaw the development of Stevenage as a New Town between 1946 and 1980. The building was bought by the council in 1980 when the development corporation was wound up.

== Arms ==
Coat of arms of Stevenage Borough Council
| Notes Originally granted to Stevenage Urban District Council on 10 March 1958. Crest Out of a crown palisado Or a demi hart Proper its sinister fore leg resting upon a cogwheel Gold. Escutcheon Argent on a mount in base point Vert an oak tree eradicated Proper fructed Or transfixed with a sword in bend sinister point downward also Proper hilt and pommel also Or and over all a fess Gules charged with six mullets of six points Gold. Motto The Heart Of A Town Lies In Its People. Other elements Vert doubled Argent mantling |
