= 1989 United Kingdom local elections =

- 4 May 1989 (England & Wales); 17 May 1989 (Northern Ireland)

All 39 non-metropolitan counties, 1 sui generis authority, all 26 Northern Irish districts and all 8 Welsh counties
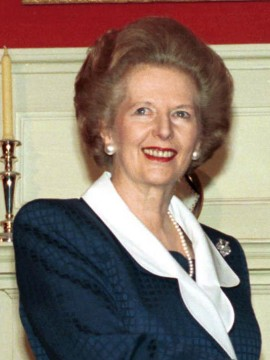

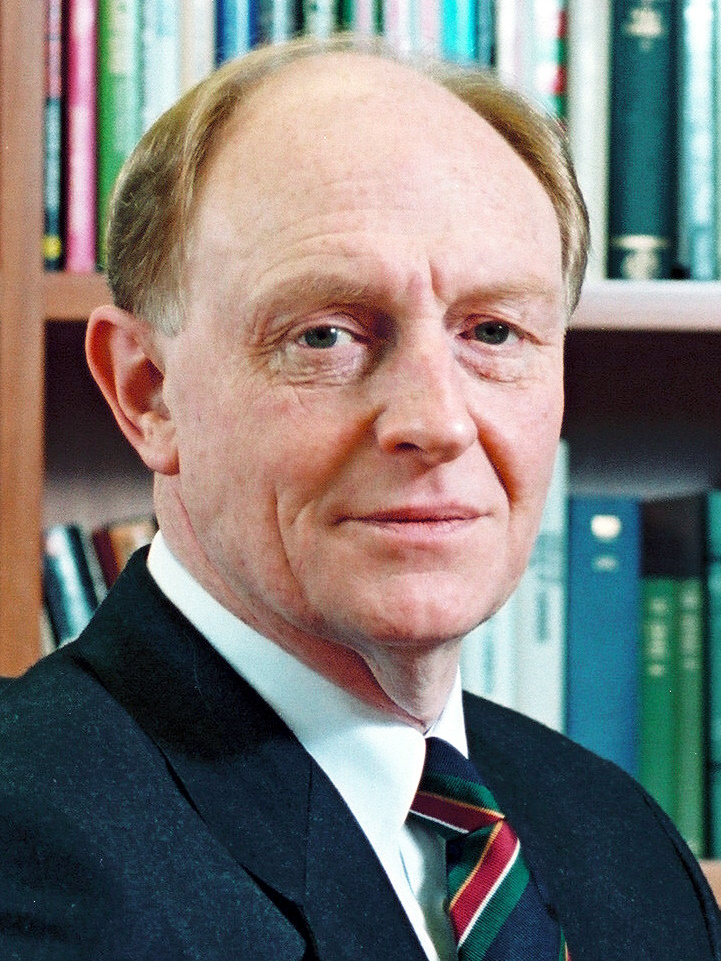

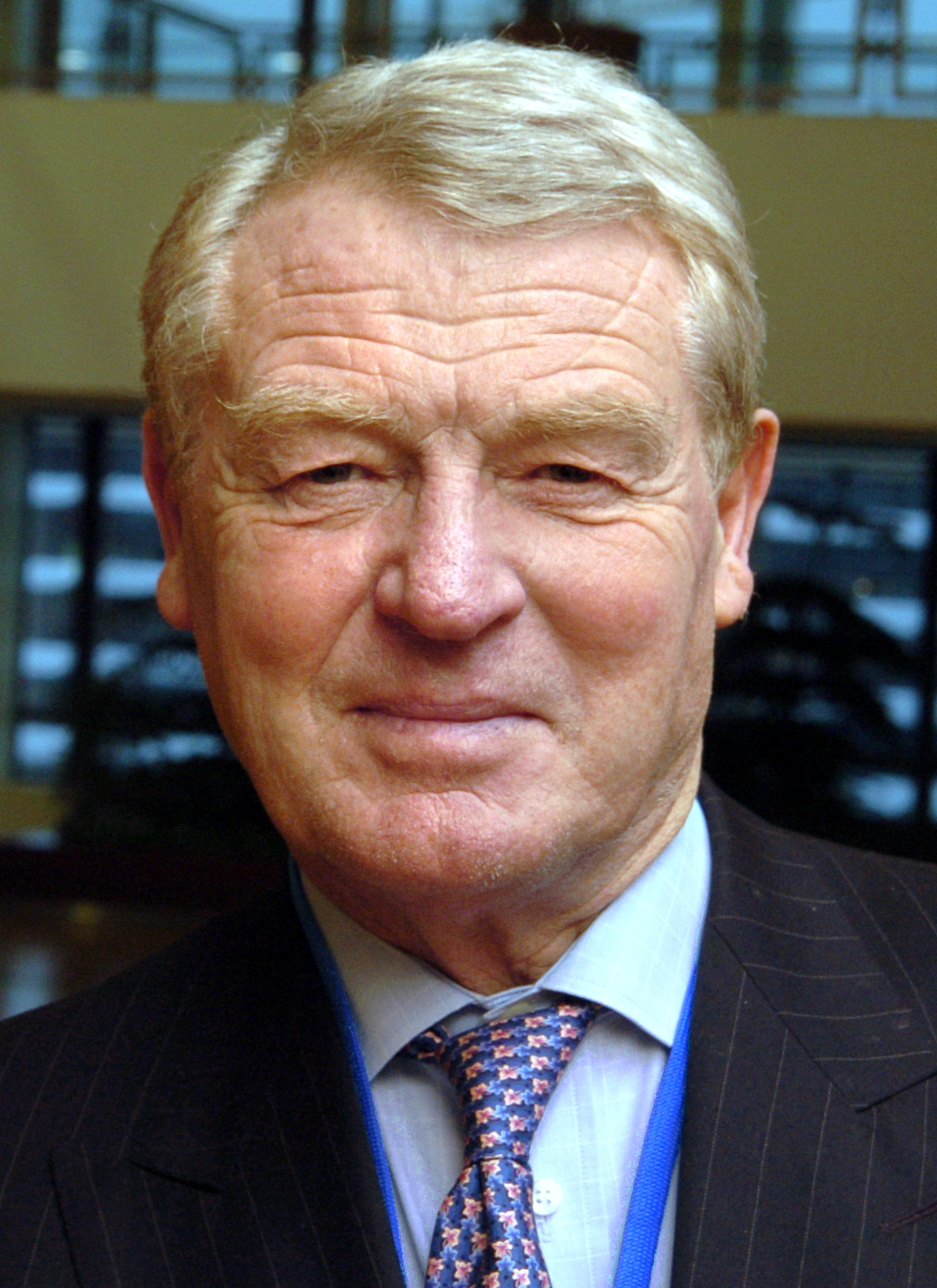
	Majority party	Minority party	Third party
Leader	Margaret Thatcher	Neil Kinnock	Paddy Ashdown
Party	Conservative	Labour	SLD
Leader since	11 February 1975	2 October 1983	16 July 1988
Percentage	36%	42%	19%
Councillors +/-	▲92	▲35	▼175
- Colours denote the winning party, as shown in the main table of results.

The 1989 United Kingdom local elections were held on Thursday 4 May 1989 in England and Wales, and Wednesday 17 May 1989 in Northern Ireland. The Labour Party had the highest projected national vote share, but the Conservative Party, in power at Westminster, gained the most seats. On the same day, there was a parliamentary by-election in the Vale of Glamorgan constituency in Wales; Labour won the seat from the Conservatives.

The national projected share of the vote was Labour 42%, Conservative 36%, Liberal Democrats 19%. The Conservatives gained 92 seats, Labour gained 35 seats and the Liberal Democrats lost 175 seats. It was Labour's largest share of the vote in any election in a decade, as the party's popularity continued to improve as a result of the ongoing modernisation process under Neil Kinnock, and that the Conservative government's popularity was starting to fall following the announcement of the poll tax.

== England ==
=== Non-metropolitan county councils ===
Council	Previous control	Result	Details
Avon	No overall control	No overall control hold	Details
Bedfordshire	No overall control	No overall control hold	Details
Berkshire	Conservative	Conservative hold	Details
Buckinghamshire	Conservative	Conservative hold	Details
Cambridgeshire	No overall control	Conservative gain	Details
Cheshire	No overall control	No overall control hold	Details
Cleveland	Labour	Labour hold	Details
Cornwall	No overall control	No overall control hold	Details
Cumbria	No overall control	No overall control hold	Details
Derbyshire	Labour	Labour hold	Details
Devon	No overall control	Conservative gain	Details
Dorset	Conservative	Conservative hold	Details
Durham	Labour	Labour hold	Details
East Sussex	No overall control	Conservative gain	Details
Essex	No overall control	Conservative gain	Details
Gloucestershire	No overall control	No overall control hold	Details
Hampshire	No overall control	Conservative gain	Details
Hereford and Worcester	Conservative	No overall control gain	Details
Hertfordshire	No overall control	Conservative gain	Details
Humberside	No overall control	Labour gain	Details
Isle of Wight	SLD	SLD hold	Details
Kent	Conservative	Conservative hold	Details
Lancashire	No overall control	Labour gain	Details
Leicestershire	No overall control	No overall control hold	Details
Lincolnshire	Conservative	Conservative hold	Details
Norfolk	Conservative	Conservative hold	Details
North Yorkshire	No overall control	No overall control hold	Details
Northamptonshire	No overall control	No overall control hold	Details
Northumberland	No overall control	Labour gain	Details
Nottinghamshire	Labour	Labour hold	Details
Oxfordshire	No overall control	No overall control hold	Details
Shropshire	No overall control	No overall control hold	Details
Somerset	No overall control	Conservative gain	Details
Staffordshire	Labour	Labour hold	Details
Suffolk	Conservative	Conservative hold	Details
Surrey	Conservative	Conservative hold	Details
Warwickshire	No overall control	Conservative gain	Details
West Sussex	Conservative	Conservative hold	Details
Wiltshire	No overall control	No overall control hold	Details

=== Sui generis ===
Council	Previous control	Result	Details
Isles of Scilly			Details

== Northern Ireland ==
Council	Previous control	Result	Details
Antrim	No overall control	UUP gain	Details
Ards	No overall control	No overall control hold	Details
Armagh	UUP	UUP hold	Details
Ballymena	DUP	DUP hold	Details
Ballymoney	No overall control	No overall control hold	Details
Banbridge	UUP	UUP hold	Details
Belfast	No overall control	No overall control hold	Details
Carrickfergus	No overall control	No overall control hold	Details
Castlereagh	No overall control	No overall control hold	Details
Coleraine	No overall control	No overall control hold	Details
Cookstown	No overall control	No overall control hold	Details
Craigavon	No overall control	No overall control hold	Details
Derry	No overall control	No overall control hold	Details
Down	No overall control	SDLP gain	Details
Dungannon	No overall control	No overall control hold	Details
Fermanagh	No overall control	No overall control hold	Details
Larne	No overall control	No overall control hold	Details
Limavady	No overall control	No overall control hold	Details
Lisburn	No overall control	UUP gain	Details
Magherafelt	No overall control	No overall control hold	Details
Moyle	No overall control	No overall control hold	Details
Newry and Mourne	No overall control	SDLP gain	Details
Newtownabbey	No overall control	No overall control hold	Details
North Down	No overall control	No overall control hold	Details
Omagh	No overall control	No overall control hold	Details
Strabane	No overall control	No overall control hold	Details

== Wales ==
=== County councils ===
Council	Previous control	Result	Details
Clwyd	No overall control	Labour gain	Details
Dyfed	No overall control	No overall control hold	Details
Gwent	Labour	Labour hold	Details
Gwynedd	Independent	Independent hold	Details
Mid Glamorgan	Labour	Labour hold	Details
Powys	Independent	Independent hold	Details
South Glamorgan	Labour	Labour hold	Details
West Glamorgan	Labour	Labour hold	Details
