= 1993 Hertfordshire County Council election =

Council election in England

← 1989	6 May 1993	1997 →

All 77 seats on Hertfordshire County Council 39 seats needed for a majority
- Registered: 743,888 (▼0.1%)
- Turnout: 38.8% (▼2.5%)
	First party	Second party
	Lab	Con
Leader	John Metcalf	Iris Tarry
Party	Labour	Conservative
Seats before	27	45
Seats after	30	27
Seat change	▲3	▼18
Popular vote	95,155	102,733
Percentage	33.4%	36.1%
Swing	▲0.3 pp	▼8.0 pp
	Third party	Fourth party
	LD	RA
Leader	Charles Gunner
Party	Liberal Democrats	Ratepayers
Seats before	5	0
Seats after	19	1
Seat change	▲14	▲1
Popular vote	80,676	3,390
Percentage	28.3%	1.2%
Swing	▲9.4 pp	N/A
Leader before election
Iris Tarry
Conservative
Leader after election
none
No overall control

Elections to Hertfordshire County Council were held on 6 May 1993, at the same time as other elections to county councils across England and Wales. All 77 seats on the county council were up for election.

The Conservatives lost control of the council to no overall control, with Labour forming the largest political group. Prior to the election the Conservative group leader, Iris Tarry, was leader of the council, having held that position since 1989. She stood down as leader of the Conservative group after the election, being replaced by Robert Gordon. No leader of the council was appointed in light of the council being under no overall control after the election.

== Results summary ==
1993 Hertfordshire County Council election
Party	Seats	Gains	Losses	Net gain/loss	Seats %	Votes %	Votes	+/−
Labour	30	4	1	▲3	39.0	33.4	95,155	+0.3
Conservative	27	0	18	▼18	35.1	36.1	102,733	-8.0
Liberal Democrats	19	14	0	▲14	24.7	28.3	80,676	+9.4
Ratepayers	1	1	0	▲1	1.3	1.2	3,390	N/A
Green	0	0	0	Steady	0.0	0.7	2,106	±0.0
Independent	0	0	0	Steady	0.0	0.1	297	±0.0
National Front	0	0	0	Steady	0.0	0.1	227	±0.0
BNP	0	0	0	Steady	0.0	<0.1	115	N/A

== Division results ==
=== Broxbourne ===
Broxbourne District Summary
Party	Seats	+/-	Votes	%	+/-
Conservative	5	▼1	8,264	45.4	–10.1
Labour	1	▲1	5,894	32.4	+3.1
Liberal Democrats	0	Steady	3,741	20.6	+6.7
Independent	0	Steady	297	1.6	N/A
Total	6	Steady	18,196	29.3	–1.6
Registered electors			62,183	–	+5.5

Division results

Cheshunt Central
Party	Candidate	Votes	%	±%
Conservative	M. Janes	1,226	43.7	−9.6
Labour	K. Dambrauskas	948	33.8	−2.7
Liberal Democrats	S. Diss	337	12.0	+1.8
Independent	K. Page	297	10.6	N/A
Majority		278	9.9	
Turnout		2,808	30.5	
Conservative hold		Swing	▼3.5	

Cheshunt North
Party	Candidate	Votes	%	±%
Conservative	B. Harlow*	1,079	47.2	−11.4
Labour	M. Theobald	763	33.4	+7.7
Liberal Democrats	J. Emslie	445	19.5	+3.8
Majority		316	13.8	
Turnout		2,287	22.9	
Conservative hold		Swing	▼9.6	

Cheshunt West
Party	Candidate	Votes	%	±%
Conservative	C. Tyler*	1,480	47.6	−15.9
Liberal Democrats	P. Seeby	916	29.5	+18.9
Labour	J. West	711	22.9	+4.7
Majority		564	18.2	
Turnout		3,107	27.2	
Conservative hold		Swing	▼17.4	

Hoddesdon North
Party	Candidate	Votes	%	±%
Conservative	J. Rose*	1,358	45.6	−10.3
Labour	A. Hillyard	896	30.1	+0.8
Liberal Democrats	E. Harrington	721	24.2	+9.4
Majority		462	15.5	
Turnout		2,975	31.1	
Conservative hold		Swing	▼5.6	

Hoddesdon South
Party	Candidate	Votes	%	±%
Conservative	H. Bird*	1,487	49.0	−10.9
Liberal Democrats	D. Morgan	922	30.4	+5.2
Labour	J. Holland	623	20.5	+5.6
Majority		565	18.6	
Turnout		3,032	28.4	
Conservative hold		Swing	▼8.1	

Waltham Cross
Party	Candidate	Votes	%	±%
Labour	M. Hudson	1,953	49.0	+3.4
Conservative	M. Lavender	1,634	41.0	−4.6
Liberal Democrats	P. Huse	400	10.0	+1.3
Majority		319	8.0	
Turnout		3,987	35.3	
Labour gain from Conservative		Swing	▲4.0	

=== Dacorum ===
Dacorum District Summary
Party	Seats	+/-	Votes	%	+/-
Labour	5	▲2	13,993	36.0	+2.8
Conservative	3	▼4	14,242	36.6	–7.1
Liberal Democrats	2	▲2	9,807	25.2	+11.6
Green	0	Steady	643	1.7	+0.2
National Front	0	Steady	227	0.6	+0.4
Total	10	Steady	38,912	38.3	–2.5
Registered electors			101,518	–	–0.5

Division results

Berkhamsted
Party	Candidate	Votes	%	±%
Liberal Democrats	A. Horton	1,932	40.7	+13.9
Conservative	H. Rost*	1,726	36.4	−9.7
Labour	D. Freeman	950	20.0	−1.1
Green	D. Tookey	138	2.9	N/A
Majority		206	4.3	
Turnout		4,746	39.5	
Liberal Democrats gain from Conservative		Swing	▲11.8	

Bridgewater
Party	Candidate	Votes	%	±%
Conservative	A. Williams	1,618	53.8	−12.0
Labour	S. Tupper	661	22.0	+5.6
Liberal Democrats	I. McCalla	601	20.0	+8.1
Green	D. Metcalfe	130	4.3	N/A
Majority		957	31.8	
Turnout		3,010	37.0	
Conservative hold		Swing	▼8.8	

Hemel Hempstead East
Party	Candidate	Votes	%	±%
Labour	C. Letanka	1,549	42.1	+11.6
Conservative	G. Odell	1,491	40.5	−7.2
Liberal Democrats	R. Cottrell	637	17.3	+2.7
Majority		58	1.6	
Turnout		3,677	40.2	
Labour gain from Conservative		Swing	▲9.4	

Hemel Hempstead North East
Party	Candidate	Votes	%	±%
Labour	I. Laidlaw-Dickenson	1,352	41.7	+8.5
Conservative	S. Sullivan	1,133	34.9	±0.0
Liberal Democrats	C. Robins	642	19.8	+7.6
Green	P. Craddock	115	3.5	N/A
Majority		219	6.8	
Turnout		3,242	31.2	
Labour gain from Conservative		Swing	▲4.3	

Hemel Hempstead North West
Party	Candidate	Votes	%	±%
Labour	D. Moss*	2,324	55.6	+5.6
Conservative	M. Mitchell	915	21.9	−5.5
Liberal Democrats	E. Willis	855	20.5	+11.6
National Front	J. McAuley	86	2.1	+0.4
Majority		1,409	33.7	
Turnout		4,180	40.2	
Labour hold		Swing	▲5.6	

Hemel Hempstead South East
Party	Candidate	Votes	%	±%
Labour	C. Cushion	2,228	51.2	+3.2
Conservative	A. Richardson	1,322	30.4	−6.6
Liberal Democrats	G. Edwards	800	18.4	+10.2
Majority		906	20.8	
Turnout		4,350	40.3	
Labour hold		Swing	▲4.9	

Hemel Hempstead St. Pauls
Party	Candidate	Votes	%	±%
Labour	P. Doyle*	1,765	54.9	−3.4
Liberal Democrats	G. Lawrence	784	24.4	+16.1
Conservative	A. Williams	626	19.5	−5.8
National Front	S. Keen	39	1.2	N/A
Majority		981	30.5	
Turnout		3,214	36.7	
Labour hold		Swing	▲9.8	

Hemel Hempstead Town
Party	Candidate	Votes	%	±%
Conservative	C. Everall	1,993	44.7	−6.9
Labour	R. Barson	1,580	35.4	+3.8
Liberal Democrats	R. Pexton	888	19.9	+12.2
Majority		413	9.3	
Turnout		4,461	37.7	
Conservative hold		Swing	▼5.4	

Kings Langley
Party	Candidate	Votes	%	±%
Conservative	A. Anderson	1,471	46.3	−3.3
Labour	A. Gale	929	29.2	−0.7
Liberal Democrats	S. Tustin	675	21.2	+4.2
National Front	S. Deacon	102	3.2	N/A
Majority		542	17.1	
Turnout		3,177	36.1	
Conservative hold		Swing	▼1.3	

Tring
Party	Candidate	Votes	%	±%
Liberal Democrats	B. Batchelor	1,993	41.1	+22.8
Conservative	James Jameson	1,947	40.1	−12.9
Labour	R. Dickenson	655	13.5	−0.5
Green	C. Kruger	260	5.4	−6.8
Majority		46	0.9	
Turnout		4,855	43.2	
Liberal Democrats gain from Conservative		Swing	▲17.9	

=== East Hertfordshire ===
East Hertfordshire District Summary
Party	Seats	+/-	Votes	%	+/-
Conservative	5	▼3	15,293	44.8	–5.2
Liberal Democrats	3	▲3	10,965	32.1	+9.0
Labour	1	Steady	7,213	21.1	+1.1
Green	0	Steady	667	2.0	–0.2
Total	9	Steady	34,138	37.8	–3.7
Registered electors			90,223	–	+1.2

Division results

All Saints
Party	Candidate	Votes	%	±%
Liberal Democrats	S. Knott	1,638	41.2	+9.2
Conservative	H. Banks*	1,457	36.7	−3.3
Labour	J. Oliver	879	22.1	+1.8
Majority		181	4.6	
Turnout		3,793	44.6	
Liberal Democrats gain from Conservative		Swing	▲6.3	

Bishops Stortford Central Parsonage
Party	Candidate	Votes	%	±%
Liberal Democrats	G. Francis	1,590	47.6	+25.7
Conservative	K. Armstrong	997	29.9	−9.7
Labour	J. Boyd	613	18.4	+2.0
Green	P. Thomas	137	4.1	N/A
Majority		593	17.8	
Turnout		3,337	30.8	
Liberal Democrats gain from Conservative		Swing	▲17.7	

Bishops Stortford Chantry Thorley
Party	Candidate	Votes	%	±%
Conservative	J. Fielder*	1,882	52.5	−0.5
Liberal Democrats	M. Swainston	1,118	31.2	+18.6
Labour	D. Arrowsmith	454	12.7	+2.6
Green	S. Mackenzie	133	3.7	N/A
Majority		764	21.3	
Turnout		3,587	33.2	
Conservative hold		Swing	▲9.6	

Braughing
Party	Candidate	Votes	%	±%
Conservative	J. Pitman*	1,929	55.5	−8.9
Liberal Democrats	A. Crossley	777	22.4	+4.9
Labour	R. Whatmore	631	18.2	+0.1
Green	L. Wright	139	4.0	N/A
Majority		1,152	33.1	
Turnout		3,476	37.4	
Conservative hold		Swing	▼6.9	

Hertford Rural
Party	Candidate	Votes	%	±%
Conservative	R. Tucker*	2,213	51.3	−8.8
Liberal Democrats	R. Ansell	1,237	28.7	+16.1
Labour	B. Littlechild	860	20.0	−0.1
Majority		976	22.6	
Turnout		4,310	39.7	
Conservative hold		Swing	▼12.5	

Sawbridgeworth
Party	Candidate	Votes	%	±%
Conservative	B. Smalley*	1,598	47.8	−10.8
Liberal Democrats	D. Baker	1,149	32.3	+5.4
Labour	A. Huband	567	15.9	+1.4
Green	C. Denning	141	4.0	N/A
Majority		449	15.4	
Turnout		3,455	33.7	
Conservative hold		Swing	▼8.1	

St. Andrews
Party	Candidate	Votes	%	±%
Labour	N. Lindop	1,902	50.7	+2.2
Conservative	J. Sartin	1,342	35.8	−0.6
Liberal Democrats	J. Coote	504	13.4	+3.7
Majority		560	14.9	
Turnout		3,748	44.5	
Labour hold		Swing	▲1.4	

Ware North
Party	Candidate	Votes	%	±%
Liberal Democrats	D. Watkins	1,994	43.8	+1.4
Conservative	P. Dye*	1,942	42.7	−1.5
Labour	D. Davies	612	13.5	+0.1
Majority		52	1.1	
Turnout		4,548	45.7	
Liberal Democrats gain from Conservative		Swing	▲1.5	

Ware South
Party	Candidate	Votes	%	±%
Conservative	R. Copping	1,933	52.2	−1.5
Liberal Democrats	N. Eden-Green	958	25.9	−1.5
Labour	B. Cartwright	695	18.8	±0.0
Green	B. Evans	117	3.2	N/A
Majority		975	26.3	
Turnout		3,703	34.9	
Conservative hold		Swing	0.0	

=== Hertsmere ===
Hertsmere District Summary
Party	Seats	+/-	Votes	%	+/-
Conservative	4	Steady	8,812	37.8	–10.6
Labour	2	Steady	8,664	37.2	+4.0
Liberal Democrats	1	Steady	5,845	25.1	+11.8
Total	7	Steady	23,321	34.7	–1.6
Registered electors			67,232	–	–0.9

Division results

Bushey Heath
Party	Candidate	Votes	%	±%
Conservative	J. Hudson*	1,220	49.2	−10.4
Liberal Democrats	M. Silverman	890	35.9	+8.4
Labour	D. Hoeksma	371	15.0	+2.1
Majority		330	13.3	
Turnout		2,481	31.1	
Conservative hold		Swing	▼9.4	

Bushey North
Party	Candidate	Votes	%	±%
Liberal Democrats	M. Colne*	2,891	69.2	+11.6
Conservative	B. Flashman	858	20.5	−12.9
Labour	S. Mercado	431	10.3	+1.3
Majority		2,033	48.6	
Turnout		4,180	41.7	
Liberal Democrats hold		Swing	▲12.3	

Elstree
Party	Candidate	Votes	%	±%
Labour	B. York	2,227	57.3	+7.3
Conservative	J. Wilson	1,124	28.9	−11.8
Liberal Democrats	P. Hedges	533	13.7	+10.2
Majority		1,103	28.4	
Turnout		3,884	34.5	
Labour hold		Swing	▲9.6	

Lyndhurst
Party	Candidate	Votes	%	±%
Labour	J. Metcalf*	2,193	75.1	+8.4
Conservative	H. Watson	727	24.9	+1.1
Majority		1,466	50.2	
Turnout		2,920	28.2	
Labour hold		Swing	▲3.7	

Potters Bar North East
Party	Candidate	Votes	%	±%
Conservative	A. Gray*	1,449	53.8	−19.0
Liberal Democrats	C. Dean	674	25.0	N/A
Labour	S. Parkins	571	21.2	−6.0
Majority		775	28.8	
Turnout		2,694	33.6	
Conservative hold		Swing	N/A	

Potters Bar South West
Party	Candidate	Votes	%	±%
Conservative	M. Johnson	1,407	41.5	−22.3
Labour	M. Vessey	1,123	33.2	−3.0
Liberal Democrats	D. Martin	857	25.3	N/A
Majority		284	8.4	
Turnout		3,387	37.4	
Conservative hold		Swing	▼9.7	

Watling
Party	Candidate	Votes	%	±%
Conservative	A. Kilkerr	2,027	53.7	−1.4
Labour	P. Stanley	1,748	46.3	+18.2
Majority		279	7.4	
Turnout		3,775	35.8	
Conservative hold		Swing	▼9.8	

=== North Hertfordshire ===
North Hertfordshire District Summary
Party	Seats	+/-	Votes	%	+/-
Conservative	4	▼3	12,784	35.4	–9.2
Labour	3	▲1	11,464	31.8	–1.1
Liberal Democrats	1	▲1	8,428	23.4	+9.0
Ratepayers	1	▲1	3,390	9.4	N/A
Total	9	Steady	36,066	41.7	–3.1
Registered electors			86,540	–	+1.7

Division results

Hitchin North East
Party	Candidate	Votes	%	±%
Labour	F. Peacock*	2,074	46.5	+3.2
Ratepayers	C. Parker	1,534	34.4	N/A
Conservative	M. East	575	12.9	−3.0
Liberal Democrats	P. Cunningham	274	6.1	+1.4
Majority		540	12.1	
Turnout		4,457	41.6	
Labour hold		Swing	N/A	

Hitchin South
Party	Candidate	Votes	%	±%
Ratepayers	T. Brooker	1,199	36.4	N/A
Conservative	D. Ashley*	1,025	31.2	−23.9
Liberal Democrats	P. Clark	580	17.6	+2.2
Labour	D. Sangha	486	14.8	−3.2
Majority		174	5.3	
Turnout		3,290	41.6	
Ratepayers gain from Conservative		Swing	N/A	

Knebworth and Codicote
Party	Candidate	Votes	%	±%
Conservative	R. Ellis*	1,807	51.4	−10.3
Labour	K. Omer	1,052	29.9	+6.8
Liberal Democrats	R. Martin	655	18.6	+3.3
Majority		755	21.5	
Turnout		3,514	39.3	
Conservative hold		Swing	▼8.6	

Letchworth East & Baldock
Party	Candidate	Votes	%	±%
Labour	N. Haslam	1,952	41.9	−1.0
Conservative	V. Crellin*	1,712	36.8	−8.6
Liberal Democrats	B. Hunter	994	21.3	+14.8
Majority		240	5.2	
Turnout		4,658	38.4	
Labour gain from Conservative		Swing	▲3.8	

Letchworth North West
Party	Candidate	Votes	%	±%
Labour	N. Agar	1,987	53.4	−4.4
Conservative	R. Drinkwater	965	25.9	−4.2
Liberal Democrats	R. Hall	770	20.7	+8.6
Majority		1,022	27.5	
Turnout		3,722	40.4	
Labour hold		Swing	▼0.1	

Letchworth South
Party	Candidate	Votes	%	±%
Liberal Democrats	J. Winder	2,235	44.3	+25.7
Conservative	A. Burrows*	1,760	34.9	−14.1
Labour	A. Hartley	1,049	20.8	−2.4
Majority		475	9.4	
Turnout		5,044	47.6	
Liberal Democrats gain from Conservative		Swing	▲19.9	

North Herts Rural
Party	Candidate	Votes	%	±%
Conservative	B. Goble*	1,800	52.1	−9.2
Liberal Democrats	A. Wilson	1,148	33.2	+15.3
Labour	R. Leete	507	14.7	−6.1
Majority		652	18.9	
Turnout		3,455	44.8	
Conservative hold		Swing	▼12.3	

Offa
Party	Candidate	Votes	%	±%
Labour	S. Tendeter	1,489	40.6	−7.7
Conservative	W. Aspinall	1,143	31.2	−6.3
Ratepayers	P. Hawkins	657	17.9	N/A
Liberal Democrats	V. Walker	377	10.3	−3.9
Majority		346	9.4	
Turnout		3,666	41.5	
Labour hold		Swing	▼0.7	

Royston
Party	Candidate	Votes	%	±%
Conservative	L. Doyle*	1,997	46.9	−4.7
Liberal Democrats	H. Harron	1,395	32.7	+7.0
Labour	J. Etheridge	868	20.4	+2.7
Majority		602	14.1	
Turnout		4,260	40.6	
Conservative hold		Swing	▼5.9	

=== St. Albans ===
St Albans District Summary
Party	Seats	+/-	Votes	%	+/-
Liberal Democrats	7	▲4	18,609	44.5	+12.3
Labour	2	Steady	10,831	25.9	+1.1
Conservative	1	▼4	12,425	29.7	–13.3
Total	10	Steady	41,865	44.3	–2.4
Registered electors			94,589	–	–0.7

Division results

Harpenden North East
Party	Candidate	Votes	%	±%
Liberal Democrats	D. Newbury-Ecob	2,482	51.0	+22.2
Conservative	J. Hudson*	1,757	36.1	−19.1
Labour	D. Crew	629	12.9	−3.1
Majority		725	14.9	
Turnout		4,868	45.8	
Liberal Democrats gain from Conservative		Swing	▲20.7	

Harpenden South West
Party	Candidate	Votes	%	±%
Conservative	I. Tarry*	2,084	54.6	−11.2
Liberal Democrats	A. Steer	1,202	31.5	+10.6
Labour	E. Gale	528	13.8	+0.4
Majority		882	23.1	
Turnout		3,814	38.1	
Conservative hold		Swing	▼10.9	

Sandridge
Party	Candidate	Votes	%	±%
Liberal Democrats	L. Coates	2,025	55.0	+13.5
Conservative	K. Haywood*	1,171	31.8	−13.9
Labour	D. Bartley	485	13.2	+0.3
Majority		854	23.2	
Turnout		3,681	43.1	
Liberal Democrats gain from Conservative		Swing	▲13.9	

St. Albans Central
Party	Candidate	Votes	%	±%
Liberal Democrats	C. White	2,174	52.9	+12.4
Labour	L. Warren	931	22.6	−5.2
Conservative	A. Hill	897	21.8	−9.9
Green	C. Simmons	111	2.7	N/A
Majority		1,243	30.2	
Turnout		4,113	46.3	
Liberal Democrats hold		Swing	▲8.8	

St. Albans East
Party	Candidate	Votes	%	±%
Liberal Democrats	C. Gunner*	2,110	49.7	+3.2
Labour	F. McCarthy	1,116	26.3	+3.3
Conservative	G. Myland	836	19.7	−10.8
Green	E. Benjamin	184	4.3	N/A
Majority		994	23.4	
Turnout		4,246	44.0	
Liberal Democrats hold		Swing	▼0.1	

St. Albans North
Party	Candidate	Votes	%	±%
Liberal Democrats	A. Rowlands	2,040	43.0	+12.2
Labour	J. Gipps	1,593	33.6	+2.6
Conservative	C. Ellis	1,108	23.4	−14.6
Majority		447	9.4	
Turnout		4,741	49.3	
Liberal Democrats gain from Conservative		Swing	▲4.8	

St. Albans Rural
Party	Candidate	Votes	%	±%
Liberal Democrats	G. Tattersfield	2,207	54.1	+8.5
Conservative	R. Scranage*	1,423	34.9	−18.8
Labour	K. Holmes	1,044	22.0	+10.2
Majority		784	19.2	
Turnout		4,674	45.1	
Liberal Democrats gain from Conservative		Swing	▲13.7	

St. Albans South
Party	Candidate	Votes	%	±%
Labour	Kerry Pollard*	2,358	49.8	+5.0
Conservative	G. Brown	1,334	28.2	−10.8
Liberal Democrats	R. Graham	1,044	22.0	+5.9
Majority		1,024	21.6	
Turnout		4,736	47.3	
Labour hold		Swing	▲7.9	

St. Stephens
Party	Candidate	Votes	%	±%
Liberal Democrats	M. Moore*	2,608	59.0	+14.8
Conservative	J. Tomlinson	1,290	29.2	−14.8
Labour	L. Adams	525	11.9	+0.1
Majority		1,318	29.8	
Turnout		4,423	44.5	
Liberal Democrats hold		Swing	▲14.8	

The Colneys
Party	Candidate	Votes	%	±%
Labour	R. Sanderson	1,622	56.6	+1.5
Liberal Democrats	S. Defoe	717	25.0	+11.1
Conservative	H. Haynes	525	18.3	−12.7
Majority		905	31.6	
Turnout		2,864	34.6	
Labour hold		Swing	▼4.8	

=== Stevenage ===
Stevenage District Summary
Party	Seats	+/-	Votes	%	+/-
Labour	6	Steady	11,750	58.6	+1.8
Conservative	0	Steady	5,158	25.7	–1.0
Liberal Democrats	0	Steady	3,143	15.7	+0.4
Total	6	Steady	20,051	35.4	–1.1
Registered electors			56,570	–	–0.1

Division results

Bedwell
Party	Candidate	Votes	%	±%
Labour	T. Kent	2,172	69.3	+1.8
Conservative	P. Gonzalez	559	17.8	−4.3
Liberal Democrats	G. Robbins	405	12.9	+2.5
Majority		1,613	51.4	
Turnout		3,136	36.0	
Labour hold		Swing	▲3.1	

Broadwater
Party	Candidate	Votes	%	±%
Labour	M. Warren*	1,996	60.2	+3.1
Conservative	M. Hurst	716	21.6	−1.5
Liberal Democrats	P. Perry	605	18.2	−1.7
Majority		1,280	38.6	
Turnout		3,317	36.7	
Labour hold		Swing	▲2.3	

Chells
Party	Candidate	Votes	%	±%
Labour	B. Hall	1,727	61.7	+1.1
Conservative	S. Hammond	574	20.5	−1.5
Liberal Democrats	A. Tron	496	17.7	+0.3
Majority		1,153	41.2	
Turnout		2,797	36.1	
Labour hold		Swing	▲1.3	

Old Stevenage
Party	Candidate	Votes	%	±%
Labour	R. Clark*	2,263	51.0	+3.7
Conservative	R. Dimelow	1,689	38.1	−1.8
Liberal Democrats	S. Grubert	484	10.9	−1.9
Majority		574	12.9	
Turnout		4,436	41.6	
Labour hold		Swing	▲2.8	

Shephall
Party	Candidate	Votes	%	±%
Labour	S. Munden*	1,859	66.3	−2.6
Conservative	S. Hammond	547	19.5	−0.3
Liberal Democrats	P. Marshall	398	14.2	+2.9
Majority		1,312	46.8	
Turnout		2,804	30.2	
Labour hold		Swing	▼1.2	

St. Nicholas
Party	Candidate	Votes	%	±%
Labour	R. Smith	1,733	48.7	+4.0
Conservative	N. Poulton	1,073	30.1	+2.3
Liberal Democrats	J. Hunt	755	21.2	+0.7
Majority		600	14.9	
Turnout		3,561	44.5	
Labour hold		Swing	▲0.9	

=== Three Rivers ===
Three Rivers District Summary
Party	Seats	+/-	Votes	%	+/-
Liberal Democrats	3	▲2	11,650	41.8	+12.4
Conservative	3	▼2	11,277	40.5	–10.5
Labour	1	Steady	4,832	17.3	–2.3
BNP	0	Steady	115	0.4	N/A
Total	7	Steady	27,874	42.5	+0.3
Registered electors			65,531	–	–2.7

Division results

Abbots Langley
Party	Candidate	Votes	%	±%
Liberal Democrats	P. Goggins	2,839	52.7	+16.1
Conservative	T. Williams	1,419	26.4	−7.1
Labour	N. Newton	1,124	20.9	−9.0
Majority		1,420	26.4	
Turnout		5,382	45.7	
Liberal Democrats hold		Swing	▲11.6	

Chorleywood
Party	Candidate	Votes	%	±%
Liberal Democrats	T. Venner	2,335	51.6	+14.6
Conservative	F. Cogan*	1,937	42.8	−13.8
Labour	G. Read	254	5.6	−0.8
Majority		398	8.8	
Turnout		4,526	46.3	
Liberal Democrats gain from Conservative		Swing	▲14.2	

Croxley
Party	Candidate	Votes	%	±%
Liberal Democrats	T. Ambrose	2,614	62.2	+19.0
Conservative	K. Andrew	1,273	30.3	−13.5
Labour	P. Knight	313	7.5	−5.5
Majority		1,341	31.9	
Turnout		4,200	51.5	
Liberal Democrats gain from Conservative		Swing	▲16.3	

North Mymms
Party	Candidate	Votes	%	±%
Conservative	R. Johnson*	2,058	68.5	−9.9
Liberal Democrats	R. Dubow	576	19.2	+6.3
Labour	M. Parry	370	12.3	+3.6
Majority		1,482	49.3	
Turnout		3,004	36.0	
Conservative hold		Swing	▼8.1	

Oxhey Park
Party	Candidate	Votes	%	±%
Conservative	G. Button*	1,874	55.3	−12.5
Liberal Democrats	C. Dean	1,021	30.1	+7.6
Labour	S. Parkins	492	14.5	+4.8
Majority		853	25.2	
Turnout		3,387	37.7	
Conservative hold		Swing	▼10.1	

Rickmansworth
Party	Candidate	Votes	%	±%
Conservative	B. Lamb	2,176	47.4	−8.2
Liberal Democrats	E. Waller	1,844	40.2	+9.4
Labour	M. Bird	572	12.5	−1.1
Majority		332	7.2	
Turnout		4,592	46.4	
Conservative hold		Swing	▼8.8	

South Oxhey
Party	Candidate	Votes	%	±%
Labour	J. Hobday	1,707	61.3	−2.1
Conservative	N. Stewart	540	19.4	−5.8
Liberal Democrats	T. Staffe	421	15.1	+3.7
BNP	P. Illing	115	4.1	N/A
Majority		1,167	41.9	
Turnout		2,783	32.6	
Labour hold		Swing	▲1.9	

=== Watford ===
Watford District Summary
Party	Seats	+/-	Votes	%	+/-
Labour	3	▼1	7,878	38.5	–9.5
Liberal Democrats	2	▲2	6,326	30.9	+17.0
Conservative	1	▼1	6,015	29.4	–8.7
Green	0	Steady	238	1.2	N/A
Total	6	Steady	20,457	36.3	–4.1
Registered electors			56,281	–	–0.6

Division results

Callowland Leggatts
Party	Candidate	Votes	%	±%
Labour	E. McNally*	1,445	62.1	−3.7
Conservative	G. Ogden	533	22.9	−1.3
Liberal Democrats	J. Richmond	349	15.0	+5.0
Majority		912	39.2	
Turnout		2,327	29.1	
Labour hold		Swing	▼1.2	

Central Oxhey
Party	Candidate	Votes	%	±%
Liberal Democrats	J. Blackman	1,874	44.2	+26.8
Labour	M. Pakenham	1,194	28.1	−12.9
Conservative	J. Price*	1,174	27.7	−13.9
Majority		680	16.0	
Turnout		4,242	45.3	
Liberal Democrats gain from Conservative		Swing	▲19.9	

Meriden Tudor
Party	Candidate	Votes	%	±%
Labour	M. Green	1,798	51.1	−2.6
Conservative	P. Bell	1,052	29.9	−5.3
Liberal Democrats	M. Bedford	551	15.6	+4.4
Green	A. Cripps	120	3.4	N/A
Majority		746	21.2	
Turnout		3,521	34.5	
Labour hold		Swing	▲1.4	

Nascot Park
Party	Candidate	Votes	%	±%
Conservative	R. Gordon*	1,745	54.7	−8.6
Liberal Democrats	R. Martin	728	22.8	+1.5
Labour	T. Meldrum	602	18.9	+3.5
Green	I. Tottman	118	3.7	N/A
Majority		1,017	31.9	
Turnout		3,193	35.0	
Conservative hold		Swing	▼5.1	

Vicarage Holywell
Party	Candidate	Votes	%	±%
Labour	S. Meldrum*	1,670	56.8	−2.9
Conservative	P. Jenkins	683	23.2	−5.8
Liberal Democrats	J. Baddeley	585	19.9	+8.6
Majority		987	33.6	
Turnout		2,938	30.2	
Labour hold		Swing	▲1.5	

Woodside Stanborough
Party	Candidate	Votes	%	±%
Liberal Democrats	A. Lee	2,239	52.9	+41.0
Labour	A. Ramsden	1,169	27.6	−27.7
Conservative	S. Jones	828	19.5	−13.3
Majority		1,070	25.3	
Turnout		4,236	42.9	
Liberal Democrats gain from Labour		Swing	▲34.4	

=== Welwyn Hatfield ===
Welwyn Hatfield District Summary
Party	Seats	+/-	Votes	%	+/-
Labour	5	Steady	13,680	49.0	+0.5
Conservative	2	Steady	9,786	35.0	–3.3
Liberal Democrats	0	Steady	4,202	15.0	+3.9
Green	0	Steady	263	0.9	+0.2
Total	7	Steady	27,931	44.2	–3.9
Registered electors			63,221	–	–1.4

Division results

Haldens
Party	Candidate	Votes	%	±%
Labour	M. Nash*	2,509	55.5	−2.4
Conservative	K. Kethke	1,408	31.1	+3.2
Liberal Democrats	C. Gabell	485	10.7	+1.7
Green	D. Ashton	119	2.6	−2.6
Majority		1,101	24.4	
Turnout		4,521	44.8	
Labour hold		Swing	▼2.8	

Hatfield East
Party	Candidate	Votes	%	±%
Conservative	H. Burningham*	1,692	45.3	−9.2
Labour	G. Nolan	1,475	39.5	+6.1
Liberal Democrats	A. Chapman	570	15.3	+3.3
Majority		217	5.8	
Turnout		3,737	47.1	
Conservative hold		Swing	▼7.7	

Hatfield North
Party	Candidate	Votes	%	±%
Labour	F. Clayton	2,034	60.4	+3.1
Conservative	L. Hodsdon	852	25.3	−6.2
Liberal Democrats	M. Richardson	482	14.3	+3.1
Majority		1,182	35.1	
Turnout		3,368	38.8	
Labour hold		Swing	▲4.7	

Hatfield South
Party	Candidate	Votes	%	±%
Labour	G. Wenham*	1,707	52.3	−2.7
Conservative	C. Croft	1,001	30.7	−4.2
Liberal Democrats	R. Griffiths	557	17.1	+7.0
Majority		706	21.6	
Turnout		3,265	41.9	
Labour hold		Swing	▲0.8	

Welwyn
Party	Candidate	Votes	%	±%
Conservative	R. Smith	1,949	51.0	−7.4
Labour	K. Le Mare	1,133	29.7	+2.0
Liberal Democrats	D. Bartlett	738	19.3	+5.4
Majority		816	21.4	
Turnout		3,820	41.8	
Conservative hold		Swing	▼4.7	

Welwyn Garden City South
Party	Candidate	Votes	%	±%
Labour	D. Kerr*	2,567	66.1	+3.4
Conservative	L. Stanbury	894	23.0	−0.1
Liberal Democrats	D. Cooke	425	10.9	+6.1
Majority		1,673	43.1	
Turnout		3,886	45.3	
Labour hold		Swing	▲1.8	

Welwyn Garden City West
Party	Candidate	Votes	%	±%
Labour	R. Mays*	2,255	42.3	−2.7
Conservative	K. Prentice	1,990	37.3	−2.4
Liberal Democrats	A. Skottowe	945	17.7	+2.4
Green	S. Welham	144	2.7	N/A
Majority		265	5.0	
Turnout		5,334	48.4	
Labour hold		Swing	▼0.2	
