= 1997 Hertfordshire County Council election =

1997 UK local government election

← 1993	1 May 1997	2001 →

All 77 seats to Hertfordshire County Council 39 seats needed for a majority
	First party	Second party	Third party
	Con	Lab	LD
Leader	Robert Ellis	John Metcalf	Chris White
Party	Conservative	Labour	Liberal Democrats
Seats won	38	30	9
Seat change	▲11	Steady	▼10
Popular vote	229,983	201,619	138,692
Percentage	40.1%	35.2%	24.2%
Leader before election
John Metcalf
Labour
No overall control
Leader after election
John Metcalf
Labour
No overall control

1997 Hertfordshire County Council elections were held on 1 May 1997, with all 77 seats contested. The Council remained under no overall control. The Conservatives formed the largest political group, but the Labour and Liberal Democrat groups formed a coalition to run the council.

== Ward results ==
Hertfordshire County Council Election Results 1997
Party	Seats	Gains	Losses	Net gain/loss	Seats %	Votes %	Votes	+/−
Conservative	38			+11	49.35	40.10	229,983	
Labour	30			0	38.96	35.16	201,619	
Liberal Democrats	9			-10	11.69	24.19	138,692	
Independent	0			-1	0.00	0.42	2,390	
Green	0			0	0.00	0.04	518	
Socialist Alliance	0			0	0.00	0.04	253	

=== By district ===
Broxbourne District County Council Election Results 1997
Party	Seats	Gains	Losses	Net gain/loss	Seats %	Votes %	Votes	+/−
Conservative	6				100.00	50.83	22,186	
Labour	0				0.00	33.85	14,777	
Liberal Democrats	0				0.00	15.32	6,688	

Dacorum District County Council Election Results 1997
Party	Seats	Gains	Losses	Net gain/loss	Seats %	Votes %	Votes	+/−
Conservative	6				60.00	42.12	33,182	
Labour	4				40.00	35.96	28,329	
Liberal Democrats	0				0.00	21.92	17,271	

East Herts District County Council Election Results 1997
Party	Seats	Gains	Losses	Net gain/loss	Seats %	Votes %	Votes	+/−
Conservative	7				77.78	45.07	32,240	
Labour	1				11.11	26.99	19,306	
Liberal Democrats	1				11.11	25.41	18,179	
Independent	0				0.00	1.81	1,293	
Green	0				0.00	0.72	518	

Hertsmere District County Council Election Results 1997
Party	Seats	Gains	Losses	Net gain/loss	Seats %	Votes %	Votes	+/−
Conservative	4				57.15	43.80	22,066	
Labour	2				28.57	34.42	17,340	
Liberal Democrats	1				14.28	21.77	10,968	

North Herts District County Council Election Results 1997
Party	Seats	Gains	Losses	Net gain/loss	Seats %	Votes %	Votes	+/−
Conservative	5				55.55	41.19	27,702	
Labour	4				44.45	36.98	24,873	
Liberal Democrats	0				0.00	21.83	14,684	

St Albans District County Council Election Results 1997
Party	Seats	Gains	Losses	Net gain/loss	Seats %	Votes %	Votes	+/−
Conservative	3				30.00	36.27	27,669	
Liberal Democrats	3				30.00	34.06	25,981	
Labour	4				40.00	29.67	22,631	

Stevenage District County Council Election Results 1997
Party	Seats	Gains	Losses	Net gain/loss	Seats %	Votes %	Votes	+/−
Labour	6				100.00	56.22	23,866	
Conservative	0				0.00	27.82	11,811	
Liberal Democrats	0				0.00	15.36	6,519	
Socialist Alliance	0				0.00	0.60	253	

Three Rivers District County Council Election Results 1997
Party	Seats	Gains	Losses	Net gain/loss	Seats %	Votes %	Votes	+/−
Conservative	3				50.00	40.22	18,234	
Liberal Democrats	2				33.33	35.45	16,062	
Labour	1				16.67	24.33	11,032	

Watford District County Council Election Results 1997
Party	Seats	Gains	Losses	Net gain/loss	Seats %	Votes %	Votes	+/−
Labour	3				50.00	39.79	16,899	
Conservative	1				16.67	32.01	13,593	
Liberal Democrats	2				33.33	28.20	11,975	

Welwyn Hatfield District County Council Election Results 1997
Party	Seats	Gains	Losses	Net gain/loss	Seats %	Votes %	Votes	+/−
Labour	5				62.50	40.80	22,566	
Conservative	3				37.50	38.50	21,292	
Liberal Democrats	0				0.00	18.72	10,355	
Independent	0				0.00	1.98	1,097	

== Division Results ==
=== Broxbourne (6 Seats) ===
Cheshunt Central 1 May 1997 Broxbourne District
Party	Candidate	Votes	%	±%
Conservative	Michael Janes	3,171	51.09	
Labour	Christopher Simonovitch	2,140	34.48	
Liberal Democrats	Heather Campbell	896	14.43	
Majority		1,031	16.61	
Turnout		6,207	69.08	

Cheshunt North 1 May 1997 Broxbourne District
Party	Candidate	Votes	%	±%
Conservative	Alan Searing	3,208	48.27	
Labour	Linda Dambrauskas	2,586	38.91	
Liberal Democrats	Sheila Guy	852	12.82	
Majority		622	9.36	
Turnout		6,646	66.21	

Cheshunt West 1 May 1997 Broxbourne District
Party	Candidate	Votes	%	±%
Conservative	Gerald Game	4,721	56.50	
Labour	James Meadows	2,376	28.43	
Liberal Democrats	Peter Huse	1,259	15.07	
Majority		2,345	28.07	
Turnout		8,356	72.23	

Hoddesdon North 1 May 1997 Broxbourne District
Party	Candidate	Votes	%	±%
Conservative	John Morton	3,417	48.23	
Labour	Neil Harvey	2,485	35.07	
Liberal Democrats	Anthony Fey	1,183	16.70	
Majority		932	13.16	
Turnout		7,085	71.41	

Hoddesdon South 1 May 1997 Broxbourne District
Party	Candidate	Votes	%	±%
Conservative	Moyra O'Neill	4,259	55.32	
Labour	James Emslie	1,929	25.06	
Liberal Democrats	Frank Bassill	1,511	19.62	
Majority		2,330	30.26	
Turnout		7,699	71.41	

Waltham Cross 1 May 1997 Broxbourne District
Party	Candidate	Votes	%	±%
Conservative	Russell Thomas	3,418	44.59	
Labour	Mark Farrington	3,261	42.54	
Liberal Democrats	John Doolan	987	12.87	
Majority		157	2.05	
Turnout		7,666	66.88	

=== Dacorum (10 Seats) ===
Berkhampstead 1 May 1997 Dacorum District
Party	Candidate	Votes	%	±%
Conservative	Kenneth Coleman	3,999	41.48	
Liberal Democrats	Andrew Horton	3,485	36.15	
Labour	Paul Dyett	2,157	22.37	
Majority		514	5.33	
Turnout		9,641	78.05	

Bridgewater 1 May 1997 Dacorum District
Party	Candidate	Votes	%	±%
Conservative	Julian Taunton	3,709	57.27	
Labour	Brian Fisher	1,527	23.58	
Liberal Democrats	Margaret Hawgood	1,240	19.15	
Majority		2,182	33.69	
Turnout		6,476	78.78	

Hemel Hempstead East 1 May 1997 Dacorum District
Party	Candidate	Votes	%	±%
Conservative	Peter Channell	3,234	45.23	
Labour	Christina Letanka	2,837	39.67	
Liberal Democrats	Carol Richardson	1,080	15.10	
Majority		397	5.56	
Turnout		7,151	78.96	

Hemel Hempstead North East 1 May 1997 Dacorum District
Party	Candidate	Votes	%	±%
Labour	Brian Wing	3,301	44.49	
Conservative	Sonia Sullivan	2,640	35.59	
Liberal Democrats	John Blackman	1,478	19.92	
Majority		661	8.90	
Turnout		7,419	70.13	

Hemel Hempstead North West 1 May 1997 Dacorum District
Party	Candidate	Votes	%	±%
Labour	Ian Laidlaw-Dickson	4,014	48.98	
Conservative	Anthony Gallagher	2,863	34.93	
Liberal Democrats	Raymond Hardy	1,319	16.09	
Majority		1,151	14.05	
Turnout		8,196	78.35	

Hemel Hempstead St Paul 1 May 1997 Dacorum District
Party	Candidate	Votes	%	±%
Labour	Richard Hebborn	3,394	52.65	
Conservative	Janice Marshall	1,663	25.79	
Liberal Democrats	Geoffrey Lawrence	1,390	21.56	
Majority		1,731	26.86	
Turnout		6,447	73.73	

Hemel Hempstead South East 1 May 1997 Dacorum District
Party	Candidate	Votes	%	±%
Labour	Philip Aldis	3,979	48.07	
Conservative	John Jameson	2,915	35.21	
Liberal Democrats	John Witt	1,384	16.72	
Majority		1,064	12.86	
Turnout		8,278	75.57	

Hemel Hempstead Town 1 May 1997 Dacorum District
Party	Candidate	Votes	%	±%
Conservative	Jennifer Beesley	4,149	45.69	
Labour	Robert Hutchinson	3,292	36.25	
Liberal Democrats	Robert Pexton	1,640	18.06	
Majority		857	9.44	
Turnout		9,081	76.75	

Kings Langley 1 May 1997 Dacorum District
Party	Candidate	Votes	%	±%
Conservative	Janet Anderson	3,825	53.72	
Labour	Peter Kraft	2,007	28.18	
Liberal Democrats	Christine Ayrton	1,289	18.10	
Majority		1,818	25.54	
Turnout		7,121	80.25	

Tring 1 May 1997 Dacorum District
Party	Candidate	Votes	%	±%
Conservative	Stanley Mills	4,185	46.64	
Liberal Democrats	John Brooks	2,966	33.06	
Labour	Dilys Carter	1,821	20.30	
Majority		1,219	13.58	
Turnout		8,972	77.95	

=== East Herts (9 Seats) ===
All Saints 1 May 1997 East Herts District
Party	Candidate	Votes	%	±%
Conservative	Francis Escott	2,888	37.59	
Liberal Democrats	Simon Knott	2,643	34.40	
Labour	Barbara Lerner	2,152	28.01	
Majority		245	3.19	
Turnout		7,683	77.94	

Bishop's Stortford Central Parsonage 1 May 1997 East Herts District
Party	Candidate	Votes	%	±%
Liberal Democrats	Gerald Francis	3,055	37.67	
Conservative	John Wyllie	2,894	35.69	
Labour	Philip Tripp	2,160	26.64	
Majority		161	1.98	
Turnout		8,109	73.48	

Bishop's Stortford Chantry Thorley 1 May 1997 East Herts District
Party	Candidate	Votes	%	±%
Conservative	Bernard Engel	4,686	49.65	
Liberal Democrats	Andrew Graham	2,555	27.07	
Labour	Richard Bayliss	1,941	20.57	
Green	Richard Goate	256	2.71	
Majority		2,131	22.58	
Turnout		9,438	76.10	

Braughing 1 May 1997 East Herts District
Party	Candidate	Votes	%	±%
Conservative	Jane Pitman	4,121	54.26	
Labour	Amanda Porter	1,928	25.38	
Liberal Democrats	Martin Harris	1,546	20.36	
Majority		2,193	28.88	
Turnout		7,595	78.39	

Hertford Rural 1 May 1997 East Herts District
Party	Candidate	Votes	%	±%
Conservative	Bryan Hammond	4,557	52.33	
Labour	Thomas McNicholas	2,527	29.01	
Liberal Democrats	John Wing	1,625	18.66	
Majority		2,030	23.32	
Turnout		8,709	79.46	

St Andrews 1 May 1997 East Herts District
Party	Candidate	Votes	%	±%
Labour	Norman Lindop	2,838	44.55	
Conservative	James Thornton	2,426	38.08	
Liberal Democrats	Jack Coote	1,106	17.37	
Majority		412	6.47	
Turnout		6,370	75.43	

Sawbridgeworth 1 May 1997 East Herts District
Party	Candidate	Votes	%	±%
Conservative	Mary Bayes	3,405	41.83	
Labour	Julia Madell	1,666	20.47	
Liberal Democrats	Andrew MacPherson	1,514	18.60	
Independent	Bryan Smalley	1,293	15.88	
Green	Suzanne Mackenzie	262	3.22	
Majority		1,739	21.36	
Turnout		8,140	75.92	

Ware North 1 May 1997 East Herts District
Party	Candidate	Votes	%	±%
Conservative	David Beatty	3,171	41.31	
Liberal Democrats	Martin Coleman	2,498	32.54	
Labour	John Courtneidge	2,007	26.15	
Majority		673	8.77	
Turnout		7,676	76.05	

Ware South 1 May 1997 East Herts District
Party	Candidate	Votes	%	±%
Conservative	Richard Copping	4,092	52.35	
Labour	Jenny Holland	2,087	26.70	
Liberal Democrats	Victoria Shaw	1,637	20.95	
Majority		2,005	25.65	
Turnout		7,816	73.09	

=== Hertsmere (7 Seats) ===
Bushey Heath 1 May 1997 Hertsmere District
Party	Candidate	Votes	%	±%
Conservative	Peter Riches	3,345	55.18	
Liberal Democrats	Roger Kutchinsky	1,641	27.07	
Labour	David Bearfield	1,076	17.75	
Majority		1,704	28.11	
Turnout		6,062	76.23	

Bushey North 1 May 1997 Hertsmere District
Party	Candidate	Votes	%	±%
Liberal Democrats	Michael Colne	3,724	49.40	
Conservative	Audrey Attwood	2,376	31.52	
Labour	Dinah Hoeksma	1,438	19.08	
Majority		1,348	17.88	
Turnout		7,538	74.95	

Elstree 1 May 1997 Hertsmere District
Party	Candidate	Votes	%	±%
Labour	Brian York	3,634	45.54	
Conservative	Howard Spratt	3,321	41.62	
Liberal Democrats	Mark Silverman	1,025	12.84	
Majority		313	3.92	
Turnout		7,980	71.37	

Lyndhurst 1 May 1997 Hertsmere District
Party	Candidate	Votes	%	±%
Labour	John Metcalf	4,010	55.77	
Conservative	David McKee	2,236	31.09	
Liberal Democrats	Lynne Hodgson	945	13.14	
Majority		1,774	24.68	
Turnout		7,191	68.57	

Potters Bar North East 1 May 1997 Hertsmere District
Party	Candidate	Votes	%	±%
Conservative	Alexandra Gray	3,125	52.93	
Labour	Michael Brilliant	1,798	30.45	
Liberal Democrats	Sean Bishop	981	16.62	
Majority		1,327	22.48	
Turnout		5,904	75.56	

Potters Bar South West 1 May 1997 Hertsmere District
Party	Candidate	Votes	%	±%
Conservative	John Usher	3,231	46.19	
Labour	Michael Elliot	2,432	34.76	
Liberal Democrats	Colin Dean	1,333	19.05	
Majority		799	11.43	
Turnout		6,996	75.93	

Watling 1 May 1997 Hertsmere District
Party	Candidate	Votes	%	±%
Conservative	Anthony Kilkerr	4,432	50.92	
Labour	Richard Kirk	2,952	33.92	
Liberal Democrats	Roger Briggs	1,319	15.16	
Majority		1,480	17.00	
Turnout		8,703	75.54	

=== North Herts (9 Seats) ===
Hitchin North East 1 May 1997 North Herts District
Party	Candidate	Votes	%	±%
Labour	Frederick Peacock	4,304	55.37	
Conservative	Nigel Brook	2,148	27.64	
Liberal Democrats	Jonathan Heath	1,321	16.99	
Majority		2,156	27.73	
Turnout		7,773	74.02	

Hitchin South 1 May 1997 North Herts District
Party	Candidate	Votes	%	±%
Conservative	Derrick Ashley	2,734	43.97	
Liberal Democrats	Robert Lord	1,996	32.10	
Labour	Jean Twose	1,488	23.93	
Majority		738	11.87	
Turnout		6,218		

Knebworth & Codicote 1 May 1997 North Herts District
Party	Candidate	Votes	%	±%
Conservative	Robert Ellis	4,688	65.48	
Labour	Timothy Liddy	2,471	34.52	
Majority		2,217	30.96	
Turnout		7,159	79.93	

Letchworth East & Baldock 1 May 1997 North Herts District
Party	Candidate	Votes	%	±%
Labour	Neil Haslam	3,833	41.94	
Conservative	Bernard Crow	3,387	37.07	
Liberal Democrats	John White	1,918	20.99	
Majority		446	4.87	
Turnout		9,138	75.03	

Letchworth North West 1 May 1997 North Herts District
Party	Candidate	Votes	%	±%
Labour	Nigel Agar	3,680	52.01	
Conservative	Raymond Shakespeare-Smith	2,134	30.16	
Liberal Democrats	Marion Minards-Gammell	1,262	17.83	
Majority		1,546	21.85	
Turnout		7,076	74.99	

Letchworth South 1 May 1997 North Herts District
Party	Candidate	Votes	%	±%
Conservative	Keith Emsall	3,134	37.35	
Liberal Democrats	John Winder	2,722	32.44	
Labour	John Gardner	2,535	30.21	
Majority		412	4.91	
Turnout		8,391	78.09	

North Herts Rural 1 May 1997 North Herts District
Party	Candidate	Votes	%	±%
Conservative	Jane Dwerryhouse-Spears	3,354	50.61	
Liberal Democrats	Roger Pritchard	1,980	29.87	
Labour	Kenneth Garland	1,294	19.52	
Majority		1,374	20.74	
Turnout		6,628	81.23	

Offa 1 May 1997 North Herts District
Party	Candidate	Votes	%	±%
Labour	Simon Tendeter	2,901	43.11	
Conservative	Wilfred Aspinall	2,717	40.37	
Liberal Democrats	Victoria Warwick	1,112	16.52	
Majority		184	2.74	
Turnout		6,730	75.07	

Royston 1 May 1997 North Herts District
Party	Candidate	Votes	%	±%
Conservative	Doug Drake	3,406	41.81	
Liberal Democrats	Patricia Baxter	2,373	29.13	
Labour	Robin King	2,367	29.06	
Majority		1,033	12.68	
Turnout		8,146	76.08	

=== St Albans (10 Seats) ===
Harpenden North East 1 May 1997 St Albans District
Party	Candidate	Votes	%	±%
Conservative	David Lloyd	3,599	42.53	
Liberal Democrats	David Waddilove	3,067	36.24	
Labour	Harold Homes	1,797	21.23	
Majority		532	6.29	
Turnout		8,463	78.67	

Harpenden South West 1 May 1997 St Albans District
Party	Candidate	Votes	%	±%
Conservative	Iris Tarry	4,676	55.10	
Liberal Democrats	James Ogborn	2,466	29.06	
Labour	Rosemary Ross	1,344	15.84	
Majority		2,210	26.04	
Turnout		8,486	80.35	

St Albans Central 1 May 1997 St Albans District
Party	Candidate	Votes	%	±%
Liberal Democrats	Christopher White	3,056	42.74	
Labour	John Whale	2,343	32.76	
Conservative	Victor Holley	1,752	24.50	
Majority		713	9.98	
Turnout		7,151	76.70	

St Albans East 1 May 1997 St Albans District
Party	Candidate	Votes	%	±%
Labour	Jill Gipps	3,169	41.37	
Liberal Democrats	Richard Biddle	2,649	34.58	
Conservative	Michael Elsdon	1,842	24.05	
Majority		520	6.79	
Turnout		7,660	77.15	

St Albans North 1 May 1997 St Albans District
Party	Candidate	Votes	%	±%
Labour	Roma Mills	2,961	37.40	
Liberal Democrats	David Warren	2,530	31.96	
Conservative	Clare Ellis	2,426	30.64	
Majority		431	5.44	
Turnout		7,917	79.17	

St Albans Rural 1 May 1997 St Albans District
Party	Candidate	Votes	%	±%
Conservative	Derek Hills	3,194	44.48	
Liberal Democrats	Niel Clements	2,279	31.74	
Labour	Michael Fletcher	1,708	23.78	
Majority		915	12.74	
Turnout		7,181	78.26	

St Albans South 1 May 1997 St Albans District
Party	Candidate	Votes	%	±%
Labour	Michael Wilson	2,994	36.92	
Conservative	John Smith	2,743	33.83	
Liberal Democrats	Elizabeth Penton	2,372	29.25	
Majority		251	3.09	
Turnout		8,109	78.74	

St Stephen's 1 May 1997 St Albans District
Party	Candidate	Votes	%	±%
Liberal Democrats	Michael Moore	3,215	39.75	
Conservative	Gordon Myland	3,045	37.65	
Labour	Patricia Allen	1,828	22.60	
Majority		170	2.10	
Turnout		8,088	77.33	

Sandridge 1 May 1997 St Albans District
Party	Candidate	Votes	%	±%
Liberal Democrats	Geoffrey Churchard	2,907	42.32	
Conservative	Christopher Whiteside	2,602	37.89	
Labour	Janetta Gibbs	1,359	19.79	
Majority		305	4.43	
Turnout		6,868	79.95	

The Colneys 1 May 1997 St Albans District
Party	Candidate	Votes	%	±%
Labour	Rosemary Sanderson	3,128	49.20	
Conservative	Derek jeffrey	1,790	28.15	
Liberal Democrats	David Priestman	1,440	22.65	
Majority		1,338	21.05	
Turnout		6,358	71.82	

=== Stevenage (6 Seats) ===
Bedwell 1 May 1997 Stevenage District
Party	Candidate	Votes	%	±%
Labour	Tanis Kent	3,988	65.31	
Conservative	Sheila Woods	1,404	23.00	
Liberal Democrats	Katherine Lloyd	714	11.69	
Majority		2,584	42.31	
Turnout		6,106	75.19	

Broadwater 1 May 1997 Stevenage District
Party	Candidate	Votes	%	±%
Labour	Ann Webb	3,640	56.15	
Conservative	Peter McPartland	1,853	28.59	
Liberal Democrats	Jonathan Amblin	989	15.26	
Majority		1,787	27.56	
Turnout		6,482	75.51	

Chells 1 May 1997 Stevenage District
Party	Candidate	Votes	%	±%
Labour	Brian Hall	3,201	56.57	
Conservative	Gwen Hegan	1,273	22.50	
Liberal Democrats	Margaret Latham	1,184	20.93	
Majority		1,928	34.07	
Turnout		5,658	75.97	

Old Stevenage 1 May 1997 Stevenage District
Party	Candidate	Votes	%	±%
Labour	Robert Clark	4,261	50.69	
Conservative	Ralph Dimelow	2,840	33.79	
Liberal Democrats	Jennifer Moorcroft	1,305	15.52	
Majority		1,421	16.90	
Turnout		8,406	75.15	

St Nicholas 1 May 1997 Stevenage District
Party	Candidate	Votes	%	±%
Labour	Reginald Smith	4,743	51.95	
Conservative	Edward Hegan	2,866	31.39	
Liberal Democrats	Mary Griffith	1,521	16.66	
Majority		1,877	20.56	
Turnout		9,130	73.69	

Shephall 1 May 1997 Stevenage District
Party	Candidate	Votes	%	±%
Labour	Stanley Munden	4,033	60.49	
Conservative	Sherree Huetson	1,575	23.62	
Liberal Democrats	Barbara Segadelli	806	12.09	
Socialist Alliance	Jane James	253	3.80	
Majority		2,458	36.87	
Turnout		6,667	73.50	

=== Three Rivers (6 Seats) ===
Abbots Langley 1 May 1997 Three Rivers District
Party	Candidate	Votes	%	±%
Liberal Democrats	Paul Goggins	4,036	42.16	
Conservative	Richard Simons	2,900	30.29	
Labour	Derek Peters	2,637	27.55	
Majority		1,136	11.87	
Turnout		9,573	77.03	

Chorleywood 1 May 1997 Three Rivers District
Party	Candidate	Votes	%	±%
Conservative	Gerald Pulman	3,890	48.17	
Liberal Democrats	Timothy Venner	3,416	42.30	
Labour	Mary Bruce	770	9.53	
Majority		474	5.87	
Turnout		8,076	79.73	

Croxley 1 May 1997 Three Rivers District
Party	Candidate	Votes	%	±%
Liberal Democrats	Thomas Ambrose	3,495	52.46	
Conservative	Francis Williams	2,146	32.21	
Labour	Dilys Freeman	1,021	15.33	
Majority		1,349	20.25	
Turnout		6,662	80.70	

Oxhey Park 1 May 1997 Three Rivers District
Party	Candidate	Votes	%	±%
Conservative	Frances Button	3,755	52.31	
Labour	David Lake	1,721	23.97	
Liberal Democrats	Stuart Glen	1,703	23.72	
Majority		2,034	28.34	
Turnout		7,179	76.54	

Rickmansworth 1 May 1997 Three Rivers District
Party	Candidate	Votes	%	±%
Conservative	Barbara Lamb	4,095	50.24	
Liberal Democrats	Richard Struck	2,359	28.94	
Labour	Kevin Harley	1,697	20.82	
Majority		1,736	21.30	
Turnout		8,151	76.93	

South Oxhey 1 May 1997 Three Rivers District
Party	Candidate	Votes	%	±%
Labour	Jane Hobday	3,186	55.92	
Conservative	Anna Gardiner	1,448	25.42	
Liberal Democrats	Raymond Tully	1,063	18.66	
Majority		1,738	30.50	
Turnout		5,697	67.09	

=== Watford (6 Seats) ===
Callowland Leggatts 1 May 1997 Watford District
Party	Candidate	Votes	%	±%
Labour	Elizabeth Rafferty	2,999	51.21	
Conservative	Timothy Williams	1,518	25.92	
Liberal Democrats	Joyce Richmond	1,339	22.87	
Majority		1,481	25.29	
Turnout		5,856	71.65	

Central Oxhey 1 May 1997 Watford District
Party	Candidate	Votes	%	±%
Liberal Democrats	Graham Burrow	2,651	37.44	
Labour	John Dowdle	2,440	34.46	
Conservative	Geoffrey Greenstreet	1,990	28.10	
Majority		211	2.98	
Turnout		7,081	70.71	

Meriden Tudor 1 May 1997 Watford District
Party	Candidate	Votes	%	±%
Labour	Maria Green	3,760	48.19	
Conservative	Sheila Jones	2,473	31.69	
Liberal Democrats	Roy Laslett	1,570	20.12	
Majority		1,287	16.50	
Turnout		7,803	74.77	

Nascot Park 1 May 1997 Watford District
Party	Candidate	Votes	%	±%
Conservative	Julia Price	3,695	50.03	
Liberal Democrats	Peter Jenkins	1,963	26.58	
Labour	Steven Palmer	1,727	23.39	
Majority		1,732	23.45	
Turnout		7,385	76.02	

Vicarage Hollywell 1 May 1997 Watford District
Party	Candidate	Votes	%	±%
Labour	Abdul Choudhrey	3,676	52.28	
Conservative	Paul Jenkins	2,078	29.55	
Liberal Democrats	Ahmed Zafar	1,278	18.17	
Majority		1,598	22.73	
Turnout		7,032	67.33	

Woodside Stanborough 1 May 1997 Watford District
Party	Candidate	Votes	%	±%
Liberal Democrats	Aislinn Lee	3,174	43.42	
Labour	Glyn Abraham	2,297	31.42	
Conservative	David Hobbs	1,839	25.16	
Majority		877	12.00	
Turnout		7,310	73.64	

=== Welwyn Hatfield (8 Seats) ===
Haldens 1 May 1997 Welwyn Hatfield District
Party	Candidate	Votes	%	±%
Labour	Robert Mays	3,820	48.68	
Conservative	Keith Pieri	2,571	32.77	
Liberal Democrats	Maurice Richardson	1,456	18.55	
Majority		1,249	15.91	
Turnout		7,847	77.91	

Hatfield East 1 May 1997 Welwyn Hatfield District
Party	Candidate	Votes	%	±%
Conservative	Hilary Burningham	2,561	42.93	
Labour	Susan Jones	2,300	38.56	
Liberal Democrats	Lis Mayland-Smith	1,104	18.51	
Majority		261	4.37	
Turnout		5,965	76.55	

Hatfield North 1 May 1997 Welwyn Hatfield District
Party	Candidate	Votes	%	±%
Labour	Frank Clayton	3,360	53.85	
Conservative	John Morgan	1,755	28.13	
Liberal Democrats	Alexander Benakis	1,124	18.02	
Majority		1,605	25.72	
Turnout		6,239	75.39	

Hatfield South 1 May 1997 Welwyn Hatfield District
Party	Candidate	Votes	%	±%
Labour	George Wenham	2,355	40.76	
Conservative	Balwant Kachiwala	1,341	23.21	
Independent	Deborah Piper	1,097	18.98	
Liberal Democrats	Richard Griffiths	985	17.05	
Majority		1,014	77.09	
Turnout		5,778	17.55	

North Mymms 1 May 1997 Welwyn Hatfield District
Party	Candidate	Votes	%	±%
Conservative	William Storey	4,321	67.58	
Liberal Democrats	Robin DuBow	1,110	17.36	
Labour	Margaret Toch	963	15.06	
Majority		3,211	50.22	
Turnout		6,394	78.50	

Welwyn 1 May 1997 Welwyn Hatfield District
Party	Candidate	Votes	%	±%
Conservative	Richard Smith	3,816	50.50	
Labour	Hilary Sepahy	2,101	27.81	
Liberal Democrats	Daniel Cooke	1,639	21.69	
Majority		1,715	22.69	
Turnout		7,556	81.64	

Welwyn Garden City South 1 May 1997 Welwyn Hatfield District
Party	Candidate	Votes	%	±%
Labour	David Kerr	3,684	56.76	
Conservative	Andrew Peffer	1,654	25.49	
Liberal Democrats	Gregory Beecroft	1,152	17.75	
Majority		2,030	31.27	
Turnout		6,490	78.37	

Welwyn Garden City West 1 May 1997 Welwyn Hatfield District
Party	Candidate	Votes	%	±%
Labour	Michael Hobday	3,983	44.06	
Conservative	Kenneth Jackson	3,273	36.20	
Liberal Democrats	William Corbishley	1,785	19.74	
Majority		710	7.86	
Turnout		9,041	80.38	

== Changes 1997–2001 ==
A by-election was held in Hemel Hempstead South East division on 10 June 1999, triggered by the death of Labour councillor Philip Aldis in March 1999. The seat was won for the Conservatives by David Lloyd. The Conservatives then had 39 seats, giving them a majority on the council over the Labour and Liberal Democrat coalition. The Conservative leader, Robert Ellis, was formally confirmed as the new leader of the council at a meeting on 15 June 1999.
