= 1989 Ards Borough Council election =

Local government election in Northern Ireland

- 17 May 1989

All 20 seats to Ards Borough Council 11 seats needed for a majority
	First party	Second party	Third party
Party	UUP	DUP	Alliance
Seats won	8	7	4
Seat change	▲2	▼1	▲1
	Fourth party	Fifth party	Sixth party
Party	Ind. Unionist	NI Labour	UPUP
Seats won	1	0	0
Seat change	▲1	▼1	▼1
	Seventh party
Party	Independent
Seats won	0
Seat change	▼1

Elections to Ards Borough Council were held on 17 May 1989 on the same day as the other Northern Irish local government elections. The election used three district electoral areas to elect a total of 20 councillors.

== Election results ==
Ards Borough Council Election Result 1989
Party	Seats	Gains	Losses	Net gain/loss	Seats %	Votes %	Votes	+/−
UUP	8	2	0	▲2	40.0	41.3	7,926	▲10.8
DUP	7	0	1	▼1	35.0	32.2	6,187	▼7.1
Alliance	4	1	0	▲1	20.0	18.8	3,610	▲6.4
Ind. Unionist	1	1	0	▲1	5.0	4.7	907	▲4.7
Independent	0	0	1	▼1	0.0	2.9	564	▼1.2

Note: "Votes" are the first preference votes.

== Districts summary ==
Results of the Ards Borough Council election, 1989 by district
Ward	%	Cllrs	%	Cllrs	%	Cllrs	%	Cllrs	Total Cllrs
Ward	UUP		DUP		Alliance		Others		Total Cllrs
Ards Peninsula	38.3	3	30.0	2	23.6	2	8.1	0	7
Ards West	54.5	3	27.8	2	17.6	1	0.0	0	6
Newtownards	32.1	2	38.9	3	14.7	1	14.3	1	7
Total	41.3	8	32.2	7	18.8	4	7.7	1	20

== Districts results ==
=== Ards Peninsula ===
1985: 2 x UUP, 2 x DUP, 1 x Alliance, 1 x UPUP, 1 x Independent
1989: 3 x UUP, 2 x DUP, 2 x Alliance
1985-1989 Change: UUP and Alliance gain from UPUP and Independent

Ards Peninsula - 7 seats
Party	Candidate	FPv%	Count							
Party	Candidate	FPv%	1	2	3	4	5	6	7	8
Alliance	Kieran McCarthy*	16.19%	1,119							
DUP	Jim Shannon*	14.90%	1,030							
UUP	John Shields*	14.73%	1,018							
UUP	Robert Ambrose*	14.59%	1,008							
DUP	Mervyn Rea	8.45%	584	588.56	682.4	705.49	738.45	748.8	1,139.8	
UUP	Ronald Ferguson	6.64%	459	464.52	474.21	586.38	688.3	786.85	845.31	983.31
Alliance	Clifford Auld	7.41%	512	698	705.48	717.3	726.1	742	753.72	765.72
Independent	James McMullan	8.16%	564	616.32	616.83	616.83	617.95	619	624.15	632.15
DUP	Oliver Johnston*	6.54%	452	453.44	502.4	511.57	519.09	531.84		
UUP	Trevor Hussey	2.39%	165	167.4	172.5					
Electorate: 16,006 Valid: 6,911 (43.18%) Spoilt: 229 Quota: 864 Turnout: 7,140 (44.61%)

=== Ards West ===
1985: 3 x DUP, 2 x UUP, 1 x Alliance
1989: 3 x UUP, 2 x DUP, 1 x Alliance
1985-1989 Change: UUP gain from DUP

Ards West - 6 seats
Party	Candidate	FPv%	Count					
Party	Candidate	FPv%	1	2	3	4	5	6
UUP	Robert Gibson*	23.16%	1,375					
UUP	Edward Archdale	13.73%	815	930.05				
UUP	Bobby McBride*	13.02%	773	856.46				
DUP	David McKibbin	10.43%	619	698.17	702.09	759.48	887.48	
Alliance	Jim McBriar*	11.12%	660	692.37	696.57	700.57	706.8	1,072.8
DUP	John Hamilton*	10.97%	651	684.15	689.47	727.47	817.61	822.78
UUP	William Elliott	4.60%	273	427.05	488.37	497.65	515	530.07
Alliance	Alan McDowell	6.52%	387	393.24	394.08	400.08	402.08	
DUP	Glynn Moore	3.20%	190	205.21	207.45	268.12		
DUP	Andrew Marks	3.27%	194	195.17	196.01			
Electorate: 13,303 Valid: 5,937 (44.63%) Spoilt: 136 Quota: 849 Turnout: 6,073 (45.65%)

=== Newtownards ===
1985: 3 x DUP, 2 x UUP, 1 x Alliance, 1 x NILP
1989: 3 x DUP, 2 x UUP, 1 x Alliance, 1 x Independent Unionist
1985-1989 Change: Independent Unionist gain from NILP

Newtownards - 7 seats
Party	Candidate	FPv%	Count								
Party	Candidate	FPv%	1	2	3	4	5	6	7	8	9
UUP	Thomas Benson*	20.60%	1,307								
DUP	Simpson Gibson*	20.22%	1,283								
Alliance	Owen Dorrian*	11.33%	719	757	763.08	770.08	964.08				
DUP	Wilbert Magill	8.64%	548	565.6	679.98	686.38	686.38	687.38	799.54		
DUP	John Elliott*	6.43%	408	450.4	625.2	633.1	633.48	634.48	785.14	906.14	
UUP	David Smyth*	7.12%	452	544	565.66	625.38	628.18	671.18	699.68	794.68	
Ind. Unionist	John Purdy	7.45%	473	485.4	496.04	503.22	511.82	578.82	585.74	682.36	697.36
UUP	Thomas Hamilton	2.88%	183	430.6	449.22	482.58	489.58	525.58	535.06	603.58	636.58
Ind. Unionist	William Hannigan	6.84%	434	449.6	473.92	478.72	481.12	490.12	504.1		
DUP	Cedric Wilson	3.59%	228	236.4	339.38	340.18	342.58	343.58			
Alliance	Laurence Thompson	3.36%	213	218.2	218.58	221.58					
UUP	James McKernon	1.54%	98	130.8	136.12						
Electorate: 16,907 Valid: 6,346 (37.53%) Spoilt: 175 Quota: 794 Turnout: 6,521 (38.57%)
