= 1989 Hertfordshire County Council election =

Local election in England

- 4 May 1989

All 77 seats to Hertfordshire County Council 39 seats needed for a majority
- Registered: 744,952 (▲2.0%)
- Turnout: 41.3% (▼4.0%)

	First party	Second party	Third party
Party	Conservative	Labour	SLD
Seats won	45	27	5
Seat change	▲9	Steady	▼9
Popular vote	135,764	101,681	58,010
Percentage	44.1%	33.1%	18.9%
Swing	▲6.5%	▲4.1%	▼13.2%
Council control before election
No overall control
Council control after election
Conservative

The 1989 Hertfordshire County Council election took place on 4 May 1989 to elect members of Hertfordshire County Council in Hertfordshire, England. This was on the same day as other local elections.

At the election, the Conservatives gained control of the council from No overall control.

== Summary ==
=== Election result ===
1989 Hertfordshire County Council election
Party	Candidates	Seats	Gains	Losses	Net gain/loss	Seats %	Votes %	Votes	+/−
Conservative	77	45	10	1	▲9	58.4	44.1	135,764	+6.5
Labour	77	27	2	2	Steady	35.1	33.1	101,681	+4.1
SLD	73	5	0	9	▼9	6.5	18.9	58,010	–13.2
SDP	20	0	0	0	Steady	0.0	2.0	6,287	N/A
Residents	3	0	0	0	Steady	0.0	1.1	3,265	+0.1
Green	7	0	0	0	Steady	0.0	0.7	2,057	+0.4
Independent	1	0	0	0	Steady	0.0	0.1	396	+0.1
National Front	1	0	0	0	Steady	0.0	<0.1	77	N/A

== Division results by local authority ==
=== Broxbourne ===
Broxbourne District Summary
Party	Seats	+/-	Votes	%	+/-
Conservative	6	Steady	10,464	55.5	+8.3
Labour	0	Steady	5,522	29.3	+3.5
SLD	0	Steady	2,613	13.9	–12.9
SDP	0	Steady	242	1.3	N/A
Total	6	Steady	18,841	30.9	–4.7
Registered electors			61,030	–	+3.6

Division results

Cheshunt Central
Party	Candidate	Votes	%	±%
Conservative	J. Drew*	1,698	53.3	+7.7
Labour	J. Draper	1,164	36.5	–0.2
SLD	P. Huse	324	10.2	–7.5
Majority		534	16.8	+7.8
Turnout		3,186	34.4	–2.5
Registered electors		9,272		
Conservative hold		Swing	▲4.0	

Cheshunt North
Party	Candidate	Votes	%	±%
Conservative	B. Harlow	1,332	58.6	+9.6
Labour	S. Elliott	585	25.7	–3.3
SLD	C. Brown	357	15.7	–6.3
Majority		747	32.8	+12.9
Turnout		2,274	23.6	–7.2
Registered electors		9,632		
Conservative hold		Swing	▲6.5	

Cheshunt West
Party	Candidate	Votes	%	±%
Conservative	C. Tyler*	1,984	63.5	+15.0
Labour	J. Atkins	570	18.2	+0.4
SLD	R. Dubow	330	10.6	–23.1
SDP	D. Lefley	242	7.7	N/A
Majority		1,414	45.2	+30.4
Turnout		3,126	28.5	–7.0
Registered electors		10,981		
Conservative hold		Swing	▲7.3	

Hoddesdon North
Party	Candidate	Votes	%	±%
Conservative	J. Rose*	1,770	55.9	+8.0
Labour	J. Garrett	928	29.3	+0.9
SLD	J. Gould	470	14.8	–8.9
Majority		842	26.6	+7.1
Turnout		3,168	33.3	–6.5
Registered electors		9,511		
Conservative hold		Swing	▲3.6	

Hoddesdon South
Party	Candidate	Votes	%	±%
Conservative	H. Bird	1,870	59.9	+10.6
SLD	T. Griffiths	785	25.2	–12.2
Labour	A. Bloomfield	466	14.9	+3.2
Majority		1,085	34.8	+22.9
Turnout		3,121	30.3	–7.8
Registered electors		10,297		
Conservative hold		Swing	▼6.9	

Waltham Cross
Party	Candidate	Votes	%	±%
Conservative	R. Quint	1,810	45.6	+2.8
Labour	M. Hudson	1,809	45.6	+12.6
SLD	P. Seeby	347	8.7	–15.5
Majority		1	0.03	–9.9
Turnout		3,966	35.0	+2.1
Registered electors		11,337		
Conservative hold		Swing	▼4.9	

=== Dacorum ===
Dacorum District Summary
Party	Seats	+/-	Votes	%	+/-
Conservative	7	▲1	18,190	43.7	+6.7
Labour	3	Steady	13,803	33.2	+0.8
SLD	0	▼1	5,645	13.6	–16.4
SDP	0	Steady	3,289	7.9	N/A
Green	0	Steady	623	1.5	+1.2
National Front	0	Steady	77	0.2	N/A
Total	10	Steady	41,627	40.8	–4.2
Registered electors			102,000	–	+1.8

Division results

Berkhamsted
Party	Candidate	Votes	%	±%
Conservative	H. Rost*	2,127	46.1	+1.3
SLD	S. Sharpe	1,236	26.8	–5.7
Labour	D. Freeman	974	21.1	–1.6
SDP	S. Taylor	275	6.0	N/A
Majority		891	19.3	+7.1
Turnout		4,612	38.3	–3.8
Registered electors		12,038		
Conservative hold		Swing	▲3.5	

Bridgewater
Party	Candidate	Votes	%	±%
Conservative	F. Seely*	2,034	65.8	+6.7
Labour	K. Short	506	16.4	+1.5
SLD	I. McCalla	369	11.9	–14.1
SDP	J. Taylor	184	5.9	N/A
Majority		1,528	49.4	+16.3
Turnout		3,093	37.9	–4.2
Registered electors		8,156		
Conservative hold		Swing	▲2.6	

Hemel Hempstead East
Party	Candidate	Votes	%	±%
Conservative	R. Hamilton	2,113	47.7	+12.2
Labour	S. Harrison	1,352	30.5	–1.2
SLD	A. Winter	643	14.5	–18.3
SDP	E. Baker	319	7.2	N/A
Majority		761	17.2	+14.4
Turnout		4,427	48.4	–1.1
Registered electors		9,150		
Conservative hold		Swing	▲6.7	

Hemel Hempstead North East
Party	Candidate	Votes	%	±%
Conservative	S. Sullivan	1,215	34.9	+4.4
Labour	I. Laidlaw-Dickson	1,156	33.2	–1.4
SDP	W. Evans*	682	19.6	N/A
SLD	J. Blackman	426	12.2	–22.7
Majority		59	1.7	N/A
Turnout		3,479	32.9	–8.2
Registered electors		10,565		
Conservative gain from SLD		Swing	▲2.9	

Hemel Hempstead North West
Party	Candidate	Votes	%	±%
Labour	D. Moss*	2,332	50.0	+0.8
Conservative	A. Williams	1,275	27.4	+5.0
SDP	R. Eminson	560	12.0	N/A
SLD	E. Willis	416	8.9	–19.5
National Front	J. McAuley	77	1.7	N/A
Majority		1,057	22.7	+2.0
Turnout		4,660	45.3	–3.3
Registered electors		10,298		
Labour hold		Swing	▼2.1	

Hemel Hempstead South East
Party	Candidate	Votes	%	±%
Labour	R. Thorpe-Tracey*	2,159	48.0	+1.8
Conservative	M. Griffiths	1,667	37.0	+11.0
SLD	G. Lawrence	370	8.2	–19.6
SDP	D. Coburn	306	6.8	N/A
Majority		492	10.9	–7.4
Turnout		4,502	40.4	–4.5
Registered electors		11,133		
Labour hold		Swing	▼4.6	

Hemel Hempstead St Pauls
Party	Candidate	Votes	%	±%
Labour	P. Doyle	2,086	58.3	+7.9
Conservative	K. Birtchnell	907	25.3	+7.8
SLD	R. Hollinghurst	298	8.3	–23.8
SDP	D. Coburn	288	8.0	N/A
Majority		1,179	32.9	+14.6
Turnout		3,579	41.6	–4.5
Registered electors		8,597		
Labour hold		Swing	▲0.1	

Hemel Hempstead Town
Party	Candidate	Votes	%	±%
Conservative	C. Everall*	2,410	51.6	+6.3
Labour	R. Barson	1,475	31.6	+1.6
SDP	W. Lear	432	9.2	N/A
SLD	C. Gudgeon	358	7.7	–15.1
Majority		935	20.0	+4.7
Turnout		4,675	39.6	–4.9
Registered electors		11,813		
Conservative hold		Swing	▲2.4	

Kings Langley
Party	Candidate	Votes	%	±%
Conservative	A. Anderson*	1,744	49.6	+4.2
Labour	S. Cox	1,049	29.9	+11.3
SLD	S. Bowles	598	17.0	–19.0
SDP	I. Rambotas	123	3.5	N/A
Majority		695	19.8	+10.5
Turnout		3,514	40.1	–7.7
Registered electors		8,765		
Conservative hold		Swing	▼3.5	

Tring
Party	Candidate	Votes	%	±%
Conservative	H. Marwood*	2,698	53.0	+6.1
SLD	E. Williams	931	18.3	–10.1
Labour	M. Jenner	714	14.0	–7.5
Green	A. Hunt	623	12.2	+9.0
SDP	R. Muller	120	2.4	N/A
Majority		1,767	34.7	+16.1
Turnout		5,086	44.3	–0.5
Registered electors		11,485		
Conservative hold		Swing	▲8.1	

=== East Hertfordshire ===
East Hertfordshire District Summary
Party	Seats	+/-	Votes	%	+/-
Conservative	8	▲2	18,525	50.0	+9.3
Labour	1	Steady	7,401	20.0	+2.3
SLD	0	▼2	8,543	23.1	–12.8
Residents	0	Steady	1,729	4.7	+0.2
Green	0	Steady	829	2.2	+1.0
Total	9	Steady	37,027	41.5	–2.7
Registered electors			89,141	–	+4.9

Division results

All Saints
Party	Candidate	Votes	%	±%
Conservative	H. Banks	1,678	41.7	+0.4
SLD	E. Banks	1,173	29.2	–3.6
Labour	J. Findlay	860	21.4	–2.1
Green	B. Cheal	309	7.7	+5.3
Majority		505	12.6	+4.2
Turnout		4,020	45.9	–1.4
Registered electors		8,751		
Conservative hold		Swing	▲2.0	

Bishops Stortford Central Parsonag
Party	Candidate	Votes	%	±%
Conservative	D. Oldland	1,435	39.6	+17.4
Residents	V. Ellison	799	22.1	–5.3
SLD	A. Graham	795	21.9	–11.4
Labour	E. Egginton	593	16.4	–0.6
Majority		636	17.6	N/A
Turnout		3,622	34.3	–4.6
Registered electors		10,552		
Conservative gain from SLD		Swing	▲11.4	

Bishops Stortford Chantry Thorley
Party	Candidate	Votes	%	±%
Conservative	J. Fielder*	2,022	53.0	+13.6
Residents	J. Guntrip	930	24.4	+7.9
SLD	P. Wybrew	479	12.6	–23.3
Labour	T. Coldwell	385	10.1	+1.9
Majority		1,092	28.6	+25.1
Turnout		3,816	36.4	–7.4
Registered electors		10,480		
Conservative hold		Swing	▲3.0	

Baughing
Party	Candidate	Votes	%	±%
Conservative	J. Pitman*	2,474	64.4	+19.0
Labour	P. Shepherd	696	18.1	+5.0
SLD	C. Pehrson	674	17.5	–24.0
Majority		1,778	46.3	+42.5
Turnout		3,844	42.2	–1.5
Registered electors		9,119		
Conservative hold		Swing	▲7.0	

Hertford Rural
Party	Candidate	Votes	%	±%
Conservative	R. Tucker	2,555	60.1	+5.1
Labour	H. Hodgson	855	20.1	–0.3
SLD	L. Wilson	535	12.6	–12.0
Green	M. Whitear	304	7.2	N/A
Majority		1,700	40.0	+9.7
Turnout		4,249	41.8	–4.7
Registered electors		10,159		
Conservative hold		Swing	▲2.7	

Sawbridgeworth
Party	Candidate	Votes	%	±%
Conservative	B. Smalley*	2,494	57.1	+8.3
SLD	W. Powell	1,217	27.9	–11.8
Labour	S. Peaple	657	15.0	+5.4
Majority		1,277	29.2	+20.1
Turnout		4,368	42.2	+0.9
Registered electors		10,360		
Conservative hold		Swing	▲10.1	

St Andrews
Party	Candidate	Votes	%	±%
Labour	G. Perrett*	1,911	48.5	+11.0
Conservative	N. Edey	1,436	36.4	+2.4
SLD	S. Knott	381	9.7	–17.2
Green	B. Cheal	216	5.5	+4.0
Majority		475	12.0	+8.5
Turnout		3,944	45.2	+0.7
Registered electors		8,734		
Labour hold		Swing	▲4.3	

Ware North
Party	Candidate	Votes	%	±%
Conservative	P. Dye	2,287	44.2	+10.7
SLD	M. Coleman*	2,194	42.4	–10.3
Labour	G. Page	693	13.4	+1.8
Majority		93	1.8	N/A
Turnout		5,174	47.3	–2.6
Registered electors		10,936		
Conservative gain from SLD		Swing	▲10.5	

Ware South
Party	Candidate	Votes	%	±%
Conservative	D. Palmer	2,144	53.7	+7.9
SLD	J. Wing	1,095	27.4	–3.3
Labour	M. Evans	751	18.8	–1.9
Majority		1,049	26.3	+11.2
Turnout		3,990	39.7	–1.5
Registered electors		10,050		
Conservative hold		Swing	▲5.6	

=== Hertsmere ===
Hertsmere District Summary
Party	Seats	+/-	Votes	%	+/-
Conservative	4	Steady	11,911	48.4	+5.9
Labour	2	Steady	8,155	33.2	+6.8
SLD	1	Steady	3,261	13.3	–18.0
SDP	0	Steady	870	3.5	N/A
Independent	0	Steady	396	1.6	N/A
Total	7	Steady	24,593	36.3	–7.3
Registered electors			67,806	–	+3.8

Division results

Bushey Heath
Party	Candidate	Votes	%	±%
Conservative	J. Hudson*	1,627	59.6	+7.6
SLD	M. Colne	750	27.5	–10.1
Labour	D. Bearfield	353	12.9	+2.5
Majority		877	32.1	+17.7
Turnout		2,730	35.3	–4.9
Registered electors		7,733		
Conservative hold		Swing	▲8.9	

Bushey North
Party	Candidate	Votes	%	±%
SLD	M. Colne*	2,359	57.6	–2.0
Conservative	B. Flashman	1,369	33.4	+5.9
Labour	S. Mercado	370	9.0	–3.8
Majority		990	24.2	–7.9
Turnout		4,098	40.7	–12.8
Registered electors		10,068		
SLD hold		Swing	▼4.0	

Elstree
Party	Candidate	Votes	%	±%
Labour	B. York*	2,189	50.0	+8.7
Conservative	D. Chettleburgh	1,782	40.7	–0.2
SDP	M. Kirsh	259	5.9	N/A
SLD	R. Kutchinsky	152	3.5	–14.4
Majority		407	9.3	+8.9
Turnout		4,382	41.3	–3.7
Registered electors		10,598		
Labour hold		Swing	▲4.5	

Lyndhurst
Party	Candidate	Votes	%	±%
Labour	K. Metcalf*	2,125	66.7	+6.1
Conservative	A. Savage	757	23.8	+2.8
SDP	W. Morgan	303	9.5	N/A
Majority		1,368	43.0	+3.4
Turnout		3,185	30.1	–5.7
Registered electors		10,575		
Labour hold		Swing	▲1.7	

Potters Bar North East
Party	Candidate	Votes	%	±%
Conservative	A. Gray	1,894	72.8	+10.4
Labour	P. Bradbury	709	27.2	+12.1
Majority		1,185	45.5	+5.5
Turnout		2,603	30.9	–9.1
Registered electors		8,428		
Conservative hold		Swing	▼0.9	

Potters Bar South West
Party	Candidate	Votes	%	±%
Conservative	R. Fielding*	2,168	63.8	+9.7
Labour	J. Bradbury	1,228	36.2	+18.2
Majority		940	27.7	+1.5
Turnout		3,396	34.8	–4.5
Registered electors		9,751		
Conservative hold		Swing	▼4.3	

Watling
Party	Candidate	Votes	%	±%
Conservative	H. Saunders*	2,314	55.1	+8.2
Labour	P. Coleman	1,181	28.1	+1.7
Independent	A. Mallach	396	9.4	N/A
SDP	R. Brown	308	7.3	N/A
Majority		1,133	27.0	+6.8
Turnout		4,199	39.4	–9.7
Registered electors		10,653		
Conservative hold		Swing	▲3.3	

=== North Hertfordshire ===
North Hertfordshire District Summary
Party	Seats	+/-	Votes	%	+/-
Conservative	6	▲3	17,001	44.6	+7.6
Labour	3	▼1	12,556	32.9	+4.8
SLD	0	▼2	5,475	14.4	–16.8
Residents	0	Steady	1,536	4.0	+0.3
SDP	0	Steady	1,458	3.8	N/A
Green	0	Steady	123	0.3	N/A
Total	9	Steady	38,149	44.8	–6.2
Registered electors			85,100	–	+2.7

Division results

Hitchin North East
Party	Candidate	Votes	%	±%
Labour	F. Peacock*	2,107	43.3	+6.3
Residents	K. Logan	1,536	31.6	+3.2
Conservative	W. Charlton-Wright	771	15.9	–7.3
SLD	P. Clark	229	4.7	–6.7
Green	C. Hanna	123	2.5	N/A
SDP	M. Randall	95	2.0	N/A
Majority		571	11.7	+3.1
Turnout		4,861	46.2	–6.4
Registered electors		10,513		
Labour hold		Swing	▲5.3	

Hitchin South
Party	Candidate	Votes	%	±%
Conservative	D. Ashley*	1,875	55.1	+4.6
Labour	S. Tendeter	612	18.0	+6.3
SLD	R. Canning	525	15.4	–22.3
SDP	V. Taylor	391	11.5	N/A
Majority		1,263	37.1	+24.3
Turnout		3,403	43.7	–5.5
Registered electors		7,780		
Conservative hold		Swing	▼1.7	

Knebworth & Codicote
Party	Candidate	Votes	%	±%
Conservative	R. Ellis	2,344	61.7	+11.1
Labour	C. Brindle	877	23.1	+3.0
SLD	J. Heath	581	15.3	–14.0
Majority		1,467	38.6	+17.2
Turnout		3,802	42.5	–2.5
Registered electors		8,946		
Conservative hold		Swing	▲4.1	

Letchworth East & Baldock
Party	Candidate	Votes	%	±%
Conservative	V. Crellin	2,244	45.4	+15.7
Labour	W. Bifield	2,124	42.9	+0.1
SLD	R. Sprigge	320	6.5	–21.1
SDP	G. Wellfare	260	5.3	N/A
Majority		30	2.4	N/A
Turnout		5,038	44.0	–5.5
Registered electors		11,253		
Conservative gain from Labour		Swing	▲7.8	

Letchworth North West
Party	Candidate	Votes	%	±%
Labour	M. Kearns*	2,184	57.8	+13.2
Conservative	D. Murphy	1,136	30.1	+2.6
SLD	R. Streeter	458	12.1	–15.8
Majority		1,048	27.7	+11.0
Turnout		3,778	41.1	–10.0
Registered electors		9,193		
Labour hold		Swing	▼5.3	

Letchworth South
Party	Candidate	Votes	%	±%
Conservative	A. Burrows	2,563	49.0	+16.0
Labour	N. Horwood	1,214	23.2	+3.3
SLD	S. Tustin	972	18.6	–28.5
SDP	R. Ashton	483	9.2	N/A
Majority		1,349	25.8	N/A
Turnout		5,232	49.7	–9.3
Registered electors		10,529		
Conservative gain from SLD		Swing	▲6.4	

North Herts Rural
Party	Candidate	Votes	%	±%
Conservative	B. Goble*	2,233	61.3	+4.0
Labour	R. Leete	758	20.8	+3.3
SLD	S. Jarvis	651	17.9	–7.3
Majority		1,475	40.5	+8.3
Turnout		3,642	48.3	+0.6
Registered electors		7,548		
Conservative hold		Swing	▲0.4	

Offa
Party	Candidate	Votes	%	±%
Labour	D. Billing*	1,860	48.3	+5.8
Conservative	F. Howett	1,445	37.5	+6.8
SLD	J. Sefton	548	14.2	–12.6
Majority		415	10.8	–1.0
Turnout		3,853	42.8	–2.7
Registered electors		9,004		
Labour hold		Swing	▼0.5	

Royston
Party	Candidate	Votes	%	±%
Conservative	L. Doyle	2,390	51.6	+8.5
SLD	P. Kennington*	1,191	25.7	–18.4
Labour	R. King	820	17.7	+4.9
SDP	M. Harrison	229	4.9	N/A
Majority		1,199	25.9	N/A
Turnout		4,630	44.8	–12.2
Registered electors		10,334		
Conservative gain from SLD		Swing	▲13.5	

=== St Albans ===
St Albans District Summary
Party	Seats	+/-	Votes	%	+/-
Conservative	5	Steady	19,125	43.0	+2.8
SLD	3	▼1	14,339	32.2	–8.0
Labour	2	▲1	11,026	24.8	+5.9
Total	10	Steady	44,490	46.7	–3.8
Registered electors			95,220	–	+1.5

Division results

Harpenden North East
Party	Candidate	Votes	%	±%
Conservative	J. Hudson*	2,672	55.2	+9.6
SLD	C. Canfield	1,396	28.8	–12.5
Labour	B. Saffery	773	16.0	+5.1
Majority		1,276	26.4	+22.1
Turnout		4,841	44.7	–8.7
Registered electors		10,824		
Conservative hold		Swing	▲11.1	

Harpenden South West
Party	Candidate	Votes	%	±%
Conservative	I. Tarry*	2,731	65.8	+8.3
SLD	G. Willey	867	20.9	–12.7
Labour	D. Crew	555	13.4	+6.5
Majority		1,864	44.9	+21.1
Turnout		4,153	41.3	–7.1
Registered electors		10,059		
Conservative hold		Swing	▲10.5	

Sandridge
Party	Candidate	Votes	%	±%
Conservative	K. Haywood	1,723	45.7	+3.4
SLD	P. Halpin	1,566	41.5	–5.6
Labour	J. Bellchambers	485	12.9	+3.8
Majority		157	4.2	–0.6
Turnout		3,774	43.6	–4.3
Registered electors		8,652		
Conservative gain from SLD		Swing	▲4.5	

St Albans Central
Party	Candidate	Votes	%	±%
SLD	G. Tattersfield*	1,696	40.5	+0.5
Conservative	D. Adkins	1,328	31.7	–2.7
Labour	C. Donovan	1,162	27.8	+2.2
Majority		368	8.8	+3.3
Turnout		4,186	47.3	–5.6
Registered electors		8,853		
SLD hold		Swing	▲1.8	

St Albans East
Party	Candidate	Votes	%	±%
SLD	C. Gunner	2,199	46.5	–4.2
Conservative	C. Ellis	1,443	30.5	–1.4
Labour	C. Hayward	1,088	23.0	+5.7
Majority		756	16.0	–2.8
Turnout		4,730	47.9	–3.8
Registered electors		9,866		
SLD hold		Swing	▼1.4	

St Albans North
Party	Candidate	Votes	%	±%
Conservative	A. Hill*	1,987	38.1	–0.9
Labour	D. Allan	1,617	31.0	+8.1
SLD	R. Biddle	1,607	30.8	–7.3
Majority		370	7.1	+6.1
Turnout		5,211	53.3	+0.2
Registered electors		9,780		
Conservative hold		Swing	▼4.5	

St Albans Rural
Party	Candidate	Votes	%	±%
Conservative	R. Scranage*	2,196	49.2	+4.4
SLD	P. King	1,729	38.7	–3.0
Labour	K. Holmes	538	12.1	+0.1
Majority		467	10.5	+7.4
Turnout		4,463	49.2	+0.7
Registered electors		9,077		
Conservative hold		Swing	▲3.7	

St Albans South
Party	Candidate	Votes	%	±%
Labour	Kerry Pollard	2,204	44.8	+12.9
Conservative	R. Durrant*	1,918	39.0	–0.1
SLD	J. Allen	793	16.1	–12.9
Majority		286	5.8	N/A
Turnout		4,915	49.8	–2.9
Registered electors		9,876		
Labour gain from Conservative		Swing	▲6.5	

St Stephens
Party	Candidate	Votes	%	±%
SLD	M. Moore*	1,960	44.2	–8.3
Conservative	A. Nowell	1,954	44.0	+7.7
Labour	C. Leet	523	11.8	+0.6
Majority		6	0.1	–16.1
Turnout		4,437	44.4	–3.1
Registered electors		9,995		
SLD hold		Swing	▼8.0	

The Colneys
Party	Candidate	Votes	%	±%
Labour	M. Macmillan*	2,081	55.1	+11.3
Conservative	H. Haynes	1,173	31.0	+2.5
SLD	N. Wrigley	526	13.9	–13.8
Majority		908	24.0	+8.8
Turnout		3,780	45.9	–2.6
Registered electors		8,238		
Labour hold		Swing	▲8.8	

=== Stevenage ===
Stevenage District Summary
Party	Seats	+/-	Votes	%	+/-
Labour	6	▲1	11,729	56.8	+9.4
Conservative	0	Steady	5,511	26.7	+6.5
SLD	0	▼1	3,171	15.3	–17.0
Green	0	Steady	256	1.2	N/A
Total	6	Steady	20,667	36.5	–5.4
Registered electors			56,602	–	+1.5

Division results

Bedwell
Party	Candidate	Votes	%	±%
Labour	B. Underwood	2,258	67.5	+7.3
Conservative	C. Aylin	741	22.1	+3.3
SLD	R. Baskerville	348	10.4	–10.6
Majority		1,517	45.3	+6.1
Turnout		3,347	37.4	–4.5
Registered electors		8,956		
Labour hold		Swing	▲2.0	

Broadwater
Party	Candidate	Votes	%	±%
Labour	M. Warren	2,045	57.1	+14.8
Conservative	A. Finch	826	23.1	+5.2
SLD	K. Taylor	712	19.9	–19.8
Majority		1,219	34.0	+31.4
Turnout		3,583	39.0	–7.6
Registered electors		9,181		
Labour hold		Swing	▲4.8	

Chells
Party	Candidate	Votes	%	±%
Labour	A. Campbell	1,621	60.6	+10.0
Conservative	K. Murray	589	22.0	+2.7
SLD	B. Clark	466	17.4	–12.7
Majority		1,032	38.6	+18.1
Turnout		2,676	33.8	–4.5
Registered electors		7,928		
Labour hold		Swing	▲3.7	

Old Stevenage
Party	Candidate	Votes	%	±%
Labour	R. Clark	2,071	47.3	+5.8
Conservative	J. Halling	1,750	39.9	+7.5
SLD	A. Christy	561	12.8	–13.4
Majority		321	7.3	–1.8
Turnout		4,382	41.5	–2.1
Registered electors		10,569		
Labour hold		Swing	▼0.9	

Shephall
Party	Candidate	Votes	%	±%
Labour	S. Munden*	2,132	68.9	+9.5
Conservative	L. Jordan	612	19.8	+4.4
SLD	G. Wren	350	11.3	–13.9
Majority		1,520	49.1	+14.9
Turnout		3,094	32.9	–1.8
Registered electors		9,397		
Labour hold		Swing	▲2.6	

St Nicholas
Party	Candidate	Votes	%	±%
Labour	P. Alexander	1,602	44.7	+7.8
Conservative	S. Woods	993	27.7	+12.9
SLD	C. Lewis	734	20.5	–27.8
Green	M. Fowler	256	7.1	N/A
Majority		609	17.0	N/A
Turnout		3,585	33.9	–11.2
Registered electors		10,571		
Labour gain from SLD		Swing	▼2.6	

=== Three Rivers ===
Three Rivers District Summary
Party	Seats	+/-	Votes	%	+/-
Conservative	5	▲2	14,516	51.0	+9.9
SLD	1	▼2	8,346	29.4	–12.1
Labour	1	Steady	5,574	19.6	+2.2
Total	7	Steady	28,436	42.2	–3.7
Registered electors			67,331	–	–0.7

Division results

Abbotts Langley
Party	Candidate	Votes	%	±%
SLD	P. Goggins	2,046	36.6	–4.1
Conservative	M. Parsons	1,876	33.5	+0.8
Labour	D. Meek	1,673	29.9	+3.3
Majority		170	3.0	–5.1
Turnout		5,595	45.2	–4.0
Registered electors		12,385		
SLD hold		Swing	▼2.5	

Chorleywood
Party	Candidate	Votes	%	±%
Conservative	F. Cogan*	2,132	56.6	+5.7
SLD	L. Bond	1,395	37.0	–2.9
Labour	M. Hilmi	241	6.4	–2.8
Majority		737	19.6	+8.6
Turnout		3,768	43.2	–4.3
Registered electors		8,715		
Conservative hold		Swing	▲4.3	

Croxley
Party	Candidate	Votes	%	±%
Conservative	F. Williams	1,755	43.8	+10.2
SLD	T. Ambrose	1,731	43.2	–9.6
Labour	N. Crump	519	13.0	–0.7
Majority		24	0.6	N/A
Turnout		4,005	47.4	–0.1
Registered electors		8,449		
Conservative gain from SLD		Swing	▲9.9	

North Mymms
Party	Candidate	Votes	%	±%
Conservative	R. Johnson	2,591	78.4	+9.3
SLD	W. Parkinson	426	12.9	–10.1
Labour	A. Tinsley	287	8.7	+0.8
Majority		2,165	65.5	+19.5
Turnout		3,304	39.3	–5.6
Registered electors		8,400		
Conservative hold		Swing	▲9.7	

Oxhey Park
Party	Candidate	Votes	%	±%
Conservative	W. Buckland	2,661	67.8	+16.4
SLD	A. Bannister	882	22.5	–26.1
Labour	D. Lake	379	9.7	N/A
Majority		1,779	45.4	+42.5
Turnout		3,922	41.2	–2.4
Registered electors		9,529		
Conservative hold		Swing	▲21.3	

Rickmansworth
Party	Candidate	Votes	%	±%
Conservative	G. Button	2,786	55.6	+20.6
SLD	E. Waller	1,542	30.8	–23.5
Labour	N. Doggett	679	13.6	+2.9
Majority		1,244	24.8	N/A
Turnout		5,007	47.6	–1.6
Registered electors		10,526		
Conservative gain from SLD		Swing	▲22.1	

South Oxhey
Party	Candidate	Votes	%	±%
Labour	D. Waddington*	1,796	63.4	+3.9
Conservative	N. Woodhouse	715	25.2	+7.6
SLD	J. Maher	324	11.4	–11.5
Majority		1,081	38.1	+1.4
Turnout		2,835	30.4	–5.6
Registered electors		9,327		
Labour hold		Swing	▼1.9	

=== Watford ===
Watford District Summary
Party	Seats	+/-	Votes	%	+/-
Labour	4	▼1	10,978	48.0	+5.3
Conservative	2	▲1	8,714	38.1	+4.4
SLD	0	Steady	3,189	13.9	–9.3
Total	6	Steady	22,881	40.4	–0.8
Registered electors			56,633	–	±0.0

Division results

Callowland Leggatts
Party	Candidate	Votes	%	±%
Labour	E. McNally	1,912	65.8	+4.2
Conservative	J. Pike	702	24.2	+3.9
SLD	K. Waddup	292	10.0	–8.1
Majority		1,210	41.6	+0.3
Turnout		2,906	35.0	–1.7
Registered electors		8,293		
Labour hold		Swing	▲0.2	

Central Oxhey
Party	Candidate	Votes	%	±%
Conservative	J. Price	1,695	41.6	+5.5
Labour	A. Ramsden*	1,672	41.0	+0.4
SLD	E. Pitkin	709	17.4	–5.9
Majority		23	0.6	N/A
Turnout		4,076	43.3	±0.0
Registered electors		9,415		
Conservative gain from Labour		Swing	▲2.6	

Meriden Tudor
Party	Candidate	Votes	%	±%
Labour	R. Fricker*	2,265	53.7	+7.0
Conservative	I. Dunn	1,483	35.2	+7.6
SLD	J. Richmond	471	11.2	–12.7
Majority		782	18.5	–0.6
Turnout		4,219	40.5	–1.9
Registered electors		10,421		
Labour hold		Swing	▼0.3	

Nascot Park
Party	Candidate	Votes	%	±%
Conservative	R. Gordon	2,353	63.3	+6.2
SLD	P. Jenkins	793	21.3	–8.8
Labour	T. Meldrum	574	15.4	+2.6
Majority		1,560	41.9	+14.9
Turnout		3,720	40.8	–7.9
Registered electors		9,114		
Conservative hold		Swing	▲7.5	

Vicarage Holywell
Party	Candidate	Votes	%	±%
Labour	S. Meldrum*	2,064	59.7	+3.1
Conservative	J. Doherty	1,002	29.0	+1.7
SLD	M. Baird	389	11.3	–4.9
Majority		1,062	30.7	–1.4
Turnout		3,455	35.6	+2.0
Registered electors		9,713		
Labour hold		Swing	▲0.7	

Woodside Stanborough
Party	Candidate	Votes	%	±%
Labour	D. Williams	2,491	55.3	+8.6
Conservative	S. Jones	1,479	32.8	+4.1
SLD	D. Scudder	535	11.9	–12.7
Majority		1,012	22.5	+4.4
Turnout		4,505	46.6	+3.7
Registered electors		9,677		
Labour hold		Swing	▲2.3	

=== Welwyn Hatfield ===
Welwyn Hatfield District Summary
Party	Seats	+/-	Votes	%	+/-
Labour	5	Steady	14,937	48.5	+2.1
Conservative	2	Steady	11,807	38.3	+5.5
SLD	0	Steady	3,428	11.1	–9.7
SDP	0	Steady	428	1.4	N/A
Green	0	Steady	226	0.7	N/A
Total	7	Steady	30,826	48.1	–0.1
Registered electors			64,089	–	±0.0

Division results

Haldens
Party	Candidate	Votes	%	±%
Labour	M. Nash	2,519	57.9	+1.3
Conservative	S. Hudson	1,212	27.9	+4.3
SLD	D. Cooke	393	9.0	–10.8
Green	D. Ashton	226	5.2	N/A
Majority		1,307	30.0	–3.0
Turnout		4,350	43.9	+0.7
Registered electors		9,907		
Labour hold		Swing	▼1.5	

Hatfield East
Party	Candidate	Votes	%	±%
Conservative	H. Burningham	2,061	54.5	+13.2
Labour	C. Longworth	1,263	33.4	–4.9
SLD	J. Monro	455	12.0	–8.4
Majority		798	21.1	+18.2
Turnout		3,779	45.5	+2.3
Registered electors		8,307		
Conservative hold		Swing	▲9.1	

Hatfield North
Party	Candidate	Votes	%	±%
Labour	S. Clark*	2,323	57.3	+8.8
Conservative	M. Carse	1,279	31.5	+1.5
SLD	L. Ferris	455	11.2	–10.3
Majority		1,044	25.7	+7.1
Turnout		4,057	46.2	–0.3
Registered electors		8,788		
Labour hold		Swing	▲3.7	

Hatfield South
Party	Candidate	Votes	%	±%
Labour	G. Wenham*	2,040	55.0	+6.5
Conservative	J. Scarff	1,292	34.9	+6.9
SLD	M. Richardson	374	10.1	–13.4
Majority		748	20.2	–0.3
Turnout		3,706	47.9	–1.7
Registered electors		7,732		
Labour hold		Swing	▼0.2	

Welwyn
Party	Candidate	Votes	%	±%
Conservative	M. Hall	2,469	58.4	+9.8
Labour	B. Dodge	1,170	27.7	+1.5
SLD	I. Skidmore	589	13.9	–11.3
Majority		1,299	30.7	+8.3
Turnout		4,228	45.9	–0.9
Registered electors		9,203		
Conservative hold		Swing	▲4.2	

Welwyn Garden City South
Party	Candidate	Votes	%	±%
Labour	D. Kerr	2,853	62.7	–8.6
Conservative	K. Jones	1,049	23.1	–5.6
SDP	J. Nichols	428	9.4	N/A
SLD	S. Porter	219	4.8	N/A
Majority		1,804	39.7	–2.9
Turnout		4,549	52.6	+8.6
Registered electors		8,651		
Labour hold		Swing	▼1.5	

Welwyn Garden City West
Party	Candidate	Votes	%	±%
Labour	R. Mays*	2,769	45.0	+4.4
Conservative	L. Stanbury	2,445	39.7	+10.2
SLD	C. Cory	943	15.3	–14.5
Majority		324	5.3	–5.5
Turnout		6,157	53.5	–3.2
Registered electors		11,501		
Labour hold		Swing	▼2.9	
