= 1989 South Glamorgan County Council election =

Local election in Wales

The fifth election to South Glamorgan County Council was held in May 1989. It was preceded by the 1985 election and followed by the 1993 election.

== Boundary changes ==
There were no boundary changes at this election.

== Candidates ==
Conservative and Labour candidates contested all seats. Following the break-up of the SDP-Liberal Alliance, most seats were contested by both the Social and Liberal Democrats and the continuing SDP. There were a smaller number of Plaid Cymru and Green Party candidates and a few Independents.

== Outcome ==
Labour retained control with an increased majority, by capturing a number of Conservative seats. A few other seats also changed hands. The Social and Liberal Democrats held all their seats bar one, but polled poorly elsewhere. (Note: The Social and Liberal Democrats are referred to as Liberal Democrats in the ward results)

A by-election was held on the same day in the Vale of Glamorgan constituency. This resulted in a much higher turnout than usual for local elections in wards which lay within the constituency. Labour captured the parliamentary seat from the Conservatives.

This table summarises the result of the elections in all wards. 62 councillors were elected.

1989 South Glamorgan County Council: elected members
| Party | Seats | Gains | Losses | Net gain/loss | Seats % | Votes % | Votes | +/− |
|---|---|---|---|---|---|---|---|---|
| Labour | 40 | 7 | 1 | +6 | | | | |
| Conservative | 18 | 0 | 5 | -5 | | | | |
| SLD | 7 | 2 | 1 | +1 | | | | |
| SDP | 1 | 0 | 2 | -2 | | | | |
| Plaid Cymru | 1 | 0 | 0 | 0 | | | | |

One of the Labour 'gains' was in Thornhill ward which the party had already won at a by-election.

== Ward Results ==
=== Adamsdown ===
Adamsdown 1989
| Party | Candidate | Votes | % | ±% |
|---|---|---|---|---|
| Labour | Kenneth Hutchings* | 1,522 | 77.0 | |
| Conservative | D. Munton | 180 | 19.0 | |
| Green | E. Proud | 134 | 6.8 | |
| SLD | Nigel Howells | 86 | 4.4 | |
| Plaid Cymru | Sian Edwards | 54 | 2.7 | |
| Majority | | | | |
| Turnout | | | 37.2 | |
| Labour hold | | Swing | | |

=== Baruc ===
Baruc 1989
| Party | Candidate | Votes | % | ±% |
|---|---|---|---|---|
| Conservative | J. Donovan | 1,367 | 44.6 | |
| Labour | F. Dobbs | 1,096 | 35.8 | |
| SLD | J. Tartaglia | 324 | 10.6 | |
| Plaid Cymru | E. Rees | 164 | 5.4 | |
| SDP | P. Hansen | 113 | 3.7 | |
| Majority | | | | |
| Turnout | | | 70.3 | |
| Conservative hold | | Swing | | |

=== Butetown ===
Butetown 1989
| Party | Candidate | Votes | % | ±% |
|---|---|---|---|---|
| Labour | W. Kitson* | 658 | 56.6 | |
| Independent | Ben Foday | 335 | 28.8 | |
| Conservative | A. Martin | 145 | 12.1 | |
| SLD | M. Mader | 24 | 2.1 | |
| Majority | | | | |
| Turnout | | | 52.7 | |
| Labour hold | | Swing | | |

=== Buttrills ===
Buttrills 1989
| Party | Candidate | Votes | % | ±% |
|---|---|---|---|---|
| Labour | B. Lane* | 1,907 | 65.5 | |
| Conservative | J. Connell | 815 | 28.0 | |
| SLD | J. Prangley | 190 | 6.5 | |
| Majority | | | | |
| Turnout | | | 69.5 | |
| Labour hold | | Swing | | |

=== Cadoc ===
Cadoc 1989
| Party | Candidate | Votes | % | ±% |
|---|---|---|---|---|
| Labour | S. James* | 2,341 | 67.1 | |
| Conservative | R. Barnes | 855 | 24.5 | |
| SLD | C. Southwell | 140 | 4.0 | |
| Plaid Cymru | M. Jeffries | 120 | 3.4 | |
| Communist | K. Stockdale | 33 | 0.9 | |
| Majority | | | | |
| Turnout | | | 62.7 | |
| Labour hold | | Swing | | |

=== Canton ===
Canton 1989
| Party | Candidate | Votes | % | ±% |
|---|---|---|---|---|
| Labour | Russell Goodway* | 1,212 | 55.6 | |
| Conservative | D. Mikelsons | 827 | 38.0 | |
| SLD | E. Williams | 140 | 6.4 | |
| Majority | | | | |
| Turnout | | | 46.0 | |
| Labour hold | | Swing | | |

=== Castleland ===
Castleland 1989
| Party | Candidate | Votes | % | ±% |
|---|---|---|---|---|
| Labour | M. Sharp* | 1,341 | 73.0 | |
| Conservative | J. Bounds | 364 | 18.6 | |
| SLD | M. Yandall | 72 | 3.7 | |
| SDP | A. Williams | 57 | 2.9 | |
| Communist | M. Wallis | 35 | 1.8 | |
| Majority | | | | |
| Turnout | | | 66.6 | |
| Labour hold | | Swing | | |

=== Central ===
Central 1989
| Party | Candidate | Votes | % | ±% |
|---|---|---|---|---|
| Labour | C. Champion | 643 | 42.3 | |
| SLD | Fred Hornblow* | 607 | 40.0 | |
| Conservative | M. Yates | 185 | 12.2 | |
| Plaid Cymru | M. Williams | 84 | 5.5 | |
| Majority | | | | |
| Turnout | | | 35.9 | |
| Labour gain from Liberal Democrats | | Swing | | |

=== Cornerswell ===
Cornerswell 1989
| Party | Candidate | Votes | % | ±% |
|---|---|---|---|---|
| Labour | E. Tincknell* | 1,437 | 45.4 | |
| Conservative | J. Flanigan | 1,394 | 44.1 | |
| SLD | R. Morris | 226 | 7.1 | |
| Plaid Cymru | G. Ap Sion | 107 | 3.4 | |
| Majority | | | | |
| Turnout | | | 53.4 | |
| Labour hold | | Swing | | |

=== Court ===
Court 1989
| Party | Candidate | Votes | % | ±% |
|---|---|---|---|---|
| Labour | S. Parsons | 1,966 | 71.2 | |
| Conservative | A. Price | 505 | 18.3 | |
| Green | K. Simpson | 119 | 4.3 | |
| SLD | S. O'Brien | 86 | 3.1 | |
| SDP | D. Williams | 85 | 3.1 | |
| Majority | | | | |
| Turnout | | | 71.6 | |
| Labour hold | | Swing | | |

=== Cowbridge ===
Cowbridge 1989
| Party | Candidate | Votes | % | ±% |
|---|---|---|---|---|
| Conservative | R. Thomas* | 2,458 | 55.9 | |
| Labour | J. Jones | 1,610 | 36.6 | |
| SLD | J. Sully | 328 | 7.5 | |
| Majority | | | | |
| Turnout | | | 75.9 | |
| Conservative hold | | Swing | | |

=== Cyncoed Village ===
Cyncoed Village 1989
| Party | Candidate | Votes | % | ±% |
|---|---|---|---|---|
| SLD | R. Holman | 1,224 | 46.6 | |
| Conservative | L.M. Harris | 1,131 | 43.0 | |
| Labour | A. Cox | 172 | 6.5 | |
| SDP | D. Thomas | 102 | 3.9 | |
| Majority | | | | |
| Turnout | | | 61.0 | |
| SLD hold | | Swing | | |

=== Cyntwell ===
Cyntwell 1989
| Party | Candidate | Votes | % | ±% |
|---|---|---|---|---|
| Labour | B. Phillips* | 947 | 64.5 | |
| SLD | P. Gemson | 404 | 27.5 | |
| Conservative | A. Renwick | 117 | 8.0 | |
| Majority | | | | |
| Turnout | | | 39.9 | |
| Labour hold | | Swing | | |

=== Deri ===
Deri 1989
| Party | Candidate | Votes | % | ±% |
|---|---|---|---|---|
| Conservative | M. Davies* | 1,182 | 54.7 | |
| Labour | S. Williams | 534 | 24.7 | |
| Green | G. Jones | 225 | 10.4 | |
| SLD | G. Hallett | 219 | 10.1 | |
| Majority | | | | |
| Turnout | | | 47.5 | |
| Conservative hold | | Swing | | |

=== Dinas Powys North ===
Dinas Powys North 1989
| Party | Candidate | Votes | % | ±% |
|---|---|---|---|---|
| Plaid Cymru | Chris Franks* | 1,599 | 45.0 | |
| Conservative | B. McParlin | 1,089 | 30.6 | |
| Labour | J. Imperato | 603 | 17.0 | |
| SLD | M. Taylor | 150 | 4.2 | |
| SDP | F. Eason | 116 | 3.3 | |
| Majority | | | | |
| Turnout | | | 70.2 | |
| Plaid Cymru hold | | Swing | | |

=== Dinas Powys South ===
Dinas Powys South 1989
| Party | Candidate | Votes | % | ±% |
|---|---|---|---|---|
| Conservative | A. Hill* | 1,625 | 43.2 | |
| Labour | R. Cox | 1,034 | 27.5 | |
| Plaid Cymru | E. Roberts | 744 | 19.8 | |
| SDP | M. James | 208 | 5.5 | |
| SLD | H. James | 149 | 4.0 | |
| Majority | | | | |
| Turnout | | | 66.7 | |
| Conservative hold | | Swing | | |

=== Dyfan ===
Dyfan 1989
| Party | Candidate | Votes | % | ±% |
|---|---|---|---|---|
| Labour | C. Watkins* | 1,511 | 53.5 | |
| Conservative | J. Coombs | 1,006 | 44.0 | |
| SLD | C. Jones | 309 | 10.9 | |
| Majority | | | | |
| Turnout | | | 69.5 | |
| Labour hold | | Swing | | |

=== Eglwys Wen ===
Eglwys Wen 1989
| Party | Candidate | Votes | % | ±% |
|---|---|---|---|---|
| Labour | A. Fennessy | 1,372 | 44.0 | |
| Conservative | L. Quinn* | 1,218 | 39.1 | |
| Green | M. Cottam | 219 | 7.0 | |
| SLD | A. Leavers | 158 | 5.1 | |
| Plaid Cymru | Alan Jobbins | 150 | 4.8 | |
| Majority | | | | |
| Turnout | | | 52.2 | |
| Labour gain from Conservative | | Swing | | |

=== Fairwater ===
Fairwater 1989
| Party | Candidate | Votes | % | ±% |
|---|---|---|---|---|
| Labour | P. Jarvis | 1,271 | 55.4 | |
| Conservative | D. Norman | 554 | 24.1 | |
| SDP | R. Drake | 411 | 17.9 | |
| SLD | A. Wigley | 59 | 2.6 | |
| Majority | | | | |
| Turnout | | | 43.1 | |
| Labour hold | | Swing | | |

=== Gabalfa ===
Gabalfa 1989
| Party | Candidate | Votes | % | ±% |
|---|---|---|---|---|
| Labour | D. Campbell* | 1,339 | 65.7 | |
| Conservative | G. Porter | 421 | 20.7 | |
| Green | N. Thorne | 147 | 7.2 | |
| SLD | Cathy Pearcy | 130 | 6.4 | |
| Majority | | | | |
| Turnout | | | 44.2 | |
| Labour hold | | Swing | | |

=== Gibbonsdown ===
Gibbonsdown 1989
| Party | Candidate | Votes | % | ±% |
|---|---|---|---|---|
| Labour | B. Murray* | 2,006 | 73.1 | |
| Conservative | S. Bravery | 522 | 19.0 | |
| SLD | J. Potter | 114 | 4.2 | |
| Plaid Cymru | S. Biddiscombe | 102 | 3.7 | |
| Majority | | | | |
| Turnout | | | 70.5 | |
| Labour hold | | Swing | | |

=== Glan Ely ===
Glan Ely 1989
| Party | Candidate | Votes | % | ±% |
|---|---|---|---|---|
| Labour | Robert Morgan* | 1,508 | 82.5 | |
| Conservative | J. Bushrod | 214 | 11.7 | |
| SLD | H. Gemson | 106 | 5.8 | |
| Majority | | | | |
| Turnout | | | 32.8 | |
| Labour hold | | Swing | | |

=== Heath Park ===
Heath Park 1989
| Party | Candidate | Votes | % | ±% |
|---|---|---|---|---|
| Conservative | Tony John | 1,178 | 55.6 | |
| Labour | P. Hampleton | 643 | 30.3 | |
| SLD | W. Monkley | 298 | 14.1 | |
| Majority | | | | |
| Turnout | | | 39.6 | |
| Conservative hold | | Swing | | |

=== Highmead ===
Highmead 1989
| Party | Candidate | Votes | % | ±% |
|---|---|---|---|---|
| Labour | H. Gough* | 1,479 | 77.9 | |
| Conservative | D. Neale | 313 | 16.5 | |
| SLD | M. Rawnsley | 107 | 5.6 | |
| Majority | | | | |
| Turnout | | | 35.8 | |
| Labour hold | | Swing | | |

=== Illtyd ===
Illtyd 1989
| Party | Candidate | Votes | % | ±% |
|---|---|---|---|---|
| Labour | Matthew Griffiths | 1,825 | 47.0 | |
| Conservative | E. Williams* | 1,689 | 41.8 | |
| SLD | K. Wade | 196 | 4.9 | |
| Plaid Cymru | S. Baker | 165 | 4.1 | |
| SDP | R. Lewis | 162 | 4.0 | |
| Majority | | | | |
| Turnout | | | 70.4 | |
| Labour gain from Conservative | | Swing | | |

=== Lakeside ===
Lakeside 1989
| Party | Candidate | Votes | % | ±% |
|---|---|---|---|---|
| SLD | W. Congreve | 949 | 37.7 | |
| Conservative | J. Dickson | 905 | 35.9 | |
| SDP | Anthony Jeremy* | 459 | 18.2 | |
| Labour | D. Bevan | 206 | 8.2 | |
| Majority | | | | |
| Turnout | | | 54.9 | |
| SLD gain from SDP | | Swing | | |

=== Landsdowne ===
Landsdowne 1989
| Party | Candidate | Votes | % | ±% |
|---|---|---|---|---|
| Labour | Cherry Short | 1,623 | 66.2 | |
| Conservative | J. Courtis | 633 | 25.8 | |
| SLD | P. Crees | 197 | 8.0 | |
| Majority | | | | |
| Turnout | | | 41.6 | |
| Labour hold | | Swing | | |

=== Lisvane with St Mellons ===
Lisvane with St Mellons 1989
| Party | Candidate | Votes | % | ±% |
|---|---|---|---|---|
| Conservative | H. Campbell | 1,256 | 77.6 | |
| Labour | M. Harries | 288 | 17.8 | |
| SLD | V. Pearcey | 75 | 4.6 | |
| Majority | | | | |
| Turnout | | | 34.6 | |
| Conservative hold | | Swing | | |

=== Llandaff ===
Llandaff 1989
| Party | Candidate | Votes | % | ±% |
|---|---|---|---|---|
| Conservative | Julius Hermer* | 1,458 | 48.7 | |
| Labour | R. Watson | 775 | 25.6 | |
| SDP | D. Marshall | 368 | 12.1 | |
| SLD | W. Slack | 254 | 8.4 | |
| Plaid Cymru | S. Morgan | 175 | 5.8 | |
| Majority | | | | |
| Turnout | | | 45.2 | |
| Conservative hold | | Swing | | |

=== Llandaff North ===
Llandaff North 1989
| Party | Candidate | Votes | % | ±% |
|---|---|---|---|---|
| Labour | A. Hearne* | 1,883 | 71.4 | |
| Conservative | D. Harris | 581 | 22.0 | |
| SLD | C. Pearcey | 175 | 6.6 | |
| Majority | | | | |
| Turnout | | | 42.8 | |
| Labour hold | | Swing | | |

=== Llanedeyrn ===
Llanedeyrn 1989
| Party | Candidate | Votes | % | ±% |
|---|---|---|---|---|
| SDP | Vita Jones* | 1,191 | 48.1 | |
| Labour | R. Longsworth | 870 | 35.1 | |
| Conservative | W. Pursey | 257 | 10.4 | |
| SLD | C. Ribton | 100 | 4.0 | |
| Plaid Cymru | A. Morgan | 60 | 2.4 | |
| Majority | | | | |
| Turnout | | | 37.0 | |
| SDP hold | | Swing | | |

=== Llanrumney North ===
Llanrumney North 1989
| Party | Candidate | Votes | % | ±% |
|---|---|---|---|---|
| Labour | B. Lawes | 1,413 | 83.8 | |
| Conservative | R. Robinson | 273 | 16.2 | |
| Majority | | | | |
| Turnout | | | 36.1 | |
| Labour hold | | Swing | | |

=== Llanrumney South ===
Llanrumney South 1989
| Party | Candidate | Votes | % | ±% |
|---|---|---|---|---|
| Labour | D. Francis* | 1,336 | 74.5 | |
| Conservative | M. Evans | 457 | 25.5 | |
| Majority | | | | |
| Turnout | | | 36.1 | |
| Labour hold | | Swing | | |

=== Mackintosh ===
Mackintosh 1989
| Party | Candidate | Votes | % | ±% |
|---|---|---|---|---|
| Labour | Julie Morgan* | 1,427 | 60.1 | |
| Conservative | R. Attwell | 396 | 16.7 | |
| SLD | E. Atwell | 364 | 15.5 | |
| Green | C. Von-Ruhland | 126 | 5.3 | |
| Plaid Cymru | A. Fearon | 63 | 2.7 | |
| Majority | | | | |
| Turnout | | | 44.4 | |
| Labour hold | | Swing | | |

=== Maindy ===
Maindy 1989
| Party | Candidate | Votes | % | ±% |
|---|---|---|---|---|
| SLD | J. Toye | 1,148 | 45.6 | |
| Labour | Reginald Surridge | 1,083 | 43.1 | |
| Conservative | N. Hutton | 284 | 11.3 | |
| Majority | | | | |
| Turnout | | | 45.6 | |
| Alliance hold | | Swing | | |

=== North Whitchurch with Tongwynlais ===
North Whitchurch with Tongwynlais 1989
| Party | Candidate | Votes | % | ±% |
|---|---|---|---|---|
| Labour | W. Salmon | 1,579 | 53.4 | |
| Conservative | R. Evans* | 1,147 | 43.1 | |
| SLD | H. Howell | 231 | 7.8 | |
| Majority | | | | |
| Turnout | | | 52.2 | |
| Labour gain from Conservative | | Swing | | |

=== Pantllacca ===
Pantllacca 1989
| Party | Candidate | Votes | % | ±% |
|---|---|---|---|---|
| SLD | K. Holman | 687 | 38.8 | |
| Labour | R. Austin | 606 | 34.3 | |
| Conservative | E. Bainbridge | 318 | 18.0 | |
| SDP | D. Steele | 107 | 6.0 | |
| Green | G. John | 51 | 2.9 | |
| Majority | | | | |
| Turnout | | | 34.8 | |
| Liberal Democrats hold | | Swing | | |

=== Pantmawr ===
Pantmawr 1989
| Party | Candidate | Votes | % | ±% |
|---|---|---|---|---|
| Conservative | Gareth Neale* | 1,298 | 55.2 | |
| Labour | L. Jenkins | 607 | 25.8 | |
| SLD | J. Brent | 446 | 19.0 | |
| Majority | | | | |
| Turnout | | | 46.0 | |
| Conservative hold | | Swing | | |

=== Park ===
Park 1989
| Party | Candidate | Votes | % | ±% |
|---|---|---|---|---|
| Labour | Sue Lent | 1,067 | 44.5 | |
| SLD | P.K. Verma | 584 | 24.3 | |
| Conservative | S. Evans | 515 | 21.5 | |
| Green | P. Ward | 233 | 9.7 | |
| Majority | | | | |
| Turnout | | | 35.2 | |
| Labour hold | | Swing | | |

=== Pentre Bane ===
Pentre Bane 1989
| Party | Candidate | Votes | % | ±% |
|---|---|---|---|---|
| Labour | Caerwyn Roderick* | 1,381 | 70.5 | |
| Conservative | C. Ward | 290 | 14.8 | |
| SDP | D. Griffin | 232 | 11.8 | |
| SLD | I. Isaacs | 55 | 2.8 | |
| Majority | | | | |
| Turnout | | | 38.8 | |
| Labour hold | | Swing | | |

=== Penylan ===
Penylan 1989
| Party | Candidate | Votes | % | ±% |
|---|---|---|---|---|
| Conservative | G. Hughes | 1,088 | 53.0 | |
| Labour | R. Rees | 481 | 23.4 | |
| SLD | D. Rees | 348 | 17.0 | |
| SDP | S. Jeremy | 136 | 6.6 | |
| Majority | | | | |
| Turnout | | | 43.2 | |
| Conservative hold | | Swing | | |

=== Plymouth ===
Plymouth 1989
| Party | Candidate | Votes | % | ±% |
|---|---|---|---|---|
| Conservative | D. Turner | 1,181 | 55.6 | |
| Labour | L. Smith | 545 | 25.6 | |
| SLD | R. Francis | 400 | 18.8 | |
| Majority | | | | |
| Turnout | | | 49.2 | |
| Conservative hold | | Swing | | |

=== Pontcanna ===
Pontcanna 1989
| Party | Candidate | Votes | % | ±% |
|---|---|---|---|---|
| Labour | Mark Drakeford* | 1,390 | 61.7 | |
| Conservative | J. Hallinan | 563 | 25.0 | |
| Plaid Cymru | N. Hodges | 219 | 9.7 | |
| SLD | D. Mytton | 82 | 3,6 | |
| Majority | | | | |
| Turnout | | | 46.5 | |
| Labour hold | | Swing | | |

=== Radyr with St Fagans ===
Radyr with St Fagans 1989
| Party | Candidate | Votes | % | ±% |
|---|---|---|---|---|
| SDP | Marian Drake* | 994 | 45.7 | |
| Conservative | D. Philpott | 792 | 36.4 | |
| Labour | M. Smith | 349 | 16.1 | |
| SLD | Roger Burley | 39 | 1.8 | |
| Majority | | | | |
| Turnout | | | 55.4 | |
| SDP hold | | Swing | | |

=== Rhoose with Llancarfan ===
Rhoose with Llancarfan 1989
| Party | Candidate | Votes | % | ±% |
|---|---|---|---|---|
| Conservative | H. James* | 1,715 | 60.6 | |
| Labour | N. Chapman | 828 | 29.3 | |
| SLD | C. Arnot | 287 | 10.1 | |
| Majority | | | | |
| Turnout | | | 72.0 | |
| Conservative hold | | Swing | | |

=== Riverside South ===
Riverside South 1989
| Party | Candidate | Votes | % | ±% |
|---|---|---|---|---|
| Labour | Jane Hutt* | 1,354 | 79.0 | |
| Conservative | P. Young | 250 | 14.6 | |
| Plaid Cymru | C. Ap Henri | 109 | 6.4 | |
| Majority | | | | |
| Turnout | | | 40.2 | |
| Labour hold | | Swing | | |

=== Rumney ===
Rumney 1989
| Party | Candidate | Votes | % | ±% |
|---|---|---|---|---|
| Labour | M. Payne | 1,729 | 58.1 | |
| Conservative | J. Joslyn | 1,248 | 41.9 | |
| Majority | | | | |
| Turnout | | | 43.9 | |
| Labour hold | | Swing | | |

=== Saltmead ===
Saltmead 1989
| Party | Candidate | Votes | % | ±% |
|---|---|---|---|---|
| Labour | D. Richards* | 1,548 | 73.0 | |
| Conservative | W. Selwood | 573 | 27.0 | |
| Majority | | | | |
| Turnout | | | 44.4 | |
| Labour hold | | Swing | | |

=== Splott ===
Splott 1989
| Party | Candidate | Votes | % | ±% |
|---|---|---|---|---|
| Labour | Jack Brooks* | 1,588 | 74.0 | |
| Conservative | J. Kingston | 366 | 17.1 | |
| SLD | S. Ahmed | 107 | 5.0 | |
| Plaid Cymru | Barbara Anglezarke | 85 | 4.0 | |
| Majority | | | 56.9 | |
| Turnout | | | 44.0 | |
| Labour hold | | Swing | | |

=== St Athan with Boverton ===
St Athan with Boverton 1989
| Party | Candidate | Votes | % | ±% |
|---|---|---|---|---|
| Labour | B. Doughty | 1,253 | 47.0 | |
| Conservative | J. George* | 1,116 | 41.9 | |
| SDP | K. Owen | 144 | 5.4 | |
| Plaid Cymru | S. Stephens | 97 | 3.6 | |
| SLD | D. Poor | 54 | 2.0 | |
| Majority | | | | |
| Turnout | | | 54.5 | |
| Labour gain from Conservative | | Swing | | |

=== St Augustines ===
St Augustines 1989
| Party | Candidate | Votes | % | ±% |
|---|---|---|---|---|
| Labour | P. Gray* | 919 | 43.4 | |
| Conservative | P. Blyth | 620 | 29.3 | |
| SLD | J. Sibert | 465 | 21.9 | |
| Plaid Cymru | M. Harries | 115 | 5.4 | |
| Majority | | | | |
| Turnout | | | 47.2 | |
| Labour hold | | Swing | | |

=== Stanwell ===
Stanwell 1989
| Party | Candidate | Votes | % | ±% |
|---|---|---|---|---|
| Labour | I. Dewar* | 1,047 | 59.2 | |
| Conservative | R. Williams | 576 | 32.6 | |
| SLD | L. Beard | 78 | 4.4 | |
| Plaid Cymru | A. Packar | 68 | 3.8 | |
| Majority | | | | |
| Turnout | | | 58.2 | |
| Labour hold | | Swing | | |

=== The Marl ===
The Marl 1989
| Party | Candidate | Votes | % | ±% |
|---|---|---|---|---|
| Labour | Peter Perkins* | 941 | 48.9 | |
| Conservative | J. Summerhayes | 475 | 24.9 | |
| Independent | A. Baber | 457 | 23.7 | |
| SLD | A. Ali | 52 | 2.7 | |
| Majority | | | | |
| Turnout | | | 46.5 | |
| Labour hold | | Swing | | |

=== Thornhill ===
The seat had been won by an Alliance (SDP) candidate in 1985 but was gained by Labour at a subsequent by-election.

Thornhill 1989
| Party | Candidate | Votes | % | ±% |
|---|---|---|---|---|
| Labour | Nicholas Butler* | 1,637 | 37.6 | |
| Conservative | H. Philpott | 1,161 | 31.7 | |
| SLD | V. Hallet | 699 | 19.1 | |
| SDP | E. Heaven | 160 | 4.4 | |
| Majority | | | | |
| Turnout | | | 55.2 | |
| Labour hold | | Swing | | |

=== Ton-yr-Ywen ===
Ton-yr-Ywen 1989
| Party | Candidate | Votes | % | ±% |
|---|---|---|---|---|
| Conservative | B. Rees* | 929 | 48.1 | |
| Labour | L. Poole | 529 | 27.4 | |
| Green | M. Evans | 244 | 12.6 | |
| SLD | K. Bowden | 230 | 11.9 | |
| Majority | | | | |
| Turnout | | | 45.2 | |
| Conservative hold | | Swing | | |

=== Trelai ===
Trelai 1989
| Party | Candidate | Votes | % | ±% |
|---|---|---|---|---|
| SLD | Jacqui Gasson | 937 | 47.3 | |
| Labour | Harry Ernest | 899 | 45.4 | |
| Conservative | E. Gillard | 85 | 4.3 | |
| Green | J. Edwards | 47 | 2.4 | |
| SDP | A. Evans | 11 | 0.6 | |
| Majority | | | | |
| Turnout | | | 50.1 | |
| Liberal Democrats gain from Labour | | Swing | | |

=== Tremorfa ===
Tremorfa 1989
| Party | Candidate | Votes | % | ±% |
|---|---|---|---|---|
| Labour | Gordon Houlston* | 1,236 | 83.6 | |
| Conservative | A. Fox | 182 | 12.3 | |
| SLD | A. Taylor | 60 | 4.1 | |
| Majority | | | | |
| Turnout | | | 50.7 | |
| Labour hold | | Swing | | |

=== Trowbridge ===
Trowbridge 1989
| Party | Candidate | Votes | % | ±% |
|---|---|---|---|---|
| Labour | W. Bowen* | 2,108 | 79.1 | |
| Conservative | A. Hollands | 558 | 20.9 | |
| Majority | | | | |
| Turnout | | | 35.8 | |
| Labour hold | | Swing | | |

=== Ty Glas ===
Ty Glas 1989
| Party | Candidate | Votes | % | ±% |
|---|---|---|---|---|
| Labour | Christopher Bettinson | 971 | 45.0 | |
| Conservative | Greville Tatham* | 926 | 42.9 | |
| SLD | J. Bennet | 262 | 12.1 | |
| Majority | | | | |
| Turnout | | | 57.4 | |
| Labour gain from Conservative | | Swing | | |

=== Vale of Glamorgan North East ===
Vale of Glamorgan North East 1989
| Party | Candidate | Votes | % | ±% |
|---|---|---|---|---|
| Conservative | M. Prior | 1,639 | 59.6 | |
| Labour | S. Gough | 543 | 19.8 | |
| SLD | K. Matthews | 423 | 15.4 | |
| SDP | D. Britton | 143 | 5.2 | |
| Majority | | | | |
| Turnout | | | 73.3 | |
| Conservative hold | | Swing | | |

=== Vale of Glamorgan South West ===
Vale of Glamorgan South West 1989
| Party | Candidate | Votes | % | ±% |
|---|---|---|---|---|
| Labour | L. Hughes* | 2,295 | 69.4 | |
| Conservative | S. Hignall | 690 | 20.9 | |
| Green | S. Middleditch | 264 | 8.0 | |
| SDP | E. Owen | 32 | 1.0 | |
| SLD | Peter Sain Ley Berry | 28 | 0.8 | |
| Majority | | | | |
| Turnout | | | 70.8 | |
| Labour hold | | Swing | | |

=== Waterloo ===
Waterloo 1989
| Party | Candidate | Votes | % | ±% |
|---|---|---|---|---|
| SLD | L. Kelloway* | 1,123 | 48.7 | |
| Conservative | T. Croft | 655 | 28.4 | |
| Labour | P. Mitchell | 500 | 21.7 | |
| SDP | E. Morgan | 27 | 1.2 | |
| Majority | | | | |
| Turnout | | | 51.2 | |
| Liberal Democrats hold | | Swing | | |

KEY

* existing councillor, for the same ward

== By-elections between 1989 and 1993 ==
Two by-elections were held on 2 May 1991, the same day as elections to Cardiff City Council. Both were defended by the Liberal Democrats with one of the seats being narrowly lost to Labour.

=== Cyncoed Village ===
Cyncoed Village by-election, 2 May 1991
| Party | Candidate | Votes | % | ±% |
|---|---|---|---|---|
| Liberal Democrats | J. Holliday | 1,444 | | |
| Conservative | C. Millard | 1,116 | | |
| Labour | M. Harries | 169 | | |
| Majority | | | | |
| Turnout | | | | |
| Liberal Democrats hold | | Swing | | |

=== Pantllacca ===
Pantllacca by-election, 2 May 1991
| Party | Candidate | Votes | % | ±% |
|---|---|---|---|---|
| Labour | Graham Hinchey | 788 | | |
| Liberal Democrats | V. Lane | 768 | | |
| Conservative | D. Conquer | 400 | | |
| Majority | | | | |
| Turnout | | | | |
| Labour gain from Liberal Democrats | | Swing | | |
