= Hertfordshire County Council elections =

Local government elections in Hertfordshire, England

Hertfordshire County Council in England is elected every four years. Since the last boundary changes took effect in 2017 there have been 78 electoral divisions electing one councillor each.

== Elections ==
Summary of the council composition, click on the year for full details of each election.

Year	Conservative	Labour	Liberal Democrats (Note: Includes totals for the predecessors of the Liberal Democrats, the Liberal Party and SDP (both of which participated in the Alliance).)	Reform	Green	Independents & Others	Council control after election
Local government reorganisation; council established (72 seats)
1973	35	33	3	–	–	1	No overall control
1977	65	6	0	–	0	1	Conservative
New division boundaries; increased seats from 72 to 77
1981	43	29	4	–	0	1	Conservative
1985	36	27	14	–	0	0	No overall control
1989	45	27	5	–	0	0	Conservative
1993	27	30	19	–	0	1	No overall control
1997	38	30	9	–	0	0	No overall control
New division boundaries
2001	40	27	10	–	0	0	Conservative
2005	46	16	14	–	1	0	Conservative
2009	55	3	17	–	1	1 (Note: 1 British National Party)	Conservative
2013	46	15	16	–	0	0	Conservative
New division boundaries
2017	51	9	18	–	0	0	Conservative
2021	46	7	23	0	1	1	Conservative
2025	22	5	31	14	5	1	No overall control

=== Result maps ===
2001 results map

2005 results map

2009 results map

2013 results map

2017 results map

2021 results map

2025 results map

== By-election results ==
By-elections are held for any vacancies that arise between elections.

=== 1993–1997 ===
Cheshunt West By-Election 18 July 1996
Party	Candidate	Votes	%	±%
Conservative	Gerald Game	1,067	62.0	
Labour	Sylvia Courtnage	424	24.6	
Liberal Democrats	Henry Appiah	231	13.4	
Majority		643	37.4	
Turnout		1,722	14.83	
Conservative hold		Swing		

Kings Langley By-Election 26 September 1996
Party	Candidate	Votes	%	±%
Conservative		1,406	50.9	
Labour		1,083	39.2	
Liberal Democrats		273	9.9	
Majority		323		
Turnout		2,762		
Conservative hold		Swing		

=== 1997–2001 ===
South East Hemel Hempstead By-Election 10 June 1999
Party	Candidate	Votes	%	±%
Conservative		1,842	47.8	+12.6
Labour		1,642	42.1	−6.0
Liberal Democrats		388	10.1	−6.6
Majority		218	5.7	
Turnout		3,854	34.0	
Conservative gain from Labour		Swing		

Hitchin North East By-Election 17 February 2000
Party	Candidate	Votes	%	±%
Labour		1,399	50.6	−4.8
Conservative		1,106	40.1	+12.4
Liberal Democrats		166	6.0	−11.0
Natural Law		95	3.4	+3.4
Majority		293	10.5	
Turnout		2,766	24.9	
Labour hold		Swing		

Offa By-Election 13 April 2000
Party	Candidate	Votes	%	±%
Conservative		1,293	51.7	+11.3
Labour		941	37.6	−5.5
Liberal Democrats		240	9.6	−6.9
Natural Law		27	1.1	+1.1
Majority		352	14.1	
Turnout		2,501	27.9	
Conservative gain from Labour		Swing		

Bushey Heath By-Election 4 May 2000
Party	Candidate	Votes	%	±%
Conservative		1,590	60.3	+5.1
Liberal Democrats		808	30.7	+3.6
Labour		237	9.0	−8.7
Majority		782	29.6	
Turnout		2,635	32.7	
Conservative hold		Swing		

Shephall By-Election 4 May 2000
Party	Candidate	Votes	%	±%
Labour		1,434	65.6	+5.1
Conservative		482	22.0	−1.6
Liberal Democrats		270	12.4	+0.3
Majority		952	43.6	
Turnout		2,186	23.5	
Labour hold		Swing		

=== 2001–2005 ===
St. Albans North By-Election 12 July 2001
Party	Candidate	Votes	%	±%
Labour		1,445	41.3	+3.9
Liberal Democrats		1,113	31.8	−0.2
Conservative		912	26.1	−4.5
Independent		25	0.7	+0.7
Majority		332	9.5	
Turnout		3,495	34.7	
Labour hold		Swing		

Meriden Tudor By-Election 28 November 2002
Party	Candidate	Votes	%	±%
Liberal Democrats	Audrey Oaten	1,413	51.0	+35.1
Labour	Geoffrey O'Connell	817	29.5	−14.6
Conservative	Richard Southern	472	17.0	−15.8
Green	Ian West	70	2.5	−0.7
Majority		596	21.5	
Turnout		2,772	27.7	
Liberal Democrats gain from Labour		Swing		

Hatfield South By-Election 19 June 2003
Party	Candidate	Votes	%	±%
Conservative		1,246	48.8	+11.5
Labour		933	36.6	−8.5
Liberal Democrats		372	14.6	−3.0
Majority		313	12.2	
Turnout		2,551	26.8	
Conservative gain from Labour		Swing		

Kings Langley By-Election 18 September 2003
Party	Candidate	Votes	%	±%
Conservative		1,851	59.9	+8.8
Liberal Democrats		625	20.2	+2.3
Labour		614	19.9	−5.6
Majority		1,226	39.7	
Turnout		3,090	30.2	
Conservative hold		Swing		

Hertford All Saints By-Election 5 February 2004
Party	Candidate	Votes	%	±%
Conservative		1,064	52.5	+11.4
Labour		559	27.6	−5.6
Liberal Democrats		403	19.9	−5.8
Majority		505	24.9	
Turnout		2,026	21.8	
Conservative hold		Swing		

=== 2005–2009 ===
Shephall By-Election 15 September 2005
Party	Candidate	Votes	%	±%
Labour	John Lloyd	1,144	45.5	−5.5
Liberal Democrats	Elisabeth Knight	994	39.6	+18.8
Conservative	Ralph Dimelow	374	14.9	−13.3
Majority		150	5.9	
Turnout		2,512	28.1	
Labour hold		Swing		

Knebworth and Codicote By-Election 22 June 2006
Party	Candidate	Votes	%	±%
Conservative	Richard Thake	1,759	69.7	+14.4
Labour	Joseph McWalter	322	12.7	−5.6
Liberal Democrats	Debra Wilkins	310	12.3	−7.0
Green	Stuart Madgin	133	5.2	−1.8
Majority		1,437	57.0	
Turnout		2,524	23.0	
Conservative hold		Swing		

Harpenden South West By-Election 7 February 2008
Party	Candidate	Votes	%	±%
Conservative	Teresa Heritage	2,161	66.6	+10.4
Liberal Democrats	Alison Steer	819	25.3	−0.4
Labour	Linda Spiri	153	4.7	−7.2
Green	Annette Tate	110	3.4	−2.8
Majority		1,342	41.3	
Turnout		3,243	30.2	
Conservative hold		Swing		

Bedwell By-Election 27 March 2008
Party	Candidate	Votes	%	±%
Labour	Sharon Taylor	1,452	56.5	+1.0
Conservative	Leslie Clark	625	24.3	−0.6
Liberal Democrats	Len Lambert	329	12.8	−6.8
UKIP	Rick Seddon	165	6.4	+6.4
Majority		827	32.2	
Turnout		2,571	29.0	
Labour hold		Swing		

=== 2009–2013 ===
Borehamwood North By-Election 22 October 2009
Party	Candidate	Votes	%	±%
Conservative	Alan Plancey	982	44.5	+5.5
Labour	Leon Reefe	928	42.1	+13.2
Liberal Democrats	Robert Gamble	170	7.7	−4.6
Independent	Frank Ward	125	5.7	−0.1
Majority		54	2.4	
Turnout		2,205	18.5	
Conservative hold		Swing		

St Albans South By-Election 3 June 2010
Party	Candidate	Votes	%	±%
Liberal Democrats	Martin Frearson	1,482	42.1	+2.6
Conservative	Salih Gaygusuz	1,250	35.5	+4.1
Labour	Iain Grant	540	15.3	−0.1
Green	Kate Metcalf	249	7.1	−6.7
Majority		232	6.6	
Turnout		3,521	33.1	
Liberal Democrats hold		Swing		

Bishops Stortford West By-Election 5 May 2011
Party	Candidate	Votes	%	±%
Conservative	Colin Bernard Woodward	2,483	52.7%	+7.6%
Liberal Democrats	Robert Ian Taylor	1,256	26.6%	+0.6%
Labour	Alexander Julian Young	977	20.7%	+10.5%
Majority		1,227		
Turnout		4,716		
Conservative hold		Swing		

At the preceding election there had also been candidates for the British National Party (307 votes, 8.0%) and for the Green Party (392 votes, 10.3%).

Waltham Cross By-Election 22 March 2012
Party	Candidate	Votes	%	±%
Conservative	Dee Hart	1,389	56.44	+14.54
Labour	Malcolm Aitken	837	34.01	+6.91
UKIP	Albert Nicholas	159	6.46	+6.46
Liberal Democrats	Peter Huse	76	3.09	−10.51
Majority		552	22.43	
Turnout		2,461	22.88	
Conservative hold		Swing		

Meriden Tudor By-Election 3 May 2012
Party	Candidate	Votes	%	±%
Liberal Democrats	Kareen Mary Hastrick	1231	40.2	−3.3%
Labour	Diana Mary Ivory	791	25.8	+13.1%
Conservative	Richard Lloyd Vaughan Southern	534	17.4	−10.2%
UKIP	Nicholas Richard Lincoln	351	11.5	n/a
Green	Paula Mary Evelyn Broadhurst	154	5.0	−2.5%
Majority		440	12.6%	
Turnout		3061	33.5	
Liberal Democrats hold		Swing		

Election caused by the resignation of previous incumbent.

Hemel Hempstead Town By-Election 21 June 2012
Party	Candidate	Votes	%	±%
Conservative	William Wyatt-Lowe	1413	47.8	−3.0
Labour	Mike Bromberg	693	23.5	+8.8
Liberal Democrats	Chris Angell	456	15.4	−5.8
Green	Paul Harris	180	6.1	−7.2
UKIP	Howard Koch	151	5.1	+5.1
Independent	Rodney Tucker	61	2.1	+2.1
Majority		720		
Turnout			23.8	
Conservative hold		Swing		

Election caused by the resignation of previous incumbent. Percentage change is since June 2009.

=== 2013–2017 ===
Hitchin North By-Election 12 September 2013
Party	Candidate	Votes	%	±%
Labour Co-op	Judi Candida BILLING	1250	47.8	+1.8
Conservative	Alan MILLARD	673	25.7	−7.0
Liberal Democrats	Lisa Victoria COURTS	246	9.4	+2.8
UKIP	John Finbarr BARRY	235	9.0	+9.0
Green	Gavin NICHOLSON	212	8.1	−6.6
Majority		577		
Turnout		2621	22.42	
Labour Co-op hold		Swing		

Caused by the death of the previous incumbent.

=== 2017–2021 ===
Council leader and Conservative councillor Robert Gordon CBE (Goffs Oak and Bury Green) died in October 2017. The seat was held for the Conservatives by Lesley Greensmith in the by-election on 22 February 2018.

Goffs Oak & Bury Green By Election 22 February 2018
Party	Candidate	Votes	%	±%
Conservative	Lesley Greensmyth	1,390	59.6	−5.3
Liberal Democrats	David Payne	482	20.7	+14.9
Labour	Selina Norgrove	393	16.8	−0.8
Green	Sally Kemp	69	3.0	N/A
Majority		1,536		
Turnout		2,334	19	−8
Conservative hold		Swing		

Liberal Democrat councillor Charlotte Hogg (St Albans North) resigned from the council in March 2018. A by-election was held on 3 May, where Roma Mills from the Labour Party captured the seat from the Liberal Democrats.

St Albans North By-Election 3 May 2018
Party	Candidate	Votes	%	±%
Labour	Roma Mills	1,779	36.6	+2.8
Liberal Democrats	Karen Young	1,460	30.1	−5.2
Conservative	Salih Gaygusuz	1,361	28.0	+1.9
Green	Simon Grover	258	5.3	+2.2
Majority		319	6.5	
Turnout		4,858	48	
Labour gain from Liberal Democrats		Swing		

Three Rivers Rural By-Election 25 October 2018
Party	Candidate	Votes	%	±%
Liberal Democrats	Phil Williams	1,846	53.4	+9.6
Conservative	Angela Killick	1,315	38.0	−9.0
Labour	Jenni Gillet	144	4.2	±0.0
UKIP	David Bennett	86	2.5	+0.6
Green	Roan Alder	68	2.0	−1.0
Majority				
Turnout		3,463	30	
Liberal Democrats gain from Conservative		Swing		

=== 2021–2025 ===
Hitchin South: 10 March 2022
Party	Candidate	Votes	%	±%
Liberal Democrats	Keith Hoskins	2,401	71.7	+34.0
Conservative	Claire Strong	690	20.6	−16.3
Green	Deolinda Eltringham	223	6.7	−2.2
CPA	Leigh Smith	35	1.0	±0.0
Majority		1,711	51.1	
Turnout		3,363	31.4	
Liberal Democrats hold		Swing	▲25.2	

The by-election was caused by the death of the incumbent Liberal Democrat, Paul Clark in December 2021. The Lib Dems won with an increased majority with Labour opting not to nominate a candidate.

Hitchin North: 9 February 2023
Party	Candidate	Votes	%	±%
Labour	Ian Clive Albert	1,992	65.8	+12.7
Conservative	Ralph Gerald Muncer	526	17.4	−9.5
Green	Deolinda Maria Eltringham	415	13.7	+3.3
CPA	Leigh Smith	93	3.1	+3.1
Majority		1466	48.4	
Turnout		3036	26.4	−17
Labour hold		Swing		

The by-election was caused by the death of the Labour incumbent, Judi Billing in November 2022. Labour won with an increased majority with the Lib Dems opting not to nominate a candidate.

Harpenden Rural: 7 December 2023
Party	Candidate	Votes	%	±%
Liberal Democrats	Allison Wren	1,474	58.2	+32.9
Conservative	Claudio Duran	766	30.3	−26.8
Labour	Symon Vegro	168	6.7	−4.0
Green	Mario May	119	4.8	−2.1
Majority		708	27.9	N/A
Turnout		2,538	22.6	−21.6
Liberal Democrats gain from Conservative		Swing	▲29.8	

This by-election was caused by the resignation of the incumbent Conservative, Annie Brewster.

Bedwell: 29 August 2024
Party	Candidate	Votes	%	±%
Labour	Ellie Plater	962	46.9	−0.6
Conservative	Harry Curtis	470	22.9	−11.7
Reform	Janet Bainbridge	352	17.2	+17.2
Liberal Democrats	Riad Mannan	134	6.5	−3.2
Green	Balgiisa Ahmed	133	6.5	+0.5
Majority		492	24.0	
Turnout		2,051		
Labour hold		Swing		

This by-election was caused by the resignation of the Labour incumbent, Baroness Taylor of Stevenage.

=== 2025–2029 ===
Flamstead End and Turnford: 7 May 2026
Party	Candidate	Votes	%	±%
Conservative	Lesley Greensmyth	1,729	39.9	+2.8
Reform	Christopher Bush	1,530	35.3	−2.7
Green	Owen Brett	493	11.4	+6.4
Labour	Madeline McFadden	438	10.1	−3.0
Liberal Democrats	David Payne	147	3.4	+0.0
Majority		199	4.6	
Turnout		4,337		
Conservative gain from Reform		Swing		

This by-election was caused by the resignation of the Reform incumbent, Tony Hill.

Letchworth North: 19 November 2026
Party	Candidate	Votes	%	±%
Labour	Laura Williams	1,186	36.7	+7.0
Conservative	Simon Bloxham	614	19.0	−3.3
Reform	Garry Warren	530	16.4	−9.3
Liberal Democrats	Claire Winchester	495	15.3	+3.4
Green	Brett Dietrich	257	8.0	−2.4
Restore	Neil Almond	149	4.6	+4.6
Majority		572	17.7	
Turnout		3,231		
Labour hold		Swing		

This by-election was caused by the resignation of the Labour incumbent, Tina Bhartwas.
