= 2009 Hertfordshire County Council election =

2009 UK local government election

← 2005	4 June 2009	2013 →

All 77 seats to Hertfordshire County Council 39 seats needed for a majority
	First party	Second party
Party	Conservative	Liberal Democrats
Seats before	46	14
Seats won	55	17
Seat change	▲9	▲3
Popular vote	147,776	87,042
Percentage	46.4%	27.3%
Swing	▲3.9%	▲1.0%
	Third party	Fourth party
Party	Labour	Green
Seats before	16	1
Seats won	3	1
Seat change	▼13	Steady
Popular vote	44,650	22,900
Percentage	14.0%	7.2%
Swing	▼12.1%	▲2.4%
- 2009 local election results in Hertfordshire

- Council composition after the election.
Council control before election
Conservative
Council control after election
Conservative

An election to Hertfordshire County Council took place on 4 June 2009 the date of the 2009 United Kingdom local elections. The whole elected council was up for election. The councillors were elected from the 77 wards, which return one each by first-past-the-post voting for a four-year term of office. The wards were identical to those used at the previous election in 2005.

All locally registered electors (British, Irish, Commonwealth and European Union citizens) who were aged 18 or over on Thursday 4 June 2009 were entitled to vote in the local elections. Those who were temporarily away from their ordinary address (for example, away working, on holiday, in student accommodation or in hospital) were also entitled to vote in the local elections, although those who had moved abroad and registered as overseas electors cannot vote in the local elections. It is possible to register to vote at more than one address (such as a university student who had a term-time address and lives at home during holidays) at the discretion of the local Electoral Register Office, but it remains an offence to vote more than once in the same local government election.

== Summary ==
The Conservative Party retained and reinforced its control of the council with a net gain of 9 seats, and maintained an electoral stranglehold on the east of the county winning all seats in Broxbourne District, East Herts District, Hertsmere District & North Herts District. The Conservative party made significant gains in Stevenage District (3 seats), Dacorum District (3 seats), Welwyn Hatfield District (2 seats), Hertsmere District (2 seats) and North Herts District (2 seats). The Labour Party lost 13 seats, notably 3 in Stevenage District. This result left them with only 3 seats at County Hall. The Liberal Democrats gained 3 seats overall with a particularly strong performance in St Albans District at the expense of the Conservatives. The British National Party gained a seat in South Oxhey at the expense of Labour. It is also notable that the BNP came 2nd in the popular vote in Broxbourne District. The Green Party retained the seat gained in 2005 at Callowland Leggatts.

== Election results ==
Hertfordshire County Council Election Results 2009
Party	Seats	Gains	Losses	Net gain/loss	Seats %	Votes %	Votes	+/−
Conservative	55	12	3	▲9	71.4	46.4	147,776	+3.9
Liberal Democrats	17	4	1	▲3	22.1	27.3	87,042	+1.0
Labour	3	0	13	▼13	3.9	14.0	44,650	-12.1
Green	1	0	0	Steady	1.3	7.2	22,900	+2.5
BNP	1	1	0	▲1	1.3	3.3	10,486	+3.1
UKIP	0	0	0	Steady	0.0	0.9	2,785	+0.9
Independent	0	0	0	Steady	0.0	0.7	2,132	+0.6
English Democrat	0	0	0	Steady	0.0	0.2	739	N/A

== Results Summary by District ==
Broxbourne District County Council Election Results 2009
Party	Seats	Gains	Losses	Net gain/loss	Seats %	Votes %	Votes	+/−
Conservative	6	0	0	0	100.0	53.8	12,531	-2.8%
BNP	0	0	0	0	0	17.1	3,986	+13.5%
Labour	0	0	0	0	0	14.8	3,454	-10.6%
Liberal Democrats	0	0	0	0	0	14.2	3,305	+1.3%

Dacorum District County Council Election Results 2009
Party	Seats	Gains	Losses	Net gain/loss	Seats %	Votes %	Votes	+/−
Conservative	8	3	0	+3	80.0	47.9	20,666	+6.2%
Liberal Democrats	2	1	0	+1	20.0	25.0	10,802	+1.5%
Labour	0	0	4	-4	0.0	12.3	5,322	-16.2%
Green	0	0	0	0	0.0	9.1	3,921	+3.6%
BNP	0	0	0	0	0.0	3.1	1,318	+3.1%
Independent	0	0	0	0	0.0	2.0	867	+2.0%

East Herts District County Council Election Results 2009
Party	Seats	Gains	Losses	Net gain/loss	Seats %	Votes %	Votes	+/−
Conservative	10	0	0	0	100.0	56.1	22,510	+5.1%
Liberal Democrats	0	0	0	0	0.0	28.0	11,242	+5.7%
Labour	0	0	0	0	0.0	9.9	3,991	-10.2%
Independent	0	0	0	0	0.0	2.1	831	+2.1%
BNP	0	0	0	0	0.0	1.8	711	+1.8%
Green	0	0	0	0	0.0	1.0	392	-5.2%

Hertsmere District County Council Election Results 2009
Party	Seats	Gains	Losses	Net gain/loss	Seats %	Votes %	Votes	+/−
Conservative	7	2	0	+2	100.0	58.1	15,595	+7.9%
Liberal Democrats	0	0	1	-1	0.0	19.9	5,351	-2.5%
Labour	0	0	1	-1	0.0	14.2	3,797	-11.0%
Green	0	0	0	0	0.0	3.9	1,042	+2.2%
BNP	0	0	0	0	0.0	2.0	536	+2.0%
Independent	0	0	0	0	0.0	0.8	219	+0.8%

North Herts District County Council Election Results 2009
Party	Seats	Gains	Losses	Net gain/loss	Seats %	Votes %	Votes	+/−
Conservative	9	2	0	+2	100.0	47.9	18,923	+5.2%
Liberal Democrats	0	0	0	0	0.0	22.4	8,858	-3.1%
Labour	0	0	2	-2	0.0	14.4	5,680	-11.5%
Green	0	0	0	0	0.0	12.8	5,053	+7.4%
BNP	0	0	0	0	0.0	1.0	388	+1.0%
English Democrat	0	0	0	0	0.0	0.7	293	+0.7%

St Albans District County Council Election Results 2009
Party	Seats	Gains	Losses	Net gain/loss	Seats %	Votes %	Votes	+/−
Conservative	3	0	2	-2	30.0	39.8	18,148	+1.9%
Liberal Democrats	7	2	0	+2	70.0	38.6	17,597	+3.9%
Green	0	0	0	0	0.0	11.1	5,074	+6.2%
Labour	0	0	0	0	0.0	9.3	4,236	-12.1%
BNP	0	0	0	0	0.0	0.6	251	+0.6%

Stevenage District County Council Election Results 2009
Party	Seats	Gains	Losses	Net gain/loss	Seats %	Votes %	Votes	+/−
Labour	2	0	3	-3	33.3	29.7	6,626	-14.4%
Conservative	3	3	0	+3	50.0	28.4	6,344	-0.7%
Liberal Democrats	1	0	0	0	16.7	15.7	3,513	-8.5%
UKIP	0	0	0	0	0.0	12.5	2,785	+12.5%
BNP	0	0	0	0	0.0	5.9	1,301	+5.9%
Green	0	0	0	0	0.0	5.4	1,205	+3.4%
English Democrat	0	0	0	0	0.0	2.0	446	+2.0%

Three Rivers District County Council Election Results 2009
Party	Seats	Gains	Losses	Net gain/loss	Seats %	Votes %	Votes	+/−
Conservative	3	0	0	0	50.0	43.7	11,663	+4.6%
Liberal Democrats	2	0	0	0	33.3	41.7	11,124	+2.5%
Labour	0	0	1	-1	0.0	8.3	2,224	-8.8%
BNP	1	1	0	+1	16.7	5.3	1,420	+5.3%

Watford District County Council Election Results 2009
Party	Seats	Gains	Losses	Net gain/loss	Seats %	Votes %	Votes	+/−
Liberal Democrats	4	1	0	+1	66.6	40.3	9,529	+2.2%
Conservative	0	0	1	-1	0.0	25.6	6,046	+0.6%
Labour	1	0	0	0	16.7	19.7	4,646	-7.5
Green	1	0	0	0	16.7	12.3	2,914	+3.6
BNP	0	0	0	0	0.0	1.2	292	+1.2

Welwyn Hatfield District County Council Election Results 2009
Party	Seats	Gains	Losses	Net gain/loss	Seats %	Votes %	Votes	+/−
Conservative	6	2	0	+2	85.7	51.6	15,350	+6.9%
Liberal Democrats	1	0	0	0	14.3	19.2	5,721	+1.0%
Labour	0	0	2	-2	0.0	15.7	4,674	-16.2%
Green	0	0	0	0	0.0	11.1	3,299	+6.5%
BNP	0	0	0	0	0.0	1.0	283	+1.0%
Independent	0	0	0	0	0.0	0.7	215	+0.7%

== Broxbourne (6 Seats) ==
Cheshunt Central 4 June 2009 Broxbourne District
Party	Candidate	Votes	%	±%
Conservative	Dave Hewitt	2,001	54.6	+1.2
BNP	Caroline Iles	717	19.5	+10.4
Labour	Ron McCole	497	13.5	−12.5
Liberal Democrats	David Parry	455	12.4	+0.8
Majority		1,284	35.0	
Turnout		3,670	33.5	
Conservative hold		Swing		

Flamstead End & Turnford 4 June 2009 Broxbourne District
Party	Candidate	Votes	%	±%
Conservative	Christine Mitchell	2,233	54.0	−5.6
BNP	Ian Seeby	886	21.4	+21.4
Liberal Democrats	Paul Salter	523	12.6	+1.1
Labour	Ian Hunter	496	12.0	−12.2
Majority		1,347	32.6	
Turnout		4,138	32.1	
Conservative hold		Swing		

Goffs Oak & Bury Green 4 June 2009 Broxbourne District
Party	Candidate	Votes	%	±%
Conservative	Robert Gordon	2,347	60.1	−1.8
BNP	Wendy Ward	619	15.8	+15.8
Liberal Democrats	Lloyd Harris	479	12.3	+0.8
Labour	Alec McInnes	462	11.8	−10.1
Majority		1,728	44.2	
Turnout		3,907	36.0	
Conservative hold		Swing		

Hoddesdon North 4 June 2009 Broxbourne District
Party	Candidate	Votes	%	±%
Conservative	Wilf Eynon	1,973	54.3	−0.6
Labour	Annette Marples	584	16.1	−11.2
BNP	William Dewick	565	15.6	+15.6
Liberal Democrats	Thomas Clay	509	14.0	+1.6
Majority		1,389	38.3	
Turnout		3,631	34.4	
Conservative hold		Swing		

Hoddesdon South 4 June 2009 Broxbourne District
Party	Candidate	Votes	%	±%
Conservative	Alan Searing	2,501	56.8	−7.0
Liberal Democrats	Kirstie Mounsteven De Rivaz	860	19.5	+1.8
BNP	Ramon Johns	584	13.3	+13.3
Labour	Neil Harvey	460	10.4	−8.1
Majority		1,641	37.3	
Turnout		4,405	35.4	
Conservative hold		Swing		

Waltham Cross 4 June 2009 Broxbourne District
Party	Candidate	Votes	%	±%
Conservative	Terry Price	1,476	41.9	−0.4
Labour	Malcolm Aitken	955	27.1	−9.8
BNP	Stephen McCole	615	17.4	+9.1
Liberal Democrats	Michael Green	479	13.6	+1.5
Majority		521	14.8	
Turnout		3,525	33.8	
Conservative hold		Swing		

== Dacorum (10 Seats) ==
Berkhamsted division
Party	Candidate	Votes	%	±%
Conservative	Ian Reay	2,590	43.4	+1.8
Liberal Democrats	Garrick Stevens	2,001	33.5	−3.8
Independent	Norman Cutting	600	10.1	+10.0
Green	Anne Duvall	491	8.2	+1.5
Labour	Ray Jones	288	4.8	−9.7
Majority		589		
Turnout		5,970	44.7	−25.4
Conservative hold		Swing		

Bridgewater division
Party	Candidate	Votes	%	±%
Conservative	David Lloyd	2,316	60.9	+4.7
Liberal Democrats	Robert Irving	570	15.0	−5.5
Labour	Julia Coleman	314	8.3	−9.3
Green	Alan Johnson	310	8.1	+2.6
BNP	Simon Deacon	283	7.4	+7.4
Majority		1,746	45.9	
Turnout		3,793	45.2	−26.1
Conservative hold		Swing		

Hemel Hempstead East division
Party	Candidate	Votes	%	±%
Conservative	Andrew Williams	2,129	56.8	+10.6
Liberal Democrats	Sheila Daly	630	16.8	+1.1
Labour	Bernard Gronert	575	15.4	−18.3
Green	Jeffrey Fanstone	367	9.8	+5.8
Majority		1,499	40.0	
Turnout		3,701	34.8	−26.4
Conservative hold		Swing		

Hemel Hempstead North East division
Party	Candidate	Votes	%	±%
Conservative	Colette Wyatt-Lowe	1,734	53.6	+14.1
Labour	Anne Fisher	589	18.2	−21.8
Liberal Democrats	Alan Waugh	382	11.8	−3.9
BNP	Mark Fuller	321	9.9	+9.9
Green	Paul Sanford	196	6.1	+1.4
Majority		1,145	35.4	
Turnout		3,222	33.6	−23.1%
Conservative gain from Labour		Swing		

Hemel Hempstead North West division
Party	Candidate	Votes	%	±%
Conservative	Terence Douris	1,843	42.8	+7.5
Labour	Ian Laidlaw-Dickson	938	21.8	−20.0
Liberal Democrats	Steve Wilson	642	14.9	+0.5
BNP	Tina Adams	435	10.1	+10.0
Green	Jane Cousins	428	9.9	+5.0
Majority		905	21.0	
Turnout		4,286	37.8	−28.8
Conservative gain from Labour		Swing		

Hemel Hempstead St Pauls division
Party	Candidate	Votes	%	±%
Liberal Democrats	Ron Tindall	1,134	34.8	+13.7
Conservative	Dan Wood	1,097	33.6	+3.8
Labour	Maureen Flint	563	17.3	−26.6
Independent	El Gomez	267	8.2	+8.2
Green	Elaine Edwards	183	5.6	+0.8
Majority		37	1.2	
Turnout		3,244	36.0	−23.5
Liberal Democrats gain from Labour		Swing		

Hemel Hempstead South East division
Party	Candidate	Votes	%	±%
Conservative	Jan Maddern	1,878	47.8	+12.3
Labour	Gary Cook	865	22.0	−20.2
Liberal Democrats	Lynda Roe	657	16.7	−0.4
Green	Paul Harris	503	12.8	+8.0
Majority		1,013		
Turnout			35.7	
Conservative gain from Labour		Swing		

Hemel Hempstead Town division
Party	Candidate	Votes	%	±%
Conservative	Stephen Holmes	2,264	50.5	+11.6
Liberal Democrats	Chris Angell	944	21.0	+0.4
Labour	Ellen Robson	655	14.6	−18.8
Green	Hazel Johnson	590	13.2	+6.5
Majority		1,320		
Turnout			38.7	
Conservative hold		Swing		

Kings Langley division
Party	Candidate	Votes	%	±%
Conservative	Richard Roberts	2,810	58.4	+6.0
Liberal Democrats	Luc Briand	752	16.8	−3.4
Green	Martin Humphrey	449	10.0	+3.5
Labour	Jean Langdon	365	8.2	−12.5
BNP	Janet Price	279	6.2	+6.2
Majority		1,858		
Turnout		4,655	43.6	
Conservative hold		Swing		

Tring division
Party	Candidate	Votes	%	±%
Liberal Democrats	Nicholas Hollinghurst	3,090	52.4	+10.3
Conservative	Olive Conway	2,205	37.4	−4.2
Green	Rosalind Paul	404	6.9	+1.2
Labour	Tony Shaw	170	2.9	−7.3
Majority		885	15.0	
Turnout		5,869	48.7	−23.3
Liberal Democrats hold		Swing		

== East Herts (10 Seats) ==
All Saints 4 June 2009 East Herts District
Party	Candidate	Votes	%	±%
Conservative	Sally Newton	2,101	52.5	+6.3
Liberal Democrats	Andrew Porrer	1,240	31.0	+10.2
Labour	Jonathan Lansman	615	15.4	−11.4
Majority		861		
Turnout		3,956	40.9	
Conservative hold		Swing		

Bishop's Stortford East 4 June 2009 East Herts District
Party	Candidate	Votes	%	±%
Conservative	John Barfoot	1,943	46.8	+5.0
Liberal Democrats	Michael Wood	1,828	44.0	+5.3
Labour	Paul Schroder	340	8.2	−6.1
Majority		115		
Turnout		4,111	40.6	
Conservative hold		Swing		

Bishop's Stortford Rural 4 June 2009 East Herts District
Party	Candidate	Votes	%	±%
Conservative	Leanda Newlyn	2,377	58.9	+3.3
Liberal Democrats	Madeline Goldspink	1,256	31.1	+10.8
Labour	Stuart Purton	347	8.6	−8.0
Majority		1,121		
Turnout		3,980	38.6	
Conservative hold		Swing		

Bishop's Stortford West 4 June 2009 East Herts District
Party	Candidate	Votes	%	±%
Conservative	Duncan Peek	1,726	45.1	0.0
Liberal Democrats	Robert Taylor	993	26.0	−3.7
Green	Graham White	392	10.3	+5.3
Labour	John Battersby	389	10.2	−9.5
BNP	Ralph Ballard	307	8.0	=8.0
Majority		733		
Turnout		3,807	33.4	
Conservative hold		Swing		

Braughing 4 June 2009 East Herts District
Party	Candidate	Votes	%	±%
Conservative	Jane Pitman	2,467	62.7	+7.9
Liberal Democrats	Paul Moore	1,013	25.8	+8.2
Labour	Steven Stone	389	9.9	−11.1
Majority		1,454		
Turnout		3,869	39.4	
Conservative hold		Swing		

Hertford Rural 4 June 2009 East Herts District
Party	Candidate	Votes	%	±%
Conservative	Bryan Hammond	2,824	66.5	+6.9
Liberal Democrats	Catherine Edwards	992	23.4	+8.5
Labour	Robert Pinkham	359	8.5	−9.8
Majority		1,832		
Turnout		4,175	45.1	
Conservative hold		Swing		

St Andrews 4 June 2009 East Herts District
Party	Candidate	Votes	%	±%
Conservative	Peter Ruffles	2,253	56.0	+5.0
Independent	James Thornton	831	20.7	+20.7
Labour	Antony Bodley	499	12.4	−14.0
Liberal Democrats	Sean Shaw	416	10.3	−5.0
Majority		1,422		
Turnout		3,999	38.9	
Conservative hold		Swing		

Sawbridgeworth 4 June 2009 East Herts District
Party	Candidate	Votes	%	±%
Conservative	Roger Beeching	2,707	66.7	+9.7
Liberal Democrats	Leslie Pinnell	918	22.6	+4.9
Labour	Leslie Tillbrook	374	9.2	−9.7
Majority		1,789		
Turnout		3,999	37.8	
Conservative hold		Swing		

Ware North 4 June 2009 East Herts District
Party	Candidate	Votes	%	±%
Conservative	David Andrews	1,863	48.0	+2.4
Liberal Democrats	John Wing	1,245	32.1	+2.7
BNP	Brian Gildersleve	404	10.4	+10.4
Labour	John Stapleton	347	8.9	−10.2
Majority		618		
Turnout		3,859	37.6	
Conservative hold		Swing		

Ware South 4 June 2009 East Herts District
Party	Candidate	Votes	%	±%
Conservative	Rosemary Cheswright	2,249	56.4	+4.7
Liberal Democrats	Victoria Shaw	1,341	33.6	+14.0
Labour	Linda Harvey	332	8.3	−12.3
BNP	Dennis Corbett	Withdrawn	0.0	0.0
Majority		908		
Turnout		3,922	38.8	
Conservative hold		Swing		

== Hertsmere (7 Seats) ==
Borehamwood North 4 June 2009 Hertsmere District
Party	Candidate	Votes	%	±%
Conservative	Martin Heywood	1,488	38.7	+1.1
Labour	John Metcalf	1,100	28.6	−15.3
BNP	Jim Scott	536	13.9	+13.9
Liberal Democrats	Anita Gamble	470	12.2	−1.3
Independent	Frank Ward	219	5.7	+5.7
Majority		388		
Turnout		3,813	33.3	
Conservative gain from Labour		Swing		

Borehamwood South 4 June 2009 Hertsmere District
Party	Candidate	Votes	%	±%
Conservative	Morris Bright	1,770	52.0	+9.3
Labour	Richard Butler	915	26.9	−14.6
Liberal Democrats	Roger Kutchinsky	651	19.1	+3.9
Majority		855		
Turnout		3,336	31.5	
Conservative hold		Swing		

Bushey North 4 June 2009 Hertsmere District
Party	Candidate	Votes	%	±%
Conservative	Steve O'Brien	1,510	45.8	+12.9
Liberal Democrats	Lynne Hodgson	1,257	38.1	−8.5
Green	Arjuna Krishna - Das	277	8.4	+4.3
Labour	James Sowerbutts	234	7.1	−8.9
Majority		253		
Turnout		3,278	33.3	
Conservative gain from Liberal Democrats		Swing		

Bushey South 4 June 2009 Hertsmere District
Party	Candidate	Votes	%	±%
Conservative	Seamus Quilty	2,690	65.1	+8.8
Liberal Democrats	Robert Gamble	779	18.8	−5.1
Labour	David Bearfield	323	7.8	−7.2
Green	Edward Canfor - Dumas	320	7.7	+3.5
Majority		1,911		
Turnout		4,112	45.3	
Conservative hold		Swing		

Potters Bar East 4 June 2009 Hertsmere District
Party	Candidate	Votes	%	±%
Conservative	Eddie Roach	2,731	65.0	+7.8
Liberal Democrats	Peter Bonner	943	22.4	+2.3
Labour	James Fisher	466	11.1	−11.1
Majority		1,788		
Turnout		4,140	36.5	
Conservative hold		Swing		

Potters Bar West & Shenley 4 June 2009 Hertsmere District
Party	Candidate	Votes	%	±%
Conservative	John Usher	2,064	63.4	+10.0
Liberal Democrats	George Forrest	721	22.1	+1.0
Labour	Pierre - Paul Tengwo	406	12.5	−12.3
Majority		1,343		
Turnout		3,191	37.0	
Conservative hold		Swing		

Watling 4 June 2009 Hertsmere District
Party	Candidate	Votes	%	±%
Conservative	Caroline Clapper	3,342	71.2	+6.7
Liberal Democrats	Adam Richards - Gray	530	11.3	−6.9
Green	Jeannette McDermott	445	9.5	+9.5
Labour	Richard Kirk	353	7.5	−9.1
Majority		2,812		
Turnout		4,670	43.3	
Conservative hold		Swing		

== North Herts (9 Seats) ==
Hitchin North 4 June 2009 North Herts District
Party	Candidate	Votes	%	±%
Conservative	Ray Shakespeare - Smith	1,501	32.2	+1.0
Labour	David Billing	1,495	32.1	−8.1
Green	Giles Woodruff	804	17.3	+9.6
Liberal Democrats	Lisa Courts	655	14.1	−6.1
BNP	Herbert Clark	171	3.7	+3.7
Majority		6		
Turnout		4,626	41.1	
Conservative gain from Labour		Swing		

Hitchin Rural 4 June 2009 North Herts District
Party	Candidate	Votes	%	±%
Conservative	Nigel Brook	2,043	55.4	+6.5
Labour	Derek Sheard	562	15.2	−14.2
Liberal Democrats	Sal Jarvis	531	14.4	−0.8
Green	Bob Mardon	527	14.3	+8.1
Majority		1,481		
Turnout		3,663	40.8	
Conservative hold		Swing		

Hitchin South 4 June 2009 North Herts District
Party	Candidate	Votes	%	±%
Conservative	Derrick Ashley	2,258	49.3	+4.6
Liberal Democrats	Paul Clark	1,383	30.2	−5.7
Green	Chris Honey	556	12.2	+7.3
Labour	Clare Billing	350	7.6	−6.7
Majority		875		
Turnout		4,547	45.2	
Conservative hold		Swing		

Knebworth & Codicote 4 June 2009 North Herts District
Party	Candidate	Votes	%	±%
Conservative	Richard Thake	2,846	62.0	+6.9
Green	Harold Bland	652	14.2	+7.2
Liberal Democrats	Anthony Wilson	631	13.7	−5.6
Labour	Jonathan Holman	437	9.5	−8.8
Majority		2,194		
Turnout		4,566	42.0	
Conservative hold		Swing		

Letchworth East & Baldock 4 June 2009 North Herts District
Party	Candidate	Votes	%	±%
Conservative	Michael Muir	2,057	48.6	+7.9
Liberal Democrats	Marcus Keighley	817	19.3	+1.9
Labour	Peter Mardell	719	17.0	−18.9
Green	Eric Blakeley	611	14.4	+9.5
Majority		1,240		
Turnout		4,204	40.9	
Conservative hold		Swing		

Letchworth North West 4 June 2009 North Herts District
Party	Candidate	Votes	%	±%
Conservative	Terry Hone	1,157	34.6	+2.9
Labour	Nigel Agar	823	24.6	−18.9
Liberal Democrats	Martin Penny	474	14.2	−4.8
Green	Rosemary Bland	353	10.6	+5.4
English Democrat	Charles Vickers	293	8.8	+8.8
BNP	Barry Gillespie	217	6.5	+6.5
Majority		334		
Turnout		3,317	36.4	
Conservative gain from Labour		Swing		

Letchworth South 4 June 2009 North Herts District
Party	Candidate	Votes	%	±%
Conservative	Keith Emsall	2,385	51.4	+8.9
Liberal Democrats	Julia Winter	980	21.1	−5.2
Labour	Nicholas Kissen	618	13.3	−12.8
Green	James Drew	613	13.2	+8.5
Majority		1,405		
Turnout		4,596	43.1	
Conservative hold		Swing		

North Herts Rural 4 June 2009 North Herts District
Party	Candidate	Votes	%	±%
Conservative	Tony Hunter	2,281	44.3	0.0
Liberal Democrats	Ian Simpson	2,208	42.8	+3.1
Green	Felix Power	379	7.4	+3.7
Labour	Ken Garland	255	4.9	−7.1
Majority		73		
Turnout		5,123	44.4	
Conservative hold		Swing		

Royston 4 June 2009 North Herts District
Party	Candidate	Votes	%	±%
Conservative	Fiona Hill	2,395	52.2	+9.0
Liberal Democrats	Caroline Coates	1,179	25.7	−6.5
Green	Karen Harmel	558	12.2	+7.5
Labour	Carlo Zambonini	421	9.2	−10.4
Majority		1,216		
Turnout		4,553	37.6	
Conservative hold		Swing		

== St Albans (10 Seats) ==
Harpenden North East 4 June 2009 St Albans District
Party	Candidate	Votes	%	±%
Conservative	Bernard Lloyd	2,434	54.5	+8.0
Liberal Democrats	Jeff Phillips	1,204	27.0	−6.8
Green	Annett Tate	489	10.9	+5.2
Labour	Rosemary Ross	306	6.9	−6.8
Majority		1,230		
Turnout		4,433	42.3	
Conservative hold		Swing		

Harpenden South West 4 June 2009 St Albans District
Party	Candidate	Votes	%	±%
Conservative	Teresa Heritage	3,275	65.6	+9.9
Liberal Democrats	Albert Moses	929	18.6	−6.8
Green	Margaret Grover	473	9.5	+3.4
Labour	Richard Lane	289	5.8	−6.0
Majority		2,346		
Turnout		4,966	45.6	
Conservative hold		Swing		

St Albans Central 4 June 2009 St Albans District
Party	Candidate	Votes	%	±%
Liberal Democrats	Chris White	2,034	45.6	+3.2
Conservative	Seema Kennedy	1,095	24.6	+0.5
Green	Simon Grover	786	17.6	+9.6
Labour	Lynette Warren	524	11.8	−11.7
Majority		939		
Turnout		4,439	43.6	
Liberal Democrats hold		Swing		

St Albans East 4 June 2009 St Albans District
Party	Candidate	Votes	%	±%
Liberal Democrats	Rob Prowse	1,914	45.1	+11.2
Conservative	Chris Baker	1,199	28.2	+2.4
Green	Graham Ward	583	13.7	+8.6
Labour	Jill Gipps	516	12.2	−18.7
Majority		715		
Turnout		4,212	41.7	
Liberal Democrats hold		Swing		

St Albans North 4 June 2009 St Albans District
Party	Candidate	Votes	%	±%
Liberal Democrats	Allan Witherick	1,898	38.6	+6.5
Conservative	Salih Gaygusuz	1,650	33.5	+1.6
Labour	Ruairi McCourt	701	14.3	−14.0
Green	Naomi Love	626	12.7	+5.5
Majority		248		
Turnout		4,875	46.2	
Liberal Democrats hold		Swing		

St Albans Rural 4 June 2009 St Albans District
Party	Candidate	Votes	%	±%
Conservative	Maxine Crawley	2,105	45.0	+2.5
Liberal Democrats	Judy Shardlow	1,953	41.7	+1.5
Green	Peter Eggleston	420	9.0	+3.1
Labour	Linda Spiri	172	3.7	−7.3
Majority		152		
Turnout		4,650	49.8	
Conservative hold		Swing		

St Albans South 4 June 2009 St Albans District
Party	Candidate	Votes	%	±%
Liberal Democrats	Mike Ellis	1,902	39.1	+3.7
Conservative	Robert Clarkson	1,510	31.1	−4.9
Labour	Janet Smith	743	15.3	−12.5
Green	Thomas Hardy	661	13.6	+13.6
Majority		392		
Turnout		4,816	47.2	
Liberal Democrats gain from Conservative		Swing		

St Stephen's 4 June 2009 St Albans District
Party	Candidate	Votes	%	±%
Liberal Democrats	Aislinn Lee	2,075	43.8	−0.3
Conservative	Matthew Peck	2,029	42.9	+4.2
Green	Jack Easton	336	7.1	+4.3
Labour	Janet Blackwell	266	5.6	−8.5
Majority		46		
Turnout		4,706	45.7	
Liberal Democrats hold		Swing		

Sandridge 4 June 2009 St Albans District
Party	Candidate	Votes	%	±%
Liberal Democrats	Geoff Churchard	1,972	47.6	+7.9
Conservative	Beric Read	1,551	37.4	−0.1
Green	Gillian Mills	388	9.4	+4.6
Labour	Benjamin Dearman	200	4.8	−12.9
Majority		421		
Turnout		4,111	47.4	
Liberal Democrats hold		Swing		

The Colneys 4 June 2009 St Albans District
Party	Candidate	Votes	%	±%
Liberal Democrats	Chris Brazier	1,716	41.7	+20.6
Conservative	Timothy Jones	1,300	31.6	−6.0
Labour	Dominic Benson	519	12.6	−24.6
Green	Lucy Eggleston	312	7.6	+3.9
BNP	Mark Gerrard	251	6.1	+6.1
Majority		416		
Turnout		4,098	37.5	
Liberal Democrats gain from Conservative		Swing		

== Stevenage (6 Seats) ==
Bedwell 4 June 2009 Stevenage District
Party	Candidate	Votes	%	±%
Labour	Sharon Taylor	1,256	38.3	−16.7
Conservative	Leslie Clark	763	23.3	−1.4
UKIP	Terry Tompkins	490	14.9	+14.9
Liberal Democrats	Gareth Steiner	342	10.4	−9.0
BNP	Thomas Godfrey	243	7.4	+7.4
Green	Ashley Walker	181	5.5	+5.5
Majority		493		
Turnout		3,275	36.3	
Labour hold		Swing		

Broadwater 4 June 2009 Stevenage District
Party	Candidate	Votes	%	±%
Conservative	Matthew Hurst	1,066	31.9	+1.6
Labour	Sherma Batson	948	28.4	−15.1
UKIP	Roy Worden	507	15.2	+15.2
Liberal Democrats	Ralph Baskerville	422	12.6	−7.6
BNP	Arthur Medley	196	5.9	+5.9
Green	Heidi Mollart - Griffin	183	5.5	+5.5
Majority		118		
Turnout		3,322	37.5	
Conservative gain from Labour		Swing		

Chells 4 June 2009 Stevenage District
Party	Candidate	Votes	%	±%
Liberal Democrats	Robin Parker	1,444	37.3	−5.2
Conservative	Matthew Wyatt	850	21.9	−1.6
Labour	Bhavna Joshi	781	20.2	−13.4
UKIP	Julie Seddon	411	10.6	+10.6
BNP	Cheryl Peers	233	6.0	+6.0
Green	Ann De Bock	142	3.7	+3.7
Majority		594		
Turnout		3,861	39.9	
Liberal Democrats hold		Swing		

Old Stevenage 4 June 2009 Stevenage District
Party	Candidate	Votes	%	±%
Conservative	James Fraser	1,708	36.0	+0.4
Labour	Michael Downing	1,501	31.6	−9.5
UKIP	Rik Seddon	515	10.9	+10.9
Liberal Democrats	Clive Hearmon	484	10.2	−6.8
Green	Stuart Madgin	298	6.3	+0.4
BNP	Reginald Norgan	219	4.6	+4.6
Majority		207		
Turnout		4,725	40.9	
Conservative gain from Labour		Swing		

St Nicholas 4 June 2009 Stevenage District
Party	Candidate	Votes	%	±%
Conservative	Philip Bibby	1,173	29.9	−0.8
Labour	David Cullen	1,114	28.4	−15.9
UKIP	Marion Mason	462	11.8	+11.8
Liberal Democrats	Graham Snell	441	11.2	−13.2
English Democrat	John Cooper	299	7.6	+7.6
BNP	Mark Ralph	213	5.4	+5.4
Green	William Berrington	208	5.3	+5.3
Majority		59		
Turnout		3,910	35.5	
Conservative gain from Labour		Swing		

Shephall 4 June 2009 Stevenage District
Party	Candidate	Votes	%	±%
Labour	John Lloyd	1,026	32.6	−18.1
Conservative	Christine Hurst	784	24.9	−3.1
UKIP	Bob Layson	400	12.7	+12.7
Liberal Democrats	Nicholas Baskerville	380	12.1	−8.6
BNP	Terence Savage	197	6.3	+6.3
Green	William Hoyes	193	6.1	+6.1
English Democrat	Carl Cooper	147	4.7	+4.7
Majority		242		
Turnout		3,127	34.3	
Labour hold		Swing		

== Three Rivers (6 Seats) ==
Abbots Langley 4 June 2009 Three Rivers District
Party	Candidate	Votes	%	±%
Liberal Democrats	Paul Goggins	2,976	58.9	+4.9
Conservative	Fiona Guest	1,233	24.4	−0.1
Labour	Joanne Cox	451	8.9	−8.6
BNP	Seamus Dunne	353	7.0	+7.0
Majority		1,743		
Turnout		5,013	36.9	
Liberal Democrats hold		Swing		

Chorleywood 4 June 2009 Three Rivers District
Party	Candidate	Votes	%	±%
Conservative	Chris Hayward	3,096	62.3	+12.1
Liberal Democrats	Chris Brearley	1,662	33.5	−3.9
Labour	Stephen Cox	174	3.5	−4.4
Majority		1,434		
Turnout		4,932	49.4	
Conservative hold		Swing		

Croxley 4 June 2009 Three Rivers District
Party	Candidate	Votes	%	±%
Liberal Democrats	Steve Drury	2,156	55.1	+8.5
Conservative	Mark Engelfield	1,416	36.2	+3.3
Labour	David Wynne - Jones	299	7.6	−8.4
Majority		740		
Turnout		3,871	40.2	
Liberal Democrats hold		Swing		

Oxhey Park 4 June 2009 Three Rivers District
Party	Candidate	Votes	%	±%
Conservative	Frances Button	2,534	48.7	−0.3
Liberal Democrats	Chris Lloyd	2,099	40.3	+7.7
BNP	Roger Holmes	284	5.5	+5.5
Labour	Brendan O'Brien	257	4.9	−9.3
Majority		435		
Turnout		5,174	47.1	
Conservative hold		Swing		

Rickmansworth division
Party	Candidate	Votes	%	±%
Conservative	Barbara Lamb	2,713	55.8	+6.0
Liberal Democrats	Pat Howell	1,785	36.7	+4.8
Labour	Michael Jones	287	5.9	−7.8
Majority		928	19.1	
Turnout		4,785	37.7	−29.5
Conservative hold		Swing		

South Oxhey division
Party	Candidate	Votes	%	±%
BNP	Deirdre Gates	783	29.2	+29.2
Labour	Nena Spellen	756	28.2	−18.4
Conservative	Yessica Gould	671	25.0	+3.4
Liberal Democrats	Mary Connolly	446	16.6	−8.8
Majority		27	1.0	
Turnout		2,656	30.3	−22.7
BNP gain from Labour		Swing		

== Watford (6 Seats) ==
Callowland Leggatts 4 June 2009 Watford District
Party	Candidate	Votes	%	±%
Green	Ian Brandon	1,326	36.0	+7.9
Liberal Democrats	Zaheer Ahmed	955	25.9	+2.2
Conservative	Amanda Grimstone	925	25.1	+7.0
Labour	Omar Ismail	430	11.7	−14.8
Majority		371		
Turnout		3,636	35.4	
Green hold		Swing		

Central Oxhey 4 June 2009 Watford District
Party	Candidate	Votes	%	±%
Liberal Democrats	Stephen Giles - Medhurst	1,783	51.1	+5.9
Conservative	Sarah Son	830	23.8	+0.3
Labour	Ann Akubue	484	13.9	−10.7
Green	Alex MacGregor Mason	374	10.7	+4.5
Majority		953		
Turnout		3,471	32.3	
Liberal Democrats hold		Swing		

Meriden Tudor 4 June 2009 Watford District
Party	Candidate	Votes	%	±%
Liberal Democrats	Audrey Oaten	1,560	43.5	+4.5
Conservative	Richard Southern	988	27.6	+1.7
Labour	Joanna Grindrod	456	12.7	−17.6
BNP	Danny Seabrook	292	8.1	+8.1
Green	Helen Wynne	269	7.5	+3.2
Majority		572		
Turnout		3,565	35.2	
Liberal Democrats hold		Swing		

Nascot Park 4 June 2009 Watford District
Party	Candidate	Votes	%	±%
Liberal Democrats	Mark Watkin	2,329	46	+7.7
Conservative	Malcolm Meerabux	2,079	41.0	−0.3
Green	Sally Ivins	338	6.7	+2.1
Labour	Mohammed Riaz	290	5.7	−9.7
Majority		250		
Turnout		5,036	45.5	
Liberal Democrats gain from Conservative		Swing		

Vicarage Hollywell 4 June 2009 Watford District
Party	Candidate	Votes	%	±%
Labour	Nigel Bell	2,564	58.2	+16.2
Liberal Democrats	Susan Gaszczak	1,064	24.1	−11.8
Conservative	Dave Ealey	429	9.7	−6.7
Green	Doug Lawson	306	6.9	+2.1
Majority		1,500		
Turnout		4,363	38.4	
Labour hold		Swing		

Woodside Stanborough 4 June 2009 Watford District
Party	Candidate	Votes	%	±%
Liberal Democrats	Derek Scudder	1,838	54.3	+7.4
Conservative	Jonathan Cordell	795	23.5	+1.7
Labour	John Young	422	12.5	−14.5
Green	Iain Wadey	301	809	+5.1
Majority		1,043		
Turnout		3,356	32.5	
Liberal Democrats hold		Swing		

== Welwyn Hatfield (7 Seats) ==
Haldens 4 June 2009 Welwyn Hatfield District
Party	Candidate	Votes	%	±%
Conservative	Sarah Johnstone	1,849	50.1	+12.9
Labour	Jacqui Russell	727	19.7	−20.8
Liberal Democrats	Frank Marsh	568	15.4	−0.6
Green	Adrian Toole	512	13.9	+8.2
Majority		1,122		
Turnout		3,656	36.7	
Conservative gain from Labour		Swing		

Handside & Peartree 4 June 2009 Welwyn Hatfield District
Party	Candidate	Votes	%	±%
Liberal Democrats	Malcolm Cowan	1,804	42.6	+8.9
Conservative	Fiona Thomson	1,669	39.4	+6.9
Labour	Dean Milliken	426	10.1	−23.1
Green	Berenice Dowlen	316	7.5	+7.5
Majority		135		
Turnout		4,215	41.7	
Liberal Democrats hold		Swing		

Hatfield North 4 June 2009 Welwyn Hatfield District
Party	Candidate	Votes	%	±%
Conservative	Clare Berry	2,165	42.1	+3.8
Labour	Maureen Cook	1,164	22.6	−15.6
Liberal Democrats	Nigel Quinton	1,062	20.6	+3.0
Green	Graham Laverick	501	9.7	+4.4
Independent	Tony Wickenden	215	4.2	+4.2
Majority		1,001		
Turnout		5,107	32.9	
Conservative hold		Swing		

Hatfield Rural 4 June 2009 Welwyn Hatfield District
Party	Candidate	Votes	%	±%
Conservative	Bill Storey	3,338	75.5	+4.3
Labour	Cathy Watson	309	7.0	−5.0
Liberal Democrats	Hazel Laming	387	8.7	−2.3
Green	Claire Weetman	363	8.2	+3.0
Majority		2,951		
Turnout		46.9	4,397	
Conservative hold		Swing		

Hatfield South 4 June 2009 Welwyn Hatfield District
Party	Candidate	Votes	%	±%
Conservative	Stuart Pile	1,577	46.2	+4.2
Labour	Colin Croft	696	20.4	−17.1
Liberal Democrats	Simon Archer	592	17.4	+1.2
BNP	Christopher Francis	283	8.3	+8.3
Green	Colin Jeffery	233	6.8	+3.1
Majority		881		
Turnout		3,381	34.7	
Conservative hold		Swing		

Welwyn 4 June 2009 Welwyn Hatfield District
Party	Candidate	Votes	%	±%
Conservative	Richard Smith	3,309	62.2	+8.7
Liberal Democrats	Ian Skidmore	818	15.4	−2.4
Green	Susan Groom	599	11.3	+5.2
Labour	Tony Crump	573	10.8	−11.2
Majority		2,491		
Turnout		5,299	46.1	
Conservative hold		Swing		

Welwyn Garden City South 4 June 2009 Welwyn Hatfield District
Party	Candidate	Votes	%	±%
Conservative	Steven Markiewicz	1,443	41.1	+6.4
Labour	Susan Jones	779	22.2	−21.5
Green	Jill Weston	775	22.1	+16.5
Liberal Democrats	Louise Lotz	490	13.9	−1.3
Majority		664		
Turnout		3,487	34.2	
Conservative gain from Labour		Swing		
