= 2017 Hertfordshire County Council election =

2017 UK local government election

← 2013	4 May 2017	2021 →

All 78 seats to Hertfordshire County Council 40 seats needed for a majority
- Turnout: 34.1%
	First party	Second party	Third party
Party	Conservative	Liberal Democrats	Labour
Seats before	46	16	15
Seats won	51	18	9
Seat change	▲5	▲2	▼6
Popular vote	133,577	73,054	59,774
Percentage	45.9%	25.1%	20.5%
Swing	▲8.1%	▲8.1%	▼0.8%
- Map showing the results of the 2017 Hertfordshire County Council elections.

- Council composition after the election.
Council control before election
Conservative
Council control after election
Conservative

The 2017 Hertfordshire County Council election took place on 4 May 2017 as part of the 2017 local elections in the United Kingdom. All 78 councillors were elected from electoral divisions which returned one county councillor each by first-past-the-post voting for a four-year term of office.

Boundary changes to the electoral divisions took effect at this election after a review of the county by the Local Government Boundary Commission for England increasing the number of seats on the council from 77 to 78.

== Election results ==
Hertfordshire County Council Election Results 2017
Party	Seats	Gains	Losses	Net gain/loss	Seats %	Votes %	Votes	+/−
Conservative	51			+5	65.4	45.9	133,577	+8.1
Liberal Democrats	18			+2	23.1	25.1	73,054	+8.1
Labour	9			−6	11.5	20.5	59,774	−0.8
Green	0			0	0.0	4.3	11,630	
Independent	0			0	0.0	0.4	1,271	
TUSC	0			0	0.0	0.2	448	
UKIP	0			0	0.0	4.1	11,041	

== Results by electoral division ==
=== Broxbourne (6 Seats) ===
Cheshunt Central
Party	Candidate	Votes	%	±%
Conservative	Dave Hewitt*	1,893	61.4	+11.5
Labour	Ian Dust	746	24.2	+7.0
UKIP	Sidney Pratt	297	9.6	−16.2
Liberal Democrats	Lloyd Harris	145	4.7	−2.2
Majority		1,147		
Turnout		3,082	25.4	+2.7
Conservative hold		Swing		

Flamstead End & Turnford
Party	Candidate	Votes	%	±%
Conservative	Mark Mills-Bishop	1,991	64.8	+15.8
Labour	Tony Renwick	545	17.7	+1.3
UKIP	Anthony Faulkner	390	12.7	−18.9
Liberal Democrats	David Parry	143	4.7	+1.9
Majority		1,446		
Turnout		3,073	25.3	+5.6
Conservative hold		Swing		

Goffs Oak & Bury Green
Party	Candidate	Votes	%	±%
Conservative	Robert Gordon*	2,108	64.9	+7.7
Labour	Selina Elizabeth Norgrove	572	17.6	+2.3
UKIP	Stephen James Coster	369	11.4	−14.0
Liberal Democrats	Adam Edwards	190	5.8	+5.8
Majority		1,536		
Turnout		3,248	26.8	+4.1
Conservative hold		Swing		

Hoddesdon North
Party	Candidate	Votes	%	±%
Conservative	Tim Hutchings*	2,053	59.7	+18.3
Labour	Mario Angeli	544	15.8	±0.0
UKIP	David Steven Platt	448	13.0	−25.3
Liberal Democrats	Brendan Paul Wyer	224	6.5	+2.5
Green	Nicholas John Cox	163	4.7	+4.7
Majority		1,509		
Turnout		3,440	28.0	+2.8
Conservative hold		Swing		

Hoddesdon South
Party	Candidate	Votes	%	±%
Conservative	Paul Vincent Mason	2,469	65.5	+17.1
Labour Co-op	Janet Ann Wareham	434	11.5	−2.5
UKIP	Evelyn Jane Faulkner	348	9.2	−29.6
Liberal Democrats	Sara Elizabeth Mihajlovic	298	7.9	+1.6
Green	Sally Ann Kemp	214	5.7	+5.7
Majority		2,035		
Turnout		3,772	32.3	+7.8
Conservative hold		Swing		

Waltham Cross
Party	Candidate	Votes	%	±%
Conservative	Dee Hart*	1,712	53.9	+7.0
Labour	Bektas Yavuz	1,184	37.3	+7.1
Liberal Democrats	Michael Wood	266	8.4	+8.4
Majority		528		
Turnout		3,177	26.5	+2.8
Conservative hold		Swing		

=== Dacorum (10 Seats) ===
Berkhamsted division
Party	Candidate	Votes	%	±%
Conservative	Ian Reay*	2,018	41.4	−3.7
Liberal Democrats	Nigel Taylor	1,922	39.4	+34.2
Labour	Sian Patricia Cusack	422	8.7	−2.1
Green	Paul Gregory De Hoest	410	8.4	−2.8
UKIP	Amy Anderson	100	2.1	−8.7
Majority		96		
Turnout		4,876	41.2	+12.5
Conservative hold		Swing		

Bridgewater division
Party	Candidate	Votes	%	±%
Conservative	Terry Douris	2,226	57.7	+2.8
Liberal Democrats	Sally Symington	1,018	26.4	+18.6
Labour	Luke Jordan	432	11.2	+0.1
UKIP	John Statham	170	4.4	−17.7
Majority		1,208		
Turnout			36.7	
Conservative hold		Swing		

Hemel Hempstead East division
Party	Candidate	Votes	%	±%
Conservative	Andrew Derek Williams*	1,946	62.0	
Labour	Barbara Brucelia	720	22.9	
Liberal Democrats	Anna Wellings Purvis	291	9.3	
Green	Mark Rutherford	178	5.7	
Majority		1,226		
Turnout			30.1	
Conservative hold		Swing		

Hemel Hempstead North East division
Party	Candidate	Votes	%	±%
Conservative	Colette Wyatt-Lowe*	1,550	55.6	
Labour	Stefan Fisher	664	23.8	
Liberal Democrats	Sammy Barry	243	8.7	
UKIP	Silvi Sutherland	232	8.3	
Green	Paul Sandford	95	3.4	
Majority		886		
Turnout			29.6	
Conservative hold		Swing		

Hemel Hempstead North West division
Party	Candidate	Votes	%	±%
Conservative	Fiona Guest	1,966	56.0	
Labour	Mandi Tattershall	845	24.1	
Liberal Democrats	Steve Wilson	322	9.2	
UKIP	James Mostyn Froggatt	191	5.4	
Green	Jane Cousins	185	5.3	
Majority		1,121		
Turnout			30.9	
Conservative hold		Swing		

Hemel Hempstead South East division
Party	Candidate	Votes	%	±%
Conservative	Tina Howard	1,397	38.3	
Labour	Ijlal Malik	1,019	28.0	
Independent	Jan Maddern	818	22.5	
Liberal Democrats	Jack McActeer	219	6.0	
UKIP	Bruce John Clark	176	4.8	
Majority		378		
Turnout			31.1	
Conservative hold		Swing		

Hemel Hempstead St Pauls division
Party	Candidate	Votes	%	±%
Liberal Democrats	Ron Tindall*	1,413	45.6	
Conservative	Maxine Susan Crawley	811	26.2	
Labour	Gary Michael Cook	653	21.1	
UKIP	Ellie Naidoo	210	6.8	
Majority		602		
Turnout			29.2	
Liberal Democrats hold		Swing		

Hemel Hempstead Town division
Party	Candidate	Votes	%	±%
Conservative	William James Wyatt-Lowe*	1,733	51.5	
Labour	Ian Patrick	711	21.1	
Liberal Democrats	Iain Smith	684	20.3	
Green	Sherief Mamoun Hassan	226	6.7	
Majority		1,022		
Turnout			31.9	
Conservative hold		Swing		

Kings Langley division
Party	Candidate	Votes	%	±%
Conservative	Richard Roberts*	2,381	66.5	
Labour	Michael Barton	444	12.4	
Liberal Democrats	Christopher Townsend	413	11.5	
Green	Wiebke Carr	201	5.6	
UKIP	Shirley Ann Pratt	136	3.8	
Majority		1,937		
Turnout			33.9	
Conservative hold		Swing		

Tring division
Party	Candidate	Votes	%	±%
Liberal Democrats	Nick Hollinghurst*	2,617	49.7	
Conservative	Olive Conway	1,820	34.5	
Labour	Colin Barry Phillips	360	6.8	
Green	Charlotte Susan Pardy	256	4.9	
UKIP	Mark Anderson	207	3.9	
Majority		797		
Turnout			43.3	
Liberal Democrats hold		Swing		

=== East Hertfordshire (10 Seats) ===
Bishop's Stortford East East Herts District
Party	Candidate	Votes	%	±%
Conservative	John Fraser Wyllie	1,517	42.1	
Liberal Democrats	Mione Goldspink	1437	39.9	
Labour	Val Cooke	458	12.7	
Green	Madela Baddock	179	5.0	
Majority		82		
Turnout			33.5	
Conservative hold		Swing		

Bishop's Stortford Rural East Herts District
Party	Candidate	Votes	%	±%
Conservative	Graham McAndrew*	2,090	60.5	
Liberal Democrats	Calvin Laurie Horner	516	14.9	
Labour	Alex Young	388	11.2	
UKIP	William Matthew Compton	301	8.7	
Green	David Rupert Woollcombe	151	4.4	
Majority		1574		
Turnout			33.9	
Conservative hold		Swing		

Bishop's Stortford West East Herts District
Party	Candidate	Votes	%	±%
Conservative	Colin Bernard Woodward*	1,894	52.2	
Labour	Riccardo La Torre	747	20.6	
Liberal Democrats	Bob Taylor	604	16.6	
UKIP	Robert Joseph Patterson	227	6.3	
Green	Alexandra Ancilla Daar	153	4.2	
Majority		1147		
Turnout			31.5	
Conservative hold		Swing		

Buntingford East Herts District
Party	Candidate	Votes	%	±%
Conservative	Jeff Jones	2,281	68.6	
Labour	Steven Charles Stone	391	11.8	
Liberal Democrats	Carole Vivienne Luck	289	8.7	
UKIP	Darren Cowell	204	6.1	
Green	Tabitha Jane Evans	156	4.7	
Majority		1890		
Turnout			32.3	
Conservative hold		Swing		

Hertford All Saints East Herts District
Party	Candidate	Votes	%	±%
Conservative	Andrew Stevenson*	1,908	54.9	
Labour	Veronica Elizabeth Fraser	797	22.9	
Liberal Democrats	John William Wiggett	492	14.1	
Green	Ray Bomber	272	7.8	
Majority		1111		
Turnout			33.7	
Conservative hold		Swing		

Hertford Rural East Herts District
Party	Candidate	Votes	%	±%
Conservative	Ken Crofton*	2,947	72.6	
Labour	Catherine Anne Henderson	430	10.6	
Liberal Democrats	Katie Beaujeux	387	9.5	
Green	Lydia Helen Somerville	291	7.2	
Majority		2517		
Turnout			37.7	
Conservative hold		Swing		

Hertford St Andrews 2 May 2013 East Herts District
Party	Candidate	Votes	%	±%
Conservative	Bob Deering	1,650	50.8	
Labour	Rachel Louise Houghton	855	26.3	
Liberal Democrats	Andrew James Robert Porrer	477	14.7	
Green	Tony Tarrega	263	8.1	
Majority		795		
Turnout			29.2	
Conservative hold		Swing		

Sawbridgeworth 2 May 2013 East Herts District
Party	Candidate	Votes	%	±%
Conservative	Eric Henry Buckmaster	2,375	61.8	
Liberal Democrats	Julia Mary Davies	532	13.8	
Labour	Sotirios Adamopoulos	454	11.8	
UKIP	Michael John Shaw	291	7.6	
Green	Isabelle Mary Robinson	188	4.9	
Majority		1843		
Turnout			31.5	
Conservative hold		Swing		

Ware North 2 May 2013 East Herts District
Party	Candidate	Votes	%	±%
Conservative	David Andrews*	1,771	55.2	
Liberal Democrats	John Francis William Wing	598	18.6	
Labour	Murray Michael Andrew Sackwild	439	13.7	
UKIP	Blaise Hugo Archdale Morris	197	6.1	
Green	Carolyn Westlake	197	6.1	
Majority		1173		
Turnout			30.4	
Conservative hold		Swing		

Ware South East Herts District
Party	Candidate	Votes	%	±%
Conservative	Jonathan Stephen Kaye	1,590	64.0	
Liberal Democrats	Sean Michael Shaw	458	14.3	
Labour	Hani Latif	444	13.9	
Green	Glen Leslie Baker	242	7.6	
Majority		1590		
Turnout			28.9	
Conservative hold		Swing		

=== Hertsmere (7 seats) ===
Borehamwood North
Party	Candidate	Votes	%	±%
Conservative	Susan Brown	1,406	47.6	
Labour	Leon Reefe	1,133	38.4	
UKIP	Lee Greenfield	238	8.1	
Liberal Democrats	Anne Diamond	156	5.3	
TUSC	Mark Pickersgill	18	0.6	
Majority				
Turnout		2,951	26.9	
Conservative win (new seat)				

Borehamwood South
Party	Candidate	Votes	%	±%
Conservative	Alan Plancey	1,452	47.5	
Labour	Michelle Vince	1,135	37.1	
UKIP	David Appleby	263	8.6	
Liberal Democrats	Edward Perchick	210	6.9	
Majority				
Turnout		3,060	28.7	
Conservative win (new seat)				

Bushey North
Party	Candidate	Votes	%	±%
Conservative	Jane West	1,402	47.6	
Liberal Democrats	Gemma Moore	930	31.6	
Labour	Zain Bilgrami	377	12.8	
UKIP	Patricia Sheppard	134	4.5	
Green	Edward Canfor-Dumas	104	3.5	
Majority				
Turnout		2,947		
Conservative win (new seat)				

Bushey South
Party	Candidate	Votes	%	±%
Conservative	Seamus Quilty	2,407	69.7	
Liberal Democrats	Jerry Evans	548	15.9	
Labour	Ella Rose	382	11.1	
Green	Nicolas Winston	117	3.4	
Majority				
Turnout		3,454	33.4	
Conservative win (new seat)				

Potters Bar East
Party	Candidate	Votes	%	±%
Conservative	John Graham	2,229	60.5	
Labour	John Doolan	694	18.8	
UKIP	Vikki Johnson	293	8.0	
Liberal Democrats	Jack Baldwin	257	7.0	
Green	Frank Jeffs	212	5.8	
Majority				
Turnout		3,685	31.0	
Conservative win (new seat)				

Potters Bar West & Shenley
Party	Candidate	Votes	%	±%
Conservative	Morris Bright	1,912	60.4	
Labour	Richard Butler	694	21.9	
Liberal Democrats	Matt Farrell	322	10.2	
UKIP	David Hoy	238	7.5	
Majority				
Turnout		3,166	99.7	
Conservative win (new seat)				

Watling
Party	Candidate	Votes	%	±%
Conservative	Caroline Clapper	2,889	77.5	
Labour	Peter Halsey	344	9.2	
Liberal Democrats	Saif al-Saadoon	318	8.5	
Green	Jessica Wand	175	4.7	
Majority				
Turnout		3,726	32.8	
Conservative win (new seat)				

=== North Hertfordshire (9 seats) ===
Baldock & Letchworth East
Party	Candidate	Votes	%	±%
Conservative	Michael Muir	1,850	48.7	
Labour	Anne Holland	767	20.2	
Liberal Democrats	Richard Winter	716	18.8	
Green	Rosemary Bland	243	6.4	
UKIP	Brian Alderton	223	5.9	
Majority				
Turnout		3,799	34.9	
Conservative win (new seat)				

Hitchin North
Party	Candidate	Votes	%	±%
Labour	Judi Billing	2,223	51.2	
Conservative	David Leal-Bennett	1,215	28.0	
Liberal Democrats	Sam Collins	550	12.7	
Green	Mario May	321	7.4	
TUSC	Barbara Clare	35	0.8	
Majority				
Turnout		4,344	37.3	
Labour win (new seat)				

Hitchin Rural
Party	Candidate	Votes	%	±%
Conservative	David Barnard	1,970	56.9	
Labour	Neil Sankey	729	21.1	
Liberal Democrats	Carol Stanier	426	12.3	
Green	Mary Marshall	338	9.8	
Majority				
Turnout		3,463	34.0	
Conservative win (new seat)				

Hitchin South
Party	Candidate	Votes	%	±%
Conservative	Derrick Ashley	1,884	41.4	
Liberal Democrats	Paul Clark	1,770	38.9	
Labour	Angela Griggs	618	13.6	
Green	Diana Newson	274	6.0	
Majority				
Turnout		4,546	42.5	
Conservative win (new seat)				

Knebworth & Codicote
Party	Candidate	Votes	%	±%
Conservative	Richard Thake	2,090	55.9	
Liberal Democrats	Terry Tyler	934	25.0	
Labour	Richard Downey	494	13.2	
Green	Rebecca Leek	219	5.9	
Majority				
Turnout		3,737	37.3	
Conservative win (new seat)				

Letchworth North
Party	Candidate	Votes	%	±%
Conservative	Simon Bloxham	1,753	43.2	
Labour	Doug Swanney	1,646	40.6	
Liberal Democrats	Sean Prendergast	356	8.8	
Green	Elizabeth Hancock	301	7.4	
Majority				
Turnout		4,056	34.2	
Conservative win (new seat)				

Letchworth South
Party	Candidate	Votes	%	±%
Conservative	Terry Hone	2,125	51.5	
Labour	Jean Andrews	874	21.2	
Liberal Democrats	Barry Neale	707	17.1	
UKIP	Sidney Start	215	5.2	
Green	Maryla Hart	202	4.9	
Majority				
Turnout		4,123	36.9	
Conservative win (new seat)				

Royston East & Ermine
Party	Candidate	Votes	%	±%
Conservative	Fiona Hill	2,244	58.0	
Liberal Democrats	Hugh Parker	633	16.3	
Labour	John Rees	479	12.4	
Independent	Mark Hughes	324	8.4	
Green	Karen Harmel	192	5.0	
Majority				
Turnout		3,872	35.0	
Conservative win (new seat)				

Royston West & Rural
Party	Candidate	Votes	%	±%
Liberal Democrats	Steve Jarvis	1,976	43.2	
Conservative	Tony Hunter	1,914	41.8	
Labour	Kenneth Garland	380	8.3	
UKIP	Christopher Arquati	162	3.5	
Green	Dean Cartwright	145	3.2	
Majority				
Turnout		4,577	38.9	
Liberal Democrats win (new seat)				

=== St Albans (10 seats) ===
Harpenden North East
Party	Candidate	Votes	%	±%
Conservative	David Williams	2,157	53.0	−0.8
Liberal Democrats	Paul De Kort	1,098	26.9	+9.3
Labour	Linda Spiri	537	13.2	−1.9
Green	Lydia El-Khouri	172	4.2	−8.6
UKIP	Lester MacKenzie	103	2.5	N/A
Majority				
Turnout		4,067	37.0	
Conservative hold		Swing		

Harpenden South West
Party	Candidate	Votes	%	±%
Conservative	Teresa Heritage	2,882	62.4	−8.0
Liberal Democrats	Jeffrey Kyndon	1,032	22.3	+9.8
Labour	George Fraser	448	9.7	−2.2
Green	Tim Robinson	168	3.6	−2.9
UKIP	Colin Donald	84	1.8	N/A
Majority				
Turnout			41.5	
Conservative hold		Swing		

Harpenden Rural
Party	Candidate	Votes	%	±%
Conservative	Annie Brewster	2,796	62.2	N/A
Liberal Democrats	Sharon Hollingsworth	868	19.3	N/A
Labour	Anthony Neville	479	3.3	N/A
Green	Ian Troughton	190	4.2	N/A
UKIP	John Midgley	148	3.3	N/A
Majority				
Turnout			40.4	
Conservative win (new seat)				

St Albans Central
Party	Candidate	Votes	%	±%
Liberal Democrats	Christopher White	2,644	55.0	+18.1
Conservative	Alec Campbell	1,040	21.6	+0.1
Labour	Glenys Vaughan	567	11.8	−6.8
Green	Keith Cotton	526	10.9	−11.7
TUSC	Keith Hussey	22	0.5	N/A
Majority				
Turnout			41.0	
Liberal Democrats hold		Swing		

St Albans East
Party	Candidate	Votes	%	±%
Liberal Democrats	Anthony Rowlands	2,339	55.0	+22.5
Conservative	John Whale	849	20.0	+3.3
Labour	John Paton	753	17.7	−9.5
Green	Tom Langton	169	4.0	−2.3
UKIP	Mick Hawkes	125	2.9	−13.9
Majority				
Turnout		4,235	40.1	
Liberal Democrats hold		Swing		

St Albans North
Party	Candidate	Votes	%	±%
Liberal Democrats	Charlotte Hogg	1,675	35.3	+10.6
Labour	Roma Mills	1,604	33.8	−0.8
Conservative	Brian Ellis	1,239	26.1	+2.2
Green	Gillian Mills	147	3.1	−2.1
UKIP	Matthew Dovey	76	1.6	−9.8
Majority		71	1.5	
Turnout		4,741	46.6	
Liberal Democrats gain from Labour		Swing		

St Albans South
Party	Candidate	Votes	%	±%
Liberal Democrats	Sandy Walkington	2,899	54.9	+19.2
Conservative	Richard Curthoys	1,299	24.6	+1.8
Labour	Jagat Chatrath	764	14.5	−7.6
Green	Jack Easton	191	3.6	−2.3
UKIP	Peter Whitehead	121	2.3	−10.9
Majority		1,600	30.3	
Turnout		5,274	48.1	
Liberal Democrats hold		Swing		

London Colney
Party	Candidate	Votes	%	±%
Labour	Dreda Gordon	1,326	42.5	N/A
Conservative	Mike Wakely	1,028	33.0	N/A
Liberal Democrats	Tony Lillico	476	15.3	N/A
UKIP	Alan Malin	172	5.5	N/A
Green	Matt Maddock	112	3.6	N/A
Majority				
Turnout		3,114	34.0	
Labour win (new seat)				

Colney Heath & Marshalswick
Party	Candidate	Votes	%	±%
Liberal Democrats	John Hale	2,075	45.9	N/A
Conservative	Claudio Duran	1,774	39.3	N/A
Labour	Jahida Begum	389	8.6	N/A
Green	James Lomas	153	3.4	N/A
UKIP	Tina Lomax	122	2.7	N/A
Majority				
Turnout		4,513	42.8	
Liberal Democrats win (new seat)				

St Stephens
Party	Candidate	Votes	%	±%
Conservative	Sue Featherstone	2,200	48.5	+19.0
Liberal Democrats	David Yates	1,748	38.5	+1.8
Labour	Martin McGrath	344	7.6	+0.1
UKIP	David Dickson	152	3.3	−20.1
Green	Lesley Baker	90	2.0	−0.8
Majority				
Turnout		4,534	40.7	
Conservative gain from Liberal Democrats		Swing		

=== Stevenage (6 seats) ===
Bedwell
Party	Candidate	Votes	%	±%
Labour Co-op	Sharon Taylor	1,735	51.1	+2.1
Conservative	Michelle Frith	1,277	37.6	+19.6
Liberal Democrats	Andy McGuiness	179	5.3	+1.4
Green	Victoria Snelling	145	4.3	+0.9
TUSC	Mark Gentleman	53	1.6	±0.0
Majority		458	13.5	
Turnout		3,389	31.6	
Labour Co-op hold		Swing		

Broadwater
Party	Candidate	Votes	%	±%
Conservative	Adam Mitchell	1,834	49.0	+13.5
Labour	Michelle Gardner	1,445	38.6	−10.6
Liberal Democrats	Thomas Wren	270	7.2	+0.8
Green	Richard Warr	132	3.5	−5.3
TUSC	Helen Kerr	61	1.6	−2.3
Majority		389	10.4	
Turnout		3742	34.5	
Conservative gain from Labour		Swing		

Chells
Party	Candidate	Votes	%	±%
Liberal Democrats	Robin Parker	1,955	49.7	+11.7
Conservative	Matthew Hurst	939	24.3	+10.9
Labour	Simon Speller	755	19.6	−5.2
UKIP	Marion Mason	207	5.4	−15.9
TUSC	Roger Charles	34	0.9	+0.5
Majority		1,016	25.4	
Turnout		3,890	35.1	
Liberal Democrats hold		Swing		

Old Stevenage
Party	Candidate	Votes	%	±%
Labour	Joshua Bennett Lovell	1,552	41.6	+4.2
Conservative	Graham Lawrence	1,537	41.2	+9.5
UKIP	Marilyn Yarnold-Forrester	253	6.8	−15.0
Liberal Democrats	Clive Hearmon	232	6.2	+2.4
Green	Elizabeth Sturgess	155	4.2	+0.4
Majority		15	0.4	
Turnout		3,729	35.9	
Labour hold		Swing		

Shephall
Party	Candidate	Votes	%	±%
Conservative	Michael Hearn	1,423	44.2	+15.5
Labour	Jim Brown	1,298	40.3	−12.7
Liberal Democrats	Stephen Booth	299	9.3	+3.0
Green	Martin Malocco	128	4.0	−2.4
TUSC	Trevor Palmer	66	2.1	−3.0
Majority		125	3.9	
Turnout		3,214	30.7	
Conservative gain from Labour		Swing		

St. Nicholas
Party	Candidate	Votes	%	±%
Conservative	Phil Bibby	1,601	44.7	+20.0
Labour	Richard Henry	1,395	39.0	−1.7
Liberal Democrats	Graham Snell	232	6.5	−0.8
UKIP	Amo Amato	189	5.3	−19.6
Green	Vicky Lovelace	123	3.4	+0.1
TUSC	Amber Gentleman	37	1.0	−0.5
Majority		206	5.7	
Turnout		3,577	35.2	
Conservative gain from Labour		Swing		

=== Three Rivers (6 seats) ===
Abbots Langley
Party	Candidate	Votes	%	±%
Liberal Democrats	Sara Bedford	2,136	56.4	+4.8
Conservative	Andrew O'Brien	950	25.1	+8.7
Labour	Joanne Cox	456	12.0	−0.6
UKIP	David Bennett	150	4.0	−16.3
Green	Ian Sturrock	86	2.3	N/A
Majority		1,186	31.3	
Turnout		3,628	30.2	
Liberal Democrats win (new seat)				

Croxley
Party	Candidate	Votes	%	±%
Liberal Democrats	Steve Drury	2,251	58.0	
Conservative	Jussie Kaur	992	25.5	
Labour	Sarah Linhart	338	8.7	
UKIP	Hazel Day	177	4.6	
Green	Simon Fourmy	119	3.1	
Majority		1,259	32.5	
Turnout		3,877	36.4	
Liberal Democrats win (new seat)				

Rickmansworth East & Oxhey Park
Party	Candidate	Votes	%	±%
Conservative	Frances Button	2,419	61.3	
Liberal Democrats	Jo Lucey	844	21.5	
Labour	Graham Dale	377	9.6	
UKIP	Michael Matthewson	157	4.0	
Green	Deesha Chandra	134	3.4	
Majority		1,535	39.8	
Turnout		3,931	34.9	
Conservative win (new seat)				

Rickmansworth West
Party	Candidate	Votes	%	±%
Conservative	Ralph Sangster	1,689	45.3	
Liberal Democrats	Sarah Nelmes	1,623	43.5	
Labour	James Entwistle	210	5.6	
UKIP	Mark Massyn	126	3.4	
Green	Tab McLaughlin	82	2.2	
Majority		66	1.8	
Turnout		3,730	34.3	
Conservative win (new seat)				

South Oxhey & Eastbury
Party	Candidate	Votes	%	±%
Labour	Joan King	1,563	45.1	
Conservative	Elizabeth Willetts	1,362	39.3	
UKIP	Yessica Gould	243	7.0	
Liberal Democrats	Pam Hames	228	6.6	
Green	Clare Dodd	66	1.9	
Majority		201	5.8	
Turnout		3,462	29.6	
Labour win (new seat)				

Three Rivers Rural
Party	Candidate	Votes	%	±%
Conservative	Chris Hayward	2,244	47.0	
Liberal Democrats	Phil Williams	2,091	43.8	
Labour	Bruce Prochnik	202	4.2	
Green	Dennis Goffin	144	3.0	
UKIP	Andrew Wells	91	1.9	
Majority		153	3.2	
Turnout		4,772	40.3	
Conservative win (new seat)				

=== Watford (6 seats) ===
Central Watford & Oxhey
Party	Candidate	Votes	%	±%
Liberal Democrats	Stephen Giles-Medhurst	1,866	51.5	+3.9
Labour	Sarah Flynn	782	21.6	−0.3
Conservative	David Ealey	710	19.6	+8.9
Green	James Grant	130	3.6	−1.4
UKIP	Gavin Smith	109	3.0	−10.6
TUSC	Richard Shattock	20	0.6	−1.1
Majority				
Turnout				
Liberal Democrats hold		Swing		

Meriden Tudor
Party	Candidate	Votes	%	±%
Liberal Democrats	Kareen Hastrick	1,575	49.3	+11.1
Conservative	Linda Topping	940	29.4	+14.9
Labour	Diana Ivory	557	17.4	−2.0
Green	Maureen Challis	111	3.5	+0.2
Majority		635	19.9	
Turnout		3,183	30	
Liberal Democrats hold		Swing		

Nascot Park
Party	Candidate	Votes	%	±%
Liberal Democrats	Mark Watkin	2,564	52.5	+11.2
Conservative	David Fallon	1,619	33.1	+3.2
Labour	Edward Tunnah	452	9.3	+2.9
Green	Stephanie Grant	148	3.0	−0.1
UKIP	Ian Green	91	1.9	−7.7
Majority		945	19.4	
Turnout		4,874	40.1	
Liberal Democrats hold		Swing		

North Watford
Party	Candidate	Votes	%	±%
Labour	Asif Khan	1,690	41.1	N/A
Liberal Democrats	Ian Stotesbury	1,545	37.6	N/A
Conservative	Camilla Khawaja	573	13.9	N/A
Green	Holly Fleming	285	6.9	N/A
Majority		145	3.5	
Turnout		4,093	35.3	
Labour win (new seat)				

West Watford
Party	Candidate	Votes	%	±%
Labour	Nigel Bell	2,063	62.3	N/A
Liberal Democrats	Paul Arnett	747	22.6	N/A
Conservative	Laveen Ladharam	414	12.5	N/A
TUSC	Derek Foster	69	2.1	N/A
Majority				
Turnout				
Labour win (new seat)				

Woodside Stanborough
Party	Candidate	Votes	%	±%
Liberal Democrats	Tim Williams	1,662	51.4	+4.5
Conservative	Dennis Wharton	789	24.4	+7.5
Labour	Andy O'Brien	487	15.1	+1.2
UKIP	David Penn	166	5.1	−13.5
Green	Alison Wiesner	92	2.8	−0.4
TUSC	John McShane	33	1.0	N/A
Majority		873	27	
Turnout		3,229	29.7	
Liberal Democrats hold		Swing		

=== Welwyn Hatfield (8 seats) ===
Haldens
Party	Candidate	Votes	%	±%
Liberal Democrats	Barbara Gibson	1,595	37.4	
Conservative	Sara Johnston	1,497	35.1	
Labour	Alan Chesterman	1,000	23.4	
UKIP	Sanjay Gadhvi	175	4.1	
Majority		98	2.3	
Turnout		4,267	39.9	
Liberal Democrats win (new seat)				

Handside & Peartree
Party	Candidate	Votes	%	±%
Liberal Democrats	Nigel Quinton	1,996	47.7	
Conservative	Drew Richardson	1,178	28.1	
Labour	Pauline Weston	727	17.4	
UKIP	Tom Holdsworth	182	4.3	
Green	Ian Nendick	104	2.5	
Majority		818	19.6	
Turnout		4,187	38.4	
Liberal Democrats win (new seat)				

Hatfield East
Party	Candidate	Votes	%	±%
Conservative	Susie Gordon	1,078	39.7	
Labour	Maureen Cook	980	36.1	
Liberal Democrats	Jean-Paul Skoczylas	244	9.0	
UKIP	Charles Mason	148	5.5	
Green	Christianne Sayers	134	4.9	
Independent	Melvyn Jones	129	4.8	
Majority		98	3.6	
Turnout		2,713	31.9	
Conservative win (new seat)				

Hatfield North
Party	Candidate	Votes	%	±%
Labour	Margaret Eames-Petersen	991	41.3	
Conservative	Peter Mason	838	35.0	
Liberal Democrats	Jane Quinton	261	10.9	
UKIP	Philip Keen	231	9.6	
Green	Lesley Smith	76	3.2	
Majority		153	6.3	
Turnout		2,397	27.3	
Labour win (new seat)				

Hatfield Rural
Party	Candidate	Votes	%	±%
Conservative	Stephen Boulton	2,375	68.5	
Liberal Democrats	Helen Quenet	591	17.1	
Labour	Tara-Mary Lyons	286	8.3	
UKIP	Oliver Sayers	214	6.2	
Majority		1,784	51.4	
Turnout		3,466	35.4%	
Conservative win (new seat)				

Hatfield South
Party	Candidate	Votes	%	±%
Liberal Democrats	Paul Zukowskyj	1,369	50.6	
Conservative	Keith Pieri	797	29.4	
Labour	James Broach	483	17.8	
Green	Simon Grover	59	2.2	
Majority		572	21.2	
Turnout		2,708	32.4	
Liberal Democrats win (new seat)				

Welwyn
Party	Candidate	Votes	%	±%
Conservative	Richard Smith	2,608	60.9	
Labour	James Bartholomeusz	669	15.6	
Liberal Democrats	Stephen Bustin	574	13.4	
UKIP	Arthur Stevens	226	5.3	
Green	William Berrington	204	4.8	
Majority		1,939	45.3	
Turnout		4,281	38.7	
Conservative win (new seat)				

Welwyn Garden City South
Party	Candidate	Votes	%	±%
Labour	Lynn Chesterman	1,403	41.2	
Conservative	Nick Pace	1,332	39.2	
Liberal Democrats	Christopher Corbey-West	299	8.8	
UKIP	Dean Milliken	246	7.2	
Green	Berenice Dowlen	122	3.6	
Majority		71	2.1	
Turnout		3,405	31.3	
Labour win (new seat)				
