= 2013 Hertfordshire County Council election =

2013 UK local government election

← 2009	2 May 2013	2017 →

All 77 seats to Hertfordshire County Council 39 seats needed for a majority
	First party	Second party	Third party
Party	Conservative	Liberal Democrats	Labour
Seats before	55	17	3
Seats won	46	16	15
Seat change	▼9	▼1	▲12
Popular vote	92,607	41,743	52,257
Percentage	37.9%	17.1%	21.4%
Swing	▼8.2 pp	▼10.1 pp	▲7.4 pp
- Map showing the results of the 2013 Hertfordshire County Council elections.

- Council composition after the election
Council control before election
Conservative
Council control after election
Conservative

An election to Hertfordshire County Council took place on 2 May 2013, as part of the 2013 United Kingdom local elections. 77 electoral divisions elected one county councilor each by first-past-the-post voting for a four-year term of office. The electoral divisions were the same as those used at the previous election in 2009.

All locally registered electors (British, Irish, Commonwealth and European Union citizens) who were aged 18 or over on Thursday 2 May 2013, were entitled to vote in the local elections. Those who were temporarily away from their ordinary address (for example, away working, on holiday, in student accommodation or in hospital) were also entitled to vote in the local elections, although those who had moved abroad and registered as overseas electors cannot vote in the local elections. It is possible to register to vote at more than one address (such as a university student who had a term-time address and lives at home during holidays) at the discretion of the local Electoral Register Office, but it remains an offence to vote more than once in the same local government election.

== Summary ==
The Conservative Party retained overall control of the council with a reduced majority of 15 seats, having lost a net total of 9 seats. The Liberal Democrats remained the council's official opposition with 16 seats, while the Labour Party won a larger proportion of votes to win 15 seats, a net gain of 12. UKIP were unsuccessful in their challenge for seats, despite making breakthroughs in surrounding counties. The Green Party and British National Party both lost their solitary councilors, finishing second and fourth in those two divisions respectively.

All seats in the east of the county returned Conservative councilors, whereas in Stevenage and Watford no Conservative candidates succeeded in winning a seat. Labour's main area of success was Stevenage where its candidates (some ex-councilors) regained a dominant position at the expense of the Conservatives, but their lack of success in Hemel Hempstead will have been a disappointment in a former stronghold. Labour picked up two gains in mid-density divisions in Watford and Letchworth. Liberal Democrat support held up well in Tring, but saw a greater collapse in those broad areas without any local incumbency such as East Hertfordshire (10 divisions). However, their net loss of one councilor was smaller than in most other parts of England.

== Candidates ==
Labour and Conservative parties contested every electoral division and finished bottom of individual polls in a small minority of divisions, 11 and one respectively. UKIP had no candidate in six divisions and the Liberal Democrats fielded no candidate in three. After the four main parties, the Green Party fielded the next highest number of candidates at 37, just over half of the Council divisions.

== Election results ==
Hertfordshire County Council Election Results 2013
Party	Seats	Gains	Losses	Net gain/loss	Seats %	Votes %	Votes	+/−
Conservative	46	0	9	▼9	59.7	37.9	92,607	-8.2
Liberal Democrats	16	1	2	▼1	20.8	17.1	41,743	-10.1
Labour	15	12	0	▲12	19.5	21.4	52,257	+7.4
UKIP	0	0	0	Steady	0.0	18.1	44,184	+17.2
Green	0	0	1	▼1	0.0	4.2	10,209	-2.9
Independent	0	0	0	Steady	0.0	0.9	2,289	+0.2
English Democrat	0	0	0	Steady	0.0	0.1	299	-0.1
BNP	0	0	1	▼1	0.0	0.1	123	-3.2

== Results by district ==
The above results can be broken down by district, although these are not current compositions of the district councils whose elections are held in other years.

Within Broxbourne District
Party	Seats	Gains	Losses	Net gain/loss	Seats %	Votes %	Votes	+/−
Conservative	6	0	0	0	100.0	53.8	12,531	-2.8%
BNP	0	0	0	0	0	17.1	3,986	+13.5%
Labour	0	0	0	0	0	14.8	3,454	-10.6%
Liberal Democrats	0	0	0	0	0	14.2	3,305	+1.3%

Within Dacorum District
Party	Seats	Gains	Losses	Net gain/loss	Seats %	Votes %	Votes	+/−
Conservative	8	0	0	0	80.0	39.8	12459	-8.1
Liberal Democrats	2	0	0	0	20.0	15.2	4762	-9.8
Labour	0	0	0	0	0	17.3	5427	5.0
Green	0	0	0	0	0	4.6	1429	-4.5
BNP	0	0	0	0	0			
Independent	0	0	0	0	0			

Within East Herts District
Party	Seats	Gains	Losses	Net gain/loss	Seats %	Votes %	Votes	+/−
Conservative	10	0	0	0	100	45.7	14167	-10.4
Labour	0	0	0	0	0	16.0	4961	6.1
Liberal Democrats	0	0	0	0	0.0	9.5	2934	-18.5
Independent	0	0	0	0	0.0			
BNP	0	0	0	0	0.0			
Green	0	0	0	0	0.0	0.6	171	-0.4

Within Hertsmere District
Party	Seats	Gains	Losses	Net gain/loss	Seats %	Votes %	Votes	+/−
Conservative	6	0	1	-1				
Labour	1	1	0	+1	0.0			
Liberal Democrats	0	0	0	0	0.0			
Green	0	0	0	0	0.0			
BNP	0	0	0	0	0.0			
Independent	0	0	0	0	0.0			

Within North Herts District
Party	Seats	Gains	Losses	Net gain/loss	Seats %	Votes %	Votes	+/−
Conservative	7	0	2	-2				
Labour	2	2	0	+2				
Liberal Democrats	0	0	0	0	0.0			
Green	0	0	0	0	0.0			
BNP	0	0	0	0	0.0			
English Democrat	0	0	0	0	0.0	0		

Within St Albans District
Party	Seats	Gains	Losses	Net gain/loss	Seats %	Votes %	Votes	+/−
Liberal Democrats	5	0	2	-2				
Conservative	3	0	0	0				
Labour	2	2	0	+2	0.0			
Green	0	0	0	0	0.0			
BNP	0	0	0	0	0.0	0		

Within Stevenage District
Party	Seats	Gains	Losses	Net gain/loss	Seats %	Votes %	Votes	+/−
Labour	5	3	0	+3				
Liberal Democrats	1	0	0	0				
Conservative	0	0	3	-3				
UKIP	0	0	0	0	0.0			
BNP	0	0	0	0	0.0			
Green	0	0	0	0	0.0			
English Democrat	0	0	0	0	0.0			

Within Three Rivers District
Party	Seats	Gains	Losses	Net gain/loss	Seats %	Votes %	Votes	+/−
Conservative	3	0	0	0	50.0	34.9	7,061	–9.2
Liberal Democrats	2	0	0	0	33.3	30.0	6,075	–12.1
Labour	1	1	0	+1	16.7	12.9	2,617	+4.5
UKIP	0	0	0	0	0.0	21.8	4,407	New
BNP	0	0	1	-1	0.0	0.4	71	–5.0

Within Watford District
Party	Seats	Gains	Losses	Net gain/loss	Seats %	Votes %	Votes	+/−
Liberal Democrats	4	0	0	0	66.7	35.5	6,967	–5.0
Labour	2	1	0	+1	33.3	24.9	4,880	+5.1
Conservative	0	0	0	0	0.0	18.0	3,535	–7.7
UKIP	0	0	0	0	0.0	11.6	2,282	New
Green	0	0	1	–1	0.0	7.4	1,461	–5.4
Independent	0	0	0	0	0.0	2.3	445	New
TUSC	0	0	0	0	0.0	0.2	49	New

Within Welwyn Hatfield District
Party	Seats	Gains	Losses	Net gain/loss	Seats %	Votes %	Votes	+/−
Conservative	3	0	3	-3				
Liberal Democrats	2	1	0	+1				
Labour	2	2	0	+2				
Green	0	0	0	0	0.0			
BNP	0	0	0	0	0.0			
Independent	0	0	0	0	0.0	0		

== Results by electoral division ==
=== Broxbourne (6 seats) ===
Cheshunt Central
Party	Candidate	Votes	%	±%
Conservative	Dave Hewitt	1,283	49.9	−4.2
UKIP	Colleen Blyth	662	25.8	+6.4**
Labour	Michael Alan Watson	441	17.2	+3.8
Liberal Democrats	Nick Sutton	177	6.9	−5.4
Majority		621		
Turnout				
Conservative hold		Swing		

Flamstead End and Turnford
Party	Candidate	Votes	%	±%
Conservative	Paul Vincent	1,335	49.0	−4.6
UKIP	Tony Faulkner	859	31.6	+10.3**
Labour	Alex Harvey	446	16.4	+4.5
Liberal Democrats	Rory James Anthony Gleeson	75	2.8	−9.8
Majority		476		
Turnout			19.7	
Conservative hold		Swing		

Goffs Oak and Bury Green
Party	Candidate	Votes	%	±%
Conservative	Robert Gordon	1,462	57.2	−2.4
UKIP	Jack Salmon	648	25.4	+11.7**
Labour	Alexander David McInnes	391	15.3	+3.6
BNP	Ian John Seeby	52	2.0	+11.7**
Majority		814		
Turnout			22.7	
Conservative hold		Swing		

Hoddesdon North
Party	Candidate	Votes	%	±%
Conservative	Tim Hutchings	1,141	41.5	−12.3
Labour	Edward Herbert Hopwood	435	15.8	−0.1
UKIP	David Steven Platt	1054	38.3	+22.9
Liberal Democrats	Nigel Francis Chevalley De Rivaz	111	4.0	−9.9
Majority		87		
Turnout			25.2	
Conservative hold		Swing		

Hoddesdon South
Party	Candidate	Votes	%	±%
Conservative	Alan Searing	1,553	48.4	−7.9
Liberal Democrats	Kirstie Jane Mounsteven De Rivaz	201	6.3	−13.0
UKIP	Evelyn Faulkner	988	30.8	+17.7
Labour	Malcolm David Aitken	450	14.0	+3.7
Majority		565		
Turnout			24.5	
Conservative hold		Swing		

Waltham Cross
Party	Candidate	Votes	%	±%
Conservative	Dee Hart	1,215	46.9	+5.3
Labour	Neil Harvey	782	30.2	+3.3
UKIP	Salvatore Scozzaro	584	22.6	+5.3
Majority		433		
Turnout			23.7	
Conservative hold		Swing		

=== Dacorum (10 seats) ===
Berkhamsted
Party	Candidate	Votes	%	±%
Conservative	Ian Reay	1,805	45.1	+1.9
UKIP	Norman Cutting	696	17.4	+7.4
Liberal Democrats	Hugo Hardy	610	15.2	−18.2
Green	Paul Gregory De Hoest	448	11.2	+3.0
Labour	Peter Scott	433	10.8	+6.0
Majority		1109		
Turnout				
Conservative hold		Swing		

Bridgewater
Party	Candidate	Votes	%	±%
Conservative	David Lloyd	1,487	54.9	−6.0
UKIP	Mark Anderson	600	22.1	+14.7**
Labour	Julia Coleman	301	11.1	+2.8
Liberal Democrats	Robert James Irving	211	7.8	−7.2
Green	Sherief Hassan	104	3.8	−4.3
Majority		887		
Turnout			31.4	
Conservative hold		Swing		

Hemel Hempstead East
Party	Candidate	Votes	%	±%
Conservative	Andrew Williams	1,222	44.1	−12.7
UKIP	Noel Swinford	802	28.9	N/A
Labour	Mandy Tattershall	576	20.8	+5.4
Liberal Democrats	Angela Tindall	162	5.8	−11.0
Majority		420		
Turnout			27.6	
Conservative hold		Swing		

Hemel Hempstead North East
Party	Candidate	Votes	%	±%
Conservative	Colette Wyatt-Lowe	1,026	43.2	−10.4
UKIP	John Clark Bruce	604	25.4	+15.5**
Labour	Anne Isobel Fisher	581	24.5	+6.3
Green	Paul Sandford	90	3.8	−2.3
Liberal Democrats	Denise Rance	70	2.9	−8.9
Majority		422		
Turnout			24.0	
Conservative hold		Swing		

Hemel Hempstead North West
Party	Candidate	Votes	%	±%
Conservative	Terence Douris	1,278	38.8	−4.0
Labour	Mike Bromberg	867	26.3	+4.5
UKIP	Mike Potts	852	25.9	+15.8**
Green	Jane Cousins	158	4.8	−5.1
Liberal Democrats	David Bird	129	3.9	−11.0
Majority		411		
Turnout			28.3	
Conservative hold		Swing		

Hemel Hempstead St Pauls
Party	Candidate	Votes	%	±%
Liberal Democrats	Ron Tindall	816	33.2	−1.6
Conservative	Dan Wood	579	23.5	−10.1
Labour	Anglea Terry	510	20.7	+3.4
UKIP	Martyn Adams	499	20.3	+12.1**
Green	Paul Harris	54	2.2	−3.4
Majority		237		
Turnout			26.2	
Liberal Democrats hold		Swing		

Hemel Hempstead South East
Party	Candidate	Votes	%	±%
Conservative	Anthony McKay	993	35.1	−12.7
UKIP	Gillian Elaine Adams	803	28.4	N/A
Labour	Bernard Gronert	784	27.7	+5.7
Liberal Democrats	Janet Ventiroso	123	4.3	−12.4
Green	Suzanne Caron Watts	117	4.1	−8.7
Majority		190		
Turnout			24.9	
Conservative hold		Swing		

Hemel Hempstead Town
Party	Candidate	Votes	%	±%
Conservative	William James Wyatt-Lowe	1,441	42.4	−8.1
Labour	Stefan Fisher	702	20.6	+6.0
UKIP	Howard Keith Koch	648	19.0	N/A
Liberal Democrats	Chris Angell	291	8.6	−12.4
Green	Ben Collier	281	8.3	−4.9
TUSC	Firasul Fouz	27	0.8	N/A
Majority		739		
Turnout			26.6	
Conservative hold		Swing		

Kings Langley
Party	Candidate	Votes	%	±%
Conservative	Richard Roberts	1,558	51.8	−6.6
UKIP	Chris Wright	785	26.1	+19.9**
Labour	Jean Langdon	325	10.8	+2.6
Green	Wiebke Carr	177	5.9	−4.1
Liberal Democrats	Garrick Stevens	157	5.2	−11.6
Majority		773		
Turnout			28.5	
Conservative hold		Swing		

Tring
Party	Candidate	Votes	%	±%
Liberal Democrats	Nicholas Hollinghurst	2,193	49.3	−3.1
Conservative	Fiona Guest	1070	24.1	−13.3
UKIP	Michael Frederick Siveyer	816	18.3	N/A
Labour	Colin Barry Phillips	348	7.8	+4.9
Majority		1123		
Turnout			36.1	
Liberal Democrats hold		Swing		

=== East Herts (10 seats) ===
All Saints
Party	Candidate	Votes	%	±%
Conservative	Andrew Stevenson	914	30.9	−21.6
Independent	Sally Newton	818	27.7	
Labour Co-op	Myra Rae Campbell	650	22.0	+6.6
UKIP	Sheila Margaret Pettman	456	15.4	
Liberal Democrats	Andrew Porrer	114	3.9	−27.1
Majority		96		
Turnout			29.7	
Conservative hold		Swing		

Bishop's Stortford East
Party	Candidate	Votes	%	±%
Conservative	John Barfoot	1,312	38.1	−8.7
UKIP	Nicholas Dickinson	817	23.7	
Liberal Democrats	Mione Goldspink	790	23.0	−21.0
Labour	Val Cooke	513	14.9	+6.7
Majority		495		
Turnout			32.6	
Conservative hold		Swing		

Bishop's Stortford Rural
Party	Candidate	Votes	%	±%
Conservative	Graham McAndrew	1,452	43.7	−15.2
UKIP	William Matthew Compton	1166	35.1	
Labour	Darren Keith Neesam	429	12.9	+4.3
Liberal Democrats	Laurie Calvin	270	8.1	−23.0
Majority		286		
Turnout			31.6	
Conservative hold		Swing		

Bishop's Stortford West
Party	Candidate	Votes	%	±%
Conservative	Colin Bernard Woodward	1,313	42.1	−3.0
UKIP	Adrian Howard Baker	949	30.4	+22.4**
Labour	Alex Young	516	16.5	+6.3
Liberal Democrats	Bob Taylor	329	10.5	−15.5
Majority		364		
Turnout			27.1	
Conservative hold		Swing		

Braughing
Party	Candidate	Votes	%	±%
Conservative	Rose Cheswright	1,381	44.4	−18.3
UKIP	Kara Platt	679	21.8	
Labour	Steven Charles Stone	402	12.9	+3.0
Independent	Debbie Lemay	343	11.0	
Green	Woollcombe, David Rupert	171	5.5	
Liberal Democrats	Michael Wood	117	3.8	−22.0
Majority		702		
Turnout			30.6	
Conservative hold		Swing		

Hertford Rural
Party	Candidate	Votes	%	±%
Conservative	Ken Crofton	2,176	61.3	−5.2
Independent	Gary Francis O'Leary	683	19.3	
Labour Co-op	Jim Brown	440	12.4	+3.9
Liberal Democrats	Catherine Gerran Edwards	224	6.3	−17.1
Majority		1493		
Turnout			37.5	
Conservative hold		Swing		

St Andrews
Party	Candidate	Votes	%	±%
Conservative	Peter Ruffles	1,625	54.9	−1.1
Labour	Graham Peter Nickson	741	25.0	+12.6
UKIP	Michael Habermel	434	14.7	−6.0**
Liberal Democrats	Sean Shaw	145	4.9	−5.4
Majority		884		
Turnout			28.2	
Conservative hold		Swing		

Sawbridgeworth
Party	Candidate	Votes	%	±%
Conservative	Roger Beeching	1,568	52.2	−14.5
UKIP	Jack Barnard	825	27.5	
Labour	Sotirios Adamopoulos	399	13.3	+4.1
Liberal Democrats	Julia Mary Davies	194	6.5	−16.1
Majority		743		
Turnout			27.6	
Conservative hold		Swing		

Ware North
Party	Candidate	Votes	%	±%
Conservative	David Andrews	1,186	41.8	−6.2
UKIP	Matthew Kent	689	24.3	+16.0**
Liberal Democrats	John Francis William Wing	472	16.7	−15.4
Labour Co-op	David John Bell	419	14.8	+5.9
TUSC	Mark Andrew Wright	59	2.1	+16.0**
Majority		497		
Turnout			27.4	
Conservative hold		Swing		

Ware South
Party	Candidate	Votes	%	±%
Conservative	Jeanette Joyce Taylor	1,240	46.4	−10.0
UKIP	Andrew Nicolas	687	25.7	
Labour	Billy Morgan	452	16.9	+8.6
Liberal Democrats	Tony Gubb	279	10.4	−23.2
Majority		553		
Turnout			25.3	
Conservative hold		Swing		

=== Hertsmere (7 seats) ===
Borehamwood North
Party	Candidate	Votes	%	±%
Labour	Leon Reefe	1,183	44.1	+15.5
Conservative	Clive Stephen Butchins	735	27.4	−11.3
UKIP	David John Appleby	678	25.3	+5.7**
Liberal Democrats	Derek Buchanan	79	2.9	−9.3
Majority		448		
Turnout			22.1	
Labour gain from Conservative		Swing		

Borehamwood South
Party	Candidate	Votes	%	±%
Conservative	Alan Plancey	1,050	39.4	−12.6
Labour	Ann Harrison	889	33.3	+6.4
UKIP	Albert Nicolas	631	23.7	
Liberal Democrats	Lloyd Harris	86	3.2	−15.9
Majority		161		
Turnout			23.2	
Conservative hold		Swing		

Bushey North
Party	Candidate	Votes	%	±%
Conservative	Steve O'Brien	995	43.4	−2.4
UKIP	Laura Katherine Daley	524	22.9	
Labour	Jim Sowerbutts	437	19.1	+12.0
Liberal Democrats	Shailain Shah	321	14.0	−24.1
Majority		471		
Turnout			23.3	
Conservative hold		Swing		

Bushey South
Party	Candidate	Votes	%	±%
Conservative	Seamus Quilty	1,602	61.2	−3.9
UKIP	Sushil Kantibhai Patel	400	15.3	
Labour	David Bearfield	376	14.4	+6.6
Liberal Democrats	Robert Graham Gamble	229	8.7	−10.1
Majority		1202		
Turnout			25.7	
Conservative hold		Swing		

Potters Bar East
Party	Candidate	Votes	%	±%
Conservative	Peter Frederick John Knell	1,471	48.4	−16.6
UKIP	Simon Edward Rhodes	775	25.5	
Labour	John Doolan	463	15.2	+4.1
Liberal Democrats	Peter Bonner	192	6.3	−16.1
Green	B Samuel	127	4.2	
Majority		696		
Turnout			25.8	
Conservative hold		Swing		

Potters Bar West & Shenley
Party	Candidate	Votes	%	±%
Conservative	Morris Bright	1,134	50.8	−12.6
UKIP	David Rutter	549	24.6	
Labour	Ray Edge	379	17.0	+4.5
Liberal Democrats	Susan Oatway	160	7.2	−14.9
Majority		585		
Turnout			24.6	
Conservative hold		Swing		

Watling
Party	Candidate	Votes	%	±%
Conservative	Caroline Clapper	1,874	63.7	−7.5
UKIP	Will Ferry	486	16.5	
Labour	Richard Raymond Butler	392	13.3	+5.8
Liberal Democrats	Holly Gunning	176	6.0	−5.3
Majority		1388		
Turnout		25.8		
Conservative hold		Swing		

=== North Herts (9 seats) ===
Hitchin North
Party	Candidate	Votes	%	±%
Labour Co-op	David Billing	1,503	45.5	+13.4
Conservative	Alan Millard	1070	32.4	+0.2
Green	Gavin Nicholson	479	14.5	−2.8
Liberal Democrats	Andrew Ircha	217	6.6	−7.5
Majority		433		
Turnout		3,300	28.35	
Labour Co-op gain from Conservative		Swing		

Hitchin Rural
Party	Candidate	Votes	%	±%
Conservative	David Barnard	1,395	54.7	−0.7
Labour	Sadie Billing	699	27.4	+12.2
Green	Sylvia Hutchinson	264	10.3	−4.0
Liberal Democrats	Michael Lott	176	6.9	−7.5
Majority		696		
Turnout			28.81	
Conservative hold		Swing		

Hitchin South
Party	Candidate	Votes	%	±%
Conservative	Derrick Ashley	1,577	42.1	−7.2
UKIP	Adrianne Smyth	731	19.5	
Liberal Democrats	Paul Clark	671	17.9	−12.3
Labour Co-op	Nafisa Sayany	510	13.6	+6.0
Green	Kate Hendry	250	6.7	−5.5
Majority		846		
Turnout			36.52	
Conservative hold		Swing		

Knebworth & Codicote
Party	Candidate	Votes	%	±%
Conservative	Richard Thake	1,775	52.4	−9.6
UKIP	Nick Brooke	726	21.4	
Labour	John Kolm-Murray	471	13.9	+4.4
Liberal Democrats	Rob Lambie	227	6.7	−7.0
Green	Rebecca Leek	180	5.3	−8.9
Majority		1049		
Turnout			30.9	
Conservative hold		Swing		

Letchworth East & Baldock
Party	Candidate	Votes	%	±%
Conservative	Michael Muir	1,593	51.6	+3.0
Labour Co-op	Rachel Danae Burgin	909	29.4	+12.4
Green	Arwen Tapping	366	11.8	−2.6
Liberal Democrats	Richard William Winter	204	6.6	−12.7
Majority		684		
Turnout			26.13	
Conservative hold		Swing		

Letchworth North West
Party	Candidate	Votes	%	±%
Labour Co-op	Lorna Kercher	1,038	38.9	+14.3
Conservative	Andy Frankland	990	37.1	+2.5
English Democrat	Charles Vickers	299	11.2	−4.1
Green	Rosemary Bland	201	7.5	−3.1
Liberal Democrats	Martin Penny	124	4.6	−9.6
Majority		48		
Turnout			28.5	
Labour Co-op gain from Conservative		Swing		

Letchworth South
Party	Candidate	Votes	%	±%
Conservative	Terry Hone	1,502	44.8	−6.6
Labour Co-op	David Peter Kearns	663	19.8	+6.5
UKIP	John Barry	636	19.0	
Liberal Democrats	John Winder	283	8.5	−12.6
Green	Mario May	251	7.5	−5.7
Majority		839		
Turnout			30.9	
Conservative hold		Swing		

North Herts Rural
Party	Candidate	Votes	%	±%
Conservative	Tony Hunter	1,506	35.5	−8.8
Liberal Democrats	Ian Simpson	1437	33.9	−8.9
UKIP	Peter Robbins	796	18.8	
Labour Co-op	Ken Garland	350	8.3	+3.4
Green	Felix Power	135	3.2	−4.2
Majority		69		
Turnout			35.46	
Conservative hold		Swing		

Royston
Party	Candidate	Votes	%	±%
Conservative	Fiona Ronan Greenwood Hill	1,508	39.2	−13.0
UKIP	Mark James Hughes	1210	31.4	
Labour Co-op	Les Baker	732	19.0	+9.8
Green	Karen Julie Harmel	232	6.0	−6.2
Liberal Democrats	John Winder	157	4.1	−21.6
Majority		298		
Turnout			31.3	
Conservative hold		Swing		

=== St Albans (10 seats) ===
Harpenden North East
Party	Candidate	Votes	%	±%
Conservative	David Williams	1,672	53.8	−0.7
Liberal Democrats	Jeffrey Kyndon Phillips	547	17.6	−9.4
Labour Co-op	Rosemary Elsbeth Ross	468	15.1	+8.2
Green	Pamela Bancroft	398	12.8	+1.9
Majority		1125		
Turnout			28.7	
Conservative hold		Swing		

Harpenden South West
Party	Candidate	Votes	%	±%
Conservative	Teresa Catherine Heritage	2,569	70.4	+4.8
Liberal Democrats	Maria Louise Moyses	382	10.5	−8.1
Green	Rosalind Paul	238	6.5	−3.0
Labour	Michael Gray-Higgins	436	11.9	+6.1
Majority		2133		
Turnout			32.7	
Conservative hold		Swing		

St Albans Central
Party	Candidate	Votes	%	±%
Liberal Democrats	Chris White	1,369	36.9	−8.7
Conservative	Alec Cambell	796	21.5	−3.1
Green	Jack Edward Easton	837	22.6	+5.0
Labour Co-op	Andrew Dixon	689	18.6	+6.8
Majority		532		
Turnout			33.3	
Liberal Democrats hold		Swing		

St Albans East
Party	Candidate	Votes	%	±%
Liberal Democrats	Robert Graham Prowse	1,229	32.5	−12.6
Labour	Vivienne Windle	1,030	27.2	+15.0
UKIP	Michael Mason	636	16.8	
Conservative	Guy Martin Young	631	16.7	−11.5
Green	Greg Riener	239	6.3	−7.4
Majority		199		
Turnout			35.6	
Liberal Democrats hold		Swing		

St Albans North
Party	Candidate	Votes	%	±%
Labour	Roma Mills	1,487	34.6	+20.3
Liberal Democrats	Anthony Francis Rowlands	1,061	24.7	−13.9
Conservative	Salih Gaygusuz	1,026	23.9	−9.6
UKIP	Philip John Singleton	489	11.4	
Green	Jill Mills	223	5.2	−7.5
Majority		426		
Turnout			39.5	
Labour gain from Liberal Democrats		Swing		

St Albans Rural
Party	Candidate	Votes	%	±%
Conservative	Maxine Susan Crawley	1,802	50.7	+5.7
Liberal Democrats	Judy Shardlow	742	20.9	−20.8
UKIP	Sidney Pratt	549	15.4	
Labour	Linda Spiri	267	735	+3.8
Green	Thomas Woodburne Bruce Hardy	187	5.3	−3.7
Majority		1060		
Turnout			36.2	
Conservative hold		Swing		

St Albans South
Party	Candidate	Votes	%	±%
Liberal Democrats	Sandy Walkington	1,486	35.7	−3.4
Conservative	Brian Ellis	949	22.8	−8.3
Labour	Janet Smith	918	22.1	+6.8
UKIP	Dawn Bloor	549	13.2	
Green	Kate Metcalf	246	5.9	−7.7
Majority		537		
Turnout			39.5	
Liberal Democrats hold		Swing		

St Stephen's
Party	Candidate	Votes	%	±%
Liberal Democrats	Aislinn Lee	1,495	36.7	−7.1
Conservative	Sue Featherstone	1,201	29.5	−13.4
UKIP	Peter James Whitehead	951	23.4	
Labour	Josh Molloy	305	7.5	+1.9
Green	Lesley Charlotte Baker	112	2.8	−4.3
Majority		294		
Turnout			36.6	
Liberal Democrats hold		Swing		

Sandridge
Party	Candidate	Votes	%	±%
Liberal Democrats	Geoff Churchard	1,203	34.9	−12.7
Conservative	Beric Read	1,099	31.9	−5.5
UKIP	John Francis Stocker	640	18.6	
Labour	John Paton	337	9.8	+5.0
Green	Ian Troughton	164	4.8	−4.6
Majority		104		
Turnout			39.0	
Liberal Democrats hold		Swing		

The Colneys
Party	Candidate	Votes	%	±%
Labour	Dreda Gordon	1,235	32.1	+19.5
Liberal Democrats	Chris Brazier	1,026	26.6	−15.1
Conservative	Dave Winstone	866	22.5	−9.1
UKIP	Christopher David Thorpe	638	16.6	+10.5**
Green	Lydia El-Khouri	88	2.3	−5.3
Majority		209		
Turnout			33.9	
Labour gain from Liberal Democrats		Swing		

=== Stevenage (6 seats) ===
Bedwell
Party	Candidate	Votes	%	±%
Labour Co-op	Sharon Jane Taylor	1,436	49.0	+10.7
UKIP	Billy Hamilton	696	23.8	+3.0**
Conservative	Michelle Mary Calcutt	526	18.0	−5.3
Liberal Democrats	Gareth Morgan Rhys Steiner	114	3.9	−6.5
Green	Ian Cropton	100	3.4	−2.1
TUSC	Steve Glennon	46	1.6	3.0**
Majority		740		
Turnout			29.42	
Labour Co-op hold		Swing		

Broadwater
Party	Candidate	Votes	%	±%
Labour Co-op	Sherma Amantha Batson	1,233	44.5	+16.1
Conservative	Matthew Hurst	977	35.2	+3.3
Green	Graham Crawford White	244	8.8	+3.3
Liberal Democrats	Andy McGuinness	177	6.4	−6.2
TUSC	Helen Dorothy Kerr	108	3.9	−17.2**
Majority		256		
Turnout			29.22	
Labour Co-op gain from Conservative		Swing		

Chells
Party	Candidate	Votes	%	±%
Liberal Democrats	Robin Gareth Parker	1,368	38.0	+0.7
Labour Co-op	Ric Euteneuer	893	24.8	+4.6
UKIP	Sheila Frances Hamilton	767	21.3	+5.1**
Conservative	Margaret Penelope Notley	482	13.4	−8.5
Green	James Alexander Drew	67	1.9	−1.8
TUSC	Mark Pickersgill	15	0.4	+5.1**
Majority		475		
Turnout			35.30	
Liberal Democrats hold		Swing		

Old Stevenage
Party	Candidate	Votes	%	±%
Labour Co-op	Amanda King	1,559	37.4	+5.8
Conservative	James Robert Phillip Fraser	1,322	31.7	−4.3
UKIP	Sean Howlett	909	21.8	+7.2**
Liberal Democrats	Clive Hearmon	171	4.1	−6.1
Green	Elizabeth Genevieve Sturges	159	3.8	−2.5
TUSC	Trevor Michael Palmer	39	0.9	+7.2
Majority		237		
Turnout			32.46	
Labour Co-op gain from Conservative		Swing		

St Nicholas
Party	Candidate	Votes	%	±%
Labour Co-op	Richard Joseph Henry	1,343	40.7	+12.3
UKIP	Ken Neal	822	24.9	+1.6**
Conservative	Philip Bibby	781	23.7	−6.2
Liberal Democrats	Graham Snell	189	5.7	−5.5
Green	Julia Winter	110	3.3	−2.0
TUSC	Mark Nathan Simon Gentleman	49	1.5	+1.6**
Majority		521		
Turnout			27.52	
Labour Co-op gain from Conservative		Swing		

Shephall
Party	Candidate	Votes	%	±%
Labour Co-op	John Lloyd	1,321	53.0	+20.4
Conservative	Adam Mitchell	717	28.7	+3.8
Green	Harold Bland	159	6.4	+0.3
Liberal Democrats	Debby Betts	156	6.3	−5.8
TUSC	Amanda Gloria Dilley	126	5.1	−18.5**
Majority		604		
Turnout			25.85	
Labour Co-op hold		Swing		

=== Three Rivers (6 seats) ===
Abbots Langley
Party	Candidate	Votes	%	±%
Liberal Democrats	Sara Bedford	1,851	50.6	–8.8
UKIP	David Bernard Bennett	744	20.3	New
Conservative	Rachel Laura Andrews	601	16.4	–8.2
Labour	Colin James Gray	461	12.6	+3.6
Majority		1,107	30.3	N/A
Turnout		3,657	26.3	–10.4
Liberal Democrats hold		Swing	–14.5	

Chorleywood
Party	Candidate	Votes	%	±%
Conservative	Chris Hayward	1,867	53.9	–8.8
Liberal Democrats	Raj Khiroya	895	25.9	–7.8
UKIP	Giles Cowley	512	14.8	New
Labour	Michael James Harrison	187	5.4	+1.9
Majority		972	28.1	–1.0
Turnout		3,461	32.9	–16.2
Conservative hold		Swing	–0.5	

Croxley
Party	Candidate	Votes	%	±%
Liberal Democrats	Steve Drury	1,407	50.5	–5.2
UKIP	Frank Martin Brand	617	22.2	New
Conservative	Reena Ranger	473	17.0	–19.6
Labour	David Stephen Wynne-Jones	288	10.3	+2.6
Majority		790	28.4	N/A
Turnout		2,785	27.5	–12.3
Liberal Democrats hold		Swing	–13.7	

Oxhey Park
Party	Candidate	Votes	%	±%
Conservative	Frances Button	2,350	70.0	+21.0
Liberal Democrats	Pam Hames	701	20.9	–19.7
Labour	Ana Bakshi	308	9.2	+4.2
Majority		1,649	49.1	+40.7
Turnout		2,350	29.5	–17.3
Conservative hold		Swing	+20.3	

Rickmansworth
Party	Candidate	Votes	%	±%
Conservative	Ralph Sangster	1,370	37.6	–19.1
Liberal Democrats	Christopher Simon Lloyd	1162	31.9	–5.5
UKIP	Amy Charles	707	19.4	New
Labour	Su Gomer	409	11.2	+5.2
Majority		208	5.7	–13.7
Turnout		3,648	27.7	–9.4
Conservative hold		Swing	–6.8	

South Oxhey
Party	Candidate	Votes	%	±%
Labour	Joan King	964	49.0	+20.6
UKIP	Helena Ruth Hart	472	24.0	New
Conservative	Ty Harris	400	20.3	–4.9
BNP	Christopher E Livingstone	71	3.6	–25.9
Liberal Democrats	Dennis John Rogers	59	3.0	–13.8
Majority		492	25.0	N/A
Turnout		1,966	22.2	–7.8
Labour gain from BNP		Swing	–1.7	

=== Watford (6 seats) ===
Callowland Leggatts
Party	Candidate	Votes	%	±%
Labour	Anne Joynes	1,264	39.1	+27.5
Green	Ian Brandon	857	26.6	–9.8
Liberal Democrats	Dennis Wharton	800	24.9	–1.4
Conservative	Suqlain Mahmood	296	9.2	–16.2
Majority		407	12.7	N/A
Turnout		3,217	28.8	
Labour gain from Green		Swing	+18.6	

Central Oxhey
Party	Candidate	Votes	%	±%
Liberal Democrats	Stephen Giles-Medhurst	1,387	47.6	–3.7
Labour	Avril Joy Haley	638	21.9	+8.0
UKIP	Renie Susan Price	398	13.7	New
Conservative	Neil John Punter	312	10.7	–13.2
Green	Susan Murray	128	4.4	–6.4
TUSC	Mark O'Connor	49	1.7	New
Majority		749	25.7	N/A
Turnout		2,912	24.9	
Liberal Democrats hold		Swing	–5.9	

Meriden Tudor
Party	Candidate	Votes	%	±%
Liberal Democrats	Kareen Mary Hastrick	1,119	38.3	–4.2
UKIP	Nicholas Richard Lincoln	709	24.3	New
Labour	Diana Mary Ivory	569	19.5	+7.0
Conservative	Jane West	425	14.6	–12.4
Green	Martin Wiesner	98	3.4	–6.7
Majority		410	14.0	N/A
Turnout		2,920	27.2	
Liberal Democrats hold		Swing	–14.3	

Nascot Park
Party	Candidate	Votes	%	±%
Liberal Democrats	Mark Adrian Watkin	1,917	41.4	–4.9
Conservative	Binita Mehta	1,387	29.9	–11.4
UKIP	David Penn	446	9.6	New
Independent	Malcolm Anthony Meerabux	445	9.6	New
Labour	Steven Palmer	296	6.4	+0.6
Green	Sally Ivins	143	3.1	–3.6
Majority		530	11.4	+6.5
Turnout		4,634	37.9	
Liberal Democrats hold		Swing	+3.2	

Vicarage Hollywell
Party	Candidate	Votes	%	±%
Labour	Nigel Bell	1,737	59.2	+0.4
Liberal Democrats	Bobby Amin	475	16.2	–8.2
UKIP	Robert George Carter	346	11.8	New
Conservative	David Charles Ealey	227	7.7	–2.1
Green	Paula Mary Evelyn Brodhurst	149	5.1	–1.9
Majority		1,262	43.0	+8.6
Turnout		2,934	24.3	
Labour hold		Swing	+4.3	

Woodside Stanborough
Party	Candidate	Votes	%	±%
Liberal Democrats	Derek Thomas Francis Scudder	1,269	47.2	–7.6
UKIP	Philip Louis Cox	502	18.7	New
Conservative	Tony Rogers	458	17.0	–6.7
Labour	Omar Ismail	376	14.0	+1.4
Green	Alison Wiesner	86	3.2	–5.8
Majority		767	28.5	N/A
Turnout		2,691	24.8	
Liberal Democrats hold		Swing	–13.1	

=== Welwyn Hatfield (7 seats) ===
Haldens
Party	Candidate	Votes	%	±%
Conservative	Sara Johnstone	1,072	36.4	−13.7
Labour	Mike Larkins	966	32.8	+13.1
UKIP	Dan Paddock	596	20.3	N/A
Green	Susan Groom	142	4.8	−9.1
Liberal Democrats	Frank Marsh	122	4.1	−11.3
TUSC	David Humphreys	33	1.1	N/A
Majority		106	3.6	
Turnout		2933	28.8	
Conservative hold		Swing		

Handside & Peartree
Party	Candidate	Votes	%	±%
Liberal Democrats	Malcolm Cowan	1,380	40.0	−2.6
Conservative	Harry Bower	875	25.4	−14.0
Labour	Steve Roberts	600	17.4	+7.3
UKIP	Alex Baker	426	12.4	N/A
Green	Ian Nendick	132	3.8	−3.7
TUSC	Bryan Clare	28	0.8	N/A
Majority		505	14.6	
Turnout		3441	32.2	
Liberal Democrats hold		Swing		

Hatfield North
Party	Candidate	Votes	%	±%
Labour	Maureen Cook	1,432	36.5	+13.9
Conservative	Martin Marks	1213	31.0	−11.1
UKIP	Martin Orkin	825	21.1	N/A
Liberal Democrats	Nigel Quinton	204	5.2	−15.4
Green	Adrian Toole	161	4.1	−5.6
TUSC	Richard Shattock	71	1.8	N/A
Majority		219	5.5	
Turnout		3886	22.9	
Labour gain from Conservative		Swing		

Hatfield Rural
Party	Candidate	Votes	%	±%
Conservative	Martin Mills-Bishop	1,782	59.6	−15.9
UKIP	Kevin Daley	682	22.8	N/A
Labour	Diana Bell	227	7.6	+0.6
Green	Alan Borgars	148	5.0	−3.2
Liberal Democrats	Nigel Bain	143	4.8	−3.9
Majority		1100	36.8	
Turnout		2989	30.8	−15.7
Conservative hold		Swing		

Hatfield South
Party	Candidate	Votes	%	±%
Liberal Democrats	Paul Zukowskyj	803	28.8	+11.4
Conservative	Stuart Pile	766	27.4	−18.8
Labour	Cathy Watson	640	22.9	+2.5
UKIP	William Braithwaite	474	17.0	N/A
Green	Barry Cross	102	3.3	−3.1
Majority		37	1.4	
Turnout		2785	27.3	
Liberal Democrats gain from Conservative		Swing		

Welwyn
Party	Candidate	Votes	%	±%
Conservative	Richard Smith	2,117	52.5	−9.7
UKIP	Arthur Stevens	753	18.7	N/A
Labour	Roisin Reid	629	15.6	+4.8
Liberal Democrats	David Bartlett	275	6.8	−8.6
Green	William Berrington	257	6.4	−4.9
Majority		1364	33.8	
Turnout		4031	33.7	
Conservative hold		Swing		

Welwyn Garden City South
Party	Candidate	Votes	%	±%
Labour	Lynn Chesterman	982	37.5	+15.3
Conservative	Steve Markiewicz	808	30.8	−10.3
UKIP	Richard Colwell	585	22.3	N/A
Green	Berenice Dowlen	150	5.7	−16.4
Liberal Democrats	Ayesha Rohale	60	2.3	−11.6
TUSC	Cameron Bransom	29	1.1	N/A
Majority		174	6.7	
Turnout		2614	24.9	
Labour gain from Conservative		Swing		
