= Sharon Taylor, Baroness Taylor of Stevenage =

British politician (born 1956)

The Right Honourable The Baroness Taylor of Stevenage OBE
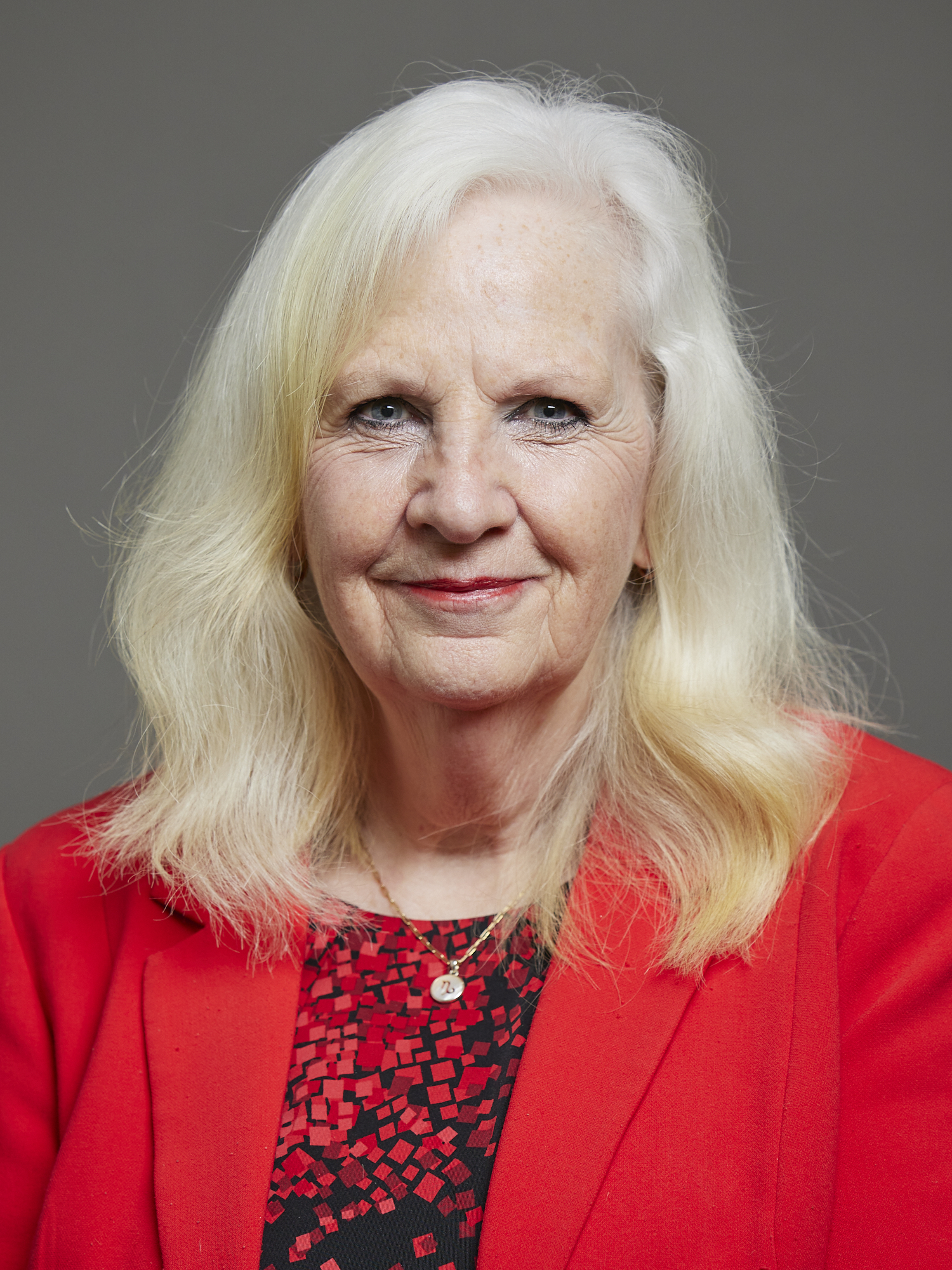
- Official portrait, 2023

Parliamentary Under-Secretary of State for Housing and Local Government
- Incumbent
- Assumed office 9 July 2024
- Prime Minister: Keir Starmer; Andy Burnham
- Preceded by: The Baroness Swinburne

Baroness-in-Waiting Government Whip
- In office 9 July 2024 – 12 June 2026
- Prime Minister: Keir Starmer

Member of the House of Lords
- Lord Temporal
- Life peerage 28 October 2022

Leader of Stevenage Borough Council
- In office 23 May 2006 – 31 December 2022
- Preceded by: Brian Hall
- Succeeded by: Richard Henry

Member of Hertfordshire County Council for Bedwell
- In office 27 March 2008 – 10 July 2024
- Preceded by: Tanis Kent

Member of Stevenage Borough Council for Symonds Green
- In office 1 May 1997 – 2 May 2024

Personal details
- Born: Sharon Jane Severn; 19 January 1956 (age 70) Welwyn Garden City, Hertfordshire, England
- Party: Labour
- Children: 3

Sharon Jane Taylor, Baroness Taylor of Stevenage OBE (née Severn; born 19 January 1956) is a British politician and life peer who has served as a Parliamentary Under-Secretary of State for Housing and Local Government and a Baroness-in-Waiting since July 2024. She was a member of Stevenage Borough Council in Hertfordshire from 1997 to 2024, and served as the leader of the council from 2006 to 2022.

== Early life ==
Taylor was born in Welwyn Garden City on 19 January 1956 to David Severn and Joan Adele Severn (née Burkitt). She attended the Girls Grammar School in Stevenage and Hatfield Polytechnic, from which she graduated with a Bachelor of Arts honours degree.

== Career ==
In 1997, Taylor became a local councillor for the Labour Party, representing her home area of Symonds Green. She was leader of the council from 2006 to 2022. Before this, she was Head of Executive Support at Hertfordshire Constabulary. Before that, she worked for John Lewis and British Aerospace.

In 2008, Taylor became a county councillor for Hertfordshire County Council. At the 2010, 2015 and 2017 general elections, she unsuccessfully contested the constituency of Stevenage. She was appointed Officer of the Order of the British Empire (OBE) for services to local government in the 2013 New Year Honours.

In October 2022, it was announced that she would receive a life peerage, sitting in the House of Lords for the Labour Party. On 28 October 2022, she was created Baroness Taylor of Stevenage, of Stevenage in the County of Hertfordshire. She was introduced to the Lords on 31 October 2022.

In February 2023, she accepted the role of patron of the Stevenage Community Trust. Taylor has been a supporter since the trust's inception in 1990.

== Personal life ==
Taylor is divorced and has three children: a son and two daughters.
