= 2007 Stevenage Borough Council election =

Election resulting in Labor Party retaining control

← 2006	3 May 2007	2008 →

13 of the 39 seats to Stevenage Borough Council 20 seats needed for a majority
	First party	Second party	Third party
Party	Labour	Liberal Democrats	Conservative
Seats before	32	4	3
Seats won	11	1	1
Seats after	32	4	3
Seat change	Steady	Steady	Steady
Popular vote	10,130	6,533	4,612
Percentage	46.8%	30.2%	21.3%
- Map showing the results of contested wards in the 2007 Stevenage Borough Council elections.
Council control before election
Labour
Council control after election
Labour

Elections to Stevenage Council were held on 3 May 2007. One third of the council was up for election; the seats which were last contested in 2003. The Labour Party stayed in overall control of the council.

After the election, the composition of the council was:

- Labour 32
- Liberal Democrat 4
- Conservative 3

== Election result ==
Stevenage local election result 2007
Party	Seats	Gains	Losses	Net gain/loss	Seats %	Votes %	Votes	+/−
Labour	11	0	0	0	84.6	46.8	10,130	+0.4%
Conservative	1	0	0	0	7.7	30.2	6,533	+0.5%
Liberal Democrats	1	0	0	0	7.7	21.3	4,612	-0.5%
BNP	0	0	0	0	0	1.0	211	+1.0%
Green	0	0	0	0	0	0.8	172	-0.1%

== Ward results ==
=== Bandley Hill ===
Location of Bandley Hill ward

Bandley Hill
Party	Candidate	Votes	%	±%
Labour	Jackie Hollywell	805	51.8	+0.9
Conservative	Freda Warner	474	30.5	+3.7
Liberal Democrats	Gordon Knight	276	17.7	−4.6
Majority		331	21.3	−2.8
Turnout		1,555	32.4	
Labour hold		Swing		

=== Bedwell ===
Location of Bedwell ward

Bedwell
Party	Candidate	Votes	%	±%
Labour	Liz Harrington	1,037	60.7	−6.4
Conservative	Christine St. Leitner	430	25.2	−7.7
Liberal Democrats	Sydney Grubert	241	14.1	+14.1
Majority		607	35.5	+1.3
Turnout		1,708	36.3	
Labour hold		Swing		

=== Chells ===
Location of Chells ward

Chells
Party	Candidate	Votes	%	±%
Labour	Howard Burrell	771	41.9	−3.6
Liberal Democrats	Audrey Griffith	750	40.8	+7.3
Conservative	Julie Seddon	318	17.3	−3.7
Majority		21	1.1	−10.9
Turnout		1,839	39.6	
Labour hold		Swing		

=== Longmeadow ===
Location of Longmeadow ward

Longmeadow
Party	Candidate	Votes	%	±%
Labour	Monika Cherney-Craw	689	41.8	−5.1
Conservative	Matthew Hurst	645	39.2	+4.9
Liberal Democrats	Ralph Baskerville	313	19.0	+0.2
Majority		44	2.6	−10.0
Turnout		1,647	37.9	
Labour hold		Swing		

=== Manor ===
Location of Manor ward

Manor
Party	Candidate	Votes	%	±%
Liberal Democrats	Robin Parker	1,091	54.4	+1.8
Conservative	Susan Smith	465	23.2	−2.2
Labour	Joseph Sherry	449	22.4	+0.4
Majority		626	31.2	+4.0
Turnout		2,005	41.3	
Liberal Democrats hold		Swing		

=== Martins Wood ===
Location of Martins Wood ward

Martins Wood
Party	Candidate	Votes	%	±%
Labour	Michael Patston	680	43.6	+0.2
Conservative	Dilys Clark	608	39.0	+4.6
Liberal Democrats	Barbara Segadelli	272	17.4	−4.8
Majority		72	4.6	−4.4
Turnout		1,560	34.3	
Labour hold		Swing		

=== Old Town ===
Location of Old Town ward

Old Town
Party	Candidate	Votes	%	±%
Labour	Michael Downing	1,018	49.0	+3.4
Conservative	James Fraser	700	33.7	+0.2
Liberal Democrats	Margaret Latham	189	9.1	−2.6
Green	Stuart Madgin	172	8.3	−0.9
Majority		318	15.3	+3.2
Turnout		2,079	43.1	
Labour hold		Swing		

=== Pin Green ===
Location of Pin Green ward

Pin Green
Party	Candidate	Votes	%	±%
Labour	Reg Smith	848	51.6	−0.8
Conservative	Leslie Clark	378	23.0	+1.6
BNP	Michael Green	211	12.9	+12.9
Liberal Democrats	Mary Griffith	205	12.5	+1.8
Majority		470	28.6	−2.4
Turnout		1,642	37.3	
Labour hold		Swing		

=== Roebuck ===
Location of Roebuck ward

Roebuck
Party	Candidate	Votes	%	±%
Labour	John Gardner	816	52.2	+2.2
Conservative	Roger Gill	480	30.7	+1.9
Liberal Democrats	Denise Baskerville	266	17.0	−4.2
Majority		336	21.5	+0.3
Turnout		1,562	34.7	
Labour hold		Swing		

=== St Nicholas ===
Location of St Nicholas ward

St Nicholas
Party	Candidate	Votes	%	±%
Labour	Ralph Raynor	742	50.8	+0.1
Conservative	Andrew Elwell	399	27.3	+1.2
Liberal Democrats	Heather Snell	320	21.9	−1.3
Majority		343	23.5	−1.1
Turnout		1,461	33.8	
Labour hold		Swing		

=== Shephall ===
Location of Shephall ward

Shephall
Party	Candidate	Votes	%	±%
Labour	Ann Webb	806	56.3	+1.2
Conservative	Anita Speight	348	24.3	+5.3
Liberal Democrats	Nicholas Baskerville	278	19.4	−6.5
Majority		458	32.0	+2.8
Turnout		1,432	32.6	
Labour hold		Swing		

=== Symonds Green ===
Location of Symonds Green ward

Symonds Green
Party	Candidate	Votes	%	±%
Labour	David Kissane	1,040	61.6	+7.7
Conservative	Matthew Wyatt	470	27.8	−2.8
Liberal Democrats	Clive Hearmon	179	10.6	−4.9
Majority		570	33.8	+10.5
Turnout		1,689	38.8	
Labour hold		Swing		

=== Woodfield ===
Location of Woodfield ward

Woodfield
Party	Candidate	Votes	%	±%
Conservative	Graham Clark	818	55.3	+0.9
Labour	Richard Rawlings	429	29.0	+3.6
Liberal Democrats	Katherine Lloyd	232	15.7	−4.5
Majority		389	26.3	−2.7
Turnout		1,479	37.1	
Conservative hold		Swing		
