= 2021 Stevenage Borough Council election =

UK local election

← 2019	6 May 2021	2022 →

14 of the 39 seats to Stevenage Borough Council 20 seats needed for a majority
	First party	Second party	Third party
Party	Labour	Conservative	Liberal Democrats
Seats before	27	7	5
Seats won	6	6	2
Seats after	22	11	6
Seat change	▼5	▲4	▲1
- Map showing the results of the 2021 Stevenage Borough Council election
Council control before election
Labour
Council control after election
Labour

Elections to Stevenage Borough Council took place on 6 May 2021. This was on the same day as other local elections across the United Kingdom. One third of the council was up for election, plus a by-election in Roebuck ward; the seats which were last contested in 2016. The Labour Party retained control of the council, which it has held continuously since 1973, but with a reduced majority.

== Results summary ==
2021 Stevenage Borough Council election
Party	This election			Full council			This election		
Party	Seats	Net	Seats %	Other	Total	Total %	Votes	Votes %	+/−
Labour Co-op	6	▼5	42.9	16	22	56.4	9,199	37.7	-0.4
Conservative	6	▲4	42.9	5	11	28.2	9,724	39.8	+8.1
Liberal Democrats	2	▲1	14.3	4	6	15.4	3,864	15.8	-6.6
Green	0	Steady	0.0	0	0	0.0	826	3.4	-4.4
Independent	0	Steady	0.0	0	0	0.0	348	1.4	New
TUSC	0	Steady	0.0	0	0	0.0	329	1.3	New
Reform UK	0	Steady	0.0	0	0	0.0	78	0.3	New
UKIP	0	Steady	0.0	0	0	0.0	49	0.2	New

== Ward results ==
=== Bandley Hill ===
Bandley Hill
Party	Candidate	Votes	%	±%
Conservative	Wendy Kerby	828	47.9	+9.0
Labour Co-op	Michelle Gardner	695	40.2	−5.5
Liberal Democrats	Andrew Anderson	168	9.7	−5.7
TUSC	Barbara Clare	39	2.3	New
Majority		133	7.7	—
Turnout		1,730	34.1	+4.6
Conservative gain from Labour Co-op		Swing	▲7.3	

=== Bedwell ===
Bedwell
Party	Candidate	Votes	%	±%
Labour Co-op	Matt Creasey	979	54.2	±0.0
Conservative	David Hurst	596	33.0	+9.3
Liberal Democrats	Nick MacMillan	175	9.7	−4.5
TUSC	Steve Glennon	55	3.0	New
Majority		383	21.2	−9.2
Turnout		1,805	32.0	+4.1
Labour Co-op hold		Swing	▼4.7	

=== Chells ===
Chells
Party	Candidate	Votes	%	±%
Liberal Democrats	Julie Ashley-Wren	600	34.9	−11.7
Labour Co-op	Forhad Chowdhury	499	29.0	+1.9
Conservative	Matthew Wyatt	492	28.6	+11.4
Green	David Ingarfill	96	5.6	−3.5
TUSC	Roger Charles	33	1.9	New
Majority		101	5.9	−13.8
Turnout		1,720	34.8	+1.3
Liberal Democrats gain from Labour Co-op		Swing	▼6.8	

=== Longmeadow ===
Longmeadow
Party	Candidate	Votes	%	±%
Conservative	Adam Mitchell	835	50.9	+5.6
Labour Co-op	Chris Webb	550	33.5	−6.8
Liberal Democrats	David Barks	94	5.7	−8.7
Green	Richard Dyer	91	5.5	New
UKIP	Peter Colley	49	3.0	New
TUSC	Helen Kerr	23	1.4	New
Majority		285	17.4	+12.5
Turnout		1,642	37.2	+5.5
Conservative hold		Swing	▲6.2	

=== Manor ===
Manor
Party	Candidate	Votes	%	±%
Liberal Democrats	Graham Snell	1,125	55.7	−19.9
Conservative	Dan Buckingham	487	24.1	+10.6
Labour Co-op	Louisa Barr	315	15.6	+4.7
Green	Dean Carpenter	92	4.6	New
Majority		638	31.6	−30.6
Turnout		2,019	39.5	−0.2
Liberal Democrats hold		Swing	▼15.3	

=== Martins Wood ===
Martins Wood
Party	Candidate	Votes	%	±%
Labour Co-op	Myla Arceno	571	34.8	−1.5
Conservative	Janet Munro	504	30.7	+3.1
Liberal Democrats	Jill Brinkworth	499	30.4	−5.7
Reform UK	Rob Henry	43	2.6	New
TUSC	Mark Pickersgill	24	1.5	New
Majority		67	4.1	+2.2
Turnout		1,641	35.5	+3.4
Labour Co-op hold		Swing	▼2.3	

=== Old Town ===
Old Town
Party	Candidate	Votes	%	±%
Conservative	John Duncan	1,027	40.1	+2.1
Labour Co-op	Jim Brown	907	35.4	−4.2
Independent	John Spiers	348	13.6	New
Green	Elizabeth Sturges	191	7.5	−6.5
Liberal Democrats	Madani Mannan	89	3.5	−4.9
Majority		120	4.7	N/A
Turnout		2,562	40.5	+4.9
Conservative gain from Labour Co-op		Swing	▲3.2	

=== Pin Green ===
Pin Green
Party	Candidate	Votes	%	±%
Labour Co-op	Maureen McKay	752	46.1	+3.1
Conservative	Grant Prest	650	39.8	+7.6
Green	Naomi Lovelace-Collins	118	7.2	−9.0
Liberal Democrats	Charles Littleton	113	6.9	−1.8
Majority		102	6.3	−4.5
Turnout		1,633	34.6	+4.5
Labour Co-op hold		Swing	▼4.5	

=== Roebuck ===
Roebuck (2 seats due to by-election)
Party	Candidate	Votes	%	±%
Conservative	Chris Howells	790	52.5	+8.8
Conservative	Nicholas Leech	611	40.6	+6.9
Labour Co-op	Allen Brown	593	39.4	−4.4
Labour Co-op	Monika Cherney-Craw	551	36.6	−7.2
Liberal Democrats	Nigel Bye	232	15.4	+4.5
Liberal Democrats	Paul Barber	197	13.1	+2.2
TUSC	Bryan Clare	33	2.2	New
Turnout		—	33.5	
Conservative gain from Labour Co-op				
Conservative gain from Labour Co-op				

=== Shephall ===
Shephall
Party	Candidate	Votes	%	±%
Labour Co-op	Simon Speller	685	47.5	+3.7
Conservative	Roni Hearn	613	42.5	+8.8
Liberal Democrats	Richard Reece	83	5.8	−5.1
TUSC	Michael Malocco	60	4.2	New
Majority		72	5.0	−12.0
Turnout		1,441	31.6	+3.9
Labour Co-op hold		Swing	▼2.6	

=== St Nicholas ===
St Nicholas
Party	Candidate	Votes	%	±%
Labour Co-op	Richard Henry	891	46.3	−0.6
Conservative	Layla Buckingham	710	36.9	−1.3
Liberal Democrats	Hazel Jones	156	8.1	−6.8
Green	Jacqueline Botevyle	125	6.5	New
TUSC	Amber Gentleman	42	2.2	New
Majority		181	9.4	+0.8
Turnout		1,924	34.5	+2.4
Labour Co-op hold		Swing	▲0.4	

=== Symonds Green ===
Symonds Green
Party	Candidate	Votes	%	±%
Labour Co-op	Jackie Hollywell	717	43.0	−0.6
Conservative	Jack Ingarfill	712	42.7	+8.0
Green	Richard Warr	113	6.8	−5.0
Liberal Democrats	Clive Hearmon	106	6.4	−3.5
TUSC	Trevor Palmer	20	1.2	New
Majority		5	0.3	−8.6
Turnout		1,668	36.9	+3.4
Labour Co-op hold		Swing	▼4.3	

=== Woodfield ===
Woodfield
Party	Candidate	Votes	%	±%
Conservative	Margaret Notley	869	53.5	+6.7
Labour Co-op	Alistair Gordon	494	30.4	+1.3
Liberal Democrats	Neil Brinkworth	227	14.0	−10.0
Reform UK	Amodio Amato	35	2.2	New
Majority		375	23.1	
Turnout		1.625	39.4	
Conservative hold		Swing	▲2.7	
