= 2019 Stevenage Borough Council election =

2019 UK local government election

← 2018	2 May 2019	2021 →

13 of the 39 seats to Stevenage Borough Council 20 seats needed for a majority
	First party	Second party	Third party
Party	Labour	Conservative	Liberal Democrats
Seats before	26	9	4
Seats won	9	2	2
Seats after	27	7	5
Seat change	▲1	▼2	▲1
- Map showing the results of contested wards in the 2019 Stevenage Borough Council elections. Labour in red, Conservatives in blue and Liberal Democrats in yellow.
Council control before election
Labour
Council control after election
Labour

Elections to Stevenage Borough Council took place on 2 May 2019. This was on the same day as other local elections across the United Kingdom. One third of the council was up for election; the seats that were last contested in 2015. The Labour Party retained control of the council, which it has held continuously since 1973.

== Results summary ==
2019 Stevenage Borough Council election
Party	This election			Full council			This election		
Party	Seats	Net	Seats %	Other	Total	Total %	Votes	Votes %	+/−
Labour	9	▲1	69.2	18	27	69.2	7,860	38.1	-6.1
Conservative	2	▼2	15.4	5	7	17.9	6,538	31.7	-6.1
Liberal Democrats	2	▲1	15.4	3	5	12.8	4,634	22.4	+7.5
Green	0	Steady	0.0	0	0	0.0	1,610	7.8	+4.7

== Ward results ==
=== Bandley Hill ===
Location of Bandley Hill ward

Bandley Hill
Party	Candidate	Votes	%	±%
Labour Co-op	Adrian Richard Brown	674	45.7	−1.7
Conservative	Nicholas Rohan Foster	574	38.9	−5.0
Liberal Democrats	Andrew David Anderson	227	15.4	+6.6
Majority		100	6.8	
Turnout		1,475	29.49	
Labour gain from Conservative		Swing		

=== Bedwell ===
Location of Bedwell ward

Bedwell
Party	Candidate	Votes	%	±%
Labour Co-op	Liz Harrington	813	54.2	−6.2
Conservative	Nicholas John Leech	356	23.7	−6.8
Green	Victoria Louise Snelling	213	14.2	+5.1
Liberal Democrats	Nick Macmillan	119	7.9	New
Majority		457	30.5	
Turnout		1,501	27.85	
Labour hold		Swing		

=== Chells ===
Location of Chells ward

Chells
Party	Candidate	Votes	%	±%
Liberal Democrats	Stephen John Booth	766	46.6	+0.3
Labour Co-op	Pam Stuart	446	27.1	−5.6
Conservative	Matthew Paul Wyatt	282	17.2	−3.8
Green	David Peter Ingarfill	149	9.1	New
Majority		320	19.5	
Turnout		1,643	33.54	
Liberal Democrats gain from Labour		Swing		

=== Longmeadow ===
Location of Longmeadow ward

Longmeadow
Party	Candidate	Votes	%	±%
Conservative	Alexander Michael Farquharson	682	45.3	−2.8
Labour	Chris Webb	608	40.3	−0.3
Liberal Democrats	Nigel Robert Bye	217	14.4	+3.1
Majority		74	5.0	
Turnout		1,507	31.70	
Conservative hold		Swing		

=== Manor ===
Location of Manor ward

Manor
Party	Candidate	Votes	%	±%
Liberal Democrats	Robin Gareth Parker	1,484	75.6	+14.8
Conservative	James David Corrigan	264	13.5	−6.8
Labour	David Stanley Wood	214	10.9	−7.9
Majority		1,220	62.1	
Turnout		1,962	39.73	
Liberal Democrats hold		Swing		

=== Martins Wood ===
Location of Martins Wood ward

Martins Wood
Party	Candidate	Votes	%	±%
Labour Co-op	Teresa Lynn Callaghan	526	36.3	−5.2
Liberal Democrats	Jill Brinkworth	524	36.1	+11.3
Conservative	Bret Ray Facey	401	27.6	−6.1
Majority		2	0.2	
Turnout		1,451	32.06	
Labour hold		Swing		

=== Old Town ===
Location of Old Town ward

Old Town
Party	Candidate	Votes	%	±%
Labour Co-op	Loraine Graziella Rossati	881	39.6	−3.1
Conservative	James Robert Phillip Fraser	845	38.0	−4.8
Green	Elizabeth Genevieve Sturges	312	14.0	+5.8
Liberal Democrats	George Eric Pinder	187	8.4	+2.1
Majority		36	1.6	
Turnout		2,225	35.59	
Labour gain from Conservative		Swing		

=== Pin Green ===
Location of Pin Green ward

Pin Green
Party	Candidate	Votes	%	±%
Labour Co-op	Jeannette Audrey Thomas	606	43.0	−8.5
Conservative	Andy Facey	454	32.2	−4.6
Green	Naomi Ruth Collins	228	16.2	+4.5
Liberal Democrats	Ross London	122	8.7	New
Majority		152	10.8	
Turnout		1,410	30.10	
Labour hold		Swing		

=== Roebuck ===
Location of Roebuck ward

Roebuck
Party	Candidate	Votes	%	±%
Labour Co-op	John Gardner	698	43.8	−4.3
Conservative	Janet Marie Munro	537	33.7	−6.6
Green	John Malocco Martin	185	11.6	+6.5
Liberal Democrats	Paul Matthew Barber	174	10.9	+4.8
Majority		161	10.1	
Turnout		1,594	31.75	
Labour hold		Swing		

=== St Nicholas ===
Location of St Nicholas ward

St Nicholas
Party	Candidate	Votes	%	±%
Labour Co-op	Claire Lesley Parris	787	46.9	−5.0
Conservative	Mandi Tandi	642	38.2	+0.6
Liberal Democrats	Daniel Peter Charles Snell	250	14.9	+9.7
Majority		145	8.7	
Turnout		1,679	32.10	
Labour hold		Swing		

=== Shephall ===
Location of Shephall ward

Shephall
Party	Candidate	Votes	%	±%
Labour Co-op	Sarah Jane Mead	580	46.5	−6.9
Conservative	Celia Lawrence	368	29.5	−5.9
Green	Michael Malocco	201	16.1	+9.9
Liberal Democrats	Charles Galton Darwin Littleton	99	7.9	+2.9
Majority		212	17.0	
Turnout		1,248	27.74	
Labour hold		Swing		

=== Symonds Green ===
Location of Symonds Green ward

Symonds Green
Party	Candidate	Votes	%	±%
Labour	Michael Downing	639	43.6	−8.7
Conservative	Alexandra Marianne Young	509	34.7	−2.5
Green	Richard David Warr	173	11.8	+6.8
Liberal Democrats	Clive Hearmon	145	9.9	+4.4
Majority		130	8.9	
Turnout		1,466	33.48	
Labour hold		Swing		

=== Woodfield ===
Location of Woodfield ward

Woodfield
Party	Candidate	Votes	%	±%
Conservative	Graham Edward Lawrence	624	46.8	−7.1
Labour	Jim Callaghan	388	29.1	−6.0
Liberal Democrats	Neil Geoffrey Brinkworth	320	24.0	+13.0
Majority		236	17.7	
Turnout		1,332	32.10	
Conservative hold		Swing		
