= 2018 Stevenage Borough Council election =

Elections in United Kingdom

← 2016	3 May 2018	2019 →

13 of the 39 seats to Stevenage Borough Council 20 seats needed for a majority
	First party	Second party	Third party
Party	Labour	Conservative	Liberal Democrats
Seats before	29	7	3
Seats won	8	3	2
Seats after	26	9	4
Seat change	▼3	▲2	▲1
Popular vote	10,035	8,583	3,387
Percentage	44.2%	37.8%	14.9%
- Map showing the results of contested wards in the 2018 Stevenage Borough Council elections. Labour in red, Conservatives in blue and Liberal Democrats in yellow.
Council control before election
Labour
Council control after election
Labour

Elections to Stevenage Borough Council took place on 3 May 2018. This was on the same day as other local elections across the United Kingdom. One third of the council was up for election; the seats which were last contested in 2014. The Labour Party retained control of the council, which it had held continuously since 1973.

== Results summary ==
Stevenage Borough Council election, 2018
Party	Seats	Gains	Losses	Net gain/loss	Seats %	Votes %	Votes	+/−
Labour	26	0	3	▼3		44.2	10,035	▲1.6
Conservative	9	2	0	▲2		37.8	8,583	▲6.3
Liberal Democrats	4	1	0	▲1		14.9	3,387	▲2.3
Green	0	0	0	Steady		3.1	715	▼1.0
Total	39						22,720	
Labour hold								

== Ward results ==
=== Bandley Hill ===
Location of Bandley Hill ward

Bandley Hill
Party	Candidate	Votes	%	±%
Labour	Joan Lloyd	772	47.4	−2.2
Conservative	Nicholas Foster	715	43.9	+5.7
Liberal Democrats	Andrew Anderson	143	8.8	+2.6
Majority		57	3.5	
Turnout		1,630	32.01	
Labour hold		Swing		

=== Bedwell ===
Location of Bedwell ward

Bedwell
Party	Candidate	Votes	%	±%
Labour	Lizzy Kelly	1,001	60.4	+4.6
Conservative	Michelle Frith	506	30.5	+5.2
Green	Victoria Snelling	151	9.1	+0.1
Majority		495	29.9	
Turnout		1,658	31.35	
Labour hold		Swing		

=== Chells ===
Location of Chells ward

Chells
Party	Candidate	Votes	%	±%
Liberal Democrats	Tom Wren	796	46.3	+16.4
Labour	Pam Stuart	562	32.7	−3.2
Conservative	Matthew Wyatt	360	21.0	−4.4
Majority		234	13.6	
Turnout		1,718	34.65	
Liberal Democrats gain from Labour		Swing		

=== Longmeadow ===
Location of Longmeadow ward

Longmeadow
Party	Candidate	Votes	%	±%
Conservative	Doug Bainbridge	789	48.1	+7.3
Labour	David Wood	665	40.6	+0.2
Liberal Democrats	Stephen Booth	185	11.3	+2.9
Majority		124	7.5	
Turnout		1,639	36.31	
Conservative gain from Labour		Swing		

=== Manor ===
Location of Manor ward

Manor
Party	Candidate	Votes	%	±%
Liberal Democrats	Andy McGuinness	1,196	60.8	+1.8
Conservative	Matthew Clarke	400	20.3	+0.3
Labour	David Martin	370	18.8	+1.8
Majority		796	40.5	
Turnout		1,966	39.27	
Liberal Democrats hold		Swing		

=== Martins Wood ===
Location of Martins Wood ward

Martins Wood
Party	Candidate	Votes	%	±%
Labour	Lloyd Briscoe	639	41.5	−7.1
Conservative	Joseph Barnes	518	33.7	−2.5
Liberal Democrats	Jill Brinkworth	382	24.8	+19.4
Majority		121	7.8	
Turnout		1,539	33.48	
Labour hold		Swing		

=== Old Town ===
Location of Old Town ward

Old Town
Party	Candidate	Votes	%	±%
Conservative	Jody Hanafin	1,012	42.8	+9.9
Labour	Monika Cherney-Craw	1,010	42.7	−0.1
Green	Elizabeth Sturges	194	8.2	+1.9
Liberal Democrats	Mason Humberstone	149	6.3	+2.0
Majority		2	0.1	
Turnout		2,365	37.65	
Conservative gain from Labour		Swing		

=== Pin Green ===
Location of Pin Green ward

Pin Green
Party	Candidate	Votes	%	±%
Labour	Lin Martin-Haugh	811	51.5	+1.6
Conservative	Charlie Laing	579	36.8	+5.5
Green	Vicky Lovelace	184	11.7	+3.2
Majority		232	14.7	
Turnout		1,574	32.89	
Labour hold		Swing		

=== Roebuck ===
Location of Roebuck ward

Roebuck
Party	Candidate	Votes	%	±%
Labour	Sarah-Jane Potter	842	48.1	+4.7
Conservative	Alex Farquharson	706	40.3	+11.7
Liberal Democrats	Nigel Bye	113	6.5	+1.8
Green	Martin Malocco	90	5.1	−0.1
Majority		136	7.8	
Turnout		1,751	34.23	
Labour hold		Swing		

=== Shephall ===
Location of Shephall ward

Shephall
Party	Candidate	Votes	%	±%
Labour	Rob Broom	727	53.4	+0.3
Conservative	Michael Hearn	482	35.4	+6.8
Green	Michael Malocco	84	6.2	−3.8
Liberal Democrats	Paul Barber	68	5.0	New
Majority		245	18.0	
Turnout		1,361	29.79	
Labour hold		Swing		

=== St Nicholas ===
Location of St Nicholas ward

St Nicholas
Party	Candidate	Votes	%	±%
Labour	Sandra Barr	951	51.9	+0.7
Conservative	Amanda Tandi	690	37.6	+5.4
Green	Naomi Collins	96	5.2	New
Liberal Democrats	Matthew Snell	96	5.2	−3.6
Majority		261	14.3	
Turnout		1,833	34.87	
Labour hold		Swing		

=== Symonds Green ===
Location of Symonds Green ward

Symonds Green
Party	Candidate	Votes	%	±%
Labour	Sharon Taylor	847	52.3	+6.0
Conservative	Alex Young	602	37.2	+8.3
Liberal Democrats	Clive Hearmon	89	5.5	+1.1
Green	Richard Warr	81	5.0	+1.4
Majority		245	15.1	
Turnout		1,619	36.36	
Labour hold		Swing		

=== Woodfield ===
Location of Woodfield ward

Woodfield
Party	Candidate	Votes	%	±%
Conservative	Phil Bibby	835	53.9	+8.3
Labour	Irfan Javed	543	35.1	+4.6
Liberal Democrats	Neil Brinkworth	170	11.0	+5.9
Majority		292	18.8	
Turnout		1,548	36.37	
Conservative hold		Swing		
