= 2011 Stevenage Borough Council election =

2011 election of council members in the Stevenage Borough Council

← 2010	5 May 2011	2012 →

13 of the 39 seats to Stevenage Borough Council 20 seats needed for a majority
	First party	Second party	Third party
Party	Labour	Conservative	Liberal Democrats
Seats before	27	9	3
Seats won	8	4	1
Seats after	27	9	3
Seat change	Steady	Steady	Steady
Popular vote	12,015	8,011	2,649
Percentage	46.8%	31.2%	10.3%
- Map showing the results of contested wards in the 2011 Stevenage Borough Council elections.
Council control before election
Labour
Council control after election
Labour

Elections to Stevenage Council were held on 5 May 2011. One third of the council seats were in the election; the seats which were last contested in 2007. There were no changes from 2007.

After the election, the composition of the council remained as:

- Labour 27
- Conservative 9
- Liberal Democrat 3

== Election result ==
Stevenage local election result 2011
Party	Seats	Gains	Losses	Net gain/loss	Seats %	Votes %	Votes	+/−
Labour	11	0	0	0	84.6	46.8	12,015	+10.9
Conservative	1	0	0	0	7.7	31.2	8,011	-3.7
Liberal Democrats	1	0	0	0	7.7	10.3	2,649	-11.6
UKIP	0	0	0	0	0	10.0	2,576	+3.7
TUSC	0	0	0	0	0	1.2	312	+1.2
Green	0	0	0	0	0	0.4	114	+0.4

== Ward results ==
=== Bandley Hill ===
Location of Bandley Hill ward

Bandley Hill
Party	Candidate	Votes	%	±%
Labour	Jackie Hollywell	919	47.3	+8.7
Conservative	Sharon Hearn	642	33.0	−2.5
UKIP	Angela Denness	203	10.4	+1.2
Liberal Democrats	Barbara Segadelli	118	6.1	−10.5
TUSC	Mark Pickersgill	61	3.1	+3.1
Majority		277	14.3	+11.2
Turnout		1,943	39.9	−21.6
Labour hold		Swing		

=== Bedwell ===
Location of Bedwell ward

Bedwell
Party	Candidate	Votes	%	±%
Labour	Liz Harrington	1,107	56.7	+16.9
Conservative	Ellin Joseph	421	21.6	−5.0
UKIP	Sean Howlett	258	13.2	−1.8
Green	Ian Cropton	114	5.8	+5.8
TUSC	Steve Glennon	53	2.7	+2.7
Majority		686	35.1	+21.9
Turnout		1,953	39.8	−20.2
Labour hold		Swing		

=== Chells ===
Location of Chells ward

Chells
Party	Candidate	Votes	%	±%
Labour	Howard Burrell	986	48.0	+8.9
Conservative	Matthew Wyatt	517	25.1	−5.9
Liberal Democrats	Tim Neale	299	14.5	−15.4
UKIP	Rachalle Sainsbury	254	12.4	+12.4
Majority		469	22.8	+14.7
Turnout		2,056	41.9	−23.3
Labour hold		Swing		

=== Longmeadow ===
Location of Longmeadow ward

Longmeadow
Party	Candidate	Votes	%	±%
Labour	Monika Cherney-Craw	835	41.9	+7.5
Conservative	Michelle Calcutt	723	36.3	−1.2
Liberal Democrats	Ralph Baskerville	195	9.8	−9.6
UKIP	Vicky Gabriel	177	8.9	+0.1
TUSC	Helen Kerr	62	3.1	+3.1
Majority		112	5.6	+2.5
Turnout		1,992	44.5	−22.7
Labour hold		Swing		

=== Manor ===
Location of Manor ward

Manor
Party	Candidate	Votes	%	±%
Liberal Democrats	Robin Parker	982	41.3	+0.4
Labour	Joseph Sherry	616	25.9	+5.5
Conservative	Susan Smith	610	25.7	−7.1
UKIP	Julie Seddon	168	7.1	+1.1
Majority		366	15.4	+7.3
Turnout		2,376	47.6	−23.4
Liberal Democrats hold		Swing		

=== Martins Wood ===
Location of Martins Wood ward

Martins Wood
Party	Candidate	Votes	%	±%
Labour	Sarah Walker	929	47.9	+15.8
Conservative	Bill Whelan	690	35.6	−1.0
UKIP	Pat Jones	189	9.7	+1.4
Liberal Democrats	Kevin Aylward	131	6.8	−11.8
Majority		239	12.3	+7.8
Turnout		1,939	41.8	−20.5
Labour hold		Swing		

=== Old Town ===
Location of Old Town ward

Old Town
Party	Candidate	Votes	%	±%
Labour	Hugh Tessier	1,219	47.7	+11.0
Conservative	Catherine Bibby	946	37.0	−1.7
UKIP	Bernard Maddox	197	7.7	+1.1
Liberal Democrats	Matthew Snell	196	7.7	−10.3
Majority		273	10.7	+8.7
Turnout		2,558	43.1	−23.0
Labour hold		Swing		

=== Pin Green ===
Location of Pin Green ward

Pin Green
Party	Candidate	Votes	%	±%
Labour	Jeannette Thomas	949	50.8	+9.9
Conservative	Ted Jones	595	31.9	+0.9
UKIP	Kevin Flavell	198	10.6	+4.2
Liberal Democrats	Scott Copsey	126	6.7	−10.2
Majority		354	19.0	+9.1
Turnout		1,868	41.2	−21.9
Labour hold		Swing		

=== Roebuck ===
Location of Roebuck ward

Roebuck
Party	Candidate	Votes	%	±%
Labour	John Gardner	915	48.9	+11.7
Conservative	Harvey Page	618	33.1	−0.1
UKIP	Roy Worden	274	14.7	+4.4
TUSC	Bryan Clare	61	3.3	+3.3
Majority		297	15.9	+11.9
Turnout		1,868	40.1	−21.9
Labour hold		Swing		

=== Shephall ===
Location of Shephall ward

Shephall
Party	Candidate	Votes	%	±%
Labour	Ann Webb	887	54.4	+12.9
Conservative	Anita Speight	366	22.4	−6.0
UKIP	Maureen Dilley	155	9.5	−1.9
Liberal Democrats	Nicholas Baskerville	149	9.1	−9.6
TUSC	Barbara Clare	75	4.6	+4.6
Majority		521	31.9	+18.8
Turnout		1,632	37.0	−21.0
Labour hold		Swing		

=== St Nicholas ===
Location of St Nicholas ward

St Nicholas
Party	Candidate	Votes	%	±%
Labour	Ralph Raynor	959	52.8	+11.4
Conservative	Gillian Mould	501	27.6	−4.6
Liberal Democrats	Heather Snell	181	10.0	−11.9
UKIP	Ken Neal	176	9.7	+9.7
Majority		458	25.2	+16.0
Turnout		1,817	40.8	−20.4
Labour hold		Swing		

=== Symonds Green ===
Location of Symonds Green ward

Symonds Green
Party	Candidate	Votes	%	±%
Labour	David Kissane	1,120	58.4	+16.0
Conservative	Paul Mould	539	28.1	−10.4
UKIP	Carol Knowles	145	7.6	+7.6
Liberal Democrats	Clive Hearmon	115	6.0	−13.1
Majority		581	30.3	+26.4
Turnout		1,919	43.1	−21.4
Labour hold		Swing		

=== Woodfield ===
Location of Woodfield ward

Woodfield
Party	Candidate	Votes	%	±%
Conservative	Graham Clark	843	48.0	−4.8
Labour	Stephen Pattison	574	32.7	+8.3
UKIP	Marion Mason	182	10.4	+10.4
Liberal Democrats	Katherine Lloyd-Manning	157	8.9	−13.9
Majority		269	9.6	−18.8
Turnout		1,756	42.5	−24.7
Conservative hold		Swing		
