= 2004 Stevenage Borough Council election =

2004 UK local government election

← 2003	10 June 2004	2006 →

13 of the 39 seats to Stevenage Borough Council 20 seats needed for a majority
	First party	Second party	Third party
Party	Labour	Conservative	Liberal Democrats
Seats before	33	3	3
Seats won	10	1	1
Seats after	32	4	3
Seat change	▼1	▲1	Steady
Popular vote	8,749	6,224	6,852
Percentage	39.1%	27.8%	30.6%
- Map showing the results of contested wards in the 2004 Stevenage Borough Council elections.
Council control before election
Labour
Council control after election
Labour

Elections to Stevenage Council were held on 10 June 2004. One third of the council was up for election; the seats which were last contested in 2000. The Labour Party stayed in overall control of the council.

After the election, the composition of the council was:

- Labour 32
- Liberal Democrat 4
- Conservative 3

== Election result ==
Stevenage local election result 2004
Party	Seats	Gains	Losses	Net gain/loss	Seats %	Votes %	Votes	+/−
Labour	10			-1	76.9	39.8	8,749	-7.9%
Liberal Democrats	2			+1	15.4	28.3	6,224	+2.9%
Conservative	1			0	7.7	29.4	6,460	+4.3%
Green	0			0	0	1.9	413	+0.5%
Socialist Alternative	0			0	0	0.5	119	+0.1%

== Ward results ==
=== Bandley Hill ===
Location of Bandley Hill ward

Bandley Hill
Party	Candidate	Votes	%	±%
Labour	Lillian Strange	739	45.0	−7.2
Conservative	Mollie Cawthorn	558	34.0	+5.1
Liberal Democrats	Sean McManus	345	21.0	+2.1
Majority		181	11.0	−12.3
Turnout		1,642	35.1	−11.9

=== Bedwell ===
Location of Bedwell ward

Bedwell
Party	Candidate	Votes	%	±%
Labour	David Cullen	869	49.3	−10.2
Conservative	Christine Saint-Leitner	408	23.2	+4.5
Liberal Democrats	John Meacham	365	20.7	+3.7
Socialist Alternative	Stephen Glennon	119	6.8	+2.0
Majority		461	26.1	−14.7
Turnout		1,761	38.7	−11.6

=== Chells ===
Location of Chells ward

Chells
Party	Candidate	Votes	%	±%
Liberal Democrats	Leonard Lambert	828	45.6	+12.9
Labour	Jeannette Thomas	643	35.4	−16.5
Conservative	Jody Hanafin	344	19.0	+3.6
Majority		185	10.2	
Turnout		1,815	40.5	−15.1
Liberal Democrats gain from Labour		Swing		

=== Longmeadow ===
Location of Longmeadow ward

Longmeadow
Party	Candidate	Votes	%	±%
Labour	Bruce Jackson	619	36.6	−10.0
Conservative	Matthew Hurst	606	35.9	+7.8
Liberal Democrats	Ralph Baskerville	464	27.5	+2.2
Majority		13	0.7	−17.8
Turnout		1,689	39.6	−12.2

=== Manor ===
Location of Manor ward

Manor
Party	Candidate	Votes	%	±%
Liberal Democrats	Graham Snell	1,232	59.2	−7.1
Conservative	Prudence Howells	458	22.0	+5.2
Labour	Howard Burrell	392	18.8	+2.0
Majority		774	37.2	−12.3
Turnout		2,082	43.9	−14.1

=== Martins Wood ===
Location of Martins Wood ward

Martins Wood
Party	Candidate	Votes	%	±%
Labour	David Royall	585	35.5	−7.3
Conservative	Ralph Dimelow	526	31.9	+2.3
Liberal Democrats	Barbara Segadelli	330	20.0	+2.0
Green	Ian Murrill	207	12.6	+3.0
Majority		59	3.6	−9.6
Turnout		1,648	37.2	−11.8

=== Old Town ===
Location of Old Town ward

Old Town
Party	Candidate	Votes	%	±%
Labour	Hugh Tessier	870	40.4	−6.0
Conservative	Dilys Clark	746	34.6	+6.9
Liberal Democrats	Jennifer Moorcroft	333	15.5	−2.4
Green	Bernard Chapman	206	9.6	+1.6
Majority		124	5.8	−12.9
Turnout		2,155	46.3	−11.0

=== Pin Green ===
Location of Pin Green ward

Pin Green
Party	Candidate	Votes	%	±%
Labour	Simon Speller	762	46.5	−7.5
Conservative	Leslie Clark	503	30.7	+6.1
Liberal Democrats	Mary Griffith	375	22.9	+1.6
Majority		259	15.8	−13.6
Turnout		1,640	37.7	−14.5

=== Roebuck ===
Location of Roebuck ward

Roebuck
Party	Candidate	Votes	%	±%
Labour	John Lloyd	760	44.5	−5.2
Conservative	Anita Speight	505	29.6	+4.0
Liberal Democrats	Gordon Knight	441	25.8	+1.1
Majority		255	14.9	−9.2
Turnout		1,706	39.3	−9.7

=== St Nicholas ===
Location of St Nicholas ward

St Nicholas
Party	Candidate	Votes	%	±%
Labour	Richard Henry	586	41.2	−7.3
Conservative	Ian Pritchard	421	29.6	+4.5
Liberal Democrats	Heather Snell	414	29.1	+2.6
Majority		165	11.6	−10.4
Turnout		1,421	33.9	−13.1

=== Shephall ===
Location of Shephall ward

Shephall
Party	Candidate	Votes	%	±%
Labour	Jack Pickersgill	838	52.6	−8.6
Conservative	Freda Warner	392	24.6	+5.2
Liberal Democrats	Nicholas Baskerville	362	22.7	+3.3
Majority		446	28.0	−13.8
Turnout		1,592	37.2	−14.5

=== Symonds Green ===
Location of Symonds Green ward

Symonds Green
Party	Candidate	Votes	%	±%
Labour	Anthony Turner	784	46.6	−13.9
Conservative	Galina Dimelow	555	33.0	+8.5
Liberal Democrats	Katherine Lloyd	342	20.3	+5.4
Majority		229	13.6	−22.4
Turnout		1,681	38.6	−15.1

=== Woodfield ===
Location of Woodfield ward

Woodfield
Party	Candidate	Votes	%	±%
Conservative	Margaret Notley	830	54.4	+8.2
Liberal Democrats	Audrey Griffith	393	25.8	+7.5
Labour	Ashraf Ismail	302	19.8	−15.7
Majority		437	28.6	+17.9
Turnout		1,525	39.6	−16.7
