= 2003 Stevenage Borough Council election =

2003 UK local government election

| ← 2002 | 1 May 2003 | 2004 → |

13 of the 39 seats to Stevenage Borough Council 20 seats needed for a majority
| | First party | Second party | Third party |
|---|---|---|---|
| Party | Labour | Conservative | Liberal Democrats |
| Seats before | 33 | 3 | 3 |
| Seats won | 11 | 1 | 1 |
| Seats after | 33 | 3 | 3 |
| Seat change | Steady | Steady | Steady |
| Popular vote | 14,542 | 7,733 | 7,659 |
| Percentage | 47.7% | 25.4% | 25.1% |
- Map showing the results of contested wards in the 2003 Stevenage Borough Council elections.
Council control before election
Labour
Council control after election
Labour

Elections to Stevenage Council in Hertfordshire, England were held on 1 May 2003. One third of the council was up for election; the seats of the candidates who finished first in each ward in the all-out election of 1999. The Labour Party stayed in overall control of the council, as had been predicted before the election. Overall turnout was 52.2%.

After the election, the composition of the council was:

- Labour 33
- Liberal Democrat 3
- Conservative 3

== Election result ==
Stevenage local election result 2003
| Party | Seats | Gains | Losses | Net gain/loss | Seats % | Votes % | Votes | +/− |
|---|---|---|---|---|---|---|---|---|
| Labour | 11 | | | 0 | 84.6 | 47.7 | 14,542 | -5.5% |
| Liberal Democrats | 1 | | | 0 | 7.7 | 25.4 | 7,733 | +6.7% |
| Conservative | 1 | | | 0 | 7.7 | 25.1 | 7,659 | -1.0% |
| Green | 0 | | | 0 | 0 | 1.4 | 431 | -0.3% |
| Socialist Alternative | 0 | | | 0 | 0 | 0.4 | 112 | +0.0% |

== Ward results ==
=== Bandley Hill ===
Location of Bandley Hill ward

Bandley Hill
| Party | Candidate | Votes | % | ±% |
|---|---|---|---|---|
| Labour | Jacqueline Hollywell | 1,174 | 52.2 | −13.8 |
| Conservative | Freda Warner | 650 | 28.9 | −5.1 |
| Liberal Democrats | Sean McManus | 425 | 18.9 | +18.9 |
| Majority | | 524 | 23.3 | −8.7 |
| Turnout | | 2,249 | 47.0 | |

=== Bedwell ===
Location of Bedwell ward

Bedwell
| Party | Candidate | Votes | % | ±% |
|---|---|---|---|---|
| Labour | Elizabeth Harrington | 1,398 | 59.5 | −4.7 |
| Conservative | Galina Dimelow | 440 | 18.7 | +0.9 |
| Liberal Democrats | John Meacham | 399 | 17.0 | +3.6 |
| Socialist Alternative | Stephen Glennon | 112 | 4.8 | +0.2 |
| Majority | | 958 | 40.8 | −5.6 |
| Turnout | | 2,349 | 50.3 | |

=== Chells ===
Location of Chells ward

Chells
| Party | Candidate | Votes | % | ±% |
|---|---|---|---|---|
| Labour | Kenneth Vale | 1,307 | 51.9 | −0.7 |
| Liberal Democrats | Leonard Lambert | 822 | 32.7 | +3.2 |
| Conservative | Ralph Dimelow | 387 | 15.4 | −2.6 |
| Majority | | 485 | 19.2 | −3.9 |
| Turnout | | 2,516 | 55.6 | |

=== Longmeadow ===
Location of Longmeadow ward

Longmeadow
| Party | Candidate | Votes | % | ±% |
|---|---|---|---|---|
| Labour | Patricia Webb | 1,072 | 46.6 | −2.8 |
| Conservative | Matthew Hurst | 646 | 28.1 | +3.3 |
| Liberal Democrats | Ralph Baskerville | 582 | 25.3 | +6.6 |
| Majority | | 426 | 18.5 | −6.1 |
| Turnout | | 2,300 | 51.8 | |

=== Manor ===
Location of Manor ward

Manor
| Party | Candidate | Votes | % | ±% |
|---|---|---|---|---|
| Liberal Democrats | Robin Parker | 1,859 | 66.3 | +12.3 |
| Labour | Gordana Bjelic-Rados | 472 | 16.8 | −9.1 |
| Conservative | Dilys Clark | 472 | 16.8 | −3.3 |
| Majority | | 1,387 | 49.5 | +21.4 |
| Turnout | | 2,803 | 58.0 | |

=== Martins Wood ===
Location of Martins Wood ward

Martins Wood
| Party | Candidate | Votes | % | ±% |
|---|---|---|---|---|
| Labour | Michael Patston | 958 | 42.8 | −7.8 |
| Conservative | Matthew Wyatt | 664 | 29.6 | +1.8 |
| Liberal Democrats | Barbara Segadelli | 404 | 18.0 | +3.3 |
| Green | Ian Murrill | 214 | 9.6 | +2.6 |
| Majority | | 294 | 13.2 | −9.6 |
| Turnout | | 2,240 | 49.0 | |

=== Old Town ===
Location of Old Town ward

Old Town
| Party | Candidate | Votes | % | ±% |
|---|---|---|---|---|
| Labour | Michael Downing | 1,256 | 46.4 | −4.3 |
| Conservative | Jody Hanafin | 749 | 27.7 | −1.3 |
| Liberal Democrats | Jennifer Moorcroft | 484 | 17.9 | +4.3 |
| Green | Bernard Chapman | 217 | 8.0 | +1.3 |
| Majority | | 507 | 18.7 | −3.0 |
| Turnout | | 2,706 | 57.3 | |

=== Pin Green ===
Location of Pin Green ward

Pin Green
| Party | Candidate | Votes | % | ±% |
|---|---|---|---|---|
| Labour | Reginald Smith | 1,237 | 54.0 | −5.3 |
| Conservative | Mollie Cawthorn | 564 | 24.6 | +1.0 |
| Liberal Democrats | Mary Griffith | 488 | 21.3 | +4.2 |
| Majority | | 673 | 29.4 | −6.3 |
| Turnout | | 2,289 | 52.2 | |

=== Roebuck ===
Location of Roebuck ward

Roebuck
| Party | Candidate | Votes | % | ±% |
|---|---|---|---|---|
| Labour | John Gardner | 1,094 | 49.7 | −4.2 |
| Conservative | Anita Speight | 563 | 25.6 | −0.2 |
| Liberal Democrats | Gordon Knight | 544 | 24.7 | +4.5 |
| Majority | | 431 | 24.1 | −4.0 |
| Turnout | | 2,201 | 49.0 | |

=== St Nicholas ===
Location of St Nicholas ward

St Nicholas
| Party | Candidate | Votes | % | ±% |
|---|---|---|---|---|
| Labour | John Raynor | 989 | 48.5 | −5.8 |
| Liberal Democrats | Heather Snell | 540 | 26.5 | +3.8 |
| Conservative | Claire Halling | 512 | 25.1 | +2.1 |
| Majority | | 449 | 22.0 | −9.3 |
| Turnout | | 2,041 | 47.0 | |

=== Shephall ===
Location of Shephall ward

Shephall
| Party | Candidate | Votes | % | ±% |
|---|---|---|---|---|
| Labour | Brian Hall | 1,389 | 61.2 | −2.0 |
| Liberal Democrats | Nicholas Baskerville | 441 | 19.4 | +1.6 |
| Conservative | Leslie Clark | 440 | 19.4 | +0.4 |
| Majority | | 948 | 41.8 | −2.4 |
| Turnout | | 2,270 | 51.7 | |

=== Symonds Green ===
Location of Symonds Green ward

Symonds Green
| Party | Candidate | Votes | % | ±% |
|---|---|---|---|---|
| Labour | Patrick Kissane | 1,436 | 60.5 | −4.1 |
| Conservative | Louisa Notley | 582 | 24.5 | −10.9 |
| Liberal Democrats | Katherine Lloyd | 354 | 14.9 | +14.9 |
| Majority | | 854 | 36.0 | +6.8 |
| Turnout | | 2,372 | 53.7 | |

=== Woodfield ===
Location of Woodfield ward

Woodfield
| Party | Candidate | Votes | % | ±% |
|---|---|---|---|---|
| Conservative | Graham Clark | 990 | 46.2 | +1.0 |
| Labour | John Lloyd | 760 | 35.5 | −3.4 |
| Liberal Democrats | Audrey Griffith | 391 | 18.3 | +2.4 |
| Majority | | 230 | 10.7 | +4.4 |
| Turnout | | 2,141 | 56.3 | |
