= 2000 Stevenage Borough Council election =

2000 UK local government election

← 1999	4 May 2000	2002 →

15 of the 39 seats to Stevenage Borough Council 20 seats needed for a majority
- Turnout: 28.1%
	First party	Second party	Third party
Party	Labour	Conservative	Liberal Democrats
Seats before	33	3	3
Seats won	13	1	1
Seats after	33	3	3
Seat change	Steady	Steady	Steady
Percentage	49.7%	28.8%	20.4%
- Map showing the results of contested wards in the 2000 Stevenage Borough Council elections.
Council control before election
Labour
Council control after election
Labour

Elections to Stevenage Council in Hertfordshire, England were held on 4 May 2000. One third of the council was up for election; the seats of the candidates who finished third in each ward in the all-out election of 1999. The Labour Party stayed in overall control of the council, which it had held continuously since its creation in 1973.

After the election, the composition of the council was:

- Labour 33
- Liberal Democrat 3
- Conservative 3

== Election result ==
Stevenage local election result 2000
Party	Seats	Gains	Losses	Net gain/loss	Seats %	Votes %	Votes	+/−
Labour	13			0	86.7			
Liberal Democrats	1			0	6.7			
Conservative	1			0	6.7			

== Ward results ==
=== Bandley Hill ===
Location of Bandley Hill ward

Bandley Hill
Party	Candidate	Votes	%
Labour	Lilian Strange	631	61.7
Conservative	F. Warner	244	23.9
Liberal Democrats	M. Latham	144	11.2
Socialist Alternative	M. Pickersgill	33	3.2
Majority			37.8
Turnout			20.7

=== Bedwell ===
Location of Bedwell ward

Bedwell
Party	Candidate	Votes	%
Labour	David Cullen	1,122	63.0
Conservative	M. Wyatt	376	21.1
Liberal Democrats	G. Robbins	282	15.8
Majority			41.9
Turnout			38.1

=== Chells ===
Location of Chells ward

Chells
Party	Candidate	Votes	%
Labour	Jeannette Thomas	572	43.5
Liberal Democrats	Mary Griffith	572	43.5
Conservative	W. Clark	172	13.1
Majority		0	0.0
Turnout			28.3

=== Longmeadow ===
Location of Longmeadow ward

Longmeadow
Party	Candidate	Votes	%
Labour	Bruce Jackson	541	48.3
Conservative	V. Ovenden	376	33.6
Liberal Democrats	D. Wilkins	156	13.9
Green	Hoyes W.	46	4.1
Majority			14.7
Turnout			24.9

=== Manor ===
Location of Manor ward

Manor
Party	Candidate	Votes	%
Liberal Democrats	Graham Snell	875	60.4
Labour	F. Price	325	22.4
Conservative	S. Smith	249	17.2
Majority			38.0
Turnout			30.8

=== Martins Wood ===
Location of Martins Wood ward

Martins Wood
Party	Candidate	Votes	%
Labour	David Royall	514	48.3
Conservative	M. Hurst	340	32.0
Liberal Democrats	L. Lambert	129	12.1
Green	I. Murrill	81	7.6
Majority		174	16.3
Turnout			22.7

=== Old Town ===
Location of Old Town ward

Old Town
Party	Candidate	Votes	%
Labour	Hugh Tessier	1,035	45.4
Conservative	S. Greaves	966	42.3
Liberal Democrats	Jennifer Moorcroft	280	12.3
Majority		69	3.1
Turnout			49.2

=== Pin Green ===
Location of Pin Green ward

Pin Green
Party	Candidate	Votes	%
Labour	Simon Speller	644	59.5
Conservative	L. Notley	302	27.9
Liberal Democrats	H. Snell	137	12.7
Majority			31.6
Turnout			23.6

=== Roebuck ===
Location of Roebuck ward

Roebuck
Party	Candidate	Votes	%
Labour	Brian Dunnell	541	48.8
Conservative	P. Wilkins	319	28.8
Liberal Democrats	J. Bellars	249	22.5
Majority			20.0
Turnout			24.0

=== St Nicholas ===
Location of St Nicholas ward

St Nicholas
Party	Candidate	Votes	%
Labour	Richard Henry	524	
Labour	C. Latif	514	
Conservative	L. Clark	308	
Conservative	S. Woods	295	
Liberal Democrats	K. Lloyd	184	
Majority			21.3
Turnout			21.2

=== Shephall ===
Location of Shephall ward

Shephall
Party	Candidate	Votes	%
Labour	David Webb	818	
Labour	Brian Hall	780	
Conservative	V. Greaves	192	
Conservative	S. Kerby	180	
Liberal Democrats	Nicholas Baskerville	153	
Liberal Democrats	G. Knight	152	
Green	T. Figg	28	
Majority			52.6
Turnout			26.3

=== Symonds Green ===
Location of Symonds Green ward

Symonds Green
Party	Candidate	Votes	%
Labour	Tony Turner	624	54.5
Conservative	D. Clark	415	36.3
Liberal Democrats	S. Grubert	105	9.2
Majority		209	18.2
Turnout			24.9

=== Woodfield ===
Location of Woodfield ward

Woodfield
Party	Candidate	Votes	%
Conservative	Margaret Notley	591	58.2
Labour	A. Ismail	354	34.9
Liberal Democrats	E. Sturges	70	6.9
Majority		237	23.3
Turnout			31.2
