= 2015 Stevenage Borough Council election =

2015 UK local government election

← 2014	7 May 2015	2016 →

13 of the 39 seats to Stevenage Borough Council 20 seats needed for a majority
	First party	Second party	Third party
Party	Labour	Conservative	Liberal Democrats
Seats before	33	3	3
Seats won	8	1	1
Seats after	30	6	3
Seat change	▼3	▲3	Steady
Popular vote	15,815	14,923	3,082
Percentage	38.2%	36.0%	7.4%
- Map showing the results of contested wards in the 2015 Stevenage Borough Council elections. Labour in red, Conservatives in blue and Liberal Democrats in yellow.
Council control before election
Labour
Council control after election
Labour

The by-thirds 2015 Stevenage Borough Council election was held on 7 May 2015 to elect one third (thirteen) of the members (councillors) of the council, one for each ward, as part of the 2015 United Kingdom local elections held simultaneously with the 2015 General Election. The up for election were last contested in 2011. The Labour Party retained control of the council, which it had held continuously since 1973.

== Results summary ==
In the previous result the changes were that Labour party candidates gained two Conservative-held seats and a Liberal Democrat took a Labour councillor-held seat. As shown in the 2012 table this meant the total of councillors stood as 31, 4 and 4 for these party groups, the governing group being that of Labour councillors. This election saw three seats in that group convert to the now largest formal opposition group of councillors, local Conservatives.

Stevenage Borough Council election, 2015
Party	Seats				Popular vote	
Party	Won	Not up	Total	±	Votes	%
Labour	8	22	30	−3	15,815	39
Conservative	4	2	6	+3	14,923	36
Liberal Democrats	1	2	3	0	3,082	8
TUSC	0	0	0	0	566	1
Green	0	0	0	0	2,225	5
UKIP	0	0	0	0	4,297	11
Total	13	26	39	–	40,908	–
Turnout						71.4

== Ward by ward ==
=== Bandley Hill ===
Location of Bandley Hill ward

Bandley Hill
Party	Candidate	Votes	%	±%
Conservative	Sharon Hearn	1,496	46.3	
Labour Co-op	Jacqueline Ann Hollywell	1,267	39.2	
Green	James Brett Howarth	188	5.8	
Liberal Democrats	Barbara Segadelli	161	5.0	
TUSC	Amanda Gloria Dilley	117	3.6	
Majority		229	7.1	
Turnout		3,229	62.3	
Conservative gain from Labour		Swing		

=== Bedwell ===
Location of Bedwell ward

Bedwell
Party	Candidate	Votes	%	±%
Labour Co-op	Elizabeth Harrington	1,530	49.3	
Conservative	Ashik Miah	687	22.1	
UKIP	Dale Long	605	19.3	
Green	Victoria Louise Snelling	136	4.4	
Liberal Democrats	Gareth Steiner	117	3.8	
TUSC	Steven William Glennon	31	1.0	
Majority		843	27.2	
Turnout		3,106	58.4	
Labour hold		Swing		

=== Chells ===
Location of Chells ward

Chells
Party	Candidate	Votes	%	±%
Labour Co-op	Howard John Burrell	1,307		
Conservative	Matthew Paul Wyatt	1,186		
Liberal Democrats	Andrew David Anderson	427		
Green	Laura Kate Hamilton	215		
TUSC	Roger Alexander Charles	100		
Majority		121		
Turnout			61.3	
Labour hold		Swing		

=== Longmeadow ===
Location of Longmeadow ward

Longmeadow
Party	Candidate	Votes	%	±%
Conservative	Matthew Hurst	1,283		
Labour	Monika Cherney-Craw	1,046		
UKIP	Mark Williams	549		
Green	Martin Malocco	179		
TUSC	Helen Kerr	21		
Majority		237		
Turnout			66.8	
Conservative gain from Labour		Swing		

=== Manor ===
Location of Manor ward

Manor
Party	Candidate	Votes	%	±%
Liberal Democrats	Robin Parker	1,413		
Conservative	Matthew Clarke	996		
Labour	Ryan McQueen	722		
UKIP	Peter Yarnold-Forrester	455		
Green	Marcus Blackburn	101		
Majority		417		
Turnout			71.9	
Liberal Democrats hold		Swing		

=== Martins Wood ===
Location of Martins Wood ward

Martins Wood
Party	Candidate	Votes	%	±%
Labour Co-op	Sarah Mead	1,246		
Conservative	Michael Hearn	1,239		
Liberal Democrats	Patricia Washer	188		
Green	Steve Welch	179		
TUSC	Mark Gentleman	88		
Majority		7		
Turnout				
Labour hold		Swing		

=== Old Town ===
Location of Old Town ward

Old Town
Party	Candidate	Votes	%	±%
Conservative	James Fraser	1,719		
Labour Co-op	Hugh Tessier	1,468		
UKIP	Marilyn Yarnold-Forrester	518		
Green	Elizabeth Sturges	242		
Liberal Democrats	Matthew Snell	183		
TUSC	Mark Pickersgill	32		
Majority		251		
Turnout				
Conservative gain from Labour		Swing		

=== Pin Green ===
Location of Pin Green ward

Pin Green
Party	Candidate	Votes	%	±%
Labour Co-op	Jeannette Thomas	1,268		
Conservative	Michelle Frith	973		
UKIP	Patricia Jones	548		
Green	Vicky Lovelace	194		
TUSC	Rhian Clare	31		
Majority		295		
Turnout				
Labour hold		Swing		

=== Roebuck ===
Location of Roebuck ward

Roebuck
Party	Candidate	Votes	%	±%
Labour Co-op	John Gardner	1,152		
Conservative	Adam Mitchell	1,104		
UKIP	Vicky Gabriel	614		
Green	Graham White	154		
Liberal Democrats	Debra Brown	123		
TUSC	Bryan Clare	18		
Majority		48		
Turnout				
Labour hold		Swing		

=== St Nicholas ===
Location of St Nicholas ward

St Nicholas
Party	Candidate	Votes	%	±%
Labour Co-op	John Raynor	1,373		
Conservative	Alexander Farquharson	960		
UKIP	Jessica Worden	554		
Liberal Democrats	Heather Snell	182		
Green	Darren Stocker	141		
TUSC	Amber Gentleman	29		
Majority		413		
Turnout				
Labour hold		Swing		

=== Shephall ===
Location of Shephall ward

Shephall
Party	Candidate	Votes	%	±%
Labour Co-op	Ann Webb	1,284		
Conservative	Paul Mould	730		
UKIP	Roy Worden	582		
Green	Michael Malocco	148		
TUSC	Barbara Clare	42		
Majority		554		
Turnout				
Labour hold		Swing		

=== Symonds Green ===
Location of Symonds Green ward

Symonds Green
Party	Candidate	Votes	%	±%
Labour	Michael Downing	1,341	45.6	
Conservative	Philip Roethenbaugh	1,183	40.3	
Green	Richard Warr	199	6.8	
Liberal Democrats	Clive Hearmon	158	5.4	
TUSC	Trevor Palmer	57	1.9	
Majority		158	5.3	
Turnout		2,938	63.8	
Labour hold		Swing		

=== Woodfield ===
Location of Woodfield ward

Woodfield
Party	Candidate	Votes	%	±%
Conservative	Graham Lawrence	1,367		
Labour	Jim Callaghan	811		
UKIP	Brian Lewis	390		
Green	Sophie MacNeill	149		
Liberal Democrats	Daniel Snell	130		
Majority		556		
Turnout				
Conservative hold		Swing		
