= 2012 Stevenage Borough Council election =

2012 UK local government election

← 2011	3 May 2012	2014 →

13 of the 39 seats to Stevenage Borough Council 20 seats needed for a majority
	First party	Second party	Third party
Party	Labour	Conservative	Liberal Democrats
Seats before	27	9	3
Seats won	11	1	1
Seats after	30	6	3
Seat change	▲3	▼3	Steady
Popular vote	10,498	5,740	2,309
Percentage	52.6%	28.8%	11.6%
- Map showing the results of contested wards in the 2012 Stevenage Borough Council elections. Labour in red, Conservatives in blue and Liberal Democrats in yellow.
Council control before election
Labour
Council control after election
Labour

Elections to Stevenage Borough Council were held on 3 May 2012. One third of the council were elected; the seats which were last contested in 2008.

The composition of the council after the election was:

- Labour 30
- Conservative 6
- Liberal Democrat 3

== Election result ==
Stevenage local election result 2012
Party	Seats	Gains	Losses	Net gain/loss	Seats %	Votes %	Votes	+/−
Labour	11	3	0	+3	84.6	52.6	10,498	+5.8
Conservative	1	0	3	-3	7.7	28.8	5,740	-2.4
Liberal Democrats	1	0	0	±0	7.7	11.6	2,309	+1.3
UKIP	0	0	0	±0	0.0	2.9	587	-7.1
TUSC	0	0	0	±0	0.0	2.2	438	+1.0
Green	0	0	0	±0	0.0	1.9	377	+1.5

== Ward results ==
=== Bandley Hill ===
Location of Bandley Hill ward

Bandley Hill
Party	Candidate	Votes	%	±%
Labour	Michelle Gardner	814	53.8	+6.5
Conservative	Sharon Hearn	492	32.5	−0.5
Liberal Democrats	Barbara Segadelli	105	6.9	+0.8
TUSC	Amanda Dilley	101	6.7	+3.6
Majority		322	21.3	+7.0
Turnout		1512	30.7	−9.2
Labour hold		Swing		

=== Bedwell ===
Location of Bedwell ward

Bedwell
Party	Candidate	Votes	%	±%
Labour	David Cullen	897	56.8	+0.1
Conservative	Ellin Joseph	258	16.3	−5.3
UKIP	Sean Howlett	218	13.8	+0.6
Green	Ian Cropton	88	5.6	−0.2
Liberal Democrats	Debra Betts	78	4.9	+4.9
TUSC	Steve Glennon	39	2.5	−0.2
Majority		639	40.5	+5.4
Turnout		1578	31.1	−8.7
Labour hold		Swing		

=== Chells ===
Location of Chells ward

Chells
Party	Candidate	Votes	%	±%
Labour	Vickie Warwick	875	56.2	+8.2
Conservative	Matthew Wyatt	382	24.5	−0.6
Liberal Democrats	Gareth Steiner	201	12.9	−1.6
TUSC	Mark Pickersgill	100	6.4	+6.4
Majority		493	31.6	+8.8
Turnout		1558	31.1	−10.8
Labour hold		Swing		

=== Longmeadow ===
Location of Longmeadow ward

Longmeadow
Party	Candidate	Votes	%	±%
Labour	Lorraine Bell	778	47.0	+5.1
Conservative	Matthew Hurst	596	36.0	−0.3
Liberal Democrats	Ralph Baskerville	172	10.4	+0.6
TUSC	Helen Kerr	109	6.6	+3.5
Majority		182	11.0	+5.4
Turnout		1655	36.4	−8.1
Labour gain from Conservative		Swing		

=== Manor ===
Location of Manor ward

Manor
Party	Candidate	Votes	%	±%
Liberal Democrats	Graham Snell	837	45.6	+4.3
Labour	Amanda King	566	30.8	+4.9
Conservative	Susan Smith	432	23.5	−2.2
Majority		271	14.8	−0.6
Turnout		1835	36.6	−11.0
Liberal Democrats hold		Swing		

=== Martins Wood ===
Location of Martins Wood ward

Martins Wood
Party	Candidate	Votes	%	±%
Labour	Maureen McKay	835	60.1	+12.2
Conservative	Dilys Clark	425	30.6	−5.0
Liberal Democrats	Kevin Aylward	130	9.4	+2.6
Majority		410	29.5	+17.2
Turnout		1390	29.7	−12.1
Labour gain from Conservative		Swing		

=== Old Town ===
Location of Old Town ward

Old Town
Party	Candidate	Votes	%	±%
Labour	Jim Brown	1,020	49.5	+1.8
Conservative	James Fraser	783	38.0	+1.0
Green	Elizabeth Sturges	159	7.7	+7.7
Liberal Democrats	Matthew Snell	99	4.8	−2.9
Majority		237	11.5	+0.8
Turnout		2061	33.8	−9.3
Labour gain from Conservative		Swing		

=== Pin Green ===
Location of Pin Green ward

Pin Green
Party	Candidate	Votes	%	±%
Labour	Simon Speller	861	58.1	+7.3
Conservative	Bill Whelan	336	22.7	−9.2
UKIP	Michael Kumar	188	12.7	+2.1
Liberal Democrats	Amanda Piroth	97	6.5	−0.2
Majority		525	35.4	+16.4
Turnout		1482	31.9	−9.3
Labour hold		Swing		

=== Roebuck ===
Location of Roebuck ward

Roebuck
Party	Candidate	Votes	%	±%
Labour	John Lloyd	758	52.8	+3.9
Conservative	Adam Mitchell	424	29.5	−3.6
Green	Graham White	130	9.1	+9.1
Liberal Democrats	Denise Baskerville	83	5.8	+5.8
TUSC	Bryan Clare	41	2.9	−0.4
Majority		334	23.2	+7.3
Turnout		1436	30.3	−9.8
Labour hold		Swing		

=== St Nicholas ===
Location of St Nicholas ward

Location of Shephall ward

St Nicholas
Party	Candidate	Votes	%	±%
Labour	Richard Henry	860	62.6	+9.8
Conservative	Gillian Mould	352	25.6	−2.0
Liberal Democrats	Heather Snell	162	11.8	+1.8
Majority		508	37.0	+11.8
Turnout		1374	28.9	−11.9
Labour hold		Swing		

=== Shephall ===
Location of Shephall ward

Shephall
Party	Candidate	Votes	%	±%
Labour	Jack Pickersgill	760	58.7	+4.3
Conservative	Michelle Calcutt	215	16.6	−5.8
UKIP	Andrea Taylor	181	14.0	+4.5
Liberal Democrats	Nicholas Baskerville	91	7.0	−2.1
TUSC	Barbara Clare	48	3.7	−0.9
Majority		545	42.1	+10.2
Turnout		1295	28.6	−8.4
Labour hold		Swing		

=== Symonds Green ===
Location of Symonds Green ward

Symonds Green
Party	Candidate	Votes	%	±%
Labour	Laurie Chester	953	63.2	+4.8
Conservative	Paul Mould	431	28.6	+0.5
Liberal Democrats	Clive Hearmon	123	8.2	+2.2
Majority		522	34.6	+4.3
Turnout		1507	33.6	−9.5
Labour hold		Swing		

=== Woodfield ===
Location of Woodfield ward

Woodfield
Party	Candidate	Votes	%	±%
Conservative	Margaret Notley	614	48.5	+0.5
Labour	Jim Callaghan	521	41.2	+8.5
Liberal Democrats	Katherine Lloyd-Manning	131	10.3	+1.4
Majority		93	7.3	−2.3
Turnout		1266	30.3	−12.2
Conservative hold		Swing		
