= 2016 Stevenage Borough Council election =

2016 UK local government election

← 2015	5 May 2016	2018 →

13 of the 39 seats to Stevenage Borough Council 20 seats needed for a majority
- Turnout: 34.65%
	First party	Second party	Third party
Party	Labour	Conservative	Liberal Democrats
Seats before	30	6	3
Seats won	10	2	1
Seats after	29	7	3
Seat change	▼1	▲1	Steady
Popular vote	9,155	6,776	2,706
Percentage	42.6%	31.5%	12.6%
- Map showing the results of contested wards in the 2016 Stevenage Borough Council elections. Labour in red, Conservatives in blue and Liberal Democrats in yellow.
Council control before election
Labour
Council control after election
Labour

The 2016 Stevenage Borough Council election took place on 5 May 2016 to elect members of Stevenage Borough Council in England. This was on the same day as other local elections. One third of the council was up for election; the seats which were last contested in 2012. The Labour Party retained control of the council, which it had held continuously since 1973.

== Results summary ==
Stevenage Borough Council election, 2016
Party	Seats				Popular vote		
Party	Won	Not up	Total	±	Votes	%	±
Labour	10	19	29	−1	9,155	42.6	
Conservative	2	5	7	+1	6,776	31.5	
Liberal Democrats	1	2	3	0	2,706	12.6	
Green	0	0	0	0	1,081	5.0	
UKIP	0	0	0	0	1,038	4.8	
TUSC	0	0	0	0	707	3.3	
Give Me Back Elmo	0	0	0	0	23	0.1	
Total	13	26	39	–	21,486	–	–
Turnout						34.65	

== Ward results ==
=== Bandley Hill ===
Location of Bandley Hill ward

Bandley Hill
Party	Candidate	Votes	%
Labour	Michelle Gardner	783	
Conservative	Alexander Farquharson	603	
Liberal Democrats	Barbara Segadelli	98	
TUSC	Mark Pickersgill	96	
Majority			
Turnout			32.11%
Labour hold			

=== Bedwell ===
Location of Bedwell ward

Bedwell
Party	Candidate	Votes	%
Labour	David Cullen	917	
Conservative	David William Bundy	415	
Green	Victoria Louise Snelling	147	
Liberal Democrats	Gareth Steiner	95	
TUSC	Steve Glennon	68	
Majority			
Turnout			33.15%
Labour hold			

=== Chells ===
Location of Chells ward

Chells
Party	Candidate	Votes	%
Labour	Jackie Hollywell	619	
Conservative	Matthew Wyatt	437	
Liberal Democrats	Stephen Booth	515	
TUSC	Roger Alexander Charles	67	
Green	Shirley Anne Hicks	61	
Give Me Back Elmo	Bobby Smith	23	
Majority			
Turnout			34.66%
Labour hold			

=== Longmeadow ===
Location of Longmeadow ward

Longmeadow
Party	Candidate	Votes	%
Conservative	Adam Joseph Stephen Mitchell	638	
Labour	Lorraine Kathleen Bell	631	
Liberal Democrats	Ralph Baskerville	131	
Green	Alex Tasker	98	
TUSC	Helen Dorothy Kerr	65	
Majority			
Turnout			35.78%
Conservative gain from Labour		Swing	

=== Manor ===
Location of Manor ward

Manor
Party	Candidate	Votes	%
Liberal Democrats	Graham Snell	1,224	
Conservative	Matthew Clarke	414	
Labour	Monika Elizabeth Cherney-Craw	352	
Green	Marcus Michael Grant Blackburn	83	
Majority			
Turnout			42.2%
Liberal Democrats hold			

=== Martins Wood ===
Location of Martins Wood ward

Martins Wood
Party	Candidate	Votes	%
Labour	Maureen McKay	717	
Conservative	Michael Steven Hearn	534	
Green	Naomi Ruth Collins	89	
Liberal Democrats	Andrew David Anderson	79	
TUSC	Mark Nathan Simon Gentleman	56	
Majority			
Turnout			32.56%
Labour hold			

=== Old Town ===
Location of Old Town ward

Old Town
Party	Candidate	Votes	%
Labour	Jim Brown	974	
Conservative	Philip Kenneth Roethenbaugh	749	
Green	Elizabeth Sturges	143	
Liberal Democrats	Matthew Snell	97	
Majority			
Turnout			37.66%
Labour hold			

=== Pin Green ===
Location of Pin Green ward

Pin Green
Party	Candidate	Votes	%
Labour	Simon Speller	762	
Conservative	Michelle Mary Frith	477	
Green	Vicky Lovelace	130	
Liberal Democrats	Patricia Washer	99	
TUSC	Ella Milner	58	
Majority			
Turnout			33.16%
Labour hold			

=== Roebuck ===
Location of Roebuck ward

Roebuck
Party	Candidate	Votes	%
Labour	John Lloyd	714	
Conservative	Bret Ray Facey	471	
UKIP	Mark Peter Williams	282	
Green	Martin John Malocco	86	
Liberal Democrats	Denise Baskerville	77	
TUSC	Bryan Clare	16	
Majority			
Turnout			34.05%
Labour hold			

=== St Nicholas ===
Location of St Nicholas ward

St Nicholas
Party	Candidate	Votes	%
Labour	Richard Henry	858	
Conservative	Kevin Orral	540	
Liberal Democrats	Heather Snell	148	
Majority			
Turnout			33.35%
Labour hold			

=== Shephall ===
Location of Shephall ward

Shephall
Party	Candidate	Votes	%
Labour	John Philip Mead	708	
Conservative	Ian Frith	381	
Green	Michael Andrew Malocco	133	
TUSC	Barbara Clare	111	
Majority			
Turnout			29.57%
Labour hold			

=== Symonds Green ===
Location of Symonds Green ward

Symonds Green
Party	Candidate	Votes	%
Labour	Laurie Chester	733	
Conservative	Alex Young	457	
UKIP	Sean Ulick Howlett	252	
Liberal Democrats	Clive Hearmon	69	
Green	Richard David Warr	57	
TUSC	Trevor Michael Palmer	16	
Majority			
Turnout			36.35%
Labour hold			

=== Woodfield ===
Location of Woodfield ward

Woodfield
Party	Candidate	Votes	%
Conservative	Margaret Notley	660	
Labour	Jim Callaghan	441	
Liberal Democrats	Daniel Peter Charles Snell	74	
Majority			
Turnout			34.9%
Conservative hold			
