= 2014 Stevenage Borough Council election =

2014 UK local government election

← 2012	22 May 2014	2015 →

14 of the 39 seats to Stevenage Borough Council 20 seats needed for a majority
	First party	Second party	Third party
Party	Labour	Conservative	Liberal Democrats
Seats before	30	6	3
Seats won	12	1	1
Seats after	33	3	3
Seat change	▲3	▼3	Steady
Popular vote	9,325	5,950	5,314
Percentage	39.4%	25.1%	22.4%
- Map showing the results of contested wards in the 2014 Stevenage Borough Council elections. Labour in red, Conservatives in blue and Liberal Democrats in yellow.
Council control before election
Labour
Council control after election
Labour

The 2014 Stevenage Borough Council election took place on 22 May 2014 to elect members of Stevenage Borough Council in England. This was on the same day as other local elections; the seats which were last contested in 2010. The Labour Party retained control of the council, which it had held continuously since 1973.

== Ward results ==
=== Bandley Hill ===
Location of Bandley Hill ward

Bandley Hill
Party	Candidate	Votes	%
Labour	Joan Lloyd	844	49.3%
Conservative	Sharon Hearn	602	23.2%
TUSC	Amanda Dilley	162	9.4%
Liberal Democrats	Barbara Segadelli	124	6.8%
Majority		242	26.1%
Turnout		1,732	
Labour hold			

=== Bedwell ===
Location of Bedwell ward

Bedwell
Party	Candidate	Votes	%
Labour	Elaine Connolly	901	49.2%
UKIP	Sheila Hamilton	514	28.0%
Conservative	Michelle Calcutt	301	16.4%
Liberal Democrats	Gareth Steiner	80	4.4%
TUSC	Steve Glennon	37	2.0%
Majority		387	21.2%
Turnout		1,833	
Labour hold			

=== Chells ===
Location of Chells ward

Chells
Party	Candidate	Votes	%
Labour	Pam Stuart	637	34.5%
UKIP	Julie Seddon	485	26.3%
Liberal Democrats	Andrew Anderson	429	23.3%
Conservative	Matthew Wyatt	294	15.9%
Majority		152	8.2%
Turnout		1,845	
Labour hold			

=== Longmeadow ===
Location of Longmeadow ward

Longmeadow
Party	Candidate	Votes	%
Labour	Douglas Bainbridge	637	34.5%
Conservative	Matthew Hurst	534	26.3%
UKIP	Mark Williams	522	23.3%
Liberal Democrats	Ralph Baskerville	122	15.9%
Majority		103	8.2%
Turnout		1,854	
Labour gain from Conservative			

=== Manor ===
Location of Manor ward

Manor
Party	Candidate	Votes	%
Liberal Democrats	Andy McGuinness	972	34.5%
UKIP	Colleen Blyth	419	26.3%
Labour	Keelan Henry	401	23.3%
Conservative	Craig Heath	349	15.9%
TUSC	Helen Kerr	39	2.0%
Majority		553	8.2%
Turnout		2,180	
Liberal Democrats hold			

=== Martins Wood ===
Location of Martins Wood ward

Martins Wood
Party	Candidate	Votes	%
Labour	Lloyd Briscoe	724	34.5%
UKIP	Billy Hamilton	478	26.3%
Conservative	Michael Hearn	459	23.3%
Majority		246	8.2%
Turnout		1,661	
Labour gain from Conservative			

=== Old Town ===
Location of Old Town ward

Old Town
Party	Candidate	Votes	%
Labour	Christopher Saunders	888	34.5%
Conservative	Jamie Fraser	703	26.3%
UKIP	Marilyn Yarnold-Forrester	553	23.3%
Green	Elizabeth Sturges	158	15.9%
Liberal Democrats	Matthew Snell	80	2.0%
Majority		185	8.2%
Turnout		2,382	
Labour gain from Conservative			

=== Pin Green ===
Location of Pin Green ward

Pin Green
Party	Candidate	Votes	%
Labour	Lin Martin-Haugh	809	34.5%
UKIP	Liam Rafferty	491	26.3%
Conservative	Paul Mould	387	23.3%
TUSC	Rhian Clare	51	15.9%
Majority		318	8.2%
Turnout		1,738	
Labour hold			

=== Roebuck ===
Location of Roebuck ward

Roebuck
Party	Candidate	Votes	%
Labour	Sherma Batson	647	34.5%
UKIP	Victoria Gabriel	511	26.3%
Conservative	Adam Mitchell	435	23.3%
Green	Graham White	86	15.9%
Liberal Democrats	Denise Baskerville	73	2.0%
TUSC	Bryan Clare	13	0.7%
Majority		136	8.2%
Turnout		1,765	
Labour hold			

=== St Nicholas ===
Location of St Nicholas ward

St Nicholas
Party	Candidate	Votes	%
Labour	Carol Latif	756	34.5%
UKIP	Ken Neal	459	26.3%
Conservative	Kirsten McAuliffe	357	23.3%
Liberal Democrats	Heather Snell	105	15.9%
TUSC	Mark Gentleman	39	2.0%
Majority		297	8.2%
Turnout		1,716	
Labour hold			

=== Shephall (2 seats) ===
Location of Shephall ward

Shephall (2 seats)
Party	Candidate	Votes	%
Labour	Rob Broom	641	
Labour	John Mead	583	
UKIP	Roy Worden	503	
Conservative	Eamonn Walsh	282	
Conservative	Ashik Miah	228	
Liberal Democrats	Debra Betts	124	
TUSC	Barbara Clare	92	
TUSC	Mark Pickersgill	69	
Labour hold			
Labour hold			

=== Symonds Green ===
Location of Symonds Green ward

Symonds Green
Party	Candidate	Votes	%
Labour	Sharon Taylor	949	34.5%
Conservative	Philip Roethenbaugh	577	26.3%
Liberal Democrats	Clive Hearmon	121	23.3%
TUSC	Trevor Palmer	102	15.9%
Majority		372	8.2%
Turnout		1,749	
Labour hold			

=== Woodfield ===
Location of Woodfield ward

Woodfield
Party	Candidate	Votes	%
Conservative	Phil Bibby	670	34.5%
Labour	Jim Callaghan	491	26.3%
UKIP	Marion Mason	379	23.3%
Liberal Democrats	Katherine Lloyd-Manning	92	15.9%
Majority		179	8.2%
Turnout		1,632	
Conservative hold			
