= 2008 Stevenage Borough Council election =

2008 UK local government election

- 1 May 2008

13 of the 39 seats to Stevenage Borough Council 20 seats needed for a majority
	First party	Second party
Party	Labour	Conservative
Last election	32	3
Seats before	32	2^{†}
Seats won	8	4
Seats after	30	5
Seat change	▼2	▲3
Popular vote	8,361	7,382
Percentage	40.1%	35.4%
	Third party	Fourth party
Party	Liberal Democrats	UKIP
Last election	4	0
Seats before	4	1^{†}
Seats won	1	0
Seats after	3	1
Seat change	▼1	Steady
Popular vote	3,489	853
Percentage	16.8%	4.1%
- Map showing the results of contested wards in the 2008 Stevenage Borough Council elections.^{†}Councilor Marion Mason defected from Conservatives to UKIP in January 2008.
Council control before election
Labour
Council control after election
Labour

Elections to Stevenage Borough Council were held on 1 May 2008. One third of the council was up for election; the seats which were last contested in 2004. The Labour Party stayed in overall control of the council.

The election saw the Conservative Party gain 3 seats but the Labour Party remained firmly in control of the council.

After the election, the composition of the council was:

- Labour 30
- Conservative 5
- Liberal Democrat 3
- United Kingdom Independence Party 1

== Election results ==
Stevenage local election result 2008
Party	Seats	Gains	Losses	Net gain/loss	Seats %	Votes %	Votes	+/−
Labour	8	1	3	-2	61.5	40.1	8,361	-6.7
Conservative	4	3	0	+3	30.8	35.4	7,382	+5.2
Liberal Democrats	1	0	1	-1	7.7	16.8	3,489	-4.5
UKIP	0	0	0	0	0.0	4.1	853	+4.1
English Democrat	0	0	0	0	0.0	2.5	517	+2.5
Free England Party	0	0	0	0	0.0	0.8	158	+0.8
Green	0	0	0	0	0.0	0.3	67	-0.5

== Ward results ==
=== Bandley Hill ===
Location of Bandley Hill ward

Bandley Hill
Party	Candidate	Votes	%	±%
Labour	Lilian Strange	671	41.7	−10.1
Conservative	Anita Speight	486	30.2	−0.3
English Democrat	Carl Cooper	301	18.7	+18.7
Liberal Democrats	Gordon Knight	153	9.5	−8.2
Majority		185	11.5	−9.8
Turnout		1,611	33.9	+1.5
Labour hold		Swing		

=== Bedwell ===
Location of Bedwell ward

Bedwell
Party	Candidate	Votes	%	±%
Labour	David Cullen	788	52.6	−8.1
Conservative	Christine Saint-Leitner	467	31.2	+6.0
Liberal Democrats	Leonard Lambert	243	16.2	+2.1
Majority		321	21.4	−14.1
Turnout		1,498	32.0	−4.3
Labour hold		Swing		

=== Chells ===
Location of Chells ward

Chells
Party	Candidate	Votes	%	±%
Labour	Vickie Warwick	792	43.8	+1.9
Liberal Democrats	Gareth Steiner	540	29.8	−11.0
Conservative	Matthew Wyatt	478	26.4	+9.1
Majority		252	14.0	+12.9
Turnout		1,810	38.0	−1.6
Labour gain from Liberal Democrats		Swing		

=== Longmeadow ===
Location of Longmeadow ward

Longmeadow
Party	Candidate	Votes	%	±%
Conservative	Matthew Hurst	688	40.4	+1.2
Labour	Bruce Jackson	640	37.6	−4.2
Liberal Democrats	Ralph Baskerville	199	11.7	−7.3
UKIP	Julie Seddon	177	10.4	+10.4
Majority		48	2.8	
Turnout		1,704	39.5	+1.6
Conservative gain from Labour		Swing		

=== Manor ===
Location of Manor ward

Manor
Party	Candidate	Votes	%	±%
Liberal Democrats	Graham Snell	805	40.8	−13.6
Conservative	Susan Smith	609	30.9	+7.7
Labour	Joseph Sherry	458	23.2	+0.8
UKIP	Carol Knowles	101	5.1	+5.1
Majority		196	9.9	−21.3
Turnout		1,973	41.3	+0.0
Liberal Democrats hold		Swing		

=== Martins Wood ===
Location of Martins Wood ward

Martins Wood
Party	Candidate	Votes	%	±%
Conservative	Dilys Clark	611	37.6	−1.4
Labour	Janet Raynor	574	35.3	−8.3
English Democrat	John Cooper	216	13.3	+13.3
Liberal Democrats	Barbara Segadelli	116	7.1	−10.3
Green	Tom Moore	67	4.1	+4.1
UKIP	Andrew Elwell	40	2.5	+2.5
Majority		37	2.3	
Turnout		1,624	35.9	+1.6
Conservative gain from Labour		Swing		

=== Old Town ===
Location of Old Town ward

Old Town
Party	Candidate	Votes	%	±%
Conservative	James Fraser	886	42.1	+8.4
Labour	Hugh Tessier	860	40.9	−8.1
Liberal Democrats	Tennille Steiner	193	9.2	+0.1
UKIP	Rick Seddon	165	7.8	+7.8
Majority		26	1.2	
Turnout		2,104	41.2	−1.9
Conservative gain from Labour		Swing		

=== Pin Green ===
Location of Pin Green ward

Pin Green
Party	Candidate	Votes	%	±%
Labour	Simon Speller	649	47.6	−4.0
Conservative	Leslie Clark	402	29.5	+6.5
Free England Party	Richard Aitkins	158	11.6	+11.6
Liberal Democrats	Mary Griffith	155	11.4	−1.1
Majority		247	18.1	−10.5
Turnout		1,364	32.0	−5.3
Labour hold		Swing		

=== Roebuck ===
Location of Roebuck ward

Roebuck
Party	Candidate	Votes	%	±%
Labour	John Lloyd	578	39.7	−12.5
Conservative	Roger Gill	482	33.1	+2.4
UKIP	Vicky Peebles	229	15.7	+15.7
Liberal Democrats	Denise Baskerville	168	11.5	−5.5
Majority		96	6.6	−14.9
Turnout		1,457	32.9	−1.8
Labour hold		Swing		

=== St Nicholas ===
Location of St Nicholas ward

St Nicholas
Party	Candidate	Votes	%	±%
Labour	Richard Henry	605	44.5	−6.3
Conservative	Gillian Mould	460	33.8	+6.5
Liberal Democrats	Heather Snell	295	21.7	−0.2
Majority		145	10.7	−12.8
Turnout		1,360	31.6	−2.2
Labour hold		Swing		

=== Shephall ===
Location of Shephall ward

Shephall
Party	Candidate	Votes	%	±%
Labour	Jack Pickersgill	646	47.4	−8.9
Conservative	Ralph Dimelow	355	26.0	+1.7
Liberal Democrats	Nicholas Baskerville	221	16.2	−3.2
UKIP	Bob Layson	141	10.3	+10.3
Majority		291	21.4	−10.6
Turnout		1,363	31.3	−1.3
Labour hold		Swing		

=== Symonds Green ===
Location of Symonds Green ward

Symonds Green
Party	Candidate	Votes	%	±%
Labour	Laurie Chester	733	47.6	−14.0
Conservative	Paul Mould	599	38.9	+11.1
Liberal Democrats	Clive Hearmon	209	13.6	+3.0
Majority		134	8.7	−25.1
Turnout		1,541	35.8	−3.0
Labour hold		Swing		

=== Woodfield ===
Location of Woodfield ward

Woodfield
Party	Candidate	Votes	%	±%
Conservative	Margaret Notley	859	60.6	+5.3
Labour	Richard Rawlings	367	25.9	−3.1
Liberal Democrats	Katherine Lloyd	192	13.5	−2.2
Majority		492	34.7	+8.4
Turnout		1,418	36.3	−0.8
Conservative hold		Swing		
