= 2010 Stevenage Borough Council election =

2010 UK local government election

- 6 May 2010

13 of the 39 seats to Stevenage Borough Council 20 seats needed for a majority
	First party	Second party	Third party
Party	Labour	Conservative	Liberal Democrats
Seats before	30	5	3
Seats won	8	4	1
Seats after	27	9	3
Seat change	▼3	▲4	1
Popular vote	13,670	13,365	8,367
Percentage	35.8%	35.0%	21.9%
- Map showing the results of contested wards in the 2010 Stevenage Borough Council elections.
Council control before election
Labour
Council control after election
Labour

Elections to Stevenage Council were held on 6 May 2010. One third of the council stood for election; the seats which were last contested in 2006. The election saw the Conservative Party gain a further 3 seats.

After the election, the composition of the council was:

- Labour 27
- Conservative 9
- Liberal Democrat 3

== Election result ==
Stevenage local election result 2010
Party	Seats	Gains	Losses	Net gain/loss	Seats %	Votes %	Votes	+/−
Labour	8	0	3	-3	61.5	35.9	13730	-4.2%
Conservative	4	3	0	3	30.8	34.9	13365	-0.5%
Liberal Democrats	1	0	0	0	7.7	21.9	8367	+5.1%
UKIP	0	0	0	0	0	6.3	2402	+2.2%
BNP	0	0	0	0	0	0.4	136	+0.4%
English Democrat	0	0	0	0	0	0.3	133	-2.2%
Independent	0	0	0	0	0	0.3	121	+0.3%

== Ward results ==
=== Bandley Hill ===
Location of Bandley Hill ward

Bandley Hill
Party	Candidate	Votes	%	±%
Labour	Joan Lloyd	1,149	38.6	−3.1
Conservative	Roger Gill	1,055	35.5	+5.3
Liberal Democrats	Barbara Segadelli	497	16.7	+7.2
UKIP	Angela Denness	275	9.2	+9.2
Majority		94	3.1	−8.4
Turnout		2976	61.5	+27.6
Labour hold		Swing		

=== Bedwell ===
Location of Bedwell ward

Bedwell
Party	Candidate	Votes	%	±%
Labour	Brian Underwood	1,114	39.8	−12.8
Conservative	Christine Saint Leitner	744	26.6	−4.6
Liberal Democrats	Leonard Lambert	522	18.6	+2.4
UKIP	Maureen Dilley	421	15.0	+15.0
Majority		370	13.2	−8.2
Turnout		2801	60.0	+28.0
Labour hold		Swing		

=== Chells ===
Location of Chells ward

Chells
Party	Candidate	Votes	%	±%
Labour	Pamela Stuart	1,226	39.1	−4.7
Conservative	Matthew Wyatt	973	31.0	+4.6
Liberal Democrats	Gareth Steiner	937	29.9	+0.1
Majority		253	8.1	−5.9
Turnout		3136	65.2	+27.2
Labour hold		Swing		

=== Longmeadow ===
Location of Longmeadow ward

Longmeadow
Party	Candidate	Votes	%	±%
Conservative	Christine Hurst	1,086	37.5	−2.9
Labour	Suzanne Myson	996	34.4	−3.2
Liberal Democrats	Ralph Baskerville	561	19.4	+7.7
UKIP	Roy Worden	254	8.8	−1.6
Majority		90	3.1	+0.3
Turnout		2897	67.2	+27.7
Conservative gain from Labour		Swing		

=== Manor ===
Location of Manor ward

Manor
Party	Candidate	Votes	%	±%
Liberal Democrats	John Mead	1,427	40.9	+0.1
Conservative	Susan Smith	1,144	32.8	+1.9
Labour	Joseph Sherry	711	20.4	−2.8
UKIP	Mark Rowe	210	6.0	+0.9
Majority		283	8.1	−1.8
Turnout		3492	71.0	+29.7
Liberal Democrats hold		Swing		

=== Martins Wood ===
Location of Martins Wood ward

Martins Wood
Party	Candidate	Votes	%	±%
Conservative	Michael Hearn	1,044	36.6	−1.0
Labour	Jeanette Thomas	921	32.1	−3.2
Liberal Democrats	Kevin Aylward	535	18.6	+11.5
UKIP	Pat Jones	239	8.3	+5.8
English Democrat	John Cooper	133	4.6	−8.7
Majority		123	4.5	+2.2
Turnout		2872	62.3	+26.4
Conservative gain from Labour		Swing		

=== Old Town ===
Location of Old Town ward

Old Town
Party	Candidate	Votes	%	±%
Conservative	Marilyn Yarnold-Foster	1,421	38.7	−3.4
Labour	Pamela Gallagher	1,349	36.7	−4.2
Liberal Democrats	Matthew Snell	662	18.0	+8.8
UKIP	Bernard Maddox	244	6.6	−1.2
Majority		72	2.0	+0.8
Turnout		3676	66.1	+24.9
Conservative gain from Labour		Swing		

=== Pin Green ===
Location of Pin Green ward

Pin Green
Party	Candidate	Votes	%	±%
Labour	Lin Martin-Haugh	1,163	40.9	−6.7
Conservative	Philip Roethenbaugh	881	31.0	+1.5
Liberal Democrats	Scott Copsey	480	16.9	+5.5
UKIP	David McDonagh	181	6.4	+6.4
BNP	Michael Green	136	4.8	+4.8
Majority		282	9.9	−8.2
Turnout		2841	63.1	+31.1
Labour hold		Swing		

=== Roebuck ===
Location of Roebuck ward

Roebuck
Party	Candidate	Votes	%	±%
Labour	Sherma Batson	1,055	37.2	−2.5
Conservative	Harvey Page	943	33.2	+0.1
Liberal Democrats	Denise Baskerville	546	19.2	+7.7
UKIP	Victoria Gabriel	293	10.3	−5.4
Majority		112	4.0	−2.6
Turnout		2837	62.0	+29.1
Labour hold		Swing		

=== St Nicholas ===
Location of St Nicholas ward

St Nicholas
Party	Candidate	Votes	%	±%
Labour	Carol Latif	1,098	41.4	−3.1
Conservative	Gillian Mould	855	32.2	−1.6
Liberal Democrats	Heather Snell	581	21.9	+0.2
Independent	Carol Knowles	121	4.6	+4.6
Majority		243	9.2	−1.5
Turnout		2655	61.2	+29.6
Labour hold		Swing		

=== Shephall ===
Location of Shephall ward

Shephall
Party	Candidate	Votes	%	±%
Labour	Robert Clark	1,035	41.5	−5.9
Conservative	Anita Speight	707	28.4	+2.4
Liberal Democrats	Nicholas Baskerville	465	18.7	+2.5
UKIP	Bob Layson	285	11.4	+1.1
Majority		328	13.1	−8.3
Turnout		2492	58.0	+26.7
Labour hold		Swing		

=== Symonds Green ===
Location of Symonds Green ward

Symonds Green
Party	Candidate	Votes	%	±%
Labour	Sharon Taylor	1,191	42.4	−5.2
Conservative	Paul Mould	1,082	38.5	−0.4
Liberal Democrats	Clive Hearmon	537	19.1	+5.5
Majority		109	3.9	−4.8
Turnout		2810	64.5	+33.2
Labour hold		Swing		

=== Woodfield ===
Location of Woodfield ward

Woodfield
Party	Candidate	Votes	%	±%
Conservative	Phil Bibby	1,430	52.8	−7.8
Labour	Christopher Saunders	662	24.4	−1.5
Liberal Democrats	Katherine Lloyd-Manning	617	22.8	+9.3
Majority		768	28.4	−6.3
Turnout		2709	67.2	+30.9
Conservative gain from UKIP		Swing		

Note: Woodfield ward was won by Marion Mason for the Conservatives in 2006, but she defected to UKIP in January 2008.
