= 2006 Stevenage Borough Council election =

2006 UK local government election

- 4 May 2006

13 of the 39 seats to Stevenage Borough Council 20 seats needed for a majority
	First party	Second party	Third party
Party	Labour	Liberal Democrats	Conservative
Seats before	32	4	3
Seats won	11	1	1
Seats after	32	4	3
Seat change	Steady	Steady	Steady
Popular vote	10,466	4,913	6,711
Percentage	46.4%	21.8%	29.7%
- Map showing the results of contested wards in the 2006 Stevenage Borough Council elections.
Council control before election
Labour
Council control after election
Labour

Elections to Stevenage Council were held on 4 May 2006. One third of the council was up for election; the seats which were last contested in 2002. The Labour Party stayed in overall control of the council.

After the election, the composition of the council was:

- Labour 32
- Liberal Democrat 4
- Conservative 3

== Election result ==
Stevenage local election result 2006
Party	Seats	Gains	Losses	Net gain/loss	Seats %	Votes %	Votes	+/−
Labour	11	0	0	0	84.6	46.4	10,466	+6.6%
Conservative	1	0	0	0	7.7	29.7	6,711	+0.3%
Liberal Democrats	1	0	0	0	7.7	21.8	4,913	-6.5%
English Democrat	0	0	0	0	0	1.2	274	+1.2%
Green	0	0	0	0	0	0.9	202	-1.0%

== Ward results ==
=== Bandley Hill ===
Location of Bandley Hill ward

Bandley Hill
Party	Candidate	Votes	%	±%
Labour	John Lloyd	824	50.9	+5.9
Conservative	Freda Warner	434	26.8	−7.2
Liberal Democrats	Gordon Knight	361	22.3	+1.3
Majority		390	24.1	+13.1
Turnout		1,619		
Labour hold		Swing		

=== Bedwell ===
Location of Bedwell ward

Bedwell
Party	Candidate	Votes	%	±%
Labour	Brian Underwood	1,144	67.1	+17.8
Conservative	Christine Saint-Leitner	561	32.9	+9.7
Majority		583	34.2	+8.1
Turnout		1,705		
Labour hold		Swing		

=== Chells ===
Location of Chells ward

Chells
Party	Candidate	Votes	%	±%
Labour	Pamela Stuart	860	45.5	+10.1
Liberal Democrats	Audrey Griffith	633	33.5	−12.1
Conservative	Julie Seddon	396	21.0	+2.0
Majority		227	12.0	
Turnout		1,889		
Labour hold		Swing		

=== Longmeadow ===
Location of Longmeadow ward

Longmeadow
Party	Candidate	Votes	%	±%
Labour	Suzanne Myson	846	46.9	+10.3
Conservative	Matthew Hurst	618	34.3	−1.6
Liberal Democrats	Ralph Baskerville	340	18.8	−8.7
Majority		228	12.6	+11.9
Turnout		1,804		
Labour hold		Swing		

=== Manor ===
Location of Manor ward

Manor
Party	Candidate	Votes	%	±%
Liberal Democrats	Elisabeth Knight	1,129	52.6	−6.6
Conservative	Susan Smith	545	25.4	+3.4
Labour	Thomas McGarry	472	22.0	+3.2
Majority		584	27.2	−10.0
Turnout		2,146		
Liberal Democrats hold		Swing		

=== Martins Wood ===
Location of Martins Wood ward

Martins Wood
Party	Candidate	Votes	%	±%
Labour	Jeannette Thomas	698	43.4	+7.9
Conservative	Richard Seddon	553	34.4	+2.5
Liberal Democrats	Barbara Segadelli	357	22.2	+2.2
Majority		145	9.0	+5.4
Turnout		1,608		
Labour hold		Swing		

=== Old Town ===
Location of Old Town ward

Old Town
Party	Candidate	Votes	%	±%
Labour	Pamela Gallagher	998	45.6	+5.2
Conservative	James Fraser	732	33.5	−1.1
Liberal Democrats	Margaret Latham	255	11.7	−3.8
Green	Stuart Madgin	202	9.2	−0.4
Majority		266	12.1	+6.3
Turnout		2,187		
Labour hold		Swing		

=== Pin Green ===
Location of Pin Green ward

Pin Green
Party	Candidate	Votes	%	±%
Labour	Tanis Kent	933	52.4	+5.9
Conservative	Mollie Cawthorn	381	21.4	−9.3
English Democrat	Richard Aitkins	274	15.4	+15.4
Liberal Democrats	Mary Griffith	191	10.7	−12.2
Majority		552	31.0	+15.2
Turnout		1,779		
Labour hold		Swing		

=== Roebuck ===
Location of Roebuck ward

Roebuck
Party	Candidate	Votes	%	±%
Labour	Sherma Batson	817	50.0	+5.5
Conservative	Roger Gill	471	28.8	−0.8
Liberal Democrats	Denise Baskerville	347	21.2	−4.6
Majority		346	21.2	+6.3
Turnout		1,635		
Labour hold		Swing		

=== St Nicolas ===
Location of St Nicholas ward

St Nicholas
Party	Candidate	Votes	%	±%
Labour	Caroline Latif	772	50.7	+9.5
Conservative	Matthew Wyatt	398	26.1	−3.5
Liberal Democrats	Heather Snell	353	23.2	−5.9
Majority		374	24.6	+13.0
Turnout		1,523		
Labour hold		Swing		

=== Shephall ===
Location of Shephall ward

Shephall
Party	Candidate	Votes	%	±%
Labour	Robert Clark	805	55.1	+2.5
Liberal Democrats	Nicholas Baskerville	378	25.9	+3.2
Conservative	Leslie Clark	277	19.0	−5.6
Majority		427	29.2	+1.2
Turnout		1,460		
Labour hold		Swing		

=== Symonds Green ===
Location of Symonds Green ward

Symonds Green
Party	Candidate	Votes	%	±%
Labour	Sharon Taylor	909	53.9	+7.3
Conservative	Claire Poole	516	30.6	−2.4
Liberal Democrats	Clive Hearmon	261	15.5	−4.8
Majority		393	23.3	+9.7
Turnout		1,686		
Labour hold		Swing		

=== Woodfield ===
Location of Woodfield ward

Woodfield
Party	Candidate	Votes	%	±%
Conservative	Marion Mason	829	54.4	0.0
Labour	Monika Cherney-Craw	388	25.4	+5.6
Liberal Democrats	Katherine Lloyd	308	20.2	−5.6
Majority		441	29.0	+0.4
Turnout		1,525		
Conservative hold		Swing		
