= 2002 Stevenage Borough Council election =

2002 UK local government election

- 2 May 2002

13 of the 39 seats to Stevenage Borough Council 20 seats needed for a majority
	First party	Second party	Third party
Party	Labour	Conservative	Liberal Democrats
Seats before	33	3	3
Seats won	11	1	1
Seats after	33	3	3
Seat change	Steady	Steady	Steady
Popular vote	16,392	8,027	5,747
Percentage	53.2%	26.1%	18.7%
- Map showing the results of contested wards in the 2002 Stevenage Borough Council elections.
Council control before election
Labour
Council control after election
Labour

Elections to Stevenage Borough Council were held on 2 May 2002. One third of the council was up for election; the seats of the candidates who finished second in each ward in the all-out election of 1999. The Labour Party stayed in overall control of the council, which it had held continuously since 1973.

After the election, the composition of the council was:

- Labour 33
- Liberal Democrat 3
- Conservative 3

== Election result ==
Stevenage local election result 2002
Party	Seats	Gains	Losses	Net gain/loss	Seats %	Votes %	Votes	+/−
Labour	11			0	84.6	53.2	16,392	
Conservative	1			0	7.7	26.1	8,027	
Liberal Democrats	1			0	7.7	18.7	5,747	
Green	0			0	0	1.7	517	
Socialist	0			0	0	0.4	116	

== Ward results ==
=== Bandley Hill ===
Location of Bandley Hill ward

Bandley Hill
Party	Candidate	Votes	%
Labour	Joan Lloyd	1,512	66.0
Conservative	Freda Warner	778	34.0
Majority		734	32.0
Turnout		2,290	

=== Bedwell ===
Location of Bedwell ward

Bedwell
Party	Candidate	Votes	%
Labour	Brian Underwood	1,616	64.2
Conservative	Ralph Dimelow	448	17.8
Liberal Democrats	Leonard Lambert	336	13.4
Socialist	Stephen Glennon	116	4.6
Majority		1,168	46.4
Turnout		2,516	

=== Chells ===
Location of Chells ward

Chells
Party	Candidate	Votes	%
Labour	Pamela Stuart	1,315	52.6
Liberal Democrats	Mary Griffith	737	29.5
Conservative	Susan Smith	450	18.0
Majority		578	23.1
Turnout		2,502	

=== Longmeadow ===
Location of Longmeadow ward

Longmeadow
Party	Candidate	Votes	%
Labour	Suzanne Myson	1,158	49.4
Conservative	William Clark	580	24.8
Liberal Democrats	Margaret Latham	437	18.7
Green	William Hoyes	167	7.1
Majority		578	24.6
Turnout		2,342	

=== Manor ===
Location of Manor ward

Manor
Party	Candidate	Votes	%
Liberal Democrats	Lis Knight	1,459	54.0
Labour	Gordana Bjelic-Rados	700	25.9
Conservative	Prudence Howells	543	20.1
Majority		759	28.1
Turnout		2,702	

=== Martins Wood ===
Location of Martins Wood ward

Martins Wood
Party	Candidate	Votes	%
Labour	David Monaghan	1,166	50.6
Conservative	Matthew Wyatt	641	27.8
Liberal Democrats	Barbara Segadelli	338	14.7
Green	Ian Murrill	161	7.0
Majority		525	22.8
Turnout		2,306	

=== Old Town ===
Location of Old Town ward

Old Town
Party	Candidate	Votes	%
Labour	Pamela Gallagher	1,428	50.7
Conservative	Dilys Clark	815	29.0
Liberal Democrats	Jennifer Moorcroft	382	13.6
Green	Bernard Chapman	189	6.7
Majority		613	21.7
Turnout		2,814	

=== Pin Green ===
Location of Pin Green ward

Pin Green
Party	Candidate	Votes	%
Labour	Tanis Kent	1,369	59.3
Conservative	Leslie Clark	544	23.6
Liberal Democrats	Audrey Griffith	395	17.1
Majority		825	35.7
Turnout		2,308	

=== Roebuck ===
Location of Roebuck ward

Roebuck
Party	Candidate	Votes	%
Labour	Alfred McCarthy	1,246	53.9
Conservative	Anita Speight	597	25.8
Liberal Democrats	Gordon Knight	467	20.2
Majority		649	28.1
Turnout		2,310	

=== St Nicholas ===
Location of St Nicholas ward

St Nicholas
Party	Candidate	Votes	%
Labour	Carol Latif	1,167	54.3
Conservative	Matthew Hurst	494	23.0
Liberal Democrats	Heather Snell	488	22.7
Majority		673	31.3
Turnout		2,149	

=== Shephall ===
Location of Shephall ward

Shephall
Party	Candidate	Votes	%
Labour	Robert Clark	1,436	63.2
Conservative	Christopher Blanchett	433	19.0
Liberal Democrats	Nicholas Baskerville	404	17.8
Majority		1,003	44.2
Turnout		2,273	

=== Symonds Green ===
Location of Symonds Green ward

Symonds Green
Party	Candidate	Votes	%
Labour	Sharon Taylor	1,535	64.6
Conservative	Louisa Notley	841	35.4
Majority		694	29.2
Turnout		2,376	

=== Woodfield ===
Location of Woodfield ward

Woodfield
Party	Candidate	Votes	%
Conservative	Marion Mason	863	45.2
Labour	Ralph Raynor	744	38.9
Liberal Democrats	John Meacham	304	15.9
Majority		119	6.3
Turnout		1,911	
