= 1973 Stevenage Borough Council election =

1973 UK local government election

7 June 1973	1976 →

All 35 seats to Stevenage Borough Council 18 seats needed for a majority
	First party	Second party
	Lab	Con
Leader	Brian Hall	James Boyd
Party	Labour	Conservative
Seats won	32	3
Popular vote	8,643	3,935
Percentage	55.9%	25.5%
Leader after election
Brian Hall
Labour

The 1973 Stevenage Borough Council election were the first elections to the newly created Stevenage Borough Council and took place on 7 June 1973 . This was on the same day as other local elections. The Local Government Act 1972 stipulated that the elected members were to shadow and eventually take over from the predecessor urban district council on 1 April 1974. The election resulted in Labour gaining control of the council, which it has held continuously to the present day. The new council was awarded borough status when it came into its powers on 1 April 1974, allowing the chairman to take the title of mayor. The first mayor was Labour councillor Jim Cockerton.

== Overall results ==
1973 Stevenage Borough Council Election
Party	Seats	Gains	Losses	Net gain/loss	Seats %	Votes %	Votes	+/−
Labour	32	n/a	n/a	n/a	91.4%	55.9%	8,643	n/a
Conservative	3	n/a	n/a	n/a	8.6%	25.5%	3,935	n/a
Liberal	0	n/a	n/a	n/a	0.0%	18.6%	2,880	n/a
Total	35						15,458	
Labour win								

== Ward results ==
=== Bedwell (5 seats) ===
Bedwell (5 seats)
Party	Candidate	Votes	%
Labour	K. Hopkins	1,290	
Labour	R. Fowler	1,270	
Labour	B. Underwood	1,260	
Labour	L. Cummins	1,239	
Labour	D. Wiltshire	1,185	
Conservative	F. Haine	522	
Conservative	A. Flanagan	518	
Conservative	M. Henry	499	
Conservative	M. Richardson	485	
Conservative	E. Trillo	415	
Liberal	A. Robbins	399	
Turnout			37.3%

=== Broadwater (5 seats) ===
Broadwater (5 seats)
Party	Candidate	Votes	%
Labour	J. Cockerton	1,266	
Labour	S. Munden	1,203	
Labour	W. Lawrence	1,200	
Labour	N. Wilson	1,166	
Labour	R. Vogel	1,160	
Liberal	S. Booth	670	
Liberal	E. Brook	669	
Liberal	M. Faraday	662	
Liberal	T. Smallwood	622	
Liberal	N. Smith	612	
Conservative	F. Mumford	367	
Conservative	J. Marsden	361	
Conservative	F. Waitt	334	
Conservative	H. Silberstein	317	
Turnout			33.5%

=== Chells (5 seats) ===
Chells (5 seats)
Party	Candidate	Votes	%
Labour	J. Clarke	1,203	
Labour	P. Metcalfe	1,203	
Labour	M. Cotter	1,194	
Labour	M. Palmer	1,178	
Labour	K. Vale	1,175	
Conservative	M. Britton	336	
Conservative	A. Wilson	327	
Conservative	C. Barker	324	
Conservative	K. McMullen	319	
Conservative	E. Olley	306	
Turnout			23.8%

=== Old Stevenage (6 seats) ===
Old Stevenage (6 seats)
Party	Candidate	Votes	%
Labour	H. Morris	1,327	
Conservative	J. Boyd	1,311	
Conservative	W. Boyd	1,291	
Labour	R. Green	1,261	
Conservative	A. Lines	1,193	
Labour	B. Shea	1,129	
Labour	V. Folbigg	1,116	
Labour	F. Schofield	1,107	
Conservative	K. Stutley	1,043	
Labour	G. Balderstone	1,041	
Conservative	A. Hale	1,007	
Liberal	A. Curling	499	
Liberal	M. Dawson	498	
Turnout			43.8%

=== Pin Green (8 seats) ===
Pin Green (8 seats)
Party	Candidate	Votes	%
Labour	R. Clark	2,170	
Labour	G. Colston	2,139	
Labour	G. Mannall	2,105	
Labour	A. Corner	2,103	
Labour	K. Taylor	2,086	
Labour	T. Morgan	2,057	
Labour	E. Musgrove	2,037	
Labour	D. Rice	2,025	
Conservative	B. Goble	1,194	
Conservative	C. Aylin	1,030	
Conservative	K. Meller	1,019	
Conservative	L. Smith	981	
Conservative	P. McPartland	981	
Conservative	P. Hagger	978	
Conservative	P. Johnson	965	
Conservative	S. Woods	925	
Liberal	M. McDonough	903	
Liberal	I. Hargreaves	878	
Liberal	W. Price	852	
Liberal	R. Abbott	832	
Liberal	L. McDonough	826	
Turnout			35.0%

=== Shephall (6 seats) ===
Shephall (6 seats)
Party	Candidate	Votes	%
Labour	J. Pickersgill	1,387	
Labour	B. Hall	1,370	
Labour	D. Burr	1,356	
Labour	S. Greenfield	1,345	
Labour	I. Johnson	1,340	
Labour	R. Linford	1,316	
Liberal	R. Green	409	
Liberal	G. Robbins	388	
Conservative	D. Sear	205	
Conservative	A. Gibbs	204	
Conservative	M. Gibbs	199	
Conservative	P. Sear	190	
Conservative	P. Goble	169	
Turnout			25.3%
