= 1996 United Kingdom local elections =

- 2 May 1996

All 36 metropolitan boroughs, 14 out of 25 unitary authorities and 100 out of 262 English districts
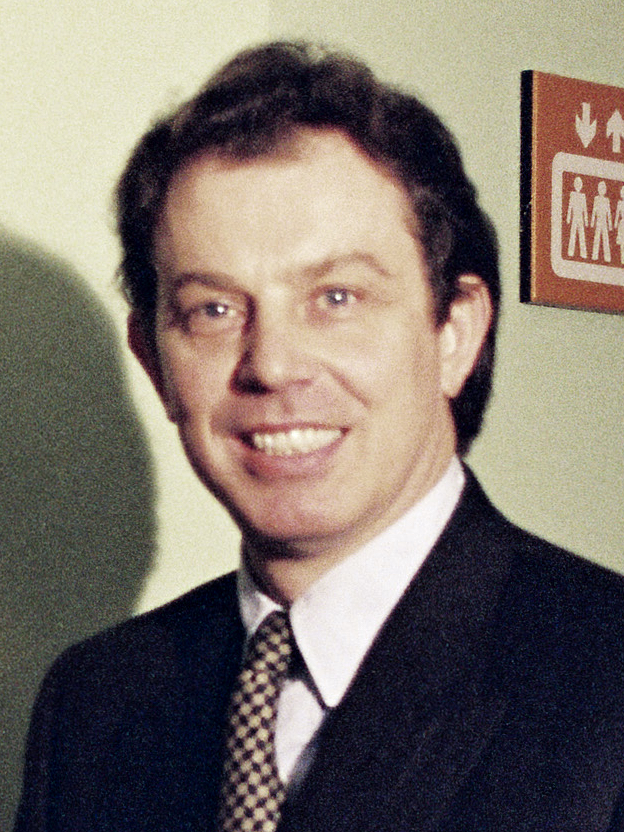

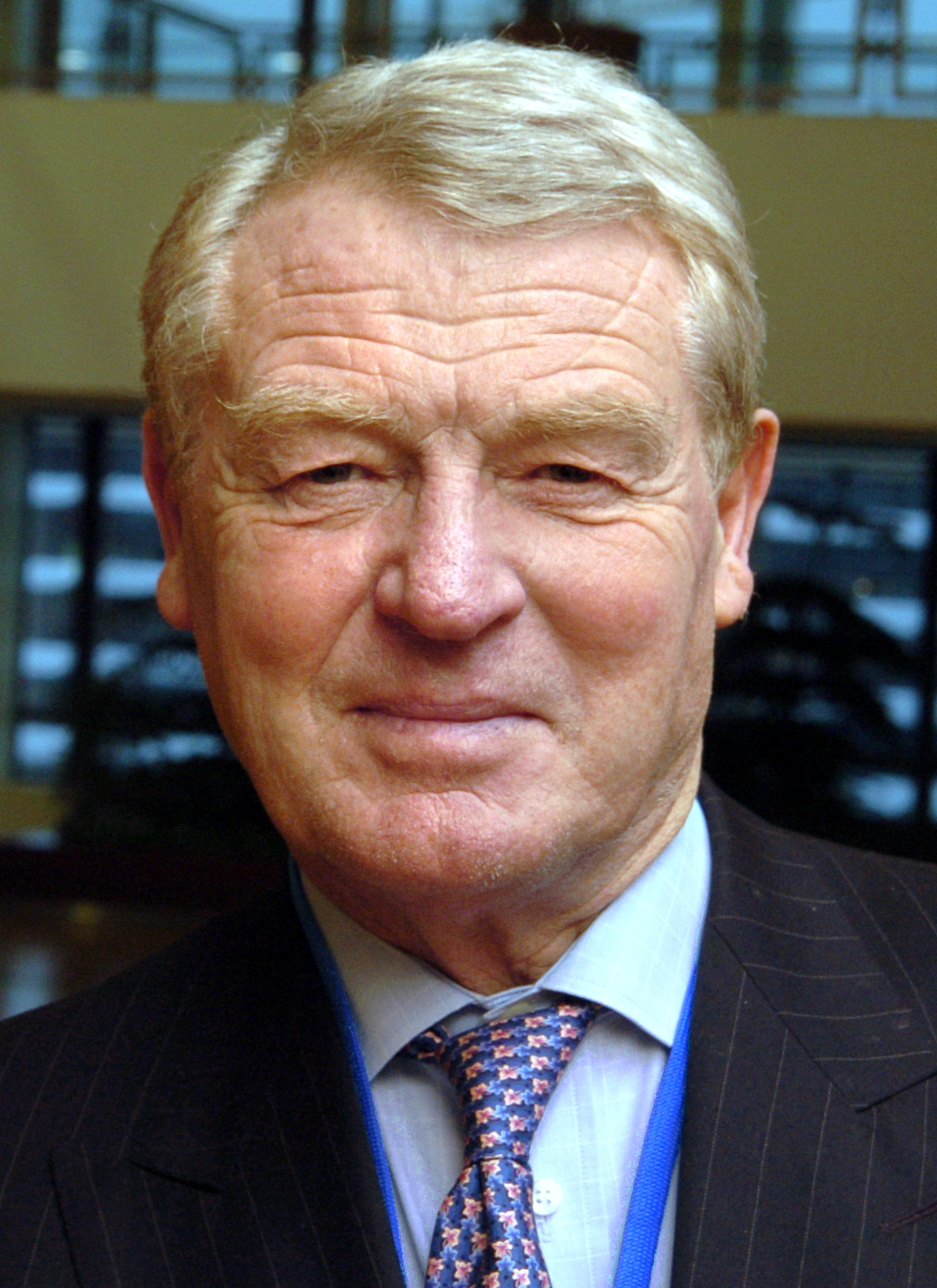

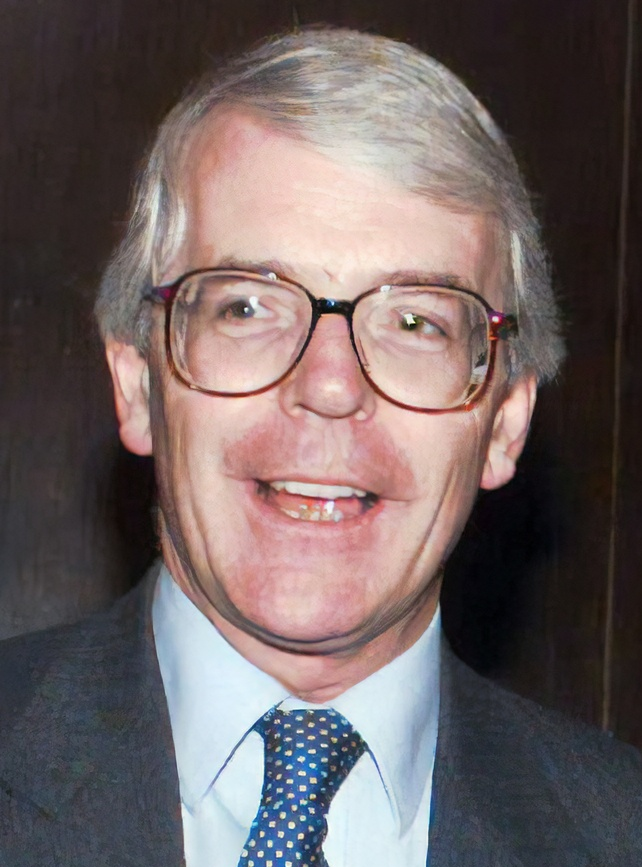
	Majority party	Minority party	Third party
Leader	Tony Blair	Paddy Ashdown	John Major
Party	Labour	Liberal Democrats	Conservative
Leader since	21 July 1994	16 July 1988	27 November 1990 (Note: Major resigned as Leader of the Conservative Party on 22 June 1995 to face critics in his party and government, and was re-elected as Leader on 4 July 1995)
Percentage	43%	26%	29%
Swing	▼4%	▲3%	▲4%
Councillors	10,929	5,078	4,276
Councillors +/-	▲468	▲136	▼607
- Colours denote the winning party, as shown in the table of results.

The 1996 United Kingdom local elections were held on 2 May 1996. They were the last local elections until 2010 to show a decline in the number of Conservative councillors and an increase in the number of Labour councillors.

The main opposition Labour Party gained 468 seats, bringing their number of councillors to 10,929. Their share of the vote was projected to be 43%, 4% down on the 1995 local elections.

The governing Conservative Party lost 607 seats and were left with 4,276 councillors - still in third place behind the Liberal Democrats. The Conservatives' projected share of the vote was 29%, a 4% increase since the previous local elections in 1995.

The Liberal Democrats gained 136 seats and had 5,078 councillors after the elections.

== Results ==
Party	Councils				Councillors			
Party	Gain	Loss	Change	Total	Gain	Loss	Change	Total
Labour			▲+11	87			▲+466	1,744
Liberal Democrats			▲+5	23			▲+150	641
Conservative			▼-1	3			▼-577	518
Other	0	0	▲+3	3			▼-39	127
No overall control	▲+1	▼-16	▼-15	34	—	—	—	—

Source: Parliamentary Research Briefing on 1996 Local Election

== England ==
=== Metropolitan boroughs ===
All 36 metropolitan borough councils had one third of their seats up for election.

Council	Previous control	Result	Details
Barnsley	Labour	Labour hold	Details
Birmingham	Labour	Labour hold	Details
Bolton	Labour	Labour hold	Details
Bradford	Labour	Labour hold	Details
Bury	Labour	Labour hold	Details
Calderdale	Labour	Labour hold	Details
Coventry	Labour	Labour hold	Details
Doncaster	Labour	Labour hold	Details
Dudley	Labour	Labour hold	Details
Gateshead	Labour	Labour hold	Details
Kirklees	Labour	Labour hold	Details
Knowsley	Labour	Labour hold	Details
Leeds	Labour	Labour hold	Details
Liverpool	No overall control	Labour gain	Details
Manchester	Labour	Labour hold	Details
Newcastle upon Tyne	Labour	Labour hold	Details
North Tyneside	Labour	Labour hold	Details
Oldham	Labour	Labour hold	Details
Rochdale	No overall control	Labour gain	Details
Rotherham	Labour	Labour hold	Details
Salford	Labour	Labour hold	Details
Sandwell	Labour	Labour hold	Details
Sefton	No overall control	No overall control hold	Details
Sheffield	Labour	Labour hold	Details
Solihull	No overall control	No overall control hold	Details
South Tyneside	Labour	Labour hold	Details
St Helens	Labour	Labour hold	Details
Stockport	No overall control	No overall control hold	Details
Sunderland	Labour	Labour hold	Details
Tameside	Labour	Labour hold	Details
Trafford	No overall control	Labour gain	Details
Wakefield	Labour	Labour hold	Details
Walsall	Labour	No overall control gain	Details
Wigan	Labour	Labour hold	Details
Wirral	Labour	Labour hold	Details
Wolverhampton	Labour	Labour hold	Details

=== Unitary authorities ===
==== Whole council ====
These were the first elections to 13 more unitary authorities established by the Local Government Commission for England (1992). They acted as "shadow authorities" until 1 April 1997.

Council	Previous control	Result	Details
Bournemouth	New Council	No overall control	Details
Brighton and Hove	New Council	Labour	Details
Darlington	New Council	Labour	Details
Derby	New Council	Labour	Details
Leicester	New Council	Labour	Details
Luton	New Council	Labour	Details
Milton Keynes ‡	New Council	Labour	Details
Poole	New Council	Liberal Democrats	Details
Portsmouth	New Council	Labour	Details
Rutland	New Council	Independent	Details
Southampton	New Council	Labour	Details
Stoke-on-Trent	New Council	Labour	Details
Thamesdown	New Council	Labour	Details

‡ New ward boundaries from predecessor authorities

==== Third of council ====
In 1 unitary authority one third of the council was up for election.

Council	Previous control	Result	Details
Hartlepool	Labour	Labour hold	Details

=== District councils ===
In 100 districts one third of the council was up for election.

These were the last elections to the district councils of Blackburn, Halton, Peterborough, Reading, Slough, Southend-on-Sea, Thurrock and Wokingham before they became unitary authorities by the Local Government Commission for England (1992).

These were also the last elections to the district councils of Gillingham, Hereford, Leominster and South Herefordshire before they were abolished and replaced by unitary authorities by the Local Government Commission for England (1992).

Council	Previous control	Result	Details
Adur	Liberal Democrats	Liberal Democrats hold	Details
Amber Valley	Labour	Labour hold	Details
Barrow-in-Furness	Labour	Labour hold	Details
Basildon	No overall control	Labour gain	Details
Basingstoke and Deane	No overall control	No overall control hold	Details
Bassetlaw	Labour	Labour hold	Details
Bedford	No overall control	No overall control hold	Details
Blackburn	Labour	Labour hold	Details
Brentwood	Liberal Democrats	Liberal Democrats hold	Details
Broadland	No overall control	No overall control hold	Details
Broxbourne	Conservative	Conservative hold	Details
Burnley	Labour	Labour hold	Details
Cambridge	No overall control	Labour gain	Details
Cannock Chase	Labour	Labour hold	Details
Carlisle	Labour	Labour hold	Details
Cheltenham	Liberal Democrats	Liberal Democrats hold	Details
Cherwell	No overall control	Labour gain	Details
Chester	No overall control	No overall control hold	Details
Chorley	Labour	Labour hold	Details
Colchester	Liberal Democrats	Liberal Democrats hold	Details
Congleton	Liberal Democrats	Liberal Democrats hold	Details
Craven	No overall control	Liberal Democrats gain	Details
Crawley	Labour	Labour hold	Details
Crewe and Nantwich	Labour	Labour hold	Details
Daventry	No overall control	No overall control hold	Details
Eastbourne	Liberal Democrats	Liberal Democrats hold	Details
Eastleigh	Liberal Democrats	Liberal Democrats hold	Details
Ellesmere Port and Neston	Labour	Labour hold	Details
Elmbridge	No overall control	No overall control hold	Details
Epping Forest	No overall control	No overall control hold	Details
Exeter	Labour	Labour hold	Details
Fareham	No overall control	No overall control hold	Details
Gillingham	Liberal Democrats	Liberal Democrats hold	Details
Gloucester	Labour	Labour hold	Details
Gosport	Liberal Democrats	Liberal Democrats hold	Details
Great Yarmouth	Labour	Labour hold	Details
Halton	Labour	Labour hold	Details
Harlow	Labour	Labour hold	Details
Harrogate	Liberal Democrats	Liberal Democrats hold	Details
Hart	No overall control	No overall control hold	Details
Hastings	No overall control	Liberal Democrats gain	Details
Havant	No overall control	No overall control hold	Details
Hereford	Liberal Democrats	Liberal Democrats hold	Details
Hertsmere	No overall control	Labour gain	Details
Huntingdonshire	Conservative	Conservative hold	Details
Hyndburn	Labour	Labour hold	Details
Ipswich	Labour	Labour hold	Details
Leominster	No overall control	Independent gain	Details
Lincoln	Labour	Labour hold	Details
Macclesfield	Conservative	Conservative hold	Details
Maidstone	No overall control	No overall control hold	Details
Mole Valley	No overall control	No overall control hold	Details
Newcastle-under-Lyme	Labour	Labour hold	Details
North Hertfordshire	No overall control	Labour gain	Details
Norwich	Labour	Labour hold	Details
Nuneaton and Bedworth	Labour	Labour hold	Details
Oxford	Labour	Labour hold	Details
Pendle	Liberal Democrats	Liberal Democrats hold	Details
Penwith	No overall control	No overall control hold	Details
Peterborough	No overall control	Labour gain	Details
Preston	Labour	Labour hold	Details
Purbeck	No overall control	No overall control hold	Details
Reading	Labour	Labour hold	Details
Redditch	Labour	Labour hold	Details
Reigate and Banstead	No overall control	No overall control hold	Details
Rochford	Liberal Democrats	Liberal Democrats hold	Details
Rossendale	Labour	Labour hold	Details
Rugby	No overall control	No overall control hold	Details
Runnymede	Conservative	No overall control gain	Details
Rushmoor	No overall control	No overall control hold	Details
Shrewsbury and Atcham	No overall control	No overall control hold	Details
Slough	Labour	Labour hold	Details
South Bedfordshire	No overall control	No overall control hold	Details
South Cambridgeshire	No overall control	No overall control hold	Details
South Herefordshire	Independent	Independent hold	Details
South Lakeland	No overall control	No overall control hold	Details
Southend-on-Sea	No overall control	No overall control hold	Details
St Albans	Liberal Democrats	Liberal Democrats hold	Details
Stevenage	Labour	Labour hold	Details
Stratford-on-Avon	No overall control	No overall control hold	Details
Stroud	No overall control	No overall control hold	Details
Swale	No overall control	No overall control hold	Details
Tamworth	Labour	Labour hold	Details
Tandridge	No overall control	No overall control hold	Details
Three Rivers	No overall control	No overall control hold	Details
Thurrock	Labour	Labour hold	Details
Tunbridge Wells	No overall control	Liberal Democrats gain	Details
Watford	Labour	Labour hold	Details
Waveney	Labour	Labour hold	Details
Welwyn Hatfield	Labour	Labour hold	Details
West Lancashire	Labour	Labour hold	Details
West Lindsey	No overall control	Liberal Democrats gain	Details
West Oxfordshire	No overall control	No overall control hold	Details
Weymouth and Portland	No overall control	No overall control hold	Details
Winchester	Liberal Democrats	Liberal Democrats hold	Details
Woking	No overall control	Liberal Democrats gain	Details
Wokingham	No overall control	Liberal Democrats gain	Details
Worcester	Labour	Labour hold	Details
Worthing	Liberal Democrats	Liberal Democrats hold	Details
Wyre Forest	No overall control	Labour gain	Details
