= 1996 Waveney District Council election =

1996 English local government election

- 2 May 1996

All 48 seats to Waveney District Council 25 seats needed for a majority

	First party	Second party	Third party
Party	Labour	Conservative	Liberal Democrats
Seats won	14	1	1
Seats after	44	2	2
Seat change	▲8	▼8	Steady
Popular vote	17,274	6,660	3,282
Percentage	61.4%	23.5%	11.7%
Swing	▼0.5%	▼0.3%	▼2.6%
- Winner of each seat at the 1996 Waveney District Council election.
Control before election
Labour
Control after election
Labour

The 1996 Waveney District Council election took place on 2 May 1996 to elect members of Waveney District Council in Suffolk, England. This was on the same day as other local elections.

== Summary ==
=== Election result ===
1996 Waveney District Council election
Party	This election			Full council			This election		
Party	Seats	Net	Seats %	Other	Total	Total %	Votes	Votes %	+/−
Labour	14	▲8	87.5	30	44	91.7	17,274	61.4	–0.5
Conservative	1	▼8	6.3	1	2	4.2	6,600	23.5	–0.3
Liberal Democrats	1	Steady	6.3	1	2	4.2	3,282	11.7	–2.6
Independent	0	Steady	0.0	0	0	0.0	956	3.4	N/A

== Ward results ==
Incumbent councillors standing for re-election are marked with an asterisk (*). Changes in seats do not take into account by-elections or defections.

=== Beccles Town ===
Beccles Town
Party	Candidate	Votes	%	±%
Liberal Democrats	E. Crisp	1,098	44.8	
Labour	C. Scott	1,018	41.6	
Conservative	V. Pulford	334	13.6	
Majority		80	3.3	
Turnout		2,450	42.3	
Registered electors		5,809		
Liberal Democrats gain from Conservative		Swing		

=== Beccles Worlingham ===
Beccles Worlingham
Party	Candidate	Votes	%	±%
Labour	A. Kemp	933	63.2	
Conservative	M. Bee	543	36.8	
Majority		390	26.4	
Turnout		1,476	36.6	
Registered electors		4,054		
Labour gain from Conservative		Swing		

=== Bungay ===
Bungay
Party	Candidate	Votes	%	±%
Labour	D. Jermy*	1,124	69.4	
Conservative	M. Davies	495	30.6	
Majority		629	38.9	
Turnout		1,619	42.5	
Registered electors		3,815		
Labour hold		Swing		

=== Carlton ===
Carlton
Party	Candidate	Votes	%	±%
Labour	J. Spoor	1,360	62.8	
Conservative	D. Collins*	588	27.1	
Liberal Democrats	C. Thomas	218	10.1	
Majority		772	35.6	
Turnout		2,166	35.0	
Registered electors		6,211		
Labour gain from Conservative		Swing		

=== Carlton Colville ===
Carlton Colville
Party	Candidate	Votes	%	±%
Labour	N. Keable	724	43.3	
Independent	J. Mitchell	602	36.0	
Conservative	R. Bell*	346	20.7	
Majority		122	7.3	
Turnout		1,672	35.6	
Registered electors		4,540		
Labour gain from Conservative		Swing		

=== Gunton ===
Gunton
Party	Candidate	Votes	%	±%
Labour	P. Hart	959	50.6	
Conservative	B. Reader	447	23.6	
Independent	J. Wright*	354	18.7	
Liberal Democrats	A. Martin	137	7.2	
Majority		512	27.0	
Turnout		1,897	37.1	
Registered electors		5,115		
Labour gain from Conservative		Swing		

=== Halesworth ===
Halesworth
Party	Candidate	Votes	%	±%
Labour	P. Whitlow	905	61.3	
Conservative	F. Burroughes*	571	38.7	
Majority		334	22.6	
Turnout		1,476	40.3	
Registered electors		3,671		
Labour gain from Conservative		Swing		

=== Harbour ===
Harbour
Party	Candidate	Votes	%	±%
Labour	S. Bostock*	930	79.2	
Conservative	S. Ames	143	12.2	
Liberal Democrats	D. Randoll	101	8.6	
Majority		787	67.0	
Turnout		1,174	28.3	
Registered electors		4,147		
Labour hold		Swing		

=== Kessingland ===
Kessingland
Party	Candidate	Votes	%	±%
Labour	K. McGee	776	65.8	
Conservative	P. Austin	273	23.2	
Liberal Democrats	R. Cant	130	11.0	
Majority		503	42.7	
Turnout		1,179	32.3	
Registered electors		3,654		
Labour gain from Conservative		Swing		

=== Kirkley ===
Kirkley
Party	Candidate	Votes	%	±%
Labour	K. Francis	980	51.8	
Liberal Democrats	A. Shepherd	762	40.3	
Conservative	M. Regester	149	7.9	
Majority		218	11.5	
Turnout		1,891	42.8	
Registered electors		4,421		
Labour gain from Liberal Democrats		Swing		

=== Normanston ===
Normanston
Party	Candidate	Votes	%	±%
Labour	M. Gurney	1,114	76.1	
Conservative	H. Boyd	181	12.4	
Liberal Democrats	S. Tonge	168	11.5	
Majority		933	63.8	
Turnout		1,463	33.7	
Registered electors		4,344		
Labour hold		Swing		

=== Oulton Broad ===
Oulton Broad
Party	Candidate	Votes	%	±%
Labour	M. Cherry	1,194	61.1	
Conservative	A. Choveaux	548	28.0	
Liberal Democrats	A. Tibbitt	212	10.8	
Majority		646	33.1	
Turnout		1,954	36.5	
Registered electors		5,361		
Labour gain from Conservative		Swing		

=== Pakefield ===
Pakefield
Party	Candidate	Votes	%	±%
Labour	R. Thorne*	1,543	70.9	
Conservative	F. Gaimster	442	20.3	
Liberal Democrats	D. Young	190	8.7	
Majority		1,101	50.6	
Turnout		2,175	39.4	
Registered electors		5,519		
Labour hold		Swing		

=== Southwold ===
Southwold
Party	Candidate	Votes	%	±%
Conservative	J. Goldsmith*	1,179	51.4	
Labour	K. Kirk	1,115	48.6	
Majority		64	2.8	
Turnout		2,294	44.8	
Registered electors		5,125		
Conservative hold		Swing		

=== St. Margarets ===
St. Margarets
Party	Candidate	Votes	%	±%
Labour	M. Ayers	1,296	76.9	
Conservative	A. Mylan	236	14.0	
Liberal Democrats	B. Howe	153	9.1	
Majority		1,060	62.9	
Turnout		1,685	30.7	
Registered electors		5,496		
Labour hold		Swing		

=== Whitton ===
Whitton
Party	Candidate	Votes	%	±%
Labour	R. Carter*	1,303	84.6	
Conservative	B. Bee	125	8.1	
Liberal Democrats	G. Strachan	113	7.3	
Majority		1,178	76.4	
Turnout		1,541	35.6	
Registered electors		4,338		
Labour hold		Swing		

== By-elections ==
=== Normanston ===
Normanston by-election: 1 May 1997
Party	Candidate	Votes	%	±%
Labour		2,042	69.1	
Conservative		599	20.3	
Liberal Democrats		315	10.7	
Majority		1,443	48.8	
Turnout		2,956	67.5	
Registered electors		4,379		
Labour hold		Swing		

=== Kirkley ===
Kirkley by-election: 31 July 1997
Party	Candidate	Votes	%	±%
Labour		705	50.3	
Liberal Democrats		612	43.7	
Conservative		84	6.0	
Majority		93	6.6	
Turnout		1,401	30.0	
Registered electors		4,670		
Labour hold		Swing		

=== Pakefield ===
Pakefield by-election: 31 July 1997
Party	Candidate	Votes	%	±%
Labour		852	74.7	
Conservative		215	18.9	
Liberal Democrats		73	6.4	
Majority		637	55.9	
Turnout		1,140	20.0	
Registered electors		5,700		
Labour hold		Swing		
