= 1996 Watford Borough Council election =

Watford Borough Council election

The 1996 Watford Borough Council election took place in 1996 to elect members of Watford Borough Council in England. This was the same day as other local elections.

== Result summary ==
1996 Watford Borough Council election
Party	This election			Full council			This election		
Party	Seats	Net	Seats %	Other	Total	Total %	Votes	Votes %	+/−
Labour	7	Steady	58.3	14	21	58.3	8,732	42.7	-4.0
Liberal Democrats	3	▲2	25.0	6	9	25.0	6,829	33.4	-0.5
Conservative	2	▼2	16.7	4	6	16.7	4,872	23.8	+4.4

== Ward results ==
=== Callowland ===
Callowland
Party	Candidate	Votes	%	±%
Labour	P. Harrison	621	63.2	+2.6
Liberal Democrats	I. Roberts	226	23.0	−4.3
Conservative	M. Taylor	136	13.8	+1.7
Majority			40.2	
Turnout		983	25.0	
Labour hold		Swing	▲3.5	

=== Central ===
Central
Party	Candidate	Votes	%	±%
Labour	V. Muspratt	909	53.3	−0.1
Liberal Democrats	M. Soodin	597	35.0	−2.1
Conservative	P. Rosen	200	11.7	+2.2
Majority			18.3	
Turnout		1,706	34.0	
Labour hold		Swing	▲1.0	

=== Holywell ===
Holywell
Party	Candidate	Votes	%	±%
Labour	A. Head	778	66.4	±0.0
Conservative	P. Jenkins	200	17.1	+3.4
Liberal Democrats	R. Laslett	194	16.6	−3.4
Majority			49.3	
Turnout		1,172	25.0	
Labour hold		Swing	▼1.7	

=== Leggatts ===
Leggatts
Party	Candidate	Votes	%	±%
Labour	M. Green	789	56.8	−10.8
Conservative	N. Herd	413	29.7	+17.0
Liberal Democrats	M. Saeed	188	13.5	−6.2
Majority			27.1	
Turnout		1,390	33.0	
Labour hold		Swing	▼13.9	

=== Meriden ===
Meriden
Party	Candidate	Votes	%	±%
Labour	P. Woodward	933	62.3	−3.6
Conservative	P. Bell	328	21.9	+3.2
Liberal Democrats	M. Lane	236	15.8	+0.4
Majority			40.4	
Turnout		1,497	28.0	
Labour hold		Swing	▼3.4	

=== Nascot ===
Nascot
Party	Candidate	Votes	%	±%
Conservative	J. Price	828	48.3	+2.5
Labour	T. Meldrum	515	30.0	+3.2
Liberal Democrats	M. Gardner	371	21.6	−5.8
Majority			18.3	
Turnout		1,714	32.0	
Conservative hold		Swing	▼0.4	

=== Oxhey ===
Oxhey
Party	Candidate	Votes	%	±%
Liberal Democrats	D. Thornhill	1,106	62.2	+9.0
Conservative	L. McQuaid	377	21.1	−0.3
Labour	R. Atkin	295	16.6	−8.7
Majority			41.0	
Turnout		1,778	38.0	
Liberal Democrats hold		Swing	▲4.7	

=== Park ===
Park
Party	Candidate	Votes	%	±%
Conservative	K. Solomon	1,020	54.8	+4.0
Liberal Democrats	P. Jenkins	558	30.0	−1.4
Labour	C. Barry	284	15.3	−2.5
Majority			24.8	
Turnout		1,862	45.0	
Conservative hold		Swing	▲2.7	

=== Stanborough ===
Stanborough
Party	Candidate	Votes	%	±%
Liberal Democrats	G. Burrow	902	42.8	+11.4
Conservative	S. Jones	637	30.2	−20.6
Labour	K. Errington	570	27.0	+9.2
Majority			12.6	
Turnout		2,109	43.0	
Liberal Democrats gain from Conservative		Swing	▲16.0	

=== Tudor ===
Tudor
Party	Candidate	Votes	%	±%
Labour	A. Kerby	968	54.4	+4.4
Liberal Democrats	J. Richmond	463	26.0	−11.7
Conservative	C. Strange	350	19.7	+7.4
Majority			28.4	
Turnout		1,781	35.0	
Labour gain from Conservative		Swing	▲8.1	

=== Vicarage ===
Vicarage
Party	Candidate	Votes	%	±%
Labour	A. Choudhrey	1,110	51.3	+1.4
Liberal Democrats	J. Baddeley	855	39.5	−1.1
Conservative	D. Ealey	198	9.2	−0.3
Majority			11.8	
Turnout		2,163	41.0	
Labour hold		Swing	▲1.3	

=== Woodside ===
Woodside
Party	Candidate	Votes	%	±%
Liberal Democrats	E. Burtenshaw	1,133	49.7	+3.6
Labour	M. Jackson	960	42.1	−4.4
Conservative	J. Janson	185	8.1	+0.7
Majority			7.6	
Turnout		2,278	46.0	
Liberal Democrats gain from Labour		Swing	▲4.0	
