= 1996 Bedford Borough Council election =

1996 UK local government election

The 1996 Bedford Borough Council election took place on 2 May 1996 to elect members of Bedford Borough Council in England. This was on the same day as other local elections.

== Summary ==
=== Election result ===
1996 Bedford Borough Council election
| Party | This election | | | Full council | | | This election | | |
| Party | Seats | Net | Seats % | Other | Total | Total % | Votes | Votes % | +/− |
|---|---|---|---|---|---|---|---|---|---|
| Labour | 7 | ▲2 | 38.9 | 15 | 22 | 41.5 | 12,789 | 41.0 | –3.0 |
| Liberal Democrats | 6 | ▲4 | 33.3 | 10 | 16 | 30.2 | 8,195 | 26.3 | –0.9 |
| Conservative | 3 | ▼6 | 16.7 | 7 | 10 | 18.9 | 8,876 | 28.5 | +2.8 |
| Independent | 2 | Steady | 11.1 | 3 | 5 | 9.4 | 1,338 | 4.3 | +1.7 |

== Ward results ==
=== Brickhill ===
Brickhill
| Party | Candidate | Votes | % | ±% |
|---|---|---|---|---|
| Liberal Democrats | Cheryl Green | 1,309 | 57.9 | +9.7 |
| Conservative | Paul Sinclair | 542 | 24.0 | –23.2 |
| Labour | Ivor Amery | 410 | 18.1 | +13.6 |
| Majority | | 767 | 33.9 | |
| Turnout | | 2,261 | 39.9 | |
| Registered electors | | 5,698 | | |
| Liberal Democrats hold | | Swing | | |

=== Bromham ===
Bromham
| Party | Candidate | Votes | % | ±% |
|---|---|---|---|---|
| Conservative | Graham Bates* | 1,126 | 64.3 | −12.4 |
| Labour | R. Gunther | 348 | 19.9 | +12.7 |
| Liberal Democrats | Christopher Hall | 278 | 15.9 | –0.2 |
| Majority | | 778 | 44.4 | |
| Turnout | | 1,752 | 38.1 | |
| Registered electors | | 4,594 | | |
| Conservative hold | | Swing | | |

=== Carlton ===
Carlton
| Party | Candidate | Votes | % | ±% |
|---|---|---|---|---|
| Independent | Victor Brandon* | 704 | 80.5 | –2.7 |
| Labour | Anthea Cooke | 171 | 19.5 | +10.7 |
| Majority | | 533 | 60.9 | |
| Turnout | | 875 | 51.7 | |
| Registered electors | | 1,709 | | |
| Independent hold | | Swing | | |

=== Castle ===
Castle
| Party | Candidate | Votes | % | ±% |
|---|---|---|---|---|
| Labour | Catherine Moorhouse | 1,071 | 55.0 | +18.5 |
| Conservative | Robert Rigby* | 704 | 36.2 | −2.6 |
| Liberal Democrats | Susan Vogel | 171 | 8.8 | –15.9 |
| Majority | | 367 | 18.9 | |
| Turnout | | 1,946 | 42.4 | |
| Registered electors | | 4,479 | | |
| Labour gain from Conservative | | Swing | | |

=== Cauldwell ===
Cauldwell
| Party | Candidate | Votes | % | ±% |
|---|---|---|---|---|
| Labour | Robert Elford* | 1,310 | 75.9 | +5.7 |
| Conservative | C. Burroughs | 250 | 14.5 | −5.5 |
| Liberal Democrats | Philip Standley | 166 | 9.6 | –0.3 |
| Majority | | 1,060 | 61.4 | |
| Turnout | | 1,726 | 28.4 | |
| Registered electors | | 6,080 | | |
| Labour hold | | Swing | | |

=== Clapham ===
Clapham
| Party | Candidate | Votes | % | ±% |
|---|---|---|---|---|
| Independent | R. Chybalski* | 429 | 43.3 | −0.2 |
| Conservative | Frederick Sparrow | 290 | 29.3 | −4.4 |
| Labour | A. Creer | 271 | 27.4 | +8.3 |
| Majority | | 139 | 14.0 | |
| Turnout | | 990 | 39.5 | |
| Registered electors | | 2,468 | | |
| Independent hold | | Swing | | |

=== De Parys ===
De Parys
| Party | Candidate | Votes | % | ±% |
|---|---|---|---|---|
| Liberal Democrats | Mike Smithson | 1,200 | 51.8 | +9.9 |
| Conservative | David Pinkney | 704 | 30.4 | −18.9 |
| Labour | Paban Sharma | 411 | 17.8 | +9.0 |
| Majority | | 496 | 21.4 | |
| Turnout | | 2,315 | 43.3 | |
| Registered electors | | 5,388 | | |
| Liberal Democrats gain from Conservative | | Swing | | |

=== Eastcotts ===
Eastcotts
| Party | Candidate | Votes | % | ±% |
|---|---|---|---|---|
| Liberal Democrats | Charles Parsons | 537 | 46.3 | +8.9 |
| Conservative | Lynne Faulkner | 396 | 34.1 | –19.7 |
| Labour | Caron Rosovske | 227 | 19.6 | +10.8 |
| Majority | | 141 | 12.2 | |
| Turnout | | 1,160 | 51.0 | |
| Registered electors | | 2,284 | | |
| Liberal Democrats gain from Conservative | | Swing | | |

=== Goldington ===
Goldington
| Party | Candidate | Votes | % | ±% |
|---|---|---|---|---|
| Liberal Democrats | Christine McHugh | 984 | 48.2 | –9.2 |
| Labour | John Dawson | 822 | 40.2 | +15.1 |
| Conservative | Lewis Williams | 237 | 11.6 | −6.0 |
| Majority | | 162 | 7.9 | |
| Turnout | | 2,043 | 39.1 | |
| Registered electors | | 5,320 | | |
| Liberal Democrats hold | | Swing | | |

=== Harpur ===
Harpur
| Party | Candidate | Votes | % | ±% |
|---|---|---|---|---|
| Labour | Julie Sturgess | 1,128 | 64.8 | +10.1 |
| Conservative | Janet Pilgrim | 452 | 26.0 | −12.0 |
| Liberal Democrats | L. Thomas | 161 | 9.2 | +2.0 |
| Majority | | 676 | 38.8 | |
| Turnout | | 1,741 | 29.7 | |
| Registered electors | | 5,895 | | |
| Labour hold | | Swing | | |

=== Kempston East ===
Kempston East
| Party | Candidate | Votes | % | ±% |
|---|---|---|---|---|
| Labour | Sesa Lehal* | 1,333 | 57.6 | +18.5 |
| Conservative | Sion Eynon | 706 | 30.5 | –23.9 |
| Liberal Democrats | C. Kelly | 277 | 12.0 | +5.5 |
| Majority | | 627 | 27.1 | |
| Turnout | | 2,316 | 32.5 | |
| Registered electors | | 7,203 | | |
| Labour gain from Conservative | | Swing | | |

Labour had previously gained the Conservative seat in a by-election.

=== Kempston West ===
Kempston West
| Party | Candidate | Votes | % | ±% |
|---|---|---|---|---|
| Labour | William Hunt | 1,251 | 63.9 | +25.6 |
| Conservative | Jagdish Singh | 513 | 26.2 | –28.1 |
| Liberal Democrats | Stephen Lawson | 193 | 9.9 | +4.4 |
| Majority | | 638 | 37.7 | |
| Turnout | | 2,057 | 31.3 | |
| Registered electors | | 6,329 | | |
| Labour gain from Conservative | | Swing | | |

=== Kingsbrook ===
Kingsbrook
| Party | Candidate | Votes | % | ±% |
|---|---|---|---|---|
| Labour | Ian Luder* | 1,053 | 69.6 | +12.9 |
| Liberal Democrats | Terence Dunning | 247 | 16.3 | +3.8 |
| Conservative | Barbara Wonford | 214 | 14.1 | −16.7 |
| Majority | | 806 | 53.3 | |
| Turnout | | 1,514 | 30.9 | |
| Registered electors | | 4,919 | | |
| Labour hold | | Swing | | |

=== Newnham ===
Newnham
| Party | Candidate | Votes | % | ±% |
|---|---|---|---|---|
| Conservative | John Mingay* | 828 | 43.5 | −2.5 |
| Labour | Richard Crane | 629 | 33.0 | +14.7 |
| Liberal Democrats | Anthony Cardus | 447 | 23.5 | –12.1 |
| Majority | | 199 | 10.5 | |
| Turnout | | 1,904 | 39.9 | |
| Registered electors | | 4,780 | | |
| Conservative hold | | Swing | | |

=== Putnoe ===
Putnoe
| Party | Candidate | Votes | % | ±% |
|---|---|---|---|---|
| Liberal Democrats | William Muir | 1,191 | 57.6 | +17.3 |
| Conservative | Christopher Wesley | 579 | 28.0 | −25.9 |
| Labour | Siamak Vakilpour | 299 | 14.5 | +8.7 |
| Majority | | 612 | 29.6 | |
| Turnout | | 2,069 | 38.8 | |
| Registered electors | | 5,343 | | |
| Liberal Democrats gain from Conservative | | Swing | | |

=== Queens Park ===
Queens Park
| Party | Candidate | Votes | % | ±% |
|---|---|---|---|---|
| Labour | Tony Albone | 1,435 | 70.6 | +12.1 |
| Conservative | Domenico De Benedictis | 421 | 20.7 | −9.1 |
| Liberal Democrats | J. Crofts | 178 | 8.8 | –2.9 |
| Majority | | 1,014 | 49.9 | |
| Turnout | | 2,034 | 33.8 | |
| Registered electors | | 6,068 | | |
| Labour hold | | Swing | | |

=== Roxton ===
Roxton
| Party | Candidate | Votes | % | ±% |
|---|---|---|---|---|
| Conservative | A. May | 489 | 63.8 | –18.7 |
| Labour | Terence Carroll | 158 | 20.6 | +11.7 |
| Liberal Democrats | Paul Westerman | 119 | 15.5 | +6.9 |
| Majority | | 331 | 43.2 | |
| Turnout | | 766 | 41.4 | |
| Registered electors | | 1,861 | | |
| Conservative hold | | Swing | | |

=== Wootton ===
Wootton
| Party | Candidate | Votes | % | ±% |
|---|---|---|---|---|
| Liberal Democrats | Judith Cunningham | 737 | 40.3 | +32.2 |
| Labour | Andrew Asquith | 462 | 25.2 | +4.1 |
| Conservative | John Tait* | 426 | 23.3 | –47.5 |
| Independent | Paul Quirk | 205 | 11.2 | N/A |
| Majority | | 275 | 15.0 | |
| Turnout | | 1,830 | 47.1 | |
| Registered electors | | 3,883 | | |
| Liberal Democrats gain from Conservative | | Swing | | |
