= 1996 Welwyn Hatfield District Council election =

Welwyn Hatfield District Council election

The 1996 Welwyn Hatfield District Council election took place on 2 May 1996 to elect members of Welwyn Hatfield District Council in England. This was on the same day as other local elections.

== Summary ==
=== Election result ===
1996 Welwyn Hatfield District Council election
Party	This election			Full council			This election		
Party	Seats	Net	Seats %	Other	Total	Total %	Votes	Votes %	+/−
Labour	11	▲4	73.3	20	31	66.0	16,558	55.7	+4.2
Conservative	4	▼4	26.7	12	16	34.0	9,355	31.4	–1.4
Liberal Democrats	0	Steady	0.0	0	0	0.0	3,696	12.4	–1.7
Independent	0	Steady	0.0	0	0	0.0	140	0.5	–1.0
