= 1996 St Albans City and District Council election =

St Albans City and District Council election

The 1996 St Albans City and District Council election took place on 2 May 1996 to elect members of St Albans City and District Council in England. This was on the same day as other local elections.

== Election result ==
1996 St Albans City and District Council election
Party	This election			Full council			This election		
Party	Seats	Net	Seats %	Other	Total	Total %	Votes	Votes %	+/−
Liberal Democrats	10	▲5	52.6	29	39	68.4	13,937	37.5	-4.3
Labour	5	▲2	26.3	7	12	21.1	12,533	33.7	+2.5
Conservative	4	▼7	21.1	2	6	10.5	10,678	28.7	+2.7

== Ward results ==
=== Ashley ===
Ashley
Party	Candidate	Votes	%	±%
Labour	A. Cooper	1,135	48.6	+3.0
Liberal Democrats	A. Goodyear*	898	38.4	–3.5
Conservative	D. Caroline	304	13.0	+0.6
Majority		237	10.1	+6.4
Turnout		2,337	45.4	–1.4
Registered electors		5,150		
Labour gain from Liberal Democrats		Swing	▲3.3	

=== Batchwood ===
Batchwood
Party	Candidate	Votes	%	±%
Labour	R. Mills*	1,192	66.4	–0.1
Liberal Democrats	R. Law	306	17.1	–2.1
Conservative	P. Farley	296	16.5	+4.6
Majority		886	49.4	+2.1
Turnout		1,794	36.5	–3.9
Registered electors		4,931		
Labour hold		Swing	▲1.0	

No Green candidate as previous (2.4%).

=== Clarence ===
Clarence
Party	Candidate	Votes	%	±%
Liberal Democrats	J. Wright	938	49.4	–4.4
Labour	D. Pratley	609	32.1	+4.4
Conservative	J. Christie	353	18.6	±0.0
Majority		329	17.3	–8.7
Turnout		1,900	43.8	+0.8
Registered electors		4,357		
Liberal Democrats hold		Swing	▼4.4	

=== Colney Heath ===
Colney Heath
Party	Candidate	Votes	%	±%
Liberal Democrats	S. Defoe*	562	52.9	–11.7
Labour	G. Humbles	265	25.0	+7.6
Conservative	D. Jeffrey	235	22.1	+4.1
Majority		297	28.0	–18.5
Turnout		1,062	37.8	–13.1
Registered electors		2,810		
Liberal Democrats hold		Swing	▼9.7	

=== Cunningham ===
Cunningham
Party	Candidate	Votes	%	±%
Liberal Democrats	K. Clegg*	907	44.2	–10.8
Labour	J. Gipps	856	41.7	+10.3
Conservative	M. Elsdon	291	14.2	+0.6
Majority		51	2.5	–21.0
Turnout		2,054	42.5	–1.2
Registered electors		4,843		
Liberal Democrats hold		Swing	▼10.6	

=== Harpenden East ===
Harpenden East
Party	Candidate	Votes	%	±%
Liberal Democrats	A. Steer	889	43.1	–7.0
Conservative	M. Hughes	726	35.2	+6.4
Labour	D. Crew	450	21.8	+0.7
Majority		163	7.9	–13.4
Turnout		2,065	40.7	–3.0
Registered electors		5,088		
Liberal Democrats gain from Conservative		Swing	▼6.7	

=== Harpenden North ===
Harpenden North
Party	Candidate	Votes	%	±%
Liberal Democrats	B. Peyton	948	45.4	–0.7
Conservative	A. Pawle	704	33.7	+1.8
Labour	C. Wade	435	20.8	±0.0
Majority		244	11.7	–2.5
Turnout		2,087	35.8	–3.6
Registered electors		5,842		
Liberal Democrats gain from Conservative		Swing	▼1.3	

=== Harpenden South ===
Harpenden South
Party	Candidate	Votes	%	±%
Conservative	M. Morrell*	1,030	51.7	+8.0
Liberal Democrats	G. Ransom	574	28.8	–13.1
Labour	K. Holmes	387	19.4	+5.1
Majority		456	22.9	+21.1
Turnout		1,991	37.8	–8.2
Registered electors		5,270		
Conservative hold		Swing	▲10.6	

=== Harpenden West ===
Harpenden West
Party	Candidate	Votes	%	±%
Conservative	H. Haynes	1,068	56.0	+7.4
Liberal Democrats	M. Skinner	536	28.1	–10.0
Labour	E. Rayner	303	15.9	+2.6
Majority		532	27.9	+17.4
Turnout		1,907	35.9	–9.0
Registered electors		5,326		
Conservative hold		Swing	▲8.7	

=== London Colney ===
London Colney
Party	Candidate	Votes	%	±%
Labour	M. Macmillan*	1,444	78.4	+3.6
Conservative	M. Shaw	224	12.2	+2.4
Liberal Democrats	K. Lambert	174	9.4	–1.8
Majority		1,220	66.2	+2.6
Turnout		1,842	31.7	–0.8
Registered electors		5,823		
Labour hold		Swing	▲0.6	

No Green candidate as previous (4.2%).

=== Marshallwick North ===
Marshallwick North
Party	Candidate	Votes	%	±%
Liberal Democrats	L. Hicks	945	49.9	–15.3
Conservative	J. Foster*	621	27.2	+8.5
Labour	J. Gibbs	526	23.1	+6.7
Majority		324	20.9	–18.4
Turnout		2,092	39.8	–2.8
Registered electors		4,763		
Liberal Democrats gain from Conservative		Swing	▼11.9	

=== Marshallwick South ===
Marshallwick South
Party	Candidate	Votes	%	±%
Liberal Democrats	J. Peters	1,134	49.7	–2.6
Conservative	J. Turner*	621	27.2	+0.8
Labour	R. Harris	526	23.1	+1.8
Majority		513	22.5	–3.5
Turnout		2,281	44.0	–1.7
Registered electors		5,185		
Liberal Democrats gain from Conservative		Swing	▼1.8	

=== Park Street ===
Park Street
Party	Candidate	Votes	%	±%
Liberal Democrats	S. Abidi	599	43.1	–12.3
Labour	M. Morley	441	31.7	+5.1
Conservative	G. Truelove	349	25.1	+7.2
Majority		158	11.4	–17.4
Turnout		1,389	31.1	–5.3
Registered electors		4,467		
Liberal Democrats gain from Conservative		Swing	▼8.7	

=== Redbourn ===
Redbourn
Party	Candidate	Votes	%	±%
Conservative	M. Corley*	747	44.7	+6.3
Liberal Democrats	P. Finigan	628	37.6	–4.2
Labour	D. Allan	295	17.7	–2.1
Majority		119	7.1	N/A
Turnout		1,670	37.7	–4.0
Registered electors		4,436		
Conservative hold		Swing	▲5.3	

=== Sopwell ===
Sopwell
Party	Candidate	Votes	%	±%
Labour	N. Portia-Harris	1,294	70.1	–5.9
Liberal Democrats	J. Hale	306	16.6	+3.7
Conservative	V. Holley	247	13.4	+2.4
Majority		988	53.5	–9.6
Turnout		1,847	35.7	–3.1
Registered electors		5,183		
Labour hold		Swing	▼4.8	

=== St. Peters ===
St. Peters
Party	Candidate	Votes	%	±%
Labour	L. Warren	940	45.6	+3.9
Liberal Democrats	R. Biddle*	921	44.7	–3.1
Conservative	G. Brown	200	9.7	–0.9
Majority		19	0.9	N/A
Turnout		2,061	41.4	–1.8
Registered electors		4,984		
Labour gain from Liberal Democrats		Swing	▲3.5	

=== St. Stephens ===
St. Stephens
Party	Candidate	Votes	%	±%
Liberal Democrats	B. Blackwell	948	40.9	–1.2
Conservative	G. Myland	823	35.5	+2.1
Labour	N. Williamson	546	23.6	–0.9
Majority		125	5.4	–3.3
Turnout		2,317	39.0	–1.1
Registered electors		6,047		
Liberal Democrats gain from Conservative		Swing	▼1.7	

=== Verulam ===
Verulam
Party	Candidate	Votes	%	±%
Liberal Democrats	M. Fearson	1,048	42.1	+3.2
Conservative	C. Whiteside	969	38.9	+0.8
Labour	P. Robinson	471	18.9	–2.5
Majority		79	3.2	+2.4
Turnout		2,488	47.9	–0.3
Registered electors		5,210		
Liberal Democrats gain from Conservative		Swing	▲1.2	

=== Wheathampstead ===
Wheathampstead
Party	Candidate	Votes	%	±%
Conservative	K. Stammers*	942	43.6	+8.8
Liberal Democrats	T. Reason	676	31.3	–10.6
Labour	P. Woodhams	543	25.1	+1.9
Majority		266	12.3	N/A
Turnout		2,161	45.8	+0.1
Registered electors		4,735		
Conservative hold		Swing	▲9.7	
