= 1996 Leicester City Council election =

1996 English local election

The 1996 Leicester City Council election took place on 2 May 1996 to elect members of Leicester City Council in England. This was on the same day as other local elections.

== Summary ==
1996 Leicester City Council election
Party	Seats	Gains	Losses	Net gain/loss	Seats %	Votes %	Votes	+/−
Labour	41			▼4	73.2	57.0	75,386	–2.0
Liberal Democrats	8			▲1	14.3	18.0	23,774	–0.5
Conservative	7			▲3	12.5	21.1	27,947	+2.5
Independent Labour	0			Steady	0.0	1.9	2,495	–0.1
Green	0			Steady	0.0	1.8	2,377	+0.1
Militant Labour	0			Steady	0.0	0.2	290	+0.1
UKIP	0			Steady	0.0	0.1	75	N/A
