= 1996 Worthing Borough Council election =

1996 English local election

- 2 May 1996

13 out of 36 seats to Worthing Borough Council 19 seats needed for a majority

	First party	Second party
Party	Liberal Democrats	Conservative
Last election	23 seats, 52.0%	13 seats, 34.1%
Seats won	8	5
Seats after	26	10
Seat change	▲3	▼3
Popular vote	12,327	11,680
Percentage	44.5%	42.2%
Swing	▼7.5%	▲8.1%
Council control before election
Liberal Democrats
Council control after election
Liberal Democrats

The 1996 Worthing Borough Council election took place on 2 May 1996 to elect members of Worthing Borough Council in West Sussex, England. This was on the same day as other local elections.

== Summary ==
=== Election result ===
1996 Worthing Borough Council election
Party	This election				Full council			This election		
Party	Candidates	Seats	Net	Seats %	Other	Total	Total %	Votes	Votes %	+/−
Liberal Democrats	{{{candidates}}}	8	▲3	61.5	18	26	72.2	12,327	44.5	–7.5
Conservative	{{{candidates}}}	5	▼3	38.5	5	10	27.8	11,680	42.2	+8.1
Labour	{{{candidates}}}	0	Steady	0.0	0	0	0.0	3,495	12.6	–0.5
Green	{{{candidates}}}	0	Steady	0.0	0	0	0.0	204	0.7	–0.1

== Ward results ==
=== Broadwater ===
Broadwater
Party	Candidate	Votes	%	±%
Liberal Democrats	B. McCluskie*	1,186	66.4	–2.3
Conservative	D. Lissenburg	343	19.2	+1.6
Labour	R. White	256	14.3	+0.6
Majority		843	47.2	–3.9
Turnout		1,785	27.9	–4.2
Registered electors		6,403		
Liberal Democrats hold		Swing	▼2.0	

=== Castle ===
Castle
Party	Candidate	Votes	%	±%
Liberal Democrats	G. Cornell*	839	40.5	–11.9
Conservative	A. Garrett	729	35.2	+12.2
Labour	J. Hammond	503	24.3	–0.3
Majority		110	5.3	–22.5
Turnout		2,071	34.4	–5.1
Registered electors		5,982		
Liberal Democrats hold		Swing	▼12.1	

=== Central ===
Central (2 seats due to by-election)
Party	Candidate	Votes	%
Liberal Democrats	M. Tucker*	920	52.9
Liberal Democrats	L. Millington-Pratt	892	51.3
Conservative	J. Livermore	545	31.3
Conservative	S. Shreeve	532	30.6
Labour	K. Smith	261	15.0
Turnout		1,739	30.9
Registered electors		5,629	
Liberal Democrats hold			
Liberal Democrats hold			

=== Durrington ===
Durrington
Party	Candidate	Votes	%	±%
Liberal Democrats	N. Bull	1,064	44.0	–14.5
Conservative	V. Sutton*	976	40.3	+13.0
Labour	K. Hammond	314	13.0	–1.1
Green	L. Colkett	66	2.7	N/A
Majority		88	3.6	–27.6
Turnout		2,420	31.7	–5.3
Registered electors		7,635		
Liberal Democrats gain from Conservative		Swing	▼13.8	

=== Gaisford ===
Gaisford
Party	Candidate	Votes	%	±%
Liberal Democrats	A. Price	967	46.5	–15.0
Conservative	S. Craghill	822	39.6	+15.3
Labour	J. Hurcombe	230	11.1	–0.5
Green	J. Baker	59	2.8	+0.2
Majority		145	7.0	–30.2
Turnout		2,078	32.6	–1.8
Registered electors		6,382		
Liberal Democrats gain from Conservative		Swing	▼15.2	

=== Goring ===
Goring
Party	Candidate	Votes	%	±%
Conservative	S. Waight*	1,778	64.0	+14.6
Liberal Democrats	J. McRurn-Stewart	757	27.3	–13.7
Labour	O. Rand	241	8.7	+0.4
Majority		1,021	36.8	+28.4
Turnout		2,776	41.1	–9.3
Registered electors		6,754		
Conservative hold		Swing	▲14.2	

=== Heene ===
Heene
Party	Candidate	Votes	%	±%
Conservative	J. Smith	1,124	57.6	+7.2
Liberal Democrats	J. Bennett	534	27.4	–5.6
Labour	S. Newman	292	15.0	+0.8
Majority		590	30.3	+12.9
Turnout		1,950	30.8	–6.2
Registered electors		6,355		
Conservative hold		Swing	▲6.4	

=== Marine ===
Marine
Party	Candidate	Votes	%	±%
Conservative	R. Aston-Dive	1,263	55.8	+9.2
Liberal Democrats	E. Halpin	630	27.8	–12.2
Labour	N. Michica	291	12.9	+1.9
Green	S. Colgate	79	3.5	+1.1
Majority		633	28.0	+21.5
Turnout		2,263	36.0	–9.4
Registered electors		6,291		
Conservative hold		Swing	▲10.7	

=== Offington ===
Offington
Party	Candidate	Votes	%	±%
Conservative	R. Green	1,372	51.1	+5.6
Liberal Democrats	D. Gibson	1,089	40.5	–6.1
Labour	J. Gardiner	226	8.4	+0.5
Majority		283	10.5	N/A
Turnout		2,687	43.7	–0.8
Registered electors		6,193		
Conservative hold		Swing	▲5.9	

=== Salvington ===
Salvington
Party	Candidate	Votes	%	±%
Conservative	A. Lynn*	1,214	47.6	+6.1
Liberal Democrats	J. Kasprowicz	1,070	41.9	–5.0
Labour	J. Wicks	268	10.5	–1.1
Majority		144	5.6	N/A
Turnout		2,552	39.6	–2.3
Registered electors		6,464		
Conservative hold		Swing	▲5.6	

=== Selden ===
Selden
Party	Candidate	Votes	%	±%
Liberal Democrats	R. Gibbins	1,046	53.9	–9.5
Conservative	T. Jackson	533	27.5	+6.0
Labour	T. Smith	361	18.6	+3.5
Majority		513	26.4	–15.5
Turnout		1,940	31.9	–3.1
Registered electors		6,091		
Liberal Democrats gain from Conservative		Swing	▼7.8	

=== Tarring ===
Tarring
Party	Candidate	Votes	%	±%
Liberal Democrats	E. Pitt*	1,333	65.5	–0.5
Conservative	M. Gleaves	449	22.1	+2.1
Labour	J. Parr	252	12.4	–1.6
Majority		884	43.5	–2.5
Turnout		2,034	31.3	–5.9
Registered electors		6,471		
Liberal Democrats hold		Swing	▼1.3	
