= 1996 Hertsmere Borough Council election =

Local election in England

- 2 May 1996

13 out of 39 seats to Hertsmere Borough Council 20 seats needed for a majority
- Registered: 46,540
- Turnout: 37.0% (▼4.4%)

	First party	Second party
Party	Labour	Conservative
Seats won	7	3
Seats after	22	8
Seat change	▲3	▼6
Popular vote	7,162	6,939
Percentage	41.6%	40.3%
Swing	▼15.9%	▲8.6%
	Third party	Fourth party
Party	Liberal Democrats	Independent
Seats won	3	0
Seats after	8	1
Seat change	▲3	Steady
Popular vote	2,839	275
Percentage	16.5%	1.6%
Swing	▲7.5%	▼0.2%
- Winner of each seat at the 1996 Hertsmere Borough Council election. Wards in white were not contested.
Control before election
No overall control
Control after election
Labour

The 1996 Hertsmere Borough Council election took place on 2 May 1996 to elect members of Hertsmere Borough Council in Hertfordshire, England. This was on the same day as other local elections.

== Summary ==
=== Election result ===
1996 Hertsmere Borough Council election
Party	This election				Full council			This election		
Party	Candidates	Seats	Net	Seats %	Other	Total	Total %	Votes	Votes %	+/−
Labour	{{{candidates}}}	7	▲3	53.8	15	22	56.4	7,162	41.6	–15.9
Conservative	{{{candidates}}}	3	▼6	23.1	5	8	20.5	6,936	40.3	+8.6
Liberal Democrats	{{{candidates}}}	3	▲3	23.1	5	8	20.5	2,839	16.5	+7.5
Independent	{{{candidates}}}	0	Steady	0.0	1	1	2.6	275	1.6	–0.2

== Ward results ==
Incumbent councillors standing for re-election are marked with an asterisk (*). Changes in seats do not take into account by-elections or defections.

=== Aldenham West ===
Aldenham West
Party	Candidate	Votes	%	±%
Conservative	J. Cowen	725	45.1	–1.0
Labour	P. Halsey*	709	44.1	–9.8
Liberal Democrats	R. Gill	172	10.7	N/A
Majority		16	1.0	N/A
Turnout		1,606	43.7	+2.1
Registered electors		3,679		
Conservative gain from Labour		Swing	▲4.4	

=== Cowley ===
Cowley
Party	Candidate	Votes	%	±%
Labour	S. Williams	914	80.3	–3.2
Conservative	P. Brew	224	19.7	+3.2
Majority		690	60.6	–6.4
Turnout		1,138	25.1	–6.2
Registered electors		4,600		
Labour hold		Swing	▼3.2	

=== Heath North ===
Heath North
Party	Candidate	Votes	%	±%
Liberal Democrats	L. Hodgson	844	53.8	–5.9
Conservative	J. Slade	520	33.1	+1.6
Labour	A. Lemon	205	13.1	+4.3
Majority		324	20.7	–7.5
Turnout		1,569	39.5	–8.5
Registered electors		3,993		
Liberal Democrats gain from Conservative		Swing	▼3.8	

=== Heath South ===
Heath South
Party	Candidate	Votes	%	±%
Conservative	P. Riches*	833	59.9	+7.2
Labour	D. Bearfield	311	22.4	+8.7
Liberal Democrats	P. Forsyth	247	17.8	–15.9
Majority		522	37.5	+18.5
Turnout		1,391	33.9	–5.0
Registered electors		4,116		
Conservative hold		Swing	▼0.8	

=== Hillside ===
Hillside
Party	Candidate	Votes	%	±%
Labour	J. Kentish*	766	77.8	–1.1
Conservative	D. McKee	219	22.2	+1.1
Majority		547	55.6	–2.2
Turnout		985	30.3	–3.7
Registered electors		3,241		
Labour hold		Swing	▼1.1	

=== Lyndhurst ===
Lyndhurst
Party	Candidate	Votes	%	±%
Labour	B. Kelly*	688	75.4	–1.7
Conservative	J. Kempton	225	24.6	+1.7
Majority		463	50.8	–3.4
Turnout		913	29.2	–4.5
Registered electors		3,079		
Labour hold		Swing	▼1.7	

=== Potters Bar Central ===
Potters Bar Central
Party	Candidate	Votes	%	±%
Labour	M. Brilliant	643	52.1	+19.3
Conservative	P. Spratt*	592	47.9	+8.8
Majority		51	4.1	N/A
Turnout		1,235	36.3	–10.7
Registered electors		3,426		
Labour gain from Conservative		Swing	▲5.3	

=== Potters Bar East ===
Potters Bar East
Party	Candidate	Votes	%	±%
Labour	S. Aldrich	946	53.4	+0.5
Conservative	H. Spratt	824	46.6	+12.0
Majority		122	6.9	–11.8
Turnout		1,770	39.0	–2.6
Registered electors		4,491		
Labour gain from Conservative		Swing	▼5.8	

=== Potters Bar North ===
Potters Bar North
Party	Candidate	Votes	%	±%
Conservative	J. Donne*	816	67.0	+39.0
Labour	M. Powell	402	33.0	+24.4
Majority		414	34.0	N/A
Turnout		1,218	35.8	–16.1
Registered electors		3,452		
Conservative hold		Swing	▲7.3	

=== Potters Bar South ===
Potters Bar South
Party	Candidate	Votes	%	±%
Labour	E. Carey	506	42.6	–0.5
Conservative	C. Calcutt	408	34.3	–4.4
Independent	D. Martin	275	23.1	N/A
Majority		98	8.2	+3.9
Turnout		1,189	46.1	–2.3
Registered electors		2,579		
Labour gain from Conservative		Swing	▲2.0	

=== Potters Bar West ===
Potters Bar West
Party	Candidate	Votes	%	±%
Labour	J. Heywood	613	44.2	–5.3
Conservative	J. Usher*	595	42.9	+8.1
Liberal Democrats	C. Dean	180	13.0	–2.7
Majority		18	1.3	–13.4
Turnout		1,388	43.1	–0.4
Registered electors		3,233		
Labour gain from Conservative		Swing	▼6.7	

=== St. James East ===
St. James East
Party	Candidate	Votes	%	±%
Liberal Democrats	T. Hucklesby	745	57.8	–5.9
Conservative	C. Keates*	340	26.4	+5.1
Labour	M. Reid	203	15.8	+0.8
Majority		405	31.4	–11.0
Turnout		1,288	41.8	–6.0
Registered electors		3,090		
Liberal Democrats gain from Conservative		Swing	▼5.5	

=== St. James West ===
St. James West
Party	Candidate	Votes	%	±%
Liberal Democrats	P. Page	651	42.8	–9.6
Conservative	A. Attwood*	615	40.4	+6.6
Labour	G. De Groot	256	16.8	+3.1
Majority		36	2.4	–16.2
Turnout		1,522	42.9	–3.4
Registered electors		3,561		
Liberal Democrats gain from Conservative		Swing	▼8.1	
