= 1996 Luton Borough Council election =

Local election in England

- 2 May 1996

All 48 seats to Luton Borough Council 25 seats needed for a majority

	First party	Second party	Third party
Party	Labour	Liberal Democrats	Conservative
Seats won	36	9	3
Seat change	▼1	Steady	▲1
Popular vote	59,233	26,874	26,929
Percentage	51.3%	23.3%	23.3%
Swing	▼4.4%	▲3.4%	▲1.4%
Control before election
Labour
Control after election
Labour

The 1996 Luton Borough Council election took place on 2 May 1996 to elect members of Luton Borough Council in Bedfordshire, England. This was on the same day as other local elections.

== Summary ==
=== Election result ===
1996 Luton Borough Council election
Party	Candidates	Seats	Gains	Losses	Net gain/loss	Seats %	Votes %	Votes	+/−
Labour	48	36	1	2	▼1	75.0	51.3	59,233	–4.4
Liberal Democrats	47	9	0	0	Steady	18.8	23.3	26,874	+3.4
Conservative	47	3	2	1	▲1	6.3	23.3	26,929	+1.4
Residents	10	0	0	0	Steady	0.0	1.4	1,619	N/A
Green	5	0	0	0	Steady	0.0	0.7	822	+0.2
UKIP	1	0	0	0	Steady	0.0	0.1	69	N/A

== Ward results ==
Incumbent councillors standing for re-election are marked with an asterisk (*). Changes in seats do not take into account by-elections or defections.

=== Biscot ===
Biscot (3 seats)
Party	Candidate	Votes	%	±%
Labour	R. Davis*	1,563	48.5	–11.2
Labour	M. Guha*	1,476	45.8	–13.3
Labour	N. White	1,387	43.1	–13.2
Liberal Democrats	S. Rahman	1,202	37.3	+28.6
Conservative	M. Riaz	789	24.5	+0.7
Conservative	M. Farid	532	16.5	+1.3
Conservative	K. Foord	428	13.3	N/A
Liberal Democrats	D. Malins	298	9.3	+1.7
Turnout		~3,221	38.5	–0.8
Registered electors		8,366		
Labour hold				
Labour hold				
Labour hold				

=== Bramingham ===
Bramingham (3 seats)
Party	Candidate	Votes	%	±%
Labour	M. Main*	1,169	43.4	–0.1
Labour	D. Worlding	1,097	40.7	+3.0
Labour	Q. Hussain	1,034	38.4	+3.2
Conservative	P. Glenister*	980	36.4	+0.3
Conservative	M. Punter	948	35.2	+0.9
Conservative	R. Dean	945	35.1	+3.1
Liberal Democrats	M. Lincoln	469	17.4	–0.3
Liberal Democrats	S. Rutstein	419	15.5	–1.0
Liberal Democrats	H. Siederer	389	14.4	+0.8
Residents	I. Brodie	86	3.2	–0.6
Residents	J. Burgoyne	62	2.3	–0.6
Residents	R. Mitchell	52	1.9	–0.6
Turnout		~2,695	28.2	–0.9
Registered electors		9,558		
Labour hold				
Labour hold				
Labour gain from Conservative				

=== Challney ===
Challney (3 seats)
Party	Candidate	Votes	%	±%
Labour	B. Devenish*	1,312	54.5	–4.2
Labour	D. Ramsey	1,283	53.3	–1.3
Labour	W. Akbar*	1,260	52.3	–0.9
Conservative	S. Khan	664	27.6	+2.2
Conservative	G. Campbell	659	27.4	+6.1
Conservative	H. Mason	613	25.5	+4.6
Liberal Democrats	D. Chapman	296	12.3	+1.0
Liberal Democrats	B. Lawrence	283	11.8	+1.4
Liberal Democrats	P. Duffy	229	9.5	–0.7
Turnout		~2,408	32.1	–4.2
Registered electors		7,501		
Labour hold				
Labour hold				
Labour hold				

=== Crawley ===
Crawley (3 seats)
Party	Candidate	Votes	%	±%
Liberal Democrats	D. Franks*	1,634	51.8	+4.0
Liberal Democrats	L. Patterson*	1,586	50.3	+6.4
Liberal Democrats	J. Felmingham*	1,572	49.9	+6.3
Labour	A. Speakman	1,156	36.7	–5.0
Labour	C. Knight	1,154	36.6	–4.7
Labour	B. Hester	1,137	36.1	–1.6
Conservative	N. Feerick	259	8.2	–0.7
Conservative	D. Lockstone	241	7.6	–0.2
Conservative	E. Williamson	236	7.5	N/A
Turnout		~3,152	40.5	+0.1
Registered electors		7,782		
Liberal Democrats hold				
Liberal Democrats hold				
Liberal Democrats hold				

=== Dallow ===
Dallow (3 seats)
Party	Candidate	Votes	%	±%
Labour	M. Ashraf*	1,557	78.0	–6.3
Labour	Z. Ahmed*	1,525	76.4	–6.6
Labour	D. Taylor*	1,493	74.8	–5.2
Conservative	P. Platt	257	12.9	+2.9
Liberal Democrats	C. Cason	235	11.8	+1.3
Conservative	M. Thomas	235	11.8	+2.8
Conservative	G. Victor	220	11.0	N/A
Liberal Democrats	R. Knape	161	8.1	+0.6
Liberal Democrats	M. Knape	160	8.0	+0.7
Green	J. French	142	7.1	N/A
Turnout		~1,995	32.0	–5.2
Registered electors		7,087		
Labour hold				
Labour hold				
Labour hold				

=== Farley ===
Farley (3 seats)
Party	Candidate	Votes	%	±%
Labour	L. McCowan*	1,494	72.6	–1.9
Labour	L. Merritt	1,443	70.2	–1.4
Labour	J. Boyle	1,431	69.6	+4.0
Conservative	G. Clarke	278	13.5	–1.3
Conservative	J. Williams	266	12.9	+1.5
Conservative	B. Doward	256	12.4	+1.6
Liberal Democrats	J. Bonner	176	8.6	–1.3
Liberal Democrats	M. Howes	166	8.1	–0.4
Liberal Democrats	I. Griggs	150	7.3	+1.0
UKIP	C. Lawman	69	3.4	N/A
Turnout		~2,057	30.3	–5.8
Registered electors		6,788		
Labour hold				
Labour hold				
Labour hold				

=== High Town ===
High Town (3 seats)
Party	Candidate	Votes	%	±%
Labour	H. Magill*	1,288	54.9	–0.2
Labour	Z. Moran*	1,249	53.3	+2.9
Labour	J. Thakoordin	1,058	45.1	–5.3
Conservative	G. Dillingham	586	25.0	+8.5
Conservative	S. Lister	580	24.7	+8.2
Conservative	S. Victor	546	23.3	+8.1
Liberal Democrats	J. Doyle	283	12.1	–4.0
Liberal Democrats	A. Skepelhorne	270	11.5	–4.2
Liberal Democrats	A. Strange	254	10.8	–4.0
Green	L. Bliss	209	8.9	+3.1
Residents	P. Darkins	150	6.4	N/A
Turnout		~2,345	32.4	–3.1
Registered electors		7,238		
Labour hold				
Labour hold				
Labour hold				

=== Icknield ===
Icknield (3 seats)
Party	Candidate	Votes	%	±%
Conservative	V. Dunnington*	1,653	50.3	+8.5
Conservative	A. Flint	1,557	47.3	+7.8
Conservative	D. Johnston	1,537	46.7	+7.5
Labour	A. Flegham*	1,279	38.9	–5.2
Labour	R. Sills	1,246	37.9	–6.1
Labour	R. Furness	1,244	37.8	–3.7
Liberal Democrats	A. Farrow	352	10.7	–1.4
Liberal Democrats	D. Hinkley	321	9.8	–1.4
Liberal Democrats	T. Keens	315	9.6	–1.3
Turnout		~3,289	36.1	±0.0
Registered electors		9,111		
Conservative hold				
Conservative gain from Labour				
Conservative gain from Labour				

=== Leagrave ===
Leagrave (3 seats)
Party	Candidate	Votes	%	±%
Labour	D. Patten*	1,271	57.5	–4.4
Labour	S. Roden*	1,189	53.8	–3.3
Labour	D. Stewart*	1,170	52.9	–3.9
Conservative	R. Burdett	581	26.3	–0.6
Conservative	J. Titmuss	560	25.3	+3.1
Conservative	J. Heredia	527	23.8	+3.7
Liberal Democrats	M. Lincoln	205	9.3	+2.8
Liberal Democrats	L. De-Groot	193	8.7	+2.2
Liberal Democrats	D. De-Groot	189	8.5	+2.5
Residents	M. Smith	117	5.3	N/A
Residents	C. Gough	81	3.7	N/A
Residents	E. Gough	74	3.3	N/A
Turnout		~2,212	28.4	–5.4
Registered electors		7,789		
Labour hold				
Labour hold				
Labour hold				

=== Lewsey ===
Lewsey (3 seats)
Party	Candidate	Votes	%	±%
Labour	M. Hand*	1,635	69.8	–0.4
Labour	T. Shaw*	1,619	69.1	+3.5
Labour	H. Simmons	1,504	64.2	+3.5
Conservative	M. Hall	362	15.5	+0.3
Conservative	G. Farrell	354	15.1	+0.9
Conservative	S. Harrison	351	15.0	+1.9
Liberal Democrats	C. Mead	217	9.3	–0.2
Liberal Democrats	J. Mead	206	8.8	–0.3
Liberal Democrats	M. Robinson	205	8.8	–0.1
Turnout		~2,342	26.9	–2.2
Registered electors		8,705		
Labour hold				
Labour hold				
Labour hold				

=== Limbury ===
Limbury (3 seats)
Party	Candidate	Votes	%	±%
Labour	N. Bullock*	1,289	55.0	+1.3
Labour	A. Greaves	1,241	53.0	+0.9
Labour	R. Harris*	1,203	51.4	+1.5
Conservative	D. Kennedy	502	21.4	+1.7
Conservative	P. O'Neil	477	20.4	+1.3
Residents	C. Brown	412	17.6	–0.4
Residents	L. Mitchell	299	12.8	–2.0
Residents	V. King	286	12.2	–1.4
Liberal Democrats	K. Duffy	181	7.7	–1.4
Conservative	M. Morris	169	7.2	–10.4
Liberal Democrats	P. Elmes	158	6.7	–0.4
Liberal Democrats	L. McColm	155	6.6	–0.5
Turnout		~2,342	33.2	–5.2
Registered electors		7,049		
Labour hold				
Labour hold				
Labour hold				

=== Putteridge ===
Putteridge (3 seats)
Party	Candidate	Votes	%	±%
Liberal Democrats	R. Davies*	2,481	61.2	+15.5
Liberal Democrats	P. Chapman*	2,373	58.5	+17.5
Liberal Democrats	R. Greenham*	2,309	57.0	+16.2
Conservative	J. Ashby	799	19.7	–7.8
Conservative	M. Bradley	796	19.6	–7.1
Conservative	J. Pemberton	755	18.6	–7.5
Labour	H. Heather	750	18.5	–7.0
Labour	W. Worlding	708	17.5	–6.9
Labour	S. Deb Gupta	668	16.5	–6.4
Turnout		~4,054	36.9	–0.6
Registered electors		10,987		
Liberal Democrats hold				
Liberal Democrats hold				
Liberal Democrats hold				

=== Saints ===
Saints (3 seats)
Party	Candidate	Votes	%	±%
Labour	M. Akhtar*	1,430	50.7	–3.8
Labour	A. Roden*	1,402	49.7	–3.1
Labour	R. Saleem*	1,391	49.3	–2.0
Conservative	M. Riaz	964	34.2	+6.7
Conservative	J. O'Neil	781	27.7	+8.5
Conservative	K. White	755	26.8	+7.6
Liberal Democrats	B. Murray	305	10.8	–1.3
Liberal Democrats	E. Hird	282	10.0	–1.2
Liberal Democrats	M. Pringle	274	9.7	–0.1
Turnout		~2,821	37.4	–2.6
Registered electors		7,542		
Labour hold				
Labour hold				
Labour hold				

=== South ===
South (3 seats)
Party	Candidate	Votes	%	±%
Labour	C. Pryer*	1,210	55.0	–1.9
Labour	T. Hoyle*	1,163	52.9	–3.2
Labour	B. Slessor*	1,112	50.6	±0.0
Conservative	S. Kenneally	568	25.8	–2.1
Conservative	B. Tipler	510	23.2	–4.5
Liberal Democrats	D. Shaw	192	8.7	+0.5
Liberal Democrats	W. Cole	187	8.5	+2.1
Green	M. Scheimann	170	7.7	–1.7
Liberal Democrats	D. Shaw	158	7.2	+1.0
Green	J. Blake	153	7.0	N/A
Green	S. Cain	148	6.7	N/A
Turnout		~2,199	25.0	–6.1
Registered electors		8,796		
Labour hold				
Labour hold				
Labour hold				

=== Stopsley ===
Stopsley (3 seats)
Party	Candidate	Votes	%	±%
Liberal Democrats	J. Davies*	1,762	63.5	+5.1
Liberal Democrats	M. Dolling*	1,591	57.3	+4.6
Liberal Democrats	J. Wates	1,536	55.3	+6.3
Labour	J. Davis	704	25.4	–5.6
Labour	B. Ellis	599	21.6	–5.4
Labour	L. Singh	565	20.4	–5.3
Conservative	J. Denis-Smith	367	13.2	–0.2
Conservative	M. Price	322	11.6	–1.0
Conservative	P. Price	310	11.2	–0.6
Turnout		~2,776	39.3	–5.0
Registered electors		7,064		
Liberal Democrats hold				
Liberal Democrats hold				
Liberal Democrats hold				

=== Sundon Park ===
Sundon Park (3 seats)
Party	Candidate	Votes	%	±%
Labour	W. Cooney*	1,417	70.5	–3.4
Labour	K. Gale*	1,329	66.1	–2.7
Labour	S. Knight*	1,329	66.1	–1.9
Conservative	R. Cartwright	345	17.2	+2.1
Conservative	D. Johnston	322	16.0	+1.0
Conservative	V. Lacey	321	16.0	+2.5
Liberal Democrats	Y. Edmunds	191	9.5	+1.8
Liberal Democrats	J. Varnals	159	7.9	+2.0
Liberal Democrats	M. Varnals	145	7.2	+1.7
Turnout		~2,011	27.6	–6.4
Registered electors		7,286		
Labour hold				
Labour hold				
Labour hold				
