= 1996 North Hertfordshire District Council election =

Council election in England

- 2 May 1996

18 of 50 seats on North Hertfordshire District Council 26 seats needed for a majority
	First party	Second party
	Lab	Con
Leader	David Kearns	F. John Smith
Party	Labour	Conservative
Seats before	21	22
Seats after	26	16
Seat change	▲5	▼5
	Third party	Fourth party
	LD	Ind
Leader	Ian Simpson
Party	Liberal Democrats	Independent
Seats before	6	1
Seats after	7	1
Seat change	▲1	Steady
Policy chairman before election
David Kearns
Labour
No overall control
Leader after election
David Kearns
Labour

The 1996 North Hertfordshire District Council election was held on 2 May 1996 at the same time as other local elections across England. There were 18 out of 50 seats on North Hertfordshire District Council up for election, being the usual third of the council plus a by-election in Hitchin Oughton ward.

The council had previously been under no overall control, being led by a Labour minority administration with some support from the Liberal Democrats. Labour gained five extra seats at the election, giving them a majority on the council for the first time in its history. The Labour leader, David Kearns, was given the title leader of the council after the election, confirming the position he had de facto held since May 1995 by virtue of being chairman of the policy and resources committee.

== Overall results ==
The overall results were as follows:

1996 North Hertfordshire District Council election
Party	This election			Full council			This election		
Party	Seats	Net	Seats %	Other	Total	Total %	Votes	Votes %	+/−
Labour	11	▲5	61.1	15	26	52.0	13,488	44.9	-0.7
Conservative	5	▼6	27.8	11	16	32.0	9,995	33.3	+6.3
Liberal Democrats	2	▲1	11.1	5	7	14.0	6,556	21.8	0.0

== Ward results ==
The results for each ward were as follows. An asterisk(*) indicates a sitting councillor standing for re-election.

Ashbrook ward
Party	Candidate	Votes	%	±%
Conservative	David John Barnard	646	57.1	−13.3
Labour	Edward Wallace	307	27.1	+7.9
Liberal Democrats	Elizabeth Lilian Upchurch	178	15.7	+5.4
Turnout			46.9	
Registered electors		2,431		
Conservative hold		Swing	-10.6	

Baldock ward
Party	Candidate	Votes	%	±%
Labour	Roger Miller McFall	1,085	43.5	−9.7
Conservative	Bernard Crow*	832	33.3	+1.5
Liberal Democrats	Graham Philip Tapp	578	23.2	+8.2
Turnout			34.1	
Registered electors		7,342		
Labour gain from Conservative		Swing	-5.6	

Cadwell ward
Party	Candidate	Votes	%	±%
Labour	Anne Sobek	466	53.6	+21.5
Conservative	Robert Michael Hughes	403	46.4	−21.5
Turnout			48.5	
Registered electors		1,807		
Labour gain from Conservative		Swing	+21.5	

Hitchin Bearton ward
Party	Candidate	Votes	%	±%
Labour	Judi Billing*	1,078	69.8	−2.0
Conservative	Barry West	286	18.5	+2.0
Liberal Democrats	Jonathan Victor Newham	180	11.7	0.0
Turnout			33.5	
Registered electors		4,623		
Labour hold		Swing	-2.0	

Hitchin Highbury ward
Party	Candidate	Votes	%	±%
Liberal Democrats	Richard Oliver Canning	910	41.3	−2.9
Conservative	Sylvia Frances Chapman	853	38.7	+7.1
Labour	Lesley Ann Hankin	440	20.0	−4.2
Turnout			43.5	
Registered electors		5,074		
Liberal Democrats gain from Conservative		Swing	-5.0	

Hitchin Oughton ward
Party	Candidate	Votes	%	±%
Labour	Joan Irene Kirby*	984	67.5	−9.0
Labour	Martin John Stears	893		
Liberal Democrats	Victoria Warwick	251	17.2	+5.9
Conservative	Nigel Kenneth Brook	222	15.2	+3.1
Turnout			33.3	
Registered electors		4,068		
Labour hold		Swing	-7.5	
Labour hold		Swing		

The by-election in Hitchin Oughton ward was triggered by the resignation of Labour councillor David Harbourne on 18 March 1996.

Hitchin Priory ward
Party	Candidate	Votes	%	±%
Conservative	Richard Arthur Charles Thake*	620	55.2	+14.1
Liberal Democrats	Geoffrey Palmer	274	24.4	+4.3
Labour	Christopher Peter Charles White	230	20.5	+4.4
Turnout			39.3	
Registered electors		2,869		
Conservative hold		Swing	+4.9	

Hitchin Walsworth ward
Party	Candidate	Votes	%	±%
Labour	John Philip Anthony Banks*	1,480	67.6	+21.7
Conservative	Bernard Frank James Lovewell	447	20.4	+12.8
Liberal Democrats	Jonathan Paul Heath	261	11.9	+7.3
Turnout			36.4	
Registered electors		6,020		
Labour hold		Swing	+4.5	

Knebworth ward
Party	Candidate	Votes	%	±%
Conservative	Margaret Amy Hilton*	756	50.1	−1.4
Labour	Timothy Liddy	754	49.9	+28.6
Turnout			44.4	
Registered electors		3,410		
Conservative hold		Swing	-15.0	

Letchworth East ward
Party	Candidate	Votes	%	±%
Labour	Lorna Rose Kercher*	1,181	64.0	−1.4
Conservative	Paul Antony Stockford	378	20.5	+2.1
Liberal Democrats	Martin Gammell	285	15.5	+1.0
Turnout			37.7	
Registered electors		4,891		
Labour hold		Swing	-1.8	

Letchworth Grange ward
Party	Candidate	Votes	%	±%
Labour	David Peter Kearns*	1,371	67.2	−4.5
Conservative	Stephen Edward Shaddick	415	20.3	+3.6
Liberal Democrats	Robin Julian Hall	255	12.5	+0.9
Turnout			40.1	
Registered electors		5,085		
Labour hold		Swing	-4.1	

Letchworth South East ward
Party	Candidate	Votes	%	±%
Labour	Jean Andrews	1,193	46.3	−4.8
Conservative	Pauline Marguerite Wood*	789	30.6	+7.8
Liberal Democrats	Jean Phyllis Leonard	597	23.1	−3.0
Turnout			41.6	
Registered electors		6,220		
Labour gain from Conservative		Swing	-6.3	

Letchworth South West ward
Party	Candidate	Votes	%	±%
Conservative	Lynda Ann Needham	1,021	42.5	+3.2
Liberal Democrats	Sally Margaret Jarvis (Sal Jarvis)	1,018	42.4	−2.2
Labour	Marion Elizabeth Watson-Blake	362	15.1	−1.0
Turnout			52.6	
Registered electors		4,565		
Conservative hold		Swing	+2.7	

Letchworth Wilbury ward
Party	Candidate	Votes	%	±%
Labour	Gary Thomas Grindal	928	58.7	+2.4
Conservative	Raymond Lawrence Shakespeare-Smith* (Ray Shakespeare-Smith)	421	26.6	+2.2
Liberal Democrats	Paul Francis Booton	231	14.6	−4.6
Turnout			36.7	
Registered electors		4,305		
Labour gain from Conservative		Swing	+0.1	

Royston East ward
Party	Candidate	Votes	%	±%
Conservative	Francis John Smith* (John Smith)	854	48.1	+4.5
Labour	Ken Prince	586	33.0	+8.4
Liberal Democrats	Caroline Elizabeth Coates	334	18.8	−12.9
Turnout			40.8	
Registered electors		4,347		
Conservative hold		Swing	-2.0	

Royston West ward
Party	Candidate	Votes	%	±%
Labour	Leslie Baker (Les Baker)	992	39.6	+5.9
Conservative	Jane Margaret Dwerryhouse-Spears	860	34.4	+2.8
Liberal Democrats	Frank Christopher East (Chris East)	651	26.0	−8.7
Turnout			39.3	
Registered electors		6,392		
Labour gain from Conservative		Swing	+1.6	

Weston ward
Party	Candidate	Votes	%	±%
Liberal Democrats	Stephen Kenneth Jarvis* (Steve Jarvis)	553	69.5	+17.8
Conservative	Jessica Christian Dorothy Thomson	192	24.1	−20.1
Labour	John Mann	51	6.4	+2.4
Turnout			64.4	
Registered electors		1,241		
Liberal Democrats hold		Swing	+19.0	

== Changes 1996–1998 ==
Letchworth Wilbury ward by election, 1 May 1997
Party	Candidate	Votes	%	±%
Labour	Andrew Milne	1,635	50.8	−8.0
Conservative	Jessica Thomson	1,025	31.8	+5.2
Liberal Democrats	Murray Turner	560	17.4	+2.8
Labour hold		Swing	-6.6	

The Letchworth Wilbury ward by-election was triggered by the death of Labour councillor David Evans.
