= 1996 Eastbourne Borough Council election =

1996 UK local government election

The 1996 Eastbourne Borough Council election took place on 2 May 1996 to elect members of Eastbourne Borough Council in East Sussex, England. One third of the council was up for election and the Liberal Democrats stayed in overall control of the council.

After the election, the composition of the council was:

- Liberal Democrats 22
- Conservative 8

== Election result ==
Overall turnout at the election was 36.35%, down from 40.03% in 1995.

Eastbourne local election result 1996
Party	Seats	Gains	Losses	Net gain/loss	Seats %	Votes %	Votes	+/−
Liberal Democrats	6				60.0	4	1	
Conservative	4		0		40.0			
Labour	0	0	0	0	0.0			
Independent	0	0	0	0	0.0			
Liberal	0	0	0	0	0.0			

== Ward results ==
Devonshire
Party	Candidate	Votes	%	±%
Liberal Democrats	Josephine Teso	795		
Conservative	Sheila Charlton	700		
Labour	Jacqueline Frisby	366		
Majority		95		
Turnout		1,864	34.3	
Liberal Democrats hold		Swing		

Downside
Party	Candidate	Votes	%	±%
Liberal Democrats	Robert Kirtley			
Conservative	Simon Herbert			
Labour	Gary Coe			
Majority		938	48.8	
Turnout		1,924	32.3	
Liberal Democrats hold		Swing		

Hampden Park
Party	Candidate	Votes	%	±%
Liberal Democrats	Michael Thompson			
Labour	Sharon Wentworth			
Conservative	George Mills			
Majority				
Turnout		1,743	28.7	
Liberal Democrats hold		Swing		

Langney
Party	Candidate	Votes	%	±%
Liberal Democrats	Lesley Morris			
Conservative	Linda Bicknell			
Labour	Eoin Fisher			
Turnout				
Liberal Democrats hold		Swing		

Meads
Party	Candidate	Votes	%	±%
Conservative	Mark Deschamps			
Liberal Democrats	Shirley Bloom			
Independent	Raymond Openshaw			
Majority		1,217	48.0	
Turnout		2,533	38.4	
Conservative hold		Swing		

Ocklynge
Party	Candidate	Votes	%	±%
Liberal Democrats	John Strivens			
Conservative	Derek Townsend			
Labour	Edward Parton			
Majority				
Turnout		2,049	37.1	
Liberal Democrats gain from Conservative		Swing		

Ratton
Party	Candidate	Votes	%	±%
Conservative	Michael Tunwell	1,308	46.1	
Liberal Democrats	Gary Potter	1,081	38.1	
Labour	John Breed	256	9.0	
Liberal	Mona-Theresia Williamson	187	6.6	
Majority		227	8.0	
Turnout		2,837	45.7	
Conservative hold		Swing		

Roselands
Party	Candidate	Votes	%	±%
Liberal Democrats	Leslie Mason			
Conservative	Andrew Jay			
Labour	Jeremy Cole			
Turnout				
Liberal Democrats hold		Swing		

St Anthony's
Party	Candidate	Votes	%	±%
Conservative	Margo Smith			
Liberal Democrats	Hedley Marshall			
Labour	Robert Rossetter			
Majority				
Turnout		2,621	33.8	
Conservative gain from Liberal Democrats		Swing		

Upperton
Party	Candidate	Votes	%	±%
Conservative	Ann Murray			
Liberal Democrats	Madeleine Greenaway			
Labour	Steve Wallis			
Majority				
Turnout				
Conservative gain from Liberal Democrats		Swing		

== By-elections between 1996 and 1998 ==
A by-election was held on 20 June 1996 in Devonshire ward after the resignation of Darin Scott. Conservative Sheila Charlton gained the seat from the Liberal Democrats.

Devonshire by-election 1996
Party	Candidate	Votes	%	±%
Conservative	Sheila Charlton	654		
Liberal Democrats	Madeleine Greenaway	626		
Labour	Jacqueline Frisby	320		
Majority		38		
Turnout		1,600	29.3	
Conservative gain from Liberal Democrats		Swing		

A by-election was held on 5 December 1996 in Langney ward after the resignation of Alan Shuttleworth. Gary Potter held the seat for the Liberal Democrats.

Langney by-election 5 December 1996
Party	Candidate	Votes	%	±%
Liberal Democrats	Gary Potter	1,160		
Conservative	Leonard Meladio	419		
Labour	Steve Wallis	259		
Majority		741		
Turnout		1,794	18.8	
Liberal Democrats hold		Swing		

A by-election was held on 28 August 1997 in Langney ward after the resignation of Paul Heasman. Gary Potter held the seat for the Liberal Democrats.

Langney by-election 28 August 1997
Party	Candidate	Votes	%	±%
Liberal Democrats	Richard McMahon	914		
Conservative	Patrick Warner	470		
Labour	Steve Wallis	164		
Majority		444		
Turnout		1,548	15.73	
Liberal Democrats hold		Swing		
