= 1996 Newcastle City Council election =

1996 UK local government election

The 1996 Newcastle City Council election was held in May 1996. The Conservative Party was wiped out, the Liberal Democrats remained the Opposition and Labour slightly increased their majority.

| Party | Seats | | | Council Composition May 1996 |
| Party | 1994 | 1995 | 1996 | Council Composition May 1996 |
|---|---|---|---|---|
| Labour | 60 | 63 | 65 | |
| Liberal Democrats | 11 | 13 | 13 | |

== Results summary ==
1996 Newcastle City Council elections
| Party | This election | | | Full council | | | This election | | |
| Party | Seats | Net | Seats % | Other | Total | Total % | Votes | Votes % | +/− |
|---|---|---|---|---|---|---|---|---|---|
| Labour | 23 | ▲2 | 82.1 | 42 | 65 | 83.3 | 38,679 | 58.3 | |
| Liberal Democrats | 5 | Steady | 17.9 | 8 | 13 | 16.7 | 16,774 | 25.3 | |
| Conservative | 0 | ▼2 | 0.0 | 0 | 0 | 0.0 | 9,665 | 14.6 | |
| Green | 0 | Steady | 0.0 | 0 | 0 | 0.0 | 861 | 1.3 | |
| Independent Labour | 0 | Steady | 0.0 | 0 | 0 | 0.0 | 169 | 0.3 | |
| Militant Labour | 0 | New | 0.0 | 0 | 0 | 0.0 | 111 | 0.2 | New |
| Communist | 0 | Steady | 0.0 | 0 | 0 | 0.0 | 49 | 0.1 | |

== Ward results ==
=== Benwell ===
Benwell (1 seat)
| Party | Candidate | Votes | % | ±% |
|---|---|---|---|---|
| Labour | M. Montgomery | 974 | 74.4 | |
| Conservative | M. Easton | 213 | 16.3 | |
| Liberal Democrats | P. Lower | 123 | 9.4 | |
| Majority | | 761 | 58.1 | |
| Total valid votes | | 1,310 | 21.7 | |
| Registered electors | | 6,042 | | |
| Labour hold | | Swing | | |

=== Blakelaw ===
Blakelaw (1 seat)
| Party | Candidate | Votes | % | ±% |
|---|---|---|---|---|
| Liberal Democrats | A. Lower* | 2,061 | 53.8 | |
| Labour | F. Copley | 1,667 | 43.5 | |
| Conservative | H. Turner | 104 | 2.7 | |
| Majority | | 394 | 10.3 | |
| Total valid votes | | 3,832 | 41.4 | |
| Registered electors | | 9,259 | | |
| Liberal Democrats hold | | Swing | | |

=== Byker ===
Byker (1 seat)
| Party | Candidate | Votes | % | ±% |
|---|---|---|---|---|
| Labour | T. Marr* | 1,344 | 84.2 | |
| Liberal Democrats | T. Thompson | 156 | 9.8 | |
| Conservative | F. Goodenough | 96 | 6.0 | |
| Majority | | 1,188 | 74.4 | |
| Total valid votes | | 1,596 | 22.7 | |
| Registered electors | | 7,036 | | |
| Labour hold | | Swing | | |

=== Castle ===
Castle (1 seat)
| Party | Candidate | Votes | % | ±% |
|---|---|---|---|---|
| Liberal Democrats | M. De Vere* | 2,092 | 59.2 | |
| Labour | D. Wright | 1,024 | 29.0 | |
| Conservative | E. Graham | 419 | 11.9 | |
| Majority | | 1,068 | 30.2 | |
| Total valid votes | | 3,535 | 39.5 | |
| Registered electors | | 8,947 | | |
| Liberal Democrats hold | | Swing | | |

=== Dene ===
Dene (1 seat)
| Party | Candidate | Votes | % | ±% |
|---|---|---|---|---|
| Liberal Democrats | W. Taylor* | 2,670 | 54.4 | |
| Labour | L. Marsden | 1,624 | 33.1 | |
| Conservative | J. Middleton | 613 | 12.5 | |
| Majority | | 1,046 | 21.3 | |
| Total valid votes | | 4,907 | 45.2 | |
| Registered electors | | 10,846 | | |
| Liberal Democrats hold | | Swing | | |

=== Denton ===
Denton (1 seat)
| Party | Candidate | Votes | % | ±% |
|---|---|---|---|---|
| Labour | J. White | 1,608 | 80.4 | |
| Liberal Democrats | D. Faulkner | 391 | 19.6 | |
| Majority | | 1,217 | 60.9 | |
| Total valid votes | | 1,999 | 24.6 | |
| Registered electors | | 8,113 | | |
| Labour hold | | Swing | | |

=== Elswick ===
Elswick (1 seat)
| Party | Candidate | Votes | % | ±% |
|---|---|---|---|---|
| Labour | N. Todd* | 1,000 | 78.2 | |
| Conservative | L. Elswick | 147 | 11.5 | |
| Liberal Democrats | S. Mansfield | 131 | 10.3 | |
| Majority | | 853 | 66.7 | |
| Total valid votes | | 1,278 | 20.5 | |
| Registered electors | | 6,240 | | |
| Labour hold | | Swing | | |

=== Fawdon ===
Fawdon (1 seat)
| Party | Candidate | Votes | % | ±% |
|---|---|---|---|---|
| Labour | T. Flynn* | 1,838 | 74.8 | |
| Liberal Democrats | L. Rozner | 372 | 15.1 | |
| Conservative | J. Stepney | 247 | 10.1 | |
| Majority | | 1,466 | 59.7 | |
| Total valid votes | | 2,457 | 32.4 | |
| Registered electors | | 7,574 | | |
| Labour hold | | Swing | | |

=== Fenham ===
Fenham (1 seat)
| Party | Candidate | Votes | % | ±% |
|---|---|---|---|---|
| Labour | I. Cooney | 1,769 | 70.1 | |
| Conservative | P. Oliver | 503 | 19.9 | |
| Liberal Democrats | C. Schardt | 251 | 9.9 | |
| Majority | | 1,266 | 50.2 | |
| Total valid votes | | 2,523 | 30.0 | |
| Registered electors | | 8,414 | | |
| Labour hold | | Swing | | |

=== Grange ===
Grange (1 seat)
| Party | Candidate | Votes | % | ±% |
|---|---|---|---|---|
| Liberal Democrats | D. Packham* | 2,159 | 62.3 | |
| Labour | M. Lydon | 870 | 25.1 | |
| Conservative | E. McQueen | 355 | 10.2 | |
| Green | B. Lukey | 81 | 2.3 | |
| Majority | | 1,289 | 37.2 | |
| Total valid votes | | 3,465 | 35.1 | |
| Registered electors | | 9,884 | | |
| Liberal Democrats hold | | Swing | | |

=== Heaton ===
Heaton (1 seat)
| Party | Candidate | Votes | % | ±% |
|---|---|---|---|---|
| Labour | W. Dodds* | 1,674 | 63.6 | |
| Conservative | E. Harding | 362 | 13.8 | |
| Liberal Democrats | N. Brooks | 270 | 10.3 | |
| Independent Labour | B. Carpenter | 169 | 6.4 | |
| Green | C. Hayday | 157 | 6.0 | |
| Majority | | 1,312 | 49.8 | |
| Total valid votes | | 2,632 | 28.4 | |
| Registered electors | | 9,266 | | |
| Labour hold | | Swing | | |

=== Jesmond ===
Jesmond (1 seat)
| Party | Candidate | Votes | % | ±% |
|---|---|---|---|---|
| Labour | H. Franks | 1,550 | 42.6 | |
| Conservative | C. Dempsey | 1,171 | 32.2 | |
| Liberal Democrats | P. Elliot | 792 | 21.8 | |
| Green | D. Alliband | 123 | 3.4 | |
| Majority | | 379 | 10.4 | |
| Total valid votes | | 3,636 | 35.5 | |
| Registered electors | | 10,241 | | |
| Labour gain from Conservative | | Swing | | |

=== Kenton ===
Kenton (1 seat)
| Party | Candidate | Votes | % | ±% |
|---|---|---|---|---|
| Labour | G. Bell | 1,914 | 65.6 | |
| Conservative | E. Hannaford* | 751 | 25.8 | |
| Liberal Democrats | D. Besag | 251 | 8.6 | |
| Majority | | 1,163 | 39.9 | |
| Total valid votes | | 2,916 | 36.8 | |
| Registered electors | | 7,915 | | |
| Labour gain from Conservative | | Swing | | |

=== Lemington ===
Lemington (1 seat)
| Party | Candidate | Votes | % | ±% |
|---|---|---|---|---|
| Labour | R. Robson* | 1,415 | 77.2 | |
| Liberal Democrats | M. Coulthard | 226 | 12.3 | |
| Conservative | J. McKie | 191 | 10.4 | |
| Majority | | 1,189 | 64.9 | |
| Total valid votes | | 1,832 | 23.2 | |
| Registered electors | | 7,900 | | |
| Labour hold | | Swing | | |

=== Monkchester ===
Monkchester (1 seat)
| Party | Candidate | Votes | % | ±% |
|---|---|---|---|---|
| Labour | N. Povey* | 1,434 | 87.5 | |
| Liberal Democrats | J. Mansfield | 116 | 7.1 | |
| Conservative | G. Clark | 88 | 5.4 | |
| Majority | | 1,318 | 80.5 | |
| Total valid votes | | 1,638 | 25.2 | |
| Registered electors | | 6,503 | | |
| Labour hold | | Swing | | |

=== Moorside ===
Moorside (2 seats)
| Party | Candidate | Votes | % | ±% |
|---|---|---|---|---|
| Labour | I. Kirkham | 1,191 | 61.6 | |
| Labour | G. O'Brien* | 1,134 | | |
| Conservative | M. Blenkinsop | 300 | 15.5 | |
| Liberal Democrats | A. Routhwaite | 272 | 14.1 | |
| Green | P. Hilton | 172 | 8.9 | |
| Green | J. Nicholson | 168 | | |
| Majority | | 891 | 46.0 | |
| Total valid votes | | | 19.1 | |
| Registered electors | | 8,502 | | |
| Labour hold | | Swing | | |
| Labour hold | | Swing | | |

=== Newburn ===
Newburn (1 seat)
| Party | Candidate | Votes | % | ±% |
|---|---|---|---|---|
| Labour | R. Brown* | 1,511 | 81.1 | |
| Liberal Democrats | B. Wilmot | 199 | 10.7 | |
| Conservative | S. McKie | 154 | 8.3 | |
| Majority | | 1,312 | 70.4 | |
| Total valid votes | | 1,864 | 26.1 | |
| Registered electors | | 7,136 | | |
| Labour hold | | Swing | | |

=== Sandyford ===
Sandyford (1 seat)
| Party | Candidate | Votes | % | ±% |
|---|---|---|---|---|
| Labour | T. Nesbit* | 1,773 | 70.9 | |
| Conservative | J. Wardle | 295 | 11.8 | |
| Liberal Democrats | K. Murphy | 272 | 10.9 | |
| Green | D. Shepherdson | 160 | 6.4 | |
| Majority | | 1,478 | 59.1 | |
| Total valid votes | | 2,500 | 27.3 | |
| Registered electors | | 9,142 | | |
| Labour hold | | Swing | | |

=== Scotswood ===
Scotswood (1 seat)
| Party | Candidate | Votes | % | ±% |
|---|---|---|---|---|
| Labour | J. Lamb* | 904 | 74.7 | |
| Militant Labour | K. Hattam | 111 | 9.2 | |
| Liberal Democrats | C. Packham | 105 | 8.7 | |
| Conservative | D. Grant | 90 | 7.4 | |
| Majority | | 793 | 65.5 | |
| Total valid votes | | 1,210 | 23.1 | |
| Registered electors | | 5,249 | | |
| Labour hold | | Swing | | |

=== South Gosforth ===
South Gosforth (1 seat)
| Party | Candidate | Votes | % | ±% |
|---|---|---|---|---|
| Liberal Democrats | L. Opik* | 2,525 | 58.7 | |
| Conservative | M. Summersby | 1,342 | 31.2 | |
| Labour | M. Scott | 433 | 10.1 | |
| Majority | | 1,183 | 27.5 | |
| Total valid votes | | 4,300 | 51.1 | |
| Registered electors | | 8,418 | | |
| Liberal Democrats hold | | Swing | | |

=== Walker ===
Walker (1 seat)
| Party | Candidate | Votes | % | ±% |
|---|---|---|---|---|
| Labour | D. Wood* | 1,261 | 86.8 | |
| Liberal Democrats | D. Cain | 119 | 8.2 | |
| Conservative | A. Barnes | 73 | 5.0 | |
| Majority | | 1,142 | 78.6 | |
| Total valid votes | | 1,453 | 23.2 | |
| Registered electors | | 6,270 | | |
| Labour hold | | Swing | | |

=== Walkergate ===
Walkergate (1 seat)
| Party | Candidate | Votes | % | ±% |
|---|---|---|---|---|
| Labour | B. Rice* | 1,644 | 76.4 | |
| Liberal Democrats | H. St. Clair | 275 | 12.8 | |
| Conservative | A. Gingell | 233 | 10.8 | |
| Majority | | 1,369 | 63.6 | |
| Total valid votes | | 2,152 | 26.9 | |
| Registered electors | | 8,012 | | |
| Labour hold | | Swing | | |

=== West City ===
West City (1 seat)
| Party | Candidate | Votes | % | ±% |
|---|---|---|---|---|
| Labour | D. Malcolm | 827 | 79.5 | |
| Conservative | M. Kelly | 91 | 8.8 | |
| Liberal Democrats | I. Morgan | 73 | 7.0 | |
| Communist | M. Levy | 49 | 4.7 | |
| Majority | | 736 | 70.8 | |
| Total valid votes | | 1,040 | 18.6 | |
| Registered electors | | 5,597 | | |
| Labour hold | | Swing | | |

=== Westerhope ===
Westerhope (1 seat)
| Party | Candidate | Votes | % | ±% |
|---|---|---|---|---|
| Labour | R. Morgan* | 2,090 | 68.4 | |
| Conservative | F. Kirkby | 634 | 20.8 | |
| Liberal Democrats | G. Horey | 330 | 10.8 | |
| Majority | | 1,456 | 47.7 | |
| Total valid votes | | 3,054 | 29.3 | |
| Registered electors | | 10,436 | | |
| Labour hold | | Swing | | |

=== Wingrove ===
Wingrove (2 seats)
| Party | Candidate | Votes | % | ±% |
|---|---|---|---|---|
| Labour | J. McCarty* | 1,577 | 63.6 | |
| Labour | Z. Khan | 1,521 | | |
| Conservative | M. Elliott | 551 | 22.2 | |
| Conservative | J. Henry | 469 | | |
| Liberal Democrats | J. Lawson | 352 | 14.2 | |
| Majority | | 1,026 | 41.4 | |
| Total valid votes | | | 26.8 | |
| Registered electors | | 8,342 | | |
| Labour hold | | Swing | | |
| Labour hold | | Swing | | |

=== Woolingston ===
Woolingston (1 seat)
| Party | Candidate | Votes | % | ±% |
|---|---|---|---|---|
| Labour | R. Robson* | 1,108 | 75.3 | |
| Liberal Democrats | K. O'Neill | 191 | 13.0 | |
| Conservative | P. Owers | 173 | 11.8 | |
| Majority | | 917 | 62.3 | |
| Total valid votes | | 1,472 | 24.6 | |
| Registered electors | | 5,984 | | |
| Labour hold | | Swing | | |
