= 1996 Bolton Metropolitan Borough Council election =

1996 UK local government election

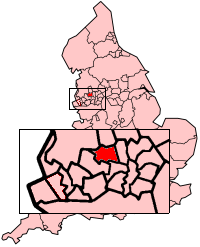
The Metropolitan Borough of Bolton shown within England.

The 1996 Bolton Metropolitan Borough Council election took place on 2 May 1996 to elect members of Bolton Metropolitan Borough Council in Greater Manchester, England. One third of the council was up for election and the Labour Party kept overall control of the council

20 seats were contested in the election, with 16 being won by the Labour Party, 2 by the Liberal Democrats and 2 by the Conservatives.

After the election, the composition of the council was:

- Labour 48
- Conservative 6
- Liberal Democrat 6

== Election results ==
Bolton local election result 1996
Party	Seats	Gains	Losses	Net gain/loss	Seats %	Votes %	Votes	+/−
Labour	16	5	0	+5		54.1	36,393	-0.5
Conservative	2	0	5	-5		25.0	16,798	+1.7
Liberal Democrats	2	0	0	0		19.6	13,184	-0.4

== Council Composition ==
Prior to the election the composition of the council was:

↓
43	11	6
Labour	Conservative	L

After the election the composition of the council was:

↓
48	6	6
Labour	Conservative	L

LD – Liberal Democrats

== Ward results ==
=== Astley Bridge ward ===
Astley Bridge ward
Party	Candidate	Votes	%	±%
Labour	B Ramsden	1,954	45.6	−3.9
Conservative	H Fairclough	1,899	44.3	+6.4
Liberal Democrats	S Howarth	429	10.0	+4.2
Majority		55	1.3	−10.3
Turnout		4,282	39.3	−4.7
Labour gain from Conservative		Swing	Labour to Con 5.1	

=== Blackrod ward ===
Blackrod ward
Party	Candidate	Votes	%	±%
Labour	E Johnson	1,589	43.1	−20.8
Independent Labour	L Watkinson	842	22.9	+22.9
Conservative	C Moss	824	22.4	+0.6
Liberal Democrats	D Watts	428	11.6	−2.7
Majority		747	20.3	−21.8
Turnout		3,683	37.1	+1.0
Labour hold		Swing	Labour to Ind Lab 21.8	

=== Bradshaw ward ===
Bradshaw ward
Party	Candidate	Votes	%	±%
Labour	G Butterworth	1,782	48.1	−1.1
Conservative	W Hall	1,492	40.3	−0.8
Liberal Democrats	I Peacock	432	11.7	+2.0
Majority		290	7.8	−0.3
Turnout		3,706	34.1	−3.5
Labour gain from Conservative		Swing	Labour to LD 1.5	

=== Breightmet ward ===
Breightmet ward
Party	Candidate	Votes	%	±%
Labour	J Byrne	2,134	72.6	−0.4
Conservative	P Brown	491	16.7	+1.1
Liberal Democrats	E Hill	315	10.7	−0.8
Majority		1,643	55.9	−1.5
Turnout		2,940	28.5	−1.4
Labour hold		Swing	Con to LD 0.9	

=== Bromley Cross ward ===
Bromley Cross ward
Party	Candidate	Votes	%	±%
Conservative	N Critchley	2,072	48.5	+1.7
Labour	R McCawley	1,778	41.7	−0.3
Liberal Democrats	C Atty	418	9.8	−1.3
Majority		294	6.8	+2.0
Turnout		4,268	40.7	+0.8
Conservative hold		Swing	LD to Con 1.5	

=== Burnden ward ===
Burnden ward
Party	Candidate	Votes	%	±%
Labour	D Eastwood	1,907	70.0	−5.0
Conservative	R Wood	425	15.6	+1.7
Liberal Democrats	D Connor	394	14.5	+3.4
Majority		1,482	54.4	−6.8
Turnout		2,726	28.4	−2.5
Labour hold		Swing	Labour to LD 4.2	

=== Central ward ===
Central ward
Party	Candidate	Votes	%	±%
Labour	R Howarth	2,052	77.6	+0.3
Conservative	J Bradley	447	16.9	+0.7
Liberal Democrats	R Silvester	146	5.5	−0.9
Majority		1,605	60.7	−0.4
Turnout		2,645	34.0	−3.7
Labour hold		Swing	LD to Con 0.7	

=== Daubhill ward ===
Daubhill ward
Party	Candidate	Votes	%	±%
Labour	T Anderton	2,024	76.9	+1.7
Conservative	F Tebbutt	383	14.5	−0.7
Liberal Democrats	M Rothwell	226	8.6	−1.0
Majority		1,641	62.4	+2.4
Turnout		2,633	30.4	−1.9
Labour hold		Swing	LD to Labour 1.3	

=== Deane-cum-Heaton ward ===
Deane-cum-Heaton ward
Party	Candidate	Votes	%	±%
Conservative	A Rushton	2,383	48.6	−4.2
Labour	E Walker	1,877	38.3	+38.3
Liberal Democrats	C Gregory	640	13.1	−34.1
Majority		506	10.3	+4.7
Turnout		4,900	37.3	−3.4
Conservative hold		Swing	LD to Labour 36.2	

=== Derby ward ===
Derby ward
Party	Candidate	Votes	%	±%
Labour	J Foster	2,604	83.8	+10.3
Conservative	J Walsh	319	10.3	−12.0
Liberal Democrats	L Bale	186	6.0	+1.8
Majority		2,285	73.5	+22.3
Turnout		3,109	33.6	−7.6
Labour hold		Swing	Con to Labour 11.1	

=== Farnworth ward ===
Farnworth ward
Party	Candidate	Votes	%	±%
Labour	N Spencer	1,874	82.0	+28.6
Conservative	D Bailey	208	9.1	+1.9
Liberal Democrats	W Crook	204	8.9	+4.9
Majority		1,666	72.9	+54.8
Turnout		2,286	24.3	−6.1
Labour hold		Swing		

=== Halliwell ward ===
Halliwell ward
Party	Candidate	Votes	%	±%
Labour	L Thomas	1,919	66.8	+0.1
Liberal Democrats	I Greenhalgh	572	19.9	−3.2
Conservative	A Osborn	382	13.3	+3.1
Majority		1,347	46.9	+3.3
Turnout		2,873	30.0	−5.9
Labour hold		Swing	LD to Con 3.1	

=== Harper Green ward ===
Harper Green ward
Party	Candidate	Votes	%	±%
Labour	M Clare	1,862	78.7	−1.8
Conservative	K Ward	297	12.6	+1.8
Liberal Democrats	R Harasiwka	206	8.7	0.0
Majority		1,565	66.2	−3.4
Turnout		2,365	23.4	−4.4
Labour hold		Swing	Labour to Con 1.8	

=== Horwich ward ===
Horwich ward
Party	Candidate	Votes	%	±%
Liberal Democrats	B Ronson	2,837	58.4	+29.3
Labour	I Alli	1,105	22.7	−25.4
Conservative	P Barron	917	18.9	−2.3
Majority		1,732	35.7	
Turnout		4,859	43.0	−0.5
Liberal Democrats hold		Swing	Labour to LD 27.3	

=== Hulton Park ward ===
Hulton Park ward
Party	Candidate	Votes	%	±%
Labour	J Kellett	1,677	41.9	−2.7
Conservative	C Higson	1,411	35.3	+8.3
Liberal Democrats	D Gradwell	911	22.8	−4.1
Majority		266	6.6	−11.0
Turnout		3,999	33.5	−1.7
Labour gain from Conservative		Swing	LD to Con 6.2	

=== Kearsley ward ===
Kearsley ward
Party	Candidate	Votes	%	±%
Labour	D Burrows	1,847	61.7	+3.1
Liberal Democrats	J Rothwell	956	31.9	−4.5
Conservative	A Bonomy	191	6.4	−1.4
Majority		891	29.8	
Turnout		2,994	30.1	−4.7
Labour hold		Swing	LD to Labour 3.8	

=== Little Lever ward ===
Little Lever ward
Party	Candidate	Votes	%	±%
Labour	M Connell	2,117	61.9	+5.6
Conservative	S Jinks	1,078	31.5	−5.7
Liberal Democrats	L Barron	227	6.6	+0.1
Majority		1,039	30.4	+11.4
Turnout		3,422	36.7	−3.8
Labour gain from Conservative		Swing	Con to Labour 5.6	

=== Smithills ward ===
Smithills ward
Party	Candidate	Votes	%	±%
Liberal Democrats	C Sawrbrick	2,088	56.1	−3.1
Labour	A Page	885	23.8	−3.5
Conservative	J Walsh	746	20.1	+6.6
Majority		1,203	32.3	+0.4
Turnout		3,719	43.9	−0.4
Liberal Democrats hold		Swing	Labour to Con 5.0	

=== Tonge ward ===
Tonge ward
Party	Candidate	Votes	%	±%
Labour	M Mcfadden	1,913	70.2	−1.1
Conservative	J Evans	535	19.6	+0.1
Liberal Democrats	P Howarth	277	10.2	+0.9
Majority		1,378	50.6	−1.2
Turnout		2,725	33.6	−5.2
Labour hold		Swing	Labour to LD 1.0	

=== Westhoughton ward ===
Westhoughton ward
Party	Candidate	Votes	%	±%
Labour	K Jones	1,493	48.4	+3.7
Liberal Democrats	E Hill	1,296	42.0	+4.3
Conservative	D Bagnall	298	9.7	−1.6
Majority		197	6.4	−0.6
Turnout		3,087	36.8	−1.3
Labour gain from Conservative		Swing	Con to LD 2.3	
