= 1996 Hyndburn Borough Council election =

1996 UK local government election

Elections to Hyndburn Council (Lancashire, England) were held on 5 May 1996. One third of the council was up for election.
