= 1996 Huntingdonshire District Council election =

1996 UK local government election

The 1996 Huntingdonshire District Council election took place on 2 May 1996 to elect members of Huntingdonshire District Council in Cambridgeshire, England. One third of the council was up for election and the Conservative Party stayed in overall control of the council. These seats were last contested in the 1992 United Kingdom local elections.

== Ward results ==
Brampton
Party	Candidate	Votes	%	±%
Conservative	Stephen Jennis	770	58.4	−2.2
Liberal Democrats	Robert Hulstrom	323	24.5	+16.8
Labour	Ivan Mahon	222	16.8	+11.3
Majority		447	33.9	−1.1
Turnout		1,318	42.1	+3.3
Conservative hold		Swing		

Earith
Party	Candidate	Votes	%	±%
Liberal Democrats	Joyce James	575	55.1	+26.5
Conservative	Jane Clapinska	460	44.1	−20.4
Majority		115	11.0	−25.0
Turnout		1043	34.9	+1.8
Liberal Democrats gain from Conservative		Swing		

Godmanchester
Party	Candidate	Votes	%	±%
Conservative	Robert Hughes	946	55.3	−11.3
Liberal Democrats	Beryl Moore	497	29.0	+10.9
Labour	Thelma Lomax	265	15.5	+2.8
Majority		449	26.3	−22.2
Turnout		1,712	41.2	+11.3
Conservative hold		Swing		

Hemingford Abbots and Hilton
Party	Candidate	Votes	%	±%
Conservative	Ian Bates	440	59.5	−19.3
Liberal Democrats	Mark Rainer	216	29.2	+16.4
Labour	Grace Adams	79	10.7	+2.3
Majority		224	30.3	−35.7
Turnout		739	61.4	+12.5
Conservative hold		Swing		
