= 1996 Broxbourne Borough Council election =

UK local authority election

The Broxbourne Council election, 1996 was held to elect council members of the Broxbourne Borough Council, the local government authority of the borough of Broxbourne, Hertfordshire, England.

== Composition of expiring seats before election ==
Ward	Party	Incumbent Elected	Incumbent	Standing again?
Broxbourne	Conservative	1992	Peter Robinson	Yes
Bury Green	Conservative	1992	Hazel Jackson	Yes
Cheshunt Central	Conservative	1992	Ray Hannam	No
Cheshunt North	Conservative	1992	Gerald Game	Yes
Flamstead End	Conservative	1992	Edna Lazzari	Yes
Goffs Oak	Conservative	1992	Elizabeth Clayton	Yes
Hoddesdon North	Conservative	1992	Arthur Parkin	No
Hoddesdon Town	Conservative	1992	Kenneth Holliday	Yes
Rosedale	Conservative	1992	Neil McDonald	No
Rye Park	Conservative	1992	Maureen Moles	Yes
Theobalds	Conservative	1988	Barbara Bleach	No
Waltham Cross North	Conservative	1992	Francis Dolan	Yes
Waltham Cross South	Labour	1992	Martin Hudson	No
Wormley & Turnford	Conservative	1992	John Morton	No

== Election results ==
Broxbourne local election result 1996
Party	Seats	Gains	Losses	Net gain/loss	Seats %	Votes %	Votes	+/−
Conservative	10	0	3	-3	71.43	48.60	10,381	
Labour	4	3	0	+3	28.57	36.02	7,695	
Liberal Democrats	0	0	0	0	0.00	14.85	3,172	
Independent	0	0	0	0	0.00	0.53	113	

== Results summary ==
An election was held in 14 wards on 2 May 1996.

The Labour Party gained 3 seats at the expense of the Conservative Party by recording gains in Cheshunt North Ward, Rye Park Ward and Wormley Turnford Ward.

The political balance of the new council following this election was:

- Conservative 24 seats
- Labour 14 seats
- Liberal Democrat 4 seats

== Ward results ==
Broxbourne Ward Result 2 May 1996
Party	Candidate	Votes	%	±%
Conservative	Peter Robinson	1,063	56.15	
Labour	Winifred Press	443	23.40	
Liberal Democrats	Heather Campbell	387	20.45	
Majority		620		
Turnout		1,893	32.70	
Conservative hold		Swing		

Bury Green Ward Result 2 May 1996
Party	Candidate	Votes	%	±%
Conservative	Hazel Jackson	1,143	53.34	
Labour	Allen Wallace	1,000	46.66	
Majority		143		
Turnout		2,143	39.20	
Conservative hold		Swing		

Cheshunt Central Ward Result 2 May 1996
Party	Candidate	Votes	%	±%
Conservative	Milan Milovanovic	583	45.05	
Liberal Democrats	James Elmslie	380	29.37	
Labour	Graham Knight	331	25.58	
Majority		203		
Turnout		1,294	36.00	
Conservative hold		Swing		

Cheshunt North Ward Result 2 May 1996
Party	Candidate	Votes	%	±%
Labour	Richard Clark	847	48.51	
Conservative	Gerald Game	751	43.01	
Liberal Democrats	Julian Gould	148	8.48	
Majority		96		
Turnout		1,746	31.90	
Labour gain from Conservative		Swing		

Flamstead End Ward Result 2 May 1996
Party	Candidate	Votes	%	±%
Conservative	Edna Lazzari	922	53.29	
Labour	Henry Lucas	606	35.03	
Liberal Democrats	Peter Kemp	202	11.68	
Majority		316		
Turnout		1,730	33.60	
Conservative hold		Swing		

Goffs Oak Ward Result 2 May 1996
Party	Candidate	Votes	%	±%
Conservative	Elizabeth Clayton	800	66.45	
Labour	Joan Saggs	203	16.86	
Liberal Democrats	Patricia Mellis	201	16.69	
Majority		597		
Turnout		1,204	34.40	
Conservative hold		Swing		

Hoddesdon North Ward Result 2 May 1996
Party	Candidate	Votes	%	±%
Conservative	Evelyn White	812	46.56	
Liberal Democrats	Susan Wentworth-Shields	584	33.49	
Labour	Roy Wareham	348	19.95	
Majority		228		
Turnout		1,744	35.00	
Conservative hold		Swing		

Hoddesdon Town Ward Result 2 May 1996
Party	Candidate	Votes	%	±%
Conservative	Kenneth Holliday	869	49.66	
Labour	Trevor Jones	502	28.69	
Liberal Democrats	Malcolm Aitken	379	21.65	
Majority		367		
Turnout		1,750	34.50	
Conservative hold		Swing		

Rosedale Ward Result 2 May 1996
Party	Candidate	Votes	%	±%
Conservative	Darren Standing	438	45.53	
Liberal Democrats	Ernest Havis	305	31.70	
Labour	Janet Kousoulou	219	22.77	
Majority		133		
Turnout		962	33.00	
Conservative hold		Swing		

Rye Park Ward Result 2 May 1996
Party	Candidate	Votes	%	±%
Labour	Michael Malina	762	47.24	
Conservative	Maureen Moles	666	41.29	
Liberal Democrats	Sheila Guy	185	11.47	
Majority		96		
Turnout		1,613	34.30	
Labour gain from Conservative		Swing		

Theobalds Ward Result 2 May 1996
Party	Candidate	Votes	%	±%
Conservative	Gordon Nicholson	695	46.24	
Labour	Ronald McCole	690	45.91	
Liberal Democrats	Henry Appiah	118	7.85	
Majority		5		
Turnout		1,503	37.10	
Conservative hold		Swing		

Waltham Cross North Ward Result 2 May 1996
Party	Candidate	Votes	%	±%
Conservative	Francis Dolan	709	56.40	
Labour	Christopher Simonovitch	475	37.79	
Liberal Democrats	Anthony Stokes	73	5.81	
Majority		234		
Turnout		1,257	41.10	
Conservative hold		Swing		

Waltham Cross South Ward Result 2 May 1996
Party	Candidate	Votes	%	±%
Labour	Marios Kousoulou	686	56.65	
Conservative	Kay Leese	397	32.78	
Liberal Democrats	John Doolan	128	10.57	
Majority		289		
Turnout		1,211	27.40	
Labour hold		Swing		

Wormley / Turnford Ward Result 2 May 1996
Party	Candidate	Votes	%	±%
Labour	Mary Howard	583	44.47	
Conservative	Beryl Poole	533	40.66	
Independent	Colin Keighley	113	8.62	
Liberal Democrats	Bronwen Deards	82	6.25	
Majority		50		
Turnout		1,311	29.30	
Labour gain from Conservative		Swing		
