= 1996 Wolverhampton Metropolitan Borough Council election =

1996 UK local government election

Elections to Wolverhampton Metropolitan Borough Council were held on 2 May 1996. One third of the council was up for election and the Labour Party retained overall control of the council, gaining seven seats at the expense of the Conservative group.

== Composition ==
Prior to the election, the composition of the council was:

- Labour Party 39
- Conservative Party 19
- Liberal Democrat 2

After the election, the composition of the council was:

- Labour Party 46
- Conservative Party 12
- Liberal Democrat 2

== Election result ==
Wolverhampton local election result 1996
Party	Seats	Gains	Losses	Net gain/loss	Seats %	Votes %	Votes	+/−
Labour	46	7	0	+7	76.67			
Conservative	12	0	-7	-7	20.00			
Liberal Democrats	2	0	0	0	3.33			

== Ward results ==
Bilston East
Party	Candidate	Votes	%	±%
Labour	J Collingswood	1549		
Liberal Democrats	Mrs A E Ramsbottom	407		
Conservative	E Topliss	267		
Majority		1142		
Labour hold		Swing		

Bilston North
Party	Candidate	Votes	%	±%
Labour	M Stringer	2026		
Conservative	F Haley	788		
Liberal Democrats	I Ellis	282		
Majority		1238		
Labour gain from Conservative		Swing		

Blakenhall
Party	Candidate	Votes	%	±%
Labour	Robert Jones	2465		
Conservative	W Sandhu	645		
Liberal Democrats	R Gray	238		
Majority		1820		
Labour hold		Swing		

Bushbury
Party	Candidate	Votes	%	±%
Labour	K Stelfox	1592		
Conservative	Charles Brueton	1464		
Liberal Democrats	C Jenkins	236		
Majority		123		
Labour gain from Conservative		Swing		

East Park
Party	Candidate	Votes	%	±%
Labour	Mrs Pat Byrne	2086		
Conservative	L Berry	386		
Liberal Democrats	T O'Brien	158		
Majority		1700		
Labour hold		Swing		

Ettingshall
Party	Candidate	Votes	%	±%
Labour	A Johnson	1723		
Conservative	M Hanson	362		
Liberal Democrats	M Heap	125		
Majority		1361		
Labour hold		Swing		

Fallings Park
Party	Candidate	Votes	%	±%
Labour	C Dougherty	1786		
Conservative	K Hodges	918		
Liberal	A Bourke	336		
Majority		868		
Labour gain from Conservative		Swing		

Graiseley
Party	Candidate	Votes	%	±%
Labour	L Moore	2372		
Conservative	N Patten	1432		
Liberal Democrats	M Millar	304		
Majority		940		
Labour gain from Conservative		Swing		

Heath Town
Party	Candidate	Votes	%	±%
Labour	L Turner	1394		
Liberal	C Hallmark	518		
Conservative	G Wright	314		
Majority		876		
Labour hold		Swing		

Low Hill
Party	Candidate	Votes	%	±%
Labour	J McCallum	1676		
Conservative	P Topliss	302		
Liberal Democrats	D E Iles	228		
Majority		1374		
Labour hold		Swing		

Merry Hill
Party	Candidate	Votes	%	±%
Conservative	Mrs Christine Mills	1898		
Labour	C Matthews	1677		
Liberal Democrats	J White	375		
Majority		221		
Conservative hold		Swing		

Oxley
Party	Candidate	Votes	%	±%
Labour	P Allen	1820		
Conservative	P O'Connell	1073		
Liberal Democrats	I Jenkins	327		
Majority		747		
Labour gain from Conservative		Swing		

Park
Party	Candidate	Votes	%	±%
Labour	E Edmondson	2208		
Conservative	M Griffiths	1777		
Liberal Democrats	B Lewis	380		
Majority		431		
Labour hold		Swing		

Penn
Party	Candidate	Votes	%	±%
Conservative	Alan Hart	2058		
Labour	A Convery	1713		
Liberal Democrats	P Beeston	458		
Majority		345		
Conservative hold		Swing		

Spring Vale
Party	Candidate	Votes	%	±%
Liberal Democrats	Richard Whitehouse	2403		
Labour	E Brookes	1469		
Conservative	C Haynes	229		
Majority		934		
Liberal Democrats hold		Swing		

St Peter's
Party	Candidate	Votes	%	±%
Labour	S Duhra	2022		
Conservative	T Perkins	421		
Liberal Democrats	D Murray	413		
Majority		1601		
Labour hold		Swing		

Tettenhall Regis
Party	Candidate	Votes	%	±%
Conservative	Mrs Doreen Seiboth	1672		
Liberal Democrats	L MacLean	1347		
Labour	J Jaspal	597		
Majority		325		
Conservative hold		Swing		

Tettenhall Wightwick
Party	Candidate	Votes	%	±%
Conservative	A Wynne	2385		
Labour	S Tracey	1008		
Liberal Democrats	P Bennett	361		
Majority		1377		
Conservative hold		Swing		

Wednesfield North
Party	Candidate	Votes	%	±%
Labour	M Stafford-Good	2015		
Conservative	Andrew Dawson	955		
Liberal	M Pearson	432		
Majority		1060		
Labour gain from Conservative		Swing		

Wednesfield South
Party	Candidate	Votes	%	±%
Labour	S Hall	1822		
Conservative	S Jevon	939		
Liberal Democrats	J Steatham	241		
Majority		883		
Labour gain from Conservative		Swing		
