= 1996 Southend-on-Sea Borough Council election =

1996 UK local government election

← 1995	4 May 1996	1997 →

14 out of 39 seats to Southend-on-Sea Borough Council 20 seats needed for a majority

	First party	Second party	Third party
Party	Liberal Democrats	Labour	Conservative
Seats won	7	5	2
Seats after	18	12	9
Seat change	▲4	▲2	▼6
Popular vote	13,100	14,907	14,705
Percentage	30.7%	34.9%	34.4%
Swing	▼3.3%	▲1.4%	▲1.9%
- Winner of each seat at the 1996 Southend-on-Sea Borough Council election.
Council control before election
No overall control
Council control after election
No overall control

The 1996 Southend-on-Sea Council election took place on 2 May 1996 to elect members of Southend-on-Sea Borough Council in Essex, England. One third of the council was up for election.

== Summary ==
=== Election result ===
1996 Southend-on-Sea Borough Council election
Party	This election			Full council			This election		
Party	Seats	Net	Seats %	Other	Total	Total %	Votes	Votes %	+/−
Liberal Democrats	7	▲4	50.0	11	18	45.0	13,100	30.7	–3.3
Labour	5	▲2	35.7	6	12	27.5	14,907	34.9	+1.4
Conservative	2	▼6	14.3	8	9	25.0	14,705	34.4	+1.9

== Ward results ==
=== Belfairs ===
Belfairs
Party	Candidate	Votes	%	±%
Liberal Democrats	O. Shapiro	1,773	43.4	±0.0
Conservative	H. Briggs	1,773	43.4	+4.8
Labour	J. Grindley	542	13.3	–4.7
Majority		0	0.0	–4.8
Turnout		4,088	45.0	–0.3
Registered electors		9,096		
Liberal Democrats gain from Conservative		Swing	▼2.4	

=== Blenheim ===
Blenheim
Party	Candidate	Votes	%	±%
Liberal Democrats	B. Smith	1,586	41.0	–8.5
Labour	T. Merrison	1,142	29.5	+7.5
Conservative	T. Ager	1,137	29.4	+0.9
Majority		444	11.5	–9.5
Turnout		3,865	41.6	+4.0
Registered electors		9,309		
Liberal Democrats gain from Conservative		Swing	▼8.0	

=== Chalkwell ===
Chalkwell
Party	Candidate	Votes	%	±%
Liberal Democrats	H. Lister-Smith	1,444	44.0	+3.0
Conservative	J. Tobin*	1,416	43.1	+0.8
Labour	M. Humphrey	425	12.9	–3.8
Majority		28	0.9	N/A
Turnout		3,285	33.8	–2.9
Registered electors		9,743		
Liberal Democrats gain from Conservative		Swing	▲1.1	

=== Eastwood ===
Eastwood
Party	Candidate	Votes	%	±%
Liberal Democrats	R. Fisher	1,556	41.7	+1.1
Conservative	R. Weaver*	1,350	36.2	+1.4
Labour	M. Flewitt	823	22.1	–2.5
Majority		206	5.5	–0.3
Turnout		3,729	34.8	–3.8
Registered electors		10,749		
Liberal Democrats gain from Conservative		Swing	▼0.2	

=== Leigh ===
Leigh
Party	Candidate	Votes	%	±%
Liberal Democrats	A. Smulian	1,574	47.9	–8.8
Conservative	J. Rowsell	934	28.4	+2.3
Labour	P. Circus	779	23.7	+6.4
Majority		640	19.5	–11.1
Turnout		3,287	35.3	–4.6
Registered electors		9,352		
Liberal Democrats hold		Swing	▼5.6	

=== Milton ===
Milton
Party	Candidate	Votes	%	±%
Labour	L. Felton	1,271	54.7	+0.6
Conservative	R. Davy	798	34.3	–2.0
Liberal Democrats	W. Petchey	256	11.0	+1.4
Majority		473	20.4	+2.6
Turnout		2,325	25.5	–5.5
Registered electors		9,113		
Labour gain from Conservative		Swing	▲1.3	

=== Prittlewell ===
Prittlewell
Party	Candidate	Votes	%	±%
Liberal Democrats	W. Elf	1,626	56.0	+2.8
Conservative	B. Houssart	744	25.6	+1.3
Labour	Z. Chaudhri	533	18.4	–4.0
Majority		882	30.4	N/A
Turnout		2,903	31.6	–4.0
Registered electors		9,207		
Liberal Democrats hold		Swing	▲0.8	

=== Shoebury ===
Shoebury
Party	Candidate	Votes	%	±%
Labour	L. Wisken	2,046	50.6	+4.8
Conservative	A. North*	1,594	39.4	–0.3
Liberal Democrats	S. Newton	403	10.0	–4.5
Majority		452	11.2	+5.1
Turnout		4,043	26.3	–6.8
Registered electors		15,131		
Labour gain from Conservative		Swing	▲2.6	

=== Southchurch ===
Southchurch
Party	Candidate	Votes	%	±%
Conservative	A. Holland	1,418	50.1	+4.8
Labour	D. Garne	1,080	38.2	–2.1
Liberal Democrats	P. Craddock	331	11.7	–2.6
Majority		338	11.9	+6.9
Turnout		2,829	31.1	–4.1
Registered electors		9,105		
Conservative hold		Swing	▲3.5	

=== St. Luke's ===
St. Luke's
Party	Candidate	Votes	%	±%
Labour	R. Copley*	1,542	70.9	–1.4
Labour	J. Mapp	1,323	60.8	–11.5
Conservative	C. Langlands	503	23.1	+5.1
Conservative	D. Ayre	481	22.1	+4.1
Liberal Democrats	R. Alexander	268	12.3	+2.5
Liberal Democrats	J. Kaufman	233	10.7	+0.9
Turnout		~2,350	27.6	–5.3
Registered electors		8,515		
Labour hold				
Labour hold				

=== Thorpe ===
Thorpe
Party	Candidate	Votes	%	±%
Conservative	S. Ayre*	1,688	58.6	+7.3
Labour	C. Smith	748	25.9	–0.1
Liberal Democrats	A. Miller	447	15.5	–7.2
Majority		940	32.7	+7.4
Turnout		2,883	28.7	–3.4
Registered electors		10,057		
Conservative hold		Swing	▲3.7	

=== Victoria ===
Victoria
Party	Candidate	Votes	%	±%
Labour	R. Crisp	1,788	70.6	–0.7
Conservative	M. Longden	482	19.0	+1.1
Liberal Democrats	T. Ray	261	10.2	–0.5
Majority		1,306	51.6	–1.8
Turnout		2,531	26.5	–3.6
Registered electors		9,552		
Labour hold		Swing	▼0.9	

=== Westborough ===
Westborough
Party	Candidate	Votes	%	±%
Liberal Democrats	H. Gibeon	1,342	51.7	–0.8
Labour	M. Royston	865	33.3	+1.3
Conservative	R. Brown	387	14.9	–0.6
Majority		477	18.4	–2.1
Turnout		2,594	29.8	–1.7
Registered electors		8,741		
Liberal Democrats hold		Swing	▼1.1	
