= 1996 Rochford District Council election =

1996 UK local government election

- 2 May 1996

13 out of 40 seats on the Rochford District Council 21 seats needed for a majority
	First party	Second party	Third party
Party	Liberal Democrats	Labour	Conservative
Last election	8	3	1
Seats before	22	8	7
Seats won	6	4	1
Seats after	23	11	2
Seat change	▲1	▲3	▼5
Popular vote	4,697	3,915	3,704
Percentage	34.0%	28.3%	26.8%
Swing			▼
	Fourth party	Fifth party
Party	Residents	Independent
Last election	N/A	1
Seats before	2	1
Seats won	2	N/A
Seats after	3	1
Seat change	▲1	Steady
Popular vote	1,500	N/A
Percentage	10.9%	N/A

Elections to Rochford Council were held on 2 May 1996. One third of the council was up for election.

== Results summary ==
1996 Rochford District Council election
Party	This election			Full council			This election		
Party	Seats	Net	Seats %	Other	Total	Total %	Votes	Votes %	+/−
Liberal Democrats	6	▲1	46.2	17	23	57.5	4,697	34.0	
Labour	4	▲3	30.8	7	11	27.5	3,915	28.3	
Residents	2	▲1	15.4	2	3	7.5	1,500	10.9	
Conservative	1	▼5	7.7	1	2	5.0	3,704	26.8	
Independent	0	Steady	0.0	1	1	2.5	0	0.0	

== Ward results ==
=== Ashingdon ===
Ashingdon
Party	Candidate	Votes	%	±%
Liberal Democrats	A. Hosking	434	49.0	
Conservative	L. Phillips	318	35.9	
Labour	C. Stephenson	133	15.0	
Majority			13.1	
Turnout			38.0	
Liberal Democrats hold		Swing		

=== Downhall ===
Downhall
Party	Candidate	Votes	%	±%
Liberal Democrats	C. Black	716	66.9	
Conservative	R. Powell	213	19.9	
Labour	C. Rice	142	13.3	
Majority			47.0	
Turnout			36.0	
Liberal Democrats hold		Swing		

=== Grange and Rawreth ===
Grange & Rawreth
Party	Candidate	Votes	%	±%
Liberal Democrats	P. Beckers	648	42.5	
Labour	D. Rossi	498	32.7	
Conservative	R. Adams	378	24.8	
Majority			9.8	
Turnout			34.0	
Liberal Democrats hold		Swing		

=== Hawkwell East ===
Hawkwell East
Party	Candidate	Votes	%	±%
Liberal Democrats	B. Ayling	818	49.6	
Labour	J. Dickson	439	26.6	
Conservative	L. Hungate	392	23.8	
Majority			23.0	
Turnout			29.0	
Liberal Democrats gain from Conservative		Swing		

=== Hawkwell West ===
Hawkwell West
Party	Candidate	Votes	%	±%
Labour	G. Plackett	452	41.9	
Residents	J. Mason	279	25.8	
Conservative	T. Fawell	235	21.8	
Liberal Democrats	K. Saunders	114	10.6	
Majority			16.1	
Turnout			36.0	
Labour gain from Conservative		Swing		

=== Hockley Central ===
Hockley Central
Party	Candidate	Votes	%	±%
Residents	V. Hutchings	346	45.4	
Conservative	P. Webster	263	34.5	
Labour	J. Ford	100	13.1	
Liberal Democrats	G. Carr	53	7.0	
Majority			10.9	
Turnout			39.0	
Residents gain from Conservative		Swing		

=== Hockley East ===
Hockley East
Party	Candidate	Votes	%	±%
Residents	A. Hutchings	748	64.9	
Labour	D. Thompson	248	21.5	
Conservative	C. Hungate	156	13.5	
Majority			43.4	
Turnout			38.0	
Residents hold		Swing		

=== Hockley West ===
Hockley West
Party	Candidate	Votes	%	±%
Conservative	E. Hart	375	44.4	
Liberal Democrats	D. Ball	241	28.5	
Residents	B. Guyett	127	15.0	
Labour	D. Ford	102	12.1	
Majority			15.9	
Turnout			39.0	
Conservative hold		Swing		

=== Hullbridge Riverside ===
Hullbridge Riverside
Party	Candidate	Votes	%	±%
Labour	C. Morgan	633	63.5	
Conservative	T. Chapman	267	26.8	
Liberal Democrats	M. Pearson	97	9.7	
Majority			36.7	
Turnout			33.0	
Labour hold		Swing		

=== Hullbridge South ===
Hullbridge South
Party	Candidate	Votes	%	±%
Labour	G. Angus	432	63.3	
Conservative	J. Spillane	159	23.3	
Liberal Democrats	D. Byrne	91	13.3	
Majority			40.0	
Turnout			31.0	
Labour gain from Conservative		Swing		

=== Lodge ===
Lodge
Party	Candidate	Votes	%	±%
Liberal Democrats	D. Barnes	860	58.8	
Conservative	T. Livings	393	26.9	
Labour	C. Rice	209	14.3	
Majority			31.9	
Turnout			32.0	
Liberal Democrats hold		Swing		

=== Rayleigh Central ===
Rayleigh Central
Party	Candidate	Votes	%	±%
Liberal Democrats	N. Harris	543	56.7	
Conservative	D. Lawton	247	25.8	
Labour	J. Fielding	168	17.5	
Majority			30.9	
Turnout			34.0	
Liberal Democrats hold		Swing		

=== Rochford St. Andrew's ===
Rochford St. Andrew's
Party	Candidate	Votes	%	±%
Labour	M. Vince	359	47.9	
Conservative	R. Amner	308	41.1	
Liberal Democrats	R. Prestige	82	10.9	
Majority			6.8	
Turnout			35.0	
Labour gain from Conservative		Swing		
