= 1996 Cheltenham Borough Council election =

English local elections

The 1996 Cheltenham Council election took place on 2 May 1996 to elect members of Cheltenham Borough Council in Gloucestershire, England. One third of the council was up for election and the Liberal Democrats stayed in overall control of the council. After failing to hold a single seat in either 1994 or 1995, the Conservatives avoided wipeout by holding three seats.

After the election, the composition of the council was:

- Liberal Democrat 34
- Conservative 3
- People Against Bureaucracy 3
- Labour 1

== Election result ==
Cheltenham local election result 1996
Party	Seats	Gains	Losses	Net gain/loss	Seats %	Votes %	Votes	+/−
Liberal Democrats	10	6	0	+6	71.4	47.6	14,658	-1.4
Conservative	3	0	5	-5	21.4	32.3	9,957	+4.5
PAB	1	0	0	0	7.1	6.1	1,890	-2.0
Labour	0	0	1	-1	0.0	14.0	4,299	-0.4

== Ward results ==
All Saints
Party	Candidate	Votes	%	±%
Liberal Democrats	Christine Franklin	1,166	50.8	−3.2
Conservative	Daphne Pennell*	823	35.9	+4.3
Labour	Michael Pearce	306	13.3	−1.1
Majority		343	14.9	
Turnout		2,295	34.53	
Liberal Democrats gain from Conservative		Swing		

Charlton Kings
Party	Candidate	Votes	%	±%
Conservative	William Todman*	1,554	47.1	+6.1
Liberal Democrats	Claire Grainger	1,516	46.0	−3.8
Labour	Adam Moliver	229	6.9	−2.4
Majority		38	1.1	
Turnout		3,299	51.59	
Conservative hold		Swing		

College
Party	Candidate	Votes	%	±%
Liberal Democrats	Lloyd Surgenor	1,620	49.5	−0.8
Conservative	Leslie Freeman*	1,417	43.3	+2.6
Labour	Adrian Ham	237	7.2	−1.8
Majority		343	14.9	
Turnout		3,274	48.84	
Liberal Democrats gain from Conservative		Swing		

Hatherley & The Reddings
Party	Candidate	Votes	%	±%
Liberal Democrats	Paul McLain	1,378	49.8	−1.2
Conservative	Jacqueline Fletcher*	1,118	40.4	+12.8
Labour	Marc Latham	272	9.8	−6.5
Majority		260	9.4	
Turnout		2,768	37.11	
Liberal Democrats gain from Conservative		Swing		

Hesters Way
Party	Candidate	Votes	%	±%
Liberal Democrats	Sandra Holliday	1,226	69.3	+0.8
Labour	Reginald Iddles	293	16.6	−1.2
Conservative	Edward Warhurst	251	14.2	+0.6
Majority		933	52.7	
Turnout		1,770	24.73	
Liberal Democrats hold		Swing		

Lansdown
Party	Candidate	Votes	%	±%
Liberal Democrats	Robert Jones	903	45.8	−0.2
Liberal Democrats	Elizabeth Whalley	892	45.2	−0.8
Conservative	Susan Starling	812	41.2	−0.3
Conservative	John Melville-Smith	811	41.1	−0.4
Labour	Robert Irons	280	14.2	+1.6
Labour	Kristine Mason-O'Connor	242	12.3	−0.3
Majority		80	4.0	
Turnout		1,972	32.85	
Liberal Democrats gain from Conservative		Swing		
Liberal Democrats hold		Swing		

Leckhampton with Up Hatherley
Party	Candidate	Votes	%	±%
Conservative	Kenneth Buckland*	958	34.8	+9.1
Liberal Democrats	Graham Pollitt	835	30.3	−12.2
PAB	David Hall	696	25.3	−6.4
Labour	Roger Whyborn	264	9.6	N/A
Majority		123	4.5	
Turnout		2,753	41.34	
Conservative hold		Swing		

Park
Party	Candidate	Votes	%	±%
Conservative	Robert Garnham*	1,309	49.1	+4.6
Liberal Democrats	Dilys Roberts	1,182	44.3	−1.9
Labour	Chetan Bhatt	177	6.6	−2.7
Majority		127	4.8	
Turnout		2,668	45.78	
Conservative hold		Swing		

Pittville
Party	Candidate	Votes	%	±%
Liberal Democrats	Colin O'Connell	1,305	47.0	+7.1
Labour	Frank Bench	1,052	37.9	−4.7
Conservative	Reginald Built-Leonard	420	15.1	+1.0
Majority		253	9.1	
Turnout		2,777	47.60	
Liberal Democrats gain from Labour		Swing		

Prestbury
Party	Candidate	Votes	%	±%
PAB	John Newman*	1,194	49.8	+2.8
Conservative	John Walker	548	22.9	−0.4
Liberal Democrats	Josephine Grimster	453	18.9	−10.8
Labour	Michael Chapman	201	8.4	N/A
Majority		646	26.9	
Turnout		2,396	41.59	
PAB hold		Swing		

St Mark's
Party	Candidate	Votes	%	±%
Liberal Democrats	Alexis Cassin*	969	71.5	+6.3
Labour	Andre Curtis	221	16.3	−6.3
Conservative	Lorraine Pennell	166	12.2	±0.0
Majority		748	55.2	
Turnout		1,356	26.82	
Liberal Democrats hold		Swing		

St Paul's
Party	Candidate	Votes	%	±%
Liberal Democrats	Elizabeth Clarke*	1,005	61.4	−4.4
Conservative	Puck Wertwyn	321	19.6	+3.8
Labour	Simon Robinson	311	19.0	+0.6
Majority		684	41.8	
Turnout		1,637	29.06	
Liberal Democrats hold		Swing		

St Peter's
Party	Candidate	Votes	%	±%
Liberal Democrats	David Lawrence	1,100	60.6	+7.3
Labour	Clive Harriss	456	25.1	−7.0
Conservative	Ian Cresswell	260	14.3	−0.3
Majority		748	35.5	N/A
Turnout		1,816	30.63	
Liberal Democrats gain from Conservative		Swing		
