= 1996 Gloucester City Council election =

UK local election

The 1996 Gloucester City Council election took place on 5 May 1996 to elect members of Gloucester City Council in England.

== Results ==
Gloucester City Council election, 1996
Party	Seats	Gains	Losses	Net gain/loss	Seats %	Votes %	Votes	+/−
Conservative	2					36.7		
Labour	8					49.2		
Liberal Democrats	1					21.0		
Green	0					0.0		
Independent	0					0.0		

== Ward results ==
=== Barnwood ===
Barnwood 1996
Party	Candidate	Votes	%	±%
Labour	Ms. I. Potts	1,719	45.4	
Conservative	A. Gravells	1414	37.3	
Liberal Democrats	Ms. A. Easton-Skinner	655	17.3	
Turnout		11559		
Labour hold		Swing		

=== Barton ===
Barton 1996
Party	Candidate	Votes	%	±%
Labour	E. Garwood	1,014	75.3	
Conservative	L. Proctor	189	14.0	
Liberal Democrats	M. Ginwalla	143	10.6	
Turnout		5037		
Labour hold		Swing		

=== Eastgate ===
Eastgate 1996
Party	Candidate	Votes	%	±%
Labour	M. Pepler	1,161	64.8	
Conservative	H. Harrison	357	19.9	
Liberal Democrats	U. Bhaimia	273	15.2	
Turnout		5937		
Labour hold		Swing		

=== Hucclecote ===
Hucclecote 1996
Party	Candidate	Votes	%	±%
Liberal Democrats	Ms. S. Blakeley	1,439	39.6	
Conservative	Pullon C.	1288	35.4	
Labour	R. Mills	910	25.0	
Turnout		8323		
Liberal Democrats win (new seat)				

=== Kingsholm ===
Kingsholm 1996
Party	Candidate	Votes	%	±%
Conservative	P. James	1,188	43.5	
Liberal Democrats	M. Parry	939	34.3	
Labour	Ms. S. Hitchings	607	22.2	
Turnout		6490		
Conservative hold		Swing		

=== Linden ===
Linden 1996
Party	Candidate	Votes	%	±%
Labour	Trehearne P.	1,235	69.8	
Conservative	D. Knight	378	21.4	
Liberal Democrats	Ms. V. Wilcox	157	8.9	
Turnout		5327		
Labour hold		Swing		

=== Longlevens ===
Longlevens 1996
Party	Candidate	Votes	%	±%
Labour	D. Hitchings	1,392	53.2	
Conservative	C. Marshall	798	30.5	
Liberal Democrats	Ms. N. West	427	16.3	
Turnout		6684		
Labour hold		Swing		

=== Matson ===
Matson 1996
Party	Candidate	Votes	%	±%
Labour	J. Holmes	1,399	75.2	
Conservative	C. Gleeson	241	13.0	
Liberal Democrats	M. Gladstone	157	8.4	
Labour	J. Ewers	63	3.4	
Turnout		5613		
Labour hold		Swing		

=== Podsmead ===
Podsmead 1996
Party	Candidate	Votes	%	±%
Labour	Ms. D. Capon	1,186	64.6	
Conservative	Ms. E. Orr	394	21.5	
Liberal Democrats	C. Reed	256	13.9	
Turnout		5826		
Labour hold		Swing		

=== Tuffley ===
Tuffley 1996
Party	Candidate	Votes	%	±%
Labour	Ms. J. Lugg	1,462	61.9	
Conservative	K. Moran	626	26.5	
Liberal Democrats	Ms. A. Evans	274	11.6	
Turnout		6185		
Labour hold		Swing		

=== Westgate ===
Westgate 1996
Party	Candidate	Votes	%	±%
Conservative	Ms. P. Tracey	720	37.0	
Liberal Democrats	P. Lush	671	34.5	
Labour	B. Large	555	28.5	
Turnout		5211		
Conservative hold		Swing		
