= North Hertfordshire District Council elections =

Local government elections in Hertfordshire, England

One third of North Hertfordshire District Council in England is elected each year, followed by one year without election. A boundary review is underway to allow the council to instead be elected all at once every four years from 2024 onwards.

== Council elections ==
Composition of the council
Year	Conservative	Labour	Liberal Democrats (Note: Includes totals for the predecessors of the Liberal Democrats, the Liberal Party and SDP (both of which participated in the Alliance).)	Independents & Others	Council control after election
Local government reorganisation; council established (48 seats)
1973	23	17	0	8	No overall control
1976	30	11	0	7	Conservative
New ward boundaries (50 seats)
1979	34	12	0	4	Conservative
1980	32	14	0	4	Conservative
1982	32	14	0	4	Conservative
1983	30	15	1	4	Conservative
1984	31	12	2	5	Conservative
1986	26	14	7	3	Conservative
1987	26	13	8	3	Conservative
1988	27	13	7	3	Conservative
1990	29	15	3	3	Conservative
1991	26	18	2	4	Conservative
1992	26	17	3	4	Conservative
1994	25	18	5	2	No overall control
1995	22	21	6	1	No overall control
1996	16	26	7	1	Labour
1998	17	26	6	1	Labour
New ward boundaries (49 seats)
1999	28	18	3	0	Conservative
2000	29	18	2	0	Conservative
2002	28	17	4	0	Conservative
2003	27	16	6	0	Conservative
2004	28	14	7	0	Conservative
2006	33	9	7	0	Conservative
New ward boundaries (49 seats)
2007	30	10	9	0	Conservative
2008	32	8	9	0	Conservative
2010	33	7	9	0	Conservative
2011	34	7	8	0	Conservative
2012	33	10	6	0	Conservative
2014	34	12	3	0	Conservative
2015	36	11	2	0	Conservative
2016	34	12	3	0	Conservative
2018	29	14	6	0	Conservative
2019	22	16	11	0	No overall control
2021	23	15	11	0	No overall control
2022	19	17	13	0	No overall control
2023	15	19	15	0	No overall control
New ward boundaries (51 seats)
2024	7	25	19	0	No overall control

== Borough result maps ==
2002 results map

2003 results map

2004 results map

2006 results map

2007 results map

2008 results map

2010 results map

2011 results map

2012 results map

2014 results map

2015 results map

2016 results map

2018 results map

2019 results map

2021 results map

2022 results map

2023 results map

2024 results map

== By-elections ==
=== 2002-2006 ===
Baldock East By-Election 17 November 2005
Party	Candidate	Votes	%	±%
Liberal Democrats	Marilyn Kirkland	331	48.3	−4.7
Conservative		324	47.2	+0.2
Labour		31	4.5	+4.5
Majority		7	1.0	
Turnout		686		
Liberal Democrats hold		Swing		

=== 2010-2014 ===
Hitchwood, Offa and Hoo By-Election 15 November 2012
Party	Candidate	Votes	%	±%
Conservative	Faye Barnard	774	56.8	−7.4
UKIP	Peter Robbins	217	15.9	+15.9
Labour	Jackie McDonald	189	13.9	−3.1
Liberal Democrats	Peter Johnson	110	8.1	+0.4
Green	George Howe	72	5.3	−5.8
Majority		557	40.9	
Turnout		1,362		
Conservative hold		Swing		

Letchworth South West By-Election 15 November 2012
Party	Candidate	Votes	%	±%
Conservative	Julian Cunningham	761	51.3	−2.7
Labour	Martin Stears-Handscomb	399	26.9	+7.1
UKIP	John Barry	184	12.4	+12.4
Liberal Democrats	Margaret Higbid	88	5.9	−7.6
Green	Mario May	51	3.4	−9.3
Majority		362	24.4	
Turnout		1,483		
Conservative hold		Swing		

Hitchin Oughton By-Election 12 September 2013
Party	Candidate	Votes	%	±%
Labour	Frank Radcliffe	361	48.0	−12.8
Conservative	Mara MacSeoinin	180	23.9	−0.7
UKIP	Peter Croft	148	19.7	+19.7
Green	Jacqueline Greatorex	32	4.3	−5.5
Liberal Democrats	Clare Body	31	4.1	−0.7
Majority		181	24.1	
Turnout		752		
Labour hold		Swing		

=== 2014-2018 ===
Hitchin Oughton By-Election 10 November 2016
Party	Candidate	Votes	%	±%
Labour	Martin Stears-Handscomb	258	31.9	−17.4
Independent	Jackie McDonald	200	24.8	+24.8
Conservative	Serena Farrow	158	19.6	−12.4
Liberal Democrats	Louise Peace	150	18.6	+9.9
Green	George Howe	42	5.2	−4.8
Majority		58	7.2	
Turnout		808		
Labour hold		Swing		

Hitchin Priory By-Election 4 May 2017
Party	Candidate	Votes	%	±%
Conservative	Raymond Shakespeare-Smith	717	41.7	−2.6
Liberal Democrats	John Hefford	394	22.9	+12.3
Independent	Jacqueline McDonald	277	16.1	+6.1
Labour	Dave Winstanley	219	12.7	−5.5
Green	Des Stephens	114	6.6	−2.6
Majority		323	7.2	
Turnout		1,721		
Conservative hold		Swing		

Royston Heath By-Election 4 May 2017
Party	Candidate	Votes	%	±%
Conservative	Sarah Dingley	844	50.4	−0.6
Liberal Democrats	Carol Stanier	470	28.1	+14.7
Labour	Vaughan West	196	11.7	−4.6
Green	Katherine Shann	97	5.8	−1.3
UKIP	Christopher Arquati	68	4.1	−8.0
Majority		374	22.3	
Turnout		1,675		
Conservative hold		Swing		

=== 2018-2022 ===
Hitchin Highbury By-Election 10 March 2022
Party	Candidate	Votes	%	±%
Liberal Democrats	Raj Bhakar	1,238	67.0	+18.6
Conservative	Samuel Forsyth	450	24.3	−3.8
Green	Deolinda Eltringham	134	7.2	−1.1
CPA	Leigh Smith	27	1.5	+0.4
Majority		788	42.6	
Turnout		1,849		
Liberal Democrats hold		Swing		

=== 2022-2026 ===
Royston Palace By-Election 17 October 2024
Party	Candidate	Votes	%	±%
Labour	Sarah Lucas	302	25.9	−12.5
Liberal Democrats	Gill Lewis	298	25.6	+1.7
Conservative	Callum Bartram-Bell	280	24.1	−0.7
Reform	John Froggett	196	16.8	+16.8
Green	Peter Wilkin	88	7.6	+7.6
Majority		4	0.3	
Turnout		1,164		
Labour hold		Swing		

=== 2026-2030 ===
Letchworth Norton By-Election 19 November 2026
Party	Candidate	Votes	%	±%
Labour	Indie Sunner	489	36.0	−8.9
Conservative	Simon Bloxham	310	22.8	−6.7
Liberal Democrats	Timothy Oughton	215	15.8	+5.2
Reform	Steven Adelantado	184	13.5	+13.5
Green	Hannah Tattersall	112	8.2	−6.8
Restore	Neil Almond	48	3.5	+3.5
Majority		179	13.2	
Turnout		1,358		
Labour hold		Swing		
