= 1980 North Hertfordshire District Council election =

Council election in England

← 1979	1 May 1980	1982 →

17 of 50 seats on North Hertfordshire District Council 26 seats needed for a majority
	First party	Second party
	Con	Lab
Leader	Bob Flatman
Party	Conservative	Labour
Seats before	34	12
Seats after	32	14
Seat change	▼2	▲2
	Third party	Fourth party
	Ind	RA
Party	Independent	Ratepayers
Seats before	2	2
Seats after	2	2
Seat change	Steady	Steady
Leader before election
Bob Flatman
Conservative
Leader after election
Bob Flatman
Conservative

The 1980 North Hertfordshire District Council election was held on 1 May 1980, at the same time as other local elections across England and Scotland. There were 17 out of 50 seats on North Hertfordshire District Council up for election, being the usual third of the council.

The election saw Labour take the largest share of the vote, winning two seats from the Conservatives, but the Conservatives retained their majority on the council.

== Overall results ==
The overall results were as follows:

1980 North Hertfordshire District Council election
Party	This election			Full council			This election		
Party	Seats	Net	Seats %	Other	Total	Total %	Votes	Votes %	+/−
Labour	8	▲2	47.1	6	14	28.0	13,923	47.7	+13.9
Conservative	8	▼2	47.1	24	32	64.0	12,306	42.2	-9.8
Liberal	0	Steady	0.0	0	0	0.0	1,096	3.8	-0.9
Ratepayers	0	Steady	0.0	2	2	4.0	777	2.7	-0.9
Ecology	0	Steady	0.0	0	0	0.0	595	2.0	+1.0
Independent	1	Steady	5.9	1	2	4.0	438	1.5	-3.1
National Front	0	Steady	0.0	0	0	0.0	59	0.2	0.0

== Ward results ==
The results for each ward were as follows. An asterisk(*) indicates a sitting councillor standing for re-election.

Ashbrook ward
Party	Candidate	Votes	%	±%
Conservative	Michael Tatham*	685	62.2	−1.1
Labour	Keith Brydon	416	37.8	+1.1
Turnout			53.2	
Registered electors		2,068		
Conservative hold		Swing	-1.1	

Baldock ward
Party	Candidate	Votes	%	±%
Labour	Willy Page*	1,305	56.5	+18.7
Conservative	Colin Vaughan	798	34.6	−8.3
Ecology	Stephen Toogood	205	8.9	+8.9
Turnout			45.8	
Registered electors		5,039		
Labour hold		Swing	+13.5	

Cadwell ward
Party	Candidate	Votes	%	±%
Independent	Ron Lodge*	438	59.3	+7.2
Conservative	Allison Ashley	163	22.1	−11.6
Labour	Joan Kirby	137	18.6	+7.7
Turnout			42.3	
Registered electors		1,745		
Independent hold		Swing	+9.4	

Hitchin Bearton ward
Party	Candidate	Votes	%	±%
Labour	Judi Smith	1,013	52.9	+8.1
Conservative	Terry Keaveney	902	47.1	−3.7
Turnout			44.0	
Registered electors		4,352		
Labour gain from Conservative		Swing	+5.9	

Hitchin Highbury ward
Party	Candidate	Votes	%	±%
Conservative	Phillip MacCormack	1,361	66.7	−5.1
Labour	Keith Ruff	480	23.5	−4.7
Ecology	Brian Goodale	200	9.8	+9.8
Turnout			41.1	
Registered electors		4,966		
Conservative hold		Swing	-0.2	

Hitchin Oughton ward
Party	Candidate	Votes	%	±%
Labour	Martin Stears*	1,291	69.5	+16.6
Conservative	Derrick Ashley	508	27.3	−11.2
National Front	Victor Logan	59	3.2	−5.4
Turnout			41.8	
Registered electors		4,445		
Labour hold		Swing	+13.9	

Hitchin Priory ward
Party	Candidate	Votes	%	±%
Conservative	Frank Howett	965	83.6	+4.5
Labour	Paul Prescott	189	16.4	−4.5
Turnout			41.0	
Registered electors		2,815		
Conservative hold		Swing	+4.5	

Hitchin Walsworth ward
Party	Candidate	Votes	%	±%
Labour	Fred Peacock*	1,202	52.1	+21.5
Ratepayers	Basil Emery	777	33.7	−7.9
Liberal	Bob Lord	252	10.9	+10.9
Ecology	Melanie Hutchins	77	3.3	+3.3
Turnout			44.0	
Registered electors		5,245		
Labour hold		Swing	+14.7	

Knebworth ward
Party	Candidate	Votes	%	±%
Conservative	Alfred Grosse*	888	58.5	−1.4
Labour	Herrmann	630	41.5	+23.6
Turnout			49.6	
Registered electors		3,060		
Conservative hold		Swing	-12.5	

Letchworth East ward
Party	Candidate	Votes	%	±%
Labour	Tony McWalter*	1,238	61.9	+16.8
Conservative	Allan Brett	763	38.1	−4.3
Turnout			49.0	
Registered electors		4,084		
Labour hold		Swing	+10.6	

Letchworth Grange ward
Party	Candidate	Votes	%	±%
Labour	David Kearns*	1,348	64.4	+1.9
Conservative	Christine Barclay	746	35.6	−1.9
Turnout			42.7	
Registered electors		4,904		
Labour hold		Swing	+1.9	

Letchworth South East ward
Party	Candidate	Votes	%	±%
Labour	Rod Playford	1,432	70.9	+25.8
Conservative	Jenny Ritchie*	475	23.5	−31.4
Ecology	Elspeth Rolls	113	5.6	+5.6
Turnout			48.4	
Registered electors		4,174		
Labour gain from Conservative		Swing	+28.6	

Letchworth South West ward
Party	Candidate	Votes	%	±%
Conservative	Geoff Woods*	1,329	57.1	−9.4
Labour	Steve Spencer	997	42.8	+9.4
Turnout			57.1	
Registered electors		4,074		
Conservative hold		Swing	-9.4	

Letchworth Wilbury ward
Party	Candidate	Votes	%	±%
Labour	Ian Mantle*	1,216	54.8	+15.5
Conservative	Jeff Smith	808	36.4	−7.3
Liberal	Ian McGinlay	197	8.9	−8.1
Turnout			57.0	
Registered electors		3,896		
Labour hold		Swing	+11.4	

Royston East ward
Party	Candidate	Votes	%	±%
Conservative	Francis John Smith*	863	61.3	+3.1
Labour	Jessie Grace Etheridge	301	21.4	+0.9
Liberal	Sydney Charles McLennan	243	17.3	−4.0
Turnout			37.3	
Registered electors		3,772		
Conservative hold		Swing	+1.1	

Royston West ward
Party	Candidate	Votes	%	±%
Conservative	Terence Bernard Botfield	698	42.7	−9.2
Labour	Michael William Kernaghan	533	32.6	+7.3
Liberal	Hazel Priscilla Lord	404	24.7	+1.9
Turnout			37.3	
Registered electors		4,383		
Conservative hold		Swing	-8.3	

Weston ward
Party	Candidate	Votes	%	±%
Conservative	Robert Evans*	354	64.5	−5.4
Labour	John Schofield	195	35.5	+5.4
Turnout			49.5	
Registered electors		1,109		
Conservative hold		Swing	-5.4	

== Changes 1980–1982 ==
Three by-elections were held on 19 March 1981. The by-election in Letchworth South West ward was triggered by the death of Conservative councillor Bob Saunders. The two by-elections in Letchworth South East ward were triggered by the death of Conservative councillor John Yates and the resignation of Labour councillor Rod Playford. The Conservatives retained the Letchworth South West seat, but Labour won both Letchworth South East seats.

Letchworth South East ward
Party	Candidate	Votes	%	±%
Labour	David Evans	1,261	42.1	−28.8
Labour	Joan Kirby	1,123		
Conservative	Norman Prior	898	30.0	+6.5
Conservative	James Robertson	860		
Liberal	Robert Stevens	836	27.9	+27.9
Labour hold		Swing	-17.7	
Labour gain from Conservative		Swing		

Letchworth South West ward
Party	Candidate	Votes	%	±%
Conservative	John Talbot	977	44.0	−21.8
Liberal	William Armitage	640	28.8	+28.8
Labour	Pat Watson Blake	602	27.1	−22.2
Conservative hold		Swing	-25.3	
