= 1988 North Hertfordshire District Council election =

Council election in England

| ← 1987 | 5 May 1988 | 1990 → |

18 of 50 seats on North Hertfordshire District Council 26 seats needed for a majority
| | First party | Second party | Third party |
|---|---|---|---|
| | Con | Lab | SDP |
| Leader | Bob Flatman | Judi Billing | Tony Quinn |
| Party | Conservative | Labour | SDP |
| Seats before | 26 | 13 | 4 |
| Seats after | 27 | 13 | 4 |
| Seat change | ▲1 | Steady | Steady |
| | Fourth party | Fifth party |
| | SLD | RA |
| Party | SLD | Ratepayers |
| Seats before | 4 | 3 |
| Seats after | 3 | 3 |
| Seat change | ▼1 | Steady |
Leader before election
Bob Flatman
Conservative
Leader after election
Bob Flatman
Conservative

The 1988 North Hertfordshire District Council election was held on 5 May 1988, at the same time as other local elections across England and Scotland. There were 18 out of 50 seats on North Hertfordshire District Council up for election, being the usual third of the council plus a by-election in Codicote ward.

The Conservatives made a net gain of one seat to increase their majority on the council. The former SDP–Liberal Alliance group of eight councillors had fragmented ahead of the election; four joined the new merged party of the Social and Liberal Democrats (renamed the Liberal Democrats the following year), but the other four (including former Alliance group leader, Tony Quinn) joined the breakaway continuing Social Democratic Party opposed to the merger.

== Overall results ==
The overall results were as follows:

1988 North Hertfordshire District Council election
| Party | This election | | | Full council | | | This election | | |
| Party | Seats | Net | Seats % | Other | Total | Total % | Votes | Votes % | +/− |
|---|---|---|---|---|---|---|---|---|---|
| Conservative | 12 | ▲1 | 66.7 | 15 | 27 | 54.0 | 14,569 | 41.1 | +1.6 |
| Labour | 5 | Steady | 27.8 | 8 | 13 | 26.0 | 11,412 | 32.2 | +7.8 |
| SLD | 0 | ▼1 | 0.0 | 3 | 3 | 6.0 | 6,094 | 17.2 | -14.5 |
| SDP | 0 | Steady | 0.0 | 4 | 4 | 8.0 | 1,363 | 3.8 | New |
| Ratepayers | 1 | Steady | 5.6 | 2 | 3 | 6.0 | 1,869 | 5.3 | +1.2 |
| Green | 0 | Steady | 0.0 | 0 | 0 | 0.0 | 138 | 0.4 | 0.0 |

== Ward results ==
The results for each ward were as follows. An asterisk (*) indicates a sitting councillor standing for re-election.

Ashbrook ward
| Party | Candidate | Votes | % | ±% |
|---|---|---|---|---|
| Conservative | Michael Tatham* | 667 | 64.6 | +9.2 |
| Labour | Keith Brydon | 253 | 24.5 | −2.7 |
| SLD | Jonathan Heath | 113 | 10.9 | −6.5 |
| Turnout | | | 50.0 | |
| Registered electors | | 2,046 | | |
| Conservative hold | | Swing | +6.0 | |

Baldock ward
| Party | Candidate | Votes | % | ±% |
|---|---|---|---|---|
| Conservative | Bernard Crow | 1,595 | 50.7 | +4.0 |
| Labour | Alan Moir* | 1,327 | 42.2 | +15.1 |
| SLD | Sara Tustin | 221 | 7.0 | −19.1 |
| Turnout | | | 47.0 | |
| Registered electors | | 6,703 | | |
| Conservative gain from Labour | | Swing | -5.6 | |

Cadwell ward
| Party | Candidate | Votes | % | ±% |
|---|---|---|---|---|
| Conservative | Richard Lee | 538 | 55.1 | +17.4 |
| Labour | Charles MacNally (Charlie MacNally) | 327 | 33.5 | +6.5 |
| SLD | Richard Canning | 88 | 9.0 | −26.3 |
| SDP | Bernadette Hatch (Bernie Hatch) | 24 | 2.5 | +2.5 |
| Turnout | | | 54.0 | |
| Registered electors | | 1,801 | | |
| Conservative hold | | Swing | +5.5 | |

Codicote ward
| Party | Candidate | Votes | % | ±% |
|---|---|---|---|---|
| Conservative | Edward Ian Smith | 769 | 75.9 | +32.4 |
| Labour | Peter Read | 244 | 24.1 | −0.1 |
| Conservative hold | | Swing | +16.3 | |

The by-election in Codicote ward was triggered by the death of Conservative councillor Denis Winch.

Hitchin Bearton ward
| Party | Candidate | Votes | % | ±% |
|---|---|---|---|---|
| Labour | Judi Billing* | 1,174 | 54.1 | +14.1 |
| Conservative | Norman Frost | 624 | 28.7 | −8.4 |
| SLD | Penelope Cunningham (Penny Cunningham) | 171 | 7.9 | −15.0 |
| Ratepayers | John Edwards | 135 | 6.2 | +6.2 |
| Green | Christopher Studman | 68 | 3.1 | +3.1 |
| Turnout | | | 48.0 | |
| Registered electors | | 4,500 | | |
| Labour hold | | Swing | +11.3 | |

Hitchin Highbury ward
| Party | Candidate | Votes | % | ±% |
|---|---|---|---|---|
| Conservative | Phillip MacCormack* | 1,092 | 46.2 | −3.1 |
| SLD | Rosemary Read | 471 | 19.9 | −21.2 |
| Labour | David Tizzard | 359 | 15.2 | +5.5 |
| SDP | Carolyn Randall | 294 | 12.4 | +12.4 |
| Ratepayers | Jacqueline Tait | 150 | 6.3 | +6.3 |
| Turnout | | | 46.0 | |
| Registered electors | | 5,154 | | |
| Conservative hold | | Swing | +9.1 | |

Hitchin Oughton ward
| Party | Candidate | Votes | % | ±% |
|---|---|---|---|---|
| Labour | Joan Kirby | 1,022 | 70.5 | +19.5 |
| SLD | Michael John Edwards | 427 | 29.5 | +5.7 |
| Turnout | | | 35.0 | |
| Registered electors | | 4,225 | | |
| Labour hold | | Swing | +6.9 | |

Hitchin Priory ward
| Party | Candidate | Votes | % | ±% |
|---|---|---|---|---|
| Conservative | Francis Howett* (Frank Howett) | 832 | 65.8 | +8.7 |
| SLD | Jennifer Sefton (Jenny Sefton) | 265 | 21.0 | −6.8 |
| Labour | Roger Wood | 167 | 13.2 | −2.0 |
| Turnout | | | 46.0 | |
| Registered electors | | 2,737 | | |
| Conservative hold | | Swing | +7.8 | |

Hitchin Walsworth ward
| Party | Candidate | Votes | % | ±% |
|---|---|---|---|---|
| Ratepayers | Christopher Parker* | 1,584 | 62.0 | +13.8 |
| Labour | Roger Newby | 688 | 26.9 | +6.0 |
| SLD | Paul Clark | 213 | 8.3 | −5.0 |
| Green | Elizabeth Ann Roberts | 70 | 2.7 | +1.1 |
| Turnout | | | 42.0 | |
| Registered electors | | 6,096 | | |
| Ratepayers hold | | Swing | +3.9 | |

Knebworth ward
| Party | Candidate | Votes | % | ±% |
|---|---|---|---|---|
| Conservative | Margaret Hilton* | 917 | 62.4 | +4.8 |
| SLD | Michael Stiff (Mike Stiff) | 286 | 19.5 | −6.4 |
| Labour | Jack Nelson | 266 | 18.1 | +1.6 |
| Turnout | | | 43.0 | |
| Registered electors | | 3,416 | | |
| Conservative hold | | Swing | +5.6 | |

Letchworth East ward
| Party | Candidate | Votes | % | ±% |
|---|---|---|---|---|
| Labour | Lorna Kercher | 1,077 | 53.2 | +11.7 |
| Conservative | David Langridge | 607 | 30.0 | +4.1 |
| SLD | Keith Marr | 340 | 16.8 | −15.7 |
| Turnout | | | 48.0 | |
| Registered electors | | 4,199 | | |
| Labour hold | | Swing | +3.8 | |

Letchworth Grange ward
| Party | Candidate | Votes | % | ±% |
|---|---|---|---|---|
| Labour | David Kearns* | 1,302 | 42.6 | +8.6 |
| Conservative | Michael Muir | 861 | 28.2 | +1.1 |
| SLD | Alison Kingman | 729 | 23.9 | −12.6 |
| SDP | Sue Sinclair | 164 | 5.4 | +5.4 |
| Turnout | | | 58.0 | |
| Registered electors | | 5,215 | | |
| Labour hold | | Swing | +3.8 | |

Letchworth South East ward
| Party | Candidate | Votes | % | ±% |
|---|---|---|---|---|
| Conservative | Pauline Wood | 1,158 | 39.1 | +5.8 |
| Labour | David Evans | 812 | 27.4 | +8.2 |
| SDP | James Bray | 707 | 23.9 | +23.9 |
| SLD | Harry Shipley | 287 | 9.7 | −37.9 |
| Turnout | | | 49.0 | |
| Registered electors | | 6,004 | | |
| Conservative hold | | Swing | -1.2 | |

Letchworth South West ward
| Party | Candidate | Votes | % | ±% |
|---|---|---|---|---|
| Conservative | Geoffrey Woods* (Geoff Woods) | 1,203 | 48.3 | −3.7 |
| SLD | Ian Simpson | 697 | 28.0 | −10.0 |
| Labour | Tony McWalter | 418 | 16.8 | +6.7 |
| SDP | Robert Ashton | 174 | 7.0 | +7.0 |
| Turnout | | | 54.0 | |
| Registered electors | | 4,642 | | |
| Conservative hold | | Swing | +3.2 | |

Letchworth Wilbury ward
| Party | Candidate | Votes | % | ±% |
|---|---|---|---|---|
| Labour | Peter Mardell | 1,010 | 46.1 | +8.1 |
| Conservative | Ray Bloxham* | 941 | 42.9 | −0.2 |
| SLD | Derek Hunter | 242 | 11.0 | −7.9 |
| Turnout | | | 54.0 | |
| Registered electors | | 4,036 | | |
| Labour gain from Conservative | | Swing | +4.2 | |

Royston East ward
| Party | Candidate | Votes | % | ±% |
|---|---|---|---|---|
| Conservative | Francis John Smith* | 1,146 | 58.3 | +6.1 |
| SLD | Jennifer Comley | 493 | 25.1 | −9.3 |
| Labour | Christopher Hills | 328 | 16.7 | +3.2 |
| Turnout | | | 47.0 | |
| Registered electors | | 4,170 | | |
| Conservative hold | | Swing | +7.7 | |

Royston West ward
| Party | Candidate | Votes | % | ±% |
|---|---|---|---|---|
| Conservative | Mark Hughes | 1,216 | 46.8 | −1.7 |
| SLD | Gwyn Hardwicke | 855 | 32.9 | −2.2 |
| Labour | Robin King | 525 | 20.2 | +3.9 |
| Turnout | | | 46.0 | |
| Registered electors | | 5,652 | | |
| Conservative gain from SLD | | Swing | +0.3 | |

Weston ward
| Party | Candidate | Votes | % | ±% |
|---|---|---|---|---|
| Conservative | Robert Evans* | 403 | 56.6 | −4.3 |
| SLD | Stephen Jarvis | 196 | 27.5 | +4.6 |
| Labour | Rodney Leete | 113 | 15.9 | −0.3 |
| Turnout | | | 57.0 | |
| Registered electors | | 1,248 | | |
| Conservative hold | | Swing | -4.5 | |

== Changes 1988–1990 ==
Royston West ward by-election, 27 October 1988
| Party | Candidate | Votes | % | ±% |
|---|---|---|---|---|
| Conservative | Timothy Doyle (Tim Doyle) | 801 | 46.6 | −0.2 |
| SLD | Jenny Comley | 455 | 26.5 | −6.5 |
| Labour | Robin King | 363 | 21.1 | +0.9 |
| SDP | Michael Harrison | 100 | 5.8 | +5.8 |
| Turnout | | | 100.0 | |
| Registered electors | | | | |
| Conservative gain from SLD | | Swing | +3.2 | |

The Royston West by-election was triggered by the resignation of Social and Liberal Democrat councillor Fran Bate. Tim Doyle won the seat for the Conservatives.

Hitchin Priory ward by-election, 22 February 1990
| Party | Candidate | Votes | % | ±% |
|---|---|---|---|---|
| Conservative | Richard Thake | | | |
| Liberal Democrats | Stephen Harbron | | | |
| Labour | David Billing | | | |
| Turnout | | | | |
| Registered electors | | | | |
| Conservative hold | | Swing | | |

The Hitchin Priory by-election was triggered by the death of Conservative councillor Frank Howett. The seat was retained for the Conservatives by Richard Thake. The number of votes was not reported, but it was said that the Conservative vote was down 20% from the last time the seat was contested and the Liberal Democrat share of the vote was 33%.
