= 1987 North Hertfordshire District Council election =

Council election in England

← 1986	7 May 1987	1988 →

17 of 50 seats on North Hertfordshire District Council 26 seats needed for a majority
	First party	Second party
	Con	Lab
Leader	Bob Flatman
Party	Conservative	Labour
Seats before	26	14
Seats after	26	13
Seat change	Steady	▼1
	Third party	Fourth party
	All	RA
Party	Alliance	Ratepayers
Seats before	7	3
Seats after	8	3
Seat change	▲1	Steady
Leader before election
Bob Flatman
Conservative
Leader after election
Bob Flatman
Conservative

The 1987 North Hertfordshire District Council election was held on 7 May 1987, at the same time as other local elections across England and Wales. There were 17 out of 50 seats on North Hertfordshire District Council up for election, being the usual third of the council.

The Conservatives retained their narrow majority on the council.

== Overall results ==
The overall results were as follows:

1987 North Hertfordshire District Council election
Party	This election			Full council			This election		
Party	Seats	Net	Seats %	Other	Total	Total %	Votes	Votes %	+/−
Conservative	10	Steady	58.8	16	26	52.0	14,822	39.5	+7.2
Alliance	3	▲1	17.6	5	8	16.0	11,872	31.6	-2.0
Labour	3	▼1	17.6	10	13	26.0	9,167	24.4	-4.7
Ratepayers	1	Steady	5.9	2	3	6.0	1,523	4.1	+0.6
Green	0	Steady	0.0	0	0	0.0	130	0.3	-0.1

== Ward results ==
The results for each ward were as follows. An asterisk (*) indicates a sitting councillor standing for re-election.

Arbury ward
Party	Candidate	Votes	%	±%
Alliance	Simon Marlow	574	46.1	+2.0
Conservative	John Sheldrick*	551	44.3	−4.1
Labour	Marilyn Leete	120	9.6	+2.1
Turnout			68.9	
Registered electors		1,810		
Alliance gain from Conservative		Swing	+3.1	

Baldock ward
Party	Candidate	Votes	%	±%
Conservative	Alan Evens*	1,669	46.8	+10.3
Labour	Michael Donoghue	968	27.1	−6.9
Alliance	Robert Young (Bob Young)	931	26.1	−3.5
Turnout			55.2	
Registered electors		6,483		
Conservative hold		Swing	+8.6	

Hitchin Bearton ward
Party	Candidate	Votes	%	±%
Labour	Teresa Trangmar	959	39.9	−10.7
Conservative	Norman Frost	893	37.2	+5.0
Alliance	Penelope Cunningham (Penny Cunningham)	550	22.9	+5.7
Turnout			52.9	
Registered electors		4,554		
Labour gain from Conservative		Swing	-7.9	

Hitchin Highbury ward
Party	Candidate	Votes	%	±%
Conservative	Beryl Wearmouth*	1,446	49.2	+9.9
Alliance	Aileen Burford-Mason	1,208	41.1	−5.1
Labour	David Tizzard	284	9.7	−4.7
Turnout			56.1	
Registered electors		5,163		
Conservative hold		Swing	+7.5	

Hitchin Oughton ward
Party	Candidate	Votes	%	±%
Labour	Audrey Carss*	1,030	51.1	−1.7
Conservative	Ronald Jack	508	25.2	+7.8
Alliance	Jennifer Sefton (Jenny Sefton)	479	23.7	−6.1
Turnout			46.1	
Registered electors		4,318		
Labour hold		Swing	-4.8	

Hitchin Walsworth ward
Party	Candidate	Votes	%	±%
Ratepayers	Ken Logan*	1,523	48.2	+2.6
Labour	Veronica Sharp	662	20.9	−15.1
Conservative	Barry West	504	15.9	+15.9
Alliance	Hazel Kelly (Kay Kelly)	422	13.3	−2.0
Green	Elizabeth Roberts	52	1.6	−1.5
Turnout			52.0	
Registered electors		6,065		
Ratepayers hold		Swing	+8.9	

Hitchwood ward
Party	Candidate	Votes	%	±%
Conservative	John Raffell*	565	67.8	+5.8
Alliance	Richard Canning	134	16.1	−11.9
Labour	Tony McWalter	134	16.1	+6.2
Turnout			60.5	
Registered electors		1,381		
Conservative hold		Swing	+8.9	

Hoo ward
Party	Candidate	Votes	%	±%
Conservative	John Jackson*	439	48.9	−1.0
Labour	Stephen MacDonald	242	27.0	−4.8
Alliance	William Rodney Hampson (Rodney Hampson)	216	24.1	+5.8
Turnout			59.0	
Registered electors		1,523		
Conservative hold		Swing	+1.9	

Letchworth East ward
Party	Candidate	Votes	%	±%
Labour	William Charles Bifield* (Charles Bifield)	1,043	41.6	+2.1
Alliance	Keith Marr	816	32.5	−6.0
Conservative	John Bush	651	25.9	+3.9
Turnout			60.0	
Registered electors		4,192		
Labour hold		Swing	+4.1	

Letchworth Grange ward
Party	Candidate	Votes	%	±%
Alliance	Bonita Thomson	1,114	36.4	−1.4
Labour	Peter Mardell	1,040	34.0	−8.2
Conservative	James Hannah (Jim Hannah)	827	27.0	+9.3
Green	Ian Barratt	78	2.5	+0.3
Turnout			58.1	
Registered electors		5,275		
Alliance gain from Labour		Swing	+3.4	

Letchworth South East ward
Party	Candidate	Votes	%	±%
Alliance	Tony Quinn*	1,743	47.6	−2.2
Conservative	Michael Muir	1,217	33.2	+6.8
Labour	Lorna Kercher	702	19.2	−4.7
Turnout			61.0	
Registered electors		6,021		
Alliance hold		Swing	-4.5	

Letchworth South West ward
Party	Candidate	Votes	%	±%
Conservative	David Jones	1,556	51.9	+2.2
Alliance	Ian Simpson	1,139	38.0	−2.8
Labour	Jane Newbury	301	10.0	+0.6
Turnout			64.5	
Registered electors		4,651		
Conservative gain from Alliance		Swing	+2.5	

Letchworth Wilbury ward
Party	Candidate	Votes	%	±%
Conservative	Keith Emsall	1,072	43.1	+8.3
Labour	David Evans	944	37.9	−5.3
Alliance	Derek Hunter	472	19.0	−3.0
Turnout			61.8	
Registered electors		4,030		
Conservative gain from Labour		Swing	+6.8	

Newsells ward
Party	Candidate	Votes	%	±%
Conservative	Robert Wilkerson* (Bob Wilkerson)	532	62.1	−17.6
Alliance	Rowena Gardiner	279	32.6	+32.6
Labour	Christopher Hills (Chris Hills)	45	5.3	−15.0
Turnout			64.0	
Registered electors		1,329		
Conservative hold		Swing	-25.1	

Offa ward
Party	Candidate	Votes	%	±%
Conservative	Lynne Faulkner* (Note: Previously elected in 1983 as Lynne Jackson)	451	43.2	−4.7
Alliance	Michael Jackson (Mike Jackson)	443	42.4	+15.9
Labour	John Saunders	150	14.4	−11.3
Turnout			68.0	
Registered electors		1,522		
Conservative hold		Swing	-10.3	

Royston West ward
Party	Candidate	Votes	%	±%
Conservative	Leo Doyle*	1,490	48.5	+8.7
Alliance	Gwyn Hardwicke	1,079	35.1	−5.0
Labour	Dave Bowles	501	16.3	−3.7
Turnout			55.0	
Registered electors		5,593		
Conservative hold		Swing	+6.9	

Sandon ward
Party	Candidate	Votes	%	±%
Conservative	Harold Greenfield	451	58.9	−19.2
Alliance	Sandra Stainthorpe	273	35.6	+23.6
Labour	William Adams (Bill Adams)	42	5.5	−4.4
Turnout			67.0	
Registered electors		1,144		
Conservative hold		Swing	-21.4	
