= 1983 North Hertfordshire District Council election =

Council election in England

← 1982	5 May 1983	1984 →

18 of 50 seats on North Hertfordshire District Council 26 seats needed for a majority
	First party	Second party	Third party
	Con	Lab	Ind
Leader	Bob Flatman	Jim Reilly
Party	Conservative	Labour	Independent
Seats before	32	14	2
Seats after	30	15	2
Seat change	▼2	▲1	Steady
	Fourth party	Fifth party
	RA	SDP
Party	Ratepayers	SDP
Seats before	2	0
Seats after	2	1
Seat change	Steady	▲1
Leader before election
Bob Flatman
Conservative
Leader after election
Bob Flatman
Conservative

The 1983 North Hertfordshire District Council election was held on 5 May 1983, at the same time as other local elections across England and Wales. There were 18 out of 50 seats on North Hertfordshire District Council up for election, being the usual third of the council plus a by-election in Letchworth East ward.

== Overall results ==
The overall results were as follows:

1983 North Hertfordshire District Council election
Party	This election			Full council			This election		
Party	Seats	Net	Seats %	Other	Total	Total %	Votes	Votes %	+/−
Conservative	11	▼2	61.1	19	30	60.0	14,340	42.1	+0.8
Labour	5	▲1	27.8	10	15	27.8	9,933	29.1	+1.8
Alliance	1	▲1	5.6	0	1	2.0	8,191	24.0	-2.0
Ratepayers	1	Steady	5.6	1	2	4.0	1,614	4.7	+1.2
Independent	0	Steady	0.0	2	2	4.0	0	0.0	n/a

Liberal and SDP votes are counted together in the summary above as part of the Alliance. In the ward results below, where the individual party affiliation of Alliance candidates was reported it is shown instead.

== Ward results ==
The results for each ward were as follows. An asterisk(*) indicates a sitting councillor standing for re-election.

Arbury ward
Party	Candidate	Votes	%	±%
Conservative	John Sheldrick*	582	48.3	+2.2
Alliance	Anne Glenys Travis	531	44.1	+3.7
Labour	Nigel Percival	91	7.6	−5.9
Turnout			66.5	
Registered electors		1,811		
Conservative hold		Swing	-0.8	

Baldock ward
Party	Candidate	Votes	%	±%
Conservative	Alan Evens*	1,238	47.3	+6.9
Labour	Roger McFall	933	35.6	+4.3
Alliance	Mike Pritchett	448	17.1	−8.9
Turnout			50.4	
Registered electors		5,196		
Conservative hold		Swing	+1.3	

Hitchin Bearton ward
Party	Candidate	Votes	%	±%
Conservative	David Roberts*	981	41.6	+1.7
Labour	Harry Smith	882	37.4	+1.2
Alliance	Harry Shipley	396	16.8	−7.0
Residents	Basil St John Emery	97	4.1	+4.1
Turnout			54.2	
Registered electors		4,347		
Conservative hold		Swing	+0.3	

Hitchin Highbury ward
Party	Candidate	Votes	%	±%
Conservative	Beryl Wearmouth*	1,626	65.6	+10.8
SDP	Mary Burton	502	20.3	−12.9
Labour	Teresa Trangmar	350	14.1	+2.2
Turnout			48.1	
Registered electors		5,047		
Conservative hold		Swing	-3.4	

Hitchin Oughton ward
Party	Candidate	Votes	%	±%
Labour	Audrey Carss*	1,070	54.3	+6.2
Conservative	Derrick Ashley	641	32.5	+1.4
Alliance	Lorna Boardman	259	13.1	−7.6
Turnout			44.4	
Registered electors		4,437		
Labour hold		Swing	+2.4	

Hitchin Walsworth ward
Party	Candidate	Votes	%	±%
Residents	Ken Logan*	1,517	46.4	+1.5
Labour	Keith Ruff	811	24.8	−5.3
Conservative	John Crow	612	18.7	+18.7
Alliance	Hugh Kelliher	329	10.1	−14.9
Turnout			56.2	
Registered electors		5,817		
Ratepayers hold		Swing	+3.4	

Hitchwood ward
Party	Candidate	Votes	%	±%
Conservative	John Raffell*	463	62.1	−14.8
Alliance	Edward Wilson	209	28.0	+28.0
Labour	Jenny Marr	74	9.9	−13.3
Turnout			55.3	
Registered electors		1,349		
Conservative hold		Swing	-21.4	

Hoo ward
Party	Candidate	Votes	%	±%
Conservative	John Jackson	430	49.9	−13.5
Labour	David Kendall	274	31.8	−4.7
Alliance	Celia Lord	157	18.2	+18.2
Turnout			55.4	
Registered electors		1,554		
Conservative hold		Swing	-4.4	

Letchworth East ward
Party	Candidate	Votes	%	±%
Labour	Charles Bifield	956	40.1	−0.3
Labour	Headley Parkins*	910		
Alliance	Martin Fisher	768	32.2	+0.3
Alliance	Hans Mulder	717		
Conservative	Nicholas King	660	27.7	0.0
Conservative	David Langridge	655		
Turnout			62.3	
Registered electors		4,168		
Labour hold		Swing	-0.3	
Labour hold		Swing		

The by-election in Letchworth East ward was triggered by the resignation of Labour councillor Tony McWalter.

Letchworth Grange ward
Party	Candidate	Votes	%	±%
Labour	Liz Leonard	1,017	37.2	−1.3
Alliance	Brian Nicholson	954	34.9	+0.2
Conservative	John McKenna	764	27.9	+1.0
Turnout			53.8	
Registered electors		5,084		
Labour hold		Swing	-0.8	

Letchworth South East ward
Party	Candidate	Votes	%	±%
SDP	Tony Quinn	1,355	37.6	+4.7
Conservative	Gordon Whalley	1,308	36.3	+0.4
Labour	Joan Kirby	940	26.1	−5.1
Turnout			61.2	
Registered electors		5,887		
SDP gain from Conservative		Swing	+2.2	

Letchworth South West ward
Party	Candidate	Votes	%	±%
Conservative	John Talbot*	1,400	55.0	−8.6
Labour	Steve Spencer	617	24.2	+11.4
Liberal	Rosemary Ryden	530	20.8	−2.8
Turnout			58.8	
Registered electors		4,332		
Conservative hold		Swing	-10.0	

Letchworth Wilbury ward
Party	Candidate	Votes	%	±%
Labour	Stuart Murray	1,162	45.1	+6.0
Conservative	Ray Bloxham*	1,080	42.0	+1.0
Alliance	Mary Marsh	332	12.9	−7.1
Turnout			64.3	
Registered electors		4,003		
Labour gain from Conservative		Swing	+2.5	

Newsells ward
Party	Candidate	Votes	%	±%
Conservative	Robert Wilkerson* (Bob Wilkerson)	507	79.7	+0.1
Labour	Michael Kernaghan (Mick Kernaghan)	129	20.3	−0.1
Turnout			49.8	
Registered electors		1,276		
Conservative hold		Swing	+0.1	

Offa ward
Party	Candidate	Votes	%	±%
Conservative	Lynne Jackson	426	47.9	+2.9
Alliance	Andy Hofton	236	26.5	+1.2
Labour	John Mayo	228	25.6	−4.1
Turnout			59.8	
Registered electors		1,488		
Conservative hold		Swing	+0.9	

Royston West ward
Party	Candidate	Votes	%	±%
Conservative	Leo Doyle	1,115	43.6	−11.6
Alliance	Hazel Lord	1,107	43.3	+17.2
Labour	Jessie Etheridge	335	13.1	−5.6
Turnout			50.7	
Registered electors		5,045		
Conservative hold		Swing	-14.4	

Sandon ward
Party	Candidate	Votes	%	±%
Conservative	Patricia Toulson (Patsy Toulson)	507	78.1	−4.4
Alliance	Patrick Short	78	12.0	+12.0
Labour	Philip Davies (Phil Davies)	64	9.9	−7.6
Turnout			59.8	
Registered electors		1,085		
Conservative hold		Swing	-8.2	
