= 1999 North Hertfordshire District Council election =

Council election in England

← 1998	6 May 1999	2000 →

All 49 seats on North Hertfordshire District Council 25 seats needed for a majority
	First party	Second party	Third party
	Con	Lab	LD
Leader	F. John Smith	David Kearns	Ian Simpson
Party	Conservative	Labour	Liberal Democrats
Seats before	17	26	6
Seats after	28	18	3
Seat change	▲11	▼8	▼3
Leader before election
David Kearns
Labour
Leader after election
F. John Smith
Conservative

The 1999 North Hertfordshire District Council election was held on 6 May 1999, at the same time as other local elections across Britain. All 49 seats on North Hertfordshire District Council were up for election following changes to ward boundaries.

Labour lost control of the council to the Conservatives at the election, with the Conservative leader, F. John Smith, becoming leader of the council, taking the role from the Labour leader, David Kearns. The Liberal Democrat leader, Ian Simpson, lost his seat at the election and was replaced as group leader after the election by Steve Jarvis.

== Overall results ==
The overall results were as follows:

North Hertfordshire District Council Election, 1999
Party	Seats	Gains	Losses	Net gain/loss	Seats %	Votes %	Votes	+/−
Conservative	28			▲11	57.1	43.8	15,710	+2.8
Labour	18			▼8	36.7	31.9	11,420	-5.1
Liberal Democrats	3			▼3	6.1	20.2	7,247	-0.3
Green	0				0	1.8	655	+0.7
Independent	0			▼1	0	1.8	631	+1.8
Natural Law	0				0	0.5	170	+0.1

== Ward results ==
The results for each ward were as follows. An asterisk(*) indicates a sitting councillor standing for re-election.

Arbury ward
Party	Candidate	Votes	%	±%
Conservative	Andrew Dempster Young*	703	65.5	
Liberal Democrats	Roger Lindsay Pritchard	241	22.5	
Labour	Joanna Ruth White	129	12.0	
Turnout			54.16	
Registered electors		1,981		
Conservative hold		Swing		

Baldock East ward
Party	Candidate	Votes	%	±%
Conservative	Michael Edwin Weeks	256	56.4	
Labour	John Merson	101	22.2	
Liberal Democrats	Marilyn Roberta Kirkland	97	21.4	
Turnout			25.6	
Registered electors		1,767		
Conservative win (new seat)				

Baldock Town ward
Party	Candidate	Votes	%	±%
Conservative	Bernard Crow*	1,025	43.7	
Conservative	Michael Robert Mackenzie Muir	859		
Conservative	Ian Knighton	842		
Labour	Brian Derbyshire*	787	33.5	
Labour	Roger Miller McFall*	706		
Labour	Andrew Robert Milne*	577		
Independent	Peter Alan Deacon	317	13.5	
Liberal Democrats	John Stephen White	217	9.2	
Liberal Democrats	Samantha Turner	177		
Turnout			32.9	
Registered electors		5,702		
Conservative win (new seat)				
Conservative win (new seat)				
Conservative win (new seat)				

Cadwell ward
Party	Candidate	Votes	%	±%
Conservative	Patricia Winifred Gibbs (Tricia Gibbs)	450	51.1	
Labour	Anne Elizabeth Sobek*	318	36.1	
Liberal Democrats	Andrew Mark Derwent	113	12.8	
Turnout			48.14	
Registered electors		1,832		
Conservative gain from Labour		Swing		

Codicote ward
Party	Candidate	Votes	%	±%
Conservative	Luke Michael Joseph La Plain*	565	66.2	
Labour	Frederick George Peacock	195	22.9	
Liberal Democrats	Richard Stephen Grant Stanley	93	10.9	
Turnout			41.9	
Registered electors		2,039		
Conservative hold		Swing		

Ermine ward
Party	Candidate	Votes	%	±%
Conservative	Howard Maycroft Marshall	621	63.3	
Liberal Democrats	Jean Pooley	233	23.8	
Labour	Dorothy Fryer	127	12.9	
Turnout			50.7	
Registered electors		1,940		
Conservative win (new seat)				

Graveley and Wymondley ward
Party	Candidate	Votes	%	±%
Liberal Democrats	Sally Margaret Jarvis (Sal Jarvis)	379	60.5	
Conservative	Cheryl Kathleen Peers	192	30.7	
Labour	Robert Fergus Whatson	55	8.8	
Turnout			48.6	
Registered electors		1,289		
Liberal Democrats win (new seat)				

Hitchin Bearton ward
Party	Candidate	Votes	%	±%
Labour	Judi Billing*	933	49.2	
Labour	Jennifer Alice Marr* (Jenny Marr)	892		
Labour	Martin John Stears*	764		
Conservative	Patricia Ann Cherry	504	26.6	
Conservative	Charles Spencer Bunker	502		
Conservative	Mark Philip Spencer Bunker	498		
Green	Nigel Peter Howitt	179	9.4	
Liberal Democrats	Keith Catchpole	173	9.1	
Natural Law	David Richard Hunter Cooke	108	5.7	
Natural Law	Donna Louise Hawkins	66		
Natural Law	Lesley Susan Relph	58		
Turnout			30.32	
Registered electors		5,142		
Labour hold		Swing		
Labour hold		Swing		
Labour hold		Swing		

Hitchin Highbury ward
Party	Candidate	Votes	%	±%
Conservative	Alvaro Damiani* (Al Damiani)	1,248	46.4	
Conservative	Paul Nigel Dee	1,199		
Conservative	Lesley Avril Lambourn Greenwood	1,153		
Liberal Democrats	Paul Clark*	830	30.9	
Liberal Democrats	Robert George Lord	772		
Liberal Democrats	David Shirley	673		
Labour	Jonathan Victor Newham	454	16.9	
Green	Lydia Helen Howitt	156	5.8	
Turnout			5.8	
Registered electors		5,492		
Conservative hold		Swing		
Conservative gain from Liberal Democrats		Swing		
Conservative gain from Liberal Democrats		Swing		

Hitchin Oughton ward
Party	Candidate	Votes	%	±%
Labour	Audrey Emmie Carss*	721	65.0	
Labour	Joan Irene Kirby*	678		
Conservative	Nigel Kenneth Brook	222	20.0	
Conservative	Penelope Mary Brook	209		
Liberal Democrats	Ingeborg Gudrun Sutcliffe	100	9.0	
Green	Stuart Madgin	66	6.0	
Turnout			26.4	
Registered electors		3,778		
Labour hold		Swing		
Labour hold		Swing		

Hitchin Priory ward
Party	Candidate	Votes	%	±%
Conservative	Derrick Alan Ashley*	1,099	58.7	
Conservative	Richard Arthur Charles Thake*	1,041		
Labour	David Edward Billing	417	22.3	
Liberal Democrats	John Paul Winder	355	19.0	
Turnout			34.3	
Registered electors		4,015		
Conservative hold		Swing		
Conservative hold		Swing		

Hitchin Walsworth ward
Party	Candidate	Votes	%	±%
Conservative	James Ashmore	876	40.6	
Labour	Sandra May Lunn*	855	39.6	
Conservative	Bernard Frank James Lovewell	852		
Conservative	Anthony Patrick Strong	825		
Labour	Derek Nigel Sheard	792		
Labour	Peter Simon Terry*	779		
Liberal Democrats	Margaret Cecily Thomas	203	9.4	
Green	George Winston Howe	163	7.5	
Liberal Democrats	Ethel Edith Westoby	162		
Natural Law	Russell Pearson Howard	62	2.9	
Turnout			35.5	
Registered electors		5,528		
Conservative gain from Labour		Swing		
Labour hold		Swing		
Conservative gain from Labour		Swing		

Hitchwood ward
Party	Candidate	Votes	%	±%
Conservative	Alan Thomas Calder	656	75.1	
Labour	Paul John Charles Hetherington	218	24.9	
Turnout			43.6	
Registered electors		2,006		
Conservative hold		Swing		

Hoo ward
Party	Candidate	Votes	%	±%
Conservative	David John Barnard*	538	55.8	
Labour	Roger Aubrey Wood*	426	44.2	
Turnout			53.6	
Registered electors		1,797		
Conservative gain from Labour		Swing		

Kimpton ward
Party	Candidate	Votes	%	±%
Conservative	David John Horrell*	485	79.1	
Labour	Rene Rae Gardner	128	20.9	
Turnout			35.8	
Registered electors		1,709		
Conservative hold		Swing		

Knebworth ward
Party	Candidate	Votes	%	±%
Conservative	Jane Elizabeth Gray*	919	58.5	
Conservative	Ferrers Robin Bruce Wordsworth (Robin Wordsworth)	892		
Labour	Timothy Liddy	352	22.4	
Liberal Democrats	Michael Stiff	300	19.1	
Turnout			31.02	
Registered electors		3,970		
Conservative hold		Swing		
Conservative hold		Swing		

Letchworth East ward
Party	Candidate	Votes	%	±%
Labour	Arthur Jarman*	861	50.7	
Labour	Anthony Robert Hartley*	849		
Labour	Lorna Rose Kercher*	824		
Conservative	Elizabeth Allen	486	28.6	
Conservative	Robin Charles Maurice Harbord	486		
Conservative	Adam Joshua Wilson	437		
Liberal Democrats	Martin Gammell	261	15.4	
Liberal Democrats	Paul Francis Booton	256		
Liberal Democrats	Arthur Gilbert Ramsay Thomson	222		
Green	Eric Morris Blakeley	91	5.4	
Turnout			29.6	
Registered electors		5,337		
Labour hold		Swing		
Labour hold		Swing		
Labour hold		Swing		

Letchworth Grange ward
Party	Candidate	Votes	%	±%
Labour	David Peter Kearns*	991	61.1	
Labour	Peter Anthony Mardell*	909		
Labour	David Morris*	896		
Conservative	Judith Lindsey Gower	416	25.6	
Conservative	George Brunton Reith	405		
Conservative	Richard Edward Markiewicz	388		
Liberal Democrats	Robin Hall	216	13.3	
Liberal Democrats	Nicholas Butcher	202		
Liberal Democrats	Natasha Winder	183		
Turnout			29.6	
Registered electors		5,177		
Labour hold		Swing		
Labour hold		Swing		
Labour hold		Swing		

Letchworth South East ward
Party	Candidate	Votes	%	±%
Labour	John James Wilkinson* (Jack Wilkinson)	847	45.1	
Labour	Nigel Edward Agar*	812		
Labour	Jean Andrews*	802		
Conservative	John Finbarr Barry	645	34.3	
Conservative	Carole Anne McNelliey	643		
Conservative	Gordon Raymond Whalley	616		
Liberal Democrats	Jean Phyllis Leonard	386	20.6	
Liberal Democrats	John Winder	348		
Liberal Democrats	Murray Frank Turner	333		
Turnout			34.6	
Registered electors		5,229		
Labour hold		Swing		
Labour hold		Swing		
Labour hold		Swing		

Letchworth South West ward
Party	Candidate	Votes	%	±%
Conservative	Lynda Ann Needham*	1,380	45.1	
Conservative	Neil Alexander Redfern	1,239		
Liberal Democrats	Alison Elaine Kingman*	1,229	40.2	
Conservative	Raymond Lawrence Shakespeare-Smith	1,190		
Liberal Democrats	Ian Simpson*	1,129		
Liberal Democrats	Andrew Ircha	1,039		
Labour	Jacqueline Brigitte Hartley	452	14.8	
Turnout			50.9	
Registered electors		5,615		
Conservative hold		Swing		
Conservative gain from Liberal Democrats		Swing		
Liberal Democrats hold		Swing		

Letchworth Wilbury ward
Party	Candidate	Votes	%	±%
Labour	Ian Mantle*	729	63.0	
Labour	Gary Thomas Grindal*	720		
Conservative	Stephen Laurence Paul	302	26.1	
Conservative	Jessica Christian Dorothy Thomson	289		
Liberal Democrats	Marion Evelyn Minards-Gammell	127	11.0	
Liberal Democrats	Ursula Winder	114		
Turnout			28.29	
Registered electors		4,032		
Labour hold		Swing		
Labour hold		Swing		

Offa ward
Party	Candidate	Votes	%	±%
Conservative	Claire Patricia Annette Strong*	459	60.1	
Labour	Jean Elizabeth Ann Wood	161	21.1	
Liberal Democrats	Peter Donald Johnson	144	18.8	
Turnout			48.34	
Registered electors		1,597		
Conservative hold		Swing		

Royston Heath ward
Party	Candidate	Votes	%	±%
Conservative	Peter Colin Weston Burt*	671	50.1	
Conservative	Rodney Victor Kennedy (Rod Kennedy)	657		
Liberal Democrats	John Raymond Ledden	338	25.2	
Labour	Maureen Dale-Molloy	331	24.7	
Labour	Kenneth Garland	327		
Liberal Democrats	John Noel Rose	266		
Turnout			33.04	
Registered electors		3,919		
Conservative win (new seat)				
Conservative win (new seat)				

Royston Meridian ward
Party	Candidate	Votes	%	±%
Conservative	Anthony Frederick Hunter (Tony Hunter)	561	47.9	
Conservative	Francis John Smith* (John Smith)	560		
Labour	Robin King	338	28.9	
Labour	Joan Herbert	336		
Liberal Democrats	Patricia Anne Baxter	271	23.2	
Liberal Democrats	Anthony William Johnson	215		
Turnout			34.1	
Registered electors		3,324		
Conservative win (new seat)				
Conservative win (new seat)				

Royston Palace ward
Party	Candidate	Votes	%	±%
Labour	Leslie Baker* (Les Baker)	463	37.9	
Conservative	Martin John Beaver	431	35.2	
Conservative	Fiona Ronan Greenwood	418		
Labour	Vaughan West	361		
Liberal Democrats	Caroline Elizabeth Coates	329	26.9	
Liberal Democrats	Eric Clifford Harlow	289		
Turnout			30.3	
Registered electors		3,780		
Labour win (new seat)				
Conservative win (new seat)				

Weston and Sandon ward
Party	Candidate	Votes	%	±%
Liberal Democrats	Stephen Kenneth Jarvis* (Steve Jarvis)	612	64.5	
Independent	John Peter Cherry	314	33.1	
Labour	Natasha Louise Hetherington	23	2.4	
Turnout			59.4	
Registered electors		1,599		
Liberal Democrats win (new seat)				
