= 1990 North Hertfordshire District Council election =

Council election in England

← 1988	3 May 1990	1991 →

16 of 50 seats on North Hertfordshire District Council 26 seats needed for a majority
	First party	Second party	Third party
	Con	Lab	RA
Leader	Bob Flatman
Party	Conservative	Labour	Ratepayers
Seats before	28	13	3
Seats after	29	15	3
Seat change	▲1	▲2	Steady
	Fourth party	Fifth party
	LD	SDP
Party	Liberal Democrats	SDP
Seats before	2	4
Seats after	2	1
Seat change	Steady	▼3
Leader before election
Bob Flatman
Conservative
Leader after election
Bob Flatman
Conservative

The 1990 North Hertfordshire District Council election was held on 3 May 1990, at the same time as other local elections across England and Scotland. There were 16 out of 50 seats on North Hertfordshire District Council up for election, being the usual third of the council.

Labour took most votes, gaining two extra seats. The Conservatives also gained a seat, increasing their majority on the council. The continuing Social Democratic Party lost every seat it was defending, leaving it with just one seat on the council. With poor results across the country the party disbanded shortly after the election. The one remaining SDP councillor in North Hertfordshire was Tony Quinn, whose term ran until 1991; following the demise of his party he joined Labour for the remainder of his term.

== Overall results ==
The overall results were as follows:

1990 North Hertfordshire District Council election
Party	This election			Full council			This election		
Party	Seats	Net	Seats %	Other	Total	Total %	Votes	Votes %	+/−
Labour	7	▲2	43.8	8	15	30.0	16,522	43.8	+11.6
Conservative	8	▲1	50.0	21	29	58.0	14,248	37.8	-3.3
Liberal Democrats	0	Steady	0.0	2	2	4.0	3,263	8.6	-8.5
Ratepayers	1	Steady	6.3	2	3	6.0	1,423	3.8	-1.5
SDP	0	▼3	0.0	1	1	2.0	1,278	3.4	-0.5
Green	0	Steady	0.0	0	0	0.0	799	2.1	+1.7
Independent	0	Steady	0.0	0	0	0.0	204	0.5	New

== Ward results ==
The results for each ward were as follows. An asterisk (*) indicates a sitting councillor standing for re-election.

Baldock ward
Party	Candidate	Votes	%	±%
Labour	Michael John Parlour (Mick Parlour)	1,713	52.2	+10.0
Conservative	Mark Wilfred Seaman Hill	1,569	47.8	−2.9
Turnout			47.2	
Registered electors		6,953		
Labour gain from Conservative		Swing	+6.5	

Codicote ward
Party	Candidate	Votes	%	±%
Conservative	Edward Ian Smith*	763	57.3	−18.6
Labour	Peter Charles Read	569	42.7	+18.6
Turnout			56.0	
Registered electors		2,381		
Conservative hold		Swing	-18.6	

Hitchin Bearton ward
Party	Candidate	Votes	%	±%
Labour	Jennifer Alice Marr*	1,375	63.8	+9.8
Conservative	Nicholas Francis Porter	545	25.3	−3.4
Liberal Democrats	Richard Oliver Canning	235	10.9	+3.0
Turnout			48.2	
Registered electors		4,475		
Labour hold		Swing	+6.6	

Hitchin Highbury ward
Party	Candidate	Votes	%	±%
Conservative	Stephen Peter Boddey	964	37.3	−8.9
SDP	Evelyn Mary Burton* (Mary Burton)	747	28.9	+9.0
Labour	David John Tizzard	670	25.9	+10.7
Independent	Norman Vincent Hyde	204	7.9	+7.9
Turnout			50.8	
Registered electors		5,086		
Conservative gain from SDP		Swing	-9.0	

Hitchin Oughton ward
Party	Candidate	Votes	%	±%
Labour	Harold Alexander Smith* (Harry Smith)	1,368	68.4	−2.2
Conservative	Penelope Mary Lambourne	367	18.3	+18.3
Liberal Democrats	Paul Clark	266	13.3	−16.2
Turnout			47.9	
Registered electors		4,175		
Labour hold		Swing	-10.3	

Hitchin Priory ward
Party	Candidate	Votes	%	±%
Conservative	Robert Stanley Flatman* (Bob Flatman)	822	53.9	−12.0
Liberal Democrats	Stephen Kenneth Harbron	455	29.8	+8.9
Labour	Janet Lynne Gosling	249	16.3	+3.1
Turnout			55.7	
Registered electors		2,741		
Conservative hold		Swing	-10.5	

Hitchin Walsworth ward
Party	Candidate	Votes	%	±%
Ratepayers	Jack Swain*	1,423	47.5	−14.5
Labour	Martin John Stears	1,289	43.0	+16.1
Liberal Democrats	Jennifer Elizabeth Sefton	284	9.5	+1.1
Turnout			49.9	
Registered electors		6,004		
Ratepayers hold		Swing	-15.3	

Kimpton ward
Party	Candidate	Votes	%	±%
Conservative	Alison Kathryn Martin	509	59.8	+59.8
Labour	John Saunders	342	40.2	+21.0
Turnout			52.0	
Registered electors		1,636		
Conservative gain from SDP		Swing	+19.4	

Knebworth ward
Party	Candidate	Votes	%	±%
Conservative	Gordon Cartwright Dumelow*	1,013	56.3	−6.1
Labour	Caroline Rebecca Doyle	415	23.1	+4.9
Liberal Democrats	Michael John Stiff	202	11.2	−8.2
Green	Stuart Wanstall Madgin	170	9.4	+9.4
Turnout			52.6	
Registered electors		3,419		
Conservative hold		Swing	-5.5	

Letchworth East ward
Party	Candidate	Votes	%	±%
Labour	Arthur Jarman	1,435	57.7	+4.5
Conservative	Gloria June Storer	595	23.9	−6.1
Liberal Democrats	Martin Gammell	247	9.9	−6.9
Green	Eric Morris Blakeley	209	8.4	+8.4
Turnout			54.0	
Registered electors		4,600		
Labour hold		Swing	+5.3	

Letchworth Grange ward
Party	Candidate	Votes	%	±%
Labour	Donald Kitchiner*	1,826	65.2	+22.6
Conservative	Michael Douglas Muir	604	21.6	−6.6
Liberal Democrats	Ronald Victor Alan Streeter	245	8.7	−15.1
Green	Ian Thomassen Barrett	126	4.5	+4.5
Turnout			55.1	
Registered electors		5,083		
Labour hold		Swing	+14.6	

Letchworth South East ward
Party	Candidate	Votes	%	±%
Labour	John James Wilkinson (Jack Wilkinson)	1,591	47.8	+20.4
Conservative	Gordon Raymond Whalley	1,097	33.0	−6.1
SDP	Graham Leigh Wellfare	347	10.4	−13.4
Green	Sylvia Stevens	294	8.8	+8.8
Turnout			54.7	
Registered electors		6,091		
Labour gain from SDP		Swing	+13.3	

Letchworth South East had previously been held by SDP councillor Geoff Williams, although the seat had been vacant since his resignation in November 1989.

Letchworth South West ward
Party	Candidate	Votes	%	±%
Conservative	Lynda Ann Needham	1,341	48.3	0.0
Liberal Democrats	Ian Simpson	800	28.8	+0.8
Labour	Nigel Edward Agar	637	22.9	+6.2
Turnout			60.5	
Registered electors		4,592		
Conservative hold		Swing	-0.4	

Letchworth Wilbury ward
Party	Candidate	Votes	%	±%
Labour	Ian Mantle*	1,320	59.4	+13.4
Conservative	Hilary Elizabeth Wilkins	668	30.1	−12.8
Liberal Democrats	Sara Louise Tustin	233	10.5	−0.5
Turnout			55.6	
Registered electors		3,996		
Labour hold		Swing	+13.1	

Royston East ward
Party	Candidate	Votes	%	±%
Conservative	Douglas Drake	1,087	48.2	−10.0
Labour	Jessie Etheridge	686	30.4	+13.8
Liberal Democrats	Gillian Waterhouse	296	13.1	−11.9
SDP	Michael Harrison	184	8.2	+8.2
Turnout			54.0	
Registered electors		4,170		
Conservative hold		Swing	-11.9	

Royston West ward
Party	Candidate	Votes	%	±%
Conservative	Timothy Doyle* (Tim Doyle)	1,261	37.7	−9.1
Liberal Democrats	Stuart Cook	1,043	31.2	−1.7
Labour	Leslie Baker	1,037	31.0	+10.8
Turnout			54.6	
Registered electors		6,125		
Conservative hold		Swing	-3.7	
