= 1998 North Hertfordshire District Council election =

Council election in England

← 1996	7 May 1998	1999 →

18 of 50 seats on North Hertfordshire District Council 26 seats needed for a majority
	First party	Second party
	Lab	Con
Leader	David Kearns	F. John Smith
Party	Labour	Conservative
Seats before	26	16
Seats after	26	17
Seat change	Steady	▲1
	Third party	Fourth party
	LD	Ind
Leader	Ian Simpson
Party	Liberal Democrats	Independent
Seats before	7	1
Seats after	6	1
Seat change	▼1	Steady
Leader before election
David Kearns
Labour
Leader after election
David Kearns
Labour

The 1998 North Hertfordshire District Council election was held on 7 May 1998, at the same time as other local elections across England. There were 18 out of 50 seats on North Hertfordshire District Council up for election, being the usual third of the council plus two by-elections in Hitchin Walsworth and Knebworth wards.

Labour retained its narrow majority on the council. The Conservatives won most votes and gained one extra seat.

== Overall results ==
The overall results were as follows:

1998 North Hertfordshire District Council election
Party	This election			Full council			This election		
Party	Seats	Net	Seats %	Other	Total	Total %	Votes	Votes %	+/−
Conservative	9	▲1	50.0	8	17	50.0	10,154	41.0	+7.8
Labour	8	Steady	44.4	18	26	52.0	9,141	36.9	-8.0
Liberal Democrats	1	▼1	5.6	5	6	12.0	5,088	20.6	-1.3
Green	0	Steady	0.0	0	0	0.0	273	1.1	+1.1
Natural Law	0	Steady	0.0	0	0	0.0	91	0.4	+0.4

== Ward results ==
The results for each ward were as follows. An asterisk(*) indicates a sitting councillor standing for re-election.

Baldock ward
Party	Candidate	Votes	%	±%
Conservative	Bernard Crow	947	48.6	+15.2
Labour	Neil Haslam	763	39.1	−4.4
Liberal Democrats	John White	240	12.3	−10.9
Turnout			26.3	
Registered electors		7,440		
Conservative hold		Swing	+9.8	

Codicote ward
Party	Candidate	Votes	%	±%
Conservative	Luke La Plain	641	62.0	+16.3
Labour	Diane Hillyer	312	30.2	−5.9
Liberal Democrats	Richard Stanley	81	7.8	−6.1
Turnout			40.8	
Registered electors		2,541		
Conservative hold		Swing	+11.1	

Hitchin Bearton ward
Party	Candidate	Votes	%	±%
Labour	Jennifer Marr* (Jenny Marr)	709	57.6	−12.2
Conservative	Patricia Cherry	356	28.9	+10.4
Liberal Democrats	Dorothy Llewelyn	145	11.8	+0.1
Natural Law	George Woodhouse	20	1.6	+1.6
Turnout			26.7	
Registered electors		4,619		
Labour hold		Swing	-11.3	

Hitchin Highbury ward
Party	Candidate	Votes	%	±%
Conservative	Alvaro Damiani (Al Damiani)	1,012	48.5	+9.7
Liberal Democrats	Robert Lord	726	34.8	−6.5
Labour	Jonathan Newham	343	16.4	−3.5
Natural Law	Graham Bell	7	0.3	+0.3
Turnout			41.4	
Registered electors		5,054		
Conservative hold		Swing	+8.1	

Hitchin Oughton ward
Party	Candidate	Votes	%	±%
Labour	Martin Stears*	684	66.2	−1.3
Conservative	Nigel Brook	228	22.1	+6.8
Liberal Democrats	Victoria Warwick (Vicki Warwick)	110	10.6	−6.6
Natural Law	Yvonne Bell	11	1.1	+1.1
Turnout			24.9	
Registered electors		4,159		
Labour hold		Swing	-4.1	

Hitchin Priory ward
Party	Candidate	Votes	%	±%
Conservative	Derrick Ashley*	645	65.0	+9.8
Labour	Derek Sheard	214	21.6	+1.1
Liberal Democrats	John Winder	128	12.9	−11.5
Natural Law	Ann Burcombe	6	0.6	+0.6
Turnout			34.0	
Registered electors		2,926		
Conservative hold		Swing	+6.3	

Hitchin Walsworth ward
Party	Candidate	Votes	%	±%
Labour	Philip Kirk*	1,112	49.7	−17.9
Labour	Sandra Lunn	1,020		
Conservative	Bernard Lovewell	524	23.4	+3.0
Liberal Democrats	David Shirley	357	16.0	+4.0
Green	George Howe	202	9.0	+9.0
Natural Law	Russell Howard	42	1.9	+1.9
Natural Law	Lesley Relph	18		
Turnout			29.7	
Registered electors		6,321		
Labour hold		Swing	-10.5	
Labour hold		Swing		

The by-election in Hitchin Walsworth ward was to replace Labour councillor John Banks.

Kimpton ward
Party	Candidate	Votes	%	±%
Conservative	David Horrell	422	66.4	+18.1
Labour	Colin Seddon	143	22.5	+7.3
Liberal Democrats	Sally Jarvis (Sal Jarvis)	66	10.4	−26.2
Natural Law	Donna Hawkins	5	0.8	+0.8
Turnout			36.5	
Registered electors		1,738		
Conservative hold		Swing	+5.4	

Knebworth ward
Party	Candidate	Votes	%	±%
Conservative	Jane Gray	720	56.3	+6.2
Conservative	Ferrers Robin Bruce Wordsworth (Robin Wordsworth)	715		
Labour	Timothy Liddy	361	28.2	−21.7
Labour	Christopher Tasker	335		
Liberal Democrats	Michael Stiff	128	10.0	+10.0
Green	Stuart Madgin	71	5.5	+5.5
Liberal Democrats	John Winder	47		
Turnout			35.6	
Registered electors		3,459		
Conservative hold		Swing	+14.0	
Conservative hold		Swing		

The by-election in Knebworth ward was to replace Conservative councillor Margaret Hilton.

Letchworth East ward
Party	Candidate	Votes	%	±%
Labour	Arthur Jarman*	750	54.5	−9.6
Conservative	Adam Wilson	370	26.9	+6.4
Liberal Democrats	Martin Gammell	257	18.7	+3.2
Turnout			28.2	
Registered electors		4,903		
Labour hold		Swing	-8.0	

Letchworth Grange ward
Party	Candidate	Votes	%	±%
Labour	Peter Mardell*	996	64.9	−2.3
Conservative	Stephen Paul	304	19.8	−0.5
Liberal Democrats	Robin Hall	235	15.3	+2.8
Turnout			30.4	
Registered electors		5,057		
Labour hold		Swing	-0.9	

Letchworth South East ward
Party	Candidate	Votes	%	±%
Labour	John James Wilkinson* (Jack Wilkinson)	993	43.3	−2.9
Conservative	Carole McNelliey	771	33.7	+3.1
Liberal Democrats	Murray Turner	527	23.0	−0.1
Turnout			36.8	
Registered electors		6,236		
Labour hold		Swing	-3.0	

Letchworth South West ward
Party	Candidate	Votes	%	±%
Liberal Democrats	Alison Kingman	1,097	48.0	+5.6
Conservative	Ray Shakespeare-Smith	936	40.9	−1.6
Labour	Marion Watson-Blake	254	11.1	−4.0
Turnout			49.5	
Registered electors		4,629		
Liberal Democrats hold		Swing	+3.6	

Letchworth Wilbury ward
Party	Candidate	Votes	%	±%
Labour	Ian Mantle*	641	50.8	−8.0
Conservative	Neil Redfern	452	35.8	+9.1
Liberal Democrats	Paul Booton	170	13.5	−1.2
Turnout			27.7	
Registered electors		4,563		
Labour hold		Swing	-8.6	

Royston East ward
Party	Candidate	Votes	%	±%
Conservative	Peter Burt	822	56.8	+8.6
Labour	Robin King	399	27.6	−5.5
Liberal Democrats	John Ledden	227	15.7	−3.2
Turnout			33.2	
Registered electors		4,386		
Conservative hold		Swing	+7.1	

Royston West ward
Party	Candidate	Votes	%	±%
Conservative	John Lombari	1,004	48.6	+14.3
Liberal Democrats	Patricia Baxter* (Pat Baxter) (Note: Previously elected in 1994 as Pat Kennington.)	594	28.8	+2.8
Labour	Vaughan West	467	22.6	−17.0
Turnout			32.1	
Registered electors		6,513		
Conservative gain from Liberal Democrats		Swing	+5.8	
