= 1982 North Hertfordshire District Council election =

Council election in England

| ← 1980 | 6 May 1982 | 1983 → |

16 of 50 seats on North Hertfordshire District Council 26 seats needed for a majority
| | First party | Second party |
|---|---|---|
| | Con | Lab |
| Leader | Bob Flatman | Jim Reilly |
| Party | Conservative | Labour |
| Seats before | 31 | 15 |
| Seats after | 32 | 14 |
| Seat change | ▲1 | ▼1 |
| | Third party | Fourth party |
| | Ind | RA |
| Party | Independent | Ratepayers |
| Seats before | 2 | 2 |
| Seats after | 2 | 2 |
| Seat change | Steady | Steady |
Leader before election
Bob Flatman
Conservative
Leader after election
Bob Flatman
Conservative

The 1982 North Hertfordshire District Council election was held on 6 May 1982, at the same time as other local elections across England and Scotland. There were 16 out of 50 seats on North Hertfordshire District Council up for election, being the usual third of the council.

Only one seat changed party, being a Conservative win from Labour in Letchworth South East ward. The council remained under Conservative control. The new SDP–Liberal Alliance took over 26% of the vote but did not secure any seats. The Labour vote fell by over 20% compared to the 1980 election.

== Overall results ==
The overall results were as follows:

1982 North Hertfordshire District Council election
| Party | This election | | | Full council | | | This election | | |
| Party | Seats | Net | Seats % | Other | Total | Total % | Votes | Votes % | +/− |
|---|---|---|---|---|---|---|---|---|---|
| Conservative | 11 | ▲1 | 68.8 | 21 | 32 | 64.0 | 13,436 | 41.3 | -0.9 |
| Labour | 3 | ▼1 | 18.8 | 11 | 14 | 28.0 | 8,892 | 27.3 | -20.4 |
| Alliance | 0 | Steady | 0.0 | 0 | 0 | 0.0 | 8,477 | 26.1 | +22.3 |
| Ratepayers | 1 | Steady | 6.3 | 1 | 2 | 4.0 | 1,159 | 3.6 | +0.9 |
| Independent | 1 | Steady | 6.3 | 1 | 2 | 4.0 | 518 | 1.6 | +0.1 |
| Ecology | 0 | Steady | 0.0 | 0 | 0 | 0.0 | 58 | 0.2 | -1.9 |

== Ward results ==
The results for each ward were as follows. An asterisk(*) indicates a sitting councillor standing for re-election.

Baldock ward
| Party | Candidate | Votes | % | ±% |
|---|---|---|---|---|
| Conservative | Peter Clarke | 986 | 40.5 | +5.9 |
| Labour | Roger McFall | 766 | 31.5 | −25.1 |
| Alliance | Michael Pritchett | 625 | 25.7 | +25.7 |
| Ecology | Stephen Toogood | 58 | 2.4 | −6.5 |
| Turnout | | | 46.8 | |
| Registered electors | | 5,203 | | |
| Conservative hold | | Swing | +15.5 | |

Codicote ward
| Party | Candidate | Votes | % | ±% |
|---|---|---|---|---|
| Conservative | Denis Winch* | 744 | 76.2 | +3.3 |
| Labour | Andrew Wright (Andy Wright) | 233 | 23.8 | −3.3 |
| Turnout | | | 43.1 | |
| Registered electors | | 2,267 | | |
| Conservative hold | | Swing | +3.3 | |

Hitchin Bearton ward
| Party | Candidate | Votes | % | ±% |
|---|---|---|---|---|
| Conservative | Norman Frost | 877 | 39.9 | −7.2 |
| Labour | Harold Smith (Harry Smith) | 796 | 36.2 | −16.7 |
| Alliance | Harry Shipley | 524 | 23.9 | +23.9 |
| Turnout | | | 49.7 | |
| Registered electors | | 4,421 | | |
| Conservative hold | | Swing | +4.8 | |

Hitchin Highbury ward
| Party | Candidate | Votes | % | ±% |
|---|---|---|---|---|
| Conservative | Archie Kingston-Splatt (Bill Kingston-Splatt) | 1,298 | 54.9 | −11.8 |
| Alliance | Brian Abrahams | 785 | 33.2 | +33.2 |
| Labour | Keith Ruff | 283 | 12.0 | −11.6 |
| Turnout | | | 46.7 | |
| Registered electors | | 5,066 | | |
| Conservative hold | | Swing | -22.5 | |

Hitchin Oughton ward
| Party | Candidate | Votes | % | ±% |
|---|---|---|---|---|
| Labour | Jim Reilly* | 919 | 48.1 | −21.4 |
| Conservative | Derrick Ashley | 595 | 31.2 | +3.8 |
| Alliance | Sarah Hall | 396 | 20.7 | +20.7 |
| Turnout | | | 42.1 | |
| Registered electors | | 4,537 | | |
| Labour hold | | Swing | -12.6 | |

Hitchin Priory ward
| Party | Candidate | Votes | % | ±% |
|---|---|---|---|---|
| Conservative | Bob Flatman* | 936 | 65.0 | −18.6 |
| Alliance | Wilfred Aspinall | 406 | 28.2 | +28.2 |
| Labour | Liz Billing | 98 | 6.8 | −9.6 |
| Turnout | | | 51.4 | |
| Registered electors | | 2,802 | | |
| Conservative hold | | Swing | -23.4 | |

Hitchin Walsworth ward
| Party | Candidate | Votes | % | ±% |
|---|---|---|---|---|
| Ratepayers | Brian Worbey* | 1,130 | 44.9 | +11.3 |
| Labour | Barry Sharp | 756 | 30.1 | −22.0 |
| Alliance | Robert Lord (Bob Lord) | 629 | 25.0 | +14.1 |
| Turnout | | | 43.9 | |
| Registered electors | | 5,729 | | |
| Ratepayers hold | | Swing | +16.7 | |

Kimpton ward
| Party | Candidate | Votes | % | ±% |
|---|---|---|---|---|
| Independent | Francis Thompson | 518 | 81.3 | +27.3 |
| Labour | Owen Swain | 119 | 18.7 | +11.7 |
| Turnout | | | 38.5 | |
| Registered electors | | 1,655 | | |
| Independent hold | | Swing | +7.8 | |

Knebworth ward
| Party | Candidate | Votes | % | ±% |
|---|---|---|---|---|
| Conservative | Gordon Dumelow* | 927 | 58.0 | −0.5 |
| Alliance | Derek Scott | 324 | 20.3 | +20.3 |
| Labour | Kay Kelly | 318 | 19.9 | −21.6 |
| Ratepayers | Dennis Bols | 29 | 1.8 | +1.8 |
| Turnout | | | 50.6 | |
| Registered electors | | 3,158 | | |
| Conservative hold | | Swing | -10.4 | |

Letchworth East ward
| Party | Candidate | Votes | % | ±% |
|---|---|---|---|---|
| Labour | Stan Wilmer* | 901 | 40.4 | −21.5 |
| Alliance | William Armitage | 713 | 32.0 | +32.0 |
| Conservative | David Langridge | 617 | 27.7 | −10.5 |
| Turnout | | | 53.6 | |
| Registered electors | | 4,162 | | |
| Labour hold | | Swing | -26.8 | |

Letchworth Grange ward
| Party | Candidate | Votes | % | ±% |
|---|---|---|---|---|
| Labour | Don Kitchiner* | 912 | 38.4 | −25.9 |
| Alliance | James Bray | 822 | 34.7 | +34.7 |
| Conservative | Jean Sherwood | 638 | 26.9 | −8.7 |
| Turnout | | | 45.8 | |
| Registered electors | | 5,179 | | |
| Labour hold | | Swing | -30.3 | |

Letchworth South East ward
| Party | Candidate | Votes | % | ±% |
|---|---|---|---|---|
| Conservative | Norman Prior | 1,121 | 35.9 | +5.9 |
| Alliance | Tony Quinn | 1,028 | 32.9 | +5.0 |
| Labour | Joan Kirby* | 974 | 31.2 | −10.9 |
| Turnout | | | 52.6 | |
| Registered electors | | 5,949 | | |
| Conservative gain from Labour | | Swing | +0.5 | |

Letchworth South West ward
| Party | Candidate | Votes | % | ±% |
|---|---|---|---|---|
| Conservative | Anthony Burrows* | 1,566 | 63.6 | +19.6 |
| Liberal | Patrick Short | 581 | 23.6 | −5.3 |
| Labour | Ahmad Khawaja | 316 | 12.8 | −14.3 |
| Turnout | | | 57.0 | |
| Registered electors | | 4,321 | | |
| Conservative hold | | Swing | +12.5 | |

Letchworth Wilbury ward
| Party | Candidate | Votes | % | ±% |
|---|---|---|---|---|
| Conservative | Keith Emsall* | 947 | 40.9 | +4.5 |
| Labour | Stuart Murray | 905 | 39.1 | −15.6 |
| Alliance | William Gore | 462 | 20.0 | +11.1 |
| Turnout | | | 57.4 | |
| Registered electors | | 4,031 | | |
| Conservative hold | | Swing | +10.1 | |

Royston East ward
| Party | Candidate | Votes | % | ±% |
|---|---|---|---|---|
| Conservative | Pat Rule* | 1,027 | 55.1 | −6.3 |
| Liberal | Hazel Lord | 634 | 34.0 | +16.7 |
| Labour | Jessie Etheridge | 204 | 10.9 | −10.5 |
| Turnout | | | 48.8 | |
| Registered electors | | 3,822 | | |
| Conservative hold | | Swing | -11.5 | |

Royston West ward
| Party | Candidate | Votes | % | ±% |
|---|---|---|---|---|
| Conservative | Harold Greenfield* | 1,157 | 55.2 | +12.5 |
| SDP | Martin Castle | 548 | 26.1 | +1.4 |
| Labour | Mick Kernaghan | 392 | 18.7 | −13.9 |
| Turnout | | | 44.1 | |
| Registered electors | | 4,755 | | |
| Conservative hold | | Swing | +5.6 | |
