= 1986 North Hertfordshire District Council election =

Council election in England

← 1984	8 May 1986	1987 →

16 of 50 seats on North Hertfordshire District Council 26 seats needed for a majority
	First party	Second party	Third party
	Con	Lab	All
Leader	Bob Flatman	Audrey Carss	Tony Quinn
Party	Conservative	Labour	Alliance
Seats before	31	12	3
Seats after	26	14	7
Seat change	▼5	▲2	▲4
	Fourth party	Fifth party
	RA	Ind
Party	Ratepayers	Independent
Seats before	3	1
Seats after	3	0
Seat change	Steady	▼1
Leader before election
Bob Flatman
Conservative
Leader after election
Bob Flatman
Conservative

The 1986 North Hertfordshire District Council election was held on 8 May 1986, at the same time as other local elections across England and Scotland. There were 16 out of 50 seats on North Hertfordshire District Council up for election, being the usual third of the council.

The Conservatives lost five seats and only narrowly retained their majority on the council. The SDP–Liberal Alliance took the most votes across the district, gaining four extra seats.

== Overall results ==
The overall results were as follows:

1986 North Hertfordshire District Council election
Party	This election			Full council			This election		
Party	Seats	Net	Seats %	Other	Total	Total %	Votes	Votes %	+/−
Alliance	4	▲4	25.0	3	7	14.0	12,343	33.7	+9.6
Conservative	6	▼5	37.5	20	26	52.0	11,852	32.3	-6.7
Labour	5	▲2	31.3	9	14	28.0	10,680	29.1	-3.2
Ratepayers	1	Steady	6.3	2	3	6.0	1,273	3.5	+0.4
Independent	0	▼1	0.0	0	0	0.0	339	0.9	-0.6
Green	0	Steady	0.0	0	0	0.0	152	0.4	+0.4

== Ward results ==
The results for each ward were as follows. An asterisk (*) indicates a sitting councillor standing for re-election.

Baldock ward
Party	Candidate	Votes	%	±%
Conservative	Peter Clarke*	1,146	36.5	−18.9
Labour	Roger McFall	1,069	34.0	+6.8
Alliance	Bob Young	929	29.5	+12.1
Turnout			53.8	
Registered electors		5,839		
Conservative hold		Swing	-12.9	

Codicote ward
Party	Candidate	Votes	%	±%
Conservative	Denis Winch*	563	43.5	−32.6
Alliance	Christine Stevenson	418	32.3	+32.3
Labour	Karry Omer	313	24.2	+0.3
Turnout			55.7	
Registered electors		2,324		
Conservative hold		Swing	-32.5	

Hitchin Bearton ward
Party	Candidate	Votes	%	±%
Labour	Jenny Marr	1,132	50.6	+3.6
Conservative	Norman Frost*	720	32.2	−7.5
Alliance	Penny Cunningham	385	17.2	+3.9
Turnout			50.3	
Registered electors		4,450		
Labour gain from Conservative		Swing	+5.6	

Hitchin Highbury ward
Party	Candidate	Votes	%	±%
Alliance	Mary Burton	1,204	46.2	+14.1
Conservative	Bill Kingston-Splatt*	1,025	39.4	−12.5
Labour	David Tizzard	375	14.4	−1.6
Turnout			51.0	
Registered electors		5,105		
Alliance gain from Conservative		Swing	+13.3	

Hitchin Oughton ward
Party	Candidate	Votes	%	±%
Labour	Harry Smith	1,020	52.7	−7.6
Alliance	Jenny Sefton	578	29.9	+15.6
Conservative	Valerie Leeson	336	17.4	−7.9
Turnout			44.2	
Registered electors		4,377		
Labour hold		Swing	-11.6	

Hitchin Priory ward
Party	Candidate	Votes	%	±%
Conservative	Bob Flatman*	718	57.1	−10.6
Alliance	John Seabrook	349	27.7	+6.1
Labour	Jane Newbury	191	15.2	+4.5
Turnout			45.4	
Registered electors		2,769		
Conservative hold		Swing	-8.4	

Hitchin Walsworth ward
Party	Candidate	Votes	%	±%
Ratepayers	Jack Swain	1,273	45.5	+9.3
Labour	Veronica Sharp	1,008	36.0	+5.0
Alliance	Alison Kelt	429	15.3	+2.2
Green	Ann Roberts	87	3.1	+3.1
Turnout			47.1	
Registered electors		5,941		
Residents hold		Swing	+2.2	

Kimpton ward
Party	Candidate	Votes	%	±%
Alliance	Adam Wilkins	363	41.8	+41.8
Independent	David Wright	339	39.0	−42.3
Labour	Stephen MacDonald	167	19.2	+0.5
Turnout			52.8	
Registered electors		1,645		
Alliance gain from Independent		Swing	+42.1	

Knebworth ward
Party	Candidate	Votes	%	±%
Conservative	Gordon Dumelow*	940	57.6	+5.5
Alliance	Michael Stiff	422	25.9	−3.2
Labour	Carole Carter	270	16.5	−2.3
Turnout			49.4	
Registered electors		3,302		
Conservative hold		Swing	+4.4	

Letchworth East ward
Party	Candidate	Votes	%	±%
Labour	Ram Summan	916	39.5	−3.8
Alliance	Tony Elliott	894	38.5	+3.4
Conservative	John Bush	511	22.0	+0.4
Turnout			39.7	
Registered electors		5,841		
Labour hold		Swing	-3.6	

Letchworth Grange ward
Party	Candidate	Votes	%	±%
Labour	Don Kitchiner*	1,233	42.2	+1.1
Alliance	Peter Welch	1,107	37.9	+3.6
Conservative	Jim Hannah	519	17.7	−6.9
Green	Ian Barrett	65	2.2	+2.2
Turnout			56.5	
Registered electors		5,179		
Labour hold		Swing	-1.3	

Letchworth South East ward
Party	Candidate	Votes	%	±%
Alliance	Geoff Williams	1,754	49.8	+16.2
Conservative	Norman Prior*	931	26.4	−7.8
Labour	Nigel Agar	840	23.8	−8.4
Turnout			59.2	
Registered electors		5,954		
Alliance gain from Conservative		Swing	+12.0	

Letchworth South West ward
Party	Candidate	Votes	%	±%
Conservative	Anthony Burrows*	1,402	49.7	−4.5
Alliance	Martin Fisher	1,152	40.9	+20.1
Labour	Michael Jovic	265	9.4	−15.6
Turnout			62.8	
Registered electors		4,491		
Conservative hold		Swing	-12.3	

Letchworth Wilbury ward
Party	Candidate	Votes	%	±%
Labour	Ian Mantle	1,048	43.3	+1.2
Conservative	Keith Emsall*	842	34.8	−9.6
Alliance	Hermione Edwards	532	22.0	+8.4
Turnout			60.3	
Registered electors		4,016		
Labour gain from Conservative		Swing	+5.4	

Royston East ward
Party	Candidate	Votes	%	±%
Conservative	Pat Rule*	1,114	52.2	−20.2
Alliance	Jenny McCann	733	34.3	+34.3
Labour	Jeffrey Gill	288	13.5	−14.1
Turnout			53.4	
Registered electors		3,996		
Conservative hold		Swing	-27.3	

Royston West ward
Party	Candidate	Votes	%	±%
Alliance	Frances Bate	1,094	40.2	−6.2
Conservative	Terry Botfield	1,085	39.8	+2.1
Labour	Eunice King	545	20.0	+4.1
Turnout			51.2	
Registered electors		5,319		
Alliance gain from Conservative		Swing	-4.2	
