= 1973 North Hertfordshire District Council election =

Council election in England

7 June 1973	1976 →

All 48 seats on North Hertfordshire District Council 25 seats needed for a majority
	First party	Second party
	Con	Lab
Leader	Bob Flatman	John Goldsmith
Party	Conservative	Labour
Seats after	23	17
	Third party	Fourth party
	Ind	RA
Party	Independent	Ratepayers
Seats after	7	1
Leader after election
Bob Flatman
Conservative
No overall control

The 1973 North Hertfordshire District Council election was held on 7 June 1973. It was the first election to North Hertfordshire District Council, and was held at the same time as other local elections across England for the new non-metropolitan district councils that were created under the Local Government Act 1972. The elected councillors initially formed a shadow authority to oversee the transition to the new system, operating alongside the five outgoing district councils until 1 April 1974 when the new district formally came into being.

The election saw the Conservatives form the largest party on the council, albeit falling a couple of seats short of having a majority, leaving the council under no overall control. The Conservatives formed a minority administration, with their group leader, Bob Flatman, becoming the first leader of the council.

== Overall results ==
The overall results were as follows:

North Hertfordshire District Council Election, 1973
Party	Seats	Gains	Losses	Net gain/loss	Seats %	Votes %	Votes	+/−
Conservative	23				47.9	42.7	14,958	
Labour	17				35.4	32.8	11,492	
Independent	7				14.6	19.6	6,862	
Ratepayers	1				2.1	3.1	1,099	
Liberal	0				0.0	1.8	616	

== Ward results ==
The new district was divided into 18 numbered wards, electing between one and four councillors each to give a total of 48 councillors:

- Ward 1 was the Baldock Urban District.
- Wards 2–6 were the wards of Hitchin Urban District.
- Wards 7–11 were the wards of Letchworth Urban District.
- Ward 12 was the Royston Urban District.
- Wards 13–18 were all groups of civil parishes from Hitchin Rural District.

The results for each ward were as follows:

Ward 1: Baldock
Party	Candidate	Votes	%	±%
Independent	Nora M. Burgess	1,212	40.4	
Labour	George A. York	813	27.1	
Conservative	John Barton	769	25.6	
Labour	Stanley Watson	687		
Labour	Roger McFall	639		
Conservative	Richard E. Harrison	605		
Liberal	John C. Whelan	207	6.9	
Turnout			62.7	
Registered electors		4,785		
Independent win (new seat)				
Labour win (new seat)				
Conservative win (new seat)				

Ward 2: Hitchin Oughton
Party	Candidate	Votes	%	±%
Labour	Audrey Carss	683	52.8	
Labour	James Reilly (Jim Reilly)	666		
Labour	Charles Rowe (Jim Rowe)	624		
Conservative	John Parfitt	338	26.1	
Independent	Tony Elliott	272	21.0	
Turnout			27.1	
Registered electors		4,094		
Labour win (new seat)				
Labour win (new seat)				
Labour win (new seat)				

Ward 3: Hitchin Bearton
Party	Candidate	Votes	%	±%
Conservative	John Ballantyne	949	57.0	
Conservative	Dorothy Jenkinson	917		
Labour	Andrew McQuillan	716	43.0	
Labour	John Seabrook	705		
Turnout			46.2	
Registered electors		3,682		
Conservative win (new seat)				
Conservative win (new seat)				

Ward 4: Hitchin Priory
Party	Candidate	Votes	%	±%
Conservative	Robert Stanley Flatman (Bob Flatman)	1,013	59.6	
Conservative	Keith Crook	989		
Conservative	Derek Doel	960		
Liberal	Bill Williams	409	24.0	
Labour	Derek Massey	279	16.4	
Labour	Jean Gentle	267		
Labour	Athelstan Herbert	253		
Turnout			33.7	
Registered electors		4,469		
Conservative win (new seat)				
Conservative win (new seat)				
Conservative win (new seat)				

Ward 5: Hitchin Walsworth
Party	Candidate	Votes	%	±%
Labour	John Goldsmith	880	36.7	
Labour	Peter Clarke	833		
Ratepayers	Ken Logan	769	32.1	
Conservative	David Ingram	750	31.3	
Ratepayers	Ted Morton	720		
Labour	Crystal Toleman	708		
Turnout			46.3	
Registered electors		4,023		
Labour win (new seat)				
Labour win (new seat)				
Ratepayers win (new seat)				

Ward 6: Hitchin Highbury
Party	Candidate	Votes	%	±%
Conservative	Beryl Wearmouth	1,152	53.3	
Conservative	Les Ford	988		
Conservative	Michael Hillman	891		
Independent	Don Bache	748	34.6	
Independent	Ron Hartless	447		
Independent	George Jackson	387		
Labour	Walter Patrick Guymer	261	12.1	
Labour	David Wilson	230		
Labour	Doris Reilly	223		
Independent	Peter Hull	159		
Turnout			45.7	
Registered electors		4,211		
Conservative win (new seat)				
Conservative win (new seat)				
Conservative win (new seat)				

Ward 7: Letchworth Norton
Party	Candidate	Votes	%	±%
Labour	William Miller (Bill Miller)	1,513	62.9	
Labour	Christopher Derek Stockwell (Chris Stockwell)	1,396		
Labour	Gerard Devlin (Gerry Devlin)	1,384		
Labour	Edith Badstevener	1,309		
Conservative	James McGinlay	894	37.1	
Conservative	Brian J. Down	866		
Turnout			37.0	
Registered electors		6,285		
Labour win (new seat)				
Labour win (new seat)				
Labour win (new seat)				
Labour win (new seat)				

Ward 8: Letchworth Pixmore
Party	Candidate	Votes	%	±%
Labour	David A. Griffiths	1,178	75.3	
Labour	Reginald S. Hall (Reg Hall)	1,163		
Labour	Ernest M. Brown (Ernie Brown)	1,149		
Conservative	William Charles Bifield (Charles Bifield)	387	24.7	
Turnout			32.9	
Registered electors		5,057		
Labour win (new seat)				
Labour win (new seat)				
Labour win (new seat)				

Ward 9: Letchworth Wilbury
Party	Candidate	Votes	%	±%
Labour	David Gallard	1,144	59.5	
Labour	Mary B. Briercliffe (Mamie Briercliffe)	1,107		
Labour	Ian Mantle	1,102		
Conservative	John Cole	779	40.5	
Conservative	Barry C. Jackson	755		
Turnout			47.0	
Registered electors		4,243		
Labour win (new seat)				
Labour win (new seat)				
Labour win (new seat)				

Ward 10: Letchworth Westbury
Party	Candidate	Votes	%	±%
Conservative	Clifford J. Marshall (Cliff Marshall)	832	54.5	
Conservative	John G. McKenna	782		
Labour	Donald Kitchiner (Don Kitchiner)	696	45.5	
Labour	Edna Patricia Watson-Blake (Pat Watson-Blake)	679		
Turnout			62.2	
Registered electors		2,519		
Conservative win (new seat)				
Conservative win (new seat)				

Ward 11: Letchworth Central and Willian
Party	Candidate	Votes	%	±%
Conservative	Robert Saunders (Bob Saunders)	962	59.9	
Conservative	Margaret Gavin Jones	941		
Independent	Douglas C. Squirrell	417	26.0	
Labour	Florence Wiggs	226	14.1	
Labour	Leslie Pulham (Les Pulham)	165		
Turnout			40.7	
Registered electors		3,574		
Conservative win (new seat)				
Conservative win (new seat)				

Ward 12: Royston
Party	Candidate	Votes	%	±%
Independent	George William Stevens	1,559	42.7	
Independent	Patricia Alison Rule	1,544		
Conservative	Francis John Smith (John Smith)	1,336	36.6	
Independent	Philip Leslie Gray	1,298		
Conservative	Christopher McMichael	852		
Labour	Robert Douglas Beckwith	760	20.8	
Labour	Brian William Cavanagh	673		
Labour	Alan Evans	666		
Labour	Anthony Clive Pettit	600		
Turnout			58.2	
Registered electors		6,279		
Independent win (new seat)				
Independent win (new seat)				
Conservative win (new seat)				
Independent win (new seat)				

Ward 13: Ashwell, Bygrave, Caldecote, Clothall, Graveley, Hinxworth, Newnham, Radwell and Weston
Party	Candidate	Votes	%	±%
Independent	Eric James Gurney	971	51.5	
Conservative	Robert Peter Evans	649	34.4	
Conservative	Nellie Laura Thompson	642		
Labour	William Watson	266	14.1	
Labour	Willie Page	243		
Turnout			67.4	
Registered electors		2,800		
Independent win (new seat)				
Conservative win (new seat)				

Ward 14: Barkway, Barley, Kelshall, Nuthampstead, Reed, Rushden, Sandon, Therfield and Wallington
Party	Candidate	Votes	%	±%
Conservative	Esther Mary Brookes	710	55.5	
Conservative	Ian Smith Rose	558		
Independent	John Joseph Crumpholt	414	32.4	
Labour	Pamela Marjorie Toorchen	155	12.1	
Labour	Brian Douglas Miller	118		
Turnout			55.5	
Registered electors		2,304		
Conservative win (new seat)				
Conservative win (new seat)				

Ward 15: Ippollitts, Kimpton, Langley, Preston, St Paul's Walden and Wymondley
Party	Candidate	Votes	%	±%
Conservative	Ivan Wren	1,457	77.5	
Conservative	Margaret Jane McMurtrie (Jane McMurtrie)	1,383		
Conservative	John Raffell	1,312		
Labour	David Kendall	422	22.5	
Labour	Christina Evans	405		
Labour	Philip Leslie Dicks	348		
Turnout			42.6	
Registered electors		4,547		
Conservative win (new seat)				
Conservative win (new seat)				
Conservative win (new seat)				

Ward 16: Codicote
Party	Candidate	Votes	%	±%
Conservative	Denis Winch	614	71.8	
Labour	Anthony Gentle	241	28.2	
Turnout			43.2	
Registered electors		1,986		
Conservative win (new seat)				

Ward 17: Knebworth
Party	Candidate	Votes	%	±%
Conservative	Gordon Dumelow	659	40.1	
Conservative	Alfred Grosse	555		
Labour	Martin Lisles	355	21.6	
Ratepayers	Dennis Bols	330	20.1	
Independent	Ernest Grosse	298	18.1	
Turnout			46.5	
Registered electors		2,675		
Conservative win (new seat)				
Conservative win (new seat)				

Ward 18: Hexton, Holwell, Ickleford, King's Walden, Lilley, Offley and Pirton
Party	Candidate	Votes	%	±%
Independent	Ron Lodge	971	37.6	
Labour	Gilbert Kendall	904	35.0	
Independent	David Stedman	894		
Independent	James Holden	847		
Labour	Ronald Hawkes (Ron Hawkes)	770		
Labour	Raymond Cousins (Ray Cousins)	742		
Conservative	Howard Swann	708	27.4	
Conservative	Arthur Baines	679		
Conservative	Ian Little	638		
Turnout			52.7	
Registered electors		4,736		
Independent win (new seat)				
Labour win (new seat)				
Independent win (new seat)				

== Changes 1973–1976 ==
Ward 7: Letchworth Norton by-election, 25 September 1975
Party	Candidate	Votes	%	±%
Labour	Donald Kitchiner (Don Kitchiner)			
Conservative	Geoffrey Peter Woods (Geoff Woods)			
Turnout			38.4	
Majority		35		
Labour hold		Swing	-10	

The Letchworth Norton by-election was triggered by the resignation of Labour councillor Chris Stockwell on 18 August 1975. The seat was retained for Labour by Don Kitchiner. The precise number of votes cast was not reported, only the majority, turnout and swing.
