= 1979 North Hertfordshire District Council election =

Council election in England

← 1976	3 May 1979	1980 →

All 50 seats on North Hertfordshire District Council 26 seats needed for a majority
	First party	Second party
	Con	Lab
Leader	Bob Flatman	Bill Miller
Party	Conservative	Labour
Seats before	30	11
Seats after	34	12
Seat change	▲4	▲1
	Third party	Fourth party
	Ind	RA
Party	Independent	Ratepayers
Seats before	5	2
Seats after	2	2
Seat change	▼3	Steady
Leader before election
Bob Flatman
Conservative
Leader after election
Bob Flatman
Conservative

The 1979 North Hertfordshire District Council election was held on 3 May 1979, at the same time as other local elections across England and Wales and the 1979 United Kingdom general election. All 50 seats on North Hertfordshire District Council were up for election following ward boundary changes.

The election saw the Conservatives increase their majority on the council.

== Overall results ==
The overall results were as follows:

North Hertfordshire District Council Election, 1979
Party	Seats	Gains	Losses	Net gain/loss	Seats %	Votes %	Votes	+/−
Conservative	34			+4	68.0	52.0	33,135	+2.2
Labour	12			+1	24.0	33.8	21,519	+5.0
Liberal	0				0.0	4.7	2,988	+0.8
Independent	2			-3	4.0	4.6	2,945	-7.7
Ratepayers	2			0	4.0	3.6	2,082	-1.6
Ecology	0				0.0	1.0	627	+1.0
National Front	0				0.0	0.2	140	+0.2

== Ward results ==
The number of seats on the council was increased from 48 to 50 and there were extensive ward boundary changes. The new ward arrangements allowed for the council to subsequently be elected roughly a third at a time rather than all at once. The results for each ward were as follows. An asterisk(*) indicates a sitting councillor standing for re-election.

Arbury ward
Party	Candidate	Votes	%	±%
Conservative	John Sheldrick*	668	46.1	
Liberal	Glenis Travis	585	40.4	
Labour	John Payne	195	13.5	
Turnout			82.6	
Registered electors		1,753		
Conservative win (new seat)				

Ashbrook ward
Party	Candidate	Votes	%	±%
Conservative	Michael Tatham	1,084	63.3	
Labour	Keith Brydon	628	36.7	
Turnout			83.3	
Registered electors		2,054		
Conservative win (new seat)				

Baldock ward
Party	Candidate	Votes	%	±%
Conservative	Alan Evens	1,850	42.9	
Conservative	Lord Stanley Corbett (Note: "Lord" was his first given name rather than a title.)	1,663		
Labour	Willy Page	1,633	37.8	
Labour	Roger McFall	1,608		
Labour	Stan Watson	1,513		
Conservative	Colin Vaughan	1,499		
Independent	Jane Tomkinson	832	19.3	
Turnout			86.8	
Registered electors		4,974		
Conservative hold		Swing		
Conservative hold		Swing		
Labour gain from Independent		Swing		

Cadwell ward
Party	Candidate	Votes	%	±%
Independent	Ron Lodge*	733	52.2	
Conservative	James Halliday	474	33.7	
Labour	Jenny Marr	153	10.9	
Liberal	Sarah Low	45	3.2	
Turnout			83.4	
Registered electors		1,685		
Independent win (new seat)				

Codicote ward
Party	Candidate	Votes	%	±%
Conservative	Denis Winch*	1,249	72.8	
Labour	Owen Swain	466	27.2	
Turnout			80.9	
Registered electors		2,119		
Conservative hold		Swing		

Hitchin Bearton ward
Party	Candidate	Votes	%	±%
Conservative	David Roberts*	1,605	50.8	
Conservative	Fred Scott*	1,537		
Conservative	Tim Phillips	1,507		
Labour	Paul Prescott	1,416	44.8	
Labour	Judi Smith	1,355		
Labour	Brian Abrahams	1,323		
National Front	Paul Cooper	140	4.4	
Turnout			73.9	
Registered electors		4,275		
Conservative hold		Swing		
Conservative hold		Swing		
Conservative win (new seat)				

Hitchin Highbury ward
Party	Candidate	Votes	%	±%
Conservative	Beryl Wearmouth*	2,784	71.8	
Conservative	Stuart Grantham*	2,590		
Conservative	Betty Goble*	2,571		
Labour	Pat Guymer	1,092	28.2	
Labour	Doris Reilly	1,048		
Labour	Keith Ruff	985		
Turnout			77.4	
Registered electors		5,006		
Conservative hold		Swing		
Conservative hold		Swing		
Conservative hold		Swing		

Hitchin Oughton ward
Party	Candidate	Votes	%	±%
Labour	Audrey Carss*	1,750	52.9	
Labour	Jim Reilly*	1,677		
Labour	Martin Stears	1,594		
Conservative	Derrick Ashley	1,275	38.5	
Conservative	Valerie Leeson	1,214		
Conservative	Andrew Smith	1,141		
Independent	Vic Logan	283	8.6	
Turnout			75.4	
Registered electors		4,385		
Labour hold		Swing		
Labour hold		Swing		
Labour hold		Swing		

Hitchin Priory ward
Party	Candidate	Votes	%	±%
Conservative	Bob Flatman*	1,731	79.1	
Conservative	Michael Hillman*	1,606		
Labour	Roger Burford Mason	457	20.9	
Labour	Harchet Bains	341		
Turnout			79.0	
Registered electors		2,768		
Conservative hold		Swing		
Conservative hold		Swing		

Hitchin Walsworth ward
Party	Candidate	Votes	%	±%
Ratepayers	Ken Logan*	2,313	41.5	
Ratepayers	Brian Worbey*	2,119		
Labour	Fred Peacock*	1,703	30.6	
Conservative	Phillip MacCormack	1,551	27.9	
Labour	Moira Anderson	1,144		
Labour	Bill Harmer	1,105		
Turnout			110.9	
Registered electors		5,019		
Ratepayers hold		Swing		
Ratepayers hold		Swing		
Labour hold		Swing		

Hitchwood ward
Party	Candidate	Votes	%	±%
Conservative	John Raffell*	782	76.8	
Labour	Ms E. Connelly	236	23.2	
Turnout			80.7	
Registered electors		1,262		
Conservative win (new seat)				

Hoo ward
Party	Candidate	Votes	%	±%
Conservative	John Jackson*	786	63.4	
Labour	Tony Brown	453	36.6	
Turnout			81.5	
Registered electors		1,520		
Conservative win (new seat)				

Kimpton ward
Party	Candidate	Votes	%	±%
Independent	Paul Nicholson	672	54.1	
Conservative	Francis Thompson	484	38.9	
Labour	Don Smith	87	7.0	
Turnout			82.9	
Registered electors		1,500		
Independent win (new seat)				

Knebworth ward
Party	Candidate	Votes	%	±%
Conservative	Gordon Dumelow*	1,691	59.9	
Conservative	Alfred Grosse*	1,195		
Ecology	Melanie Hutchins	627	22.2	
Labour	Christina Evans	507	17.9	
Labour	Joan Page	476		
Turnout			91.5	
Registered electors		3,088		
Conservative hold		Swing		
Conservative hold		Swing		

Letchworth East ward
Party	Candidate	Votes	%	±%
Labour	Headley Parkins	1,526	45.1	
Labour	Stan Wilmer	1,479		
Labour	Tony McWalter	1,443		
Conservative	Alan Brett	1,436	42.4	
Conservative	Malcolm Bage	1,351		
Conservative	Peter Colvin	1,342		
Independent	Roger Leach	425	12.5	
Turnout			83.3	
Registered electors		4,067		
Labour win (new seat)				
Labour win (new seat)				
Labour win (new seat)				

Letchworth Grange ward
Party	Candidate	Votes	%	±%
Labour	Bill Miller*	2,400	62.4	
Labour	Don Kitchiner*	2,039		
Labour	David Kearns	1,977		
Conservative	Charles Bifield	1,444	37.6	
Conservative	John McKenna	1,429		
Conservative	Annie Murphy	1,327		
Turnout			77.6	
Registered electors		4,956		
Labour win (new seat)				
Labour win (new seat)				
Labour win (new seat)				

Letchworth South East ward
Party	Candidate	Votes	%	±%
Conservative	Paul Shipman*	2,270	54.9	
Conservative	John Yates	2,193		
Conservative	Jenny Ritchie	2,191		
Labour	Noel Geaney	1,863	45.1	
Labour	Joan Kirby	1,655		
Labour	George York	1,576		
Turnout			74.6	
Registered electors		5,537		
Conservative win (new seat)				
Conservative win (new seat)				
Conservative win (new seat)				

Letchworth South West ward
Party	Candidate	Votes	%	±%
Conservative	Bob Saunders*	2,148	66.5	
Conservative	Anthony Burrows*	2,122		
Conservative	Geoffrey Woods*	1,970		
Labour	Stephen Spencer	1,080	33.5	
Labour	David Gallard	958		
Labour	Nigel Percival	891		
Turnout			79.5	
Registered electors		4,059		
Conservative win (new seat)				
Conservative win (new seat)				
Conservative win (new seat)				

Letchworth Wilbury ward
Party	Candidate	Votes	%	±%
Conservative	Ray Bloxham*	1,509	43.7	
Conservative	Keith Emsall*	1,394		
Labour	Ian Mantle	1,357	39.3	
Conservative	Jeffrey Smith	1,298		
Labour	David Evans*	1,290		
Labour	Mainie Briercliffe	1,270		
Liberal	Ian McGinley	587	17.0	
Turnout			85.0	
Registered electors		4,062		
Conservative hold		Swing		
Conservative hold		Swing		
Labour gain from Conservative		Swing		

Newsells ward
Party	Candidate	Votes	%	±%
Conservative	Robert Wilkerson*	736	79.6	
Labour	Anthony Pettit	189	20.4	
Turnout			79.5	
Registered electors		1,164		
Conservative win (new seat)				

Offa ward
Party	Candidate	Votes	%	±%
Conservative	Rosalie Fitzgerald	541	45.0	
Labour	David Kendall*	358	29.8	
Liberal	David Jamieson	304	25.3	
Turnout			81.7	
Registered electors		1,473		
Conservative win (new seat)				

Royston East ward
Party	Candidate	Votes	%	±%
Conservative	Pat Rule* (Note: Pat Rule had been elected as an independent in 1976, but she stood as a Conservative in 1979.)	1,843	58.2	
Conservative	Francis John Smith*	1,822		
Liberal	Sydney Charles McLennan	672	21.2	
Labour	Robert Pratt	650	20.5	
Labour	John Walker	577		
Turnout			85.5	
Registered electors		3,701		
Conservative win (new seat)				
Conservative win (new seat)				

Royston West ward
Party	Candidate	Votes	%	±%
Conservative	Duncan Ferguson	1,807	51.9	
Conservative	Harold Greenfield	1,590		
Conservative	Andrew Emms	1,379		
Labour	Alan Evans	883	25.3	
Liberal	Hazel Lord	795	22.8	
Labour	Jessie Etheridge	739		
Labour	Michael Kernaghan	684		
Liberal	Eric Harlow	(Note: Result obscured in source.)		
Turnout			83.2	
Registered electors		4,188		
Conservative win (new seat)				
Conservative win (new seat)				
Conservative win (new seat)				

Sandon ward
Party	Candidate	Votes	%	±%
Conservative	Esther Brookes*	734	82.6	
Labour	Jenny Weetch	155	17.4	
Turnout			80.5	
Registered electors		1,105		
Conservative win (new seat)				

Weston ward
Party	Candidate	Votes	%	±%
Conservative	Robert Evans*	653	69.8	
Labour	Mick Donaghue	282	30.2	
Turnout			82.9	
Registered electors		1,128		
Conservative win (new seat)				
