= 1984 North Hertfordshire District Council election =

Council election in England

← 1983	3 May 1984	1986 →

17 of 50 seats on North Hertfordshire District Council 26 seats needed for a majority
	First party	Second party	Third party
	Con	Lab	RA
Leader	Bob Flatman	Ian Mantle
Party	Conservative	Labour	Ratepayers
Seats before	30	15	2
Seats after	31	12	3
Seat change	▲1	▼3	▲1
	Fourth party	Fifth party	Sixth party
	Ind	Lib	SDP
Party	Independent	Liberal	SDP
Seats before	2	0	1
Seats after	2	1	1
Seat change	Steady	▲1	Steady
Leader before election
Bob Flatman
Conservative
Leader after election
Bob Flatman
Conservative

The 1984 North Hertfordshire District Council election was held on 3 May 1984, at the same time as other local elections across England and Scotland. There were 17 out of 50 seats on North Hertfordshire District Council up for election, being the usual third of the council.

The Conservatives remained in overall control of the council, increasing their majority by one seat. Labour lost three seats, despite its share of the vote actually increasing compared to the 1983 election. The Labour group leader, Ian Mantle, was one of those who lost his seat.

== Overall results ==
The overall results were as follows:

1984 North Hertfordshire District Council election
Party	This election			Full council			This election		
Party	Seats	Net	Seats %	Other	Total	Total %	Votes	Votes %	+/−
Conservative	9	▲1	52.9	22	31	62.0	13,805	39.0	-3.1
Labour	5	▼3	29.4	7	12	24.0	11,434	32.3	+3.2
Alliance	1	▲1	5.9	1	2	4.0	8,517	24.1	0.0
Ratepayers	1	▲1	5.9	2	3	6.0	1,094	3.1	-1.6
Independent	1	Steady	5.9	1	2	4.0	525	1.5	+1.5

Liberal and SDP votes are counted together in the summary above as part of the Alliance. In the ward results below, where the individual party affiliation of Alliance candidates was reported it is shown instead.

== Ward results ==
The results for each ward were as follows. An asterisk (*) indicates a sitting councillor standing for re-election.

Ashbrook ward
Party	Candidate	Votes	%	±%
Conservative	Michael Tatham*	633	55.4	−6.8
Labour	Keith Brydon	311	27.2	−10.6
Alliance	John Seabrook	199	17.4	+17.4
Turnout			55.6	
Registered electors		2,057		
Conservative hold		Swing	+1.9	

Baldock ward
Party	Candidate	Votes	%	±%
Labour	Alan Moir	1,163	40.8	+5.2
Conservative	Alan Ford	1,050	36.9	−10.4
Alliance	Bill Gore	636	22.3	+5.2
Turnout			48.8	
Registered electors		5,839		
Labour hold		Swing	+7.8	

Cadwell ward
Party	Candidate	Votes	%	±%
Independent	Ron Lodge	525	61.0	+1.7
Labour	Mark Baker	205	23.8	+5.3
SDP	Ann Milner	130	15.1	+15.1
Turnout			48.5	
Registered electors		1,773		
Independent hold		Swing	-1.8	

Hitchin Bearton ward
Party	Candidate	Votes	%	±%
Labour	Judi Billing* (Note: Previously elected in 1980 as Judi Smith.)	1,056	47.0	+9.5
Conservative	Jean Saunders	893	39.7	−1.9
SDP	Harry Shipley	299	13.3	−3.5
Turnout			50.5	
Registered electors		4,450		
Labour hold		Swing	+5.7	

Hitchin Highbury ward
Party	Candidate	Votes	%	±%
Conservative	Phillip MacCormack*	1,247	51.9	−13.8
SDP	Mary Burton	772	32.1	+11.8
Labour	Teresa Trangmar	386	16.0	+1.9
Turnout			47.1	
Registered electors		5,105		
Conservative hold		Swing	-12.8	

Hitchin Oughton ward
Party	Candidate	Votes	%	±%
Labour	Martin Stears*	1,096	60.4	+6.1
Conservative	Derrick Ashley	459	25.3	−7.2
Alliance	Lorna Maclean	260	14.3	+1.2
Turnout			41.5	
Registered electors		4,377		
Labour hold		Swing	+6.7	

Hitchin Priory ward
Party	Candidate	Votes	%	±%
Conservative	Frank Howett*	858	67.7	+2.7
SDP	Aileen Burford-Mason	275	21.7	−6.5
Labour	Nigel Agar	135	10.6	+3.8
Turnout			45.8	
Registered electors		2,769		
Conservative hold		Swing	+4.6	

Hitchin Walsworth ward
Party	Candidate	Votes	%	±%
Ratepayers	Chris Parker	1,094	36.2	−10.2
Labour	Veronica Sharp	938	31.0	+6.2
Conservative	Julian Glynne Jones (Glynne Jones)	595	19.7	+1.0
Alliance	Jenny Sefton	397	13.1	+3.1
Turnout			50.9	
Registered electors		5,941		
Ratepayers gain from Labour		Swing	-8.2	

Knebworth ward
Party	Candidate	Votes	%	±%
Conservative	Margaret Hilton	797	52.1	−5.9
Alliance	Andy Hudson	445	29.1	+8.8
Labour	Brian Kelly	288	18.8	−1.1
Turnout			48.0	
Registered electors		3,188		
Conservative hold		Swing	-7.4	

Letchworth East ward
Party	Candidate	Votes	%	±%
Labour	Headley Parkins*	1,073	43.3	+3.2
Alliance	Martin Fisher	871	35.1	+2.9
Conservative	Nicholas King	536	21.6	−6.1
Turnout			42.5	
Registered electors		5,841		
Labour hold		Swing	+0.2	

Letchworth Grange ward
Party	Candidate	Votes	%	±%
Labour	David Kearns*	1,122	41.1	+3.9
SDP	Brian Nicholson	934	34.2	−0.7
Conservative	Richard Sturman	673	24.7	−3.3
Turnout			52.7	
Registered electors		5,179		
Labour hold		Swing	+2.3	

Letchworth South East ward
Party	Candidate	Votes	%	±%
Conservative	Gordon Whalley	1,173	34.2	−2.1
SDP	David Attwood	1,150	33.5	−4.1
Labour	David Evans*	1,107	32.3	+6.2
Turnout			57.6	
Registered electors		5,954		
Conservative gain from Labour		Swing	+1.0	

Letchworth South West ward
Party	Candidate	Votes	%	±%
Conservative	Geoffrey Woods*	1,294	54.3	−0.7
Labour	John Preston	596	25.0	+0.8
Liberal	Rosemary Ryden	494	20.7	−0.1
Turnout			53.1	
Registered electors		4,491		
Conservative hold		Swing	-0.8	

Letchworth Wilbury ward
Party	Candidate	Votes	%	±%
Conservative	Ray Bloxham	1,062	44.4	+2.4
Labour	Ian Mantle*	1,007	42.1	−3.1
Alliance	Hans Mulder	325	13.6	+0.7
Turnout			59.6	
Registered electors		4,016		
Conservative gain from Labour		Swing	+2.8	

Royston East ward
Party	Candidate	Votes	%	±%
Conservative	Francis John Smith* (John Smith)	1,133	72.4	+17.3
Labour	Mandy Webb	432	27.6	+16.7
Turnout			39.2	
Registered electors		3,996		
Conservative hold		Swing	+0.3	

Royston West ward
Party	Candidate	Votes	%	±%
Liberal	Harold Margolis	1,157	46.3	+3.0
Conservative	Terence Bernard Botfield* (Terry Botfield)	943	37.8	−5.8
Labour	Eunice King	397	15.9	+2.8
Turnout			46.9	
Registered electors		5,319		
Liberal gain from Conservative		Swing	+4.4	

Weston ward
Party	Candidate	Votes	%	±%
Conservative	Robert Evans*	459	60.9	−3.6
Alliance	Gary Barker	173	22.9	+22.9
Labour	Roger McFall	122	16.2	−19.3
Turnout			54.0	
Registered electors		1,396		
Conservative hold		Swing	-13.3	

== Changes 1984–1986 ==
Two by-elections were held on 28 March 1985. The by-election in Cadwell ward was triggered by the death of independent councillor Ron Lodge, and the by-election in Letchworth South West ward was triggered by the resignation of Conservative councillor John Talbot. The SDP–Liberal Alliance won the Letchworth South West seat from the Conservatives. In Cadwell ward the Conservatives won the seat which had previously been independent.

Cadwell ward by-election, 28 March 1985
Party	Candidate	Votes	%	±%
Conservative	Linda Turner	293	37.7	−23.4
SDP	John Seabrook	275	35.3	+11.5
Labour	Jan Gosling	210	27.0	+11.9
Conservative gain from Independent		Swing	-17.5	

Letchworth South West ward by-election, 28 March 1985
Party	Candidate	Votes	%	±%
Liberal	William Armitage	1,202	45.5	+24.7
Conservative	Ron Edwards	937	35.4	−18.8
Labour	Bill Miller	505	19.1	−5.9
Liberal gain from Conservative		Swing	+21.8	
