= 1976 North Hertfordshire District Council election =

Council election in England

← 1973	6 May 1976	1979 →

All 48 seats on North Hertfordshire District Council 25 seats needed for a majority
	First party	Second party
	Con	Lab
Leader	Bob Flatman	John Goldsmith
Party	Conservative	Labour
Seats before	23	17
Seats after	30	11
Seat change	▲7	▼6
	Third party	Fourth party
	Ind	RA
Leader		Ken Logan
Party	Independent	Ratepayers
Seats before	7	1
Seats after	5	2
Seat change	▼2	▲1
Leader before election
Bob Flatman
Conservative
No overall control
Leader after election
Bob Flatman
Conservative

The 1976 North Hertfordshire District Council election was held on 6 May 1976, at the same time as other local elections across England and Wales. All 48 seats on North Hertfordshire District Council were up for election.

The election saw the Conservatives take a majority of the seats on the council, which had previously been under no overall control, being led by a Conservative minority administration. The Conservative group leader, Bob Flatman, continued to serve as leader of the council after the election. The Labour group leader, John Goldsmith, lost his seat and was replaced as group leader by Bill Miller.

== Overall results ==
The overall results were as follows:

North Hertfordshire District Council Election, 1976
Party	Seats	Gains	Losses	Net gain/loss	Seats %	Votes %	Votes	+/−
Conservative	30	7	0	+7	62.5	49.8	19,994	+7.1
Labour	11	0	6	-6	22.9	28.8	11,566	-4.0
Independent	5	0	2	-2	10.4	12.3	4,938	-7.3
Ratepayers	2	1	0	+1	4.2	5.2	2,082	+2.1
Liberal	0				0.0	3.9	1,545	+2.1

== Ward results ==
The results for each ward were as follows. An asterisk(*) indicates a sitting councillor standing for re-election. A double dagger (‡) indicates a sitting councillor contesting a different ward.

Ward 1: Baldock
Party	Candidate	Votes	%	±%
Independent	Nora Burgess*	1,240	40.3	−0.1
Conservative	Roger Gazely	873	28.4	+2.7
Conservative	John Barton*	839		
Labour	George York*	716	23.3	−3.8
Labour	Stanley Watson	628		
Labour	Roger McFall	607		
Conservative	Alfred Bickell	511		
Liberal	Ronald Littleford (Ron Littleford)	248	8.1	+1.2
Turnout			46.4	
Registered electors		6,631		
Independent hold		Swing	-1.4	
Conservative gain from Labour		Swing		
Conservative hold		Swing		

Ward 2: Hitchin Oughton
Party	Candidate	Votes	%	±%
Labour	Audrey Carss*	1,038	55.2	+2.4
Labour	Jim Reilly*	957		
Labour	David Kendall	902		
Conservative	Raymond Shanks	841	44.8	+18.6
Conservative	John Wallace	836		
Conservative	Andree Boddington	714		
Turnout			49.0	
Registered electors		3,835		
Labour hold		Swing	-8.1	
Labour hold		Swing		
Labour hold		Swing		

Ward 3: Hitchin Bearton
Party	Candidate	Votes	%	±%
Conservative	David Ingram	1,063	64.0	+7.0
Conservative	David Roberts	1,048		
Labour	Keith Ruff	450	27.1	−15.9
Labour	Brian Abrahams	408		
Liberal	George Fisher	148	8.9	+8.9
Liberal	Christopher Freel	115		
Turnout			47.0	
Registered electors		3,534		
Conservative hold		Swing	+11.5	
Conservative hold		Swing		

Ward 4: Hitchin Priory
Party	Candidate	Votes	%	±%
Conservative	Robert Stanley Flatman* (Bob Flatman)	1,372	74.3	+14.8
Conservative	Derek Alfred Doel*	1,272		
Conservative	Michael John Frederick Hillman ‡	1,212		
Labour	William Edward Harmer	322	17.4	+1.0
Labour	Doris Marian Reilly	311		
Labour	Crystal Anne Toleman	294		
Liberal	Jane Elizabeth Brine	152	8.2	−15.8
Liberal	Handel Thomas Robert Leonard	152		
Turnout			41.9	
Registered electors		4,406		
Conservative hold		Swing	+6.9	
Conservative hold		Swing		
Conservative hold		Swing		

Ward 5: Hitchin Walsworth
Party	Candidate	Votes	%	±%
Ratepayers	Kenneth William Logan* (Ken Logan)	1,555	42.5	+10.4
Ratepayers	Brian Robert Worbey	1,276		
Labour	Frederick George Peacock (Fred Peacock)	1,106	30.2	−6.5
Conservative	Frederick Stanley Scott (Fred Scott)	1,001	27.3	−3.9
Labour	John Henry Goldsmith*	812		
Labour	Martin John Stears	726		
Turnout			57.4	
Registered electors		6,380		
Ratepayers hold		Swing	+8.5	
Ratepayers gain from Labour		Swing		
Labour hold		Swing		

Ward 6: Hitchin Highbury
Party	Candidate	Votes	%	±%
Conservative	Beryl Faith Wearmouth*	1,726	80.2	+26.9
Conservative	Stephen Arthur Whaley	1,597		
Conservative	Betty May Goble	1,594		
Labour	Walter Patrick Guymer	425	19.8	+7.7
Labour	Stewart Patrick Faulkner	360		
Labour	Harold Alexander Smith	336		
Turnout			52.0	
Registered electors		4,137		
Conservative hold		Swing	+9.6	
Conservative hold		Swing		
Conservative hold		Swing		

Ward 7: Letchworth Norton
Party	Candidate	Votes	%	±%
Labour	Bill Miller*	1,467	47.1	−15.7
Labour	David Evans	1,461		
Labour	Donald Kitchiner* (Don Kitchiner)	1,458		
Labour	Rodney Playford	1,435		
Conservative	William Charles Bifield (Charles Bifield)	1,288	41.4	+4.2
Conservative	Walter Gurney	1,276		
Conservative	Barry Jackson	1,196		
Conservative	Dominic Alphonsus Murphy	1,091		
Independent	Roger Leach	358	11.5	+11.5
Turnout			48.9	
Registered electors		6,366		
Labour hold		Swing	-10.0	
Labour hold		Swing		
Labour hold		Swing		
Labour hold		Swing		

Ward 8: Letchworth Pixmore
Party	Candidate	Votes	%	±%
Labour	Ernest Brown* (Ernie Brown)	1,374	67.5	−7.8
Labour	David Arthur Griffiths*	1,322		
Labour	Reginald Hall*	1,301		
Conservative	Jean May Sherwood	662	32.5	+7.8
Conservative	Pauline Margaret Wood	637		
Conservative	Richard Edward Markiewicz	619		
Turnout			44.9	
Registered electors		4,535		
Labour hold		Swing	-7.8	
Labour hold		Swing		
Labour hold		Swing		

Ward 9: Letchworth Wilbury
Party	Candidate	Votes	%	±%
Conservative	Raynor Bloxham (Ray Bloxham)	1,182	53.2	+12.7
Conservative	Roland Baker	1,156		
Conservative	Paul Shipman	1,136		
Labour	Mamie Briercliffe*	1,041	46.8	−12.7
Labour	David Gallard*	1,020		
Labour	Ian Mantle*	933		
Turnout			57.8	
Registered electors		3,846		
Conservative gain from Labour		Swing	+12.7	
Conservative gain from Labour		Swing		
Conservative gain from Labour		Swing		

Ward 10: Letchworth Westbury
Party	Candidate	Votes	%	±%
Conservative	Clifford John Marshall*	1,011	65.5	+11.0
Conservative	Geoffrey Peter Woods (Geoff Woods)	921		
Labour	Headley Valentine Parkins	533	34.5	−11.0
Labour	Ormond Paul Simpson	517		
Turnout			66.8	
Registered electors		2,311		
Conservative hold		Swing	+11.0	
Conservative hold		Swing		

Ward 11: Letchworth Central and Willian
Party	Candidate	Votes	%	±%
Conservative	Anthony Gregory Burrows	1,786	83.0	+23.1
Conservative	Robert Saunders* (Bob Saunders)	1,742		
Labour	Henry Fuller	366	17.0	+2.9
Turnout			55.1	
Registered electors		3,906		
Conservative hold		Swing	+10.1	
Conservative hold		Swing		

Ward 12: Royston
Party	Candidate	Votes	%	±%
Conservative	Francis John Smith* (John Smith)	1,998	39.2	+2.6
Independent	George William Stevens*	1,673	32.8	−9.9
Independent	Patricia Rule* (Pat Rule)	1,672		
Independent	Phillip Leslie Gray*	1,350		
Conservative	Terence Botfield	1,258		
Conservative	Christopher McMichael	1,124		
Conservative	Howard Marshall	1,095		
Labour	Robert Douglas Beckwith	815	16.0	−4.8
Labour	Alan Evans	767		
Labour	Peter Ball	675		
Liberal	Hazel Priscilla Lord	615	12.1	+12.1
Labour	Michael William Kernaghan	603		
Liberal	Anthony Perkins	406		
Turnout			52.8	
Registered electors		9,661		
Conservative hold		Swing	+6.3	
Independent hold		Swing		
Independent hold		Swing		
Independent hold		Swing		

Ward 13: Ashwell, Bygrave, Caldecote, Clothall, Graveley, Hinxworth, Newnham, Radwell and Weston
Party	Candidate	Votes	%	±%
Conservative	Robert Evans*	950	69.3	+34.9
Conservative	John Stapleton	926		
Labour	John Schofield	420	30.7	+16.6
Labour	John Summers	307		
Turnout			53.2	
Registered electors		2,575		
Conservative hold		Swing	+9.2	
Conservative gain from Independent		Swing		

Ward 14: Barkway, Barley, Kelshall, Nuthampstead, Reed, Rushden, Sandon, Therfield and Wallington
Party	Candidate	Votes	%	±%
Conservative	Esther Brookes*	781	55.1	−0.4
Conservative	Ian Rose*	662		
Independent	Fraser William Field	511	36.1	+3.7
Labour	Nigel Pratt	125	8.8	−3.3
Labour	Anthony Pettit (Tony Pettit)	108		
Turnout			55.0	
Registered electors		2,576		
Conservative hold		Swing	-2.1	
Conservative hold		Swing		

Ward 15: Ippollitts, Kimpton, Langley, Preston, St Paul's Walden and Wymondley
Party	Candidate	Votes	%	±%
Conservative	David Gilbert	1,542	76.8	−0.7
Conservative	Leslie Rabbitts	1,523		
Conservative	John Raffell*	1,523		
Labour	Pauline Oakley	466	23.2	+0.7
Labour	Frances Mary Polly	464		
Labour	Jennifer Fitzpatrick	387		
Turnout			49.5	
Registered electors		4,057		
Conservative hold		Swing	-0.7	
Conservative hold		Swing		
Conservative hold		Swing		

Ward 16: Codicote
Party	Candidate	Votes	%	±%
Conservative	Denis Wallace Charles Winch*	unopposed		
Registered electors		2,052		
Conservative hold		Swing		

Ward 17: Knebworth
Party	Candidate	Votes	%	±%
Conservative	Gordon Cartwright Dumelow*	727	48.0	+7.8
Conservative	Alfred James Grosse*	555		
Ratepayers	Anthony Tomlinson	527	34.8	+14.7
Ratepayers	Ronald Charles Gilbert	309		
Labour	Martin Harvey Lisles	262	17.3	−4.3
Turnout			53.6	
Registered electors		2,828		
Conservative hold		Swing	-3.5	
Conservative hold		Swing		

Ward 18: Hexton, Holwell, Ickleford, King's Walden, Lilley, Offley and Pirton
Party	Candidate	Votes	%	±%
Conservative	Brian Feaver	1,191	35.4	+7.9
Independent	Ronald Alfred Lodge* (Ron Lodge)	1,156	34.3	−3.3
Conservative	John Charles Jackson	1,038		
Conservative	Mary Middleton	972		
Labour	Raymond Cousins	640	19.0	−16.0
Labour	Clive Hugh Godfrey	549		
Labour	Anthony James Brown	518		
Liberal	Sarah Ann Lowe	382	11.3	+11.3
Turnout			53.6	
Registered electors		6,285		
Conservative gain from Independent		Swing	+5.6	
Independent hold		Swing		
Conservative gain from Labour		Swing		

== Changes 1976–1979 ==
Five by-elections were held on 6 April 1978, following the simultaneous resignations of five Conservative councillors on 13 February 1978. All five seats were retained by the Conservatives.

Ward 3: Hitchin Bearton by-election, 6 April 1978
Party	Candidate	Votes	%	±%
Conservative	Fred Scott	787	48.9	−15.1
Labour	Martin Stears	659	40.9	+13.8
National Party	Bob Aylott	63	3.9	+3.9
Liberal	Sarah Low	55	3.4	−5.5
Ratepayers	Jack Swain	46	2.9	+2.9
Turnout			46.3	
Conservative hold		Swing	-14.5	

The Hitchin Bearton by-election was triggered by the resignation of Conservative councillor David Ingram, citing business reasons.

Ward 6: Hitchin Highbury by-election, 6 April 1978
Party	Candidate	Votes	%	±%
Conservative	Stuart Grantham	1,036	59.0	−21.3
Ratepayers	Bert Moore	448	25.5	+25.5
Labour	John Joshua	273	15.5	−4.2
Turnout			41.8	
Conservative hold		Swing	-23.4	

The Hitchin Highbury by-election was triggered by the resignation of Conservative councillor Stephen Arthur Whaley, who had moved away from the district.

Ward 9: Letchworth Wilbury by-election, 6 April 1978
Party	Candidate	Votes	%	±%
Conservative	Keith Emsall	1,091	48.7	−4.4
Labour	Ian Mantle	1,039	46.4	−0.4
Liberal	Ian McGinlay	109	4.9	+4.9
Turnout			54.9	
Conservative hold		Swing	-2.0	

The Letchworth Wilbury by-election was triggered by the resignation of Conservative councillor Roland Baker, who also resigned from the party citing disillusionment with Conservative party policy.

Ward 13: Ashwell, Bygrave, Caldecote, Clothall, Graveley, Hinxworth, Newnham, Radwell and Weston by-election, 6 April 1978
Party	Candidate	Votes	%	±%
Conservative	John Sheldrick	841	74.8	+5.5
Labour	John Schofield	283	25.2	−5.5
Turnout			40.1	
Conservative hold		Swing	+5.5	

The Ward 13 by-election was triggered by the resignation of Conservative councillor John Stapleton, who had moved away from the district.

Ward 14: Barkway, Barley, Kelshall, Nuthampstead, Reed, Rushden, Sandon, Therfield and Wallington by-election, 6 April 1978
Party	Candidate	Votes	%	±%
Conservative	Bob Wilkerson	922	89.6	+34.5
Labour	Peter Ball	107	10.4	+1.6
Turnout			46.5	
Conservative hold		Swing	+16.5	

The Ward 14 by-election was triggered by the resignation of Conservative councillor Ian Rose, citing business reasons.
