= Tony McWalter =

British politician

Member of Parliament for Hemel Hempstead
- In office 1 May 1997 – 11 April 2005
- Preceded by: Constituency Created
- Succeeded by: Mike Penning

Personal details
- Born: 20 March 1945 (age 81) Worksop, Nottinghamshire England
- Party: Labour Co-operative
- Spouse: Karen Omer
- Education: Aberystwyth University, McMaster University, University College, Oxford

Joseph Anthony McWalter, generally known as Tony McWalter, (born 20 March 1945 in Worksop) is a politician in the United Kingdom. He was the Labour Party and Co-operative member of parliament for Hemel Hempstead between 1997 and 2005.

== Early life ==
=== Education ===
He went to the independent catholic St Benedict's School in Ealing. At the University College of Wales, Aberystwyth, he gained a BSc in Pure Maths in 1967, and a BSc in philosophy in 1968. At McMaster University in Hamilton, Ontario, Canada, he gained an MA in Philosophy in 1968. At University College, Oxford, he gained a BPhil in Philosophy in 1971 and he was offered the degree of MLitt in 1983.

=== Career ===
From 1963 to 1964, he was a teacher at the catholic Cardinal Wiseman secondary school in Greenford, west London. From 1964 to 1967, he was periodically a lorry driver for EH Paterson Ltd. From 1968 to 1969, he was a teaching fellow at McMaster University.

He is a former philosophy lecturer at the University of Hertfordshire in Hatfield, beginning when it was known as Hatfield Polytechnic in 1974. He also lectured at Thames Polytechnic (now called the University of Greenwich) from 1972 to 1974. In the late 1980s he was Director of Computing at the university's education campus at Wall Hall.

McWalter's principal academic interest is in the philosophy of Kant, and with George MacDonald Ross he co-edited Kant and His Influence.

Following his electoral defeat in 2005, McWalter established an educational consultancy business offering one to one tuition in mathematics and the sciences. In this role he taught again at the University of Hertfordshire, teaching mathematics on a contract basis until 2007. In 2007 he was appointed as an associate lecturer at the Open University mathematics department (London region): and in 2010 he gained qualified teacher status from the Institute of Education (London University). He is a key stage five specialist teacher at The Thomas Alleyne Academy in Stevenage, teaching mathematics and physics.

== Political career ==
McWalter served as a Labour councillor on North Hertfordshire District Council from the 1979 election until 1983, representing the Letchworth East ward.

He contested St Albans in 1987 and Luton North in 1992. He also contested two European Parliament seats, Hertfordshire (1984) and Bedfordshire South (1989).

McWalter won the Hemel Hempstead seat from Robert Jones (Conservative) in 1997 and held it in 2001, and was narrowly defeated by 499 votes by Mike Penning (Conservative) in 2005.

Early in his Westminster career, McWalter was one of a number of Labour MPs who petitioned for a planned cut in single-parents benefits, scheduled by the previous Conservative administration, to be cancelled before it came into effect. The cancellation of the cut was announced but then later revoked. McWalter abstained on the first vote in the Commons on implementing the cut. On later votes on the Welfare Reform bill McWalter voted with the government, but he did so having secured amendments on mobility allowance for disabled children aged between three and five, and on the bereavement allowance (which had been scheduled to be cut to six months so that widowers and widows could be given equal treatment). McWalter often cites this as evidence that it is possible for backbenchers to get laws beneficially amended.

McWalter served on the Northern Ireland select committee during the extraordinary period before and after the Good Friday Agreement. McWalter also served on the Procedure Committee, where his principal concern was the treatment of bill committees in the House. Specifically, the whips would only appoint "nodding dogs", and many clauses would be left both unamended and even undebated.

On 27 February 2002, McWalter asked the prime minister the following question: "My right hon. Friend is sometimes subject to rather unflattering or even malevolent descriptions of his motivation. Will he provide the House with a brief characterisation of the political philosophy that he espouses and which underlies his policies?" The prime minister was famously confused. McWalter later claimed that he was annoyed by the constant theme in government that seemed to suggest that the main justification for a policy was that it was "modern". McWalter also claimed that the prime minister had had four days' notice of the question, and that his only motive was to get a carefully thought-out and principled response.

McWalter hosted three adjournment debates which have been read widely. One was on the teaching of philosophy on 1 July 1999, and it was circulated in academic circles as a concise justification for why the subject is important. It attracted independent laudatory notes from Bernard Williams and Simon Blackburn (professors of philosophy at Oxford and Cambridge respectively). A second debate by him on mathematics ("quadratic equations") was reprinted by the British Association for the History of Mathematics and by the American equivalent body, and is cited by Puzzi in a recent text "The Equation They Couldn't Solve".

The third debate for which McWalter is known was on scientific research. From 2001 he served on the Science and Technology select committee. At his initiative the committee reported in 2004 on the inadequacy of the current research council arrangements for funding research which would be of most immediate use for African countries: The report was strongly commended by the then secretary of state for international development (Hilary Benn) but despite that the report's fundamental recommendation (to inaugurate a research council especially for subjects germane to the interests of developing nations) was not acted on. Following the report McWalter hosted a "Science for Africa" debate, but he could not extract from the Minister an agreement to work to change research council structures.

McWalter was one of the one hundred and thirty nine Labour MPs who voted against the principal resolution on the Iraq war on 20 March 2003.

== Personal life ==
He married Karen Omer on 30 March 1991. He has one stepson and two daughters.

Parliament of the United Kingdom
| New constituency | Member of Parliament for Hemel Hempstead; 1997–2005 | Succeeded by Mike Penning |
