= 2004 North Hertfordshire District Council election =

Council election in England

| ← 2003 | 10 June 2004 | 2006 → |

17 of 49 seats on North Hertfordshire District Council 25 seats needed for a majority
| | First party | Second party | Third party |
|---|---|---|---|
| | Con | Lab | LD |
| Leader | F. John Smith | David Kearns | Steve Jarvis |
| Party | Conservative | Labour | Liberal Democrats |
| Seats before | 27 | 16 | 6 |
| Seats after | 28 | 14 | 7 |
| Seat change | ▲1 | ▼2 | ▲1 |
- Results of the 2004 North Hertfordshire District Council election
Leader before election
F. John Smith
Conservative
Leader after election
F. John Smith
Conservative

The 2004 North Hertfordshire District Council election was held on 10 June 2004, at the same time as other local elections across England and Wales and the European elections. 17 of the 49 seats on North Hertfordshire District Council were up for election, being the usual third of the council plus a by-election in Knebworth ward.

== Overall results ==
The overall results were as follows:

2004 North Hertfordshire District Council election
| Party | This election | | | Full council | | | This election | | |
| Party | Seats | Net | Seats % | Other | Total | Total % | Votes | Votes % | +/− |
|---|---|---|---|---|---|---|---|---|---|
| Conservative | 12 | ▲1 | 70.6 | 16 | 28 | 57.1 | 13,793 | 46.4 | +0.4 |
| Liberal Democrats | 1 | ▲1 | 5.9 | 6 | 7 | 14.3 | 7,998 | 26.9 | -3.3 |
| Labour | 4 | ▼2 | 23.5 | 10 | 14 | 28.6 | 7,090 | 23.9 | +1.9 |
| Green | 0 | Steady | 0.0 | 0 | 0 | 0.0 | 819 | 2.8 | +1.1 |

== Ward results ==
The results for each ward were as follows. An asterisk (*) indicates a sitting councillor standing for re-election.

Baldock Town ward
| Party | Candidate | Votes | % | ±% |
|---|---|---|---|---|
| Conservative | Ian Knighton* | 1,375 | 61.8 | +4.3 |
| Labour | Paul Burgin | 459 | 20.6 | −6.6 |
| Liberal Democrats | Marilyn Kirkland | 391 | 17.6 | +2.3 |
| Turnout | | | 40.5 | |
| Registered electors | | 5,838 | | |
| Conservative hold | | Swing | +5.5 | |

Hitchin Bearton ward
| Party | Candidate | Votes | % | ±% |
|---|---|---|---|---|
| Labour | Martin Stears* | 816 | 38.3 | −11.7 |
| Conservative | Andrew Hyde | 626 | 29.4 | +2.5 |
| Liberal Democrats | Ronald Clark | 378 | 17.8 | +2.9 |
| Green | George Howe | 309 | 14.5 | +6.4 |
| Turnout | | | 39.1 | |
| Registered electors | | 5,434 | | |
| Labour hold | | Swing | -7.1 | |

Hitchin Highbury ward
| Party | Candidate | Votes | % | ±% |
|---|---|---|---|---|
| Conservative | Sarah Wren | 1,265 | 45.8 | +4.4 |
| Liberal Democrats | David Shirley | 1,205 | 43.6 | −8.4 |
| Labour | Kushminder Sahasi | 177 | 6.4 | −0.1 |
| Green | Anthony Ware | 114 | 4.1 | +4.1 |
| Turnout | | | 50.0 | |
| Registered electors | | 5,543 | | |
| Conservative hold | | Swing | +6.4 | |

Hitchin Oughton ward
| Party | Candidate | Votes | % | ±% |
|---|---|---|---|---|
| Labour | Joan Kirby* | 581 | 48.1 | −10.5 |
| Conservative | Nigel Brook | 377 | 31.2 | +3.7 |
| Liberal Democrats | Richard Canning | 251 | 20.8 | +6.8 |
| Turnout | | | 32.7 | |
| Registered electors | | 3,719 | | |
| Labour hold | | Swing | -7.1 | |

Hitchin Priory ward
| Party | Candidate | Votes | % | ±% |
|---|---|---|---|---|
| Conservative | Richard Thake* | 1,106 | 60.1 | −4.3 |
| Liberal Democrats | Andrew Ircha | 473 | 25.7 | +5.3 |
| Labour | Douglas McCall | 261 | 14.2 | −1.0 |
| Turnout | | | 46.2 | |
| Registered electors | | 4,016 | | |
| Conservative hold | | Swing | -4.8 | |

Hitchin Walsworth ward
| Party | Candidate | Votes | % | ±% |
|---|---|---|---|---|
| Conservative | Raymond Shakespeare-Smith | 926 | 41.1 | +4.7 |
| Labour | Philip Kirk* | 797 | 35.4 | −7.1 |
| Liberal Democrats | Ingeborg Sutcliffe | 324 | 14.4 | +1.0 |
| Green | Evelyn Howe | 204 | 9.1 | +1.4 |
| Turnout | | | 41.4 | |
| Registered electors | | 5,460 | | |
| Conservative gain from Labour | | Swing | +5.9 | |

Hitchwood ward
| Party | Candidate | Votes | % | ±% |
|---|---|---|---|---|
| Conservative | David Miller | 582 | 67.8 | −9.4 |
| Liberal Democrats | Michael Lott | 183 | 21.3 | +15.1 |
| Labour | Robert Whatson | 94 | 10.9 | −5.7 |
| Turnout | | | 42.3 | |
| Registered electors | | 2,045 | | |
| Conservative hold | | Swing | -12.3 | |

Knebworth ward
| Party | Candidate | Votes | % | ±% |
|---|---|---|---|---|
| Conservative | Robin Wordsworth* | 924 | 51.8 | −10.1 |
| Conservative | Alan Bardett | 889 | 49.8 | −12.0 |
| Liberal Democrats | Debra Wilkins | 470 | 26.3 | +12.6 |
| Liberal Democrats | Ursula Winder | 219 | 12.3 | −1.4 |
| Labour | Anthony Eden | 198 | 11.1 | −8.8 |
| Green | Stuart Madgin | 192 | 10.8 | +6.3 |
| Turnout | | | 39.6 | |
| Registered electors | | 3,992 | | |
| Conservative hold | | Swing | -11.4 | |
| Conservative hold | | Swing | | |

The by-election in Knebworth was caused by the resignation of Conservative councillor Jane Gray.

Letchworth East ward
| Party | Candidate | Votes | % | ±% |
|---|---|---|---|---|
| Labour | Lorna Kercher* | 752 | 38.9 | +2.9 |
| Conservative | Evelyn Mitchell | 714 | 37.0 | −2.3 |
| Liberal Democrats | Martin Gammell | 466 | 24.1 | +5.2 |
| Turnout | | | 37.0 | |
| Registered electors | | 5,256 | | |
| Labour hold | | Swing | +2.6 | |

Letchworth Grange ward
| Party | Candidate | Votes | % | ±% |
|---|---|---|---|---|
| Conservative | Simon Bloxham | 727 | 39.7 | −0.3 |
| Labour | Arthur Jarman | 696 | 38.0 | −5.6 |
| Liberal Democrats | Samantha Turner | 410 | 22.4 | +5.8 |
| Turnout | | | 36.4 | |
| Registered electors | | 5,069 | | |
| Conservative gain from Labour | | Swing | +2.7 | |

Letchworth South East ward
| Party | Candidate | Votes | % | ±% |
|---|---|---|---|---|
| Conservative | Lawrence McNamara | 979 | 46.0 | −0.6 |
| Labour | Marion Melton | 665 | 31.3 | −5.5 |
| Liberal Democrats | John Winder | 484 | 22.7 | +6.1 |
| Turnout | | | 40.9 | |
| Registered electors | | 5,234 | | |
| Conservative hold | | Swing | +2.5 | |

Letchworth South West ward
| Party | Candidate | Votes | % | ±% |
|---|---|---|---|---|
| Conservative | Terence Hone* (Terry Hone) | 1,454 | 49.4 | 0.0 |
| Liberal Democrats | John Winder | 1,218 | 41.4 | −0.8 |
| Labour | Jacqueline Hartley | 269 | 9.1 | +0.8 |
| Turnout | | | 51.7 | |
| Registered electors | | 5,710 | | |
| Conservative hold | | Swing | +0.4 | |

Letchworth Wilbury ward
| Party | Candidate | Votes | % | ±% |
|---|---|---|---|---|
| Labour | Gary Grindal* | 548 | 42.3 | −11.9 |
| Conservative | Jessica Cook | 471 | 36.3 | +5.1 |
| Liberal Democrats | Marion Minards-Gammell | 278 | 21.4 | +6.7 |
| Turnout | | | 31.8 | |
| Registered electors | | 4,105 | | |
| Labour hold | | Swing | -8.5 | |

Royston Heath ward
| Party | Candidate | Votes | % | ±% |
|---|---|---|---|---|
| Conservative | Peter Burt* | 882 | 55.2 | +0.7 |
| Liberal Democrats | Roger Hill | 434 | 27.2 | +4.2 |
| Labour | Kenneth Garland | 282 | 17.6 | −10.8 |
| Turnout | | | 40.0 | |
| Registered electors | | 4,031 | | |
| Conservative hold | | Swing | -1.8 | |

Royston Meridian ward
| Party | Candidate | Votes | % | ±% |
|---|---|---|---|---|
| Conservative | Francis John Smith* | 867 | 56.6 | +3.5 |
| Liberal Democrats | John Ledden | 419 | 27.3 | +7.2 |
| Labour | Vaughan West | 247 | 16.1 | −10.7 |
| Turnout | | | 38.6 | |
| Registered electors | | 4,000 | | |
| Conservative hold | | Swing | -1.9 | |

Royston Palace ward
| Party | Candidate | Votes | % | ±% |
|---|---|---|---|---|
| Liberal Democrats | Robert Inwood | 614 | 44.5 | +44.5 |
| Conservative | Graham Palmer | 518 | 37.5 | −13.9 |
| Labour | Leslie Baker | 248 | 18.0 | −30.6 |
| Turnout | | | 36.1 | |
| Registered electors | | 3,855 | | |
| Liberal Democrats gain from Conservative | | Swing | +29.2 | |

== Changes 2004–2006 ==
A by-election was held in Hitchin Bearton ward on 5 May 2005, alongside the county council election and general election, to replace Labour councillor Peter Terry. Labour's Deepak Sangha retained the seat for the party.

A by-election was held on 17 November 2005 in Baldock East ward to replace Liberal Democrat councillor Geoffrey Hollands. The party retained the seat.

Baldock East By-Election 17 November 2005
| Party | Candidate | Votes | % | ±% |
|---|---|---|---|---|
| Liberal Democrats | Marilyn Kirkland | 331 | 48.2 | −4.8 |
| Conservative | Les Wilsher | 324 | 47.2 | +0.2 |
| Labour | Paul Burgin | 31 | 4.5 | +4.5 |
| Majority | | 7 | 1.0 | |
| Turnout | | 686 | 38.2 | |
| Liberal Democrats hold | | Swing | | |
