= 2000 North Hertfordshire District Council election =

Council election in England

← 1999	4 May 2000	2002 →

17 of 49 seats on North Hertfordshire District Council 25 seats needed for a majority
	First party	Second party	Third party
	Con	Lab	LD
Leader	F. John Smith	David Kearns	Steve Jarvis
Party	Conservative	Labour	Liberal Democrats
Seats before	28	18	3
Seats after	29	18	2
Seat change	▲1	Steady	▼1
Leader before election
F. John Smith
Conservative
Leader after election
F. John Smith
Conservative

The 2000 North Hertfordshire District Council election was held on 4 May 2000, at the same time as other local elections across England. 17 of the 49 seats on North Hertfordshire District Council were up for election, being the usual third plus a by-election in Hitchin Walsworth ward.

== Ward results ==
The results for each ward were as follows. An asterisk(*) indicates a sitting councillor standing for re-election.

Baldock Town ward
Party	Candidate	Votes	%	±%
Conservative	Ian Knighton*	1,120	57.1%	+2.5
Labour	Joanna White	679	34.6%	−7.4
Liberal Democrats	Ian Simpson	164	8.4%	−3.2
Turnout			34.5%	
Conservative hold		Swing	4.9	

Hitchin Bearton ward
Party	Candidate	Votes	%	±%
Labour	Martin Stears*	787	51.2%	−8.6
Conservative	Patricia Cherry	480	31.3%	−1.0
Liberal Democrats	Keith Catchpole	110	7.2%	−3.9
Natural Law	David Cooke	106	6.9%	0.0
Green	Nigel Howitt	53	3.5%	−8.0
Turnout			29.3%	
Labour hold		Swing	-3.8	

Hitchin Highbury ward
Party	Candidate	Votes	%	±%
Conservative	Lesley Greenwood*	1,061	47.4%	−10.4
Liberal Democrats	Paul Clark	928	41.5%	+3.0
Labour	Jonathan Newham	200	8.9%	−12.1
Green	Lydia Howitt	49	2.2%	−5.0
Turnout			40.9%	
Conservative hold		Swing	-6.7	

Hitchin Oughton ward
Party	Candidate	Votes	%	±%
Labour	Joan Kirby*	584	62.9%	−9.4
Conservative	Nigel Brook	266	28.7%	+6.4
Liberal Democrats	Ingeborg Sutcliffe	69	7.4%	−2.6
Natural Law	Lesley Relph	9	1%	+1.0
Turnout			24.9%	
Labour hold		Swing	-7.9	

Hitchin Priory ward
Party	Candidate	Votes	%	±%
Conservative	Richard Thake*	1,056	71.8%	−8.0
Labour	Peter Terry	248	16.9%	−13.4
Liberal Democrats	John Winder	166	11.3%	−14.5
Turnout			36.8%	
Conservative hold		Swing	2.7	

Hitchin Walsworth ward
Party	Candidate	Votes	%	±%
Labour	Philip Kirk	930	48.1%	+4.5
Conservative	Bernard Lovewell*	844	43.6%	−1.0
Labour	Robert Whatson	832	43%	
Conservative	Ray Shakespeare-Smith	782	40.4%	
Liberal Democrats	David Shirley	160	8.3%	−2.1
Green	George Howe	110	5.7%	−2.6
Natural Law	Russell Howard	31	1.6%	−1.6
Turnout			35.1%	
Labour gain from Conservative		Swing		
Conservative hold		Swing		

The by-election in Hitchin Walsworth ward was to replace Conservative councillor James Ashmore.

Hitchwood ward
Party	Candidate	Votes	%	±%
Conservative	Alan Calder*	659	77.2%	+2.1
Labour	Jean Wood	142	16.6%	−8.3
Liberal Democrats	John Winder	53	6.2%	+6.2
Turnout			43.2%	
Conservative hold		Swing	5.2	

Knebworth ward
Party	Candidate	Votes	%	±%
Conservative	F. Robin Wordsworth*	861	72.2%	−2.4
Liberal Democrats	Michael Stiff	154	12.9%	−11.5
Labour	Natasha Hetherington	135	11.3%	−17.3
Green	Stuart Madgin	43	3.6%	+3.6
Turnout			29.7%	
Conservative hold		Swing	4.5	

Letchworth East ward
Party	Candidate	Votes	%	±%
Labour	Lorna Kercher*	747	49.4%	−5.1
Conservative	Elizabeth Allen	540	35.7%	+4.9
Liberal Democrats	Martin Gammell	225	14.9%	−1.6
Turnout			28.6%	
Labour hold		Swing	-5	

Letchworth Grange ward
Party	Candidate	Votes	%	±%
Labour	David Morris*	728	50.6%	−14.1
Conservative	George Reith	538	37.4%	+10.3
Liberal Democrats	Marion Minards-Gammell	172	12%	−2.1
Turnout			28.0%	
Labour hold		Swing	-12.2	

Letchworth South East ward
Party	Candidate	Votes	%	±%
Conservative	Carole McNelliey	744	45.5%	+9.8
Labour	Jean Andrews*	596	36.5%	−10.3
Liberal Democrats	Murray Turner	295	18%	−3.3
Turnout			31.6%	
Conservative gain from Labour		Swing	10.1	

Letchworth South West ward
Party	Candidate	Votes	%	±%
Conservative	Terry Hone	1,269	47.3%	−1.0
Liberal Democrats	Andrew Ircha	1222	45.5%	+2.5
Labour	Jacqueline Hartley	193	7.2%	−8.6
Turnout			47.8%	
Conservative gain from Liberal Democrats		Swing	-1.7	

Letchworth Wilbury ward
Party	Candidate	Votes	%	±%
Labour	Gary Grindal*	517	55.9%	−8.0
Conservative	Jessica Thomson	296	32%	+5.5
Liberal Democrats	Paul Booton	112	12.1%	+1.0
Turnout			23.1%	
Labour hold		Swing	-6.8	

Royston Heath ward
Party	Candidate	Votes	%	±%
Conservative	Rod Kennedy*	641	52.7%	+0.9
Labour	Robin King	304	25%	−0.6
Liberal Democrats	John Ledden	271	22.3%	−3.8
Turnout			31.4%	
Conservative hold		Swing	+0.7	

Royston Meridian ward
Party	Candidate	Votes	%	±%
Conservative	F. John Smith*	587	54.1%	+4.6
Labour	Dorothy Fryer	284	26.2%	−3.6
Liberal Democrats	Patricia Baxter	215	19.8%	−4.1
Turnout			32.6%	
Conservative hold		Swing	4.1	

Royston Palace ward
Party	Candidate	Votes	%	±%
Conservative	Martin Beaver*	486	48%	+10.4
Labour	Joan Herbert	308	30.4%	−10.0
Liberal Democrats	Caroline Coates	219	26.7%	−2.0
Turnout			26.7%	
Conservative hold		Swing	10.2	

== Changes 2000–2002 ==
Codicote by-election, 22 February 2001
Party	Candidate	Votes	%	±%
Labour	Karen Omer (Karry Omer)	632	59.8	+36.9
Conservative	Peter Ivory	343	32.5	−33.7
Liberal Democrats	Paul Clark	82	7.8	−3.1
Majority		289	27.3	
Turnout		1,057	52.3	
Labour gain from Conservative		Swing		

This by-election was triggered by the resignation of Conservative councillor Luke La Plain.

Hitchin Highbury by-election, 7 June 2001
Party	Candidate	Votes	%	±%
Liberal Democrats	Paul Clark	2,102	57.7	+16.2
Conservative	Raymond Shakespeare-Smith	1,542	42.3	−5.1
Majority		560	15.4	
Turnout		3,644		
Liberal Democrats gain from Conservative		Swing		

This by-election was triggered by the resignation of Conservative councillor Paul Dee.

Letchworth Grange By-Election 7 June 2001
Party	Candidate	Votes	%	±%
Labour	Jon Newham	1,725	54.8	+4.2
Conservative		911	29.0	−8.5
Liberal Democrats		510	16.2	+4.3
Majority		814	25.8	
Turnout		3,146		
Labour hold		Swing		

This by-election was triggered by the resignation of Labour councillor David Morris.
