= 2006 North Hertfordshire District Council election =

Council election in England

← 2004	4 May 2006	2007 →

18 of 49 seats on North Hertfordshire District Council 25 seats needed for a majority
	First party	Second party	Third party
	Con	Lab	LD
Leader	F. John Smith	David Kearns	Steve Jarvis
Party	Conservative	Labour	Liberal Democrats
Seats before	28	14	7
Seats after	33	9	7
Seat change	▲5	▼5	Steady
- Results of the 2006 North Hertfordshire District Council election
Leader before election
F. John Smith
Conservative
Leader after election
F. John Smith
Conservative

The 2006 North Hertfordshire District Council election was held on 4 May 2006, at the same time as other local elections across England. 18 of the 49 seats on North Hertfordshire District Council were up for election, being the usual third of the council plus a by-election in Knebworth ward. The Conservatives made a net increase of five seats on the council, increasing their majority.

== Overall results ==
The overall results were as follows:

2006 North Hertfordshire District Council election
Party	This election			Full council			This election		
Party	Seats	Net	Seats %	Other	Total	Total %	Votes	Votes %	+/−
Conservative	14	▲5	77.8	19	33	67.3	15,291	46.4	+5.0
Liberal Democrats	2	Steady	11.1	5	7	14.3	6,929	23.3	-3.6
Labour	2	▼5	11.1	4	9	18.4	5,727	19.3	-4.6
Green	0	Steady	0.0	0	0	0.0	1,788	6.0	+3.2

== Ward results ==
The results for each ward were as follows. An asterisk (*) indicates a sitting councillor standing for re-election.

Baldock Town ward
Party	Candidate	Votes	%	±%
Conservative	Michael Douglas Robert MacKenzie Muir*	1,370	65.0	+3.2
Labour	Paul David Burgin	331	15.7	−4.9
Liberal Democrats	John Stephen White	257	12.2	−5.4
Green	George Howe	149	7.1	+7.1
Turnout			35.8	
Registered electors		5,913		
Conservative hold		Swing	+4.1	

Codicote ward
Party	Candidate	Votes	%	±%
Conservative	Thomas Henry Brindley	744	75.5	+31.2
Labour	Roger Aubrey Wood	122	12.4	−43.3
Liberal Democrats	John Winder	119	12.1	+12.1
Turnout			47.3	
Registered electors		2,096		
Conservative gain from Labour		Swing	+37.3	

Hitchin Bearton ward
Party	Candidate	Votes	%	±%
Labour	Deepak Sangha*	600	31.5	−6.9
Conservative	Pradeep Sharma (Paul Sharma)	514	27.0	−2.5
Liberal Democrats	Andrew Ircha	408	21.4	+3.6
Green	Sarah Elaine Pond	385	20.2	+5.7
Turnout			36.0	
Registered electors		5,333		
Labour hold		Swing	-2.2	

Hitchin Highbury ward
Party	Candidate	Votes	%	±%
Liberal Democrats	Paul Clark*	1,390	53.6	+10.0
Conservative	Malcolm George Bracken	1,028	39.7	−6.2
Labour	Mark Francis Crawley	174	6.7	+0.3
Turnout			46.2	
Registered electors		5,628		
Liberal Democrats hold		Swing	+8.1	

Hitchin Oughton ward
Party	Candidate	Votes	%	±%
Labour	David Edward Billing*	511	43.7	−4.3
Conservative	Alan John Millard	400	34.2	+3.0
Liberal Democrats	Ronald Alexander Clark	151	12.9	−7.8
Green	Tony Denis Ware	107	9.2	+9.2
Turnout			32.0	
Registered electors		3,671		
Labour hold		Swing	-3.7	

Hitchin Priory ward
Party	Candidate	Votes	%	±%
Conservative	Allison Gertrude Ashley*	1,112	63.3	+3.1
Liberal Democrats	Michael John Lott	309	17.6	−8.1
Green	Susan Elizabeth Dye	192	10.9	+10.9
Labour	Douglas James McCall	145	8.2	−5.9
Turnout			43.4	
Registered electors		4,076		
Conservative hold		Swing	+5.6	

Hitchin Walsworth ward
Party	Candidate	Votes	%	±%
Conservative	Bernard Frank James Lovewell	1,027	46.6	+5.5
Labour	Ryan Ottis Johnson	703	31.9	−3.5
Liberal Democrats	David Shirley	239	10.8	−3.5
Green	Giles Colin Woodruff	234	10.6	+1.6
Turnout			40.2	
Registered electors		5,494		
Conservative gain from Labour		Swing	+4.5	

Kimpton ward
Party	Candidate	Votes	%	±%
Conservative	John Cyril Bishop	523	70.5	−2.4
Liberal Democrats	Richard Oliver Canning	125	16.8	+8.0
Green	David Geoffrey Ashton	94	12.7	+7.6
Turnout			42.5	
Registered electors		1,754		
Conservative hold		Swing	-5.2	

Knebworth ward
Party	Candidate	Votes	%	±%
Conservative	Jane Elizabeth Gray	1,414	63.7	+11.9
Conservative	Alan Bardett*	1,334		
Liberal Democrats	Debra Patricia Wilkins	411	18.5	−7.8
Green	William Nicholas Berrington	206	9.3	−1.5
Labour	Clare Helen Billing	189	8.5	−2.6
Labour	Alan James Mitchell	125		
Turnout			39.9	
Registered electors		3,991		
Conservative hold		Swing	+9.9	
Conservative hold		Swing		

The by-election in Knebworth ward was triggered by the resignation of Conservative councillor Robin Wordsworth.

Letchworth East ward
Party	Candidate	Votes	%	±%
Conservative	Diane Margaret Ivy Proudlove	755	40.6	+3.6
Labour	Anthony Robert Hartley*	625	33.6	−5.3
Liberal Democrats	Rebecca Carole Winder	301	16.2	−7.9
Green	Eric Blakeley	180	9.7	+9.7
Turnout			35.0	
Registered electors		5,328		
Conservative gain from Labour		Swing	+4.5	

Letchworth Grange ward
Party	Candidate	Votes	%	±%
Conservative	Monica Madeline Bloxham	793	43.7	+4.1
Labour	Peter Anthony Mardell*	668	36.8	−1.1
Liberal Democrats	Martin Geoffrey Penny	353	19.5	−2.9
Turnout			36.0	
Registered electors		5,073		
Conservative gain from Labour		Swing	+2.6	

Letchworth South East ward
Party	Candidate	Votes	%	±%
Conservative	David Charles Levett	951	50.2	+4.2
Labour	Anthony Dennis Eden (Tony Eden)	523	27.6	−3.6
Liberal Democrats	Julia Winter	419	22.1	−0.6
Turnout			36.4	
Registered electors		5,221		
Conservative hold		Swing	+3.9	

Letchworth South West ward
Party	Candidate	Votes	%	±%
Conservative	Melissa Jane Davey	1,471	58.1	+8.6
Liberal Democrats	Alison Elaine Kingman*	832	32.8	−8.6
Labour	Jacqueline Brigitte Hartley	230	9.1	−0.1
Turnout			44.9	
Registered electors		5,682		
Conservative gain from Liberal Democrats		Swing	+8.6	

Letchworth Wilbury ward
Party	Candidate	Votes	%	±%
Conservative	Elliot William Needham	511	42.5	+6.2
Labour	Ian Mantle*	413	34.3	−7.9
Liberal Democrats	John Paul Winder	160	13.3	−8.1
Green	Heidi Shona Mollart-Griffin	119	9.9	+9.9
Turnout			29.3	
Registered electors		4,123		
Conservative gain from Labour		Swing	+7.1	

Royston Heath ward
Party	Candidate	Votes	%	±%
Conservative	Fiona Ronan Greenwood Hill*	1,013	62.5	+7.3
Liberal Democrats	David May	420	25.9	−1.2
Labour	Vaughan West	187	11.5	−6.1
Turnout			38.8	
Registered electors		4,194		
Conservative hold		Swing	+4.3	

Royston Meridian ward
Party	Candidate	Votes	%	±%
Conservative	Anthony Frederick Hunter* (Tony Hunter)	992	62.7	+6.1
Liberal Democrats	Nanya Esther Lilley	310	19.6	−7.7
Labour	Robin Anthony King	159	10.0	−6.1
Green	Karen Harmel	122	7.7	+7.7
Turnout			37.8	
Registered electors		4,201		
Conservative hold		Swing	+6.9	

Royston Palace ward
Party	Candidate	Votes	%	±%
Liberal Democrats	Elizabeth Mary Beardwell	725	46.9	+2.4
Conservative	William Marr Davidson* (Bill Davidson)	673	43.6	+6.0
Labour	Kenneth Garland	147	9.5	−8.5
Turnout			39.9	
Registered electors		3,907		
Liberal Democrats gain from Conservative		Swing	-1.8	
