= 2007 North Hertfordshire District Council election =

Council election in England

| ← 2006 | 3 May 2007 | 2008 → |

All 49 seats on North Hertfordshire District Council 25 seats needed for a majority
| | First party | Second party | Third party |
|---|---|---|---|
| | Con | Lab | LD |
| Leader | F. John Smith | David Kearns | Steve Jarvis |
| Party | Conservative | Labour | Liberal Democrats |
| Seats before | 33 | 9 | 7 |
| Seats after | 30 | 10 | 9 |
| Seat change | ▼3 | ▲1 | ▲2 |
| Popular vote | 18,441 | 7,238 | 10,094 |
| Percentage | 47.0% | 18.5% | 25.7% |
- Results of the 2007 North Hertfordshire District Council election
Leader before election
F. John Smith
Conservative
Leader after election
F. John Smith
Conservative

The 2007 North Hertfordshire District Council election was held on 3 May 2007, at the same time as other local elections across England and Scotland. All 49 seats on North Hertfordshire District Council were up for election following changes to ward boundaries. Labour and the Liberal Democrats both increased their number of seats, but the Conservatives retained their majority on the council. The Conservative leader, F. John Smith, remained leader of the council after the election.

== Overall results ==
The overall results were as follows:

North Hertfordshire District Council Election, 2007
| Party | Seats | Gains | Losses | Net gain/loss | Seats % | Votes % | Votes | +/− |
|---|---|---|---|---|---|---|---|---|
| Conservative | 30 | | | | 61.2 | 47.0 | 18,441 | |
| Liberal Democrats | 9 | | | | 18.4 | 25.7 | 10,094 | |
| Labour | 10 | | | | 20.4 | 18.5 | 7,238 | |
| Green | 0 | | | | 0.0 | 7.4 | 2,906 | |
| UKIP | 0 | | | | 0.0 | 0.9 | 350 | |
| Independent | 0 | | | | 0.0 | 0.5 | 183 | |

== Ward results ==
The main changes to the previous ward structure were:

- Graveley and Wymondley ward was renamed Chesfield and increased from having one councillor to two.
- Letchworth East ward had its number of councillors reduced from three to two.
- The three separate single-councillor wards of Offa, Hoo and Hitchwood were combined into a three-councillor ward called Hitchwood, Offa and Hoo.

The results for each ward were as follows. An asterisk (*) indicates a sitting councillor standing for re-election.

Arbury ward
| Party | Candidate | Votes | % | ±% |
|---|---|---|---|---|
| Conservative | Andrew Dempster Young* | 776 | 62.0% | |
| Liberal Democrats | Ian Simpson | 461 | 36.8% | |
| Turnout | | 1,252 | 58.8% | |

Baldock East ward
| Party | Candidate | Votes | % | ±% |
|---|---|---|---|---|
| Liberal Democrats | Marilyn Roberta Kirkland* | 542 | 53.6% | |
| Conservative | Les Wisher | 466 | 46.1% | |
| Turnout | | 1,011 | 46.2% | |

Baldock Town ward
| Party | Candidate | Votes | % | ±% |
|---|---|---|---|---|
| Conservative | Michael Douglas Robert Mackenzie Muir* | 1,161 | 62.2% | |
| Conservative | Ian Jeremy Knighton* | 1,094 | 58.6% | |
| Conservative | Michael Edwin Weeks* | 994 | 53.3% | |
| Liberal Democrats | Sylvia Ann Gallager | 410 | 22.0% | |
| Liberal Democrats | Marcus Keighley | 389 | 20.8% | |
| Labour | Peter Anthony Mardell | 373 | 20.0% | |
| Liberal Democrats | Robert Alan Young | 367 | 19.7% | |
| Turnout | | 1,866 | 34.2% | |

Cadwell ward
| Party | Candidate | Votes | % | ±% |
|---|---|---|---|---|
| Conservative | Tricia Gibbs* | 504 | 67.5% | |
| Liberal Democrats | Richard Oliver Canning | 156 | 20.9% | |
| Labour | Austin John Denyer Smith | 87 | 11.6% | |
| Turnout | | 747 | 42.2% | |

Chesfield ward
| Party | Candidate | Votes | % | ±% |
|---|---|---|---|---|
| Liberal Democrats | Sal Jarvis* | 803 | 59.6% | |
| Liberal Democrats | Lee Downie | 757 | 56.2% | |
| Conservative | Karen Harding | 529 | 39.2% | |
| Turnout | | 1,348 | 32.7% | |

Codicote ward
| Party | Candidate | Votes | % | ±% |
|---|---|---|---|---|
| Conservative | Tom Brindley* | 504 | 58.3% | |
| Independent | John Roy McGregor | 183 | 21.2% | |
| Labour | Jan Burnell | 118 | 13.7% | |
| Green | Harold Bland | 57 | 6.6% | |
| Turnout | | 864 | 40.8% | |

Ermine ward
| Party | Candidate | Votes | % | ±% |
|---|---|---|---|---|
| Conservative | Howard Maycroft Marshall* | 689 | 77.9% | |
| Liberal Democrats | Joan Ellen Inwood | 190 | 21.5% | |
| Turnout | | 884 | 44.2% | |

Hitchin Bearton ward
| Party | Candidate | Votes | % | ±% |
|---|---|---|---|---|
| Labour | Judi Billing* | 922 | 43.8% | |
| Labour | Martin Stears* | 793 | 37.7% | |
| Labour | Deepak Singh Sangha* | 758 | 36.0% | |
| Conservative | Pat Cherry | 561 | 26.6% | |
| Conservative | Charles Spencer Bunker | 523 | 24.8% | |
| Conservative | Tony Strong | 456 | 21.7% | |
| Green | George Howe | 399 | 18.9% | |
| Green | Susan Dye | 365 | 17.3% | |
| Green | Ashley Walker | 331 | 15.7% | |
| Liberal Democrats | Linda Maynard | 285 | 13.5% | |
| Liberal Democrats | Heather Macmillan | 251 | 11.9% | |
| Liberal Democrats | Andrew Ircha | 226 | 10.7% | |
| Turnout | | 2,106 | 36.1% | |

Hitchin Highbury ward
| Party | Candidate | Votes | % | ±% |
|---|---|---|---|---|
| Liberal Democrats | Paul Clark* | 1,423 | 55.6% | |
| Liberal Democrats | Lawrence Oliver* | 1,260 | 49.2% | |
| Liberal Democrats | Clare Body | 1,250 | 48.8% | |
| Conservative | Sarah Jane Wren* | 1,026 | 40.1% | |
| Conservative | Mark Hanson | 895 | 34.9% | |
| Green | Bob Mardon | 265 | 10.3% | |
| Labour | Mark Francis Crawley | 178 | 7.0% | |
| Green | Alan Brookman | 174 | 6.8% | |
| Green | Tabitha Middleton | 142 | 5.5% | |
| Turnout | | 2,561 | 45.2% | |

Hitchin Oughton ward
| Party | Candidate | Votes | % | ±% |
|---|---|---|---|---|
| Labour | David Edward Billing* | 643 | 53.5% | |
| Labour | Joan Irene Kirby* | 636 | 53.0% | |
| Conservative | Penny Brook | 326 | 27.1% | |
| Conservative | Stephen Parker | 322 | 26.8% | |
| Liberal Democrats | Ronald Alexander Clark | 124 | 10.3% | |
| Green | Sarah Pond | 119 | 9.9% | |
| Green | Heather Summers | 89 | 7.4% | |
| Turnout | | 1,201 | 32.1% | |

Hitchin Priory ward
| Party | Candidate | Votes | % | ±% |
|---|---|---|---|---|
| Conservative | Allison Gertrude Ashley* | 956 | 62.5% | |
| Conservative | Richard Arthur Charles Thake* | 895 | 58.5% | |
| Liberal Democrats | Michael John Lott | 309 | 20.2% | |
| Green | Chris Honey | 204 | 13.3% | |
| Green | Teresa Caroline Loveday | 193 | 12.6% | |
| Liberal Democrats | John Stephen White | 177 | 11.6% | |
| Labour | Min Birdsey | 149 | 9.7% | |
| Turnout | | 1,530 | 42.9% | |

Hitchin Walsworth ward
| Party | Candidate | Votes | % | ±% |
|---|---|---|---|---|
| Conservative | Bernard Frank James Lovewell* | 984 | 43.3% | |
| Conservative | Alan John Millard | 963 | 42.4% | |
| Conservative | Ray Shakespeare-Smith* | 861 | 37.9% | |
| Labour | Ryan Ottis Johnson | 768 | 33.8% | |
| Labour | Derek Nigel Sheard* | 724 | 31.9% | |
| Green | Giles Colin Woodruff | 664 | 29.2% | |
| Labour | Roger Aubrey Wood | 555 | 24.4% | |
| Liberal Democrats | Barbara Clark | 374 | 16.5% | |
| Liberal Democrats | David Shirley | 347 | 15.3% | |
| Turnout | | 2,272 | 38.0% | |

Hitchwood, Offa and Hoo ward
| Party | Candidate | Votes | % | ±% |
|---|---|---|---|---|
| Conservative | David John Barnard* | 1,603 | 66.4% | |
| Conservative | David Miller* | 1,516 | 62.8% | |
| Conservative | Claire Patricia Annette Strong* | 1,512 | 62.6% | |
| Liberal Democrats | Peter Donald Johnson | 503 | 20.8% | |
| Green | David Ashton | 486 | 20.1% | |
| Labour | Clare Helen Billing | 391 | 16.2% | |
| Turnout | | 2,415 | 43.4% | |

Kimpton ward
| Party | Candidate | Votes | % | ±% |
|---|---|---|---|---|
| Conservative | John Cyril Bishop* | 512 | 72.7% | |
| Liberal Democrats | Oliver Simon Jarvis | 125 | 17.8% | |
| Labour | Jean Elizabeth Ann Wood | 65 | 9.2% | |
| Turnout | | 704 | 39.8% | |

Knebworth ward
| Party | Candidate | Votes | % | ±% |
|---|---|---|---|---|
| Conservative | Jane Elizabeth Gray* | 987 | 66.1% | |
| Conservative | Alan Bardett* | 943 | 63.1% | |
| Liberal Democrats | Debra Wilkins | 296 | 19.8% | |
| Labour | John Brian Burnell | 232 | 15.5% | |
| Labour | Harry Painter | 213 | 14.3% | |
| Green | William Berrington | 183 | 12.2% | |
| Turnout | | 1,494 | 37.1% | |

Letchworth East ward
| Party | Candidate | Votes | % | ±% |
|---|---|---|---|---|
| Labour | Lorna Rose Kercher* | 549 | 43.9% | |
| Labour | Arthur Jarman | 503 | 40.2% | |
| Conservative | Michael Paterson* | 456 | 36.5% | |
| Conservative | Diane Margaret Ivy Proudlove* | 440 | 35.2% | |
| Liberal Democrats | Rebecca Carole Winder | 202 | 16.2% | |
| Liberal Democrats | Mertsi Merentytto Fisher | 187 | 15.0% | |
| Turnout | | 1,250 | 32.2% | |

Letchworth Grange ward
| Party | Candidate | Votes | % | ±% |
|---|---|---|---|---|
| Labour | David Peter Kearns* | 912 | 43.5% | |
| Conservative | Simon Bloxham* | 906 | 43.2% | |
| Conservative | Allison Dear | 869 | 41.4% | |
| Conservative | Monica Bloxham* | 852 | 40.6% | |
| Labour | Jean Andrews | 843 | 40.2% | |
| Labour | Tony Eden | 840 | 40.1% | |
| Liberal Democrats | Julie Louise Inwood | 335 | 16.0% | |
| Turnout | | 2,097 | 36.1% | |

Letchworth South East ward
| Party | Candidate | Votes | % | ±% |
|---|---|---|---|---|
| Conservative | Julian Michael Cunningham* | 928 | 46.8% | |
| Conservative | John Leo Dobson Booth | 861 | 43.4% | |
| Conservative | David Charles Levett* | 841 | 42.4% | |
| Labour | Nicholas Frederick Henry Kissen | 451 | 22.7% | |
| Labour | Kevin Douglas Lake | 433 | 21.8% | |
| Liberal Democrats | Alison Elaine Kingman | 430 | 21.7% | |
| Liberal Democrats | Julia Winter | 422 | 21.3% | |
| Liberal Democrats | John Winder | 374 | 18.9% | |
| UKIP | John Finbarr Barry | 350 | 17.6% | |
| Turnout | | 1,984 | 34.3% | |

Letchworth South West ward
| Party | Candidate | Votes | % | ±% |
|---|---|---|---|---|
| Conservative | Lynda Needham* | 1,532 | 60.7% | |
| Conservative | Melissa Jane Davey* | 1,426 | 56.5% | |
| Conservative | Terry Hone* | 1,407 | 55.7% | |
| Liberal Democrats | John Paul Winder | 593 | 23.5% | |
| Liberal Democrats | Clem Jonathan Harcourt | 541 | 21.4% | |
| Liberal Democrats | Martin Geoffrey Penny | 536 | 21.2% | |
| Labour | Headley Valentine Parkins | 279 | 11.1% | |
| Green | Jon Hart | 263 | 10.4% | |
| Green | Eric Blakeley | 252 | 10.0% | |
| Green | Heidi Mollart-Griffin | 183 | 7.3% | |
| Turnout | | 2,524 | 42.1% | |

Letchworth Wilbury ward
| Party | Candidate | Votes | % | ±% |
|---|---|---|---|---|
| Labour | Gary Thomas Grindal* | 595 | 45.8% | |
| Labour | Ian Mantle | 592 | 45.6% | |
| Conservative | Elliot William Needham* | 546 | 42.1% | |
| Conservative | Pradeep Kumar Sharma | 431 | 33.2% | |
| Liberal Democrats | Ursula Winder | 307 | 23.7% | |
| Turnout | | 1,298 | 32.2% | |

Royston Heath ward
| Party | Candidate | Votes | % | ±% |
|---|---|---|---|---|
| Conservative | Peter Colin Weston Burt* | 780 | 52.1% | |
| Conservative | Fiona Ronan Hill* | 778 | 52.0% | |
| Liberal Democrats | Caroline Elizabeth Coates | 536 | 35.8% | |
| Liberal Democrats | Nanya Esther Lilley | 445 | 29.7% | |
| Labour | Robin Anthony King | 194 | 13.0% | |
| Turnout | | 1,496 | 36.2% | |

Royston Meridian ward
| Party | Candidate | Votes | % | ±% |
|---|---|---|---|---|
| Conservative | Tony Hunter* | 842 | 57.9% | |
| Conservative | Francis John Smith* | 785 | 54.0% | |
| Liberal Democrats | John Raymond Ledden | 333 | 22.9% | |
| Liberal Democrats | David Robert May | 312 | 21.5% | |
| Green | Karen Harmel | 266 | 18.3% | |
| Labour | Vaughan West | 183 | 12.6% | |
| Turnout | | 1,454 | 35.6% | |

Royston Palace ward
| Party | Candidate | Votes | % | ±% |
|---|---|---|---|---|
| Liberal Democrats | Liz Beardwell* | 753 | 49.7% | |
| Liberal Democrats | Robert Edward Inwood* | 710 | 46.9% | |
| Conservative | Bill Davidson | 648 | 42.8% | |
| Conservative | Graham William Palmer | 607 | 40.1% | |
| Labour | Ken Garland | 149 | 9.8% | |
| Turnout | | 1,515 | 36.7% | |

Weston and Sandon ward
| Party | Candidate | Votes | % | ±% |
|---|---|---|---|---|
| Liberal Democrats | Steve Jarvis* | 604 | 72.9% | |
| Conservative | Catherine Elaine Rowell | 219 | 26.4% | |
| Turnout | | 828 | 51.6% | |
