= 2003 North Hertfordshire District Council election =

Council election in England

← 2002	1 May 2003	2004 →

16 of 49 seats on North Hertfordshire District Council 25 seats needed for a majority
	First party	Second party	Third party
	Con	Lab	LD
Leader	F. John Smith	David Kearns	Steve Jarvis
Party	Conservative	Labour	Liberal Democrats
Seats before	28	17	4
Seats after	27	16	6
Seat change	▼1	▼1	▲2
- Results of the 2003 North Hertfordshire District Council election
Leader before election
F. John Smith
Conservative
Leader after election
F. John Smith
Conservative

The 2003 North Hertfordshire District Council election was held on 1 May 2003, at the same time as other local elections across England and Scotland. 16 of the 49 seats on North Hertfordshire District Council were up for election, being the usual third of the council.

== Overall results ==
The overall results were as follows:

2003 North Hertfordshire District Council election
Party	This election			Full council			This election		
Party	Seats	Net	Seats %	Other	Total	Total %	Votes	Votes %	+/−
Conservative	9	▼1	56.3	18	27	55.1	9,737	46.0	+3.0
Liberal Democrats	4	▲2	25.0	2	6	12.2	6,389	30.2	+8.4
Labour	3	▼1	18.8	13	16	32.7	4,663	22.0	-9.0
Green	0	Steady	0.0	0	0	0.0	363	1.7	-0.5

== Ward results ==
The results for each ward were as follows. An asterisk (*) indicates a sitting councillor standing for re-election. A double dagger (‡) indicates a sitting councillor contesting a different ward.

Arbury ward
Party	Candidate	Votes	%	±%
Conservative	Andrew Dempster Young*	744	61.5	−4.0
Liberal Democrats	Alan Geoffrey Marshall	466	38.5	+16.1
Turnout			59.7	
Registered electors		2,030		
Conservative hold		Swing	-10.1	

Baldock East ward
Party	Candidate	Votes	%	±%
Liberal Democrats	Geoffrey Cecil Hollands	363	53	+31.6
Conservative	Leslie Wilsher	322	47	−9.4
Turnout			38.8	
Registered electors		1,775		
Liberal Democrats gain from Conservative		Swing	+20.5	

Baldock Town ward
Party	Candidate	Votes	%	±%
Conservative	Michael Edwin Weeks ‡	982	57.5	−7.9
Labour	Paul David Burgin	465	27.2	+3.8
Liberal Democrats	John Stephen White	260	15.2	+4.1
Turnout			29.9	
Registered electors		5,728		
Conservative hold		Swing	-5.9	

Cadwell ward
Party	Candidate	Votes	%	±%
Conservative	Patricia Winifred Gibbs* (Tricia Gibbs)	383	57.1	+6.1
Liberal Democrats	Richard Oliver Canning	142	21.2	+8.4
Labour	Tarnjeet Kaur Rehal	117	17.4	−18.6
Green	George Winston Howe	29	4.3	+4.3
Turnout			37.4	
Registered electors		1,799		
Conservative hold		Swing	-1.2	

Ermine ward
Party	Candidate	Votes	%	±%
Conservative	Howard Maycroft Marshall*	675	65.5	+2.2
Liberal Democrats	Ian Simpson	319	30.9	+7.2
Labour	Kenneth Garland	37	3.6	−9.4
Turnout			52.4	
Registered electors		1,972		
Conservative hold		Swing	-2.5	

Graveley and Wymondley ward
Party	Candidate	Votes	%	±%
Liberal Democrats	Sally Margaret Jarvis*	595	68.2	+7.6
Conservative	Juli Marie Dear	224	25.7	−5.0
Labour	Philip Anthony Vale	54	6.2	−2.6
Turnout			29.9	
Registered electors		2,930		
Liberal Democrats hold		Swing	+6.3	

Hitchin Bearton ward
Party	Candidate	Votes	%	±%
Labour	Judi Billing*	782	50.1	−0.3
Conservative	Kevin David Banks	421	27	−3.1
Liberal Democrats	Ingeborg Sutcliffe	232	14.9	+3.8
Green	Stuart Wanstall Madgin	127	8.1	−0.3
Turnout			29.3	
Registered electors		5,366		
Labour hold		Swing	+1.4	

Hitchin Highbury ward
Party	Candidate	Votes	%	±%
Liberal Democrats	Lawrence William Oliver	1,123	52.1	−11.3
Conservative	David Miller	892	41.4	+9.2
Labour	Kusminder Singh Sahasi	141	6.5	+6.5
Turnout			39.7	
Registered electors		5,443		
Liberal Democrats gain from Conservative		Swing	-10.3	

Hitchin Walsworth ward
Party	Candidate	Votes	%	±%
Labour	Derek Nigel Sheard	679	42.5	−4.3
Conservative	Raymond Lawrence Shakespeare-Smith	583	36.5	−3.2
Liberal Democrats	David Shirley	214	13.4	+4.1
Green	Evelyn Grace Howe	123	7.7	+3.4
Turnout			29.5	
Registered electors		5,435		
Labour gain from Conservative		Swing	-0.6	

Hoo ward
Party	Candidate	Votes	%	±%
Conservative	David John Barnard*	587	68.7	+12.8
Labour	Roger Aubrey Wood	208	24.3	−19.9
Liberal Democrats	Andrew Ircha	60	7	+7.0
Turnout			47.5	
Registered electors		1,807		
Conservative hold		Swing	+16.4	

Letchworth East ward
Party	Candidate	Votes	%	±%
Conservative	Michael Paterson	566	39.3	+13.2
Labour	Arthur Jarman*	519	36	−11.5
Liberal Democrats	Martin Gammell	272	18.9	+1.2
Green	Eric Morris Blakeley	84	5.8	−2.9
Turnout			27.2	
Registered electors		5,299		
Conservative gain from Labour		Swing	+12.4	

Letchworth Grange ward
Party	Candidate	Votes	%	±%
Labour	David Peter Kearns*	683	43.6	−15.6
Conservative	Simon Nicholas Bloxham	626	39.9	+11.7
Liberal Democrats	Nicholas Butcher	259	16.5	+4.0
Turnout			30.7	
Registered electors		5,111		
Labour hold		Swing	-13.7	

Letchworth South East ward
Party	Candidate	Votes	%	±%
Conservative	Julian Michael Cunningham	826	46.6	+2.1
Labour	John Henry Davies	652	36.8	+0.8
Liberal Democrats	John Winder	295	16.6	−2.8
Turnout			34.4	
Registered electors		5,162		
Conservative gain from Labour		Swing	+0.7	

Letchworth South West ward
Party	Candidate	Votes	%	±%
Conservative	Lynda Ann Needham*	1,246	49.4	+5.9
Liberal Democrats	John Paul Winder	1,063	42.2	−5.7
Labour	Philip Edward Ross	211	8.4	−0.3
Turnout			44.6	
Registered electors		5,666		
Conservative hold		Swing	+5.8	

Offa ward
Party	Candidate	Votes	%	±%
Conservative	Claire Patricia Annette Strong*	438	63.5	+4.0
Liberal Democrats	Peter Donald Johnson	160	23.2	+4.5
Labour	Rob Whatson	92	13.3	−8.6
Turnout			42.3	
Registered electors		1,629		
Conservative hold		Swing	-0.3	

Weston and Sandon ward
Party	Candidate	Votes	%	±%
Liberal Democrats	Stephen Kenneth Jarvis*	566	69.8	+5.3
Conservative	Margaret Mary Darby	222	27.4	+27.4
Labour	David Alexander Stears	23	2.8	+0.4
Turnout			52.3	
Registered electors		1,553		
Liberal Democrats hold		Swing	-11.1	
