= 2002 North Hertfordshire District Council election =

Council election in England

| ← 2000 | 2 May 2002 | 2003 → |

18 of 49 seats on North Hertfordshire District Council 25 seats needed for a majority
| | First party | Second party | Third party |
|---|---|---|---|
| | Con | Lab | LD |
| Leader | F. John Smith | David Kearns | Steve Jarvis |
| Party | Conservative | Labour | Liberal Democrats |
| Seats before | 27 | 19 | 3 |
| Seats after | 28 | 17 | 4 |
| Seat change | ▲1 | ▼2 | ▲1 |
- Results of the 2002 North Hertfordshire District Council election
Leader before election
F. John Smith
Conservative
Leader after election
F. John Smith
Conservative

The 2002 North Hertfordshire District Council election was held on 2 May 2002, at the same time as other local elections across England. 18 of the 49 seats on North Hertfordshire District Council were up for election, being the usual third of the council plus a by-election in Royston Heath ward.

== Ward results ==
The results for each ward were as follows. An asterisk(*) indicates a sitting councillor standing for re-election.

Baldock Town ward
| Party | Candidate | Votes | % | ±% |
|---|---|---|---|---|
| Conservative | Michael Muir* | 1,357 | 65.4 | +8.3 |
| Labour | Rodney Leete | 487 | 23.5 | −11.1 |
| Liberal Democrats | Geoffrey Hollands | 230 | 11.1 | +2.7 |
| Turnout | | | 36.8 | |
| Registered electors | | 5,640 | | |
| Conservative hold | | Swing | +9.7 | |

Codicote ward
| Party | Candidate | Votes | % | ±% |
|---|---|---|---|---|
| Labour | Karen Omer* (Karry Omer) | 600 | 55.7 | −4.1 |
| Conservative | Alan Bardett | 478 | 44.3 | +11.8 |
| Turnout | | | 53.3 | |
| Registered electors | | 2,027 | | |
| Labour hold | | Swing | -8.0 | |

Hitchin Bearton ward
| Party | Candidate | Votes | % | ±% |
|---|---|---|---|---|
| Labour | Peter Terry | 849 | 50.4 | −0.8 |
| Conservative | Pat Cherry | 507 | 30.1 | −1.2 |
| Liberal Democrats | Keith Catchpole | 187 | 11.1 | +3.9 |
| Green | Nigel Howitt | 142 | 8.4 | +4.9 |
| Turnout | | | 31.8 | |
| Registered electors | | 5,326 | | |
| Labour hold | | Swing | +0.2 | |

Hitchin Highbury ward
| Party | Candidate | Votes | % | ±% |
|---|---|---|---|---|
| Liberal Democrats | Paul Clark* | 1,405 | 63.4 | +5.7 |
| Conservative | Ray Shakespeare-Smith | 713 | 32.2 | −10.1 |
| Green | George Winston Howe | 98 | 4.4 | +4.4 |
| Turnout | | | 40.8 | |
| Registered electors | | 5,466 | | |
| Liberal Democrats hold | | Swing | +7.9 | |

Hitchin Oughton ward
| Party | Candidate | Votes | % | ±% |
|---|---|---|---|---|
| Labour | David Billing | 656 | 58.6 | −4.3 |
| Conservative | Tony Strong | 308 | 27.5 | −1.2 |
| Liberal Democrats | Ingeborg Sutcliffe | 156 | 13.9 | +6.5 |
| Turnout | | | 29.9 | |
| Registered electors | | 3,750 | | |
| Labour hold | | Swing | -1.6 | |

Hitchin Priory ward
| Party | Candidate | Votes | % | ±% |
|---|---|---|---|---|
| Conservative | Allison Ashley | 991 | 64.4 | −7.4 |
| Liberal Democrats | Heather MacMillan | 314 | 20.4 | +9.1 |
| Labour | Tanjeet Rehal | 234 | 15.2 | −1.7 |
| Turnout | | | 38.9 | |
| Registered electors | | 3,962 | | |
| Conservative hold | | Swing | -8.3 | |

Hitchin Walsworth ward
| Party | Candidate | Votes | % | ±% |
|---|---|---|---|---|
| Labour | Sandra Lunn* | 1,000 | 46.8 | −1.3 |
| Conservative | David Miller | 847 | 39.6 | −4.0 |
| Liberal Democrats | David Shirley | 198 | 9.3 | +1.0 |
| Green | Evelyn Howe | 92 | 4.3 | −1.4 |
| Turnout | | | 39.5 | |
| Registered electors | | 5,423 | | |
| Labour hold | | Swing | +1.4 | |

Kimpton ward
| Party | Candidate | Votes | % | ±% |
|---|---|---|---|---|
| Conservative | David Horrell* | 551 | 72.9 | −6.2 |
| Labour | Jean Wood | 100 | 13.2 | −7.7 |
| Liberal Democrats | Andrew Ircha | 67 | 8.9 | +8.9 |
| Green | David Ashton | 38 | 5.0 | +5.0 |
| Turnout | | | 44.5 | |
| Registered electors | | 1,710 | | |
| Conservative hold | | Swing | +0.7 | |

Knebworth ward
| Party | Candidate | Votes | % | ±% |
|---|---|---|---|---|
| Conservative | Jane Gray* | 826 | 61.9 | −10.3 |
| Labour | David Stears | 266 | 19.9 | +8.6 |
| Liberal Democrats | Peter Wilkins | 183 | 13.7 | +0.8 |
| Green | Stuart Madgin | 60 | 4.5 | +0.9 |
| Turnout | | | 33.8 | |
| Registered electors | | 3,955 | | |
| Conservative hold | | Swing | -9.5 | |

Letchworth East ward
| Party | Candidate | Votes | % | ±% |
|---|---|---|---|---|
| Labour | Tony Hartley* | 650 | 47.5 | −1.9 |
| Conservative | Elizabeth Allen | 356 | 26.0 | −9.7 |
| Liberal Democrats | Martin Gammell | 241 | 17.6 | +2.7 |
| Green | Eric Blakeley | 120 | 8.8 | +8.8 |
| Turnout | | | 29.3 | |
| Registered electors | | 5,292 | | |
| Labour hold | | Swing | +3.9 | |

Letchworth Grange ward
| Party | Candidate | Votes | % | ±% |
|---|---|---|---|---|
| Labour | Peter Mardell* | 920 | 59.2 | +8.6 |
| Conservative | Judith Gower | 439 | 28.2 | −9.2 |
| Liberal Democrats | Marion Minards Gammell | 195 | 12.5 | +0.5 |
| Turnout | | | 30.1 | |
| Registered electors | | 5,171 | | |
| Labour hold | | Swing | +8.9 | |

Letchworth South East ward
| Party | Candidate | Votes | % | ±% |
|---|---|---|---|---|
| Conservative | John Barry | 811 | 44.5 | −1.0 |
| Labour | Nigel Agar* | 656 | 36.0 | −0.5 |
| Liberal Democrats | John Winder | 355 | 19.5 | +1.5 |
| Turnout | | | 35.7 | |
| Registered electors | | 5,117 | | |
| Conservative gain from Labour | | Swing | -0.2 | |

Letchworth South West ward
| Party | Candidate | Votes | % | ±% |
|---|---|---|---|---|
| Liberal Democrats | Alison Kingman | 1,369 | 47.9 | +2.4 |
| Conservative | Neil Refern* | 1,244 | 43.5 | −3.8 |
| Labour | Jacqueline Hartley | 247 | 8.6 | +1.4 |
| Turnout | | | 50.7 | |
| Registered electors | | 5,653 | | |
| Liberal Democrats gain from Conservative | | Swing | +3.1 | |

Letchworth Wilbury ward
| Party | Candidate | Votes | % | ±% |
|---|---|---|---|---|
| Labour | Ian Mantle* | 578 | 54.1 | −1.8 |
| Conservative | Jessica Cook | 333 | 31.2 | −0.8 |
| Liberal Democrats | Nicholas Butcher | 157 | 14.7 | +2.6 |
| Turnout | | | 26.7 | |
| Registered electors | | 4,023 | | |
| Labour hold | | Swing | -0.5 | |

Royston Heath ward
| Party | Candidate | Votes | % | ±% |
|---|---|---|---|---|
| Conservative | Fiona Greenwood | 671 | 54.5 | +1.8 |
| Conservative | Peter Burt* | 651 | 52.9 | +0.2 |
| Labour | Robin Anthony King | 350 | 28.4 | +3.4 |
| Labour | Kenneth Garland | 322 | 26.1 | +1.1 |
| Liberal Democrats | John Ledden | 283 | 23.0 | +0.7 |
| Turnout | | | 31.6 | |
| Registered electors | | 3,897 | | |
| Conservative hold | | Swing | | |
| Conservative hold | | Swing | | |

The by-election in Royston Heath was to replace Conservative councillor Rod Kennedy.

Royston Meridian ward
| Party | Candidate | Votes | % | ±% |
|---|---|---|---|---|
| Conservative | Tony Hunter* | 611 | 53.0 | −1.1 |
| Labour | Dorothy Fryer | 309 | 26.8 | +0.6 |
| Liberal Democrats | Pat Baxter | 232 | 20.1 | +0.3 |
| Turnout | | | 31.2 | |
| Registered electors | | 3,704 | | |
| Conservative hold | | Swing | -0.8 | |

Royston Palace ward
| Party | Candidate | Votes | % | ±% |
|---|---|---|---|---|
| Conservative | William Davidson | 543 | 51.5 | +3.5 |
| Labour | Les Baker* | 512 | 48.5 | +18.1 |
| Turnout | | | 28.0 | |
| Registered electors | | 3,805 | | |
| Conservative gain from Labour | | Swing | -7.3 | |
