= 2005 Hertfordshire County Council election =

2005 UK local government election

- 5 May 2005

All 77 seats to Hertfordshire County Council 39 seats needed for a majority
	First party	Second party	Third party
Party	Conservative	Labour	Liberal Democrats
Seats won	46	16	14
Seat change	▲6	▼11	▲4
Popular vote	215,247	132,168	132,926
Percentage	42.5%	26.1%	26.3%
Swing	▲4.6%	▼7.7%	▲2.6%
- 2005 local election results in Hertfordshire
Council control before election
Conservative
Council control after election
Conservative

Hertfordshire County Council elections were held on 5 May 2005, with all 77 seats contested. The Conservative Party reinforced its hold on County Hall and only the loss of 2 seats in Dacorum Borough detracted from a strong showing across the county. It maintained a stranglehold on the Eastern part of the county, winning all of the seats in Broxbourne District and East Herts District.

The Liberal Democrats made a strong showing in Watford and St Albans District and made gains in Tring Division (Dacorum) and Chells Division (Stevenage) from Conservatives and Labour respectively.

The Labour Party were the main losers on the day, with a net loss of 11 seats and being beaten into third place in the popular vote. The Conservative Party and the Liberal Democrat Party were the main benefactors from Labour's poor performance, gaining 6 seats and 4 seats respectively. The Greens gained a single seat in Watford District (Callowland Leggatts), again at Labour's expense. Labour would find little consolation from this election suffering significant losses throughout the central and western parts of the county. Stevenage Borough remained as the only Labour stronghold and even here the Liberal Democrats won Chells Division.

== Results ==
Hertfordshire County Council Election Results 2005
Party	Seats	Gains	Losses	Net gain/loss	Seats %	Votes %	Votes	+/−
Conservative	46	8	2	▲6	59.7	42.5	215,247	+1.6
Labour	16	1	12	▼11	20.8	26.1	132,168	-7.7
Liberal Democrats	14	6	2	▲4	18.2	26.3	132,926	+2.6
Green	1	1	0	▲1	1.3	4.7	24,027	+3.4
BNP	0	0	0	Steady	0.0	0.2	1,025	+0.1
Independent	0	0	0	Steady	0.0	0.1	656	±0.0
UKIP	0	0	0	Steady	0.0	0.1	247	N/A

== Results Summary By District ==
Broxbourne District County Council Election Results 2005
Party	Seats	Gains	Losses	Net gain/loss	Seats %	Votes %	Votes	+/−
Conservative	6	0	0	0	100.0	56.5	21,570	
Labour	0	0	0	0	0	25.4	9,689	
Liberal Democrats	0	0	0	0	0	12.9	4,929	
BNP	0	0	0	0	0	2.7	1,025	
Green	0	0	0	0	0	1.7	649	
Independent	0	0	0	0	0	0.8	302	

Dacorum District County Council Election Results 2005
Party	Seats	Gains	Losses	Net gain/loss	Seats %	Votes %	Votes	+/−
Conservative	5	0	2	-2	50.0	41.9	29,335	
Labour	4	1	0	+1	40.0	28.6	20,063	
Liberal Democrats	1	1	0	+1	10.0	23.6	16,541	
Green	0	0	0	0	0	5.5	3,878	
UKIP	0	0	0	0	0	0.4	247	

East Herts District County Council Election Results 2005
Party	Seats	Gains	Losses	Net gain/loss	Seats %	Votes %	Votes	+/−
Conservative	10	0	0	0	100.0	51.1	33,284	
Liberal Democrats	0	0	0	0	0.0	22.4	14,555	
Labour	0	0	0	0	0.0	20.2	13,131	
Green	0	0	0	0	0	6.3	4,019	

Hertsmere District County Council Election Results 2005
Party	Seats	Gains	Losses	Net gain/loss	Seats %	Votes %	Votes	+/−
Conservative	5	1	0	+1	71.4	50.4	21,644	
Labour	1	0	1	-1	14.3	25.3	10,850	
Liberal Democrats	1	0	0	0	14.3	22.5	9,641	
Green	0	0	0	0	0	1.8	743	

North Herts District County Council Election Results 2005
Party	Seats	Gains	Losses	Net gain/loss	Seats %	Votes %	Votes	+/−
Conservative	7	1	0	+1	77.78	43.0	26,591	
Labour	2	0	0	0	22.22	25.9	16,165	
Liberal Democrats	0	0	1	-1	0.0	25.7	15,923	
Green	0	0	0	0	0	5.4	3,378	

St Albans District County Council Election Results 2005
Party	Seats	Gains	Losses	Net gain/loss	Seats %	Votes %	Votes	+/−
Conservative	5	2	0	+2	50.0	38.0	25,925	
Liberal Democrats	5	2	0	+2	50.0	34.8	23,745	
Labour	0	0	4	-4	0	21.5	14,607	
Green	0	0	0	0	0	5.1	3,378	
Independent	0	0	0	0	0	0.6	354	

Stevenage District County Council Election Results 2005
Party	Seats	Gains	Losses	Net gain/loss	Seats %	Votes %	Votes	+/−
Labour	5	0	1	-1	83.4	44.3	14,921	
Conservative	0	0	0	0	0	29.3	9,824	
Liberal Democrats	1	1	0	+1	16.6	24.4	8,184	
Green	0	0	0	0	0	2.0	683	

Three Rivers District County Council Election Results 2005
Party	Seats	Gains	Losses	Net gain/loss	Seats %	Votes %	Votes	+/−
Liberal Democrats	2	0	1	-1	33.3	39.3	16,036	
Conservative	3	1	0	+1	50.0	39.2	16,014	
Labour	1	0	0	0	16.7	17.2	7,011	
Green	0	0	0	0	0	4.3	1,743	

Watford District County Council Election Results 2005
Party	Seats	Gains	Losses	Net gain/loss	Seats %	Votes %	Votes	+/−
Liberal Democrats	3	1	0	+1	50.0	38.5	14,645	
Labour	1	0	2	-2	16.66	27.5	10,452	
Conservative	1	0	0	0	16.66	25.3	9,608	
Green	1	1	0	+1	16.66	8.7	3,339	

Welwyn Hatfield District County Council Election Results 2005
Party	Seats	Gains	Losses	Net gain/loss	Seats %	Votes %	Votes	+/−
Conservative	4	2	0	+2	57.2	44.9	21,452	
Labour	2	0	3	-3	28.5	32.0	15,279	
Liberal Democrats	1	1	0	+1	14.3	18.4	8,727	
Green	0	0	0	0	0	4.7	2,217	

== Broxbourne (6 Seats) ==
Cheshunt Central 5 May 2005 Broxbourne District
Party	Candidate	Votes	%	±%
Conservative	David Hewitt	3,338	53.3	+0.8
Labour	James Meadows	1,640	26.0	−5.9
Liberal Democrats	Michael Gould	731	11.6	+0.5
BNP	Stephen McCole	571	9.1	+5.0
Majority		1,698		
Turnout		6,280	57.8	
Conservative hold		Swing		

Flamstead End & Turnford 5 May 2005 Broxbourne District
Party	Candidate	Votes	%	±%
Conservative	Anthony Mitchell	4,118	59.6	+7.8
Labour	Ronald McCole	1,685	24.2	−8.6
Liberal Democrats	Peter Huse	799	11.5	0.0
Green	Ernest Harris	327	4.7	+0.7
Majority		2,433		
Turnout		6,929	57.4	
Conservative hold		Swing		

Goffs Oak & Bury Green 5 May 2005 Broxbourne District
Party	Candidate	Votes	%	±%
Conservative	Russell Thomas	3,949	61.9	+0.2
Labour	Cherry Robbins	1,400	21.9	−4.7
Liberal Democrats	Michael Winrow	736	11.5	0.2
Independent	Andrew Ager	302	4.7	+4.7
Majority		2,549		
Turnout		6,387	60.4	
Conservative hold		Swing		

Hoddesdon North 5 May 2005 Broxbourne District
Party	Candidate	Votes	%	±%
Conservative	John Morton	3,258	54.9	+3.4
Labour	Annette Marples	1,629	27.3	−6.9
Liberal Democrats	Nicholas Garton	741	12.4	−1.7
Green	Doreen Willis	322	5.4	+5.4
Majority		1,629		
Turnout		5,950	59.8	
Conservative hold		Swing		

Hoddesdon South 5 May 2005 Broxbourne District
Party	Candidate	Votes	%	±%
Conservative	Alan Searing	4,590	63.8	+6.1
Labour	Marios Kousoulou	1,315	18.5	−7.1
Liberal Democrats	Kirstie De Rivaz	1,260	17.7	+1.3
Majority		3,275		
Turnout		7,165	59.8	
Conservative hold		Swing		

Waltham Cross 5 May 2005 Broxbourne District
Party	Candidate	Votes	%	±%
Conservative	Terence Price	2,317	42.3	−7.5
Labour	Malcolm Aitken	2,020	36.9	−1.6
Liberal Democrats	Neil Savage	662	12.1	+2.1
BNP	Richard Lankester	454	8.3	+8.3
Majority		297		
Turnout		5,453	54.7	
Conservative hold		Swing		

== Dacorum (10 Seats) ==
Berkhampstead 5 May 2005 Dacorum District
Party	Candidate	Votes	%	±%
Conservative	Kenneth Coleman	3,807	41.6	+1.7
Liberal Democrats	Garrick Stevens	3,417	37.2	+1.2
Labour	Ray Jones	1,336	14.5	−4.5
Green	Marion Baker	613	6.7	+1.9
Majority		390		
Turnout		9,173	70.1	
Conservative hold		Swing		

Bridgewater 5 May 2005 Dacorum District
Party	Candidate	Votes	%	±%
Conservative	David Lloyd	3,409	56.4	+1.2
Liberal Democrats	Lloyd Harris	1,243	20.5	+3.0
Labour	Beryl Milnes	1,065	17.6	−4.6
Green	Paul Sandford	331	5.5	+0.4
Majority		2,166		
Turnout		6,048	71.4	
Conservative hold		Swing		

Hemel Hempstead East 5 May 2005 Dacorum District
Party	Candidate	Votes	%	±%
Conservative	Peter Channell	2,933	46.6	+1.4
Labour	Jane Hogg	2,138	33.7	−7.5
Liberal Democrats	Sheila Daly	994	15.7	+2.5
Green	Hazel Johnson	257	4.0	+4.0
Majority		795		
Turnout		6,322	64.8	
Conservative hold		Swing		

Hemel Hempstead North East 5 May 2005 Dacorum District
Party	Candidate	Votes	%	±%
Labour	Margaret Coxage	2,277	40.0	+3.3
Conservative	Fiona Guest	2,248	39.6	−7.0
Liberal Democrats	John Blackman	893	15.7	−0.4
Green	Colin Thoma	264	4.7	+4.7
Majority		29		
Turnout		5,683	56.7	
Labour gain from Conservative		Swing		

Hemel Hempstead North West 5 May 2005 Dacorum District
Party	Candidate	Votes	%	±%
Labour	Ian Laidlaw-Dickson	3,190	41.8	−9.3
Conservative	Colette Wyatt-Lowe	2,692	35.7	+2.2
Liberal Democrats	Geofrey Lawrence	1,100	14.4	−0.2
Green	Paul Harris	379	4.9	+4.9
UKIP	Anthony Piears	247	3.2	+3.2
Majority		498		
Turnout		7,604	66.6	
Labour hold		Swing		

Hemel Hempstead St Paul 5 May 2005 Dacorum District
Party	Candidate	Votes	%	±%
Labour	Elamthalaiva Singham	2,340	43.9	−7.0
Conservative	Kevin Minier	1,588	29.8	+2.2
Liberal Democrats	Brenda Link	1,128	21.5	−0.7
Green	Ian Harris	256	4.8	+4.8
Majority		752		
Turnout		5,312	59.5	
Labour hold		Swing		

Hemel Hempstead South East 5 May 2005 Dacorum District
Party	Candidate	Votes	%	±%
Labour	Gary Cook	2,856	42.2	−9.1
Conservative	Terence Douris	2,400	35.9	+2.4
Liberal Democrats	Sylvia Fry	1,158	17.1	+4.1
Green	Francois Henderson	322	4.8	+3.1
Majority		456		
Turnout		6,736	62.5	
Labour hold		Swing		

Hemel Hempstead Town 5 May 2005 Dacorum District
Party	Candidate	Votes	%	±%
Conservative	Stephen Holmes	2,904	38.9	−0.9
Labour	Maureen Flint	2,494	33.8	−4.7
Liberal Democrats	Lesley Murray	1,534	20.6	+4.1
Green	Alan Johnson	499	6.7	+2.3
Majority		410		
Turnout		7,431	66.2	
Conservative hold		Swing		

Kings Langley 5 May 2005 Dacorum District
Party	Candidate	Votes	%	±%
Conservative	Richard Roberts	3,777	52.6	+1.6
Labour	Stephen Cox	1,490	20.7	−4.6
Liberal Democrats	Barry Batchelor	1,458	20.2	+2.4
Green	Martin Humphrey	467	6.5	+1.1
Majority		2,287		
Turnout		7,192	70.5	
Conservative hold		Swing		

Tring 5 May 2005 Dacorum District
Party	Candidate	Votes	%	±%
Liberal Democrats	Nicholas Hollinghurst	3,616	42.2	+7.5
Conservative	Stanley Mills	3,577	41.9	−0.6
Labour	Michael Maloney	877	10.2	−7.2
Green	Colin Kruger	493	5.7	+0.4
Majority		39		
Turnout		8,563	72.0	
Liberal Democrats gain from Conservative		Swing		

== East Herts (10 Seats) ==
All Saints 5 May 2005 East Herts District
Party	Candidate	Votes	%	±%
Conservative	Sarah Newton	2,962	46.5	+5.4
Labour	John Foster	1,720	26.8	−6.1
Liberal Democrats	Beryl Wrangles	1,333	20.8	−4.7
Green	Nigel Tierney-Howitt	376	5.9	+5.9
Majority		1,242		
Turnout		6,391	70.0	
Conservative hold		Swing		

Bishop's Stortford East 5 May 2005 East Herts District
Party	Candidate	Votes	%	±%
Conservative	Bernard Engel	2,591	41.9	+2.5
Liberal Democrats	Michael Wood	2,399	38.9	+2.3
Labour	Dian Mitchell	855	14.3	−5.4
Green	Bryan Evans	306	4.9	+0.9
Majority		192		
Turnout		6,181	68.0	
Conservative hold		Swing		

Bishop's Stortford Rural 5 May 2005 East Herts District
Party	Candidate	Votes	%	±%
Conservative	Mary Bayes	3,739	55.8	+4.8
Liberal Democrats	Andrew Macpherson	1,367	20.6	−1.7
Labour	Nikki O'Reilly	1,114	16.6	−5.3
Green	Clifford Leggett	473	7.0	+2.5
Majority		2,372		
Turnout		6,693	67.3	
Conservative hold		Swing		

Bishop's Stortford West 5 May 2005 East Herts District
Party	Candidate	Votes	%	±%
Conservative	Duncan Peek	2,997	45.6	+4.6
Liberal Democrats	Gerald Francis	1,977	29.7	+3.0
Labour	John Battersby	1,308	19.7	−8.3
Green	Graham White	331	5.0	+0.7
Majority		1,020		
Turnout		6,613	64.1	
Conservative hold		Swing		

Braughing 5 May 2005 East Herts District
Party	Candidate	Votes	%	±%
Conservative	Jane Pitman	3,704	54.8	+1.1
Labour	Steven Stone	1,420	21.3	−7.2
Liberal Democrats	Paul Moore	1,192	17.6	+1.0
Green	Arup Chatterjee	423	6.3	+6.3
Majority		2,284		
Turnout		6,739	70.0	
Conservative hold		Swing		

Hertford Rural 5 May 2005 East Herts District
Party	Candidate	Votes	%	±%
Conservative	Bryan Hammond	4,071	59.6	+6.7
Labour	John Lloyd	1,249	18.8	−7.0
Liberal Democrats	John Ledden	1,015	14.9	−0.5
Green	Lydia Somerville	455	6.7	+1.0
Majority		2,822		
Turnout		6,790	74.2	
Conservative hold		Swing		

St Andrews 5 May 2005 East Herts District
Party	Candidate	Votes	%	±%
Conservative	Peter Ruffles	3,140	51.2	+2.0
Labour	Anthony Bodley	1,623	26.4	−9.6
Liberal Democrats	Michael Jones	945	15.3	+0.7
Green	Barry Cheal	438	7.1	+7.1
Majority		1,517		
Turnout		6,146	65.7	
Conservative hold		Swing		

Sawbridgeworth 5 May 2005 East Herts District
Party	Candidate	Votes	%	±%
Conservative	Anthony Dodd	3,931	57.7	+4.8
Labour	Linda Harvey	1,302	18.9	−5.9
Liberal Democrats	David Davies	1,221	17.7	−4.4
Green	Stephen Tibbitts	396	5.7	+5.7
Majority		2,629		
Turnout		6,850	67.2	
Conservative hold		Swing		

Ware North 5 May 2005 East Herts District
Party	Candidate	Votes	%	±%
Conservative	David Beatty	2,904	45.8	+1.2
Liberal Democrats	John Wing	1,874	29.7	+6.4
Labour	Alexander Young	1,215	19.1	−8.2
Green	Glen Baker	342	5.4	+1.0
Majority		1,030		
Turnout		6,335	66.4	
Conservative hold		Swing		

Ware South 5 May 2005 East Herts District
Party	Candidate	Votes	%	±%
Conservative	Michael Tucker	3,245	51.9	+1.6
Labour	John Stapleton	1,295	20.6	−8.6
Liberal Democrats	Anthony Gubb	1,232	19.9	−0.2
Green	Peter Hart	479	7.6	+7.6
Majority		1,950		
Turnout		6,251	65.4	
Conservative hold		Swing		

== Hertsmere (7 Seats) ==
Borehamwood North 5 May 2005 Hertsmere District
Party	Candidate	Votes	%	±%
Labour	John Metcalf	2,516	43.9	−11.0
Conservative	David Heywood	2,153	37.9	+5.8
Liberal Democrats	Mark Silverman	774	13.9	+0.9
Green	Sonia Waller	248	4.3	+4.3
Majority		363		
Turnout		5,691	55.4	
Labour hold		Swing		

Borehamwood South 5 May 2005 Hertsmere District
Party	Candidate	Votes	%	±%
Conservative	Jean Heywood	2,400	42.9	+8.1
Labour	Brian York	2,329	41.7	−7.9
Liberal Democrats	Ziz Kakoulakis	854	15.4	+3.4
Majority		71		
Turnout		5,583		
Conservative gain from Labour		Swing		

Bushey North 5 May 2005 Hertsmere District
Party	Candidate	Votes	%	±%
Liberal Democrats	Michael Colne	2,559	46.8	+0.4
Conservative	John Slade	1,807	32.9	−0.8
Labour	George Bath	876	16.2	−2.7
Green	Anna Rackett	223	4.1	+4.1
Majority		752		
Turnout		5,465	65.5	
Liberal Democrats hold		Swing		

Bushey South 5 May 2005 Hertsmere District
Party	Candidate	Votes	%	±%
Conservative	Seamus Quilty	3,609	56.5	+6.9
Liberal Democrats	Roger Kutchinsky	1,534	24.0	−9.2
Labour	David Bearfield	965	15.2	−1.6
Green	Ramiro Alvarado-Vera	272	4.3	+4.3
Majority		2,075		
Turnout		6,380	67.9	
Conservative hold		Swing		

Potters Bar East 5 May 2005 Hertsmere District
Party	Candidate	Votes	%	±%
Conservative	Edwin Roach	4,130	57.4	+3.6
Labour	Russell Ramshaw	1,600	22.3	−6.2
Liberal Democrats	Peter Bonner	1,451	20.3	+3.1
Majority		2,530		
Turnout		7,181	65.2	
Conservative hold		Swing		

Potters Bar West & Shenley 5 May 2005 Hertsmere District
Party	Candidate	Votes	%	±%
Conservative	John Usher	2,999	53.7	+4.9
Labour	James Fisher	1,394	24.9	−8.3
Liberal Democrats	Colin Dean	1,186	21.4	+3.6
Majority		1,605		
Turnout		5,579	65.6	
Conservative hold		Swing		

Watling 5 May 2005 Hertsmere District
Party	Candidate	Votes	%	±%
Conservative	Hugh Saunders	4,546	64.7	+4.0
Liberal Democrats	David Bird	1,283	18.5	+2.7
Labour	Richard Kirk	1,170	16.8	−6.6
Majority		3,263		
Turnout		6,999	68.3	
Conservative hold		Swing		

== North Herts (9 Seats) ==
Hitchin North 5 May 2005 North Herts District
Party	Candidate	Votes	%	±%
Labour	David Billing	2,840	40.4	−9.5
Conservative	Richard Thake	2,204	31.4	0.0
Liberal Democrats	David Shirley	1,425	20.4	+6.4
Green	Sarah Pond	545	7.8	+3.1
Majority		636		
Turnout		7,014	64.7	
Labour hold		Swing		

Hitchin Rural 5 May 2005 North Herts District
Party	Candidate	Votes	%	±%
Conservative	Nigel Brook	2,825	48.9	+4.0
Labour	Martin Stears	1,700	29.5	−10.8
Liberal Democrats	Andrew Ircha	878	15.4	+0.7
Green	Harold Bland	359	6.2	+6.2
Majority		1,125		
Turnout		5,762	63.9	
Conservative hold		Swing		

Hitchin South 5 May 2005 North Herts District
Party	Candidate	Votes	%	±%
Conservative	Derrick Ashley	3,072	44.9	−4.2
Liberal Democrats	Paul Clark	2,466	35.9	+8.9
Labour	Douglas McCall	980	14.3	−8.7
Green	Tony Ware	338	4.9	+4.9
Majority		606		
Turnout		6,856	71.1	
Conservative hold		Swing		

Knebworth & Codicote 5 May 2005 North Herts District
Party	Candidate	Votes	%	±%
Conservative	Robert Ellis	4,054	55.1	0.0
Liberal Democrats	Debra Wilkins	1,417	19.4	+4.7
Labour	Sandra Jackson	1,343	18.4	−7.3
Green	David Ashton	512	7.1	+2.8
Majority		2,637		
Turnout		7,326	68.1	
Conservative hold		Swing		

Letchworth East & Baldock 5 May 2005 North Herts District
Party	Candidate	Votes	%	±%
Conservative	Michael Muir	2,781	40.9	+0.9
Labour	Lorna Kercher	2,456	35.9	−7.1
Liberal Democrats	Geoffrey Hollands	1,230	18.3	+1.5
Green	Julian Smith	338	4.9	+4.9
Majority		325		
Turnout		6,805	61.0	
Conservative gain from Labour		Swing		

Letchworth North West 5 May 2005 North Herts District
Party	Candidate	Votes	%	±%
Labour	Niger Agar	2,446	43.7	−11.4
Conservative	Michael Patterson	1,781	31.9	3.9
Liberal Democrats	John Winder	1,085	19.2	+2.5
Green	Heidi Mollart-Griffin	293	5.2	+5.2
Majority		665		
Turnout		5,585	60.7	
Labour hold		Swing		

Letchworth South 5 May 2005 North Herts District
Party	Candidate	Votes	%	±%
Conservative	Keith Emsall	3,177	42.7	+4.7
Liberal Democrats	John Winder	1,968	26.5	−6.1
Labour	Peter Mardell	1,955	26.3	−2.9
Green	Donald Flockhart	348	4.7	+4.7
Majority		1,209		
Turnout		7,448	67.7	
Conservative hold		Swing		

North Herts Rural 5 May 2005 North Herts District
Party	Candidate	Votes	%	±%
Conservative	Anthony Hunter	3,226	44.4	+3.1
Liberal Democrats	Ian Simpson	2,890	39.8	−5.8
Labour	Kenneth Garland	873	12.1	−0.9
Green	Stuart Madgin	270	3.7	+3.7
Majority		336		
Turnout		7,259	71.2	
Conservative gain from Liberal Democrats		Swing		

Royston 5 May 2005 North Herts District
Party	Candidate	Votes	%	±%
Conservative	Doug Drake	3,471	43.3	+0.9
Liberal Democrats	Caroline Coates	2,584	32.3	+6.3
Labour	Vaughan West	1,572	19.7	−11.5
Green	Karen Harmel	375	4.7	+4.7
Majority		887		
Turnout		8,002	66.0	
Conservative hold		Swing		

== St Albans (10 Seats) ==
Harpenden North East 5 May 2005 St Albans District
Party	Candidate	Votes	%	±%
Conservative	Bernard Lloyd	3,366	46.6	+0.9
Liberal Democrats	Jeffrey Phillips	2,452	33.9	−1.0
Labour	Rosemary Ross	990	13.8	−5.3
Green	Denise Taylor-Roome	414	5.7	+5.7
Majority		914		
Turnout		7,222	71.8	
Conservative hold		Swing		

Harpenden South West 5 May 2005 St Albans District
Party	Candidate	Votes	%	±%
Conservative	Iris Tarry	4,271	55.9	−0.4
Liberal Democrats	Christopher Canfield	1,952	25.8	−0.1
Labour	Linda Spiri	908	11.9	−5.9
Green	Marc Sheimann	469	6.4	+6.4
Majority		2,319		
Turnout		7,600	73.9	
Conservative hold		Swing		

St Albans Central 5 May 2005 St Albans District
Party	Candidate	Votes	%	±%
Liberal Democrats	Christopher White	2,833	42.6	−0.2
Conservative	David Harvey	1,610	24.3	+0.8
Labour	David Byatt	1,569	23.5	−8.2
Green	Simon Grover	535	8.0	+8.0
Independent	Vera Tinson	104	1.6	+1.6
Majority		1,223		
Turnout		6,651	70.5	
Liberal Democrats hold		Swing		

St Albans East 5 May 2005 St Albans District
Party	Candidate	Votes	%	±%
Liberal Democrats	Robert Prowse	2,247	34.0	−2.0
Labour	Edward Hill	2,044	31.0	−7.9
Conservative	James Vessey	1,705	25.9	+3.6
Green	Rosalind Paul	335	5.2	+5.2
Independent	Elizabeth Saul	250	3.9	+3.9
Majority		203		
Turnout		6,581	68.7	
Liberal Democrats gain from Labour		Swing		

St Albans North 5 May 2005 St Albans District
Party	Candidate	Votes	%	±%
Liberal Democrats	Allan Witherick	2,260	32.1	+0.3
Conservative	Richard Bretherton	2,250	32.1	+5.8
Labour	David Allan	1,993	28.5	−13.0
Green	Mark Ewington	508	7.4	+7.4
Majority		10		
Turnout		7,011	70.6	
Liberal Democrats gain from Labour		Swing		

St Albans Rural 5 May 2005 St Albans District
Party	Candidate	Votes	%	±%
Conservative	Derek Hills	2,778	42.7	−0.6
Liberal Democrats	Christopher Oxley	2,627	40.4	+0.1
Labour	Andrew Viner	720	11.0	−5.4
Green	William Berrington	389	5.9	−5.9
Majority		151		
Turnout		6,514	72.2	
Conservative hold		Swing		

St Albans South 5 May 2005 St Albans District
Party	Candidate	Votes	%	±%
Conservative	Robert Clarkson	2,529	36.2	+3.9
Liberal Democrats	Peter Burton	2,486	36.0	+7.6
Labour	Janet Smith	1,956	27.8	−8.5
Majority		43		
Turnout		6,971	70.7	
Conservative gain from Labour		Swing		

St Stephen's 5 May 2005 St Albans District
Party	Candidate	Votes	%	±%
Liberal Democrats	Aislinn Lee	3,195	44.2	+1.2
Conservative	Pamela Clarkson	2,803	38.8	+1.6
Labour	Janet Blackwell	1,020	14.2	−5.4
Green	Kristian Tizzard	206	2.8	+2.8
Majority		392		
Turnout		7,224	72.0	
Liberal Democrats hold		Swing		

Sandridge 5 May 2005 St Albans District
Party	Candidate	Votes	%	±%
Liberal Democrats	Geoffrey Churchard	2,359	39.8	−4.2
Conservative	Beric Read	2,232	37.6	+2.7
Labour	John Baughan	1,054	17.8	−3.2
Green	Eric Harber	285	4.8	+4.8
Majority		127		
Turnout		5,930	71.2	
Liberal Democrats hold		Swing		

The Colneys 5 May 2005 St Albans District
Party	Candidate	Votes	%	±%
Conservative	Brian Lee	2,381	37.6	+3.8
Labour	Rosemary Sanderson	2353	37.4	−8.0
Liberal Democrats	Richard Biddle	1,334	21.3	+0.8
Green	Stephen Clough	237	3.7	+3.7
Majority		28		
Turnout		6,305	64.3	
Conservative gain from Labour		Swing		

== Stevenage (6 Seats) ==
Bedwell 5 May 2005 Stevenage District
Party	Candidate	Votes	%	±%
Labour	Tanis Kent	2,690	55.4	−6.0
Conservative	Christine St Leitner	1,209	24.9	+2.3
Liberal Democrats	Audrey Griffith	949	19.7	+3.6
Majority		1,481		
Turnout		4,848	55.2	
Labour hold		Swing		

Broadwater 5 May 2005 Stevenage District
Party	Candidate	Votes	%	±%
Labour	Sherma Batson	2,309	43.6	−10.1
Conservative	Matthew Hurst	1,608	30.5	+2.0
Liberal Democrats	Elisabeth Knight	1,074	20.4	+3.1
Green	William Hoyes	292	5.5	+5.5
Majority		701		
Turnout		5,283	61.1	
Labour hold		Swing		

Chells 5 May 2005 Stevenage District
Party	Candidate	Votes	%	±%
Liberal Democrats	Robin Parker	2,533	42.6	+10.4
Labour	Hugh Tessier	2,002	33.7	−10.7
Conservative	Galina Dimelow	1,399	23.7	+0.4
Majority		531		
Turnout		5,934	67.8	
Liberal Democrats gain from Labour		Swing		

Old Stevenage 5 May 2005 Stevenage District
Party	Candidate	Votes	%	±%
Labour	Michael Downing	2,707	41.2	−6.2
Conservative	James Fraser	2,347	35.8	+2.6
Liberal Democrats	Jennifer Moorcroft	1,122	17.1	+2.7
Green	Bernard Chapman	391	5.9	+1.2
Majority		360		
Turnout		6,567	60.9	
Labour hold		Swing		

St Nicholas 5 May 2005 Stevenage District
Party	Candidate	Votes	%	±%
Labour	David Cullen	2,681	44.5	−8.1
Conservative	Jody Hanafin	1,860	30.9	+3.3
Liberal Democrats	Graham Snell	1,474	24.6	+9.2
Majority		821		
Turnout		6,015	56.6	
Labour hold		Swing		

Shephall 5 May 2005 Stevenage District
Party	Candidate	Votes	%	±%
Labour	David Royall	2,532	50.9	−7.3
Conservative	Ralph Dimelow	1,401	28.2	+3.9
Liberal Democrats	Nicholas Baskerville	1,032	20.9	+6.6
Majority		1,131		
Turnout		4,965	56.2	
Labour hold		Swing		

== Three Rivers (6 Seats) ==
Abbots Langley 5 May 2005 Three Rivers District
Party	Candidate	Votes	%	±%
Liberal Democrats	Paul Goggins	4,511	54.1	+7.9
Conservative	Teresa Paddington	2,043	24.6	−3.5
Labour	Jeannie Mehta	1,455	17.6	−7.8
Green	Miranda March	309	3.7	+3.7
Majority		2,468		
Turnout		8,328	68.9	
Liberal Democrats hold		Swing		

Chorleywood 5 May 2005 Three Rivers District
Party	Candidate	Votes	%	±%
Conservative	Leonard Spencer	3,493	50.3	+5.4
Liberal Democrats	Martin Trevett	2,403	37.5	−7.9
Labour	David Warburton	547	8.0	−1.4
Green	Tina Kamei	289	4.2	+4.2
Majority		890		
Turnout		6,932	73.7	
Conservative gain from Liberal Democrats		Swing		

Croxley 5 May 2005 Three Rivers District
Party	Candidate	Votes	%	±%
Liberal Democrats	David Drury	3,043	46.7	−6.1
Conservative	David Sansom	2,147	33.0	+4.2
Labour	Leonard Tippen	1,043	16.1	−2.2
Green	John Dowdle	270	4.2	+4.2
Majority		896		
Turnout		6,503	71.6	
Liberal Democrats hold		Swing		

Oxhey Park 5 May 2005 Three Rivers District
Party	Candidate	Votes	%	±%
Conservative	Roy Clements	3,473	49.1	−3.5
Liberal Democrats	Pamela Hames	2,309	32.7	+10.4
Labour	Andrew Head	1,006	14.3	−10.5
Green	Tina Kamei	278	3.9	+3.9
Majority		1,164		
Turnout		7,066	69.1	
Conservative hold		Swing		

Rickmansworth 5 May 2005 Three Rivers District
Party	Candidate	Votes	%	±%
Conservative	Barbara Lamb	4,002	49.9	+2.6
Liberal Democrats	Richard Struck	2,563	31.9	+0.3
Labour	Graham Dale	1,101	14.4	−10.5
Green	Ian West	353	4.4	+4.4
Majority		1,439		
Turnout		7,066	67.2	
Conservative hold		Swing		

South Oxhey 5 May 2005 Three Rivers District
Party	Candidate	Votes	%	±%
Labour	Jane Hobday	1,849	46.7	−5.9
Liberal Democrats	Philip Brading	1,007	25.5	+2.6
Conservative	David Benatar	856	21.7	−2.1
Green	Elaine Edwards	244	6.1	+6.1
Majority		842		
Turnout		3,956	53.0	
Labour hold		Swing		

== Watford (6 Seats) ==
Callowland Leggatts 5 May 2005 Watford District
Party	Candidate	Votes	%	±%
Green	Stephen Rackett	1,820	29.1	+24.1
Labour	Geoffrey O'Connell	1,715	27.5	−23.5
Liberal Democrats	Tariq Chohan	1,535	24.6	+8.2
Conservative	Stephen O'Brien	1,170	18.8	−8.4
Majority		105		
Turnout		6,240	61.3	
Green gain from Labour		Swing		

Central Oxhey 5 May 2005 Watford District
Party	Candidate	Votes	%	±%
Liberal Democrats	Stephen Giles – Medhurst	2,751	45.3	+0.2
Labour	Michael Jones	1,498	24.7	−5.4
Conservative	Richard Bamford	1,430	23.7	+3.5
Green	Ruth Atkin	375	6.3	+1.8
Majority		1,253		
Turnout		6,054	61.1	
Liberal Democrats hold		Swing		

Meriden Tudor 5 May 2005 Watford District
Party	Candidate	Votes	%	±%
Liberal Democrats	Audrey Oaten	2,468	39.2	+23.2
Labour	Marion Chambers	1,922	30.5	−13.6
Conservative	Richard Southern	1,641	25.9	−6.7
Green	Sanrara Byrne	275	4.4	−2.9
Majority		546		
Turnout		6,306	64.6	
Liberal Democrats gain from Labour		Swing		

Nascot Park 5 May 2005 Watford District
Party	Candidate	Votes	%	±%
Conservative	Robert Gordon	3,017	41.5	−5.4
Liberal Democrats	George Derbyshire	2,800	38.5	+15.5
Labour	Thomas Meldrum	1,128	15.4	−10.2
Green	Sally Ivins	339	4.6	+0.1
Majority		217		
Turnout		7,284	70.0	
Conservative hold		Swing		

Vicarage Hollywell 5 May 2005 Watford District
Party	Candidate	Votes	%	±%
Labour	Nigel Bell	2,478	42.3	−8.7
Liberal Democrats	Maria Green	2,116	36.1	+10.6
Conservative	David Ealey	966	16.7	−1.8
Green	Philip Mitchell	286	4.9	+0.4
Majority		362		
Turnout		5,846	56.2	
Labour hold		Swing		

Woodside Stanborough 5 May 2005 Watford District
Party	Candidate	Votes	%	±%
Liberal Democrats	Derek Scudder	2,975	47.1	+8.1
Labour	John Young	1,711	27.1	−7.5
Conservative	Jonathan Cordell	1,384	21.9	−2.2
Green	Kevin Pettifer	244	3.9	+1.6
Majority		1,264		
Turnout		6,314	63.0	
Liberal Democrats hold		Swing		

== Welwyn Hatfield (7 Seats) ==
Haldens 5 May 2005 Welwyn Hatfield District
Party	Candidate	Votes	%	±%
Labour	Robert Mays	2,652	40.7	−7.0
Conservative	Darren Bennett	2,436	37.4	+3.6
Liberal Democrats	Jonathan Arch	1,051	16.2	−2.0
Green	Deborah Pearce	373	5.7	+5.7
Majority		216		
Turnout		6,512	67.9	
Labour hold		Swing		

Handside & Peartree 5 May 2005 Welwyn Hatfield District
Party	Candidate	Votes	%	±%
Liberal Democrats	Malcolm Cowan	2,146	33.9	+13.4
Labour	Mike Hobday	2,113	33.4	−8.9
Conservative	Carl Storer	2,067	32.7	−4.3
Majority		33		
Turnout		6,326	67.0	
Liberal Democrats gain from Labour		Swing		

Hatfield North 5 May 2005 Welwyn Hatfield District
Party	Candidate	Votes	%	±%
Conservative	Clare Berry	3,121	38.5	+3.3
Labour	Maureen Cook	3,112	38.5	−7.6
Liberal Democrats	Lis Meyland – Smith	1,434	17.7	−0.6
Green	Graham Laverick	430	5.3	+5.3
Majority		9		
Turnout		8,097	63.3	
Conservative gain from Labour		Swing		

Hatfield Rural 5 May 2005 Welwyn Hatfield District
Party	Candidate	Votes	%	±%
Conservative	William Storey	4,783	71.4	+4.5
Labour	Melvyn Jones	804	12.2	−1.8
Liberal Democrats	Jennifer Blumsom	741	11.2	−1.7
Green	Gill Wright	351	5.2	−0.6
Majority		3,979		
Turnout		6,679	73.3	
Conservative hold		Swing		

Hatfield South 5 May 2005 Welwyn Hatfield District
Party	Candidate	Votes	%	±%
Conservative	Stuart Pile	2,418	42.2	+4.9
Labour	Linda Mendez	2,159	37.7	−7.3
Liberal Democrats	Simon Archer	934	16.4	−1.3
Green	Adrian Toole	215	3.1	+3.7
Majority		259		
Turnout		5,726	63.9	
Conservative gain from Labour		Swing		

Welwyn 5 May 2005 Welwyn Hatfield District
Party	Candidate	Votes	%	±%
Conservative	Richard Smith	4,607	53.7	+1.8
Labour	Anthony Crump	1,894	22.2	−7.7
Liberal Democrats	Ian Skidmore	1,536	17.9	−0.2
Green	Robert Somerville	524	6.2	+6.2
Majority		2,513		
Turnout		8,561	75.7	
Conservative hold		Swing		

Welwyn Garden City South 5 May 2005 Welwyn Hatfield District
Party	Candidate	Votes	%	±%
Labour	Susan Jones	2,545	43.9	−9.4
Conservative	Keith Pieri	2,020	34.9	+4.4
Liberal Democrats	Eirwen Smith	885	15.4	−0.5
Green	Kevin Pressland	324	5.8	+5.8
Majority		525		
Turnout		5,774	65.8	
Labour hold		Swing		
