= 2018 North Hertfordshire District Council election =

2018 UK local government election

← 2016	3 May 2018	2019 →

19 of 49 seats on North Hertfordshire District Council 25 seats needed for a majority
	First party	Second party	Third party
	Con	Lab	LD
Leader	Lynda Needham	Frank Radcliffe	Paul Clark
Party	Conservative	Labour	Liberal Democrats
Seats before	34	12	3
Seats after	29	14	6
Seat change	▼5	▲2	▲3
Popular vote	12,390	9,683	6,445
Percentage	39.6%	31.0%	20.6%
Leader before election
Lynda Needham
Conservative
Leader after election
Lynda Needham
Conservative

The 2018 North Hertfordshire Council election was held on 3 May 2018, at the same time as other local elections across England. Of the 49 seats on North Hertfordshire District Council, 19 were up for election, being the usual third of the council plus a by-election in Letchworth Grange ward.

The Conservatives lost five seats at the election, three to the Liberal Democrats and two to Labour, but retained their majority on the council, with Conservative leader Lynda Needham continuing to serve as leader of the council. The Labour group leader prior to the election was Frank Radcliffe, but he did not stand for re-election and was replaced after the election by Martin Stears-Handscomb.

== Overall results ==
The overall results were as follows:

2018 North Hertfordshire District Council election
Party	This election			Full council			This election		
Party	Seats	Net	Seats %	Other	Total	Total %	Votes	Votes %	+/−
Conservative	8	▼5	42.1	21	29	59.2	12,390	39.6	-0.5
Labour	8	▲2	42.1	6	14	28.6	9,683	31.0	+3.7
Liberal Democrats	3	▲3	15.8	3	6	12.2	6,445	20.6	+5.6
Green	0	Steady	0.0	0	0	0.0	2,293	7.3	-1.3
Independent	0	Steady	0.0	0	0	0.0	332	1.1	0.0
UKIP	0	Steady	0.0	0	0	0.0	109	0.3	-7.6

== Ward results ==
The results for each ward were as follows. Where the previous incumbent was standing for re-election they are marked with an asterisk(*). A double dagger(‡) indicates a sitting councillor contesting a different ward.

Baldock Town ward
Party	Candidate	Votes	%	±%
Conservative	Jim McNally*	970	50.7%	+2.0
Labour	Alec Maguire	579	30.3%	+9.8
Liberal Democrats	Richard William Winter	253	13.2%	+5.7
Green	Heidi Shona Mollart-Griffin	106	5.5%	−3.6
Turnout		1,913	34.1%	
Conservative hold		Swing	-3.9	

Codicote ward
Party	Candidate	Votes	%	±%
Conservative	Ian Moody	524	57.0%	+4.2
Independent	Tom Brindley	172	18.7%	+18.7
Labour	Richard Paul Downey	136	14.8%	+1.5
Liberal Democrats	Luke William Devenish	49	5.3%	+5.3
Green	Rosemary Bland	38	4.1%	−5.1
Turnout		919	43.6%	
Conservative hold		Swing	-7.2	

Hitchin Bearton ward
Party	Candidate	Votes	%	±%
Labour	Val Bryant	1,212	56.3%	+8.2
Conservative	John William Skeeles	474	22.0%	−4.9
Liberal Democrats	Jonathan Daniel Clayden	287	13.3%	+0.7
Green	William Barry Lavin	168	7.8%	−3.5
Turnout		2,153	35.6%	
Labour hold		Swing	+6.6	

Hitchin Highbury ward
Party	Candidate	Votes	%	±%
Liberal Democrats	Sam S. Collins	1,266	47.6%	+2.8
Conservative	Dominic John Crean Griffiths	801	30.1%	−2.6
Labour	Conor Brogan	443	16.6%	+1.0
Green	Diana J. Newson	148	5.6%	−0.3
Turnout		2,661	45.0%	
Liberal Democrats gain from Conservative		Swing	+2.7	

Hitchin Oughton ward
Party	Candidate	Votes	%	±%
Labour	Clare Helen Billing	591	54.2%	+22.4
Conservative	Rebecca Robyn Reidy	312	28.6%	+9.1
Liberal Democrats	Louise Jane Peace	100	9.2%	−9.3
Green	Mary Karin Marshall	83	7.6%	+2.4
Turnout		1,090	31.3%	
Labour hold		Swing	+6.6	

Hitchin Priory ward
Party	Candidate	Votes	%	±%
Conservative	Simon Mark Harwood ‡	660	40.9%	−0.7
Liberal Democrats	George Edmund Osborn	512	31.7%	+8.9
Labour	Dave Winstanley	308	19.1%	+6.4
Green	Des Stephens	123	7.6%	+1.0
Turnout		1,615	45.5%	
Conservative hold		Swing	-4.8	

Hitchin Walsworth ward
Party	Candidate	Votes	%	±%
Labour	Mike Hughson	1,114	48.1%	+9.5
Conservative	Alan John Millard*	693	29.9%	−2.0
Green	Richard Alexander Cano	272	11.7%	−1.6
Liberal Democrats	Andrew Ircha	230	9.9%	+3.6
Turnout		2,317	40.0%	
Labour gain from Conservative		Swing	+5.8	

Hitchwood, Offa and Hoo ward
Party	Candidate	Votes	%	±%
Conservative	Faye Susan Frost*	1,279	63.0%	+7.2
Labour	Anton Jungreuthmayer	369	18.2%	+6.1
Green	David Geoffrey Ashton	200	9.9%	+0.9
Liberal Democrats	Marilyn Margaret Parkin	181	8.9%	−1.3
Turnout		2,030	35.9%	
Conservative hold		Swing	+0.6	

Kimpton ward
Party	Candidate	Votes	%	±%
Conservative	John Cyril Bishop*	426	62.6%	−2.7
Liberal Democrats	Mike Lott	99	14.6%	+14.6
Labour	Tom Hogan	97	14.3%	−0.2
Green	Simon Wightman	52	7.6%	−11.6
Turnout		680	39.0%	
Conservative hold		Swing	-8.6	

Knebworth ward
Party	Candidate	Votes	%	±%
Liberal Democrats	Lisa Nash	957	51.0%	+41.2
Conservative	Steve Hemingway*	742	39.6%	−22.9
Labour	Klazina Hofmann	141	7.5%	−13.9
Green	Nick Newson	29	1.5%	−4.0
Turnout		1,876	47.0%	
Liberal Democrats gain from Conservative		Swing	+32.0	

Letchworth East ward
Party	Candidate	Votes	%	±%
Labour	Sue Ngwala	763	51.4%	+13.2
Conservative	Andrew Clare	369	24.9%	−1.4
Independent	Paul Ross	160	10.8%	+0.5
Liberal Democrats	Liam McKenna	114	7.7%	+1.2
Green	Bernard Charles Michael Lee	71	4.8%	−4.8
Turnout		1,483	34.9%	
Labour hold		Swing	+7.3	

Letchworth Grange ward
Party	Candidate	Votes	%	±%
Labour	Daniel Peter Mark Allen	917	43.4%	+8.5
Labour	Helen Caroline Oliver	912	43.2%	+8.3
Conservative	Morgan William Derbyshire	798	37.8%	+4.5
Conservative	Matthew Frazer Berman	747	35.4%	+2.1
Liberal Democrats	Amy Elizabeth Finch	240	11.4%	+3.6
Liberal Democrats	Aidan Sparrowhawk	198	9.4%	+1.6
Green	Elizabeth Susan Hancock	166	7.9%	+1.5
Turnout		2,112	39.9%	
Labour hold		Swing	+2.0	
Labour hold		Swing		

The by-election in Letchworth Grange ward was triggered by the resignation of Labour councillor Clare Billing in order to contest Hitchin Oughton ward instead.

Letchworth South East ward
Party	Candidate	Votes	%	±%
Labour	Kate Aspinwall	758	39.0%	+7.0
Conservative	John Leo Dobson Booth*	750	38.6%	−0.1
Liberal Democrats	Barry Peter Neale	229	11.8%	+4.7
UKIP	Sidney Arthur Start	109	5.6%	−10.6
Green	Tim Lee	91	4.7%	−0.5
Turnout		1,943	36.5%	
Labour gain from Conservative		Swing	+3.6	

Letchworth South West ward
Party	Candidate	Votes	%	±%
Conservative	Mike Rice*	1,045	43.6%	−5.2
Liberal Democrats	Sean Prendergast	642	26.8%	+23.0
Labour	Jean Andrews	516	21.5%	+1.9
Green	Maryla Josephin Hart	182	7.6%	−1.8
Turnout		2,397	40.7%	
Conservative hold		Swing	-14.1	

Letchworth Wilbury ward
Party	Candidate	Votes	%	±%
Labour	Gary Grindal*	841	58.0%	+20.0
Conservative	John Peter Hamilton Merry	387	26.7%	−10.4
Green	Ian Huw John Clayfield	141	9.7%	−3.3
Liberal Democrats	Brian John Evans	73	5.0%	+5.0
Turnout		1,449	37.7%	
Labour hold		Swing	+15.2	

Royston Heath ward
Party	Candidate	Votes	%	±%
Liberal Democrats	Ruth Brown	864	44.7%	+31.4
Conservative	Fiona Ronan Hill*	786	40.7%	−10.1
Labour	Ken Garland	198	10.3%	−6.0
Green	Katherine Marie Shann	74	3.8%	−3.2
Turnout		1,931	42.9%	
Liberal Democrats gain from Conservative		Swing	+20.7	

Royston Meridian ward
Party	Candidate	Votes	%	±%
Conservative	Bill Davidson*	789	55.1%	−7.8
Green	Karen Harmel	253	17.7%	+8.4
Labour	Jess Finn	246	17.2%	+2.7
Liberal Democrats	David Matthew Lambert	135	9.4%	−3.0
Turnout		1,432	35.6%	
Conservative hold		Swing	-8.1	

Royston Palace ward
Party	Candidate	Votes	%	±%
Conservative	Ben Lewis*	585	43.3%	+0.2
Labour	Rob Inwood	454	33.6%	+10.0
Liberal Democrats	Peter Martin Rice	214	15.8%	+7.0
Green	Angela Clark	96	7.1%	+0.5
Turnout		1,351	32.4%	
Conservative hold		Swing	-4.9	

== Changes 2018–2019 ==
Paul Marment, elected in 2015 as a Conservative councillor for Letchworth Grange ward, defected to the Liberal Democrats in August 2018.
