= 2011 North Hertfordshire District Council election =

Council election in England

← 2010	5 May 2011	2012 →

16 of 49 seats on North Hertfordshire District Council 25 seats needed for a majority
	First party	Second party	Third party
	Con	LD	Lab
Leader	Lynda Needham	Steve Jarvis	David Billing
Party	Conservative	Liberal Democrats	Labour
Seats before	33	9	7
Seats after	34	8	7
Seat change	▲1	▼1	Steady
Popular vote	16,122	5,878	7,626
Percentage	48.4%	17.6%	22.9%
- Results of the 2011 North Hertfordshire District Council election
Leader before election
Lynda Needham
Conservative
Leader after election
Lynda Needham
Conservative

The 2011 North Hertfordshire Council election was held on 5 May 2011, at the same time as other local elections across England and Northern Ireland. Of the 49 seats on North Hertfordshire District Council, 16 were up for election.

The Conservatives gained Chesfield ward from the Liberal Democrats, but no other seats changed party at this election. The Conservatives therefore increased their majority on the council and their leader, Lynda Needham, remained leader of the council.

== Overall results ==
The overall results were as follows:

2011 North Hertfordshire District Council election
Party	This election			Full council			This election		
Party	Seats	Net	Seats %	Other	Total	Total %	Votes	Votes %	+/−
Conservative	12	▲1	75.0	22	34	69.4	16,122	48.4	+1.6
Labour	2	Steady	12.5	5	7	14.3	7,626	17.6	-2.9
Liberal Democrats	2	▼1	15.8	6	8	18,4	5,878	17.6	-7.0
Green	0	Steady	0.0	0	0	0.0	2,744	8.2	+1.8
UKIP	0	Steady	0.0	0	0	0.0	635	1.9	+1.0
Independent	0	Steady	0.0	0	0	0.0	232	0.7	N/A
English Democrat	0	Steady	0.0	0	0	0.0	73	0.2	N/A

== Ward results ==
The results for each ward were as follows. Where the previous incumbent was standing for re-election they are marked with an asterisk (*).

Arbury ward
Party	Candidate	Votes	%	±%
Conservative	Andrew Dempster Young*	796	59.5%	−2.5
Liberal Democrats	Ian Simpson	402	30.0%	−6.8
Labour	Paul David Burgin	89	6.7%	n/a
Green	Eric Morris Blakeley	45	3.4%	n/a
Turnout		1,338	63.8%	
Conservative hold		Swing	+2.2	

Baldock Town ward
Party	Candidate	Votes	%	±%
Conservative	Michael Muir*	1,352	58.0%	+3.9
Labour	Tom Brownlee	529	22.7%	+7.6
Liberal Democrats	Richard William Winter	215	9.2%	−13.6
Green	Annmarie Brinsley	212	9.1%	+5.3
Turnout		2,332	41.5%	
Conservative hold		Swing	-1.9	

Cadwell ward
Party	Candidate	Votes	%	±%
Conservative	Tricia Cowley*	563	57.2%	−10.3
Labour	Martin John Stears-Handscomb	250	25.4%	+13.8
Liberal Democrats	Robin Christopher Lambie	104	10.6%	−10.3
Green	Paul Anthony O'Shaughnessy	58	5.9%	n/a
Turnout		984	56.0%	
Conservative hold		Swing	-12.1	

Chesfield ward
Party	Candidate	Votes	%	±%
Conservative	Cathryn Henry	844	41.5%	+0.6
Liberal Democrats	Sally Margaret Jarvis*	708	34.8%	−8.8
Labour	Bhavna Joshi	375	18.4%	+6.0
Green	Felix Power	92	4.5%	+1.6
Turnout		2,033	38.7%	
Conservative gain from Liberal Democrats		Swing	+4.7	

Ermine ward
Party	Candidate	Votes	%	±%
Conservative	Gerald Edward Morris	835	73.8%	−4.1
Liberal Democrats	John Raymond Ledden	152	13.4%	−8.1
Green	Rebecca Leek	140	12.4%	n/a
Turnout		1,132	56.0%	
Conservative hold		Swing	+2.0	

Hitchin Bearton ward
Party	Candidate	Votes	%	±%
Labour	Judi Billing*	1,466	50.3%	+22.9
Conservative	Alex Stoner	893	30.6%	−1.5
Liberal Democrats	Michael John Lott	288	9.9%	−22.3
Green	Sarah Pond	249	8.5%	+0.8
Turnout		2,916	47.3%	
Labour hold		Swing	+12.2	

Hitchin Highbury ward
Party	Candidate	Votes	%	±%
Liberal Democrats	Paul Clark*	1,239	39.8%	−3.1
Conservative	David Leal-Bennett	1,075	34.6%	−5.8
Labour	Deborah Vincenza Bruna Segalini	338	10.9%	0.0
UKIP	Adrianne Fairfax Smyth	257	8.3%	n/a
Green	Richard Wise	179	5.8%	+0.4
Turnout		3,110	51.8%	
Liberal Democrats hold		Swing	+1.4	

Hitchin Walsworth ward
Party	Candidate	Votes	%	±%
Conservative	Bernard Lovewell*	1,099	40.6%	0.0
Labour	Derek Nigel Sheard	816	30.2%	+6.2
Green	George Howe	328	12.1%	+2.5
Independent	Stuart Gideon Alder	232	8.6%	n/a
Liberal Democrats	Andrew Ircha	207	7.7%	−17.6
Turnout		2,705	44.5%	
Conservative hold		Swing	-3.1	

Hitchwood, Offa and Hoo ward
Party	Candidate	Votes	%	±%
Conservative	David Barnard*	1,867	66.3%	+4.7
Labour	Clare Helen Billing	435	15.4%	+3.0
Liberal Democrats	Peter Donald Johnson	285	10.1%	−9.4
Green	Harold Bland	215	7.6%	+1.6
Turnout		2,818	50.6%	
Conservative hold		Swing	+0.9	

Letchworth Grange ward
Party	Candidate	Votes	%	±%
Labour	David Peter Kearns*	1,083	41.7%	+12.1
Conservative	Blake Stephenson	924	35.6%	−4.6
Liberal Democrats	Martin Geoffrey Penny	185	7.1%	−12.8
UKIP	Michael Richard Rodgers	165	6.4%	n/a
Green	Rosie Bland	145	5.6%	+0.4
English Democrat	Charles Jeremy Vickers	73	2.8%	n/a
Turnout		2,597	45.2%	
Labour hold		Swing	+8.4	

Letchworth South East ward
Party	Candidate	Votes	%	±%
Conservative	Richard Harman	1,149	47.9%	+6.6
Labour	Ramesh Summan	633	26.4%	+0.3
UKIP	Philip Martin Stevens	213	8.9%	+1.8
Liberal Democrats	David Robert May	207	8.6%	−13.1
Green	James Alexander Drew	171	7.1%	+3.7
Turnout		2,400	42.3%	
Conservative hold		Swing	+2.3	

Letchworth South West ward
Party	Candidate	Votes	%	±%
Conservative	Lynda Needham*	1,682	55.9%	+8.3
Labour	Peter Anthony Mardell	481	16.0%	+1.2
Liberal Democrats	John Paul Winder	433	14.4%	−16.2
Green	Mario Alexander May	390	13.0%	+6.4
Turnout		3,007	50.3%	
Conservative hold		Swing	+3.6	

Royston Heath ward
Party	Candidate	Votes	%	±%
Conservative	Peter Colin Weston Burt*	996	53.7%	−0.7
Labour	Ken Garland	354	19.1%	+7.8
Liberal Democrats	Paul Anton Jeray	264	14.2%	−14.9
Green	Phil Oddy	219	11.8%	+7.2
Turnout		1,856	45.4%	
Conservative hold		Swing	-4.3	

Royston Meridian ward
Party	Candidate	Votes	%	±%
Conservative	Tony Hunter*	1,058	58.4%	+3.6
Labour	Vaughan West	333	18.4%	−7.1
Liberal Democrats	Karen Davies	261	14.4%	+1.1
Green	Karen Harmel	141	7.8%	+2.0
Turnout		1,813	44.0%	
Conservative hold		Swing	+5.4	

Royston Palace ward
Party	Candidate	Votes	%	±%
Conservative	Jean Margaret Green	667	42.1%	+5.6
Labour	Les Baker	402	25.4%	+12.8
Liberal Democrats	Tim Greatrex	364	23.0%	−19.7
Green	Peter Groves	126	8.0%	+2.2
Turnout		1,584	39.5%	
Conservative hold		Swing	-3.6	

Weston and Sandon ward
Party	Candidate	Votes	%	±%
Liberal Democrats	Stephen Kenneth Jarvis*	564	58.4%	−14.5
Conservative	Christopher John Schwick	322	33.4%	+7.0
Labour	Andrew Michael Riley	42	4.4%	n/a
Green	Ann Karen De Bock	34	3.5%	n/a
Turnout		965	58.7%	
Liberal Democrats hold		Swing	-10.8	
