= 2014 North Hertfordshire District Council election =

2014 UK local government election

← 2012	22 May 2014	2015 →

18 of 49 seats on North Hertfordshire District Council 25 seats needed for a majority
	First party	Second party	Third party
	Con	Lab	LD
Leader	Lynda Needham	Judi Billing	Steve Jarvis
Party	Conservative	Labour	Liberal Democrats
Seats before	33	11	5
Seats after	34	12	3
Seat change	▲1	▲1	▼2
Popular vote	12,302	7,173	2,441
Percentage	40.1%	23.4%	8.0%
- Results of the 2014 North Hertfordshire District Council election
Leader before election
Lynda Needham
Conservative
Leader after election
Lynda Needham
Conservative

The 2014 North Hertfordshire Council election was held on 22 May 2014, at the same time as other local elections and the European Parliament election. Of the 49 seats on North Hertfordshire District Council, 18 were up for election.

The Conservatives increased their majority on the council. Labour also increased their number of seats, whilst the Liberal Democrats lost both of the seats they were defending at this election.

== Overall results ==
The overall results were as follows:

2014 North Hertfordshire District Council election
Party	This election			Full council			This election		
Party	Seats	Net	Seats %	Other	Total	Total %	Votes	Votes %	+/−
Conservative	13	▲1	72.2	21	34	69.4	12,302	40.1	-2.3
Labour	5	▲1	27.8	7	12	24.5	7,173	23.4	-5.2
UKIP	0	Steady	0.0	0	0	0.0	5,760	18.8	+15.2
Green	0	Steady	0.0	0	0	0.0	3,009	9.8	-0.2
Liberal Democrats	0	▼2	0.0	3	3	6.1	2,441	8.0	-6.4

== Ward results ==
The results for each ward were as follows. Where the previous incumbent was standing for re-election they are marked with an asterisk(*). A double dagger(‡) indicates a sitting councillor contesting a different ward.

Baldock Town ward
Party	Candidate	Votes	%	±%
Conservative	Jim McNally	927	45.6%	−9.1
Labour	Rachel Danae Burgin	349	17.2%	−3.2
Green	Arwen Jane Tapping	173	8.5%	−6.1
Liberal Democrats	Marilyn Roberta Kirkland	138	6.8%	−2.9
Turnout		2,033	34.5%	
Conservative hold		Swing	-3.0	

Codicote ward
Party	Candidate	Votes	%	±%
Conservative	Jane Elizabeth Gray ‡	511	52.8%	−8.2
UKIP	Nick Brooke	225	23.2%	+23.2
Labour	Bhavna Joshi	129	13.3%	−0.4
Green	Ann Karen De Bock	89	9.2%	+1.9
Turnout		968	45.3%	
Conservative hold		Swing	-15.7	

Hitchin Bearton ward
Party	Candidate	Votes	%	±%
Labour	Adrian Smith	936	39.6%	−13.1
Conservative	Nicola Harris	549	23.2%	−3.9
Green	Sarah Pond	318	13.5%	+2.5
UKIP	Peter Croft	279	11.8%	+11.8
Liberal Democrats	Lisa Courts*	275	11.6%	+2.8
Turnout		2,363	36.7%	
Labour gain from Liberal Democrats		Swing	-4.6	

Hitchin Highbury ward
Party	Candidate	Votes	%	±%
Conservative	Simon Harwood	945	35.3%	−4.4
Liberal Democrats	Michael John Lott	757	28.3%	−10.1
UKIP	Jim Groves	395	14.8%	+14.8
Labour	Min Birdsey	366	13.7%	+0.5
Green	Heida Shona Mollart-Griffin	198	7.4%	−0.8
Turnout		2,677	43.2%	
Conservative gain from Liberal Democrats		Swing	+2.9	

Hitchin Oughton ward
Party	Candidate	Votes	%	±%
Labour	Frank Radcliffe*	450	39.5%	−8.5
UKIP	Stephen Joseph Bartlett	278	24.4%	+4.7
Conservative	Mara MacSeoinin	252	22.1%	−1.8
Green	George Winston Howe	89	7.8%	+3.6
Liberal Democrats	John Stephen White	55	4.8%	+0.7
Turnout		1,140	31%	
Labour hold		Swing	-6.6	

Hitchin Priory ward
Party	Candidate	Votes	%	±%
Conservative	Allison Ashley*	785	48.8%	−0.3
UKIP	Adrianne Fairfax Smyth	266	16.5%	+0.5
Labour	June Le Sueur	222	13.8%	−2.3
Green	Gillian Langley	184	11.4%	+3.2
Liberal Democrats	Stuart Gideon Alder	147	9.1%	−1.2
Turnout		1,609	43.8%	
Conservative hold		Swing	-0.4	

Hitchin Walsworth ward
Party	Candidate	Votes	%	±%
Conservative	Alan Millard*	792	33.7%	−5.2
Labour	Nafisa Sayany	698	29.7%	−9.0
UKIP	Raymond John Parsons	352	15%	+15.0
Green	Gavin Nicholson	349	14.8%	−0.5
Liberal Democrats	Andrew Ircha	154	6.6%	0.0
Turnout		2,351	38.3%	
Conservative hold		Swing	+1.9	

Hitchwood, Offa and Hoo ward, held 10 July 2014
Party	Candidate	Votes	%	±%
Conservative	Faye Barnard*	734	62.0%	+5.5
UKIP	Colin John Rafferty	203	17.1%	+1.3
Labour	Simon Watson	116	9.8%	−4.0
Green	Orla Nicholls	74	6.3%	+1.0
Liberal Democrats	Peter Donald Johnson	57	4.8%	−3.2
Turnout		1,184	21.1%	
Conservative hold		Swing	+2.1	

The election in Hitchwood, Offa and Hoo ward was delayed due to the death of one of the original candidates.

Kimpton ward
Party	Candidate	Votes	%	±%
Conservative	John Bishop*	417	65.4%	+2.1
Green	Orla Nicholls	123	19.3%	+16.1
Labour	Sadie Laura Billing	92	14.4%	+5.5
Turnout		638	36.8%	
Conservative hold		Swing	-7.0	

Knebworth ward
Party	Candidate	Votes	%	±%
Conservative	Steve Hemingway	944	57.1%	−0.3
UKIP	James Alan Orme-Kirby	297	18.0%	+6.6
Labour	Gary Hills	226	13.7%	−5.8
Green	Harold Bland	172	10.4%	−0.6
Turnout		1,654	40.1%	
Conservative hold		Swing	+0.6	

Letchworth East ward
Party	Candidate	Votes	%	±%
Labour	Lorna Kercher*	594	40.7%	+0.5
Conservative	Michael Paterson	387	26.5%	−6.1
UKIP	John Finbarr Barry	301	20.6%	+11.4
Green	Eric Blakeley	168	11.5%	+3.3
Turnout		1,458	32.6%	
Labour hold		Swing	+3.3	

Letchworth Grange ward
Party	Candidate	Votes	%	±%
Labour	Sandra Lunn	700	32.7%	−10.4
Conservative	Paul Marment	640	29.9%	+0.8
UKIP	Andrew Hamilton Scuoler	512	23.9%	+23.9
Green	Rosemary Ann Bland	159	7.4%	−0.4
Liberal Democrats	Martin Geoffrey Penny	115	5.4%	−2.0
Turnout		2,140	37.2%	
Labour gain from Conservative		Swing	-5.6	

Letchworth South East ward
Party	Candidate	Votes	%	±%
Conservative	John Leo Dobson Booth*	769	39%	+0.3
Labour	Martin John Stears-Handscomb	483	24.5%	−5.6
UKIP	Sidney Arthur Start	453	23%	+8.5
Liberal Democrats	Rebecca Carole Greener	126	6.4%	−1.8
Green	Dean Cartwright	125	6.3%	−1.3
Turnout		1,970	34.5%	
Conservative hold		Swing	+2.9	

Letchworth South West ward
Party	Candidate	Votes	%	±%
Conservative	Michael Rice*	1,086	46.1%	−7.7
Labour	Jean Andrews	367	15.6%	−4.2
UKIP	Gemma Hughes	356	15.1%	+15.1
Green	Mario May	274	11.6%	−1.0
Liberal Democrats	John Paul Winder	257	10.9%	−2.5
Turnout		2,357	38.1%	
Conservative hold		Swing	-1.8	

Letchworth Wilbury ward
Party	Candidate	Votes	%	±%
Labour	Gary Grindal*	624	42.3%	+4.6
Conservative	Andy Frankland	497	33.7%	−2.5
UKIP	Michael Richard Rodgers	225	15.2%	+3.7
Green	Maryla Hart	122	8.3%	−2.3
Turnout		1,476	35.1%	
Labour hold		Swing	+3.6	

Royston Heath ward
Party	Candidate	Votes	%	±%
Conservative	Fiona Hill*	827	47.9%	−5.8
UKIP	Pat Albone	331	19.2%	+19.2
Labour	Ken Garland	246	14.2%	−4.8
Green	Phil Oddy	166	9.6%	−2.2
Liberal Democrats	David Robert May	146	8.5%	−5.8
Turnout		1,727	39.8%	
Conservative hold		Swing	-12.5	

Royston Meridian ward
Party	Candidate	Votes	%	±%
Conservative	Bill Davidson*	740	44.8%	−13.5
UKIP	Paula McGlynn	468	28.4%	+28.4
Labour	Amy Bourke	193	11.7%	−6.7
Green	Karen Julie Harmel	134	8.1%	+0.3
Liberal Democrats	John Raymond Ledden	108	6.5%	−7.9
Turnout		1,650	39.9%	
Conservative hold		Swing	-20.9	

Royston Palace ward
Party	Candidate	Votes	%	±%
Conservative	Benjamin Lewis	500	34.2%	−7.9
Labour	Robert Inwood*	382	26.1%	+0.8
UKIP	Mark James Hughes	374	25.6%	+25.6
Liberal Democrats	Gerald Jackson	106	7.3%	−15.7
Green	Peter Groves	92	6.3%	−1.7
Turnout		1,461	35.1%	
Conservative gain from Labour		Swing	-4.3	

Robert Inwood had been elected as a Liberal Democrat in 2010, but had defected to Labour in 2012.
