= 2008 North Hertfordshire District Council election =

Council election in England

← 2007	1 May 2008	2010 →

15 of 49 seats on North Hertfordshire District Council 25 seats needed for a majority
	First party	Second party	Third party
	Con	LD	Lab
Leader	F. John Smith	Steve Jarvis	David Kearns
Party	Conservative	Liberal Democrats	Labour
Seats before	30	9	10
Seats after	32	9	8
Seat change	▲2	Steady	▼2
Popular vote	13,576	5,308	5,634
Percentage	49.6%	19.4%	20.6%
- Results of the 2008 North Hertfordshire District Council election
Leader before election
F. John Smith
Conservative
Leader after election
F. John Smith
Conservative

The 2008 North Hertfordshire Council election was held on 1 May 2008, at the same time as other local elections across England and Wales. Of the 49 seats on North Hertfordshire District Council, 15 were up for election.

Only two seats changed party at the election, both of which were won by the Conservatives from Labour. The Conservatives therefore increased their majority on the council and their leader, F. John Smith, remained leader of the council. Whilst Labour's share of the vote increased, they were overtaken in seat numbers by the Liberal Democrats, who became the second largest party on the council. Prior to the election Labour was led by David Kearns, who was replaced after the election by Martin Stears.

== Overall results ==
The overall results were as follows:

2008 North Hertfordshire District Council election
Party	This election			Full council			This election		
Party	Seats	Net	Seats %	Other	Total	Total %	Votes	Votes %	+/−
Conservative	10	▲2	66.7	22	32	65.3	13,576	49.6	+2.6
Labour	2	▼2	13.3	6	8	16.3	5,634	20.6	+2.1
Liberal Democrats	3	Steady	20.0	6	9	18.4	5,308	19.4	-6.3
Green	0	Steady	0.0	0	0	0.0	2,065	7.5	+0.1
BNP	0	Steady	0.0	0	0	0.0	408	1.5	n/a
UKIP	0	Steady	0.0	0	0	0.0	351	1.3	+0.4
Independent	0	Steady	0.0	0	0	0.0	21	0.1	-0.4

== Ward results ==
The results for each ward were as follows. Where the previous incumbent was standing for re-election they are marked with an asterisk(*).

Baldock East ward
Party	Candidate	Votes	%	±%
Liberal Democrats	Marilyn Roberta Kirkland*	535	51.8%	−1.8
Conservative	June Smith	459	44.5%	−1.6
Green	Karen Julie Harmel	37	3.6%	n/a
Turnout		1,032	47.1%	
Liberal Democrats hold		Swing	-0.1	

Baldock Town ward
Party	Candidate	Votes	%	±%
Conservative	Michael Edwin Weeks*	1,148	61.4%	−0.8
Liberal Democrats	Robert Alan Young	317	16.9%	−5.1
Labour	Debbie Tara Hicks	302	16.1%	−3.9
Green	Sarah Elaine Pond	96	5.1%	n/a
Turnout		1,871	34.2%	
Conservative hold		Swing	+1.9	

Chesfield ward
Party	Candidate	Votes	%	±%
Liberal Democrats	Lee Downie*	746	43.6%	−16.0
Conservative	Emma Denise Pelling	700	40.9%	+1.7
Labour	Bhavna Joshi	212	12.4%	n/a
Green	Ann Karen De Bock	50	2.9%	n/a
Turnout		1,711	37.6%	
Liberal Democrats hold		Swing	-8.9	

Hitchin Bearton ward
Party	Candidate	Votes	%	±%
Labour	Deepak Singh Sangha*	748	36.5%	−7.3
Conservative	Charles Spencer Bunker	700	34.2%	+7.6
Liberal Democrats	Linda Helen Maynard	302	14.7%	+1.2
Green	Mark Ashley Walker	284	13.9%	−5.0
Turnout		2,048	34.2%	
Labour hold		Swing	-7.5	

Hitchin Highbury ward
Party	Candidate	Votes	%	±%
Liberal Democrats	Clare Louise Body*	1,186	47.3%	−8.3
Conservative	Mark Hanson	1,056	42.1%	+2.0
Labour	Mark Francis Crawley	141	5.6%	−1.4
Green	Robert John Mardon	118	4.7%	−5.6
Turnout		2,508	43.3%	
Liberal Democrats hold		Swing	-5.2	

Hitchin Oughton ward
Party	Candidate	Votes	%	±%
Labour	Joan Irene Kirby*	640	50.8%	−2.7
Conservative	Stephen Parker	410	32.6%	+5.5
Liberal Democrats	Ron Clark	108	8.6%	−1.7
Green	George Howe	99	7.9%	−2.0
Turnout		1,259	33.6%	
Labour hold		Swing	-4.1	

Hitchin Priory ward
Party	Candidate	Votes	%	±%
Conservative	Richard Arthur Charles Thake*	954	63.4%	+0.9
Liberal Democrats	Lisa Victoria Courts	262	17.4%	−2.8
Green	Christopher James Honey	148	9.8%	−3.5
Labour	Araminta Jane Birdsey	138	9.2%	−0.5
Turnout		1,504	42.6%	
Conservative hold		Swing	+1.9	

Hitchin Walsworth ward
Party	Candidate	Votes	%	±%
Conservative	Raymond Lawrence Shakespeare-Smith*	995	42.7%	−0.6
Labour	Ryan Ottis Johnson	660	28.4%	−5.4
Green	Giles Colin Woodruff	418	18.0%	−11.2
Liberal Democrats	Andrew Darley	249	10.7%	−5.8
Turnout		2,328	39.1%	
Conservative hold		Swing	+3.0	

Hitchwood, Offa and Hoo ward
Party	Candidate	Votes	%	±%
Conservative	Claire Patricia Annette Strong*	1,705	72.9%	+6.5
Liberal Democrats	Peter Donald Johnson	243	10.4%	−10.4
Labour	Clare Helen Billing	226	9.7%	−6.5
Green	Harold Bland	160	6.8%	−13.3
Turnout		2,340	41.9%	
Conservative hold		Swing	+8.5	

Knebworth ward
Party	Candidate	Votes	%	±%
Conservative	Alan Bardett*	1,071	70.1%	+4.0
Labour	John Brian Burnell	241	15.8%	+0.3
Liberal Democrats	John Winder	113	7.4%	−12.4
Green	William Nicholas Huggonson Berrington	94	6.2%	−6.0
Turnout		1,528	37.9%	
Conservative hold		Swing	+1.8	

Letchworth East ward
Party	Candidate	Votes	%	±%
Conservative	Michael Paterson	519	37.3%	+0.8
Labour	Arthur Jarman*	508	36.5%	−7.4
Liberal Democrats	Rebecca Carole Greener	129	9.3%	−6.9
Green	Eric Morris Blakeley	92	6.6%	n/a
BNP	Thomas Godfrey	89	6.4%	n/a
UKIP	Julie Dawn Savage	44	3.2%	n/a
Turnout		1,391	35.9%	
Conservative gain from Labour		Swing	+4.1	

Letchworth Grange ward
Party	Candidate	Votes	%	±%
Conservative	Paul Anthony James Marment	808	36.9%	−6.3
Labour	Jean Andrews	727	33.2%	−10.3
Liberal Democrats	Martin Geoffrey Penny	237	10.8%	−5.2
BNP	Barry Gillespie	184	8.4%	n/a
UKIP	Susan Anne Mary Keeler	135	6.2%	n/a
Green	Luke Jack Alfred Gouldstone	95	4.3%	n/a
Turnout		2,192	38.4%	
Conservative hold		Swing	+2.0	

Letchworth South East ward
Party	Candidate	Votes	%	±%
Conservative	David Charles Levett*	1,084	53.6%	+6.8
Labour	Nicholas Frederick Henry Kissen	376	18.6%	−4.1
Liberal Democrats	Julia Winter	295	14.6%	−7.1
UKIP	John Finbarr Barry	172	8.5%	−9.1
Green	Heidi Shona Mollart-Griffin	83	4.1%	n/a
Turnout		2,022	35.4%	
Conservative hold		Swing	+5.5	

Letchworth South West ward
Party	Candidate	Votes	%	±%
Conservative	Terence William Hone*	1,465	61.2%	+0.5
Liberal Democrats	John Paul Winder	464	19.4%	−4.1
Labour	Headley Valentine Parkins	240	10.0%	−1.1
Green	Jonathan Guy Hart	215	9.0%	−1.4
Turnout		2,393	40.5%	
Conservative hold		Swing	+2.3	

Letchworth Wilbury ward
Party	Candidate	Votes	%	±%
Conservative	Elliot Needham	502	37.6%	−4.5
Labour	Ian Mantle*	475	35.6%	−10.2
BNP	Reginald Frank Norgan	135	10.1%	n/a
Liberal Democrats	John Stephen White	122	9.1%	−14.6
Green	Susan Elizabeth Dye	78	5.8%	n/a
Independent	Jiten Bardwaj	21	1.6%	n/a
Turnout		1,334	33.2%	
Conservative gain from Labour		Swing	+2.9	
