= 2016 North Hertfordshire District Council election =

2016 UK local government election

← 2015	5 May 2016	2018 →

15 of 49 seats on North Hertfordshire District Council 25 seats needed for a majority
	First party	Second party	Third party
	Con	Lab	LD
Leader	Lynda Needham	Frank Radcliffe	Steve Jarvis
Party	Conservative	Labour	Liberal Democrats
Seats before	36	11	2
Seats after	34	12	3
Seat change	▼2	▲1	▲1
Popular vote	10,383	7,087	3,893
Percentage	40.1%	27.3%	15.0%
Leader before election
Lynda Needham
Conservative
Leader after election
Lynda Needham
Conservative

The 2016 North Hertfordshire Council election was held on 5 May 2016, at the same time as other local elections across England. Of the 49 seats on North Hertfordshire District Council, 15 were up for election.

The Conservatives lost two seats, one to Labour and one to the Liberal Democrats, but retained their overall majority on the council.

== Overall results ==
The overall results were as follows:

2016 North Hertfordshire District Council election
Party	This election			Full council			This election		
Party	Seats	Net	Seats %	Other	Total	Total %	Votes	Votes %	+/−
Conservative	7	▼2	46.7	27	34	69.4	10,383	40.1	-7.7
Labour	6	▲1	40.0	6	12	24.5	7,087	27.3	+5.5
Liberal Democrats	2	▲1	13.3	1	3	6.1	3,893	15.0	+3.5
Green	0	Steady	0.0	0	0	0.0	2,224	8.6	-0.9
UKIP	0	Steady	0.0	0	0	0.0	2,035	7.9	-1.6
Independent	0	Steady	0.0	0	0	0.0	291	1.1	N/A

== Ward results ==
The results for each ward were as follows. Where the previous incumbent was standing for re-election they are marked with an asterisk (*).

Baldock East ward
Party	Candidate	Votes	%	±%
Conservative	Valentine Shanley	471	45.9%	−1.0
Liberal Democrats	Richard William Winter	272	26.5%	−12.2
Labour	Gillian Anne Tyler	121	11.8%	+3.3
UKIP	Brian George Alderton	109	10.6%	+10.6
Green	Jane Louise Turner	48	4.7%	−0.7
Turnout		1,027	45.2%	
Conservative hold		Swing	+5.6	

Baldock Town ward
Party	Candidate	Votes	%	±%
Conservative	Michael Edwin Weeks*	896	48.7%	−6.2
Labour	Geraldine Dobson	377	20.5%	+0.2
UKIP	Brian Cyril Munnery	251	13.6%	−0.4
Green	Emily Charlotte Beswarick	169	9.2%	−1.4
Liberal Democrats	Marcus Eric Keighley	138	7.5%	+7.5
Turnout		1,841	31.7%	
Conservative hold		Swing	-3.2	

Chesfield ward
Party	Candidate	Votes	%	±%
Liberal Democrats	Terry Tyler	668	42.3%	+26.4
Conservative	James Terence Henry	545	34.5%	−12.8
Labour	John Hayes	266	16.8%	−1.4
Green	Felicity Ann Power	93	5.9%	+1.7
Turnout		1,581	30.6%	
Liberal Democrats hold		Swing	+19.6	

Hitchin Bearton ward
Party	Candidate	Votes	%	±%
Labour	Ian Clive Albert	1,036	48.1%	+5.3
Conservative	Serena Farrow	580	26.9%	−2.9
Liberal Democrats	Stuart Alder	272	12.6%	+2.1
Green	William Barry Lavin	243	11.3%	+1.1
Turnout		2,154	33.9%	
Labour hold		Swing	+4.1	

Hitchin Highbury ward
Party	Candidate	Votes	%	±%
Liberal Democrats	Paul Clark	1,144	44.8%	+14.0
Conservative	David Leal-Bennett*	836	32.7%	−6.4
Labour	Martin Burke	401	15.7%	+0.7
Green	Rosamund Brigid McGuire	151	5.9%	−1.2
Turnout		2,556	41.2%	
Liberal Democrats gain from Conservative		Swing	+10.2	

Hitchin Oughton ward
Party	Candidate	Votes	%	±%
Labour	Simon Peter Watson	505	48.8%	+9.4
Conservative	Pauline Anne Scully	328	31.7%	+9.6
Green	George Winston Howe	102	9.9%	+2.1
Liberal Democrats	Louise Peace	89	8.6%	+3.8
Turnout		1,034	28.1%	
Labour hold		Swing	-0.1	

Hitchin Priory ward
Party	Candidate	Votes	%	±%
Conservative	Richard Arthur Charles Thake*	684	44.1%	−4.7
Labour	David James Winstanley	281	18.1%	+4.3
Liberal Democrats	Ewan Wilkie	164	10.6%	+1.4
Independent	Jacqueline Mary McDonald	155	10.0%	+10.0
Green	Des Stephens	142	9.1%	−2.3
UKIP	Allan Newey	119	7.7%	−8.9
Turnout		1,552	42.3%	
Conservative hold		Swing	-4.5	

Hitchin Walsworth ward
Party	Candidate	Votes	%	±%
Labour	Elizabeth Dennis	806	38.5%	+7.5
Conservative	Ray Shakespeare-Smith*	668	31.9%	−8.0
Green	Richard Alexander Cano	278	13.3%	+0.9
UKIP	Peter Croft	193	9.2%	+0.2
Liberal Democrats	Andrew Ircha	133	6.4%	−0.9
Turnout		2,091	34.6%	
Labour gain from Conservative		Swing	-8.2	

Hitchwood, Offa and Hoo ward
Party	Candidate	Votes	%	±%
Conservative	Claire Patricia Annette Strong*	1,157	55.8%	−2.2
UKIP	Gary John Jones	262	12.6%	0.0
Labour	David Liam O'Brien	251	12.1%	−0.7
Liberal Democrats	Peter Johnson	212	10.2%	+2.2
Green	Alex Longmore	186	9.0%	+0.7
Turnout		2,074	36.5%	
Conservative hold		Swing	-1.1	

Knebworth ward
Party	Candidate	Votes	%	±%
Conservative	Stephen J. Deakin-Davies	904	62.4%	+5.4
Labour	Ed Smith	310	21.4%	+7.7
Liberal Democrats	Charlie Wilson	142	9.8%	+9.8
Green	Claire Helen Taylor	81	5.6%	−4.8
Turnout		1,448	36.4%	
Conservative hold		Swing	-1.2	

Letchworth East ward
Party	Candidate	Votes	%	±%
Labour	Ian Mantle*	505	38.3%	−2.5
Conservative	David Peter John Wakelin	347	26.3%	−0.2
Independent	Paul Ross	136	10.3%	+10.3
Green	Rosemary Bland	126	9.6%	−2.0
UKIP	Mark James Hughes	111	8.4%	−12.2
Liberal Democrats	Jane Fae	86	6.5%	+6.5
Turnout		1,319	29.9%	
Labour hold		Swing	-1.1	

Letchworth Grange ward
Party	Candidate	Votes	%	±%
Labour	Clare Billing*	685	34.9%	+1.7
Conservative	Matthew Berman	654	33.3%	−7.1
UKIP	Tyler James Davis	334	17.0%	+4.6
Liberal Democrats	Martin Geoffrey Penny	153	7.8%	+1.9
Green	Elizabeth Susan Hancock	125	6.4%	−1.4
Turnout		1,963	34.9%	
Labour hold		Swing	+4.4	

Letchworth South East ward
Party	Candidate	Votes	%	±%
Conservative	David Charles Levett*	737	38.7%	−7.2
Labour	Martin Stears-Handscomb	609	32.0%	+0.1
UKIP	Sidney Arthur Start	309	16.2%	+1.9
Liberal Democrats	Barry Peter Neale	134	7.0%	+7.0
Green	Dean Lee Cartwright	99	5.2%	−2.0
Turnout		1,902	34.2%	
Conservative hold		Swing	-3.7	

Letchworth South West ward
Party	Candidate	Votes	%	±%
Conservative	Terry Hone*	1,096	48.8%	+0.2
Labour	Jean Andrews	441	19.6%	+1.9
Green	Mario May	212	9.4%	−3.3
UKIP	Gemma Margaret Rosina Hughes	198	8.8%	−1.0
Liberal Democrats	Ursula Winder	86	3.8%	−6.6
Turnout		2,246	36.5%	
Conservative hold		Swing	-0.9	

Letchworth Wilbury ward
Party	Candidate	Votes	%	±%
Labour	Deepak Sangha*	493	38.1%	−4.2
Conservative	Andy Frankland	480	37.1%	+3.4
Green	Maryla Josephine Hart	169	13.1%	+4.8
UKIP	Andrew Scuoler	149	11.5%	−3.7
Turnout		1,295	32.1%	
Labour hold		Swing	-3.8	

== Changes 2016–2018 ==
A by-election was held in Hitchin Oughton ward on 10 November 2016 following the resignation of Labour councillor Simon Watson. Labour retained the seat.

Hitchin Oughton ward by-election, 10 November 2016
Party	Candidate	Votes	%	±%
Labour	Martin Stears-Handscomb	258	31.9%	−17.0
Independent	Jackie McDonald	200	24.7%	+24.7
Conservative	Serena Elizabeth Farrow	158	19.5%	−12.2
Liberal Democrats	Louise Peace	150	18.5%	+9.9
Green	George Winston Howe	42	5.2%	−4.7
Turnout		810		
Labour hold		Swing	-20.8	

Two by-elections were held on 4 May 2017, at the same time as the 2017 Hertfordshire County Council election. The by-election in Royston Heath ward was triggered by the death of Conservative councillor Peter Burt. The by-election in Hitchin Priory ward was triggered by the resignation of Conservative councillor Allison Ashley. The Conservatives retained both seats.

Hitchin Priory ward by-election, 4 May 2017
Party	Candidate	Votes	%	±%
Conservative	Raymond Shakespeare-Smith	717	41.5%	−2.6
Liberal Democrats	John Hefford	394	22.8%	+12.2
Independent	Jacqueline McDonald	277	16.0%	+6.1
Labour	Dave Winstanley	219	12.7%	−5.4
Green	Des Stephens	114	6.6%	−2.5
Turnout		1,727	46.4%	
Conservative hold		Swing	-7.4	

Royston Heath ward by-election, 4 May 2017
Party	Candidate	Votes	%	±%
Conservative	Sarah Dingley	844	50.2%	−0.6
Liberal Democrats	Carol Stanier	470	28.0%	+14.6
Labour	Vaughan West	196	11.7%	−4.6
Green	Katherine Shann	97	5.8%	−1.3
UKIP	Christopher Arquati	68	4.0%	−8.0
Turnout		1,680	39.0%	
Conservative hold		Swing	-7.6	
