= 2010 North Hertfordshire District Council election =

Council election in England

← 2008	6 May 2010	2011 →

19 of 49 seats on North Hertfordshire District Council 25 seats needed for a majority
	First party	Second party	Third party
	Con	LD	Lab
Leader	F. John Smith	Steve Jarvis	Martin Stears-Handscomb
Party	Conservative	Liberal Democrats	Labour
Seats before	32	9	8
Seats after	33	9	7
Seat change	▲1	Steady	▼1
Popular vote	26,492	13,910	11,613
Percentage	46.8%	24.6%	20.5%
- Results of the 2010 North Hertfordshire District Council election
Leader before election
F. John Smith
Conservative
Leader after election
Lynda Needham
Conservative

The 2010 North Hertfordshire Council election was held on 6 May 2010, at the same time as other local elections across England and the general election. Of the 49 seats on North Hertfordshire District Council, 19 were up for election, being the usual third of seats plus a by-election in Royston Palace ward.

The Conservatives gained one of the Royston Palace seats from the Liberal Democrats, whilst the Liberal Democrats gained Hitchin Bearton from the Labour leader, Martin Stears-Handscomb. The Conservatives therefore increased their majority on the council. The Conservative leader prior to the election was F. John Smith, who had been leader of the council since 1999. He did not stand for re-election. After the election, Lynda Needham was appointed Conservative leader and leader of the council. Labour's new leader after the election was David Billing.

== Overall results ==
The overall results were as follows:

2010 North Hertfordshire District Council election
Party	This election			Full council			This election		
Party	Seats	Net	Seats %	Other	Total	Total %	Votes	Votes %	+/−
Conservative	10	▲1	68.4	23	33	67.3	26,492	46.8	-2.8
Liberal Democrats	3	Steady	15.8	6	9	18.4	13,910	24.6	+5.2
Labour	3	▼1	13.3	4	7	15.8	11,613	20.5	-0.1
Green	0	Steady	0.0	0	0	0.0	3,639	6.4	-1.1
UKIP	0	Steady	0.0	0	0	0.0	499	0.9	-0.4
BNP	0	Steady	0.0	0	0	0.0	435	0.8	-0.7

== Ward results ==
The results for each ward were as follows. Where the previous incumbent was standing for re-election they are marked with an asterisk (*).

Baldock Town ward
Party	Candidate	Votes	%	±%
Conservative	Ian Jeremy Knighton*	1,981	54.1%	−7.3
Liberal Democrats	Richard William Winter	835	22.8%	+5.9
Labour	Kenneth Garland	552	15.1%	−1.0
BNP	James Reginald Scott	140	3.8%	n/a
Green	Sarah Elaine Pond	139	3.8%	−1.3
Turnout		3,660	65.3%	
Conservative hold		Swing	-6.6	

Codicote ward
Party	Candidate	Votes	%	±%
Conservative	Thomas Henry Brindley* (Tom Brindley)	972	61.0%	+2.7
Liberal Democrats	Elizabeth Anne Willoughby (Liz Willoughby)	281	17.6%	n/a
Labour	Jonathan Holman	219	13.7%	0.0
Green	Harold Bland	117	7.3%	+0.7
Turnout		1,594	75.2%	
Conservative hold		Swing	n/a	

Hitchin Bearton ward
Party	Candidate	Votes	%	±%
Liberal Democrats	Lisa Victoria Courts	1,337	32.2%	+17.5
Conservative	Stephen Parker	1,332	32.1%	−2.1
Labour	Martin John Stears-Handscomb*	1,138	27.4%	−9.1
Green	Jerome James Green	321	7.7%	−6.2
Turnout		4,152	67.8%	
Liberal Democrats gain from Labour		Swing	+13.3	

Hitchin Highbury ward
Party	Candidate	Votes	%	±%
Liberal Democrats	Lawrence William Oliver*	1,889	42.9%	−4.4
Conservative	David Leal-Bennett	1,779	40.4%	−1.7
Labour	Araminta Jane Birdsey (Min Birdsey)	480	10.9%	+5.3
Green	Robert John Mardon (Bob Mardon)	236	5.4%	+0.7
Turnout		4,402	73.5%	
Liberal Democrats hold		Swing	-1.4	

Hitchin Oughton ward
Party	Candidate	Votes	%	±%
Labour	David Edward Billing*	888	38.7%	−12.1
Conservative	Louise Alexandra Huggins	795	34.6%	+2.0
Liberal Democrats	Robin Lambie	461	20.1%	+11.5
Green	Mark Ashley Walker (Ashley Walker)	138	6.0%	−1.9
Turnout		2,296	60.7%	
Labour hold		Swing	-7.1	

Hitchin Priory ward
Party	Candidate	Votes	%	±%
Conservative	Allison Ashley*	1,599	56.6%	−6.8
Liberal Democrats	Michael John Lott	797	28.2%	+10.8
Labour	Deborah Vincenza Bruna Segalini	243	8.6%	−0.6
Green	Paul Anthony O'Shaughnessy	169	6.0%	−3.8
Turnout		2,823	77.7%	
Conservative hold		Swing	-8.8	

Hitchin Walsworth ward
Party	Candidate	Votes	%	±%
Conservative	Alan John Millard*	1,714	40.6%	−2.1
Liberal Democrats	Andrew Ircha	1,070	25.3%	+14.6
Labour	Derek Nigel Sheard	1,015	24.0%	−4.4
Green	Richard Lionel Wise	405	9.6%	−1.1
Turnout		4,226	69.4%	
Conservative hold		Swing	-8.4	

Hitchwood, Offa and Hoo ward
Party	Candidate	Votes	%	±%
Conservative	David Miller*	2,591	61.6%	−11.3
Liberal Democrats	Peter Donald Johnson	821	19.5%	+9.1
Labour	Clare Helen Billing	522	12.4%	+2.7
Green	Christopher James Honey (Chris Honey)	251	6.0%	−0.8
Turnout		4,207	75.0%	
Conservative hold		Swing	-10.2	

Kimpton ward
Party	Candidate	Votes	%	±%
Conservative	John Cyril Bishop*	834	63.3%	−9.4
Liberal Democrats	William Richard Webster	323	24.5%	+6.7
Labour	Alison Clare Casey	117	8.9%	−0.3
Green	George Winston Howe	42	3.2%	n/a
Turnout		1,318	74.3%	
Conservative hold		Swing	-8.1	

Knebworth ward
Party	Candidate	Votes	%	±%
Conservative	Jane Elizabeth Gray*	1,854	61.7%	−8.4
Liberal Democrats	Edward Charles Barham	508	16.9%	+9.5
Labour	John Brian Burnell	502	16.7%	+0.9
Green	Giles Colin Woodruff	127	4.2%	−2.0
Turnout		3,003	71.8%	
Conservative hold		Swing	-9.0	

Letchworth East ward
Party	Candidate	Votes	%	±%
Labour	Lorna Rose Kercher*	968	39.0%	+2.5
Conservative	Blake Stephenson	915	36.9%	−0.4
Green	James Alexander Drew	331	13.4%	+6.8
UKIP	Susan Anne Mary Keeler	237	9.6%	+6.4
Turnout		2,479	60.2%	
Labour hold		Swing	+1.5	

Letchworth Grange ward
Party	Candidate	Votes	%	±%
Conservative	David Chambers	1,558	40.2%	+3.3
Labour	Peter Anthony Mardell	1,147	29.6%	−3.6
Liberal Democrats	John Stephen White	772	19.9%	+9.1
Green	Rosemary Anne Bland	200	5.2%	+0.9
BNP	Thomas William Godfrey	176	4.5%	−3.9
Turnout		3,874	67.2%	
Conservative hold		Swing	+3.5	

Letchworth South East ward
Party	Candidate	Votes	%	±%
Conservative	John Leo Dobson Booth*	1,531	41.3%	−12.3
Labour	Nigel Edward Agar	969	26.1%	+7.5
Liberal Democrats	Margaret Anne Higbid	806	21.7%	+7.1
UKIP	John Finbarr Barry	262	7.1%	−1.4
Green	Eric Morris Blakeley	125	3.4%	−0.7
Turnout		3,711	65.3%	
Conservative hold		Swing	-9.9	

Letchworth South West ward
Party	Candidate	Votes	%	±%
Conservative	Michael John Rice (Mike Rice)	2,026	47.6%	−13.6
Liberal Democrats	John Paul Winder	1,301	30.6%	+11.2
Labour	Paul David Burgin	628	14.8%	+4.8
Green	Jonathan Guy Hart (Jon Hart)	279	6.6%	−2.4
Turnout		4,252	71.3%	
Conservative hold		Swing	-12.4	

Letchworth Wilbury ward
Party	Candidate	Votes	%	±%
Labour	Gary Grindal*	1,174	47.2%	+11.6
Conservative	Pradeep Sharma (Paul Sharma)	855	34.4%	−3.2
Green	Ann Karen De Bock	303	12.2%	+6.4
BNP	Reginald Frank Norgan	119	4.8%	−5.3
Turnout		2,488	62%	
Labour hold		Swing	+7.4	

Royston Heath ward
Party	Candidate	Votes	%	±%
Conservative	Fiona Ronan Greenwood Hill*	1,586	54.4%	+2.3
Liberal Democrats	David Robert May	850	29.1%	−6.7
Labour	Robin Anthony King	331	11.3%	−1.7
Green	Philip John Oddy (Phil Oddy)	133	4.6%	n/a
Turnout		2,918	70.3%	
Conservative hold		Swing	+4.5	

Royston Meridian ward
Party	Candidate	Votes	%	±%
Conservative	William Marr Davidson (Bill Davidson)	1,627	54.8%	−3.1
Liberal Democrats	Lisa Thompson	757	25.5%	+2.6
Labour	Carlo James Zambonini	394	13.3%	+0.7
Green	Karen Julie Harmel	172	5.8%	−12.5
Turnout		2,969	71.4%	
Conservative hold		Swing	-2.4	

Royston Palace ward
Party	Candidate	Votes	%	±%
Liberal Democrats	Robert Edward Inwood*	1,102	42.7%	−7.0
Conservative	Paul Antony Grimes	943	36.5%	−6.3
Conservative	Robert David Smith	904	35.0%	
Liberal Democrats	John Raymond Ledden	849	32.9%	
Labour	Vaughan West	326	12.6%	+2.8
Labour	Leslie Baker (Les Baker)	203	7.9%	
Green	Peter Groves	151	5.8%	n/a
Green	Matthew Philip King (Matt King)	149	5.8%	
Turnout		2,582	64%	
Liberal Democrats hold		Swing		
Conservative gain from Liberal Democrats		Swing		

The by-election in Royston Palace ward was due to the resignation of Liberal Democrat councillor Liz Beardwell.
