= 2012 North Hertfordshire District Council election =

2012 UK local government election

| ← 2011 | 3 May 2012 | 2014 → |

15 of 49 seats on North Hertfordshire District Council 25 seats needed for a majority
| | First party | Second party | Third party |
|---|---|---|---|
| | Con | Lab | LD |
| Leader | Lynda Needham | David Billing | Steve Jarvis |
| Party | Conservative | Labour | Liberal Democrats |
| Seats before | 34 | 7 | 8 |
| Seats after | 33 | 10 | 6 |
| Seat change | ▼1 | ▲3 | ▼2 |
| Popular vote | 9,972 | 6,729 | 3,386 |
| Percentage | 42.4% | 28.6% | 14.4% |
- Results of the 2012 North Hertfordshire District Council election
Leader before election
Lynda Needham
Conservative
Leader after election
Lynda Needham
Conservative

The 2012 North Hertfordshire Council election was held on 3 May 2012, at the same time as other local elections across England, Scotland and Wales. Of the 49 seats on North Hertfordshire District Council, 15 were up for election.

Labour gained three seats from the Conservatives, whilst the Conservatives gained two seats from the Liberal Democrats. The Conservatives retained overall control of the council, whilst Labour overtook the Liberal Democrats to become the second largest party.

== Overall results ==
The overall results were as follows:

2012 North Hertfordshire District Council election
| Party | This election | | | Full council | | | This election | | |
| Party | Seats | Net | Seats % | Other | Total | Total % | Votes | Votes % | +/− |
|---|---|---|---|---|---|---|---|---|---|
| Conservative | 9 | ▼1 | 60.0 | 24 | 33 | 67.3 | 9,972 | 42.4 | -6.0 |
| Labour | 5 | ▲3 | 33.3 | 5 | 10 | 20.4 | 6,729 | 28.6 | +5.7 |
| Liberal Democrats | 1 | ▼2 | 6.7 | 5 | 6 | 12.2 | 3,386 | 14.4 | -3.2 |
| Green | 0 | Steady | 0.0 | 0 | 0 | 0.0 | 2,341 | 10.0 | +1.8 |
| UKIP | 0 | Steady | 0.0 | 0 | 0 | 0.0 | 850 | 3.6 | +1.7 |
| English Democrat | 0 | Steady | 0.0 | 0 | 0 | 0.0 | 238 | 1.0 | +0.8 |

== Ward results ==
The results for each ward were as follows. Where the previous incumbent was standing for re-election they are marked with an asterisk(*). A double dagger (‡) indicates a sitting councillor contesting a different ward.

Baldock East
| Party | Candidate | Votes | % | ±% |
|---|---|---|---|---|
| Conservative | John Harris | 475 | 46.8 | +2.3 |
| Liberal Democrats | Marilyn Kirkland* | 392 | 38.7 | −13.1 |
| Labour | Vaughan West | 86 | 8.5 | n/a |
| Green | Sylvia Hutchinson | 54 | 5.3 | +1.7 |
| Majority | | 83 | 8.2 | |
| Turnout | | 1,014 | 45.19 | |
| Conservative gain from Liberal Democrats | | Swing | +7.8 | |

Baldock Town
| Party | Candidate | Votes | % | ±% |
|---|---|---|---|---|
| Conservative | Michael Edwin Weeks* | 828 | 54.7 | −3.3 |
| Labour | Ken Garland | 308 | 20.3 | −2.3 |
| Green | Arwen Jane Tapping | 221 | 14.6 | +5.5 |
| Liberal Democrats | Richard Winter | 147 | 9.7 | +0.5 |
| Majority | | 520 | 34.3 | |
| Turnout | | 1,514 | 26.1 | |
| Conservative hold | | Swing | -0.5 | |

Chesfield
| Party | Candidate | Votes | % | ±% |
|---|---|---|---|---|
| Liberal Democrats | Sally Margaret Jarvis | 685 | 43.9 | +9.0 |
| Conservative | James Henry | 534 | 34.2 | −7.3 |
| Labour | Bhavna Joshi | 280 | 17.9 | −0.5 |
| Green | Felicity Ann Power | 59 | 3.8 | −0.8 |
| Majority | | 151 | 9.7 | |
| Turnout | | 1,562 | 29.9 | |
| Liberal Democrats hold | | Swing | +8.2 | |

Hitchin Bearton
| Party | Candidate | Votes | % | ±% |
|---|---|---|---|---|
| Labour | Deborah Segalini | 1,041 | 52.7 | +2.4 |
| Conservative | Alex Stoner | 536 | 27.1 | −3.5 |
| Green | Gavin Nicholson | 216 | 10.9 | +2.4 |
| Liberal Democrats | Michael John Lott | 175 | 8.9 | −1.0 |
| Majority | | 505 | 25.6 | |
| Turnout | | 1,976 | 31.7 | |
| Labour hold | | Swing | +3.0 | |

Hitchin Highbury
| Party | Candidate | Votes | % | ±% |
|---|---|---|---|---|
| Conservative | David Leal-Bennett | 906 | 39.7 | +5.1 |
| Liberal Democrats | Clare Body* | 877 | 38.4 | −1.4 |
| Labour | Peter Anthony Mardell | 301 | 13.2 | +2.3 |
| Green | Jackie Greatorex | 187 | 8.2 | +2.4 |
| Majority | | 29 | 1.3 | |
| Turnout | | 2,283 | 37.9 | |
| Conservative gain from Liberal Democrats | | Swing | +3.3 | |

Hitchin Oughton
| Party | Candidate | Votes | % | ±% |
|---|---|---|---|---|
| Labour | Joan Irene Kirby* | 638 | 60.4 | +21.7 |
| Conservative | Faye Barnard | 258 | 24.4 | −10.2 |
| Green | Alan Brookman | 103 | 9.8 | +3.7 |
| Liberal Democrats | Rob Lambie | 50 | 4.7 | −15.3 |
| Majority | | 380 | 36.0 | |
| Turnout | | 1,056 | 29.3 | |
| Labour hold | | Swing | +16.0 | |

Hitchin Priory
| Party | Candidate | Votes | % | ±% |
|---|---|---|---|---|
| Conservative | Richard Thake* | 696 | 49.0 | −7.6 |
| Labour | Nafisa Sayany | 228 | 16.1 | +7.5 |
| UKIP | Adrianne Smyth | 228 | 16.1 | n/a |
| Liberal Democrats | Liz Willoughby | 146 | 10.3 | −17.9 |
| Green | Ann De Bock | 117 | 8.2 | +2.3 |
| Majority | | 468 | 33.0 | |
| Turnout | | 1,419 | 39.6 | |
| Conservative hold | | Swing | -7.5 | |

Hitchin Walsworth
| Party | Candidate | Votes | % | ±% |
|---|---|---|---|---|
| Conservative | Ray Shakespeare-Smith* | 759 | 38.9 | −1.7 |
| Labour | Derek Nigel Sheard | 756 | 38.7 | +8.6 |
| Green | Mario May | 299 | 15.3 | +3.2 |
| Liberal Democrats | Andrew Ircha | 127 | 6.5 | −1.1 |
| Majority | | 3 | 0.2 | |
| Turnout | | 1,952 | 32.1 | |
| Conservative hold | | Swing | -5.2 | |

Hitchwood, Offa & Hoo
| Party | Candidate | Votes | % | ±% |
|---|---|---|---|---|
| Conservative | Claire Patricia Strong* | 1,230 | 63.7 | −2.6 |
| Labour | Louise Helen Chinnery | 325 | 16.8 | +1.4 |
| Green | George Winston Howe | 213 | 11.0 | +3.4 |
| Liberal Democrats | Peter Donald Johnson | 147 | 7.6 | −2.5 |
| Majority | | 905 | 46.9 | |
| Turnout | | 1,931 | 34.6 | |
| Conservative hold | | Swing | -2.0 | |

Knebworth
| Party | Candidate | Votes | % | ±% |
|---|---|---|---|---|
| Conservative | Alan Bardett* | 741 | 57.4 | −4.4 |
| Labour | Jonathan Holman | 251 | 19.4 | +2.7 |
| UKIP | Andrew Scuoler | 147 | 11.4 | n/a |
| Green | Harold Bland | 142 | 11.0 | +6.8 |
| Majority | | 490 | 37.9 | |
| Turnout | | 1,292 | 31.3 | |
| Conservative hold | | Swing | -3.5 | |

Letchworth East
| Party | Candidate | Votes | % | ±% |
|---|---|---|---|---|
| Labour | Ian Mantle | 472 | 40.2 | +1.2 |
| Conservative | Michael Paterson* | 383 | 32.6 | −4.3 |
| UKIP | John Barry | 108 | 9.2 | −0.4 |
| Green | Eric Morris Blakeley | 97 | 8.3 | −5.1 |
| Liberal Democrats | Mertsi Fisher | 73 | 6.2 | n/a |
| English Democrat | Tim Vickers | 36 | 3.1 | n/a |
| Majority | | 89 | 7.6 | |
| Turnout | | 1,174 | 27.6 | |
| Labour gain from Conservative | | Swing | +2.7 | |

Letchworth Grange
| Party | Candidate | Votes | % | ±% |
|---|---|---|---|---|
| Labour | Clare Helen Billing | 721 | 43.1 | +1.4 |
| Conservative | Paul Marment* | 487 | 29.1 | −6.5 |
| English Democrat | Charles Vickers | 202 | 12.1 | +9.3 |
| Green | Rosemary Bland | 131 | 7.8 | +2.2 |
| Liberal Democrats | Martin Geoffrey Penny | 123 | 7.3 | +0.2 |
| Majority | | 234 | 14.0 | |
| Turnout | | 1,674 | 29.1 | |
| Labour gain from Conservative | | Swing | +3.9 | |

Letchworth South East
| Party | Candidate | Votes | % | ±% |
|---|---|---|---|---|
| Conservative | David Charles Levett* | 627 | 38.8 | −9.1 |
| Labour | Nicholas Kissen | 487 | 30.1 | +3.7 |
| UKIP | Philip Martin Stevens | 235 | 14.5 | +5.7 |
| Liberal Democrats | John Winder | 132 | 8.2 | −0.5 |
| Green | James Drew | 124 | 7.7 | +0.5 |
| Majority | | 140 | 8.7 | |
| Turnout | | 1,617 | 28.6 | |
| Conservative hold | | Swing | -6.4 | |

Letchworth South West
| Party | Candidate | Votes | % | ±% |
|---|---|---|---|---|
| Conservative | Terry Hone* | 1,097 | 53.8 | −2.1 |
| Labour | Jean Andrews | 403 | 19.8 | +3.8 |
| Liberal Democrats | John Paul Winder | 274 | 13.4 | −1.0 |
| Green | Rebecca Leek | 257 | 12.6 | −0.4 |
| Majority | | 694 | 34.0 | |
| Turnout | | 2,039 | 34.0 | |
| Conservative hold | | Swing | -3.0 | |

Letchworth Wilbury
| Party | Candidate | Votes | % | ±% |
|---|---|---|---|---|
| Labour | Deepak Singh Sangha ‡ | 432 | 37.7 | −9.5 |
| Conservative | Andy Frankland | 415 | 36.2 | +1.8 |
| UKIP | Michael Rodgers | 132 | 11.5 | n/a |
| Green | Jonathan Guy Hart | 121 | 10.5 | −1.6 |
| Liberal Democrats | John Stephen White | 38 | 3.3 | n/a |
| Majority | | 17 | 1.5 | |
| Turnout | | 1,147 | 27.8 | |
| Labour gain from Conservative | | Swing | -5.7 | |

== Changes 2012–2014 ==
Immediately after the 2012 elections, Robert Inwood, who had been elected as a Liberal Democrat for the Royston Palace ward in 2010, defected to Labour.

Two by-elections were held on 15 November 2012. The by-election in Hitchwood, Offa and Hoo ward was triggered by the death of Conservative councillor David Miller, who had been most recently elected in 2010. The by-election in Letchworth South East ward was triggered by the resignation of Conservative councillor Richard Harman, who had been elected in 2011, after being charged with various offences; he was subsequently convicted of burglary. Neither seat changed party at the resulting by-elections.

Hitchwood, Offa and Hoo ward by-election, 15 November 2012
| Party | Candidate | Votes | % | ±% |
|---|---|---|---|---|
| Conservative | Faye Susan Barnard | 774 | 56.5 | −7.2 |
| UKIP | Peter Robbins | 217 | 15.8 | n/a |
| Labour | Jackie McDonald | 189 | 13.8 | −3.0 |
| Liberal Democrats | Peter Donald Johnson | 110 | 8.0 | +0.4 |
| Green | George Winston Howe | 72 | 5.3 | −5.8 |
| Majority | | 557 | 40.7 | |
| Turnout | | 1,370 | 24.6 | |
| Conservative hold | | Swing | n/a | |

Letchworth South East ward by election, 15 November 2012
| Party | Candidate | Votes | % | ±% |
|---|---|---|---|---|
| Conservative | Julian Michael Cunningham | 761 | 50.9 | +12.1 |
| Labour | Martin Stears-Handscomb | 399 | 26.7 | −3.4 |
| UKIP | John Finbarr Barry | 184 | 12.3 | −2.2 |
| Liberal Democrats | Margaret Anne Higbid | 88 | 5.9 | −2.3 |
| Green | Mario Alexander May | 51 | 3.4 | −4.3 |
| Majority | | 362 | 24.2 | |
| Turnout | | 1,496 | 26.5 | |
| Conservative hold | | Swing | +7.8 | |

A by-election in Hitchin Oughton ward was held on 12 September 2013 following the death of Labour councillor David Billing, who was also the party's leader on the council, and had most recently been elected in 2010. Labour retained the seat.

Hitchin Oughton ward by election, 12 September 2013
| Party | Candidate | Votes | % | ±% |
|---|---|---|---|---|
| Labour | Frank Radcliffe | 361 | 48.0 | −12.4 |
| Conservative | Mara MacSeoinin | 180 | 23.9 | −0.5 |
| UKIP | Peter Croft | 148 | 19.7 | n/a |
| Green | Jacqueline Greatorex | 32 | 4.3 | −5.5 |
| Liberal Democrats | Clare Body | 31 | 4.1 | −0.6 |
| Majority | | 181 | 24.1 | |
| Turnout | | | 20.8 | |
| Labour hold | | Swing | -6.0 | |
