= 2015 North Hertfordshire District Council election =

2015 UK local government election

← 2014	7 May 2015	2016 →

16 of 49 seats on North Hertfordshire District Council 25 seats needed for a majority
	First party	Second party	Third party
	Con	Lab	LD
Leader	Lynda Needham	Judi Billing	Steve Jarvis
Party	Conservative	Labour	Liberal Democrats
Seats before	34	12	3
Seats after	36	11	2
Seat change	▲2	▼1	▼1
Popular vote	24,555	11,191	5,893
Percentage	47.8%	21.8%	11.5%
Leader before election
Lynda Needham
Conservative
Leader after election
Lynda Needham
Conservative

The 2015 North Hertfordshire Council election was held on 7 May 2015, at the same time as other local elections and the general election. Of the 49 seats on North Hertfordshire District Council, 16 were up for election.

The Conservatives increased their majority on the council. They gained two seats, one from Labour and one from the Liberal Democrats. The Conservative leader, Lynda Needham, continued to serve as leader of the council. Shortly after the election, Labour changed its leader from Judi Billing to Frank Radcliffe.

== Overall results ==
The overall results were as follows:

2015 North Hertfordshire District Council election
Party	This election			Full council			This election		
Party	Seats	Net	Seats %	Other	Total	Total %	Votes	Votes %	+/−
Conservative	14	▲2	87.5	22	36	73.5	24,555	47.8	+7.7
Labour	1	▼1	6.3	10	11	22.4	11,191	21.8	-1.6
Liberal Democrats	1	▼1	6.3	1	2	4.1	5,893	11.5	+3.5
Green	0	Steady	0.0	0	0	0.0	4,886	9.5	-0.3
UKIP	0	Steady	0.0	0	0	0.0	4,865	9.5	-9.3

== Ward results ==
The results for each ward were as follows. Where the previous incumbent was standing for re-election they are marked with an asterisk(*).

Arbury ward
Party	Candidate	Votes	%	±%
Conservative	Janine Ann Paterson	1,066	63.9%	+4.4
Green	Jane Louise Smith	214	12.8%	+9.5
Liberal Democrats	Michael John Lott	191	11.5%	−18.6
Labour	Rhona Ann Cameron	174	10.4%	+3.8
Turnout		1,668	80.2%	
Conservative hold		Swing	-2.5	

Baldock Town ward
Party	Candidate	Votes	%	±%
Conservative	Michael Douglas MacKenzie Muir*	2,081	54.8%	+9.2
Labour	Wayne Thornton	768	20.2%	+3.1
UKIP	Brian Munnery	533	14.0%	+14.0
Green	Arwen Jane Tapping	402	10.6%	+2.1
Turnout		3,796	65.0%	
Conservative hold		Swing	+3.1	

Cadwell ward
Party	Candidate	Votes	%	±%
Conservative	Harry Spencer-Smith	770	58.0%	+0.8
Labour	Dave Winstanley	261	19.7%	−5.8
Green	Rosamund Brigid McGuire	141	10.6%	+4.7
Liberal Democrats	John Stephen White	131	9.9%	−0.7
Turnout		1,328	73.6%	
Conservative hold		Swing	+3.3	

Chesfield ward
Party	Candidate	Votes	%	±%
Conservative	Cathryn Henry*	1,682	47.3%	+13.1
Labour	Simon Peter Watson	647	18.2%	+0.3
Liberal Democrats	Terry Tyler	564	15.9%	−28.0
UKIP	Colin Rafferty	497	14.0%	+14.0
Green	Felicity Power	149	4.2%	+0.4
Turnout		3,557	68.0%	
Conservative hold		Swing	+6.4	

Ermine ward
Party	Candidate	Votes	%	±%
Conservative	Gerald Edward Morris*	1,146	73.7%	0.0
Green	Mark Gamon	376	24.2%	+11.8
Turnout		1,554	77.6%	
Conservative hold		Swing	-5.9	

Hitchin Bearton ward
Party	Candidate	Votes	%	±%
Labour	Judi Billing*	1,960	42.8%	+3.2
Conservative	Peter Saville	1,365	29.8%	+6.6
Liberal Democrats	Stuart Alder	484	10.6%	−1.1
Green	Martin Burke	465	10.2%	−3.3
UKIP	Allan Paul Newey	283	6.2%	−5.6
Turnout		4,577	70.7%	
Labour hold		Swing	-1.7	

Hitchin Highbury ward
Party	Candidate	Votes	%	±%
Conservative	Nicola Harris	1,791	39.1%	+3.8
Liberal Democrats	Paul Clark*	1,409	30.8%	+2.5
Labour	Araminta Birdsey	687	15.0%	+1.3
UKIP	Jeremy Groves	350	7.6%	−7.1
Green	Mark Whitby	326	7.1%	−0.3
Turnout		4,582	74.0%	
Conservative gain from Liberal Democrats		Swing	+0.7	

Hitchin Walsworth ward
Party	Candidate	Votes	%	±%
Conservative	Bernard Lovewell*	1,710	39.9%	+6.2
Labour	Elizabeth Louise Dennis	1,332	31.1%	+1.4
Green	Richard Alexander Cano	533	12.4%	−2.4
UKIP	Peter Croft	388	9.1%	−5.9
Liberal Democrats	Andrew Ircha	310	7.2%	+0.7
Turnout		4,285	69.9%	
Conservative hold		Swing	+2.4	

Hitchwood, Offa and Hoo ward
Party	Candidate	Votes	%	±%
Conservative	David Barnard*	2,486	58.0%	−4.0
Labour	Nicola Eleanor Yates	550	12.8%	+3.0
UKIP	Gary Jones	543	12.7%	−4.5
Green	Rick Cadger	353	8.2%	+2.0
Liberal Democrats	Peter Donald Johnson	343	8.0%	3.2
Turnout		4,287	76.0%	
Conservative hold		Swing	-3.5	

Letchworth Grange ward
Party	Candidate	Votes	%	±%
Conservative	Paul Anthony James Marment	1,547	40.4%	+10.5
Labour	David Kearns*	1,270	33.2%	+0.5
UKIP	Andrew Hamilton Scuoler	474	12.4%	−11.5
Green	Elizabeth Susan Hancock	298	7.8%	+0.4
Liberal Democrats	Martin Geoffrey Penny	224	5.9%	+0.5
Turnout		3,827	66.7%	
Conservative gain from Labour		Swing	+5.0	

Letchworth South East ward
Party	Candidate	Votes	%	±%
Conservative	Julian Michael Cunningham*	1,717	46%	+6.9
Labour	Martin Stears-Handscomb	1,193	31.9%	+7.4
UKIP	Sidney Arthur Start	535	14.3%	−8.7
Green	Sam Evison	270	7.2%	+0.9
Turnout		3,734	66.2%	
Conservative hold		Swing	-0.2	

Letchworth South West ward
Party	Candidate	Votes	%	±%
Conservative	Lynda Ann Needham*	2,128	48.6%	+2.6
Labour	Jean Andrews	774	17.7%	+2.1
Green	Mario May	557	12.7%	+1.1
Liberal Democrats	Rebecca Carole Greener	458	10.5%	−0.4
UKIP	John Finbarr Barry	431	9.8%	−5.3
Turnout		4,376	70.8%	
Conservative hold		Swing	+0.2	

Royston Heath ward
Party	Candidate	Votes	%	±%
Conservative	Peter Colin Weston Burt*	1,560	50.8%	+2.9
Labour	Ken Garland	499	16.2%	+2.0
Liberal Democrats	David Robert May	411	13.4%	+4.9
UKIP	Sean Ulick Howlett	370	12.0%	−7.1
Green	Katherine Marie Shann	216	7.0%	−2.6
Turnout		3,071	70.6%	
Conservative hold		Swing	+0.5	

Royston Meridian ward
Party	Candidate	Votes	%	±%
Conservative	Tony Hunter*	1,924	62.9%	+18.0
Labour	Robin Edward Todd	442	14.4%	+2.7
Liberal Democrats	Joe Jordan	381	12.5%	+5.9
Green	Karen Julie Harmel	285	9.3%	+1.2
Turnout		3,060	73.6%	
Conservative hold		Swing	+7.6	

Royston Palace ward
Party	Candidate	Votes	%	±%
Conservative	Jean Margaret Green*	1,155	43.1%	+8.8
Labour	Amy Jane Bourke	634	23.6%	−2.5
UKIP	Gemma Margaret Rosina Hughes	461	17.2%	−8.4
Liberal Democrats	Gerald Charles Denis Jackson	236	8.8%	+1.5
Green	Angela Clark	177	6.6%	+0.3
Turnout		2,682	64.7%	
Conservative hold		Swing	+5.7	

Weston and Sandon ward
Party	Candidate	Votes	%	±%
Liberal Democrats	Steve Jarvis*	751	57.5%	−1.0
Conservative	Leighton James Hughes	427	32.7%	−0.7
Green	Annmarie Brinsley	124	9.5%	+6.0
Turnout		1,307	78.4%	
Liberal Democrats hold		Swing	-0.1	
