= 1991 North Hertfordshire District Council election =

Council election in England

← 1990	2 May 1991	1992 →

16 of 50 seats on North Hertfordshire District Council 26 seats needed for a majority
	First party	Second party	Third party
	Con	Lab	RA
Leader	Bob Flatman
Party	Conservative	Labour	Ratepayers
Seats before	29	16	3
Seats after	26	18	3
Seat change	▼3	▲2	Steady
	Fourth party	Fifth party
	LD	Ind
Party	Liberal Democrats	Independent
Seats before	2	0
Seats after	2	1
Seat change	Steady	▲1
Leader before election
Bob Flatman
Conservative
Leader after election
Bob Flatman
Conservative

The 1991 North Hertfordshire District Council election was held on 2 May 1991, at the same time as other local elections across England and Wales. There were 17 out of 50 seats on North Hertfordshire District Council up for election, being the usual third of the council.

The Conservatives made a net loss of three seats, and only narrowly retained their majority on the council.

== Overall results ==
The overall results were as follows:

1991 North Hertfordshire District Council election
Party	This election			Full council			This election		
Party	Seats	Net	Seats %	Other	Total	Total %	Votes	Votes %	+/−
Conservative	7	▼3	41.2	19	26	52.0	11,692	35.2	-2.5
Labour	6	▲2	35.3	12	18	36.0	11,100	33.5	-10.3
Liberal Democrats	2	Steady	11.8	0	2	4.0	7,431	22.4	+13.8
Ratepayers	1	Steady	5.9	2	3	6.0	2,320	7.0	+3.2
Green	0	Steady	0.0	0	0	0.0	211	0.6	-1.5
Independent	1	▲1	5.9	0	1	2.0	416	1.3	+0.7

== Ward results ==
The results for each ward were as follows. An asterisk (*) indicates a sitting councillor standing for re-election.

Arbury ward
Party	Candidate	Votes	%	±%
Conservative	Andrew Dempster Young	566	50.9	+6.6
Liberal Democrats	Margaret Eluned Waide	416	37.4	−8.7
Labour	Ann Strickland-Clark	130	11.7	+2.1
Turnout			62.7	
Registered electors		1,779		
Conservative gain from Liberal Democrats		Swing	+7.7	

Baldock ward
Party	Candidate	Votes	%	±%
Conservative	Michael Robert McKenzie Muir	1,509	46.7	−1.1
Labour	Rodney Jack Leete	1,124	34.8	−17.4
Liberal Democrats	Sally Margaret Jarvis (Sal Jarvis)	597	18.5	+18.5
Turnout			45.5	
Registered electors		7,093		
Conservative hold		Swing	+8.2	

Hitchin Bearton ward
Party	Candidate	Votes	%	±%
Labour	David John Whitlock	1,064	51.3	−12.6
Conservative	Stephen John Kenneth Archer	691	33.3	+8.0
Liberal Democrats	Lucy Jane Harbron	321	15.5	+4.6
Turnout			46.2	
Registered electors		4,506		
Labour hold		Swing	-10.3	

Hitchin Highbury ward
Party	Candidate	Votes	%	±%
Conservative	Robin Edward Anthony Dartington	977	39.8	+2.5
Ratepayers	Evelyn Mary Burton (Mary Burton)	693	28.2	+28.2
Labour	David John Tizzard	466	19.0	−6.9
Liberal Democrats	Paul Clark	318	13.0	+13.0
Turnout			48.5	
Registered electors		5,061		
Conservative hold		Swing	-12.9	

Hitchin Oughton ward
Party	Candidate	Votes	%	±%
Labour	Audrey Emmie Carss*	1,122	65.7	−2.6
Conservative	Penelope Mary Lambourne	370	21.7	+3.3
Liberal Democrats	Victoria Ellen Walker	215	12.6	−0.7
Turnout			42.5	
Registered electors		4,017		
Labour hold		Swing	-3.0	

Hitchin Walsworth ward
Party	Candidate	Votes	%	±%
Ratepayers	Kenneth William Logan* (Ken Logan)	1,627	57.4	+9.9
Labour	David Edward Billing	914	32.2	−10.8
Liberal Democrats	Roger Paul Newby	294	10.4	+0.9
Turnout			47.2	
Registered electors		6,022		
Ratepayers hold		Swing	+10.4	

Hitchwood ward
Party	Candidate	Votes	%	±%
Conservative	Rodney James Bird	433	62.7	−5.2
Liberal Democrats	Penelope Jean Cunningham	135	19.5	+3.5
Labour	Colin Southward	123	17.8	+1.7
Turnout			51.1	
Registered electors		1,357		
Conservative hold		Swing	-4.4	

Hoo ward
Party	Candidate	Votes	%	±%
Conservative	David John Barnard	410	49.0	+0.1
Labour	Roger Aubrey Wood	313	37.4	+10.5
Liberal Democrats	Douglas Thomas Llewelyn	113	13.5	−10.6
Turnout			56.9	
Registered electors		1,468		
Conservative hold		Swing	-5.2	

Letchworth East ward
Party	Candidate	Votes	%	±%
Labour	William Charles Bifield* (Charles Bifield)	1,108	50.1	−7.6
Conservative	Gloria June Storer	638	28.8	+4.9
Liberal Democrats	Martin Gammell	360	16.3	+6.3
Green	Eric Morris Blakeley	106	4.8	−3.6
Turnout			45.7	
Registered electors		4,855		
Labour hold		Swing	-6.3	

Letchworth Grange ward
Party	Candidate	Votes	%	±%
Labour	Thomas Reade	1,404	54.3	−3.4
Conservative	Carole Anne McNelliey	730	28.2	+4.3
Liberal Democrats	Cathleen Jean Worcester	451	17.4	+7.5
Turnout			49.9	
Registered electors		5,190		
Labour gain from Liberal Democrats		Swing	-3.9	

Letchworth South East ward
Party	Candidate	Votes	%	±%
Labour	Nigel Edward Agar	1,136	37.4	−10.4
Conservative	Raymond Lawrence Shakespeare-Smith	1,123	37.0	+4.0
Liberal Democrats	Alison Elaine Kingman	672	22.1	+22.1
Green	Sylvia Fraser-Andrews	105	3.5	−5.4
Turnout			50.1	
Registered electors		6,066		
Labour hold		Swing	-7.2	

The Letchworth South East seat was previously held by Tony Quinn, who had been elected in 1987 as an SDP councillor. Following the demise of the continuing SDP in 1990, he had joined Labour for the last year of his term.

Letchworth South West ward
Party	Candidate	Votes	%	±%
Liberal Democrats	Ian Simpson	1,257	46.6	+17.8
Conservative	David Alfred Jones*	1,061	39.4	−8.9
Labour	Linda Grimes	377	14.0	−8.9
Turnout			59.7	
Registered electors		4,521		
Liberal Democrats gain from Conservative		Swing	+13.4	

Letchworth Wilbury ward
Party	Candidate	Votes	%	±%
Labour	David Evans	908	43.5	−15.9
Conservative	Keith Fletcher Emsall*	847	40.6	+10.5
Liberal Democrats	Sara Louise Tustin	333	15.9	+5.5
Turnout			53.5	
Registered electors		3,911		
Labour gain from Conservative		Swing	-13.2	

Newsells ward
Party	Candidate	Votes	%	±%
Conservative	Robert Ellis Wilkerson* (Bob Wilkerson)	448	62.3	+0.2
Liberal Democrats	Richard Charles Martin	147	20.4	−12.1
Labour	Catherine Judith Hurst	124	17.2	+12.0
Turnout			58.5	
Registered electors		1,231		
Conservative hold		Swing	+6.2	

Offa ward
Party	Candidate	Votes	%	±%
Conservative	Lynne Kathleen Faulkner*	474	47.7	+4.5
Liberal Democrats	Stephen Kenneth Harbron	404	40.7	−1.7
Labour	John Saunders	115	11.6	−2.8
Turnout			63.4	
Registered electors		1,567		
Conservative hold		Swing	+3.1	

Royston West ward
Party	Candidate	Votes	%	±%
Liberal Democrats	Stuart John Cook	1,366	42.5	+11.3
Conservative	Jeffrey John Perry	1,199	37.3	−0.4
Labour	Leslie Baker	648	20.2	−10.9
Turnout			52.3	
Registered electors		6,167		
Liberal Democrats gain from Conservative		Swing	+5.9	

Sandon ward
Party	Candidate	Votes	%	±%
Independent	Edward William Faure Walker (Teddy Faure Walker)	416	60.5	+60.5
Conservative	Harold Albert Greenfield*	216	31.4	−27.5
Liberal Democrats	Julie Dawn Martin	32	4.7	−31.0
Labour	Caroline Rebecca Karen Doyle	24	3.5	−2.0
Turnout			61.9	
Registered electors		1,115		
Independent gain from Conservative		Swing	+44.0	
