= 1992 North Hertfordshire District Council election =

Council election in England

← 1991	7 May 1992	1994 →

17 of 50 seats on North Hertfordshire District Council 26 seats needed for a majority
	First party	Second party	Third party
	Con	Lab	LD
Leader	Bob Flatman
Party	Conservative	Labour	Liberal Democrats
Seats before	26	18	2
Seats after	26	17	3
Seat change	Steady	▼1	▲1
	Fourth party	Fifth party
	RA	Ind
Party	Ratepayers	Independent
Seats before	3	1
Seats after	3	1
Seat change	Steady	Steady
Leader before election
Bob Flatman
Conservative
Leader after election
Geoff Woods
Conservative

The 1992 North Hertfordshire District Council election was held on 7 May 1992, at the same time as other local elections across England and Scotland. There were 17 out of 50 seats on North Hertfordshire District Council up for election, being the usual third of the council.

The Conservatives retained their narrow majority on the council; they lost one seat to the Liberal Democrats but gained one seat from Labour. Following the election, at the annual council meeting on 19 May 1992, the Conservative leader of the council, Bob Flatman, was appointed to the more ceremonial role of vice-chairman. He had been leader since the council's creation in 1974. Geoff Woods was appointed as the new leader of the council and Conservative group leader in his place.

== Overall results ==
The overall results were as follows:

1992 North Hertfordshire District Council election
Party	This election			Full council			This election		
Party	Seats	Net	Seats %	Other	Total	Total %	Votes	Votes %	+/−
Conservative	11	Steady	64.7	15	26	52.0	14,033	43.1	+7.9
Labour	4	▼1	35.3	13	17	34.0	8,993	27.6	-5.8
Liberal Democrats	1	▲1	5.9	2	3	6.0	6,849	21.1	-1.3
Ratepayers	1	Steady	5.9	2	3	6.0	2,585	7.9	+1.0
Green	0	Steady	0.0	0	0	0.0	65	0.2	-0.4

== Ward results ==
The results for each ward were as follows. An asterisk(*) indicates a sitting councillor standing for re-election. A double dagger (‡) indicates a sitting councillor contesting a different ward.

Ashbrook ward
Party	Candidate	Votes	%	±%
Conservative	Michael Tatham*	789	70.4	+5.9
Labour	John Saunders	215	19.2	−5.3
Liberal Democrats	Elizabeth Upchurch	116	10.4	−0.6
Turnout			54.0	
Registered electors		2,136		
Conservative hold		Swing	+5.6	

Baldock ward
Party	Candidate	Votes	%	±%
Conservative	Bernard Crow*	1,536	51.0	+4.3
Liberal Democrats	Harry Penfold	846	28.1	+9.6
Labour	Rodney Leete	629	20.9	−13.9
Turnout			42.4	
Registered electors		7,133		
Conservative hold		Swing	-2.7	

Cadwell ward
Party	Candidate	Votes	%	±%
Conservative	Richard Lee*	620	67.8	+12.8
Labour	David Lawson	294	32.2	−1.3
Turnout			50.3	
Registered electors		1,832		
Conservative hold		Swing	+7.1	

Hitchin Bearton ward
Party	Candidate	Votes	%	±%
Labour	Judi Billing*	845	42.0	−9.3
Conservative	Michael East	704	35.0	+1.7
Ratepayers	Chris Parker ‡	315	15.7	+15.7
Liberal Democrats	Richard Canning	148	7.4	−8.1
Turnout			44.6	
Registered electors		4,520		
Labour hold		Swing	-5.5	

Hitchin Highbury ward
Party	Candidate	Votes	%	±%
Conservative	Paul Dee	1,067	46.1	+6.3
Ratepayers	Evelyn Mary Burton (Mary Burton)	657	28.4	+0.1
Liberal Democrats	Paul Clark	304	13.1	+0.2
Labour	Paul Gater	288	12.4	−6.6
Turnout			45.7	
Registered electors		5,073		
Conservative hold		Swing	+3.1	

Hitchin Oughton ward
Party	Candidate	Votes	%	±%
Labour	Joan Kirby*	796	58.4	−7.3
Conservative	Julia McLean	431	31.6	+10.0
Liberal Democrats	Geoffrey Palmer	135	9.9	−2.7
Turnout			34.6	
Registered electors		3,972		
Labour hold		Swing	-8.7	

Hitchin Priory ward
Party	Candidate	Votes	%	±%
Conservative	Richard Thake*	822	63.4	+9.6
Liberal Democrats	Elizabeth Seabrook	321	24.8	−5.0
Labour	David Tizzard	153	11.8	−4.5
Turnout			46.3	
Registered electors		2,802		
Conservative hold		Swing	+7.3	

Hitchin Walsworth ward
Party	Candidate	Votes	%	±%
Ratepayers	Dennis Ward	1,613	60.8	+3.4
Labour	Philip Kirk	821	30.9	−1.3
Liberal Democrats	Penelope Cunningham	220	8.3	−2.1
Turnout			43.5	
Registered electors		6,091		
Ratepayers hold		Swing	+2.4	

Knebworth ward
Party	Candidate	Votes	%	±%
Conservative	Margaret Hilton*	861	62.6	+6.3
Liberal Democrats	Michael Stiff	335	24.3	+13.1
Labour	Jack Ashwell	180	13.1	−10.0
Turnout			40.7	
Registered electors		3,402		
Conservative hold		Swing	-3.4	

Letchworth East ward
Party	Candidate	Votes	%	±%
Labour	Lorna Kercher*	878	45.0	−5.1
Conservative	Ravinder Athwal	603	30.9	+2.1
Liberal Democrats	Martin Gammell	405	20.8	+4.5
Green	Eric Blakeley	65	3.3	−1.5
Turnout			39.8	
Registered electors		4,926		
Labour hold		Swing	-3.6	

Letchworth Grange ward
Party	Candidate	Votes	%	±%
Labour	David Kearns*	1,078	52.3	−2.0
Conservative	Carole McNelliey	613	29.8	+1.5
Liberal Democrats	Cathleen Worcester	369	17.9	+0.5
Turnout			40.0	
Registered electors		5,169		
Labour hold		Swing	-1.8	

Letchworth South East ward
Party	Candidate	Votes	%	±%
Conservative	Pauline Wood*	1,261	44.6	+7.6
Labour	Teresa Trangmar (Tre Trangmar)	969	34.3	−3.1
Liberal Democrats	Pauline Poole	596	21.1	−1.0
Turnout			46.4	
Registered electors		6,097		
Conservative hold		Swing	+5.4	

The poll in Letchworth South East ward was delayed until 11 June following the death of one of the original candidates, former SDP and Labour councillor Tony Quinn, who was to have stood for Labour.

Letchworth South West ward
Party	Candidate	Votes	%	±%
Conservative	Geoffrey Woods* (Geoff Woods)	1,206	48.3	+8.9
Liberal Democrats	Alison Kingman	1,030	41.2	−5.4
Labour	Linda Grimes	263	10.5	−3.5
Turnout			55.0	
Registered electors		4,551		
Conservative hold		Swing	+7.2	

Letchworth Wilbury ward
Party	Candidate	Votes	%	±%
Conservative	Raymond Shakespeare-Smith (Ray Shakespeare-Smith)	773	41.7	+1.1
Labour	Peter Mardell*	660	35.6	−7.9
Liberal Democrats	Paul Booton	422	22.7	+6.8
Turnout			47.4	
Registered electors		3,920		
Conservative gain from Labour		Swing	+4.5	

Royston East ward
Party	Candidate	Votes	%	±%
Conservative	Francis John Smith* (John Smith)	1,131	61.1	+12.8
Liberal Democrats	Margaret Pitts	386	20.8	+7.7
Labour	Jessie Etheridge	335	18.1	−12.4
Turnout			43.5	
Registered electors		4,254		
Conservative hold		Swing	+2.6	

Royston West ward
Party	Candidate	Votes	%	±%
Conservative	Mark Hughes*	1,288	48.1	+10.7
Liberal Democrats	Pat Kennington	833	31.1	−11.4
Labour	Les Baker	559	20.9	+0.7
Turnout			43.5	
Registered electors		6,189		
Conservative hold		Swing	+11.1	

Weston ward
Party	Candidate	Votes	%	±%
Liberal Democrats	Stephen Jarvis (Steve Jarvis)	383	51.7	+24.2
Conservative	Robert Evans*	328	44.3	−12.3
Labour	Teresa Trangmar (Tre Trangmar)	30	4.0	−11.8
Turnout			58.8	
Registered electors		1,259		
Liberal Democrats gain from Conservative		Swing	+18.3	

== Changes 1992–1994 ==
On 12 June 1992 Labour councillor Don Kitchiner, who represented Letchworth Grange, announced his defection to the Conservatives.

Some time between the 1992 and 1994 elections it would appear that there was a by-election in Hitchin Walsworth ward which saw Ratepayer councillor Jack Swain being replaced by Labour councillor Philip Kirk, whilst the seat in that ward held by Dennis Ward in 1992 had also gone to Labour by the time of the 1994 election, although whether by a defection or a by-election has yet to be established.
