= 1995 North Hertfordshire District Council election =

Council election in England

← 1994	4 May 1995	1996 →

17 of 50 seats on North Hertfordshire District Council 26 seats needed for a majority
	First party	Second party	Third party
	Con	Lab	LD
Leader	Geoff Woods	David Kearns	Ian Simpson
Party	Conservative	Labour	Liberal Democrats
Seats before	25	18	5
Seats after	22	21	6
Seat change	▼3	▲3	▲1
	Fourth party	Fifth party
	RA	Ind
Party	Ratepayers	Independent
Seats before	1	1
Seats after	0	1
Seat change	▼1	Steady
Leader before election
Geoff Woods
Conservative
No overall control
Policy chairman after election
David Kearns
Labour
No overall control

The 1995 North Hertfordshire District Council election was held on 4 May 1995, at the same time as other local elections across England and Wales. There were 17 out of 50 seats on North Hertfordshire District Council up for election, being the usual third of the council.

The council remained under no overall control. Prior to the election the council had been run by a Conservative minority administration, with the Conservative leader, Geoff Woods, being leader of the council. At the election, the Conservatives made a net loss of three seats whilst Labour gained three seats and was able to form a minority administration with the support of the Liberal Democrats, although the two parties did not formally consider their arrangement to be a coalition. At the subsequent annual council meeting on 16 May 1995 the Labour leader, David Kearns, took the council's most senior political role as chairman of the policy and resources committee, although he was not given the title of leader of the council that all previous policy chairmen had held. Immediately after the election the Conservatives changed their group leader from Geoff Woods to F. John Smith.

== Overall results ==
The overall results were as follows:

1995 North Hertfordshire District Council election
Party	This election			Full council			This election		
Party	Seats	Net	Seats %	Other	Total	Total %	Votes	Votes %	+/−
Labour	9	▲3	52.9	12	21	42.0	13,640	45.6	+7.6
Conservative	4	▼3	23.5	18	22	44.0	8,080	27.0	-4.7
Liberal Democrats	3	▲1	17.6	3	6	12.0	6,544	21.9	-3.9
Ratepayers	0	▼1	0.0	0	0	0.0	1,160	3.9	+1.2
Independent	0	Steady	0.0	1	1	2.0	482	1.6	+0.5
Green	0	Steady	0.0	0	0	0.0	34	0.1	-0.6

== Ward results ==
The results for each ward were as follows. An asterisk(*) indicates a sitting councillor standing for re-election.

Arbury ward
Party	Candidate	Votes	%	±%
Conservative	Andrew Young*	671	57.3	+6.4
Liberal Democrats	Roger Pritchard	323	27.6	−9.8
Labour	Roger McFall	177	15.1	+3.4
Turnout			62.1	
Registered electors		1,887		
Conservative hold		Swing	+8.1	

Baldock ward
Party	Candidate	Votes	%	±%
Labour	Brian Derbyshire	1,535	53.2	+18.2
Conservative	Michael Muir*	919	31.8	−9.8
Liberal Democrats	Vernon Gaskell	433	15.0	−8.4
Turnout			40.5	
Registered electors		7,132		
Labour gain from Conservative		Swing	+14.0	

Hitchin Bearton ward
Party	Candidate	Votes	%	±%
Labour	Donald Hitchcock	1,181	71.8	+9.8
Conservative	Michael East	271	16.5	−2.3
Liberal Democrats	Jonathan Newham	192	11.7	+2.8
Turnout			36.1	
Registered electors		4,566		
Labour hold		Swing	+6.1	

Hitchin Highbury ward
Party	Candidate	Votes	%	±%
Liberal Democrats	Paul Clark	1,041	44.2	+5.0
Conservative	Robin Dartington*	744	31.6	−9.4
Labour	April Shelbourn	570	24.2	+4.4
Turnout			46.6	
Registered electors		5,066		
Liberal Democrats gain from Conservative		Swing	+7.2	

Hitchin Oughton ward
Party	Candidate	Votes	%	±%
Labour	Audrey Carss*	1,157	76.5	+11.7
Conservative	Nigel Brook	184	12.2	−4.6
Liberal Democrats	Victoria Walker (Vicki Walker)	171	11.3	−7.0
Turnout			37.5	
Registered electors		4,038		
Labour hold		Swing	+8.2	

Hitchin Walsworth ward
Party	Candidate	Votes	%	±%
Labour	Peter Terry	1,275	45.9	−4.6
Ratepayers	Ken Logan*	1,160	41.8	+11.5
Conservative	Bernard Lovewell	212	7.6	−2.7
Liberal Democrats	Penelope Cunningham	128	4.6	−4.2
Turnout			46.2	
Registered electors		6,018		
Labour gain from Ratepayers		Swing	-8.1	

Hitchwood ward
Party	Candidate	Votes	%	±%
Conservative	Rodney Bird*	318	55.4	−7.3
Labour	Colin Southward	175	30.5	+12.7
Liberal Democrats	Elizabeth Upchurch	81	14.1	−5.4
Turnout			41.2	
Registered electors		1,398		
Conservative hold		Swing	-10.0	

Hoo ward
Party	Candidate	Votes	%	±%
Labour	Roger Wood	403	46.4	+8.9
Conservative	David Barnard*	400	46.0	−3.0
Liberal Democrats	Richard Martin	66	7.6	−5.9
Turnout			59.5	
Registered electors		1,464		
Labour gain from Conservative		Swing	+6.0	

Letchworth East ward
Party	Candidate	Votes	%	±%
Labour	Anthony Hartley (Tony Hartley)	1,343	65.5	+12.0
Conservative	Simon Bloxham	378	18.4	−6.7
Liberal Democrats	David Ellis	296	14.4	−3.8
Green	Eric Blakeley	34	1.7	−1.5
Turnout			41.9	
Registered electors		4,896		
Labour hold		Swing	+9.4	

The Letchworth East seat had previously been held by Labour councillor Charles Bifield, but had been vacant since his death on 16 February 1995.

Letchworth Grange ward
Party	Candidate	Votes	%	±%
Labour	David Morris	1,668	71.7	+12.6
Conservative	Evelyn Mitchell	390	16.8	−3.9
Liberal Democrats	Robin Hall	269	11.6	−8.7
Turnout			45.5	
Registered electors		5,122		
Labour hold		Swing	+8.3	

Letchworth South East ward
Party	Candidate	Votes	%	±%
Labour	Nigel Agar*	1,439	51.0	+10.2
Liberal Democrats	Martin Gammell	738	26.2	−8.2
Conservative	Carole McNelliey	642	22.8	−2.0
Turnout			46.0	
Registered electors		6,149		
Labour hold		Swing	+9.2	

Letchworth South West ward
Party	Candidate	Votes	%	±%
Liberal Democrats	Ian Simpson*	1,141	44.6	+0.5
Conservative	Lynda Needham	1,007	39.3	−0.4
Labour	Edna Patricia Watson-Blake (Pat Watson-Blake)	413	16.1	−0.1
Turnout			56.0	
Registered electors		4,579		
Liberal Democrats hold		Swing	+0.5	

Letchworth Wilbury ward
Party	Candidate	Votes	%	±%
Labour	David Evans*	975	56.3	+3.6
Conservative	Jessica Thomson	424	24.5	−0.6
Liberal Democrats	Paul Booton	333	19.2	−3.1
Turnout			40.5	
Registered electors		4,275		
Labour hold		Swing	+2.1	

Newsells ward
Party	Candidate	Votes	%	±%
Conservative	Robert Wilkerson* (Bob Wilkerson)	419	54.6	−7.7
Liberal Democrats	Frank Christopher East (Chris East)	187	24.4	+3.9
Labour	Frederick Peacock (Fred Peacock)	161	21.0	+3.7
Turnout			59.9	
Registered electors		1,290		
Conservative hold		Swing	-5.8	

Offa ward
Party	Candidate	Votes	%	±%
Conservative	Claire Strong	310	37.7	−10.0
Liberal Democrats	Sally Jarvis (Sal Jarvis)	275	33.5	−7.2
Labour	Jean Wood	237	28.8	+17.3
Turnout			53.4	
Registered electors		1,542		
Conservative hold		Swing	-1.4	

Royston West ward
Party	Candidate	Votes	%	±%
Liberal Democrats	Stuart Cook*	870	34.7	−3.0
Labour	Kenneth Garland (Ken Garland)	844	33.7	+5.8
Conservative	Peter Lill	791	31.6	−2.8
Turnout			40.0	
Registered electors		6,275		
Liberal Democrats hold		Swing	-4.4	

Sandon ward
Party	Candidate	Votes	%	±%
Independent	Edward Faure Walker* (Teddy Faure Walker)	482	84.7	+24.2
Labour	Neil Haslam	87	15.3	+11.8
Turnout			49.7	
Registered electors		1,151		
Independent hold		Swing	+6.2	
