= 1994 North Hertfordshire District Council election =

Council election in England

← 1992	5 May 1994	1995 →

16 of 50 seats on North Hertfordshire District Council 26 seats needed for a majority
	First party	Second party	Third party
	Con	Lab	LD
Leader	Geoff Woods	David Kearns	Ian Simpson
Party	Conservative	Labour	Liberal Democrats
Seats before	27	18	3
Seats after	25	18	5
Seat change	▼2	Steady	▲2
	Fourth party	Fifth party
	RA	Ind
Party	Ratepayers	Independent
Seats before	1	1
Seats after	1	1
Seat change	Steady	Steady
Leader before election
Geoff Woods
Conservative
Leader after election
Geoff Woods
Conservative
No overall control

The 1994 North Hertfordshire District Council election was held on 5 May 1994, at the same time as other local elections across England and Scotland. There were 16 out of 50 seats on North Hertfordshire District Council up for election, being the usual third of the council.

Labour won most votes, but saw no net increase in its number of seats. The Conservatives saw a net loss of two seats, leaving them with exactly half the council's seats, putting the council under no overall control. The Conservatives continued to form the council's administration after the election by virtue of the chairman's casting vote.

== Overall results ==
The overall results were as follows:

1994 North Hertfordshire District Council election
Party	This election			Full council			This election		
Party	Seats	Net	Seats %	Other	Total	Total %	Votes	Votes %	+/−
Labour	7	Steady	43.8	11	18	36.0	12,950	38.0	+10.3
Conservative	7	▼2	43.8	18	25	50.0	10,825	31.7	-11.4
Liberal Democrats	2	▲2	12.5	3	5	10.0	8,797	25.8	+4.7
Ratepayers	0	Steady	0.0	1	1	2.0	924	2.7	-5.2
Independent	0	Steady	0.0	1	1	2.0	373	1.1	+1.1
Green	0	Steady	0.0	0	0	0.0	241	0.7	+0.5

== Ward results ==
The results for each ward were as follows. An asterisk(*) indicates a sitting councillor standing for re-election.

Baldock ward
Party	Candidate	Votes	%	±%
Conservative	Victor Bagnelle	1,310	41.7	−9.3
Labour	Anthony Hartley; Tony Hartley)	1,098	34.9	+14.0
Liberal Democrats	Sally Jarvis (Sal Jarvis)	735	23.4	−4.7
Turnout			44.3	
Registered electors		7,112		
Conservative gain from Labour		Swing	-11.7	

Codicote ward
Party	Candidate	Votes	%	±%
Conservative	Edward Ian Smith* (Ian Smith)	612	45.7	−11.6
Labour	Tony McWalter	483	36.1	−6.6
Liberal Democrats	Richard Stanley	186	13.9	+13.9
Independent	Michael Nelson (Note: "Independent Labour")	58	4.3	+4.3
Turnout			53.8	
Registered electors		2,499		
Conservative hold		Swing	-2.5	

Hitchin Bearton ward
Party	Candidate	Votes	%	±%
Labour	Jennifer Marr* (Jenny Marr)	1,233	62.0	+20.0
Conservative	Michael East	374	18.8	−16.2
Liberal Democrats	Richard Martin	177	8.9	+1.5
Ratepayers	Christopher Parker	108	5.4	−10.2
Green	Nigel Howitt	96	4.8	+4.8
Turnout			44.1	
Registered electors		4,504		
Labour hold		Swing	+18.1	

Hitchin Highbury ward
Party	Candidate	Votes	%	±%
Conservative	Thomas Chapman	1,016	41.0	−5.1
Liberal Democrats	Paul Clark	973	39.2	+26.1
Labour	David Tizzard	491	19.8	+7.4
Turnout			48.7	
Registered electors		5,099		
Conservative hold		Swing	-15.6	

Hitchin Oughton ward
Party	Candidate	Votes	%	±%
Labour	David Harbourne	980	64.9	+6.4
Liberal Democrats	Vicki Walker	277	18.3	+8.4
Conservative	Nigel Brook	254	16.8	−14.8
Turnout			37.4	
Registered electors		4,038		
Labour hold		Swing	-1.0	

Hitchin Priory ward
Party	Candidate	Votes	%	±%
Conservative	Derrick Ashley	566	41.0	−22.4
Independent	David Chamberlain	315	22.8	+22.8
Liberal Democrats	Richard Canning	277	20.1	−4.7
Labour	Martin Stears	221	16.0	+4.2
Turnout			47.9	
Registered electors		2,888		
Conservative hold		Swing	-22.6	

Hitchin Walsworth ward
Party	Candidate	Votes	%	±%
Labour	Philip Kirk*	1,360	50.6	+19.6
Ratepayers	Evelyn Mary Burton (Mary Burton)	816	30.3	−30.4
Conservative	Bernard Lovewell	277	10.3	+10.3
Liberal Democrats	Jonathan Heath	237	8.8	+0.5
Turnout			44.5	
Registered electors		6,050		
Labour hold		Swing	+25.0	

Kimpton ward
Party	Candidate	Votes	%	±%
Conservative	Richard Burn	382	48.2	−11.6
Liberal Democrats	Geoffrey Palmer	290	36.6	+36.6
Labour	Roger Wood	120	15.2	−25.0
Turnout			48.0	
Registered electors		1,663		
Conservative hold		Swing	-24.1	

Knebworth ward
Party	Candidate	Votes	%	±%
Conservative	Gordon Dumelow*	793	51.5	−11.1
Liberal Democrats	Michael Stiff	341	22.1	−2.2
Labour	Gordon Levett	328	21.3	+8.2
Green	Stuart Madgin	79	5.1	+5.1
Turnout			45.9	
Registered electors		3,371		
Conservative hold		Swing	-4.5	

Letchworth East ward
Party	Candidate	Votes	%	±%
Labour	Arthur Jarman*	1,121	53.5	+8.5
Conservative	Anthony Harris	527	25.2	−5.8
Liberal Democrats	Martin Gammell	381	18.2	−2.6
Green	Eric Blakeley	66	3.2	−0.2
Turnout			42.6	
Registered electors		4,929		
Labour hold		Swing	+7.2	

Letchworth Grange ward
Party	Candidate	Votes	%	±%
Labour	Peter Mardell	1,482	59.0	+6.7
Conservative	Evelyn Mitchell	519	20.7	−9.1
Liberal Democrats	Robin Hall	509	20.3	+2.4
Turnout			48.5	
Registered electors		5,173		
Labour gain from Conservative		Swing	+7.9	

Letchworth South East ward
Party	Candidate	Votes	%	±%
Labour	Jack Wilkinson*	1,305	40.9	+6.6
Liberal Democrats	David Ellis	1,096	34.3	+13.3
Conservative	Carole McNelliey	790	24.8	−19.9
Turnout			53.8	
Registered electors		5,937		
Labour hold		Swing	-3.4	

Letchworth South West ward
Party	Candidate	Votes	%	±%
Liberal Democrats	Alison Kingman	1,166	44.0	+2.8
Conservative	Lynda Needham*	1,051	39.7	−8.6
Labour	Edna Patricia Watson-Blake (Pat Watson-Blake)	431	16.3	+5.8
Turnout			58.8	
Registered electors		4,507		
Liberal Democrats gain from Conservative		Swing	+5.7	

Letchworth Wilbury ward
Party	Candidate	Votes	%	±%
Labour	Ian Mantle*	990	52.7	+17.1
Conservative	Simon Bloxham	471	25.1	−16.6
Liberal Democrats	Paul Booton	419	22.3	−0.5
Turnout			45.2	
Registered electors		4,160		
Labour hold		Swing	+16.9	

Royston East ward
Party	Candidate	Votes	%	±%
Conservative	Douglas Drake* (Doug Drake)	900	43.6	−17.4
Liberal Democrats	Margaret Pitts	655	31.7	+10.9
Labour	Robin King	508	24.6	+6.5
Turnout			47.8	
Registered electors		4,315		
Conservative hold		Swing	-14.2	

Royston West ward
Party	Candidate	Votes	%	±%
Liberal Democrats	Patricia Kennington (Pat Kennington)	1,078	37.7	+6.6
Conservative	Jane Dwerryhouse-Spears	983	34.4	−13.7
Labour	Leslie Baker (Les Baker)	799	27.9	+7.1
Turnout			46.2	
Registered electors		6,184		
Liberal Democrats gain from Conservative		Swing	+10.2	
